= 2018 Commonwealth Games Parade of Nations =

During the Parade of Nations at the 2018 Commonwealth Games opening ceremony, held on 4 April 2018, 71 athletes bearing the flags of their respective nations led their national delegations as they paraded into Carrara Stadium in the host city of Gold Coast, Australia.

== Parade order ==
Following tradition, the host of the previous games, Scotland enters first, followed by the rest of the European countries competing. Following this, all countries parade in alphabetical order from their respective regions. After the European countries enter, countries from Africa, the Americas, Asia, the Caribbean, and lastly Oceania march in. The host nation of Australia enters last. Each nation was preceded by a placard bearer carrying a sign with the country's name.

A total of 39 male athletes carried their nation's flag, while 32 females did the same. Athletics was the most represented sport among the flag bearers, with 24 nations being led by track and field athletes.

== Countries and flag bearers ==
Below is a list of parading countries and their announced flag bearer, in the same order as the parade. This is sortable by country name, flag bearer's name, or flag bearer's sport. Names are given in the form officially designated by the CGF.

Order	Nation	Flag bearer	Sport
1	Scotland	Eilidh Doyle	Athletics
2	Cyprus	Georgios Achilleos	Shooting
3	England	Alistair Brownlee	Triathlon
4	Gibraltar	Jonathan Patron	Shooting
5	Guernsey	Matthew Guille	Shooting
6	Isle of Man	Jake Kelly	Cycling
7	Jersey	Dan Halksworth	Cycling
8	Malta	Gary Giordimaina	Wrestling
9	Northern Ireland	Caroline O’Hanlon	Netball
10	Wales	Jazz Carlin	Swimming
11	Botswana	Nijel Amos	Athletics
12	Cameroon	Clotilde Essiane	Boxing
13	Ghana	Abdul Omar	Boxing
14	Kenya	Elijah Manangoi	Athletics
15	Lesotho	Phetetso Monese	Cycling
16	Malawi	Joyce Mvula	Netball
17	Mauritius	Rhikesh Taucoory	Table tennis
18	Mozambique	Jenito Guezane	Athletics
19	Namibia	Ananias Shikongo	Para athletics
20	Nigeria	Blessing Okagbare	Athletics
21	Rwanda	Salome Nyirarukundo	Athletics
22	Seychelles	Dylan Sicobo	Athletics
23	Sierra Leone	Hafsatu Kamara	Athletics
24	South Africa	Caster Semenya	Athletics
25	Swaziland	Thabiso Dlamini	Boxing
26	The Gambia	Ola Buwaro	Athletics
27	Uganda	Peace Proscovia	Netball
28	Tanzania	Masoud Mtalaso	Table tennis
29	Zambia	Kelvin Ndhlovu	Squash
30	Belize	Alicia Thompson	Cycling
31	Bermuda	Tyler Smith	Triathlon
32	Canada	Meaghan Benfeito	Diving
33	Falkland Islands	Graham Didlick	Shooting
34	Guyana	Troy Doris	Athletics
35	Saint Helena	Ben Dillon	Swimming
36	Bahamas	Joanna Evans	Swimming
37	Bangladesh	Abdullah Hel Baki	Shooting
38	Brunei	Amaliah Matali	Lawn bowls
39	India	P. V. Sindhu	Badminton
40	Malaysia	Muhammad Hakimi Ismail	Athletics
41	Pakistan	Usman Amjad Rathore	Weightlifting
42	Singapore	Teo Shun Xie	Shooting
43	Sri Lanka	Chinthana Vidanage	Weightlifting
44	Anguilla	Mauriel Carty	Athletics
45	Antigua and Barbuda	Priscilla Frederick	Athletics
46	Barbados	Meagan Best	Squash
47	British Virgin Islands	Kyron McMaster	Athletics
48	Cayman Islands	Carl Morgan	Athletics
49	Dominica	Mitchel Davis	Athletics
50	Grenada	Kurt Felix	Athletics
51	Jamaica	Alia Atkinson	Swimming
52	Montserrat	Julius Morris	Athletics
53	Saint Lucia	Levern Spencer	Athletics
54	Saint Kitts and Nevis	St Clair Hodge	Beach volleyball
55	Saint Vincent and the Grenadines	Kineke Alexander	Athletics
56	Trinidad and Tobago	Michelle-Lee Ahye	Athletics
57	Turks and Caicos Islands	Latoya Rigby	Shooting
58	Cook Islands	Patricia Taea	Athletics
59	Fiji	Apolonia Vaivai	Weightlifting
60	Kiribati	David Katoatau	Weightlifting
61	Nauru	Itte Detenamo	Weightlifting
62	New Zealand	Sophie Pascoe	Para swimming
63	Niue	Pau Blumsky	Lawn bowls
64	Norfolk Island	Hadyn Evans	Lawn bowls
65	Papua New Guinea	Vero Nime	Para table tennis
66	Samoa	Lauititi Lui	Weightlifting
67	Solomon Islands	Jenly Tegu Wini	Weightlifting
68	Tonga	Magan Maka	Boxing
69	Tuvalu	Manuila Raobu	Weightlifting
70	Vanuatu	Miller Pata	Beach volleyball
71	Australia	Mark Knowles	Hockey
