= Shooting at the 2018 Commonwealth Games – Women's 50 metre rifle prone =

Women's 50 metre rifle prone at the 2018 Commonwealth Games
- Venue: Belmont Shooting Centre, Brisbane
- Dates: 12 April 2018
- Competitors: 20 from 12 nations

Medalists
gold medal	Martina Lindsay Veloso	Singapore
silver medal	Tejaswini Sawant	India
bronze medal	Seonaid McIntosh	Scotland

The Women's 50 metre rifle prone event was held on 12 April 2018 at the Belmont Shooting Centre, Brisbane.

== Results ==
Rank	Name	1	2	1-2	3	1-3	4	1-4	5	1-5	6	Total	Notes
1st place, gold medalist(s)	Martina Lindsay Veloso (SIN)	102.9	102.7	205.6	103.1	308.7	104.3	413.0	103.2	516.2	104.8	621.0	GR
2nd place, silver medalist(s)	Tejaswini Sawant (IND)	102.1	102.4	204.5	103.3	307.8	102.8	410.6	103.7	514.3	104.6	618.9	
3rd place, bronze medalist(s)	Seonaid McIntosh (SCO)	102.1	102.5	204.6	102.0	306.6	105.5	412.1	102.3	514.4	103.7	618.1	
4	Lina Jones (ENG)	103.2	102.6	205.8	102.1	307.9	100.6	408.5	103.7	512.2	103.5	615.7	
5	Xiang Wei Jasmine Ser (SIN)	103.1	103.5	206.6	102.2	308.8	102.1	410.9	101.9	512.8	102.8	615.6	
6	Rachel Glover (IOM)	104.1	102.7	206.8	99.7	306.5	102.6	409.1	104.0	513.1	102.3	615.4	
7	Nur Suryani Mohamed Taibi (MAS)	104.4	102.2	206.6	101.4	308.0	101.3	409.3	102.1	511.4	102.5	613.9	
8	Jennifer McIntosh (SCO)	99.5	103.1	202.6	104.0	306.6	103.6	410.2	99.3	509.5	103.4	612.9	
9	Robyn Ridley (AUS)	101.0	103.5	204.5	103.4	307.9	100.9	408.8	101.9	510.7	101.8	612.5	
10	Janet Hunt (NZL)	102.9	101.9	204.8	102.4	307.2	101.4	408.6	100.9	509.5	98.7	608.2	
11	Sally Johnston (NZL)	99.9	100.0	199.9	102.3	302.2	102.6	404.8	101.4	506.2	101.6	607.8	
12	Katie Gleeson (ENG)	98.8	101.7	200.5	103.5	304.0	102.6	406.6	100.0	506.6	101.2	607.8	
13	Susannah Smith (AUS)	99.0	101.4	200.4	100.5	300.9	101.3	402.2	102.4	504.6	102.1	606.7	
14	Suraiya Akter (BAN)	99.8	100.6	200.4	100.4	300.8	99.5	400.3	103.0	503.3	101.0	604.3	
15	Sarah Campion (JER)	96.5	97.9	194.4	100.3	294.7	102.5	397.2	103.3	500.5	103.0	603.5	
16	Anjum Moudgil (IND)	98.3	98.9	197.2	97.9	295.1	101.8	396.9	101.8	498.7	103.5	602.2	
17	Sarmin Shilpa (BAN)	101.6	100.0	201.6	101.1	302.7	97.9	400.6	97.2	497.8	101.4	599.2	
18	Mercy Chodo (GHA)	97.4	99.8	197.2	100.4	297.6	99.6	397.2	99.1	496.3	101.2	597.5	
19	Gemma Kermode (IOM)	96.0	96.6	192.6	101.0	293.6	99.7	393.3	98.3	491.6	97.4	589.0	
20	Cleopatra Mungoma (UGA)	94.9	92.5	187.4	98.8	286.2	92.4	378.6	97.8	476.4	95.5	571.9	
