= Shooting at the 2018 Commonwealth Games – Women's 10 metre air rifle =

Shooting event

Shooting – Women's 10 metre air rifle at the 2018 Commonwealth Games
- Venue: Belmont Shooting Centre, Brisbane
- Dates: 9 April 2018
- Competitors: 18 from 12 nations

Medalists
| gold medal | Martina Veloso | Singapore |
| silver medal | Mehuli Ghosh | India |
| bronze medal | Apurvi Chandela | India |

The Women's 10 metre air rifle was part of the Shooting at the 2018 Commonwealth Games program. The competition was held on 9 April 2018 at Belmont Shooting Centre in Brisbane. Martina Veloso won the gold medal, which was Singapore's first gold at the 2018 Commonwealth Games.

== Results ==
=== Qualification ===
| Rank | Name | 1 | 2 | 1-2 | 3 | 1-3 | 4 | Points | Notes |
|---|---|---|---|---|---|---|---|---|---|
| 1 | Apurvi Chandela (IND) | 105.7 | 105.2 | 210.9 | 106.1 | 317.0 | 106.2 | 423.2 | Q |
| 2 | Tessa Neo (SIN) | 104.6 | 104.2 | 208.8 | 104.6 | 313.4 | 103.8 | 417.2 | Q |
| 3 | Victoria Rossiter (AUS) | 104.9 | 104.1 | 209.0 | 104.7 | 313.7 | 102.1 | 415.8 | Q |
| 4 | Martina Veloso (SGP) | 103.9 | 103.1 | 207.0 | 103.9 | 310.9 | 103.4 | 414.3 | Q |
| 5 | Mehuli Ghosh (IND) | 104.3 | 103.7 | 208.0 | 102.2 | 310.2 | 103.5 | 413.7 | Q |
| 6 | Ummey Sultana (BAN) | 103.8 | 101.3 | 205.1 | 102.6 | 307.7 | 102.8 | 410.5 | Q |
| 7 | Seonaid McIntosh (SCO) | 102.2 | 103.1 | 205.3 | 103.0 | 308.3 | 102.1 | 410.4 | Q |
| 8 | Sian Corish (WAL) | 102.4 | 103.1 | 205.5 | 102.5 | 308.0 | 101.6 | 409.6 | Q |
| 9 | Jennifer McIntosh (SCO) | 102.3 | 103.2 | 205.5 | 101.5 | 307.0 | 102.4 | 409.4 | |
| 10 | Sayeda Hasan (BAN) | 101.9 | 103.2 | 205.1 | 101.7 | 306.8 | 100.6 | 407.4 | |
| 11 | Nur Suryani Taibi (MAS) | 100.2 | 102.3 | 202.5 | 101.0 | 303.5 | 103.1 | 406.6 | |
| 12 | Minhal Sohail (PAK) | 102.9 | 100.6 | 203.5 | 101.7 | 305.2 | 101.0 | 406.2 | |
| 13 | Marilena Constantinou (CYP) | 102.1 | 100.2 | 202.3 | 101.6 | 303.9 | 102.0 | 405.9 | |
| 14 | Kate Gleeson (ENG) | 102.5 | 102.8 | 205.3 | 101.2 | 306.5 | 99.3 | 405.8 | |
| 15 | Sanduni Perera (SRI) | 101.7 | 101.7 | 203.4 | 99.5 | 302.9 | 101.3 | 404.2 | |
| 16 | Emma Adams (AUS) | 96.5 | 100.5 | 197.0 | 103.8 | 300.8 | 98.3 | 399.1 | |
| 17 | Mairead Sheriff (GIB) | 100.1 | 99.6 | 199.7 | 99.0 | 298.7 | 99.2 | 397.9 | |
| 18 | Kristina Hewitt (GIB) | 99.2 | 99.5 | 198.7 | 100.1 | 298.8 | 99.0 | 397.8 | |

=== Finals ===
| Rank | Name | 1 | 2 | 1-2 | 3 | 1-3 | 4 | 1-4 | 5 | 1-5 | 6 | 1-6 | 7 | 1-7 | 8 | 1-8 | 9 | 1-9 | Points | Notes |
|---|---|---|---|---|---|---|---|---|---|---|---|---|---|---|---|---|---|---|---|---|
| 1st place, gold medalist(s) | Martina Veloso (SGP) | 51.6 | 52.1 | 103.7 | 20.6 | 124.3 | 21.3 | 145.6 | 19.7 | 165.3 | 21.1 | 186.4 | 19.6 | 206.0 | 20.8 | 226.8 | 20.4 | 247.2 | 247.2 | GR Shootoff: 10.3 |
| 2nd place, silver medalist(s) | Mehuli Ghosh (IND) | 51.8 | 51.0 | 102.8 | 19.5 | 122.3 | 21.1 | 143.4 | 20.3 | 163.7 | 21.4 | 185.1 | 19.9 | 205.0 | 21.0 | 226.0 | 21.2 | 247.2 | 247.2 | GR Shootoff: 9.9 |
| 3rd place, bronze medalist(s) | Apurvi Chandela (IND) | 51.0 | 51.1 | 102.1 | 21.1 | 123.2 | 20.7 | 143.9 | 20.7 | 164.6 | 20.3 | 184.9 | 20.1 | 206.0 | 19.3 | 225.3 | - | - | 225.3 | |
| 4 | Ummey Sultana (BAN) | 49.8 | 52.5 | 102.3 | 19.5 | 121.8 | 20.7 | 142.5 | 21.1 | 163.6 | 20.1 | 183.7 | 18.3 | 202.0 | - | - | - | - | 202.0 | |
| 5 | Seonaid McIntosh (SCO) | 51.5 | 51.3 | 102.8 | 20.0 | 122.8 | 20.8 | 143.6 | 20.5 | 164.1 | 19.0 | 183.1 | - | - | - | - | - | - | 183.1 | |
| 6 | Sian Corish (WAL) | 51.4 | 49.8 | 101.2 | 19.7 | 120.9 | 20.4 | 141.3 | 18.9 | 160.2 | - | - | - | - | - | - | - | - | 160.2 | |
| 7 | Victoria Rossiter (AUS) | 50.5 | 49.9 | 100.4 | 19.8 | 120.2 | 20.0 | 140.2 | - | - | - | - | - | - | - | - | - | - | 140.2 | |
| 8 | Tessa Neo (SIN) | 20.2 | 24.0 | 44.2 | 13.1 | 57.3 | - | - | - | - | - | - | - | - | - | - | - | - | 57.3 | |
