= India at the 2018 Commonwealth Games =

- CG code: IND
- CGA: Indian Olympic Association
- Website: olympic.ind.in

in Gold Coast, Australia 4 April 2018 – 15 April 2018
- Competitors: 216 in 15 sports
- Flag bearers: Opening: P. V. Sindhu; Closing: Mary Kom
- Medals Ranked 3rd: Gold 26 Silver 20 Bronze 20 Total 66

Commonwealth Games appearances (overview)
- 1934; 1938; 1950; 1954; 1958; 1962; 1966; 1970; 1974; 1978; 1982; 1986; 1990; 1994; 1998; 2002; 2006; 2010; 2014; 2018; 2022; 2026; 2030

India competed at the 2018 Commonwealth Games at Gold Coast, Australia from 4 to 15 April 2018. It was India's 17th appearance at the Commonwealth Games. With 26 Gold medals and a total of 66 medals, India finished 3rd for the tournament. It was India's best position since the 2010 Commonwealth Games, which they hosted.

== Competitors ==
The following is a list of the number of competitors representing India that participated at the Games per India/discipline:

Sport	Men	Women	Total
Athletics	14	12	26
Badminton	5	5	10
Basketball	12	12	24
Boxing	8	4	12
Cycling	4	5	9
Gymnastics	3	4	7
Hockey	18	18	36
Lawn bowls	5	5	10
Parasports	3	5	8
Shooting	15	12	27
Squash	4	2	6
Swimming	3	2	5
Table tennis	5	5	10
Weightlifting	8	8	16
Wrestling	6	6	12
Total	113	103	216

== Medalists ==
India was the best nation in 5 disciplines, weightlifting, shooting, wrestling, badminton and table tennis, and the second best nation in boxing.

Medal	Name	Sport	Event	Date
Gold	Saikhom Mirabai Chanu	Weightlifting	Women's 48 kg	5 April
Gold	Khumukcham Sanjita Chanu	Weightlifting	Women's 53 kg	6 April
Gold	Ragala Venkat Rahul	Weightlifting	Men's 85 kg	7 April
Gold	Sathish Sivalingam	Weightlifting	Men's 77 kg	7 April
Gold	Punam Yadav	Weightlifting	Women's 69 kg	8 April
Gold	Manu Bhaker	Shooting	Women's 10 metre air pistol	8 April
Gold	Manika Batra; Mouma Das; Sutirtha Mukherjee; Madhurika Patkar; Pooja Sahasrabudhe	Table tennis	Women's team	8 April
Gold	Jitu Rai	Shooting	Men's 10 metre air pistol	9 April
Gold	Sharath Kamal; Anthony Amalraj; Harmeet Desai; Sanil Shetty; Sathiyan Gnanasekaran	Table tennis	Men's team	9 April
Gold	Pranav Chopra; Prannoy Kumar; Saina Nehwal; Ashwini Ponnappa; Satwiksairaj Rankireddy; Sikki Reddy; Chirag Shetty; Gadde Ruthvika Shivani; P V Sindhu; Kidambi Srikanth	Badminton	Mixed team	9 April
Gold	Heena Sidhu	Shooting	Women's 25 metre pistol	10 April
Gold	Shreyasi Singh	Shooting	Women's double trap	11 April
Gold	Rahul Aware	Wrestling	Men's freestyle 57 kg	12 April
Gold	Sushil Kumar	Wrestling	Men's freestyle 74 kg	12 April
Gold	Tejaswini Sawant	Shooting	Women's 50m rifle 3 positions	13 April
Gold	Anish Bhanwala	Shooting	Men's 25 metre rapid fire pistol	13 April
Gold	Bajrang Punia	Wrestling	Men's freestyle 65 kg	13 April
Gold	Mary Kom	Boxing	Women's light flyweight 48 kg	14 April
Gold	Sanjeev Rajput	Shooting	Men's 50m rifle 3 positions	14 April
Gold	Gaurav Solanki	Boxing	Men's flyweight 52 kg	14 April
Gold	Neeraj Chopra	Athletics	Men's javelin throw	14 April
Gold	Sumit Malik	Wrestling	Men's freestyle 125 kg	14 April
Gold	Vinesh Phogat	Wrestling	Women's freestyle 50 kg	14 April
Gold	Manika Batra	Table tennis	Women's singles	14 April
Gold	Vikas Krishan Yadav	Boxing	Men's middleweight 75 kg	14 April
Gold	Saina Nehwal	Badminton	Women's singles	15 April
Silver	Gururaja Poojary	Weightlifting	Men's 56 kg.	5 April
Silver	Heena Sidhu	Shooting	Women's 10 metre air pistol	8 April
Silver	Pardeep Singh	Weightlifting	Men's 105 kg	9 April
Silver	Mehuli Ghosh	Shooting	Women's 10 metre air rifle	9 April
Silver	Tejaswini Sawant	Shooting	Women's 50 metre rifle prone	12 April
Silver	Babita Kumari	Wrestling	Women's freestyle 53 kg	12 April
Silver	Seema Antil	Athletics	Women's discus throw	12 April
Silver	Anjum Moudgil	Shooting	Women's 50m rifle 3 positions	13 April
Silver	Pooja Dhanda	Wrestling	Women's freestyle 57 kg	13 April
Silver	Mausam Khatri	Wrestling	Men's freestyle 97 kg	13 April
Silver	Manika Batra; Mouma Das	Table tennis	Women's doubles	13 April
Silver	Amit Panghal	Boxing	Men's light flyweight 49 kg	14 April
Silver	Manish Kaushik	Boxing	Men's lightweight 60 kg	14 April
Silver	Dipika Pallikal Karthik; Saurav Ghosal	Squash	Mixed doubles	14 April
Silver	Sharath Kamal; Sathiyan Gnanasekaran	Table tennis	Men's doubles	14 April
Silver	Satish Kumar	Boxing	Men's super heavyweight (+91 kg)	14 April
Silver	P. V. Sindhu	Badminton	Women's singles	15 April
Silver	Dipika Pallikal Karthik; Joshna Chinappa	Squash	Women's doubles	15 April
Silver	Kidambi Srikanth	Badminton	Men's singles	15 April
Silver	Satwiksairaj Rankireddy; Chirag Shetty	Badminton	Men's doubles	15 April
Bronze	Deepak Lather	Weightlifting	Men's 69 kg	6 April
Bronze	Ravi Kumar	Shooting	Men's 10 metre air rifle	8 April
Bronze	Vikas Thakur	Weightlifting	Men's 94 kg	8 April
Bronze	Om Prakash Mitharwal	Shooting	Men's 10 metre air pistol	9 April
Bronze	Apurvi Chandela	Shooting	Women's 10 metre air rifle	9 April
Bronze	Sachin Chaudhary	Powerlifting	Men's heavyweight	10 April
Bronze	Om Prakash Mitharwal	Shooting	Men's 50 metre pistol	11 April
Bronze	Ankur Mittal	Shooting	Men's double trap	11 April
Bronze	Kiran Bishnoi	Wrestling	Women's freestyle 76 kg	12 April
Bronze	Navjeet Dhillon	Athletics	Women's discus throw	12 April
Bronze	Naman Tanwar	Boxing	Men's heavyweight 91 kg	13 April
Bronze	Divya Kakran	Wrestling	Women's freestyle 68 kg	13 April
Bronze	Mohammad Hussamuddin	Boxing	Men's bantamweight 56 kg	13 April
Bronze	Manoj Kumar	Boxing	Men's welterweight 69 kg	13 April
Bronze	Sakshi Malik	Wrestling	Women's freestyle 62 kg	14 April
Bronze	Somveer Kadian	Wrestling	Men's freestyle 86 kg	14 April
Bronze	Ashwini Ponnappa; Sikki Reddy	Badminton	Women's doubles	14 April
Bronze	Harmeet Desai; Sanil Shetty	Table tennis	Men's doubles	14 April
Bronze	Manika Batra; Sathiyan Gnanasekaran	Table tennis	Mixed doubles	15 April
Bronze	Sharath Kamal	Table tennis	Men's singles	15 April

Medals by sport
Sport	gold	silver	bronze	Total
Shooting	7	4	5	16
Wrestling	5	3	4	12
Weightlifting	5	2	2	9
Boxing	3	3	3	9
Table tennis	3	2	3	8
Badminton	2	3	1	6
Athletics	1	1	1	3
Squash	0	2	0	2
Powerlifting	0	0	1	1
Total	26	20	20	66

Medals by gender
Gender	1st place, gold medalist(s)	2nd place, silver medalist(s)	3rd place, bronze medalist(s)	Total
Male	13	9	13	35
Female	12	10	6	28
Mixed	1	1	1	3
Total	26	20	20	66

Medals by date
Day	Date	Gold medal	Silver medal	Bronze medal	Total
Day 1	5th	1	1	0	2
Day 2	6th	1	0	1	2
Day 3	7th	2	0	0	2
Day 4	8th	3	1	2	6
Day 5	9th	3	2	2	7
Day 6	10th	1	0	1	2
Day 7	11th	1	0	2	3
Day 8	12th	2	3	2	7
Day 9	13th	3	4	4	11
Day 10	14th	8	5	4	17
Day 11	15th	1	4	2	7
Total		26	20	20	66

== Athletics ==
Men
Track & road events

Athlete	Event	Heat		Semifinal		Final	
Athlete	Event	Result	Rank	Result	Rank	Result	Rank
Irfan Kolothum Thodi	20 km walk	—N/a				1:27:34	13
Manish Singh Rawat	20 km walk	—N/a				1:22:22	6
Jinson Johnson	1500 m	3:47.04	8 Q	—N/a		3:37.86 NR	5
Dharun Ayyasamy	400 m Hurdles	49.85	12	Did not advance			
Muhammed Anas Yahiya	400 m	45.96	8 Q	45.44	4 Q	45.31 NR	4
Muhammed Anas Yahiya; Dharun Ayyasamy; Amoj Jacob; Arokia Rajiv; Jeevan Karekoppa Suresh*	4 × 400 m relay	3:04.05	2 Q	—N/a		DNF	

* Competed in heats only.

Field events

Athlete	Event	Qualification		Final	
Athlete	Event	Distance	Rank	Distance	Rank
Neeraj Chopra	Javelin throw	80.42	4 Q	86.47 SB	1st place, gold medalist(s)
Vipin Kasana	Javelin throw	78.88	5 Q	77.87	5
Tajinder Pal Singh Toor	Shot put	19.10	10 Q	19.42	8
Arpinder Singh	Triple jump	16.39	2 Q	16.46	4
Rakesh Babu A V	Triple jump	15.98	12 Q	DQ	
Tejaswin Shankar	High jump	2.21	9 Q	2.24	6

Women
Track & road events

Athlete	Event	Heat		Semifinal		Final	
Athlete	Event	Result	Rank	Result	Rank	Result	Rank
Soumya B	20 kilometers walk	—N/a				DQ	
Khushbir Kaur	20 kilometers walk	—N/a				1:39:21	4
Hima Das	400 m	52.11	8 Q	51.53	7 Q	51.32 PB	6
M. R. Poovamma	400 m	53.72	24	Did not Advance			
Suriya Loganathan	10,000 m	—N/a				32:23.56 PB	13
Hima Das; M. R. Poovamma; Sonia Baishya; Sarita Gayakwad	4 × 400 m relay	—N/a				3:33.61	7

Field events

Athlete	Event	Qualification		Final	
Athlete	Event	Distance	Rank	Distance	Rank
Nayana James	Long jump	6.34	9 Q	6.14	12
Neena Pinto	Long jump	6.24	12 Q	6.19	10
Navjeet Kaur Dhillon	Discus throw	—N/a		57.43	3rd place, bronze medalist(s)
Seema Antil	Discus throw	—N/a		60.41	2nd place, silver medalist(s)

Combined Events – Heptathlon

Athlete	Event	100H	HJ	SP	200 m	LJ	JT	800 m	Total	Rank
Purnima Hembram	Result	13.56 PB	1.72 PB	11.75	25.12	5.96	41.57	2:17.44	5834 PB	7
Purnima Hembram	Points	1041	879	645	876	837	697	859	5834 PB	7

== Badminton ==
India was represented by 10 athletes, 5 men and 5 women.

Singles

Athlete	Event	Round of 64	Round of 32	Round of 16	Quarterfinal	Semifinal	Final / BM	
Athlete	Event	Opposition Score	Opposition Score	Opposition Score	Opposition Score	Opposition Score	Opposition Score	Rank
Prannoy Kumar	Men's singles	Bye	Paul (MRI); W (21–14, 21–6)	Joe (AUS); W (21–18, 21–11)	Karunaratna (SRI); W (21–13, 21–6)	Lee C W (MAS); L (16–21, 21–9, 14–21)	Ouseph (ENG); L (21–17, 23–25, 9–21)	4
Srikanth Kidambi	Men's singles	Bye	Lubah (MRI); W (21–13, 21–10)	Karunaratne (SRI); W (21–10, 21–10)	Ng (SGP); W (21–15, 21–12)	Ouseph (ENG); W (21–10, 21–17)	Lee C W (MAS); L (21–19, 14–21, 14–21)	2nd place, silver medalist(s)
Saina Nehwal	Women's singles	Bye	Villiers (RSA); W (21–3, 21–1)	Li (IOM); W (21–4, 2–0) (ret.)	Honderich (CAN); W (21–8, 21–13)	Gilmour (SCO); W (21–14, 18–21, 21–17)	Sindhu (IND); W (21–18, 23–21)	1st place, gold medalist(s)
Gadde Ruthvika Shivani	Women's singles	Bye	Atipaka (GHA); W (21–5, 21–7)	Yeo J M (SGP); W (21–10, 21–23, 21–10)	Gilmour (SCO); L (5–9) (ret.)	Did not advance		
P. V. Sindhu	Women's singles	Bye	Whiteside (FIJ); W (21–6, 21–3)	Chen H-y (AUS); W (21–15, 21–9)	Tam (CAN); W (21–14, 21–17)	Li (CAN); W (21–18, 21–8)	Nehwal (IND); L (18–21, 21–23)	2nd place, silver medalist(s)

Doubles

Athlete	Event	Round of 64	Round of 32	Round of 16	Quarterfinal	Semifinal	Final / BM	
Athlete	Event	Opposition Score	Opposition Score	Opposition Score	Opposition Score	Opposition Score	Opposition Score	Rank
Satwiksairaj Rankireddy; Chirag Shetty	Men's doubles	—N/a	Bye	Lubah / Paul (MRI); W (21–8, 21–12)	Chan P S / Goh S H (MAS); W (21–14, 15–21, 21–9)	Dias / Goonethilleka (SRI); W (21–18, 21–10)	Ellis / Langridge (ENG); L(13–21, 16–21)	2nd place, silver medalist(s)
Ashwini Ponnappa; N. Sikki Reddy	Women's doubles	—N/a	Bye	Ong R-n / Wong (SGP); W (21–18, 21–13)	Ambalangodage / Beruwelage (SRI); W (21–11, 21–13)	Chow M K / Hoo (MAS); L (21–17, 15–21, 4–21)	Mapasa / Somerville (AUS); W (21–19, 21–19)	3rd place, bronze medalist(s)
Ashwini Ponnappa; Satwiksairaj Rankireddy	Mixed doubles	Hardy / Le Tissier (GUE); W (21–9, 21–5)	Lane / Pugh (ENG); W (21–17, 21–16)	Tsai / Yakura (CAN); W (21–10, 21–7)	Goh S H / S J Lai (MAS); W (21–19, 21–19)	Ellis / Smith (ENG); L (22–20, 18–21, 16–21)	Chan P S / Goh L Y (MAS); L (19–21, 19–21)	4
N. Sikki Reddy; Pranav Chopra	Mixed doubles	Bye	Molia / Gibson (FIJ); W (21–8, 21–9)	Chrisnanta / Wong (SGP); W (21–19, 21–13)	Chan P S / Goh L Y (MAS); L (17–21, 12–21)	Did not advance		

Mixed team

Summary

Team	Event	Group stage				Quarterfinal	Semifinal	Final	
Team	Event	Opposition Score	Opposition Score	Opposition Score	Rank	Opposition Score	Opposition Score	Opposition Score	Rank
India	Mixed team	Sri Lanka; W 5–0	Pakistan; W 5–0	Scotland; W 5–0	1 Q	Mauritius; W 3–0	Singapore; W 3–1	Malaysia; W 3–1	1st place, gold medalist(s)

Roster

- Pranav Chopra
- Srikanth Kidambi
- Prannoy Kumar
- Saina Nehwal
- Ashwini Ponnappa
- Satwiksairaj Rankireddy
- N. Sikki Reddy
- Chirag Shetty
- Gadde Ruthvika Shivani
- P V Sindhu

Pool A

Pos	Team	Pld	W	L	MF	MA	MD	GF	GA	GD	PF	PA	PD	Pts	Qualification
1	India	3	3	0	15	0	+15	30	1	+29	651	401	+250	3	Knockout stage
2	Scotland	3	2	1	9	6	+3	19	13	+6	592	476	+116	2	Knockout stage
3	Sri Lanka	3	1	2	5	10	−5	12	21	−9	526	619	−93	1	
4	Pakistan	3	0	3	1	14	−13	2	28	−26	348	621	−273	0	

Source: GC2018

India
5
Carrara Sports and Leisure Centre, Gold Coast
5 April

Sri Lanka
0

			1	2	3
1	(India) (Sri Lanka)	Pranav Chopra / Gadde Ruthvika Shivani; Sachin Dias / Thilini Hendahewa	21; 15	19; 21	22; 20
2	(India) (Sri Lanka)	Srikanth Kidambi; Niluka Karunaratne	21; 16	21; 10
3	(India) (Sri Lanka)	Satwiksairaj Rankireddy / Chirag Shetty; Dinuka Karunaratna / Buwaneka Goonethilleka	21; 17	21; 14
4	(India) (Sri Lanka)	Saina Nehwal; Madushika Beruwelage	21; 8	21; 4
5	(India) (Sri Lanka)	Ashwini Ponnappa / N. Sikki Reddy; Thilini Hendahewa / Kavidi Sirimannage	21; 12	21; 14

India
5
Carrara Sports and Leisure Centre, Gold Coast
5 April

Pakistan
0

			1	2	3
1	(India) (Pakistan)	Satwiksairaj Rankireddy / N. Sikki Reddy; Muhammad Irfan Saeed Bhatti / Palwasha Bashir	21; 10	21; 13
2	(India) (Pakistan)	Srikanth Kidambi; Murad Ali	21; 16	22; 20
3	(India) (Pakistan)	Saina Nehwal; Mahoor Shahzad	21; 7	21; 11
4	(India) (Pakistan)	Pranaav Jerry Chopra / Chirag Shetty; Muhammad Irfan Saeed Bhatti / Murad Ali	21; 9	21; 15
5	(India) (Pakistan)	Ashwini Ponnappa / Gadde Ruthvika Shivani; Mahoor Shahzad / Palwasha Bashir	21; 6	21; 10

India
5
Carrara Sports and Leisure Centre, Gold Coast
6 April

Scotland
0

			1	2	3
1	(India) (Scotland)	Saina Nehwal; Julie MacPherson	21; 14	21; 12
2	(India) (Scotland)	Srikanth Kidambi; Kieran Merrilees	21; 18	21; 2
3	(India) (Scotland)	N. Sikki Reddy / Ashwini Ponnappa; Kirsty Gilmour / Eleanor O'Donnell	21; 8	21; 12
4	(India) (Scotland)	Satwiksairaj Rankireddy / Chirag Shetty; Patrick MacHugh / Adam Hall	21; 16	21; 19
5	(India) (Scotland)	Pranaav Jerry Chopra / N. Sikki Reddy; Martin Campbell / Julie MacPherson	21; 17	21; 15

Quarterfinals

India
3
Carrara Sports and Leisure Centre, Gold Coast
7 April

Mauritius
0

			1	2	3
1	(India) (Mauritius)	Satwiksairaj Rankireddy / Chirag Shetty; Aatish Lubah / Christopher Jean Paul	21; 12	21; 3
2	(India) (Mauritius)	Ashwini Ponnappa / N. Sikki Reddy; Aurélie Allet / Nicki Chan-Lam	21; 8	21; 7
3	(India) (Mauritius)	Srikanth Kidambi; Julien Paul	21; 12	21; 14
4	(India) (Mauritius)	Saina Nehwal; Kate Foo Kune				not played
5	(India) (Mauritius)	Satwiksairaj Rankireddy / N. Sikki Reddy; Julien Paul / Aurélie Allet				not played

Semifinals

India
3
Carrara Sports and Leisure Centre, Gold Coast
8 April

Singapore
1

			1	2	3
1	(India) (Singapore)	Satwiksairaj Rankireddy / Ashwini Ponnappa; Terry Hee / Crystal Wong	22; 20	21; 18
2	(India) (Singapore)	Srikanth Kidambi; Loh Kean Yew	21; 17	21; 14
3	(India) (Singapore)	Satwiksairaj Rankireddy / Chirag Shetty; Terry Hee / Danny Bawa Chrisnanta	21; 17	19; 21	12; 21
4	(India) (Singapore)	Saina Nehwal; Yeo Jia Min	21; 8	21; 15
5	(India) (Singapore)	Ashwini Ponnappa / N. Sikki Reddy; Ren-ne Ong / Crystal Wong				not played

Final

India
3
Carrara Sports and Leisure Centre, Gold Coast
9 April

Malaysia
1

			1	2	3
1	(India) (Malaysia)	Satwiksairaj Rankireddy / Ashwini Ponnappa; Chan Peng Soon / Goh Liu Ying	21; 14	15; 21	21; 15
2	(India) (Malaysia)	Srikanth Kidambi; Lee Chong Wei	21; 17	21; 14
3	(India) (Malaysia)	Satwiksairaj Rankireddy / Chirag Shetty; Goh V Shem / Tan Wee Kiong	15; 21	20; 22
4	(India) (Malaysia)	Saina Nehwal; Soniia Cheah	21; 11	19; 21	21; 9
5	(India) (Malaysia)	N. Sikki Reddy / Ashwini Ponnappa; Vivian Hoo / Chow Mei Kuan				not played

== Basketball ==
India has qualified a men's and women's basketball teams for a total of 24 athletes (12 men and 12 women). Both teams were invited by FIBA and the CGF.

Summary

Key:

- FT = After full time
- P = Match decided by penalty-shootout

Team	Event	Preliminary round				Qualifying finals	Semifinal	Final / BM	
Team	Event	Opposition Result	Opposition Result	Opposition Result	Rank	Opposition Result	Opposition Result	Opposition Result	Rank
India men	Men's tournament	Cameroon; L 87–96	England; L 54–100	Scotland; L 81–96	4	Did not advance			
India women	Women's tournament	Jamaica; L 57–66	Malaysia; L 72–85	New Zealand; L 55–90	4	Did not advance			

=== Men's tournament ===
Roster

- Ravi Bhardwaj
- Arvind Arumugam
- Satnam Bhamara
- Arshpreet Bhullar
- Aravind Annadurai
- Akilan Pari
- Justin Joseph
- Jeevanantham Pandi
- Yadwinder Singh
- Joginder Singh
- Amritpal Singh
- Amjyot Gill

Pool B

Team	Pld	W	L	PF	PA	PD	Pts	Qualification
Scotland	3	3	0	237	198	+39	6	Qualifying finals
England	3	2	1	246	186	+60	5	Qualifying finals
Cameroon	3	1	2	202	231	−29	4	
India	3	0	3	222	292	−70	3	

5 April 2018
20:00

Boxscore

Cameroon	96–87	India
Scoring by quarter: 15–27, 24–36, 23–13, 34–11
Pts: Kome 21; Rebs: Tsaace 13; Asts: Ngijol 3		Pts: At. Singh 23; Rebs: Annadurai 12; Asts: J. Singh 8

Townsville Entertainment and Convention Centre, Townsville
Referees: Michael Weiland (CAN), Ryan Jones (NZL)

7 April 2018
17:30

Boxscore

England	100–54	India
Scoring by quarter: 19–15, 27–9, 29–11, 25–19
Pts: Thoseby 20; Rebs: Walker 8 Asts: Jones 6		Pts: Annadurai 22; Rebs: Y. Singh 7 Asts: At. Singh 5

Townsville Entertainment and Convention Centre, Townsville
Referees: Takaki Kato (JPN), Ryan Jones (NZL)

8 April 2018
21:00

Boxscore

India	81–96	Scotland
Scoring by quarter: 26–33, 15–16, 11–29, 29–18
Pts: J. Singh 27; Rebs: J. Singh 14; Asts: At. Singh 7		Pts: Collins 16; Rebs: Vigor 12; Asts: Vigor 7

Townsville Entertainment and Convention Centre, Townsville
Referees: Kingsley Ojeaburu (NGR), Matthew Bathurst (NZL)

=== Women's tournament ===
Roster

The following is the India roster in the women's basketball tournament of the 2018 Commonwealth Games.

India women's national basketball team - 2018 Commonwealth Games roster
Players
Coaches

Pos.	No.	Name	Age – Date of birth	Height	Club	Ctr.
F	4	Anjana Prasannan Geetha	23 – 9 November 1994	1.77 m (5 ft 10 in)	Kerala	(India)
G	5	Barkha Sonkar	21 – 24 December 1996	1.56 m (5 ft 1 in)	Uttar Pradesh	(India)
F	6	Raspreet Sidhu	28 – 18 July 1989	1.69 m (5 ft 7 in)	Delhi	(India)
G/F	8	Grima Merlin Varghese	23 – 29 March 1995	1.74 m (5 ft 9 in)	Kerala	(India)
C	9	Anmolpreet Kaur	18 – 24 November 1999	1.85 m (6 ft 1 in)	Punjab	(India)
F	10	Navaneetha Pattemane Udayakumar	23 – 28 July 1994	1.78 m (5 ft 10 in)	Railways	(India)
F	12	Rajapriyadharshini Rajaganapathi	24 – 3 January 1994	1.78 m (5 ft 10 in)	Railways	(India)
F	13	Jeena Palanilkumkalayil Skaria	24 – 9 January 1994	1.78 m (5 ft 10 in)	Kerala	(India)
C	14	Shireen Limaye	23 – 13 February 1995	1.87 m (6 ft 2 in)	Maharashtra	(India)
G	15	Sruthi Menon	22 – 21 February 1996	1.70 m (5 ft 7 in)	Railways	(India)
G	18	Bhandavya Hemmige Mahesha	19 – 18 April 1998	1.63 m (5 ft 4 in)	Karnataka	(India)
G	19	Madhu Kumari	22 – 9 July 1995	1.65 m (5 ft 5 in)	Railways	(India)

Head coach

- (Serbia) Zoran Višić

Assistant coach(es)

- (India) Shiba Maggon

Legend

- (C) Team captain
- Club - describes last
  club before the tournament
- Age - describes age
  on 5 April 2018

Pool B

Pos	Team	Pld	W	L	PF	PA	PD	Pts	Qualification
1	New Zealand	3	3	0	256	148	+108	6	Qualifying finals
2	Jamaica	3	2	1	196	195	+1	5	Qualifying finals
3	Malaysia	3	1	2	187	239	−52	4	
4	India	3	0	3	184	241	−57	3	

Source: GC2018
Rules for classification: 1) Points; 2) Head-to-head results; 3) Points difference; 4) Points scored.

5 April 2018
18:30

Boxscore

Jamaica	66–57	India
Scoring by quarter: 16–14, 15–13, 17–16, 18–14
Pts: George 19; Rebs: George 19; Asts: Dixon 6		Pts: Limaye 18; Rebs: Limaye, Sidhu 5 Asts: Sonkar 4

Cairns Convention Centre, Cairns
Referees: Artur Decastro (MOZ), Chris Dodds (SCO), Christine Vuong (CAN)

7 April 2018
18:30

Boxscore

Malaysia	85–72	India
Scoring by quarter: 20–25, 28–12, 11–18, 26–17
Pts: Yap 18; Rebs: Ting 6 Asts: Saw 6		Pts: Skaria 19; Rebs: Skaria 13; Asts: Sonkar 4

Cairns Convention Centre, Cairns
Referees: Viola Gyorgyi (NOR), Sarah Carey (AUS), Kate Webb (ENG)

8 April 2018
17:30

Boxscore

India	55–90	New Zealand
Scoring by quarter: 12–31, 10–23, 19–19, 14–17
Pts: Kumari 14; Rebs: Skaria 9 Asts: Limaye, Sidhu 3		Pts: Cocks 21; Rebs: Farnworth 7 Asts: Farnworth 5

Cairns Convention Centre, Cairns
Referees: James Boyer (AUS), Christine Vuong (CAN), Simon Unsworth (ENG)

== Boxing ==
India was represented by 12 athletes, 8 men and 4 women.

Men

Athlete	Event	Round of 32	Round of 16	Quarterfinals	Semifinals	Final	
Athlete	Event	Opposition Result	Opposition Result	Opposition Result	Opposition Result	Opposition Result	Rank
Amit Panghal	49 kg	—N/a	Tetteh (GHA); W 5–0	Ahmed (SCO); W 4–1	Miiro (UGA); W 5–0	Yafai (ENG); L 1–3	2nd place, silver medalist(s)
Gaurav Solanki	52 kg	—N/a	Ampiah (GHA); W 5–0	Keama (PNG); W 5–0	Bandara (SRI); W 4–0	Irvine (NIR); W 4–1	1st place, gold medalist(s)
Mohammed Hussamuddin	56 kg	—N/a	Warawara (VAN); W 5–0	Mulenga (ZAM); W 5–0	McGrail (ENG); L 0–5	Did not advance	3rd place, bronze medalist(s)
Manish Kaushik	60 kg	Bye	Alexander (TTO); W 4–0	French (ENG); W 5–0	McGivern (NIR); W 4–1	Garside (AUS); L 2–3	2nd place, silver medalist(s)
Manoj Kumar	69 kg	Umeh (NGR); W 5–0	Mbundwike (TAN); W 5–0	Nickolas (AUS); W 4–1	McCormack (ENG); L 0–5	Did not advance	3rd place, bronze medalist(s)
Vikas Krishan	75 kg	Bye	Somerville (AUS); W 5–0	Muziyo (ZAM); W 5–0	Donnelly (NIR); W 5–0	Ntsengue (CMR); W 5–0	1st place, gold medalist(s)
Naman Tanwar	91 kg	—N/a	Mhando (TAN); W 5–0	Masoe (SAM); W 5–0	Whateley (AUS); L 0–4	Did not advance	3rd place, bronze medalist(s)
Satish Kumar	+91 kg	—N/a	Bye	Paul (TTO); W 4–1	Agnes (SEY); W 4–1	Clarke (ENG); L 0–5	2nd place, silver medalist(s)

Women

Athlete	Event	Round of 16	Quarterfinals	Semifinals	Final	
Athlete	Event	Opposition Result	Opposition Result	Opposition Result	Opposition Result	Rank
M C Mary Kom	48 kg	—N/a	Gordon (SCO); W 5–0	Koddithuwakku (SRI); W 5–0	O'Hara (NIR); W 5–0	1st place, gold medalist(s)
Pinki Rani	51 kg	—N/a	Whiteside (ENG); L 2–3	Did not advance		
Laishram Sarita Devi	60 kg	Gittens (BAR); W 5–0	Stridsman (AUS); L 0–5	Did not advance		
Lovlina Borgohain	69 kg	Bye	Ryan (ENG); L 2–3	Did not advance		

== Cycling ==
India participated with 9 athletes (4 men and 5 women).

=== Track ===
Sprint

Athlete	Event	Qualification		Round 1	Quarterfinals	Semifinals	Final	
Athlete	Event	Time	Rank	Opposition Time	Opposition Time	Opposition Time	Opposition Time	Rank
Sahil Kumar	Men's individual	10.584	22	Did not advance				
Sanuraj Sanandaraj	Men's individual	10.381	20	Did not advance				
Ranjit Singh	Men's individual	10.486	21	Did not advance				
Sahil Kumar; Sanuraj Sanandaraj; Ranjit Singh	Men's team	46.174	7	—N/a			Did not advance	
Deborah Herold	Women's individual	11.484 Q	13	McCulloch (AUS); L 12.028	Did not advance			
Aleena Reji	Women's individual	12.207 Q	16	Morton (AUS); L 12.541	Did not advance			
Deborah Herold; Aleena Reji	Women's team	35.309	6	—N/a			Did not advance	

Keirin

Athlete	Event	Round 1	Repechage	Semifinals	Final
Athlete	Event	Rank	Rank	Rank	Rank
Sahil Kumar	Men	4 R	3	Did not advance	
Sanuraj Sanandaraj	Men	5 R	3	Did not advance	
Ranjit Singh	Men	4 R	4	Did not advance	
Deborah Herold	Women	4 R	4	Did not advance	
Aleena Reji	Women	5 R	4	Did not advance	

Time trial

Athlete	Event	Time	Rank
Sahil Kumar	Men	1:05.538	20
Sanuraj Sanandaraj	Men	1:06.097	22
Ranjit Singh	Men	1:05.671	21
Deborah Herold	Women	36.176	13
Aleena Reji	Women	36.308	14

Pursuit

Athlete	Event	Qualification		Final	
Athlete	Event	Time	Rank	Opponent Results	Rank
Manjeet Singh	Men's individual	4:39.744	24	Did not advance	
Sonali Mayanglambam	Women's individual	3:59.028	20	Did not advance	
Monorama Tongbram	Women's individual	4:12.437	22	Did not advance	
Deborah Herold; Amritha Geethakumari; Sonali Mayanglambam; Aleena Reji; Monorama Tongbram	Women's team	5:05.668	7	Did not advance	

Points race

Athlete	Event	Qualification		Final	
Athlete	Event	Points	Rank	Points	Rank
Manjeet Singh	Men	0	14	Did not advance	
Sonali Mayanglambam	Women	DNS		Did not advance	
Monorama Tongbram	Women	DNF		Did not advance	

Scratch race

Athlete	Event	Qualification	Final
Manjeet Singh	Men	13	Did not advance
Sonali Mayanglambam	Women	—N/a	DNF
Monorama Tongbram	Women	—N/a	DNF

== Gymnastics ==
India was represented by 7 athletes, 3 men and 4 women.

=== Artistic ===
Men
Team Final & Individual Qualification

Athlete	Event	Apparatus						Total	Rank
Athlete	Event	F	PH	R	V	PB	HB	Total	Rank
Ashish Kumar	Team	13.050	11.150	11.300	13.150	12.650	10.400	71.700	25
Rakesh Patra	Team	—N/a		13.950 Q	—N/a	13.350	—N/a		
Yogeshwar Singh	Team	12.450	12.750	12.350	13.050	12.300	12.400	75.300	21 Q
Total	Team	25.500	23.900	37.600	26.200	38.300	22.800	174.300	9

Individual Finals

Athlete	Event	Apparatus						Total	Rank
Athlete	Event	F	PH	R	V	PB	HB	Total	Rank
Rakesh Patra	Rings	—N/a		12.933	—N/a			12.933	8
Yogeshwar Singh	All-around	11.400	12.250	12.600	14.100	13.000	12.250	75.600	14

Women
Team Final & Individual Qualification

Athlete	Event	Apparatus					
Athlete	Event	V	UB	BB	F	Total	Rank
Pranati Das	Team	12.600	9.750	10.150	11.300	43.800	21 Q
Pranati Nayak	Team	13.250 Q	9.775	9.400	10.250	42.675	24
Aruna Reddy	Team	13.200	9.800	10.150	10.350	43.500	22 Q
Total	Team	39.050	29.325	29.700	31.900	128.975	7

Individual events

Athlete	Event	Apparatus				Total	Rank
Athlete	Event	V	UB	BB	F	Total	Rank
Pranati Das	All-around	12.900	10.050	9.900	11.050	43.900	16
Aruna Reddy	All-around	13.650	10.200	9.000	11.550	44.400	14
Pranati Nayak	Vault	11.983	—N/a			11.983	8

=== Rhythmic ===
Women
Individual

Athlete	Event	Qualification						Final					
Athlete	Event	Hoop	Ball	Clubs	Ribbon	Total	Rank	Hoop	Ball	Clubs	Ribbon	Total	Rank
Meghana Reddy	Individual	9.900	7.300	10.000	7.400	34.600	23	Did not advance					

== Hockey ==
India has qualified a men's and a women's team for a total of 36 athletes (18 men and 18 women) based on the FIH World Rankings as of 31 October 2017.

Summary

Key:

- FT = After full time
- P = Match decided by penalty-shootout

Team	Event	Preliminary round					Semifinal	Final / BM / PM	
Team	Event	Opposition Result	Opposition Result	Opposition Result	Opposition Result	Rank	Opposition Result	Opposition Result	Rank
India men	Men's tournament	Pakistan; D 2–2	Wales; W 4–3	Malaysia; W 2–1	England; W 4–3	1 Q	New Zealand; L 2–3	England; L 1–2	4
India women	Women's tournament	Wales; L 2–3	Malaysia; W 4–1	England; W 2–1	South Africa; W 1–0	2 Q	Australia; L 0–1	England; L 0–6	4

=== Men's tournament ===
Team

Hockey India announced the team of 18 members which was led by Manpreet Singh.
Squad:
Goalkeepers: Sreejesh Parattu Raveendran, Suraj Karkera
Defenders: Rupinder Pal Singh, Harmanpreet Singh, Varun Kumar, Kothajit Singh, Gurinder Singh, Amit Rohidas
Midfielders: Manpreet Singh (C), Chinglensana Singh Kangujam (VC), Sumit, Vivek Sagar Prasad
Forwards: Akashdeep Singh, S.V. Sunil, Gurjant Singh, Mandeep Singh, Lalit Upadhyay, Dilpreet Singh

Preliminary round
Pool B

Pos	Team	Pld	W	D	L	GF	GA	GD	Pts	Qualification
1	India	4	3	1	0	12	9	+3	10	Advance to Semi-finals
2	England	4	2	1	1	15	8	+7	7	Advance to Semi-finals
3	Malaysia	4	1	1	2	5	10	−5	4	5th–6th place match
4	Pakistan	4	0	4	0	6	6	0	4	7th–8th place match
5	Wales	4	0	1	3	6	11	−5	1	9th–10th place match

Source: FIH
Rules for classification: 1) points; 2) number of wins; 3) goal difference; 4) goals scored; 5) head-to-head results.

7 April 2018
14:30

India	2–2	Pakistan
D. Singh 13'; H. Singh 20'	Report	Md. Irfan Jr 39'; Ali 60'

Umpires:
Lim Hong Zhen (SGP)
David Sweetman (SCO)

8 April 2018
19:30

India	4–3	Wales
D. Singh 16'; Mand. Singh 28'; H. Singh 57'; Sunil 59'	Report	Furlong 17', 45', 58'

Umpires:
David Sweetman (SCO)
Tyler Klenk (CAN)

10 April 2018
09:30

India	2–1	Malaysia
H. Singh 3', 44'	Report	Saari 16'

Umpires:
Lim Hong Zhen (SGP)
Tyler Klenk (CAN)

11 April 2018
19:30

India	4–3	England
Manp. Singh 33'; R.P. Singh 51'; Kumar 59'; Mand. Singh 60'	Report	Condon 17'; Ansell 52'; Ward 56'

Umpires:
Sean Rapaport (RSA)
Rawi Anbananthan (MAS)

Semi-finals

13 April 2018
21:45

India	2–3	New Zealand
H. Singh 30', 56'	Report	Inglis 7'; Jenness 13'; Child 40'

Umpires:
Lim Hong Zhen (SGP)
Rawi Anbananthan (MAS)

Bronze medal match

14 April 2018
19:00

England	2–1	India
Ward 7', 43'	Report	Kumar 27'

Umpires:
Rawi Anbananthan (MAS)
David Sweetman (SCO)

=== Women's tournament ===
Hockey India has announced the team which was led by Rani Rampal.
Squad:
Goalkeepers: Savita (VC), Rajani Etimarpu
Defenders: Deepika, Sunita Lakra, Deep Grace Ekka, Gurjit Kaur, Sushila Chanu Pukhrambam
Midfielders: Monika, Namita Toppo, Nikki Pradhan, Neha Goyal, Lilima Minz
Forwards: Rani (C), Vandana Kataria, Lalremsiami, Navjot Kaur, Navneet Kaur, Poonam Rani

Preliminary round
Pool A

Pos	Team	Pld	W	D	L	GF	GA	GD	Pts	Qualification
1	England	4	3	0	1	11	3	+8	9	Advance to Semi-finals
2	India	4	3	0	1	9	5	+4	9	Advance to Semi-finals
3	South Africa	4	1	1	2	3	4	−1	4	5th–6th place match
4	Malaysia	4	1	1	2	3	8	−5	4	7th–8th place match
5	Wales	4	1	0	3	4	10	−6	3	9th–10th place match

Source: FIH
Rules for classification: 1) points; 2) number of wins; 3) goal difference; 4) goals scored; 5) head-to-head results.

5 April 2018
09:30

India	2–3	Wales
Rampal 34'; Pradhan 41'	Report	Daley 7'; French 26'; Marke-Jones 57'

Umpires:
Aleisha Neumann (AUS)
Jo Cumming (NZL)

6 April 2018
14:30

India	4–1	Malaysia
G. Kaur 6', 39'; Rampal 56'; Lalremsiami 59'	Report	Nuraini 38'

Umpires:
Emma Shelbourn (GBR)
Cookie Tan (SGP)

8 April 2018
09:30

England	1–2	India
Danson 1'	Report	Navn. Kaur 42'; G. Kaur 48'

Umpires:
Aleisha Neumann (AUS)
Cookie Tan (SGP)

10 April 2018
19:30

India	1–0	South Africa
Rampal 47'	Report

Umpires:
Sarah Wilson (SCO)
Catherine Wright (WAL)

Semi-finals

12 April 2018
21:15

Australia	1–0	India
Stewart 37'	Report

Umpires:
Ayanna McClean (TTO)
Lelia Sacre (CAN)

Bronze medal match

14 April 2018
10:30

England	6–0	India
Webb 27'; Bray 44', 49', 56'; Unsworth 55'; Danson 57'	Report

Umpires:
Aleisha Neumann (AUS)
Lelia Sacre (CAN)

== Lawn bowls ==
India was represented by 10 athletes, 5 men and 5 women.

Men

Athlete	Event	Group stage						Quarterfinal	Semifinal	Final / BM	
Athlete	Event	Opposition Score	Opposition Score	Opposition Score	Opposition Score	Opposition Score	Rank	Opposition Score	Opposition Score	Opposition Score	Rank
Krishna Xalxo	Singles	Kimani (KEN); W 21–12	Paxton (ENG); L 19–21	Kumar (FIJ); W 21–11	Newell (JAM); L 18–21	McIlroy (NZL); L 0–21	4	Did not advance			
Alok Lakra; Krishna Xalxo	Pairs	Malaysia; L 13–27	Niue; W 29–6	Scotland; L 12–17	Samoa; W 26–4	Norfolk Island; L 7–17	4	Did not advance			
Sunil Bahadur; Dinesh Kumar; Chandan Singh	Triples	Wales; L 9–23	Papua New Guinea; W 16–11	England; L 14–15	South Africa; W 18–17	—N/a	3	Did not advance			
Sunil Bahadur; Dinesh Kumar; Alok Lakra; Chandan Singh	Fours	South Africa; W 19–7	Botswana; W 16–9	Australia; W 19–15	Norfolk Island; W 25–7	—N/a	1 Q	Wales; L 15–17	Did not advance		

Women

Athlete	Event	Group stage						Quarterfinal	Semifinal	Final / BM	
Athlete	Event	Opposition Score	Opposition Score	Opposition Score	Opposition Score	Opposition Score	Rank	Opposition Score	Opposition Score	Opposition Score	Rank
Pinki Singh	Singles	Edwards (NZL); L 16–20	Rednall (ENG); L 11–21	Tikoisuva (FIJ); L 12–21	Saroji (MAS); L 9–21	Blumsky (NIU); W 21–9	5	Did not advance			
Lovely Choubey; Rupa Rani Tirkey	Pairs	Wales; W 20–16	Jersey; W 22–12	Northern Ireland; L 14–15	South Africa; L 17–19	—N/a	2 Q	Malaysia; L 11–17	Did not advance		
Farzana Khan; Pinki Singh; Nayanmoni Saikia	Triples	Fiji; L 15–23	Papua New Guinea; W 24–6	Australia; L 11–20	Canada; L 10–19	—N/a	4	Did not advance			
Lovely Choubey; Farzana Khan; Nayanmoni Saikia; Rupa Rani Tirkey	Fours	Northern Ireland; W 18–10	Malta; L 15–20	England; W 21–9	Fiji; W 24–9	—N/a	1 Q	Malta; L 11–13	Did not advance		

== Powerlifting ==
India participated with 4 athletes (3 men and 1 woman).

Athlete	Event	Result	Rank
Farman Basha	Men's lightweight	169.4	5
Ashok Malik	Men's lightweight	DNF	
Sachin Chaudhary	Men's heavyweight	181.0	3rd place, bronze medalist(s)
Sakina Khatun	Women's lightweight	93.2	5

== Shooting ==
Men

Athlete	Event	Qualification		Final	
Athlete	Event	Points	Rank	Points	Rank
Deepak Kumar	10m air rifle	627.2	1 Q	162.3	6
Ravi Kumar	10m air rifle	626.8	2 Q	224.1	3rd place, bronze medalist(s)
Jitu Rai	10m air pistol	570-15x	4 Q	235.1 GR	1st place, gold medalist(s)
Om Prakash Mitharwal	10m air pistol	584-26x	1 Q	214.3	3rd place, bronze medalist(s)
Anish Bhanwala	25m rapid fire pistol	580-22x	1 Q	30 GR	1st place, gold medalist(s)
Neeraj Kumar	25m rapid fire pistol	579-14x	2 Q	13	5
Jitu Rai	50m pistol	542-8x	6 Q	105.0	8
Om Prakash Mitharwal	50m pistol	549-6x	1 Q	201.1	3rd place, bronze medalist(s)
Sanjeev Rajput	50m rifle 3 positions	1180-58x	1 Q QGR	454.5 GR	1st place, gold medalist(s)
Chain Singh	50m rifle 3 positions	1166-50x	2 Q	419.1	5
Chain Singh	50m rifle prone	614.2	6 Q	204.8	4
Gagan Narang	50m rifle prone	617	3 Q	142.3	7
Manavjit Singh Sandhu	Trap	115	8	Did not advance	
Kynan Chenai	Trap	117 (3 S-off)	7	Did not advance	
Mohammed Asab	Double trap	137 (5 S-off)	2 Q	43	4
Ankur Mittal	Double trap	133	5 Q	53	3rd place, bronze medalist(s)
Smit Singh	Skeet	119 (1 S-off)	6 Q	15	6
Sheeraz Sheikh	Skeet	117	10	Did not advance	

Women

Athlete	Event	Qualification		Final	
Athlete	Event	Points	Rank	Points	Rank
Apurvi Chandela	10m air rifle	423.2	1 Q QGR	225.3	3rd place, bronze medalist(s)
Mehuli Ghosh	10m air rifle	413.7	5 Q	247.2 (9.9 S-off)	2nd place, silver medalist(s)
Manu Bhaker	10m air pistol	383-10x	1 Q	240.9 GR	1st place, gold medalist(s)
Heena Sidhu	10m air pistol	379-6x	2 Q	234.0	2nd place, silver medalist(s)
Heena Sidhu	25m pistol	579-21x	3 Q	38 GR	1st place, gold medalist(s)
Annu Singh	25m pistol	584-13x	2 Q	15	6
Anjum Moudgil	50m rifle 3 positions	589-32x	1 Q QGR	455.7	2nd place, silver medalist(s)
Tejaswini Sawant	50m rifle 3 positions	582-31x	3 Q	457.9 GR	1st place, gold medalist(s)
Anjum Moudgil	50m rifle prone	—N/a		602.2	16
Tejaswini Sawant	50m rifle prone	—N/a		618.9	2nd place, silver medalist(s)
Shreyasi Singh	Trap	67 (3 S-off)	4 Q	19	5
Seema Tomar	Trap	61	11	Did not advance	
Shreyasi Singh	Double trap	—N/a		96 (2 S-off)	1st place, gold medalist(s)
Varsha Varman	Double trap	—N/a		86	4
Saniya Shaikh	Skeet	71	2 Q	32	4
Maheshwari Chauhan	Skeet	68	8	Did not advance	

== Squash ==
Team of 6 athletes represented India at the squash competition in the 2018 Commonwealth Games.

Individual

Athlete	Event	Round of 64	Round of 32	Round of 16	Quarterfinals	Semifinals	Final/BM	
Athlete	Event	Opposition Score	Opposition Score	Opposition Score	Opposition Score	Opposition Score	Opposition Score	Rank
Saurav Ghosal	Men's singles	Bye	Binnie (JAM); L 2–3	Did not advance				
Harinder Pal Sandhu	Men's singles	Stafford (CAY); W 3–1	Yuen (MAS); L 0–3	Did not advance				
Vikram Malhotra	Men's singles	Chilambwe (ZAM); W 3–0	Koenig (MRI); W 3–0	Matthew (ENG); L 1–3	Did not advance			
Joshna Chinappa	Women's singles	Bye	Vai (PNG); W 3–0	Saxby (AUS); W 3–0	King (NZL); L 0–3	Did not advance		
Dipika Pallikal Karthik	Women's singles	Bye	Knaggs (TRI); W 3–0	Waters (ENG); L 0–3	Did not advance			

Doubles

Athlete	Event	Group stage				Round of 16	Quarterfinals	Semifinals	Final/BM	
Athlete	Event	Opposition Score	Opposition Score	Opposition Score	Rank	Opposition Score	Opposition Score	Opposition Score	Opposition Score	Rank
Vikram Malhotra; Ramit Tandon	Men's doubles	Creed / Makin (WAL); W 2–1	Jombla / Mansaray (SLE); W 2–0 (w/o)	—N/a	1 Q	Binnie / Walters (JAM); W 2–0	James / Willstrop (ENG); L 1–2	Did not advance		
Joshna Chinappa; Dipika Pallikal Karthik	Women's doubles	F Zafar / M Zafar (PAK); W 2–1	Evans / Saffery (WAL); W 2–1	Kellas / Sultana (MLT); W 2–0	1 Q	—N/a	Cornett / Todd (CAN); W 2–1	Massaro / Perry (ENG); W 2–0	King / Landers-Murphy (NZL); L 0–2	2nd place, silver medalist(s)
Joshna Chinappa; Harinder Pal Sandhu	Mixed doubles	Laing / Kelly (CAY); W 2–0	Aitken / Moran (SCO); W 2–0	—N/a	1 Q	Landers-Murphy / Millar (NZL); W 2–1	King / Coll (NZL); L 0–2	Did not advance		
Dipika Pallikal Karthik; Saurav Ghosal	Mixed doubles	Fung-A-Fat / Khalil (GUY); W 2–0	M Zafar / Aslam (PAK); W 2–0	—N/a	1 Q	Azman / Singh (MAS); W 2–1	Evans / Creed (WAL); W 2–0	King / Coll (NZL); W 2–1	Urquhart / Pilley (AUS); L 0–2	2nd place, silver medalist(s)

== Swimming ==
Men

Athlete	Event	Heat		Semifinal		Final	
Athlete	Event	Time	Rank	Time	Rank	Time	Rank
Virdhawal Khade	50 m freestyle	23.11	19	Did not advance			
Virdhawal Khade	50 m butterfly	24.52	13 Q	24.50	15	Did not advance	
Sajan Prakash	50 m butterfly	25.11	21	Did not advance			
Sajan Prakash	100 m butterfly	54.11	9 Q	54.12	11	Did not advance	
Sajan Prakash	200 m butterfly	1:58.87	8 Q	—N/a		1:59.05	8
Sajan Prakash	1500 m freestyle	—N/a				15:52.84	7
Srihari Nataraj	50 m backstroke	26.47	9 Q	26.50	9	Did not advance	
Srihari Nataraj	100 m backstroke	56.71	15 Q	56.65	13	Did not advance	
Srihari Nataraj	200 m backstroke	2:04.75	17	—N/a		Did not advance	

Women

Athlete	Event	Heat		Final	
Athlete	Event	Time	Rank	Time	Rank
Vaishnavi Jagtap	50 m freestyle S8	41.63	6 Q	42.03	6
Kiran Tak	100 m freestyle S9	1:46.29	7 Q	1:47.95	7

== Table tennis ==
India was represented by 10 athletes, 5 men and 5 women. Sharath Kamal, Sathiyan Gnanasekaran, Sanil Shetty, Harmeet Desai and Anthony Amalraj made up the men's Table Tennis squad. The women's squad comprised Manika Batra, Mouma Das, Sutirtha Mukherjee, Madhurika Patkar and Pooja Sahasrabudhe.

Singles

Athletes	Event	Group stage			Round of 64	Round of 32	Round of 16	Quarterfinal	Semifinal	Final/BM	Rank
Athletes	Event	Opposition Score	Opposition Score	Rank	Opposition Score	Opposition Score	Opposition Score	Opposition Score	Opposition Score	Opposition Score	Rank
Sharath Kamal	Men's singles	Bye				Choong (MAS); W 4–3	Hu Hm (AUS); W 4–1	Pitchford (ENG); W 4–2	Aruna (NGR); L 0–4	Walker (ENG); W 4–1	3rd place, bronze medalist(s)
Harmeet Desai	Men's singles	Bye				Loi (PNG); W 4–0	Leong C F (MAS); W 4–1	Aruna (NGR); L 0–4	Did not advance		
Sathiyan Gnanasekaran	Men's singles	Bye				Rameez (PAK); W 4–0	Toriola (NGR); W 4–0 (ret.)	Walker (ENG); L 0–4	Did not advance		
Manika Batra	Women's singles	Bye			—N/a	Bye	Feng (AUS); W 4–1	Zhou Yh (SGP); W 4–1	Feng Tw (SGP); W 4–3	Yu My (SGP); W 4–0	1st place, gold medalist(s)
Mouma Das	Women's singles	Bye			—N/a	Kau (MRI); W 4–0	Ho (ENG); W 4–3	Yu My (SGP); L 1–4	Did not advance		
Madhurika Patkar	Women's singles	Bye			—N/a	Chung (TTO); W 4–1	Sibley (ENG); L 2–4	Did not advance			

Doubles

Athletes	Event	Round of 64	Round of 32	Round of 16	Quarterfinal	Semifinal	Final/BM	Rank
Athletes	Event	Opposition Score	Opposition Score	Opposition Score	Opposition Score	Opposition Score	Opposition Score	Rank
Sharath Kamal; Sathiyan Gnanasekaran	Men's doubles	—N/a	Miita / Takooa (KIR); W 3–0	Mudiyanselage / Ranasingha (SRI); W 3–0	McBeath / Walker (ENG); W 3–0	Yew P / Shao P (SGP); W 3–1	Drinkhall / Pitchford (ENG); L 2–3	2nd place, silver medalist(s)
Harmeet Desai; Sanil Shetty	Men's doubles	—N/a	Britton / Franklin (GUY); W 3–0	McCreery / Robinson (NIR); W 3–0	Hu Hm / Yan (AUS); W 3–1	Drinkhall / Pitchford (ENG); L 0–3	Yew P / Shao P (SGP); W 3–0	3rd place, bronze medalist(s)
Manika Batra; Mouma Das	Women's doubles	—N/a	Bye	Kapugeekiyana / Madurangi (SRI); W 3–0	Ho / Tsaptsinos (ENG); W 3–1	Ho Y / Lyne (MAS); W 3–0	Feng Tw / Yu My (SGP); L 0–3	2nd place, silver medalist(s)
Sutirtha Mukherjee; Pooja Sahasrabudhe	Women's doubles	—N/a	Kinoo / Ramasawmy (MRI); W 3–0	Carey / Thomas (WAL); W 3–1	Cote / Zhang M (CAN); W 3–0	Feng Tw / Yu My (SGP); L 0–3	Ho Y / Lyne (MAS); L 1–3	4
Pooja Sahasrabudhe; Harmeet Desai	Mixed doubles	Bye	Choong / Lyne (MAS); L 1–3	Did not advance				
Manika Batra; Sathiyan Gnanasekaran	Mixed doubles	Bye	Ho Y / Leong C F (MAS); W 3–0	Cote / Medjugorac (CAN); W 3–2	Xue J P / Zhou Yh (SGP); W 3–0	Pitchford / Ho (ENG); L 2–3	Kamal / Das (IND); W 3–0	3rd place, bronze medalist(s)
Mouma Das; Sharath Kamal	Mixed doubles	Bye	Sirisena / Madurangi (SRI); W 3–1	McBeath / Sibley (ENG); W 3–0	Wang / Zhang M (CAN); W 3–1	Gao N / Yu My (SGP); L 2–3	Gnanasekaran / Batra (IND); L 0–3	4
Madhurika Patkar; Sanil Shetty	Mixed doubles	Bye	Mudiyanselage / Warusawithana (SRI); W 3–0	Kau / Taucoory (MRI); W 3–0	Pitchford / Ho (ENG); L 2–3	Did not advance		

Team

Athletes	Event	Group stage			Round of 16	Quarterfinal	Semifinal	Final	Rank
Athletes	Event	Opposition Score	Opposition Score	Rank	Opposition Score	Opposition Score	Opposition Score	Opposition Score	Rank
Sharath Kamal; Anthony Amalraj; Harmeet Desai; Sanil Shetty; Sathiyan Gnanasekaran	Men's team	Trinidad and Tobago; W 3–0	Northern Ireland; W 3–0	1 Q	Bye	Malaysia; W 3–0	Singapore; W 3–2	Nigeria; W 3–0	1st place, gold medalist(s)
Manika Batra; Mouma Das; Sutirtha Mukherjee; Madhurika Patkar; Pooja Sahasrabudhe	Women's team	Sri Lanka; W 3–0	Wales; W 3–1	1 Q	—N/a	Malaysia; W 3–0	England; W 3–0	Singapore; W 3–1	1st place, gold medalist(s)

Para-sport

Athletes	Event	Group stage				Semifinal	Final	Rank
Athletes	Event	Opposition Score	Opposition Score	Opposition Score	Rank	Opposition Score	Opposition Score	Rank
Maitreyee Sarkar	Women's TT6–10	Tapper (AUS); L 0–3	Nime (PNG); W 3–0	Pickard (ENG); L 0–3	3	Did not advance		
Vaishnavi Sutar	Women's TT6–10	Chan (CAN); L 0–3	Obazuaye (NGR); L 0–3	McDonnell (AUS); L 0–3	4	Did not advance		

== Weightlifting ==
Men

Athlete	Event	Weight lifted		Total	Rank
Athlete	Event	Snatch	Clean & jerk	Total	Rank
Gururaja Poojary	56 kg	111	138	249	2nd place, silver medalist(s)
Raja Muthupandi	62kg	116	150	266	6
Deepak Lather	69 kg	136	159	295	3rd place, bronze medalist(s)
Sathish Sivalingam	77 kg	144	173	317	1st place, gold medalist(s)
Ragala Venkat Rahul	85 kg	151	187	338	1st place, gold medalist(s)
Vikas Thakur	94 kg	159	192	351	3rd place, bronze medalist(s)
Pardeep Singh	105 kg	152	200	352	2nd place, silver medalist(s)
Gurdeep Singh	+105 kg	175	207	382	4

Women

Athlete	Event	Weight lifted		Total	Rank
Athlete	Event	Snatch	Clean & jerk	Total	Rank
Saikhom Mirabai Chanu	48 kg	86 CR/GR	110 CR/GR	196 CR/GR	1st place, gold medalist(s)
Khumukcham Sanjita Chanu	53 kg	84 GR	108	192	1st place, gold medalist(s)
Saraswati Rout	58 kg	DNF	—	—	—
Vandna Gupta	63 kg	80	100	180	5
Punam Yadav	69 kg	100	122	222	1st place, gold medalist(s)
Seema	75 kg	84	105	189	6
Lalchhanhimi	90 kg	85	109	194	8
Purnima Pandey	+90 kg	94	118	212	6

== Wrestling ==
India participated with 12 athletes (6 men and 6 women).

Key:

- VT – Victory by Fall.
- PP – Decision by Points – the loser with technical points.
- PO – Decision by Points – the loser without technical points.
- ST – Technical superiority – the loser without technical points and a margin of victory of at least 10 points.
- SP – Technical superiority – the loser with technical points and a margin of victory of at least 10 points.
- VB – Victory by Injury

Repechage Format

Athlete	Event	Round of 16	Quarterfinal	Semifinal	Repechage	Final/BM	
Athlete	Event	Opposition Result	Opposition Result	Opposition Result	Opposition Result	Opposition Result	Rank
Rahul Aware	Men's 57 kg	Ramm (ENG); W 11–0ST	Cicchini (AUS); W 10–0ST	Bilal (PAK); W 12–8^{PP}	—N/a	Takahashi (CAN); W 15–7^{PP}	1st place, gold medalist(s)
Bajrang Punia	Men's 65 kg	Richards (NZL); W 10–0ST	Daniel (NGR); W 10–0ST	Marinis (CAN); W 10–0ST	—N/a	Charig (WAL); W 10–0ST	1st place, gold medalist(s)
Sushil Kumar	Men's 74 kg	Balfour (CAN); W 11–0ST	Butt (PAK); W 10–0ST	Evans (AUS); W 4–0^{VT}	—N/a	Botha (RSA); W 10–0ST	1st place, gold medalist(s)
Somveer Kadian	Men's 86 kg	Kookoo (KIR); W 4–0^{VT}	Inam (PAK); L 0–10ST	Did not advance	Lawrence (AUS); W 7–0^{VT}	Moore (CAN); W 7–3^{PP}	3rd place, bronze medalist(s)
Mausam Khatri	Men's 97 kg	Bye	Kaouslidis (CYP); W 12–0ST	Tamarau (NGR); W 10–7^{PP}	—N/a	Erasmus (RSA); L 2–12^{SP}	2nd place, silver medalist(s)
Kiran Bishnoi	Women's 76 kg	—N/a	Guemde (CMR); W 11–1^{SP}	Onyebuchi (NGR); L 0–10ST	—N/a	Pariadhaven (MRI); W 10–0^{VT}	3rd place, bronze medalist(s)

Group stage Format

Athlete	Event	Group stage			Semifinal	Final / BM	
Athlete	Event	Opposition Result	Opposition Result	Rank	Opposition Result	Opposition Result	Rank
Pooja Dhanda	Women's 57 kg	Schaefer (CAN); W 12–5^{PP}	Moceyawa (NZL); W 8–0^{VT}	1 Q	Essombe (CMR); W 11–5^{PP}	Adekuoroye (NGR); L 5–7^{PP}	2nd place, silver medalist(s)
Divya Kakran	Women's 68 kg	Anzong (CMR); W 10–8^{VT}	Lappage (CAN); L 2–12^{SP}	2 Q	Oborududu (NGR); L 1–11^{SP}	Sultana (BAN); W 4–0^{VT}	3rd place, bronze medalist(s)

Nordic Format

Athlete	Event	Nordic Round Robin				Rank
Athlete	Event	Opposition Result	Opposition Result	Opposition Result	Opposition Result	Rank
Sumit Malik	Men's 125 kg	Mbianga (CMR); W ^{VB}	Jarvis (CAN); W 6–4^{PP}	Raza (PAK); W 10–4^{PP}	Boltic (NGR); W ^{VB}	1st place, gold medalist(s)
Vinesh Phogat	Women's 50 kg	Genesis (NGR); W 6–5^{PP}	Kaur (AUS); W 10–0ST	MacDonald (CAN); W 13–3^{SP}	—N/a	1st place, gold medalist(s)
Babita Kumari	Women's 53 kg	Samuel (NGR); W 2–1^{PP}	Dilhani (SRI); W 4–0^{VT}	Holland (AUS); W 4–0^{VT}	Weicker (CAN); L 0–5^{PP}	2nd place, silver medalist(s)
Sakshi Malik	Women's 62 kg	Ngolle (CMR); W 10–0ST	Fazzari (CAN); L 8–11^{PP}	Adeniyi (NGR); L 3–6^{PP}	Ford (NZL); W 6–5^{PP}	3rd place, bronze medalist(s)
