= Shooting at the 2018 Commonwealth Games – Women's 50 metre rifle three positions =

Women's 50 metre rifle three positions at the 2018 Commonwealth Games
- Venue: Belmont Shooting Centre, Brisbane
- Dates: 13 April 2018
- Competitors: 16 from 10 nations

Medalists
| gold medal | Tejaswini Sawant | India |
| silver medal | Anjum Moudgil | India |
| bronze medal | Seonaid McIntosh | Scotland |

The Women's 25 metre air pistol took place on 13 April 2018 at the Belmont Shooting Centre, Brisbane. There was a qualification in which the top 8 athletes qualified for the finals.

== Results ==
=== Qualification ===
| Rank | Athlete | Country | Kneeling | | | Prone | | | Kneeling & Prone | Standing | | | Total |
| Rank | Athlete | Country | 1 | 2 | Result | 1 | 2 | Result | Kneeling & Prone | 1 | 2 | Result | Total |
|---|---|---|---|---|---|---|---|---|---|---|---|---|---|
| 1 | Anjum Moudgil | India | 98 | 98 | 196 | 100 | 99 | 199 | 295 | 96 | 98 | 194 | 589-32x Q/GR |
| 2 | Martina Lindsay Veloso | Singapore | 97 | 96 | 194 | 100 | 99 | 199 | 293 | 97 | 95 | 192 | 584-32x Q |
| 3 | Tejaswini Sawant | India | 97 | 97 | 194 | 98 | 98 | 196 | 290 | 96 | 96 | 192 | 582-31x Q |
| 4 | Jennifer McIntosh | Scotland | 95 | 96 | 191 | 99 | 97 | 196 | 287 | 96 | 95 | 191 | 578-23x Q |
| 5 | Robyn Ridley | Australia | 98 | 96 | 194 | 99 | 98 | 197 | 291 | 95 | 91 | 186 | 577-24x Q |
| 6 | Seonaid McIntosh | Scotland | 95 | 97 | 192 | 99 | 98 | 197 | 289 | 93 | 94 | 187 | 576-21x Q |
| 7 | Xiang Wei Jasmine Ser | Singapore | 98 | 95 | 193 | 95 | 96 | 191 | 284 | 95 | 96 | 191 | 575-22x Q |
| 8 | Katie Gleeson | England | 97 | 94 | 191 | 98 | 98 | 196 | 287 | 91 | 95 | 186 | 573-17x Q |
| 9 | Sian Corish | Wales | 96 | 96 | 192 | 97 | 96 | 193 | 285 | 93 | 94 | 187 | 572-20x |
| 10 | Nur Suryani Mohamed Taibi | Malaysia | 97 | 96 | 193 | 96 | 99 | 195 | 288 | 92 | 91 | 183 | 571-13x |
| 11 | Rachel Glover | Isle of Man | 96 | 97 | 193 | 97 | 99 | 196 | 289 | 89 | 92 | 181 | 570-21x |
| 12 | Sarmin Shilpa | Bangladesh | 95 | 98 | 193 | 95 | 98 | 193 | 286 | 90 | 94 | 184 | 570-19x |
| 13 | Suraiya Akter | Bangladesh | 90 | 95 | 185 | 98 | 97 | 195 | 280 | 96 | 94 | 190 | 570-16x |
| 14 | Emma Adams | Australia | 96 | 94 | 190 | 97 | 95 | 192 | 282 | 93 | 91 | 184 | 566-18x |
| 15 | Gemma Kermode | Isle of Man | 95 | 97 | 192 | 98 | 95 | 193 | 285 | 90 | 84 | 174 | 559-17x |
| 16 | Mercy Chodo | Ghana | 92 | 89 | 181 | 98 | 96 | 194 | 275 | 85 | 93 | 178 | 553-14x |

=== Finals ===
| Rank | Athlete | Country | Kneeling | | | | | Prone | | | | | Kneeling & Prone | Standing Elimination | | | | | | | | | | | | | | | | | | Total |
| Rank | Athlete | Country | 1 | 2 | 1-2 | 3 | Result | 1 | 2 | 1-2 | 3 | Result | Kneeling & Prone | 1 | 2 | 1-2 | Total | 3 | 1-3 | Total | 4 | 1-4 | Total | 5 | 1-5 | Total | 6 | 1-6 | Total | 7 | Result | Total |
|---|---|---|---|---|---|---|---|---|---|---|---|---|---|---|---|---|---|---|---|---|---|---|---|---|---|---|---|---|---|---|---|---|
| 1st place, gold medalist(s) | Tejaswini Sawant | India | 50.8 | 51.3 | 102.1 | 50.3 | 152.4 | 51.9 | 52.7 | 104.6 | 53.1 | 157.7 | 310.1 | 50.6 | 46.6 | 97.2 | 407.3 | 10.1 | 107.3 | 417.4 | 10.0 | 117.3 | 427.4 | 10.0 | 127.3 | 437.4 | 10.0 | 137.3 | 447.4 | 10.5 | 147.8 | 457.9 GR |
| 2nd place, silver medalist(s) | Anjum Moudgil | India | 50.7 | 50.4 | 101.1 | 50.8 | 151.9 | 52.3 | 51.8 | 104.1 | 52.0 | 156.1 | 308.0 | 49.9 | 48.2 | 98.1 | 406.1 | 10.2 | 108.3 | 416.3 | 9.7 | 118.0 | 426.0 | 10.2 | 128.2 | 436.2 | 10.4 | 138.6 | 446.6 | 9.1 | 147.7 | 455.7 |
| 3rd place, bronze medalist(s) | Seonaid McIntosh | Scotland | 50.4 | 49.3 | 99.7 | 50.5 | 150.2 | 50.7 | 51.8 | 102.5 | 52.0 | 154.5 | 304.7 | 50.3 | 50.4 | 100.7 | 405.4 | 9.6 | 110.3 | 415.0 | 9.7 | 120.0 | 424.7 | 9.4 | 129.4 | 434.1 | 10.5 | 139.9 | 444.6 | - | 139.9 | 444.6 |
| 4 | Martina Lindsay Veloso | Singapore | 50.6 | 52.0 | 102.6 | 48.3 | 150.9 | 51.7 | 51.0 | 102.7 | 50.9 | 153.6 | 304.5 | 48.1 | 49.5 | 97.6 | 402.1 | 9.9 | 107.5 | 412.0 | 10.6 | 118.1 | 422.6 | 9.7 | 127.8 | 432.3 | - | - | - | - | 127.8 | 432.3 |
| 5 | Katie Gleeson | England | 48.9 | 51.2 | 100.1 | 51.7 | 151.8 | 48.4 | 51.4 | 99.8 | 51.7 | 151.5 | 303.3 | 47.0 | 50.4 | 97.4 | 400.7 | 9.5 | 106.9 | 410.2 | 10.0 | 116.9 | 420.2 | - | - | - | - | - | - | - | 116.9 | 420.2 |
| 6 | Xiang Wei Jasmine Ser | Singapore | 49.5 | 51.9 | 101.4 | 51.6 | 153.0 | 51.9 | 51.7 | 103.6 | 52.5 | 156.1 | 309.1 | 45.5 | 46.6 | 92.1 | 401.2 | 7.6 | 99.7 | 408.8 | - | - | - | - | - | - | - | - | - | - | 99.7 | 408.8 |
| 7 | Robyn Ridley | Australia | 48.3 | 50.6 | 98.6 | 51.3 | 150.2 | 49.8 | 50.9 | 100.7 | 51.3 | 152.0 | 302.2 | 47.6 | 49.1 | 96.7 | 398.9 | - | - | - | - | - | - | - | - | - | - | - | - | - | 96.7 | 398.9 |
| 8 | Jennifer McIntosh | Scotland | 50.9 | 48.2 | 99.1 | 49.5 | 147.6 | 51.4 | 52.6 | 104.0 | 52.5 | 156.5 | 304.1 | 47.2 | 46.9 | 94.1 | 398.2 | - | - | - | - | - | - | - | - | - | - | - | - | - | 94.1 | 398.2 |
