= Isle of Man at the 2018 Commonwealth Games =

- Flag of the Isle of Man
- CGF code: IOM
- CGA: Commonwealth Games Association of the Isle of Man
- Website: cga.im

in Gold Coast, Australia 4 April 2018 – 15 April 2018
- Competitors: 31 in 8 sports
- Flag bearer: Jake Kelly (opening)
- Medals Ranked 34th: Gold 0 Silver 1 Bronze 0 Total 1

Commonwealth Games appearances (overview)
- 1958; 1962; 1966; 1970; 1974; 1978; 1982; 1986; 1990; 1994; 1998; 2002; 2006; 2010; 2014; 2018; 2022; 2026; 2030

Isle of Man competed at the 2018 Commonwealth Games in the Gold Coast, Australia from April 4 to April 15, 2018. Isle of Man announced it would send a squad of 32 athletes. However, Mark Cavendish did not compete.

Cyclist Jake Kelly was the country's flag bearer during the opening ceremony.

== Medalists ==
Medal	Name	Sport	Event	Date
Silver	Tim Kneale	Shooting	Men's Double trap	11 April 2018

== Competitors ==
The following is the list of number of competitors participating at the Games per sport/discipline.

Sport	Men	Women	Total
Athletics	2	1	3
Badminton	1	3	4
Cycling	7	2	9
Gymnastics	0	1	1
Lawn bowls	2	0	2
Shooting	4	2	6
Swimming	1	4	5
Triathlon	0	1	1
Total	17	14	31

== Athletics ==
Isle of Man announced a team of 3 athletes (2 men, 1 woman) would compete at the 2018 Commonwealth Games.

Track & road events

Athlete	Event	Heat		Final	
Athlete	Event	Result	Rank	Result	Rank
Joseph Reid	Men's 800 m	1:50.03	6	Did not advance	
Erika Kelly	Women's 20 km walk	—N/a		1:47:29	9

Field events

Athlete	Event	Qualification		Final	
Athlete	Event	Distance	Rank	Distance	Rank
Joe Harris	Men's Javelin throw	70.61	16	Did not advance	

== Badminton ==
Isle of Man announced a team of 4 athletes (1 man, 3 women) would compete at the 2018 Commonwealth Games.

Singles

Athlete	Event	Round of 64	Round of 32	Round of 16	Quarterfinal	Semifinal	Final / BM	
Athlete	Event	Opposition Score	Opposition Score	Opposition Score	Opposition Score	Opposition Score	Opposition Score	Rank
Benjamin Li	Men's singles	Chongo Mulenga (ZAM); W 2–0	Lee Chong Wei (MAS); L 0–2	Did not advance				
Kimberley Clague	Women's singles	Everlyn Siamupangila (ZAM); W 2–0	Michelle Li (CAN); L 0–2	Did not advance				
Jessica Li	Women's singles	bye	Ogar Siamupangila (ZAM); W 2–0	Saina Nehwal (IND); L RET	Did not advance			
Cristen Marritt	Women's singles	bye	Mahoor Shahzad (PAK); L 0–2	Did not advance				

Doubles

Athlete	Event	Round of 64	Round of 32	Round of 16	Quarterfinal	Semifinal	Final / BM	
Athlete	Event	Opposition Score	Opposition Score	Opposition Score	Opposition Score	Opposition Score	Opposition Score	Rank
Kimberley Clague; Cristen Marritt	Women's doubles	—N/a	Hasini Ambalangodage (SRI); Madushika Dilrukshi Beruwelage (SRI); L 0–2	Did not advance				
Jessica Li; Benjamin Li	Mixed doubles	bye	Emmanuel Donkor (GHA); Stella Koteikai Amasah (GHA); L 0–2	Did not advance				

== Cycling ==
Isle of Man announced a team of 10 athletes (8 men, 2 women) would compete at the 2018 Commonwealth Games. However, Mark Cavendish withdrew from the team due to an injury.

=== Road ===
Men

Athlete	Event	Time	Rank
Samuel Brand	Road race	DNF	
Matthew Bostock	Road race	DNF	
Nathan Draper	Road race	DNF	
Jake Kelly	Road race	3:59:35	32
Leon Mazzone	Road race	3:59:35	34
Thomas Mazzone	Road race	4:08:16	50
Samuel Brand	Time trial	53:45.77	22
Nathan Draper	Time trial	56:07.68	33
Jake Kelly	Time trial	53:23.94	21

Women

Athlete	Event	Time	Rank
Anna Christian	Road race	3:08:16	28
Anna Christian	Time trial	39:28.87	9
Elizabeth Holden	Road race	3:03:32	18
Elizabeth Holden	Time trial	40:07.94	10

=== Track ===
Pursuit

Athlete	Event	Qualification		Final	
Athlete	Event	Time	Rank	Opponent Results	Rank
Matthew Draper	Men's pursuit	4:38.602	22	Did not advance	

Points race

Athlete	Event	Qualification		Final	
Athlete	Event	Points	Rank	Points	Rank
Matthew Bostock	Men's point race	7	9 Q	3	14
Matthew Draper	Men's point race	0	14	Did not advance	

Scratch race

Athlete	Event	Qualification	Final
Matthew Bostock	Men's scratch race	7 Q	6
Matthew Draper	Men's scratch race	12 Q	DNF

=== Mountain bike ===
Athlete	Event	Time	Rank
Nicholas Corlett	Men's cross-country	1:26:20	10

== Gymnastics ==
Isle of Man announced a team of 1 athlete (1 woman) would compete at the 2018 Commonwealth Games.

=== Artistic ===
Women
Individual Qualification

Athlete	Event	Apparatus				Total	Rank
Athlete	Event	V	UB	BB	F	Total	Rank
Nicole Burns	Qualification	12.250	10.600	11.900	10.375	45.125	19 Q

Individual Finals

Athlete	Event	Apparatus				Total	Rank
Athlete	Event	V	UB	BB	F	Total	Rank
Nicole Burns	All-around	10.250	10.900	11.650	11.500	44.300	15

== Lawn bowls ==
Isle of Man announced a team of 2 athletes (2 men) would compete at the 2018 Commonwealth Games.

Men

Athlete	Event	Group stage						Quarterfinal	Semifinal	Final / BM	
Athlete	Event	Opposition Score	Opposition Score	Opposition Score	Opposition Score	Opposition Score	Rank	Opposition Score	Opposition Score	Opposition Score	Rank
Kenneth McGreal	Singles	Bester (CAN); L 8 – 21	Bazo (PNG); L 18 – 21	de Sousa (JER); L 8 – 21	Kelly (NIR); L 7 – 21	Gaborutwe (BOT); W 21 - 13	5	Did not advance			
Kenneth McGreal; Mark McGreal	Pairs	Wales; L 11 - 22	Jamaica; W 21 - 10	Northern Ireland; L 6 - 20	South Africa; L 13 - 19	—N/a	4	Did not advance			

== Shooting ==
Isle of Man announced a team of 6 athletes (4 men, 2 women) would compete at the 2018 Commonwealth Games.

Men

Athlete	Event	Qualification		Final	
Athlete	Event	Points	Rank	Points	Rank
Neil Parsons	Trap	103	28	Did not advance	
David Walton	Trap	109	20	Did not advance	
Jake Keeling	Double trap	111	17	Did not advance	
Tim Kneale	Double trap	135	3 Q	70	2nd place, silver medalist(s)

Women

Athlete	Event	Qualification		Final	
Athlete	Event	Points	Rank	Points	Rank
Rachel Glover	50 metre rifle 3 positions	570	11	Did not advance	
Rachel Glover	50 metre rifle prone	—N/a		615.4	6
Gemma Kermode	50 metre rifle 3 positions	559	15	Did not advance	
Gemma Kermode	50 metre rifle prone	—N/a		589.0	19

== Swimming ==
Isle of Man announced a team of 5 athletes (1 man, 4 women) would compete at the 2018 Commonwealth Games.

Men

Athlete	Event	Heat		Semifinal		Final	
Athlete	Event	Time	Rank	Time	Rank	Time	Rank
Guy Davies	50 m breaststroke	29.82	18	Did not advance			
Guy Davies	100 m breaststroke	1:04.88	14 Q	1:04.91	14	Did not advance	

Women

Athlete	Event	Heat		Semifinal		Final	
Athlete	Event	Time	Rank	Time	Rank	Time	Rank
Stephanie Brew	50 m breaststroke	33.71	21	Did not advance			
Laura Kinley	50 m breaststroke	31.99	12 Q	32.15	14	Did not advance	
Niamh Robinson	50 m breaststroke	32.77	19	Did not advance			
Stephanie Brew	100 m breaststroke	1:15.06	23	Did not advance			
Laura Kinley	100 m breaststroke	1:09.71	13 Q	1:10.93	16	Did not advance	
Niamh Robinson	100 m breaststroke	1:11.10	18	Did not advance			
Niamh Robinson	200 m breaststroke	2:32.94	15	—N/a		Did not advance	
Charlotte Atkinson	50 m butterfly	27.72	14 Q	27.57	14	Did not advance	
Charlotte Atkinson	100 m butterfly	58.97	7 Q	58.04	4 Q	57.88	5
Charlotte Atkinson	200 m butterfly	2:09.95	6 Q	—N/a		2:08.50	4
Niamh Robinson	200 m individual medley	2:19.62	12	—N/a		Did not advance	
Niamh Robinson; Laura Kinley; Charlotte Atkinson; Stephanie Brew	4 × 100 m medley relay	—N/a				4:20.25	8

== Triathlon ==
Isle of Man announced a team of 1 athlete (1 woman) would compete at the 2018 Commonwealth Games.

Individual

Athlete	Event	Swim (750 m)	Trans 1	Bike (20 km)	Trans 2	Run (5 km)	Total	Rank
Jennifer Newbery	Women's	11:08	0:42	33:28	0:27	21:33	1:07:18	19
