= Shooting at the 2018 Commonwealth Games =

- Venue: Belmont Shooting Centre
- Location: Brisbane, Australia
- Dates: 8 to 14 April 2018
- Competitors: 282 from 38 nations

Shooting at the 2018 Commonwealth Games was the 13th appearance of Shooting at the Commonwealth Games. The Shooting competitions were held from 8 to 14 April at the Belmont Shooting Centre in Brisbane.

== Medal table ==
* Host nation (Australia)

Rank	Nation	Gold	Silver	Bronze	Total
1	India	7	4	5	16
2	Australia*	3	5	1	9
3	England	2	2	4	8
4	Wales	2	2	1	5
5	Cyprus	2	0	1	3
6	Singapore	2	0	0	2
7	Scotland	1	1	4	6
8	Bangladesh	0	2	0	2
9	Northern Ireland	0	1	1	2
10	Canada	0	1	0	1
10	Isle of Man	0	1	0	1
12	Malaysia	0	0	1	1
12	Malta	0	0	1	1
Totals (13 entries)		19	19	19	57

== Medalists ==
=== Men ===
Event	Gold	Silver	Bronze
10 metre air pistol	Jitu Rai; India	Kerry Bell; Australia	Om Prakash Mitharwal; India
25 metre rapid fire pistol	Anish Bhanwala; India	Sergei Evglevski; Australia	Sam Gowin; England
50 metre pistol	Daniel Repacholi; Australia	Shakil Ahmed; Bangladesh	Om Prakash Mitharwal; India
10 metre air rifle	Dane Sampson; Australia	Abdullah Hel Baki; Bangladesh	Ravi Kumar; India
50 metre rifle prone	David Phelps; Wales	Neil Stirton; Scotland	Kenny Parr; England
50 metre rifle three positions	Sanjeev Rajput; India	Grzegorz Sych; Canada	Dean Bale; England
Skeet	Georgios Achilleos; Cyprus	Ben Llewellin; Wales	Gareth McAuley; Northern Ireland
Trap	Michael Wixey; Wales	Aaron Heading; England	Brian Galea; Malta
Double trap	David McMath; Scotland	Tim Kneale; Isle of Man	Ankur Mittal; India

=== Women ===
Event	Gold	Silver	Bronze
10 metre air pistol	Manu Bhaker; India	Heena Sidhu; India	Elena Galiabovitch; Australia
25 metre pistol	Heena Sidhu; India	Elena Galiabovitch; Australia	Alia Sazana Azahari; Malaysia
10 metre air rifle	Martina Veloso; Singapore	Mehuli Ghosh; India	Apurvi Chandela; India
50 metre rifle prone	Martina Veloso; Singapore	Tejaswini Sawant; India	Seonaid McIntosh; Scotland
50 metre rifle three positions	Tejaswini Sawant; India	Anjum Moudgil; India	Seonaid McIntosh; Scotland
Skeet	Andri Eleftheriou; Cyprus	Amber Hill; England	Panayiota Andreou; Cyprus
Trap	Laetisha Scanlan; Australia	Kirsty Barr; Northern Ireland	Sarah Wixey; Wales
Double trap	Shreyasi Singh; India	Emma Cox; Australia	Linda Pearson; Scotland

=== Open ===
Event	Gold	Silver	Bronze
Queen's Prize individual	David Luckman; England	Jim Bailey; Australia	Parag Patel; England
Queen's Prize pairs	England; Parag Patel; David Luckman	Wales; Chris Watson; Gareth Morris	Scotland; Alexander Walker; Ian Shaw

== Participating nations ==
There are 38 participating associations in shooting with a total of 282 athletes.

- Antigua and Barbuda (2 athletes)
- Australia (28)
- Bangladesh (12)
- Barbados (8)
- Canada (4)
- Cayman Islands (1)
- Cyprus (10)
- England (21)
- Falkland Islands (10)
- Fiji (4)
- Ghana (2)
- Gibraltar (6)
- Guernsey (6)
- Guyana (2)
- India (27)
- Isle of Man (6)
- Jamaica (2)
- Jersey (6)
- Kenya (5)
- Malaysia (9)
- Malta (5)
- New Zealand (11)
- Niue (6)
- Norfolk Island (8)
- Northern Ireland (8)
- Pakistan (7)
- Papua New Guinea (3)
- Saint Helena (2)
- Samoa (4)
- Scotland (13)
- Singapore (17)
- Sri Lanka (3)
- South Africa (4)
- Tonga (1)
- Trinidad and Tobago (5)
- Turks and Caicos Islands (2)
- Uganda (1)
- Wales (11)
