= Swimming at the 2018 Commonwealth Games – Women's 50 metre breaststroke =

Women's 50 metre breaststroke at the 2018 Commonwealth Games
- Venue: Gold Coast Aquatic Centre
- Dates: 5 April (heats, semifinals); 6 April (final)
- Competitors: 24 from 14 nations
- Winning time: 30.60

Medalists
gold medal	Sarah Vasey	England
silver medal	Alia Atkinson	Jamaica
bronze medal	Leiston Pickett	Australia

The women's 50 metre breaststroke event at the 2018 Commonwealth Games was held on 5 and 6 April at the Gold Coast Aquatic Centre.

== Records ==
Prior to this competition, the existing world, Commonwealth and Games records were as follows:

World record	Lilly King (USA)	29.40	Budapest, Hungary	30 July 2017
Commonwealth record	Alia Atkinson (JAM)	30.11	Kazan, Russia	9 August 2015
Games record	Alia Atkinson (JAM)	30.17	Glasgow, United Kingdom	24 July 2014

== Schedule ==
The schedule is as follows:

All times are Australian Eastern Standard Time (UTC+10)

Date	Time	Round
Thursday 5 April 2018	11:38	Qualifying
Thursday 5 April 2018	21:02	Semifinals
Friday 6 April 2018	19:41	Final

== Results ==
=== Heats ===
Rank	Heat	Lane	Name	Nationality	Time	Notes
1	3	4	Sarah Vasey	England	30.77	Q
2	2	5	Leiston Pickett	Australia	30.87	Q
3	2	6	Tatjana Schoenmaker	South Africa	30.92	Q
4	3	5	Jessica Hansen	Australia	30.93	Q
5	1	4	Alia Atkinson	Jamaica	30.98	Q
6	3	3	Georgia Bohl	Australia	31.00	Q
7	1	5	Faith Knelson	Canada	31.19	Q
8	1	6	Chloé Tutton	Wales	31.24	Q
9	2	3	Corrie Scott	Scotland	31.48	Q
10	2	4	Rachel Nicol	Canada	31.54	Q
11	1	3	Roanne Ho	Singapore	31.61	Q
12	1	2	Laura Kinley	Isle of Man	31.99	Q
13	3	6	Jocelyn Ulyett	England	32.14	Q
14	1	7	Tilka Paljk	Zambia	32.16	Q
15	3	7	Bronagh Ryan	New Zealand	32.18	Q
16	2	2	Molly Renshaw	England	32.22	Q
17	3	2	Kaylene Corbett	South Africa	32.51	
18	1	1	Emily Visagie	South Africa	32.73	
19	3	1	Niamh Robinson	Isle of Man	32.77	
20	2	7	Beth Sloan	Wales	32.91	
21	2	1	Stephanie Brew	Isle of Man	33.71	
22	3	8	Kirsten Fisher-Marsters	Cook Islands	33.84	
23	2	8	Oreoluwa Cherebin	Grenada	34.86	
24	1	8	Bunturabie Jalloh	Sierra Leone	48.81	

=== Semifinals ===
Rank	Heat	Lane	Name	Nationality	Time	Notes
1	2	3	Alia Atkinson	Jamaica	30.53	Q
2	2	4	Sarah Vasey	England	30.75	Q
3	1	3	Georgia Bohl	Australia	30.92	Q
3	1	5	Jessica Hansen	Australia	30.92	Q
5	2	5	Tatjana Schoenmaker	South Africa	31.01	Q
6	1	4	Leiston Pickett	Australia	31.02	Q
7	2	6	Faith Knelson	Canada	31.22	Q
8	2	7	Roanne Ho	Singapore	31.31	Q
9	2	2	Corrie Scott	Scotland	31.33	
10	1	6	Chloé Tutton	Wales	31.43	
11	1	2	Rachel Nicol	Canada	31.87	
12	2	1	Jocelyn Ulyett	England	31.96	
13	1	1	Tilka Paljk	Zambia	32.05	
14	1	7	Laura Kinley	Isle of Man	32.15	
15	1	8	Molly Renshaw	England	32.18	
16	2	8	Bronagh Ryan	New Zealand	32.70	

=== Final ===
Rank	Lane	Name	Nationality	Time	Notes
1st place, gold medalist(s)	5	Sarah Vasey	England	30.60	
2nd place, silver medalist(s)	4	Alia Atkinson	Jamaica	30.76	
3rd place, bronze medalist(s)	7	Leiston Pickett	Australia	30.78	
4	2	Tatjana Schoenmaker	South Africa	30.82	AF
5	6	Jessica Hansen	Australia	30.83	
6	3	Georgia Bohl	Australia	30.88	
7	1	Faith Knelson	Canada	30.98	
8	8	Roanne Ho	Singapore	31.32	
