= Badminton at the 2018 Commonwealth Games =

- Venue: Carrara Sports and Leisure Centre
- Dates: 5–15 April
- Nations: 29

Badminton at the 2018 Commonwealth Games was the 14th appearance of Badminton at the Commonwealth Games. The badminton events were held on the Gold Coast, Australia and took place between Thursday 5 April and Sunday 15 April at the Carrara Sports and Leisure Centre.

Badminton is one of ten core sports at the Commonwealth Games and has been continuously held at the Games since its first appearance at the 1966 British Empire and Commonwealth Games in Kingston, Jamaica. The badminton programme in 2018 included men's and women's singles competitions; men's, women's and mixed doubles competitions alongside a mixed team event throughout the 11 days of competition. The draw for the mixed team event was held on 6 February at The Star Gold Coast.

== Schedule ==
GS	Group stage	¼	Quarter-finals	½	Semi-finals	B	Bronze medal match	G	Gold medal match

Date →	Thu 5			Fri 6			Sat 7		Sun 8		Mon 9		Tue 10		Wed 11		Thu 12		Fri 13		Sat 14		Sun 15
Event ↓	M	A	E	M	A	E	M	E	M	E	M	A	M	A	M	A	A	E	A	E	M	E	M
Men's singles													GS						¼		½	B	G
Men's doubles													GS						¼		½	B	G
Women's singles													GS						¼		½	B	G
Women's doubles													GS						¼		½	B	G
Mixed doubles													GS						¼		½	B	G
Mixed team	GS						¼		½		B	G											

M = Morning session, A = Afternoon session, E = Evening session

== Medal table ==
Rank	Nation	Gold	Silver	Bronze	Total
1	India	2	3	1	6
2	England	2	2	2	6
3	Malaysia	2	1	2	5
4	Scotland	0	0	1	1
Totals (4 entries)		6	6	6	18

== Medal summary ==
Event	Gold	Silver	Bronze
Men's singles	Lee Chong Wei; Malaysia	Srikanth Kidambi; India	Rajiv Ouseph; England
Men's doubles	England; Marcus Ellis; Chris Langridge	India; Satwiksairaj Rankireddy; Chirag Shetty	Malaysia; Goh V Shem; Tan Wee Kiong
Women's singles	Saina Nehwal; India	P. V. Sindhu; India	Kirsty Gilmour; Scotland
Women's doubles	Malaysia; Chow Mei Kuan; Vivian Hoo	England; Lauren Smith; Sarah Walker	India; Ashwini Ponnappa; N. Sikki Reddy
Mixed doubles	England; Chris Adcock; Gabby Adcock	England; Marcus Ellis; Lauren Smith	Malaysia; Chan Peng Soon; Goh Liu Ying
Mixed team	India; Srikanth Kidambi; Saina Nehwal; Satwiksairaj Rankireddy; Ashwini Ponnappa; Pranav Chopra; Chirag Shetty; N. Sikki Reddy; Gadde Ruthvika Shivani; P. V. Sindhu; Prannoy Kumar	Malaysia; Chan Peng Soon; Soniia Cheah; Chow Mei Kuan; Goh Liu Ying; Goh Soon Huat; Goh V Shem; Vivian Hoo Kah Mun; Shevon Jemie Lai; Lee Chong Wei; Tan Wee Kiong	England; Chris Adcock; Gabby Adcock; Chloe Birch; Marcus Ellis; Ben Lane; Chris Langridge; Rajiv Ouseph; Jessica Pugh; Lauren Smith; Sarah Walker

== Participating nations ==
There are 29 participating associations in badminton with a total of 153 athletes.

- Australia (10)
- Barbados (2)
- Cameroon (2)
- Canada (8)
- England (10)
- Falkland Islands (5)
- Fiji (6)
- Ghana (8)
- Guernsey (4)
- Guyana (1)
- India (10)
- Isle of Man (4)
- Jamaica (5)
- Jersey (4)
- Kenya (2)
- Malaysia (10)
- Mauritius (6)
- New Zealand (2)
- Northern Ireland (3)
- Pakistan (4)
- Saint Helena (1)
- Scotland (8)
- Seychelles (4)
- Singapore (10)
- South Africa (6)
- Sri Lanka (8)
- Trinidad and Tobago (2)
- Uganda (4)
- Zambia (4)
