= Zambia at the 2018 Commonwealth Games =

- Flag of Zambia
- CG code: ZAM
- CGA: National Olympic Committee of Zambia
- Website: nocz.co.zm

in Gold Coast, Australia 4 April 2018 – 15 April 2018
- Competitors: 36 in 8 sports
- Flag bearer: Kelvin Ndhlovu (opening)
- Medals Ranked 0th: Gold 0 Silver 0 Bronze 0 Total 0

Commonwealth Games appearances (overview)
- 1954; 1958; 1962–1966; 1970; 1974; 1978; 1982; 1986; 1990; 1994; 1998; 2002; 2006; 2010; 2014; 2018; 2022; 2026; 2030

Other related appearances
- Rhodesia and Nyasaland (1962)

Zambia competed at the 2018 Commonwealth Games in the Gold Coast, Australia from April 4 to April 15, 2018 It was Zambia's 14th appearance at the Commonwealth Games.

Squash athlete Kelvin Ndhlovu was the country's flag bearer during the opening ceremony.

== Competitors ==
The following is the list of number of competitors participating at the Games per sport/discipline.

Sport	Men	Women	Total
Athletics	2	1	3
Badminton	2	2	4
Boxing	5	0	5
Lawn bowls	0	5	5
Rugby sevens	12	0	12
Squash	2	0	2
Swimming	3	1	4
Table tennis	1	0	1
Total	27	9	36

== Athletics ==
Men
Track & road events

Athlete	Event	Heat		Semifinal		Final	
Athlete	Event	Result	Rank	Result	Rank	Result	Rank
Sydney Siame	200 m	20.65	2 Q	20.51	3 q	20.62	5
Daniel Mbewe	400 m	46.45	3 Q	46.77	6	did not advance	

Women
Track & road events

Athlete	Event	Heat		Semifinal		Final	
Athlete	Event	Result	Rank	Result	Rank	Result	Rank
Quincy Malekani	400 m	52.40	4 Q	54.36	7	did not advance	

== Badminton ==
Zambia participated with four athletes (two men and two women)

Singles

Athlete	Event	Round of 64	Round of 32	Round of 16	Quarterfinal	Semifinal	Final / BM	
Athlete	Event	Opposition Score	Opposition Score	Opposition Score	Opposition Score	Opposition Score	Opposition Score	Rank
Chongo Mulenga	Men's singles	Benjamin Li (IOM); L 0 - 2	did not advance					
Kalombo Mulenga	Men's singles	Alexander Hutchings (JER); W 2 - 0	Dakeil Thorpe (BAR); W 2 - 0	Rajiv Ouseph (ENG); L 0 - 2	did not advance			
Everlyn Siamupangila	Women's singles	Kimberley Clague (IOM); L 0 - 2	did not advance					
Ogar Siamupangila	Women's singles	Stella Koteikai Amasah (GHA); W 2 - 0	Jessica Li (IOM); L 0 - 2	did not advance				

Doubles

Athlete	Event	Round of 64	Round of 32	Round of 16	Quarterfinal	Semifinal	Final / BM	
Athlete	Event	Opposition Score	Opposition Score	Opposition Score	Opposition Score	Opposition Score	Opposition Score	Rank
Chongo Mulenga; Kalombo Mulenga	Men's doubles	—N/a	Sachin Dias (SRI); Buwaneka Goonethilleka (SRI); L 0 - 2	did not advance				
Everlyn Siamupangila; Ogar Siamupangila	Women's doubles	—N/a	Chow Mei Kuan (MAS); Vivian Hoo (MAS); L 0 - 2	did not advance				
Ogar Siamupangila; Kalombo Mulenga	Mixed doubles	Bye	Ty Alexander Lindeman (CAN); Brittney Tam (CAN); L 0 - 2	did not advance				
Everlyn Siamupangila; Chongo Mulenga	Mixed doubles	Prakash Vijayanath (RSA); Johanita Scholtz (RSA); L 0 - 2	did not advance					

Mixed team

Roster

- Chongo Mulenga
- Kalombo Mulenga
- Everlyn Siamupangila
- Ogar Siamupangila

Pool B

Pos	Team	Pld	W	L	MF	MA	MD	GF	GA	GD	PF	PA	PD	Pts	Qualification
1	Singapore	3	3	0	15	0	+15	30	0	+30	630	308	+322	3	Knockout stage
2	Mauritius	3	2	1	10	5	+5	20	13	+7	603	542	+61	2	Knockout stage
3	Jamaica	3	1	2	5	10	−5	13	23	−10	540	675	−135	1	
4	Zambia	3	0	3	0	15	−15	3	30	−27	435	683	−248	0	

Source: GC2018

Mauritius
5
Carrara Sports and Leisure Centre, Gold Coast
5 April

Zambia
0

			1	2	3
1	(Mauritius) (Zambia)	Julien Paul; Kalombo Mulenga	21; 19	22; 20
2	(Mauritius) (Zambia)	Kate Foo Kune; Ogar Siamupangila	21; 15	21; 8
3	(Mauritius) (Zambia)	Aatish Lubah / Christopher Jean Paul; Kalombo Mulenga / Chongo Mulenga	21; 10	21; 15
4	(Mauritius) (Zambia)	Kate Foo Kune / Aurélie Allet; Ogar Siamupangila / Evelyn Siamupangila	21; 15	21; 18
5	(Mauritius) (Zambia)	Julien Paul / Aurélie Allet; Chongo Mulenga / Evelyn Siamupangila	21; 9	21; 16

Singapore
5
Carrara Sports and Leisure Centre, Gold Coast
5 April

Zambia
0

			1	2	3
1	(Singapore) (Zambia)	Jason Wong / Ren-ne Ong; Kalombo Mulenga / Ogar Siamupangila	21; 10	21; 10
2	(Singapore) (Zambia)	Ryan Ng; Chongo Mulenga	21; 14	21; 11
3	(Singapore) (Zambia)	Grace Chua; Evelyn Siamupangila	21; 3	21; 2
4	(Singapore) (Zambia)	Tery Hee / Danny Bawa Chrisnanta; Kalombo Mulenga / Chongo Mulenga	21; 4	21; 18
5	(Singapore) (Zambia)	Ren-ne Ong / Crystal Wong; Ogar Siamupangila / Evelyn Siamupangila	21; 7	21; 9

Zambia
0
Carrara Sports and Leisure Centre, Gold Coast
6 April

Jamaica
5

			1	2	3
1	(Zambia) (Jamaica)	Chongo Mulenga / Evelyn Siamupangila; Anthony McNee / Alana Bailey	21; 14	9; 21	9; 21
2	(Zambia) (Jamaica)	Kalombo Mulenga; Samuel Ricketts	12; 21	9; 21
3	(Zambia) (Jamaica)	Ogar Siamupangila; Katherine Wynter	22; 20	20; 22	15; 21
4	(Zambia) (Jamaica)	Kalombo Mulenga / Chongo Mulenga; Anthony McNee / Dennis Coke	9; 21	21; 23
5	(Zambia) (Jamaica)	Ogar Siamupangila / Evelyn Siamupangila; Alana Bailey / Katherine Wynter	15; 21	21; 15	19; 21

== Boxing ==
Zambia participated with a team of 5 athletes (5 men).

Men

Athlete	Event	Round of 32	Round of 16	Quarterfinals	Semifinals	Final	Rank
Athlete	Event	Opposition Result	Opposition Result	Opposition Result	Opposition Result	Opposition Result	Rank
Everisto Mulenga	−56 kg	—N/a	Manjwango (TAN); W 5-0	Mohammed (IND); L 0-5	did not advance		
Emmanuel Ngoma	−60 kg	Steven (KIR); W 5–0	McGivern (NIR); L RSC	did not advance			
Nkumbu Silungwe	−64 kg	Bye	Edwards (WAL); W 5 - 0	Blumenfeld (CAN); L 0 - 5	did not advance		
Benny Muziyo	−75 kg	Bye	Cooke (DMA); W KO	Yadav (IND); L 0 - 5	did not advance		
Mbachi Kaonga	−81 kg	—N/a	Abaka (KEN); W 4 - 1	Waterman (AUS); L 1 - 4	did not advance		

== Lawn bowls ==
Zambia will compete in Lawn bowls.

Women

Athlete	Event	Group Stage						Quarterfinal	Semifinal	Final / BM	
Athlete	Event	Opposition Score	Opposition Score	Opposition Score	Opposition Score	Opposition Score	Rank	Opposition Score	Opposition Score	Opposition Score	Rank
Getrude Siame	Singles	Beattie (NIR); L 14 - 21	Kioa (TGA); L 10 - 21	Murphy (AUS); L 3 - 21	Piketh (RSA); L 9 - 21	—N/a	5	did not advance			
Foster Banda; Eddah Mpezeni	Pairs	Australia; L 5 - 24	Papua New Guinea; W 18 - 13	England; L 5 - 30	Malta; L 12 - 24	Niue; W 24 - 10	4	did not advance			
Sophia Matipa; Mildred Mkandawire; Getrude Siame	Triples	New Zealand; L 12 - 24	Jersey; L 12 - 26	Wales; L 20 - 23	Namibia; L 9 - 19	—N/a	5	did not advance			
Foster Banda; Sophia Matipa; Mildred Mkandawire; Eddah Mpezeni	Fours	South Africa; L 10 - 17	Jersey; W 22 - 9	New Zealand; L 8 - 21	Norfolk Island; W 17 - 9	—N/a	3	did not advance			

== Rugby sevens ==
=== Men's tournament ===
Zambia qualified a men's rugby sevens team of 12 athletes, by finishing in second place among Commonwealth nations at the 2017 Africa Cup Sevens. This will mark the country's Commonwealth Games debut in the sport.

Roster

- Davy Chimbukulu
- Martin Chisanga
- Edmond Hamayuwa
- Israel Kalumba
- Carlos Kanyama
- Fernard Kashimoto
- Larry Kaushiku
- Terry Kayamba
- Guy Lipschitz
- Sheleni Michelo
- Laston Mukosa
- Edward Mumba

Pool C

Pos	Team	Pld	W	D	L	PF	PA	PD	Pts	Qualification
1	New Zealand	3	3	0	0	127	14	+113	9	Semi-finals
2	Kenya	3	2	0	1	80	50	+30	7	Classification semi-finals
3	Canada	3	1	0	2	64	59	+5	5	
4	Zambia	3	0	0	3	0	148	−148	3	

Source: GC2018
Rules for classification: 1) Points; 2) Head-to-head result; 3) Point difference; 4) Points scored.

14 April 2018
10:37

New Zealand	54–0	Zambia
Try: Koroi 1' c Nanai-Seturo 4' c Molia 7' m Mikkelson 8' c Rokolisoa 8' c Baker 10' c Knewstubb 11' c Ware 14' c Con: Baker (2/3) 1', 8'; Koroi (1/1) 4'; Rokolisoa (2/2) 9', 10'; Knewstubb (2/2) 11', 14'	(Gold Coast 2018)

Robina Stadium, Gold Coast
Referee: Damon Murphy (Australia)

14 April 2018
13:55

Canada	47–0	Zambia
Try: Hirayama 1' m Fuailefau (3) 2' c, 8' c, 11' c Douglas 4' c Coe 6' c Hammond 7' c Con: Hirayama (6/7) 3', 4', 6', 7', 8', 12'	(Gold Coast 2018)	Cards: Sheleni (yellow card) 8' to 10'

Robina Stadium, Gold Coast
Referee: Jordan Way (Australia)

14 April 2018
20:27

Kenya	47–0	Zambia
Try: Owira 2' m Oluoch (2) 3' c, 9' c Oyoo (2) 5' c, 11' c Odhiambo 7' c Injera 7' c Con: Agero (6/7) 3', 5', 7', 7', 9', 11'	(Gold Coast 2018)

Robina Stadium, Gold Coast
Referee: Tevita Rokovereni (Fiji)

== Squash ==
Zambia participated with 2 athletes (2 men).

Individual

Athlete	Event	Round of 64	Round of 32	Round of 16	Quarterfinals	Semifinals	Final	
Athlete	Event	Opposition Score	Opposition Score	Opposition Score	Opposition Score	Opposition Score	Opposition Score	Rank
Manda Chilambwe	Men's singles	Malhotra (IND); L 0 - 3	did not advance					
Kelvin Ndhlovu	Men's singles	Navas (GIB); W 3 - 0	Coll (NZL); L 0 - 3	did not advance				

Doubles

Athlete	Event	Group stage			Round of 16	Quarterfinals	Semifinals	Final	
Athlete	Event	Opposition Score	Opposition Score	Rank	Opposition Score	Opposition Score	Opposition Score	Opposition Score	Rank
Manda Chilambwe; Kelvin Ndhlovu	Men's doubles	Clyne / Lobban (SCO); L 0 - 2	Khalil / Seth (GUY); L 1 - 2	3	did not advance				

== Swimming ==
Zambia participated with 4 athletes (3 men and 1 woman).

Men

Athlete	Event	Heat		Semifinal		Final	
Athlete	Event	Time	Rank	Time	Rank	Time	Rank
Alexandros Axiotis	50 m backstroke	28.77	15 Q	28.57	15	did not advance	
Alexandros Axiotis	50 m breaststroke	30.10	22	did not advance			
Ralph Goveia	50 m breaststroke	DNS		did not advance			
Moonakala Kumaren	50 m breaststroke	31.36	28	did not advance			
Alexandros Axiotis	100 m breaststroke	1:06.49	18	did not advance			
Ralph Goveia	50 m butterfly	24.62	15 Q	24.49	14	did not advance	
Moonakala Kumaren	50 m butterfly	27.96	49	did not advance			
Ralph Goveia	100 m butterfly	54.58	12 Q	54.10	10	did not advance	

Women

Athlete	Event	Heat		Semifinal		Final	
Athlete	Event	Time	Rank	Time	Rank	Time	Rank
Tilka Paljk	50 m freestyle	27.47	22	did not advance			
Tilka Paljk	50 m breaststroke	32.16	14 Q	32.05	13	did not advance	
Tilka Paljk	100 m breaststroke	1:12.01	21	did not advance			

== Table tennis ==
Zambia participated with 1 athlete (1 man).

Singles

Athletes	Event	Group Stage			Round of 64	Round of 32	Round of 16	Quarterfinal	Semifinal	Final	Rank
Athletes	Event	Opposition Score	Opposition Score	Rank	Opposition Score	Opposition Score	Opposition Score	Opposition Score	Opposition Score	Opposition Score	Rank
Kennedy Katungu	Men's singles	McCreery (NIR); L 0 - 4	Wing (FIJ); W 4 - 1	2	did not advance						

== See also ==
- Zambia at the 2018 Summer Youth Olympics
