= Badminton at the 2018 Commonwealth Games – Women's singles =

Badminton – Women's singles at the 2018 Commonwealth Games
- Venue: Carrara Sports and Leisure Centre, Gold Coast
- Dates: 10–15 April

Medalists
gold medal	Saina Nehwal	India
silver medal	P. V. Sindhu	India
bronze medal	Kirsty Gilmour	Scotland

The women's singles badminton event at the 2018 Commonwealth Games was held from 10 to 15 April 2018 at the Carrara Sports and Leisure Centre on the Gold Coast, Australia. The defending gold medalist was Michelle Li of Canada.

The athletes were drawn into straight knockout stage. The draw for the competition was conducted on 2 April 2018.

== Seeds ==
The seeds for the tournament were:

1. P. V. Sindhu (IND) (silver medalist)
2. Saina Nehwal (IND) (gold medalist)
3. Michelle Li (CAN) (fourth place)
4. Kirsty Gilmour (SCO) (bronze medalist)

5. Soniia Cheah (MAS) (quarter-finals)
6. Rachel Honderich (CAN) (quarter-finals)
7. Brittney Tam (CAN) (quarter-finals)
8. Gadde Ruthvika Shivani (IND) (quarter-finals)

Click on the seed number of a player to go to their draw section.

== Results ==
=== Finals ===
Semi-finals
1	P. V. Sindhu (IND)	21	21
3	Michelle Li (CAN)	18	8
4	Kirsty Gilmour (SCO)	14	21	17
2	Saina Nehwal (IND)	21	18	21

Gold medal match
1	P. V. Sindhu (IND)	18	21
2	Saina Nehwal (IND)	21	23
Bronze medal match
3	Michelle Li (CAN)	11	16
4	Kirsty Gilmour (SCO)	21	21

=== Top half ===
==== Section 1 ====
Round of 64
Eyram Migbodzi (GHA)	2	3
Wendy Chen (AUS)	21	21
Palwasha Bashir (PAK)	18	12
Nicki Chan-Lam (MRI)	21	21
Hasini Ambalangodage (SRI)	21	21
Emily Temple Redshaw (JER)	18	11

Round of 32
1	P. V. Sindhu (IND)	21	21
Andra Whiteside (FIJ)	6	3
Zoe Morris (FAI)	3	2
Wendy Chen (AUS)	21	21
7	Brittney Tam (CAN)	21	21
Nicki Chan-Lam (MRI)	14	13
Kate Foo Kune (MRI)	21	21
Hasini Ambalangodage (SRI)	12	12

Round of 16
1	P. V. Sindhu (IND)	21	21
Wendy Chen (AUS)	15	9
7	Brittney Tam (CAN)	21	16	21
Kate Foo Kune (MRI)	16	21	16

Quarter-finals
1	P. V. Sindhu (IND)	21	21
7	Brittney Tam (CAN)	14	17

==== Section 2 ====
Round of 64
Everlyn Siamupangila (ZAM)	11	9
Kimberley Clague (IOM)	21	21
Katherine Wynter (JAM)	21	21
Chloe le Tissier (GUE)	18	16
Rachael Darragh (NIR)	21	21
Stella Ngadjui (CMR)	6	3
Cheryl March (FAI)	1	0
Grace Chua (SGP)	21	21

Round of 32
3	Michelle Li (CAN)	21	21
Kimberley Clague (IOM)	7	7
Aisha Nakiyemba (UGA)	18	15
Katherine Wynter (JAM)	21	21
5	Soniia Cheah (MAS)	21	21
Rachael Darragh (NIR)	5	12
Michelle Butler-Emmett (RSA)	5	12
Grace Chua (SGP)	21	21

Round of 16
3	Michelle Li (CAN)	21	21
Katherine Wynter (JAM)	10	7
5	Soniia Cheah (MAS)	21	21
Grace Chua (SGP)	11	12

Quarter-finals
3	Michelle Li (CAN)	21	21
5	Soniia Cheah (MAS)	12	19

=== Bottom half ===
==== Section 3 ====
Round of 64
Karyn Gibson (FIJ)	6	6
Yeo Jia Min (SGP)	21	21
Grace Atipaka (GHA)	21	21
Juliette Ah-Wan (SEY)	17	19
Chloe Birch (ENG)	21	21
Johanita Scholtz (RSA)	5	8
Aurélie Allet (MRI)	21	21
Alana Bailey (JAM)	7	12

Round of 32
Yeo Jia Min (SGP)	w	/	o
Shamim Bangi (UGA)
Grace Atipaka (GHA)	5	7
8	Gadde Ruthvika Shivani (IND)	21	21
Chloe Birch (ENG)	21	21
Elise Dixon (JER)	2	5
Aurélie Allet (MRI)	3	4
4	Kirsty Gilmour (SCO)	21	21

Round of 16
Yeo Jia Min (SGP)	10	23	10
8	Gadde Ruthvika Shivani (IND)	21	21	21
Chloe Birch (ENG)	20	12
4	Kirsty Gilmour (SCO)	22	21

Quarter-finals
8	Gadde Ruthvika Shivani (IND)	5^{r}
4	Kirsty Gilmour (SCO)	9

==== Section 4 ====
Round of 64
Alissa Dean (FIJ)	12	3
Mahoor Shahzad (PAK)	21	21
Mercy Joseph (KEN)
Allisen Camille (SEY)	w	/	o
Ogar Siamupangila (ZAM)	21	21
Stella Koteikai Amasah (GHA)	6	12

Round of 32
Mahoor Shahzad (PAK)	21	21
Cristen Marritt (IOM)	14	10
Allisen Camille (SEY)
6	Rachel Honderich (CAN)	w	/	o
Ogar Siamupangila (ZAM)	9	13
Jessica Li (IOM)	21	21
Elsie de Villiers (RSA)	3	1
2	Saina Nehwal (IND)	21	21

Round of 16
Mahoor Shahzad (PAK)	17	10
6	Rachel Honderich (CAN)	21	21
Jessica Li (IOM)	4	0^{r}
2	Saina Nehwal (IND)	21	2

Quarter-finals
6	Rachel Honderich (CAN)	8	13
2	Saina Nehwal (IND)	21	21
