= Anjum Moudgil =

Indian sport shooter (born 1994)

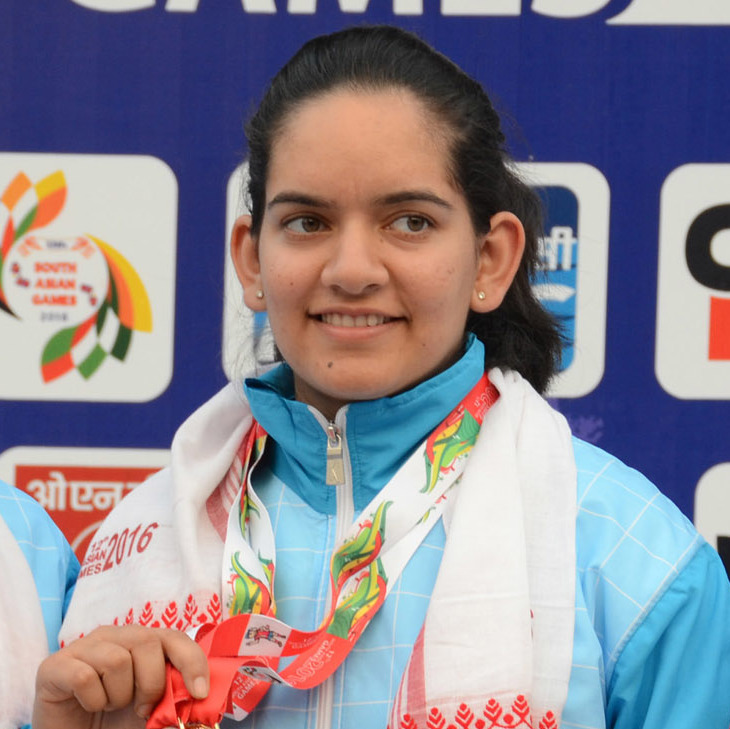
- Moudgil at the 2016 South Asian Games

Personal information
- Nationality: Indian
- Born: 5 January 1994 (age 32) Chandigarh, India
- Education: DAV College, Chandigarh
- Height: 1.65 m (5 ft 5 in)
- Spouse: Ankush Bharadwaj

Sport
- Sport: Shooting
- Events: 50 m rifle 3 positions 10 m air rifle
- Coached by: Deepali Deshpande

Achievements and titles
- Highest world ranking: 50 m rifle 3 positions: 1 (2022); 10 m air rifle: 2 (2018)
Medal record
Women's shooting
Representing India
Event	1st	2nd	3rd
World Championships	0	2	0
World Cup	2	3	2
Asian Championships	2	1	1
Commonwealth Games	0	1	0
Commonwealth Championships	0	1	1
South Asian Games	2	0	0
Total	6	8	4
World Championships
Silver medal – second place	2018 Changwon	10 m air rifle
Silver medal – second place	2018 Changwon	10 m air rifle team
World Cup
Gold medal – first place	2019 Munich	10 m rifle mixed team
Gold medal – first place	2019 Beijing	10 m rifle mixed team
Silver medal – second place	2018 Guadalajara	50 m rifle 3 positions
Silver medal – second place	2021 New Delhi	50 m rifle 3 positions team
Silver medal – second place	2022 Baku	50 m rifle 3 positions
Bronze medal – third place	2022 Changwon	50 m rifle 3 positions
Bronze medal – third place	2022 Changwon	50 m rifle 3 positions team
Asian Championships
Gold medal – first place	2019 Doha	50 m rifle prone team
Gold medal – first place	2025 Shymkent	50 m rifle 3 positions team
Silver medal – second place	2019 Doha	10 m air rifle team
Bronze medal – third place	2015 Kuwait City	50 m rifle 3 positions team
Bronze medal – third place	2026 New Delhi	50m Rifle 3 Positions
Commonwealth Games
Silver medal – second place	2018 Gold Coast	50 m rifle 3 positions
Commonwealth Championships
Silver medal – second place	2017 Brisbane	10 m air rifle
Bronze medal – third place	2017 Brisbane	50 m rifle prone
South Asian Games
Gold medal – first place	2016 Guwahati and Shillong	50 m rifle 3 positions
Gold medal – first place	2016 Guwahati and Shillong	50 m rifle 3 positions team

Anjum Moudgil (born 5 January 1994) is an Indian sport shooter.

== Early life ==
Anjum took up shooting while studying in Sacred Heart Senior Secondary School in Chandigarh. She completed her graduation and post graduation in humanities from DAV College, Chandigarh. She completed her master's degree in sports psychology. She is an avid abstract artist and has sold many of her artworks.

She became a sub-inspector (SI) with Punjab Police, India.

== Career ==
First Indian Female athlete to win World championship medal in Olympic event At the ISSF World Championship in Changwon, Anjum Moudgil won a silver medal in the women's 10m air rifle event.

The 24-year-old Anjum shot a total of 248.4 in the eight-women final to open the Indian senior squad's medal account in the prestigious tournament.

=== 2016 ===
She took 9th position at the 2016 World Cup, Munich and silver medal in World University Championship. She took gold in South Asian Games.

=== 2017 ===
She won the silver medal in 10m Air Rifle Sardar Sajjan Singh Sethi Memorial Masters.

=== 2018 ===
She won a silver medal in the women's 50m Rifle 3 Positions (3P) event at the ISSF World Cup in Mexico. At the Commonwealth Games (CWG) she secured the silver medal, scoring 455.7 points, achieving 151.9 in kneeling and 157.1 in prone. In the qualification round, she broke the CWG Qualifying record by a significant margin. Moudgil scored 589 (196 in kneeling, 199 in prone and 194 in standing).HOLDS THE CWG record till date.

=== 2019 ===
On 1 May 2019, Anjum claimed the world number 2 spot in women's 10m Air Rifle ISSF rankings. She was India's No. 1 in Women's 50m 3P.

== Awards ==
Anjum is one of only 1 athlete picked by the selection committee for the Arjuna Award year 2019 for Shooting Sport She has been nominated for Khel Ratna twice.
