= Jake Kelly (cyclist) =

British cyclist

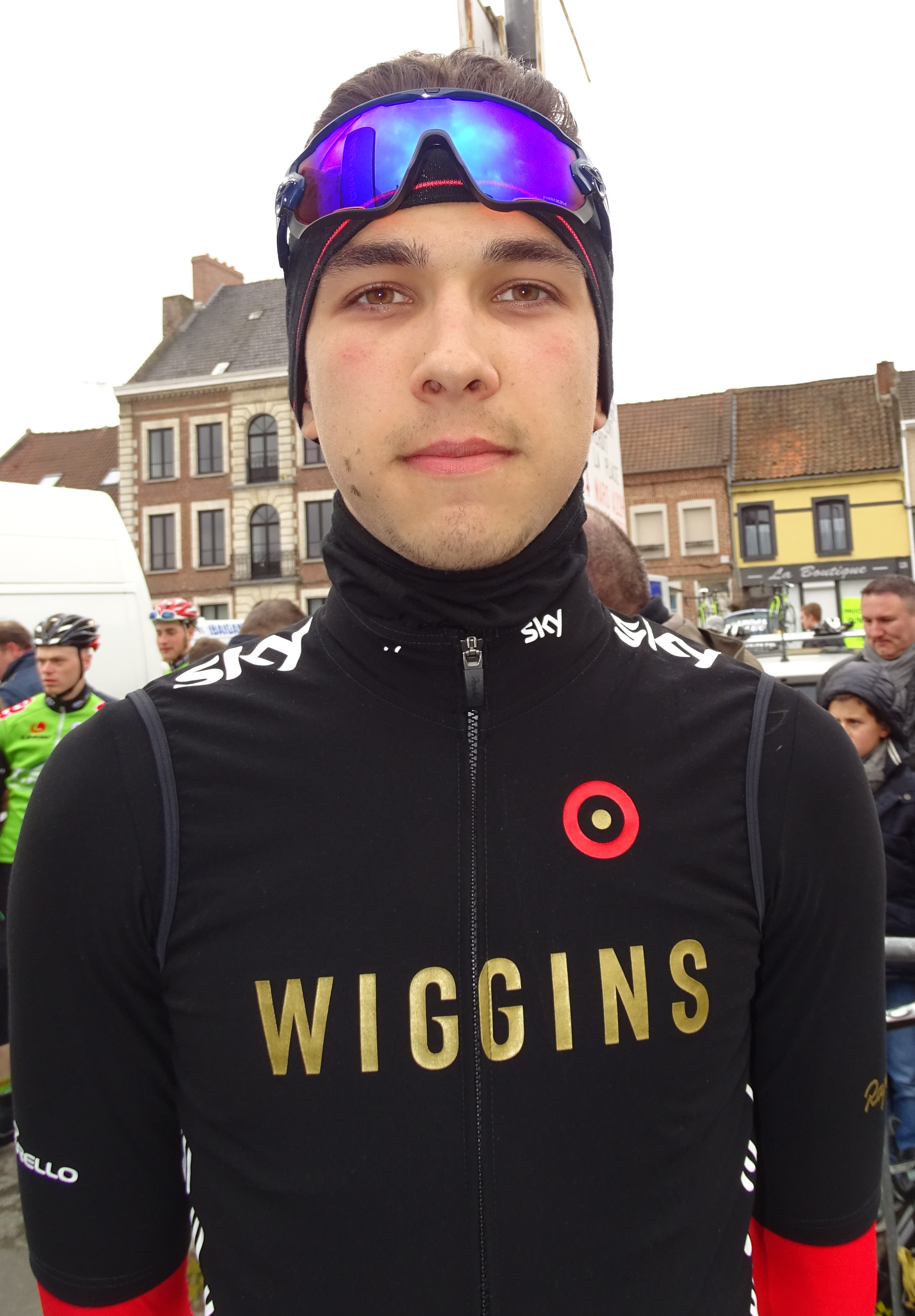
- Kelly in 2016

Personal information
- Born: 17 January 1995 (age 31) Douglas, Isle of Man

Cycling career
- Sport: Cycling
- Disciplines: Road and track
- Role: Rider
- Rider type: Pursuit

Amateur teams
- 2014: ILLI-Bikes
- 2015: 100% ME

Professional teams
- 2016–2017: WIGGINS
- 2018: ONE Pro Cycling

Jake Kelly (born 1995) is a British and Manx former road and track cyclist.

== Cycling career ==
Kelly won the team pursuit at the 2015 British National Track Championships.

He represented the Isle of Man at the 2018 Commonwealth Games, finishing 32nd in the road race and 21st in the time trial.

== Major results ==
2015
1st Team pursuit, National Track Championships (with Germain Burton, Mark Stewart & Oliver Wood)
2016
4th Rutland–Melton International CiCLE Classic
