= Mehuli Ghosh =

Indian sport shooter (born 2000)

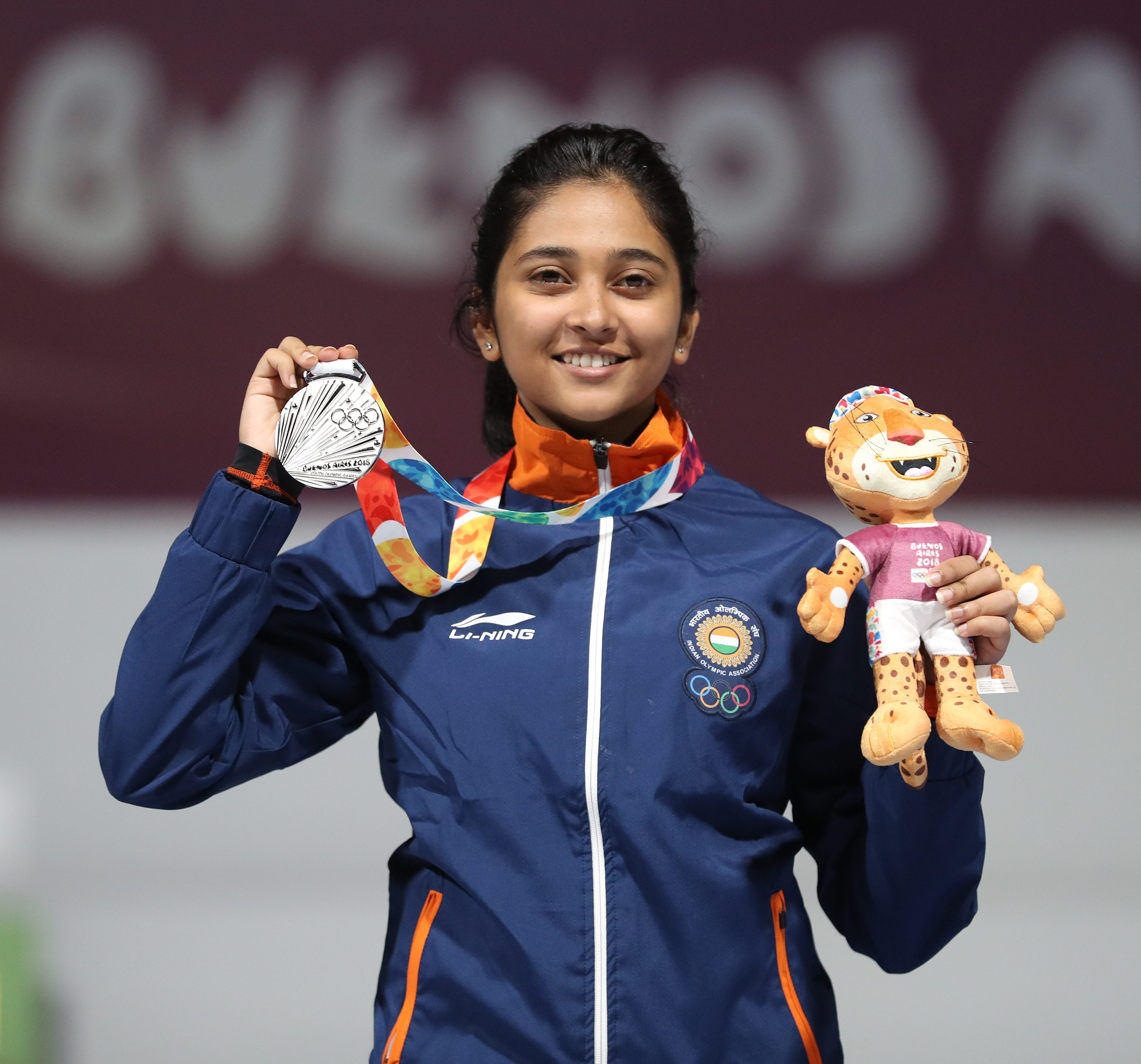
- Ghosh at the 2018 Youth Olympics

Personal information
- Nationality: Indian
- Born: 20 November 2000 (age 25)
- Education: Adamas University
- Years active: 2014–present

Sport
- Sport: Shooting
- Event: 10 m air rifle
Medal record
Women's shooting
Representing India
World Championships
Gold medal – first place	2023 Baku	10m air rifle team
Silver medal – second place	2018 Changwon	10m air rifle team
Bronze medal – third place	2022 Cairo	10m air rifle team
Bronze medal – third place	Baku 2023	10m air rifle
Commonwealth Games
Silver medal – second place	2018 Gold Coast	Individual
Asian Games
Silver medal – second place	2022 Hangzhou	Team
Asian Championships
Gold medal – first place	2022 Daegu	10 m air rifle
Gold medal – first place	2022 Daegu	10 m air rifle team
Gold medal – first place	2022 Daegu	10 m air rifle mixed team
Bronze medal – third place	2025 Shymkent	Team
South Asian Games
Gold medal – first place	2019 Kathmandu	Individual
Gold medal – first place	2019 Kathmandu	Mixed Team
Gold medal – first place	2019 Kathmandu	Team
Youth Olympic Games
Silver medal – second place	2018 Buenos Aires	10m air rifle

Mehuli Ghosh (Bengali: মেহুলি ঘোষ; born 20 November 2000) is an Indian sport shooter. She represents India at international junior shooting championships across the world. Among 123 competitors, she was the only Indian shooting athlete to reach the finals of the 2018 junior shooting competition held in the Czech Republic. She ranked seventh there. In 2018, at the XXI Commonwealth Games held at Gold Coast, Australia, she won a silver medal in Women's 10m Air Rifle after a shoot-off with Martina Veloso. As of September 2023, she was ranked 36th in the world and 14th in Asia.

== Early career ==
Mehuli joined the Serampore Rifle Club in 2014. She was banned by the club for accidentally hitting a person during practice. Later, Mehuli was mentored and coached by former Indian Olympic finalist and Arjuna Awardee, Joydeep Karmarkar.

She received her training at the Joydeep Karmarkar Shooting Academy. In 2016, she qualified for the Indian National Shooting Championships held in Pune. She received two gold medals and seven silver medals at the national championships. In the 2017 National Championships, Mehuli won eight gold and three bronze medals, and was judged Best Shooter.

== Professional career ==
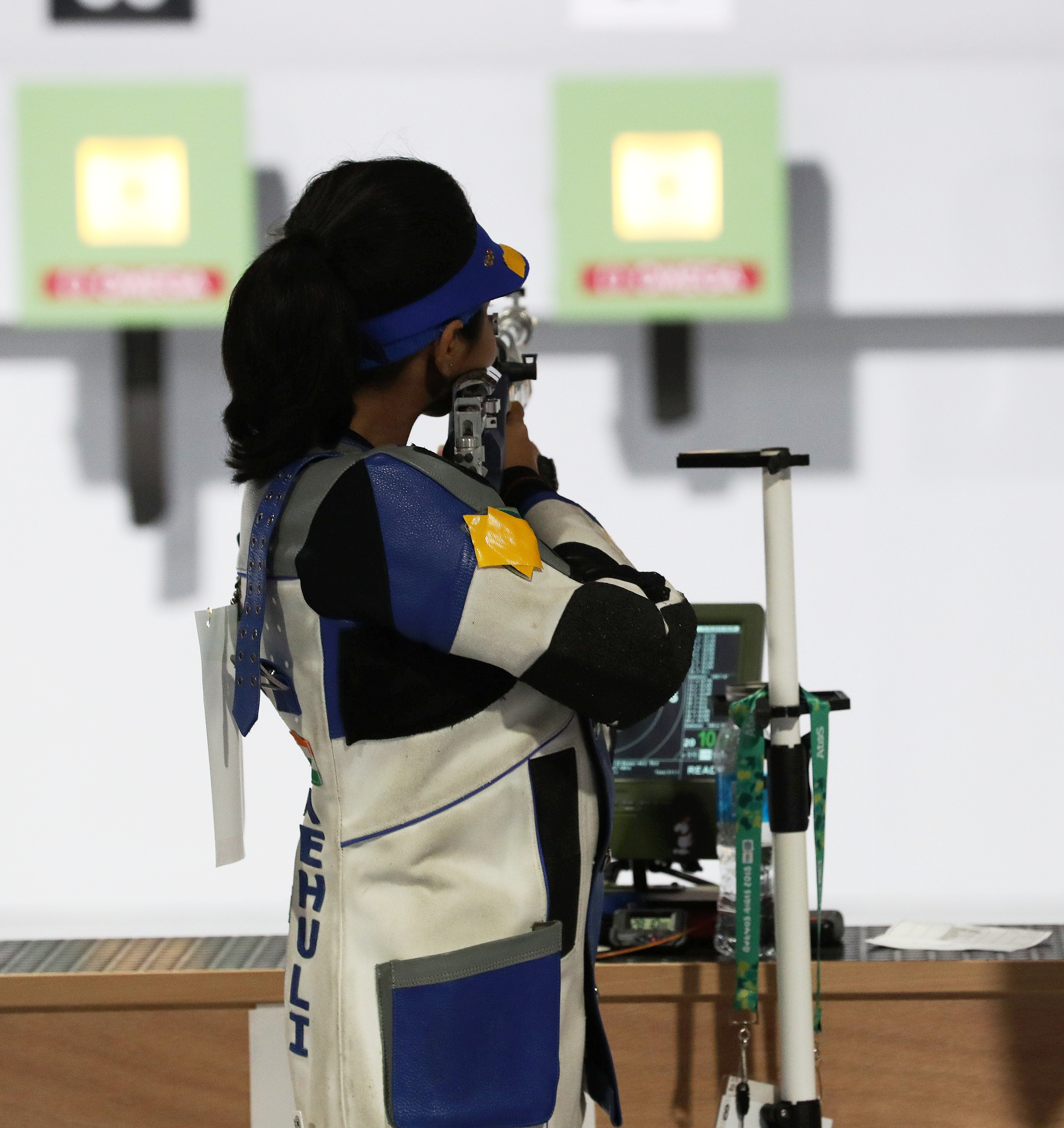
Mehuli Ghosh during the qualification for the Girls' 10 metre air rifle final at the 2018 Summer Youth Olympics.

In 2017, she participated at the preparatory junior shooting championship held in the Czech Republic and finished at the seventh position. She finished in 17th position at the Junior World Shooting Championship held in Germany. Mehuli became Asian Champion in December 2017 in Wako City, Japan, with a score of 420.1, and received a quota place for the Youth Olympics in 2018. In March 2018, she became one of the youngest Indian competitors to win two World Cup medals at the ISSF World Cup held in Mexico. During the competition, she set a new Junior World Record. Mehuli also qualified to participate in the Commonwealth Games in 2018. In 2018, at the XXI Commonwealth Games held in Gold Coast, Australia, she won silver in Women's 10m Air Rifle after a shoot-off with Martina Veloso. In 2019, she won gold at the South Asian Games in Nepal.

Ghosh was award the "Female Young Athlete of the Year" award at the Sportstar Aces Awards in 2020.
