= Martina Veloso =

Singaporean sport shooter

Martina Lindsay Veloso
Personal information
- Born: 27 October 1999 (age 27) Singapore
- Height: 1.60 m (5 ft 3 in)
- Weight: 55 kg (121 lb)

Sport
- Sport: Shooting
- Events: 10 m air rifle (AR40), 50m 3 Positions
Medal record
Women's shooting
Representing Singapore
| Event | 1st | 2nd | 3rd |
|---|---|---|---|
| Commonwealth Games | 2 | 0 | 0 |
| Summer Youth Olympics | 0 | 1 | 0 |
| ISSF World Cup | 1 | 0 | 0 |
| Commonwealth Championships | 0 | 0 | 2 |
| Total | 3 | 1 | 2 |
Asian Championships
| Silver medal – second place | 2023 Changwon | 10 m air rifle team |
Commonwealth Games
| Gold medal – first place | Gold Coast 2018 | Women's 10 m Air Rifle |
| Gold medal – first place | Gold Coast 2018 | Women's 50 m Air Rifle Prone |
ISSF World Cup
| Gold medal – first place | 2014 ISSF World Cup | Women's 10 m Air Rifle |
Commonwealth Championships
| Bronze medal – third place | 2017 Brisbane | Women's 10 m air rifle |
| Bronze medal – third place | 2017 Brisbane | Women's 50 m rifle |
Youth Olympic Games
| Silver medal – second place | Nanjing 2014 | Women's 10m Air rifle |

Martina Lindsay Veloso (born October 27, 1999, in Singapore) is a Singaporean sports shooter. She won the gold medal in the 2014 ISSF World Cup in the 10 meters Air Rifle Women event and thus becoming the youngest ISSF shooter in getting one. She has also won the silver medal in 2014 Summer Youth Olympics. She was named Sportsgirl of the Year for 2015 and Sportswoman of the Year for 2019.

== Early life and education ==
Veloso was born to engineer, Melvin Veloso and mother Loresa, who emigrated from the Philippines to Singapore in the 1990s. She has four siblings.

Veloso studied at Nanyang Polytechnic.

== Career ==
Veloso participated in the XX Commonwealth Games in Glasgow, Scotland where she qualified second, with 414.9 points, earning a chance to compete in the finals. In the final she ended up placing fifth, with 143.4 points.

She has won the gold medal in the 2014 ISSF World Cup that took place in Munich, Germany, achievement that made her the youngest medallist in the history of ISSF. To earn the gold medal she scored 206.9 points beating the Olympic champion Katerina Emmons.

Veloso was the youngest shooting competitor in 2014 Summer Youth Olympics, she was only fourteen years old. In the Girls' 10m Air Rifle competition she won the silver medal. She qualified fourth by getting 415,7 points. In the finals, she shot 207.2 to earn the silver medal.

In 2015, at the 2015 ISSF Junior Cup held at Suhl, Germany, she won the bronze medal in 10m Air Rifle Women Junior Competition, and the silver medal in 10m Air Rifle Women Junior Team competition.

In 2017, she won gold medal in Women's 10m Air Rifle at the 2017 Southeast Asian Games in Kuala Lumpur.

In 2018, at the XXI Commonwealth Games held at Gold Coast, Australia, she won gold medal in Women's 10m Air Rifle after had a shoot-off with Mehuli Ghosh, winning the medal in record breaking fashion. She followed it up by breaking another Games Record en route to winning the gold medal in the Women's 50m Air Rifle Prone, scoring 621 points, bettering the previous Games Record of 620.7.
