= Swimming at the 2018 Commonwealth Games =

Swimming competition

- Venue: Gold Coast Aquatic Centre
- Dates: 5–10 April 2018

Swimming at the 2018 Commonwealth Games was the 21st appearance of Swimming at the Commonwealth Games. The swimming events at the 2018 Commonwealth Games were held at the Gold Coast Aquatic Centre in the Gold Coast, Australia from 5 to 10 April. A total of 50 events were scheduled. Of the 50, 38 were for able-bodied athletes (19 per gender). The remaining 12 were for para sport athletes (six per gender).

== Schedule ==
H	Heats	½	Semifinals	F	Final

M = Morning session (starting at 10:30), E = Evening session (starting at 19:30)

Men
Date →	Thu 5		Fri 6		Sat 7		Sun 8		Mon 9		Tue 10	
Event ↓	M	E	M	E	M	E	M	E	M	E	M	E
50 m freestyle									H	½		F
100 m freestyle					H	½		F				
200 m freestyle			H	F								
400 m freestyle	H	F										
1500 m freestyle												F
50 m backstroke					H	½		F				
100 m backstroke	H	½		F								
200 m backstroke									H	F		
50 m breaststroke							H	½		F		
100 m breaststroke			H	½		F						
200 m breaststroke	H	F										
50 m butterfly	H	½		F								
100 m butterfly							H	½		F		
200 m butterfly					H	F						
200 m individual medley											H	F
400 m individual medley			H	F								
4 × 100 m freestyle relay			H	F								
4 × 200 m freestyle relay								F				
4 × 100 m medley relay											H	F
50 m freestyle S7									H	F		
100 m freestyle S9			H	F								
200 m freestyle S14	H	F										
100 m backstroke S9											H	F
100 m breaststroke SB8					H	F						
200 m individual medley SM8							H	F				

Women
Date →	Thu 5		Fri 6		Sat 7		Sun 8		Mon 9		Tue 10	
Event ↓	M	E	M	E	M	E	M	E	M	E	M	E
50 m freestyle			H	½		F						
100 m freestyle							H	½		F		
200 m freestyle	H	F										
400 m freestyle											H	F
800 m freestyle							H			F		
50 m backstroke									H	½		F
100 m backstroke			H	½		F						
200 m backstroke							H	F				
50 m breaststroke	H	½		F								
100 m breaststroke							H	½		F		
200 m breaststroke					H	F						
50 m butterfly					H	½		F				
100 m butterfly	H	½		F								
200 m butterfly									H	F		
200 m individual medley							H	F				
400 m individual medley	H	F										
4 × 100 m freestyle relay		F										
4 × 200 m freestyle relay						F						
4 × 100 m medley relay												F
50 m freestyle S8											H	F
100 m freestyle S9							H	F				
100 m backstroke S9			H	F								
100 m breaststroke SB9									H	F		
50 m butterfly S7	H	F										
200 m individual medley SM10					H	F						

== Medal table ==
* Host nation (Australia)

Rank	Nation	Gold	Silver	Bronze	Total
1	Australia*	28	21	24	73
2	England	9	10	5	24
3	South Africa	6	3	3	12
4	Canada	3	11	6	20
5	New Zealand	2	0	1	3
6	Scotland	1	4	4	9
7	Wales	1	1	3	5
8	Jamaica	0	1	0	1
8	Trinidad and Tobago	0	1	0	1
10	Singapore	0	0	1	1
Totals (10 entries)		50	52	47	149

== Medallists ==
=== Men's events ===
Event	Gold		Silver		Bronze	
50 m freestyle	Ben Proud; England	21.35	Brad Tandy; South Africa	21.81	Cameron McEvoy; Australia	21.92
100 m freestyle	Duncan Scott; Scotland	48.02	Chad le Clos; South Africa Kyle Chalmers; Australia	48.15	Not awarded as there was a tie for silver.	
200 m freestyle	Kyle Chalmers; Australia	1:45.56	Mack Horton; Australia	1:45.89	Duncan Scott; Scotland	1:46.30
400 m freestyle	Mack Horton; Australia	3:43.76	Jack McLoughlin; Australia	3:45.21	James Guy; England	3:45.32
1500 m freestyle	Jack McLoughlin; Australia	14:47.09	Daniel Jervis; Wales	14:48.67	Mack Horton; Australia	14:51.05
50 m backstroke	Mitch Larkin; Australia	24.68	Benjamin Treffers; Australia	24.84	Zac Incerti; Australia	25.06
100 m backstroke	Mitch Larkin; Australia	53.18	Bradley Woodward; Australia	53.95	Markus Thormeyer; Canada	54.14
200 m backstroke	Mitch Larkin; Australia	1:56.10	Bradley Woodward; Australia	1:56.57	Josh Beaver; Australia	1:57.04
50 m breaststroke	Cameron van der Burgh; South Africa	26.58	Adam Peaty; England	26.62	James Wilby; England	27.37
100 m breaststroke	Adam Peaty; England	58.84	James Wilby; England	59.43	Cameron van der Burgh; South Africa	59.44
200 m breaststroke	James Wilby; England	2:08.05	Ross Murdoch; Scotland	2:08.32	Matt Wilson; Australia	2:08.64
50 m butterfly	Chad le Clos; South Africa	23.37	Dylan Carter; Trinidad and Tobago	23.67	Ryan Coetzee; South Africa	23.73
100 m butterfly	Chad le Clos; South Africa	50.65 GR	James Guy; England	51.31	Grant Irvine; Australia	51.50
200 m butterfly	Chad le Clos; South Africa	1:54.00 GR	David Morgan; Australia	1:56.36	Duncan Scott; Scotland	1:56.60
200 m individual medley	Mitch Larkin; Australia	1:57.67 GR	Duncan Scott; Scotland	1:57.86	Clyde Lewis; Australia	1:58.18
400 m individual medley	Clyde Lewis; Australia	4.13.12	Mark Szaranek; Scotland	4.13.72	Lewis Clareburt; New Zealand	4.14.42 NR
4 × 100 m freestyle relay	Australia; Cameron McEvoy (48.91); James Magnussen (48.09); Jack Cartwright (47.71); Kyle Chalmers (48.25); James Roberts^{[a]}	3:12.96	England; David Cumberlidge (49.28); Ben Proud (48.35); Jarvis Parkinson (49.28); James Guy (48.34); Elliot Clogg^{[a]} Cameron Kurle^{[a]}	3:15.25	Scotland; Duncan Scott (48.54); Jack Thorpe (49.48); Kieran McGukin (49.19); Stephen Milne (48.65); Craig McLean^{[a]} Scott McLay^{[a]} Dan Wallace^{[a]}	3:15.86
4 × 200 m freestyle relay	Australia; Alexander Graham (1:46.60); Kyle Chalmers (1:46.47); Elijah Winnington (1:45.97); Mack Horton (1:46.93)	7:05.97 GR	England; Cameron Kurle (1:47.63); Nicholas Grainger (1:47.61); Jarvis Parkinson (1:48.09); James Guy (1:45.24)	7:08.57	Scotland; Stephen Milne (1:48.62); Duncan Scott (1:44.82); Dan Wallace (1:48.69); Mark Szaranek (1:47.76)	7:09.89
4 × 100 m medley relay	Australia; Mitch Larkin (53.14); Jake Packard (59.29); Grant Irvine (51.36); Kyle Chalmers (47.25); Bradley Woodward^{[a]} Matt Wilson^{[a]} David Morgan^{[a]} Jack Cartwright^{[a]}	3:31.04 GR	England; Luke Greenbank (54.61); Adam Peaty (57.64); James Guy (50.95); Ben Proud (47.93); Elliot Clogg^{[a]} James Wilby^{[a]} Jacob Peters^{[a]} David Cumberlidge^{[a]}	3:31.13	South Africa; Calvyn Justus (55.79); Cameron van der Burgh (59.20); Chad le Clos (50.10); Brad Tandy (49.70); Martin Binedell^{[a]} Michael Houlie^{[a]} Ryan Coetzee^{[a]}	3:34.79
AF African record | AM Americas record | AS Asian record | ER European record | OC Oceania record CR Commonwealth record | GR Commonwealth Games record | WR World record | NR National record (Any world record is necessarily also a Commonwealth Games, Commonwealth, area, and national record. Area records (for continental regions) are also national records.)

^{a} Swimmers who participated in the heats only and received medals.

=== Women's events ===
Event	Gold		Silver		Bronze	
50 m freestyle	Cate Campbell; Australia	23.78 CR, OC	Taylor Ruck; Canada Bronte Campbell; Australia	NR 24.26	Not awarded as there was a tie for silver.	
100 m freestyle	Bronte Campbell; Australia	52.27 GR	Cate Campbell; Australia	52.69	Taylor Ruck; Canada	53.08
200 m freestyle	Taylor Ruck; Canada	1:54.81 CR	Ariarne Titmus; Australia	1:54.85	Emma McKeon; Australia	1:56.26
400 m freestyle	Ariarne Titmus; Australia	4:00.93 GR, OC	Holly Hibbott; England	4:05.31	Ellie Faulkner; England	4:07.35
800 m freestyle	Ariarne Titmus; Australia	8:20.02	Jessica Ashwood; Australia	8:27.60	Kiah Melverton; Australia	8:28.59
50 m backstroke	Emily Seebohm; Australia	27.78	Kylie Masse; Canada	27.82	Georgia Davies; Wales	27.90
100 m backstroke	Kylie Masse; Canada	58.63 GR	Emily Seebohm; Australia	58.66	Taylor Ruck; Canada	58.97
200 m backstroke	Kylie Masse; Canada	2:05.98 GR	Taylor Ruck; Canada	2:06.42	Emily Seebohm; Australia	2:06.82
50 m breaststroke	Sarah Vasey; England	30.60	Alia Atkinson; Jamaica	30.76	Leiston Pickett; Australia	30.78
100 m breaststroke	Tatjana Schoenmaker; South Africa	1:06.41 AF	Kierra Smith; Canada	1:07.05	Georgia Bohl; Australia	1:07.22
200 m breaststroke	Tatjana Schoenmaker; South Africa	2:22.02 AF	Molly Renshaw; England	2:23.28	Chloé Tutton; Wales	2:23.42
50 m butterfly	Cate Campbell; Australia	25.59	Holly Barratt; Australia	25.67	Madeline Groves; Australia	25.69
100 m butterfly	Emma McKeon; Australia	56.78 GR	Madeline Groves; Australia	57.19	Brianna Throssell; Australia	57.30
200 m butterfly	Alys Thomas; Wales	2:05.45 GR	Laura Taylor; Australia	2:07.39	Emma McKeon; Australia	2:08.05
200 m individual medley	Siobhan-Marie O'Connor; England	2:09.80	Sarah Darcel; Canada	2:11.14	Erika Seltenreich-Hodgson; Canada	2:11.74
400 m individual medley	Aimee Willmott; England	4:34.90	Hannah Miley; Scotland	4:35.16	Blair Evans; Australia	4:38.23
4 × 100 m freestyle relay	Australia; Shayna Jack (54.03); Bronte Campbell (52.03); Emma McKeon (52.99); Cate Campbell (51.00)	3:30.05 WR	Canada; Alexia Zevnik (53.95); Kayla Sanchez (53.82); Penny Oleksiak (54.33); Taylor Ruck (51.82)	3:33.92	England; Siobhan-Marie O'Connor (54.34); Freya Anderson (54.95); Anna Hopkin (53.82); Ellie Faulkner (55.29)	3:38.40
4 × 200 m freestyle relay	Australia; Emma McKeon (1:56.62); Brianna Throssell (1:57.60); Leah Neale (1:58.23); Ariarne Titmus (1:55.59)	7:48.04 GR	Canada; Penny Oleksiak (1:58.03); Kayla Sanchez (1:59.30); Rebecca Smith (1:57.19); Taylor Ruck (1:55.14)	7:49.66	England; Ellie Faulkner (1:58.75); Siobhan-Marie O'Connor (1:57.07); Freya Anderson (2:00.41); Holly Hibbott (1:59.37)	7:55.60
4 × 100 m medley relay	Australia; Emily Seebohm (59.52); Georgia Bohl (1:06.85); Emma McKeon (56.42); Bronte Campbell (51.57)	3:54.36 GR	Canada; Kylie Masse (59.02); Kierra Smith (1:06.68); Penny Oleksiak (56.86); Taylor Ruck (52.54)	3:55.10	Wales; Georgia Davies (1:00.34); Chloé Tutton (1:07.39); Alys Thomas (57.29); Kathryn Greenslade (55.73)	4:00.75
AF African record | AM Americas record | AS Asian record | ER European record | OC Oceania record CR Commonwealth record | GR Commonwealth Games record | WR World record | NR National record (Any world record is necessarily also a Commonwealth Games, Commonwealth, area, and national record. Area records (for continental regions) are also national records.)

=== Para events ===
==== Men's ====
Event	Gold		Silver		Bronze	
50 m freestyle S7	Matthew Levy; Australia	28.60	Christian Sadie; South Africa	29.65	Toh Wei Soong; Singapore	29.83
100 m freestyle S9	Timothy Disken; Australia	56.07	Lewis White; England	56.77	Brenden Hall; Australia	57.90
200 m freestyle S14	Thomas Hamer; England	1:55.88 WR	Liam Schluter; Australia	1:56.23	Daniel Fox; Australia	1:58.26
100 m backstroke S9	Brenden Hall; Australia	1:04.73	Timothy Hodge; Australia	1:04.99	Logan Powell; Australia	1:05.29
100 m breaststroke SB8	Timothy Disken; Australia	1:12.42	Timothy Hodge; Australia	1:15.80	Blake Cochrane; Australia	1:18.75
200 m individual medley SM8	Jesse Aungles; Australia	2:30.77	Blake Cochrane; Australia	2:32.72	Philippe Vachon; Canada	2:34.03
AF African record | AM Americas record | AS Asian record | ER European record | OC Oceania record CR Commonwealth record | GR Commonwealth Games record | WR World record | NR National record (Any world record is necessarily also a Commonwealth Games, Commonwealth, area, and national record. Area records (for continental regions) are also national records.)

==== Women's ====
Event	Gold		Silver		Bronze	
50 m freestyle S8	Lakeisha Patterson; Australia	30.14	Morgan Bird; Canada	32.03	Abigail Tripp; Canada	32.49
100 m freestyle S9	Lakeisha Patterson; Australia	1:03.02	Alice Tai; England	1:03.07	Ellie Cole; Australia	1:03.36
100 m backstroke S9	Alice Tai; England	1:08.77	Ellie Cole; Australia	1:11.51	Ashleigh McConnell; Australia	1:15.93
100 m breaststroke SB9	Sophie Pascoe; New Zealand	1:18.09	Paige Leonhardt; Australia	1:18.81	Madeleine Scott; Australia	1:19.98
50 m butterfly S7	Ellie Robinson; England	35.72	Sarah Mehain; Canada	37.69	Bronze not awarded	
200 m individual medley SM10	Sophie Pascoe; New Zealand	2:27.72	Aurélie Rivard; Canada	2:31.79	Katherine Downie; Australia	2:31.81
AF African record | AM Americas record | AS Asian record | ER European record | OC Oceania record CR Commonwealth record | GR Commonwealth Games record | WR World record | NR National record (Any world record is necessarily also a Commonwealth Games, Commonwealth, area, and national record. Area records (for continental regions) are also national records.)

=== Records ===
Date	Event	Established for	Time	Name	Nation	Record
5 April	Women's 200m freestyle final	(same)	1:54.81	Taylor Ruck	Canada	CR, GR
5 April	Men's 200m freestyle S14 final	(same)	1:55.88	Thomas Hamer	England	WR
5 April	Women's 100m butterfly semifinal	(same)	57.22	Madeline Groves	Australia	GR
5 April	Women's 4 × 100m freestyle relay final	(same)	3:30.05	Shayna Jack (54.03); Bronte Campbell (52.03); Emma McKeon (52.99); Cate Campbell (51.00)	Australia	WR
6 April	Women's 100m backstroke heats	(same)	58.91	Emily Seebohm	Australia	GR
6 April	Women's 100m backstroke heats	(same)	58.70	Kylie Masse	Canada	GR
6 April	Men's 4 × 100m freestyle relay heats	(same)	3.12.72	Cameron McEvoy (48.63); James Magnussen (47.87); Jack Cartwright (47.74); James Roberts (48.48)	Australia	GR
6 April	Women's 50m freestyle semifinal	(same)	23.88	Cate Campbell	Australia	GR
6 April	Men's 100m breaststroke semifinal	(same)	58.59	Adam Peaty	England	GR
6 April	Women's 100m backstroke semifinal	(same)	58.66	Kylie Masse	Canada	GR
6 April	Women's 100m butterfly final	(same)	56.78	Emma McKeon	Australia	GR
7 April	Men's 200m butterfly final	(same)	1:54.00	Chad le Clos	South Africa	GR
7 April	Men's 100m breaststroke final	Men's 50m breaststroke	26.74	Adam Peaty	England	GR
7 April	Women's 50m freestyle final	(same)	23.78	Cate Campbell	Australia	CR, OC, GR
7 April	Women's 100m backstroke final	(same)	58.63	Kylie Masse	Canada	GR
7 April	Women's 4 × 200m freestyle relay final	(same)	7:48.04	Emma McKeon (1:56.62); Brianna Throssell (1:57.60); Leah Neale (1:58.23); Ariarne Titmus (1:55.59)	Australia	GR
8 April	Women's 200m backstroke final	(same)	2:05.98	Kylie Masse	Canada	GR
8 April	Women's 100m freestyle semifinal	(same)	52.64	Cate Campbell	Australia	GR
8 April	Men's 50m breaststroke semifinal	(same)	26.49	Adam Peaty	England	GR
8 April	Men's 4 × 200m freestyle relay final	(same)	7.05.97	Alexander Graham (1:46.60); Kyle Chalmers (1:46.47); Elijah Winnington (1:45.97); Mack Horton (1:46.93)	Australia	GR
9 April	Men's 50m freestyle heats	(same)	21.45	Ben Proud	England	GR
9 April	Men's 50m freestyle semifinal	(same)	21.30	Ben Proud	England	GR, NR
9 April	Women's 200m butterfly final	(same)	2:05.45	Alys Thomas	Wales	GR
9 April	Women's 100m freestyle final	(same)	52.27	Bronte Campbell	Australia	GR
9 April	Men's 100m butterfly final	(same)	50.65	Chad le Clos	South Africa	GR
10 April	Women's 400m freestyle final	(same)	4:00.93	Ariarne Titmus	Australia	OC, GR
10 April	Men's 200m individual medley final	(same)	1:57.67	Mitch Larkin	Australia	GR
10 April	Women's 4 × 100m medley relay final	(same)	3:54.36	Emily Seebohm (59.52); Georgia Bohl (1:06.85); Emma McKeon (56.42); Bronte Campbell (51.57)	Australia	GR
10 April	Men's 4 × 100m medley relay final	(same)	3:31.04	Mitch Larkin (53.14); Jake Packard (59.29); Grant Irvine (51.36); Kyle Chalmers (47.25)	Australia	GR
AF African record | AM Americas record | AS Asian record | ER European record | OC Oceania record CR Commonwealth record | GR Commonwealth Games record | WR World record | NR National record (Any world record is necessarily also a Commonwealth Games, Commonwealth, area, and national record. Area records (for continental regions) are also national records.)

- Broken Records in Swimming

== Participating nations ==
There are 47 participating nations in swimming with a total of 363 athletes. The number of athletes a nation entered is in parentheses beside the name of the country.

- Antigua and Barbuda (4)
- Australia (70)
- Bahamas (4)
- Bangladesh (3)
- Barbados (1)
- Botswana (1)
- Canada (36)
- Cayman Islands (4)
- Cook Islands (3)
- Cyprus (2)
- England (37)
- Fiji (5)
- Ghana (4)
- Gibraltar (5)
- Guernsey (3)
- Guyana (2)
- Grenada (2)
- India (5)
- Isle of Man (5)
- Jamaica (1)
- Jersey (2)
- Kenya (6)
- Malaysia (7)
- Mauritius (5)
- Mozambique (5)
- New Zealand (17)
- Northern Ireland (9)
- Pakistan (2)
- Papua New Guinea (4)
- Saint Helena (5)
- Saint Lucia (2)
- Saint Vincent and the Grenadines (4)
- Samoa (3)
- Scotland (25)
- Seychelles (5)
- Sierra Leone (2)
- Singapore (5)
- Solomon Islands (2)
- South Africa (25)
- Sri Lanka (6)
- Tanzania (1)
- Tonga (2)
- Trinidad and Tobago (1)
- Tuvalu (1)
- Uganda (2)
- Wales (14)
- Zambia (4)
