= Swimming at the 2018 Commonwealth Games – Men's 50 metre butterfly =

Men's 50 metre butterfly at the 2018 Commonwealth Games
- Venue: Gold Coast Aquatic Centre
- Dates: 5 April (heats, semifinals); 6 April (final)
- Competitors: 56 from 33 nations
- Winning time: 23.37

Medalists
gold medal	Chad le Clos	South Africa
silver medal	Dylan Carter	Trinidad and Tobago
bronze medal	Ryan Coetzee	South Africa

The men's 50 metre butterfly event at the 2018 Commonwealth Games was held on 5 and 6 April at the Gold Coast Aquatic Centre.

== Records ==
Prior to this competition, the existing world, Commonwealth and Games records were as follows:

World record	Rafael Muñoz (ESP)	22.43	Málaga, Spain	5 April 2009
Commonwealth record	Matt Targett (AUS)	22.73	Rome, Italy	27 July 2009
Games record	Benjamin Proud (ENG)	22.93	Glasgow, United Kingdom	25 July 2014

== Schedule ==
The schedule is as follows:

All times are Australian Eastern Standard Time (UTC+10)

Date	Time	Round
Thursday 5 April 2018	11:23	Qualifying
Thursday 5 April 2018	20:52	Semifinals
Friday 6 April 2018	19:37	Final

== Results ==
=== Heats ===
Rank	Heat	Lane	Name	Nationality	Time	Notes
1	7	5	Chad Le Clos	South Africa	23.53	Q
2	6	4	Dylan Carter	Trinidad and Tobago	23.62	Q
3	5	5	Ryan Coetzee	South Africa	23.94	Q
4	6	3	Grant Irvine	Australia	23.95	Q
5	6	6	Daniel Hunter	New Zealand	24.01	Q
6	7	3	Jacob Peters	England	24.19	Q
7	5	4	David Morgan	Australia	24.21	Q
8	1	8	Sam Perry	New Zealand	24.23	Q
9	7	6	Sean Campsie	Scotland	24.32	Q
10	5	7	Bradley Tandy	South Africa	24.41	Q
11	5	2	Calum Bain	Northern Ireland	24.45	Q
12	6	2	Scott McLay	Scotland	24.49	Q
13	5	6	Virdhawal Khade	India	24.52	Q
14	7	2	Josiah Binnema	Canada	24.57	Q
15	7	7	Ralph Goveia	Zambia	24.62	Q
16	5	3	Abeiku Jackson	Ghana	24.68	Q
17	6	7	Miles Munro	Guernsey	24.76	
18	4	4	David Thompson	Northern Ireland	24.77	
19	7	8	Mackenzie Darragh	Canada	24.81	
20	7	1	Darren Lim	Singapore	24.86	
21	5	1	Sajan Prakash	India	25.11	
22	6	5	Cherantha de Silva	Sri Lanka	25.13	
23	5	8	Jie Chan	Malaysia	25.20	
24	4	6	Igor Mogne	Mozambique	25.23	
25	4	3	Keith Kit Sern Lim	Malaysia	25.25	
26	4	2	Bradley Vincent	Mauritius	25.30	
27	6	1	Akalanka Peiris	Sri Lanka	25.32	
28	6	8	N'Nhyn Fernander	Bahamas	25.39	
29	4	8	Curtis Coulter	Northern Ireland	25.53	
30	4	5	Issa Mohamed	Kenya	25.77	
31	4	7	Samuel Seghers	Papua New Guinea	25.81	
32	4	1	Iain McCallum	Cayman Islands	25.99	
33	3	6	Steven Maina	Kenya	26.02	
34	3	4	Erico Cuna	Mozambique	26.11	
35	3	2	Hilal Hilal	Tanzania	26.32	
36	3	8	Epeli Rabua Herbert	Fiji	26.33	
37	3	5	Stefano Mitchell	Antigua and Barbuda	26.43	
38	3	3	Md Nahid	Bangladesh	26.56	
39	3	1	Matt Savitz	Gibraltar	26.85	
40	2	2	Paul Elaisa	Fiji	26.94	
41	3	7	James Sanderson	Gibraltar	26.95	
42	2	4	Gregory Anodin	Mauritius	27.09	
43	1	4	Joshua Tibatemwa	Uganda	27.17	
44	2	8	Andrew Fowler	Guyana	27.23	
45	2	1	Josh Tarere	Papua New Guinea	27.43	
46	2	5	Jadon Wuilliez	Antigua and Barbuda	27.78	
47	2	6	Nikolas Sylvester	Saint Vincent and the Grenadines	27.93	
47	1	5	Dillon Gooding	Saint Vincent and the Grenadines	27.93	
49	2	7	Moonakala Kumaren	Zambia	27.96	
50	1	7	Finau Ohuafi	Tonga	28.00	
51	1	6	Alexander Cyrus	Saint Vincent and the Grenadines	28.12	
52	1	3	Ashley Seeto	Papua New Guinea	28.33	
53	1	1	Ishmael Koroma	Sierra Leone	28.73	
54	1	2	Ben Dillon	Saint Helena	29.71	
	2	3	Adam Moncherry	Seychelles	DSQ	
	7	4	Benjamin Proud	England	DSQ	

=== Semifinals ===
Rank	Heat	Lane	Name	Nationality	Time	Notes
1	2	4	Chad Le Clos	South Africa	23.53	Q
2	1	5	Grant Irvine	Australia	23.79	Q
2	2	5	Ryan Coetzee	South Africa	23.79	Q
4	1	4	Dylan Carter	Trinidad and Tobago	23.90	Q
5	2	3	Daniel Hunter	New Zealand	23.93	Q
6	1	6	Sam Perry	New Zealand	23.99	Q
7	1	3	Jacob Peters	England	24.05	Q
8	2	6	David Morgan	Australia	24.17	Q
9	1	1	Josiah Binnema	Canada	24.30	
10	1	2	Bradley Tandy	South Africa	24.35	
11	2	7	Calum Bain	Northern Ireland	24.43	
12	2	2	Sean Campsie	Scotland	24.48	
13	1	7	Scott McLay	Scotland	24.49	
14	2	8	Ralph Goveia	Zambia	24.49	
15	2	1	Virdhawal Khade	India	24.50	
16	1	8	Abeiku Jackson	Ghana	24.86	

=== Final ===
Rank	Lane	Name	Nationality	Time	Notes
1st place, gold medalist(s)	4	Chad Le Clos	South Africa	23.37	
2nd place, silver medalist(s)	6	Dylan Carter	Trinidad and Tobago	23.67	
3rd place, bronze medalist(s)	3	Ryan Coetzee	South Africa	23.73	
4	5	Grant Irvine	Australia	23.76	
5	2	Daniel Hunter	New Zealand	23.87	
6	7	Sam Perry	New Zealand	23.96	
7	1	Jacob Peters	England	24.00	
8	8	David Morgan	Australia	24.01	
