= Swimming at the 2018 Commonwealth Games – Men's 100 metre butterfly =

Men's 100 metre butterfly at the 2018 Commonwealth Games
- Venue: Gold Coast Aquatic Centre
- Dates: 8 April (heats, semifinals); 9 April (final)
- Competitors: 28 from 21 nations
- Winning time: 50.65

Medalists
gold medal	Chad le Clos	South Africa
silver medal	James Guy	England
bronze medal	Grant Irvine	Australia

The men's 100 metre butterfly event at the 2018 Commonwealth Games was held on 8 and 9 April at the Gold Coast Aquatic Centre.

== Records ==
Prior to this competition, the existing world, Commonwealth and Games records were as follows:

World record	Michael Phelps (USA)	49.82	Rome, Italy	1 August 2009
Commonwealth record	Joseph Schooling (SGP)	50.39	Rio de Janeiro, Brazil	12 August 2016
Games record	Chad le Clos (RSA)	51.29	Glasgow, United Kingdom	28 July 2014

The following records were established during the competition:

Date	Event	Name	Nationality	Time	Record
9 April	Final	Chad le Clos	South Africa	50.65	GR

== Results ==
=== Heats ===
The heats were held on 8 April at 11:35.

Rank	Heat	Lane	Name	Nationality	Time	Notes
1	4	4	James Guy	England	53.16	Q
2	2	3	Sean Campsie	Scotland	53.31	Q
3	4	3	Josiah Binnema	Canada	53.49	Q
3	4	5	David Morgan	Australia	53.49	Q
5	2	4	Chad Le Clos	South Africa	53.67	Q
6	2	5	Jacob Peters	England	53.72	Q
7	2	6	Mackenzie Darragh	Canada	53.81	Q
8	3	4	Grant Irvine	Australia	53.89	Q
9	3	6	Sajan Prakash	India	54.11	Q
10	3	3	Calum Jarvis	Wales	54.26	Q
11	4	2	Jie Chan	Malaysia	54.33	Q
12	3	2	Ralph Goveia	Zambia	54.58	Q
13	3	1	Abeiku Jackson	Ghana	54.79	Q
14	3	5	Ryan Coetzee	South Africa	55.03	Q
15	2	2	Eben Vorster	South Africa	55.11	Q
16	4	1	James Brown	Northern Ireland	55.14	Q
17	3	7	Igor Mogne	Mozambique	55.20	
18	4	6	Cherantha de Silva	Sri Lanka	55.91	
19	3	8	Harry Shalamon	Jersey	56.24	
20	4	7	Curtis Coulter	Northern Ireland	56.57	
21	2	1	Mohammad Nahid	Bangladesh	56.94	
22	4	8	Iain McCallum	Cayman Islands	58.08	
23	2	8	Stefano Mitchell	Antigua and Barbuda	58.88	
24	1	3	Epeli Rabua Herbert	Fiji	58.91	
25	1	4	Matt Savitz	Gibraltar	59.56	
26	1	6	Gregory Anodin	Mauritius	1:00.98	
27	1	5	James Sanderson	Gibraltar	1:02.14	
28	1	2	Dillon Gooding	Saint Vincent and the Grenadines	1:04.05	
	2	7	N'Nhyn Fernander	Bahamas	DNS	

=== Semifinals ===
The semifinals were held on 8 April at 20:53.

==== Semifinal 1 ====
Rank	Lane	Name	Nationality	Time	Notes
1	6	Grant Irvine	Australia	51.87	Q
2	5	David Morgan	Australia	52.48	Q
3	2	Calum Jarvis	Wales	53.33	Q
4	4	Sean Campsie	Scotland	53.40	Q
4	3	Jacob Peters	England	53.40	Q
6	7	Ralph Goveia	Zambia	54.10	
7	1	Ryan Coetzee	South Africa	54.17	
8	8	James Brown	Northern Ireland	55.13	

==== Semifinal 2 ====
Rank	Lane	Name	Nationality	Time	Notes
1	4	James Guy	England	52.34	Q
2	3	Chad Le Clos	South Africa	52.56	Q
3	5	Josiah Binnema	Canada	53.41	Q
4	6	Mackenzie Darragh	Canada	53.43	
5	2	Sajan Prakash	India	54.12	
6	7	Jie Chan	Malaysia	54.56	
7	8	Eben Vorster	South Africa	54.75	
8	1	Abeiku Jackson	Ghana	54.79	

=== Final ===
The final was held on 9 April at 21:59.

Rank	Lane	Name	Nationality	Time	Notes
1st place, gold medalist(s)	6	Chad Le Clos	South Africa	50.65	GR
2nd place, silver medalist(s)	5	James Guy	England	51.31	
3rd place, bronze medalist(s)	4	Grant Irvine	Australia	51.50	
4	3	David Morgan	Australia	51.94	
5	8	Josiah Binnema	Canada	53.11	
5	1	Jacob Peters	England	53.11	
7	2	Calum Jarvis	Wales	53.36	
8	7	Sean Campsie	Scotland	53.51	
