= South Africa at the 2018 Commonwealth Games =

- Flag of South Africa
- CG code: RSA
- CGA: South African Sports Confederation and Olympic Committee
- Website: sascoc.co.za

in Gold Coast, Australia 4 April 2018 – 15 April 2018
- Competitors: 194 in 17 sports
- Flag bearer: Caster Semenya
- Medals Ranked 6th: Gold 13 Silver 11 Bronze 13 Total 37

Commonwealth Games appearances (overview)
- 1930; 1934; 1938; 1950; 1954; 1958; 1962–1990; 1994; 1998; 2002; 2006; 2010; 2014; 2018; 2022; 2026; 2030

South Africa competed at the 2018 Commonwealth Games in the Gold Coast, Australia from April 4 to April 15, 2018.

Track and field athlete Caster Semenya was the country's flag bearer during the opening ceremony.

== Competitors ==
The following is the list of number of competitors participating at the Games per sport/discipline.

Sport	Men	Women	Total
Athletics	24	4	28
Badminton	3	3	6
Boxing	2	0	2
Cycling	10	7	17
Diving	0	3	3
Field hockey	18	18	36
Gymnastics	0	4	4
Lawn bowls	10	7	17
Netball	—N/a	12	12
Powerlifting	1	0	1
Rugby sevens	13	12	25
Shooting	4	0	4
Swimming	14	11	25
Table tennis	1	0	1
Triathlon	3	2	5
Weightlifting	0	3	3
Wrestling	5	0	5
Total	108	86	194

== Medalists ==
Medal	Name	Sport	Event	Date
Gold	Henri Schoeman	Triathlon	Men's triathlon	April 5
Gold	Chad le Clos	Swimming	Men's 50 metre butterfly	April 6
Gold	Chad le Clos	Swimming	Men's 200 metre butterfly	April 7
Gold	Tatjana Schoenmaker	Swimming	Women's 200 metre breaststroke	April 7
Gold	Cameron van der Burgh	Swimming	Men's 50 metre breaststroke	April 9
Gold	Tatjana Schoenmaker	Swimming	Women's 100 metre breaststroke	April 9
Gold	Chad le Clos	Swimming	Men's 100 metre butterfly	April 9
Gold	Akani Simbine	Athletics	Men's 100 metres	April 9
Gold	Caster Semenya	Athletics	Women's 1500 metres	April 10
Gold	Luvo Manyonga	Athletics	Men's long jump	April 11
Gold	Ndodomzi Ntutu	Athletics	Men's T12 100 metres	April 12
Gold	Martin Erasmus	Wrestling	Men's freestyle 97 kg	April 13
Gold	Caster Semenya	Athletics	Women's 800 metres	April 13
Silver	Chad le Clos	Swimming	Men's 100 metre freestyle	April 8
Silver	Elma Davis; Esme Kruger; Nicolene Neal; Johanna Snyman	Lawn bowls	Women's fours	April 9
Silver	Dyan Buis	Athletics	Men's T38 100 metres	April 9
Silver	Christian Sadie	Swimming	Men's 50 metre freestyle S7	April 9
Silver	Henricho Bruintjies	Athletics	Men's 100 metres	April 9
Silver	Brad Tandy	Swimming	Men's 50 metre freestyle	April 10
Silver	Nozipho Schroeder; Philippus Walker	Lawn bowls	Mixed para-sport pairs	April 11
Silver	Johannes Botha	Wrestling	Men's freestyle 74 kg	April 12
Silver	Hilton Langenhoven	Athletics	Men's T12 100 metres	April 12
Silver	Nicolene Neal; Colleen Piketh	Lawn bowls	Women's pairs	April 13
Silver	Henricho Bruintjies; Emile Erasmus; Anaso Jobodwana; Akani Simbine	Athletics	Men's 4 × 100 metres relay	April 14
Bronze	Ryan Coetzee	Swimming	Men's 50 metre butterfly	April 6
Bronze	Mona Pretorius	Weightlifting	Women's 63 kg	April 7
Bronze	Cameron van der Burgh	Swimming	Men's 100 metre breaststroke	April 7
Bronze	Colleen Piketh	Lawn bowls	Women's singles	April 8
Bronze	Charl du Toit	Athletics	Men's T38 100 metres	April 9
Bronze	Calvyn Justus; Cameron van der Burgh; Chad le Clos; Brad Tandy	Swimming	Men's 4 × 100 metre medley relay	April 10
Bronze	Sunette Viljoen	Athletics	Women's javelin throw	April 11
Bronze	Ruswahl Samaai	Athletics	Men's long jump	April 11
Bronze	Reinhardt Hamman	Athletics	Men's F38 shot put	April 11
Bronze	Christopher Patton; Tobias Botha; Willem Viljoen	Lawn bowls	Open para-sport triples	April 12
Bronze	Alan Hatherly	Cycling	Men's cross-country	April 12
Bronze	Wenda Nel	Athletics	Women's 400 metres hurdles	April 12
Bronze	Clint Hendricks	Cycling	Men's road race	April 14

Medals by sport
Sport	1st place, gold medalist(s)	2nd place, silver medalist(s)	3rd place, bronze medalist(s)	Total
Athletics	5	4	5	14
Cycling	0	0	2	2
Lawn bowls	0	3	2	5
Swimming	6	3	3	12
Triathlon	1	0	0	1
Weightlifting	0	0	1	1
Wrestling	1	1	0	2
Total	13	11	13	37

Medals by date
Day	Date	1st place, gold medalist(s)	2nd place, silver medalist(s)	3rd place, bronze medalist(s)	Total
1	5 April	1	0	0	1
2	6 April	1	0	1	2
3	7 April	2	0	2	4
4	8 April	0	1	1	2
5	9 April	4	4	1	9
6	10 April	1	1	1	3
7	11 April	1	1	3	5
8	12 April	1	2	3	6
9	13 April	2	1	0	3
10	14 April	0	1	1	2
Total		13	11	13	37

Medals by gender
Gender	1st place, gold medalist(s)	2nd place, silver medalist(s)	3rd place, bronze medalist(s)	Total
Female	4	2	4	10
Male	9	8	9	26
Mixed	0	1	0	1
Total	13	11	13	37

== Athletics ==
Men
Track & road events

Athlete	Event	Heat		Semifinal		Final	
Athlete	Event	Result	Rank	Result	Rank	Result	Rank
Henricho Bruintjies	100 m	10.23	5 Q	10.26	8 Q	10.17	2nd place, silver medalist(s)
Akani Simbine	100 m	10.21	4 Q	10.12	4 Q	10.03	1st place, gold medalist(s)
Hilton Langenhoven	100 m T12	11.27 =SB	4 Q	—N/a		11.27 =SB	2nd place, silver medalist(s)
Ndodomzi Ntutu	100 m T12	10.80 GR SB	1 Q	—N/a		11.02	1st place, gold medalist(s)
Dyan Buis	100 m T38	—N/a				11.33 SB	2nd place, silver medalist(s)
Charl du Toit	100 m T38	—N/a				11.35 WR	3rd place, bronze medalist(s)
Union Sekailwe	100 m T38	—N/a				11.67 SB	5
Anaso Jobodwana	200 m	20.89	16 Q	DQ		Did not advance	
Clarence Munyai	200 m	20.95	17 Q	20.36	2 Q	20.58	4
Stephen Mokoka	10000 m	—N/a				27:44.58 SB	6
Antonio Alkana	110 m hurdles	13.32	3 Q	—N/a		13.49	5
Constant Pretorius	400 m hurdles	49.71	9	Did not advance			
L.J. van Zyl	400 m hurdles	50.98	17	Did not advance			
Henricho Bruintjies; Emile Erasmus; Anaso Jobodwana; Akani Simbine	4 × 100 m	38.71	4 Q	—N/a		38.24 NR	2nd place, silver medalist(s)
Lebogang Shange	20 km walk	—N/a				1:23:27	9
Wayne Snyman	20 km walk	—N/a				1:28:09	14

Field events

Athlete	Event	Qualification		Final	
Athlete	Event	Distance	Rank	Distance	Rank
Luvo Manyonga	Long jump	7.91	6 Q	8.41 GR	1st place, gold medalist(s)
Ruswahl Samaai	Long jump	8.06	2 Q	8.22	3rd place, bronze medalist(s)
Breyton Poole	High jump	2.18	15	Did not advance	
Orazio Cremona	Shot put	19.24	7 Q	20.51	6
Reinhardt Hamman	Shot put F38	—N/a		13.15 SB	3rd place, bronze medalist(s)
Juanre Jenkinson	Shot put F38	—N/a		9.63	8
Phil-Mar van Rensburg	Javelin throw	78.00	7 Q	79.83	4
Tshepang Makhethe	Hammer throw	—N/a		67.99	9

Women
Track & road events

Athlete	Event	Heat		Semifinal		Final	
Athlete	Event	Result	Rank	Result	Rank	Result	Rank
Caster Semenya	800 m	1:59.26	1 Q	—N/a		1:56.68 GR	1st place, gold medalist(s)
Caster Semenya	1500 m	4:05.86	1 Q	—N/a		4:00.71 GR NR	1st place, gold medalist(s)
Wenda Nel	400 m hurdles	54.61	2 Q	—N/a		54.96	3rd place, bronze medalist(s)

Field events

Athlete	Event	Final	
Athlete	Event	Distance	Rank
Juanelie Meijer	Long jump T38	4.19	4
Sunette Viljoen	Javelin throw	62.08	3rd place, bronze medalist(s)

== Badminton ==
A team of 6 badminton players (3 men and 3 women) will be sent to the games.

Singles

Athlete	Event	Round of 64	Round of 32	Round of 16	Quarterfinal	Semifinal	Final / BM	
Athlete	Event	Opposition Score	Opposition Score	Opposition Score	Opposition Score	Opposition Score	Opposition Score	Rank
Cameron Coetzer	Men's singles	E Ekiring (UGA); L 0-2	Did not advance					
Prakash Vijayanath	Men's singles	B Molia (FIJ); W 2-0	J Paul (MRI); L 0-2	Did not advance				
Bongani von Bodenstein	Men's singles	L K Yew (SGP); L 0-2	Did not advance					
Michelle Butler-Emmett	Women's singles	—N/a	G Chua (SGP); L 0-2	Did not advance				
Elsie de Villiers	Women's singles	—N/a	S Nehwal (IND); L 0-2	Did not advance				
Johanita Scholtz	Women's singles	C Birch (ENG); L 0-2	Did not advance					

Doubles

Athlete	Event	Round of 64	Round of 32	Round of 16	Quarterfinal	Semifinal	Final / BM	
Athlete	Event	Opposition Score	Opposition Score	Opposition Score	Opposition Score	Opposition Score	Opposition Score	Rank
Cameron Coetzer; Prakash Vijayanath	Men's doubles	—N/a	E Donkor (GHA); D Sam (GHA); L 1-2	Did not advance				
Michelle Butler-Emmett; Elsie de Villiers	Women's doubles	—N/a	Z Morris (FAI); C March (FAI); W 2-0	T Hendahewa (SRI); K Sirimannage (SRI); L 0-2	Did not advance			
Michelle Butler-Emmett; Cameron Coetzer	Mixed doubles	A Lubah (MRI); N Chan-Lam (MRI); W 2-1	N Yakura (CAN); K Tsai (CAN); L 0-2	Did not advance				
Elsie de Villiers; Bongani von Bodenstein	Mixed doubles	—N/a	D Chrisnanta (SGP); C Wong (SGP); L 0-2	Did not advance				
Johanita Scholtz; Prakash Vijayanath	Mixed doubles	C Mulenga (ZAM); E Siamupangila (ZAM); W 2-0	T Hee (SGP); W Tan (SGP); L 0-2	Did not advance				

Mixed team

Roster

- Michelle Butler-Emmett
- Cameron Coetzer
- Elsie de Villiers
- Johanita Scholtz
- Prakash Vijayanath
- Bongani von Bodenstein

Pool C

Pos	Team	Pld	W	L	MF	MA	MD	GF	GA	GD	PF	PA	PD	Pts	Qualification
1	England	3	3	0	15	0	+15	30	0	+30	630	345	+285	3	Knockout stage
2	Australia	3	2	1	9	6	+3	19	12	+7	576	472	+104	2	Knockout stage
3	South Africa	3	1	2	3	12	−9	6	24	−18	410	592	−182	1	
4	Uganda	3	0	3	3	12	−9	6	25	−19	406	613	−207	0	

Updated to match(es) played on 6 April 2018. Source: GC2018

Australia
5
Carrara Sports and Leisure Centre, Gold Coast
5 April

South Africa
0

			1	2	3
1	(Australia) (South Africa)	Anthony Joe; Prakash Vijayanath	24; 22	22; 20
2	(Australia) (South Africa)	Wendy Chen Hsuan-yu; Johanita Scholtz	21; 5	21; 13
3	(Australia) (South Africa)	Sawan Serasinghe / Matthew Chau; Cameron Coetzer / Bongani von Bodenstein	21; 8	21; 12
4	(Australia) (South Africa)	Setyana Mapasa / Gronya Somerville; Michelle Butler-Emmett / Elsie de Villers	21; 6	21; 13
5	(Australia) (South Africa)	Sawan Serasinghe / Setyana Mapasa; Prakash Vijayanath / Michelle Butler-Emmett	21; 8	21; 17

England
5
Carrara Sports and Leisure Centre, Gold Coast
6 April

South Africa
0

			1	2	3
1	(England) (South Africa)	Ben Lane / Jessica Pugh; Prakash Vijayanath / Michelle Butler-Emmett	21; 12	21; 15
2	(England) (South Africa)	Rajiv Ouseph; Bongani von Bodenstein	21; 7	21; 7
3	(England) (South Africa)	Chloe Birch; Johanita Scholtz	21; 10	21; 10
4	(England) (South Africa)	Chris Adcock / Ben Lane; Cameron Coetzer / Bongani von Bodenstein	21; 7	21; 6
5	(England) (South Africa)	Sarah Walker / Lauren Smith; Michelle Butler-Emmett / Elsie de Velliers	21; 12	21; 17

South Africa
3
Carrara Sports and Leisure Centre, Gold Coast
6 April

Uganda
2

			1	2	3
1	(South Africa) (Uganda)	Prakash Vijayanath / Michelle Butler-Emmett; Brian Kasirye / Aisha Nakiyemba	21; 16	21; 15
2	(South Africa) (Uganda)	Bongani von Bodenstein; Edwin Ekiring	13; 21	11; 21
3	(South Africa) (Uganda)	Johanita Scholtz; Shamim Bangi	13; 21	20; 22
4	(South Africa) (Uganda)	Prakash Vijayanath / Cameron Coetzer; Edwin Ekiring / Brian Kasirye	21; 16	21; 16
5	(South Africa) (Uganda)	Michelle Butler-Emmett / Elsie de Villiers; Aisha Nakiyemba / Shamim Bangi	21; 10	21; 10

== Boxing ==
South Africa participated with a team of 2 athletes (2 men).

Men

Athlete	Event	Round of 16	Quarterfinals	Semifinals	Final	Rank
Athlete	Event	Opposition Result	Opposition Result	Opposition Result	Opposition Result	Rank
Siyabulela Mphongoshi	−49 kg	Thiwanka Ranasinghe (SRI); L 0–4	Did not advance			
Sinethemba Blom	−64 kg	Colin Lewis (GUY); W 4-1	Jesse Lartey (GHA); L 2-3	Did not advance		

== Cycling ==
South Africa participated with 17 athletes (10 men and 7 women).

=== Road ===
Men

Athlete	Event	Time	Rank
Brendon Davids	Road race	3:57:58	18
Nicholas Dlamini	Road race	3:59:39	38
Clint Hendricks	Road race	3:57:01	3rd place, bronze medalist(s)
Nolan Hoffman	Road race	DNF	
Bradley Potgieter	Road race	3:59:08	27
Brendon Davids	Time trial	51:44.00	10
Nicholas Dlamini	Time trial	DNS	

=== Track ===
Pursuit

Athlete	Event	Qualification		Final	
Athlete	Event	Time	Rank	Opponent Results	Rank
Gert Fouche	Men's pursuit	4:35.783	21	Did not advance	
Steven van Heerden	Men's pursuit	4:32.921	19	Did not advance	
Joshua van Wyk	Men's pursuit	4:43.335	26	Did not advance	
Gert Fouche; Nolan Hoffman; David Maree; Steven van Heerden; Joshua van Wyk	Men's team pursuit	4:11.711	5	Did not advance	
Charlene Du Preez	Women's pursuit	3:45.764	18	Did not advance	
Danielle van Niekerk	Women's pursuit	4:03.570	21	Did not advance	
Ilze Bole	Women's pursuit	3:53.312	19	Did not advance	
Ilze Bole; Charlene Du Preez; Adelia Reyneke; Danielle van Niekerk; Elfriede Wolfaardt	Women's team pursuit	4:51.224	6	Did not advance	

Points race

Athlete	Event	Qualification		Final	
Athlete	Event	Points	Rank	Points	Rank
Nolan Hoffman	Men's point race	12	8 Q	DNF	
David Maree	Men's point race	5	10 Q	DNF	
Steven van Heerden	Men's point race	23	6 Q	0	18

Scratch race

Athlete	Event	Qualification	Final
Nolan Hoffman	Men's scratch race	15	Did not advance
David Maree	Men's scratch race	8 Q	13
Joshua van Wyk	Men's scratch race	DNF	Did not advance

=== Mountain bike ===
Athlete	Event	Time	Rank
Alan Hatherly	Men's cross-country	1:17:56	3rd place, bronze medalist(s)
Cherie Redecker	Women's cross-country	-1LAP	
Mariske Strauss	Women's cross-country	1:22:50	7

== Diving ==
South Africa participated with a team of 3 athletes (3 women).

Women

Athlete	Event	Preliminaries		Final	
Athlete	Event	Points	Rank	Points	Rank
Micaela Bouter	1 m springboard	230.75	11 Q	217.25	10
Nicole Gillis	1 m springboard	231.90	10 Q	210.95	11
Julia Vincent	1 m springboard	260.95	3 Q	247.4	4
Micaela Bouter	3 m springboard	213.70	14	Did not advance	
Nicole Gillis	3 m springboard	221.15	13	Did not advance	
Julia Vincent	3 m springboard	229.50	11 Q	291.45	6
Micaela Bouter; Nicole Gillis	3 m synchronised springboard	—N/a		238.80	6

== Gymnastics ==
=== Artistic ===
South Africa participated with 2 athletes (2 women).

Women
Individual Qualification

Athlete	Event	Apparatus				Total	Rank
Athlete	Event	V	UB	BB	F	Total	Rank
Claudia Cummins	Qualification	13.400	11.775	9.700	11.150	46.025	16
Naveen Daries	Qualification	12.950	11.700	10.400	10.300	45.350	18

=== Rhythmic ===
South Africa participated with 2 athletes (2 women).

Team Final & Individual Qualification

Athlete	Event	Apparatus				Total	Rank
Athlete	Event	Hoop	Ball	Clubs	Ribbon	Total	Rank
Grace Legote	Qualification	9.100	11.700 Q	11.350	10.500	42.650	18 Q
Chris-Marie van Wyk	Qualification	8.950	8.850	10.200	7.200	35.200	21 Q

Individual Finals

Athlete	Event	Apparatus				Total	Rank
Athlete	Event	Hoop	Ball	Clubs	Ribbon	Total	Rank
Grace Legote	All-Around	8.650	11.500	11.350	11.400	42.900	13
Grace Legote	Ball	—N/a	12.150	—N/a		12.170	7
Chris-Marie van Wyk	All-Around	10.000	8.500	9.650	8.400	36.550	16

== Hockey ==
Both the men and women Hockey teams has qualified for the games. This comes as both teams are the African Champions. A total of 36 individuals are included.

=== Men's tournament ===
Roster

- Daniel Bell
- Dayaan Cassiem
- Ryan Crowe
- Tyson Dlungwana
- Tim Drummond
- Jethro Eustice
- Gowan Jones
- Ryan Julius
- Gareth Heyns
- Keenan Horne
- Tevin Kok
- Owen Mvimbi
- Siyavuya Nolutshungu
- Nqobile Ntuli
- Clinton Panther
- Reza Rosenberg
- Daniel Sibbald
- Austin Smith

Pool A

Pos	Team	Pld	W	D	L	GF	GA	GD	Pts	Qualification
1	Australia (H)	4	4	0	0	16	2	+14	12	Advance to Semi-finals
2	New Zealand	4	3	0	1	18	6	+12	9	Advance to Semi-finals
3	Scotland	4	1	0	3	7	14	−7	3	5th–6th place match
4	Canada	4	1	0	3	3	12	−9	3	7th–8th place match
5	South Africa	4	1	0	3	4	14	−10	3	9th–10th place match

Source: FIH
Rules for classification: 1) points; 2) number of wins; 3) goal difference; 4) goals scored; 5) head-to-head results.
(H) Hosts

5 April 2018
21:30

South Africa	2–4	Scotland
Heyns 37'; Drummond 43'	Report	Harwood 6'; Bain 13', 46'; Forsyth 14'

Umpires:
Eric Koh (MAS)
Jamie Hooper (GBR)

7 April 2018
16:30

Australia	4–0	South Africa
Mitton 30', 39'; Hayward 43'; Kleinschmidt 50'	Report

Umpires:
Anbananthan Rawi (MAS)
Tyler Klenk (CAN)

8 April 2018
16:30

New Zealand	6–0	South Africa
Russell 4', 25'; J. Panchia 26'; Woods 27'; Muir 50'; Ross 53'	Report

Umpires:
Jamie Hooper (WAL)
Paul Walker (ENG)

11 April 2018
21:30

Canada	0–2	South Africa
	Report	Julius 31'; Rosenberg 60'

Umpires:
Jamie Hooper (WAL)
Tim Bond (NZL)

Ninth and tenth place

13 April 2018
08:30

South Africa	2–3	Wales
Crowe 19'; Cassiem 46'	Report	Furlong 27'; Carson 27', 59'

Umpires:
Ben de Young (AUS)
Tyler Klenk (CAN)

=== Women's tournament ===
Roster

- Stephanie Baxter
- Quanita Bobbs
- Kara-Lee Botes
- Dirkie Chamberlain
- Sulette Damons
- Illse Davids
- Lisa-Marie Deetlefs
- Celia Evans
- Erin Hunter
- Shelly Jones
- Nicole La Fleur
- Ongeziwe Mali
- Candice Manuel
- Jade Mayne
- Phumelela Mbande
- Kristen Paton
- Nicolene Terblanche
- Nicole Walraven

Pool A

Pos	Team	Pld	W	D	L	GF	GA	GD	Pts	Qualification
1	England	4	3	0	1	11	3	+8	9	Advance to Semi-finals
2	India	4	3	0	1	9	5	+4	9	Advance to Semi-finals
3	South Africa	4	1	1	2	3	4	−1	4	5th–6th place match
4	Malaysia	4	1	1	2	3	8	−5	4	7th–8th place match
5	Wales	4	1	0	3	4	10	−6	3	9th–10th place match

Source: FIH
Rules for classification: 1) points; 2) number of wins; 3) goal difference; 4) goals scored; 5) head-to-head results.

5 April 2018
14:30

England	2–0	South Africa
Balsdon 11'; Townsend 20'	Report

Umpires:
Sarah Wilson (GBR)
Nur Hafizah Azman (MAS)

7 April 2018
19:30

South Africa	1–1	Malaysia
Mayne 47'	Report	Nuraslinda 39'

Umpires:
Catherine Wright (WAL)
Lelia Sacre (CAN)

9 April 2018
14:30

South Africa	2–0	Wales
Manuel 25'; Mayne 41'	Report

Umpires:
Emma Shelbourn (ENG)
Jo Cumming (NZL)

10 April 2018
19:30

India	1–0	South Africa
Rampal 47'	Report

Umpires:
Sarah Wilson (SCO)
Catherine Wright (WAL)

Fifth and sixth place

13 April 2018
14:00

South Africa	1–3	Canada
Manuel 55'	Report	Johnston 10'; Secco 15'; Sourisseau 48'

Umpires:
Catherine Wright (WAL)
Cookie Tan (SGP)

== Lawn bowls ==
South Africa will compete in Lawn bowls.

Men

Athlete	Event	Group stage						Quarterfinal	Semifinal	Final / BM	
Athlete	Event	Opposition Score	Opposition Score	Opposition Score	Opposition Score	Opposition Score	Rank	Opposition Score	Opposition Score	Opposition Score	Rank
Petrus Breitenbach	Singles	Wilson (AUS); L 6–21	Salmon (WAL); W 21–15	Aquilina (MLT); W 21–17	Jones (NFI); W 21–13	Paniani (COK); W 21–19	2 Q	Bester (CAN); L 9-21	Did not advance		
Petrus Breitenbach; Jason Evans	Pairs	Wales; W 17–15	Northern Ireland; W 20–16	Isle of Man; W 19–13	Jamaica; W 28–6	—N/a	1 Q	Cook Islands; L 14–15	Did not advance		
Gerry Baker; Rudi Jacobs; Morgan Muvhango	Triples	England; L 13–24	Wales; L 6–22	India; L 17–18	Papua New Guinea; W 16–15	—N/a	4	Did not advance			
Gerry Baker; Jason Evans; Rudi Jacobs; Morgan Muvhango	Fours	India; L 7–19	Australia; L 6–27	Norfolk Island; W 25–7	Botswana; W 22–6	—N/a	3	Did not advance			

Women

Athlete	Event	Group stage					Quarterfinal	Semifinal	Final / BM	
Athlete	Event	Opposition Score	Opposition Score	Opposition Score	Opposition Score	Rank	Opposition Score	Opposition Score	Opposition Score	Rank
Colleen Piketh	Singles	Murphy (AUS); L 16–21	Beattie (NIR); W 21–13	Kioa (TGA); W 21–4	Siame (ZAM); W 21–9	2 Q	Murphy (AUS); W 21–19	Edwards (NZL); L 17–21	McKerihen (CAN); W 21–17	3rd place, bronze medalist(s)
Nicolene Neal; Colleen Piketh	Pairs	India; W 19–17	Northern Ireland; W 20–12	Wales; W 23–17	Jersey; W 23–6	1 Q	England; W 14–12	Scotland; W 18–10	Malaysia; L 14–15	2nd place, silver medalist(s)
Elma Davis; Esme Kruger; Johanna Snyman	Triples	England; L 11–28	Northern Ireland; L 13–14	Niue; W 40–7	—N/a	3	Did not advance			
Elma Davis; Esme Kruger; Nicolene Neal; Johanna Snyman	Fours	New Zealand; W 16–11	Zambia; W 17–10	Norfolk Island; D 10–10	Jersey; W 19–7	1 Q	New Zealand; W 16–8	Malta; W 14–8	Australia l 16–18	2nd place, silver medalist(s)

Para-sport

Athlete	Event	Group stage						Semifinal	Final / BM	
Athlete	Event	Opposition Score	Opposition Score	Opposition Score	Opposition Score	Opposition Score	Rank	Opposition Score	Opposition Score	Rank
Nozipho Schroeder; Johanna van Rooyen (Guide); Philippus Walker; Graham Ward (Guide)	Pairs	Australia; L 3 - 26	New Zealand; W 14 - 12	Scotland; W 18 - 3	England; W 19 - 8	Wales; W 11 - 8	1 Q	Wales; W 11 - 9	Australia; L 9 - 12	2nd place, silver medalist(s)
Tobias Botha; Christopher Patton; Willem Viljoen	Triples	England; D 13 - 13	Australia; L 10 - 13	Wales; W 21 - 4	New Zealand; L 11 - 19	Scotland; W 15 - 7	4 Q	Australia; L 7 - 15	England; W 16 - 13	3rd place, bronze medalist(s)

== Netball ==
South Africa qualified a netball team by virtue of being ranked in the top 11 (excluding the host nation, Australia) of the INF World Rankings on July 1, 2017.

Roster

The following is the South Africa roster in the netball tournament of the 2018 Commonwealth Games.

South Africa national netball team – 2018 Commonwealth Games roster
Players
Coaches

Pos.	Name	Age - DOB	Ht.	Club	Club nat.
	Burger, Erin	-	–		(South Africa)
	Burger, Sigrid	-	–	Surrey Storm	(England)
	Griesel, Izette	-	–	Gauteng Jaguars	(South Africa)
	Holtzhausen, Maryka	-	–	Severn Stars	(England)
	Maweni, Phumza	-	–	Severn Stars	(England)
	Msomi, Bongiwe (C)	-	–	Adelaide Thunderbirds	(Australia)
	Mthembu, Precious	-	–	Kingdom Stars	(South Africa)
	Pretorius, Karla	-	–	Sunshine Coast Lightning	(Australia)
	Stoltz, Renske	-	–	Wasps Netball	(England)
	van der Merwe, Shadine	-	–	Gauteng Jaguars	(South Africa)
	Venter, Ine-Mari	-	–	Gauteng Jaguars	(South Africa)
	Vimbela, Zanele	-	–	Team Bath	(South Africa)

Head coach

Norma Plummer

Legend

- (C) Team captain
- Club field describes current pro club
- Injured

Pool A

Pos	Team	Pld	W	D	L	GF	GA	GD	Pts	Qualification
1	Australia (H)	5	5	0	0	413	162	+251	10	Semi-finals
2	Jamaica	5	4	0	1	351	221	+130	8	Semi-finals
3	South Africa	5	3	0	2	310	205	+105	6	Classification matches
4	Northern Ireland	5	2	0	3	224	307	−83	4	Classification matches
5	Barbados	5	1	0	4	185	333	−148	2	Classification matches
6	Fiji	5	0	0	5	171	426	−255	0	Classification matches

Updated to match(es) played on 11 April 2018. Source: GC2018
(H) Hosts

6 April 2018
15:00

Report
South Africa
46–57
Jamaica

Gold Coast Convention and Exhibition Centre
Umpires: Gary Burgess
Michelle Phippard
Reserve umpire: Helen George
Venter 19/23 (83%)
Burger 15/15 (100%)
Holtzhausen 12/18 (67%)

Fowler-Reid 29/31 (94%)
Beckford 15/20 (75%)
Aiken 13/16 (81%)

7 April 2018
15:00

Report
Northern Ireland
35–49
South Africa

Gold Coast Convention and Exhibition Centre
Umpires: Kate Stephenson
Lisa McPhail
Reserve umpire: Jackie Mizon
L. Bowman 21/25 (84%)
Lennon 5/6 (83%)
McCullogh 5/11 (45%)
K. Bowman 4/7 (57%)

Burger 38/41 (93%)
Venter 7/9 (78%)
Holtzhausen 4/9 (44%)

8 April 2018
20:30

Report
Australia
60–38
South Africa

Gold Coast Convention and Exhibition Centre
Umpires: Jono Bredin
Lisa McPhail
Reserve umpire: Kate Stephenson
Bassett 20/23 (87%)
Thwaites 15/15 (100%)
Wood 14/15 (93%)
Pettitt 11/11 (100%)

Venter 33/40 (83%)
Holtzhausen 5/10 (50%)

10 April 2018
18:30

Report
South Africa
92–28
Fiji

Gold Coast Convention and Exhibition Centre
Umpires: Michelle Phippard
Jackie Mizon
Reserve umpire: Kate Stephenson
Burger 56/59 (95%)
Venter 20/22 (91%)
Stoltz 16/21 (76%)

Waqa 19/26 (73%)
M. Rusivakula 8/12 (67%)
U. Rusivakula 1/2 (50%)

11 April 2018
11:00

Report
South Africa
85–25
Barbados

Gold Coast Convention and Exhibition Centre
Umpires: Jackie Mizon
Kate Stephenson
Reserve umpire: Jono Bredin
Venter 34/35 (97%)
Burger 33/35 (94%)
Holtzhausen 10/14 (71%)
Stoltz 8/9 (89%)

Blackman 14/15 (93%)
Payne 11/17 (65%)

Fifth place match

12 April 2018
09:00

Report
South Africa
53–42
Uganda

Gold Coast Convention and Exhibition Centre
Umpires: Jackie Mizon
Joshua Bowring
Reserve umpire: Marc Henning
Venter 42/46 (91%)
Holtzhausen 11/12 (92%)

Oyella 22/25 (88%)
Proscovia 19/19 (100%)
Nanyonga 1/4 (25%)

== Rugby sevens ==
=== Men's tournament ===
South Africa qualified a men's team of 12 athletes by being among the top nine ranked nations from the Commonwealth in the 2016–17 World Rugby Sevens Series ranking.

Roster

- Cecil Afrika
- Timothy Agaba
- Kyle Brown
- Zain Davids
- Branco du Preez
- Justin Geduld
- Werner Kok
- Ruhan Nel
- Dylan Sage
- Philip Snyman
- Siviwe Soyizwapi
- Rosko Specman
- Reserve: Mogamat Davids

Pool A

Pos	Team	Pld	W	D	L	PF	PA	PD	Pts	Qualification
1	South Africa	3	3	0	0	121	5	+116	9	Semi-finals
2	Scotland	3	2	0	1	73	26	+47	7	Classification semi-finals
3	Papua New Guinea	3	1	0	2	31	84	−53	5	
4	Malaysia	3	0	0	3	5	115	−110	3	

Source: GC2018
Rules for classification: 1) Points; 2) Head-to-head result; 3) Point difference; 4) Points scored.

14 April 2018
12:05

South Africa	43–0	Malaysia
Try: Sage 2' m Geduld (2) 3' m, 9' c Du Preez 4' c Snyman 7' m Specman 8' c Agaba 10' c Con: Du Preez (2/5) 5', 8'; Geduld (2/2) 9', 10'	(Gold Coast 2018)

Robina Stadium, Gold Coast
Referee: Craig Evans (Wales)

14 April 2018
18:37

South Africa	52–0	Papua New Guinea
Try: Kok 1' c Specman (2) 1' m, 9' c Nel (2) 3' c, 5' c Sage 7' c Du Preez 11' m Davids 13' c Con: Du Preez (5/7) 1', 4', 5', 7', 9'; Afrika (1/1) 13'	(Gold Coast 2018)

Robina Stadium, Gold Coast
Referee: Richard Kelly (New Zealand)

14 April 2018
22:17

South Africa	26–5	Scotland
Try: Specman 4' c Nel 8' c Afrika 9' m Geduld 12' c Con: Geduld (3/4) 5', 8', 12'	(Gold Coast 2018)	Try: Farndale 14' m Con: Fergusson (0/1); Cards: Jackson (yellow card) 7' to 9'

Robina Stadium, Gold Coast
Referee: Damon Murphy (Australia)

Semi-finals

15 April 2018	South Africa	19–24 (a.e.t.)	Fiji	Gold Coast
12:05

Bronze medal match

15 April 2018	England	21–14	South Africa	Gold Coast
14:17

=== Women's tournament ===
South Africa also qualified a women's team of 12. This qualification came after the South African women's team won the African Cup in 2017. The gold and silver medalist of Africa would then automatically qualify for the 2018 games. The silver medalists were Kenya.

Roster

- Veroeshka Grain
- Zenay Jordaan
- Megan Comley
- Unathi Mali
- Nomsa Mokwai
- Zintle Mpupha
- Zinhle Ndawonde
- Marithy Pienaar
- Nadine Roos
- Mathrin Simmers
- Chané Stadler
- Eloise Webb

Pool A

Pos	Team	Pld	W	D	L	PF	PA	PD	Pts	Qualification
1	New Zealand	3	3	0	0	110	7	+103	9	Semi-finals
2	Canada	3	2	0	1	60	36	+24	7	Semi-finals
3	Kenya	3	1	0	2	31	79	−48	5	Classification semi-finals
4	South Africa	3	0	0	3	10	89	−79	3	Classification semi-finals

Source: GC2018
Rules for classification: 1) Points; 2) Head-to-head result; 3) Point difference; 4) Points scored.

13 April 2018
16:31

Canada	29–0	South Africa
Try: Crossley 1' m Benn 2' c Kaljuvee 4' c Williams 6' m Darling 8' m Con: Landry (2/4) 3', 4'; Lukan (0/1)	(Gold Coast 2018)

Robina Stadium, Gold Coast
Referee: Hollie Davidson (Scotland)

13 April 2018
19:33

New Zealand	41–0	South Africa
Try: Goss 1' c Woodman (2) 1' m, 8' c Blyde 6' m Broughton 7' m Williams 9' c Brazier 12' m Con: Nathan-Wong (3/6) 1', 8', 9'; Willison (0/1)	(Gold Coast 2018)

Robina Stadium, Gold Coast
Referee: Sara Cox (England)

14 April 2018
12:27

South Africa	10–19	Kenya
Try: Simmers 8' m Jordaan 9' m Con: Jordaan (0/2)	(Gold Coast 2018)	Try: Okelo 2' c Masinde 7' c Olando 13' m Con: Okulu (2/3) 3', 7'

Robina Stadium, Gold Coast
Referee: Rebecca Mahoney (New Zealand)

Classification semi-finals

15 April 2018	Fiji	40–12	South Africa	Gold Coast
9:31

Match for seventh place

15 April 2018	South Africa	14–19	Wales	Gold Coast
12:27

== Shooting ==
South Africa participated with 4 athletes (4 men).

Men

Athlete	Event	Qualification		Semifinal		Final	
Athlete	Event	Points	Rank	Points	Rank	Points	Rank
Pierre Basson	10 metre air rifle	604.7	15	—N/a		Did not advance	
Bartholomeus Pienaar	10 metre air rifle	612.7	11	—N/a		Did not advance	

Open

Athlete	Event	Day 1		Day 2		Day 3		Total	
Athlete	Event	Points	Rank	Points	Rank	Points	Rank	Overall	Rank
Jacobus Du Toit	Queen's prize individual	103-6v	21	146-15v	19	144-12v	21	393-33v	20
Petrus Haasbroek	Queen's prize individual	104-12v	10	149-20v	6	146-13v	16	399-45v	11
Jacobus Du Toit; Petrus Haasbroek	Queen's prize pairs	299-37v	2	282-16v	6	—N/a		581-53v	4

== Swimming ==
A total of 25 South African Swimmers has qualified for the games. This includes 2 para-swimmers.

Men

Athlete	Event	Heat		Semifinal		Final	
Athlete	Event	Time	Rank	Time	Rank	Time	Rank
Ryan Coetzee	50 m freestyle	DNS		Did not advance			
Brad Tandy	50 m freestyle	21.78	2 Q	21.92	2 Q	21.81	2nd place, silver medalist(s)
Christian Sadie	50 m freestyle S7	29.54	2 Q	—N/a		29.65	2nd place, silver medalist(s)
Calvyn Justus	100 m freestyle	50.06	20	Did not advance			
Chad le Clos	100 m freestyle	49.17	7 Q	48.61	2 Q	48.15	2nd place, silver medalist(s)
Chad le Clos	200 m freestyle	1:47.37	6 Q	—N/a		1:47.46	7
Eben Vorster	200 m freestyle	1:50.78	18	—N/a		Did not advance	
Brent Szurdoki	400 m freestyle	3:56.40	10	—N/a		Did not advance	
Eben Vorster	400 m freestyle	3:56.82	11	—N/a		Did not advance	
Brent Szurdoki	1500 m freestyle	—N/a				15:28.60	4
Martin Binedell	100 m backstroke	56.37	12 Q	55.25	9	Did not advance	
Calvyn Justus	100 m backstroke	55.69	10 Q	55.25	9	Did not advance	
Jarryd Baxter	200 m backstroke	2:02.17	13	—N/a		Did not advance	
Martin Binedell	200 m backstroke	1:57.92	1 Q	—N/a		1:57.87	6
Luan Grobbelaar	200 m backstroke	2:06.10	18	—N/a		Did not advance	
Michael Houlie	50 m breaststroke	27.92	6 Q	27.64	5 Q	27.83	6
Brad Tandy	50 m breaststroke	28.17	11 Q	27.99	8 Q	28.37	8
Cameron van der Burgh	50 m breaststroke	27.01	2 Q	26.95	2 Q	26.58	1st place, gold medalist(s)
Michael Houlie	100 m breaststroke	1:01.66	9 Q	1:01.47	10	Did not advance	
Cameron van der Burgh	100 m breaststroke	1:00.20	3 Q	59.74	3 Q	59.44	3rd place, bronze medalist(s)
Kaleb van der Merwe	100 m breaststroke SB8	1:28.26	7 Q	—N/a		1:26.11	7
Luan Grobbelaar	200 m breaststroke	2:18.90	11	—N/a		Did not advance	
Ayrton Sweeney	200 m breaststroke	2:13.27	9	—N/a		Did not advance	
Ryan Coetzee	50 m butterfly	23.94	3 Q	23.79	3 Q	23.73	3rd place, bronze medalist(s)
Chad le Clos	50 m butterfly	23.53	1 Q	23.53	1 Q	23.37	1st place, gold medalist(s)
Brad Tandy	50 m butterfly	24.41	10 Q	24.35	10	Did not advance	
Ryan Coetzee	100 m butterfly	55.03	14 Q	54.17	12	Did not advance	
Chad le Clos	100 m butterfly	53.67	5 Q	52.56	4 Q	50.65	1st place, gold medalist(s)
Eben Vorster	100 m butterfly	55.11	15 Q	54.75	14	Did not advance	
Chad le Clos	200 m butterfly	1:57.89	4 Q	—N/a		1:54.00	1st place, gold medalist(s)
Eben Vorster	200 m butterfly	2:00.72	12	—N/a		Did not advance	
Jarryd Baxter	200 m individual medley	2:02.23	11	—N/a		Did not advance	
Ayrton Sweeney	200 m individual medley	2:03.19	15	—N/a		Did not advance	
Eben Vorster	200 m individual medley	2:07.11	17	—N/a		Did not advance	
Luan Grobbelaar	400 m individual medley	4:22.77	9	—N/a		Did not advance	
Ayrton Sweeney	400 m individual medley	4:18.08	2 Q	—N/a		4:17.79	4
Ryan Coetzee; Calvyn Justus; Chad le Clos; Brad Tandy; Jarryd Baxter*; Eben Vorster*	4 × 100 m freestyle relay	3:21.50	7 Q	—N/a		3:17.27	6
Calvyn Justus; Chad le Clos; Cameron van der Burgh; Brad Tandy; Ryan Coetzee*; Michael Houlie*; Martin Binedell*	4 × 100 m medley relay	3:42.44	5 Q	—N/a		3:34.79	3rd place, bronze medalist(s)

* Competed in heats only.

Women

Athlete	Event	Heat		Semifinal		Final	
Athlete	Event	Time	Rank	Time	Rank	Time	Rank
Emma Chelius	50 m freestyle	25.62	8 Q	25.89	10	Did not advance	
Erin Gallagher	50 m freestyle	25.21	5 Q	25.03	5 Q	25.03	5
Emma Chelius	100 m freestyle	56.04	12 Q	56.40	14	Did not advance	
Erin Gallagher	100 m freestyle	55.36	9 Q	54.38	7 Q	54.23	6
Kristin Bellingan	200 m freestyle	2:04.37	15	—N/a		Did not advance	
Dune Coetzee	200 m freestyle	2:04.15	14	—N/a		Did not advance	
Marlies Ross	200 m freestyle	2:08.29	17	—N/a		Did not advance	
Kate Beavon	400 m freestyle	4:17.59	12	—N/a		Did not advance	
Kristin Bellingan	400 m freestyle	4:20.92	15	—N/a		Did not advance	
Dune Coetzee	400 m freestyle	4:15.21	11	—N/a		Did not advance	
Kate Beavon	800 m freestyle	8:49.16	8 Q	—N/a		8:49.16	8
Kristin Bellingan	800 m freestyle	9:02.88	9	—N/a		Did not advance	
Erin Gallagher	50 m backstroke	29.38	15 Q	Withdrew		Did not advance	
Mariella Venter	50 m backstroke	29.88	17 R	29.58	16	Did not advance	
Nathania van Niekerk	100 m backstroke	1:02.81	15 Q	1:03.06	16	Did not advance	
Mariella Venter	100 m backstroke	1:03.39	17	Did not advance			
Nathania van Niekerk	200 m backstroke	2:16.07	11	—N/a		Did not advance	
Mariella Venter	200 m backstroke	2:14.82	10	—N/a		Did not advance	
Kaylene Corbett	50 m breaststroke	32.51	17	Did not advance			
Tatjana Schoenmaker	50 m breaststroke	30.92	3 Q	31.01	5 Q	30.82	4
Emily Visagie	50 m breaststroke	32.73	18	Did not advance			
Kaylene Corbett	100 m breaststroke	1:09.40	10 Q	1:09.36	13	Did not advance	
Tatjana Schoenmaker	100 m breaststroke	1:07.69	2 Q	1:06.65	1 Q	1:06.41	1st place, gold medalist(s)
Emily Visagie	100 m breaststroke	1:10.65	16 Q	1:10.80	15	Did not advance	
Kaylene Corbett	200 m breaststroke	2:27.68	7 Q	—N/a		2:29.40	8
Tatjana Schoenmaker	200 m breaststroke	2:23.57	1 Q	—N/a		2:22.02	1st place, gold medalist(s)
Emily Visagie	200 m breaststroke	2:28.37	9 R	—N/a		2:29.25	7
Emma Chelius	50 m butterfly	27.55	13 Q	27.52	13	Did not advance	
Erin Gallagher	50 m butterfly	27.05	8 Q	26.85	8 Q	26.84	7
Dune Coetzee	100 m butterfly	1:02.03	17	Did not advance			
Erin Gallagher	100 m butterfly	59.25	8 Q	59.04	9	Did not advance	
Dune Coetzee	200 m butterfly	2:12.38	11	—N/a		Did not advance	
Marlies Ross	200 m individual medley	2:19.67	13	—N/a		Did not advance	
Emily Visagie	200 m individual medley	2:18.27	11	—N/a		Did not advance	
Marlies Ross	400 m individual medley	4:55.30	11	—N/a		Did not advance	
Emma Chelius; Erin Gallagher; Marlies Ross; Dune Coetzee	4 × 100 m freestyle relay	—N/a				3:46.04	5
Kate Beavon; Kristin Bellingan; Dune Coetzee; Marlies Ross	4 × 200 m freestyle relay	—N/a				8:18.31	6
Emma Chelius; Kaylene Corbett; Erin Gallagher; Nathania van Niekerk; Mariella Venter	4 × 100 m medley relay	—N/a				4:12.02	7

== Table tennis ==
South Africa participated with 1 athlete (1 man).

Para-sport

Athletes	Event	Group stage				Semifinal	Final	Rank
Athletes	Event	Opposition Score	Opposition Score	Opposition Score	Rank	Opposition Score	Opposition Score	Rank
Theo Cogill	Men's TT6–10	Ross Wilson (ENG); L 3-2	Barak Mizrachi (AUS); W 3-0	Temitope Ogunsanya (NGR); W 3-0	2 Q	Kim Daybell (ENG); L 3-2	Joshua Stacey (WAL); L 3-2	4

== Triathlon ==
South Africa participated with 5 athletes (3 men and 2 women).

Individual

Athlete	Event	Swim (750 m)	Trans 1	Bike (20 km)	Trans 2	Run (5 km)	Total	Rank
Richard Murray	Men's	9:12	0:32	27:51	0:26	15:03	53:04	6
Henri Schoeman	Men's	8:51	0:35	27:45	0:24	15:00	52:31	1st place, gold medalist(s)
Wian Sullwald	Men's	9:03	0:34	27:58	0:29	18:26	56:30	20
Simone Ackermann	Women's	9:46	0:39	34:53	0:30	20:05	1:05:53	18
Gillian Sanders	Women's	10:01	0:39	33:04	0:29	18:53	1:03:06	15

Mixed Relay

Athletes	Event	Total Times per Athlete (Swim 250 m, Bike 7 km, Run 1.5 km)	Total Group Time	Rank
Simone Ackermann; Henri Schoeman; Gillian Sanders; Richard Murray	Mixed relay	23:21; 18:56; 22:08; 19:09	1:23:34	8

== Weightlifting ==
South Africa participated with 3 athletes (3 women).

Athlete	Event	Snatch		Clean & jerk		Total	Rank
Athlete	Event	Result	Rank	Result	Rank	Total	Rank
Johanni Taljaard	Women's −58 kg	78	6	93	8	171	6
Mona Pretorius	Women's −63 kg	91	3	115	2	206	3rd place, bronze medalist(s)
Celestie Engelbrecht	Women's −69 kg	83	8	110	6	193	7

=== Powerlifting ===
South Africa participated with 1 athlete (1 man).

Athlete	Event	Result	Rank
Ricardo Fitzpatrick	Men's heavyweight	152.1	7

== Wrestling ==
South Africa participated with 5 athletes (5 men).

Athlete	Event	Round of 16	Quarterfinal	Semifinal	Repechage	Final / BM	
Athlete	Event	Opposition Result	Opposition Result	Opposition Result	Opposition Result	Opposition Result	Rank
Jan Combrinck	Men's freestyle -57 kg	Bye	Takahashi (CAN); L 1 - 3	Did not advance	Bye	Welson (NGR); L 1 - 3	5
Terry van Rensburg	Men's freestyle -65 kg	Daniel (NGR); L 0 - 3	Did not advance				10
Johannes Botha	Men's freestyle -74 kg	Fernando (SLE); W 4 - 1	Dodge (WAL); W 4 - 0	Assizecourt (NGR); W 5 - 0	—N/a	Sushil (IND); L 0 - 4	2nd place, silver medalist(s)
Michael Gaitskill	Men's freestyle -86 kg	Moore (CAN); L 1 - 4	Did not advance				11
Martin Erasmus	Men's freestyle -97 kg	Belkin (NZL); W 4 - 0	Verreynne (AUS); W 4 - 1	Steen (CAN); W 4 - 1	—N/a	Khatri (IND); W 4 - 1	1st place, gold medalist(s)

== See also ==
- South Africa at the 2018 Summer Youth Olympics
