= Swimming at the 2018 Commonwealth Games – Men's 200 metre butterfly =

Men's 200 metre butterfly at the 2018 Commonwealth Games
- Venue: Gold Coast Aquatic Centre
- Dates: 7 April
- Competitors: 14 from 9 nations
- Winning time: 1:54.00

Medalists
gold medal	Chad le Clos	South Africa
silver medal	David Morgan	Australia
bronze medal	Duncan Scott	Scotland

The men's 200 metre butterfly event at the 2018 Commonwealth Games was held on 7 April at the Gold Coast Aquatic Centre.

== Records ==
Prior to this competition, the existing world, Commonwealth and Games records were as follows:

World record	Michael Phelps (USA)	1:51.51	Rome, Italy	29 July 2009
Commonwealth record	Chad le Clos (RSA)	1:52.96	London, United Kingdom	31 July 2012
Games record	Chad le Clos (RSA)	1:55.07	Glasgow, United Kingdom	26 July 2014

The following records were established during the competition:

Date	Event	Name	Nationality	Time	Record
7 April	Final	Chad le Clos	South Africa	1:54.00	GR

== Results ==
=== Heats ===
The heats were held at 10:31.

Rank	Heat	Lane	Name	Nationality	Time	Notes
1	2	3	Mackenzie Darragh	Canada	1:56.96	Q
2	1	4	David Morgan	Australia	1:57.42	Q
3	2	6	Duncan Scott	Scotland	1:57.64	Q
4	2	4	Chad le Clos	South Africa	1:57.89	Q
5	1	5	Grant Irvine	Australia	1:57.91	Q
6	1	7	Lewis Clareburt	New Zealand	1:58.32	Q
7	1	3	Jacob Peters	England	1:58.42	Q
8	2	5	James Guy	England	1:58.43	Q, WD
9	2	2	Sajan Prakash	India	1:58.87	Q
10	1	6	Joe Litchfield	England	1:59.69	
11	2	7	Bradlee Ashby	New Zealand	2:00.30	
12	1	2	Eben Vorster	South Africa	2:00.72	
13	2	1	Cherantha de Silva	Sri Lanka	2:08.71	
14	1	1	Matt Savitz	Gibraltar	2:15.41	

=== Final ===
The final was held at 19:37.

Rank	Lane	Name	Nationality	Time	Notes
1st place, gold medalist(s)	6	Chad Le Clos	South Africa	1:54.00	GR
2nd place, silver medalist(s)	5	David Morgan	Australia	1:56.36	
3rd place, bronze medalist(s)	3	Duncan Scott	Scotland	1:56.60	
4	2	Grant Irvine	Australia	1:56.91	
5	1	Jacob Peters	England	1:57.75	
6	4	Mackenzie Darragh	Canada	1:57.81	
7	7	Lewis Clareburt	New Zealand	1:58.51	
8	8	Sajan Prakash	India	1:59.05	
