= Swimming at the 2018 Commonwealth Games – Men's 50 metre freestyle =

Men's 50 metre freestyle at the 2018 Commonwealth Games
- Venue: Gold Coast Aquatic Centre
- Dates: 9 April (semifinals, heats); 10 April (final)
- Competitors: 60 from 37 nations
- Winning time: 21.35

Medalists
gold medal	Benjamin Proud	England
silver medal	Brad Tandy	South Africa
bronze medal	Cameron McEvoy	Australia

The Men's 50 metre freestyle event at the 2018 Commonwealth Games was held on 9 and 10 April at the Gold Coast Aquatic Centre.

== Records ==
Prior to this competition, the existing world, Commonwealth and Games records were as follows:

Record	Time	Athlete (nation)	Meet	Location	Date	Ref
World record	20.91	César Cielo (BRA)		São Paulo, Brazil	18 December 2009	
Commonwealth record	21.19	Ashley Callus (AUS)		Canberra, Australia	26 November 2009	
Games record	21.76	Benjamin Proud (ENG)		Glasgow, Scotland	28 July 2014	

The following records were established during the competition:

Date	Event	Name	Nationality	Time	Record
9 April	Heats	Benjamin Proud	England	21.45	GR
9 April	Semifinal	Benjamin Proud	England	21.30	GR

== Results ==
=== Heats ===
The 16 fastest swimmers in the heats qualified for the semifinals.

Rank	Heat	Lane	Name	Nationality	Time	Notes
1	8	4	Benjamin Proud	England	21.45	Q, GR
2	6	4	Brad Tandy	South Africa	21.78	Q
3	7	4	Cameron McEvoy	Australia	22.06	Q
4	8	5	James Roberts	Australia	22.11	Q
5	8	3	Thomas Fannon	England	22.12	Q
6	7	5	James Magnussen	Australia	22.23	Q
7	6	5	David Cumberlidge	England	22.25	Q
8	6	3	Daniel Hunter	New Zealand	22.32	Q
9	7	3	Yuri Kisil	Canada	22.40	Q
10	6	6	Jack Thorpe	Scotland	22.48	Q
11	8	7	Bradley Vincent	Mauritius	22.50	Q
12	8	2	Calum Bain	Northern Ireland	22.53	Q
13	7	8	Matthew Abeysinghe	Sri Lanka	22.65	Q, NR
14	6	1	Scott McLay	Scotland	22.79	Q
15	8	6	Ruslan Gaziev	Canada	22.80	Q
16	7	6	Sam Perry	New Zealand	22.93	Q
17	7	2	Miles Munro	Guernsey	22.94	
18	8	8	Kieran McGuckin	Scotland	22.96	
19	6	2	Virdhawal Khade	India	23.11	
20	7	1	Jordan Sloan	Northern Ireland	23.19	
21	6	8	David Thompson	Northern Ireland	23.29	
22	5	3	Keith Kit Sern Lim	Malaysia	23.33	
23	4	4	Jean-Luc Zephir	Saint Lucia	23.45	
24	5	2	Abeiku Jackson	Ghana	23.47	
25	6	7	Darren Lim	Singapore	23.50	
26	5	4	Igor Mogne	Mozambique	23.58	
27	5	5	Kyle Abeysinghe	Sri Lanka	23.73	
28	4	1	Alex Sobers	Barbados	23.75	
29	5	6	Issa Mohamed	Kenya	23.80	
30	3	4	Harry Shalamon	Jersey	24.01	
31	5	7	Izaak Bastian	Bahamas	24.07	
32	4	5	Denilson da Costa	Mozambique	24.12	
33	5	8	Stefano Mitchell	Antigua and Barbuda	24.14	
34	2	4	Brandon Schuster	Samoa	24.19	
35	5	1	Samuel Seghers	Papua New Guinea	24.25	
36	8	1	Cherantha de Silva	Sri Lanka	24.29	
37	4	3	Hilal Hilal	Tanzania	24.37	
38	4	6	Epeli Rabua Herbert	Fiji	24.38	
39	4	7	Gregory Anodin	Mauritius	24.52	
40	3	6	Josh Tarere	Papua New Guinea	24.68	
41	3	1	James Sanderson	Gibraltar	24.72	NR
42	2	5	Paul Elaisa	Fiji	24.77	
43	4	2	Syed Muhammad Haseeb Tariq	Pakistan	24.82	
44	3	5	Andrew Fowler	Guyana	24.87	
45	3	7	Adam Moncherry	Seychelles	24.88	
45	4	8	Dean Hoffman	Seychelles	24.88	
47	2	6	Joshua Tibatemwa	Uganda	24.93	
48	2	3	Jadon Wuilliez	Antigua and Barbuda	25.15	
49	2	2	Ashley Seeto	Papua New Guinea	25.42	
50	3	8	Nikolas Sylvester	Saint Vincent and the Grenadines	25.44	
51	2	7	Alexander Cyrus	Saint Vincent and the Grenadines	25.57	
52	2	1	Corey Ollivierre	Grenada	25.71	
53	3	2	Temaruata Strickland	Cook Islands	25.96	
54	1	7	Finau Ohuafi	Tonga	26.07	
55	2	8	Cruz Halbich	Saint Vincent and the Grenadines	26.15	
56	1	5	Ben Dillon	Saint Helena	26.28	
57	1	4	Duwaine Yon	Saint Helena	26.47	
58	3	3	Clayment Lafiara	Solomon Islands	27.07	
59	1	6	Colby Thomas	Saint Helena	27.88	
	1	2	Ishmael Koroma	Sierra Leone	DNS	
	7	7	Ryan Coetzee	South Africa	DNS	
	1	3	Faletiute Tinapa	Tuvalu	DSQ	

=== Semifinals ===
The eight fastest swimmers from the semifinals progressed to the final.

==== Semifinal 1 ====
Rank	Lane	Name	Nation	Result	Notes
1	4	Brad Tandy	South Africa	21.92	Q
2	5	James Roberts	Australia	22.11	Q
3	3	James Magnussen	Australia	22.20	Q
4	6	Daniel Hunter	New Zealand	22.34	
5	7	Calum Bain	Northern Ireland	22.39	
6	2	Jack Thorpe	Scotland	22.49	
7	1	Scott McLay	Scotland	22.55	
8	8	Sam Perry	New Zealand	23.13	

==== Semifinal 2 ====
Rank	Lane	Name	Nation	Result	Notes
1	4	Benjamin Proud	England	21.30	Q, GR, NR
2	5	Cameron McEvoy	Australia	22.00	Q
3	2	Yuri Kisil	Canada	22.09	Q
3	3	Thomas Fannon	England	22.09	Q
5	6	David Cumberlidge	England	22.15	Q
6	7	Bradley Vincent	Mauritius	22.60	
7	8	Ruslan Gaziev	Canada	22.80	
8	1	Matthew Abeysinghe	Sri Lanka	22.84	

=== Final ===
The final was held on 10 April at 19:45.

Rank	Lane	Name	Nation	Result	Notes
1st place, gold medalist(s)	4	Benjamin Proud	England	21.35	
2nd place, silver medalist(s)	5	Brad Tandy	South Africa	21.81	
3rd place, bronze medalist(s)	3	Cameron McEvoy	Australia	21.92	
4	1	David Cumberlidge	England	22.00	
5	6	Yuri Kisil	Canada	22.03	
6	8	James Magnussen	Australia	22.05	
7	7	James Roberts	Australia	22.15	
8	2	Thomas Fannon	England	22.25	
