= Swimming at the 2018 Commonwealth Games – Men's 400 metre freestyle =

Men's 400 metre freestyle at the 2018 Commonwealth Games
- Venue: Gold Coast Aquatic Centre
- Dates: 5 April
- Competitors: 14 from 11 nations
- Winning time: 3:43.76

Medalists
gold medal	Mack Horton	Australia
silver medal	Jack McLoughlin	Australia
bronze medal	James Guy	England

The men's 400 metre freestyle event at the 2018 Commonwealth Games was held on 5 April at the Gold Coast Aquatic Centre.

== Records ==
Prior to this competition, the existing world, Commonwealth and Games records were as follows:

World record	Paul Biedermann (GER)	3:40.07	Rome, Italy	26 July 2009
Commonwealth record	Ian Thorpe (AUS)	3:40.08	Manchester, United Kingdom	30 July 2002
Games record	Ian Thorpe (AUS)	3:40.08	Manchester, United Kingdom	30 July 2002

== Schedule ==
The schedule is as follows:

All times are Australian Eastern Standard Time (UTC+10)

Date	Time	Round
Thursday 5 April 2018	10:47	Qualifying
Thursday 5 April 2018	19:46	Final

== Results ==
=== Heats ===
Rank	Heat	Lane	Name	Nationality	Time	Notes
1	2	4	Mack Horton	Australia	3:47.93	Q
2	2	6	Daniel Jervis	Wales	3:48.18	Q
3	1	5	Jack McLoughlin	Australia	3:48.31	Q
4	2	5	David McKeon	Australia	3:48.86	Q
5	1	4	James Guy	England	3:50.23	Q
6	1	3	Jeremy Bagshaw	Canada	3:50.76	Q
7	2	3	Stephen Milne	Scotland	3:51.65	Q
8	1	6	Welson Sim	Malaysia	3:51.78	Q
9	1	2	Wesley Roberts	Cook Islands	3:56.09	
10	2	2	Brent Szurdoki	South Africa	3:56.40	
11	1	7	Eben Vorster	South Africa	3:56.82	
12	1	1	Brandon Schuster	Samoa	4:03.50	
13	2	7	Constantinos Hadjittooulis	Cyprus	4:06.03	
14	2	1	Mathieu Marquet	Mauritius	4:09.79	

=== Final ===
Rank	Lane	Name	Nationality	Time	Notes
1st place, gold medalist(s)	4	Mack Horton	Australia	3:43.76	
2nd place, silver medalist(s)	3	Jack McLoughlin	Australia	3:45.21	
3rd place, bronze medalist(s)	2	James Guy	England	3:45.32	
4	5	Daniel Jervis	Wales	3:48.08	
5	7	Jeremy Bagshaw	Canada	3:49.52	
6	6	David McKeon	Australia	3:49.60	
7	8	Welson Sim	Malaysia	3:53.36	
8	1	Stephen Milne	Scotland	3:55.01	
