= Swimming at the 2018 Commonwealth Games – Women's 400 metre freestyle =

Women's 400 metre freestyle at the 2018 Commonwealth Games
- Venue: Gold Coast Aquatic Centre
- Dates: 10 April
- Competitors: 21 from 13 nations
- Winning time: 4:00.93

Medalists
gold medal	Ariarne Titmus	Australia
silver medal	Holly Hibbott	England
bronze medal	Ellie Faulkner	England

The women's 400 metre freestyle event at the 2018 Commonwealth Games took place on 10 April at the Gold Coast Aquatic Centre.

== Records ==
Prior to this competition, the existing world, Commonwealth and Games records were as follows:

World record	Katie Ledecky (USA)	3:56.46	Rio de Janeiro, Brazil	7 August 2016
Commonwealth record	Joanne Jackson (GBR)	4:00.60	Rome, Italy	26 July 2009
Games record	Lauren Boyle (NZL)	4:04.47	Glasgow, United Kingdom	29 July 2014

The following records were established during the competition:

Date	Event	Name	Nationality	Time	Record
10 April	Final	Ariarne Titmus	Australia	4:00.93	GR

== Results ==
=== Heats ===
The heats were held at 10:31.

Rank	Heat	Lane	Name	Nationality	Time	Notes
1	3	4	Ariarne Titmus	Australia	4:10.22	Q
2	3	5	Ellie Faulkner	England	4:11.19	Q
3	2	4	Holly Hibbott	England	4:11.65	Q
4	3	6	Mikkayla Sheridan	Australia	4:11.69	Q
5	2	2	Camilla Hattersley	Scotland	4:12.26	Q
6	2	5	Joanna Evans	Bahamas	4:12.38	Q
7	3	3	Jessica Ashwood	Australia	4:13.12	Q
8	2	1	Carina Doyle	New Zealand	4:13.33	Q
9	2	3	Mary-Sophie Harvey	Canada	4:14.26	
10	3	2	Hannah Miley	Scotland	4:14.62	
11	2	7	Dune Coetzee	South Africa	4:15.21	
12	3	8	Kate Beavon	Canada	4:17.59	
13	2	6	Ellena Jones	Wales	4:18.92	
14	3	7	Abbie Houston	Scotland	4:19.52	
15	3	1	Kristin Bellingan	South Africa	4:20.92	
16	2	8	Gemma Atherley	Jersey	4:22.55	
17	1	5	Matelita Buadromo	Fiji	4:31.60	
18	1	4	Makaela Holowchak	Antigua and Barbuda	4:41.90	
19	1	3	Alison Jackson	Cayman Islands	4:42.01	
20	1	6	Theresa Soukup	Seychelles	4:45.35	
21	1	2	Aliah Maginley	Antigua and Barbuda	5:09.66	

=== Final ===
The final was held at 19:37.

Rank	Lane	Name	Nationality	Time	Notes
1st place, gold medalist(s)	4	Ariarne Titmus	Australia	4:00.93	GR, OC
2nd place, silver medalist(s)	3	Holly Hibbott	England	4:05.31	
3rd place, bronze medalist(s)	5	Ellie Faulkner	England	4:07.35	
4	7	Joanna Evans	Bahamas	4:08.82	
5	1	Jessica Ashwood	Australia	4:10.32	
6	6	Mikkayla Sheridan	Australia	4:12.05	
7	2	Camilla Hattersley	Scotland	4:12.24	
8	8	Carina Doyle	New Zealand	4:15.89	
