= Swimming at the 2018 Commonwealth Games – Women's 4 × 200 metre freestyle relay =

Women's 4 × 200 metre freestyle relay at the 2018 Commonwealth Games
- Venue: Gold Coast Aquatic Centre
- Dates: 7 April
- Competitors: 24 from 6 nations
- Winning time: 7:48.04

Medalists
gold medal	Emma McKeon; Brianna Throssell; Leah Neale; Ariarne Titmus	Australia
silver medal	Penny Oleksiak; Kayla Sanchez; Rebecca Smith; Taylor Ruck	Canada
bronze medal	Eleanor Faulkner; Siobhan-Marie O'Connor; Freya Anderson; Holly Hibbott	England

The women's 4 × 200 metre freestyle relay event at the 2018 Commonwealth Games was held on 7 April at the Gold Coast Aquatic Centre.

== Records ==
Prior to this competition, the existing world and Commonwealth Games records were as follows.

World record	China (CHN)	7:42.08	Rome, Italy	30 July 2009
Commonwealth record	Australia (AUS)	7:44.31	Beijing, China	14 August 2008
Games record	Australia	7:49.90	Glasgow, United Kingdom	26 July 2014

The following records were established during the competition:

Date	Event	Nation	Swimmers	Time	Record
7 April	Final	Australia	Emma McKeon (1:56.62); Brianna Throssell (1:57.60); Leah Neale (1:58.23); Ariarne Titmus (1:55.59)	7:48.04	GR

== Results ==
The final was held at 21:50.

Rank	Lane	Nation	Swimmers	Time	Notes
1st place, gold medalist(s)	4	Australia	Emma McKeon (1:56.62); Brianna Throssell (1:57.60); Leah Neale (1:58.23); Ariarne Titmus (1:55.59)	7:48.04	GR
2nd place, silver medalist(s)	5	Canada	Penny Oleksiak (1:58.03); Kayla Sanchez (1:59.30); Rebecca Smith (1:57.19); Taylor Ruck (1:55.14)	7:49.66	
3rd place, bronze medalist(s)	3	England	Eleanor Faulkner (1:58.75); Siobhan-Marie O'Connor (1:57.07); Freya Anderson (2:00.41); Holly Hibbott (1:59.37)	7:55.60	
4	2	Scotland	Lucy Hope (2:00.50); Camilla Hattersley (1:58.17); Abbie Houston (2:02.65); Hannah Miley (2:00.23)	8:01.55	
5	6	Wales	Kathryn Greenslade (1:59.95); Ellena Jones (2:01.00); Jazmin Carlin (1:59.47); Chloé Tutton (2:02.58)	8:03.00	
6	7	South Africa	Marlies Ross (2:04.20); Dune Coetzee (2:03.32); Kristin Bellingan (2:07.49); Kate Beavon (2:03.30)	8:18.31	
