= Swimming at the 2018 Commonwealth Games – Women's 800 metre freestyle =

Women's 800 metre freestyle at the 2018 Commonwealth Games
- Venue: Gold Coast Aquatic Centre
- Dates: 8 April (heats); 9 April (final)
- Competitors: 10 from 6 nations
- Winning time: 8:20.02

Medalists
gold medal	Ariarne Titmus	Australia
silver medal	Jessica Ashwood	Australia
bronze medal	Kiah Melverton	Australia

The women's 800 metre freestyle event at the 2018 Commonwealth Games took place on 8 and 9 April at the Gold Coast Aquatic Centre.

== Records ==
Prior to this competition, the existing world, Commonwealth and Games records were as follows:

World record	Katie Ledecky (USA)	8:04.79	Rio de Janeiro, Brazil	12 August 2016
Commonwealth record	Rebecca Adlington (ENG)	8:14.10	Beijing, China	16 August 2008
Games record	Jazmin Carlin (WAL)	8:18.11	Glasgow, Scotland	28 July 2014

== Schedule ==
The schedule is as follows:

All times are Australian Eastern Standard Time (UTC+10)

Date	Time	Round
Sunday 8 April 2018	12:00	Heats
Monday 9 April 2018	19:43	Final

== Results ==
=== Heats ===
Rank	Heat	Lane	Name	Nationality	Time	Notes
1	1	4	Jessica Ashwood	Australia	8:29.30	Q
2	2	4	Ariarne Titmus	Australia	8:32.78	Q
3	1	3	Camilla Hattersley	Scotland	8:35.62	Q
4	2	5	Jazmin Carlin	Wales	8:36.52	Q
5	1	5	Holly Hibbott	England	8:39.57	Q
6	2	3	Kiah Melverton	Australia	8:42.01	Q
7	2	6	Ellena Jones	Wales	8:43.89	Q
8	1	6	Kate Beavon	South Africa	8:49.16	Q
9	2	2	Kristin Bellingan	South Africa	9:02.88	
10	1	2	Alania Suttie	Samoa	DNS	

=== Final ===
Rank	Lane	Name	Nationality	Time	Notes
1st place, gold medalist(s)	5	Ariarne Titmus	Australia	8:20.02	
2nd place, silver medalist(s)	4	Jessica Ashwood	Australia	8:27.60	
3rd place, bronze medalist(s)	7	Kiah Melverton	Australia	8:28.59	
4	2	Holly Hibbott	England	8:29.05	
5	3	Camilla Hattersley	Scotland	8:32.65	
6	6	Jazmin Carlin	Wales	8:37.45	
7	1	Ellena Jones	Wales	8:43.94	
8	8	Kate Beavon	South Africa	8:49.16	
