= Bahamas at the 2018 Commonwealth Games =

- Flag of the Bahamas
- CGF code: BAH
- CGA: Bahamas Olympic Committee
- Website: bahamasolympiccommittee.org

in Gold Coast, Australia 4 April 2018 – 15 April 2018
- Competitors: 31 in 7 sports
- Flag bearer: Joanna Evans (opening)
- Medals Ranked 21st: Gold 1 Silver 3 Bronze 0 Total 4

Commonwealth Games appearances (overview)
- 1954; 1958; 1962; 1966; 1970; 1974; 1978; 1982; 1986; 1990; 1994; 1998; 2002; 2006; 2010; 2014; 2018; 2022; 2026; 2030

The Bahamas competed at the 2018 Commonwealth Games in the Gold Coast, Australia from April 4 to April 15, 2018. The Bahamas sent a squad of 31 athletes. It was the Bahamas's 15th appearance at the Commonwealth Games.

Swimmer Joanna Evans was the island's flag bearer during the opening ceremony.

== Medalists ==
Medal	Name	Sport	Event	Date
Gold	Shaunae Miller-Uibo	Athletics	Women's 200 m	April 12
Silver	Jamal Wilson	Athletics	Men's High Jump	April 11
Silver	Jeffrey Gibson	Athletics	Men's 400 m Hurdles	April 12
Silver	O'Jay Ferguson; Stephen Newbold; Alonzo Russell; Teray Smith; Michael Mathieu; Ramon Miller	Athletics	Men's 4 × 400 m Relay	April 14

== Competitors ==
The following is the list of number of competitors participating at the Games per sport/discipline.

Sport	Men	Women	Total
Athletics	12	7	19
Boxing	2	0	2
Cycling	2	0	2
Swimming	2	2	4
Table tennis	1	0	1
Triathlon	1	0	1
Wrestling	2	0	2
Total	22	9	31

== Athletics ==
The Bahamas announced a team of 19 athletes (12 men, 7 women) that would compete at the 2018 Commonwealth Games.

Men
Track & road events

Athlete	Event	Heat		Semifinal		Final	
Athlete	Event	Result	Rank	Result	Rank	Result	Rank
Warren Fraser	100 m	10.37	2 Q	10.44	8	Did not advance	
Shavez Hart	100 m	10.53	3	Did not advance			
Shavez Hart	200 m	DNS		Did not advance			
Teray Smith	200 m	20.82	2 Q	20.71	4	Did not advance	
Michael Mathieu	400 m	46.97	5 q	47.44	8	Did not advance	
Jeffrey Gibson	400 m hurdles	49.75	2 Q	—		49.10	2nd place, silver medalist(s)
O'Jay Ferguson; Stephen Newbold; Alonzo Russell; Teray Smith; Michael Mathieu*; Ramon Miller*	4 × 400 m relay	3:04.62	3 Q	—		3:01.92	2nd place, silver medalist(s)

* Competed in heats only.

Field events

Athlete	Event	Qualification		Final	
Athlete	Event	Distance	Rank	Distance	Rank
Latario Collie-Minns	Triple jump	15.98	11 q	15.90	12
Donald Thomas	High jump	2.21	11 q	2.27	4
Jamal Wilson	High jump	2.21	1 q	2.30	2nd place, silver medalist(s)

Women
Track & road events

Athlete	Event	Heat		Semifinal		Final	
Athlete	Event	Result	Rank	Result	Rank	Result	Rank
V'Alonee Robinson	100 m	11.73 SB	5 q	12.09	8	Did not advance	
Shaunae Miller-Uibo	200 m	22.95	1 Q	22.48	1 Q	22.09	1st place, gold medalist(s)
Anthonique Strachan	200 m	23.52	4 Q	23.62	4	Did not advance	
Katrina Seymour	400 m hurdles	55.69 NR	5	Did not advance			
Tynia Gaither; Shaunae Miller-Uibo; Tamara Myers; V'Alonee Robinson; Anthonique Strachan	4 × 100 m relay	—				DNS	

Field events

Athlete	Event	Qualification		Final	
Athlete	Event	Distance	Rank	Distance	Rank
Bianca Stuart	Long jump	6.27	11 q	6.30	8
Tamara Myers	Triple jump	—		13.15	9

== Boxing ==
The Bahamas announced a team of 2 athletes (2 men) that would compete at the 2018 Commonwealth Games.

Men

Athlete	Event	Round of 32	Round of 16	Quarterfinals	Semifinals	Final	Rank
Athlete	Event	Opposition Result	Opposition Result	Opposition Result	Opposition Result	Opposition Result	Rank
Rashield Williams	−64 kg	Jonas Jonas (NAM); L 0–5	Did not advance				
Carl Hield	−69 kg	Terry Nickolas (AUS); L 0–5	Did not advance				

== Cycling ==
The Bahamas announced a team of 2 athletes (2 men) that would compete at the 2018 Commonwealth Games.

=== Road ===
Men

Athlete	Event	Time	Rank
Anthony Colebrook	Road race	DNF	
Anthony Colebrook	Time trial	1:10:59.85	52
Jay Major	Road race	DNF	

== Swimming ==
The Bahamas announced a team of 4 athletes (2 men, 2 women) that would compete at the 2018 Commonwealth Games.

Men

Athlete	Event	Heat		Semifinal		Final	
Athlete	Event	Time	Rank	Time	Rank	Time	Rank
Izaak Bastian	50 m freestyle	24.07	31	Did not advance			
Izaak Bastian	50 m breaststroke	29.39	15 Q	29.28	15	Did not advance	
Izaak Bastian	200 m individual medley	2:12.87	21	—		Did not advance	
N'Nyhn Fernander	100 m freestyle	DNS		Did not advance			
N'Nyhn Fernander	50 m butterfly	25.39	28	Did not advance			
N'Nyhn Fernander	100 m butterfly	DNS		Did not advance			

Women

Athlete	Event	Heat		Semifinal		Final	
Athlete	Event	Time	Rank	Time	Rank	Time	Rank
Joanna Evans	200 m freestyle	2:01.75	12	—		Did not advance	
Joanna Evans	400 m freestyle	4:12.38	6 Q	—		4:08.82	4
Lillian Higgs	100 m breaststroke	1:12.78	22	Did not advance			
Lillian Higgs	200 m breaststroke	2:42.65	16	—		Did not advance	

== Table tennis ==
The Bahamas announced a team of 1 athlete (1 man) that would compete at the 2018 Commonwealth Games.

Athletes	Event	Group stage			Round of 64	Round of 32	Round of 16	Quarterfinal	Semifinal	Final	Rank
Athletes	Event	Opposition Score	Opposition Score	Rank	Opposition Score	Opposition Score	Opposition Score	Opposition Score	Opposition Score	Opposition Score	Rank
Adrian Rollins	Men's singles	Sirisena (SRI); L 0 - 4	Lulu (VAN); L 0 - 4	3	Did not advance						

== Triathlon ==
The Bahamas announced a team of 1 athlete (1 man) that would compete at the 2018 Commonwealth Games.

Athlete	Event	Swim (750 m)	Trans 1	Bike (20 km)	Trans 2	Run (5 km)	Total	Rank
Cameron Roach	Men's	11:19	0:48	35:35	0:36	23:13	1:11:31	33

== Wrestling ==
Bahamas participated with 2 athletes (2 men).

Men

Athlete	Event	Round of 16	Quarterfinal	Semifinal	Repechage	Final / BM	
Athlete	Event	Opposition Result	Opposition Result	Opposition Result	Opposition Result	Opposition Result	Rank
Sean Wrinkle	-74 kg	Evans (AUS); L 0 - 5	Did not advance				12
Rashji Mackey	-86 kg	Wallen (JAM); L 1 - 3	Did not advance				8
