= Swimming at the 2018 Commonwealth Games – Women's 200 metre freestyle =

Women's 200 metre freestyle at the 2018 Commonwealth Games
- Venue: Gold Coast Aquatic Centre
- Dates: 5 April 2018
- Competitors: 21 from 12 nations
- Winning time: 1:54.81

Medalists
gold medal	Taylor Ruck	Canada
silver medal	Ariarne Titmus	Australia
bronze medal	Emma McKeon	Australia

The Women's 200 metre freestyle event at the 2018 Commonwealth Games was held on 5 April at the Gold Coast Aquatic Centre.

== Records ==
Prior to this competition, the existing world, Commonwealth and Games records were as follows:

World record	Federica Pellegrini (ITA)	1:52.98	Rome, Italy	29 July 2009
Commonwealth record	Emma McKeon (AUS)	1:54.83	Adelaide, Australia	10 April 2016
Games record	Emma McKeon (AUS)	1:55.57	Glasgow, United Kingdom	24 July 2014

The following records were established during the competition:

Date	Event	Name	Nationality	Time	Record
5 April	Final	Taylor Ruck	Canada	1:54.81	CR, GR

== Schedule ==
The schedule is as follows:

All times are Australian Eastern Standard Time (UTC+10)

Date	Time	Round
Thursday 5 April 2018	11:00	Qualifying
Thursday 5 April 2018	20:04	Final

== Results ==
=== Heats ===
Rank	Heat	Lane	Name	Nationality	Time	Notes
1	2	4	Ariarne Titmus	Australia	1:57.02	Q
2	3	4	Emma McKeon	Australia	1:57.40	Q
3	3	5	Taylor Ruck	Canada	1:57.44	Q
4	1	4	Eleanor Faulkner	England	1:57.87	Q
5	3	6	Holly Hibbott	England	1:58.10	Q
6	1	5	Penny Oleksiak	Canada	1:58.21	Q
7	2	5	Leah Neale	Australia	1:58.91	Q
8	3	3	Lucy Hope	Scotland	1:59.18	Q
9	3	3	Kathryn Greenslade	Wales	1:59.66	
10	2	6	Carina Doyle	New Zealand	2:00.01	
11	1	6	Ellena Jones	Wales	2:01.47	
12	1	3	Joanna Evans	Bahamas	2:01.75	
13	2	7	Gemma Atherley	Jersey	2:03.64	
14	3	2	Dune Coetzee	South Africa	2:04.15	
15	1	2	Kristin Bellingan	South Africa	2:04.37	
16	3	7	Lauren Hew	Cayman Islands	2:07.21	
17	2	2	Marlies Ross	South Africa	2:08.29	
18	3	1	Alison Jackson	Cayman Islands	2:12.08	
19	1	7	Makaela Holowchak	Antigua and Barbuda	2:14.01	
20	2	1	Theresa Soukup	Seychelles	2:15.63	
21	1	1	Aliah Maginley	Antigua and Barbuda	2:25.35	

=== Final ===
Rank	Lane	Name	Nationality	Time	Notes
1st place, gold medalist(s)	3	Taylor Ruck	Canada	1:54.81	CR, GR
2nd place, silver medalist(s)	4	Ariarne Titmus	Australia	1:54.85	
3rd place, bronze medalist(s)	5	Emma McKeon	Australia	1:56.26	
4	6	Eleanor Faulkner	England	1:57.72	
5	2	Holly Hibbott	England	1:58.55	
6	1	Leah Neale	Australia	1:58.76	
7	7	Penny Oleksiak	Canada	1:59.55	
8	8	Lucy Hope	Scotland	1:59.58	
