= Swimming at the 2018 Commonwealth Games – Women's 200 metre breaststroke =

Women's 200 metre breaststroke at the 2018 Commonwealth Games
- Venue: Gold Coast Aquatic Centre
- Dates: 7 April
- Competitors: 16 from 8 nations
- Winning time: 2:22.02

Medalists
gold medal	Tatjana Schoenmaker	South Africa
silver medal	Molly Renshaw	England
bronze medal	Chloé Tutton	Wales

The women's 200 metre breaststroke event at the 2018 Commonwealth Games was held on 7 April at the Gold Coast Aquatic Centre.

== Records ==
Prior to this competition, the existing world, Commonwealth and Games records were as follows:

World record	Rikke Møller Pedersen (DEN)	2:19.11	Barcelona, Spain	1 August 2013
Commonwealth record	Annamay Pierse (CAN)	2:20.12	Rome, Italy	30 July 2009
Games record	Leisel Jones (AUS)	2:20.72	Melbourne, Australia	18 March 2006

== Results ==
=== Heats ===
The heats were held at 10:40.

Rank	Heat	Lane	Name	Nationality	Time	Notes
1	3	3	Tatjana Schoenmaker	South Africa	2:23.57	Q
2	2	4	Taylor McKeown	Australia	2:25.04	Q
3	2	5	Chloé Tutton	Wales	2:25.08	Q
4	1	4	Kierra Smith	Canada	2:25.33	Q
5	3	5	Molly Renshaw	England	2:25.55	Q
6	1	5	Tessa Wallace	Australia	2:26.86	Q
7	1	6	Kaylene Corbett	South Africa	2:27.68	Q
8	3	6	Hannah Miley	Scotland	2:28.01	Q, WD
9	3	2	Emily Visagie	South Africa	2:28.37	Q
10	1	3	Georgia Bohl	Australia	2:28.90	
11	2	3	Mary-Sophie Harvey	Canada	2:29.26	
12	3	4	Jocelyn Ulyett	England	2:29.54	
13	2	6	Sarah Darcel	Canada	2:29.70	
14	2	2	Beth Sloan	Wales	2:29.94	
15	3	7	Niamh Robinson	Isle of Man	2:32.94	
16	1	2	Lillian Higgs	Bahamas	2:42.65	
	2	7	Aliah Maginley	Antigua and Barbuda	DNS	

=== Final ===
The final was held at 21:09.

Rank	Lane	Name	Nationality	Time	Notes
1st place, gold medalist(s)	4	Tatjana Schoenmaker	South Africa	2:22.02	AF
2nd place, silver medalist(s)	2	Molly Renshaw	England	2:23.28	
3rd place, bronze medalist(s)	3	Chloé Tutton	Wales	2:23.42	
4	6	Kierra Smith	Canada	2:23.62	
5	5	Taylor McKeown	Australia	2:25.51	
6	7	Tessa Wallace	Australia	2:26.59	
7	8	Emily Visagie	South Africa	2:29.25	
8	1	Kaylene Corbett	South Africa	2:29.40	
