= Athletics at the 2018 Commonwealth Games – Men's 100 metres (T12) =

Men's 100 metres (T12) at the 2018 Commonwealth Games
- Venue: Carrara Stadium
- Dates: 12 April
- Competitors: 8 (plus 2 guides) from 7 nations
- Winning time: 11.02

Medalists
gold medal	Jonathan Ntutu	South Africa
silver medal	Hilton Langenhoven	South Africa
bronze medal	Afiq Ali Hanafiah	Malaysia

The men's 100 metres (T12) at the 2018 Commonwealth Games, as part of the athletics programme, took place in the Carrara Stadium on 12 April 2018. The event was open to para-sport athletes competing under the T11 / T12 classifications.

== Records ==
Prior to this competition, the existing world and Games records were as follows:

World record	David Brown (USA)	10.92 (T11)	Walnut, United States	18 April 2014
World record	Elchin Muradov (AZE)	10.66 (T12)	Imola, Italy	19 June 2010
Games record	No previous mark			

== Schedule ==
The schedule was as follows:

Date	Time	Round
Thursday 12 April 2018	11:50	First round
Thursday 12 April 2018	20:21	Final

All times are Australian Eastern Standard Time (UTC+10)

== Results ==
=== First round ===
The first round consisted of two heats. The winner of each heat (plus two fastest losers) advanced to the final.

Heat 1

Rank	Lane	Name	Sport Class	Reaction Time	Result	Notes	Qual.
1	4	Hilton Langenhoven (RSA)	T12	0.182	11.27	=SB	Q
2	2	Zac Shaw (ENG)	T12	0.183	11.58		
3	8	James Ledger (WAL)	T12	0.162	11.77		
4	6	George Quarcoo (CAN); Adam Johnson (guide)	T12	0.160	14.03		
					Wind: +1.4 m/s		

Heat 2

Rank	Lane	Name	Sport Class	Reaction Time	Result	Notes	Qual.
1	2	Jonathan Ntutu (RSA)	T12	0.193	10.80	GR, SB	Q
2	8	Afiq Ali Hanafiah (MAS)	T12	0.158	11.20		q
3	4	Ananias Shikongo (NAM); Even Tjiviju (guide)	T11	0.176	11.26	GR, SB	q
4	6	Jason Brown (JAM)	T12	0.160	11.49		
					Wind: +1.5 m/s		

=== Final ===
The medals were determined in the final.

Rank	Lane	Name	Sport Class	Reaction Time	Result	Notes
1st place, gold medalist(s)	6	Jonathan Ntutu (RSA)	T12	0.177	11.02	
2nd place, silver medalist(s)	4	Hilton Langenhoven (RSA)	T12	0.150	11.27	=SB
3rd place, bronze medalist(s)	8	Afiq Ali Hanafiah (MAS)	T12	0.133	11.28	
4	2	Ananias Shikongo (NAM); Even Tjiviju (guide)	T11	0.162	11.37	
					Wind: 0.0 m/s	
