= Swimming at the 2018 Commonwealth Games – Men's 200 metre breaststroke =

Men's 200 metre breaststroke at the 2018 Commonwealth Games
- Venue: Gold Coast Aquatic Centre
- Dates: 5 April
- Competitors: 16 from 10 nations
- Winning time: 2:08.05

Medalists
| gold medal | James Wilby | England |
| silver medal | Ross Murdoch | Scotland |
| bronze medal | Matt Wilson | Australia |

The men's 200 metre breaststroke event at the 2018 Commonwealth Games was held on 5 April at the Gold Coast Aquatic Centre.

== Records ==
Prior to this competition, the existing world, Commonwealth and Games records were as follows:

| World record | Ippei Watanabe (JPN) | 2:06.67 | Tokyo, Japan | 29 January 2017 |
| Commonwealth record | Ross Murdoch (SCO) | 2:07.30 | Glasgow, United Kingdom | 24 July 2014 |
| Games record | Ross Murdoch (SCO) | 2:07.30 | Glasgow, United Kingdom | 24 July 2014 |

== Schedule ==
The schedule is as follows:

All times are Australian Eastern Standard Time (UTC+10)

| Date | Time | Round |
|---|---|---|
| Thursday 5 April 2018 | 12:07 | Qualifying |
| Thursday 5 April 2018 | 21:44 | Final |

== Results ==
=== Heats ===
| Rank | Heat | Lane | Name | Nationality | Time | Notes |
|---|---|---|---|---|---|---|
| 1 | 2 | 4 | Ross Murdoch | Scotland | 2:08.77 | Q |
| 2 | 1 | 4 | Matt Wilson | Australia | 2:09.74 | Q |
| 3 | 2 | 3 | James Wilby | England | 2:10.07 | Q |
| 4 | 2 | 5 | Andrew Willis | England | 2:10.52 | Q |
| 5 | 2 | 2 | Calum Tait | Scotland | 2:10.83 | Q |
| 6 | 1 | 2 | Elijah Wall | Canada | 2:11.47 | Q |
| 7 | 2 | 6 | George Harley | Australia | 2:11.62 | Q |
| 8 | 1 | 5 | Craig Benson | Scotland | 2:12.13 | Q |
| 9 | 1 | 6 | Ayrton Sweeney | South Africa | 2:13.27 | |
| 10 | 1 | 3 | Zac Stubblety-Cook | Australia | 2:15.71 | |
| 11 | 2 | 7 | Luan Grobbelaar | South Africa | 2:18.90 | |
| 12 | 1 | 7 | Taichi Vakasama Taichi | Fiji | 2:21.07 | |
| 13 | 2 | 1 | Jonathan Chung Yee | Mauritius | 2:22.71 | |
| 14 | 1 | 1 | Leonard Kalate | Papua New Guinea | 2:30.23 | |
| 15 | 2 | 8 | Samuele Rossi | Seychelles | 2:32.99 | |
| 16 | 1 | 8 | Jadon Wuilliez | Antigua and Barbuda | 2:39.88 | |

=== Final ===
| Rank | Lane | Name | Nationality | Time | Notes |
|---|---|---|---|---|---|
| 1st place, gold medalist(s) | 3 | James Wilby | England | 2:08.05 | |
| 2nd place, silver medalist(s) | 4 | Ross Murdoch | Scotland | 2:08.32 | |
| 3rd place, bronze medalist(s) | 5 | Matt Wilson | Australia | 2:08.64 | |
| 4 | 6 | Andrew Willis | England | 2:09.31 | |
| 5 | 1 | George Harley | Australia | 2:10.04 | |
| 6 | 8 | Craig Benson | Scotland | 2:10.09 | |
| 7 | 2 | Calum Tait | Scotland | 2:11.67 | |
| 8 | 7 | Elijah Wall | Canada | 2:11.94 | |
