= Swimming at the 2018 Commonwealth Games – Women's 400 metre individual medley =

Event held on 5 April at the Gold Coast Aquatic Centre

Women's 400 metre individual medley at the 2018 Commonwealth Games
- Venue: Gold Coast Aquatic Centre
- Dates: 5 April
- Competitors: 12 from 6 nations
- Winning time: 4:34.90

Medalists
gold medal	Aimee Willmott	England
silver medal	Hannah Miley	Scotland
bronze medal	Blair Evans	Australia

The women's 400 metre individual medley event at the 2018 Commonwealth Games was held on 5 April at the Gold Coast Aquatic Centre.

== Records ==
Prior to this competition, the existing world, Commonwealth and Games records were as follows:

World record	Katinka Hosszú (HUN)	4:26.36	Rio de Janeiro, Brazil	6 August 2016
Commonwealth record	Stephanie Rice (AUS)	4:29.45	Beijing, China	10 August 2008
Games record	Hannah Miley (SCO)	4:31.76	Glasgow, United Kingdom	24 July 2014

== Schedule ==
The schedule is as follows:

All times are Australian Eastern Standard Time (UTC+10)

Date	Time	Round
Thursday 5 April 2018	10:31	Qualifying
Thursday 5 April 2018	19:37	Final

== Results ==
=== Heats ===
Rank	Heat	Lane	Name	Nationality	Time	Notes
1	2	4	Hannah Miley	Scotland	4:38.20	Q
2	2	5	Aimee Willmott	England	4:39.19	Q
3	1	2	Meg Bailey	Australia	4:41.51	Q
4	1	3	Blair Evans	Australia	4:41.54	Q
5	2	2	Sarah Darcel	Canada	4:41.55	Q
6	1	6	Erika Seltenreich-Hodgson	Canada	4:41.81	Q
7	1	4	Mary-Sophie Harvey	Canada	4:43.40	Q
8	1	5	Abbie Wood	England	4:44.39	Q
9	2	6	Kaylee McKeown	Australia	4:46.13	
10	2	3	Rosie Rudin	England	4:47.50	
11	2	7	Marlies Ross	South Africa	4:55.30	
12	1	7	Alania Suttie	Samoa	5:23.97	

=== Final ===
Rank	Lane	Name	Nationality	Time	Notes
1st place, gold medalist(s)	5	Aimee Willmott	England	4:34.90	
2nd place, silver medalist(s)	4	Hannah Miley	Scotland	4:35.16	
3rd place, bronze medalist(s)	6	Blair Evans	Australia	4:38.23	
4	7	Erika Seltenreich-Hodgson	Canada	4:38.51	
5	2	Sarah Darcel	Canada	4:39.43	
6	8	Abbie Wood	England	4:40.55	
7	3	Meg Bailey	Australia	4:41.46	
8	1	Mary-Sophie Harvey	Canada	4:43.51	
