= Swimming at the 2018 Commonwealth Games – Women's 200 metre backstroke =

Women's 200 metre backstroke at the 2018 Commonwealth Games
- Venue: Gold Coast Aquatic Centre
- Dates: 8 April
- Competitors: 16 from 8 nations
- Winning time: 2:05.98

Medalists
gold medal	Kylie Masse	Canada
silver medal	Taylor Ruck	Canada
bronze medal	Emily Seebohm	Australia

The women's 200 metre backstroke event at the 2018 Commonwealth Games was held on 8 April at the Gold Coast Aquatic Centre.

== Records ==
Prior to this competition, the existing world, Commonwealth and Games records were as follows:

World record	Missy Franklin (USA)	2:04.06	London, United Kingdom	3 August 2012
Commonwealth record	Emily Seebohm (AUS)	2:05.68	Budapest, Hungary	29 July 2017
Games record	Belinda Hocking (AUS)	2:07.24	Glasgow, United Kingdom	27 July 2014

The following records were established during the competition:

Date	Event	Name	Nationality	Time	Record
8 April	Final	Kylie Masse	Canada	2:05.98	GR

== Results ==
=== Heats ===
The heats were held at 10:31.

Rank	Heat	Lane	Name	Nation	Result	Notes
1	2	4	Kylie Masse	Canada	2:09.12	Q
2	2	5	Hilary Caldwell	Canada	2:10.27	Q
3	1	4	Kaylee McKeown	Australia	2:10.45	Q
4	1	3	Jessica Fullalove	England	2:11.51	Q
5	3	4	Emily Seebohm	Australia	2:11.68	Q
6	3	3	Elizabeth Simmonds	England	2:12.12	Q
7	3	5	Taylor Ruck	Canada	2:12.62	Q
8	1	5	Hayley Baker	Australia	2:12.71	Q
9	2	3	Chloe Golding	England	2:13.05	
10	2	6	Mariella Venter	South Africa	2:14.82	
11	1	6	Nathania van Niekerk	South Africa	2:16.07	
12	2	2	Gemma Atherley	Jersey	2:16.89	
13	3	2	Bobbi Gichard	New Zealand	2:17.88	
14	3	7	Aaliyah Palestrini	Seychelles	2:27.48	
15	1	2	Lauren Hew	Cayman Islands	2:27.88	
16	2	7	Therese Soukup	Seychelles	2:36.95	
	3	6	Kathryn Greenslade	Wales	DNS	

=== Final ===
The final was held at 19:37.

Rank	Lane	Name	Nation	Result	Notes
1st place, gold medalist(s)	4	Kylie Masse	Canada	2:05.98	GR
2nd place, silver medalist(s)	1	Taylor Ruck	Canada	2:06.42	
3rd place, bronze medalist(s)	2	Emily Seebohm	Australia	2:06.82	
4	3	Kaylee McKeown	Australia	2:07.86	
5	5	Hilary Caldwell	Canada	2:09.22	
6	8	Hayley Baker	Australia	2:11.28	
7	6	Jessica Fullalove	England	2:11.74	
8	7	Elizabeth Simmonds	England	2:12.40	
