= Athletics at the 2018 Commonwealth Games – Men's 100 metres (T38) =

Men's 100 metres (T38) at the 2018 Commonwealth Games
- Venue: Carrara Stadium
- Dates: 9 April
- Competitors: 8 from 5 nations
- Winning time: 11.09

Medalists
gold medal	Evan O'Hanlon	Australia
silver medal	Dyan Buis	South Africa
bronze medal	Charl du Toit	South Africa

The men's 100 metres (T38) at the 2018 Commonwealth Games, as part of the athletics programme, took place in the Carrara Stadium on 9 April 2018. The event was open to para-sport athletes competing under the T37 / T38 classifications.

== Records ==
Prior to this competition, the existing world records were as follows:

World record	Charl du Toit (RSA)	11.42 (T37)	Rio de Janeiro, Brazil	10 September 2016
World record	Hu Jianwen (CHN)	10.74 (T38)	Rio de Janeiro, Brazil	13 September 2016

== Schedule ==
The schedule was as follows:

Date	Time	Round
Monday 9 April 2018	19:10	Final

All times are Australian Eastern Standard Time (UTC+10)

== Results ==
With eight entrants, the event was held as a straight final.

=== Final ===
Rank	Lane	Name	Sport Class	Reaction Time	Result	Notes
1st place, gold medalist(s)	4	Evan O'Hanlon (AUS)	T38	0.149	11.09	
2nd place, silver medalist(s)	7	Dyan Buis (RSA)	T38	0.173	11.33	SB
3rd place, bronze medalist(s)	5	Charl du Toit (RSA)	T37	0.146	11.35	WR
4	2	Kyle Whitehouse (CAN)	T38	0.115	11.58	SB
5	3	Union Sekailwe (RSA)	T38	0.205	11.67	SB
6	8	Samuel Walker (AUS)	T38	0.153	11.80	SB
7	6	Rhys Jones (WAL)	T37	0.176	11.87	
8	9	Amar-Mazigh Aichoun (ENG)	T38	0.212	12.14	
					Wind: +0.8 m/s	
