= Swimming at the 2018 Commonwealth Games – Men's 100 metre breaststroke SB8 =

Men's 100 metre breaststroke SB8 at the 2018 Commonwealth Games
- Venue: Gold Coast Aquatic Centre
- Dates: 7 April 2018
- Competitors: 8 from 5 nations
- Winning time: 1:12.42

Medalists
gold medal	Timothy Disken	Australia
silver medal	Timothy Hodge	Australia
bronze medal	Blake Cochrane	Australia

The Men's 100 metre breaststroke SB8 event at the 2018 Commonwealth Games was held on 7 April at the Gold Coast Aquatic Centre.

== Schedule ==
The schedule is as follows:

All times are Australian Eastern Standard Time (UTC+10)

Date	Time	Round
Saturday 7 April 2018	6:29	Qualifying
Saturday 7 April 2018	16:46	Final

== Results ==
=== Heats ===
Rank	Lane	Name	Nationality	Time	Notes
1	4	Timothy Disken	Australia	1:13.87	Q
2	5	Timothy Hodge	Australia	1:17.02	Q
3	3	Blake Cochrane	Australia	1:19.81	Q
4	2	Jesse Reynolds	New Zealand	1:21.82	Q
5	1	Celyn Edwards	New Zealand	1:25.06	Q
6	7	Jacob Leach	England	1:26.17	Q
7	6	Kaleb van der Merwe	South Africa	1:28.26	Q
8	8	Philippe Vachon	Canada	1:30.28	Q

=== Final ===
Rank	Lane	Name	Nationality	Time	Notes
1st place, gold medalist(s)	4	Timothy Disken	Australia	1:12.42	
2nd place, silver medalist(s)	5	Timothy Hodge	Australia	1:15.80	
3rd place, bronze medalist(s)	3	Blake Cochrane	Australia	1:18.75	
4	6	Jesse Reynolds	New Zealand	1:21.65	
5	7	Jacob Leach	England	1:25.35	
6	2	Celyn Edwards	New Zealand	1:25.63	
7	1	Kaleb van der Merwe	South Africa	1:26.11	
8	8	Philippe Vachon	Canada	1:29.14	
