= Swimming at the 2018 Commonwealth Games – Men's 400 metre individual medley =

Men's 400 metre individual medley at the 2018 Commonwealth Games
- Venue: Gold Coast Aquatic Centre
- Dates: 6 April
- Competitors: 10 from 7 nations
- Winning time: 4:13.12

Medalists
gold medal	Clyde Lewis	Australia
silver medal	Mark Szaranek	Scotland
bronze medal	Lewis Clareburt	New Zealand

The men's 400 metre individual medley event at the 2018 Commonwealth Games was held on 6 April at the Gold Coast Aquatic Centre.

== Schedule ==
The schedule is as follows:

All times are Australian Eastern Standard Time (UTC+10)

Date	Time	Round
Friday 6 April 2018	11:26	Qualifying
Friday 6 April 2018	21:17	Final

== Records ==
Prior to this competition, the existing world, Commonwealth and Games records were as follows:

World record	Michael Phelps (USA)	4:03.84	Beijing, China	10 August 2008
Commonwealth record	Max Litchfield (GBR)	4:09.62	Budapest, Hungary	30 July 2017
Games record	Dan Wallace (SCO)	4:11.04	Glasgow, United Kingdom	25 July 2014

== Results ==
=== Heats ===
Rank	Heat	Lane	Name	Nation	Result	Notes
1	1	5	Clyde Lewis	Australia	4:17.25	Q
2	1	4	Ayrton Sweeney	South Africa	4:18.08	Q
3	2	4	Mark Szaranek	Scotland	4:18.47	Q
4	2	5	Tristan Cote	Canada	4:18.73	Q
5	1	6	Bradlee Ashby	New Zealand	4:18.83	Q
6	1	3	Lewis Clareburt	New Zealand	4:19.16	Q
7	2	6	Travis Mahoney	Australia	4:19.17	Q
8	2	3	Joe Litchfield	England	4:21.34	Q
9	2	2	Lun Grobbelaar	South Africa	4:22.77	
10	1	2	Brandon Schuster	Samoa	4:31.99	

=== Final ===
Rank	Lane	Name	Nation	Result	Notes
1st place, gold medalist(s)	4	Clyde Lewis	Australia	4:13.12	
2nd place, silver medalist(s)	3	Mark Szaranek	Scotland	4:13.72	
3rd place, bronze medalist(s)	7	Lewis Clareburt	New Zealand	4:14.42	NR
4	5	Ayrton Sweeney	South Africa	4:17.79	
5	2	Bradlee Ashby	New Zealand	4:18.61	
6	8	Joe Litchfield	England	4:19.41	
7	6	Tristan Cote	Canada	4:20.29	
8	1	Travis Mahoney	Australia	4:21.50	
