= Wrestling at the 2018 Commonwealth Games – Men's freestyle 74 kg =

Wrestling – Men's freestyle 74 kg at the 2018 Commonwealth Games
- Venue: Carrara Sports and Leisure Centre
- Dates: 12 April 2018
- Competitors: 15 from 15 nations

Medalists
gold medal	Sushil Kumar	India
silver medal	Johanes Botha	South Africa
bronze medal	Curtis Dodge	Wales
bronze medal	Jevon Balfour	Canada

The men's 74 kg freestyle wrestling competition at the 2018 Commonwealth Games in Gold Coast, Australia was held on 12 April at the Carrara Sports and Leisure Centre. Sushil Kumar from India won the gold medal and Johanes Botha from South Africa won the silver.

This freestyle wrestling competition consists of a single-elimination tournament, with a repechage used to determine the winner of two bronze medals. The two finalists face off for gold and silver medals. Each wrestler who loses to one of the two finalists moves into the repechage, culminating in a pair of bronze medal matches featuring the semifinal losers each facing the remaining repechage opponent from their half of the bracket.

== Results ==
Legend

- F — Won by fall

=== Main bracket ===
Round of 16
Mohammad Ali Amzad (BAN)	10
Loabo Teetu (KIR)	0
Johannes Botha (RSA)	12
Abdulai Salam (SLE)	2
Suresh Fernando (SRI)	0
Curtis Dodge (WAL)	6^{F}
Akash Khullar (NZL)	11
Jean Marianne (MRI)	0
Sean Wrinkle (BAH)	0
Connor Evans (AUS)	4^{F}
Muhammad Assad Butt (PAK)	10
Oleg Gladkov (SCO)	3
Jevon Balfour (CAN)	0
Sushil Kumar (IND)	11

Quarterfinals
Ebimienfaghe Assizecourt (NGR)	4^{F}
Mohammad Ali Amzad (BAN)	0
Johannes Botha (RSA)	10
Curtis Dodge (WAL)	0
Akash Khullar (NZL)	0
Connor Evans (AUS)	6^{F}
Muhammad Assad Butt (PAK)	0
Sushil Kumar (IND)	10

Semifinals
Ebimienfaghe Assizecourt (NGR)	8
Johannes Botha (RSA)	11^{F}
Connor Evans (AUS)	0
Sushil Kumar (IND)	4^{F}

Final
Johannes Botha (RSA)	0
Sushil Kumar (IND)	10

=== Repechage ===
Repechage first round
Abdulai Salam (SLE)	4
Curtis Dodge (WAL)	6^{F}
Jevon Balfour (CAN)	10
Muhammad Assad Butt (PAK)	0

Bronze medal match
Curtis Dodge (WAL)	6^{F}
Ebimienfaghe Assizecourt (NGR)	9
Jevon Balfour (CAN)	14
Connor Evans (AUS)	4
