= Simone Ackermann =

South African triathlete (born 1990)

Personal information
- Nationality: South African
- Born: 1 February 1990 (age 35); East London, South Africa

Sport
- Sport: Triathlon

Simone Ackermann (born 1 February 1990) is a South African triathlete. She competed in the women's event at the 2020 Summer Olympics.
