= Daniel Hunter (swimmer) =

New Zealand swimmer (born 1994)

Personal information
- National team: New Zealand
- Born: 28 June 1994 (age 31); Ōtāhuhu, New Zealand
- Height: 201 cm (6 ft 7 in) (2018)
- Weight: 93 kg (205 lb) (2018)

Sport
- Sport: Swimming

Daniel Hunter (born 28 June 1994) is a New Zealand swimmer. He specialises in the 100 m freestyle and 50 m freestyle events

Hunter swims for the Howick Pakuranga Swimming Club in Auckland. In 2016, he set New Zealand records for both 50m freestyle and 100m freestyle in both short course and long course.

Hunter competed in the 50m freestyle and 100m freestyle of the 2016 world short course championships in Windsor, Ontario, making the semi-finals in the 50m event.
