= Sam Perry (swimmer) =

New Zealand swimmer

Personal information
- Born: 16 August 1995 (age 30) Hamilton, New Zealand

Sport
- Sport: Swimming
- College team: Stanford University

Sam Perry (born 16 August 1995) is a New Zealand swimmer. He competed in the men's 100 metre freestyle event at the 2017 World Aquatics Championships.
