= David Morgan (swimmer) =

Australian swimmer

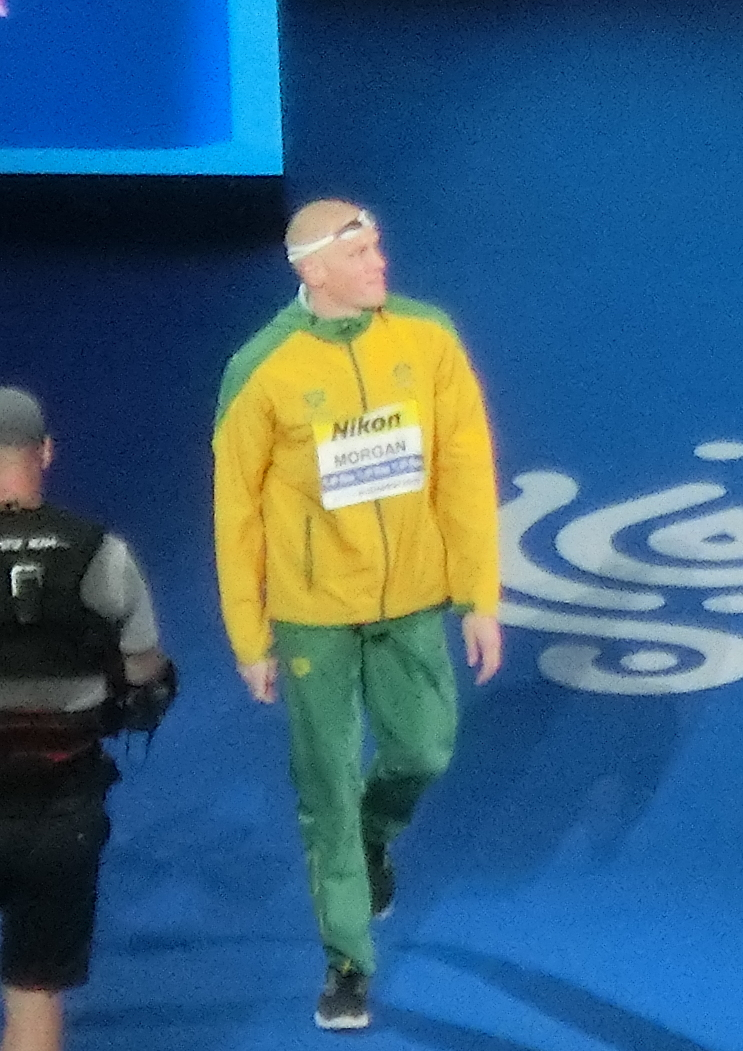

Personal information
- National team: Australia
- Born: 1 January 1994 (age 32) Cardiff, Wales
- Height: 1.84 m (6 ft 0 in)
- Weight: 82 kg (181 lb)

Sport
- Sport: Swimming
- Strokes: Butterfly
Medal record
Men's swimming
Representing Australia
Olympic Games
Bronze medal – third place	2016 Rio de Janeiro	4×100 m medley
World Championships (LC)
Silver medal – second place	2015 Kazan	4×100 m medley
World Championships (SC)
Silver medal – second place	2016 Windsor	4×100 m medley
Bronze medal – third place	2016 Windsor	50 m butterfly
Bronze medal – third place	2016 Windsor	100 m butterfly
Bronze medal – third place	2016 Windsor	4×100 m freestyle
Commonwealth Games
Silver medal – second place	2018 Gold Coast	200 m butterfly
Junior Pan Pacific Championships
Bronze medal – third place	2012 Honolulu	4×100 m medley

David Morgan (born 1 January 1994) is an Australian swimmer. He competed in the men's 200 metre butterfly and the 4 × 100 m medley and the 100 fly events at the 2016 Summer Olympics, winning bronze in the latter. He is the son of British Olympic swimmer Amanda James and nephew of British Olympic diver Bob Morgan.
