= Mackenzie Darragh =

Canadian competitive swimmer

Personal information
- Nickname: Mack
- National team: Canada
- Born: December 8, 1993 (age 32) Mississauga, Ontario, Canada

Sport
- Sport: Swimming
- Club: Toronto Titans (ISL 2020); NY Breakers (ISL 2019)
Medal record
Men's swimming
Representing Canada
World Junior Championships
Bronze medal – third place	2011 Lima	200 m butterfly

Mackenzie "Mack" Darragh (born December 8, 1993) is a Canadian competitive swimmer. He holds the Canadian record for the 200 m butterfly.

== Career ==
=== International Swimming League ===
Darragh signed to the NY Breakers for the ISL's inaugural season. In spring 2020, Darragh signed for Toronto Titans in their first ISL season.

=== World Championships ===
In 2016, Darragh was named to Canada's Olympic team for the 2016 Summer Olympics. At the 2011 World Junior Swimming Championships in Lima, Peru, Darragh won the bronze medal in 200 m butterfly.

=== Other ===
In September 2017, Darragh was named to Canada's 2018 Commonwealth Games team. Darragh was awarded All-American for 200 m butterfly in 2015.
