= Eben Vorster =

South African swimmer (born 1997)

Personal information
- Nationality: South African
- Born: 23 April 1997 (age 29) Bellville, South Africa
- Height: 192 cm (6 ft 4 in)
- Weight: 83 kg (183 lb)

Sport
- Sport: Swimming
- Strokes: Butterfly, freestyle
- College team: University of Pittsburgh
Medal record
Men's swimming
Representing South Africa
Event	1st	2nd	3rd
African Championships	2	0	0
Total	2	0	0
African Championships
Gold medal – first place	2016 Bloemfontein	200 m butterfly
Gold medal – first place	2016 Bloemfontein	4×100 m freestyle

Eben Vorster (born 23 April 1997) is a South African swimmer. He competed in the men's 200 metre freestyle event at the 2019 World Aquatics Championships.
