= Grant Irvine =

Australian swimmer

Personal information
- Nationality: Australia
- Born: 17 March 1991 (age 35) Brisbane, Queensland, Australia
- Height: 187 cm (6 ft 2 in)
- Weight: 80 kg (176 lb)

Sport
- Sport: Swimming
- Strokes: Butterfly
- Club: St Peters Western
- Coach: Michael Bohl
Medal record
Men's swimming
Representing Australia
World Championships (LC)
Silver medal – second place	2017 Budapest	4×100 m mixed medley
World Championships (SC)
Bronze medal – third place	2012 Istanbul	4×100 m medley
Pan Pacific Championships
Bronze medal – third place	2018 Tokyo	4×100 m medley
Commonwealth Games
Silver medal – second place	2014 Glasgow	200 m butterfly

Grant Irvine (born 17 March 1991) is an Australian butterfly swimmer. He was part of the 4 × 100 m medley team that won a bronze medal at the 2012 FINA World Swimming Championships (25 m). Two years later he won an individual silver in the 200 m butterfly at the Commonwealth Games.

At the 2016 Summer Olympics, Irvine represented Australia in the 200m butterfly.
