= Kate Beavon =

South African swimmer (born 2000)

Personal information
- Born: 17 April 2000 (age 25)

Sport
- Sport: Swimming

Kate Beavon (born 17 April 2000) is a South African swimmer. She competed in the women's 400 metre freestyle event at the 2017 World Aquatics Championships.
