= Gold Coast Aquatic Centre =

Swimming venue in Southport, Queensland

- Interactive map of Gold Coast Aquatic Centre
- Former names: Southport Pool; Southport Olympic Pool
- Location: Marine Parade, Southport, Queensland, 4215
- Coordinates: 27.963665°S 153.415854°E
- Owner: City of Gold Coast
- Type: Public swimming pool
- Facilities: Competition Pool; Diving Pool; Training Pool

Construction
- Opened: 1960s

Website
- www.goldcoast.qld.gov.au/thegoldcoast/gold-coast-aquatic-centre-23174.html/

The Gold Coast Aquatic Centre (also known as the Optus Aquatic Centre for the Gold Coast 2018 Commonwealth Games) is a public swimming pool complex located in the Southport Broadwater Parklands on the Gold Coast, Queensland. It was the swimming and diving facility for the 2018 Commonwealth Games.

== History ==
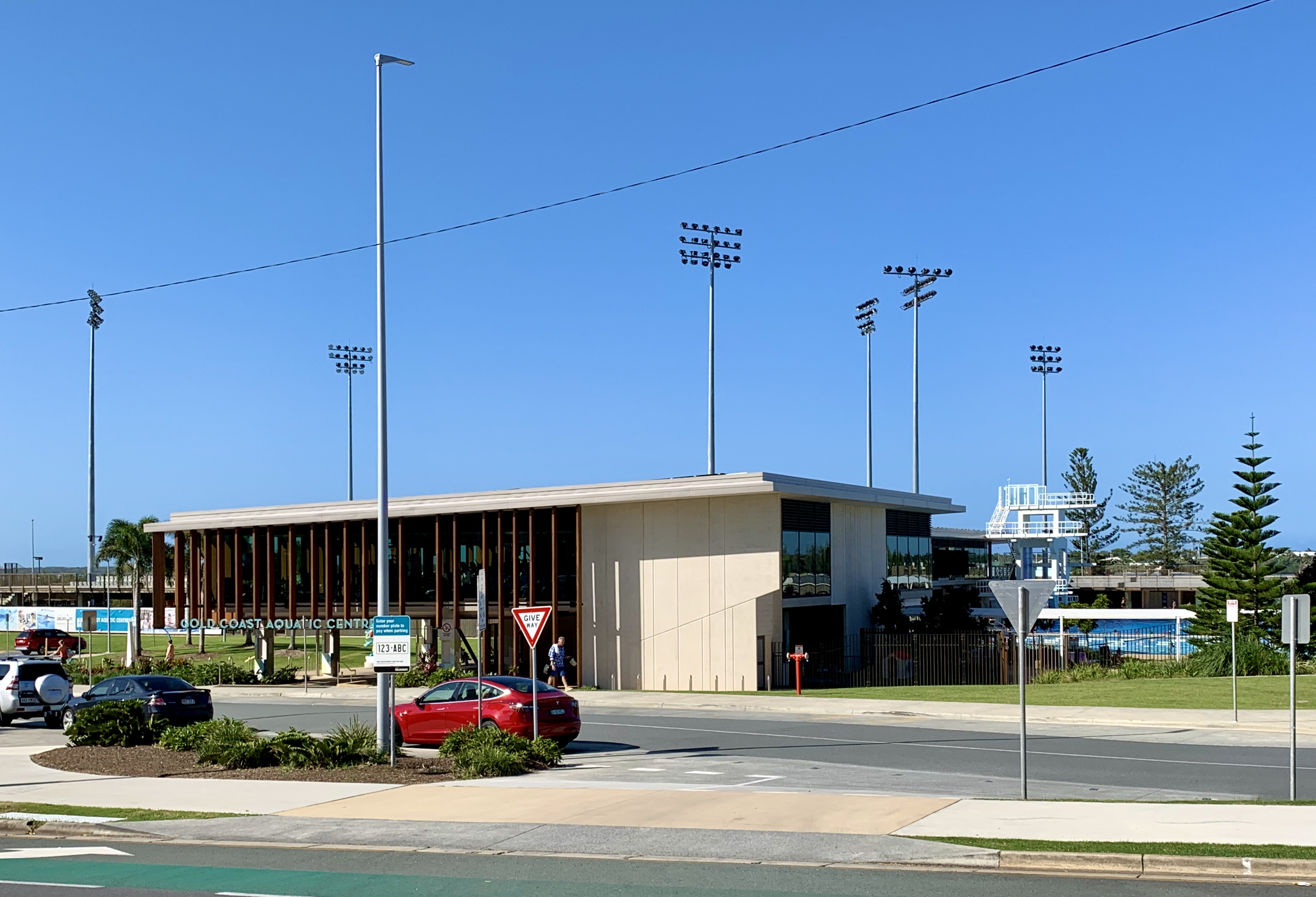
Gold Coast Aquatic Centre in 2020

The Gold Coast Aquatic Centre opened in the 1960s as the Southport Pool. The complex was renamed to the Gold Coast Aquatic Centre in the late 2000s. In 2018, the Gold Coast hosted the Commonwealth Games. The Gold Coast Aquatic Centre was the swimming and diving facility for the event. Approximately $40 million was spent on redeveloping the complex. The redevelopment included the construction of an additional 10-lane competition pool, additional change rooms and new meeting rooms. Although the expansion was expected to be completed by 2017, the construction was brought forward to allow the venue to host the Pan Pacific Swimming Championships in 2014. Work began on the redevelopment in March 2013.

The 2014 Pan Pacific Swimming Championships were held at the Gold Coast Aquatic Centre and were headlined by all-time record holder for Olympic gold medals Michael Phelps who won three gold medals.

== Facilities ==
Prior to the 2014 major refurbishment of the Centre, the Gold Coast Aquatic Centre had a number of facilities. These including:

- 50m x 21m wide Competition swimming pool - 8 lanes
- 33m x 21m wide Diving pool
- Diving platform located at various heights including 1m, 3m, 5m 7.5m 10m off the ground
- 25m x 20m wide training pool - 8-lane

During the 2014 refurbishment, additional water facilities were added as follows:

- New 50m x 25m wide Olympic standard Competition swimming pool - 10 lanes
- New 15m x 10m wide Indoor Learn To Swim pool
- New Freeform Splash pool with water play features

The refurbishment building design by Cox Rayner Architects has received the 2015 Queensland State Architecture Award for Public Architecture from the Australian Institute of Architects.

The refurbishment Aquatic design was Completed by Stevenson & Associates Pty Ltd.

== Programs ==
A number of programs and classes are based at the Gold Coast Aquatic Centre. These include:

- Aqua Aerobics
- Birthday Parties
- Deep Water Running
- Diving
- Learn To Swim
- Massage
- Physiotherapy
- Synchronised Swimming
- Underwater Hockey

Additionally, Competitive, Masters, and Triathlon Squads are based at the complex.

== See also ==
- Sports on the Gold Coast, Queensland
