= Australia at the 2018 Commonwealth Games =

- Flag of Australia
- CG code: AUS
- CGA: Commonwealth Games Australia
- Website: commonwealthgames.com.au

in Gold Coast, Australia 4 April 2018 – 15 April 2018
- Competitors: 469 in 18 sports
- Flag bearers: Mark Knowles (opening); Kurt Fearnley (closing)
- Medals Ranked 1st: Gold 80 Silver 59 Bronze 59 Total 198

Commonwealth Games appearances (overview)
- 1930; 1934; 1938; 1950; 1954; 1958; 1962; 1966; 1970; 1974; 1978; 1982; 1986; 1990; 1994; 1998; 2002; 2006; 2010; 2014; 2018; 2022; 2026; 2030

Australia competed at the 2018 Commonwealth Games in Gold Coast, Queensland between 4 and 15 April 2018. It was Australia's 21st appearance at the Commonwealth Games, having competed at every Games since their inception in 1930. Australia previously hosted the Games four times – 1938 Sydney, 1962 Perth, 1982 Brisbane and 2006 Melbourne.

Being the host nation, Australia sent a contingent of 474 athletes, participating in all of the 18 sports staged. Though only 469 competed. This was the highest number of athletes to represent Australia in a Commonwealth Games ever, eclipsing their previous record of 417 athletes at the 2014 Glasgow Commonwealth Games. Hockey athlete Mark Knowles was the country's flag bearer during the opening ceremony.

== Administration ==
Steve Moneghetti was appointed Chef de Mission. He held this position at the 2010 and 2014 Games. Opening ceremony appointments included: hockey player Mark Knowles as Australian flag bearer, lawn bowler Karen Murphy taking the athletes' oath and Australian netball coach Lisa Alexander the coaches' oath. Kurt Fearnley in his last major multi-sport competition was the closing ceremony flag bearer.

== Competitors ==
The following is the list of number of competitors participating at the Games per sport/discipline.

| Sport | Men | Women | Total |
|---|---|---|---|
| Athletics | 51 | 56 | 107 |
| Badminton | 5 | 5 | 10 |
| Basketball | 12 | 12 | 24 |
| Beach volleyball | 2 | 2 | 4 |
| Boxing | 8 | 5 | 13 |
| Cycling | 19 | 17 | 36 |
| Diving | 6 | 8 | 14 |
| Gymnastics | 5 | 8 | 13 |
| Hockey | 18 | 18 | 36 |
| Lawn bowls | 11 | 6 | 17 |
| Netball | —N/a | 12 | 12 |
| Rugby sevens | 13 | 13 | 26 |
| Shooting | 16 | 12 | 28 |
| Squash | 5 | 5 | 10 |
| Swimming | 36 | 33 | 69 |
| Table tennis | 6 | 6 | 12 |
| Triathlon | 6 | 6 | 12 |
| Weightlifting/Powerlifting | 10 | 9 | 19 |
| Wrestling | 5 | 2 | 7 |
| Total | 234 | 235 | 469 |

== Medallists ==
| Medal | Name | Sport | Event | Date |
|---|---|---|---|---|
| Gold | Kelland O'Brien; Leigh Howard; Jordan Kerby*; Alexander Porter; Sam Welsford | Cycling | Men's team pursuit | 5 April |
| Gold | Ashlee Ankudinoff; Amy Cure; Annette Edmondson; Alexandra Manly | Cycling | Women's team pursuit | 5 April |
| Gold | Kaarle McCulloch; Stephanie Morton | Cycling | Women's team sprint | 5 April |
| Gold | Sam Welsford | Cycling | Men's scratch race | 7 April |
| Gold | Amy Cure | Cycling | Women's scratch race | 8 April |
| Gold | Mack Horton | Swimming | Men's 400 m freestyle | 5 April |
| Gold | Bronte Campbell; Cate Campbell; Shayna Jack; Emma McKeon | Swimming | Women's 4 × 100 m freestyle relay | 5 April |
| Gold | Emma McKeon; Brianna Throssell; Leah Neale; Ariarne Titmus | Swimming | Women's 4 × 200 m freestyle relay | 7 April |
| Gold | Emily Seebohm; Georgia Bohl; Emma McKeon; Bronte Campbell | Swimming | Women's 4 × 100 metre medley relay | 10 April |
| Gold | Matthew Glaetzer | Cycling | Men's keirin | 6 April |
| Gold | Matthew Glaetzer | Cycling | Men's 1 km time trial | 8 April |
| Gold | Kaarle McCulloch | Cycling | Women's 500 m time trial | 7 April |
| Gold | Stephanie Morton | Cycling | Women's sprint | 6 April |
| Gold | Stephanie Morton | Cycling | Women's keirin | 8 April |
| Gold | Cameron Meyer | Cycling | Men's road time trial | 10 April |
| Gold | Katrin Garfoot | Cycling | Women's road time trial | 10 April |
| Gold | Steele Von Hoff | Cycling | Men's road race | 14 April |
| Gold | Chloe Hosking | Cycling | Women's road race | 14 April |
| Gold | Timothy Disken | Swimming | Men's 100 m freestyle S9 | 6 April |
| Gold | Lakeisha Patterson | Swimming | Women's 100 metre freestyle S9 | 8 April |
| Gold | Lakeisha Patterson | Swimming | Women's 50 metre freestyle S8 | 10 April |
| Gold | Timothy Disken | Swimming | Men's 100 metre breaststroke SB8 | 7 April |
| Gold | Jesse Aungles | Swimming | Men's 200 metre individual medley SM8 | 8 April |
| Gold | Kyle Chalmers | Swimming | Men's 200 m freestyle | 6 April |
| Gold | Mitch Larkin | Swimming | Men's 100 m backstroke | 6 April |
| Gold | Mitch Larkin | Swimming | Men's 50 m backstroke | 8 April |
| Gold | Mitch Larkin | Swimming | Men's 200 m backstroke | 9 April |
| Gold | Mitch Larkin | Swimming | Men's 200 metre individual medley | 10 April |
| Gold | Brenden Hall | Swimming | Men's 100 m backstroke S9 | 10 April |
| Gold | Ariarne Titmus | Swimming | Women's 800 m freestyle | 9 April |
| Gold | Ariarne Titmus | Swimming | Women's 400 m freestyle | 10 April |
| Gold | Emily Seebohm | Swimming | Women's 50 metre backstroke | 10 April |
| Gold | Matt Levy | Swimming | Men's 50 m freestyle S7 | 9 April |
| Gold | Clyde Lewis | Swimming | Men's 400 m individual medley | 6 April |
| Gold | Jack Cartwright; Kyle Chalmers; James Magnussen; Cameron McEvoy; James Roberts* | Swimming | Men's 4 × 100 m freestyle relay | 6 April |
| Gold | Mitch Larkin; Jake Packard; Grant Irvine; Kyle Chalmers; Bradley Woodward*; Matthew Wilson*; David Morgan*; Jack Cartwright* | Swimming | Men's 4 × 100 m medley relay | 10 April |
| Gold | Alexander Graham; Kyle Chalmers; Elijah Winnington; Mack Horton | Swimming | Men's 4 × 200 m freestyle relay | 8 April |
| Gold | Emma McKeon | Swimming | Women's 100 m butterfly | 6 April |
| Gold | Cate Campbell | Swimming | Women's 50 metre freestyle | 7 April |
| Gold | Bronte Campbell | Swimming | Women's 100 metre freestyle | 9 April |
| Gold | Cate Campbell | Swimming | Women's 50 metre butterfly | 8 April |
| Gold | Jack McLoughlin | Swimming | Men's 1500 metre freestyle | 10 April |
| Gold | Gillian Backhouse; Matt Hauser; Ashleigh Gentle; Jake Birtwhistle | Triathlon | Mixed relay | 7 April |
| Gold | Christopher Remkes | Gymnastics | Men's vault | 9 April |
| Gold | Alexandra Eade | Gymnastics | Women's floor | 9 April |
| Gold | Carla Krizanic; Natasha Scott; Rebecca Van Asch | Lawn bowls | Women's triples | 12 April |
| Gold | Kelsey Cottrell; Carla Krizanic; Natasha Scott; Rebecca Van Asch | Lawn bowls | Women's fours | 9 April |
| Gold | Jake Fehlberg; Lynne Seymour | Lawn bowls | Mixed para-sport pairs | 11 April |
| Gold | Tony Bonnell; Ken Hanson; Josh Thornton | Lawn bowls | Open para-sport triples | 12 April |
| Gold | Aaron Wilson | Lawn bowls | Men's singles | 13 April |
| Gold | Tia-Clair Toomey | Weightlifting | Women's 58 kg | 6 April |
| Gold | Dane Bird-Smith | Athletics | Men's 20 kilometres walk | 8 April |
| Gold | Michael Shelley | Athletics | Men's marathon | 15 April |
| Gold | Australia women's national basketball team: Stephanie Blicavs; Katie-Rae Ebzery; Liz Cambage; Cayla George; Kelsey Griffin; Alice Kunek; Tessa Lavey; Ezi Magbegor; Jenna O'Hea; Nicole Seekamp; Belinda Snell; Stephanie Talbot | Basketball | Women's tournament | 14 April |
| Gold | Australia men's national basketball team: Angus Brandt; Jason Cadee; Cameron Gliddon; Chris Goulding; Nick Kay; Daniel Kickert; Damian Martin; Brad Newley; Mitch Norton; Nathan Sobey; Lucas Walker; Jesse Wagstaff | Basketball | Men's tournament | 15 April |
| Gold | Australia men's national field hockey team: Daniel Beale; Andrew Charter; Tom Craig; Matt Dawson; Jeremy Edwards; Jake Harvie; Jeremy Hayward; Aaron Kleinschmidt; Mark Knowles(c); Tyler Lovell; Trent Mitton; Eddie Ockenden; Flynn Ogilvie; Lachlan Sharp; Jacob Whetton; Tom Wickham; Dylan Wotherspoon; Aran Zalewski | Hockey | Men's tournament | 14 April |
| Gold | Madison de Rozario | Athletics | Women's 1500 metres (T54) | 10 April |
| Gold | Madison de Rozario | Athletics | Women's marathon (T54) | 15 April |
| Gold | Kurt Fearnley | Athletics | Men's marathon (T54) | 15 April |
| Gold | Jemima Montag | Athletics | Women's 20 kilometres walk | 8 April |
| Gold | Evan O'Hanlon | Athletics | Men's 100m T38 | 9 April |
| Gold | Kathryn Mitchell | Athletics | Women's javelin | 11 April |
| Gold | Kurtis Marschall | Athletics | Men's pole vault | 12 April |
| Gold | Dani Stevens | Athletics | Women's discus throw | 12 April |
| Gold | Brandon Starc | Athletics | Men's high jump | 11 April |
| Gold | Isis Holt | Athletics | Women's 100 metres (T35) | 11 April |
| Gold | Cameron Crombie | Athletics | Men's shot put (F38) | 11 April |
| Gold | Chris McHugh; Damien Schumann | Beach volleyball | Men's | 12 April |
| Gold | Dane Sampson | Shooting | Men's 10 metre air rifle | 8 April |
| Gold | Daniel Repacholi | Shooting | Men's 50 metre pistol | 11 April |
| Gold | Laetisha Scanlan | Shooting | Women's trap | 13 April |
| Gold | Esther Qin; Georgia Sheehan | Diving | Women's synchronised 3 metre springboard | 11 April |
| Gold | Melissa Wu | Diving | Women's 10 metre platform | 12 April |
| Gold | Domonic Bedggood | Diving | Men's 10 metre platform | 14 April |
| Gold | Anja Stridsman | Boxing | Women's lightweight | 14 April |
| Gold | Skye Nicolson | Boxing | Women's featherweight | 14 April |
| Gold | Harry Garside | Boxing | Men's lightweight | 14 April |
| Gold | Melissa Tapper | Table tennis | Women's TT6–10 singles | 14 April |
| Gold | Donna Urquhart; Cameron Pilley | Squash | Mixed doubles | 14 April |
| Gold | Zac Alexander; David Palmer | Squash | Men's doubles | 15 April |
| Silver | Georgia Sheehan | Diving | Women's 1 metre springboard | 13 April |
| Silver | Liam Schluter | Swimming | Men's 200 m freestyle S14 | 5 April |
| Silver | Jack McLoughlin | Swimming | Men's 400 m freestyle | 5 April |
| Silver | Ariarne Titmus | Swimming | Women's 200 m freestyle | 5 April |
| Silver | David Morgan | Swimming | Men's 200 metre butterfly | 7 April |
| Silver | Holly Barratt | Swimming | Women's 50 metre butterfly | 8 April |
| Silver | Timothy Hodge | Swimming | Men's 100 m backstroke S9 | 10 April |
| Silver | Timothy Hodge | Swimming | Men's 100 metre breaststroke SB8 | 7 April |
| Silver | Bronte Campbell | Swimming | Women's 50 metre freestyle | 7 April |
| Silver | Cate Campbell | Swimming | Women's 100 metre freestyle | 9 April |
| Silver | Emily Seebohm | Swimming | Women's 100 metre backstroke | 7 April |
| Silver | Jessica Ashwood | Swimming | Women's 800 m freestyle | 9 April |
| Silver | Laura Taylor | Swimming | Women's 200 metre butterfly | 9 April |
| Silver | Ben Treffers | Swimming | Men's 50 m backstroke | 8 April |
| Silver | Jacob Birtwhistle | Triathlon | Men's event | 5 April |
| Silver | Angie Ballard | Athletics | Women's 1500 metres (T54) | 10 April |
| Silver | Kurt Fearnley | Athletics | Men's 1500 metres (T54) | 10 April |
| Silver | Eliza Ault-Connell | Athletics | Women's marathon (T54) | 15 April |
| Silver | Alexandra Hulley | Athletics | Women's hammer throw | 10 April |
| Silver | Kelsey-Lee Roberts | Athletics | Women's javelin | 11 April |
| Silver | Marty Jackson | Athletics | Men's shot put (F38) | 11 April |
| Silver | Henry Frayne | Athletics | Men's long jump | 11 April |
| Silver | Lisa Weightman | Athletics | Women's marathon | 15 April |
| Silver | Hamish Peacock | Athletics | Men's javelin throw | 14 April |
| Silver | Rhiannon Clarke | Athletics | Women's 100 metres (T38) | 12 April |
| Silver | Australia women's national field hockey team: Jocelyn Bartram; Edwina Bone; Jane Claxton; Ashlea Fey; Savannah Fitzpatrick; Jordyn Holzberger; Emily Hurtz; Jodie Kenny; Stephanie Kershaw; Rachael Lynch; Karri McMahon; Gabrielle Nance; Kaitlin Nobbs; Brooke Peris; Madi Ratcliffe; Grace Stewart; Emily Smith; Renee Taylor | Hockey | Women's tournament | 14 April |
| Silver | Australia women's national rugby sevens team: Charlotte Caslick; Emilee Cherry; Dominique Du Toit; Georgina Friedrichs; Ellia Green; Demi Hayes; Shannon Parry; Evania Pelite; Alicia Quirk; Cassandra Staples; Emma Sykes; Emma Tonegato; Sharni Williams | Rugby sevens | Women's tournament | 15 April |
| Silver | Australia national netball team: Caitlin Bassett; April Brandley; Courtney Bruce; Laura Geitz; Susan Pettitt; Kim Ravaillion; Madi Robinson; Gabi Simpson; Caitlin Thwaites; Liz Watson; Jo Weston; Stephanie Wood | Netball | Women's tournament | 15 April |
| Silver | Jason Whateley | Boxing | Men's heavyweight | 14 April |
| Silver | Caitlin Parker | Boxing | Women's middleweight | 14 April |
| Silver | Mariafe Artacho del Solar; Taliqua Clancy | Beach volleyball | Women's | 12 April |
| Silver | Nic Beveridge | Triathlon | Men's PTWC | 7 April |
| Silver | Emily Tapp | Triathlon | Women's PTWC | 7 April |
| Silver | Rebecca Wiasak | Cycling | Women's individual pursuit | 6 April |
| Silver | Stephanie Morton | Cycling | Women's 500 m time trial | 7 April |
| Silver | Kaarle McCulloch | Cycling | Women's keirin | 8 April |
| Silver | Georgia Godwin | Gymnastics | Women's all-around | 7 April |
| Silver | Georgia-Rose Brown | Gymnastics | Women's balance beam | 9 April |
| Silver | Mack Horton | Swimming | Men's 200 m freestyle | 6 April |
| Silver | Bradley Woodward | Swimming | Men's 100 m backstroke | 6 April |
| Silver | Bradley Woodward | Swimming | Men's 200 m backstroke | 9 April |
| Silver | Paige Leonhardt | Swimming | Women's 100 metre breaststroke SB9 | 9 April |
| Silver | Ellie Cole | Swimming | Women's 100 m backstroke S9 | 6 April |
| Silver | Kyle Chalmers | Swimming | Men's 100 m freestyle | 8 April |
| Silver | Blake Cochrane | Swimming | Men's 200 metre individual medley SM8 | 8 April |
| Silver | Matthew Denny | Athletics | Men's hammer throw | 8 April |
| Silver | Erin Cleaver | Athletics | Women's long jump T38 | 8 April |
| Silver | Brooke Stratton | Athletics | Women's long jump | 12 April |
| Silver | Elena Galiabovitch | Shooting | Women's 25 m pistol | 10 April |
| Silver | Sergei Evglevski | Shooting | Men's 25 metre rapid fire pistol | 13 April |
| Silver | Jim Bailey | Shooting | Queen's Prize individual | 14 April |
| Silver | Emma Cox | Shooting | Women's double trap | 11 April |
| Silver | Aron Sherriff; Barrie Lester; Nathan Rice | Lawn bowls | Men's triples | 8 April |
| Silver | Aron Sherriff; Barrie Lester; Nathan Rice; Brett Wilkie | Lawn bowls | Men's fours | 13 April |
| Silver | Madeline Groves | Swimming | Women's 100 m butterfly | 6 April |
| Silver | Kerry Bell | Shooting | Men's 10 metre air pistol | 9 April |
| Silver | James Connor | Diving | Men's 1 metre springboard | 11 April |
| Silver | Maddison Keeney | Diving | Women's 3 metre springboard | 14 April |
| Silver | Kaity Fassina | Weightlifting | Women's 90 kg | 9 April |
| Bronze | Taylor Doyle | Athletics | Women's long jump T38 | 8 April |
| Bronze | Cedric Dubler | Athletics | Men's decathlon | 10 April |
| Bronze | Nina Kennedy | Athletics | Women's pole vault | 13 April |
| Bronze | Jake Lappin | Athletics | Men's 1500 metres (T54) | 10 April |
| Bronze | Nicholas Hough | Athletics | Men's 110 metres hurdles | 10 April |
| Bronze | Lara Nielsen | Athletics | Women's hammer throw | 10 April |
| Bronze | Luke Mathews | Athletics | Men's 800 metres | 12 April |
| Bronze | Thomas Clarke; Bradley Henderson | Cycling | Men's tandem 1 km time trial B | 5 April |
| Bronze | Thomas Clarke; Bradley Henderson | Cycling | Men's tandem sprint B | 7 April |
| Bronze | Patrick Constable; Matthew Glaetzer*; Nathan Hart; Jacob Schmid | Cycling | Men's team sprint | 5 April |
| Bronze | Daniel Fox | Swimming | Men's 200 m freestyle S14 | 5 April |
| Bronze | Matthew Wilson | Swimming | Men's 200 m breaststroke | 5 April |
| Bronze | Emma McKeon | Swimming | Women's 200 m freestyle | 5 April |
| Bronze | Mack Horton | Swimming | Men's 1500 metre freestyle | 10 April |
| Bronze | Blair Evans | Swimming | Women's 400 m individual medley | 5 April |
| Bronze | Annette Edmondson | Cycling | Women's individual pursuit | 6 April |
| Bronze | Taylah Robertson | Boxing | Women's flyweight | 11 April |
| Bronze | Kaye Scott | Boxing | Women's welterweight | 11 April |
| Bronze | Clay Waterman | Boxing | Men's light heavyweight | 13 April |
| Bronze | Kaarle McCulloch | Cycling | Women's sprint | 6 April |
| Bronze | Jacob Schmid | Cycling | Men's sprint | 7 April |
| Bronze | Georgia-Rose Brown; Georgia Godwin; Rianna Mizzen; Emily Whitehead | Gymnastics | Women's artistic team all-around | 6 April |
| Bronze | Emily Whitehead | Gymnastics | Women's vault | 8 April |
| Bronze | Enid Sung; Danielle Prince; Alexandra Kiroi-Bogatyreva | Gymnastics | Women's rhythmic team all-around | 11 April |
| Bronze | Alexandra Kiroi-Bogatyreva | Gymnastics | Individual ball | 13 April |
| Bronze | Georgia Godwin | Gymnastics | Women's uneven bars | 8 April |
| Bronze | Brenden Hall | Swimming | Men's 100 m freestyle S9 | 6 April |
| Bronze | Leiston Pickett | Swimming | Women's 50 m breaststroke | 6 April |
| Bronze | Georgia Bohl | Swimming | Women's 100 metre breaststroke | 9 April |
| Bronze | Ashleigh McConnell | Swimming | Women's 100 m backstroke S9 | 6 April |
| Bronze | Katherine Downie | Swimming | Women's 200 metre individual medley SM10 | 7 April |
| Bronze | Brianna Throssell | Swimming | Women's 100 m butterfly | 6 April |
| Bronze | Logan Powell | Swimming | Men's 100 m backstroke S9 | 10 April |
| Bronze | Blake Cochrane | Swimming | Men's 100 metre breaststroke SB8 | 7 April |
| Bronze | Emily Seebohm | Swimming | Women's 100 metre backstroke | 8 April |
| Bronze | Clyde Lewis | Swimming | Men's 200 metre individual medley | 10 April |
| Bronze | Madeline Groves | Swimming | Women's 50 metre butterfly | 8 April |
| Bronze | Zac Incerti | Swimming | Men's 50 m backstroke | 8 April |
| Bronze | Cameron McEvoy | Swimming | Men's 50 metre freestyle | 10 April |
| Bronze | Ellie Cole | Swimming | Women's 100 metre freestyle S9 | 8 April |
| Bronze | Josh Beaver | Swimming | Men's 200 m backstroke | 9 April |
| Bronze | Grant Irvine | Swimming | Men's 100 metre butterfly | 9 April |
| Bronze | Kiah Melverton | Swimming | Women's 800 m freestyle | 9 April |
| Bronze | Madeleine Scott | Swimming | Women's 100 metre breaststroke SB9 | 9 April |
| Bronze | Emma McKeon | Swimming | Women's 200 metre butterfly | 9 April |
| Bronze | Elena Galiabovitch | Shooting | Women's 10 metre air pistol | 8 April |
| Bronze | Bill Chaffey | Triathlon | Men's PTWC | 7 April |
| Bronze | Lauren Parker | Triathlon | Women's PTWC | 7 April |
| Bronze | François Etoundi | Weightlifting | Men's 77 kg | 7 April |
| Bronze | Brianna Coop | Athletics | Women's 100 metres (T35) | 11 April |
| Bronze | Jessica Trengove | Athletics | Women's marathon | 15 April |
| Bronze | Nicola McDermott | Athletics | Women's high jump | 14 April |
| Bronze | James Connor | Diving | Men's 3 metre springboard | 12 April |
| Bronze | Domonic Bedggood; Declan Stacey | Diving | Men's synchronised 10 metre platform | 13 April |
| Bronze | Anabelle Smith | Diving | Women's 3 metre springboard | 14 April |
| Bronze | Esther Qin | Diving | Women's 1 metre springboard | 13 April |
| Bronze | Domonic Bedggood; Matthew Carter | Diving | Men's synchronised 3 metre springboard | 13 April |
| Bronze | Donna Urquhart; Rachael Grinham | Squash | Women's doubles | 15 April |
| Bronze | Andrea McDonnell | Table tennis | Women's TT6–10 singles | 14 April |

* – Athlete competed in preliminary round(s) but not final round

Medals by sport
| Sport | 1st place, gold medalist(s) | 2nd place, silver medalist(s) | 3rd place, bronze medalist(s) | Total |
| Swimming | 28 | 21 | 24 | 73 |
| Cycling | 14 | 3 | 6 | 23 |
| Athletics | 13 | 13 | 10 | 36 |
| Lawn bowls | 5 | 2 | 0 | 7 |
| Shooting | 3 | 5 | 1 | 9 |
| Diving | 3 | 3 | 5 | 11 |
| Boxing | 3 | 2 | 3 | 8 |
| Gymnastics | 2 | 2 | 5 | 9 |
| Squash | 2 | 0 | 1 | 3 |
| Basketball | 2 | 0 | 0 | 2 |
| Triathlon | 1 | 3 | 2 | 6 |
| Weightlifting | 1 | 1 | 1 | 3 |
| Beach volleyball | 1 | 1 | 0 | 2 |
| Field hockey | 1 | 1 | 0 | 2 |
| Table tennis | 1 | 0 | 1 | 2 |
| Netball | 0 | 1 | 0 | 1 |
| Rugby sevens | 0 | 1 | 0 | 1 |
| Total | 80 | 59 | 59 | 198 |

Para Medals by sport
| Sport | 1st place, gold medalist(s) | 2nd place, silver medalist(s) | 3rd place, bronze medalist(s) | Total |
| Swimming | 7 | 6 | 8 | 21 |
| Athletics | 6 | 6 | 3 | 15 |
| Lawn bowls | 2 | 0 | 0 | 2 |
| Table tennis | 1 | 0 | 1 | 2 |
| Triathlon | 0 | 2 | 2 | 4 |
| Cycling | 0 | 0 | 2 | 2 |
| Total | 16 | 14 | 16 | 46 |

Medals by date
| Day | Date | 1st place, gold medalist(s) | 2nd place, silver medalist(s) | 3rd place, bronze medalist(s) | Total |
| 1 | 5 April | 5 | 4 | 6 | 15 |
| 2 | 6 April | 9 | 5 | 7 | 21 |
| 3 | 7 April | 6 | 8 | 7 | 21 |
| 4 | 8 April | 11 | 8 | 8 | 27 |
| 5 | 9 April | 8 | 8 | 6 | 22 |
| 6 | 10 April | 11 | 5 | 8 | 24 |
| 7 | 11 April | 7 | 5 | 3 | 13 |
| 8 | 12 April | 6 | 3 | 2 | 11 |
| 9 | 13 April | 2 | 3 | 7 | 12 |
| 10 | 14 April | 10 | 6 | 3 | 19 |
| 11 | 15 April | 5 | 4 | 2 | 11 |
| Total | | 80 | 59 | 59 | 198 |

Medals by gender
| Gender | 1st place, gold medalist(s) | 2nd place, silver medalist(s) | 3rd place, bronze medalist(s) | Total |
| Male | 40 | 24 | 25 | 89 |
| Female | 37 | 34 | 34 | 105 |
| Mixed | 3 | 1 | 0 | 4 |
| Total | 80 | 59 | 59 | 198 |

== Athletics (track and field) ==
Athletics Australia announced an initial team of 51 athletes. On 1 March 2018, Athletics Australia announced the final team of 109 athletes, the second-largest team in history following Melbourne in 2006. On 6 March 2018, Ella Nelson withdrew from the team due to injury and was replaced by Larissa Pasternatsky. Marathon runner Chris Hammer withdrew on 1 April due to injury. On 5 April, Sally Pearson announced an Achilles tendon injury had forced her withdrawal from defending her 100 m hurdles gold medal and from the 4 × 100 m relay. Declan Carruthers was selected but did not compete in men's pole vault due to hamstring injury.

Men
Track & road events

| Athlete | Event | Heat | | Semifinal | | Final | |
| Athlete | Event | Result | Rank | Result | Rank | Result | Rank |
|---|---|---|---|---|---|---|---|
| Rohan Browning | 100 m | 10.29 | 3 q | 10.26 | 3 | Did not advance | |
| Josh Clarke | 100 m | 10.56 | 3 | Did not advance | | | |
| Trae Williams | 100 m | 10.28 | 1 Q | 10.28 | 4 | Did not advance | |
| Evan O'Hanlon | 100 m T38 | —N/a | | | | 11.09 | 1st place, gold medalist(s) |
| Samuel Walker | 100 m T38 | —N/a | | | | 11.80 | 6 |
| Alex Hartmann | 200 m | 20.66 | 2 Q | 20.76 | 4 | Did not advance | |
| Steven Solomon | 400 m | 45.39 | 1 Q | 45.55 | 3 q | 45.64 | 7 |
| Joseph Deng | 800 m | 1:45.72 | 3 q | —N/a | | 1:47.20 | 7 |
| Luke Mathews | 800 m | 1:46.53 | 2 Q | —N/a | | 1:45.60 | 3rd place, bronze medalist(s) |
| Josh Ralph | 800 m | 1:47.76 | 3 | —N/a | | Did not advance | |
| Ryan Gregson | 1500 m | 3:43.06 | 2 Q | —N/a | | 3:39.24 | 9 |
| Luke Mathews | 1500 m | 3:47.08 | 7 q | —N/a | | 3:47.04 | 12 |
| Jordan Williamsz | 1500 m | 3:47.75 | 5 q | —N/a | | 3:38.34 | 6 |
| Kurt Fearnley | 1500 m (T54) | 3:06.72 | 2 Q | —N/a | | 3:11.92 | 2nd place, silver medalist(s) |
| Jake Lappin | 1500 m (T54) | 3:11.42 | 1 Q | —N/a | | 3:12.60 | 3rd place, bronze medalist(s) |
| Samuel Rizzo | 1500 m (T54) | 3:12.91 | 4 Q | —N/a | | 3:14.16 | 6 |
| Morgan McDonald | 5000 m | —N/a | | | | 14:11.37 | 8 |
| David McNeill | 5000 m | —N/a | | | | 14:24.51 | 12 |
| Stewart McSweyn | 5000 m | —N/a | | | | 13:58.96 | 5 |
| Stewart McSweyn | 10000 m | —N/a | | | | 28:58.22 | 11 |
| Patrick Tiernan | 10000 m | —N/a | | | | DSQ | |
| Nicholas Hough | 110 m hurdles | 13.46 | 3 Q | —N/a | | 13.38 | 3rd place, bronze medalist(s) |
| Ian Dewhurst | 400 m hurdles | 49.84 | 3 | —N/a | | Did not advance | |
| James Nipperess | 3000 m steeplechase | —N/a | | | | 8:58.16 | 9 |
| Rohan Browning; Josh Clarke; Jack Hale; Trae Williams | 4 × 100 m relay | 38.78 | 2 Q | —N/a | | 38.58 | 4 |
| Murray Goodwin; Daniel Mowen; Joshua Ralph; Steven Solomon | 4 × 400 m relay | DSQ | | —N/a | | Did not advance | |
| Liam Adams | Marathon | —N/a | | | | 2:21:08 | 5 |
| Michael Shelley | Marathon | —N/a | | | | 2:16:46 | 1st place, gold medalist(s) |
| Kurt Fearnley | Marathon T54 | —N/a | | | | 1:30:26 GR | 1st place, gold medalist(s) |
| Jake Lappin | Marathon T54 | —N/a | | | | 1:37:34 | 6 |
| Dane Bird-Smith | 20km walk | —N/a | | | | 1:19:34 GR | 1st place, gold medalist(s) |
| Michael Hosking | 20km walk | —N/a | | | | 1:25:35 | 10 |
| Rhydian Cowley | 20km walk | —N/a | | | | 1:26:12 | 11 |

Field events

| Athlete | Event | Qualification | | Final | |
| Athlete | Event | Distance | Rank | Distance | Rank |
|---|---|---|---|---|---|
| Henry Frayne | Long jump | 8.34 GR | 1 Q | 8.33 | 2nd place, silver medalist(s) |
| Fabrice Lapierre | Long jump | 7.76 | 12 q | 7.56 | 12 |
| Chris Mitrevski | Long jump | 7.82 | 11q | 7.90 | 6 |
| Emmanuel Fakiye | Triple jump | 15.70 | 8 | Did not advance | |
| Joel Baden | High jump | 2.15 | 8 | Did not advance | |
| Brandon Starc | High jump | 2.21 | 2 q | 2.32 | 1st place, gold medalist(s) |
| Angus Armstrong | Pole vault | —N/a | | 5.35 | 5 |
| Kurtis Marschall | Pole vault | —N/a | | 5.70 | 1st place, gold medalist(s) |
| Damien Birkinhead | Shot put | 20.47 | 3 Q | 20.77 | 5 |
| Mitchell Cooper | Discus | 59.68 | 5 q | 60.40 | 5 |
| Matthew Denny | Discus | 64.67 | 2 Q | 62.53 | 4 |
| Benn Harradine | Discus | 61.64 | 2 q | 59.92 | 5 |
| Cameron Crombie | Shot Put F38 | —N/a | | 15.74 | 1st place, gold medalist(s) |
| Marty Jackson | Shot Put F38 | —N/a | | 13.74 | 2nd place, silver medalist(s) |
| Jayden Sawyer | Shot Put F38 | —N/a | | 12.40 | 4 |
| Luke Cain | Javelin throw | 77.43 | 4 q | 76.99 | 6 |
| Hamish Peacock | Javelin throw | 81.22 | 1 Q | 82.59 | 2nd place, silver medalist(s) |
| Jack Dalton | Hammer throw | —N/a | | 68.28 | 8 |
| Matthew Denny | Hammer throw | —N/a | | 74.88 | 2nd place, silver medalist(s) |
| Huw Peacock | Hammer throw | —N/a | | 65.19 | 11 |

Combined events – Decathlon

| Athlete | Event | 100 m | LJ | SP | HJ | 400 m | 110H | DT | PV | JT | 1500 m | Final | Rank |
|---|---|---|---|---|---|---|---|---|---|---|---|---|---|
| Kyle Cranston | Result | 11.16 | 7.18 | 13.59 | 1.92 | 49.94 | 15.12 | 43.19 | 4.40 | 62.36 | 4:31.91 | 7734 | 5 |
| Kyle Cranston | Points | 825 | 857 | 703 | 731 | 817 | 835 | 730 | 731 | 773 | 732 | 7734 | 5 |
| Cedric Dubler | Result | 10.69 | 7.59 | 12.34 | 2.01 | 48.39 | 14.24 | 40.59 | 5.00 | 54.63 | 4:57.03 | 7983 | 3rd place, bronze medalist(s) |
| Cedric Dubler | Points | 931 | 957 | 627 | 813 | 890 | 944 | 677 | 910 | 657 | 571 | 7983 | 3rd place, bronze medalist(s) |

Women
Track & road events

| Athlete | Event | Heat | | Semifinal | | Final | |
| Athlete | Event | Result | Rank | Result | Rank | Result | Rank |
|---|---|---|---|---|---|---|---|
| Melissa Breen | 100 m | 11.65 | 4 q | 11.76 | 5 | Did not advance | |
| Brianna Coop | 100 m T35 | —N/a | | | | 15.63 | 3rd place, bronze medalist(s) |
| Isis Holt | 100 m T35 | —N/a | | | | 13.58 | 1st place, gold medalist(s) |
| Carly Salmon | 100 m T35 | —N/a | | | | 16.39 | 4 |
| Rhiannon Clarke | 100 m T38 | —N/a | | | | 13.17 | 2nd place, silver medalist(s) |
| Erin Cleaver | 100 m T38 | —N/a | | | | 14.43 | 5 |
| Ella Pardy | 100 m T38 | —N/a | | | | 13.48 | 4 |
| Madison Coates | 200 m | 23.51 | 2 Q | 23.43 | 4 | Did not advance | |
| Riley Day | 200 m | 23.71 | 3 Q | 23.24 | 3 | Did not advance | |
| Larissa Pasternatsky | 200 m | 23.55 | 5 q | 23.64 | 5 | Did not advance | |
| Morgan Mitchell | 400 m | 52.81 | 5 q | 52.65 | 3 | Did not advance | |
| Bendere Oboya | 400 m | 55.62 | 6 | Did not advance | | | |
| Anneliese Rubie | 400 m | 52.32 | 1 Q | 51.51 | 3 q | 52.03 | 7 |
| Georgia Griffth | 800 m | 2:00.73 | 3 | —N/a | | Did not advance | |
| Brittany McGowan | 800 m | 2:01.17 | 4 | —N/a | | Did not advance | |
| Keely Small | 800 m | 2:00.81 | 6 | —N/a | | Did not advance | |
| Zoe Buckman | 1500 m | 4:11.78 | 8 q | —N/a | | 4:06.76 | 12 |
| Georgia Griffth | 1500 m | 4:06.41 | 2 Q | —N/a | | 4:04.17 | 5 |
| Linden Hall | 1500 m | 4:08.64 | 3 Q | —N/a | | 4:03.67 | 4 |
| Eliza Ault-Connel | 1500 m (T54) | —N/a | | | | 3:38.88 | 4 |
| Angie Ballard | 1500 m (T54) | —N/a | | | | 3:36.85 | 2nd place, silver medalist(s) |
| Madison de Rozario | 1500 m (T54) | —N/a | | | | 3:34.06 | 1st place, gold medalist(s) |
| Madeline Hills | 5000 m | —N/a | | | | 15:46.92 | 10 |
| Celia Sullohern | 5000 m | —N/a | | | | 15:34.73 | 5 |
| Eloise Wellings | 5000 m | —N/a | | | | 15:39.02 | 8 |
| Madeline Hills | 10000 m | —N/a | | | | 32:01.04 | 8 |
| Celia Sullohern | 10000 m | —N/a | | | | 31:50.75 | 6 |
| Eloise Wellings | 10000 m | —N/a | | | | 32:51.47 | 16 |
| Brianna Beahan | 100 m hurdles | 13.02 | 2 Q | —N/a | | 13.11 | 5 |
| Michelle Jenneke | 100 m hurdles | 12.99 | 4 q | —N/a | | 13.07 | 4 |
| Lauren Wells | 400 m hurdles | 55.73 | 5 | —N/a | | Did not advance | |
| Genevieve LaCaze | 3000 m steeplechase | —N/a | | | | 9:42.69 | 5 |
| Victoria Mitchell | 3000 m steeplechase | —N/a | | | | 10:12.59 | 9 |
| Brianna Beahan; Melissa Breen; Maddie Coates; Riley Day | 4 × 100 m relay | —N/a | | | | DSQ | |
| Caitlin Jones; Morgan Mitchell; Anneliese Rubie; Lauren Wells | 4 × 400 m relay | —N/a | | | | 3:27.43 | 5 |
| Virginia Moloney | Marathon | —N/a | | | | 2:58:54 | 16 |
| Jessica Trengove | Marathon | —N/a | | | | 2:34:09 | 3rd place, bronze medalist(s) |
| Lisa Weightman | Marathon | —N/a | | | | 2:33:23 | 2nd place, silver medalist(s) |
| Eliza Ault-Connell | Marathon T54 | —N/a | | | | 1:44:13 | 2nd place, silver medalist(s) |
| Madison de Rozario | Marathon T54 | —N/a | | | | 1:44:00 | 1st place, gold medalist(s) |
| Jemima Montag | 20km walk | —N/a | | | | 1:32:50 | 1st place, gold medalist(s) |
| Beki Smith | 20km walk | —N/a | | | | 1:40:41 | 6 |
| Clare Tallent | 20km walk | —N/a | | | | DSQ | |

Field events

| Athlete | Event | Qualification | | Final | |
| Athlete | Event | Distance | Position | Distance | Position |
|---|---|---|---|---|---|
| Naa Anang | Long jump | 6.46 | 5 q | 6.22 | 9 |
| Brooke Stratton | Long jump | 6.73 | 1 Q | 6.77 | 2nd place, silver medalist(s) |
| Lauren Wells | Long jump | 6.46 | 2 q | 6.16 | 11 |
| Erin Cleaver | Long jump T38 | —N/a | | 4.36 | 2nd place, silver medalist(s) |
| Taylor Doyle | Long jump T38 | —N/a | | 4.22 | 3rd place, bronze medalist(s) |
| Kailyn Joseph | Long jump T38 | —N/a | | 4.06 | 5 |
| Nicola McDermott | High jump | —N/a | | 1.91 | 3rd place, bronze medalist(s) |
| Cassie Purdon | High jump | —N/a | | 1.84 | 6 |
| Lisa Campbell | Pole vault | —N/a | | 4.00 | 11 |
| Nina Kennedy | Pole vault | —N/a | | 4.60 | 3rd place, bronze medalist(s) |
| Liz Parnov | Pole vault | —N/a | | 4.40 | 5 |
| Taryn Gollshewsky | Discus throw | —N/a | | 55.47 | 5 |
| Kim Mulhall | Discus throw | —N/a | | 54.93 | 6 |
| Dani Stevens | Discus throw | —N/a | | 68.26 GR | 1st place, gold medalist(s) |
| Kelsey-Lee Roberts | Javelin throw | —N/a | | 63.89 | 2nd place, silver medalist(s) |
| Kathryn Mitchell | Javelin throw | —N/a | | 68.92 GR | 1st place, gold medalist(s) |
| Alexandra Hulley | Hammer throw | —N/a | | 68.20 | 2nd place, silver medalist(s) |
| Danielle McConnell | Hammer throw | —N/a | | 59.60 | 8 |
| Lara Nielsen | Hammer throw | —N/a | | 65.03 | 3rd place, bronze medalist(s) |

Combined events – Heptathlon

| Athlete | Event | 100H | HJ | SP | 200 m | LJ | JT | 800 m | Final | Rank |
|---|---|---|---|---|---|---|---|---|---|---|
| Alysha Burnett | Result | 14.32 | 1.87 | 13.62 | 26.76 | 5.82 | 46.56 | 2:43.14 | 5628 | 9 |
| Alysha Burnett | Points | 934 | 1067 | 769 | 732 | 795 | 794 | 537 | 5628 | 9 |
| Celeste Mucci | Result | 13.19 | 1.75 | 12.22 | 24.59 | 6.10 | 43.03 | 2:29.73 | 5915 | 4 |
| Celeste Mucci | Points | 1096 | 916 | 676 | 925 | 880 | 726 | 696 | 5915 | 4 |

== Badminton ==
Team of ten athletes was announced on 23 February 2018.

Singles & doubles

| Athlete | Event | Round of 64 | Round of 32 | Round of 16 | Quarterfinal | Semifinal | Final / BM | |
| Athlete | Event | Opposition Score | Opposition Score | Opposition Score | Opposition Score | Opposition Score | Opposition Score | Rank |
|---|---|---|---|---|---|---|---|---|
| Anthony Joe | Men's singles | Sam (GHA); W 21–12, 21–13 | Bhatti (PAK); W 22–20, 21–18 | Prannoy (IND); L 18–21, 11–21 | Did not advance | | | |
| Robin Middleton; Ross Smith | Men's doubles | —N/a | Adcock; Lane (ENG); L 10–21, 18–21 | Did not advance | | | | |
| Matthew Chau; Sawan Serasinghe | Men's doubles | —N/a | Ali; Bhatti (PAK); W 21–12, 21–17 | Chrisnanta; Hee (SIN); L 21–23, 21–16, 14–21 | Did not advance | | | |
| Wendy Chen Hsuan-yu | Women's singles | Migbodzi (GHA); W 21–2, 21–3 | Morris (FAI); W 21–3, 21–2 | Pusarla (IND); L 15–21, 9–21 | Did not advance | | | |
| Setyana Mapasa; Gronya Somerville | Women's doubles | —N/a | Bye | Dean; Whiteside (FIJ); W 21–3, 21–6 | Cheah; Lai (MAS); W 21–15, 21–16 | Smith; Walker (ENG); L 15–21, 15–21 | Reddy; Ponnappa (IND); L 19–21, 19–21 | 4 |
| Leanne Choo; Renuga Veeran | Women's doubles | —N/a | Ong; Wong (SIN); L 20–22, 21–16, 18–21 | Did not advance | | | | |
| Setyana Mapasa; Sawan Serasinghe | Mixed doubles | Bye | Ricketts; Wynter (JAM); W 21–17, 21–4 | Lindeman; Tam (CAN); W 21–14, 21–18 | C Adcock; G Adcock (ENG); L 10–21, 14–21 | Did not advance | | |

Mixed team

Summary

| Team | Event | Group stage | | | | Quarterfinal | Semifinal | Final / BM | |
| Team | Event | Opposition Score | Opposition Score | Opposition Score | Rank | Opposition Score | Opposition Score | Opposition Score | Rank |
|---|---|---|---|---|---|---|---|---|---|
| Australia | Mixed team | South Africa; W 5–0 | Uganda; W 4–1 | England; L 5–0 | 2 Q | Singapore; L 0–3 | Did not advance | | |

Roster

- Matthew Chau
- Wendy Chen
- Leanne Choo
- Anthony Joe
- Setyana Mapasa
- Robin Middleton
- Sawan Serasinghe
- Ross Smith
- Gronya Somerville
- Renuga Veeran

Pool C

| Pos | Team | Pld | W | L | MF | MA | MD | GF | GA | GD | PF | PA | PD | Pts | Qualification |
|---|---|---|---|---|---|---|---|---|---|---|---|---|---|---|---|
| 1 | England | 3 | 3 | 0 | 15 | 0 | +15 | 30 | 0 | +30 | 630 | 345 | +285 | 3 | Knockout stage |
| 2 | Australia | 3 | 2 | 1 | 9 | 6 | +3 | 19 | 12 | +7 | 576 | 472 | +104 | 2 | Knockout stage |
| 3 | South Africa | 3 | 1 | 2 | 3 | 12 | −9 | 6 | 24 | −18 | 410 | 592 | −182 | 1 | |
| 4 | Uganda | 3 | 0 | 3 | 3 | 12 | −9 | 6 | 25 | −19 | 406 | 613 | −207 | 0 | |

Updated to match(es) played on 6 April 2018. Source: GC2018

Australia
5
Carrara Sports and Leisure Centre, Gold Coast
5 April

South Africa
0

| | | | 1 | 2 | 3 |
|---|---|---|---|---|---|
| 1 | (Australia) (South Africa) | Anthony Joe; Prakash Vijayanath | 24; 22 | 22; 20 |
| 2 | (Australia) (South Africa) | Wendy Chen Hsuan-yu; Johanita Scholtz | 21; 5 | 21; 13 |
| 3 | (Australia) (South Africa) | Sawan Serasinghe / Matthew Chau; Cameron Coetzer / Bongani von Bodenstein | 21; 8 | 21; 12 |
| 4 | (Australia) (South Africa) | Setyana Mapasa / Gronya Somerville; Michelle Butler-Emmett / Elsie de Villers | 21; 6 | 21; 13 |
| 5 | (Australia) (South Africa) | Sawan Serasinghe / Setyana Mapasa; Prakash Vijayanath / Michelle Butler-Emmett | 21; 8 | 21; 17 |

Australia
4
Carrara Sports and Leisure Centre, Gold Coast
6 April

Uganda
1

| | | | 1 | 2 | 3 |
|---|---|---|---|---|---|
| 1 | (Australia) (Uganda) | Ross Smith / Leanne Choo; Brian Kasirye / Aisha Nakiyemba | 21; 13 | 21; 15 |
| 2 | (Australia) (Uganda) | Anthony Joe; Edwin Ekiring | 21; 23 | 21; 19 | 10; 21 |
| 3 | (Australia) (Uganda) | Wendy Chen Hsuan-yu; Shamim Bangi | 21; 5 | 21; 12 |
| 4 | (Australia) (Uganda) | Robin Middleton / Ross Smith; Edwin Ekiring / Brian Kasirye | 21; 12 | 21; 6 |
| 5 | (Australia) (Uganda) | Leanne Choo / Renuga Veeran; Shamim Bangi / Aisha Nakiyemba | 21; 7 | 21; 5 |

England
5
Carrara Sports and Leisure Centre, Gold Coast
6 April

Australia
0

| | | | 1 | 2 | 3 |
|---|---|---|---|---|---|
| 1 | (England) (Australia) | Chris Adcock / Gabby Adcock; Sawan Serasinghe / Setyana Mapasa | 21; 15 | 21; 15 |
| 2 | (England) (Australia) | Rajiv Ouseph; Anthony Joe | 21; 13 | 21; 11 |
| 3 | (England) (Australia) | Marcus Ellis / Chris Langridge; Sawan Serasinghe / Matthew Chau | 21; 14 | 21; 8 |
| 4 | (England) (Australia) | Chloe Birch; Chen Hsuan-yu | 21; 15 | 21; 15 |
| 5 | (England) (Australia) | Lauren Smith / Sarah Walker; Setyana Mapasa / Gronya Somerville | 21; 17 | 21; 19 |

Quarterfinal

Singapore
3
Carrara Sports and Leisure Centre, Gold Coast
7 April

Australia
0

| | | | 1 | 2 | 3 |
|---|---|---|---|---|---|---|
| 1 | (Singapore) (Australia) | Terry Hee / Tan Wei Han; Matthew Chau / Setyana Mapasa | 21; 17 | 18; 21 | 21; 16 |
| 2 | (Singapore) (Australia) | Loh Kean Yew; Anthony Joe | 21; 8 | 21; 6 |
| 3 | (Singapore) (Australia) | Terry Hee / Danny Bawa Chrisnanta; Robin Middleton / Ross Smith | 21; 15 | 21; 14 |
| 4 | (Singapore) (Australia) | Yeo Jia Min; Wendy Chen | | | | not played |
| 5 | (Singapore) (Australia) | Ren-ne Ong / Crystal Wong; Gronya Somerville / Setyana Mapasa | | | | not played |

== Basketball ==
Australia has qualified a men's and women's basketball teams (as the host nation) for a total of 24 athletes (12 men and 12 women). Team of 12 men and 12 women was announced on 7 March 2018.

Summary

| Team | Event | Preliminary round | | | | Qualifying final | Semifinal | Final / BM | |
| Team | Event | Opposition Score | Opposition Score | Opposition Score | Rank | Opposition Score | Opposition Score | Opposition Score | Rank |
|---|---|---|---|---|---|---|---|---|---|
| Australia men's | Men's tournament | Canada; W 95–55 | New Zealand; W 79–73 | Nigeria; W 97–55 | 1 Q | Bye | Scotland; W 103–46 | Canada; W 87-47 | 1st place, gold medalist(s) |
| Australia women's | Women's tournament | Mozambique; W 113–53 | Canada; W 100–61 | England; W 118–55 | 1 Q | Bye | New Zealand; W 109–50 | England; W 99–55 | 1st place, gold medalist(s) |

=== Men's tournament ===
Roster

- Angus Brandt
- Jason Cadee
- Cameron Gliddon
- Chris Goulding
- Nick Kay
- Daniel Kickert
- Damian Martin
- Brad Newley
- Mitch Norton
- Nathan Sobey
- Lucas Walker
- Jesse Wagstaff

On 2 April 2018, Mitch Creek and Matt Hodgson withdrew from the team and were replaced by Mitch Norton and Lucas Walker.

Pool A

| Team | Pld | W | L | PF | PA | PD | Pts | Qualification |
|---|---|---|---|---|---|---|---|---|
| Australia | 3 | 3 | 0 | 271 | 183 | +88 | 6 | Semifinals |
| New Zealand | 3 | 2 | 1 | 265 | 204 | +61 | 5 | Semifinals |
| Canada | 3 | 1 | 2 | 197 | 244 | −47 | 4 | Qualifying finals |
| Nigeria | 3 | 0 | 3 | 187 | 289 | −102 | 3 | Qualifying finals |

6 April 2018
17:30

Boxscore

| Australia | 95–55 | Canada |
Scoring by quarter: 25–13, 22–16, 22–13, 26–13
| Pts: Kickert 14; Rebs: Brandt, Sobey 11; Asts: Goulding 6 | | Pts: Diawara 10; Rebs: Morgan 6 Asts: Tutu 6 |

Cairns Convention Centre, Cairns
Referees: Bermudez (MEX), Gyoergyi (NOR),
Vincent (IND)

7 April 2018
21:00

Boxscore

| New Zealand | 73–79 | Australia |
Scoring by quarter: 21–19, 19–16, 19-21, 14-23
| Pts: Ili 22; Rebs: Delany 6 Asts: Ili 4 | | Pts: Kay 21; Rebs: Sobey 6 Asts: Cadee 3 |

Cairns Convention Centre, Cairns
Referees: Bermudez (MEX), Liszka (POL),
Dodds (GBR)

9 April 2018
21:00

Boxscore

| Australia | 97–55 | Nigeria |
Scoring by quarter: 23-17, 25-10, 28-14, 21-14
| Pts: Brandt 16; Rebs: Cadee 9 Asts: Sobey 5 | | Pts: Diogu 19; Rebs: Achiuwa 8 Asts: Ofoegbu 3 |

Cairns Convention Centre, Cairns
Referees: Liszka (POL), Kom Njilo (CMR), Dodds (GBR)

Semi-final

14 April 2018
10:00

Boxscore

| Australia | 103–46 | Scotland |
Scoring by quarter: 20–4, 28–18, 35–10, 20–14
| Pts: Wagstaff 17; Rebs: Brandt 6 Asts: Sobey 6 | | Pts: Malcolm, Fraser 9 Rebs: Murray, Nealon-Lino 4 Asts: Bunyan 6 |

Gold Coast Convention and Exhibition Centre, Gold Coast
Referees: Leonardo Zalazar (ARG), Kingsley Ojeaburu (NGR)

Gold medal match

15 April 2018
11:30

Boxscore

| Australia | 87–47 | Canada |
Scoring by quarter: 20–10, 25–9, 18–10, 24–18
| Pts: Goulding 11; Rebs: Sobey 8 Asts: Gliddon 5 | | Pts: Tutu 10; Rebs: Tutu 6 Asts: Morgan, Tutu 3 |

Gold Coast Convention and Exhibition Centre, Gold Coast
Referees: Omar Bermúdez (MEX), Wojciech Liszka (POL), Leonardo Zalazar (ARG)

=== Women's tournament ===
Roster

The following is the Australia roster in the women's basketball tournament of the 2018 Commonwealth Games.

Australia women's national basketball team – 2018 Commonwealth Games roster
Players
Coaches

| Pos. | No. | Name | Age – Date of birth | Height | Club | Ctr. |
|---|---|---|---|---|---|---|
| G/F | 4 | Jenna O'Hea | 30 – 6 June 1987 | 1.86 m (6 ft 1 in) | Melbourne Boomers | (Australia) |
| G | 5 | Tessa Lavey | 25 – 29 March 1993 | 1.71 m (5 ft 7 in) | Dandenong Rangers | (Australia) |
| G | 6 | Stephanie Talbot | 23 – 15 June 1994 | 1.88 m (6 ft 2 in) | Phoenix Mercury | (United States) |
| G | 7 | Stephanie Blicavs | 27 – 26 July 1990 | 1.78 m (5 ft 10 in) | Dandenong Rangers | (Australia) |
| C | 8 | Liz Cambage | 26 – 18 August 1991 | 2.03 m (6 ft 8 in) | Dallas Wings | (United States) |
| F | 9 | Kelsey Griffin | 30 – 2 July 1987 | 1.88 m (6 ft 2 in) | Connecticut Sun | (United States) |
| G | 10 | Katie-Rae Ebzery | 28 – 8 January 1990 | 1.78 m (5 ft 10 in) | Sydney Uni Flames | (Australia) |
| G/F | 12 | Belinda Snell (C) | 37 – 10 January 1981 | 1.80 m (5 ft 11 in) | Sydney Uni Flames | (Australia) |
| F | 13 | Ezi Magbegor | 18 – 13 August 1999 | 1.93 m (6 ft 4 in) | Melbourne Boomers | (Australia) |
| F/C | 15 | Cayla George | 28 – 1 May 1989 | 1.94 m (6 ft 4 in) | Connecticut Sun | (United States) |
| G/F | 21 | Alice Kunek | 27 – 6 January 1991 | 1.85 m (6 ft 1 in) | Perth Lynx | (Australia) |
| G | 35 | Nicole Seekamp | 25 – 26 April 1992 | 1.78 m (5 ft 10 in) | Adelaide Lightning | (Australia) |

Head coach

- (Australia) Sandy Brondello

Assistant coach(es)

- (Australia) Cheryl Chambers
- (Australia) Paul Goriss

Legend

- (C) Team captain
- Club – describes last
  club before the tournament
- Age – describes age
  on 5 April 2018

Pool A

| Pos | Team | Pld | W | L | PF | PA | PD | Pts | Qualification |
|---|---|---|---|---|---|---|---|---|---|
| 1 | Australia (H) | 3 | 3 | 0 | 331 | 169 | +162 | 6 | Semi-finals |
| 2 | Canada | 3 | 2 | 1 | 226 | 207 | +19 | 5 | Semi-finals |
| 3 | England | 3 | 1 | 2 | 187 | 249 | −62 | 4 | Qualifying finals |
| 4 | Mozambique | 3 | 0 | 3 | 157 | 276 | −119 | 3 | Qualifying finals |

Source: GC2018
Rules for classification: 1) Points; 2) Head-to-head results; 3) Points difference; 4) Points scored.
(H) Hosts

6 April 2018
21:00

Boxscore

| Australia | 113–53 | Mozambique |
Scoring by quarter: 25–9, 25–11, 36–14, 27–19
| Pts: Cambage 24; Rebs: George 11; Asts: George, Griffin 5 | | Pts: Gimo 18; Rebs: Mucauro 9 Asts: Zita 3 |

Townsville Entertainment and Convention Centre, Townsville
Referees: Joyce Muchenu (ZIM), Ho Shuet Mei (SGP), Matthew Bathurst (NZL)

8 April 2018
18:30

Boxscore

| Australia | 100–61 | Canada |
Scoring by quarter: 28–7, 22–13, 19–22, 31–19
| Pts: Cambage 23; Rebs: George 8 Asts: Seekamp 4 | | Pts: Kiss-Rusk 15; Rebs: Kiss-Rusk 9 Asts: Boiago, Colley 4 |

Townsville Entertainment and Convention Centre, Townsville
Referees: Snehal Bendke (IND), Ryan Jones (NZL), Sandy Ng (MAS)

9 April 2018
17:30

Boxscore

| England | 55–118 | Australia |
Scoring by quarter: 15–31, 9–30, 18–33, 13–24
| Pts: three players 9 Rebs: Allen 7 Asts: Fong 4 | | Pts: Cambage 30; Rebs: George 10; Asts: Lavey 7 |

Townsville Entertainment and Convention Centre, Townsville
Referees: Takaki Kato (JPN), Kingsley Ojeaburu (NGR), Joyce Muchenu (ZIM)

Semi-final

13 April 2018
21:00

Boxscore

| Australia | 109–50 | New Zealand |
Scoring by quarter: 25–12, 28–16, 30–6, 26–16
| Pts: Cambage 21; Rebs: Griffin, Kunek 7 Asts: O'Hea 6 | | Pts: three players 9 Rebs: Paalvast 5 Asts: Cocks, Purcell 3 |

Gold Coast Convention and Exhibition Centre, Gold Coast
Referees: Wojciech Liszka (POL), Viola Gyoergyi (NOR), Chris Dodds (GBR)

Gold medal match

14 April 2018
20:30

Boxscore

| Australia | 99–55 | England |
Scoring by quarter: 26–10, 23–21, 29–16, 21–8
| Pts: George, Griffin 16; Rebs: George 10; Asts: Ebzery 7 | | Pts: Stewart 13; Rebs: Emanuel-Carr, Vanderwal 5 Asts: Vanderwal 4 |

Gold Coast Convention and Exhibition Centre, Gold Coast
Referees: Christine Vuong (CAN), Ryan Jones (NZL), Viola Györgyi (NOR)

== Beach volleyball ==
Team of four athletes was announced on 24 February 2018.

| Athlete | Event | Preliminary round | | | | Quarterfinals | Semifinals | Final / GM | |
| Athlete | Event | Opposition Score | Opposition Score | Opposition Score | Rank | Opposition Score | Opposition Score | Opposition Score | Rank |
|---|---|---|---|---|---|---|---|---|---|
| Chris McHugh; Damien Schumann | Men's | Cavula; Korowale (FIJ); W 2–0 (21–9, 21–9) | Hodge; Seabrookes (SKN); W 2–0 (21–3, 21–11) | Stewart; Williams (TTO); W 2–0 (21–13, 21–12) | 1 Q | Kamara; Lombi (SLE); W 2–0 (21–12, 21–14) | Gregory; Sheaf (ENG); W 2–0 (21–13, 21–16) | Pedlow; Schachter (CAN); W 2–1 (21–19, 18–21, 18–16) | 1st place, gold medalist(s) |
| Mariafe Artacho; Taliqua Clancy | Women's | Angelopoulou; Konstantinou (CYP); W 2–0 (21–14, 21–9) | Stafford; Williams (GRN); W 2–0 (21–2, 21–11) | Beattie; Coutts (SCO); W 2–0 (21–9, 21–9) | 1 Q | Mutatsimpundu; Nzayisenga (RWA); W 2–0 (21–9, 21–8) | Matauata; Pata (VAN); W 2–1 (21–19, 16–21, 15–9) | Humana-Paredes; Pavan (CAN); L 0–2 (19–21, 20–22) | 2nd place, silver medalist(s) |

== Boxing ==
Team of thirteen boxers was selected on 14 December 2017. Twelve boxers were making their Commonwealth Games debut.

Men

| Athlete | Event | Round of 32 | Round of 16 | Quarterfinals | Semifinals | Final | |
| Athlete | Event | Opposition Result | Opposition Result | Opposition Result | Opposition Result | Opposition Result | Rank |
|---|---|---|---|---|---|---|---|
| Jack Bowen | 56kg | —N/a | Walker (NIR); L 1–4 | Did not advance | | | |
| Harry Garside | 60kg | Omar (GHA); W 5–0 | Ndevelo (NAM); W 5–0 | Collins (SCO); W 5–0 | McDonagh (WAL); W 3–2 | Kaushik (IND); W 3–2 | 1st place, gold medalist(s) |
| Liam Wilson | 64kg | Bye | Ume (PNG); W 5–0 | McCormack (ENG); L 0–5 | Did not advance | | |
| Terry Nickolas | 69kg | Hield (BAH); W 5–0 | Dlamini (SWZ); W 5–0 | Kumar (IND); L 1–4 | Did not advance | | |
| Campbell Somerville | 75kg | Redhead (GRN); W RSC | Yadav (IND); L 0–5 | Did not advance | | | |
| Clay Waterman | 81kg | —N/a | Lazzerini (SCO); W 4–1 | Kaonga (ZAM); W 4–1 | Lee (WAL); L 1–4 | —N/a | 3rd place, bronze medalist(s) |
| Jason Whateley | 91kg | —N/a | Bye | Sullivan (NIR); W 4–1 | Tanwar (IND); W 4–0 | Nyika (NZL); L 0–5 | 2nd place, silver medalist(s) |
| Toese Vousiutu | 91+kg | —N/a | Bye | Clarke (ENG); L 0–5 | Did not advance | | |

Women

| Athlete | Event | Round of 16 | Quarterfinals | Semifinals | Final | |
| Athlete | Event | Opposition Result | Opposition Result | Opposition Result | Opposition Result | Rank |
|---|---|---|---|---|---|---|
| Taylah Robertson | 51kg | —N/a | Bye | Whiteside (ENG); L 2–3 | —N/a | 3rd place, bronze medalist(s) |
| Skye Nicolson | 57kg | Bye | Ndiang (CMR); W 5–0 | Aubin-Bocher (CAN); W 4–1 | Walsh (NIR); W 3–2 | 1st place, gold medalist(s) |
| Anja Stridsman | 60kg | Bye | Devi (IND); W 5–0 | Garton (NZL); W 5–0 | Murney (ENG); W 5–0 | 1st place, gold medalist(s) |
| Kaye Scott | 69kg | Bye | Oriola (NGR); W 5–0 | Eccles (WAL); L 1–4 | —N/a | 3rd place, bronze medalist(s) |
| Caitlin Parker | 75kg | Bye | Gale (ENG); W 5–0 | Agoegbulem (NGR); W 5–0 | Price (WAL); L 1–4 | 2nd place, silver medalist(s) |

== Cycling ==
Team of 36 athletes was announced on 20 February 2018.

=== Road ===
Men

| Athlete | Event | Time | Rank |
|---|---|---|---|
| Mitchell Docker | Road race | 3:59:39 | 43 |
| Alex Edmondson | Road race | 4:06:36 | 46 |
| Mathew Hayman | Road race | 3:58:07 | 25 |
| Cameron Meyer | Road race | 3:57:01 | 9 |
| Callum Scotson | Road race | 4:06:36 | 47 |
| Steele Von Hoff | Road race | 3:57:01 | 1st place, gold medalist(s) |
| Callum Scotson | Time trial | 49:35.65 | 4 |
| Cameron Meyer | Time trial | 48:13.04 | 1st place, gold medalist(s) |

Women

| Athlete | Event | Time | Rank |
|---|---|---|---|
| Tiffany Cromwell | Road race | 3:02:21 | 6 |
| Gracie Elvin | Road race | 3:03:32 | 22 |
| Katrin Garfoot | Road race | 3:02:47 | 13 |
| Chloe Hosking | Road race | 3:02:18 | 1st place, gold medalist(s) |
| Shannon Malseed | Road race | 3:05:40 | 24 |
| Sarah Roy | Road race | 3:02:18 | 5 |
| Katrin Garfoot | Time trial | 35:08.09 | 1st place, gold medalist(s) |

=== Track ===
Sprint

| Athlete | Event | Qualification | | Round 1 | Quarterfinals | Semifinals | Final / BM | |
| Athlete | Event | Time | Rank | Opposition Time | Opposition Time | Opposition Time | Opposition Time | Rank |
|---|---|---|---|---|---|---|---|---|
| Patrick Constable | Men's sprint | 9.890 | 14 Q | Mitchell (NZL); L 10.656 | Did not advance | | | |
| Matthew Glaetzer | Men's sprint | 9.583 GR | 1 Q | Sahrom (MAS); L 10.720 | Did not advance | | | |
| Jacob Schmid | Men's sprint | 9.690 | 6 Q | Ritter (CAN); W 10.367 | Mitchell (NZL); W 10.257, 10.335 | Carlin (SCO); L 10.271, 10.440 QB | Sahrom (MAS); W 10.327, 10.475 | 3rd place, bronze medalist(s) |
| Patrick Constable; Matthew Glaetzer; Nathan Hart | Men's team sprint | 44.205 | 3 QB | —N/a | | | Canada; W 43.645 | 3rd place, bronze medalist(s) |
| Bradley Henderson; Thomas Clarke (pilot) | Men's tandem sprint B & VI | —N/a | | | | Fachie; Rotherham (pilot) (ENG); L 10.587, L 11.898 QB | Rizann; Muhammad Rasol (pilot) (MAS); W 10.511, W 10.653 | 3rd place, bronze medalist(s) |
| Kaarle McCulloch | Women's sprint | 10.777 | 4 Q | Deborah (IND); W 11.911 | Podmore (NZL); W 11.487 | Morton (AUS); L 11.243, L 11.800 | Genest (CAN); W 11.638, W 11.853 | 3rd place, bronze medalist(s) |
| Stephanie Morton | Women's sprint | 10.524 GR | 1 Q | Reji (IND); W 11.503 | Cumming (NZL); W 11.814 | McCulloch (AUS); W 11.134, W 11.312 | Hansen (NZL); W 11.262, W 11.405 | 1st place, gold medalist(s) |
| Kaarle McCulloch; Stephanie Morton | Women's team sprint | 32.578 GR | 1 Q | —N/a | | | New Zealand; W 32.488 | 1st place, gold medalist(s) |
| Jessica Gallagher; Madison Janssen (pilot) | Women's tandem sprint B & VI | 10.954 | 2 Q | —N/a | | | Scott; Thornhill (ENG); L 11.694, L 12.196 | 2* |

Qualification legend: Q – Qualify to next round/gold medal round, QB – Qualify to bronze medal round.
* – Due to only three nations participating in the event, no silver or bronze medals were awarded in accordance with Commonwealth Games regulations.

Keirin

| Athlete | Event | Round 1 | Repechage | Semifinals | Final |
|---|---|---|---|---|---|
| Patrick Constable | Men's keirin | 1 Q | Bye | 5 | 8 |
| Matthew Glaetzer | Men's keirin | 1 Q | Bye | 1 Q | 1st place, gold medalist(s) |
| Jacob Schmid | Men's keirin | 2 Q | Bye | 6 | 9 |
| Kaarle McCulloch | Women's keirin | 2 Q | Bye | 1 Q | 2nd place, silver medalist(s) |
| Stephanie Morton | Women's keirin | 1 Q | Bye | 1 Q | 1st place, gold medalist(s) |

Pursuit

| Athlete | Event | Qualification | | Final / BM | |
| Athlete | Event | Time | Rank | Opponent Results | Rank |
|---|---|---|---|---|---|
| Jordan Kerby | Men's pursuit | 4:13.531 | 4 QB | Kennett (NZL); 4:22.462 L | 4 |
| Kelland O'Brien | Men's pursuit | 4:17.401 | 7 | Did not advance | |
| Sam Welsford | Men's pursuit | 4:13.595 | 5 | Did not advance | |
| Leigh Howard; Jordan Kerby*; Kelland O'Brien; Alexander Porter; Sam Welsford | Men's team pursuit | 3:52.041 GR | 1 Q | England; W 3:49.804 WR | 1st place, gold medalist(s) |
| Ashlee Ankudinoff | Women's pursuit | 3:27.624 | 4 QB | Edmondson (AUS); 3:31.093 L | 4 |
| Annette Edmondson | Women's pursuit | 3:27.255 | 3 QB | Ankudinoff (AUS); 3:30.922 W | 3rd place, bronze medalist(s) |
| Rebecca Wiasak | Women's pursuit | 3:25.936 | 2 Q | Archibald (SCO); 3:27.548 L | 2nd place, silver medalist(s) |
| Ashlee Ankudinoff; Amy Cure; Annette Edmondson; Alexandra Manly | Women's team pursuit | 4:17.218 GR | 1 Q | New Zealand; W 4:15.214 GR | 1st place, gold medalist(s) |

Qualification Legend: Q – Athlete qualified to next round/gold medal round, QB – Athlete qualified to bronze medal round.
* – Athlete cycled in preliminary round(s) but not in the final.

Time trial

| Athlete | Event | Time | Rank |
|---|---|---|---|
| Patrick Constable | Men's time trial | 1:01.438 | 6 |
| Matthew Glaetzer | Men's time trial | 59.340 GR | 1st place, gold medalist(s) |
| Nick Yallouris | Men's time trial | 1:01.945 | 10 |
| Bradley Henderson; Thomas Clarke (pilot) | Men's tandem time trial B & VI | 1:01.512 | 3rd place, bronze medalist(s) |
| Kaarle McCulloch | Women's time trial | 33.583 | 1st place, gold medalist(s) |
| Stephanie Morton | Women's time trial | 33.619 | 2nd place, silver medalist(s) |
| Jessica Gallagher; Madison Janssen (pilot) | Women's tandem time trial B & VI | 1:07.165 | 2* |

Qualification legend: * – Due to only three nations participating in the event, no silver or bronze medals were awarded in accordance with Commonwealth Games regulations.

Points race

| Athlete | Event | Qualification | | Final | |
| Athlete | Event | Points | Rank | Points | Rank |
|---|---|---|---|---|---|
| Leigh Howard | Men's points race | 10 | 5 Q | −38 | 21 |
| Cameron Meyer | Men's points race | 25 | 4 Q | 50 | 4 |
| Kelland O'Brien | Men's points race | 8 | 10 | 45 | 8 |
| Georgia Baker | Women's points race | —N/a | | 0 | 21 |
| Amy Cure | Women's points race | —N/a | | 7 | 8 |
| Alexandra Manly | Women's points race | —N/a | | 14 | 4 |

Scratch race

| Athlete | Event | Qualification | Final |
|---|---|---|---|
| Leigh Howard | Men's scratch race | 3 Q | DNF |
| Cameron Meyer | Men's scratch race | 4 Q | 10 |
| Sam Welsford | Men's scratch race | 3 Q | 1st place, gold medalist(s) |
| Ashlee Ankudinoff | Women's scratch race | —N/a | 17 |
| Amy Cure | Women's scratch race | —N/a | 1st place, gold medalist(s) |
| Annette Edmondson | Women's scratch race | —N/a | 14 |

=== Mountain biking ===
| Athlete | Event | Time | Rank |
|---|---|---|---|
| Daniel McConnell | Men's cross-country | 1:19:59 | 7 |
| Rebecca McConnell | Women's cross-country | 1:22:32 | 6 |

== Diving ==
Team of 14 divers was announced on 5 February 2018. Taneka Kovchenko was forced to withdraw from the Team just prior to the Games due to the risk of serious injury. She was replaced by Teju Williamson.

Men

| Athlete | Event | Preliminaries | | Final | |
| Athlete | Event | Points | Rank | Points | Rank |
|---|---|---|---|---|---|
| Matthew Carter | 1 m springboard | 361.45 | 5 Q | 368.30 | 8 |
| Kurtis Mathews | 1 m springboard | 258.15 | 12 Q | 367.60 | 9 |
| James Connor | 1 m springboard | 354.45 | 6 Q | 412.45 | 2nd place, silver medalist(s) |
| Matthew Carter | 3 m springboard | 436.25 | 2 Q | 409.00 | 6 |
| Kurtis Mathews | 3 m springboard | 286.35 | 17 | Did not advance | |
| James Connor | 3 m springboard | 389.55 | 8 Q | 438.50 | 3rd place, bronze medalist(s) |
| Domonic Bedggood | 10 m platform | 393.75 | 4 Q | 451.15 | 1st place, gold medalist(s) |
| Matthew Barnard | 10 m platform | 319.95 | 11 Q | 350.35 | 10 |
| Declan Stacey | 10 m platform | 401.75 | 3 Q | 393.20 | 7 |
| Domonic Bedggood; Matthew Carter | 3 m synchronised springboard | —N/a | | 408.12 | 3rd place, bronze medalist(s) |
| James Connor; Kurtis Mathews | 3 m synchronised springboard | —N/a | | 370.17 | 6 |
| Domonic Bedggood; Declan Stacey | 10 m synchronised platform | —N/a | | 397.92 | 3rd place, bronze medalist(s) |

Women

| Athlete | Event | Preliminaries | | Final | |
| Athlete | Event | Points | Rank | Points | Rank |
|---|---|---|---|---|---|
| Esther Qin | 1 m springboard | 273.80 | 1 Q | 252.95 | 3rd place, bronze medalist(s) |
| Georgia Sheehan | 1 m springboard | 263.75 | 2 Q | 264.00 | 2nd place, silver medalist(s) |
| Maddison Keeney | 3 m springboard | 302.50 | 6 Q | 366.55 | 2nd place, silver medalist(s) |
| Esther Qin | 3 m springboard | 332.10 | 1 Q | 294.60 | 5 |
| Anabelle Smith | 3 m springboard | 272.85 | 8 Q | 336.90 | 3rd place, bronze medalist(s) |
| Teju Williamson | 10 m platform | 293.80 | 8 Q | 276.35 | 11 |
| Brittany O'Brien | 10 m platform | 304.75 | 7 Q | 322.50 | 7 |
| Melissa Wu | 10 m platform | 327.20 | 3 Q | 360.40 | 1st place, gold medalist(s) |
| Maddison Keeney; Anabelle Smith | 3 m synchronised springboard | —N/a | | 224.31 | 7 |
| Esther Qin; Georgia Sheehan | 3 m synchronised springboard | —N/a | | 284.10 | 1st place, gold medalist(s) |
| Teju Williamson; Melissa Wu | 10 m synchronised platform | —N/a | | 307.80 | 4 |
| Brittany O'Brien; Anna Rose Keating | 10 m synchronised platform | —N/a | | 273.15 | 6 |

== Gymnastics ==
Team of thirteen athletes announced on 28 February 2018. Team consists of five artistic men, five artistic women and three rhythmic women.

=== Artistic ===
Men
Team

| Athlete | Event | Apparatus | | | | | | Total | Rank |
| Athlete | Event | F | PH | R | V | PB | HB | Total | Rank |
|---|---|---|---|---|---|---|---|---|---|
| Michael Mercieca | Team | 12.950 | 12.050 | 12.900 | 13.450 | 13.600 | 12.850 | 77.800 | 13 Q |
| Mitchell Morgans | Team | —N/a | | | | 12.500 | 13.700 | —N/a | |
| Christopher Remkes | Team | 13.250 | 13.750 Q | —N/a | 14.950 Q | —N/a | | | |
| Michael Tone | Team | 11.600 | 13.850 Q | 13.375 | 13.500 | 12.950 | 13.200 Q | 78.745 | 11 Q |
| Luke Wadsworth | Team | —N/a | 12.300 | 13.150 | —N/a | 13.250 | 11.650 | —N/a | |
| Total | Team | 37.800 | 39.900 | 39.425 | 41.900 | 40.550 | 38.550 | 238.125 | 5 |

Individual

| Athlete | Event | Apparatus | | | | | | Total | Rank |
| Athlete | Event | F | PH | R | V | PB | HB | Total | Rank |
|---|---|---|---|---|---|---|---|---|---|
| Michael Mercieca | All-around | 13.100 | 12.850 | 13.400 | 13.750 | 14.100 | 14.150 | 81.350 | 5 |
| Michael Tone | All-around | 12.750 | 13.850 | 13.050 | 13.850 | 12.850 | 12.100 | 78.450 | 8 |
| Christopher Remkes | Pommel horse | —N/a | 13.733 | —N/a | | | | 13.733 | 6 |
| Michael Tone | Pommel horse | —N/a | 12.433 | —N/a | | | | 12.433 | 7 |
| Christopher Remkes | Vault | —N/a | | | 14.799 | —N/a | | 14.799 | 1st place, gold medalist(s) |
| Michael Tone | Horizontal bar | —N/a | | | | | 12.733 | 12.733 | 5 |

Women
Team

| Athlete | Event | Apparatus | | | | Total | Rank |
| Athlete | Event | V | UB | BB | F | Total | Rank |
|---|---|---|---|---|---|---|---|
| Georgia-Rose Brown | Team | 13.600 | 14.000 Q | 12.650 Q | 12.450 Q | 52.700 | 5 Q |
| Alexandra Eade | Team | —N/a | | | 13.250 Q | —N/a | |
| Georgia Godwin | Team | 13.600 Q | 13.80 Q | 11.950 | 11.800 | 51.150 | 8 Q |
| Rianna Mizzen | Team | 13.700 | 11.900 | 11.700 | 12.400 | 49.700 | 10 |
| Emily Whitehead | Team | 14.050 Q | 13.150 | 12.450 Q | —N/a | | |
| Total | Team | 41.350 | 40.950 | 37.050 | 38.100 | 157.450 | 3rd place, bronze medalist(s) |

Individual

| Athlete | Event | Apparatus | | | | Total | Rank |
| Athlete | Event | V | UB | BB | F | Total | Rank |
|---|---|---|---|---|---|---|---|
| Georgia-Rose Brown | All-around | 13.600 | 13.700 | 12.750 | 12.950 | 53.000 | 4 |
| Georgia Godwin | All-around | 13.800 | 13.750 | 13.150 | 13.100 | 53.800 | 2nd place, silver medalist(s) |
| Georgia Godwin | Vault | 13.650 | —N/a | | | 13.650 | 6 |
| Emily Whitehead | Vault | 13.849 | —N/a | | | 13.849 | 3rd place, bronze medalist(s) |
| Georgia-Rose Brown | Uneven bars | —N/a | 13.233 | —N/a | | 13.233 | 4 |
| Georgia Godwin | Uneven bars | —N/a | 13.433 | —N/a | | 13.433 | 3rd place, bronze medalist(s) |
| Georgia-Rose Brown | Balance beam | —N/a | | 13.066 | —N/a | 13.066 | 2nd place, silver medalist(s) |
| Emily Whitehead | Balance beam | —N/a | | 12.500 | —N/a | 12.500 | 5 |
| Georgia-Rose Brown | Floor | —N/a | | | 13.100 | 13.100 | 5 |
| Alexandra Eade | Floor | —N/a | | | 13.333 | 13.333 | 1st place, gold medalist(s) |

=== Rhythmic ===
Team

| Athlete | Event | Apparatus | | | | Total | Rank |
| Athlete | Event | Hoop | Ball | Clubs | Ribbon | Total | Rank |
|---|---|---|---|---|---|---|---|
| Alexandra Kiroi-Bogatyreva | Team | 12.550 | 12.250 Q | 11.450 | 11.200 Q | 47.450 | 8 Q |
| Danielle Prince | Team | 13.100 | 12.150 Q | 11.400 | 10.550 | 47.200 | 10 |
| Enid Sung | Team | 13.450 Q | 11.150 | 12.100 Q | 10.750 Q | 47.450 | 7 Q |
| Total | Team | 39.100 | 35.550 | 34.950 | 11.200 | 120.800 | 3rd place, bronze medalist(s) |

Individual

| Athlete | Event | Apparatus | | | | Total | Rank |
| Athlete | Event | Hoop | Ball | Clubs | Ribbon | Total | Rank |
|---|---|---|---|---|---|---|---|
| Alexandra Kiroi-Bogatyreva | All-around | 11.950 | 12.500 | 10.500 | 11.150 | 46.100 | 10 |
| Enid Sung | All-around | 13.100 | 12.525 | 13.250 | 11.850 | 50.725 | 4 |
| Enid Sung | Hoop | 13.400 | —N/a | | | 13.400 | 4 |
| Alexandra Kiroi-Bogatyreva | Ball | —N/a | 13.250 | —N/a | | 13.250 | 3rd place, bronze medalist(s) |
| Danielle Prince | Ball | —N/a | 7.600 | —N/a | | 7.600 | 8 |
| Enid Sung | Clubs | —N/a | | 9.850 | —N/a | 9.850 | 8 |
| Alexandra Kiroi-Bogatyreva | Ribbon | —N/a | | | 11.350 | 11.350 | 5 |
| Enid Sung | Ribbon | —N/a | | | 10.200 | 10.200 | 6 |

== Field hockey ==
Summary

| Team | Event | Preliminary round | | | | | Semifinal | Final / BM / PM | |
| Team | Event | Opposition Result | Opposition Result | Opposition Result | Opposition Result | Rank | Opposition Result | Opposition Result | Rank |
|---|---|---|---|---|---|---|---|---|---|
| Australia men's | Men's tournament | South Africa; W 4–0 | Scotland; W 6–1 | Canada; W 4–0 | New Zealand; W 2–1 | 1 Q | England; W 2–1 | New Zealand; W 2–0 | 1st place, gold medalist(s) |
| Australia women's | Women's tournament | Canada; W 1–0 | Ghana; W 5–0 | New Zealand; D 0–0 | Scotland; W 2–0 | 1 Q | India; W 1–0 | New Zealand; L 1–4 | 2nd place, silver medalist(s) |

=== Men's tournament ===
On 6 April, Blake Govers was ruled out with a broken finger and replaced with Tom Wickham.

Roster

- Daniel Beale
- Andrew Charter
- Tom Craig
- Matt Dawson
- Jeremy Edwards
- Jake Harvie
- Jeremy Hayward
- Aaron Kleinschmidt
- Mark Knowles(c)
- Tyler Lovell
- Trent Mitton
- Eddie Ockenden
- Flynn Ogilvie
- Lachlan Sharp
- Jacob Whetton
- Tom Wickham
- Dylan Wotherspoon
- Aran Zalewski

Pool A

| Pos | Team | Pld | W | D | L | GF | GA | GD | Pts | Qualification |
|---|---|---|---|---|---|---|---|---|---|---|
| 1 | Australia (H) | 4 | 4 | 0 | 0 | 16 | 2 | +14 | 12 | Advance to Semi-finals |
| 2 | New Zealand | 4 | 3 | 0 | 1 | 18 | 6 | +12 | 9 | Advance to Semi-finals |
| 3 | Scotland | 4 | 1 | 0 | 3 | 7 | 14 | −7 | 3 | 5th–6th place match |
| 4 | Canada | 4 | 1 | 0 | 3 | 3 | 12 | −9 | 3 | 7th–8th place match |
| 5 | South Africa | 4 | 1 | 0 | 3 | 4 | 14 | −10 | 3 | 9th–10th place match |

Source: FIH
Rules for classification: 1) points; 2) number of wins; 3) goal difference; 4) goals scored; 5) head-to-head results.
(H) Hosts

7 April 2018
16:30

| Australia | 4–0 | South Africa |
|---|---|---|
| Mitton 30', 39'; Hayward 43'; Kleinschmidt 50' | Report |

Umpires:
Anbananthan Rawi (MAS)
Tyler Klenk (CAN)

8 April 2018
21:30

| Australia | 6–1 | Scotland |
|---|---|---|
| Zalewski 2'; Beale 2'; Wickham 13'; Wotherspoon 15'; Ogilvie 20'; Kleinschmidt 43' | Report | Harwood 23' |

Umpires:
Eric Koh (MAS)
Anbananthan Rawi (MAS)

10 April 2018
16:30

| Australia | 4–0 | Canada |
|---|---|---|
| Wotherspoon 12', 14'; Hayward 15'; Mitton 54' | Report |

Umpires:
David Sweetman (SCO)
Tim Bond (NZL)

11 April 2018
16:30

| Australia | 2–1 | New Zealand |
|---|---|---|
| Whetton 20'; Mitton 57' | Report | Bennett 59' |

Umpires:
David Sweetman (SCO)
Hong Zhen Lim (SGP)

Semi-final

13 April 2018
19:30

| Australia | 2–1 | England |
|---|---|---|
| Mitton 1', 49' | Report | Sloan 37' |

Umpires:
Sean Rapaport (RSA)
David Sweetman (SCO)

Gold medal match

14 April 2018
21:15

| Australia | 2–0 | New Zealand |
|---|---|---|
| Kleinschmidt 21'; Dawson 28' | Report |

Umpires:
Sean Rapaport (RSA)
Lim Hong Zhen (SGP)

=== Women's tournament ===
Roster

- Jocelyn Bartram
- Edwina Bone
- Jane Claxton
- Ashlea Fey
- Savannah Fitzpatrick
- Jordyn Holzberger
- Emily Hurtz
- Jodie Kenny
- Stephanie Kershaw
- Rachael Lynch
- Karri McMahon
- Gabrielle Nance
- Kaitlin Nobbs
- Brooke Peris
- Madi Ratcliffe
- Emily Smith (c)
- Grace Stewart
- Renee Taylor

Pool B

| Pos | Team | Pld | W | D | L | GF | GA | GD | Pts | Qualification |
|---|---|---|---|---|---|---|---|---|---|---|
| 1 | Australia (H) | 4 | 3 | 1 | 0 | 8 | 0 | +8 | 10 | Advance to Semi-finals |
| 2 | New Zealand | 4 | 2 | 2 | 0 | 18 | 1 | +17 | 8 | Advance to Semi-finals |
| 3 | Canada | 4 | 1 | 2 | 1 | 5 | 2 | +3 | 5 | 5th–6th place match |
| 4 | Scotland | 4 | 1 | 1 | 2 | 6 | 8 | −2 | 4 | 7th–8th place match |
| 5 | Ghana | 4 | 0 | 0 | 4 | 1 | 27 | −26 | 0 | 9th–10th place match |

Source: FIH
Rules for classification: 1) points; 2) number of wins; 3) goal difference; 4) goals scored; 5) head-to-head results.
(H) Hosts

5 April 2018
16:30

| Australia | 1–0 | Canada |
|---|---|---|
| Kenny 25' | Report |

Umpires:
Emma Shelbourn (GBR)
Wanri Venter (RSA)

7 April 2018
21:30

| Australia | 5–0 | Ghana |
|---|---|---|
| Bone 2'; Kenny 7', 30'; Claxton 14'; Peris 41' | Report |

Umpires:
Sarah Wilson (SCO)
Durgi Devi (IND)

9 April 2018
21:30

| Australia | 0–0 | New Zealand |
|---|---|---|
| | Report |

Umpires:
Sarah Wilson (SCO)
Ayanna McClean (TTO)

10 April 2018
21:30

| Australia | 2–0 | Scotland |
|---|---|---|
| Kenny 12'; Stewart 41' | Report |

Umpires:
Durgi Devi (IND)
Lelia Sacre (CAN)

Semi-final

12 April 2018
21:15

| Australia | 1–0 | India |
|---|---|---|
| Stewart 37' | Report |

Umpires:
Ayanna McClean (TTO)
Lelia Sacre (CAN)

Gold medal match

14 April 2018
12:45

| New Zealand | 4–1 | Australia |
|---|---|---|
| Gloyn 28'; Keddell 34'; Merry 42'; McLaren 56' | Report | Kenny 50' |

Umpires:
Sarah Wilson (SCO)
Ayanna McClean (TTO)

== Lawn bowls ==
17 person team was announced on 5 December 2017.

Men

| Athlete | Event | Preliminary round | | | | | | Quarterfinal | Semifinal | Final / BM | |
| Athlete | Event | Opposition Result | Opposition Result | Opposition Result | Opposition Result | Opposition Result | Rank | Opposition Result | Opposition Result | Opposition Result | Rank |
|---|---|---|---|---|---|---|---|---|---|---|---|
| Aaron Wilson | Singles | Paniani (COK); W 21–6 | Aquilina (MLT); W 21–17 | Jones (NFI); W 21–18 | Breitenbach (RSA); W 21–6 | Salmon (WAL); W 21–16 | 1 Q | Kelly (NIR); W 21–9 | Paxton (ENG); W 21–16 | Bester (CAN); W 21–14 | 1st place, gold medalist(s) |
| Aaron Wilson; Brett Wilkie | Pairs | Aquilina; Parnis (MLT); W 22–11 | Ahad; Tengah (BRU); W 30–7 | Le Ber; Solway (GUE); W 18–15 | Bester; Stadnyk (CAN); W 15–12 | —N/a | 1 Q | Aquilina; Parnis (MLT); L 13–15 | Did not advance | | |
| Barrie Lester; Nathan Rice; Aron Sherriff | Triples | Jersey; L 18–21 | Botswana; W 33–4 | Fiji; W 28–3 | Brunei; W 29–4 | —N/a | 2 Q | New Zealand; W 25–10 | Canada; W 20–5 | Scotland; L 14–19 | 2nd place, silver medalist(s) |
| Barrie Lester; Brett Wilkie; Nathan Rice; Aron Sherriff | Fours | Botswana; W 21–5 | India; L 15–19 | Norfolk Island; W 24–10 | South Africa; W 27–6 | —N/a | 2 Q | Northern Ireland; W 13–9 | Wales; W 15–5 | Scotland; L 13–15 | 2nd place, silver medalist(s) |

Women

| Athlete | Event | Preliminary round | | | | | | Quarterfinals | Semifinals | Final / BM | |
| Athlete | Event | Opposition Result | Opposition Result | Opposition Result | Opposition Result | Opposition Result | Rank | Opposition Result | Opposition Result | Opposition Result | Rank |
|---|---|---|---|---|---|---|---|---|---|---|---|
| Karen Murphy | Singles | Kioa (TGA); W 21–4 | Siame (ZAM); W 21–3 | Piketh (RSA); W 21–16 | Beattie (NIR); W 21–17 | —N/a | 1 Q | Piketh (RSA); L 19–21 | Did not advance | | |
| Kelsey Cottrell; Karen Murphy | Pairs | Banda; Mpezeni (ZAM); W 24–5 | Blumsky; Papani (NIU); W 35–11 | C Rixon; R Rixon (MLT); W 18–14 | Walo; Wimp (PNG); W 29–7 | Chestney; Tolchard (ENG); W 20–14 | 1 Q | Doig; Johnston (SCO); L 15–16 | Did not advance | | |
| Carla Krizanic; Natasha Scott; Rebecca Van Asch | Triples | Papua New Guinea; W 32–12 | India; W 20–11 | Canada; W 20–13 | Fiji; W 24–9 | —N/a | 1 Q | Northern Ireland; W 30–11 | England; W 16–13 | Scotland; W 21–12 | 1st place, gold medalist(s) |
| Kelsey Cottrell; Carla Krizanic; Rebecca Van Asch; Natasha Scott | Fours | Papua New Guinea; W 41–1 | Cook Islands; W 15–9 | Namibia; W 23–9 | Malaysia; W 14–13 | —N/a | 1 Q | Malaysia; W 14–12 | Canada; W 10–9 | South Africa; W 18–16 | 1st place, gold medalist(s) |

Mixed para-sport

| Athlete | Event | Preliminary round | | | | | | Semifinals | Final | |
| Athlete | Event | Opposition Result | Opposition Result | Opposition Result | Opposition Result | Opposition Result | Rank | Opposition Result | Opposition Result | Rank |
|---|---|---|---|---|---|---|---|---|---|---|
| Jake Fehlberg; Grant Fehlberg (Director); Lynne Seymour; Robert Seymour (Director) | Pairs | South Africa; W 26–3 | England; L 16–17 | New Zealand; W 16–11 | Wales; W 18–6 | Scotland; L 11–15 | 2 Q | Scotland; W 14–8 | South Africa; W 12–9 | 1st place, gold medalist(s) |
| Anthony Bonnell; Ken Hanson; Joshua Thornton | Triples | Scotland; W 18–6 | South Africa; W 13–10 | England; L 12–16 | Wales; W 22–12 | New Zealand; W 16–11 | 1 Q | South Africa; W 15–7 | New Zealand; W 14–13 | 1st place, gold medalist(s) |

Officials: Team Leader – Peter Brown; Head Coach – Steve Glasson; Coaches – Kelvin Kerkow, Gary Willis; Team Manager – Faye Luke; Sport Psychologist – Mark McMahon – Sport Psychologist

== Netball ==
Australia qualified a netball team by virtue of being the host country of the event.

Summary

| Team | Event | Preliminary round | | | | | | Semifinal | Final / BM / PM | |
| Team | Event | Opposition Result | Opposition Result | Opposition Result | Opposition Result | Opposition Result | Rank | Opposition Result | Opposition Result | Rank |
|---|---|---|---|---|---|---|---|---|---|---|
| Australia | Tournament | Northern Ireland; W 94–26 | Barbados; W 79–24 | South Africa; W 60–38 | Fiji; W 100–23 | Jamaica; W 72–51 | 1 Q | New Zealand; W 65–44 | England; L 51–52 | 2nd place, silver medalist(s) |

Roster

- Caitlin Bassett (captain)
- April Brandley
- Courtney Bruce
- Laura Geitz
- Susan Pettitt
- Kim Ravaillion
- Madi Robinson
- Gabi Simpson (vice-captain)
- Caitlin Thwaites
- Liz Watson
- Jo Weston
- Stephanie Wood

Pool A

| Pos | Team | Pld | W | D | L | GF | GA | GD | Pts | Qualification |
|---|---|---|---|---|---|---|---|---|---|---|
| 1 | Australia (H) | 5 | 5 | 0 | 0 | 413 | 162 | +251 | 10 | Semi-finals |
| 2 | Jamaica | 5 | 4 | 0 | 1 | 351 | 221 | +130 | 8 | Semi-finals |
| 3 | South Africa | 5 | 3 | 0 | 2 | 310 | 205 | +105 | 6 | Classification matches |
| 4 | Northern Ireland | 5 | 2 | 0 | 3 | 224 | 307 | −83 | 4 | Classification matches |
| 5 | Barbados | 5 | 1 | 0 | 4 | 185 | 333 | −148 | 2 | Classification matches |
| 6 | Fiji | 5 | 0 | 0 | 5 | 171 | 426 | −255 | 0 | Classification matches |

Updated to match(es) played on 11 April 2018. Source: GC2018
(H) Hosts

5 April 2018
20:30

Report
Australia
94–26
Northern Ireland

Gold Coast Convention and Exhibition Centre
Umpires: Maria van der Merwe
Jono Bredin
Reserve umpire: Lisa McPhail
Thwaites 39/39 (100%)
Bassett 31/34 (91%)
Pettitt 13/13 (100%)
Wood 11/15 (73%)

L. Bowman 13/22 (59%)
McCullogh 6/9 (67%)
Lennon 4/6 (67%)
K. Bowman 3/4 (75%)

6 April 2018
20:30

Report
Barbados
24–79
Australia

Gold Coast Convention and Exhibition Centre
Umpires: Lisa McPhail
Kristie Simpson
Reserve umpire: Kate Stephenson
Wharton 12/17 (71%)
Blackman 8/10 (80%)
Payne 4/5 (80%)

Thwaites 24/24 (100%)
Bassett 23/26 (88%)
Wood 17/17 (100%)
Pettitt 15/15 (100%)

8 April 2018
20:30

Report
Australia
60–38
South Africa

Gold Coast Convention and Exhibition Centre
Umpires: Jono Bredin
Lisa McPhail
Reserve umpire: Kate Stephenson
Bassett 20/23 (87%)
Thwaites 15/15 (100%)
Wood 14/15 (93%)
Pettitt 11/11 (100%)

Venter 33/40 (83%)
Holtzhausen 5/10 (50%)

9 April 2018
15:00

Report
Fiji
23–108
Australia

Gold Coast Convention and Exhibition Centre
Umpires: Angela Armstrong-Lush
Kristie Simpson
Reserve umpire: Jackie Mizon
Waqa 15/19 (79%)
M. Rusivakula 8/14 (57%)

Bassett 40/41 (98%)
Thwaites 30/31 (97%)
Pettitt 23/23 (100%)
Wood 15/19 (79%)

11 April 2018
21:00

Report
Australia
72–51
Jamaica

Gold Coast Convention and Exhibition Centre
Umpires: Gary Burgess
Lisa McPhail
Reserve umpire: Kristie Simpson
Bassett 22/23 (96%)
Thwaites 22/22 (100%)
Pettitt 20/21 (95%)
Wood 8/10 (80%)

Fowler-Reid 30/32 (94%)
Aiken 11/14 (79%)
Beckford 8/12 (67%)
Robinson 2/2 (100%)

Semi-final match

14 April 2018
17:00

Report
Australia
65–44
New Zealand

Coomera Indoor Sports Centre
Umpires: Gary Burgess
Jackie Mizon
Reserve umpire: Kate Stephenson
Thwaites 24/25 (96%)
Bassett 17/18 (94%)
Pettitt 15/16 (94%)
Wood 9/12 (75%)

Folau 32/41 (78%)
Ekenasio 7/9 (78%)
Selby-Rickit 3/5 (60%)
Mes 2/3 (67%)

Gold medal match

15 April 2018
13:00

Report
Australia
51–52
England

Coomera Indoor Sports Centre
Umpires: Lisa McPhail
Jono Bredin
Reserve umpire: Angela Armstrong-Lush
Bassett 22/24 (92%)
Wood 12/14 (86%)
Pettitt 11/12 (92%)
Thwaites 6/6 (100%)

Harten 34/39 (87%)
Housby 18/21 (86%)

== Rugby sevens ==
Summary

| Team | Event | Preliminary Round | | | | Semifinal / CS | Final / BM / CF | |
| Team | Event | Opposition Result | Opposition Result | Opposition Result | Rank | Opposition Result | Opposition Result | Rank |
|---|---|---|---|---|---|---|---|---|
| Australia men's | Men's tournament | Samoa; W 24–7 | Jamaica; W 32–5 | England; L 17–26 | 2 | Kenya; W 33–5 | Scotland; W 26–0 | 5 |
| Australia women's | Women's tournament | Wales; W 34–5 | England; W 29–12 | Fiji; W 17–10 | 1 Q | Canada; W 33–7 | New Zealand; L 12–17 | 2nd place, silver medalist(s) |

=== Men's tournament ===
Roster

The following team was announced as the 2018 Commonwealth Games sevens team. Captain Lewis Holland was originally announced as a team player, however, was excluded due to injury, and replaced by Brandon Quinn. Replacement captain James Stannard was also ruled out after a skull fracture resulting from being attacked after a farewell dinner to departing coach Andy Friend.

Head coach: Andy Friend

| No. | Pos. | Player | Date of birth (age) | Union / Club |
|---|---|---|---|---|
| 1 | BK | Charlie Taylor | July 25, 1995 (aged 22) | Manly |
| 2 | FW | Tom Connor | July 29, 1992 (aged 25) | Sydney Rays |
| 3 | FW | Sam Myers | May 25, 1990 (aged 27) | Norths |
| 4 | BK | Tom Lucas | November 23, 1993 (aged 24) | Sunnybank |
| 5 | BK | Brandon Quinn | January 28, 1994 (aged 24) | Australia 7s |
| 6 | BK | John Porch | March 4, 1994 (aged 24) | Norths |
| 7 | FW | Tim Anstee | May 19, 1997 (aged 20) | Eastwood |
| 8 | FW | Jesse Parahi (c) | July 29, 1989 (aged 28) | Norths |
| 9 | FW | Boyd Killingworth | April 6, 1992 (aged 26) | Warringah |
| 10 | BK | Ben O'Donnell | August 14, 1995 (aged 22) | Randwick |
| 11 | BK | Maurice Longbottom | January 30, 1995 (aged 23) | Australia 7s |
| 12 | FW | Lachlan Anderson | August 27, 1997 (aged 20) | Eastwood |

Brandon Quinn replaced captain Lewis Holland who withdrew due to injury. James Stannard was forced to withdraw after being injured during a late night assault and was replaced by Nicholas Price.

Pool B

| Pos | Team | Pld | W | D | L | PF | PA | PD | Pts | Qualification |
|---|---|---|---|---|---|---|---|---|---|---|
| 1 | England | 3 | 3 | 0 | 0 | 97 | 22 | +75 | 9 | Semi-finals |
| 2 | Australia | 3 | 2 | 0 | 1 | 73 | 38 | +35 | 7 | Classification semi-finals |
| 3 | Samoa | 3 | 1 | 0 | 2 | 43 | 64 | −21 | 5 | |
| 4 | Jamaica | 3 | 0 | 0 | 3 | 17 | 106 | −89 | 3 | |

Source: GC2018
Rules for classification: 1) Points; 2) Head-to-head result; 3) Point difference; 4) Points scored.

14 April 2018
9:31

| Australia | 24–7 | Samoa |
| Try: Anderson (2) 3' c, 5' m Longbottom 6' m Connor 9' c Con: Lucas (1/2) 3'; Porch (1/2) 9' | (Gold Coast 2018) | Try: Fomai 1' c Con: Mealoi (1/1) 1' |

Robina Stadium, Gold Coast
Referee: Sam Grove-White (Scotland)

14 April 2018
13:11

| Australia | 32–5 | Jamaica |
| Try: O'Donnell 1' m Longbottom (3) 2' m, 5' m, 14' m Porch 4' m Myers 11' c Con: Porch (0/4); Quinn (1/2) 11'; Cards: Killingworth (yellow card) 13' | (Gold Coast 2018) | Try: Bush 7' m Con: Stoppani (0/1); Cards: Beckett (yellow card) 11' to 13' |

Robina Stadium, Gold Coast
Referee: Craig Evans (Wales)

14 April 2018
20:05

| England | 26–17 | Australia |
| Try: Norton 3' m Davis (2) 7' c, 12' c McConnochie 8' c Con: Mitchell (2/3) 8', 12'; Bibby (1/1) 7'; Cards: Mitchell (yellow card) 4' to 6' | (Gold Coast 2018) | Try: Taylor 1' m Porch 5' c Connor 10' m Con: Lucas (1/2) 5'; Porch (0/1) |

Robina Stadium, Gold Coast
Referee: Richard Kelly (New Zealand)

5th-8th Playoff

15 April 2018
10:15

| Australia | 33–5 | Kenya |
| Try: O'Donnell (2) 4' c, 13' c Longbottom 7' m Myers 8' c Porch 10' c Con: Porch (4/5) 4', 8', 11', 14' | (Gold Coast 2018) | Try: Odhiambo 1' m Con: Agero (0/1) |

Robina Stadium, Gold Coast
Referee: Tevita Rokovereni (Fiji)

5th place match

15 April 2018
13:33

| Australia | 26–0 | Scotland |
| | (Gold Coast 2018) |

Robina Stadium, Gold Coast
Referee: Craig Evans (Wales)

=== Women's tournament ===
Roster

The following team was announced as the 2018 Commonwealth Games sevens team.

Head coach: Tim Walsh

| No. | Pos. | Player | Date of birth (age) | Union / Club |
|---|---|---|---|---|
| 1 | FW | Shannon Parry (co-c) | October 27, 1989 (aged 28) | Queensland |
| 2 | FW | Sharni Williams (co-c) | March 2, 1988 (aged 30) | Australian Capital Territory |
| 3 | BK | Demi Hayes | May 28, 1998 (aged 19) | Queensland |
| 4 | BK | Dominique du Toit | May 19, 1997 (aged 20) | Queensland |
| 5 | BK | Emma Tonegato | April 20, 1995 (aged 22) | New South Wales |
| 6 | FW | Vani Pelite | July 12, 1995 (aged 22) | Queensland |
| 7 | BK | Charlotte Caslick | March 9, 1995 (aged 23) | Queensland |
| 8 | FW | Cassie Staples | October 16, 1992 (aged 25) | New South Wales |
| 9 | FW | Emma Sykes | June 26, 1998 (aged 19) | Queensland |
| 10 | BK | Alicia Quirk | March 28, 1992 (aged 26) | New South Wales |
| 11 | BK | Emilee Cherry | November 2, 1992 (aged 25) | Queensland |
| 12 | BK | Ellia Green | February 20, 1993 (aged 25) | Victoria |
| 13 | | Georgie Friedrichs (reserve) | April 14, 1995 (aged 23) | Queensland |

Pool B

| Pos | Team | Pld | W | D | L | PF | PA | PD | Pts | Qualification |
|---|---|---|---|---|---|---|---|---|---|---|
| 1 | Australia | 3 | 3 | 0 | 0 | 80 | 27 | +53 | 9 | Semi-finals |
| 2 | England | 3 | 2 | 0 | 1 | 74 | 34 | +40 | 7 | Semi-finals |
| 3 | Fiji | 3 | 1 | 0 | 2 | 44 | 41 | +3 | 5 | Classification semi-finals |
| 4 | Wales | 3 | 0 | 0 | 3 | 12 | 108 | −96 | 3 | Classification semi-finals |

Source: GC2018
Rules for classification: 1) Points; 2) Head-to-head result; 3) Point difference; 4) Points scored.

13 April 2018
17:37

| Australia | 34–5 | Wales |
| Try: Tonegato 1' m Pelite 2' c Green (2) 6' m, 8' m Williams 7' m du Toit 12' c Con: Sykes (2/6) 3', 13' | (Gold Coast 2018) | Try: Joyce 10' m Con: Snowsill (0/1) |

Robina Stadium, Gold Coast
Referee: Rebecca Mahoney (New Zealand)

13 April 2018
20:17

| Australia | 29–12 | England |
| Try: Tonegato 2' m Green 7' c Sykes 8' m Pelite 12' c Staples 14' m Con: Sykes (2/5) 7', 12' | (Gold Coast 2018) | Try: Brown 4' m Fleming 6' c Con: Hunt (1/2) 6' |

Robina Stadium, Gold Coast
Referee: Alhambra Nievas (Spain)

13 April 2018
19:21

| Australia | 17–10 | Fiji |
| Try: Tonegato 1' m Caslick (2) 8' m, 13' c Con: Sykes (1/2) 13'; Cherry (0/1) | (Gold Coast 2018) | Try: Naiobasali (2) 2' m, 9' m Con: Tinai (0/1); Nagasau (0/1); Cards: Siata (yellow card) 11' to 13' |

Robina Stadium, Gold Coast
Referee: Sara Cox (England)

Semi-final match

| 15 April 2018 | Australia | 33–7 | Canada | Gold Coast |
| 10:59 |

Gold medal match

15 April 2018
14:39

| Australia | 12–17 | New Zealand |
| | (Gold Coast 2018) |

Robina Stadium, Gold Coast
Referee: Sara Cox (England)

== Shooting ==
Team of 28 athletes was announced on 31 January 2018.

Men
Pistol/Small bore

| Athlete | Event | Qualification | | Final | |
| Athlete | Event | Points | Rank | Points | Rank |
|---|---|---|---|---|---|
| Daniel Repacholi | 10 m air pistol | 566 -15x | 6 QF | 193.4 | 4 |
| Kerry Bell | 10 m air pistol | 564 -9x | 7 QF | 233.5 | 2nd place, silver medalist(s) |
| David Chapman | 25 m rapid fire pistol | 566-15x | 6 QF | 15 | 4 |
| Sergei Evglevski | 25 m rapid fire pistol | 576-11x | 3 QF | 30 | 2nd place, silver medalist(s) |
| Daniel Repacholi | 50 m pistol | 546 -7x | 3 QF | 227.2 GR | 1st place, gold medalist(s) |
| Bruce Quick | 50 m pistol | 528 -7x | 10 | Did not advance | |
| Alex Hoberg | 10 m air rifle | 615.3 | 7 QF | 204.6 | 4 |
| Dane Sampson | 10 m air rifle | 623.2 | 3 QF | 245.0 GR | 1st place, gold medalist(s) |
| James Daly | 50 m rifle prone | 620.5 | 1 QF | 163.2 | 6 |
| Dane Sampson | 50 m rifle prone | 608.8 | 12 | Did not advance | |
| William Godward | 50 m rifle 3 positions | 1135-28x | 12 | Did not advance | |
| Dane Sampson | 50 m rifle 3 positions | 1154-51x | 5 QF | 397.1 | 5 |

Full bore

| Athlete | Event | Stage 1 | | Stage 2 | | Stage 3 | | Total | |
| Athlete | Event | Points | Rank | Points | Rank | Points | Rank | Points | Rank |
|---|---|---|---|---|---|---|---|---|---|
| Jim Bailey | Individual | 105 – 15v | 1 | 150 – 22v | 1 | 148 – 13v | 5 | 403 – 50v | 2nd place, silver medalist(s) |
| Ben Emms | Individual | 105 – 13v | 5 | 147 – 16v | 16 | 147 – 19v | 7 | 399 – 48v | 9 |
| Jim Bailey; Ben Emms | Pairs | 299 - 35v | 3 | 281 – 19v | =7 | —N/a | | 580 – 54v | 6 |

Shotgun

| Athlete | Event | Qualification | | Final / BM | |
| Athlete | Event | Points | Rank | Points | Rank |
|---|---|---|---|---|---|
| Mitchell Illes | Trap | 119 | 2 QF | 22 | 5 |
| Thomas Grice | Trap | 112 | 15 | Did not advance | |
| James Willett | Double trap | 134 | QF | 23 | 6 |
| Paul Adams | Skeet | 118 | 7 | Did not advance | |
| James Bolding | Skeet | 117 | 9 | Did not advance | |

Women
Pistol/Small bore

| Athlete | Event | Qualification | | Final | |
| Athlete | Event | Points | Rank | Points | Rank |
|---|---|---|---|---|---|
| Elena Galiabovitch | 10 m air pistol | 376 -10x | 5 QF | 214.9 | 3rd place, bronze medalist(s) |
| Lalita Yauhleuskaya | 10 m air pistol | 371 -9x | 10 | Did not advance | |
| Elena Galiabovitch | 25 m pistol | 572-15x | 4 QF | 35 | 2nd place, silver medalist(s) |
| Lalita Yauhleuskaya | 25 m pistol | 571-21x | 5 QF | 7 | 8 |
| Emma Adams | 10 m air rifle | 399.1 | 16 | Did not advance | |
| Tori Rossiter | 10 m air rifle | 415.8 | QF | 140.2 | 7 |
| Robyn Ridley | 50 m rifle prone | —N/a | | 612.5 | 9 |
| Sussanah Smith | 50 m rifle prone | —N/a | | 606.7 | 13 |
| Emma Adams | 50 m rifle 3 positions | 566-18x | 14 | Did not advance | |
| Robyn Ridley | 50 m rifle 3 positions | 577-24x | 5 QF | 398.9 | 7 |

Shotgun

| Athlete | Event | Qualification | | Final / BM | |
| Athlete | Event | Points | Rank | Points | Rank |
|---|---|---|---|---|---|
| Laetisha Scanlan | Trap | 66 +8 | 7 Q | 38 GR | 1st place, gold medalist(s) |
| Catherine Skinner | Trap | 64 | 8 | Did not advance | |
| Emma Cox | Double trap | —N/a | | 96 +1 | 2nd place, silver medalist(s) |
| Gayle Shale | Double trap | —N/a | | 80 | 7 |
| Laura Coles | Skeet | 67 | 9 | Did not advance | |
| Aislin Jones | Skeet | 71 +1 | 3 QF | 13 | 6 |

== Squash ==
Team of 12 athletes was announced on 15 December 2017.

Singles

| Athlete | Event | Round of 64 | Round of 32 | Round of 16 | Quarterfinals | Semifinals | Final | |
| Athlete | Event | Opposition Score | Opposition Score | Opposition Score | Opposition Score | Opposition Score | Opposition Score | Rank |
|---|---|---|---|---|---|---|---|---|
| Ryan Cuskelly | Men's singles | Bye | Bailey (SVG); W 3–0 | Adnan (MAS); L WO | Did not advance | | | |
| Rex Hedrick | Men's singles | Ng (MAS); W 3–2 | Seth (GUY); W 3–0 | Clyne (SCO); L 0–3 | Did not advance | | | |
| Cameron Pilley | Men's singles | Bye | Jombla (SLE); W 3–0 | Walters (JAM); W 3–0 | Willstrop (ENG); L 2–3 | Did not advance | | |
| Christine Nunn | Women's singles | Bye | Kellis (MLT); W 3–0 | Urquhart (AUS); L 2–3 | Did not advance | | | |
| Tamika Saxby | Women's singles | Bye | Bridgeman (CAY); W 3–0 | Chinappa (IND); L 0–3 | Did not advance | | | |
| Donna Urquhart | Women's singles | Bye | Zafar (PAK); W 3–0 | Nunn (AUS); W 3–2 | Perry (ENG); L 1–3 | Did not advance | | |

Doubles

| Athlete | Event | Group stage | | | | Round of 16 | Quarterfinals | Semifinals | Final | |
| Athlete | Event | Opposition Score | Opposition Score | Opposition Score | Rank | Opposition Score | Opposition Score | Opposition Score | Opposition Score | Rank |
|---|---|---|---|---|---|---|---|---|---|---|
| Zac Alexander; David Palmer | Men's doubles | Frazer; Kelly (CAY); W 2–0 (11–6, 11–3) | Binnie; Walters (JAM); W 2–0 (11–7, 11–5) | —N/a | 1 Q | Creed; Makin (WAL); W 2–0 (11–1, 11–6) | Coll; Grayson (NZL); W 2–1 (11–9, 6–11, 11–7) | Clyne; Lobban (SCO); W 2–0 (11–8, 11–5) | Selby; Waller (ENG); W 2-1 (11-9, 3–11, 11–6) | 1st place, gold medalist(s) |
| Ryan Cuskelly; Cameron Pilley | Men's doubles | Pala; Parshottam (FIJ); W 2–0 (11–3, 11–0) | Patrick; Wilson (TTO); W 2–0 (11–0, 11–2) | —N/a | 1 Q | Khalil; Seth (GUY); W 2–0 (11–9, 11–7) | Selby; Waller (ENG); L 1–2 (11–9, 8–11, 10–11) | Did not advance | | |
| Sarah Cardwell; Christine Nunn | Women's doubles | King; Landers-Murphy (NZL); L 0–2 (8–11, 6–11) | Arnold; Subramaniam (MAS); L 1–2 (11–10, 6–11, 5–11) | —N/a | 3 | —N/a | Did not advance | | | |
| Rachael Grinham; Donna Urquhart | Women's doubles | Hennings; West (CAY); W 2–0 (11–2, 11–3) | Cornett; Todd (CAN); W 2–1 (5–11, 11–9, 11–4) | Fernandes; Fung-A-Fat (GUY); W 2–0 (11–2, 11–2) | 1 Q | —N/a | Evans; Saffery (WAL); W 2–1 (9–11, 11–10, 11–3) | King; Landers-Murphy (NZL); L 0–2 (9–11, 5–11) | Massaro; Perry (ENG); W 2-0 (11-6, 11–8) | 3rd place, bronze medalist(s) |
| Rachael Grinham; Ryan Cuskelly | Mixed doubles | Azman; Chal (MAS); W 2–0 (11–4, 11–4) | Knaggs; Wilson (TTO); W 2–0 (11–0, 11–4) | —N/a | 1 Q | Zafar; Zaman (PAK); W 2–0 (11–3, 11–1) | Urquhart; Pilley (AUS); L 0–2 (6–11, 9–11) | Did not advance | | |
| Donna Urquhart; Cameron Pilley | Mixed doubles | Fernandes; Seth (GUY); W 2–0 (11–4, 11–7) | Zafar; Zaman (PAK); W 2–0 (11–3, 11–6) | —N/a | 1 Q | West; Stafford (CAY); W 2–0 (11–7, 11–5) | Grinham; Cuskelly (AUS); W 2–0 (11–6, 11–9) | Waters; Selby (ENG); W 2–1 (10–11, 11–7, 11–7) | Pallikal Karthik; Ghosal (IND); W 2–0 (11–9, 11–10) | 1st place, gold medalist(s) |

== Swimming ==
After the 2018 Australian Championships and Commonwealth Games Trials, Swimming Australia announced a team of 70 athletes.

Men

| Athlete | Event | Heat | | Semifinal | | Final | |
| Athlete | Event | Time | Rank | Time | Rank | Time | Rank |
|---|---|---|---|---|---|---|---|
| James Roberts | 50 m freestyle | 22.11 | 4 Q | 22.11 | 6 Q | 22.15 | 7 |
| James Magnussen | 50 m freestyle | 22.23 | 6 Q | 22.20 | 8 Q | 22.05 | 6 |
| Cameron McEvoy | 50 m freestyle | 22.06 | 3 Q | 22.00 | 3 Q | 21.92 | 3rd place, bronze medalist(s) |
| Rohan Bright | 50 m freestyle S7 | 30.86 | 5 Q | —N/a | | 30.71 | 5 |
| Matthew Haanappel | 50 m freestyle S7 | 30.92 | 6 Q | —N/a | | 30.75 | 6 |
| Matt Levy | 50 m freestyle S7 | 28.68 | 1 Q | —N/a | | 28.60 | 1st place, gold medalist(s) |
| Jack Cartwright | 100 m freestyle | 48.85 | 2 Q | 48.73 | 5 Q | 48.62 | 6 |
| Kyle Chalmers | 100 m freestyle | 48.81 | 1 Q | 48.70 | 3 Q | 48.15 | 2nd place, silver medalist(s) |
| Cameron McEvoy | 100 m freestyle | 49.20 | 8 Q | 48.50 | 1 Q | 48.44 | 4 |
| Timothy Disken | 100 m freestyle S9 | 56.59 | 1 Q | —N/a | | 56.07 | 1st place, gold medalist(s) |
| Brenden Hall | 100 m freestyle S9 | 57.93 | 3 Q | —N/a | | 57.90 | 3rd place, bronze medalist(s) |
| Timothy Hodge | 100 m freestyle S9 | 58.76 | 4 Q | —N/a | | 58.11 | 4 |
| Kyle Chalmers | 200 m freestyle | 1:47.10 | 4 Q | —N/a | | 1:45.56 | 1st place, gold medalist(s) |
| Alexander Graham | 200 m freestyle | 1:47.35 | 5 Q | —N/a | | 1:47.01 | 6 |
| Mack Horton | 200 m freestyle | 1:47.89 | 7 Q | —N/a | | 1:45.89 | 2nd place, silver medalist(s) |
| Mitchell Kilduff | 200 m freestyle S14 | 2:01.02 | 3 Q | —N/a | | 1:59.55 | 4 |
| Daniel Fox | 200 m freestyle S14 | 2:00.40 | 1 Q | —N/a | | 1:58.26 | 3rd place, bronze medalist(s) |
| Liam Schluter | 200 m freestyle S14 | 2:00.44 | 2 Q | —N/a | | 1:56.23 | 2nd place, silver medalist(s) |
| Mack Horton | 400 m freestyle | 3:47.93 | 1 Q | —N/a | | 3:43.76 | 1st place, gold medalist(s) |
| David McKeon | 400 m freestyle | 3:48.86 | 4 Q | —N/a | | 3:49.60 | 6 |
| Jack McLoughlin | 400 m freestyle | 3:48.31 | 3 Q | —N/a | | 3:45.21 | 2nd place, silver medalist(s) |
| Mack Horton | 1500 m freestyle | —N/a | | | | 14:51.05 | 3rd place, bronze medalist(s) |
| Jack McLoughlin | 1500 m freestyle | —N/a | | | | 14:47.09 | 1st place, gold medalist(s) |
| Zac Incerti | 50 m backstroke | 25.05 | 1 Q | 25.19 | 3 Q | 25.06 | 3rd place, bronze medalist(s) |
| Mitch Larkin | 50 m backstroke | 25.32 | 2 Q | 24.91 | 1 Q | 24.68 | 1st place, gold medalist(s) |
| Ben Treffers | 50 m backstroke | 25.52 | 3 Q | 24.99 | 2 Q | 24.84 | 2nd place, silver medalist(s) |
| Mitch Larkin | 100 m backstroke | 54.02 | 1 Q | 53.15 | 1 Q | 53.18 | 1st place, gold medalist(s) |
| Ben Treffers | 100 m backstroke | 55.30 | 7 Q | 54.62 | 6 Q | 54.62 | 6 |
| Bradley Woodward | 100 m backstroke | 54.71 | 3 Q | 54.22 | 3 Q | 53.95 | 2nd place, silver medalist(s) |
| Brenden Hall | 100 m backstroke S9 | 1:06.10 | 3 Q | —N/a | | 1:04.73 | 1st place, gold medalist(s) |
| Timothy Hodge | 100 m backstroke S9 | 1:05.03 | 1 Q | —N/a | | 1:04.99 | 2nd place, silver medalist(s) |
| Logan Powell | 100 m backstroke S9 | 1:05.28 | 2 Q | —N/a | | 1:05.29 | 2nd place, silver medalist(s) |
| Josh Beaver | 200 m backstroke | 1:58.73 | 5 Q | —N/a | | 1:57.04 | 3rd place, bronze medalist(s) |
| Mitch Larkin | 200 m backstroke | 1:57.99 | 2 Q | —N/a | | 1:56.10 | 1st place, gold medalist(s) |
| Bradley Woodward | 200 m backstroke | 1:58.41 | 3 Q | —N/a | | 1:56.57 | 2nd place, silver medalist(s) |
| Jake Packard | 50 m breaststroke | 27.42 | 3 Q | 27.55 | 4 Q | 27.53 | 4 |
| James McKechnie | 50 m breaststroke | 27.53 | 4 Q | 27.67 | 6 Q | 27.59 | 5 |
| Liam Hunter | 50 m breaststroke | 28.10 | 9 Q | 28.05 | 10 | Did not advance | |
| Liam Hunter | 100 m breaststroke | 1:02.17 | 11 Q | 1:01.45 | 9 | Did not advance | |
| Jake Packard | 100 m breaststroke | 1:00.29 | 4 Q | 1:00.01 | 5 Q | 59.70 | 4 |
| Matthew Wilson | 100 m breaststroke | 1:00.29 | 4 Q | 59.89 | 4 Q | 1:00.48 | 7 |
| Blake Cochrane | 100 m breaststroke SB8 | 1:19.81 | 3 Q | —N/a | | 1:18.75 | 3rd place, bronze medalist(s) |
| Timothy Disken | 100 m breaststroke SB8 | 1:13.87 | 1 Q | —N/a | | 1:12.42 | 1st place, gold medalist(s) |
| Timothy Hodge | 100 m breaststroke SB8 | 1:17.02 | 2 Q | —N/a | | 1:15.80 | 2nd place, silver medalist(s) |
| George Harley | 200 m breaststroke | 2:11.62 | 7 Q | —N/a | | 2:10.04 | 5 |
| Zac Stubblety-Cook | 200 m breaststroke | 2:15.71 | 10 | —N/a | | Did not advance | |
| Matthew Wilson | 200 m breaststroke | 2:09.74 | 2 Q | —N/a | | 2:08.64 | 3rd place, bronze medalist(s) |
| Grant Irvine | 50 m butterfly | 23.95 | 4 Q | 23.79 | 2 Q | 23.76 | 4 |
| David Morgan | 50 m butterfly | 24.21 | 7 Q | 24.17 | 8 Q | 24.01 | 8 |
| Grant Irvine | 100 m butterfly | 53.89 | 8 Q | 51.87 | 1 Q | 51.50 | 3rd place, bronze medalist(s) |
| David Morgan | 100 m butterfly | 53.49 | 3 Q | 52.48 | 3 Q | 51.94 | 4 |
| Grant Irvine | 200 m butterfly | 1:57.91 | 5 Q | —N/a | | 1:56.91 | 4 |
| David Morgan | 200 m butterfly | 1:57.42 | 2 Q | —N/a | | 1:56.36 | 2nd place, silver medalist(s) |
| Mitch Larkin | 200 m individual medley | 1:59.02 | 1 Q | —N/a | | 1:57.67 GR | 1st place, gold medalist(s) |
| Travis Mahoney | 200 m individual medley | 2:02.30 | 12 | —N/a | | Did not advance | |
| Clyde Lewis | 200 m individual medley | 1:59.50 | 2 Q | —N/a | | 1:58.18 | 3rd place, bronze medalist(s) |
| Jesse Aungles | 200 m individual medley SM8 | 2:31.30 | 1 Q | —N/a | | 2:30.77 | 1st place, gold medalist(s) |
| Blake Cochrane | 200 m individual medley SM8 | 2:36.43 | 2 Q | —N/a | | 2:32.72 | 2nd place, silver medalist(s) |
| Rohan Bright | 200 m individual medley SM8 | 2:44.27 | 6 Q | —N/a | | 2:42.89 | 6 |
| Clyde Lewis | 400 m individual medley | 4:17.25 | 1 Q | —N/a | | 4:13.12 | 1st place, gold medalist(s) |
| Travis Mahoney | 400 m individual medley | 4:19.17 | 7 Q | —N/a | | 4:21.50 | 8 |
| Cameron McEvoy; James Magnussen; Jack Cartwright; Kyle Chalmers; James Roberts (Heat) | 4 × 100 m freestyle relay | 3:12.72 GR | 1 Q | —N/a | | 3:12.96 | 1st place, gold medalist(s) |
| Alexander Graham; Kyle Chalmers; Elijah Winnington; Mack Horton | 4 × 200 m freestyle relay | —N/a | | | | 7:05.97 GR | 1st place, gold medalist(s) |
| Mitch Larkin; Jake Packard; Grant Irvine; Kyle Chalmers; Bradley Woodward (heat); Matthew Wilson (heat); David Morgan (heat); Jack Cartwright (heat) | 4 × 100 m medley relay | 3:33.61 | 1 Q | —N/a | | 3:31.04 GR | 1st place, gold medalist(s) |

Women

| Athlete | Event | Heat | | Semifinal | | Final | |
| Athlete | Event | Time | Rank | Time | Rank | Time | Rank |
|---|---|---|---|---|---|---|---|
| Bronte Campbell | 50 m freestyle | 24.87 | 3 Q | 24.38 | 2 Q | 24.26 | 2nd place, silver medalist(s) |
| Cate Campbell | 50 m freestyle | 24.24 | 1 Q | 23.88 GR | 1 Q | 23.78 GR | 1st place, gold medalist(s) |
| Shayna Jack | 50 m freestyle | 24.50 | 2 Q | 24.63 | 3 Q | 24.57 | 4 |
| Lakeisha Patterson | 50 m freestyle S8 | 31.41 | 1 Q | —N/a | | 30.14 | 1st place, gold medalist(s) |
| Tiffany Thomas Kane | 50 m freestyle S8 | 35.21 | 4 Q | —N/a | | 35.40 | 4 |
| Bronte Campbell | 50 m freestyle | 24.87 | 3 Q | 24.38 | 2 Q | 24.26 | 2nd place, silver medalist(s) |
| Cate Campbell | 50 m freestyle | 24.24 | 1 Q | 23.88 GR | 1 Q | 23.78 GR | 1st place, gold medalist(s) |
| Shayna Jack | 50 m freestyle | 24.50 | 2 Q | 24.63 | 3 Q | 24.57 | 4 |
| Bronte Campbell | 100 m freestyle | 54.81 | 3 Q | 53.46 | 3 Q | 52.27 GR | 1st place, gold medalist(s) |
| Cate Campbell | 100 m freestyle | 54.05 | 1 Q | 52.64 GR | 1 Q | 52.69 | 2nd place, silver medalist(s) |
| Shayna Jack | 100 m freestyle | 55.00 0 | 6 Q | 53.58 | 4 Q | 53.83 | 6 |
| Ellie Cole | 100 m freestyle S9 | 1:03.98 | 1 Q | —N/a | | 1:03.36 | 3rd place, bronze medalist(s) |
| Emily Beecroft | 100 m freestyle S9 | 1:04.64 | 2 Q | —N/a | | 1:03.76 | 4 |
| Lakeisha Patterson | 100 m freestyle S9 | 1:05.66 | 3 Q | —N/a | | 1:03.02 WR-S8 | 1st place, gold medalist(s) |
| Emma McKeon | 200 m freestyle | 1:57.40 | 2 Q | —N/a | | 1:56.26 | 3rd place, bronze medalist(s) |
| Leah Neale | 200 m freestyle | 1:58.91 | 7 Q | —N/a | | 1:58.76 | 6 |
| Ariarne Titmus | 200 m freestyle | 1:57.02 | 1 Q | —N/a | | 1:54.85 | 2nd place, silver medalist(s) |
| Jessica Ashwood | 400 m freestyle | 4:13.12 | 7 Q | —N/a | | 4:10.32 | 5 |
| Mikkayla Sheridan | 400 m freestyle | 4:11.69 | 4 Q | —N/a | | 4:12.05 | 6 |
| Ariarne Titmus | 400 m freestyle | 4:10.22 | 1 Q | —N/a | | 4:00.93 GR | 1st place, gold medalist(s) |
| Jessica Ashwood | 800 m freestyle | 8:29.30 | 1 Q | —N/a | | 8:27.60 | 2nd place, silver medalist(s) |
| Kiah Melverton | 800 m freestyle | 8:42.01 | 6 Q | —N/a | | 8:28.59 | 3rd place, bronze medalist(s) |
| Ariarne Titmus | 800 m freestyle | 8:32.78 | 2 Q | —N/a | | 8:20.02 | 1st place, gold medalist(s) |
| Minna Atherton | 50 m backstroke | 28.50 | 7 Q | 28.47 | 9 | Did not advance | |
| Holly Barratt | 50 m backstroke | 28.49 | 5 Q | 28.12 | 4 Q | 27.96 | 4 |
| Emily Seebohm | 50 m backstroke | 27.63 | 1 Q | 27.89 | 2 Q | 27.78 | 1st place, gold medalist(s) |
| Hayley Baker | 100 m backstroke | 1:00.82 | 7 Q | 1:00.63 | 7 Q | 1:00.74 | 6 |
| Kaylee McKeown | 100 m backstroke | 1:00.65 | 5 Q | 1:00.11 | 4 Q | 1:00.08 | 4 |
| Emily Seebohm | 100 m backstroke | 58.91 | 2 Q | 58.95 | 2 Q | 58.66 | 2nd place, silver medalist(s) |
| Ellie Cole | 100 m backstroke S9 | 1:11.18 | 2 Q | —N/a | | 1:11.51 | 2nd place, silver medalist(s) |
| Ashleigh McConnell | 100 m backstroke S9 | 1:16.50 | 4 Q | —N/a | | 1:15.93 | 3rd place, bronze medalist(s) |
| Madeleine Scott | 100 m backstroke S9 | 1:16.87 | 6 Q | —N/a | | 1:16.12 | 4 |
| Hayley Baker | 200 m backstroke | 2:12.71 | 8 Q | —N/a | | 2:11.28 | 6 |
| Kaylee McKeown | 200 m backstroke | 2:10.45 | 3 Q | —N/a | | 2:07.86 | 4 |
| Emily Seebohm | 200 m backstroke | 2:11.68 | 5 Q | —N/a | | 2:06.82 | 3rd place, bronze medalist(s) |
| Georgia Bohl | 50 m breaststroke | 31.00 | 6 Q | 30.92 | 3 Q | 30.88 | 6 |
| Jessica Hansen | 50 m breaststroke | 30.93 | 4 Q | 30.92 | 3 Q | 30.83 | 5 |
| Leiston Pickett | 50 m breaststroke | 30.87 | 2 Q | 31.02 | 6 | 30.78 | 3rd place, bronze medalist(s) |
| Georgia Bohl | 100 m breaststroke | 1:07.40 | 1 Q | 1:07.13 | 2 Q | 1:07.22 | 3rd place, bronze medalist(s) |
| Jessica Hansen | 100 m breaststroke | 1:08.81 | 6 Q | 1:07.93 | 6 Q | 1:08.53 | 8 |
| Leiston Pickett | 100 m breaststroke | 1:07.72 | 3 Q | 1:07.71 | 5 Q | 1:08.04 | 6 |
| Paige Leonhardt | 100 m SB9 | 1:19.87 | 2 Q | —N/a | | 1:18.81 | 2nd place, silver medalist(s) |
| Madeleine Scott | 100 m SB9 | 1:21.31 | 3 Q | —N/a | | 1:19.98 | 3rd place, bronze medalist(s) |
| Jasmine Greenwood | 100 m SB9 | 1:26.61 | 6 Q | —N/a | | 1:25.23 | 5 |
| Georgia Bohl | 200 m breaststroke | 2:28.90 | 10 | —N/a | | Did not advance | |
| Taylor McKeown | 200 m breaststroke | 2:25.04 | 2 Q | —N/a | | 2:25.51 | 5 |
| Tessa Wallace | 200 m breaststroke | 2:26.86 | 6 Q | —N/a | | 2:26.59 | 6 |
| Holly Barratt | 50 m butterfly | 26.14 | 4 Q | 25.88 | 3 Q | 25.67 | 2nd place, silver medalist(s) |
| Cate Campbell | 50 m butterfly | 25.83 | 2 Q | 25.56 | 2 Q | 25.59 | 1st place, gold medalist(s) |
| Madeline Groves | 50 m butterfly | 25.81 | 1 Q | 25.54 | 1 Q | 25.69 | 3rd place, bronze medalist(s) |
| Tiffany Thomas Kane | 50 m butterfly S7 | 38.48 | 3 Q | —N/a | | 38.68 | 4 |
| Madeline Groves | 100 m butterfly | 57.77 | 1 Q | 57.22 GR | 1 Q | 57.19 | 2nd place, silver medalist(s) |
| Emma McKeon | 100 m butterfly | 58.04 | 2 Q | 57.94 | 3 Q | 56.78 GR | 1st place, gold medalist(s) |
| Brianna Throssell | 100 m butterfly | 58.96 | 6 Q | 58.38 | 7 Q | 57.30 | 3rd place, bronze medalist(s) |
| Emma McKeon | 200 m butterfly | 2:09.55 | 4 Q | —N/a | | 2:08.05 | 3rd place, bronze medalist(s) |
| Laura Taylor | 200 m butterfly | 2:08.43 | 2 Q | —N/a | | 2:07.39 | 2nd place, silver medalist(s) |
| Brianna Throssell | 200 m butterfly | 2:09.93 | 5 Q | —N/a | | 2:08.82 | 5 |
| Meg Bailey | 200 m individual medley | 2:13.61 | 7 Q | —N/a | | 2:14.58 | 8 |
| Blair Evans | 200 m individual medley | 2:13.63 | 8 Q | —N/a | | 2:12.76 | 5 |
| Taylor McKeown | 200 m individual medley | 2:15.77 | 10 | —N/a | | Did not advance | |
| Paige Leonhardt | 200 m individual medley SM10 | 2:34.29 | 3 Q | —N/a | | 2:32.68 | 4 |
| Katherine Downie | 200 m individual medley SM10 | 2:35.49 | 4 Q | —N/a | | 2:31.81 | 3rd place, bronze medalist(s) |
| Jasmine Greenwood | 200 m individual medley SM10 | 2:37.44 | 5 Q | —N/a | | 2:34.97 | 5 |
| Meg Bailey | 400 m individual medley | 4:41.51 | 3 Q | —N/a | | 4:41.46 | 7 |
| Blair Evans | 400 m individual medley | 4:41.54 | 4 Q | —N/a | | 4:38.23 | 3rd place, bronze medalist(s) |
| Kaylee McKeown | 400 m individual medley | 4:46.13 | 9 | —N/a | | Did not advance | |
| Bronte Campbell; Cate Campbell; Emma McKeon; Shayna Jack | 4 × 100 m freestyle relay | —N/a | | | | 3:30.05 WR | 1st place, gold medalist(s) |
| Emma McKeon; Brianna Throssell; Leah Neale; Ariarne Titmus | 4 × 200 m freestyle relay | —N/a | | | | 7:48.04 GR | 1st place, gold medalist(s) |
| Emily Seebohm; Georgia Bohl; Emma McKeon; Bronte Campbell | 4 × 100 m medley relay | —N/a | | | | 3:54.36 GR | 1st place, gold medalist(s) |

== Table tennis ==
Team of 12 athletes was announced on 29 January 2018.

Singles

| Athletes | Event | Group stage | | | | Round of 64 | Round of 32 | Round of 16 | Quarterfinal | Semifinal | Final / BM | |
| Athletes | Event | Opposition Score | Opposition Score | Opposition Score | Rank | Opposition Score | Opposition Score | Opposition Score | Opposition Score | Opposition Score | Opposition Score | Rank |
|---|---|---|---|---|---|---|---|---|---|---|---|---|
| David Powell | Men's singles | Bye | | | | Bye | Haiq (MAS); L 1–4 | Did not advance | | | | |
| Hu Heming | Men's singles | Bye | | | | Bye | Sam (GHA); W 4–0 | Kamal (IND); L 1–4 | Did not advance | | | |
| Xin Yan | Men's singles | Bye | | | | Bye | Leong (MAS); L 1–4 | Did not advance | | | | |
| Barak Mizrachi | Men's TT6–10 singles | Wilson (ENG); L 0–3 | Ogunsanya (NGR); W 3–0 | Cogill (RSA); L 0–3 | 3 | —N/a | | | | Did not advance | | |
| Tracy Feng | Women's singles | Bye | | | | —N/a | Thomas (WAL); W 4–0 | Bastra (IND); W 1–4 | Did not advance | | | |
| Jian Fang Lay | Women's singles | Bye | | | | —N/a | Tommy (VAN); W 4–0 | Ho (MAS); W 4–1 | Zhang (CAN); L 0–4 | Did not advance | | |
| Melissa Tapper | Women's singles | Bye | | | | —N/a | Lyne (MAS); W 4–1 | Feng (SIN); L 0–4 | Did not advance | | | |
| Andrea McDonnell | Women's TT6–10 singles | Obazuaye (NGR); L 0–3 | Chan (CAN); W 3–0 | Sutar (IND); W 3–0 | 2 Q | —N/a | | | | Tapper (AUS); L 1–3 | Pickard (ENG); W 3–0 | 3rd place, bronze medalist(s) |
| Melissa Tapper | Women's TT6–10 singles | Sarkar (IND); L 3–0 | Pickard (ENG); W 3–0 | Nime (PNG); W 3–0 | 1 Q | —N/a | | | | McDonnell (AUS); W 3–1 | Obazuaye (NGR); W 3–1 | 1st place, gold medalist(s) |

Doubles

| Athletes | Event | Round of 64 | Round of 32 | Round of 16 | Quarterfinal | Semifinal | Final / BM | |
| Athletes | Event | Opposition Score | Opposition Score | Opposition Score | Opposition Score | Opposition Score | Opposition Score | Rank |
|---|---|---|---|---|---|---|---|---|
| David Powell; Kane Townsend | Men's doubles | Bye | Pang; Poh (SIN); L 0–3 | Did not advance | | | | |
| Hu Heming; Xin Yan | Men's doubles | Bye | Dowell; Knight (BAR); W 3–0 | Dookram; Wilson (TTO); W 3–0 | Desai; Shetty (IND); L 1–3 | Did not advance | | |
| Michelle Bromley; Melissa Tapper | Women's doubles | —N/a | Bye | Chang; Tee (MAS); W 3–1 | Feng; Yu (SIN); L 0–3 | Did not advance | | |
| Jian Fang Lay; Miao Miao | Women's doubles | —N/a | Bye | Lin; Zhou (SIN); W 3–2 | Ho; Lyne (MAS); L 1–3 | Did not advance | | |
| Miao Miao; David Powell | Mixed doubles | Nambozo; Nyaika (UGA); W 3–0 | Zhang; Wang (CAN); L 1–3 | Did not advance | | | | |
| Melissa Tapper; Hu Heming | Mixed doubles | Bye | Shing; Lulu (VAN); W 3–0 | Xue; Zhou (SIN); L 2–3 | Did not advance | | | |
| Tracy Feng; Trent Carter | Mixed doubles | Bye | Franklin; Lowe (GUY); W 3–0 | Pirchford; Ho (ENG); L 1–3 | Did not advance | | | |
| Jian Fang Lay; Xin Yan | Mixed doubles | Bye | Sam; Baah-Danso (GHA); W 3–0 | Gao; Yu (SIN); L 2–3 | Did not advance | | | |

Team

| Athletes | Event | Group stage | | | Round of 16 | Quarterfinal | Semifinal | Final / BM | |
| Athletes | Event | Opposition Score | Opposition Score | Rank | Opposition Score | Opposition Score | Opposition Score | Opposition Score | Rank |
|---|---|---|---|---|---|---|---|---|---|
| Trent Carter; Hu Heming; David Powell; Kane Townsend; Xin Yan | Men's team | Kiribati; W 3–0 | Scotland; W 3–0 | 1 Q | Sri Lanka; W 3–0 | Nigeria; L 1–3 | Did not advance | | |
| Michelle Bromley; Tracy Feng; Jian Fang Lay; Miao Miao; Melissa Tapper | Women's team | Mauritius; W 3–0 | Canada; W 3–1 | 1 Q | —N/a | Wales; W 3–1 | Singapore; L 0–3 | England; L 1–3 | 4 |

== Triathlon ==
Team of six athletes announced on 17 November 2017. A further six paratriathletes announced on 25 February 2018.

Men

| Athlete | Event | Swim (750 m) | Trans 1 | Bike (20 km / 25 km paratriathlon) | Trans 2 | Run (5 km) | Total | Rank |
|---|---|---|---|---|---|---|---|---|
| Jake Birtwhistle | Men's | 9:10 | 0:32 | 27:53 | 0:27 | 14:36 | 52:38 | 2nd place, silver medalist(s) |
| Matt Hauser | Men's | 8:52 | 0:33 | 27:41 | 0:25 | 15:15 | 52:46 | 4 |
| Luke Willian | Men's | 9:05 | 0:34 | 27:56 | 0:28 | 15:30 | 53:33 | 8 |
| Bill Chaffey | Men's PTWC | 10:55 | 1:36 | 35:20 | 0:45 | 12:37 | 1:04:13 | 3rd place, bronze medalist(s) |
| Nic Beveridge | Men's PTWC | 11:10 | 1:44 | 35:40 | 1:05 | 13:49 | 1:03:28 | 2nd place, silver medalist(s) |
| Scott Crowley | Men's PTWC | 11:49 | 1:37 | 36:24 | 0:56 | 14:48 | 1:08:34 | 5 |

Women

| Athlete | Event | Swim (750 m) | Trans 1 | Bike (20 km / 25 km paratriathlon) | Trans 2 | Run (5 km) | Total | Rank |
|---|---|---|---|---|---|---|---|---|
| Gillian Backhouse | Women's | 9:34 | 0:36 | 30:25 | 0:27 | 17:52 | 58:54 | 9 |
| Ashleigh Gentle | Women's | 9:48 | 0:35 | 30:13 | 0:28 | 17:04 | 58:08 | 5 |
| Charlotte McShane | Women's | 9:47 | 0:36 | 30:13 | 0:26 | 18:18 | 59:20 | 11 |
| Emily Tapp | Women's PTWC | 14:10 | 2:08 | 41:14 | 0:49 | 14:35 | 1:12:56 | 2nd place, silver medalist(s) |
| Lauren Parker | Women's PTWC | 13:31 | 1:50 | 38:51 | 0:58 | 18:38 | 1:13:48 | 3rd place, bronze medalist(s) |
| Sara Tait | Women's PTWC | 17:51 | 1:37 | 45:22 | 1:15 | 17:27 | 1:23:32 | 6 |

Mixed

| Athletes | Event | Total Times per Athlete (Swim 250 m, Bike 7 km, Run 1.5 km) | Total Group Time | Rank |
|---|---|---|---|---|
| Gillian Backhouse; Matt Hauser; Ashleigh Gentle; Jake Birtwhistle | Mixed relay | 19:56; 18:15; 20:28; 18:57 | 1:17:36 | 1st place, gold medalist(s) |

== Weightlifting ==
Team of 16 athletes was announced on 23 January 2018. Five Paralympic powerlifters were added to the team on 7 March 2018. Simplice Ribouem withdrew prior to the competition due to injury.

Men

| Athlete | Event | Snatch | Clean & Jerk | Total | Rank |
|---|---|---|---|---|---|
| Phillip Liao | 56 kg | 91 | 114 | 205 | 7 |
| Vannara Be | 62 kg | 110 | 132 | 142 | 10 |
| Brandon Wakeling | 69 kg | 120 | 155 | 275 | 7 |
| François Etoundi | 77 kg | 136 | 169 | 305 | 3rd place, bronze medalist(s) |
| Boris Elesin | 85 kg | 140 | 161 | 301 | 9 |
| Ridge Barredo | 105 kg | 138 | 175 | 313 | 8 |
| Damon Kelly | +105 kg | 158 | 204 | 363 | 5 |

Women

| Athlete | Event | Snatch | Clean & Jerk | Total | Rank |
|---|---|---|---|---|---|
| Alyce Stephenson | 48 kg | 61 | 83 | 144 | 7 |
| Tegan Napper | 53 kg | 75 | 91 | 166 | 8 |
| Tia-Clair Toomey | 58 kg | 87 | 114 | 201 | 1st place, gold medalist(s) |
| Seen Lee | 63 kg | 105 | DNF | | |
| Philippa Malone | 69 kg | 95 | 114 | 209 | 5 |
| Stephanie Davies | 75 kg | 87 | 110 | 197 | 5 |
| Kaity Fassina | 90 kg | 104 | 128 | 232 | 2nd place, silver medalist(s) |
| Deborah Acason | +90 kg | 101 | 125 | 226 | 4 |

=== Powerlifting ===
Australia participated with 4 athletes (3 men and 1 women). Cristine Ashscroft was selected but withdrew prior to competition due to illness.

| Athlete | Event | Result | Rank |
|---|---|---|---|
| Nang Nguyen | Men's lightweight | 142.3 | 8 |
| Leigh Skinner | Men's heavyweight | 143.7 | 8 |
| Ben Wright | Men's heavyweight | 152.4 | 6 |
| Kelly Cartwright | Women's lightweight | 69.9 | 7 |

== Wrestling ==
Team of eight athletes was announced on 2 March 2018. Robert Whittaker withdrew from the Team on 16 March 2018.

Repechage Format

| Athlete | Event | Round of 16 | Quarterfinal | Semifinal | Repechage | Final / BM | |
| Athlete | Event | Opposition Result | Opposition Result | Opposition Result | Opposition Result | Opposition Result | Rank |
|---|---|---|---|---|---|---|---|
| Thomas Cicchini | Men's freestyle −57 kg | Bingham (NRU); W 9–6 | Aware (IND); L 0–10 | —N/a | Ramm (ENG); L 0–11 | Did not advance | |
| Mehrdad Tarash | Men's freestyle −65 kg | de Marinis (CAN); L 1–12 | Did not advance | | | | |
| Connor Evans | Men's freestyle −74 kg | Wrinkle (BAH); W 4–0 | Khullar (BAH); W 6–0 | Kumar (IND); L 0–4 | —N/a | Balfour (CAN); L 4–14 | 4 |
| Jayden Lawrence | Men's freestyle −86 kg | Inan (PAK); L 4–14 | —N/a | | Kadian (IND); L 0–7 | Did not advance | |
| Nicolaas Verreynne | Men's freestyle −97 kg | Hendry (SCO); W 5–0 | Erasmus (RSA); L 1–12 | Did not advance | | | |

Nordic Format

| Athlete | Event | Nordic Round Robin | | | | Rank |
| Athlete | Event | Opposition Result | Opposition Result | Opposition Result | Opposition Result | Rank |
|---|---|---|---|---|---|---|
| Rupinder Kaur Sandhu | Women's freestyle −50 kg | MacDonald (CAN); L 0–10 | Vinesh (IND); L 0–10 | Genesis (NGR); L 0–10 | —N/a | 4 |
| Carissa Holland | Women's freestyle −53 kg | Dilhani (SRI); L 2–10 | Weicker (CAN); L 0–10 | Samuel (NGR); L 0–10 | Kumari (IND); L 0–4 | 5 |
