= Athletics at the 2018 Commonwealth Games – Women's 100 metres (T35) =

Women's 100 metres (T35) at the 2018 Commonwealth Games
- Venue: Carrara Stadium
- Dates: 11 April
- Competitors: 7 from 4 nations
- Winning time: 13.58

Medalists
gold medal	Isis Holt	Australia
silver medal	Maria Lyle	Scotland
bronze medal	Brianna Coop	Australia

The women's 100 metres (T35) at the 2018 Commonwealth Games, as part of the athletics programme, took place in the Carrara Stadium on 11 April 2018. The event was open to para-sport athletes competing under the T35 classification.

== Records ==
Prior to this competition, the existing world record was as follows:

World record	Isis Holt (AUS)	13.37	Gold Coast, Australia	17 February 2018

== Schedule ==
The schedule was as follows:

Date	Time	Round
Wednesday 11 April 2018	21:22	Final

All times are Australian Eastern Standard Time (UTC+10)

== Results ==
With seven entrants, the event was held as a straight final.

=== Final ===
Rank	Lane	Name	Sport Class	Result	Notes
1st place, gold medalist(s)	6	Isis Holt (AUS)	T35	13.58	
2nd place, silver medalist(s)	2	Maria Lyle (SCO)	T35	15.14	
3rd place, bronze medalist(s)	3	Brianna Coop (AUS)	T35	15.63	
4	7	Carly Salmon (AUS)	T35	16.39	
5	8	Daphne Schrager (ENG)	T35	17.09	
6	5	Maria Verdeille (ENG)	T35	19.38	PB
7	4	Dephnny Naliupis (VAN)	T35	26.49	PB
				Wind: -0.6 m/s	
