= Athletics at the 2018 Commonwealth Games – Women's 1500 metres (T54) =

Athletics event

Women's 1500 metres (T54) at the 2018 Commonwealth Games
- Venue: Carrara Stadium
- Dates: 10 April
- Competitors: 8 from 5 nations
- Winning time: 3:34.06

Medalists
gold medal	Madison de Rozario	Australia
silver medal	Angie Ballard	Australia
bronze medal	Diane Roy	Canada

The women's 1500 metres (T54) at the 2018 Commonwealth Games, as part of the athletics programme, took place in the Carrara Stadium on 10 April 2018. The event was open to para-sport athletes competing under the T53 / T54 classifications.

== Records ==
Prior to this competition, the existing world and Games records were as follows:

World record	Tatyana McFadden (USA)	3:13.27 (T53/54)	Arbon, Switzerland	4 June 2015
Games record	Diane Roy (CAN)	3:52.83 (T54)	Glasgow, Scotland	29 July 2014

== Schedule ==
The schedule was as follows:

Date	Time	Round
Tuesday 10 April 2018	20:05	Final

All times are Australian Eastern Standard Time (UTC+10)

== Results ==
With eight entrants, the event was held as a straight final.

=== Final ===
Rank	Order	Name	Sport Class	Result	Notes
1st place, gold medalist(s)	6	Madison de Rozario (AUS)	T53	3:34.06	
2nd place, silver medalist(s)	1	Angie Ballard (AUS)	T53	3:36.85	
3rd place, bronze medalist(s)	3	Diane Roy (CAN)	T54	3:36.97	GR
4	7	Samantha Kinghorn (SCO)	T53	3:37.91	
5	4	Eliza Ault-Connell (AUS)	T54	3:38.88	
6	2	Nicole Emerson (ENG)	T53	3:51.28	SB
7	5	Marie Emmanuelle Anais Alphonse (MRI)	T54	3:51.99	
–	8	Jessica Frotten (CAN)	T53	DNF	
