= Carly Salmon =

Australian Paralympic athlete (born 1999)

Personal information
- Nationality: Australia
- Born: 9 July 1999 (age 27) Wagga Wagga, Australia
Medal record
Women's para athletics
Representing Australia
World Championships
Bronze medal – third place	2013 Lyon	200 m T35

Carly Salmon (born 9 July 1999) is an Australian Paralympic athlete who competes in long jump and the 100 metre and 200 metre sprints.

== Personal ==
Salmon was born 9 July 1999 in Wagga Wagga. A stroke at birth left her with cerebral palsy that restricts movement on the left side of her body. Salmon attended Mater Dei Catholic College, which is situated in her hometown of Wagga Wagga.

== Results ==
In 2013, Salmon was the youngest member of the Australian team when she competed in the IPC World Championships in Lyon, France where she won bronze in the 200 m T35 final. Salmon was also in the 100 metre final, where she finished 5th with an Oceania record-breaking time of 16.82. In March 2015, Salmon competed in the under-20's Women's 200 m at the Australian Junior Athletics Championships in March, where she came first with a time of 35.84.

At the 2015 IPC Athletics World Championships in Doha, she came fifth in her heat of the Women's 100 m T35 and did not start in the Women's 200 m. She nearly retired from para athletics after not being selected for 2016 Rio Paralympics.

At the 2017 World Para Athletics Championships in London, England, she finished sixth in the Women's 100m T35 and Women's 200m T35 events.

== Recognition ==
Due to her success at the IPC World Championships, The Daily Advertiser's Wagga Sports Awards named Salmon Junior Sportsperson for June, 2013. Salmon also received an athlete grant from the AIS in 2014/2015 for her podium finish.
