= Canada at the 2018 Commonwealth Games =

- Flag of Canada
- CG code: CAN
- CGA: Commonwealth Games Canada
- Website: commonwealthgames.ca

in Gold Coast, Australia 4 April 2018 – 15 April 2018
- Competitors: 282 in 17 sports
- Flag bearers: Meaghan Benfeito (opening ceremony); Erica Wiebe (closing ceremony)
- Medals Ranked 4th: Gold 15 Silver 40 Bronze 27 Total 82

Commonwealth Games appearances (overview)
- 1930; 1934; 1938; 1950; 1954; 1958; 1962; 1966; 1970; 1974; 1978; 1982; 1986; 1990; 1994; 1998; 2002; 2006; 2010; 2014; 2018; 2022; 2026; 2030

Other related appearances
- Newfoundland (1930, 1934)

Canada competed at the 2018 Commonwealth Games in Gold Coast, Australia from 4 April – 15 April 2018. It was Canada's 21st appearance at the Commonwealth Games, having competed at every Games since their inception in 1930.

On 6 October 2016, two time Commonwealth Games gold medallist Claire Carver-Dias was named as the chef de mission of the team.

For the first time ever, there has been entry quotas set for all sports and therefore each country is restricted in the number of athletes it could enter.

Canada's team consisted of 282 athletes competing in 17 sports. The team consisted of 137 male athletes and 146 female athletes. This included a record 21 para-sport athletes. Canada competed in all sports on the program except netball, which it failed to qualify in. Also, Canada did not qualify an athlete in the discipline of powerlifting.

On 28 February 2018, diver Meaghan Benfeito was named as the country's flag bearer at the opening ceremony.

The goal of the Canadian team was at least 100 medals to be won across all sports.

== Competitors ==
The following is the list of number of competitors participating at the Games per sport/discipline.

Sport	Men	Women	Total
Athletics (track and field)	25	20	45
Badminton	4	4	8
Basketball	12	12	24
Beach volleyball	2	2	4
Boxing	3	4	7
Cycling	9	9	18
Diving	6	6	12
Field hockey	18	18	36
Gymnastics	5	8	13
Lawn bowls	5	5	10
Rugby sevens	13	13	26
Shooting	3	1	4
Squash	0	2	2
Swimming	13	23	36
Table tennis	4	4	8
Triathlon	3	3	6
Weightlifting	5	6	11
Wrestling	6	6	12
Total	136	146	282

== Medallists ==
Medal	Name	Sport	Event	Date
Gold	Taylor Ruck	Swimming	Women's 200 m freestyle	5 April
Gold	Ellie Black; Jade Chrobok; Shallon Olsen; Isabela Onyshko; Brittany Rogers	Gymnastics	Women's artistic team all-around	6 April
Gold	Kylie Masse	Swimming	Women's 100 m backstroke	7 April
Gold	Ellie Black	Gymnastics	Women's artistic individual all-around	7 April
Gold	Maude Charron	Weightlifting	Women's 63 kg	7 April
Gold	Shallon Olsen	Gymnastics	Women's vault	8 April
Gold	Kylie Masse	Swimming	Women's 200 m backstroke	8 April
Gold	Alexandre Dupont	Athletics	Men's 1500 metres (T54)	10 April
Gold	Christabel Nettey	Athletics	Women's long jump	12 April
Gold	Melissa Humana-Paredes; Sarah Pavan	Beach volleyball	Women's tournament	12 April
Gold	Diana Weicker	Wrestling	Women's freestyle 53 kg	12 April
Gold	Erica Wiebe	Wrestling	Women's freestyle 76 kg	12 April
Gold	Sophie Crane	Gymnastics	Women's rhythmic individual clubs	13 April
Gold	Alysha Newman	Athletics	Women's pole vault	13 April
Gold	Jennifer Abel	Diving	Women's 3 metre springboard	14 April
Silver	Alexia Zevnik; Kayla Sanchez; Penny Oleksiak; Taylor Ruck	Swimming	Women's 4 × 100 m freestyle relay	5 April
Silver	Zachary Clay; Rene Cournoyer; Scott Morgan; Jackson Payne; Cory Paterson	Gymnastics	Men's artistic team all-around	5 April
Silver	Sarah Mehain	Swimming	Women's 50 metre butterfly S7	5 April
Silver	Tali Darsigny	Weightlifting	Women's 58 kg	6 April
Silver	Taylor Ruck; Kayla Sanchez; Rebecca Smith; Penny Oleksiak	Swimming	Women's 4 × 200 m freestyle relay	7 April
Silver	Taylor Ruck	Swimming	Women's 50 m freestyle	7 April
Silver	Aurelie Rivard	Swimming	Women's 200 metre individual medley SM10	7 April
Silver	Scott Morgan	Gymnastics	Men's floor exercise	8 April
Silver	Ellie Black	Gymnastics	Women's vault	8 April
Silver	Boadi Santavy	Weightlifting	Men's 94 kg	8 April
Silver	Mohammed Ahmed	Athletics	Men's 5000 metres	8 April
Silver	Brittany Rogers	Gymnastics	Women's uneven bars	8 April
Silver	Taylor Ruck	Swimming	Women's 200 m backstroke	8 April
Silver	Marie-Eve Beauchemin-Nadeau	Weightlifting	Women's 75 kg	8 April
Silver	Sarah Darcel	Swimming	Women's 200 metre individual medley	8 April
Silver	Kierra Smith	Swimming	Women's 100 m breaststroke	9 April
Silver	Cory Paterson	Gymnastics	Men's horizontal bar	9 April
Silver	Morgan Bird	Swimming	Women's 50 m freestyle S8	10 April
Silver	Kylie Masse	Swimming	Women's 50 m backstroke	10 April
Silver	Pierce LePage	Athletics	Men's decathlon	10 April
Silver	Taylor Ruck; Kylie Masse; Kierra Smith; Penny Oleksiak	Swimming	Women's 4 × 100 m medley relay	10 April
Silver	Meaghan Benfeito; Caeli McKay	Diving	Women's synchronised 10 metre platform	11 April
Silver	Sam Pedlow; Sam Schachter	Beach volleyball	Men's tournament	12 April
Silver	Steven Takahashi	Wrestling	Men's freestyle 57 kg	12 April
Silver	Philippe Gagné	Diving	Men's 3 metre springboard	12 April
Silver	Meaghan Benfeito	Diving	Women's 10 metre platform	12 April
Silver	Aaron Brown	Athletics	Men's 200 metres	12 April
Silver	Shawnacy Barber	Athletics	Men's pole vault	12 April
Silver	Katherine Uchida	Gymnastics	Women's rhythmic individual all-around	12 April
Silver	Nina Schultz	Athletics	Women's heptathlon	13 April
Silver	Mohammed Ahmed	Athletics	Men's 10,000 metres	13 April
Silver	Danielle Lappage	Wrestling	Women's freestyle 68 kg	13 April
Silver	Ryan Bester	Lawn bowls	Men's singles	13 April
Silver	Philippe Gagné; François Imbeau-Dulac	Diving	Men's synchronised 3 metre springboard	13 April
Silver	Thomas Blumenfeld	Boxing	Men's 64 kg	14 April
Silver	Grzegorz Sych	Shooting	Men's 50 metre rifle three positions	14 April
Silver	Michelle Fazzari	Wrestling	Women's freestyle 62 kg	14 April
Silver	Korey Jarvis	Wrestling	Men's freestyle 125 kg	14 April
Silver	Jessica MacDonald	Wrestling	Women's freestyle 50 kg	14 April
Silver	Canada men's basketball team: Justus Alleyn; Mambi Diawara; Ammanuel Diressa; Mamadou Gueye; David Kapinga; Conor Morgan; Jean-Victor Mukama; Erik Nissen; Jean Emmanuel Pierre-Charles; Grant Shephard; Mike Shoveller; Munis Tutu	Basketball	Men's tournament	15 April
Bronze	Allison Beveridge; Ariane Bonhomme; Annie Foreman-Mackey; Kinley Gibson; Stephanie Roorda	Cycling	Women's team pursuit	5 April
Bronze	Aidan Caves; Michael Foley; Derek Gee; Adam Jamieson; Jay Lamoureux	Cycling	Men's team pursuit	5 April
Bronze	Joanna Brown	Triathlon	Women's triathlon	5 April
Bronze	Rachel Leblanc-Bazinet	Weightlifting	Women's 53 kg	6 April
Bronze	Markus Thormeyer	Swimming	Men's 100 metre backstroke	6 April
Bronze	Taylor Ruck	Swimming	Women's 100 m backstroke	7 April
Bronze	Zachary Clay	Gymnastics	Men's pommel horse	8 April
Bronze	Scott Morgan	Gymnastics	Men's rings	8 April
Bronze	Philippe Vachon	Swimming	Men's 200 m individual medley SM8	8 April
Bronze	Erika Seltenreich-Hodgson	Swimming	Women's 200 metre individual medley	8 April
Bronze	Taylor Ruck	Swimming	Women's 100 m freestyle	9 April
Bronze	Tim Nedow	Athletics	Men's shot put	9 April
Bronze	Shallon Olsen	Gymnastics	Women's floor	9 April
Bronze	Diane Roy	Athletics	Women's 1500 metres (T54)	10 April
Bronze	Abigail Tripp	Swimming	Women's 50 m freestyle S8	10 April
Bronze	Django Lovett	Athletics	Men's high jump	11 April
Bronze	Marie-Jeanne Parent	Boxing	Women's 69 kg	11 April
Bronze	Haley Smith	Cycling	Women's cross-country	12 April
Bronze	Jevon Balfour	Wrestling	Men's freestyle 74 kg	12 April
Bronze	Brittany Crew	Athletics	Women's shot put	13 April
Bronze	Sabrina Aubin-Boucher	Boxing	Women's 57 kg	13 April
Bronze	Tammara Thibeault	Boxing	Women's 75 kg	13 April
Bronze	Eric Basran	Boxing	Men's 56 kg	13 April
Bronze	Harley O'Reilly	Boxing	Men's 81 kg	13 April
Bronze	Emily Schaefer	Wrestling	Women's freestyle 57 kg	13 April
Bronze	Jordan Steen	Wrestling	Men's freestyle 97 kg	13 April
Bronze	Vincent Riendeau	Diving	Men's 10 metre platform	14 April

Medals by sport
Sport	1st place, gold medalist(s)	2nd place, silver medalist(s)	3rd place, bronze medalist(s)	Total
Athletics	3	6	4	13
Basketball	0	1	0	1
Beach volleyball	1	1	0	2
Boxing	0	1	5	6
Cycling	0	0	3	3
Diving	1	4	1	6
Gymnastics	4	6	3	13
Lawn bowls	0	1	0	1
Shooting	0	1	0	0
Swimming	3	11	6	20
Triathlon	0	0	1	1
Weightlifting	1	3	1	5
Wrestling	2	5	3	10
Total	15	40	27	82

Medals by day
Day	1st place, gold medalist(s)	2nd place, silver medalist(s)	3rd place, bronze medalist(s)	Total
5 April	1	3	3	7
6 April	1	1	2	4
7 April	3	3	1	7
8 April	2	8	4	14
9 April	0	2	3	5
10 April	1	4	2	8
11 April	0	1	2	3
12 April	4	7	2	13
13 April	2	5	7	14
14 April	1	5	1	7
14 April	0	1	0	1
Total	15	40	27	82

== Athletics (track and field) ==
Canada's athletics team was given a quota of 45 athletes (36 able-bodied and 9 para athletes). However, this was later increased by one by Commonwealth Games Canada. The official team was later announced on 10 January 2018 and consisted of 26 men and 20 women. Potential medallist Andre De Grasse withdrew from the team in March 2018 and was replaced with Bismark Boateng. Brendon Rodney did not compete in any events.

Men
Track & road events

Athlete	Event	Heat		Semifinal		Final	
Athlete	Event	Result	Rank	Result	Rank	Result	Rank
Sam Effah	100 m	10.48	6	Did not advance			
Oluwasegun Makinde	100 m	10.59	4	Did not advance			
Gavin Smellie	100 m	10.45	1	10.32	5	Did not advance	
George Quarcoo; Adam Johnson (guide)	100 m (T12)	14.03	4	—N/a		Did not advance	
Kyle Whitehouse	100 m (T38)	—N/a				11.58	4
Aaron Brown	200 m	20.59	1 Q	20.18	1 Q	20.34	2nd place, silver medalist(s)
Bismark Boateng	200 m	20.80	3 q	21.06	7	Did not advance	
Alexandre Dupont	1500 m (T54)	3:07.30	4 q	3:11.75	—N/a		1st place, gold medalist(s)
Tristan Smyth	1500 m (T54)	3:12.20	3 Q	—N/a		3:14.88	7
Mohammed Ahmed	5000 m	—N/a				13:52.78	2nd place, silver medalist(s)
Mohammed Ahmed	10000 m	—N/a				27:20.56	2nd place, silver medalist(s)
Matthew Hughes	3000 m steeplechase	—N/a				8:12.33	4
Bismark Boateng; Sam Effah; Oluwasegun Makinde; Gavin Smellie	4 × 100 m relay	DSQ		—N/a		Did not advance	
Alexandre Dupont	Marathon (T54)	—N/a				1:36:44	5
Tristan Smyth	Marathon (T54)	—N/a				1:31:44	4
Evan Dunfee	20 km Walk	—N/a				1:23:26 SB	8
Benjamin Thorne	20 km Walk	—N/a				1:20:49 SB	4

Field events

Athlete	Event	Qualification		Final	
Athlete	Event	Distance	Rank	Distance	Rank
Django Lovett	High jump	2.21	=1 Q	2.30	3rd place, bronze medalist(s)
Michael Mason	High jump	2.21	7	2.24	=6
Shawnacy Barber	Pole vault	—N/a		5.65	2nd place, silver medalist(s)
Deryk Theodore	Pole vault	—N/a		5.35	6
Tim Nedow	Shot put	19.21	3 Q	20.91 SB	3rd place, bronze medalist(s)
David Bambrick	Shot put (F38)	—N/a		11.74	6
Kevin Strybosch	Shot put (F38)	—N/a		11.17	7
Adam Keenan	Hammer throw	—N/a		72.15	4

Combined events – Decathlon

Athlete	Event	100 m	LJ	SP	HJ	400 m	110H	DT	PV	JT	1500 m	Final	Rank
Pierce LePage	Result	10.62	7.44	13.98	2.07	47.81	14.71	43.90	4.90	58.24	4:58.00	8171	2nd place, silver medalist(s)
Pierce LePage	Points	947	920	727	868	918	885	744	880	711	571	8171	2nd place, silver medalist(s)
Taylor Stewart	Result	11.06	7.14	15.39	Did not finish							DNF	DNF
Taylor Stewart	Points	847	847	814	Did not finish							DNF	DNF
Damian Warner	Result	10.29	7.54	15.11	2.04	48.12	13.89	46.55	NM	Did not finish		DNF	DNF
Damian Warner	Points	1025	945	796	840	903	989	799	0	Did not finish		DNF	DNF

Women
Track & road events

Athlete	Event	Heat		Semifinal		Final	
Athlete	Event	Result	Rank	Result	Rank	Result	Rank
Crystal Emmanuel	200 m	22.72	1 Q	22.87	1 Q	22.70	5
Gabriela Stafford	1500 m	4:09.59	6	—N/a		Did not advance	
Jessica Frotten	1500 m (T54)	—N/a				Did not finish	
Diane Roy	1500 m (T54)	—N/a				3:36.97 GR	3rd place, bronze medalist(s)
Rachel Cliff	10000 m	—N/a				32:11.11	9
Natasha Wodak	10000 m	—N/a				31:50.18	5 SB
Sage Watson	400 m hurdles	55.43	3 Q	—N/a		55.55	5
Genevieve Lalonde	3000 m steeplechase	—N/a				9:46.68	7
Jessica Frotten	Marathon (T54)	—N/a				DNS	
Diane Roy	Marathon (T54)	—N/a				1:50:13	5

Field events

Athlete	Event	Qualification		Final	
Athlete	Event	Distance	Position	Distance	Position
Alyxandria Treasure	High jump	—N/a		1.91	4
Anicka Newell	Pole vault	—N/a		4.30	7
Alysha Newman	Pole vault	—N/a		4.75 NR	1st place, gold medalist(s)
Christabel Nettey	Long jump	6.79	2 Q	6.84	1st place, gold medalist(s)
Brittany Crew	Shot put	17.50	1 Q	18.32	3rd place, bronze medalist(s)
Taryn Suttie	Shot put	16.86	5 Q	16.92	8
Sultana Frizell	Hammer throw	—N/a		63.94	4
Jillian Weir	Hammer throw	—N/a		NM	
Elizabeth Gleadle	Javelin throw	—N/a		59.85	4

Combined events – Heptathlon

Athlete	Event	100H	HJ	SP	200 m	LJ	JT	800 m	Final	Rank
Niki Oudenaarden	Result	14.64	1.69	13.85	25.03	5.84	45.42	2:14.10	5878	6
Niki Oudenaarden	Points	890	842	784	884	801	772	905	5878	6
Nina Schultz	Result	13.47	1.84	12.13	25.02	6.19	43.11	2:17.40	6133	2nd place, silver medalist(s)
Nina Schultz	Points	1055	1029	670	885	908	727	859	6133	2nd place, silver medalist(s)
Angela Whyte	Result	13.35	1.72	11.48	25.36	6.07	44.58	2:18.79	5898	5
Angela Whyte	Points	1072	879	627	854	871	755	840	5898	5

== Badminton ==
Canada's badminton team consisted of eight athletes (four male and four female). The team was announced on 16 March 2018.

Singles

Athlete	Event	Round of 64	Round of 32	Round of 16	Quarterfinal	Semifinal	Final / BM	
Athlete	Event	Opposition Score	Opposition Score	Opposition Score	Opposition Score	Opposition Score	Opposition Score	Rank
Brian Yang	Men's singles	Cory Fanus (BAR); W 2–0 (21–9, 21–6)	Samuel Ricketts (JAM); W 2–0 (21–9, 21–13)	Loh Kean Yew (SGP); L 0–2 (21–16, 21–17)	Did not advance			
Jason Ho-Shue	Men's singles	Bye	Narayan Ramdhani (GUY); W 2–0 (21–7, 21–10)	Dennis Coke (JAM); W 2–0 (21–7, 21–10)	Rajiv Ouseph (ENG); L 0–2(21–14, 21–12)	Did not advance		
Brittney Tam	Women's singles	Bye	Nicki Chan-Lam (MRI); W 2–0 (21–14, 21–13)	Kate Foo Kune (MRI); W 2–1 (21–16, 16–21, 21–16)	P. V. Sindhu (IND); L 0–2 (21–14, 21–17)	Did not advance		
Michelle Li	Women's singles	Bye	Kimberley Clague (IOM); W 2–0 (21–7, 21–7)	Katherine Wynter (JAM); W 2–0 (21–10, 21–7)	Soniia Cheah (MAS); W 2–0 (21–12, 21–19)	P. V. Sindhu (IND); L 0–2 (21–18, 21–8)	Kirsty Gilmour (SCO); L 0–2 (21–11, 21–16)	4
Rachel Honderich	Women's singles	Bye	Allisen Camille (SEY); W w/o	Mahoor Shahzad (PAK); W 2–0 (21–17, 21–10)	Saina Nehwal (IND); L 0–2 (21–8, 21–13)	Did not advance		

Doubles

Athlete	Event	Round of 64	Round of 32	Round of 16	Quarterfinal	Semifinal	Final / BM	
Athlete	Event	Opposition Score	Opposition Score	Opposition Score	Opposition Score	Opposition Score	Opposition Score	Rank
Jason Ho-Shue; Nyl Yakura	Men's doubles	—N/a	Bye	Martin Campbell / Patrick MacHugh (SCO); W 2–0 (21–11, 21–17)	Sachin Dias / Buwaneka Goonethilleka (SRI); L 1–2 (21-19, 20–22, 17–21)	Did not advance		
Brian Yang; Ty Alexander Lindeman	Men's doubles	—N/a	Dennis Coke / Anthony McNee (JAM); W 2–0 (21–19, 21–10)	Marcus Ellis / Chris Langridge (ENG); L 0–2 (11–21, 9–21)	Did not advance			
Kristen Tsai; Rachel Honderich	Women's doubles	—N/a	Karyn Gibsoon / Andra Whiteside (FIJ); W 2–0 (21–4, 21–7)	Chow Mei Kuan / Vivian Hoo (MAS); L 0–2 (17–21, 16–21)	Did not advance			
Michelle Li; Brian Yang	Mixed doubles	Jordan Trebert / Elena Johnson (GUE); W 2–0 (21–11, 21–10)	Chris Adcock / Gabby Adcock (ENG); L 0–2 (10–21, 16–21)	Did not advance				
Kristen Tsai; Nyl Yakura	Mixed doubles	Bye	Cameron Coetzer / Michelle Butler-Emmett (RSA); W 2–0 (21–16, 21–15)	Satwiksairaj Rankireddy / Ashwini Ponnappa (IND); L 0–2 (10–21, 7–21)	Did not advance			
Brittney Tam; Ty Alexander Lindeman	Mixed doubles	Kervin Ghislain / Allisen Camille (SEY); W 2–0 (21–16, 21–10)	Kalombo Mulenga / Ogar Siamupangila (ZAM); W 2–0 (21–9, 21–13)	Sawan Serasinghe / Setyana Mapasa (AUS); L 0–2 (14–21, 18–21)	Did not advance			

Mixed team

Roster

- Jason Ho-Shue
- Rachel Honderich
- Michelle Li
- Ty Alexander Lindeman
- Brittney Tam
- Kristen Tsai
- Nyl Yakura
- Brian Yang

Pool D

Pos	Team	Pld	W	L	MF	MA	MD	GF	GA	GD	PF	PA	PD	Pts	Qualification
1	Malaysia	2	2	0	9	1	+8	19	2	+17	433	202	+231	2	Knockout stage
2	Canada	2	1	1	6	4	+2	12	9	+3	358	328	+30	1	Knockout stage
3	Ghana	2	0	2	0	10	−10	0	20	−20	159	420	−261	0	
4	Seychelles DSQ	0	0	0	0	0	0	0	0	0	0	0	0	0	

Updated to match(es) played on 6 April 2018. Source:

Canada
5
Carrara Sports and Leisure Centre, Gold Coast
5 April

Seychelles
0

			1	2	3
1	(Canada) (Seychelles)	Jason Ho-Shue; Kervin Ghislain	21; 7	21; 6
2	(Canada) (Seychelles)	Michelle Li; Allisen Camille	21; 3	21; 5
3	(Canada) (Seychelles)	Brian Yang / Ty Alexander Lindeman; Kervin Ghislain / Steve Malcouzane	21; 18	21; 9
4	(Canada) (Seychelles)	Brittney Tam / Rachel Honderich; Allisen Camille / Juliette Ah-Wan				w/o
5	(Canada) (Seychelles)	Nyl Yakura / Kristen Tsai; Steve Malcouzane / Juliette Ah-Wan				w/o

Canada
5
Carrara Sports and Leisure Centre, Gold Coast
6 April

Ghana
0

			1	2	3
1	(Canada) (Ghana)	Brian Yang; Emmanuel Donkor	21; 10	21; 10
2	(Canada) (Ghana)	Brittney Tam; Grace Atipaka	21; 7	21; 7
3	(Canada) (Ghana)	Jason Ho-Shue / Ty Alexander Lindeman; Emmanuel Donkor / Daniel Sam	21; 14	21; 15
4	(Canada) (Ghana)	Rachel Honderich / Kristen Tsai; Stella Koteikai Amasah / Gifty Mensah	21; 10	21; 8
5	(Canada) (Ghana)	Brian Yang / Michelle Li; Daniel Sam / Eyram Migbodzi	21; 11	21; 13

Malaysia
4
Carrara Sports and Leisure Centre, Gold Coast
6 April

Canada
1

			1	2	3
1	(Malaysia) (Canada)	Goh Soon Huat / Shevon Jemie Lai; Nyl Yakura / Kristen Tsai	21; 17	21; 12
2	(Malaysia) (Canada)	Lee Chong Wei; Jason Ho-Shue	21; 6	21; 5
3	(Malaysia) (Canada)	Soniia Cheah; Michelle Li	21; 14	19; 21	15; 21
4	(Malaysia) (Canada)	Goh V Shem / Tan Wee Kiong; Jason Ho-Shue / Nyl Yakura	21; 14	21; 13
5	(Malaysia) (Canada)	Vivian Hoo / Chow Mei Kuan; Rachel Honderich / Kristen Tsai	21; 16	21; 9

Quarterfinals

Canada
0
Carrara Sports and Leisure Centre, Gold Coast
7 April

England
3

			1	2	3
1	(Canada) (England)	Jason Ho-Shue / Nyl Yakura; Marcus Ellis / Chris Langridge	15; 21	18; 21
2	(Canada) (England)	Michelle Li; Chloe Birch	15; 21	21; 12	15; 21
3	(Canada) (England)	Brian Yang; Rajiv Ouseph	17; 21	14; 21
4	(Canada) (England)	Rachel Honderich / Kristen Tsai; Lauren Smith / Sarah Walker				not played
5	(Canada) (England)	Brian Yang / Michelle Li; Chris Adcock / Gabby Adcock				not played

Finished in an equal fifth position.

== Basketball ==
Canada qualified a men's and women's basketball teams for a total of 24 athletes (12 men and 12 women). Both teams qualified by being ranked in the top three in the Commonwealth. This will mark the country's debut in the sport at the Commonwealth Games. Canada did not compete in the sport at its only appearance in 2006 in Melbourne. Both of Canada's teams were announced on 20 March 2018 and are developmental teams consisting of young players.

=== Men's tournament ===
Roster

- Justus Alleyn
- Mambi Diawara
- Ammanuel Diressa
- Mamadou Gueye
- David Kapinga
- Conor Morgan
- Jean-Victor Mukama
- Erik Nissen
- Jean Emmanuel Pierre-Charles
- Grant Shephard
- Mike Shoveller
- Munis Tutu

Pool A

Team	Pld	W	L	PF	PA	PD	Pts	Qualification
Australia	3	3	0	271	183	+88	6	Semifinals
New Zealand	3	2	1	265	204	+61	5	Semifinals
Canada	3	1	2	197	244	−47	4	Qualifying finals
Nigeria	3	0	3	187	289	−102	3	Qualifying finals

6 April 2018
17:30

Boxscore

Australia	95–55	Canada
Scoring by quarter: 25–13, 22–16, 22–13, 26–13
Pts: Kickert 14; Rebs: Brandt, Sobey 11; Asts: Goulding 6		Pts: Diawara 10; Rebs: Morgan 6 Asts: Tutu 6

Cairns Convention Centre, Cairns
Referees: Bermudez (MEX), Gyoergyi (NOR),
Vincent (IND)

7 April 2018
14:00

Boxscore

Canada	82–67	Nigeria
Scoring by quarter: 23–16, 20–21, 14–15, 25–15
Pts: Diressa, Alleyn 24; Rebs: Tutu 6 Asts: Nissen 4		Pts: Diogu 29; Rebs: Diogu 15; Asts: Iroegbu, Diogu 3

Cairns Convention Centre, Cairns
Referees: Boyer (AUS), Kom Njilo (CMR),
Unsworth (GBR)

9 April 2018
18:30

Boxscore

Canada	60–82	New Zealand
Scoring by quarter: 14–20, 17–20, 12–23, 17–19
Pts: Kapinga 19; Rebs: Morgan 6 Asts: Diawara, Kapinga 2		Pts: Abercrombie 17; Rebs: Abercrombie 9 Asts: Ili 5

Cairns Convention Centre, Cairns
Referees: Bermudez (MEX), Boyer (AUS),
Decastro (MOZ)

Qualifying finals

10 April 2018
20:00

Boxscore

Canada	97–79	England
Scoring by quarter: 30–12, 25–14, 22–32, 20–21
Pts: Morgan 24; Rebs: Pierre-Charles 8 Asts: Tutu, Diressa 4		Pts: Thoseby, Josephs 20; Rebs: Gilchrist, Josephs 8 Asts: Thoseby 4

Cairns Convention Centre, Cairns
Referees: Liszka (POL), Boyer (AUS)
Dodds (GBR)

Semifinals

14 April 2018
12:30

Boxscore

New Zealand	86–88	Canada
Scoring by quarter: 16–22, 26–23, 16–30, 28–13
Pts: Ili 23; Rebs: Mika Vukona 15; Asts: Ili 7		Pts: Diressa 22; Rebs: Pierre-Charles 7 Asts: Tutu 6

Gold Coast Convention and Exhibition Centre, Gold Coast
Referees: Liszka (POL), Kato (JPN),
Kom Njilo (CMR)

Gold medal match

15 April 2018
11:30

Boxscore

Australia	87–47	Canada
Scoring by quarter: 20–10, 25–9, 18–10, 24–18
Pts: Goulding 11; Rebs: Sobey 8 Asts: Gliddon 5		Pts: Tutu 10; Rebs: Tutu 6 Asts: Morgan, Tutu 3

Gold Coast Convention and Exhibition Centre, Gold Coast
Referees: Omar Bermúdez (MEX), Wojciech Liszka (POL), Leonardo Zalazar (ARG)

=== Women's tournament ===
Roster

- Jacey Bailey
- Niyah Becker
- Danielle Boiago
- Shay Colley
- Paige Crozon
- Ruth Hamblin
- Alex Kiss-Rusk
- Summer Masikewich
- Ceejay Nofuente
- Daneesha Provo
- Merissah Russell
- Catherine Traer

Pool A

Pos	Team	Pld	W	L	PF	PA	PD	Pts	Qualification
1	Australia (H)	3	3	0	331	169	+162	6	Semi-finals
2	Canada	3	2	1	226	207	+19	5	Semi-finals
3	England	3	1	2	187	249	−62	4	Qualifying finals
4	Mozambique	3	0	3	157	276	−119	3	Qualifying finals

Source: GC2018
Rules for classification: 1) Points; 2) Head-to-head results; 3) Points difference; 4) Points scored.
(H) Hosts

6 April 2018
18:30

Boxscore

Canada	80–54	England
Scoring by quarter: 15–15, 26–17, 27–11, 12–11
Pts: Colley, Provo 14; Rebs: Kiss-Rusk 9 Asts: Nofuente 5		Pts: Jones 11; Rebs: Stewart 8 Asts: Jones 4

Townsville Entertainment and Convention Centre, Townsville
Referees: Snehal Bendke (IND), Jon Chapman (AUS), Sandy Ng (MAS)

8 April 2018
18:30

Boxscore

Australia	100–61	Canada
Scoring by quarter: 28–7, 22–13, 19–22, 31–19
Pts: Cambage 23; Rebs: George 8 Asts: Seekamp 4		Pts: Kiss-Rusk 15; Rebs: Kiss-Rusk 9 Asts: Boiago, Colley 4

Townsville Entertainment and Convention Centre, Townsville
Referees: Snehal Bendke (IND), Ryan Jones (NZL), Sandy Ng (MAS)

9 April 2018
20:00

Boxscore

Canada	85–53	Mozambique
Scoring by quarter: 28–11, 15–17, 28–13, 14–12
Pts: Hamblin, Provo 13; Rebs: Hamblin 10; Asts: Nofuente 6		Pts: Gimo 13; Rebs: Lhavanguane 9 Asts: Mucauro 4

Townsville Entertainment and Convention Centre, Townsville
Referees: Matthew Beattie (AUS), Matthew Bathurst (NZL), Snehal Bendke (IND)

Semifinal

13 April 2018
18:30

Boxscore

Canada	53–65	England
Scoring by quarter: 14–16, 5–19, 19–19, 15–11
Pts: Hamblin 21; Rebs: Hamblin, Kiss-Rusk 10; Asts: Kiss-Rusk 3		Pts: Vanderwal 20; Rebs: Stewart 12; Asts: Vanderwal 6

Gold Coast Convention and Exhibition Centre, Gold Coast
Referees: Takaki Kato (JPN), Joyce Muchenu (ZIM), Snehal Bendke (IND)

Bronze medal match

14 April 2018
18:00

Boxscore

New Zealand	74–58	Canada
Scoring by quarter: 16–12, 18–14, 23–13, 17–19
Pts: Leger-Walker, Taylor 18; Rebs: Purcell 7 Asts: Cocks 7		Pts: Nofuente 18; Rebs: three players 6 Asts: Masikewich, Traer 2

Gold Coast Convention and Exhibition Centre, Gold Coast
Referees: Jon Chapman (AUS), Sarah Carey (AUS), Kate Webb (ENG)

== Beach volleyball ==
Canada qualified a men's and women's beach volleyball team for a total of four athletes. The two pairs were announced in January 2018.

Athlete	Event	Preliminary round	Standing	Quarterfinals	Semifinals	Final / BM	
Athlete	Event	Opposition Score	Standing	Opposition Score	Opposition Score	Opposition Score	Rank
Sam Pedlow; Sam Schachter	Men's	Pool B Kamara – Lombi (SLE); W 2–0 (22–21, 21–14); Pradeep – Yapa (SRI); W 2–0 (21–11, 21–5); Miedzybrodzki – Cook (SCO); W 2–0 (21–12, 21–17)	1 Q	Apostolou – Chrysostomou (CYP); W 2–0 (21–17, 21–15)	O'Dea – O'Dea (NZL); W 2–0 (21–19, 21–15)	McHugh – Schumann (AUS); L (19–21, 21–18, 16–18)	2nd place, silver medalist(s)
Melissa Humana-Paredes; Sarah Pavan	Women's	Pool B Ratudina – Nima (FIJ); W 2–0 (21–5, 21–8); Blackman – Grant (TTO); W 2–0 (21–7, 20–8); Grimson – Palmer (ENG); W 2–0 (21–6, 21–6)	1 Q	Beattie – Coutts (SCO); W 2–0 (21–9, 21–9)	Konstantinou – Angelopoulou (CYP); W 2–0 (21–7, 21–12)	Artacho del Solar – Clancy (AUS); W 2–0 (21–19, 22–20)	1st place, gold medalist(s)

== Boxing ==
Canada's boxing team of seven athletes (three men and four women) was named on 12 December 2017. In February 2018, Mandy Bujold withdrew from the team and was replaced by Marie-Jeanne Parent.

Men

Athlete	Event	Round of 32	Round of 16	Quarterfinals	Semifinals	Final	Rank
Athlete	Event	Opposition Result	Opposition Result	Opposition Result	Opposition Result	Opposition Result	Rank
Eric Basran	−56 kg	—N/a	Betero Aaree (KIR); W 5–0	Zweli Dlamini (SWZ); W 5–0	Kurt Walker (NIR); L 2–3	Did not advance	3rd place, bronze medalist(s)
Thomas Blumenfeld	−64 kg	Bye	Robbie McKechnie (SCO); W 5–0	Nkumbu Silungwe (ZAM); W 5–0	Jesse Lartey (GHA); W 5–0	Jonas Jonas (NAM); L 0–5	2nd place, silver medalist(s)
Harley O'Reilly	−81 kg	—N/a	Louis Cedric Olivier (MRI); W 5–0	Ulrich Rodrigue Yombo (CMR); W WO	Ato Plodzicki-Faoagali (SAM); L 1–4	Did not advance	3rd place, bronze medalist(s)

Women

Athlete	Event	Round of 16	Quarterfinals	Semifinals	Final	Rank
Athlete	Event	Opposition Result	Opposition Result	Opposition Result	Opposition Result	Rank
Sabrina Aubin-Boucher	−57 kg	Bye	Vikki Glover (SCO); W 3–2	Skye Nicolson (AUS); L 1–4	Did not advance	3rd place, bronze medalist(s)
Caroline Veyre	−60 kg	Bye	Yetunde Odunuga (NGR); L RSC	Did not advance		
Marie-Jeanne Parent	−69 kg	Bye	Lorna Simbi (KEN); W 5–0	Sandy Ryan (ENG); L 1–4	Did not advance	3rd place, bronze medalist(s)
Tammara Thibeault	−75 kg	Bye	Clotilde Essiane (CMR); W 3–2	Lauren Price (WAL); L 0–5	Did not advance	3rd place, bronze medalist(s)

== Cycling ==
Canada's cycling team consisted of 18 cyclists, nine men and nine women. The team was officially named on 24 January 2018. On 16 February 2018, Tegan Cochrane withdrew from the team and was replaced with Lauriane Genest. All cyclists competing in the road events are also scheduled to compete in the track events.

=== Road ===
Men

Athlete	Event	Time	Rank
Aidan Caves	Road race	DNF	
Michael Foley	Road race	4:07:59	48
Derek Gee	Road race	DNF	
Adam Jamieson	Road race	DNF	
Jay Lamoureux	Road race	DNF	
Derek Gee	Time trial	53:11.86	18
Adam Jamieson	Time trial	59:40.95	43
Jay Lamoureux	Time trial	52:46.99	14

Women

Athlete	Event	Time	Rank
Allison Beveridge	Road race	3:10:59	29
Ariane Bonhomme	Road race	DNF	
Annie Foreman-Mackey	Road race	3:03:32	17
Kinley Gibson	Road race	DNF	
Stephanie Roorda	Road race	3:05:40	25
Ariane Bonhomme	Time trial	40:37.40	13
Annie Foreman-Mackey	Time trial	38:59.91	7
Stephanie Roorda	Time trial	41:08.33	14

=== Track ===
Sprint

Athlete	Event	Qualification		Round 1	Quarterfinals	Semifinals	Final	
Athlete	Event	Time	Rank	Opposition Time	Opposition Time	Opposition Time	Opposition Time	Rank
Hugo Barrette	Men's sprint	9.769	9 Q	Jacob Schmid (AUS); L	Did not advance			
Stefan Ritter	Men's sprint	9.803	11 Q	Lewis Oliva (WAL); L	Did not advance			
Patrice St-Louis Pivin	Men's sprint	10.246	19	Did not advance				
Hugo Barrette; Stefan Ritter; Patrice St-Louis Pivin	Men's team sprint	44.346	4 QB	—N/a			44.943	4
Lauriane Genest	Women's sprint	10.757	2 Q	Farina Mohd Adnan (MAS); W	Lauren Bate (ENG); W	Natasha Hansen (NZL); L	Kaarle McCulloch (AUS); L	4
Amelia Walsh	Women's sprint	11.229	12 Q	Olivia Podmore (NZL); L	Did not advance			
Lauriane Genest; Amelia Walsh	Women's team sprint	DQ		—N/a			Did not advance	

Keirin

Athlete	Event	Round 1	Repechage	Semifinals	Final (1–6)/(7–12)
Hugo Barrette	Men's keirin	6 R	1 Q	5	7
Stefan Ritter	Men's keirin	2 Q	Bye	4	11
Patrice St-Louis Pivin	Men's keirin	6 R	4	Did not advance	
Lauriane Genest	Women's keirin	2 Q	Bye	5	7
Amelia Walsh	Women's keirin	5 R'	3 Q	3 Q	5

Time trial

Athlete	Event	Time	Rank
Aidan Caves	Men's time trial	1:03.324	18
Stefan Ritter	Men's time trial	1:02.339	14
Lauriane Genest	Women's time trial	35.073	9
Amelia Walsh	Women's time trial	35.647	10

Pursuit

Athlete	Event	Qualification		Final	
Athlete	Event	Time	Rank	Opponent Results	Rank
Derek Gee	Men's pursuit	4:25.919	16	Did not advance	
Adam Jamieson	Men's pursuit	4:24.915	15	Did not advance	
Jay Lamoureux	Men's pursuit	4:30.200	18	Did not advance	
Aidan Caves; Michael Foley; Derek Gee; Adam Jamieson; Jay Lamoureux	Men's team pursuit	4:00.109	3 QB	4:00.440	3rd place, bronze medalist(s)
Ariane Bonhomme	Women's pursuit	3:38.604	16	Did not advance	
Annie Foreman-Mackey	Women's pursuit	3:33.975	7	Did not advance	
Kinley Gibson	Women's pursuit	3:36.582	11	Did not advance	
Allison Beveridge; Ariane Bonhomme; Annie Foreman-Mackey; Kinley Gibson; Stephanie Roorda	Women's team pursuit	4:22.484	3 QB	4:21.493	3rd place, bronze medalist(s)

Points race

Athlete	Event	Qualification		Final	
Athlete	Event	Points	Rank	Points	Rank
Michael Foley	Men's point race	5	11 Q	Did not finish	
Derek Gee	Men's point race	0	15	Did not advance	
Jay Lamoureux	Men's point race	22	3 Q	2	16
Allison Beveridge	Women's points race	—N/a		–19	22
Kinley Gibson	Women's points race	—N/a		5	8
Stephanie Roorda	Women's points race	—N/a		0	19

Scratch race

Athlete	Event	Qualification	Final
Aidan Caves	Men's scratch race	10 Q	Did not finish
Michael Foley	Men's scratch race	9 Q	Did not finish
Allison Beveridge	Women's scratch race	—N/a	7
Ariane Bonhomme	Women's scratch race	—N/a	18
Stephanie Roorda	Women's scratch race	—N/a	20

=== Mountain biking ===
Canada sent three mountain bikers (1 male and 2 female).

Athlete	Event	Time	Rank
Léandre Bouchard	Men's cross-country	1:19:15	6
Emily Batty	Women's cross-country	1:21:02	4
Haley Smith	Women's cross-country	1:20:26	3rd place, bronze medalist(s)

== Diving ==
Canada's diving team consisted of 12 (six per gender) athletes and was officially named on 1 March 2018.

Men

Athlete	Events	Semifinal		Final	
Athlete	Events	Points	Rank	Points	Rank
Philippe Gagné	3 m springboard	448.40	1 Q	452.70	2nd place, silver medalist(s)
François Imbeau-Dulac	3 m springboard	397.80	4 Q	401.55	7
Tyler Henschel	10 m platform	313.35	12 Q	320.85	12
Vincent Riendeau	10 m platform	371.15	8 Q	425.40	3rd place, bronze medalist(s)
Rylan Wiens	10 m platform	359.60	9 Q	370.30	8
François Imbeau-Dulac; Philippe Gagné	3 m synchronised springboard	—N/a		415.23	2nd place, silver medalist(s)
Bryden Hattie; Rylan Wiens	10 m synchronised platform	—N/a		369.21	6

Women

Athlete	Events	Semifinal		Final	
Athlete	Events	Points	Rank	Points	Rank
Jennifer Abel	3 m springboard	315.80	3 Q	366.95	1st place, gold medalist(s)
Meaghan Benfeito	10 m platform	314.75	6 Q	359.75	2nd place, silver medalist(s)
Caeli McKay	10 m platform	277.70	10 Q	325.90	6
Celina Toth	10 m platform	289.80	9 Q	300.85	9
Pamela Ware	3 m springboard	318.45	2 Q	330.60	4
Jennifer Abel; Melissa Citrini-Beaulieu	3 m synchronised springboard	—N/a		246.78	5
Meaghan Benfeito; Caeli McKay	10 m synchronised platform	—N/a		312.12	2nd place, silver medalist(s)

== Field hockey ==
Canada qualified both a men's and women's field hockey teams by being ranked in the top nine (excluding the host nation, Australia) among Commonwealth nations in the FIH Rankings as of 31 October 2017. Each team consisted of 18 athletes, for a total of 36.

=== Men's tournament ===
Roster

Canada's roster of 18 athletes was announced on 1 March 2018.

- Brenden Bissett
- David Carter
- Taylor Curran
- Adam Froese
- Richard Hildreth
- Gordon Johnston
- Antoni Kindler
- James Kirkpatrick
- Balraj Panesar
- Sukhi Panesar
- Mark Pearson
- Brandon Pereira
- Keegan Pereira
- Matthew Sarmento
- Iain Smythe
- John Smythe
- Scott Tupper
- Floris van Son

Pool A

Pos	Team	Pld	W	D	L	GF	GA	GD	Pts	Qualification
1	Australia (H)	4	4	0	0	16	2	+14	12	Advance to Semi-finals
2	New Zealand	4	3	0	1	18	6	+12	9	Advance to Semi-finals
3	Scotland	4	1	0	3	7	14	−7	3	5th–6th place match
4	Canada	4	1	0	3	3	12	−9	3	7th–8th place match
5	South Africa	4	1	0	3	4	14	−10	3	9th–10th place match

Source: FIH
Rules for classification: 1) points; 2) number of wins; 3) goal difference; 4) goals scored; 5) head-to-head results.
(H) Hosts

6 April 2018
11:30

New Zealand	6–2	Canada
Russell 28'; Woods 31'; Muir 41'; Lett 42'; Jenness 42'; Inglis 60'	Report	Kirkpatrick 47'; Johnston 58'

Umpires:
Hong Zhen Lim (SGP)
Paul Walker (GBR)

7 April 2018
11:30

Canada	1–0	Scotland
Sarmento 11'	Report

Umpires:
Deepak Joshi (IND)
Paul Walker (ENG)

10 April 2018
16:30

Australia	4–0	Canada
Wotherspoon 12', 14'; Hayward 15'; Mitton 54'	Report

Umpires:
David Sweetman (SCO)
Tim Bond (NZL)

11 April 2018
21:30

Canada	0–2	South Africa
	Report	Julius 31'; Rosenberg 60'

Umpires:
Jamie Hooper (WAL)
Tim Bond (NZL)

Seventh place match

13 April 2018
10:45

Canada	1–3	Pakistan
Kirkpatrick 12'	Report	Md. Arslan 34'; Ali 40'; Md. Irfan Jr. 57'

Umpires:
Eric Koh (MAS)
Tim Bond (NZ)

=== Women's tournament ===
Roster

Canada's roster of 18 athletes was announced on 16 March 2018.

- Rachel Donohoe
- Hannah Haughn
- Danielle Hennig
- Karli Johansen
- Shanlee Johnston
- Caashia Karringten
- Kathleen Leahy
- Alison Lee
- Lauren Logush
- Sara McManus
- Stephanie Norlander
- Madeline Secco
- Natalie Sourisseau
- Brienne Stairs
- Kaitlyn Williams
- Amanda Woodcroft
- Nicole Woodcroft
- Katherine Wright

Pool B

Pos	Team	Pld	W	D	L	GF	GA	GD	Pts	Qualification
1	Australia (H)	4	3	1	0	8	0	+8	10	Advance to Semi-finals
2	New Zealand	4	2	2	0	18	1	+17	8	Advance to Semi-finals
3	Canada	4	1	2	1	5	2	+3	5	5th–6th place match
4	Scotland	4	1	1	2	6	8	−2	4	7th–8th place match
5	Ghana	4	0	0	4	1	27	−26	0	9th–10th place match

Source: FIH
Rules for classification: 1) points; 2) number of wins; 3) goal difference; 4) goals scored; 5) head-to-head results.
(H) Hosts

5 April 2018
16:30

Australia	1–0	Canada
Kenny 25'	Report

Umpires:
Emma Shelbourn (GBR)
Wanri Venter (RSA)

6 April 2018
21:30

Canada	0–0	Scotland
	Report

Umpires:
Durga Devi (IND)
Jo Cumming (NZL)

8 April 2018
11:30

New Zealand	0–0	Canada
	Report

Umpires:
Wanri Venter (RSA)
Nur Hafiza Azman (MAS)

11 April 2018
11:30

Canada	5–1	Ghana
Stairs 12', 54'; Secco 29'; Hennig 34'; Wright 52'	Report	Amoako 33'

Umpires:
Aleisha Neumann (AUS)
Nur Hafizah Azman (MAS)

Fifth place match

13 April 2018
14:00

South Africa	1–3	Canada
Manuel 55'	Report	Johnston 10'; Secco 15'; Sourisseau 48'

Umpires:
Catherine Wright (WAL)
Cookie Tan (SGP)

== Gymnastics ==
Canada's gymnastics team consisted of 13 gymnasts (10 in artistic and 3 in rhythmic). The official team was announced on 22 February 2018.

=== Artistic ===
Men
Team & Individual Qualification

Athlete	Event	Apparatus						Total	Rank
Athlete	Event	F	PH	R	V	PB	HB	Total	Rank
Zachary Clay	Team	—N/a	14.200 Q	13.950	13.450	~~12.800~~	~~10.550~~	—N/a	
René Cournoyer	Team	13.600	12.650	14.200 Q	13.550 Q	14.250 Q	13.850 Q	82.100	4 Q
Scott Morgan	Team	14.450 Q	—N/a	14.200 Q	14.600 Q	—N/a	—N/a	—N/a	
Jackson Payne	Team	13.650	~~12.050~~	~~13.200~~	—N/a	13.950	13.250	—N/a	
Cory Paterson	Team	~~13.400~~	12.850	—N/a	~~12.150~~	14.000 Q	14.000 Q	—N/a	
Total	Team	41.700	39.700	42.350	41.600	42.200	41.100	248.650	2nd place, silver medalist(s)

Individual Finals

Athlete	Event	Apparatus						Total	Rank
Athlete	Event	F	PH	R	V	PB	HB	Total	Rank
Zachary Clay	Pommel horse	—N/a	14.300	—N/a				14.300	3rd place, bronze medalist(s)
René Cournoyer	All-around	12.950	12.750	14.000	14.300	13.300	13.500	80.800	7
René Cournoyer	Rings	—N/a		13.900	—N/a			13.900	4
René Cournoyer	Vault	—N/a			14.233	—N/a		14.233	4
René Cournoyer	Parallel bars	—N/a				14.300	—N/a	14.300	4
René Cournoyer	Horizontal bar	—N/a					12.666	12.666	6
Scott Morgan	Floor	13.833	—N/a					13.833	2nd place, silver medalist(s)
Scott Morgan	Rings	—N/a		14.000	—N/a			14.000	3rd place, bronze medalist(s)
Scott Morgan	Vault	—N/a			14.066	—N/a		14.066	5
Cory Paterson	Parallel bars	—N/a				14.000	—N/a	14.000	6
Cory Paterson	Horizonral bar	—N/a					14.000	14.000	= (silver)

Women
Team & Individual Qualification

Athlete	Event	Apparatus				Total	Rank
Athlete	Event	V	UB	BB	F	Total	Rank
Ellie Black	Team	14.300 Q	~~12.500~~	13.650 Q	13.450 Q	53.900	1 Q
Jade Chrobok	Team	—N/a	13.025	~~11.550~~	~~12.700~~	—N/a	
Shallon Olsen	Team	14.800 Q	—N/a	—N/a	13.250 Q	—N/a	
Isabela Onyshko	Team	~~13.350~~	13.700 Q	13.100 Q	12.800	52.950	4 Q
Brittany Rogers	Team	14.550	14.200 Q	12.250	—N/a	—N/a	
Total	Team	43.650	40.925	39.000	39.500	163.075	1st place, gold medalist(s)

Individual Finals

Athlete	Event	Apparatus				Total	Rank
Athlete	Event	V	UB	BB	F	Total	Rank
Ellie Black	All-around	14.400	13.500	12.850	13.450	54.200	1st place, gold medalist(s)
Ellie Black	Vault	14.233	—N/a			14.233	2nd place, silver medalist(s)
Ellie Black	Balance beam	—N/a		12.366	—N/a	12.366	6
Ellie Black	Floor	—N/a			13.200	13.200	4
Shallon Olsen	Vault	14.566	—N/a			14.566	1st place, gold medalist(s)
Shallon Olsen	Floor	—N/a			13.266	13.266	3rd place, bronze medalist(s)
Isabela Onyshko	All-around	13.350	13.300	12.550	12.700	51.900	8
Isabela Onyshko	Uneven bars	—N/a	13.200	—N/a		13.200	5
Isabela Onyshko	Balance beam	—N/a		12.533	—N/a	12.533	4
Brittany Rogers	Uneven bars	—N/a	14.200	—N/a		14.200	2nd place, silver medalist(s)

=== Rhythmic ===
Team & Individual Qualification

Athlete	Event	Apparatus				Total	Rank
Athlete	Event	Hoop	Ball	Clubs	Ribbon	Total	Rank
Sophie Crane	Team	13.800 Q	9.900	12.900 Q	10.600	47.200	9 Q
Katherine Uchida	Team	13.200 Q	11.050	11.950 Q	10.600 R	46.800	12 Q
Carmen Whelan	Team	11.350	11.500	11.375	11.125 Q	45.350	13
Total	Team	38.350	22.550	36.225	21.725	118.850	4

Individual Finals

Athlete	Event	Apparatus				Total	Rank
Athlete	Event	Hoop	Ball	Clubs	Ribbon	Total	Rank
Sophie Crane	All-around	12.150	12.450	14.175	9.200	47.975	9
Sophie Crane	Hoops	11.375	—N/a			11.375	7
Sophie Crane	Clubs	—N/a		13.950	—N/a	13.950	1st place, gold medalist(s)
Katherine Uchida	All-around	14.000	13.250	14.300	11.100	52.650	2nd place, silver medalist(s)
Katherine Uchida	Clubs	—N/a		13.100	—N/a	13.100	5
Katherine Uchida	Hoops	13.100	—N/a			13.100	5
Katherine Uchida	Ribbon	—N/a			9.450	9.450	8

== Lawn bowls ==
Bowls Canada announced a squad of ten athletes (five per gender) on 20 November 2017.

Men

Athlete	Event	Group Stage						Quarterfinal	Semifinal	Final / BM	
Athlete	Event	Opposition Score	Opposition Score	Opposition Score	Opposition Score	Opposition Score	Rank	Opposition Score	Opposition Score	Opposition Score	Rank
Ryan Bester	Singles	McGreal (IOM); W 21–8	Gaborutwe (BOT); W 21–4	Bazo (PNG); W 21–13	de Sousa (GUE); W 21–20	Kelly (NIR); W 21–12	1 Q	Breitenbach (RSA); W 21–9	Burnett (SCO); W 21–19	Wilson (AUS); L 14–21	2nd place, silver medalist(s)
Ryan Bester; Ryan Stadnyk	Pairs	Brunei; W 15–11	Guernsey; W 16–14	Malta; L 12–26	Australia; L 12–15	—N/a	3	Did not advance			
Cam Lefresne; Chris Stadnyk; Greg Wilson	Triples	Namibia; L 11–16	Singapore; W 13–12	New Zealand; L 13–18	Niue; W 23–7	—N/a	2 Q	Jersey; W 17–7	Australia; L 5–20	Norfolk Island; L 16–19	4
Cam Lefresne; Chris Stadnyk; Ryan Stadnyk; Greg Wilson	Fours	Wales; L 10–23	Cook Islands; W 21–12	New Zealand; L 11–21	Papua New Guinea; W 19–17	—N/a	3	Did not advance			

Women

Athlete	Event	Group Stage						Quarterfinal	Semifinal	Final / BM	
Athlete	Event	Opposition Score	Opposition Score	Opposition Score	Opposition Score	Opposition Score	Rank	Opposition Score	Opposition Score	Opposition Score	Rank
Kelly McKerihen	Singles	Senna (BOT); W 21–9	Wimp (PNG); W 21–14	Mataio (COK); W 21–7	Mbugua (KEN); W 21–10	Anderson (NFI); L 19–21	2 Q	Brown (SCO); W 21–12	Daniels (WAL); L 13–21	Piketh (RSA); L 17–21	4
Kelly McKerihen; Leanne Chinery	Pairs	Fiji; W 30–7	Norfolk Island; L 12–14	New Zealand; W 18–16	Tonga; W 20–12	—N/a	1 Q	Norfolk Island; W 21–6	Malaysia; L 8–15	Scotland; L 10–18	4
Jacqueline Foster; Pricilla Westlake; Joanna Cooper	Triples	Fiji; W 19–15	Papua New Guinea; L 11–14	Australia; L 13–20	India; W 19–10	—N/a	2 Q	New Zealand; W 18–16	Scotland; L 7–19	England; L 12–20	4
Jacqueline Foster; Pricilla Westlake; Joanna Cooper; Leanne Chinery	Fours	Wales; W 25–11	Scotland; L 7–21	Niue; W 20–9	—N/a		2 Q	Scotland; W 24–11	Australia; L 9–10	Malta; L 8–17	4

== Rugby sevens ==
=== Men's tournament ===
Canada qualified a men's team of 12 athletes by being among the top nine ranked nations from the Commonwealth in the 2016–17 World Rugby Sevens Series ranking.

Roster

- Connor Braid
- Admir Cejvanovic
- Andrew Coe
- Justin Douglas
- Mike Fuailefau
- Lucas Hammond
- Nathan Hirayama
- Harry Jones
- Isaac Kaay
- Pat Kay
- John Moonlight
- Matt Mullins
- Tevaughn Campbell (reserve)

Pool C

Pos	Team	Pld	W	D	L	PF	PA	PD	Pts	Qualification
1	New Zealand	3	3	0	0	127	14	+113	9	Semi-finals
2	Kenya	3	2	0	1	80	50	+30	7	Classification semi-finals
3	Canada	3	1	0	2	64	59	+5	5	
4	Zambia	3	0	0	3	0	148	−148	3	

Source: GC2018
Rules for classification: 1) Points; 2) Head-to-head result; 3) Point difference; 4) Points scored.

14 April 2018
10:15

Canada	10–26	Kenya
Try: Hirayama 1' m Douglas 10' m Con: Hirayama (0/2)	(Gold Coast 2018)	Try: Injera 7' m Oluoch 8' c Oyoo 12' c Ambaka 13' c Con: Oliech (3/4) 8', 12', 13'; Cards: Ouma Achieng (yellow card) 5' to 7'

Robina Stadium, Gold Coast
Referee: Richard Kelly (New Zealand)

14 April 2018
13:55

Canada	47–0	Zambia
Try: Hirayama 1' m Fuailefau (3) 2' c, 8' c, 11' c Douglas 4' c Coe 6' c Hammond 7' c Con: Hirayama (6/7) 3', 4', 6', 7', 8', 12'	(Gold Coast 2018)	Cards: Sheleni (yellow card) 8' to 10'

Robina Stadium, Gold Coast
Referee: Jordan Way (Australia)

14 April 2018
20:49

New Zealand	33–7	Canada
Try: Curry 1' m Ware (2) 3' c, 8' c Koroi 5' c Baker 11' c Con: Knewstubb (3/4) 3', 5', 8'; Baker (1/1) 11'	(Gold Coast 2018)	Try: Cejvanovic 13' c Con: Hirayama (1/1) 14'; Cards: Jones (yellow card) 2' to 5'

Robina Stadium, Gold Coast
Referee: Craig Evans (Wales)

=== Women's tournament ===
Canada's women's team qualified as being one of the top four eligible teams from the 2016–17 World Rugby Women's Sevens Series.

Roster

Canada's 13 member roster was officially confirmed on 2 April 2018.

- Brittany Benn
- Caroline Crossley
- Hannah Darling
- Bianca Farella
- Julia Greenshields
- Sara Kaljuvee
- Ghislaine Landry
- Megan Lukan
- Kayla Moleschi
- Breanne Nicholas
- Natasha Watcham-Roy
- Charity Williams
- Olivia Apps (reserve)

Pool A

Pos	Team	Pld	W	D	L	PF	PA	PD	Pts	Qualification
1	New Zealand	3	3	0	0	110	7	+103	9	Semi-finals
2	Canada	3	2	0	1	60	36	+24	7	Semi-finals
3	Kenya	3	1	0	2	31	79	−48	5	Classification semi-finals
4	South Africa	3	0	0	3	10	89	−79	3	Classification semi-finals

Source: GC2018
Rules for classification: 1) Points; 2) Head-to-head result; 3) Point difference; 4) Points scored.

13 April 2018
16:31

Canada	29–0	South Africa
Try: Crossley 1' m Benn 2' c Kaljuvee 4' c Williams 6' m Darling 8' m Con: Landry (2/4) 3', 4'; Lukan (0/1)	(Gold Coast 2018)

Robina Stadium, Gold Coast
Referee: Hollie Davidson (Scotland)

13 April 2018
19:11

Canada	24–12	Kenya
Try: Greenshields 1' m Darling 3' m Farella (2) 6' c, 8' c Con: Nicholas (2/4) 6', 8'	(Gold Goast 2018)	Try: Olando 5' c Okelo 12'; Con: Remour Nziwa (1/1) 5'

Robina Stadium, Gold Coast
Referee: Hollie Davidson (Scotland)

14 April 2018
12:49

New Zealand	24–7	Canada
Try: Woodman 2' m Blyde (2) 9' m, 12' c Waaka 14' c Con: Nathan-Wong (2/4) 12', 14'; Cards: Goss (yellow card) 6' to 8'; Blyde (yellow card) 7' to 9'	(Gold Coast 2018)	Try: Greenshields 7' c Con: Landry (1/1) 7'

Robina Stadium, Gold Coast
Referee: Alhambra Nievas (Spain)

Semi-finals

15 April 2018	Australia	33–7	Canada	Gold Coast
10:59

Bronze medal match

15 April 2018	Canada	19–24	England	Gold Coast
13:55

== Shooting ==
Canada's shooting team consisted of four athletes (three male and one female).

Men

Athlete	Event	Qualification		Final	
Athlete	Event	Points	Rank	Points	Rank
Grzegorz Sych	50 metre rifle 3 positions	1145	7 Q	448.4	2nd place, silver medalist(s)
Grzegorz Sych	50 metre rifle prone	608.0	13	Did not advance	
Curtis Wennberg	Trap	115	13	Did not advance	

Open

Athlete	Event	Day 1		Day 2		Day 3		Total	
Athlete	Event	Points	Rank	Points	Rank	Points	Rank	Overall	Rank
Robert Pitcairn	Queen's prize individual	103–11v	16	142-10v	28	146-10v	18	391-31v	21
Nicole Rossignol	Queen's prize individual	105–9v	9	148-18v	11	147-11v	12	400-38v	7
Robert Pitcairn; Nicole Rossignol	Queen's prize pairs	295–33v	9	284–14v	5	—N/a		579–47v	8

== Squash ==
Canada's squash team of two athletes was named on 30 January 2018.

Individual

Athlete	Event	Round of 64	Round of 32	Round of 16	Quarterfinals	Semifinals	Final	
Athlete	Event	Opposition Score	Opposition Score	Opposition Score	Opposition Score	Opposition Score	Opposition Score	Rank
Samantha Cornett	Women's singles	Bye	Fung-A-Fat (GUY); W 3–0 (11–5, 11–2, 11–4)	David (MAS); L 1–3 (8-20, 11–8, 7–11, 3–11)	Did not advance			
Nikki Todd	Women's singles	Bye	Mulwa (KEN); W 3–0 (11–4, 11–8, 11–7)	Perry (ENG); L 0–3 (10-12, 3–11, 5–11)	Did not advance			

Doubles

Athlete	Event	Group stage				Quarterfinals	Semifinals	Final	
Athlete	Event	Opposition Score	Opposition Score	Opposition Score	Rank	Opposition Score	Opposition Score	Opposition Score	Rank
Samantha Cornett; Nikki Todd	Women's doubles	Fernandes / Fung A-Fat (GUY); W 2–0 (11–4, 11–1)	Grinham / Urquhart (AUS); L 1–2 (11–5, 9–11, 4–11)	Hennings / West (CAY); W 2–0 (11–6, 11–5)	2 Q	Chinappa / Pallikal Karthik (IND); L 1–2 (11–7, 5–11, 9–11)	Did not advance		

== Swimming ==
Canada's swimming team was scheduled to consist of 44 swimmers (30 able bodied and 14 para-swimmers). On 26 September 2017 the able bodied team of 26 swimmers (10 male and 16 female) was announced. A team of 11 para swimmers (3 men and 8 women) was announced on 18 January 2018. So the team size was 37 swimmers.

Men

Athlete	Event	Heat		Semifinal		Final	
Athlete	Event	Time	Rank	Time	Rank	Time	Rank
Ruslan Gaziev	50 m freestyle	22.80	15 Q	22.80	14	Did not advance	
Yuri Kisil	50 m freestyle	22.40	9 Q	22.09	4 Q	22.03	5
Ruslan Gaziev	100 m freestyle	50.04	19	Did not advance			
Yuri Kisil	100 m freestyle	49.06	5	48.79	6 Q	48.80	7
Markus Thormeyer	100 m freestyle	49.41	9	49.22	9	Did not advance	
Jeremy Bagshaw	200 m freestyle	1:49.60	17	—N/a		Did not advance	
Samuel Belanger	200 m freestyle	1:51.69	19	—N/a		Did not advance	
Carson Olafson	200 m freestyle	1:49.14	14	—N/a		Did not advance	
Jeremy Bagshaw	400 m freestyle	3:50.76	6 Q	—N/a		3:49.52	5
Markus Thormeyer	100 m backstroke	55.26	6 Q	53.86	2 Q	54.14	3rd place, bronze medalist(s)
Josiah Binnema	200 m backstroke	2:02.06	12	—N/a		Did not advance	
Markus Thormeyer	200 m backstroke	1:59.68	6 Q	—N/a		1:57.82	5
Elijah Wall	50 m breaststroke	28.29	12 Q	28.52	12	Did not advance	
Elijah Wall	100 m breaststroke	1:01.77	10 Q	1:01.47	10	Did not advance	
Elijah Wall	200 m breaststroke	2:11.47	6 Q	—N/a		2:11.94	8
Josiah Binnema	50 m butterfly	24.57	14 Q	24.30	9	Did not advance	
Mackenzie Darragh	50 m butterfly	24.81	19	Did not advance			
Josiah Binnema	100 m butterfly	53.49	3 Q	53.41	8 Q	53.11	=5
Mackenzie Darragh	100 m butterfly	53.81	7 Q	53.43	9	Did not advance	
Mackenzie Darragh	200 m butterfly	1:56.96	1 Q	—N/a		1:57.81	6
Tristan Cote	200 m individual medley	2:03.09	14	—N/a		Did not advance	
Mackenzie Darragh	200 m individual medley	2:01.67	9	—N/a		Did not advance	
Tristan Cote	400 m individual medley	4:18.73	4 Q	—N/a		4:20.29	7
Yuri Kisil; Ruslan Gaziev; Markus Thormeyer; Carson Olafson; Jeremy Bagshaw*	4 × 100 m freestyle relay	3:19.30	5 Q	—N/a		3:16.98	5
Jeremy Bagshaw; Markus Thormeyer; Yuri Kisil; Carson Olafson	4 × 200 m freestyle relay	—N/a				7:14.12	4
Markus Thormeyer; Elijah Wall; Josiah Binnema; Yuri Kisil; Ruslan Gaziev*	4 × 100 m medley relay	3:40.79	4	—N/a		3:36.12	5

- Athletes with stars beside their names only race in the preliminary

Women

Athlete	Event	Heat		Semifinal		Final	
Athlete	Event	Time	Rank	Time	Rank	Time	Rank
Penny Oleksiak	50 m freestyle	Did not start		Did not advance			
Taylor Ruck	50 m freestyle	25.13	4 Q	24.72	4 Q	24.26	= (silver)
Kayla Sanchez	50 m freestyle	25.47	7 Q	25.20	6 Q	25.12	6
Penny Oleksiak	100 m freestyle	54.88	4 Q	54.34	6 Q	53.85	5
Taylor Ruck	100 m freestyle	54.79	2 Q	53.05	2 Q	53.08	3rd place, bronze medalist(s)
Kayla Sanchez	100 m freestyle	54.97	5 Q	54.18	5 Q	54.30	7
Penny Oleksiak	200 m freestyle	1:58.21	6 Q	—N/a		1:59.55	7
Taylor Ruck	200 m freestyle	1:57.44	3 Q	—N/a		1:54.81 CR, GR, NR	1st place, gold medalist(s)
Mary-Sophie Harvey	400 m freestyle	4:14.26	9	—N/a		Did not advance	
Jade Hannah	50 m backstroke	28.82	11 Q	28.37	8 Q	28.38	7
Kylie Masse	50 m backstroke	27.99	3 Q	28.00	3 Q	27.82	2nd place, silver medalist(s)
Alexia Zevnik	50 m backstroke	28.75	8 Q	28.56	10	Did not advance	
Jade Hannah	100 m backstroke	1:01.51	11 Q	1:00.37	6 Q	1:00.83	8
Kylie Masse	100 m backstroke	58.70 GR	1 Q	58.66 GR	1 Q	58.63 GR	1st place, gold medalist(s)
Taylor Ruck	100 m backstroke	1:00.72	6 Q	1:00.06	3 Q	58.97	3rd place, bronze medalist(s)
Hilary Caldwell	200 m backstroke	2:10.27	2 Q	—N/a		2:09.22	5
Kylie Masse	200 m backstroke	2:09.12	1 Q	—N/a		2:05.98 GR	1st place, gold medalist(s)
Taylor Ruck	200 m backstroke	2:12.62	7 Q	—N/a		2:06.42	2nd place, silver medalist(s)
Faith Knelson	50 m breaststroke	31.19	7 Q	31.22	7 Q	30.98	7
Rachel Nicol	50 m breaststroke	31.54	10 Q	31.87	11	Did not advance	
Faith Knelson	100 m breaststroke	1:08.50	5 Q	1:07.30	3 Q	1:07.84	4
Rachel Nicol	100 m breaststroke	1:08.87	7 Q	1:08.67	9	Did not advance	
Kierra Smith	100 m breaststroke	1:07.81	4 Q	1:07.64	4 Q	1:07.05	2nd place, silver medalist(s)
Sarah Darcel	200 m breaststroke	2:29.70	13	—N/a		Did not advance	
Mary-Sophie Harvey	200 m breaststroke	2:29.26	11	—N/a		Did not advance	
Kierra Smith	200 m breaststroke	2:25.33	4 Q	—N/a		2:23.62	4
Penny Oleksiak	50 m butterfly	25.95	3 Q	25.94	4 Q	25.88	4
Rebecca Smith	50 m butterfly	26.65	5 Q	26.68	5 Q	26.49	5
Penny Oleksiak	100 m butterfly	58.50	4 Q	58.29	6 Q	57.50	4
Rebecca Smith	100 m butterfly	58.51	5 Q	57.77	2 Q	57.91	6
Mabel Zavaros	100 m butterfly	59.44	9 Q	58.62	8 Q	58.98	8
Mabel Zavaros	200 m butterfly	2:08.71	3 Q	—N/a		2:09.20	6
Sarah Darcel	200 m individual medley	2:12.95	5 Q	—N/a		2:11.14	2nd place, silver medalist(s)
Kayla Sanchez	200 m individual medley	2:14.07	9	—N/a		Did not advance	
Erika Seltenreich-Hodgson	200 m individual medley	2:12.24	2 Q	—N/a		2:11.74	3rd place, bronze medalist(s)
Sarah Darcel	400 m individual medley	4:41.55	5 Q	—N/a		4:39.43	5
Mary-Sophie Harvey	400 m individual medley	4:43.40	7 Q	—N/a		4:43.51	8
Erika Seltenreich-Hodgson	400 m individual medley	4:41.81	6 Q	—N/a		4:38.51	4
Alexia Zevnik; Kayla Sanchez; Penny Oleksiak; Taylor Ruck	4 × 100 m freestyle relay	—N/a				3:33.92	2nd place, silver medalist(s)
Penny Oleksiak; Kayla Sanchez; Rebecca Smith; Taylor Ruck	4 × 200 m freestyle relay	—N/a				7:49.66	2nd place, silver medalist(s)
Penny Oleksiak; Kierra Smith; Kylie Masse; Taylor Ruck	4 × 100 m medley relay	—N/a				3:55.10	2nd place, silver medalist(s)

Para

Athlete	Event	Heat		Final	
Athlete	Event	Time	Rank	Time	Rank
Jean-Michel Lavalliere	Men's 50 m freestyle S7	30.37	4 Q	30.14	4
Philippe Vachon	Men's 100 m freestyle S9	1:02.61	9	Did not advance	
Philippe Vachon	Men's 100 m breaststroke SB8	1:30.28	8 Q	1:29.14	8
Philippe Vachon	Men's 200 m individual medley SM8	2:38.34	3 Q	2:34.03	3rd place, bronze medalist(s)
Zach Zona	Men's 200 m individual medley SM8	2:40.81	5 Q	2:41.66	5
Morgan Bird	Women's 50 m freestyle S8	32.27	2 Q	32.03	2nd place, silver medalist(s)
Abigail Tripp	Women's 50 m freestyle S8	32.54	3 Q	32.49	3rd place, bronze medalist(s)
Morgan Bird	Women's 100 m freestyle S9	1:09.76	7 Q	1:09.85	8
Katarina Roxon	Women's 100 m freestyle S9	1:07.84	5 Q	1:08.18	6
Abigail Tripp	Women's 100 m freestyle S9	1:10.47	8 Q	1:09.43	7
Sarah Girard	Women's 100 m breaststroke SB9	1:25.07	4 Q	1:23.82	4
Katarina Roxon	Women's 100 m breaststroke SB9	1:25.07	5 Q	1:26.18	6
Sarah Mehain	Women's 50 m butterfly S7	37.24	2 Q	37.69	2nd place, silver medalist(s)
Tess Routliffe	Women's 50 m butterfly S7	38.49	4 Q	37.85	3
Aurelie Rivard	Women's 200 m individual medley SM10	2:32.90	2 Q	2:31.79	2nd place, silver medalist(s)
Katarina Roxon	Women's 200 m individual medley SM10	2:45.77	8 Q	2:48.32	8
Samantha Ryan	Women's 200 m individual medley SM10	2:44.23	7 Q	2:43.63	7

== Table tennis ==
Canada's table tennis team of six athletes (three per gender) was named on 21 December 2017. Canada's table tennis team also consisted of two para sport athletes.

Singles

Athletes	Event	Group Stage			Round of 64	Round of 32	Round of 16	Quarterfinal	Semifinal	Final	Rank
Athletes	Event	Opposition Score	Opposition Score	Rank	Opposition Score	Opposition Score	Opposition Score	Opposition Score	Opposition Score	Opposition Score	Rank
Antoine Bernadet	Men's singles	Mtalaso (TAN); W 4–1	Britton (GUY); W 4–3	1 Q	Sirisena (SRI); W 4–1	Walker (ENG); L 0–4	Did not advance				
Marko Medjugorac	Men's singles	Miita (KIR); W 4–0	Su (BIZ); W 4–0	1 Q	Leong (MAS); L 1–4	Did not advance					
Eugene Wang	Men's singles	Bye				Abrefa (GHA); W 4–0	Drinkhall (ENG); W 4–2	Ning (SGP); L 1–4	Did not advance		
Alicia Cote	Women's singles	Ramaswamy (MRI); W 4–0	Greaves (GUY); W 4–0	1 Q	—N/a	Sibley (ENG); L 0–4	Did not advance				
Justina Yeung	Women's singles	Ali (PAK); W 4–0	Kapugeekiyana (SRI); L 0–4	2	—N/a	Did not advance					
Mo Zhang	Women's singles	Bye			—N/a	Bye	Payet (ENG); W 4–0	Lay (AUS); W 4–0	Yu (SGP); L 1–4	Feng (SGP); L 2–4	4

Doubles

Athletes	Event	Round of 64	Round of 32	Round of 16	Quarterfinal	Semifinal	Final	Rank
Athletes	Event	Opposition Score	Opposition Score	Opposition Score	Opposition Score	Opposition Score	Opposition Score	Rank
Marko Medjugorac; Eugene Wang	Men's doubles	Bye	Benjamin / Gboyah (SLE); W 3–0	Ning / Xue Jie (SGP); L 0–3	Did not advance			
Alicia Cote; Mo Zhang	Women's doubles	—N/a	Bye	Payet / Sibley (ENG); W 3–1	Mukherjee / Sahasrabudhe (IND); L 0–3	Did not advance		
Justina Yeung; Antoine Bernadet	Mixed doubles	Khawaja / Ali (PAK); W 3–0	Ning / Mengyu (SGP); L 1–3	Did not advance				
Alicia Cote; Marko Medjugorac	Mixed doubles	Bye	Abrefa / Kwabi (GHA); W 3–0	Gnanasekaran / Batra (IND); L 2–3	Did not advance			
Mo Zhang; Eugene Wang	Mixed doubles	Bye	Powell / Miao (AUS); W 3–1	Poh / Lin (SGP); W 3–2	Kamal / Das (IND); L 1–3	Did not advance		

Team

Athletes	Event	Group Stage			Round of 16	Quarterfinal	Semifinal	Final	Rank
Athletes	Event	Opposition Score	Opposition Score	Rank	Opposition Score	Opposition Score	Opposition Score	Opposition Score	Rank
Antoine Bernadet; Marko Medjugorac; Eugene Wang	Men's team	Saint Vincent and the Grenadines; W 3–0	Sri Lanka; W 3–1	1 Q	Guyana; W 3–0	Singapore; L 2–3	Did not advance		
Alicia Cote; Justina Yeung; Mo Zhang	Women's team	Australia; L 1–3	Mauritius; W 3–0	2 Q	—N/a	England; L 1–3	Did not advance		

Para-sport

Athletes	Event	Group Stage				Semifinal	Final	Rank
Athletes	Event	Opposition Score	Opposition Score	Opposition Score	Rank	Opposition Score	Opposition Score	Rank
Ian Kent	Men's TT6–10	Bakar (MAS); L 1–3	Stacey (WAL); L 0–3	Daybell (ENG); L 0–3	4	Did not advance		
Stephanie Chan	Women's TT6–10	Sutar (IND); W 3–0	McDonnell (AUS); L 0–3	Obazuaye (NGR); L 0–3	3	Did not advance		

== Triathlon ==
Canada named its triathlon team of six athletes (three per gender) on 13 November 2017.

Individual

Athlete	Event	Swim (750 m)	Trans 1	Bike (20 km)	Trans 2	Run (5 km)	Total	Rank
Alexis Lepage	Men's	9:00	0:35	28:01	0:30	15:55	54:00	13
Tyler Mislawchuk	Men's	8:59	0:33	28:03	0:30	15:55	54:00	12
Matthew Sharpe	Men's	9:07	0:34	27:53	0:24	15:36	53:34	9
Joanna Brown	Women's	09:48	00:37	30:12	00:30	16:31	57:48	3rd place, bronze medalist(s)
Dominika Jamnicky	Women's	09:57	00:38	31:18	00:29	18:46	1:01:08	14
Desirae Ridenour	Women's	10:04	00:35	32:24	00:27	20:16	1:03:46	17

Mixed Relay

Athletes	Event	Total Times per Athlete (Swim 250 m, Bike 7 km, Run 1.5 km)	Total Group Time	Rank
Joanna Brown; Tyler Mislawchuk; Desirae Ridenour; Matthew Sharpe	Mixed relay	20:26; 18:52; 21:05; 19:12	1:19:35	4

== Weightlifting ==
Canada qualified 11 weightlifters (5 men and 6 women). A 12th weightlifter was on the team (Edouard Freve-Guerin) but did not compete.

Men

Athlete	Event	Snatch		Clean & Jerk		Total	Rank
Athlete	Event	Result	Rank	Result	Rank	Total	Rank
Nicolas Vachon	−77 kg	131	5	168	3	299	4
Mathieu Marineau	−85 kg	138	9	174	7	312	8
Boady Santavy	−94 kg	168 GR	1	201	2	369	2nd place, silver medalist(s)
Ryan Meidl	−105 kg	145	6	186	6	331	6
Miklos Bencsik	+105 kg	145	7	200	6	345	7

Women

Athlete	Event	Snatch		Clean & Jerk		Total	Rank
Athlete	Event	Result	Rank	Result	Rank	Total	Rank
Amanda Braddock	−48 kg	76	3	Did not finish			
Rachel Leblanc-Bazinet	−53 kg	81	2	100	3	181	3rd place, bronze medalist(s)
Tali Darsigny	−58 kg	88	1	112	2	200	2nd place, silver medalist(s)
Maude Charron	−63 kg	98	1	122 GR	1	220	1st place, gold medalist(s)
Andreanne Messier	−69 kg	95	=4	116	=4	211	4
Marie-Eve Beauchemin-Nadeau	−75 kg	95	2	126	1	221	2nd place, silver medalist(s)

== Wrestling ==
Canada's wrestling team consisted of 12 athletes (six male and six female). The team was announced on 2 March 2018.

Key:

- VT - Victory by Fall.
- PP - Decision by Points - the loser with technical points.
- PO - Decision by Points - the loser without technical points.

Repechage Format

Athlete	Event	Round of 16	Quarterfinal	Semifinal	Repechage	Final / BM	
Athlete	Event	Opposition Result	Opposition Result	Opposition Result	Opposition Result	Opposition Result	Rank
Steven Takahashi	Men's -57 kg	Bye	Combrinck (RSA); W 3–1 ^{PP}	Welson (NGR); W 5–0 ^{VT}	—N/a	Aware (IND); L 1–3 ^{PP}	2nd place, silver medalist(s)
Vincent De Marinis	Men's -65 kg	Tarash (AUS); W 4–1 ^{PP}	Wahab (PAK); W 4–0 ^{PO}	Punia (IND); L 0–4 ^{PO}	Bye	Daniel (NGR); L 1–3 ^{PP}	5
Jevon Balfour	Men's -74 kg	Kumar (IND); L 0–4 ^{PO}	Did not advance		Butt (PAK); W 4–0 ^{PO}	Evans (AUS); W 4–1 ^{PP}	3rd place, bronze medalist(s)
Alexander Moore	Men's -86 kg	Gaitskill (RSA); W 4–1 ^{PP}	Wallen (JAM); W 4–0 ^{PO}	Inam (PAK); L 0–5 ^{VT}	Bye	Kadian (IND); L 1–3 ^{PP}	5
Jordan Steen	Men's -97 kg	Rattigan (ENG); W 4–0 ^{PO}	Ahmad (PAK); W 4–0 ^{PO}	Erasmus (RSA); L 1–4 ^{PP}	Bye	Belkin (NZL); W 4–0 ^{PO}	3rd place, bronze medalist(s)
Erica Wiebe	Women's -76 kg	—N/a	Kamara (SLE); W 5–0 ^{VT}	Nelthorpe (ENG); W 4–0 ^{PO}	—N/a	Oyebuchi (NGR); W 5–0 ^{VT}	1st place, gold medalist(s)

Group Stage Format

Athlete	Event	Group Stage			Semifinal	Final / BM	
Athlete	Event	Opposition Result	Opposition Result	Rank	Opposition Result	Opposition Result	Rank
Emily Schaefer	Women's -57 kg	Moceyawa (NZL); W 5–0 ^{VT}	Dhanda (IND); L 1–3 ^{PP}	2 Q	Adekuroye (NGR); L 0–4 ^{PO}	Essombe Tiako (CMR); W 4–1 ^{PP}	3rd place, bronze medalist(s)
Danielle Lappage	Women's -68 kg	Alakame Anzong (CMR); W 4–0 ^{PO}	Kakran (IND); W 4–1 ^{PP}	1 Q	Sultana (BAN); W 4–0 ^{PO}	Oborududu (NGR); L 1–3 ^{PP}	2nd place, silver medalist(s)

Nordic Format

Athlete	Event	Nordic Round Robin				Rank
Athlete	Event	Opposition Result	Opposition Result	Opposition Result	Opposition Result	Rank
Korey Jarvis	Men's -125 kg	Kouamen Mbianga (CMR); W 4–0 ^{PO}	Boltic (NGR); W INJ	Malik (IND); L 1–3 ^{PP}	Raza (PAK); W 5–0 ^{VT}	2nd place, silver medalist(s)
Jessica MacDonald	Women's -50 kg	Kumar (AUS); W 4–0 ^{PO}	Genesis (NGR); W 4–0 ^{PO}	Phogat (IND); L 1–4 ^{PP}	—N/a	2nd place, silver medalist(s)
Diana Weicker	Women's -53 kg	Holland (AUS); W 4–0 ^{PO}	Dilhani (SRI); W 4–0 ^{PO}	Samuel (NGR); W 4–0 ^{PO}	Kumari (IND); W 3–1 ^{PP}	1st place, gold medalist(s)
Michelle Fazzari	Women's -62 kg	Ford (NZL); W 4–1 ^{PP}	Malik (IND); W 3–1 ^{PP}	Etane Ngolle (CMR); W 3–0 ^{PO}	Adeniyi (NGR); L 0–5 ^{INJ}	2nd place, silver medalist(s)

== See also ==
- Canada at the 2018 Winter Olympics
- Canada at the 2018 Winter Paralympics
- Canada at the 2018 Summer Youth Olympics
