= Basketball at the 2018 Commonwealth Games – Men's tournament =

Basketball at the 2018 Commonwealth Games
- Venue: Cairns Convention Centre; Townsville Entertainment and Convention Centre; Gold Coast Convention and Exhibition Centre
- Dates: 5–15 April 2018
- Competitors: 96 from 8 nations

Medalists
| gold medal | Australia |
| silver medal | Canada |
| bronze medal | New Zealand |

The men's basketball tournament at the 2018 Commonwealth Games was held on the Gold Coast, Australia from April 5 to 15. The basketball competition was held at three venues: Cairns Convention Centre in Cairns, Townsville Entertainment and Convention Centre in Townsville for the preliminaries and the Gold Coast Convention and Exhibition Centre on the Gold Coast for the finals. This was the second time that the basketball competition was held at the Commonwealth Games. A total of eight men's competed (96 athletes, at 12 per team) in each respective tournament. Australia won the gold medal, defeating Canada in the final. New Zealand won the bronze medal.

== Venues ==
Three venues in Queensland were used. All seat 5,000 for the basketball competitions.

| Gold Coast | Cairns | Basketball at the 2018 Commonwealth Games – Men's tournament is located in Australia | Townsville |
| Gold Coast Convention and Exhibition Centre | Cairns Convention Centre | Basketball at the 2018 Commonwealth Games – Men's tournament is located in Australia | Townsville Entertainment and Convention Centre |
| Capacity: 5,000 | Capacity: 5,000 | Basketball at the 2018 Commonwealth Games – Men's tournament is located in Australia | Capacity: 5,000 |

== Qualification ==
A total of eight men's teams qualified to compete at the games. At least four out of the six Commonwealth regions were considered to be represented in each tournament, if possible. For the home nations, each country may compete, however the ranking of Great Britain was given to the home nation with the most players on the team. The teams were officially confirmed on July 28, 2017.

| Event | Date | Vacancies | Qualified |
|---|---|---|---|
| Host Nation | —N/a | 1 | Australia |
| Best Commonwealth Teams in the FIBA World Rankings | 1 July 2017 | 3 | Nigeria; New Zealand; Canada |
| CGF/FIBA invitation | 7 July 2017 | 4 | England; Scotland; Cameroon; India |
| Total | | 8 | |

== Rosters ==
At the start of tournament, all eight participating countries had up to 12 players on their rosters.

- Australia
- Cameroon
- Canada
- England
- India
- New Zealand
- Nigeria
- Scotland

== Competition format ==
The tournament was held under an unusual, seeded-group format.

The host nation, along with the top three teams in the FIBA Rankings played in higher group, group A. The other four teams played in the lower group, group B.

The top two teams in group A after the preliminary round advanced to the semifinals, while third and fourth place entered the quarterfinals where they played the top two teams in group B from the preliminary round. The bottom two teams in group B were eliminated. The winners of the quarterfinals proceeded to meet the semifinalists in a straight knockout format.

== Medalists ==
| Event | Gold | Silver | Bronze |
|---|---|---|---|
| Men | Australia; Lucas Walker; Cameron Gliddon; Chris Goulding; Jason Cadee; Mitch Norton; Nick Kay; Brad Newley; Daniel Kickert; Angus Brandt; Damian Martin; Nathan Sobey; Jesse Wagstaff | Canada; Ammanuel Diressa; Jean Pierre-Charles; Justus Alleyn; Mamadou Gueye; Jean-Victor Mukama; Munis Tutu; Grant Shephard; Mambi Diawara; David Kapinga; Conor Morgan; Erik Nissen; Michael Shoveller | New Zealand; Reuben Te Rangi; Finn Delany; Shea Ili; Jarrod Kenny; Mika Vukona; Derone Raukawa; Thomas Abercrombie; Robert Loe; Tohi Smith-Milner; Jordan Ngatai; Ethan Rusbatch; Alex Pledger |

== Results ==
All times are Australian Eastern Standard Time (UTC+10)

=== Preliminary round ===
==== Pool A ====
| Team | Pld | W | L | PF | PA | PD | Pts | Qualification |
|---|---|---|---|---|---|---|---|---|
| Australia | 3 | 3 | 0 | 271 | 183 | +88 | 6 | Semifinals |
| New Zealand | 3 | 2 | 1 | 265 | 204 | +61 | 5 | Semifinals |
| Canada | 3 | 1 | 2 | 197 | 244 | −47 | 4 | Qualifying finals |
| Nigeria | 3 | 0 | 3 | 187 | 289 | −102 | 3 | Qualifying finals |

6 April 2018
17:30

Boxscore

| Australia | 95–55 | Canada |
Scoring by quarter: 25–13, 22–16, 22–13, 26–13
| Pts: Kickert 14; Rebs: Brandt, Sobey 11; Asts: Goulding 6 | | Pts: Diawara 10; Rebs: Morgan 6 Asts: Tutu 6 |

Cairns Convention Centre, Cairns
Referees: Bermudez (MEX), Gyoergyi (NOR),
Vincent (IND)

6 April 2018
20:00

Boxscore

| Nigeria | 65–110 | New Zealand |
Scoring by quarter: 15–24, 20–26, 8–31, 22–29
| Pts: Dike 15; Rebs: Achiuwa 8 Asts: Ofoegbu, Achiuwa 2 | | Pts: Abercrombie 21; Rebs: Pledger 10; Asts: Ili, Kenny 6 |

Cairns Convention Centre, Cairns
Referees: Liszka (POL), Kom Njilo (CMR),
Unsworth (GBR)

7 April 2018
14:00

Boxscore

| Canada | 82–67 | Nigeria |
Scoring by quarter: 23–16, 20–21, 14–15, 25–15
| Pts: Diressa, Alleyn 24; Rebs: Tutu 6 Asts: Nissen 4 | | Pts: Diogu 29; Rebs: Diogu 15; Asts: Iroegbu, Diogu 3 |

Cairns Convention Centre, Cairns
Referees: Boyer (AUS), Kom Njilo (CMR),
Unsworth (GBR)

7 April 2018
21:00

Boxscore

| New Zealand | 73–79 | Australia |
Scoring by quarter: 21–19, 19–16, 19-21, 14-23
| Pts: Ili 22; Rebs: Delany 6 Asts: Ili 4 | | Pts: Kay 21; Rebs: Sobey 6 Asts: Cadee 3 |

Cairns Convention Centre, Cairns
Referees: Bermudez (MEX), Liszka (POL),
Dodds (GBR)

9 April 2018
18:30

Boxscore

| Canada | 60–82 | New Zealand |
Scoring by quarter: 14–20, 17–20, 12–23, 17–19
| Pts: Kapinga 19; Rebs: Morgan 6 Asts: Diawara, Kapinga 2 | | Pts: Abercrombie 17; Rebs: Abercrombie 9 Asts: Ili 5 |

Cairns Convention Centre, Cairns
Referees: Bermudez (MEX), Boyer (AUS),
Decastro (MOZ)

9 April 2018
21:00

Boxscore

| Australia | 97–55 | Nigeria |
Scoring by quarter: 23-17, 25-10, 28-14, 21-14
| Pts: Brandt 16; Rebs: Cadee 9 Asts: Sobey 5 | | Pts: Diogu 19; Rebs: Achiuwa 8 Asts: Ofoegbu 3 |

Cairns Convention Centre, Cairns
Referees: Liszka (POL), Kom Njilo (CMR), Dodds (GBR)

==== Pool B ====
| Team | Pld | W | L | PF | PA | PD | Pts | Qualification |
|---|---|---|---|---|---|---|---|---|
| Scotland | 3 | 3 | 0 | 237 | 198 | +39 | 6 | Qualifying finals |
| England | 3 | 2 | 1 | 246 | 186 | +60 | 5 | Qualifying finals |
| Cameroon | 3 | 1 | 2 | 202 | 231 | −29 | 4 | |
| India | 3 | 0 | 3 | 222 | 292 | −70 | 3 | |

5 April 2018
17:30

Boxscore

| England | 65–78 | Scotland |
Scoring by quarter: 19–17, 13–18, 16–14, 17–29
| Pts: Walker 17; Rebs: Jackman 9 Asts: Jackman 5 | | Pts: Bunyah 18; Rebs: Fraser, Achara 8 Asts: Fraser, Achara 4 |

Townsville Entertainment and Convention Centre, Townsville
Referees: Matthew Beattie (USA), Kingsley Ojeaburu (UGR)

5 April 2018
20:00

Boxscore

| Cameroon | 96–87 | India |
Scoring by quarter: 15–27, 24–36, 23–13, 34–11
| Pts: Kome 21; Rebs: Tsaace 13; Asts: Ngijol 3 | | Pts: At. Singh 23; Rebs: Annadurai 12; Asts: J. Singh 8 |

Townsville Entertainment and Convention Centre, Townsville
Referees: Michael Weiland (CAN), Ryan Jones (NZL)

7 April 2018
17:30

Boxscore

| England | 100–54 | India |
Scoring by quarter: 19–15, 27–9, 29–11, 25–19
| Pts: Thoseby 20; Rebs: Walker 8 Asts: Jones 6 | | Pts: Annadurai 22; Rebs: Y. Singh 7 Asts: At. Singh 5 |

Townsville Entertainment and Convention Centre, Townsville
Referees: Takaki Kato (JPN), Ryan Jones (NZL)

7 April 2018
20:00

Boxscore

| Scotland | 63–52 | Cameroon |
Scoring by quarter: 15–4, 14–11, 15–25, 19–12
| Pts: Murray 25; Rebs: Fraser 9 Asts: Achara, Murray 3 | | Pts: Kome 21; Rebs: Yangue 13; Asts: Essome 5 |

Townsville Entertainment and Convention Centre, Townsville
Referees: Leonardo Zalazar (ARG), Jon Chapman (AUS)

8 April 2018
14:00

Boxscore

| Cameroon | 54–81 | England |
Scoring by quarter: 15-20, 16-17, 14-29, 9-15
| Pts: Bogmis 14; Rebs: Yangue 10; Asts: Essome 3 | | Pts: Josephs 26; Rebs: Jackman 8 Asts: Thoseby, Tuck 3 |

Townsville Entertainment and Convention Centre, Townsville
Referees: Leonardo Zalazar (ARG), Matthew Beattie (AUS)

8 April 2018
21:00

Boxscore

| India | 81–96 | Scotland |
Scoring by quarter: 26–33, 15–16, 11–29, 29–18
| Pts: J. Singh 27; Rebs: J. Singh 14; Asts: At. Singh 7 | | Pts: Collins 16; Rebs: Vigor 12; Asts: Vigor 7 |

Townsville Entertainment and Convention Centre, Townsville
Referees: Kingsley Ojeaburu (NGR), Matthew Bathurst (NZL)

=== Medal round ===
Qualifying finals
A4 | Nigeria | 61
B1 | Scotland | 66
A3 | Canada | 97
B2 | England | 79

Semi-finals
A1 | Australia | 103
B1 | Scotland | 46
A2 | New Zealand | 86
A3 | Canada | 88

Gold medal match
A1 | Australia | 87
A3 | Canada | 47
Third place
B1 | Scotland | 69
A2 | New Zealand | 79

==== Qualifying finals ====
10 April 2018
17:30

Boxscore

| Nigeria | 61–66 | Scotland |
Scoring by quarter: 16–23, 12–17, 18–6, 15–20
| Pts: Diogu 24; Rebs: Diogu 15; Asts: Iroegbu, Ofoegbu 4 | | Pts: Murray 17; Rebs: Murray, Achara 8 Asts: Malcolm 4 |

Cairns Convention Centre, Cairns
Referees: Arnauld Kom Njilo (CMR), Artur Decastro (MOZ)

10 April 2018
20:00

Boxscore

| Canada | 97–79 | England |
Scoring by quarter: 30–12, 25–14, 22–32, 20–21
| Pts: Morgan 24; Rebs: Pierre-Charles 8 Asts: Tutu, Diressa 4 | | Pts: Thoseby, Josephs 20; Rebs: Gilchrist, Josephs 8 Asts: Thoseby 4 |

Cairns Convention Centre, Cairns
Referees: Liszka (POL), Boyer (AUS)
Dodds (GBR)

==== Semifinals ====
14 April 2018
10:00

Boxscore

| Australia | 103–46 | Scotland |
Scoring by quarter: 20–4, 28–18, 35–10, 20–14
| Pts: Wagstaff 17; Rebs: Brandt 6 Asts: Sobey 6 | | Pts: Malcolm, Fraser 9 Rebs: Murray, Nealon-Lino 4 Asts: Bunyan 6 |

Gold Coast Convention and Exhibition Centre, Gold Coast
Referees: Leonardo Zalazar (ARG), Kingsley Ojeaburu (NGR)

14 April 2018
12:30

Boxscore

| New Zealand | 86–88 | Canada |
Scoring by quarter: 16–22, 26–23, 16–30, 28–13
| Pts: Ili 23; Rebs: Mika Vukona 15; Asts: Ili 7 | | Pts: Diressa 22; Rebs: Pierre-Charles 7 Asts: Tutu 6 |

Gold Coast Convention and Exhibition Centre, Gold Coast
Referees: Liszka (POL), Kato (JPN),
Kom Njilo (CMR)

==== Bronze medal match ====
15 April 2018
09:00

Boxscore

| Scotland | 69–79 | New Zealand |
Scoring by quarter: 21–19, 14–22, 9–18, 25–20
| Pts: Bunyan 13; Rebs: Fraser 6 Asts: Bunyan 5 | | Pts: Abercrombie 26; Rebs: Loe 10; Asts: Loe 4 |

Gold Coast Convention and Exhibition Centre, Gold Coast
Referees: Beattie (USA), Weiland (CAN),
Boyer (AUS)

==== Gold medal match ====
15 April 2018
11:30

Boxscore

| Australia | 87–47 | Canada |
Scoring by quarter: 20–10, 25–9, 18–10, 24–18
| Pts: Goulding 11; Rebs: Sobey 8 Asts: Gliddon 5 | | Pts: Tutu 10; Rebs: Tutu 6 Asts: Morgan, Tutu 3 |

Gold Coast Convention and Exhibition Centre, Gold Coast
Referees: Omar Bermúdez (MEX), Wojciech Liszka (POL), Leonardo Zalazar (ARG)

== Final standings ==
| Rank | Team | Pld | W | L | PF | PA | PD |
|---|---|---|---|---|---|---|---|
| 1st place, gold medalist(s) | Australia | 5 | 5 | 0 | 461 | 276 | +185 |
| 2nd place, silver medalist(s) | Canada | 6 | 3 | 3 | 429 | 496 | –67 |
| 3rd place, bronze medalist(s) | New Zealand | 5 | 3 | 2 | 430 | 361 | +69 |
| 4 | Scotland | 6 | 4 | 2 | 418 | 441 | –23 |
| 5 | England | 4 | 2 | 2 | 325 | 283 | +42 |
| 6 | Nigeria | 4 | 0 | 4 | 248 | 355 | –107 |
| 7 | Cameroon | 3 | 1 | 2 | 202 | 231 | –29 |
| 8 | India | 3 | 0 | 3 | 222 | 292 | –70 |
