= Alex Dupont =

Alex Dupont may refer to:

- Alex Dupont (athlete) (born 1985), Canadian wheelchair racer
- Alex Dupont (footballer) (1954–2020), French football player and manager
