= Robert Pitcairn (disambiguation) =

Robert Pitcairn (1836 – 1909) was a Scottish-American railroad executive.

Robert Pitcairn may also refer to:

- Robert Pitcairn (antiquary) (1793–1855), Scottish antiquary and scholar
- Robert Pitcairn (commendator) (died 1584), Scottish administrator, diplomat and judge, secretary of state and commendator of Dunfermline
- Robert Pitcairn (Royal Navy officer) (1752–c. 1770), Royal Navy midshipman, first European to sight Pitcairn Island
- Robert Pitcairn (athlete), (born 1938), Canadian sport shooter
