= Diving at the 2018 Commonwealth Games =

- 2018 Commonwealth Games diving pictogram
- Venue: Gold Coast Aquatic Centre
- Dates: 11 – 14 April 2018
- Competitors: 69 from 11 nations

Diving at the 2018 Commonwealth Games was the 21st appearance of Diving at the Commonwealth Games. The diving competitions at the 2018 Commonwealth Games in the Gold Coast, Queensland was held from 10 to 14 April at the Gold Coast Aquatic Centre. A total of ten events was contested (five for men and five for women).

== Schedule ==
| P | Preliminaries | F | Final |

| Date → | Wed 11 | | Thu 12 | | Fri 13 | | Sat 14 | |
| Event ↓ | M | E | M | E | M | E | M | E |
|---|---|---|---|---|---|---|---|---|
| Men's 1 m springboard | P | F | | | | | | |
| Men's 3 m springboard | | | P | F | | | | |
| Men's 10 m platform | | | | | | | P | F |
| Men's synchronised 3 m springboard | | | | | | F | | |
| Men's synchronised 10 m platform | | | | | F | | | |
| Women's 1 m springboard | | | | | P | F | | |
| Women's 3 m springboard | | | | | | | P | F |
| Women's 10 m platform | | | P | F | | | | |
| Women's synchronised 3 m springboard | F | | | | | | | |
| Women's synchronised 10 m platform | | F | | | | | | |

M = Morning session, E = Evening session

== Medal summary ==
=== Medal table ===
* Host nation (Australia)

| Rank | Nation | Gold | Silver | Bronze | Total |
|---|---|---|---|---|---|
| 1 | England | 4 | 3 | 1 | 8 |
| 2 | Australia* | 3 | 3 | 5 | 11 |
| 3 | Canada | 1 | 4 | 1 | 6 |
| 4 | Malaysia | 1 | 0 | 2 | 3 |
| 5 | Scotland | 1 | 0 | 1 | 2 |
| Totals (5 entries) | | 10 | 10 | 10 | 30 |

=== Men ===
| Event | Gold | | Silver | | Bronze | |
|---|---|---|---|---|---|---|
| 1 m springboard | Jack Laugher; England | 438.00 | James Connor; Australia | 412.45 | James Heatly; Scotland | 399.25 |
| 3 m springboard | Jack Laugher; England | 519.40 | Philippe Gagne; Canada | 452.70 | James Connor; Australia | 438.50 |
| 10 m platform | Domonic Bedggood; Australia | 451.15 | Matthew Dixon; England | 449.55 | Vincent Riendeau; Canada | 425.40 |
| Synchronised 3 m springboard | England; Jack Laugher; Chris Mears | 436.17 | Canada; Philippe Gagne; Francois Imbeau-Dulac | 415.23 | Australia; Domonic Bedggood; Matthew Taylor | 408.12 |
| Synchronised 10 m platform | England; Tom Daley; Daniel Goodfellow | 405.81 | England; Matthew Dixon; Noah Williams | 399.99 | Australia; Domonic Bedggood; Dec Stacey | 397.92 |

=== Women ===
| Event | Gold | | Silver | | Bronze | |
|---|---|---|---|---|---|---|
| 1 m springboard | Grace Reid; Scotland | 275.30 | Georgia Sheehan; Australia | 264.00 | Esther Qin; Australia | 252.95 |
| 3 m springboard | Jennifer Abel; Canada | 366.95 | Maddison Keeney; Australia | 366.55 | Anabelle Smith; Australia | 336.90 |
| 10 m platform | Melissa Wu; Australia | 360.40 | Meaghan Benfeito; Canada | 359.75 | Lois Toulson; England | 344.20 |
| Synchronised 3 m springboard | Australia; Esther Qin; Georgia Sheehan | 284.10 | England; Alicia Blagg; Katherine Torrance | 276.90 | Malaysia; Leong Mun Yee; Nur Dhabitah Sabri | 264.90 |
| Synchronised 10 m platform | Malaysia; Cheong Jun Hoong; Pandelela Rinong Pamg | 328.08 | Canada; Meaghan Benfeito; Caeli McKay | 312.12 | Malaysia; Leong Mun Yee; Nur Dhabitah Sabri | 308.16 |

== Participating nations ==
There were 11 participating nations in diving with a total of 69 athletes. The number of athletes a nation entered is in parentheses beside the name of the country.

- Australia (14)
- Canada (12)
- England (13)
- Jamaica (1)
- Malaysia (13)
- New Zealand (5)
- Scotland (4)
- Singapore (1)
- South Africa (3)
- Sri Lanka (2)
- Wales (1)
