= Athletics at the 2018 Commonwealth Games – Men's 1500 metres (T54) =

Men's 1500 metres (T54) at the 2018 Commonwealth Games
- Venue: Carrara Stadium
- Dates: 9 April (heats); 10 April (final)
- Competitors: 11 from 5 nations
- Winning time: 3:11.75

Medalists
| gold medal | Alex Dupont | Canada |
| silver medal | Kurt Fearnley | Australia |
| bronze medal | Jake Lappin | Australia |

The men's 1500 metres (T54) at the 2018 Commonwealth Games, as part of the athletics programme, took place in the Carrara Stadium on 9 and 10 April 2018. The event was open to para-sport athletes competing under the T53 / T54 classifications.

== Records ==
Prior to this competition, the existing world and Games records were as follows:

| World record | Brent Lakatos (CAN) | 2:51.84 (T53/54) | Nottwil, Switzerland | 4 June 2017 |
| Games record | Kurt Fearnley (AUS) | 3:19.65 (T54) | Glasgow, Scotland | 29 July 2014 |

== Schedule ==
The schedule was as follows:

| Date | Time | Round |
|---|---|---|
| Monday 9 April 2018 | 12:00 | First round |
| Tuesday 10 April 2018 | 20:27 | Final |

All times are Australian Eastern Standard Time (UTC+10)

== Results ==
=== First round ===
The first round consisted of two heats. The three fastest competitors per heat (plus four fastest losers) advanced to the final.

Heat 1

| Rank | Order | Name | Sport Class | Result | Notes | Qual. |
|---|---|---|---|---|---|---|
| 1 | 5 | Jake Lappin (AUS) | T54 | 3:11.72 | GR | Q |
| 2 | 4 | Dillon Labrooy (ENG) | T54 | 3:12.07 | | Q |
| 3 | 1 | Tristan Smyth (CAN) | T54 | 3:12.20 | | Q |
| 4 | 2 | Sam Rizzo (AUS) | T54 | 3:12.91 | | q |
| 5 | 3 | Nkegbe Botsyo (GHA) | T54 | 3:25.55 | SB | q |

Heat 2

| Rank | Order | Name | Sport Class | Result | Notes | Qual. |
|---|---|---|---|---|---|---|
| 1 | 6 | Richard Chiassaro (ENG) | T54 | 3:05.76 | GR | Q |
| 2 | 1 | Kurt Fearnley (AUS) | T54 | 3:06.72 | | Q |
| 3 | 2 | Nathan Maguire (ENG) | T54 | 3:06.95 | | Q |
| 4 | 4 | Alex Dupont (CAN) | T54 | 3:07.30 | | q |
| 5 | 3 | Jack Agnew (NIR) | T54 | 3:13.78 | | q |
| 6 | 5 | Felix Acheampong (GHA) | T54 | 3:30.66 | | |

=== Final ===
The medals were determined in the final.

| Rank | Order | Name | Sport Class | Result | Notes |
|---|---|---|---|---|---|
| 1st place, gold medalist(s) | 3 | Alex Dupont (CAN) | T54 | 3:11.75 | |
| 2nd place, silver medalist(s) | 6 | Kurt Fearnley (AUS) | T54 | 3:11.92 | |
| 3rd place, bronze medalist(s) | 8 | Jake Lappin (AUS) | T54 | 3:12.60 | |
| 4 | 4 | Nathan Maguire (ENG) | T54 | 3:12.73 | |
| 5 | 7 | Dillon Labrooy (ENG) | T54 | 3:12.82 | |
| 6 | 1 | Sam Rizzo (AUS) | T54 | 3:14.16 | |
| 7 | 9 | Tristan Smyth (CAN) | T54 | 3:14.88 | |
| 8 | 10 | Richard Chiassaro (ENG) | T54 | 3:18.63 | |
| 9 | 5 | Nkegbe Botsyo (GHA) | T54 | 3:18.71 | SB |
| 10 | 2 | Jack Agnew (NIR) | T54 | 3:19.03 | |
