= Diving at the 2018 Commonwealth Games – Men's 10 metre platform =

Men's 10 metre platform at the 2018 Commonwealth Games
- Venue: Gold Coast Aquatic Centre
- Date: 14 April
- Competitors: 13 from 7 nations
- Winning score: 451.15

Medalists
gold medal	Domonic Bedggood	Australia
silver medal	Matthew Dixon	England
bronze medal	Vincent Riendeau	Canada

The men's 10 metre platform was part of the Diving at the 2018 Commonwealth Games program. The competition was held on 14 April 2018 at Gold Coast Aquatic Centre in Gold Coast.

== Format ==
The competition was held in two rounds:

- Preliminary round: All 13 divers perform five dives; the top 12 divers advance to the final.
- Final: The 12 divers perform five dives; the preliminary round scores are erased and the top three divers win the gold, silver and bronze medals accordingly.

== Schedule ==
All times are Australian Eastern Standard Time (UTC+10).

Date	Start	Round
14 April	11:59	Preliminary
14 April	21:09	Finals

== Results ==
Results:

Green denotes finalists

Rank	Diver	Preliminary		Final	
Rank	Diver	Points	Rank	Points	Rank
1st place, gold medalist(s)	Domonic Bedggood (AUS)	393.75	4	451.15	1
2nd place, silver medalist(s)	Matthew Dixon (ENG)	429.70	1	449.55	2
3rd place, bronze medalist(s)	Vincent Riendeau (CAN)	371.15	8	425.40	3
4	Noah Williams (ENG)	427.25	2	405.85	4
5	Lucas Thomson (SCO)	321.65	10	402.80	5
6	Aidan Heslop (WAL)	385.10	5	395.95	6
7	Declan Stacey (AUS)	401.75	3	393.20	7
8	Rylan Wiens (CAN)	359.60	9	370.30	8
9	Chew Yiwei (MAS)	382.55	6	362.10	9
10	Matthew Barnard (AUS)	319.95	11	350.35	10
11	Matthew Lee (ENG)	380.85	7	341.20	11
12	Tyler Henschel (CAN)	313.35	12	320.85	12
13	Sahan Peiris (SRI)	181.00	13	did not advance	
