= Diving at the 2018 Commonwealth Games – Men's 1 metre springboard =

Men's 1 metre springboard at the 2018 Commonwealth Games
- Venue: Gold Coast Aquatic Centre
- Date: 11 April
- Competitors: 15 from 8 nations
- Winning score: 438.00

Medalists
gold medal	Jack Laugher	England
silver medal	James Connor	Australia
bronze medal	James Heatly	Scotland

The men's 1 metre springboard was part of the Diving at the 2018 Commonwealth Games program. The competition was held on 11 April 2018 at Gold Coast Aquatic Centre in Gold Coast.

== Format ==
The competition was held in two rounds:

- Preliminary round: All 15 divers perform six dives; the top 12 divers advance to the final.
- Final: The 12 divers perform six dives; the preliminary round scores are erased and the top three divers win the gold, silver and bronze medals accordingly.

== Schedule ==
All times are Australian Eastern Standard Time (UTC+10).

Date	Start	Round
11 April	10:07	Preliminary
11 April	19:07	Finals

== Results ==
Results:

Green denotes finalists

Rank	Diver	Preliminary		Final	
Rank	Diver	Points	Rank	Points	Rank
1st place, gold medalist(s)	Jack Laugher (ENG)	399.80	1	438.00	1
2nd place, silver medalist(s)	James Connor (AUS)	354.45	6	412.45	2
3rd place, bronze medalist(s)	James Heatly (SCO)	366.05	3	399.25	3
4	Yona Knight-Wisdom (JAM)	368.15	2	388.65	4
5	Muhammad Syafiq Puteh (MAS)	306.80	8	378.90	5
6	Ahmad Amsyar Azman (MAS)	343.75	7	369.40	6
7	Matthew Carter (AUS)	361.45	5	368.85	7
8	Ross Haslam (ENG)	363.75	4	368.30	8
9	Kurtis Mathews (AUS)	258.15	12	367.60	9
10	Jack Haslam (ENG)	305.40	9	325.05	10
11	Ooi Tze Liang (MAS)	302.30	10	319.00	11
12	Lucas Thomson (SCO)	295.40	11	288.05	12
13	Liam Stone (NZL)	255.90	13	did not advance	
14	Mark Lee (SGP)	236.60	14	did not advance	
15	Sahan Peiris (SRI)	181.25	15	did not advance	
