= Athletics at the 2014 Commonwealth Games – Men's 1500 metres (T54) =

The Men's 1,500 metres (T54) at the 2014 Commonwealth Games as part of the athletics programme was held at Hampden Park between 30 and 31 July 2014. The event was open to Para-sport wheelchair athletes competing under the T54 classification.

== Results ==
=== First round ===
The first round consisted of two heats, with qualification to the finals for the first three in each heat and the four fastest losers over the two heats.

==== Heat 1 ====
Rank	Lane	Name	Result	Notes	Qual.
1	1	David Weir (ENG)	3:28.24		Q
2	7	Josh Cassidy (CAN)	3:29.81		Q
3	2	Richard Colman (AUS)	3:30.09		Q
4	6	Richard Nicholson (AUS)	3:30.12		q
5	5	Sebastien Ravet (MRI)	3:37.96	PB	q
6	3	Emmanuel Boateng (GHA)	3:44.44	PB	
7	4	Henry caleb caleb otieno Odiyo (KEN)	3:58.51	PB	

==== Heat 2 ====
Rank	Lane	Name	Result	Notes	Qual.
1	1	Kurt Fearnley (AUS)	3:19.65		Q
2	7	Alex Dupont (CAN)	3:29.81		Q
3	2	William Smith (AUS)	3:24.80		Q
4	6	Felix Acheampong (GHA)	3:33.90	SB	q
5	5	Samuel kuria Ngige (KEN)	3:42.53	PB	q
6	3	Patrick Obeng (GHA)	3:48.11		
7	4	Nitesh Momine (MRI)	4:18.67	PB	

=== Final ===
Rank	Lane	Name	Result	Notes
1st place, gold medalist(s)	6	David Weir (ENG)	3:21.67	
2nd place, silver medalist(s)	1	Kurt Fearnley (AUS)	3:23.08	
3rd place, bronze medalist(s)	10	Alex Dupont (CAN)	3:23.62	
4	7	Richard Colman (AUS)	3:24.37	
5	5	William Smith (ENG)	3:25.04	
6	4	Josh Cassidy (CAN)	3:27.34	
7	3	Richard Nicholson (AUS)	3:32.11	
8	9	Felix Acheampong (GHA)	3:33.40	PB
9	2	Sebastien Ravet (MRI)	3:42.97	
10	8	Samuel kuria Ngige (KEN)	3:49.79	
