= Georgia Southwestern State Hurricanes =

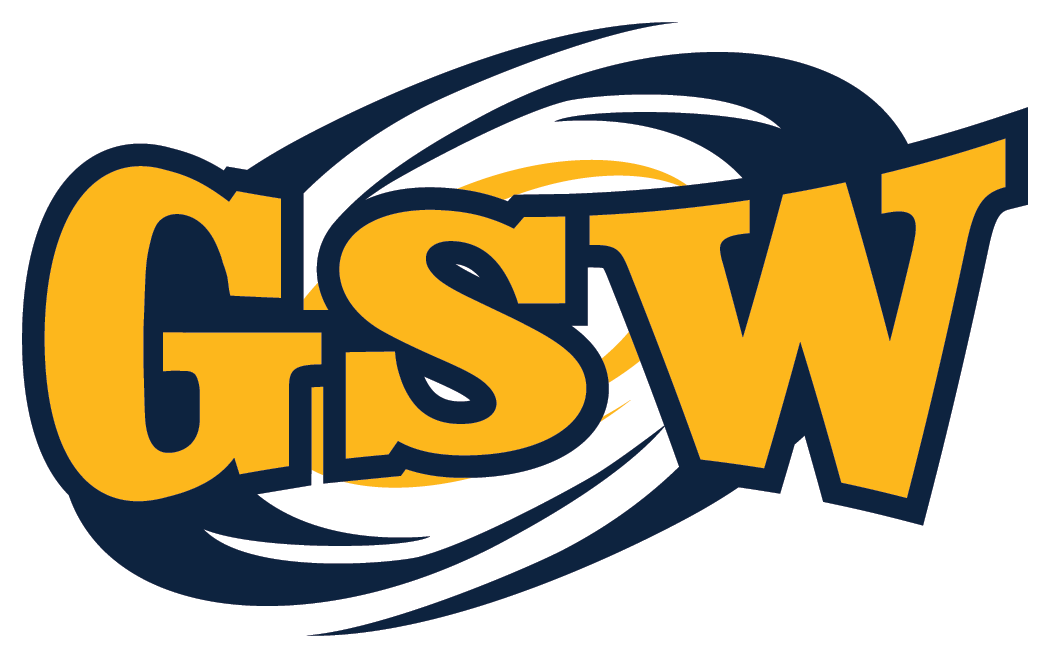
- University: Georgia Southwestern State University
- Conference: Peach Belt (primary)
- NCAA: Division II
- Athletic director: Mike Leeder
- Location: Americus, Georgia
- Varsity teams: 10 (5 men's, 5 women's)
- Basketball arena: Storm Dome
- Baseball stadium: Hurricane Stadium
- Softball stadium: Lady Canes Softball Field
- Soccer stadium: Hurricane Field
- Tennis venue: Susan K. Smith Tennis Complex
- Mascot: Surge
- Nickname: Hurricanes
- Colors: Navy and Gold
- Website: www.gswcanes.com

The Georgia Southwestern State Hurricanes (also Georgia Southwestern or GSW) are the athletic teams that represent the Georgia Southwestern State University, located in Americus, Georgia, in intercollegiate sports at the Division II level of the National Collegiate Athletic Association (NCAA), primarily competing in the Peach Belt Conference since the 2006–07 academic year.

Georgia Southwestern competes in ten intercollegiate varsity sports. Men's sports include baseball, basketball, cross country, golf, and soccer; while women's sports include basketball, cross country, soccer, softball, and tennis.

== Conference affiliations ==
NAIA

- Southern States Athletic Conference (1999–2006)

NCAA

- Peach Belt Conference (2006–present)

== Varsity teams ==
In addition to its varsity programs, Georgia Southwestern State also sponsors a club e-sports team.

Men's sports	Women's sports
Baseball	Basketball
Basketball	Cross country
Cross country	Soccer
Golf	Softball
Soccer	Tennis

=== Former sports ===
Football was played at the university between 1983 and 1989. The men's tennis program was discontinued in 2019, while men's cross country was added.

== Notable alumni ==
=== Men's basketball ===
- Devon Higgs
- Adam Thoseby

=== Men's golf ===
- Vincent Norrman
