= Diving at the 2018 Commonwealth Games – Women's synchronised 10 metre platform =

Women's synchronised 10 metre platform at the 2018 Commonwealth Games
- Venue: Gold Coast Aquatic Centre
- Date: April 11
- Competitors: 12 from 4 nations
- Winning score: 328.08

Medalists
gold medal	Cheong Jun Hoong; Pandelela Rinong	Malaysia
silver medal	Meaghan Benfeito; Caeli McKay	Canada
bronze medal	Leong Mun Yee; Nur Dhabitah Sabri	Malaysia

The women's synchronised 10 metre platform was part of the Diving at the 2018 Commonwealth Games program. The competition was held on 11 April 2018 at Gold Coast Aquatic Centre in Gold Coast.

== Format ==
A single round was held, with each team making five dives. Eleven judges scored each dive: three for each diver, and five for synchronisation. Only the middle score counted for each diver, with the middle three counting for synchronization. These five scores were averaged, multiplied by 3, and multiplied by the dive's degree of difficulty to give a total dive score. The scores for each of the five dives were summed to give a final score.

== Schedule ==
All times are Australian Eastern Standard Time (UTC+10).

Date	Start	Round
April 11	21:29	Finals

== Results ==
Results:

Rank	Nation	Dives					Total
Rank	Nation	1	2	3	4	5	Total
1st place, gold medalist(s)	Malaysia; Cheong Jun Hoong; Pandelela Rinong	52.80	53.40	70.20	76.80	74.88	328.08
2nd place, silver medalist(s)	Canada; Meaghan Benfeito; Caeli McKay	48.00	49.80	68.40	72.96	72.96	312.12
3rd place, bronze medalist(s)	Malaysia; Leong Mun Yee; Nur Dhabitah Sabri	49.80	46.80	66.60	70.08	74.88	308.16
4	Australia; Teju Williamson; Melissa Wu	48.60	49.80	70.20	70.08	69.12	307.80
5	England; Robin Birch; Lois Toulson	45.60	46.80	57.60	62.40	70.08	282.48
6	Australia; Annarose Keating; Brittany O'Brien	43.80	45.00	64.35	49.92	70.08	273.15
