= Swimming at the 2018 Commonwealth Games – Women's 200 metre individual medley =

Women's 200 metre individual medley at the 2018 Commonwealth Games
- Venue: Gold Coast Aquatic Centre
- Dates: 8 April
- Competitors: 16 from 9 nations
- Winning time: 2:09.80

Medalists
gold medal	Siobhan-Marie O'Connor	England
silver medal	Sarah Darcel	Canada
bronze medal	Erika Seltenreich-Hodgson	Canada

The women's 200 metre individual medley event at the 2018 Commonwealth Games was held on 8 April at the Gold Coast Aquatic Centre.

== Records ==
Prior to this competition, the existing world, Commonwealth and Games records were as follows:

World record	Katinka Hosszú (HUN)	2:06.12	Kazan, Russia	3 August 2015
Commonwealth record	Siobhan-Marie O'Connor (GBR)	2:06.88	Rio de Janeiro, Brazil	9 August 2016
Games record	Siobhan-Marie O'Connor (ENG)	2:08.21	Glasgow, United Kingdom	27 July 2014

== Results ==
=== Heats ===
The heats were held at 11:25.

Rank	Heat	Lane	Name	Nationality	Time	Notes
1	2	4	Siobhan-Marie O'Connor	England	2:11.31	Q
2	1	4	Erika Seltenreich-Hodgson	Canada	2:12.24	Q
3	2	5	Hannah Miley	Scotland	2:12.50	Q
4	1	3	Abbie Wood	England	2:12.85	Q
5	2	3	Sarah Darcel	Canada	2:12.95	Q
6	1	5	Aimee Willmott	England	2:13.38	Q
7	1	2	Meg Bailey	Australia	2:13.61	Q
8	1	6	Blair Evans	Australia	2:13.63	Q
9	2	6	Kayla Sanchez	Canada	2:14.07	
10	2	2	Taylor McKeown	Australia	2:15.77	
11	2	1	Emily Visagie	South Africa	2:18.27	
12	1	7	Niamh Robinson	Isle of Man	2:19.62	
13	2	7	Marlies Ross	South Africa	2:19.67	
14	1	1	Matelita Buadromo	Fiji	2:24.76	
15	1	8	Alania Suttie	Samoa	2:30.23	
16	2	8	Aaliyah Palestrini	Seychelles	2:36.25	

=== Final ===
The final was held at 21:24.

Rank	Lane	Name	Nationality	Time	Notes
1st place, gold medalist(s)	4	Siobhan-Marie O'Connor	England	2:09.80	
2nd place, silver medalist(s)	2	Sarah Darcel	Canada	2:11.14	
3rd place, bronze medalist(s)	5	Erika Seltenreich-Hodgson	Canada	2:11.74	
4	7	Aimee Willmott	England	2:12.07	
5	8	Blair Evans	Australia	2:12.76	
6	3	Hannah Miley	Scotland	2:13.29	
7	6	Abbie Wood	England	2:13.72	
8	1	Meg Bailey	Australia	2:14.58	
