= Diving at the 2018 Commonwealth Games – Women's 3 metre springboard =

Women's 3 metre springboard at the 2018 Commonwealth Games
- Venue: Gold Coast Aquatic Centre
- Date: 14 April
- Competitors: 15
- Winning score: 366.95

Medalists
gold medal	Jennifer Abel	Canada
silver medal	Maddison Keeney	Australia
bronze medal	Anabelle Smith	Australia

The women's 3 metre springboard was part of the Diving at the 2018 Commonwealth Games program. The competition was held on 14 April 2018 at Gold Coast Aquatic Centre in Gold Coast.

== Format ==
The competition was held in two rounds:

- Preliminary round: All 15 divers perform five dives; the top 12 divers advance to the final.
- Final: The 12 divers perform five dives; the preliminary round scores are erased and the top three divers win the gold, silver and bronze medals accordingly.

== Schedule ==
All times are Australian Eastern Standard Time (UTC+10).

Date	Start	Round
14 April	10:07	Preliminary
14 April	19:07	Finals

== Results ==
Results:

Green denotes finalists

Rank	Diver	Preliminary		Final	
Rank	Diver	Points	Rank	Points	Rank
1st place, gold medalist(s)	Jennifer Abel (CAN)	315.80	3	366.95	1
2nd place, silver medalist(s)	Maddison Keeney (AUS)	302.50	6	366.55	2
3rd place, bronze medalist(s)	Anabelle Smith (AUS)	272.85	8	336.90	3
4	Pamela Ware (CAN)	318.45	2	330.60	4
5	Esther Qin (AUS)	332.10	1	294.60	5
6	Julia Vincent (RSA)	229.50	11	291.45	6
7	Katherine Torrance (ENG)	305.85	4	286.05	7
8	Alicia Blagg (ENG)	287.35	7	282.40	8
9	Grace Reid (SCO)	305.15	5	282.00	9
10	Kimberly Bong (MAS)	223.75	12	270.10	10
11	Nur Dhabitah Sabri (MAS)	243.30	9	264.90	11
12	Elizabeth Cui (NZL)	241.20	10	247.10	12
13	Nicole Gillis (RSA)	221.15	13	did not advance	
14	Micaela Bouter (RSA)	213.70	14	did not advance	
15	Jasmine Lai (MAS)	202.80	15	did not advance	
