= Diving at the 2018 Commonwealth Games – Women's 10 metre platform =

Woman's diving competition

Women's 10 metre platform at the 2018 Commonwealth Games
- Venue: Gold Coast Aquatic Centre
- Date: 12 April
- Competitors: 12 from 5 nations
- Winning score: 360.40

Medalists
| gold medal | Melissa Wu | Australia |
| silver medal | Meaghan Benfeito | Canada |
| bronze medal | Lois Toulson | England |

The women's 10 metre platform was part of the Diving at the 2018 Commonwealth Games program. The competition was held on 12 April 2018 at Gold Coast Aquatic Centre in Gold Coast.

== Format ==
The competition was held in two rounds:

- Preliminary round: All 12 divers perform five dives; total scores determine the starting order in final.
- Final: The 12 divers perform five dives; the preliminary round scores are erased and the top three divers win the gold, silver and bronze medals accordingly.

== Schedule ==
All times are Australian Eastern Standard Time (UTC+10).

| Date | Start | Round |
|---|---|---|
| 12 April | 10:04 | Preliminary |
| 12 April | 19:14 | Finals |

== Results ==
Results:

| Rank | Diver | Preliminary | | Final | |
| Rank | Diver | Points | Rank | Points | Rank |
|---|---|---|---|---|---|
| 1st place, gold medalist(s) | Melissa Wu (AUS) | 327.20 | 3 | 360.40 | 1 |
| 2nd place, silver medalist(s) | Meaghan Benfeito (CAN) | 314.75 | 6 | 359.75 | 2 |
| 3rd place, bronze medalist(s) | Lois Toulson (ENG) | 324.60 | 4 | 344.20 | 3 |
| 4 | Pandelela Rinong (MAS) | 339.00 | 1 | 340.20 | 4 |
| 5 | Cheong Jun Hoong (MAS) | 330.10 | 2 | 332.85 | 5 |
| 6 | Caeli McKay (CAN) | 277.70 | 10 | 325.90 | 6 |
| 7 | Brittany O'Brien (AUS) | 304.75 | 7 | 322.50 | 7 |
| 8 | Robyn Birch (ENG) | 319.50 | 5 | 308.40 | 8 |
| 9 | Celina Toth (CAN) | 289.80 | 9 | 300.85 | 9 |
| 10 | Kimberly Qian Bong (MAS) | 204.20 | 12 | 294.20 | 10 |
| 11 | Teju Williamson (AUS) | 293.80 | 8 | 276.35 | 11 |
| 12 | Gemma McArthur (SCO) | 273.15 | 11 | 263.05 | 12 |
