= Sarah Darcel =

Canadian swimmer (born 1999)

Personal information
- Born: 25 May 1999 (age 27)

Sport
- Sport: Swimming
Medal record
Representing Canada
Commonwealth Games
Silver medal – second place	2018 Gold Coast	200 m individual medley
Junior Pan Pacific Championships
Gold medal – first place	2016 Maui	400 m medley
Silver medal – second place	2016 Maui	4×100 m freestyle
Silver medal – second place	2016 Maui	4×100 m medley

Sarah Darcel (born 25 May 1999) is a Canadian swimmer. She competed in the women's 200 metre individual medley at the 2018 Commonwealth Games, winning the silver medal.
