= Tristan Smyth =

Canadian Paralympic athlete

Personal information
- Born: May 31, 1986 (age 40) Lake Country, British Columbia

Sport
- Country: Canada
- Sport: Paralympic athletics
- Disability class: T54
Medal record
Paralympic athletics
Representing Canada
Paralympic Games
Bronze medal – third place	2016 Rio de Janeiro	400m T54

Tristan Smyth (born May 31, 1986) is a Canadian Paralympic athlete who competes in the T54 category. Smith represented his home country at the 2016 Summer Paralympics, where he won the bronze medal in the Men's 4 × 400 metres relay.

== Early life ==
Smyth was born on May 31, 1986, to Jonathan and Anneke Smyth in Richmond, British Columbia. He spent his first seven years there before his family relocated to Maple Ridge. While he was born without a physical disability, Smyth became partially paralyzed after breaking his back in January 2011. While recovering, he grew interested in Parasports, specifically wheelchair basketball and track and field. During his rehabilitation at G. F. Strong Centre, Smyth was approached by the B.C. Wheelchair Sports Association.

== Career ==
Following his four months in rehabilitation, Smyth began playing wheelchair basketball at Douglas College and track and field at the Richmond Olympic Oval. During this time, his coach introduced Smyth to Paralympic medalist Kelly Smith and they began training together. By August 2011, Smyth was competing at the Western Canada Summer Games and won a gold medal in the 400-metre, 200-metre, and 1,500-metre events. He won another gold medal at the 1,500-metre event and a silver medal in the 400-metre at the 2013 Western Canada Summer Games. After qualifying for Team Canada at the 2016 Summer Paralympics, Smyth competed in the 400m T54 relay and won a bronze medal alongside his teammates Brent Lakatos, Curtis Thom, and Alex Dupont.
