= James Connor (diver) =

Australian diver

Personal information
- Born: 5 May 1995 (age 31) Clayton, Victoria
- Height: 177 cm (5 ft 10 in)
- Weight: 68 kg (150 lb)

Sport
- Country: Australia
- Event: 10 m
- Club: Gannets Diving Club
Medal record
Men's diving
Representing Australia
Commonwealth Games
Silver medal – second place	2018 Gold Coast	1 m springboard
Bronze medal – third place	2018 Gold Coast	3 m springboard

James Connor (born 5 May 1995) is an Australian diver.

He competed at the 2012 Summer Olympics in the Men's 10 metre platform event, failing to advance to the semi-finals after classifying 20th in the preliminaries.

James began his diving career at the age of 8, at the Ringwood Aquatic Centre, and is a member of the Gannets Diving Club.

His more notable results include a gold medal at the 2011 Australian Swimming Championships in the 10 m synchro event with his partner Ethan Warren; as well as becoming a centurion at the Rage in 2017. He also won a silver in the 3 m synchro and a bronze in the 3 m individual springboard on the same occasion. Connor also participated in the 2010 Commonwealth Games where he finished 9th in the 10 metre platform. James also won first place in the 10m platform at the 2009 British Elite Junior Championships, and second in the 3m springboard at the same event.

== See also ==
- List of Caulfield Grammar School people
