= Adam Thoseby =

Australian basketball player

Personal information
- Born: 25 November 1991 (age 34) Melbourne, Victoria, Australia
- Listed height: 197 cm (6 ft 6 in)
- Listed weight: 93 kg (205 lb)

Career information
- High school: Maine Central Institute (Pittsfield, Maine)
- College: Utah State (2011–2012); South Dakota (2013–2015); GSW State (2015–2016)
- NBA draft: 2016: undrafted
- Playing career: 2009–present
- Position: Shooting guard / small forward

Career history
- 2009–2010: Reading Rockets
- 2017: Knox Raiders
- 2017–2018: Sydney Kings
- 2018–2019: Worcester Wolves
- 2019: Knox Raiders
- 2020: Basketball Löwen
- 2020–2021: Traiskirchen Lions
- 2021: Knox Raiders
- 2022: Perry Lakes Hawks
- 2023: Ballarat Miners
- 2023–2024: Ehingen Urspring
- 2024: Casey Cavaliers
- 2025–2026: Diamond Valley Eagles
- 2026: Warrandyte Venom

Career highlights
- Big V All-Star Five (2017); Third-team All-PBC (2016)

Adam Nathan Campbell Thoseby (born 25 November 1991) is a British-Australian professional basketball player who last played for the Warrandyte Venom of the Big V. Born in Australia, Thoseby grew up in England and began playing for the Reading Rockets in 2009–10 before moving to the United States. He played college basketball between 2011 and 2016 for Utah State, South Dakota and Georgia Southwestern State. He played in the Australian National Basketball League (NBL) for the Sydney Kings in 2017–18 and the British Basketball League (BBL) for the Worcester Wolves in 2018–19. He played in Germany and Austria over the next two years before returning to Australia.

Thoseby has represented both the England and Great Britain national basketball teams and is a joint British-Australian passport holder.

== Early life and career ==
Born in Melbourne, Victoria, Thoseby moved to England with his British mother at the age of nine. He grew up in Henley-on-Thames and played junior basketball for the Reading Rockets in nearby Reading.

Thoseby debuted for the Reading Rockets in the English Basketball League (EBL) during the 2009–10 season. He averaged 8.8 points in 19 games.

In 2010, Thoseby moved to United States to attend prep school at Maine Central Institute in Pittsfield, Maine. During the 2010–11 season, he helped the Huskies to a 20–11 record and the New England Preparatory School Athletic Council (NEPSAC) Class AAA title. He averaged 7.3 points, 1.4 rebounds and 1.1 assists per game and scored a season-high 21 points.

== College career ==
In June 2011, Thoseby signed a National Letter of Intent to play college basketball for Utah State.

As a freshman with the Aggies in 2011–12, Thoseby played in 28 of the team's 37 games and made two starts. He averaged 1.6 points in 8.0 minutes per game. He scored a season-high 16 points against Idaho State on 26 November 2011.

In July 2012, Thoseby transferred to South Dakota. He subsequently sat out the 2012–13 season due to NCAA transfer rules.

As a sophomore in 2013–14, Thoseby played in all 30 games for the Coyotes and started the first 11 at small forward. He averaged 7.7 points and 2.3 rebounds in 18 minutes per game. He had 12 double-digit scoring performances including a season-best 16 points against Kansas State on 10 December 2013 and against Omaha on 20 February 2014.

As a junior in 2014–15, Thoseby played in 25 of the Coyotes' 33 games and averaged 2.2 points in 5.7 minutes per game. He scored a then career-high 18 points against Wofford on 22 November 2014.

Thoseby transferred to Georgia Southwestern State of the NCAA Division II in 2015 after graduating from South Dakota with an undergraduate degree in computer science. He led the Hurricanes in scoring at 15.3 points per game, starting all 26 contests in which he appeared in during the 2015–16 season. He scored 20 or more points on seven occasions, including a career-high 34 points against Columbus State on 7 January 2016, and 31 against Francis Marion on 13 February. He was named the Peach Belt Conference (PBC) Player of the Week on 15 February. He was a third-team All-PBC selection and was named to the PBC All-Academic team after holding a 3.67 GPA while majoring in computer science.

== Professional career ==
After attempting to pick up a deal in Europe, Thoseby returned to Australia in 2017 to play in the Big V for the Knox Raiders. In 22 games, he averaged 18.1 points, 3.2 rebounds and 1.4 assists per game. He was subsequently named to the Big V All-Star Five.

On 11 August 2017, Thoseby signed with the Sydney Kings of the Australian National Basketball League (NBL) for the 2017–18 season. He averaged 1.1 points in 18 games for the Kings.

On 22 August 2018, Thoseby signed with the Worcester Wolves of the British Basketball League (BBL) for the 2018–19 season. In 26 games, he averaged 10.8 points, 3.2 rebounds and 1.7 assists per game.

Thoseby re-joined the Knox Raiders, now in the NBL1, for the 2019 season. In 19 games, he averaged 14.4 points, 2.9 rebounds and 1.6 assists per game.

In January 2020, Thoseby moved to Germany to play for Basketball Löwen of the ProB. He quickly became the team's top scorer, averaging of 25.8 points in his first six games. In eight games during the 2019–20 season, he averaged 24.6 points, 4.8 rebounds, 2.3 assists and 1.8 steals per game.

In August 2020, Thoseby signed with Traiskirchen Lions of the Austrian Basketball Superliga for the 2020–21 season. In February 2021, he was ruled out for the rest of the season with an injury.

In April 2021, Thoseby returned to the Knox Raiders of the NBL1 South and played three games during the 2021 NBL1 season.

On 1 February 2022, Thoseby signed with the Perry Lakes Hawks of the NBL1 West for the 2022 season. He parted ways with the Hawks on 22 June 2022. In 11 games, he averaged 16.27 points, 2.81 rebounds and 1.72 assists per game.

On 3 February 2023, Thoseby signed with the Ballarat Miners for the 2023 NBL1 South season.

On 3 November 2023, Thoseby signed with Ehingen Urspring of the ProB for the rest of the 2023–24 season.

On 17 February 2024, Thoseby signed with the Casey Cavaliers for the 2024 NBL1 South season.

On 6 March 2025, Thoseby signed with the Diamond Valley Eagles for the 2025 NBL1 South season. On 26 February 2026, he re-signed with the Eagles for the 2026 season. He appeared in two games for the Eagles in March 2026 before joining the Warrandyte Venom of the Big V in May 2026.

== National team career ==
As of 2015, Thoseby had represented England or Great Britain in international basketball approximately 40 times. During the summer of 2011, he played for Great Britain's Under 20 basketball team that participated in the European Championships. He averaged 8.9 points per game in the tournament. In 2018, he played for England at the Commonwealth Games on the Gold Coast. He averaged 14.5 points per game in the tournament.

== Personal life ==
Thoseby is the son of Andrew Thoseby and Sue Baker.

Thoseby holds Australian and British citizenship and has both joint British and Australian passports.
