= Robert Pitcairn (athlete) =

Canadian athlete (1938–2022)

Robert Pitcairn (26 June 1938 – 4 March 2022) was a Canadian athlete who competed in full bore shooting events. Raised in Summerside, PEI, he later settled in Chilliwack, BC. He was the oldest competitor to ever make their debut at a Commonwealth Games event. Pitcairn competed at the age of 79 years and 9 months on 9 April 2018. He was a pilot in the Royal Canadian Air Force and a retired commercial airline pilot.

== Career ==
Pitcairn was introduced to shooting as an Air Force cadet in 1960 but could not dedicate the time to compete properly until his retirement in 1998. He won several provincial, national and international awards as a fullbore rifle shooter. He trained in preparation for the 2002 Commonwealth Games but narrowly missed out in qualification and did not make his Commonwealth debut until the 2018 Games alongside teammate Nicole Rossignol. They competed in the Queen's Prize event. Pitcairn was the highest scorer at both 900 and 1,000 yards but the pair only managed to secure eighth overall.

During his career as a commercial airline pilot Pitcairn made headlines when, on 29 November 1974, he foiled a hijack attempt on the Boeing 737 he was piloting. Carrying 120 passengers on CP Air Flight 71, Pitcairn was flying from Montreal to Edmonton when a passenger held a knife to the throat of an air hostess and demanded to be taken to Cyprus. Having received training on how to approach hijack situations Pitcairn told the assailant that he would need to land the plane in Saskatoon in order to refuel for the journey. The plane landed and the Royal Canadian Mounted Police took the hijacker into custody.

Pitcairn's son, Donald Pitcairn, is also a sport shooter and both father and son competed at the 2011 and 2015 World Long Range Rifle Championships. Pitcairn died on 4 March 2022, at the age of 83.
