= Conor Morgan =

Canadian basketball player (born 1994)

- Morgan with Beşiktaş in 2026

No. 9 – Beşiktaş Fuzul
- Position: Power forward / center
- League: Basketbol Süper Ligi

Personal information
- Born: 3 August 1994 (age 32) Victoria, British Columbia, Canada
- Listed height: 6 ft 9 in (2.06 m)
- Listed weight: 220 lb (100 kg)

Career information
- High school: Mount Douglas Secondary School (Saanich, British Columbia)
- College: UBC (2012–2018)
- NBA draft: 2017: undrafted
- Playing career: 2017–present

Career history
- 2017–2018: Southland Sharks
- 2018–2021: Joventut Badalona
- 2019: Fraser Valley Bandits
- 2021–2022: MoraBanc Andorra
- 2022–2023: Śląsk Wrocław
- 2023: Bahçeşehir Koleji
- 2023–2024: London Lions
- 2024–present: Beşiktaş

Career highlights
- New Zealand NBL champion (2018)
Medals
Representing Canada
Men's basketball
Commonwealth Games
Silver medal – second place	2018 Gold Coast	Team competition

Conor Morgan (born 3 August 1994) is an Irish-Canadian professional basketball player for Beşiktaş of the Basketbol Süper Ligi (BSL). He also plays for the Canadian national team.

== College career ==
Morgan played college basketball for the Canadian team UBC Thunderbirds representing the University of British Columbia, in his senior season he averaged 23.9 points and 9.7 rebounds per game.

== Professional career ==
Morgan started his professional career with the New Zealand side Southland Sharks in 2017, he averaged 15.61 points, 5.56 rebounds and 3 assists at the club and he won the New Zealand pro league championship with the team also. He signed a two-year deal with the Spanish side Joventut Badalona in 2018, In the 2018–19 season, he averaged 6.6 points, 2.2 rebounds and 0.4 assist. In the 2019–20 season, he averaged 9.1 points and 3.3 rebounds per game. On 6 June 2020, he signed a one-year contract extension with an option for an additional year. Morgan parted ways with the team in June 2021.

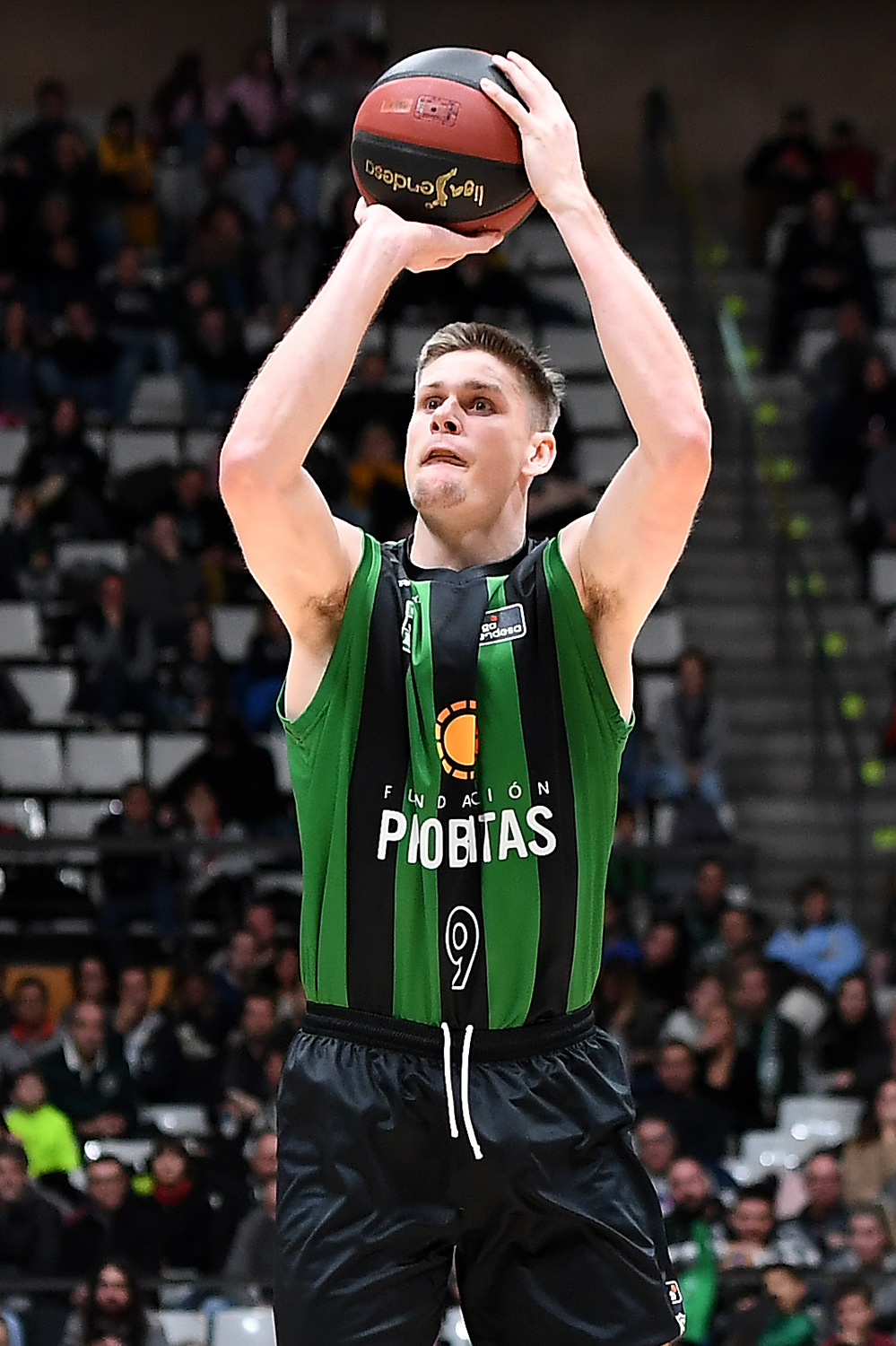
Morgan with Joventut in 2018

On June 30, 2021, he signed with MoraBanc Andorra of the Liga ACB.

On 14 August 2022, he signed with Śląsk Wrocław of the PLK.

On 5 February 2023, he signed with Bahçeşehir Koleji of the Turkish Basketball Super League (BSL).

On 19 July 2023, he signed with London Lions of the British Basketball League.

On 28 June 2024, Morgan signed with Beşiktaş Fibabanka of the Basketbol Süper Ligi (BSL).

== National team career ==
Morgan was a member of the silver medal winning Canadian national basketball team at the 2018 Commonwealth Games. Morgan also represented the Canada at the 2019 FIBA Basketball World Cup in China, where he averaged 6.3 points, 2.3 rebound and 0.3 assists per game.
