= Jean-Victor Mukama =

Canadian-Rwandan basketball player (born 1994)

Patriots
- Position: Small forward / power forward
- League: Rwanda Basketball League

Personal information
- Born: August 24, 1994 (age 32) Canada
- Listed height: 2.03 m (6 ft 8 in)
- Listed weight: 91 kg (201 lb)

Career information
- High school: Academie Catholique Mere-Teresa (Hamilton, Ontario)
- College: Ryerson (2013–2019)
- NBA draft: 2019: undrafted
- Playing career: 2019–present

Career history
- 2019: Patriots
- 2020: Hamilton Honey Badgers
- 2020–2021: Aris Leeuwarden
- 2021: Melilla
- 2022: Scarborough Shooting Stars
- 2023: Patriots
- 2023–2024: REG
- 2024–present: APR BBC

Career highlights
- All-CEBL First Team (2020)
Medals
Men's basketball
Representing Canada
Commonwealth Games
Silver medal – second place	2018 Gold Coast	Team

Jean-Victor "JV" Mukama (born August 24, 1994) is a Canadian-Rwandan professional basketball player. Standing at 203 cm (6 ft 8 in), he is a versatile forward.

== Career ==
In October 2019, Mukama had a try-out with Raptors 905 and was added to the roster but was released before playing a game.

In December 2019, Mukama signed with Patriots BBC in Rwanda to play in the 2020 BAL Qualifying Tournaments. He helped the team qualify for the inaugural BAL season. In the final of the qualifying tournament against GNBC, Mukama scored a game-high 18 points.

In July 2020, Mukama played for the Hamilton Honey Badgers in the Canadian 2020 CEBL season. He averaged 14.1 points and 6.3 rebounds, helping his team reach the semifinals.

In August 2020, Mukama signed a one-year contract with Aris Leeuwarden of the Dutch Basketball League (DBL). On March 26, 2021, Aris announced Mukama suffered from an injury that would keep him out the remainder of the season. Both sides mutually agreed for Mukama to leave the team.

In October 2021, Mukama joined Melilla of the Spanish LEB Oro. On 16 December, his contract with the team was disbanded on his request for personal reasons. In six games he averaged 5.2 points, 2.3 rebounds and 1.5 assists per game.

On February 12, 2022, Mukama signed with REG for the 2022 BAL season.

On May 3, 2022, Mukama signed with the Scarborough Shooting Stars of the CEBL.

For the 2022–23 season, Mukama was added to the training camp roster of Raptors 905. However, he did not make the final roster.

In August 2023, he returned to Patriots BBC for a second stint.

== National team career ==
In November 2020, Mukama was selected for the Rwanda national basketball team for the qualifying games for the 2021 AfroBasket.

== Personal life ==
Born in Quebec, Mukama relocated to his family's homeland of Rwanda in 2003, spending four years before moving back to Canada and settling in Hamilton, Ontario.
