= Alex Dupont (athlete) =

Canadian wheelchair racer

Personal information
- Full name: Alexandre Dupont
- Nationality: Canadian
- Born: 3 September 1985 (age 40)

Sport
- Sport: Wheelchair racing
- Disability class: T54
Medal record
Para-athletics
Representing Canada
Paralympic Games
Bronze medal – third place	2016 Rio de Janeiro	4 x 400 m T53-54
World Championships
Gold medal – first place	2013 Lyon	4x400 m relay T53-54
Bronze medal – third place	2011 Christchurch	4x400 m relay T53-54
Parapan American Games
Gold medal – first place	2015 Toronto	400 m (T54)
Gold medal – first place	2015 Toronto	800 m (T54)
Gold medal – first place	2015 Toronto	1500 m (T54)
Commonwealth Games
Gold medal – first place	2018 Gold Coast	1500 m (T54)
Bronze medal – third place	2014 Glasgow	1500 m (T54)

Alexandre "Alex" Dupont (born 3 September 1985) is a Canadian wheelchair racer. His right leg was amputated after he had a motorcycle accident when he was 17; he took up racing at the age of 18. Classified as a T54 athlete, he won bronze in the 1500 m at the 2014 Commonwealth Games in Glasgow.
