= Singapore at the 2018 Commonwealth Games =

- Flag of Singapore
- CG code: SGP
- CGA: Singapore National Olympic Council
- Website: www.singaporeolympics.com

in Gold Coast, Australia 4 April 2018 – 15 April 2018
- Competitors: 59 in 11 sports
- Flag bearer: Teo Shun Xie
- Medals Ranked 13th: Gold 5 Silver 2 Bronze 2 Total 9

Commonwealth Games appearances (overview)
- 1958; 1962; 1966; 1970; 1974; 1978; 1982; 1986; 1990; 1994; 1998; 2002; 2006; 2010; 2014; 2018; 2022; 2026; 2030

Singapore competed at the 2018 Commonwealth Games in Gold Coast, Australia from April 4 to April 15, 2018.

Singapore's team consists of 59 athletes competing in 11 sports (including four para-sport competitors). The country also made its Commonwealth Games debut in beach volleyball (the sport also made its debut) and lawn bowls.

Sport shooter Teo Shun Xie was the country's flag bearer during the opening ceremony.

== Medalists ==
Medal	Name	Sport	Event	Date
Gold	Martina Veloso	Shooting	Women's 10 m Air Rifle	April 9
Gold	Martina Veloso	Shooting	Women's 50 m Rifle Prone	April 12
Gold	Feng Tianwei; Yu Mengyu	Table tennis	Women's doubles	April 13
Gold	Gao Ning; Yu Mengyu	Table tennis	Mixed doubles	April 15
Gold	Gao Ning	Table tennis	Men's singles	April 15
Silver	Feng Tianwei; Lin Ye; Yu Mengyu; Wanling Zhang; Zhou Yihan	Table tennis	Women's Team	April 8
Silver	Yu Mengyu	Table tennis	Women's Singles	April 14
Bronze	Toh Wei Soong	Swimming	Men's 50 m Freestyle S7	April 9
Bronze	Feng Tianwei	Table tennis	Women's Singles	April 14

== Competitors ==
The following is the list of number of competitors participating at the Games per sport/discipline.

Sport	Men	Women	Total
Athletics	0	1	2
Badminton	5	5	10
Beach volleyball	0	2	2
Cycling	0	1	1
Diving	1	0	1
Gymnastics	4	2	6
Lawn bowls	4	0	4
Powerlifting	1	0	1
Shooting	10	7	17
Swimming	3	2	5
Table tennis	5	5	10
Weightlifting	1	0	1
Total	34	25	59

== Athletics ==
Women
Field events

Athlete	Event	Final	
Athlete	Event	Distance	Rank
Rachel Yang	Pole vault	3.50	14

== Badminton ==
Singapore participated with ten athletes (five men and five women)

Singles

Athlete	Event	Round of 64	Round of 32	Round of 16	Quarterfinal	Semifinal	Final / BM	
Athlete	Event	Opposition Score	Opposition Score	Opposition Score	Opposition Score	Opposition Score	Opposition Score	Rank
Loh Kean Yew	Men's singles	von Bodenstein (RSA); W 2 - 0	Merrilees (SCO); W 2 - 1	Yang (CAN); W 2 - 0	Lee (MAS); L 0 - 2	did not advance		
Ryan Ng	Men's singles	BYE	Mohammed (TTO); W 2 - 0	Goonethilleka (SRI); W 2 - 1	Kidambi (IND); L 0 - 2	did not advance		
Grace Chua	Women's singles	March (FAI); W 2 - 0	Butler-Emmett (RSA); W 2 - 0	Cheah (MAS); L 0 - 2	did not advance			
Yeo Jia Min	Women's singles	Gibson (FIJ); W 2 - 0	Bangi (UGA); W W/O	Gadde (IND); L 1 - 2	did not advance			

Doubles

Athlete	Event	Round of 64	Round of 32	Round of 16	Quarterfinal	Semifinal	Final / BM	
Athlete	Event	Opposition Score	Opposition Score	Opposition Score	Opposition Score	Opposition Score	Opposition Score	Rank
Danny Bawa Chrisnanta; Terry Hee	Men's doubles	—N/a	Fong (FIJ); Molia (FIJ); W 2 - 0	Chau (AUS); Serasinghe (AUS); W 2 - 0	Ellis (ENG); Langridge (ENG); L 0 - 2	did not advance		
Crystal Wong; Ren-ne Ong	Women's doubles	—N/a	Veeran (AUS); Choo (AUS); W 2 - 1	Ponnappa (IND); Reddy (IND); L 0 - 2	did not advance			
Terry Hee; Tan Wei Han	Mixed doubles	BYE	Vijayanath (RSA); Svholtz (RSA); W 2 - 0	Dias (SRI); Hendadewa (SRI); W 2 - 0	Ellis (ENG); Smith (ENG); L 0 - 2	did not advance		
Danny Bawa Chrisnanta; Crystal Wong	Mixed doubles	Sam (GHA); Migbodzi (GHA); W 2 - 0	van Bodenstein (RSA) de Villiers (RSA); W 2 - 0	Chopra (IND); Reddy (IND); L 0 - 2	did not advance			
Jason Wong; Ren-ne Ong	Mixed doubles	Bignell (JER); Redshaw (JER); W 2 - 0	Baah (GHA); Atipaka (GHA); W 2 - 0	C Adcock (ENG); G Adcock (ENG); L 0 - 2	did not advance			

Mixed team

Roster

- Danny Bawa Chrisnanta
- Grace Chua
- Terry Hee
- Loh Kean Yew
- Ryan Ng
- Ren-ne Ong
- Tan Wei Han
- Jason Wong
- Crystal Wong
- Yeo Jia Min

Pool B

Pos	Team	Pld	W	L	MF	MA	MD	GF	GA	GD	PF	PA	PD	Pts	Qualification
1	Singapore	3	3	0	15	0	+15	30	0	+30	630	308	+322	3	Knockout stage
2	Mauritius	3	2	1	10	5	+5	20	13	+7	603	542	+61	2	Knockout stage
3	Jamaica	3	1	2	5	10	−5	13	23	−10	540	675	−135	1	
4	Zambia	3	0	3	0	15	−15	3	30	−27	435	683	−248	0	

Source: GC2018

Singapore
5
Carrara Sports and Leisure Centre, Gold Coast
5 April

Jamaica
0

			1	2	3
1	(Singapore) (Jamaica)	Terry Hee / Crystal Wong; Dennis Coke / Katherine Wynter	21; 9	21; 9
2	(Singapore) (Jamaica)	Ryan Ng; Samuel Ricketts	21; 16	21; 10
3	(Singapore) (Jamaica)	Grace Chua; Alana Bailey	21; 4	21; 6
4	(Singapore) (Jamaica)	Jason Wong / Danny Bawa Chrisnanta; Dennis Coke / Anthony McNee	21; 16	21; 12
5	(Singapore) (Jamaica)	Ren-ne Ong / Crystal Wong; Alana Bailey / Katherine Wynter	21; 3	21; 6

Singapore
5
Carrara Sports and Leisure Centre, Gold Coast
5 April

Zambia
0

			1	2	3
1	(Singapore) (Zambia)	Jason Wong / Ren-ne Ong; Kalombo Mulenga / Ogar Siamupangila	21; 10	21; 10
2	(Singapore) (Zambia)	Ryan Ng; Chongo Mulenga	21; 14	21; 11
3	(Singapore) (Zambia)	Grace Chua; Evelyn Siamupangila	21; 3	21; 2
4	(Singapore) (Zambia)	Tery Hee / Danny Bawa Chrisnanta; Kalombo Mulenga / Chongo Mulenga	21; 4	21; 18
5	(Singapore) (Zambia)	Ren-ne Ong / Crystal Wong; Ogar Siamupangila / Evelyn Siamupangila	21; 7	21; 9

Singapore
5
Carrara Sports and Leisure Centre, Gold Coast
6 April

Mauritius
0

			1	2	3
1	(Singapore) (Mauritius)	Terry Hee / Danny Bawa Chrisnanta; Aatish Lubah / Christopher Jean Paul	21; 13	21; 11
2	(Singapore) (Mauritius)	Yeo Jia Min; Kate Foo Kune	21; 15	21; 16
3	(Singapore) (Mauritius)	Loh Kean Yew; Julien Paul	21; 14	21; 15
4	(Singapore) (Mauritius)	Ren-ne Ong / Crystal Wong; Kate Foo Kune / Aurélie Allet	21; 9	21; 12
5	(Singapore) (Mauritius)	Terry Hee / Tan Wei Han; Aatish Lubah / Nicki Chan-Lam	21; 10	21; 14

Quarterfinals

Singapore
3
Carrara Sports and Leisure Centre, Gold Coast
7 April

Australia
0

			1	2	3
1	(Singapore) (Australia)	Terry Hee / Tan Wei Han; Matthew Chau / Setyana Mapasa	21; 17	18; 21	21; 16
2	(Singapore) (Australia)	Loh Kean Yew; Anthony Joe	21; 8	21; 6
3	(Singapore) (Australia)	Terry Hee / Danny Bawa Chrisnanta; Robin Middleton / Ross Smith	21; 15	21; 14
4	(Singapore) (Australia)	Yeo Jia Min; Wendy Chen				not played
5	(Singapore) (Australia)	Ren-ne Ong / Crystal Wong; Gronya Somerville / Setyana Mapasa				not played

Semifinals

India
3
Carrara Sports and Leisure Centre, Gold Coast
8 April

Singapore
1

			1	2	3
1	(India) (Singapore)	Satwiksairaj Rankireddy / Ashwini Ponnappa; Terry Hee / Crystal Wong	22; 20	21; 18
2	(India) (Singapore)	Srikanth Kidambi; Loh Kean Yew	21; 17	21; 14
3	(India) (Singapore)	Satwiksairaj Rankireddy / Chirag Shetty; Terry Hee / Danny Bawa Chrisnanta	21; 17	19; 21	12; 21
4	(India) (Singapore)	Saina Nehwal; Yeo Jia Min	21; 8	21; 15
5	(India) (Singapore)	Ashwini Ponnappa / N. Sikki Reddy; Ren-ne Ong / Crystal Wong				not played

Bronze Medal Match

Singapore
0
Carrara Sports and Leisure Centre, Gold Coast
9 April

England
3

			1	2	3
1	(Singapore) (England)	Terry Hee / Crystal Wong; Marcus Ellis / Lauren Smith	21; 16	19; 21	18; 21
2	(Singapore) (England)	Loh Kean Yew; Rajiv Ouseph	22; 20	15; 21	23; 25
3	(Singapore) (England)	Terry Hee / Danny Bawa Chrisnanta; Chris Langridge / Marcus Ellis	9; 21	21; 19	13; 21
4	(Singapore) (England)	Yeo Jia Min; Chloe Birch				not played
5	(Singapore) (England)	Ren-ne Ong / Crystal Wong; Lauren Smith / Sarah Walker				not played

== Beach volleyball ==
Singapore qualified a women's beach volleyball team for a total of two athletes.

Athlete	Event	Preliminary round	Standing	Quarterfinals	Semifinals	Final / BM	
Athlete	Event	Opposition Score	Standing	Opposition Score	Opposition Score	Opposition Score	Rank
Ee Shan Lau; Wei Yu Ong	Women's	Pool C Matauatu – Pata (VAN); L 0 - 2 (9 - 21, 12 - 21); Wills – Polley (NZL); L 0 - 2 (16 - 21, 5 - 21); Nzayisenga – Mutatsimpundu (RWA); L 0 - 2 (11 - 21, 20 - 22)	4	did not advance			

== Cycling ==
Singapore participated with 1 athlete (1 woman).

=== Track ===
Points race

Athlete	Event	Final	
Athlete	Event	Points	Rank
Yiwei Luo	Women's points race	0	18

Scratch race

Athlete	Event	Final
Yiwei Luo	Women's scratch race	19

== Diving ==
Singapore participated with a team of 1 athlete (1 man).

Men

Athlete	Event	Preliminaries		Final	
Athlete	Event	Points	Rank	Points	Rank
Mark Lee	1 m springboard	236.60	14	did not advance	
Mark Lee	3 m springboard	329.00	13	did not advance	

== Gymnastics ==
=== Artistic ===
Singapore participated with 5 athletes (4 men and 1 woman).

Men
Team Final & Individual Qualification

Athlete	Event	Apparatus						Total	Rank
Athlete	Event	F	PH	R	V	PB	HB	Total	Rank
Aizat Bin Muhammad Jufrie	Team	—N/a	9.800	10.300	12.700	—N/a	10.700	—N/a	
Wah Toon Hoe	Team	13.150	—N/a		12.700	11.350	—N/a	—N/a	
Timothy Tay	Team	10.375	10.500	10.850	13.200	10.850	10.800	66.575	27
Xong Sean Yeo	Team	12.400	12.650	9.800	13.150	12.150	11.650	71.800	24
Total	Team	35.925	32.950	30.950	39.050	34.350	33.150	206.375	8

Women
Individual Qualification

Athlete	Event	Apparatus				Total	Rank
Athlete	Event	V	UB	BB	F	Total	Rank
Colette Chan	Qualification	—N/a	10.200	—N/a		—N/a	

=== Rhythmic ===
Singapore participated with 1 athlete (1 woman).

Individual Qualification

Athlete	Event	Apparatus				Total	Rank
Athlete	Event	Hoop	Ball	Clubs	Ribbon	Total	Rank
Aiko Tan	Qualification	9.500	11.150	10.200	7.750	38.600	20 Q

Individual Finals

Athlete	Event	Apparatus				Total	Rank
Athlete	Event	Hoop	Ball	Clubs	Ribbon	Total	Rank
Aiko Tan	All-around	9.200	10.050	9.700	8.250	37.200	15

== Lawn bowls ==
Singapore will compete in Lawn bowls. This marked the Commonwealth Games debut for the country in the sport.

Athlete	Event	Group Stage					Quarterfinal	Semifinal	Final / BM	
Athlete	Event	Opposition Score	Opposition Score	Opposition Score	Opposition Score	Rank	Opposition Score	Opposition Score	Opposition Score	Rank
Meng Yin Foo; Anthony Loh; Heng Heck Pang	Men's Triples	New Zealand; L 6 - 28	Niue; W 24 - 12	Canada; L 12 - 13	Namibia; W 20 - 15	4	did not advance			
Meng Yin Foo; Anthony Loh; Heng Heck Pang; Melvin Tan	Men's Fours	England; L 6 - 25	Scotland; L 5 - 29	Brunei; L 9 - 11	—N/a	4	did not advance			

== Shooting ==
Singapore participated with 17 athletes (10 men and 7 women).

Men

Athlete	Event	Qualification		Final	
Athlete	Event	Points	Rank	Points	Rank
Wen Yi Abel Lim	50 metre rifle prone	605.1	17	did not advance	
Zhong Xian Lim	50 metre rifle prone	606.0	15	did not advance	
Emmanuel En Yue Chan	10 metre air rifle	612.3	12	did not advance	
Mohamad Irwan Rahman	10 metre air rifle	619.0	4 Q	119.9	8
Bin Gai	50 metre pistol	546	2 Q	143.1	6
Swee Hon Lim	50 metre pistol	534	8 Q	162.5	5
Swee Hon Lim	25 metre rapid fire pistol	531	11	did not advance	
Lip Meng Poh	25 metre rapid fire pistol	555	9	did not advance	
Bin Gai	10 metre air pistol	570	5 Q	133.9	7
Yu Hao Poh	10 metre air pistol	560	11	did not advance	
Choon Seng Choo	Trap	109	18	did not advance	
Hejun Lin	Trap	106	25	did not advance	

Women

Athlete	Event	Qualification		Final	
Athlete	Event	Points	Rank	Points	Rank
Jasmine Ser	50 metre rifle 3 positions	575	7 Q	408.8	6
Martina Veloso	50 metre rifle 3 positions	584	2 Q	432.3	4
Jasmine Ser	50 metre rifle prone	—N/a		615.6	5
Martina Veloso	50 metre rifle prone	—N/a		621.0	1st place, gold medalist(s)
Tessa Neo	10 metre air rifle	417.2	2 Q	57.3	8
Martina Veloso	10 metre air rifle	414.3	4 Q	247.2	1st place, gold medalist(s)
Ling Chiao Nicole Tan	25 metre pistol	569	9	did not advance	
Xiu Hong Teh	25 metre pistol	584	1 Q	19	5
Xiu Hong Teh	10 metre air pistol	373	8 Q	154.8	6
Teo Shun Xie	10 metre air pistol	377	4 Q	133.9	7
Siti Mastura Binte Rahim	Trap	60	12	did not advance	
Siti Mastura Binte Rahim	Double trap	—N/a		68	8

== Swimming ==
Singapore participated with 5 athletes (3 men and 2 women).

Men

Athlete	Event	Heat		Semifinal		Final	
Athlete	Event	Time	Rank	Time	Rank	Time	Rank
Liang Han	200 m freestyle S14	2:25.09	8 Q	—N/a		2:25.22	8
Darren Lim	50 m freestyle	23.50	25	did not advance			
Darren Lim	100 m freestyle	50.79	25	did not advance			
Darren Lim	50 m butterfly	24.86	20	did not advance			
Toh Wei Soong	50 m freestyle S7	30.35	3 Q	—N/a		29.83	3rd place, bronze medalist(s)

Women

Athlete	Event	Heat		Semifinal		Final	
Athlete	Event	Time	Rank	Time	Rank	Time	Rank
Roanne Ho	50 m breaststroke	31.61	11 Q	31.31	8 Q	31.32	8
Roanne Ho	100 m breaststroke	1:11.92	20	did not advance			
Quah Ting Wen	50 m freestyle	26.22	14 Q	26.25	14	did not advance	
Quah Ting Wen	100 m freestyle	57.46	16 Q	57.51	16	did not advance	
Quah Ting Wen	50 m butterfly	27.44	12 Q	27.35	12	did not advance	

== Table tennis ==
Singapore participated with 10 athletes (5 men and 5 women).

Singles

Athletes	Event	Group Stage			Round of 64	Round of 32	Round of 16	Quarterfinal	Semifinal	Final	Rank
Athletes	Event	Opposition Score	Opposition Score	Rank	Opposition Score	Opposition Score	Opposition Score	Opposition Score	Opposition Score	Opposition Score	Rank
Gao Ning	Men's singles	Bye				Howieson (SCO); W 4 - 0	Rizal (MAS); W 4 - 0	Wang (CAN); W 4 - 1	Walker (ENG); W 4 - 0	Aruna (NGR); W 4 - 2	1st place, gold medalist(s)
Xue Jie Pang	Men's singles	Bye				Tumaini (TAN); W 4 - 0	Aruna (NGR); L 1 - 4	did not advance			
Shao Feng Ethan Poh	Men's singles	Bye				McCreery (NIR); L 0 - 4	did not advance				
Feng Tianwei	Women's singles	Bye			—N/a	Bye	Tapper (AUS); W 4 - 0	Sibley (ENG); W 4 - 0	Batra (IND); L 3 - 4	Zhang (CAN); W 4 - 2	3rd place, bronze medalist(s)
Yu Mengyu	Women's singles	Bye			—N/a	Bye	Baah-Danso (GHA); W 4 - 0	Das (IND); W 4 - 1	Zhang (CAN); W 4 - 1	Batra (IND); L 0 - 4	2nd place, silver medalist(s)
Zhou Yihan	Women's singles	Bye			—N/a	Bye	Chang (MAS); W 4 - 3	Batra (IND); L 1 - 4	did not advance		

Doubles

Athletes	Event	Round of 64	Round of 32	Round of 16	Quarterfinal	Semifinal	Final	Rank
Athletes	Event	Opposition Score	Opposition Score	Opposition Score	Opposition Score	Opposition Score	Opposition Score	Rank
Yew En Koen Pang; Shao Feng Ethan Poh	Men's doubles	Bye	Powell / Townsend (AUS); W 3 - 0	Asante / Sam (GHA); W 3 - 0	Aruna / Toriola (NGR); W 3 - 1	Kamal / Gnanasekaran (IND); L 1 - 3	Desai / Shetty (IND); L 0 - 3	4
Gao Ning; Xue Jie Pang	Men's doubles	Bye	Taucoory / Yogarajah (MRI); W 3 - 0	Medjugorac / Wang (CAN); W 3 - 0	Drinkhall / Pitchford (ENG); L 2 - 3	did not advance		
Feng Tianwei; Yu Mengyu	Women's doubles	—N/a	Bye	Cummings / Lowe (GUY); W 3 - 0	Bromley / Tapper (AUS); W 3 - 0	Mukherjee / Sahasrabudhe (IND); W 3 - 0	Batra / Das (IND); W 3 - 0	1st place, gold medalist(s)
Lin Ye; Zhou Yihan	Women's doubles	—N/a	Bye	Lay / Miao (AUS); L 2 - 3	did not advance			
Wanling Zhang; Kun Ting Beh	Mixed doubles	Vae / Katepu (TUV); W 3 - 0	Pitchford / Ho (ENG); L 1 - 3	did not advance				
Yu Mengyu; Gao Ning	Mixed doubles	Bye	Bernadet / Yeung (CAN); W 3 - 1	Yan / Lay (AUS); W 3 - 2	Walker / Payet (ENG); W 3 - 0	Kamal / Das (IND); W 3 - 2	Pitchford / Ho (ENG); W 3 - 0	1st place, gold medalist(s)
Lin Ye; Shao Feng Ethan Poh	Mixed doubles	Bye	Britton / Greaves (GUY); W 3 - 0	Wang / Zhang (CAN); L 2 - 3	did not advance			
Zhou Yihan; Xue Jie Pang	Mixed doubles	Bye	St. Louis / Chung (TTO); W 3 - 2	Hu / Tapper (AUS); W 3 - 2	Gnanasekaran / Batra (IND); L 0 - 3	did not advance		

Team

Athletes	Event	Group Stage			Round of 16	Quarterfinal	Semifinal	Final	Rank
Athletes	Event	Opposition Score	Opposition Score	Rank	Opposition Score	Opposition Score	Opposition Score	Opposition Score	Rank
Kun Ting Beh; Gao Ning; Xue Jie Pang; Yew En Koen Pang; Shao Feng Ethan Poh	Men's team	Mauritius; W 3-0	Barbados; W 3-0	1 Q	Bye	Canada; W 3-2	India; L 2-3	England; L 0-3	4
Feng Tianwei; Lin Ye; YU Mengyu; Wanling Zhang; Zhou Yihan	Women's team	Malaysia; W 3-0	Fiji; W 3-0	1 Q	—N/a	Guyana; W 3-0	Australia; W 3-1	India; L 1-3	2nd place, silver medalist(s)

== Weightlifting ==
Singapore participated with 1 athlete (1 man).

Athlete	Event	Snatch		Clean & Jerk		Total	Rank
Athlete	Event	Result	Rank	Result	Rank	Total	Rank
En Wei John Cheah	Men's −85 kg	115	12	143	13	258	13

=== Powerlifting ===
Singapore participated with 1 athlete (1 man).

Athlete	Event	Result	Rank
Kalai Vanen	Men's heavyweight	135.1	9

== See also ==
- Singapore at the 2018 Winter Olympics
- Singapore at the 2018 Summer Youth Olympics
