= Table tennis at the 2018 Commonwealth Games – Mixed doubles =

Table tennis – Mixed doubles at the 2018 Commonwealth Games
- Venue: Oxenford Studios
- Dates: 11 – 15 April 2018
- Competitors: 94 from 21 nations

Medalists
gold medal	Gao Ning; Yu Mengyu	Singapore
silver medal	Liam Pitchford; Tin-Tin Ho	England
bronze medal	Sathiyan Gnanasekaran; Manika Batra	India

Table tennis mixed doubles at the 2018 Commonwealth Games was held at the Oxenford Studios on the Gold Coast, Australia from 11 to 15 April.

== Finals ==
Semifinals
Gao Ning (SGP); Yu Mengyu (SGP)	11	9	9	11	11
Sharath Kamal (IND); Mouma Das (IND)	8	11	11	7	7
Liam Pitchford (ENG); Tin-Tin Ho (ENG)	11	12	5	8	15
Sathiyan Gnanasekaran (IND); Manika Batra (IND)	8	10	11	11	13

Gold medal match
Gao Ning (SGP); Yu Mengyu (SGP)	12	12	11
Liam Pitchford (ENG); Tin-Tin Ho (ENG)	10	10	9
Bronze medal match
Sharath Kamal (IND); Mouma Das (IND)	6	2	4
Sathiyan Gnanasekaran (IND); Manika Batra (IND)	11	11	11

== Top half ==
=== Section 1 ===
Round of 64
F Khawaja (PAK); HA Ali (PAK)	7	6	6
A Bernadet (CAN); J Yeung (CAN)	11	11	11
P Wing (FIJ); S Yee (FIJ)	6	3	11
B Sam (GHA); C Baah-Danso (GHA)	11	11	13
G Nuopula (SOL); L Sifi (SOL)	6	3	0
S Walker (ENG); D Payet (ENG)	11	11	11
I Ranasingha (SRI); H Kapugeekinaya (SRI)	10	2	11
J Choong (MAS); K Lyne (MAS)	12	11	13

Round of 32
Gao N (SGP); Yu MY (SGP)	8	11	11	11
A Bernadet (CAN); J Yeung (CAN)	11	6	4	3
B Sam (GHA); C Baah-Danso (GHA)	2	1	3
Yan X (AUS); Lay JF (AUS)	11	11	11
G Sultan (SEY); C Bristol (SEY)	3	3	6
S Walker (ENG); D Payet (ENG)	11	11	11
J Choong (MAS); K Lyne (MAS)	11	11	3	11
H Desai (IND); P Sahasrabudhe (IND)	6	6	11	9

Round of 16
Gao N (SGP); Yu MY (SGP)	11	6	11	5	11
Yan X (AUS); Lay JF (AUS)	8	11	6	11	3
S Walker (ENG); D Payet (ENG)	12	11	8	11
J Choong (MAS); K Lyne (MAS)	10	6	11	2

Quarterfinals
Gao N (SGP); Yu MY (SGP)	11	11	11
S Walker (ENG); D Payet (ENG)	4	5	5

=== Section 2 ===
Round of 64
R Nyaika (UGA); H Nambozo (UGA)	6	4	6
D Powell (AUS); M Miao (AUS)	11	11	11
H Lulu (VAN); P Tommy (VAN)	5	6	6
S Britton (GUY); P Greaves (GUY)	11	11	11
A Yogarajah (MRI); SA Ramasawmy (MRI)	6	6	8
AH Rizal (MAS); Tee AX (MAS)	11	11	11
R Sirisena (SRI); I Madurangi (SRI)	9	11	11	11
M Mtalaso (TAN); F Pazi (TAN)	11	4	9	4

Round of 32
Wang Z (CAN); Zhang M (CAN)	11	12	8	11
D Powell (AUS); M Miao (AUS)	7	10	11	9
S Britton (GUY); P Greaves (GUY)	4	2	5
E Poh SF (SGP); Lin Y (SGP)	11	11	11
D McBeath (ENG); K Sibley (ENG)	11	11	11
AH Rizal (MAS); Tee AX (MAS)	9	6	5
R Sirisena (SRI); I Madurangi (SRI)	6	11	9	5
S Kamal (IND); M Das (IND)	11	4	11	11

Round of 16
Wang Z (CAN); Zhang M (CAN)	8	11	8	11	11
E Poh SF (SGP); Lin Y (SGP)	11	9	11	8	9
D McBeath (ENG); K Sibley (ENG)	5	9	9
S Kamal (IND); M Das (IND)	11	11	11

Quarterfinals
Wang Z (CAN); Zhang M (CAN)	9	9	11	5
S Kamal (IND); M Das (IND)	11	11	5	11

== Bottom half ==
=== Section 3 ===
Round of 64
T Vaea (TUV); B Katepu (TUV)	2	2	3
Beh KT (SGP); Zhang WL (SGP)	11	11	11
R Taucoory (MRI); E Ho WK (MRI)	11	11	11
M Rameez (PAK); F Khan (PAK)	4	9	7
B Jayasingha (SRI); E Warusawithana (SRI)	12	9	11	7	11
BN Mutua (KEN); S Thakkar (KEN)	10	11	2	11	9

Round of 32
L Pitchford (ENG); T-T Ho (ENG)	11	12	10	11
Beh KT (SGP); Zhang WL (SGP)	3	10	12	6
C Franklin (GUY); T Lowe (GUY)	4	8	9
T Carter (AUS); T Feng (AUS)	11	11	11
V Wu (FIJ); G Yee (FIJ)	7	1	4
R Taucoory (MRI); E Ho WK (MRI)	11	11	11
B Jayasingha (SRI); E Warusawithana (SRI)	5	8	5
SS Shetty (IND); M Patkar (IND)	11	11	11

Round of 16
L Pitchford (ENG); T-T Ho (ENG)	11	5	11	11
T Carter (AUS); T Feng (AUS)	6	11	6	9
R Taucoory (MRI); E Ho WK (MRI)	4	5	6
SS Shetty (IND); M Patkar (IND)	11	11	11

Quarterfinals
L Pitchford (ENG); T-T Ho (ENG)	6	11	4	11	11
SS Shetty (IND); M Patkar (IND)	11	5	11	7	7

=== Section 4 ===
Round of 64
D St.Louis (TTO); R Chung (TTO)	12	11	11
N Bryan (GUY); N Cummings (GUY)	10	4	5
Y Shing (VAN); A Lulu (VAN)	11	11	8	11
A Tumaini (TAN); N Mwaisyula (TAN)	9	7	11	3
B Chan YF (MRI); R Kinoo (MRI)	14	11	2	6
D Abrefa (GHA); C Kwabi (GHA)	16	7	11	11
Leong CF (MAS); Ho Y (MAS)	w	/	o
S Hodge (SKN); A Freeman (SKN)

Round of 32
Pang XJ (SGP); Zhou YH (SGP)	11	10	12	8	11
D St.Louis (TTO); R Chung (TTO)	2	12	10	11	6
Y Shing (VAN); A Lulu (VAN)	5	9	9
H Hu (AUS); M Tapper (AUS)	11	11	11
M Medjugorac (CAN); A Cote (CAN)	11	11	11
D Abrefa (GHA); C Kwabi (GHA)	7	8	6
Leong CF (MAS); Ho Y (MAS)	7	8	11
S Gnanasekaran (IND); M Batra (IND)	11	11	'13

Round of 16
Pang XJ (SGP); Zhou YH (SGP)	11	6	11	5	11
H Hu (AUS); M Tapper (AUS)	8	11	6	11	3
M Medjugorac (CAN); A Cote (CAN)	8	13	12	8	4
S Gnanasekaran (IND); M Batra (IND)	11	11	10	11	11

Quarterfinals
Pang XJ (SGP); Zhou YH (SGP)	6	10	12
S Gnanasekaran (IND); M Batra (IND)	11	12	14
