= Mauritius at the 2018 Commonwealth Games =

- Flag of Mauritius
- CG code: MRI
- CGA: Mauritius Olympic Committee

in Gold Coast, Australia 4 April 2018 – 15 April 2018
- Competitors: 54 in 10 sports
- Flag bearer: Rhikesh Taucoory (opening)
- Medals Ranked 34th: Gold 0 Silver 1 Bronze 0 Total 1

Commonwealth Games appearances (overview)
- 1958; 1962; 1966; 1970; 1974; 1978; 1982; 1986; 1990; 1994; 1998; 2002; 2006; 2010; 2014; 2018; 2022; 2026; 2030

Mauritius competed at the 2018 Commonwealth Games in the Gold Coast, Australia from April 4 to April 15, 2018.

Table tennis athlete Rhikesh Taucoory was the island's flag bearer during the opening ceremony.

== Medalists ==
Medal	Name	Sport	Event	Date
Silver	Marie Ranaivosoa	Weightlifting	Women's −48 kg	April 5

== Competitors ==
The following is the list of number of competitors participating at the Games per sport/discipline.

Sport	Men	Women	Total
Athletics	5	3	8
Badminton	3	3	6
Boxing	7	0	7
Cycling	4	2	6
Squash	1	0	1
Swimming	4	1	5
Table tennis	3	3	6
Triathlon	1	0	1
Weightlifting	5	5	10
Wrestling	2	2	4
Total	35	19	54

== Athletics ==
Men
Track & road events

Athlete	Event	Heat		Semifinal		Final	
Athlete	Event	Result	Rank	Result	Rank	Result	Rank
Marie Jean-Yann de Grace	100 m	10.53	4	Did not advance			
Marie Jean-Yann de Grace	200 m	21.18	4	Did not advance			
Mohammad Dookun	1500 m	3:53.43	9	—N/a		Did not advance	
Jérôme Caprice	20 km walk	—N/a				1:33:12	15

Field events

Athlete	Event	Qualification		Final	
Athlete	Event	Distance	Rank	Distance	Rank
Jonathan Drack	Long jump	7.37	19	Did not advance	
Jonathan Drack	Triple jump	16.14	9 q	16.28	6
Henry Baptiste	Shot put	17.20	13	Did not advance	

Women
Track & road events

Athlete	Event	Heat		Semifinal		Final	
Athlete	Event	Result	Rank	Result	Rank	Result	Rank
Joanilla Janvier	100 m	12.47	5	Did not advance			
Marie Emmanuelle Anaïs Alphonse	1500 m T54	—N/a				3:51.99	7
Marie Emmanuelle Anaïs Alphonse	Marathon T54	—N/a				2:11:59	7

Field events

Athlete	Event	Final	
Athlete	Event	Distance	Rank
Selma Rosun	Javelin throw	49.09	7

== Badminton ==
Mauritius participated with six athletes (three men and three women)

Singles

Athlete	Event	Round of 64	Round of 32	Round of 16	Quarterfinal	Semifinal	Final / BM	
Athlete	Event	Opposition Score	Opposition Score	Opposition Score	Opposition Score	Opposition Score	Opposition Score	Rank
Aatish Lubah	Men's singles	Ayittey (GHA); W 2 - 0	Kidambi (IND); L 0 - 2	Did not advance				
Julien Paul	Men's singles	Bye	Vijayanath (RSA); W 2 - 0	Karunaratna (SRI); L 0 - 2	Did not advance			
Christopher Jean Paul	Men's singles	Malcouzne (SEY); W 2 - 0	Kumar (IND); L 0 - 2	Did not advance				
Aurélie Allet	Women's singles	Bailey (JAM); W 2 - 0	Gilmour (SCO); L 0 - 2	Did not advance				
Nicki Chan-Lam	Women's singles	Bashir (PAK); W 2 - 0	Tam (CAN); L 0 - 2	Did not advance				
Kate Foo Kune	Women's singles	Bye	Ambalangodage (SRI); W 2 - 0	Tam (CAN); L 1 - 2	Did not advance			

Doubles

Athlete	Event	Round of 64	Round of 32	Round of 16	Quarterfinal	Semifinal	Final / BM	
Athlete	Event	Opposition Score	Opposition Score	Opposition Score	Opposition Score	Opposition Score	Opposition Score	Rank
Aatish Lubah; Christopher Jean Paul	Men's doubles	—N/a	Adeoye / Clark (FAI); W W/O	Rankireddy / Shetty (IND); L 0 - 2	Did not advance			
Aurélie Allet; Nicki Chan-Lam	Women's doubles	—N/a	Bangi / Nakiyemba (UGA); W W/O	Ambalangodage / Beruwelage (SRI); L 0 - 2	Did not advance			
Aurélie Allet; Julien Paul	Mixed doubles	Bhatti / Bashir (PAK); W 2 - 1	Chan / Goh (MAS); L 0 - 2	Did not advance				
Nicki Chan-Lam; Aatish Lubah	Mixed doubles	Coetzer / Butler-Emmett (RSA); L 1 - 2	Did not advance					

Mixed team

Roster

- Aurélie Allet
- Nicki Chan-Lam
- Kate Foo Kune
- Aatish Lubah
- Julien Paul
- Christopher Jean Paul

Pool B

Pos	Team	Pld	W	L	MF	MA	MD	GF	GA	GD	PF	PA	PD	Pts	Qualification
1	Singapore	3	3	0	15	0	+15	30	0	+30	630	308	+322	3	Knockout stage
2	Mauritius	3	2	1	10	5	+5	20	13	+7	603	542	+61	2	Knockout stage
3	Jamaica	3	1	2	5	10	−5	13	23	−10	540	675	−135	1	
4	Zambia	3	0	3	0	15	−15	3	30	−27	435	683	−248	0	

Source: GC2018

Mauritius
5
Carrara Sports and Leisure Centre, Gold Coast
5 April

Zambia
0

			1	2	3
1	(Mauritius) (Zambia)	Julien Paul; Kalombo Mulenga	21; 19	22; 20
2	(Mauritius) (Zambia)	Kate Foo Kune; Ogar Siamupangila	21; 15	21; 8
3	(Mauritius) (Zambia)	Aatish Lubah / Christopher Jean Paul; Kalombo Mulenga / Chongo Mulenga	21; 10	21; 15
4	(Mauritius) (Zambia)	Kate Foo Kune / Aurélie Allet; Ogar Siamupangila / Evelyn Siamupangila	21; 15	21; 18
5	(Mauritius) (Zambia)	Julien Paul / Aurélie Allet; Chongo Mulenga / Evelyn Siamupangila	21; 9	21; 16

Mauritius
5
Carrara Sports and Leisure Centre, Gold Coast
5 April

Jamaica
0

			1	2	3
1	(Mauritius) (Jamaica)	Julien Paul; Samuel Ricketts	18; 21	21; 17	21; 14
2	(Mauritius) (Jamaica)	Kate Foo Kune; Alana Bailey	21; 7	21; 6
3	(Mauritius) (Jamaica)	Julien Paul / Aurélie Allet; Anthony McNee / Katherine Wynter	21; 19	18; 21	21; 13
4	(Mauritius) (Jamaica)	Kate Foo Kune / Nicki Chan-Lam; Alana Bailey / Katherine Wynter	17; 21	21; 14	21; 5
5	(Mauritius) (Jamaica)	Aatish Lubah / Christopher Jean Paul; Anthony McNee / Dennis Coke	21; 14	21; 15

Singapore
5
Carrara Sports and Leisure Centre, Gold Coast
6 April

Mauritius
0

			1	2	3
1	(Singapore) (Mauritius)	Terry Hee / Danny Bawa Chrisnanta; Aatish Lubah / Christopher Jean Paul	21; 13	21; 11
2	(Singapore) (Mauritius)	Yeo Jia Min; Kate Foo Kune	21; 15	21; 16
3	(Singapore) (Mauritius)	Loh Kean Yew; Julien Paul	21; 14	21; 15
4	(Singapore) (Mauritius)	Ren-ne Ong / Crystal Wong; Kate Foo Kune / Aurélie Allet	21; 9	21; 12
5	(Singapore) (Mauritius)	Terry Hee / Tan Wei Han; Aatish Lubah / Nicki Chan-Lam	21; 10	21; 14

Quarterfinals

India
3
Carrara Sports and Leisure Centre, Gold Coast
7 April

Mauritius
0

			1	2	3
1	(India) (Mauritius)	Satwiksairaj Rankireddy / Chirag Shetty; Aatish Lubah / Christopher Jean Paul	21; 12	21; 3
2	(India) (Mauritius)	Ashwini Ponnappa / N. Sikki Reddy; Aurélie Allet / Nicki Chan-Lam	21; 8	21; 7
3	(India) (Mauritius)	Srikanth Kidambi; Julien Paul	21; 12	21; 14
4	(India) (Mauritius)	Saina Nehwal; Kate Foo Kune				not played
5	(India) (Mauritius)	Satwiksairaj Rankireddy / N. Sikki Reddy; Julien Paul / Aurélie Allet				not played

== Boxing ==
Mauritius participated with a team of 7 athletes (7 men)

Men

Athlete	Event	Round of 32	Round of 16	Quarterfinals	Semifinals	Final	Rank
Athlete	Event	Opposition Result	Opposition Result	Opposition Result	Opposition Result	Opposition Result	Rank
Sharvin Beedassee	−49 kg	—N/a	Bye	Yafai (ENG); L ABD	Did not advance		
Jordy Vadamootoo	−56 kg	—N/a	Mokhotho (SLE); L 2 - 3	Did not advance			
Jean John Colin	−60 kg	Bye	Vea (TGA); W 4 - 0	McGivern (NIR); L 0 - 5	Did not advance		
Louis Colin	−64 kg	Davule (FIJ); W 5 - 0	Colin (GHA); L 2 - 3	Did not advance			
Merven Clair	−69 kg	Quartey (GHA); W 5 - 0	Bwogi (UGA); L 2 - 3	Did not advance			
Jean Alberte	−75 kg	Docherty (SCO); L 0 - 5	Did not advance				
Louis Olivier	−81 kg	—N/a	O'Reilly (CAN); L 0 - 5	Did not advance			

== Cycling ==
Mauritius participated with 6 athletes (4 men and 2 women).

=== Road ===
Men

Athlete	Event	Time	Rank
Alexandre Mayer	Road race	4:07:59	49
Alexandre Mayer	Time trial	55:08.45	30
Dylan Redy	Road race	DNF	
Christopher Rougier-Lagane	Road race	3:59:11	30
Christopher Rougier-Lagane	Time trial	55:05.59	29
Gregory Rougier-Lagane	Road race	DNF	
Gregory Rougier-Lagane	Time trial	58:13.65	38

Women

Athlete	Event	Time	Rank
Aurelie Halbwachs	Road race	3:12:57	33
Aurelie Halbwachs	Time trial	40:23.21	12
Kimberley Le Court De Billot	Road race	3:10:59	30

== Squash ==
Mauritius participated with 1 athlete (1 man).

Individual

Athlete	Event	Round of 64	Round of 32	Round of 16	Quarterfinals	Semifinals	Final	
Athlete	Event	Opposition Score	Opposition Score	Opposition Score	Opposition Score	Opposition Score	Opposition Score	Rank
Xavier Koenig	Men's singles	Mansaray (SLE); W 3 - 0	Malhotra (IND); L 0 - 3	Did not advance				

== Swimming ==
Mauritius participated with 5 athletes (4 men and 1 woman).

Men

Athlete	Event	Heat		Semifinal		Final	
Athlete	Event	Time	Rank	Time	Rank	Time	Rank
Gregory Anodin	50 m freestyle	24.52	39	Did not advance			
Bradley Vincent	50 m freestyle	22.50	11 Q	22.60	13	Did not advance	
Gregory Anodin	100 m freestyle	52.97	36	Did not advance			
Mathieu Marquet	100 m freestyle	51.71	31	Did not advance			
Bradley Vincent	100 m freestyle	49.93	17	Did not advance			
Gregory Anodin	200 m freestyle	1:58.92	25	—N/a		Did not advance	
Mathieu Marquet	200 m freestyle	1:53.27	22	—N/a		Did not advance	
Mathieu Marquet	400 m freestyle	4:09.79	14	—N/a		Did not advance	
Jonathan Chung Yee	50 m breaststroke	31.25	27	Did not advance			
Jonathan Chung Yee	100 m breaststroke	1:07.92	21	Did not advance			
Jonathan Chung Yee	200 m breaststroke	2:22.71	13	—N/a		Did not advance	
Gregory Anodin	50 m butterfly	27.09	42	Did not advance			
Bradley Vincent	50 m butterfly	25.30	26	Did not advance			
Gregory Anodin	100 m butterfly	1:00.98	26	Did not advance			
Bradley Vincent; Gregory Anodin; Jonathan Chung Yee; Mathieu Marquet	4 × 100 m freestyle relay	3:34.58	9	—N/a		Did not advance	
Bradley Vincent; Jonathan Chung Yee; Mathieu Marquet; Gregory Anodin	4 × 100 m medley relay	4:04.51	8 Q	—N/a		3:57.29	8

Women

Athlete	Event	Heat		Semifinal		Final	
Athlete	Event	Time	Rank	Time	Rank	Time	Rank
Elodie Poo Cheong	50 m freestyle	27.63	24	Did not advance			
Elodie Poo Cheong	100 m freestyle	59.69	23	Did not advance			
Elodie Poo Cheong	50 m butterfly	28.63	16 Q	28.43	15	Did not advance	
Elodie Poo Cheong	100 m butterfly	1:04.39	18	Did not advance			

== Table tennis ==
Mauritius participated with 6 athletes (3 men and 3 women).

Singles

Athletes	Event	Group stage			Round of 64	Round of 32	Round of 16	Quarterfinal	Semifinal	Final	Rank
Athletes	Event	Opposition Score	Opposition Score	Rank	Opposition Score	Opposition Score	Opposition Score	Opposition Score	Opposition Score	Opposition Score	Rank
Brian Chan Yook Fo	Men's singles	Spencer (SVG); W 4 - 0	Franklin (GUY); W 4 - 1	1 Q	Bye	Aruna (NGR); L 0 - 4	Did not advance				
Rhikesh Taucoory	Men's singles	Howieson (SCO); L 0 - 4	Dowell (BAR); W 4 - 2	2	Did not advance						
Akhilen Yogarajah	Men's singles	Khawaja (PAK); W 4 - 2	Sultan (SEY); W 4 - 0	1 Q	Abrefa (GHA); L 1 - 4	Did not advance					
Elodie Ho Wan Kau	Women's singles	Qwea (VAN); W 4 - 1	Thakkar (KEN); W 4 - 0	1 Q	—N/a	Das (IND); L 0 - 4	Did not advance				
Ruqayyah Kinoo	Women's singles	Madurangi (SRI); L 1 - 4	Payet (ENG); L 0 - 4	3	—N/a	Did not advance					
Sanjana Ramasawmy	Women's singles	Cote (CAN); L 0 - 4	Greaves (GUY); W 4 - 1	2	—N/a	Did not advance					

Doubles

Athletes	Event	Round of 64	Round of 32	Round of 16	Quarterfinal	Semifinal	Final	Rank
Athletes	Event	Opposition Score	Opposition Score	Opposition Score	Opposition Score	Opposition Score	Opposition Score	Rank
Rhikesh Taucoory; Akhilen Yogarajah	Men's doubles	Bye	Gao / Pang (SGP); L 0 - 3	Did not advance				
Ruqayyah Kinoo; Sanjana Ramasawmy	Women's doubles	—N/a	Mukherjee / Sahasrabudhe (IND); L 0 - 3	Did not advance				
Sanjana Ramasawmy; Akhilen Yogarajah	Mixed doubles	Rizal / Tee (MAS); L 0 - 3	Did not advance					
Ruqayyah Kinoo; Brian Chan Yook Fo	Mixed doubles	Abrefa / Kwabi (GHA); L 1 - 3	Did not advance					
Elodie Ho Wan Kau; Rhikesh Taucoory	Mixed doubles	Rameez / Khan (PAK); W 3 - 0	Wu / Yee (FIJ); W 3 - 0	Shetty / Patkar (IND); L 0 - 3	Did not advance			

Team

Athletes	Event	Group stage			Round of 16	Quarterfinal	Semifinal	Final	Rank
Athletes	Event	Opposition Score	Opposition Score	Rank	Opposition Score	Opposition Score	Opposition Score	Opposition Score	Rank
Brian Chan Yook Fo; Rhikesh Taucoory; Akhilen Yogarajah	Men's team	Singapore; L 0 - 3	Barbados; W 3 - 2	2 Q	Northern Ireland; L 0 - 3	Did not advance			
Elodie Chan Yook Fo; Ruqayyah Kinoo; Sanjana Ramasawmy	Women's team	Australia; L 0 - 3	Canada; L 0 - 3	3	—N/a	Did not advance			

== Triathlon ==
Mauritius participated with 1 athlete (1 man).

Individual

Athlete	Event	Swim (750 m)	Trans 1	Bike (20 km)	Trans 2	Run (5 km)	Total	Rank
Timothee Hugnin	Men's	10:09	0:39	30:48	0:28	18:20	1:00:24	27

== Weightlifting ==
Mauritius participated with 10 athletes (5 men and 5 women).

Men

Athlete	Event	Snatch		Clean & jerk		Total	Rank
Athlete	Event	Result	Rank	Result	Rank	Total	Rank
Jack Dorian Madanamoothoo	−56 kg	85	8	110	8	195	8
Marc Coret	−62 kg	105	11	135	10	240	11
Dinesh Pandoo	−69 kg	105	13	135	10	240	10
Jack Anthony Madanamoothoo	−77 kg	120	12	153	12	273	12
Alvin Jooron	+105 kg	105	11	140	12	245	12

Women

Athlete	Event	Snatch		Clean & jerk		Total	Rank
Athlete	Event	Result	Rank	Result	Rank	Total	Rank
Marie Ranaivosoa	−48 kg	76	2	94	2	170	2nd place, silver medalist(s)
Ketty Lent	−58 kg	72	8	91	9	163	8
Emanuella Labonne	−69 kg	85	7	100	8	185	8
Alison Sunee	−75 kg	68	11	90	11	158	11
Shalinee Valaydon	+90 kg	95	7	110	7	205	7

== Wrestling ==
Mauritius participated with 4 athletes (2 men and 2 women).

Repechage Format

Athlete	Event	Round of 16	Quarterfinal	Semifinal	Repechage	Final / BM	
Athlete	Event	Opposition Result	Opposition Result	Opposition Result	Opposition Result	Opposition Result	Rank
Jean Guyliane Bandou	Men's -65 kg	Bye	Kun (NRU); W 4 - 0	Charig (WAL); L 0 - 4	Bye	Bowling (ENG); L 0 - 4	5
Jean Frederic Marianne	Men's -74 kg	Khullar (NZL); L 0 - 4	Did not advance				15
Katouskia Pariadhaven	Women's -76 kg	—N/a	Onyebuchi (NGR); L 0 - 4	Did not advance	—N/a	Kiran (IND); L 0 - 5	5

Group stage Format

Athlete	Event	Group stage				Semifinal	Final / BM	
Athlete	Event	Opposition Result	Opposition Result	Opposition Result	Rank	Opposition Result	Opposition Result	Rank
Noellancia Genave	Women's -57 kg	Essombe Tiako (CMR); L 0 - 5	McDaid (NIR); L 0 - 5	Adekuoroye (NGR); L 0 - 4	4	Did not advance		7

== Controversy ==
- Mauritius chef de mission Kaysee Teeroovengadum, indecently assaulted a Mauritian female athlete on the Gold Coast one day out from the opening ceremony. At that night, after meeting with the member of the Olympic Committee and listening to the versions of the two people concerned, Teeroovengadum made the decision to stand down from his post.

== See also ==
- Mauritius at the 2018 Summer Youth Olympics
