= Table tennis at the 2018 Commonwealth Games – Men's doubles =

Table tennis – Men's doubles at the 2018 Commonwealth Games
- Venue: Oxenford Studios
- Dates: 11 – 14 April 2018
- Competitors: 152 from 25 nations

Medalists
gold medal	Paul Drinkhall; Liam Pitchford	England
silver medal	Sharath Kamal; Sathiyan Gnanasekaran	India
bronze medal	Harmeet Desai; Sanil Shankar Shetty	India

Table tennis men's doubles at the 2018 Commonwealth Games was held at the Oxenford Studios on the Gold Coast, Australia from 11 to 14 April.

== Finals ==
Semifinals
Sharath Kamal (IND); Sathiyan Gnanasekaran (IND)	7	11	11	11
Koen Pang Yew En (SGP); Ethan Poh Shao Feng (SGP)	11	5	1	3
Harmeet Desai (IND); Sanil Shankar Shetty (IND)	7	11	11
Paul Drinkhall (ENG); Liam Pitchford (ENG)	11	13	13

Gold medal match
Sharath Kamal (IND); Sathiyan Gnanasekaran (IND)	5	12	11	6	8
Paul Drinkhall (ENG); Liam Pitchford (ENG)	11	10	9	11	11
Bronze medal match
Koen Pang Yew En (SGP); Ethan Poh Shao Feng (SGP)	5	6	10
Harmeet Desai (IND); Sanil Shankar Shetty (IND)	11	11	12

== Top half ==
=== Section 1 ===
Round of 64

Round of 32
S Kamal (IND); S Gnanasekaran (IND)	11	11	11
T Kiita (KIR); N Takooa (KIR)	2	5	6
M Mtalaso (TAN); A Tumaini (TAN)	6	8	11	5
B Jayasingha (SRI); I Ranasingha (SRI)	11	11	9	11
C Howieson (SCO); G Rumgay (SCO)	11	11	11
O Cathcart (NIR); Z Wilson (NIR)	8	6	9
D Hukmani (BIZ); T Su (BIZ)	3	2	2
D McBeath (ENG); S Walker (ENG)	11	11	11

Round of 16
S Kamal (IND); S Gnanasekaran (IND)	11	11	12
B Jayasingha (SRI); I Ranasingha (SRI)	3	4	10
C Howieson (SCO); G Rumgay (SCO)	5	9	9
D McBeath (ENG); S Walker (ENG)	11	11	11

Quarterfinals
S Kamal (IND); S Gnanasekaran (IND)	11	11	12
D McBeath (ENG); S Walker (ENG)	7	8	10

=== Section 2 ===
Round of 64

Round of 32
D Powell (AUS); K Townsend (AUS)	3	8	7
K Pang YE (SGP); E Poh SF (SGP)	11	11	11
E Asante (GHA); B Sam (GHA)	8	11	11	11
H Lulu (VAN); Y Shing (VAN)	11	5	7	6
J Choong (MAS); Leong CF (MAS)	11	11	11
K Doughty (BAR); M Smith (BAR)	2	7	7
S Tomlinson (JAM); K Watson (JAM)	3	6	6
Q Aruna (NGR); S Toriola (NGR)	11	11	11

Round of 16
K Pang YE (SGP); E Poh SF (SGP)	11	11	11
E Asante (GHA); B Sam (GHA)	6	3	5
J Choong (MAS); Leong CF (MAS)	7	11	8	5
Q Aruna (NGR); S Toriola (NGR)	11	9	11	11

Quarterfinals
K Pang YE (SGP); E Poh SF (SGP)	11	11	11	11
Q Aruna (NGR); S Toriola (NGR)	13	9	7	8

== Bottom half ==
=== Section 3 ===
Round of 64
Y Dookram (TTO); A Wilson (TTO)	11	11	10	11
A Mitchell (SVG); R Spencer (SVG)	4	5	12	4

Round of 32
H Desai (IND); SS Shetty (IND)	11	11	11
S Britton (GUY); C Franklin (GUY)	6	5	7
K Melton (TUV); T Vaea (TUV)	4	3	2
P McCreery (NIR); A Robinson (NIR)	11	11	11
P Wing (FIJ); V Wu (FIJ)	9	11	7
Y Dookram (TTO); A Wilson (TTO)	11	13	11
M Dowell (BAR); T Knight (BAR)	6	6	6
H Hu (AUS); Xin Y (AUS)	11	11	11

Round of 16
H Desai (IND); SS Shetty (IND)	11	12	11
P McCreery (NIR); A Robinson (NIR)	4	10	9
Y Dookram (TTO); A Wilson (TTO)	2	10	9
H Hu (AUS); Xin Y (AUS)	11	12	11

Quarterfinals
H Desai (IND); SS Shetty (IND)	11	10	12	11
H Hu (AUS); Xin Y (AUS)	8	12	10	8

=== Section 4 ===
Round of 64

Round of 32
Gao N (SGP); Pang XJ (SGP)	11	11	11
R Taucoory (MRI); A Yogarajah (MRI)	3	7	2
R Benjamin (SLE); E Gboyah (SLE)	1	4	4
M Medjugorac (CAN); Wang Z (CAN)	11	11	11
B Abiodun (NGR); O Omotayo (NGR)	11	11	11
F Khawaja (PAK); M Rameez (PAK)	1	3	4
D Abrefa (GHA); F Lartey (GHA)	2	6	9
P Drinkhall (ENG); L Pitchford (ENG)	11	11	11

Round of 16
Gao N (SGP); Pang XJ (SGP)	12	11	11
M Medjugorac (CAN); Wang Z (CAN)	10	2	8
B Abiodun (NGR); O Omotayo (NGR)	7	8	3
P Drinkhall (ENG); L Pitchford (ENG)	11	11	11

Quarterfinals
Gao N (SGP); Pang XJ (SGP)	7	11	16	11	8
P Drinkhall (ENG); L Pitchford (ENG)	11	13	14	5	11
