= Ghana at the 2018 Commonwealth Games =

- Flag of Ghana
- CGF code: GHA
- CGA: Ghana Olympic Committee

in Gold Coast, Australia 4 April 2018 – 15 April 2018
- Competitors: 70 in 10 sports
- Flag bearer: Abdul Omar
- Medals Ranked 39th: Gold 0 Silver 0 Bronze 1 Total 1

Commonwealth Games appearances (overview)
- 1954; 1958; 1962; 1966; 1970; 1974; 1978; 1982; 1986; 1990; 1994; 1998; 2002; 2006; 2010; 2014; 2018; 2022; 2026; 2030

Ghana competed at the 2018 Commonwealth Games in Gold Coast, Queensland from 4 to 15 April 2018. It was Ghana's 16th appearance at the Commonwealth Games.

Boxer Abdul Omar was the country's flag bearer during the opening ceremony.

== Medalists ==
Medal	Name	Sport	Event	Date
Bronze	Jessie Lartey	Boxing	Men's −64 kg	April 14

== Competitors ==
The following is the list of number of competitors participating at the Games per sport/discipline.

Sport	Men	Women	Total
Athletics	8	9	17
Badminton	4	4	8
Boxing	7	0	7
Cycling	5	0	5
Hockey	0	18	18
Shooting	1	1	2
Swimming	2	2	4
Table tennis	4	2	6
Weightlifting	3	1	4
Total	34	37	71

== Athletics ==
Men
Track & road events

Athlete	Event	Heat		Semifinal		Final	
Athlete	Event	Result	Rank	Result	Rank	Result	Rank
Sarfo Ansah	100 m	10.41	4	Did not advance			
Sean Safo-Antwi	100 m	10.95	5	Did not advance			
Joseph Amoah	200 m	20.84	4 Q	20.99	7	Did not advance	
Martin Owusu-Antwi	200 m	21.02 SB	2 Q	25.95	8	Did not advance	
Alex Amankwah	800 m	1:47.80	4	—N/a		Did not advance	
Felix Acheampong	1500 m T54	3:30.66	6	—N/a		Did not advance	
Nkegbe Botsyo	1500 m T54	3:25.55	5 q	—N/a		3:18.71	9
Felix Acheampong	Marathon T54	—N/a				1:57:54	9
Nkegbe Botsyo	Marathon T54	—N/a				1:56:56	8
Joseph Amoah; Sarfo Ansah; Atsu Nyamadi; Martin Owusu-Antwi; Sean Safo-Antwi	4 × 100 m	DNS		—N/a		Did not advance	

Combined events – Decathlon

Athlete	Event	100 m	LJ	SP	HJ	400 m	110H	DT	PV	JT	1500 m	Final	Rank
Atsu Nyamadi	Result	11.27	7.25	14.49	2.01	50.45	14.82	46.61	NM	DNS		DNF	
Atsu Nyamadi	Points	801	874	758	813	794	871	800	0	DNS		DNF	

Women
Track & road events

Athlete	Event	Heat		Semifinal		Final	
Athlete	Event	Result	Rank	Result	Rank	Result	Rank
Gemma Acheampong	100 m	11.62	3 Q	11.79	6	Did not advance	
Halutie Hor	100 m	11.45	1 Q	11.46	3 q	11.54	8
Flings Owusu Agyapong	100 m	11.74	5 q	11.60	6	Did not advance	
Janet Amponsah	200 m	23.66	2 Q	23.67	6	Did not advance	
Rafiatu Nuhu	400 m	54.02	5	Did not advance			
Akua Obeng-Akrofi	400 m	52.44	3 Q	53.16	5	Did not advance	
Agnes Abu	800 m	2:02.50	6	—N/a		Did not advance	
Gemma Acheampong; Janet Amponsah; Halutie Hor; Flings Owusu Agyapong	4 × 100 m	—N/a				43.64	5

Field events

Athlete	Event	Final	
Athlete	Event	Distance	Rank
Nadia Eke	Triple jump	13.05	10

Combined events – Heptathlon

Athlete	Event	100H	HJ	SP	200 m	LJ	JT	800 m	Final	Rank
Elizabeth Dadzie	Result	13.49	1.63	11.06	DSQ	5.76	38.21	2:19.10	4668	12
Elizabeth Dadzie	Points	1052	771	599	0	777	633	836	4668	12

== Badminton ==
Ghana participated with eight athletes (four men and four women)

Singles

Athlete	Event	Round of 64	Round of 32	Round of 16	Quarterfinal	Semifinal	Final / BM	
Athlete	Event	Opposition Score	Opposition Score	Opposition Score	Opposition Score	Opposition Score	Opposition Score	Rank
Abraham Ayittey	Men's singles	Aatish Lubah (MRI); L 0 - 2	Did not advance					
Emmanuel Donkor	Men's singles	Bye	Buwaneka Goonethilleka (SRI); L 0 - 2	Did not advance				
Daniel Sam	Men's singles	Anthony Joe (AUS); L 0 - 2	Did not advance					
Stella Amasah	Women's singles	Ogar Siamupangila (ZAM); L 0 - 2	Did not advance					
Grace Atipaka	Women's singles	Juliette Ah-Wan (SEY); W 2 - 0	Ruthvika Gadde (IND); L 0 - 2	Did not advance				
Eyram Migbodzi	Women's singles	Wendy Chen Hsuan-yu (AUS); L 0 - 2	Did not advance					

Doubles

Athlete	Event	Round of 64	Round of 32	Round of 16	Quarterfinal	Semifinal	Final / BM	
Athlete	Event	Opposition Score	Opposition Score	Opposition Score	Opposition Score	Opposition Score	Opposition Score	Rank
Emmanuel Donkor; Daniel Sam	Men's doubles	—N/a	Coetzer / Vijayanath (RSA); W 2 - 1	Goh / Tan (MAS); L 0 - 2	Did not advance			
Abraham Ayittey; Michael Baah	Men's doubles	—N/a	Campbell / MacHugh (SCO); L 0 - 2	Did not advance				
Stella Amasah; Eyram Migbodzi	Women's doubles	—N/a	Johnson / le Tissier (GUE); L 0 - 2	Did not advance				
Grace Atipaka; Gifty Mensah	Women's doubles	—N/a	Cheah / Jemie Lai (MAS); L 0 - 2	Did not advance				
Stella Amasah; Emmanuel Donkor	Mixed doubles	Fong / Whiteside (FIJ); W 2 - 1	B Li / J Li (IOM); W 2 - 0	Goh / Lai (MAS); L 0 - 2	Did not advance			
Eyram Migbodzi; Daniel Sam	Mixed doubles	Chrisnanta / Wong (SGP); L 0 - 2	Did not advance					
Gifty Mensah; Abraham Ayittey	Mixed doubles	Goonethilleka / Sirimannage (SRI); L 0 - 2	Did not advance					
Grace Atipaka; Michael Baah	Mixed doubles	Bye	Wong / Ong (SGP); L 0 - 2	Did not advance				

Mixed team

Roster

- Stella Amasah
- Grace Atipaka
- Abraham Ayittey
- Emmanuel Donkor
- Gifty Mensah
- Eyram Migbodzi
- Daniel Sam

Pool D

Pos	Team	Pld	W	L	MF	MA	MD	GF	GA	GD	PF	PA	PD	Pts	Qualification
1	Malaysia	2	2	0	9	1	+8	19	2	+17	433	202	+231	2	Knockout stage
2	Canada	2	1	1	6	4	+2	12	9	+3	358	328	+30	1	Knockout stage
3	Ghana	2	0	2	0	10	−10	0	20	−20	159	420	−261	0	
4	Seychelles DSQ	0	0	0	0	0	0	0	0	0	0	0	0	0	

Updated to match(es) played on 6 April 2018. Source:

Malaysia
5
Carrara Sports and Leisure Centre, Gold Coast
5 April

Ghana
0

			1	2	3
1	(Malaysia) (Ghana)	Goh V Shem / Tan Wee Kiong; Abraham Ayittey / Micheal Opoku Baah	21; 8	21; 11
2	(Malaysia) (Ghana)	Soniia Cheah; Stella Koteikai Amasah	21; 3	21; 5
3	(Malaysia) (Ghana)	Lee Chong Wei; Daniel Sam	21; 2	21; 7
4	(Malaysia) (Ghana)	Vivian Hoo / Chow Mei Kuan; Grace Atipaka / Eyram Migbodzi	21; 2	21; 3
5	(Malaysia) (Ghana)	Chan Peng Soon / Goh Liu Ying; Emmanuel Donkor / Gifty Mensah	21; 7	21; 6

Canada
5
Carrara Sports and Leisure Centre, Gold Coast
6 April

Ghana
0

			1	2	3
1	(Canada) (Ghana)	Brian Yang; Emmanuel Donkor	21; 10	21; 10
2	(Canada) (Ghana)	Brittney Tam; Grace Atipaka	21; 7	21; 7
3	(Canada) (Ghana)	Jason Ho-Shue / Ty Alexander Lindeman; Emmanuel Donkor / Daniel Sam	21; 14	21; 15
4	(Canada) (Ghana)	Rachel Honderich / Kristen Tsai; Stella Koteikai Amasah / Gifty Mensah	21; 10	21; 8
5	(Canada) (Ghana)	Brian Yang / Michelle Li; Daniel Sam / Eyram Migbodzi	21; 11	21; 13

Seychelles
DSQ
Carrara Sports and Leisure Centre, Gold Coast
6 April

Ghana

			1	2	3
1	(Seychelles) (Ghana)	Kervin Ghislain / Allisen Camille; Daniel Sam / Stella Koteikai Amasah				not played
2	(Seychelles) (Ghana)	Steve Malcouzane; Abraham Ayittey				not played
3	(Seychelles) (Ghana)	Juliette Ah-Wan; Gifty Mensah				not played
4	(Seychelles) (Ghana)	Steve Malcouzane / Kervin Ghislain; Michael Opoku Baah / Emmanuel Donkor				not played
5	(Seychelles) (Ghana)	Juliette Ah-Wan / Allisen Camille; Grace Atipaka / Eyram Migbodzi				not played

== Boxing ==
Ghana participated with a team of 7 athletes (7 men)

Men

Athlete	Event	Round of 32	Round of 16	Quarterfinals	Semifinals	Final	Rank
Athlete	Event	Opposition Result	Opposition Result	Opposition Result	Opposition Result	Opposition Result	Rank
Tetteh Sulemanu	−49 kg	—N/a	Panghal (IND); L 0 - 5	Did not advance			
Akimos Ampiah	−52 kg	—N/a	Solanki (IND); L 0 - 5	Did not advance			
Samuel Addo	−56 kg	—N/a	Ojo (NGR); W 4 - 1	McGrail (ENG); L 0 - 5	Did not advance		
Abdul Omar	−60 kg	Garside (AUS); L 0 - 5	Did not advance				
Jessie Lartey	−64 kg	Bye	Colin (MRI); W 3 - 2	Blom (RSA); W 3 - 2	Blumenfeld (CAN); L 0 - 5	Did not advance	3rd place, bronze medalist(s)
Abubakari Quartey	−69 kg	Clair (MRI); L 0–5	Did not advance				
Musah Lawson	−75 kg	Bye	Ntsengue (CMR); L 1 - 4	Did not advance			

== Cycling ==
Ghana participated with 5 athletes (5 men).

=== Road ===
Men

Athlete	Event	Time	Rank
Abdul Abdul Mimin	Road race	DNF	
Anthony Boakye Dankwa	Road race	DNF	
Abdul Umar	Road race	DNF	
Abdul Abdul Mimin	Time trial	56:40.44	36
Anthony Boakye Dankwa	Time trial	56:36.75	35

=== Track ===
Sprint

Athlete	Event	Qualification		Semifinals	Final	
Athlete	Event	Time	Rank	Opposition Time	Opposition Time	Rank
Frederick Assor; Rudolf Mensah (pilot)	Men's tandem sprint B	12.816	5	Did not advance		

Time trial

Athlete	Event	Time	Rank
Frederick Assor; Rudolf Mensah (pilot)	Men's tandem time trial B	1:26.002	5

== Hockey ==
Ghana qualified a women's [field] hockey team of 18 athletes, after being ranked in the top nine in the Commonwealth (minus the host nation Australia). This will mark the country's Commonwealth debut in the sport.

=== Women's tournament ===
Roster

- Juwaila Acquah
- Janet Adampa
- Bennedicta Adjei
- Lydia Afriyie
- Cecilia Amoako
- Mavis Ampem-Darkoa
- Bridget Azumah
- Mavis Berko
- Serwaa Boakye
- Ernestina Coffie
- Emelia Fosuaa
- Vivian Narkuor
- Elizabeth Opoku
- Roberta Owusu
- Martha Safoa
- Adizatu Sulemana
- Nafisatu Umaru
- Deborah Whyte

Pool B

Pos	Team	Pld	W	D	L	GF	GA	GD	Pts	Qualification
1	Australia (H)	4	3	1	0	8	0	+8	10	Advance to Semi-finals
2	New Zealand	4	2	2	0	18	1	+17	8	Advance to Semi-finals
3	Canada	4	1	2	1	5	2	+3	5	5th–6th place match
4	Scotland	4	1	1	2	6	8	−2	4	7th–8th place match
5	Ghana	4	0	0	4	1	27	−26	0	9th–10th place match

Source: FIH
Rules for classification: 1) points; 2) number of wins; 3) goal difference; 4) goals scored; 5) head-to-head results.
(H) Hosts

6 April 2018
16:30

New Zealand	12–0	Ghana
Doar 10', 50', 53'; Smith 14'; Charlton 16'; Gloyn 28'; Michelsen 33'; Merry 35'; Harrison 43'; McLaren 49', 59'; Robinson 51'	Report

Umpires:
Catherine Wright (GBR)
Aleisha Neumann (AUS)

7 April 2018
21:30

Australia	5–0	Ghana
Bone 2'; Kenny 7', 30'; Claxton 14'; Peris 41'	Report

Umpires:
Sarah Wilson (SCO)
Durgi Devi (IND)

9 April 2018
16:30

Scotland	5–0	Ghana
Collins 11'; K. Robertson 12'; Brown 37'; Brodie 45'; Alexander-Lloyd 47'	Report

Umpires:
Nur Hafizah Azman (MAS)
Catherine Wright (WAL)

11 April 2018
11:30

Canada	5–1	Ghana
Stairs 12', 54'; Secco 29'; Hennig 34'; Wright 52'	Report	Amoako 33'

Umpires:
Aleisha Neumann (AUS)
Nur Hafizah Azman (MAS)

Ninth and tenth place

12 April 2018
13:30

Wales	1–1	Ghana
Evans 53'	Report	Boakye 44'
Penalties
French (penalty shoot-out scored); Jones (penalty shoot-out scored); Evans (penalty shoot-out missed)	2–0	(penalty shoot-out missed) Umaru; (penalty shoot-out missed) Amoako; (penalty shoot-out missed) Opoku; (penalty shoot-out missed) Afriyie

Umpires:
Durga Devi (IND)
Emma Shelbourn (ENG)

== Shooting ==
Ghana participated with 2 athletes (1 man and 1 woman).

Athlete	Event	Qualification		Final	
Athlete	Event	Points	Rank	Points	Rank
Emmanuel Koli Appiah	Men's 50 metre rifle prone	571.1	30	Did not advance	
Mercy Chodo	Women's 50 metre rifle 3 positions	553	16	Did not advance	
Mercy Chodo	Women's 50 metre rifle prone	—N/a		597.5	18

== Swimming ==
Ghana participated with 4 athletes (2 men and 2 women).

Men

Athlete	Event	Heat		Semifinal		Final	
Athlete	Event	Time	Rank	Time	Rank	Time	Rank
Jason Arthur	100 m backstroke	56.52	14 Q	56.85	15	Did not advance	
Jason Arthur	200 m backstroke	2:03.91	15	—N/a		Did not advance	
Jason Arthur	200 m individual medley	2:07.44	18	—N/a		Did not advance	
Abeiku Jackson	50 m freestyle	23.47	24	Did not advance			
Abeiku Jackson	50 m butterfly	24.68	16 Q	24.86	16	Did not advance	
Abeiku Jackson	100 m butterfly	54.79	13 Q	54.79	15	Did not advance	

Women

Athlete	Event	Heat		Semifinal		Final	
Athlete	Event	Time	Rank	Time	Rank	Time	Rank
Rebecca Asare	50 m backstroke	36.64	30	Did not advance			
Maayaa Ayawere	50 m freestyle	28.38	26	Did not advance			
Maayaa Ayawere	100 m freestyle	1:04.71	33	Did not advance			

== Table tennis ==
Ghana participated with 6 athletes (4 men and 2 women).

Singles

Athletes	Event	Group stage			Round of 64	Round of 32	Round of 16	Quarterfinal	Semifinal	Final	Rank
Athletes	Event	Opposition Score	Opposition Score	Rank	Opposition Score	Opposition Score	Opposition Score	Opposition Score	Opposition Score	Opposition Score	Rank
Derek Abrefa	Men's singles	Gboyah (SLE); W 4 - 0	Johnny (KIR); W 4 - 0	1 Q	Yogarajah (MRI); W 4 - 1	Wang (CAN); L 1 - 4	Did not advance				
Felix Lartey	Men's singles	Dookram (TTO); W 4 - 1	Leong (MAS); L 0 - 4	2	Did not advance						
Bernard Sam	Men's singles	Bryan (GUY); W 4 - 2	Knight (BAR); W 4 - 3	1 Q	Bye	Hu (AUS); L 0 - 4	Did not advance				
Celia Baah-Danso	Women's singles	Sifi (SOL); W 4 - 0	Lulu (VAN); W 4 - 1	1 Q	—N/a	Bristol (SEY); W 4 - 1	Yu (SGP); L 0 - 4	Did not advance			
Cynthia Kwabi	Women's singles	Warusawithana (SRI); L 0 - 4	Chung (TTO); L 0 - 4	3	—N/a	Did not advance					

Doubles

Athletes	Event	Round of 64	Round of 32	Round of 16	Quarterfinal	Semifinal	Final	Rank
Athletes	Event	Opposition Score	Opposition Score	Opposition Score	Opposition Score	Opposition Score	Opposition Score	Rank
Emmanuel Asante; Bernard Sam	Men's doubles	Bye	Lulu / Shing (VAN); W 3 - 1	Pang / Poh (SGP); L 0 - 3	Did not advance			
Derek Abrefa; Felix Lartey	Men's doubles	Bye	Drinkhall / Pitchford (ENG); L 0 - 3	Did not advance				
Celia Baah-Danso; Cynthia Kwabi	Women's doubles	—N/a	Chang / Tee (MAS); L 1 - 3	Did not advance				
Celia Baah-Danso; Bernard Sam	Mixed doubles	Wing / Yee (FIJ); W 3 - 0	Yan / Lay (AUS); L 0 - 3	Did not advance				
Cynthia Kwabi; Derek Abrefa	Mixed doubles	Chan Yook Fo / Kinoo (MRI); W 3 - 1	Medjugorac / Cote (CAN); L 0 - 3	Did not advance				

Team

Athletes	Event	Group stage			Round of 16	Quarterfinal	Semifinal	Final	Rank
Athletes	Event	Opposition Score	Opposition Score	Rank	Opposition Score	Opposition Score	Opposition Score	Opposition Score	Rank
Derek Abrefa; Emmanuel Asante; Felix Lartey; Bernard Sam	Men's team	England; L 0–3	Guyana; L 1-3	3	Did not advance				

== Weightlifting ==
Ghana participated with 4 athletes (3 men and 1 woman).

Athlete	Event	Snatch		Clean & jerk		Total	Rank
Athlete	Event	Result	Rank	Result	Rank	Total	Rank
Christian Amoah	Men's −85 kg	145	4	176	6	321	6
Forrester Osei	Men's −94 kg	153	5	180	5	333	5
Richmond Osarfo	Men's −105 kg	152	2	198	5	350	4
Ruth Baffoe	Women's −53 kg	77	5	88	11	165	10

== See also ==
- Ghana at the 2018 Winter Olympics
