= Sri Lanka at the 2018 Commonwealth Games =

- Flag of Sri Lanka
- CG code: SRI
- CGA: National Olympic Committee of Sri Lanka
- Website: srilankaolympic.org

in Gold Coast, Australia 4 April 2018 – 15 April 2018
- Competitors: 79 in 13 sports
- Flag bearer: Chinthana Vidanage
- Medals Ranked 31st: Gold 0 Silver 1 Bronze 5 Total 6

Commonwealth Games appearances (overview)
- 1938; 1950; 1954; 1958; 1962; 1966; 1970; 1974; 1978; 1982; 1986; 1990; 1994; 1998; 2002; 2006; 2010; 2014; 2018; 2022; 2026; 2030

Sri Lanka competed at the 2018 Commonwealth Games in the Gold Coast, Australia from April 4 to April 15, 2018.

The Sri Lankan team consists of 139 members, including 80 athletes competing in 13 sports (15 disciplines). However, Sumesh Wickramasinghe did not compete in athletics. The country made its Commonwealth Games debut in the discipline of rhythmic gymnastics and Canadian born Anna-Marie Ondaatje became the first gymnast to represent Sri Lanka at the Commonwealth Games. The team also consists of 38 officials.

Weightlifter Chinthana Vidanage was the country's flag bearer during the opening ceremony.

With six medals won, this edition of the games represented the most successful games for the country in terms of overall medals.

== Medalists ==
Medal	Name	Sport	Event	Date
Silver	Indika Dissanayake	Weightlifting	Men's 69 kg	April 6
Bronze	Chaturanga Lakmal	Weightlifting	Men's 56 kg	April 5
Bronze	Dinusha Gomes	Weightlifting	Women's 48 kg	April 5
Bronze	Anusha Koddithuwakku	Boxing	Women's 48 kg	April 11
Bronze	Thiwanka Ranasinghe	Boxing	Men's 49 kg	April 13
Bronze	Vidanalange Bandara	Boxing	Men's 52 kg	April 13

== Competitors ==
The following is the list of number of competitors participating at the Games per sport/discipline.

Sport	Men	Women	Total
Athletics (track and field)	7	5	12
Badminton	4	4	8
Beach volleyball	2	0	2
Boxing	3	3	6
Cycling	2	0	2
Diving	1	1	2
Gymnastics	0	4	3
Rugby sevens	12	0	12
Shooting	2	1	3
Squash	1	1	2
Swimming	4	2	6
Table tennis	3	3	6
Weightlifting	7	4	11
Wrestling	2	1	3
Total	50	29	79

== Athletics (track and field) ==
Sri Lanka received a quota of 14 athletes (eight men and six women). However, only 12 athletes were entered, with sprinter Rumeshika Rathnayake being added to the team later to make the total team size 13 (eight male and five female). However only 12 participated as Sumesh Wickramasinghe did not compete in the men's 4 × 100 m relay.

Men
Track & road events

Athlete	Event	Heat		Final	
Athlete	Event	Result	Rank	Result	Rank
Shehan Ambepitiya; Mohamed Ashrafu; Vinoj De Silva; Himasha Eashan	4 × 100 m relay	39.47	3 Q	39.08 NR	6

Field events

Athlete	Event	Qualification		Final	
Athlete	Event	Distance	Rank	Distance	Rank
Manjula Wijesekara	High jump	2.21	=9 q	NM	
Janaka Wimalasari	Long jump	7.84	10 q	7.89	7
Sampath Ranasinghe	Javelin throw	74.72	12 q	70.15	12

Women
Track & road events

Athlete	Event	Heat		Semifinal		Final	
Athlete	Event	Result	Rank	Result	Rank	Result	Rank
Rumeshika Rathnayake	200 m	23.43	2 Q	23.60	6	did not advance	
Nimali Arachchige	800 m	2:08.52	7	—N/a		did not advance	
Gayanthika Artigala Aberathna	800 m	2:04.72	8	—N/a		did not advance	
Hiruni Wijayaratne	Marathon	—N/a				2:49:38	11

Field events

Athlete	Event	Final	
Athlete	Event	Distance	Position
Dilhani Lekamge	Javelin throw	56.02	5

== Badminton ==
Sri Lanka participated with eight athletes (four men and four women).

Singles

Athlete	Event	Round of 64	Round of 32	Round of 16	Quarterfinal	Semifinal	Final / BM	
Athlete	Event	Opposition Score	Opposition Score	Opposition Score	Opposition Score	Opposition Score	Opposition Score	Rank
Buwaneka Goonethilleka	Men's	Murad Ali (PAK); W 2–0 (21–16, 21–19)	Emmanuel Donkor (GHA); W 2–0 (21–18, 24–22)	Ryan Ng (SGP); L 1–2 (9–21, 21–10, 21–19)	did not advance			
Dinuka Karunaratne	Men's	Kervin Ghislain (SEY); W 2–0 (21–7, 21–10)	Ciaran Chambers (NIR); W 2–0 (21–7, 21–8)	Julien Paul (MRI); W 2–0 (23–21, 22–20)	Prannoy H. S. (IND); L 0–2 (13–21, 6–21)	did not advance		
Niluka Karunaratne	Men's	Christopher Eynon (FAI); W 2–0 (21–8, 21–7)	Liam Fong (FIJ); W 2–0 (21–5, 21–6)	Srikanth Kidambi (IND); L 0–2 (10–21, 10–21)	did not advance			
Hasini Ambalangodage	Women's	Emily Temple Redshaw (JER); W 2–0 (21–18, 21–11)	Kate Foo Kune (MRI); L 0–2 (12–21, 12–21)	did not advance				

Doubles

Athlete	Event	Round of 64	Round of 32	Round of 16	Quarterfinal	Semifinal	Final / BM	
Athlete	Event	Opposition Score	Opposition Score	Opposition Score	Opposition Score	Opposition Score	Opposition Score	Rank
Sachin Dias; Buwaneka Goonethilleka	Men's	—N/a	Kalombo Mulenga / Chongo Mulenga (ZAM); W 2–0 (21–6, 21–9)	Matthew Bignell / Alexander Hutchings (JEY); W 2–0 (21–13, 21–13)	Jason Ho-Shue / Nyl Yakura (CAN); W 2–1 (19–21, 22–10, 21–17)	Satwiksairaj Rankireddy / Chirag Shetty (IND); L 0–2 (18–21, 10–21)	Goh V Shem / Tan Wee Kiong (MAS); L 0–2 (9–21, 13–21)	4
Thilini Hendahewa; Kavidi Sirimannage	Women's	—N/a	Palwasha Bashir / Mahoor Shahzad (PAK); W 2–0 (21–6, 21–15)	Michelle Butler-Emmett / Elsie de Villiers (RSA); W 2–0 (21–9, 21–9)	Lauren Smith / Sarah Walker (ENG); L 0–2 (12–21, 16–21)	did not advance		
Hasini Ambalangodage; Madushika Beruwelage	Women's	—N/a	Kimberley Clague / Cristen Marritt (IOM); W 2–0 (21–13, 21–9)	Aurélie Allet / Nicki Chan-Lam (MRI); W 2–0 (21–6, 21–9)	Ashwini Ponnappa / N. Sikki Reddy (IND); L 0–2 (11–21, 13–21)	did not advance		
Kavidi Sirimannage; Buwaneka Goonethilleka	Mixed	Abraham Ayittey / Gifty Mensah (GHA); W 2–0 (21–7, 21–9)	Alexander Dunn / Eleanor O'Donnell (SCO); L 0–2 (19–21, 17–21)	did not advance				
Thilini Hendahewa; Sachin Dias	Mixed	Edwin Ekiring / Shamim Bangi (UGA); W 2–0 (21–17, 21–9)	Alexander Hutchings / Elise Dixon (JER); W 2–0 (21–10, 21–11)	Terry Hee / Tan Wei Han (SGP); L 0–2 (21–23, 19–21)	did not advance			

Mixed team

Roster

- Hasini Ambalangodage
- Madushika Beruwelage
- Sachin Dias
- Buwaneka Goonethilleka
- Thilini Hendahewa
- Dinuka Karunaratna
- Niluka Karunaratne
- Kavidi Sirimannage

Pool A

Pos	Team	Pld	W	L	MF	MA	MD	GF	GA	GD	PF	PA	PD	Pts	Qualification
1	India	3	3	0	15	0	+15	30	1	+29	651	401	+250	3	Knockout stage
2	Scotland	3	2	1	9	6	+3	19	13	+6	592	476	+116	2	Knockout stage
3	Sri Lanka	3	1	2	5	10	−5	12	21	−9	526	619	−93	1	
4	Pakistan	3	0	3	1	14	−13	2	28	−26	348	621	−273	0	

Source: GC2018

India
5
Carrara Sports and Leisure Centre, Gold Coast
5 April

Sri Lanka
0

			1	2	3
1	(India) (Sri Lanka)	Pranav Chopra / Gadde Ruthvika Shivani; Sachin Dias / Thilini Hendahewa	21; 15	19; 21	22; 20
2	(India) (Sri Lanka)	Srikanth Kidambi; Niluka Karunaratne	21; 16	21; 10
3	(India) (Sri Lanka)	Satwiksairaj Rankireddy / Chirag Shetty; Dinuka Karunaratna / Buwaneka Goonethilleka	21; 17	21; 14
4	(India) (Sri Lanka)	Saina Nehwal; Madushika Beruwelage	21; 8	21; 4
5	(India) (Sri Lanka)	Ashwini Ponnappa / N. Sikki Reddy; Thilini Hendahewa / Kavidi Sirimannage	21; 12	21; 14

Scotland
4
Carrara Sports and Leisure Centre, Gold Coast
5 April

Sri Lanka
1

			1	2	3
1	(Scotland) (Sri Lanka)	Alexander Dunn / Eleanor O'Donnell; Sachin Dias / Thilini Hendahewa	17; 21	21; 16	25; 27
2	(Scotland) (Sri Lanka)	Kieran Merrilees; Niluka Karunaratne	21; 14	21; 17
3	(Scotland) (Sri Lanka)	Kirsty Gilmour; Hasini Ambalangodage	21; 4	21; 5
4	(Scotland) (Sri Lanka)	Alexander Dunn / Adam Hall; Niluka Karunaratne / Buwaneka Goonethilleka	21; 16	21; 16
5	(Scotland) (Sri Lanka)	Kirsty Gilmour / Julie MacPherson; Thilini Hendahewa / Kavidi Sirimannage	18; 21	21; 9	21; 9

Pakistan
1
Carrara Sports and Leisure Centre, Gold Coast
6 April

Sri Lanka
4

			1	2	3
1	(Pakistan) (Sri Lanka)	Irfan Saeed Bhatti / Palwasha Bashir; Buwaneka Goonethilleka / Kavidi Sirimannage	16; 21	4; 21
2	(Pakistan) (Sri Lanka)	Murad Ali; Dinuka Karunaratne	18; 21	17; 21
3	(Pakistan) (Sri Lanka)	Mahoor Shahzad; Madushika Dilrukshi	21; 14	21; 18
4	(Pakistan) (Sri Lanka)	Murad Ali / Irfan Saeed Bhatti; Buwaneka Goonethilleka / Sachin Dias	11; 21	14; 21
5	(Pakistan) (Sri Lanka)	Mahoor Shahzad / Palwasha Bashir; Thilini Hendahewa / Kavidi Sirimannage	7; 21	11; 21

== Beach volleyball ==
Sri Lanka qualified a men's beach volleyball team for a total of two athletes.

Athlete	Event	Preliminary round	Standing	Quarterfinals	Semifinals	Final / BM	
Athlete	Event	Opposition Score	Standing	Opposition Score	Opposition Score	Opposition Score	Rank
Asanka Pradeep; Sashimal Yapa	Men's	Pool B Miedzybrodzki – Cook (SCO); L 1–2 (15–21, 21–18, 14–16); Pedlow – Schachter (CAN); L 0–2 (11–21, 5–21); Kamara – Lombi (SLE); L 0–2 (17–21, 20–22)	4	did not advance			

== Boxing ==
Sri Lanka participated with a team of 6 athletes (3 men and 3 women). Anusha Koddithuwakku became the first Sri Lankan female boxer to secure a Commonwealth Games medal and also created history for becoming the first Sri Lankan female boxer to qualify for the semi-final round at a Commonwealth Games competition.

Athlete	Event	Round of 32	Round of 16	Quarterfinals	Semifinals	Final	Rank
Athlete	Event	Opposition Result	Opposition Result	Opposition Result	Opposition Result	Opposition Result	Rank
Thiwanka Ranasinghe	Men's −49 kg	—N/a	Siyabulela Mphongshi (RSA); W 4–0	Berry Namri (VAN); W 5–0	Galal Yafai (ENG); L RSC	Did not advance	3rd place, bronze medalist(s)
Vidanalange Bandara	Men's −52 kg	—N/a	Yachen Cook (NRU); W 3–2	Thabo Molefe (LES); W 4–1	Gaurav Solanki (IND); L 0–4	Did not advance	3rd place, bronze medalist(s)
Dinindu Saparamadu	Men's −64 kg	Bye	Richard Hadlow (NZL); W 4–1	Jonas Jonas (NAM); L 0–5	did not advance		
Anusha Koddithuwakku	Women's −48 kg	—N/a		Brandy Barnes (CAY); W RSC	Mary Kom (IND); L 0–5	Did not advance	3rd place, bronze medalist(s)
Dulani Jayasinghe	Women's −51 kg	—N/a		Christine Ongare (KEN); L RSC	did not advance		
Keshani Hansika	Women's −57 kg	—N/a	Bye	Alexis Pritchard (NZL); L 0–5	did not advance		

== Cycling ==
Sri Lanka's cycling team consisted of two athletes.

=== Road ===
Men

Athlete	Event	Time	Rank
Chamika Kumara	Road race	DNF	
Chamika Kumara	Time trial	1:00:48.02	45
Avishka Mawathage	Road race	DNF	
Avishka Mawathage	Time trial	58:48.27	39

== Diving ==
Sri Lanka participated with a team of 2 divers (1 man and 1 woman).

Athlete	Event	Preliminaries		Final	
Athlete	Event	Points	Rank	Points	Rank
Sahan Peiris	Men's 1 m springboard	181.25	15	did not advance	
Sahan Peiris	Men's 10 m platform	181.00	13	did not advance	
Yashoda De Silva	Women's 1 m springboard	117.90	14	did not advance	

== Gymnastics ==
=== Artistic ===
Sri Lanka participated with 3 athletes (3 women).

Women
Team Final & Individual Qualification

Athlete	Event	Apparatus				Total	Rank
Athlete	Event	V	UB	BB	F	Total	Rank
Ridma Bengalage	Team	11.850	8.250	8.700	9.650	38.450	29
Kaushini Gamage	Team	11.600	6.900	7.000	8.350	36.300	31
Amaya Kalukottage	Team	11.800	6.700	8.450	9.350	33.850	32
Total	Team	35.250	21.850	24.150	27.350	108.600	8

=== Rhythmic ===
Sri Lanka participated with 1 athlete (1 woman), marking its debut appearance in the discipline.

Individual Qualification

Athlete	Event	Apparatus				Total	Rank
Athlete	Event	Hoop	Ball	Clubs	Ribbon	Total	Rank
Anna-Marie Ondaatje	Qualification	10.800	11.675	12.050 Q	10.350	44.875	14 Q

Individual Finals

Athlete	Event	Apparatus				Total	Rank
Athlete	Event	Hoop	Ball	Clubs	Ribbon	Total	Rank
Anna-Marie Ondaatje	All-Around	11.800	11.750	10.400	10.350	44.300	11
Anna-Marie Ondaatje	Clubs	—N/a		11.200	—N/a	11.200	6

== Rugby sevens ==
=== Men's tournament ===
Sri Lanka qualified a men's rugby sevens team of 12 athletes, by being the highest ranked Commonwealth nation at the 2017 Asia Rugby Sevens Series.

Roster

The roster was officially named on March 30, 2018.

- Sudarshana Muthuthanthri
- Danushka Ranjan
- Richard Dharmapala
- Srinath Sooriyabandara
- Danush Dayan
- Hirantha Perera
- Tarinda Ratwatte
- Rehan Silva
- Sudam Sooriyarachchi
- Naveen Henakankanamage
- Adeesha Weeratunga
- Kavindu Perera

Pool D

Pos	Team	Pld	W	D	L	PF	PA	PD	Pts	Qualification
1	Fiji	3	3	0	0	138	22	+116	9	Semi-finals
2	Wales	3	2	0	1	90	38	+52	7	Classification semi-finals
3	Uganda	3	1	0	2	38	95	−57	5	
4	Sri Lanka	3	0	0	3	27	138	−111	3	

Source: GC2018
Rules for classification: 1) Points; 2) Head-to-head result; 3) Point difference; 4) Points scored.

14 April 2018
11:21

Fiji	63–5	Sri Lanka
Try: Naduva (2) 1' c, 10' c Mocenacagi (3) 4' c, 6' c, 8' c Kunatani 7' c Dranisinukula 11' c Nasilasila (2) 13' c, 14' c Con: Ravouvou (4/4) 2', 4', 6', 7'; Nasilasila (5/5) 8', 10', 12', 13', 14'	(Gold Coast 2018)	Try: Wijekoon 1' m Con: Ratwatte (0/1)

Robina Stadium, Gold Coast
Referee: Rasta Rasivhenge (South Africa)

14 April 2018
17:31

Wales	42–12	Sri Lanka
Try: Roach (2) 3' c, 12' c Thomas 4' c Williams 6' c Jenkins 7' c Davies 13' c Con: Davies (6/6) 3', 4', 6', 7', 12', 14'	(Gold Coast 2018)	Try: Wijekoon 1' c Sooriyabandara 9' m Con: Ratwatte (1/2) 1'

Robina Stadium, Gold Coast
Referee: Tevita Rokovereni (Fiji)

14 April 2018
21:11

Uganda	33–10	Sri Lanka
Try: Kisiga 1' m Wokorach 4' c Odongo 8' c Kasito 9' c Ogena 11' c Con: Wokorach (4/5) 4', 8', 10', 11'	(Gold Coast 2018)	Try: Wijekoon (2) 1' m, 7' m Con: Ratwatte (0/2)

Robina Stadium, Gold Coast
Referee: Richard Haughton (England)

== Shooting ==
Sri Lanka participated with 3 athletes (2 men and 1 woman).

Athlete	Event	Qualification		Final	
Athlete	Event	Points	Rank	Points	Rank
Thanthulage Fernando	Men's 50 metre pistol	509	16	did not advance	
Thanthulage Fernando	Men's 10 metre air pistol	563	9	did not advance	
Upul Wijerathna	Men's 50 metre pistol	508	18	did not advance	
Sanduni Perera	Women's 10 metre air rifle	404.2	15	did not advance	

== Squash ==
Sri Lanka participated in the squash competition with one male and one female athlete.

Athlete	Event	Round of 64	Round of 32	Round of 16	Quarterfinals	Semifinals	Final	Rank
Athlete	Event	Opposition Score	Opposition Score	Opposition Score	Opposition Score	Opposition Score	Opposition Score	Rank
Ravindu Laksiri	Men's Singles	Parshottam (FIJ); W 3–0	Lobban (SCO); L 0–3	did not advance				
Mihiliya Methsarani	Women's Singles	Bye	Landers-Murphy (NZL); L 0–3	did not advance				

== Swimming ==
Sri Lanka's swimming team consisted of six athletes (four men and two women).

Men

Athlete	Event	Heat		Semifinal		Final	
Athlete	Event	Time	Rank	Time	Rank	Time	Rank
Kyle Abeysinghe	50 m freestyle	23.73	27	did not advance			
Matthew Abeysinghe	50 m freestyle	22.65 NR	13 Q	22.84	15	did not advance	
Cherantha de Silva	50 m freestyle	24.29	36	did not advance			
Kyle Abeysinghe	100 m freestyle	52.20	35	did not advance			
Matthew Abeysinghe	100 m freestyle	49.11 NR	6 Q	49.43	10	did not advance	
Cherantha de Silva	100 m freestyle	52.08	34	did not advance			
Akalanka Peiris	50 m backstroke	26.83	11 Q	26.52 NR	10	did not advance	
Akalanka Peiris	100 m backstroke	58.68	18	did not advance			
Akalanka Peiris	200 m backstroke	2:11.56	20	—N/a		did not advance	
Cherantha de Silva	50 m butterfly	25.13	22	did not advance			
Akalanka Peiris	50 m butterfly	25.32	27	did not advance			
Cherantha de Silva	100 m butterfly	55.91	18	did not advance			
Cherantha de Silva	200 m butterfly	2:08.71	13	—N/a		did not advance	
Matthew Abeysinghe; Akalanka Peiris; Kyle Abeysinghe; Cherantha de Silva	4 × 100 m freestyle relay	3:22.84 NR	8 Q	—N/a		DSQ	

Women

Athlete	Event	Heat		Semifinal		Final	
Athlete	Event	Time	Rank	Time	Rank	Time	Rank
Vinoli Kaluarachchi	50 m freestyle	28.76	33	did not advance			
Vinoli Kaluarachchi	100 m freestyle	1:02.25	30	did not advance			
Vinoli Kaluarachchi	50 m backstroke	31.02	24	did not advance			
Vinoli Kaluarachchi	100 m backstroke	1:07.64	25	did not advance			
Dilrukshi Perera	50 m freestyle	27.75	25	did not advance			
Dilrukshi Perera	50 m butterfly	29.81 NR	22	did not advance			

== Table tennis ==
Sri Lanka participated with 6 athletes (3 men and 3 women).

Singles

Athletes	Event	Group Stage			Round of 64	Round of 32	Round of 16	Quarterfinal	Semifinal	Final	Rank
Athletes	Event	Opposition Score	Opposition Score	Rank	Opposition Score	Opposition Score	Opposition Score	Opposition Score	Opposition Score	Opposition Score	Rank
Buwaneka Jayasingha	Men's singles	Hodge (SKN); W 4–0	Tomlinson (JAM); W 4–3	1 Q	Bye	Rumgay (SCO); L 0–4	did not advance				
Rohan Sirisena	Men's singles	Rollins (BAH); W 4–0	Lulu (VAN); W 4–0	1 Q	Bernadet (CAN); L 1–4	did not advance					
Imesh Ranasingha	Men's singles	Mitchell (SVG); W 4–0	Cathcart (NIR); L 3–4	2	did not advance						
Hansani Kapugeekiyana	Women's singles	Ali (PAK); W 4–0	Yeung (CAN); W 4–1	1 Q	—N/a	Ho (ENG); L 0–4	did not advance				
Ishara Madurangi	Women's singles	Kinoo (MRI); W 4–1	Payet (ENG); L 1–4	2	—N/a	did not advance					
Erandi Warusawithana	Women's singles	Kwabi (GHA); W 4–0	Chung (TTO); L 0–4	2	—N/a	did not advance					

Doubles

Athletes	Event	Round of 64	Round of 32	Round of 16	Quarterfinal	Semifinal	Final	Rank
Athletes	Event	Opposition Score	Opposition Score	Opposition Score	Opposition Score	Opposition Score	Opposition Score	Rank
Buwaneka Jayasingha; Imesh Ranasingha	Men's doubles	Bye	Mtalaso / Tumaini (TAN); W 3–1	Kamal / Gnanasekaran (IND); L 0–3	did not advance			
Hansani Kapugeekiyana; Ishara Manikku Badu	Women's doubles	—N/a	Bye	Batra / Das (IND); L 0–3	did not advance			
Erandi Warusawithana; Buwaneka Jayasingha	Mixed doubles	Mutua / Thakkar (KEN); W 3–2	Shetty / Patkar (IND); L 0–3	did not advance				
Hansani Kapugeekiyana; Imesh Ranasingha	Mixed doubles	Choong / Lyne (MAS); L 0–3	did not advance					
Ishara Manikku Badu; Rohan Sirisena	Mixed doubles	Mtalaso / Pazi (TAN); W 3–1	Kamal / Das (IND); L 1–3	did not advance				

Team

Athletes	Event	Group Stage			Round of 16	Quarterfinal	Semifinal	Final	Rank
Athletes	Event	Opposition Score	Opposition Score	Rank	Opposition Score	Opposition Score	Opposition Score	Opposition Score	Rank
Buwaneka Jayasingha; Rohan Sirisena; Imesh Ranasingha	Men's team	Canada; L 1–3	Saint Vincent and the Grenadines; W 3–0	2 Q	Australia; L 0–3	did not advance			
Hansani Kapugeekiyana; Ishara Madurangi; Erandi Warusawithana	Women's team	India; L 0–3	Wales; L 1–3	3	—N/a	did not advance			

== Weightlifting ==
Sri Lanka competed in weightlifting. The Sri Lankan weightlifting team consisted of 11 athletes (seven men and four women).

Men

Athlete	Event	Snatch		Clean & Jerk		Total	Rank
Athlete	Event	Result	Rank	Result	Rank	Total	Rank
Chaturanga Lakmal	−56 kg	114	2	134	4	248	3rd place, bronze medalist(s)
Thilanka Palangasinghe	−62 kg	124	4	155	4	279	4
Indika Dissanayake	−69 kg	137	1	160	3	297	2nd place, silver medalist(s)
Chinthana Vidanage	−77 kg	132	4	166	5	298	5
Shanaka Peters	−94 kg	130	10	165	8	295	8
Saman Abeywickrama	−105 kg	130	11	160	9	290	9
Ushan Charuka	+105 kg	142	8	187	8	329	8

Women

Athlete	Event	Snatch		Clean & Jerk		Total	Rank
Athlete	Event	Result	Rank	Result	Rank	Total	Rank
Dinusha Gomes	−48 kg	70	4	85	6	155	3rd place, bronze medalist(s)
Chamari Warnakulasuriya	−53 kg	78	4	94	7	172	4
Nadeeshani Rajapaksha	−58 kg	66	11	94	7	160	10
Charhurika Balage	−75 kg	75	9	100	9	175	9

== Wrestling ==
Sri Lanka participated with 3 athletes (2 men and 1 woman).

Men

Athlete	Event	Round of 16	Quarterfinal	Semifinal	Repechage	Final / BM	
Athlete	Event	Opposition Result	Opposition Result	Opposition Result	Opposition Result	Opposition Result	Rank
Charles Fernando	-57 kg	Connelly (SCO); W 3–1	Bilal (PAK); L 1–4	did not advance			7
Suresh Fernando	-74 kg	Dodge (WAL); L 0 –5	did not advance				13

Women

Athlete	Event	Nordic Round Robin				Rank
Athlete	Event	Opposition Result	Opposition Result	Opposition Result	Opposition Result	Rank
Deepika Dilhani	-53 kg	Holland (AUS); W 3 –1	Kumari (IND); L 0–5	Weicker (CAN); L 0–4	Samuel (NGR); L 0–5	4

== See also ==
- Sri Lanka at the 2018 Asian Games
- Sri Lanka at the 2018 Summer Youth Olympics
