= Table tennis at the 2018 Commonwealth Games – Men's team =

Table tennis – Men's team at the 2018 Commonwealth Games
- Venue: Oxenford Studios
- Dates: 5–9 April 2018
- Nations: 18

Medalists
gold medal	Sharath Kamal; Anthony Amalraj; Harmeet Desai; Sathiyan Gnanasekaran; Sanil Shetty	India
silver medal	Bode Abiodun; Quadri Aruna; Azeez Jamiu; Olajide Omotayo; Segun Toriola	Nigeria
bronze medal	Paul Drinkhall; David McBeath; Liam Pitchford; Sam Walker	England

Table tennis men's team at the 2018 Commonwealth Games was held at the Oxenford Studios on the Gold Coast, Australia from April 5 to 9.

== Group stage ==
- 2 points were awarded for won tie, and 1 point for lost tie.

=== Group 1 ===
Team	Pld	TW	TL	MW	ML	GW	GL	PW	PL	Pts	Qualification
India	2	2	0	6	0	18	2	213	118	4	Knockout stage
Northern Ireland	2	1	1	3	4	11	13	188	205	3	Knockout stage
Trinidad and Tobago	2	0	2	1	6	4	19	158	236	2	

5 April 2018; 12:00	India	3–0	Trinidad and Tobago	Oxenford Studios, Gold Coast

report	Individual matches
Anthony Amalraj	3–1	Dexter St. Louis	11–5, 3–11, 11–2, 14–12
Sathiyan Gnanasekaran	3–0	Aaron Wilson	11–5, 11–5, 11–4
Harmeet Desai / Sathiyan Gnanasekaran	3–0	Yuvraj Dookram / Aaron Wilson	11–9, 11–9, 11–4

5 April 2018; 18:30	India	3–0	Northern Ireland	Oxenford Studios, Gold Coast

report	Individual matches
Sathiyan Gnanasekaran	3–0	Ashley Robinson	11–4, 11–6, 11–4
Sharath Kamal	3–0	Paul McCreery	11–6, 11–8, 11–4
Harmeet Desai / Sathiyan Gnanasekaran	3–1	Zak Wilson / Paul McCreery	11–2, 9–11, 11–5, 11–7

6 April 2018; 12:00	Northern Ireland	3–1	Trinidad and Tobago	Oxenford Studios, Gold Coast

report	Individual matches
Ashley Robinson	1–3	Dexter St. Louis	11–5, 5–11, 10–12, 6–11
Paul McCreery	3–0	Yuvraaj Dookram	11–3, 11–2, 11–6
Owen Cathcart / Paul McCreery	3–0	Aaron Wilson / Yuvraaj Dookram	11–9, 11–9, 11–5
Owen Cathcart	3–0	Dexter St. Louis	11–8, 11–9, 11–7

=== Group 2 ===
Team	Pld	TW	TL	MW	ML	GW	GL	PW	PL	Pts	Qualification
England	2	2	0	6	0	18	0	198	88	4	Knockout stage
Guyana	2	1	1	3	4	11	14	176	235	3	Knockout stage
Ghana	2	0	2	1	6	6	19	184	235	2	

5 April 2018; 12:00	England	3–0	Ghana	Oxenford Studios, Gold Coast

report	Individual matches
Paul Drinkhall	3–0	Derek Abrefa	11–8, 11–1, 11–8
Liam Pitchford	3–0	Felix Lartey	11–6, 11–6, 11–7
Samuel Walker / Paul Drinkhall	3–0	Bernard Sam / Derek Abrefa	11–4, 11–4, 11–4

5 April 2018; 18:30	England	3–0	Guyana	Oxenford Studios, Gold Coast

report	Individual matches
David McBeath	3–0	Shemar Britton	11–5, 11–5, 11–6
Samuel Walker	3–0	Christopher Franklin	11–4, 11–3, 11–4
Paul Drinkhall / David McBeath	3–0	Nigel Bryan / Shemar Britton	11–1, 11–7, 11–5

6 April 2018; 12:00	Guyana	3–1	Ghana	Oxenford Studios, Gold Coast

report	Individual matches
Nigel Bryan	1–3	Derek Abrefa	2–11, 11–9, 2–11, 10–12
Shemar Britton	3–1	Felix Lartey	11–8, 4–11, 11–9, 11–8
Christopher Franklin / Nigel Bryan	3–1	Bernard Sam / Derek Abrefa	11–9, 7–11, 11–6, 11–8
Christopher Franklin	3–0	Felix Lartey	12–10, 11–6, 11–7

=== Group 3 ===
Team	Pld	TW	TL	MW	ML	GW	GL	PW	PL	Pts	Qualification
Singapore	2	2	0	6	0	18	0	198	100	4	Knockout stage
Mauritius	2	1	1	3	5	12	18	251	269	3	Knockout stage
Barbados	2	0	1	2	6	9	21	217	197	2	

5 April 2018; 12:00	Singapore	3–0	Mauritius	Oxenford Studios, Gold Coast

report	Individual matches
Gao Ning	3–0	Akhilen Yogarajah	11–8, 11–5, 11–2
Pang Xue Jie	3–0	Rhikesh Taucoory	11–8, 11–4, 11–8
Ethan Poh Shao Feng / Pang Xue Jie	3–0	Brian Chan Yook Fo / Akhilen Yogarajah	11–5, 11–6, 11–7

5 April 2018; 18:30	Singapore	3–0	Barbados	Oxenford Studios, Gold Coast

report	Individual matches
Ethan Poh Shao Feng	3–0	Tyrese Knight	11–9, 11–6, 11–5
Pang Xue Jie	3–0	Mark Dowell	11–1, 11–8, 11–9
Pang Yew En Koen / Ethan Poh Shao Feng	3–0	Kristian Doughty / Mark Dowell	11–2, 11–3, 11–4

6 April 2018; 12:00	Barbados	2–3	Mauritius	Oxenford Studios, Gold Coast

report	Individual matches
Mark Dowell	3–2	Akhilen Yogarajah	8–11, 11–8, 7–11, 11–9, 11–8
Tyrese Knight	2–3	Brian Chan Yook Fo	7–11, 7–11, 11–7, 11–6, 6–11
Marcus Smith / Mark Dowell	0–3	Rhikesh Taucoory / Akhilen Yogarajah	1–11, 7–11, 10–12
Tyrese Knight	3–1	Rhikesh Taucoory	11–5, 11–9, 6–11, 11–7
Marcus Smith	1–3	Brian Chan Yook Fo	3–11, 4–11, 11–6, 5–11

=== Group 4 ===
Team	Pld	TW	TL	MW	ML	GW	GL	PW	PL	Pts	Qualification
Nigeria	2	2	0	6	1	18	3	242	162	4	Knockout stage
Malaysia	2	1	1	4	3	12	9	228	182	3	Knockout stage
Belize	2	0	2	0	6	0	18	72	198	2	

5 April 2018; 12:00	Nigeria	3–0	Belize	Oxenford Studios, Gold Coast

report	Individual matches
Olajide Omotayo	3–0	Rohit Pagarani	11–4, 11–2, 11–2
Bode Abiodun	3–0	Devesh Hukmani	11–5, 11–3, 11–2
Azeez Jamiu / Olajide Omotayo	3–0	Terry Su / Devesh Hukmani	11–6, 11–4, 11–5

5 April 2018; 18:30	Nigeria	3–1	Malaysia	Oxenford Studios, Gold Coast

report	Individual matches
Olajide Omotayo	3–0	Leong Chee Feng	13–11, 15–13, 11–7
Bode Abiodun	3–0	Ashraf Haiqal Rizal	11–5, 11–7, 13–11
Azeez Jamiu / Olajide Otomayu	0–3	Javen Choong / Leong Chee Feng	4–11, 9–11, 7–11
Azeez Jamiu	3–2	Ashraf Haiqal Rizal	11–7, 9–11, 11–5, 7–11, 11–8

6 April 2018; 12:00	Malaysia	3–0	Belize	Oxenford Studios, Gold Coast

report	Individual matches
Leong Chee Feng	3–0	Devesh Hukmani	11–8, 11–1, 11–4
Javen Choong	3–0	Rohit Pagarani	11–4, 11–4, 11–2
Ashraf Haiqal Rizal / Javen Choong	3–0	Terry Su / Devesh Hukmani	11–8, 11–2, 11–6

=== Group 5 ===
Team	Pld	TW	TL	MW	ML	GW	GL	PW	PL	Pts	Qualification
Australia	2	2	0	6	0	18	6	257	191	4	Knockout stage
Scotland	2	1	1	3	3	14	9	231	178	3	Knockout stage
Kiribati	2	0	2	0	6	1	18	90	209	2	

5 April 2018; 12:00	Australia	3–0	Kiribati	Oxenford Studios, Gold Coast

report	Individual matches
Trent Carter	3–1	Tauramoa Miita	11–6, 11–3, 11–13, 11–7
Heming Hu	3–0	Allie Johnny	11–6, 11–3, 11–5
Kane Townsend / Heming Hu	3–0	Nooa Takooa / Tauramoa Miita	11–8, 11–6, 11–2

5 April 2018; 18:30	Australia	3–0	Scotland	Oxenford Studios, Gold Coast

report	Individual matches
Yan Xin	3'–2	Craig Howieson	11–9, 11–9, 10–12, 11–13, 11–7
Hu Heming	3'–2	Gavin Rumgay	11–9, 6–11, 11–8, 11–13, 11–8
David Powell / Hu Heming	3'–1	Colin Dalgleish / Craig Howieson	11–9, 11–7, 10–12, 11–5

6 April 2018; 12:00	Scotland	3–0	Kiribati	Oxenford Studios, Gold Coast

report	Individual matches
Gavin Rumgay	3–0	Nooa Takooa	11–1, 11–1, 11–0
Colin Dalgleish	3–0	Allie Johnny	11–6, 11–3, 11–5
Craig Howieson / Colin Dalgleish	3–0	Tauramoa Miita / Nooa Takooa	11–7, 11–4, 11–4

=== Group 6 ===
Team	Pld	TW	TL	MW	ML	GW	GL	PW	PL	Pts	Qualification
Canada	2	2	0	6	1	19	4	240	120	4	Knockout stage
Sri Lanka	2	1	1	4	3	13	10	191	183	3	Knockout stage
Saint Vincent and the Grenadines	2	0	2	0	6	0	18	70	198	2	

5 April 2018; 12:00	Canada	3–0	Saint Vincent and the Grenadines	Oxenford Studios, Gold Coast

report	Individual matches
Eugene Wang	3–0	Carlton Daniel	11–1, 11–2, 11–4
Marko Medjugorac	3–0	Romano Spencer	11–4, 11–5, 11–3
Antoine Bernadet / Marko Medjugorac	3–0	Andre Mitchell / Romano Spencer	11–3, 11–2, 11–4

5 April 2018; 18:30	Canada	3–1	Sri Lanka	Oxenford Studios, Gold Coast

report	Individual matches
Eugene Wang	3–0	Rohan Manamendra Gedara	11–5, 11–7, 11–1
Marko Medjugorac	3–1	Imesh Ranasingha	7–11, 11–7, 11–8, 11–3
Antoine Bernadet / Marko Medjugorac	1–3	Buwaneka Jayasingha / Rohan Manamendra Gedara	9–11, 5–11, 11–5, 10–12
Eugene Wang	3–0	Buwaneka Jayasingha	11–3, 11–7, 11–1

6 April 2018; 12:00	Sri Lanka	3–0	Saint Vincent and the Grenadines	Oxenford Studios, Gold Coast

report	Individual matches
Rohan Manamendra Gedara	3–0	Romano Spencer	11–3, 11–6, 11–6
Imesh Ranasingha	3–0	Carlton Daniel	11–2, 11–7, 11–5
Buwaneka Jayasingha / Imesh Ranasingha	3–0	Andre Mitchell / Romano Spencer	11–1, 11–8, 11–4

== Knockout stage ==
=== Bracket ===
Round of 16
6 April
Scotland	1
Malaysia	3
6 April
Canada	3
Guyana	0
6 April
Sri Lanka	0
Australia	3
6 April
Northern Ireland	3
Mauritius	0

Quarterfinals
7 April
India	3
Malaysia	0
7 April
Canada	2
Singapore	3
7 April
Nigeria	3
Australia	1
7 April
Northern Ireland	0
England	3

Semifinals
9 April
India	3
Singapore	2
9 April
Nigeria	3
England	2

Final
9 April
India	3
Nigeria	0
Bronze medal
9 April
Singapore	0
England	3

=== Round of 16 ===
6 April 2018; 18:30	Scotland	1–3	Malaysia	Oxenford Studios, Gold Coast

report	Individual matches
Gavin Rumgay	2–3	Leong Chee Feng	10–12, 11–7, 11–8, 8–11, 10–12
Craig Howieson	0–3	Ashraf Haiqal Rizal	9–11, 4–11, 5–11
Colin Dalgleish / Craig Howieson	3–0	Javen Choong / Leong Chee Feng	11–7, 11–8, 12–10
Colin Dalgleish	0–3	Ashraf Haiqal Rizal	6–11, 13–15, 8–11

6 April 2018; 18:30	Canada	3–0	Guyana	Oxenford Studios, Gold Coast

report	Individual matches
Eugene Wang	3–0	Shemar Britton	11–7, 11–7, 11–2
Marko Medjugorac	3–0	Christopher Franklin	11–2, 11–7, 11–6
Antoine Bernadet / Marko Medjugorac	3–0	Nigel Bryan / Christopher Franklin	15–13, 11–5, 11–7

6 April 2018; 18:30	Sri Lanka	0–3	Australia	Oxenford Studios, Gold Coast

report	Individual matches
Rohan Manamendra Gedara	0–3	Heming Hu	11–13, 2–11, 5–11
Imesh Ranasingha	2–3	Yan Xin	11–8, 15–13, 5–11, 6–11, 6–11
Buwaneka Rajasingha / Rohan Manamendra Gedara	2–3	David Powell / Heming Hu
			11–6, 3–11, 5–11, 12–10, 2–11

6 April 2018; 18:30	Northern Ireland	3–0	Mauritius	Oxenford Studios, Gold Coast

report	Individual matches
Ashley Robinson	3–2	Brian Chan Yook Fo	11–6, 5–11, 8–11, 11–8, 11–5
Paul McCreery	3–1	Rhikesh Taucoory	11–8, 12–10, 15–17, 11–8
Owen Cathcart / Paul McCreery	3–0	Akhilen Yogarajah / Rhikesh Taucoory	11–8, 11–8, 11–8

=== Quarterfinals ===
7 April 2018; 12:00	India	3–0	Malaysia	Oxenford Studios, Gold Coast

report	Individual matches
Harmeet Desai	3–0	Leong Chee Feng	11–4, 12–10, 11–6
Sharath Kamal	3–0	Ashraf Haiqal Rizal	11–8, 11–7, 11–6
Sathiyan Gnanasekaran / Harmeet Desai	3–0	Javen Choong / Leong Chee Feng	11–7, 11–6, 11–7

7 April 2018; 12:00	Canada	2–3	Singapore	Oxenford Studios, Gold Coast

report	Individual matches
Marko Medjugorac	3–2	Pang Xue Jie	5–11, 11–8, 11–9, 9–11, 12–10
Eugene Wang	0–3	Gao Ning	8–11, 9–11, 5–11
Antoine Bernadet / Marko Medjugorac	1–3	Ethan Poh Shao Feng / Pang Xue Jie	6–11, 11–6, 7–11, 8–11
Eugene Wang	3–0	Ethan Poh Shao Feng	11–6, 11–7, 11–8
Antoine Bernadet	0–3	Gao Ning	6–11, 7–11, 4–11

7 April 2018; 16:00	Nigeria	3–1	Australia	Oxenford Studios, Gold Coast

report	Individual matches
Bode Abiodun	3–2	Heming Hu	11–9, 10–12, 11–4, 8–11, 11–8
Olajide Omotayo	1–3	Yan Xin	9–11, 11–6, 7–11, 8–11
Segun Toriola / Olajide Omotayo	3–0	David Powell / Heming Hu	11–7, 11–5, 11–7
Segun Toriola	3–1	Yan Xin	11–9, 12–14, 11–3, 11–6

7 April 2018; 18:00	Northern Ireland	0–3	England	Oxenford Studios, Gold Coast

report	Individual matches
Paul McCreery	1–3	Liam Pitchford	11–9, 9–11, 5–11, 7–11
Owen Cathcart	0–3	Paul Drinkhall	3−11, 5−11, 6−11
Ashley Robinson / Paul McCreery	0–3	Samuel Walker / Paul Drinkhall	6–11, 7–11, 8–11

=== Semifinals ===
9 April 2018; 09:30	India	3–2	Singapore	Oxenford Studios, Gold Coast

report	Individual matches
Harmeet Desai	0–3	Gao Ning	9–11, 5–11, 8–11
Sharath Kamal	3–0	Ethan Poh Shao Feng	11–5, 11–5, 11–4
Sathiyan Gnanasekaran / Harmeet Desai	3–1	Pang Xue Jie / Ethan Poh Shao Feng	8–11, 11–7, 11–9, 11–8
Sathiyan Gnanasekaran	1–3	Gao Ning	5–11, 12–10, 4–11, 11–13
Sharath Kamal	3–0	Pang Xue Jie	11–5, 12–10, 12–10

9 April 2018; 10:45	Nigeria	3–2	England	Oxenford Studios, Gold Coast

report	Individual matches
Segun Toriola	2–3	Paul Drinkhall	14–12, 9–11, 7–11, 13–11, 7–11
Bode Abiodun	3–2	Liam Pitchford	8–11, 9–11, 11–4, 13–11, 11–5
Olajide Omotayo / Segun Toriola	3–1	Samuel Walker / Paul Drinkhall	2–11, 11–7, 12–10, 11–7
Olajide Omotayo	2–3	Liam Pitchford	11–9, 4–11, 8–11, 11–9, 5–11
Bode Abiodun	3–2	Samuel Walker	8–11, 11–9, 11–9, 6–11, 11–8

=== Bronze medal ===
9 April 2018; 16:55	Singapore	0–3	England (bronze)	Oxenford Studios, Gold Coast

report	Individual matches
Gao Ning	0–3	Paul Drinkhall	11-13, 5-11, 9-11
Ethan Poh Shao Feng	1–3	Liam Pitchford	9-11, 7-11, 11-7, 3-11
Pang Xue Jie / Ethan Poh Shao Feng	2–3	David McBeath / Paul Drinkhall	11-6, 13-11, 4-11, 9-11, 11-13

=== Final ===
9 April 2018; 18:30	India (gold)	3–0	Nigeria (silver)	Oxenford Studios, Gold Coast

report	Individual matches
Sharath Kamal	3–1	Bode Abiodun	4-11, 11-5, 11-4, 11-9
Sathiyan Gnanasekaran	3–1	Segun Toriola	10-12, 11-3, 11-3, 11-4
Harmeet Desai / Sathiyan Gnanasekaran	3–0	Olajide Omotayo / Bode Abiodun	11-8, 11-5, 11-3
