= Weightlifting at the 2018 Commonwealth Games – Men's 94 kg =

Weightlifting – Men's 94 kg at the 2018 Commonwealth Games
- Venue: Carrara Sports and Leisure Centre
- Dates: 8 April 2018
- Competitors: 14 from 14 nations
- Winning total weight: 370

Medalists
gold medal	Steven Kari	Papua New Guinea
silver medal	Boady Santavy	Canada
bronze medal	Vikas Thakur	India

The Men's 94 kg weightlifting event at the 2018 Commonwealth Games took place at the Carrara Sports and Leisure Centre on 8 April 2018. The weightlifter from Papua New Guinea won the gold, with a combined lift of 370 kg.

== Records ==
Prior to this competition, the existing world, Commonwealth and Games records were as follows:

World record	Snatch	Akakios Kakiasvilis (GRE)	188 kg	Athens, Greece	27 November 1999
World record	Clean & Jerk	Sohrab Moradi (IRI)	233 kg	Anaheim, United States	3 December 2017
World record	Total	Sohrab Moradi (IRI)	417 kg	Anaheim, United States	3 December 2017
Commonwealth record	Snatch	Aleksander Karapetyan (AUS)	182.5 kg	Antalya, Turkey	9 November 2001
Commonwealth record	Clean & Jerk	Aleksander Karapetyan (AUS)	210 kg	Antalya, Turkey	9 November 2001
Commonwealth record	Total	Aleksander Karapetyan (AUS)	392.5 kg	Antalya, Turkey	9 November 2001
Games record	Snatch	Aleksander Karapetyan (AUS)	167.5 kg	Manchester, England	2 August 2002
Games record	Clean & Jerk	Kiril Kounev (AUS)	205 kg	Kuala Lumpur, Malaysia	18 September 1998
Games record	Total	Kiril Kounev (AUS)	370 kg	Kuala Lumpur, Malaysia	18 September 1998

The following records were established during the competition:

Snatch	168 kg	Boady Santavy (CAN)	GR
Clean & Jerk	216 kg	Steven Kari (PNG)	CR, GR

== Schedule ==
All times are Australian Eastern Standard Time (UTC+10)

Date	Time	Round
Sunday, 8 April 2018	14:12	Final

== Results ==
Rank	Athlete	Body weight (kg)	Snatch (kg)				Clean & Jerk (kg)				Total
Rank	Athlete	Body weight (kg)	1	2	3	Result	1	2	3	Result	Total
1st place, gold medalist(s)	Steven Kari (PNG)	93.87	154	~~158~~	~~158~~	154	202	216	~~217~~	216 CR / GR	370
2nd place, silver medalist(s)	Boady Santavy (CAN)	92.30	160	161	168	168 GR	196	201	~~206~~	201	369
3rd place, bronze medalist(s)	Vikas Thakur (IND)	92.68	152	156	159	159	192	~~200~~	~~200~~	192	351
4	Edmon Avetisyan (ENG)	93.73	150	~~154~~	~~157~~	150	184	190	~~195~~	190	340
5	Forrester Osei (GHA)	92.98	150	153	~~155~~	153	~~180~~	180	~~185~~	180	333
6	Petit Minkoumba (CMR)	93.62	~~135~~	138	142	142	170	175	~~180~~	175	317
7	Scott Wilson (SCO)	92.44	135	140	~~145~~	140	~~166~~	166	171	171	311
8	Shanaka Peters (SRI)	93.90	125	130	~~136~~	130	165	~~170~~	~~170~~	165	295
9	Stephen Forbes (NIR)	92.11	122	127	~~131~~	127	145	150	~~154~~	150	277
10	Kalidi Batuusa (UGA)	92.93	~~120~~	120	~~127~~	120	147	155	~~160~~	155	275
11	James Adede (KEN)	92.60	~~117~~	117	120	120	151	~~155~~	~~155~~	151	271
	Siaosi Leuo (SAM)	93.59	151	156	~~159~~	156	~~200~~	~~200~~	~~200~~	–	–
	Usman Amjad Rathore (PAK)	93.96	~~150~~	~~150~~	150	150	~~175~~	~~175~~	~~175~~	–	–
	Joshua Parry (WAL)	93.67	~~125~~	125	~~130~~	125	~~160~~	~~160~~	-	–	DNF
