= Boxing at the 2018 Commonwealth Games – Men's light flyweight =

Boxing competitions

Boxing – Men's light flyweight at the 2018 Commonwealth Games
- Venue: Oxenford Studios
- Dates: 6 – 14 April 2018
- Competitors: 12 from 12 nations

Medalists
gold medal	Galal Yafai	England
silver medal	Amit Panghal	India
bronze medal	Thiwanka Ranasinghe	Sri Lanka
bronze medal	Juma Miiro	Uganda

The men's light flyweight boxing competitions at the 2018 Commonwealth Games in Gold Coast, Australia took place between 6 and 14 April at Oxenford Studios. Light flyweights were limited to those boxers weighing less than 49 kilograms (108.02 lbs).

Like all Commonwealth boxing events, the competition was a straight single-elimination tournament. Both semifinal losers were awarded bronze medals, so no boxers competed again after their first loss. Bouts consisted of three rounds of three minutes each, with one-minute breaks between rounds. Beginning this year, the competition was scored using the "must-ten" scoring system.

== Schedule ==
The schedule is as follows:

All times are Australian Eastern Standard Time (UTC+10)

Date	Time	Round
Friday 6 April 2018	12:02 & 18:32	Round of 16
Tuesday 10 April 2018	12:02	Quarter-finals
Friday 13 April 2018	12:02	Semi-finals
Saturday 14 April 2018	12:02	Final

== Results ==
The draw is as follows:

Round of 16
Siyabulela Mphongshi (RSA)	0
Thiwanka Ranasinghe (SRI)	4
Simplice Fotsala (CMR)	0
Galal Yafai (ENG)	5
Mathias Hamunyela (NAM)	2
Shaffi Hassan (KEN)	3
Tetteh Sulemanu (GHA)	0
Amit Panghal (IND)	5

Quarterfinals
Berry Namri (VAN)	0
Thiwanka Ranasinghe (SRI)	5
Galal Yafai (ENG)	ABD
Sharvin Beedassee (MRI)
Juma Miiro (UGA)	3
Shaffi Hassan (KEN)	2
Amit Panghal (IND)	4
Aqeel Ahmed (SCO)	1

Semifinals
Thiwanka Ranasinghe (SRI)
Galal Yafai (ENG)	RSC
Juma Miiro (UGA)	0
Amit Panghal (IND)	5

Final
Galal Yafai (ENG)	3
Amit Panghal (IND)	1
