= Boxing at the 2018 Commonwealth Games – Men's light welterweight =

Boxing competitions

Boxing – Men's light welterweight at the 2018 Commonwealth Games
- Venue: Oxenford Studios
- Dates: 5 – 14 April 2018
- Competitors: 22 from 22 nations

Medalists
gold medal	Jonas Jonas	Namibia
silver medal	Thomas Blumenfeld	Canada
bronze medal	Luke McCormack	England
bronze medal	Jesse Lartey	Ghana

The men's light welterweight boxing competitions at the 2018 Commonwealth Games in Gold Coast, Australia took place between 5 and 14 April at Oxenford Studios. Light welterweights were limited to those boxers weighing less than 64 kilograms.

Like all Commonwealth boxing events, the competition was a straight single-elimination tournament. Both semifinal losers were awarded bronze medals, so no boxers competed again after their first loss. Bouts consisted of three rounds of three minutes each, with one-minute breaks between rounds. Beginning this year, the competition was scored using the "must-ten" scoring system.

== Schedule ==
The schedule is as follows:

All times are Australian Eastern Standard Time (UTC+10)

Date	Time	Round
Thursday 5 April 2018	12:32 & 19:02	Round of 32
Sunday 8 April 2018	12:02 & 18:32	Round of 16
Tuesday 10 April 2018	13:02	Quarter-finals
Friday 13 April 2018	13:32	Semi-finals
Saturday 14 April 2018	12:47	Final

== Results ==
The draw is as follows:

Round of 32
Alston Ryan (ANT)	0
William Edwards (WAL)	5
Jone Davule (FIJ)	0
Louis Colin (MRI)	5
Colin Lewis (GUY)	4
Nathan Ferrari (LCA)	1
Edrian Volcere (SEY)	1
Richard Hadlow (NZL)	4
Jonas Jonas (NAM)	5
Rashield Williams (BAH)	0
Luke McCormack (ENG)	5
Kavuma Ssemujju (UGA)	0

Round of 16
Nkumbu Silungwe (ZAM)	5
William Edwards (WAL)	0
Thomas Blumenfeld (CAN)	5
Robbie McKechnie (SCO)	0
Jesse Lartey (GHA)	3
Louis Colin (MRI)	2
Colin Lewis (GUY)	1
Sinethemba Blom (RSA)	4
Dinindu Saparamadu (SRI)	4
Richard Hadlow (NZL)	1
Jonas Jonas (NAM)	RSC
Valentin Kondakov (SAM)
John Ume (PNG)	0
Liam Wilson (AUS)	5
Luke McCormack (ENG)	4
Seán McComb (NIR)	1

Quarterfinals
Nkumbu Silungwe (ZAM)	0
Thomas Blumenfeld (CAN)	5
Jesse Lartey (GHA)	3
Sinethemba Blom (RSA)	2
Dinindu Saparamadu (SRI)	0
Jonas Jonas (NAM)	5
Liam Wilson (AUS)	0
Luke McCormack (ENG)	5

Semifinals
Thomas Blumenfeld (CAN)	5
Jesse Lartey (GHA)	0
Jonas Jonas (NAM)	3
Luke McCormack (ENG)	2

Final
Thomas Blumenfeld (CAN)	0
Jonas Jonas (NAM)	5
