= Thomas Blumenfeld =

Canadian boxer (born 1997)

Personal information
- Other names: The Bullet
- Born: Thomas Robert Maxwell Blumenfeld; 26 December 1997 (age 28) Fleurimont, Quebec, Canada
- Weight: Light-welterweight

Boxing career
- Stance: Southpaw

Boxing record
- Total fights: 11
- Wins: 11
- Win by KO: 10
Medal record
Men's amateur boxing
Representing Canada
Commonwealth Games
Silver medal – second place	2018 Gold Coast	Light-welterweight

Thomas Blumenfeld (born 1997) is a Canadian professional boxer. Born in Fleurimont, Quebec, Canada, he grew up in Springfield, Vermont, USA, after his family moved there when he was three years old. Blumenfeld took up boxing aged eight having been inspired by the chance discovery of a pair of old boxing gloves which had belonged to his father. As an amateur, he represented Canada 150 times between 2016 and 2022 including winning a silver medal in the light-welterweight division at the 2018 Commonwealth Games. Blumenfeld turned professional in June 2022.
