= Liam Pitchford =

British table tennis player (born 1993)

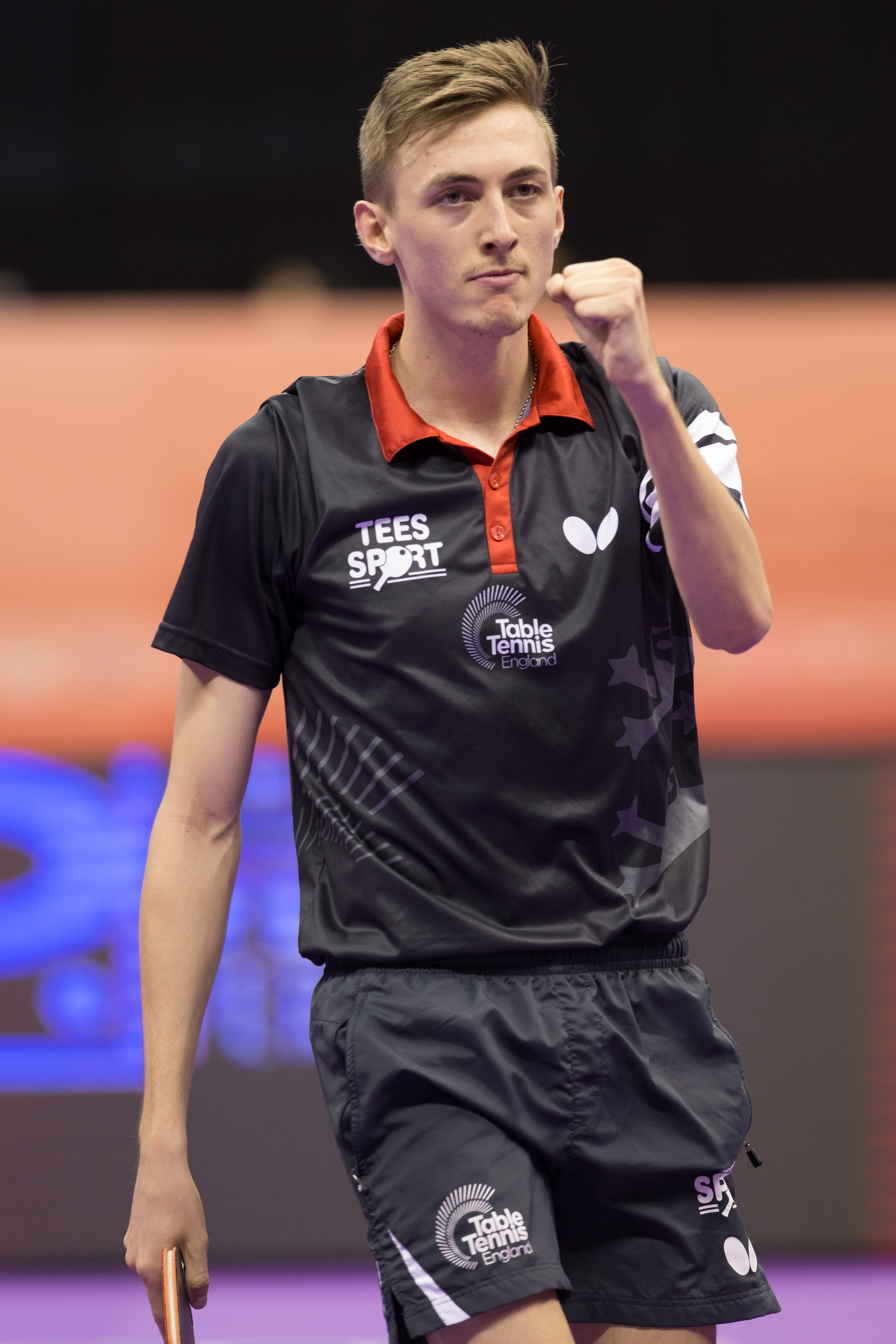
- Pitchford in 2016

Personal information
- Full name: Liam Benjamin Pitchford
- Born: 12 July 1993 (age 33) Chesterfield, England
- Height: 1.85 m (6 ft 1 in)
- Weight: 70 kg (154 lb)

Sport
- Sport: Table tennis
- Playing style: Shakehand, Offensive
- Equipment: JOOLA Zhou Qihao Hyper ARY-c 90 (blade), JOOLA Dynaryz ZGR (FH), JOOLA Dynaryz ZGX (BH)
- Highest ranking: 12 (August 2019)
- Current ranking: 339 (28 September 2026)
Medal record
Men's table tennis
Representing England
World Championships
Bronze medal – third place	2016 Kuala Lumpur	Team
World Cup
Bronze medal – third place	2018 London	Team
Commonwealth Games
Gold medal – first place	2018 Gold Coast	Men's doubles
Gold medal – first place	2022 Birmingham	Men's doubles
Silver medal – second place	2010 Delhi	Team
Silver medal – second place	2014 Glasgow	Team
Silver medal – second place	2014 Glasgow	Mixed doubles
Silver medal – second place	2018 Gold Coast	Mixed doubles
Silver medal – second place	2022 Birmingham	Men's singles
Bronze medal – third place	2010 Delhi	Men's doubles
Bronze medal – third place	2014 Glasgow	Men's singles
Bronze medal – third place	2018 Gold Coast	Team
Bronze medal – third place	2022 Birmingham	Men's team
Europe Top-16
Bronze medal – third place	2023 Montreux	Singles

Liam Benjamin Pitchford (born 12 July 1993) is an English table tennis player. He is sponsored by JOOLA.

== Career ==
Pitchford began playing table tennis when he was eight years old. He won the British Home Countries Championship in 2009, and two Commonwealth Games medals in 2010 (Silver in Team and Bronze in Doubles).

In the summer of 2011, he transferred to German club TTF Liebherr Ochsenhausen in the top division, the Bundesliga, having played for second division club FC Tegernheim the previous season. From 2009 to 2010 Pitchford played for Aarhus BTK in the best Danish league. In July 2014, his contract with Ochsenhausen was extended by three years.

In the autumn of 2011, he beat World number nine Vladimir Samsonov and World junior number three Wu Jiaji in international competitions, paving his route to becoming number one in the English rankings in November 2011. He finished the year with a career-high World ranking of 171 to become the third highest-ranked British player on the ITTF World Ranking list, and was subsequently part of the Team GB squad for the London Olympics in 2012.

Pitchford has won national singles titles at U14, Cadet, U21 and Senior levels, and doubles titles at U14, Cadet, Junior and Senior levels. He is the reigning men's singles national champion (March 2015).

In 2014 he was part of the England men's team which clinched promotion to the top level of world table tennis at the World Team Championships in Japan.

Pitchford represented England at the 2014 Commonwealth Games in Glasgow, winning a silver medal in the team competition as Singapore took gold in a repeat of the 2010 result. He also won a silver medal alongside Tin-Tin Ho in the mixed doubles, and won the bronze medal in the men's singles. In August 2014, he reached a career-high ranking of No. 44 in the ITTF world rankings.

At the 2015 World Table Tennis Championships, Pitchford showed growth by reaching the round of 32 in men's singles. He beat two-time World Cup runner-up Kalinikos Kreanga and world number 20 Tiago Apolonia before losing to South Korean Joo Sae-hyuk.

In June 2015, Pitchford was part of the Great Britain table tennis squad at the inaugural European Games in Baku, where he reached the quarter-finals.

In March 2016, Pitchford was part of the England team, alongside Paul Drinkhall and Sam Walker, which won bronze medals at the World Team Championships in Malaysia, England's first medal at that level since 1983 and the first time a newly promoted team had earned a podium place at the event.

Pitchford competed for Team GB in the singles and team events at the Rio 2016 Olympics. He reached the last 32 in the singles and, alongside Paul Drinkhall and Sam Walker, beat France to reach the quarter-finals of the team event, where GB were beaten by China.

In July 2017, Pitchford helped the Falcons team to win the inaugural Ultimate Table Tennis league in India.

In February 2018, Pitchford was part of the England squad alongside Paul Drinkhall, Sam Walker, David McBeath, and Tom Jarvis which won bronze medals by reaching the semi-finals of the ITTF Team World Cup in front of a home crowd at the Copper Box Arena in London.

At the Commonwealth Games in Australia in 2018, Pitchford won the gold medal in the men's doubles alongside Paul Drinkhall, the silver medal in the mixed doubles alongside Tin-Tin Ho and was part of the England squad which won men's team bronze, alongside Drinkhall, Sam Walker and David McBeath.

At the 2018 Bulgaria Open, Pitchford beat current Olympic and World champion Ma Long in the first round in a 7 set match, arguably the biggest win of his career. However, in the next round he lost to Ma Long's Chinese teammate Ma Te.

That victory, and a series of other notable wins, saw Pitchford break into the world's top 20 for the first time in December 2018, at No 16. The ranking peaked at No 12 in August 2019.

In November 2019, Pitchford reached the last 16 of the Austrian Open losing 4–0 to the German player Timo Boll. In the last 32, Pitchford defeated 2016 Olympic Bronze medalist Jun Mizutani 4–3.

At the 2020 Qatar Open, Pitchford reached the final. Pitchford began with a tense 4–2 win over Spain's Álvaro Robles and followed it up with another 4–2 victory over the evergreen Vladimir Samsonov who had just upset the fourth seed Lin Gaoyuan in the previous round. In the quarterfinal, Pitchford accounted for the in-form Chinese Taipei legend Chuang Chih-yuan. But it was the semifinal that proved to be the match of the tournament. In a thrilling six game encounter, dishing out one of the best performances of his life, Pitchford beat the reigning world number one, Xu Xin, an opponent Pitchford had never managed to take a game off before. The final against Fan Zhendong was a spectacular affair and Xiao Pang certainly had to dig deep to eventually overcome Pitchford in a nail-biting 4–2 match. At the same event, Pitchford and Paul Drinkhall reached the men's doubles final, losing to China's Ma Long and Xu Xin.

=== 2021 ===
In 2021, one week before the World Table Tennis inaugural event WTT Doha, Liam Pitchford suffered a minor hand injury while looping a half-long ball in practice. As a result, he felt pain whenever he used his backhand and suffered an early first-round upset to Andrea Levenko in the first WTT Contender event and a round-of-32 upset to Kristian Karlsson in the second WTT Star Contender Event.

Pitchford was upset by Darko Jorgic in the round of 32 in the men's singles event at the Tokyo Olympics.

=== 2022 ===
At the Birmingham 2022 Commonwealth Games, Pitchford and Paul Drinkhall successfully defended their men's doubles title. Pitchford also reached the men's singles final, where he was beaten by Sharath Kamal Achanta of India. He, Drinkhall, Sam Walker and Tom Jarvis won bronze in the men's team event.

2024

Pitchford became the first British table tennis athlete to appear at four Olympic Games when he competed at Paris 2024. He was defeated in the round of 32 by 13th seed Darko Jorgic.

Major League Table Tennis

Pitchford was selected as the No. 1 overall pick by the Florida Crocs in the 2024 Major League Table Tennis Draft. He made his league debut in September 2024 during the opening weekend in Portland, Oregon. In his first match against the Bay Area Blasters, Pitchford won the point in the "Golden Game" to secure a 14–7 victory for the Crocs.

During the 2024–25 season, Pitchford recorded a 64.4% singles win percentage with a 29–16 game record and a 46.7% doubles win percentage. He also recorded a 51.5% win rate in Golden Game points. Following the conclusion of the season, he was named a finalist for the MLTT Season 2 Most Valuable Player award.

In September 2025, it was announced that Pitchford would miss the start of the 2025–26 season (Season 3) due to a right hip injury requiring surgery. He was subsequently placed on the league's injured reserve list. On 1 December 2025, he underwent a hip resurfacing operation in London.

2025

In March 2025, Pitchford won his seventh national Men's Singles title.

In April 2025, Pitchford won the Men's Singles at WTT Feeder Manchester, becoming the first English player to win a WTT singles title.

== See also ==
- List of England players at the World Team Table Tennis Championships
