= Sam Walker (table tennis) =

English table tennis player

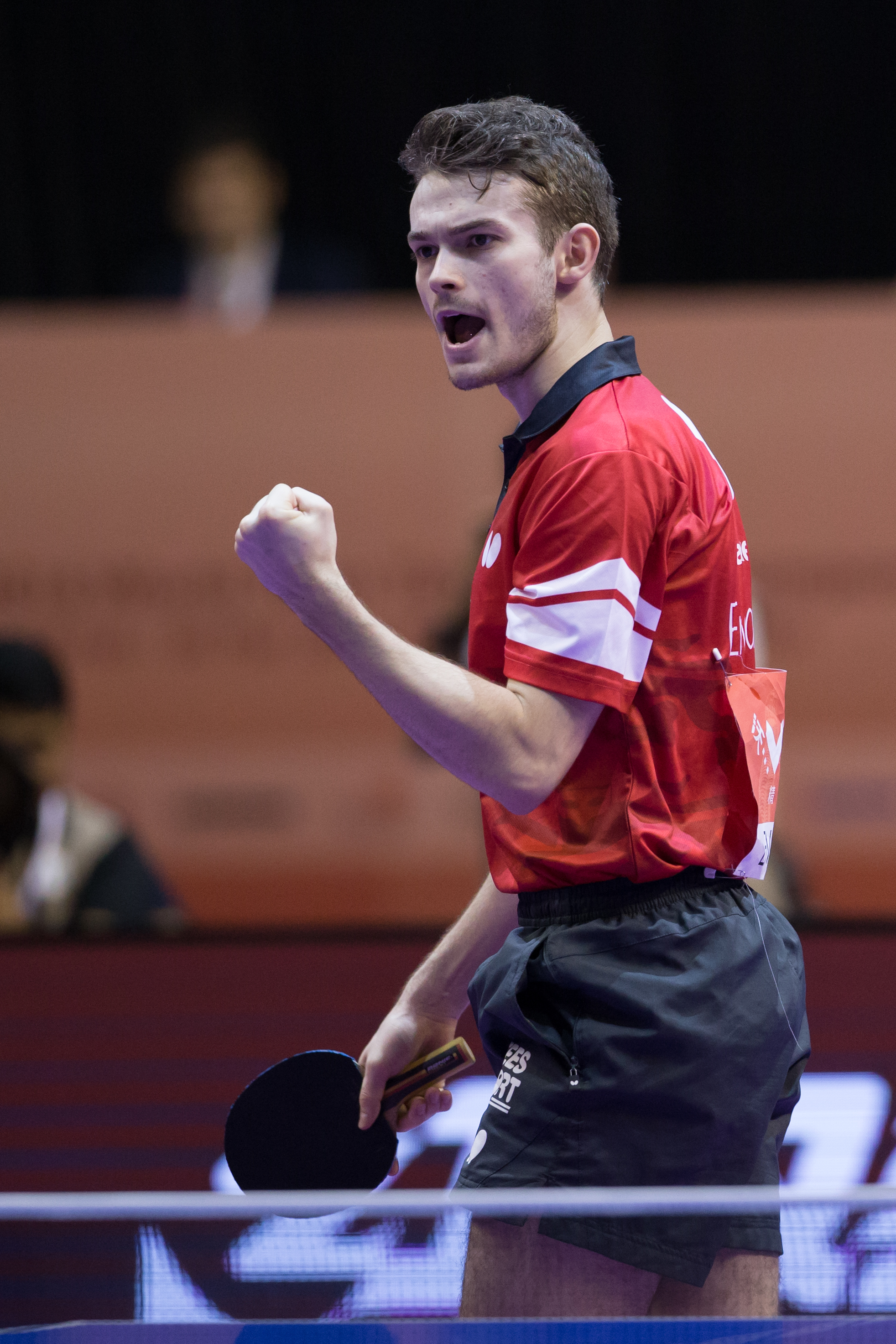
- Walker in 2016

Personal information
- Full name: Samuel Jake Walker
- Born: 7 May 1995 (age 31) Sutton in Ashfield, Nottinghamshire, England
- Height: 1.83 m (6 ft 0 in)
- Weight: 72 kg (159 lb)

Sport
- Sport: Table tennis
- Highest ranking: 80 (January 2018)
- Current ranking: 117 (2 November 2026)
Medal record
Men's table tennis
Representing England
World Championships
Bronze medal – third place	2016 Kuala Lumpur	Team
World Cup
Bronze medal – third place	2018 London	Team
Commonwealth Games
Silver medal – second place	2014 Glasgow	Team
Bronze medal – third place	2018 Gold Coast	Team
Bronze medal – third place	2022 Birmingham	Men's team

Samuel Jake Walker (born 7 May 1995) is a British table tennis player.

== Career ==
Walker competed for England in the men's team event at the 2014 Commonwealth Games where he won a silver medal.

In March 2016, Walker was part of the England team, alongside Liam Pitchford and Paul Drinkhall, which won bronze medals at the World Team Championships in Malaysia, England's first medal at that level since 1983 and the first time a newly promoted team had earned a podium place at the event.

In June 2016, Walker was called up to the Team GB table tennis squad for the Rio Olympic Games. He featured in the team competition, sealing a 3–2 victory over France in the first round before GB were knocked out by China in the quarter-finals.

In February 2018, Walker was part of the England squad alongside Paul Drinkhall, Liam Pitchford, David McBeath and Tom Jarvis which won bronze medals by reaching the semi-finals of the ITTF Team World Cup in front of a home crowd at the Copper Box Arena in London.

At the Commonwealth Games in Australia in 2018, Walker was part of the England squad which won men's team bronze, alongside Paul Drinkhall, Liam Pitchford and David McBeath. and was fourth in the men's singles, having been defeated in the bronze medal match.

In 2021, Walker became the first English player to win a doubles title on the international circuit since the advent of the ITTF World Tour in 1996, when he and Sweden's Truls Moregard won the men's doubles at the Czech Open.

At the Birmingham 2022 Commonwealth Games, Walker won team bronze alongside Liam Pitchford, Paul Drinkhall and Tom Jarvis. In 2024, he won a 2nd men's doubles and 6th mixed doubles title at the English National Table Tennis Championships, held at the David Ross Sports Village in Nottingham.

In April 2025, Walker & Paul Drinkhall won the Men's Doubles at WTT Feeder Manchester, becoming the first English pair to win a WTT doubles title.

== See also ==
- List of England players at the World Team Table Tennis Championships
