= Derek Abrefa =

Ghanaian table tennis player

Personal information
- Full name: Derek Tawiah Abrefa
- Nationality: Ghana
- Born: 15 February 1992 Berekum, Ghana

Sport
- Sport: Table tennis
- Playing style: Right-handed, Shakehand grip (offensive)
- Highest ranking: 206 (October 2018)
- Current ranking: 419 (May 2023)

Derek Tawiah Abrefa (born 15 February 1992) is a Ghanaian born table tennis player. He started playing table tennis when he was in Presbyterian Senior High School, Osu as a student and junior national champion. Derek being a junior ping pong player represented Ghana at the Africa Junior Championship in Alexandria, Egypt and the All African Games in Algiers, Algeria in 2007.

Abrefa is a two-time bronze medallist at the All Africa Games and Commonwealth and currently ranked number 1 in Ghana by the Ghana Table Tennis Federation. He is currently ranked 278 in the world by the International Table Tennis Federation (ITTF).

== Career ==
Abrefa started off as a junior ping pong player in the Africa Junior Championship in Alexandria, Egypt and the All African Games in Algiers, Algeria in 2007.

In 2008 he won gold and silver medals in the African Championship in Côte d'Ivoire. He was part of the team representing Ghana at the 2018 Commonwealth Games in Gold Coast, Australia. During the commonwealth games in Gold Coast, Australia Derek has made the men's single match where he beat Sierra Leone's Emmanuel Gboyah in four straight sets, (11–5, 11–1, 11–4, 11–5).

He also represented Ghana at the 2019 African Games in Rabat Morocco and he was appointed the general team captain and was the flag bearer during the opening ceremony.

More recently Abrefa won the GTTA Grandmaster Championship Men's Singles, which consisted of the Top 10 players in Ghana. He defeated Felix Lartey in the Finals.

== Career Records ==
He came first place in the January Westchester Open in the U2500 rating. He also won bronze medals for Ghana at the All African Games in Brazzaville Congo in 2015.

Derek in May 2023 participated in the London Grand Prix Table Tennis tournament as he won a silver medal in the Men's Band 1 and bronze medal in a Men's Singles.

== Honours ==
=== National ===
- 2x National Juniors Champion
- 13x National Seniors Champion
- 2x Ghana University Games Champion

=== International ===
- 2x African Zone '3' Juniors Champion
- London Grand Prix (Runner-Up, 2nd Band 2)
- London Grand Prix Open Restricted (Bronze, 3rd)

== Awards ==
Derek has won six times the Sports Writers Association of Ghana (SWAG) National Best Table Tennis Player Award Winner in 2010, 2013, 2014, 2015, 2016 and 2018 respectively.

== Philanthropic Works ==
Derek embarked on a training tour in Accra training kids about table tennis and donating some table tennis equipments to them to help further their interest in the sport.

He was also engaged in motivating young girls to get into table tennis with support from the ITTF Table Tennis United Fund.

Derek who is currently based in the UK in June 2023 donated table tennis kits and sporting equipments to some selected schools and foundations in Accra, Ghana.
