= Sanil Shetty =

Indian table tennis player

Personal information
- Full name: Sanil Shankar Shetty
- Nationality: Indian
- Born: 16 August 1989 (age 37) Mumbai, Maharashtra, India

Sport
- Sport: Table tennis
- Current ranking: 300 (28 September 2026)
Medal record
Men's Table tennis
Representing India
Commonwealth Games
| Gold medal – first place | 2018 Gold Coast | Men's team |
| Gold medal – first place | 2022 Birmingham | Men's team |
| Bronze medal – third place | 2018 Gold Coast | Men's doubles |
South Asian Games
| Gold medal – first place | 2016 Guwahati/Shillong | Men's team |
| Gold medal – first place | 2019 Kathmandu/Pokhara | Men's team |
| Silver medal – second place | 2016 Guwahati/Shillong | Men's doubles |
| Silver medal – second place | 2019 Kathmandu/Pokhara | Men's doubles |

Sanil Shankar Shetty is an Indian table-tennis player. In 2018 Commonwealth Games held at Gold Coast, Australia, He won gold in men's team event with Sharath Kamal, Anthony Amalraj, Sathiyan Gnanasekaran and Harmeet Desai & bronze in Men's doubles event with Harmeet Desai.
