= Badminton at the 2018 Commonwealth Games – Men's doubles =

Badminton – Men's doubles at the 2018 Commonwealth Games
- Venue: Carrara Sports and Leisure Centre, Gold Coast
- Dates: 10–15 April

Medalists
gold medal	Marcus Ellis; Chris Langridge	England
silver medal	Satwiksairaj Rankireddy; Chirag Shetty	India
bronze medal	Goh V Shem; Tan Wee Kiong	Malaysia

The men's doubles badminton event at the 2018 Commonwealth Games was held from 10 to 15 April 2018 at the Carrara Sports and Leisure Centre on the Gold Coast, Australia. The defending gold medalists were Goh V Shem and Tan Wee Kiong of Malaysia.

The athletes were drawn into straight knockout stage. The draw for the competition was conducted on 2 April 2018.

== Seeds ==
The seeds for the tournament were:

1. Goh V Shem / Tan Wee Kiong (MAS) (bronze medalists)
2. Satwiksairaj Rankireddy / Chirag Shetty (IND) (silver medalists)

3. Marcus Ellis / Chris Langridge (ENG) (gold medalists)
4. Jason Ho-Shue / Nyl Yakura (CAN) (quarter-finals)

Click on the seed number of a player to go to their draw section.

== Results ==
=== Finals ===
Semi-finals
1	Goh V Shem (MAS); Tan Wee Kiong (MAS)	21	16	15
3	Marcus Ellis (ENG); Chris Langridge (ENG)	15	21	21
Sachin Dias (SRI); Buwaneka Goonethilleka (SRI)	18	10
2	Satwiksairaj Rankireddy (IND); Chirag Shetty (IND)	21	21

Gold medal match
3	Marcus Ellis (ENG); Chris Langridge (ENG)	21	21
2	Satwiksairaj Rankireddy (IND); Chirag Shetty (IND)	13	16
Bronze medal match
1	Goh V Shem (MAS); Tan Wee Kiong (MAS)	21	21
Sachin Dias (SRI); Buwaneka Goonethilleka (SRI)	8	13

=== Top half ===
==== Section 1 ====
Round of 32
Cameron Coetzer (RSA); Prakash Vijayanath (RSA)	21	26	21
Daniel Sam (GHA); Emmanuel Donkor (GHA)	23	24	23
Alexander Dunn (SCO); Adam Hall (SCO)	21	21
Kervin Ghislain (SEY); Steve Malcouzane (SEY)	7	13

Round of 16
1	Goh V Shem (MAS); Tan Wee Kiong (MAS)	21	21
Daniel Sam (GHA); Emmanuel Donkor (GHA)	5	5
Dakeil Thorpe (BAR); Cory Fanus (BAR)	7	9
Alexander Dunn (SCO); Adam Hall (SCO)	21	21

Quarter-finals
1	Goh V Shem (MAS); Tan Wee Kiong (MAS)	21	21
Alexander Dunn (SCO); Adam Hall (SCO)	9	17

==== Section 2 ====
Round of 32
Dennis Coke (JAM); Anthony McNee (JAM)	19	10
Ty Lindeman (CAN); Brian Yang (CAN)	21	21
Liam Fong (FIJ); Burty Molia (FIJ)	8	11
Danny Bawa Chrisnanta (SGP); Terry Hee (SGP)	21	21
Murad Ali (PAK); Irfan Saeed Bhatti (PAK)	12	17
Matthew Chau (AUS); Sawan Serasinghe (AUS)	21	21

Round of 16
3	Marcus Ellis (ENG); Chris Langridge (ENG)	21	21
Ty Lindeman (CAN); Brian Yang (CAN)	11	9
Danny Bawa Chrisnanta (SGP); Terry Hee (SGP)	23	16	21
Matthew Chau (AUS); Sawan Serasinghe (AUS)	21	21	14

Quarter-finals
3	Marcus Ellis (ENG); Chris Langridge (ENG)	21	21
Danny Bawa Chrisnanta (SGP); Terry Hee (SGP)	18	17

=== Bottom half ===
==== Section 3 ====
Round of 32
Sachin Dias (SRI); Buwaneka Goonethilleka (SRI)	21	21
Kalombo Mulenga (ZAM); Chongo Mulenga (ZAM)	6	9
Edwin Ekiring (UGA); Brian Kasirye (UGA)	21	19
Matthew Bignell (JER); Alexander Hutchings (JER)	23	21
Abraham Ayittey (GHA); Michael Opoku Baah (GHA)	9	12
Martin Campbell (SCO); Patrick MacHugh (SCO)	21	21

Round of 16
Sachin Dias (SRI); Buwaneka Goonethilleka (SRI)	21	21
Matthew Bignell (JER); Alexander Hutchings (JER)	13	13
Martin Campbell (SCO); Patrick MacHugh (SCO)	11	17
4	Jason Ho-Shue (CAN); Nyl Yakura (CAN)	21	21

Quarter-finals
Sachin Dias (SRI); Buwaneka Goonethilleka (SRI)	19	22	21
4	Jason Ho-Shue (CAN); Nyl Yakura (CAN)	21	20	17

==== Section 4 ====
Round of 32
Robin Middleton (AUS); Ross Smith (AUS)	10	18
Chris Adcock (ENG); Ben Lane (ENG)	21	21
Chan Peng Soon (MAS); Goh Soon Huat (MAS)	21	21
Nicholas Bonkowsky (TTO); Naim Mohammed (TTO)	4	6
Aatish Lubah (MRI); Christopher Jean Paul (MRI)	w	/	o
Douglas Clark (FAI); Tobi Adeoye (FAI)

Round of 16
Chris Adcock (ENG); Ben Lane (ENG)	21	13	17
Chan Peng Soon (MAS); Goh Soon Huat (MAS)	12	21	21
Aatish Lubah (MRI); Christopher Jean Paul (MRI)	8	12
2	Satwiksairaj Rankireddy (IND); Chirag Shetty (IND)	21	21

Quarter-finals
Chan Peng Soon (MAS); Goh Soon Huat (MAS)	14	21	9
2	Satwiksairaj Rankireddy (IND); Chirag Shetty (IND)	21	15	21
