= Badminton at the 2018 Commonwealth Games – Men's singles =

Badminton – Men's singles at the 2018 Commonwealth Games
- Venue: Carrara Sports and Leisure Centre, Gold Coast
- Dates: 10–15 April

Medalists
gold medal	Lee Chong Wei	Malaysia
silver medal	Srikanth Kidambi	India
bronze medal	Rajiv Ouseph	England

The men's singles badminton event at the 2018 Commonwealth Games was held from 10 to 15 April 2018 at the Carrara Sports and Leisure Centre on the Gold Coast, Australia. The defending gold medalist was Parupalli Kashyap of India. Kashyap did not defend his title.

The athletes were drawn into straight knockout stage. The draw for the competition was conducted on 2 April 2018.

== Seeds ==
The seeds for the tournament were:

1. Srikanth Kidambi (IND) (silver medalist)
2. Lee Chong Wei (MAS) (gold medalist)
3. H. S. Prannoy (IND) (Fourth place)
4. Rajiv Ouseph (ENG) (bronze medalist)

5. Jason Ho-Shue (CAN) (quarter-finals)
6. Julien Paul (MRI) (round of 16)
7. Kieran Merrilees (SCO) (round of 32)
8. Ryan Ng (SGP) (quarter-finals)

Click on the seed number of a player to go to their draw section.

== Results ==
=== Finals ===
Semi-finals
1	Srikanth Kidambi (IND)	21	21
4	Rajiv Ouseph (ENG)	10	17
3	H. S. Prannoy (IND)	16	21	14
2	Lee Chong Wei (MAS)	21	9	21

Gold medal match
1	Srikanth Kidambi (IND)	21	14	14
2	Lee Chong Wei (MAS)	19	21	21
Bronze medal match
4	Rajiv Ouseph (ENG)	17	25	21
3	H. S. Prannoy (IND)	21	23	9

=== Top half ===
==== Section 1 ====
Round of 64
Abraham Ayittey (GHA)	18	16
Aatish Lubah (MRI)	21	21
Niluka Karunaratne (SRI)	21	21
Christopher Eynon (FAI)	8	7
Naim Mohammed (TTO)	21	21
Antoine Owona Ndimako (CMR)	17	9
Murad Ali (PAK)	16	19
Buwaneka Goonethilleka (SRI)	21	21

Round of 32
1	Srikanth Kidambi (IND)	21	21
Aatish Lubah (MRI)	13	10
Liam Fong (FIJ)	5	6
Niluka Karunaratne (SRI)	21	21
8	Ryan Ng (SGP)	21	21
Naim Mohammed (TTO)	4	11
Emmanuel Donkor (GHA)	18	22
Buwaneka Goonethilleka (SRI)	21	24

Round of 16
1	Srikanth Kidambi (IND)	21	21
Niluka Karunaratne (SRI)	10	10
8	Ryan Ng (SGP)	21	10	21
Buwaneka Goonethilleka (SRI)	9	21	19

Quarter-finals
1	Srikanth Kidambi (IND)	21	21
8	Ryan Ng (SGP)	15	12

==== Section 2 ====
Round of 64
Edwin Ekiring (UGA)	21	21
Cameron Coetzer (RSA)	10	14
Kalombo Mulenga (ZAM)	21	21
Alexander Hutchings (JER)	19	8
Narayan Ramdhani (GUY)	21	21
Vernon Smeed (SHN)	6	8
Tobi Adeoye (FAI)	13	14
Victor Munga (KEN)	21	21

Round of 32
4	Rajiv Ouseph (ENG)	21	21
Edwin Ekiring (UGA)	8	12
Dakeil Thorpe (BAR)	18	10
Kalombo Mulenga (ZAM)	21	21
5	Jason Ho-Shue (CAN)	21	21
Narayan Ramdhani (GUY)	7	10
Dennis Coke (JAM)	21	21
Victor Munga (KEN)	14	17

Round of 16
4	Rajiv Ouseph (ENG)	21	21
Kalombo Mulenga (ZAM)	8	10
5	Jason Ho-Shue (CAN)	21	21
Dennis Coke (JAM)	10	10

Quarter-finals
4	Rajiv Ouseph (ENG)	21	21
5	Jason Ho-Shue (CAN)	14	12

=== Bottom half ===
==== Section 3 ====
Round of 64
Kervin Ghislain (SEY)	7	10
Dinuka Karunaratne (SRI)	21	21
Prakash Vijayanath (RSA)	21	21
Burty Molia (FIJ)	12	11
Daniel Sam (GHA)	12	13
Anthony Joe (AUS)	21	21
Christopher Jean Paul (MRI)	25	21
Steve Malcouzane (SEY)	23	8

Round of 32
Dinuka Karunaratne (SRI)	21	21
Ciaran Chambers (NIR)	7	8
Prakash Vijayanath (RSA)	13	15
6	Julien Paul (MRI)	21	21
Anthony Joe (AUS)	22	21
Irfan Saeed Bhatti (PAK)	20	18
Christopher Jean Paul (MRI)	14	6
3	Prannoy H. S. (IND)	21	21

Round of 16
Dinuka Karunaratne (SRI)	23	22
6	Julien Paul (MRI)	21	20
Anthony Joe (AUS)	18	11
3	Prannoy H. S. (IND)	21	21

Quarter-finals
Dinuka Karunaratne (SRI)	13	6
3	Prannoy H. S. (IND)	21	21

==== Section 4 ====
Round of 64
Brian Yang (CAN)	21	21
Cory Fanus (BAR)	9	6
Loh Kean Yew (SGP)	21	21
Bongani von Bodenstein (RSA)	11	9
Douglas Clark (FAI)	14	7
Brian Kasirye (UGA)	21	21
Chongo Mulenga (ZAM)	10	19
Benjamin Li (IOM)	21	21

Round of 32
Brian Yang (CAN)	21	21
Samuel Ricketts (JAM)	9	13
Loh Kean Yew (SGP)	21	18	21
7	Kieran Merrilees (SCO)	12	21	18
Brian Kasirye (UGA)	15	21	21
Nicholas Bonkowsky (TTO)	21	10	11
Benjamin Li (IOM)	6	3
2	Lee Chong Wei (MAS)	21	21

Round of 16
Brian Yang (CAN)	16	17
Loh Kean Yew (SGP)	21	21
Brian Kasirye (UGA)	6	6
2	Lee Chong Wei (MAS)	21	21

Quarter-finals
Loh Kean Yew (SGP)	13	16
2	Lee Chong Wei (MAS)	21	21
