= Barbados at the 2018 Commonwealth Games =

- Flag of Barbados
- CG code: BAR
- CGA: Barbados Olympic Association
- Website: olympic.org.bb

in Gold Coast, Australia 4 April 2018 – 15 April 2018
- Competitors: 45 in 11 sports
- Flag bearer: Meagan Best
- Medals Ranked 0th: Gold 0 Silver 0 Bronze 0 Total 0

Commonwealth Games appearances (overview)
- 1954; 1958; 1962; 1966; 1970; 1974; 1978; 1982; 1986; 1990; 1994; 1998; 2002; 2006; 2010; 2014; 2018; 2022; 2026; 2030

Barbados competed at the 2018 Commonwealth Games in the Gold Coast, Australia from April 4 to April 15, 2018. It was Barbados's 16th appearance at the Commonwealth Games.

Squash athlete Meagan Best was the country's flag bearer during the opening ceremony.

== Competitors ==
The following is the list of number of competitors participating at the Games per sport/discipline.

Sport	Men	Women	Total
Athletics	5	3	8
Badminton	2	0	2
Boxing	1	1	2
Cycling	0	1	1
Netball	—N/a	12	12
Shooting	7	1	8
Squash	1	2	3
Swimming	1	0	1
Table tennis	4	0	4
Triathlon	2	0	2
Weightlifting	2	0	2
Total	25	20	45

== Athletics ==
Barbados participated with 8 athletes (5 men and 3 women).

Men
Track & road events

Athlete	Event	Heat		Semifinal		Final	
Athlete	Event	Result	Rank	Result	Rank	Result	Rank
Ramon Gittens	100 m	10.50	2 Q	10.44	7	did not advance	
Stephen Headley	100 m	10.70	4	did not advance			
Shane Brathwaite	200 m	DSQ		did not advance			
Nicholas Deshong	200 m	21.26	4	did not advance			
Burkheart Ellis Jr	200 m	21.02	2 Q	20.79	6	did not advance	
Shane Brathwaite	110 m hurdles	13.64	5 q	—N/a		13.53	6
Shane Brathwaite; Nicholas Deshong; Burkheart Ellis Jr; Ramon Gittens	4 × 100 m relay	38.95	4 q	—N/a		39.04	5

Women
Track & road events

Athlete	Event	Heat		Semifinal		Final	
Athlete	Event	Result	Rank	Result	Rank	Result	Rank
Sada Williams	200 m	DNS		did not advance			
Kierre Beckles	100 m hurdles	13.66	6	—N/a		did not advance	
Tia-Adana Belle	400 m hurdles	56.55	7	—N/a		did not advance	

== Badminton ==
Barbados participated with two athletes (two men)

Athlete	Event	Round of 64	Round of 32	Round of 16	Quarterfinal	Semifinal	Final / BM	
Athlete	Event	Opposition Score	Opposition Score	Opposition Score	Opposition Score	Opposition Score	Opposition Score	Rank
Cory Fanus	Men's singles	Yang (CAN); L 0 - 2	did not advance					
Dakeil Thorpe	Men's singles	BYE	Mulenga (ZAM); L 0 - 2	did not advance				
Cory Fanus; Dakeil Thorpe	Men's doubles	—N/a	BYE	Dunn / Hall (SCO); L 0 - 2	did not advance			

== Boxing ==
Barbados participated with a team of 2 athletes (1 man and 1 woman)

Athlete	Event	Round of 16	Quarterfinals	Semifinals	Final	Rank
Athlete	Event	Opposition Result	Opposition Result	Opposition Result	Opposition Result	Rank
Jabali Breedy	Men's −52 kg	Brendan Irvine (NIR); L 0-5	did not advance			
Kimberly Gittens	Women's −60 kg	Sarita Devi (IND); L 0-5	did not advance			

== Cycling ==
Barbados participated with 1 athlete (1 woman).

=== Track ===
Points race

Athlete	Event	Final	
Athlete	Event	Points	Rank
Amber Joseph	Women's points race	0	15

Scratch race

Athlete	Event	Final
Amber Joseph	Women's scratch race	16

== Netball ==
Barbados qualified a netball team by virtue of being ranked in the top 11 (excluding the host nation, Australia) of the INF World Rankings on July 1, 2017.

Roster

- Shonette Azore
- Latonia Blackman
- Vanessa Bobb
- Damisha Croney
- Rieah Holder
- Teresa Howell
- Rhe-Ann Niles
- Nikita Piggott
- Tonisha Rock-Yaw
- Shonte Seale
- Sabreena Smith
- Shonica Wharton

Pool A

Pos	Team	Pld	W	D	L	GF	GA	GD	Pts	Qualification
1	Australia (H)	5	5	0	0	413	162	+251	10	Semi-finals
2	Jamaica	5	4	0	1	351	221	+130	8	Semi-finals
3	South Africa	5	3	0	2	310	205	+105	6	Classification matches
4	Northern Ireland	5	2	0	3	224	307	−83	4	Classification matches
5	Barbados	5	1	0	4	185	333	−148	2	Classification matches
6	Fiji	5	0	0	5	171	426	−255	0	Classification matches

Updated to match(es) played on 11 April 2018. Source: GC2018
(H) Hosts

6 April 2018
20:30

Report
Barbados
24–79
Australia

Gold Coast Convention and Exhibition Centre
Umpires: Lisa McPhail
Kristie Simpson
Reserve umpire: Kate Stephenson
Wharton 12/17 (71%)
Blackman 8/10 (80%)
Payne 4/5 (80%)

Thwaites 24/24 (100%)
Bassett 23/26 (88%)
Wood 17/17 (100%)
Pettitt 15/15 (100%)

7 April 2018
20:30

Report
Fiji
44–65
Barbados

Gold Coast Convention and Exhibition Centre
Umpires: Maria van der Merwe
Theresa Prince
Reserve umpire: Michelle Phippard
M. Rusivakula 27/31 (87%)
U. Rusivakula 10/12 (83%)
Waqa 7/8 (88%)

Wharton 33/38 (87%)
Blackman 22/28 (79%)
Payne 10/12 (83%)

9 April 2018
18:30

Report
Jamaica
76–32
Barbados

Gold Coast Convention and Exhibition Centre
Umpires: Maria van der Merwe
Marc Henning
Reserve umpire: Gary Burgess
Fowler-Reid 32/36 (89%)
Aiken 28/33 (85%)
Beckford 12/14 (86%)
Robinson 4/8 (50%)

Blackman 17/19 (89%)
Wharton 9/12 (75%)
Payne 6/9 (67%)

10 April 2018
13:00

Report
Barbados
39–49
Northern Ireland

Gold Coast Convention and Exhibition Centre
Umpires: Theresa Prince
Gary Burgess
Reserve umpire: Maria van der Merwe
Wharton 27/29 (93%)
Blackman 9/12 (75%)
Payne 3/3 (100%)

L. Bowman 20/25 (80%)
Lennon 15/16 (94%)
Oonagh McCullough 9/15 (60%)
K. Bowman 5/7 (71%)

11 April 2018
11:00

Report
South Africa
85–25
Barbados

Gold Coast Convention and Exhibition Centre
Umpires: Jackie Mizon
Kate Stephenson
Reserve umpire: Jono Bredin
Venter 34/35 (97%)
Burger 33/35 (94%)
Holtzhausen 10/14 (71%)
Stoltz 8/9 (89%)

Blackman 14/15 (93%)
Payne 11/17 (65%)

Ninth place match

12 April 2018
11:00

Report
Barbados
48–50
Scotland

Gold Coast Convention and Exhibition Centre
Umpires: Helen George
Maria van der Merwe
Reserve umpire: Gary Burgess
Payne 22/24 (92%)
Blackman 15/17 (88%)
Wharton 11/12 (92%)

Gallagher 35/37 (95%)
Goodwin 13/21 (62%)
Pettitt 2/5 (40%)

== Shooting ==
Barbados participated with 8 athletes (7 men and 1 woman).

Men

Athlete	Event	Qualification		Final	
Athlete	Event	Points	Rank	Points	Rank
Louis Estwick	50 metre rifle prone	577.8	29	did not advance	
Bernard Chase	50 metre pistol	470	20	did not advance	
Ronald Sargeant	50 metre pistol	481	19	did not advance	
Bernard Chase	10 metre air pistol	537	18	did not advance	
Ronald Sargeant	10 metre air pistol	519	21	did not advance	
Michael Maskell	Trap	102	29	did not advance	
Justin St. John	Trap	103	27	did not advance	
Michael Maskell	Skeet	118	8	did not advance	

Women

Athlete	Event	Qualification		Final	
Athlete	Event	Points	Rank	Points	Rank
Michelle Elliot	Skeet	62	11	did not advance	

Open

Athlete	Event	Day 1		Day 2		Day 3		Total	
Athlete	Event	Points	Rank	Points	Rank	Points	Rank	Overall	Rank
Richard Arthur	Queen's prize individual	96-1v	28	139-4v	29	139-13v	27	374-18v	28
Jason Wood	Queen's prize individual	102-4v	23	142-12v	27	147-14v	10	391-30v	22
Richard Arthur; Jason Wood	Queen's prize pairs	274-20v	14	250-5v	14	—N/a		524-25v	14

== Squash ==
Barbados participated with 3 athletes (1 man and 2 women).

Individual

Athlete	Event	Round of 64	Round of 32	Round of 16	Quarterfinals	Semifinals	Final	
Athlete	Event	Opposition Score	Opposition Score	Opposition Score	Opposition Score	Opposition Score	Opposition Score	Rank
Shawn Simpson	Men's singles	Seth (GUY); L 1 - 3	did not advance					
Meagan Best	Women's singles	Bye	Waters (ENG); L 0 - 3	did not advance				
Amanda Haywood	Women's singles	Laing (CAY); W 3 - 2	Massaro (ENG); L 0 - 3	did not advance				

Doubles

Athlete	Event	Group stage			Round of 16	Quarterfinals	Semifinals	Final	
Athlete	Event	Opposition Score	Opposition Score	Rank	Opposition Score	Opposition Score	Opposition Score	Opposition Score	Rank
Meagan Best; Shawn Simpson	Mixed doubles	Mua / Henry (FIJ); W 2 - 0	Waters / Selby (ENG); L 0 - 2	2 Q	King / Coll (NZL); L 0 - 2	did not advance			

== Swimming ==
Barbados participated with 1 athlete (1 man).

Men

Athlete	Event	Heat		Semifinal		Final	
Athlete	Event	Time	Rank	Time	Rank	Time	Rank
Alex Sobers	50 m freestyle	23.75	28	did not advance			
Alex Sobers	100 m freestyle	51.12	29	did not advance			
Alex Sobers	200 m freestyle	1:51.87	20	—N/a		did not advance	

== Table tennis ==
Barbados participated with 4 athletes (4 men).

Singles

Athletes	Event	Group Stage			Round of 64	Round of 32	Round of 16	Quarterfinal	Semifinal	Final	Rank
Athletes	Event	Opposition Score	Opposition Score	Rank	Opposition Score	Opposition Score	Opposition Score	Opposition Score	Opposition Score	Opposition Score	Rank
Kristian Doughty	Men's singles	Rameez (PAK); L 0 - 4	Mutua (KEN); W 4 - 2	2	did not advance						
Mark Dowell	Men's singles	Taucoory (MRI); L 2 - 4	Howieson (SCO); L 0 - 4	3	did not advance						
Tyrese Knight	Men's singles	Sam (GHA); L 3 - 4	Bryan (GUY); W 4 - 1	2	did not advance						

Doubles

Athletes	Event	Round of 64	Round of 32	Round of 16	Quarterfinal	Semifinal	Final	Rank
Athletes	Event	Opposition Score	Opposition Score	Opposition Score	Opposition Score	Opposition Score	Opposition Score	Rank
Kristian Doughty; Marcus Smith	Men's doubles	Bye	Choong / Leong (MAS); L 0 - 3	did not advance				
Mark Dowell; Tyrese Knight	Men's doubles	Bye	Hu / Yan (AUS); L 0 - 3	did not advance				

Team

Athletes	Event	Group Stage			Round of 16	Quarterfinal	Semifinal	Final	Rank
Athletes	Event	Opposition Score	Opposition Score	Rank	Opposition Score	Opposition Score	Opposition Score	Opposition Score	Rank
Kristian Doughty; Mark Dowell; Tyrese Knight; Marcus Smith	Men's team	Singapore; L 0 - 3	Mauritius; L 2 - 3	3	did not advance				

== Triathlon ==
Barbados participated with 2 athletes (2 men).

Individual

Athlete	Event	Swim (750 m)	Trans 1	Bike (20 km)	Trans 2	Run (5 km)	Total	Rank
Jason Wilson	Men's	9:13	0:34	31:12	0:27	16:48	58:14	23
Matthew Wright	Men's	10:12	0:37	30:48	0:28	16:41	58:46	25

== Weightlifting ==
Barbados participated with two athletes (two men).

Athlete	Event	Snatch		Clean & Jerk		Total	Rank
Athlete	Event	Result	Rank	Result	Rank	Total	Rank
Romario Forde	Men's −77 kg	117	13	160	7	277	11
Ivorn McKnee	Men's −105 kg	145	6	did not finish			

== See also ==
- Barbados at the 2018 Summer Youth Olympics
