= Shooting at the 2018 Commonwealth Games – Queen's Prize individual =

Shooting – Queen's Prize individual at the 2018 Commonwealth Games
- Venue: Belmont Shooting Centre, Brisbane
- Dates: 11, 12 & 14 April 2018
- Competitors: 33 from 17 nations

Medalists
gold medal	David Luckman	England
silver medal	Jim Bailey	Australia
bronze medal	Parag Patel	England

The Queen's Prize individual event took place on 11, 12, and 14 April 2018 at the Belmont Shooting Centre in Brisbane. The winners were determined by the cumulative points earned over all three days of competition.

== Records ==
Prior to this competition, the existing Games record was as follows:

Games record	David Luckman (ENG)	401-42v	Glasgow, Scotland	27–29 July 2014

== Schedule ==
The schedule was as follows:

Date	Time	Round
Wednesday 11 April 2018	10:00	Day 1
Thursday 12 April 2018	10:00	Day 2
Saturday 14 April 2018	10:00	Day 3

All times are Australian Eastern Standard Time (UTC+10)

== Results ==
The results are as follows:

Rank	Athlete	Day 1				Subtotal Day 1	Day 2				Subtotal Day 2	Subtotal Day 1 & Day 2	Day 3		Subtotal Day 3	Total
Rank	Athlete	300	500	300 & 500	600	Subtotal Day 1	300	500	300 & 500	600	Subtotal Day 2	Subtotal Day 1 & Day 2	900	1000	Subtotal Day 3	Total
1st place, gold medalist(s)	David Luckman (ENG)	35-6v	35-3v	70-9v	35-4v	105-13v	50-8v	50-7v	100-15v	50-4v	150-19v	255-32v	75-11v	74-6v	149-17v	404-49v GR
2nd place, silver medalist(s)	Jim Bailey (AUS)	35-4v	35-6v	70-10v	35-5v	105-15v	50-8v	50-7v	100-15v	50-7v	150-22v	255-37v	75-7v	73-6v	148-13v	403-50v
3rd place, bronze medalist(s)	Parag Patel (ENG)	35-3v	35-3v	70-6v	35-4v	105-10v	50-9v	50-9v	100-18v	49-4v	149-22v	254-32v	74-6v	75-7v	149-13v	403-45v
4	Ian Shaw (SCO)	35-6v	35-3v	70-9v	34-2v	104-11v	50-7v	50-7v	100-14v	50-4v	150-18v	254-29v	74-5v	74-5v	148-10v	402-39v
5	Barry le Cheminant (JER)	35-5v	35-4v	70-9v	35-3v	105-12v	50-8v	50-8v	100-16v	49-4v	149-20v	254-32v	74-9v	73-9v	147-18v	401-50v
6	David Le Quesne (JER)	35-5v	34-5v	69-10v	34-0v	103-10v	50-7v	50-7v	100-14v	49-7v	149-21v	252-31v	75-7v	73-9v	148-16v	400-47v
7	Nicole Rossignol (CAN)	35-3v	35-4v	70-7v	35-2v	105-9v	48-4v	50-9v	98-13v	50-5v	148-18v	253-27v	74-7v	73-4v	147-11v	400-38v
8	John Snowden (NZL)	35-3v	35-6v	70-9v	35-5v	105-14v	49-2v	50-4v	99-6v	48-5v	147-11v	252-25v	73-6v	75-4v	148-10v	400-35v
9	Ben Emms (AUS)	35-5v	35-5v	70-10v	35-3v	105-13v	49-6v	50-7v	99-13v	48-3v	147-16v	252-29v	75-12v	72-7v	147-19v	399-48v
10	Gareth Morris (WAL)	35-6v	34-3v	69-9v	34-4v	103-13v	50-7v	50-5v	100-12v	48-5v	148-17v	251-30v	74-6v	74-9v	148-15v	399-45v
11	Petrus Haasbroek (RSA)	34-4v	35-3v	69-7v	35-5v	104-12v	50-4v	50-8v	100-12v	49-8v	149-20v	253-32v	73-7v	73-6v	146-13v	399-45v
12	David Calvert (NIR)	35-5v	35-3v	70-8v	35-1v	105-9v	49-7v	50-7v	99-14v	49-4v	148-18v	253-27v	73-7v	73-6v	146-13v	399-40v
13	Alexander Walker (SCO)	34-3v	35-2v	69-5v	34-5v	103-10v	50-6v	50-7v	100-13v	49-2v	149-15v	252-25v	74-9v	73-4v	147-13v	399-38v
14	Peter Jory (GUE)	35-5v	35-2v	70-7v	33-2v	103-9v	50-4v	49-8v	99-12v	50-6v	149-18v	252-27v	75-6v	72-4v	147-10v	399-37v
15	Brian Carter (NZL)	35-4v	35-5v	70-9v	35-5v	105-14v	50-5v	48-7v	98-12v	50-7v	148-19v	253-33v	73-5v	72-4v	145-9v	398-42v
16	Chris Watson (WAL)	34-3v	34-1v	68-4v	35-4v	103-8v	48-3v	50-7v	98-10v	49-4v	147-14v	250-22v	72-8v	75-5v	147-13v	397-35v
17	Jack Alexander (NIR)	35-4v	34-2v	69-6v	35-5v	104-11v	48-3v	50-4v	98-7v	48-6v	146-13v	250-24v	73-9v	73-7v	146-16v	396-40v
18	Lennox Braithwaite (GUY)	35-2v	35-5v	70-7v	35-3v	105-10v	49-6v	50-6v	99-12v	49-5v	148-17v	253-27v	72-5v	71-3v	143-8v	396-35v
19	Adam Jory (GUE)	35-4v	35-0v	70-4v	34-2v	104-6v	49-3v	50-4v	99-7v	49-5v	148-12v	252-18v	73-6v	70-2v	143-8v	395-26v
20	Jacobus du Toit (RSA)	35-2v	35-4v	70-6v	33-0v	103-6v	49-5v	50-7v	99-12v	47-3v	146-15v	249-21v	72-5v	72-7v	144-12v	393-33v
21	Robert Pitcairn (CAN)	34-5v	34-3v	68-8v	35-3v	103-11v	48-3v	50-7v	98-10v	44-0v	142-10v	245-21v	73-3v	73-7v	146-10v	391-31v
22	Jason Wood (BAR)	34-2v	33-0v	67-2v	35-2v	102-4v	47-4v	49-4v	96-8v	46-4v	142-12v	244-16v	74-10v	73-4v	147-14v	391-30v
23	Mark Dodd (FAI)	32-2v	35-4v	67-6v	35-3v	102-9v	47-1v	50-5v	97-6v	47-1v	144-7v	246-16v	73-7v	72-3v	145-10v	391-26v
24	Ransford Goodluck (GUY)	33-4v	34-0v	67-4v	34-2v	101-6v	49-6v	47-5v	96-11v	49-5v	145-16v	246-22v	74-4v	70-5v	144-9v	390-31v
25	Christopher K Saina (KEN)	35-6v	31-3v	66-9v	35-2v	101-11v	47-4v	49-2v	96-6v	47-3v	143-9v	244-20v	71-4v	71-6v	142-10v	386-30v
26	Christian Berntsen (FAI)	31-2v	32-1v	63-3v	32-3v	95-6v	48-6v	48-2v	96-8v	48-2v	144-10v	239-16v	70-4v	69-4v	139-8v	378-24v
27	David C Rickman (JAM)	31-0v	32-1v	63-1v	32-1v	95-2v	47-2v	47-2v	94-4v	50-4v	144-8v	239-10v	69-5v	67-4v	136-9v	375-19v
28	Richard Arthur (BAR)	32-0v	33-1v	65-1v	31-0v	96-1v	45-1v	49-2v	94-3v	45-1v	139-4v	235-5v	71-5v	68-8v	139-13v	374-18v
29	Denis Nelson (JAM)	33-2v	33-3v	66-5v	33-1v	99-6v	47-2v	49-5v	96-7v	47-3v	143-10v	242-16v	58-4v	71-3v	129-7v	371-23v
30	Delborn Joseph (TRI)	35-2v	30-2v	65-4v	33-3v	98-7v	45-2v	44-2v	89-4v	45-2v	134-6v	232-13v	66-2v	64-2v	130-4v	362-17v
31	Edworth Benjamin (ANT)	28-3v	28-1v	56-4v	29-0v	85-4v	40-1v	44-3v	84-4v	44-0v	128-4v	213-8v	70-4v	71-8v	141-12v	354-20v
32	Michael Perez (TRI)	32-2v	33-3v	65-5v	29-0v	94-5v	45-3v	47-4v	92-7v	46-1v	138-8v	232-13v	61-1v	61-1v	122-2v	354-15v
33	Desroy Maile (ANT)	32-2v	29-0v	61-2v	31-1v	92-3v	44-1v	45-3v	89-4v	41-1v	130-5v	222-8v	64-0v	62-1v	126-1v	348-9v
