= Squash at the 2018 Commonwealth Games – Mixed doubles =

Mixed doubles squash at the 2018 Commonwealth Games
- Venue: Oxenford Studios
- Dates: 10 – 14 April 2018
- Competitors: 48 from 16 nations

Medalists
gold medal	Donna Urquhart; Cameron Pilley	Australia
silver medal	Dipika Pallikal Karthik; Saurav Ghosal	India
bronze medal	Joelle King; Paul Coll	New Zealand

The Mixed doubles Squash event at the 2018 Commonwealth Games was held at the Oxenford Studios, Gold Coast, Australia from 10 to 14 April. Australia, which were the champions from the previous edition of the Games in 2014, beat India in straight sets to win the gold.

== Medalists ==
Gold	Australia; Donna Urquhart; Cameron Pilley
Silver	India; Dipika Pallikal Karthik; Saurav Ghosal
Bronze	New Zealand; Joelle King; Paul Coll

== Seeds ==
1. Joelle King / Paul Coll (NZL) (bronze medal)
2. Alison Waters / Daryl Selby (ENG) (Fourth place)
3. Tesni Evans / Peter Creed (WAL) (quarterfinals)
4. Donna Urquhart / Cameron Pilley (AUS) (gold medal)
5. Dipika Pallikal Karthik / Saurav Ghosal (IND) (silver medal)
6. Rachael Grinham / Ryan Cuskelly (AUS) (quarterfinals)
7. Jenny Duncalf / Adrian Waller (ENG) (quarterfinals)
8. Joshna Chinappa / Harinder Pal Sandhu (IND) (quarterfinals)
9. Lisa Aitken / Kevin Moran (SCO) (round of 16)
10. Amanda Landers-Murphy / Zac Millar (NZL) (round of 16)
11. Aifa Azman / Sanjay Singh (MAS) (round of 16)
12. Madina Zafar / Tayyab Aslam (PAK) (round of 16)
13. Faiza Zafar / Farhan Zaman (PAK) (round of 16)
14. Marlene West / Cameron Stafford (CAY) (round of 16)
15. Meagan Best / Shawn Simpson (BAR) (round of 16)
16. Dianne Kellas / Bradley Hindle (MLT) (round of 16)

== Finals ==
Round of 16
1	Joelle King (NZL); Paul Coll (NZL)	11	11
15	Meagan Best (BAR); Shawn Simpson (BAR)	2	7
8	Joshna Chinappa (IND); Harinder Pal Sandhu (IND)	11	10	11
10	Amanda Landers-Murphy (NZL); Zac Millar (NZL)	7	11	5
3	Tesni Evans (WAL); Peter Creed (WAL)	11	11
14	Faiza Zafar (PAK); Farhan Zaman (PAK)	1	5
5	Dipika Pallikal Karthik (IND); Saurav Ghosal (IND)	7	11	11
11	Aifa Azman (MAS); Sanjay Singh (MAS)	11	6	8
12	Madina Zafar (PAK); Tayyab Aslam (PAK)	3	1
6	Rachael Grinham (AUS); Ryan Cuskelly (AUS)	11	11
14	Marlene West (CAY); Cameron Stafford (CAY)	7	5
4	Donna Urquhart (AUS); Cameron Pilley (AUS)	11	11
9	Lisa Aitken (SCO); Kevin Moran (SCO)	7	6
7	Jenny Duncalf (ENG); Adrian Waller (ENG)	11	11
16	Dianne Kellas (MLT); Bradley Hindle (MLT)	3	6
2	Alison Waters (ENG); Daryl Selby (ENG)	11	11

Quarterfinals
1	Joelle King (NZL); Paul Coll (NZL)	11	11
8	Joshna Chinappa (IND); Harinder Pal Sandhu (IND)	10	10
3	Tesni Evans (WAL); Peter Creed (WAL)	8	10
5	Dipika Pallikal Karthik (IND); Saurav Ghosal (IND)	11	11
6	Rachael Grinham (AUS); Ryan Cuskelly (AUS)	6	9
4	Donna Urquhart (AUS); Cameron Pilley (AUS)	11	11
7	Jenny Duncalf (ENG); Adrian Waller (ENG)	7	11	10
2	Alison Waters (ENG); Daryl Selby (ENG)	11	9	11

Semifinals
1	Joelle King (NZL); Paul Coll (NZL)	11	8	10
5	Dipika Pallikal Karthik (IND); Saurav Ghosal (IND)	9	11	11
4	Donna Urquhart (AUS); Cameron Pilley (AUS)	10	11	11
2	Alison Waters (ENG); Daryl Selby (ENG)	11	7	7

Gold Medal Match
5	Dipika Pallikal Karthik (IND); Saurav Ghosal (IND)	8	10
4	Donna Urquhart (AUS); Cameron Pilley (AUS)	11	11
Bronze Medal Match
1	Joelle King (NZL); Paul Coll (NZL)	11	11
2	Alison Waters (ENG); Daryl Selby (ENG)	6	6

== Group stage ==
=== Pool A ===
Team	MP	MW	ML	GW	GL	GD	PW	PL	PD
Joelle King (NZL); Paul Coll (NZL)	2	2	0	4	0	+4	44	17	+27
Dianne Kellas (MLT); Bradley Hindle (MLT)	2	1	1	2	2	0	28	34	-6
Lynette Vai (PNG); Madako Junior Suari (PNG)	2	0	2	0	4	-4	23	44	-21

Date		Score		Set 1	Set 2	Set 3
10 Apr	Joelle King (NZL); Paul Coll (NZL)	2–0	Lynette Vai (PNG); Madako Junior Suari (PNG)	11–4	11–7	
10 Apr	Dianne Kellas (MLT); Bradley Hindle (MLT)	2–0	Lynette Vai (PNG); Madako Junior Suari (PNG)	11–6	11–6	
11 Apr	Joelle King (NZL); Paul Coll (NZL)	2–0	Dianne Kellas (MLT); Bradley Hindle (MLT)	11–2	11–4	

=== Pool B ===
Team	MP	MW	ML	GW	GL	GD	PW	PL	PD
Alison Waters (ENG); Daryl Selby (ENG)	2	2	0	4	0	+4	44	7	+37
Meagan Best (BAR); Shawn Simpson (BAR)	2	1	1	2	2	0	27	25	+2
Alison Mua (FIJ); Stephen Henry (FIJ)	2	0	2	0	4	-4	5	44	-39

Date		Score		Set 1	Set 2	Set 3
10 Apr	Alison Waters (ENG); Daryl Selby (ENG)	2–0	Alison Mua (FIJ); Stephen Henry (FIJ)	11–0	11–2	
11 Apr	Meagan Best (BAR); Shawn Simpson (BAR)	2–0	Alison Mua (FIJ); Stephen Henry (FIJ)	11–2	11–1	
11 Apr	Alison Waters (ENG); Daryl Selby (ENG)	2–0	Meagan Best (BAR); Shawn Simpson (BAR)	11–3	11–2	

=== Pool C ===
Team	MP	MW	ML	GW	GL	GD	PW	PL	PD
Tesni Evans (WAL); Peter Creed (WAL)	2	2	0	4	0	+4	44	14	+30
Marlene West (CAY); Cameron Stafford (CAY)	2	1	1	2	2	0	32	35	-3
Khaaliqa Nimji (KEN); Hardeep Reel (KEN)	2	0	2	0	4	-4	17	44	-27

Date		Score		Set 1	Set 2	Set 3
10 Apr	Tesni Evans (WAL); Peter Creed (WAL)	2–0	Khaaliqa Nimji (KEN); Hardeep Reel (KEN)	11–3	11–1	
11 Apr	Marlene West (CAY); Cameron Stafford (CAY)	2–0	Khaaliqa Nimji (KEN); Hardeep Reel (KEN)	11–5	11–8	
11 Apr	Tesni Evans (WAL); Peter Creed (WAL)	2–0	Marlene West (CAY); Cameron Stafford (CAY)	11–5	11–5	

=== Pool D ===
Team	MP	MW	ML	GW	GL	GD	PW	PL	PD
Donna Urquhart (AUS); Cameron Pilley (AUS)	2	2	0	4	0	+4	44	20	+24
Faiza Zafar (PAK); Farhan Zaman (PAK)	2	1	1	2	2	0	31	40	-9
Taylor Fernandes (GUY); Sunil Seth (GUY)	2	0	2	0	4	-4	29	44	-15

Date		Score		Set 1	Set 2	Set 3
10 Apr	Donna Urquhart (AUS); Cameron Pilley (AUS)	2–0	Taylor Fernandes (GUY); Sunil Seth (GUY)	11–4	11–7	
10 Apr	Faiza Zafar (PAK); Farhan Zaman (PAK)	2–0	Taylor Fernandes (GUY); Sunil Seth (GUY)	11–8	11–10	
11 Apr	Donna Urquhart (AUS); Cameron Pilley (AUS)	2–0	Faiza Zafar (PAK); Farhan Zaman (PAK)	11–3	11–6	

=== Pool E ===
Team	MP	MW	ML	GW	GL	GD	PW	PL	PD
Dipika Pallikal Karthik (IND); Saurav Ghosal (IND)	2	2	0	4	0	+4	44	11	+33
Madina Zafar (PAK); Tayyab Aslam (PAK)	2	1	1	2	2	0	27	37	-10
Mary Fung-A-Fat (GUY); Jason-Ray Khalil (GUY)	2	0	2	0	4	-4	21	44	-23

Date		Score		Set 1	Set 2	Set 3
10 Apr	Dipika Pallikal Karthik (IND); Saurav Ghosal (IND)	2–0	Mary Fung-A-Fat (GUY); Jason-Ray Khalil (GUY)	11–3	11–3	
10 Apr	Dipika Pallikal Karthik (IND); Saurav Ghosal (IND)	2–0	Madina Zafar (PAK); Tayyab Aslam (PAK)	11–2	11–3	
11 Apr	Madina Zafar (PAK); Tayyab Aslam (PAK)	2–0	Mary Fung-A-Fat (GUY); Jason-Ray Khalil (GUY)	11–6	11–9	

=== Pool F ===
Team	MP	MW	ML	GW	GL	GD	PW	PL	PD
Rachael Grinham (AUS); Ryan Cuskelly (AUS)	2	2	0	4	0	+4	44	12	+32
Aifa Azman (MAS); Sanjay Singh (MAS)	2	1	1	2	2	0	30	30	0
Charlotte Knaggs (TTO); Kale Wilson (TTO)	2	0	2	0	4	-4	12	44	-32

Date		Score		Set 1	Set 2	Set 3
10 Apr	Aifa Azman (MAS); Sanjay Singh (MAS)	2–0	Charlotte Knaggs (TTO); Kale Wilson (TTO)	11–4	11–4	
10 Apr	Rachael Grinham (AUS); Ryan Cuskelly (AUS)	2–0	Aifa Azman (MAS); Sanjay Singh (MAS)	11–4	11–4	
11 Apr	Rachael Grinham (AUS); Ryan Cuskelly (AUS)	2–0	Charlotte Knaggs (TTO); Kale Wilson (TTO)	11–0	11–4	

=== Pool G ===
Team	MP	MW	ML	GW	GL	GD	PW	PL	PD
Jenny Duncalf (ENG); Adrian Waller (ENG)	2	2	0	4	0	+4	54	33	+21
Amanda Landers-Murphy (NZL); Zac Millar (NZL)	2	1	1	3	2	+1	43	44	-1
Colette Sultana (MLT); Daniel Zammit-Lewis (MLT)	2	0	2	0	4	-4	24	44	-20

Date		Score		Set 1	Set 2	Set 3
10 Apr	Jenny Duncalf (ENG); Adrian Waller (ENG)	2–1	Amanda Landers-Murphy (NZL); Zac Millar (NZL)	11–5	10–11	11–5
10 Apr	Amanda Landers-Murphy (NZL); Zac Millar (NZL)	2–0	Colette Sultana (MLT); Daniel Zammit-Lewis (MLT)	11–6	11–6	
11 Apr	Jenny Duncalf (ENG); Adrian Waller (ENG)	2–0	Colette Sultana (MLT); Daniel Zammit-Lewis (MLT)	11–5	11–7	

=== Pool H ===
Team	MP	MW	ML	GW	GL	GD	PW	PL	PD
Lisa Aitken (SCO); Kevin Moran (SCO)	2	1	1	2	2	+4	40	27	+13
Joshna Chinappa (IND); Harinder Pal Sandhu (IND)	2	2	0	4	0	0	44	27	+17
Caroline Laing (CAY); Jacob Kelly (CAY)	2	0	2	0	4	-4	14	44	-30

Date		Score		Set 1	Set 2	Set 3
10 Apr	Lisa Aitken (SCO); Kevin Moran (SCO)	2–0	Caroline Laing (CAY); Jacob Kelly (CAY)	11–2	11–3	
10 Apr	Joshna Chinappa (IND); Harinder Pal Sandhu (IND)	2–0	Caroline Laing (CAY); Jacob Kelly (CAY)	11–3	11–6	
11 Apr	Joshna Chinappa (IND); Harinder Pal Sandhu (IND)	2–0	Lisa Aitken (SCO); Kevin Moran (SCO)	11–10	11–8	
