= Guyana at the 2018 Commonwealth Games =

- Flag of Guyana
- CG code: GUY
- CGA: Guyana Olympic Association

in Gold Coast, Australia 4 April 2018 – 15 April 2018
- Competitors: 23 in 7 sports
- Medals Ranked 26th: Gold 1 Silver 0 Bronze 0 Total 1

Commonwealth Games appearances (overview)
- 1930; 1934; 1938; 1950; 1954; 1958; 1962; 1966; 1970; 1974; 1978; 1982; 1986; 1990; 1994; 1998; 2002; 2006; 2010; 2014; 2018; 2022; 2026; 2030

Guyana competed at the 2018 Commonwealth Games in the Gold Coast, Australia from April 4 to April 15, 2018. It was Guyana's 18th appearance at the Commonwealth Games.

== Medalists ==
| Medal | Name | Sport | Event | Date |
|---|---|---|---|---|
| Gold | Troy Doris | Athletics | Men's Triple Jump | April 14 |

== Competitors ==
The following is the list of number of competitors participating at the Games per sport/discipline.

| Sport | Men | Women | Total |
|---|---|---|---|
| Athletics (track and field) | 4 | 2 | 6 |
| Badminton | 1 | 0 | 1 |
| Boxing | 2 | 0 | 2 |
| Shooting | 2 | 0 | 2 |
| Squash | 2 | 2 | 4 |
| Swimming | 1 | 1 | 2 |
| Table tennis | 3 | 3 | 6 |
| Total | 15 | 8 | 23 |

== Athletics (track and field) ==
Guyana's track and field team consisted of six athletes (four male and two female).

Men
Track & road events

| Athlete | Event | Heat | | Semifinal | | Final | |
| Athlete | Event | Result | Rank | Result | Rank | Result | Rank |
|---|---|---|---|---|---|---|---|
| Emanuel Archibald | 100 m | 10.40 | 3 q | 10.46 | 7 | Did not advance | |
| Winston George | 200 m | 21.19 | 4 | Did not advance | | | |
| Winston George | 400 m | 46.92 | 3 Q | 47.25 | 7 | Did not advance | |

Field events

| Athlete | Event | Qualification | | Final | |
| Athlete | Event | Distance | Rank | Distance | Rank |
|---|---|---|---|---|---|
| Emanuel Archibald | Long jump | 7.24 | 21 | Did not advance | |
| Troy Doris | Triple jump | 16.33 | 5 q | 16.88 | 1st place, gold medalist(s) |
| Leslain Baird | Javelin throw | 74.27 | 14 | Did not advance | |

Women
Field events

| Athlete | Event | Final | |
| Athlete | Event | Distance | Position |
|---|---|---|---|
| Natrena Hooper | High jump | 1.75 | 12 |
| Natrena Hooper | Triple jump | 12.62 | 11 |
| Natricia Hooper | Triple jump | 13.36 | 8 |

== Badminton ==
Guyana participated with one athlete (one man).

| Athlete | Event | Round of 64 | Round of 32 | Round of 16 | Quarterfinal | Semifinal | Final / BM | |
| Athlete | Event | Opposition Score | Opposition Score | Opposition Score | Opposition Score | Opposition Score | Opposition Score | Rank |
|---|---|---|---|---|---|---|---|---|
| Narayan Ramdhani | Men's singles | Vernon Smeed (SHN); W 2 - 0 | Jason Ho-Shue (CAN); L 0 - 2 | Did not advance | | | | |

== Boxing ==
Guyana participated with a team of 2 athletes (2 men)

Men

| Athlete | Event | Round of 32 | Round of 16 | Quarterfinals | Semifinals | Final | Rank |
| Athlete | Event | Opposition Result | Opposition Result | Opposition Result | Opposition Result | Opposition Result | Rank |
|---|---|---|---|---|---|---|---|
| Keevin Allicock | −52 kg | —N/a | Reece McFadden (SCO); L 1 - 4 | Did not advance | | | |
| Colin Lewis | −64 kg | Nathan Ferrari (LCA); W 4 - 1 | Sinethemba Blom (RSA); L 1 - 4 | Did not advance | | | |

== Shooting ==
Guyana participated with 2 athletes (2 men).

Open

| Athlete | Event | Day 1 | | Day 2 | | Day 3 | | Total | |
| Athlete | Event | Points | Rank | Points | Rank | Points | Rank | Overall | Rank |
|---|---|---|---|---|---|---|---|---|---|
| Lennox Braithwaite | Queen's prize individual | 105-10v | 7 | 148-17v | 13 | 143-8v | 23 | 396-35v | 18 |
| Ransford Goodluck | Queen's prize individual | 101-6v | 25 | 145-16v | 21 | 144-9v | 22 | 390-31v | 24 |
| Lennox Braithwaite; Ransford Goodluck | Queen's prize pairs | 293-29v | 11 | 270-19v | 11 | —N/a | | 563-48v | 11 |

== Squash ==
Guyana participated with 4 athletes (2 men and 2 women).

Individual

| Athlete | Event | Round of 64 | Round of 32 | Round of 16 | Quarterfinals | Semifinals | Final | |
| Athlete | Event | Opposition Score | Opposition Score | Opposition Score | Opposition Score | Opposition Score | Opposition Score | Rank |
|---|---|---|---|---|---|---|---|---|
| Jason-Ray Khalil | Men's singles | Campbell Grayson (NZL); L 0-3 | Did not advance | | | | | |
| Sunil Seth | Men's singles | Shawn Simpson (BAR); W 3-1 | Rex Hedrick (AUS); L 0-3 | Did not advance | | | | |
| Taylor Fernandes | Women's singles | BYE | Tesni Evans (WAL); L 0-3 | Did not advance | | | | |
| Mary Fung-A-Fat | Women's singles | BYE | Samantha Cornett (CAN); L 0-3 | Did not advance | | | | |

Doubles

| Athlete | Event | Group stage | | | | Round of 16 | Quarterfinals | Semifinals | Final | |
| Athlete | Event | Opposition Score | Opposition Score | Opposition Score | Rank | Opposition Score | Opposition Score | Opposition Score | Opposition Score | Rank |
|---|---|---|---|---|---|---|---|---|---|---|
| Jason-Ray Khalil; Sunil Seth | Men's doubles | Clyne / Lobban (SCO); L 0 - 2 | Chilambwe / Ndhlovu (ZAM); W 2 - 1 | —N/a | 2 Q | Cuskelly / Pilley (AUS); L 0 - 2 | Did not advance | | | |
| Taylor Fernandes; Mary Fung-A-Fat | Women's doubles | Cornett / Todd (CAN); L 0 - 2 | Hennings / West (CAY); L 0 - 2 | Grinham / Urquhart (AUS); L 0 - 2 | 4 | —N/a | Did not advance | | | |
| Mary Fung-A-Fat; Jason-Ray Khalil | Mixed doubles | Pallikal Karthik / Ghosal (IND); L 0 - 2 | Zafar / Aslam (PAK); L 0 - 2 | —N/a | 3 | Did not advance | | | | |
| Taylor Fernandes; Sunil Seth | Mixed doubles | Urquhart / Pilley (AUS); L 0 - 2 | Zafar / Zaman (PAK); L 0 - 2 | —N/a | 3 | Did not advance | | | | |

== Swimming ==
Guyana's swimming team consisted of two swimmers: one male and one female.

| Athlete | Event | Heat | | Semifinal | | Final | |
| Athlete | Event | Time | Rank | Time | Rank | Time | Rank |
|---|---|---|---|---|---|---|---|
| Andrew Fowler | Men's 50 m freestyle | 24.87 | 44th | Did not qualify | | | |
| Andrew Fowler | Men's 100 m freestyle | 56.33 | 50th | Did not qualify | | | |
| Andrew Fowler | Men's 50 m butterfly | 27.23 | 44th | Did not qualify | | | |
| Jamila Sanmoogan | Women's 50 m freestyle | 28.86 | 34th | Did not qualify | | | |
| Jamila Sanmoogan | Women's 100 m freestyle | 1:03.39 | 32nd | Did not qualify | | | |
| Jamila Sanmoogan | Women's 50 m butterfly | 29.97 | 23rd | Did not qualify | | | |

== Table tennis ==
Guyana participated with 6 athletes (3 men and 3 women).

Singles

| Athletes | Event | Group stage | | | Round of 64 | Round of 32 | Round of 16 | Quarterfinal | Semifinal | Final | Rank |
| Athletes | Event | Opposition Score | Opposition Score | Rank | Opposition Score | Opposition Score | Opposition Score | Opposition Score | Opposition Score | Opposition Score | Rank |
|---|---|---|---|---|---|---|---|---|---|---|---|
| Shemar Britton | Men's singles | Mtalaso (TAN); W 4 - 0 | Bernadet (CAN); L 3 - 4 | 2 | Did not advance | | | | | | |
| Nigel Bryan | Men's singles | Sam (GHA); L 2 - 4 | Knight (BAR); L 1 - 4 | 3 | Did not advance | | | | | | |
| Christopher Franklin | Men's singles | Spencer (SVG); W 4 - 0 | Chan Yook Fo (MRI); L 1 - 4 | 2 | Did not advance | | | | | | |
| Natalie Cummings | Women's singles | Mwaisyula (TAN); W 4 - 2 | Ho (MAS); L 1 - 4 | 2 | —N/a | Did not advance | | | | | |
| Priscilla Greaves | Women's singles | Ramasawmy (MRI); L 1 - 4 | Cote (CAN); L 0 - 4 | 3 | —N/a | Did not advance | | | | | |
| Trenace Lowe | Women's singles | Lyne (MAS); L 1 - 4 | Li (FIJ); W 4 - 1 | 2 | —N/a | Did not advance | | | | | |

Doubles

| Athletes | Event | Round of 64 | Round of 32 | Round of 16 | Quarterfinal | Semifinal | Final | Rank |
| Athletes | Event | Opposition Score | Opposition Score | Opposition Score | Opposition Score | Opposition Score | Opposition Score | Rank |
|---|---|---|---|---|---|---|---|---|
| Shemar Britton; Christopher Franklin | Men's doubles | Bye | Desai / Shetty (IND); L 0 - 3 | Did not advance | | | | |
| Natalie Cummings; Trenace Lowe | Women's doubles | —N/a | Bye | Feng / Yu (SGP); L 0 - 3 | Did not advance | | | |
| Trenace Lowe; Christopher Franklin | Mixed doubles | Bye | Carter / Feng (AUS); L 0 - 3 | Did not advance | | | | |
| Natalie Cummings; Nigel Bryan | Mixed doubles | St. Louis / Chung (TTO); L 0 - 3 | Did not advance | | | | | |
| Priscilla Greaves; Shemar Britton | Mixed doubles | Tommy / Lulu (VAN); W 3 - 0 | Poh / Lin (SGP); L 0 - 3 | Did not advance | | | | |

Team

| Athletes | Event | Group stage | | | Round of 16 | Quarterfinal | Semifinal | Final | Rank |
| Athletes | Event | Opposition Score | Opposition Score | Rank | Opposition Score | Opposition Score | Opposition Score | Opposition Score | Rank |
|---|---|---|---|---|---|---|---|---|---|
| Shemar Britton; Nigel Bryan; Christopher Franklin | Men's team | England; L 0-3 | Ghana; W 3–1 | 2 Q | Canada; L 0-3 | Did not advance | | | |
| Natalie Cummings; Priscilla Greaves; Trenace Lowe | Women's team | England; L 0-3 | Vanuatu; W 3–2 | 2 Q | —N/a | Singapore; L 0-3 | Did not advance | | |
