= Michael Wixey =

Welsh sport shooter

Personal information
- Nationality: Welsh
- Born: 4 June 1971 (age 55)

Sport
- Sport: Shooting
- Event: Olympic Trap
Medal record
Men's shooting
Representing Wales
Commonwealth Games
Gold medal – first place	2018 Gold Coast	Trap
Commonwealth Championships
Silver medal – second place	2017 Brisbane	Trap

Michael Wixey (born 4 June 1971) is a Welsh sport shooter. He competed in the men's trap event at the 2018 Commonwealth Games, winning the gold medal.
