= Falkland Islands at the 2018 Commonwealth Games =

- Flag of the Falkland Islands
- CGF code: FLK
- CGA: Falkland Islands Overseas Games Association
- Website: fioga.co.fk

in Gold Coast, Australia 4 April 2018 – 15 April 2018
- Competitors: 15 in 2 sports
- Flag bearer: Graham Didlick (opening)
- Medals: Gold 0 Silver 0 Bronze 0 Total 0

Commonwealth Games appearances (overview)
- 1982; 1986; 1990; 1994; 1998; 2002; 2006; 2010; 2014; 2018; 2022; 2026; 2030

The Falkland Islands competed at the 2018 Commonwealth Games in the Gold Coast, Australia from 4 April to 15 April 2018. It was the Falkland Islands's 10th appearance at the Commonwealth Games.

The Falkland Islands team consisted of 15 (eleven men and four women) athletes competing in two sports: badminton and shooting. The team also had 11 officials.

Sport shooter Graham Didlick was the island's flag bearer during the opening ceremony.

== Competitors ==
The following is the list of the number of competitors who participated at the Games per sport/discipline.

Sport	Men	Women	Total
Badminton	3	2	5
Shooting	8	2	10
Total	11	4	15

== Badminton ==
The Falkland Islands participated with five athletes (three men and two women).

Singles

Athlete	Event	Round of 64	Round of 32	Round of 16	Quarterfinal	Semifinal	Final / BM	
Athlete	Event	Opposition Score	Opposition Score	Opposition Score	Opposition Score	Opposition Score	Opposition Score	Rank
Tobi Adeoye	Men's singles	Victor Munga (KEN); L 0–2	Did not advance					
Douglas Clark	Men's singles	Brian Kasirye (UGA); L 0–2	Did not advance					
Christopher Eynon	Men's singles	Niluka Karunaratne (SRI); L 0–2	Did not advance					
Cheryl March	Women's singles	Grace Chua Hui Zen (SGP); L 0–2	Did not advance					
Zoe Morris	Women's singles	BYE	Wendy Chen Hsuan-yu (AUS); L 0–2	Did not advance				

Doubles

Athlete	Event	Round of 64	Round of 32	Round of 16	Quarterfinal	Semifinal	Final / BM	
Athlete	Event	Opposition Score	Opposition Score	Opposition Score	Opposition Score	Opposition Score	Opposition Score	Rank
Tobi Adeoye; Douglas Clark	Men's doubles	—N/a	Aatish Lubah (MRI); Christopher Jean Paul (MRI); L W/O	Did not advance				
Cheryl March; Zoe Morris	Women's doubles	—N/a	Michelle Butler-Emmett (RSA); Elsie de Villiers (RSA); L 0–2	Did not advance				
Cheryl March; Douglas Clark	Mixed doubles	Ciaran Chambers (NIR); Sinead Chambers (NIR); L W/O	Did not advance					
Zoe Morris; Tobi Adeoye	Mixed doubles	Samuel Ricketts (JAM); Katherine Wynter (JAM); L 0–2	Did not advance					

== Shooting ==
The Falkland Islands entered ten sport shooters (eight male and two female).

Men

Athlete	Event	Qualification		Final	
Athlete	Event	Points	Rank	Points	Rank
Michael Goss	50 metre rifle prone	DNS		Did not advance	
Murray Middleton	10 metre air pistol	514	22	Did not advance	
Nevin Middleton	10 metre air pistol	536	19	Did not advance	
Graham Didlick	Trap	60	40	Did not advance	
Shaun Jaffray	Trap	93	34	Did not advance	
Graham Didlick	Double trap	79	24	Did not advance	
Glen Smith	Double trap	69	27	Did not advance	

Women

Athlete	Event	Qualification		Final	
Athlete	Event	Points	Rank	Points	Rank
Tansie Bonner	10 metre air pistol	327	22	Did not advance	
Charlotte-Anne Middleton	10 metre air pistol	326	23	Did not advance	

Open

Athlete	Event	Day 1		Day 2		Day 3		Total	
Athlete	Event	Points	Rank	Points	Rank	Points	Rank	Overall	Rank
Christian Berntsen	Queen's prize individual	95-6v	29	144-10v	22	139-8v	28	378-24v	26
Mark Dodd	Queen's prize individual	102-9v	22	144-7v	24	145-10v	19	391-26v	23
Christian Berntsen; Mark Dodd	Queen's prize pairs	285-21v	12	262-13v	12	—N/a		547-34v	12
