= Northern Ireland at the 2018 Commonwealth Games =

- Flag of Northern Ireland
- CG code: NIR
- CGA: Northern Ireland Commonwealth Games Council
- Website: nicgc.org

in Gold Coast, Australia 4 April 2018 – 15 April 2018
- Competitors: 90 in 13 sports
- Flag bearer: Caroline O’Hanlon (opening)
- Medals Ranked 20th: Gold 1 Silver 7 Bronze 4 Total 12

Commonwealth Games appearances (overview)
- 1934; 1938; 1950; 1954; 1958; 1962; 1966; 1970; 1974; 1978; 1982; 1986; 1990; 1994; 1998; 2002; 2006; 2010; 2014; 2018; 2022; 2026; 2030

Other related appearances
- Ireland (1930)

Northern Ireland competed at the 2018 Commonwealth Games in the Gold Coast, Australia from April 4 to April 15, 2018. On January 3, 2017 Northern Ireland announced its decision to send a squad of 88 athletes to the games. A final team of 90 competed.

Netball athlete Caroline O’Hanlon was the country's flag bearer during the opening ceremony.

== Medalists ==
Medal	Name	Sport	Event	Date
Gold	Rhys McClenaghan	Gymnastics	Men's Pommel horse	April 8
Silver	Kirsty Barr	Shooting	Women's Trap	April 13
Silver	Brendan Irvine	Boxing	Men's −52 kg	April 14
Silver	Kurt Walker	Boxing	Men's −56 kg	April 14
Silver	Aidan Walsh	Boxing	Men's −69 kg	April 14
Silver	Kristina O'Hara	Boxing	Women's −48 kg	April 14
Silver	Carly McNaul	Boxing	Women's −51 kg	April 14
Silver	Michaela Walsh	Boxing	Women's −57 kg	April 14
Bronze	Gareth McAuley	Shooting	Men's Skeet	April 9
Bronze	Leon Reid	Athletics	Men's 200 m	April 12
Bronze	James McGivern	Boxing	Men's −60 kg	April 14
Bronze	Steven Donnelly	Boxing	Men's −75 kg	April 14

== Competitors ==
The following is the list of number of competitors participating at the Games per sport/discipline.

Sport	Men	Women	Total
Athletics	8	5	13
Badminton	1	2	3
Boxing	8	4	12
Cycling	5	3	8
Gymnastics	2	0	2
Lawn bowls	5	5	10
Netball	—N/a	12	12
Shooting	6	2	8
Swimming	8	1	9
Table tennis	4	0	4
Triathlon	3	0	3
Weightlifting	3	2	5
Wrestling	0	1	1
Total	53	37	90

== Athletics ==
Northern Ireland competed with a team of 13 athletes (8 men, 5 women) at the 2018 Commonwealth Games.

Men
Track & road events

Athlete	Event	Heat		Semifinal		Final	
Athlete	Event	Result	Rank	Result	Rank	Result	Rank
(Republic of Ireland) Leon Reid	200 m	20.73	2 Q	20.61	2 Q	20.55	3rd place, bronze medalist(s)
(United Kingdom) Jack Agnew	1500 m (T54)	3:13.78	5 q	—N/a		3:19.03	10
(Republic of Ireland) Ben Reynolds	110 m hurdles	13.70	4	—N/a		did not advance	
(United Kingdom) Adam Kirk-Smith	3000 m steeplechase	—N/a				8:48.40	8
(Republic of Ireland) Paul Pollock	Marathon	—N/a				DNS	
(Republic of Ireland) Kevin Seaward	Marathon	—N/a				2:19:54	4

Field events

Athlete	Event	Qualification		Final	
Athlete	Event	Distance	Rank	Distance	Rank
(Republic of Ireland) Adam McMullen	Long jump	7.66	14	did not advance	
(Republic of Ireland) Dempsey McGuigan	Hammer throw	—N/a		70.24	6

Women
Track & road events

Athlete	Event	Heat		Semifinal		Final	
Athlete	Event	Result	Rank	Result	Rank	Result	Rank
(Republic of Ireland) Amy Foster	100 m	11.59	2 Q	11.54	4	did not advance	
(Republic of Ireland) Amy Foster	200 m	23.94	4 Q	24.02	8	did not advance	
(Republic of Ireland) Ciara Mageean	800 m	2:03.30	7	—N/a		did not advance	
(Republic of Ireland) Ciara Mageean	1500 m	4:07.78	6 q	—N/a		4:07.41	13
(Republic of Ireland) Emma Mitchell	5000 m	—N/a				16:02.80	13
(Republic of Ireland) Emma Mitchell	10000 m	—N/a				32:49.91	15

Field events

Athlete	Event	Final	
Athlete	Event	Distance	Position
(Republic of Ireland) Sommer Lecky	High jump	1.80	10

Combined events – Heptathlon

Athlete	Event	100H	HJ	SP	200 m	LJ	JT	800 m	Final	Rank
(Republic of Ireland) Kate O'Connor	Result	14.99	1.78	11.97	25.25	5.64	46.34	2:18.30	5695	8
(Republic of Ireland) Kate O'Connor	Points	843	953	659	863	741	789	847	5695	8

== Badminton ==
Northern Ireland competed with a team of 3 athletes (1 man, 2 women) at the 2018 Commonwealth Games.

Athlete	Event	Round of 64	Round of 32	Round of 16	Quarterfinal	Semifinal	Final / BM	
Athlete	Event	Opposition Score	Opposition Score	Opposition Score	Opposition Score	Opposition Score	Opposition Score	Rank
Ciaran Chambers	Men's singles	Bye	Karunaratna (SRI); L 0–2	did not advance				
Rachael Darragh	Women's singles	Ngadjui (CMR); W 2–0	Cheah (MAS); L 0–2	did not advance				
Sinead Chambers; Rachael Darragh	Women's doubles	—N/a	Elise Dixon & Emily Temple Redshaw (JER); W 2–0	Cheah & Lai (MAS); L 0–2	did not advance			
Sinead Chambers; Ciaran Chambers	Mixed doubles	Clark & March (FAI); W W/O	Goh & Lai (MAS); L 0–2	did not advance				

== Boxing ==
Northern Ireland competed with a team of 12 athletes (8 men, 4 women) at the 2018 Commonwealth Games.

Men

Athlete	Event	Round of 32	Round of 16	Quarterfinals	Semifinals	Final	Rank
Athlete	Event	Opposition Result	Opposition Result	Opposition Result	Opposition Result	Opposition Result	Rank
Brendan Irvine	−52 kg	—N/a	Jabali Breedy (BAR); W 5–0	Rajab Mahommed (BOT); W 4–1	McFadden (SCO); W 4–1	Gourav Solanki (IND); L 1–4	2nd place, silver medalist(s)
Kurt Walker	−56 kg	—N/a	Bowen (AUS); W 4–1	Mokhotho (LES); W 4–1	Eric Basran (CAN); W 3–2	McGrail (ENG); L 1–4	2nd place, silver medalist(s)
James McGivern	−60 kg	Bye	Emmaniel Ngoma (ZAM); W RSC	Jean Colin (boxer) (MRI); W 5–0	Kaushik (IND); L 1–4	Did not advance	3rd place, bronze medalist(s)
Seán McComb	−64 kg	Bye	McCormack (ENG); L 1–4	did not advance			
Aidan Walsh	−69 kg	Bye	Gul Zaib (PAK); W 5–0	Leroy Hindley (NZL); W 5–0	Hill (FIJ); W 5–0	McCormack (ENG); L 0–5	2nd place, silver medalist(s)
Steven Donnelly	−75 kg	Kyran Jones (WAL); W 4–1	Gibrilla Kamara (SLE); W 5–0	Henry Tyrell (SAM); W 5–0	Yadav (IND); L 0–5	Did not advance	3rd place, bronze medalist(s)
Damien Sullivan	−91 kg	—N/a	Bye	Whateley (AUS); L 1–4	did not advance		
Stephen McMonagle	+91 kg	—N/a	Bye	Mailata (NZL); L 0–5	did not advance		

Women

Athlete	Event	Round of 16	Quarterfinals	Semifinals	Final	Rank
Athlete	Event	Opposition Result	Opposition Result	Opposition Result	Opposition Result	Rank
Kristina O'Hara	−48 kg	—N/a	Lynsey Holdaway (WAL); W 3–2	Benny (NZL); W 5–0	Kom (IND); L 0–5	2nd place, silver medalist(s)
Carly McNaul	−51 kg	—N/a	Ayisat Oriyomi (NGR); W ABD	Christine Ongare (KEN); W 5–0	Whiteside (ENG); L 0–5	2nd place, silver medalist(s)
Michaela Walsh	−57 kg	Bye	Keamogetse Kenosi (BOT); W RSC	Pritchard (NZL); W 4–1	Nicolson (AUS); L 2–3	2nd place, silver medalist(s)
Alanna Nihell	−60 kg	Bye	Murney (ENG); L 0–5	did not advance		

== Cycling ==
Northern Ireland competed with a team of 8 athletes (5 men, 3 women) at the 2018 Commonwealth Games.

=== Road ===
Men

Athlete	Event	Time	Rank
Marcus Christie	Road race	DNF	
Mark Downey	Road race	3:57:01	4
Cameron Orr	Road race	3:57:58	22
Marc Potts	Road race	3:59:08	28
Xeno Young	Road race	DNF	
Marcus Christie	Time trial	50:42.29	7
Xeno Young	Time trial	54:07.66	25

Women

Athlete	Event	Time	Rank
Lydia Boylan	Road race	3:12:48	32
Eileen Burns	Road race	DNF	
Eileen Burns	Time trial	40:21.53	11

=== Track ===
Sprint

Athlete	Event	Qualification		Round 1	Quarterfinals	Semifinals	Final	
Athlete	Event	Time	Rank	Opposition Time	Opposition Time	Opposition Time	Opposition Time	Rank
Robyn Stewart	Women's sprint	11.082	9	Cumming (NZL); L	did not advance			

Keirin

Athlete	Event	Round 1	Repechage	Semifinals	Final
Robyn Stewart	Women's keirin	2 Q	Bye	4 qB	12

Time trial

Athlete	Event	Time	Rank
Robyn Stewart	Women's time trial		

Pursuit

Athlete	Event	Qualification		Final	
Athlete	Event	Time	Rank	Opponent Results	Rank
Marcus Christie	Men's pursuit	4:35.402	20	did not advance	
Xeno Young	Men's pursuit	4:24.568	14	did not advance	
Eileen Burns	Women's pursuit	3:42.486	17	did not advance	

Points race

Athlete	Event	Qualification		Final	
Athlete	Event	Points	Rank	Points	Rank
Mark Downey	Men's point race	2	13	did not advance	
Marc Potts	Men's point race	5	12 Q	7	12
Xeno Young	Men's point race	3	13	did not advance	
Lydia Boylan	Women's points race	—N/a		3	11

Scratch race

Athlete	Event	Qualification	Final
Mark Downey	Men's scratch race	4 Q	12
Marc Potts	Men's scratch race	12 Q	DNF
Xeno Young	Men's scratch race	11 Q	DNF
Lydia Boylan	Women's scratch race	—N/a	8

=== Mountain bike ===
Athlete	Event	Time	Rank
Cameron Orr	Men's cross-country	1:20:06	8
Marc Potts	Men's cross-country	-2LAP	17

== Gymnastics ==
Northern Ireland competed with a team of 2 athletes (2 men) at the 2018 Commonwealth Games.

=== Artistic ===
Men
Individual Qualification

Athlete	Event	Apparatus						Total	Rank
Athlete	Event	F	PH	R	V	PB	HB	Total	Rank
Ewan McAteer	Qualification	12.850	12.650	9.800	13.150	12.150	11.650	73.000	23 R
Rhys McClenaghan	Qualification	12.250	14.550 Q	12.250	12.950	12.850	11.750	76.600	15 Q

Individual Finals

Athlete	Event	Apparatus						Total	Rank
Athlete	Event	F	PH	R	V	PB	HB	Total	Rank
Ewan McAteer	All-around	11.900	10.700	10.300	14.000	12.850	11.950	71.700	18
Rhys McClenaghan	All-around	12.050	15.050	12.050	14.000	13.000	12.150	78.300	10
Rhys McClenaghan	Pommel horse	—N/a	15.100	—N/a				15.100	1st place, gold medalist(s)

== Lawn bowls ==
Northern Ireland competed with a team of 10 athletes (5 men, 5 women) at the 2018 Commonwealth Games.

Men

Athlete	Event	Group Stage						Quarterfinal	Semifinal	Final / BM	
Athlete	Event	Opposition Score	Opposition Score	Opposition Score	Opposition Score	Opposition Score	Rank	Opposition Score	Opposition Score	Opposition Score	Rank
Gary Kelly	Singles	Bazo (PNG); W 21 - 4	de Sousa (JER); W 21 - 20	Gaborutwe (BOT); W 21 - 13	McGreal (IOM); W 21 - 7	Bester (CAN); L 12 - 21	2 Q	Wilson (AUS); L 9 - 21	did not advance		
Gary Kelly; Ian McClure	Pairs	Jamaica; W 28 - 6	Isle of Man; W 20 - 6	South Africa; L 16 - 20	Wales; L 8 - 27	—N/a	3	did not advance			
Andrew Kyle; Simon Martin; Martin McHugh	Triples	Malaysia; D 16 - 16	Norfolk Island; L 11 - 21	Cook Islands; L 17 - 18	Scotland; W 16 - 14	—N/a	5	did not advance			
Andrew Kyle; Simon Martin; Ian McClure; Martin McHugh	Fours	Namibia; W 17 - 11	Niue; W 21 - 10	Fiji; W 24 - 4	Malaysia; W 17 - 8	—N/a	1 Q	Australia; L 9 - 13	did not advance		

Women

Athlete	Event	Group Stage					Quarterfinal	Semifinal	Final / BM	
Athlete	Event	Opposition Score	Opposition Score	Opposition Score	Opposition Score	Rank	Opposition Score	Opposition Score	Opposition Score	Rank
Catherine Beattie	Singles	Getrude Siame (ZAM); W 21 - 14	Collen Piketh (RSA); L 13 - 21	Malia Kioa (TGA); W 21 - 13	Murphy (AUS); L 17 - 21	3	did not advance			
Sandra Bailie; Catherine Beattie	Pairs	South Africa; L 12 - 20	India; W 15 - 14	Wales; L 13 - 18	Jersey; W 27 - 8	3	did not advance			
Sarah McAuley; Donna McCloy; Erin Smith	Triples	England; L 8 - 16	South Africa; W 14 - 13	Niue; W 28 - 7	—N/a	2 Q	Australia; L 5 - 30	did not advance		
Sandra Bailie; Sarah McAuley; Donna McCloy; Erin Smith	Fours	India; L 10 - 18	Fiji; L 16 - 17	Malta; L 8 - 21	England; W 15 - 14	5	did not advance			

== Netball ==
The Northern Ireland national netball team qualified for the Netball at the 2018 Commonwealth Games due to being ranked in the top 11 of the INF World Rankings on July 1, 2017. Northern Ireland announced its team of 12 athletes on January 3, 2017. 2018 saw Northern Ireland make their second appearance at the Commonwealth Games. Netball team captain, Caroline O'Hanlon, carried the flag of Northern Ireland during the 2018 Commonwealth Games opening ceremony. Northern Ireland eventually finished eighth after losing to Malawi by 60–52 in a classification match.

Northern Ireland – 2018 Commonwealth Games roster
Players
Coaches

Name	Pos	DOB	Height	Club	Nat	Caps
Kyla Bowman	GS, GA	April 19, 1990 (aged 27)	1.80 m (5 ft 11 in)	Larkfield	(Northern Ireland)
Lisa Bowman	GS	November 2, 1988 (aged 29)	1.88 m (6 ft 2 in)	Team Northumbria	(England)
Niamh Cooper	WD	July 29, 1992 (aged 25)	1.74 m (5 ft 9 in)	Kingsway	(Northern Ireland)
Michelle Drayne	WD, C, WA	September 22, 1988 (aged 29)	1.67 m (5 ft 6 in)	Hertfordshire Mavericks	(England)
Gemma Lawlor	GK, GD	April 30, 1987 (aged 30)	1.79 m (5 ft 10 in)	Belfast Ladies	(Northern Ireland)
Noleen Lennon	GS, GK	March 22, 1984 (aged 34)	1.86 m (6 ft 1 in)	Belfast Ladies	(Northern Ireland)
Michelle Magee	WD, GD	January 13, 2000 (aged 18)	1.80 m (5 ft 11 in)	Kingsway	(Northern Ireland)
Lisa McCaffrey	WA, C	September 21, 1986 (aged 31)	1.69 m (5 ft 7 in)	Belfast Ladies	(Northern Ireland)
Oonagh McCullough	GA, GS	January 6, 1987 (aged 31)	1.76 m (5 ft 9 in)	Belfast Ladies	(Northern Ireland)
Caroline O'Hanlon (c)	C, WA	August 8, 1984 (aged 33)	1.74 m (5 ft 9 in)	Manchester Thunder	(England)
Fionnuala Toner	WD	March 6, 1990 (aged 28)	1.76 m (5 ft 9 in)	Belfast Ladies	(Northern Ireland)
Neamh Woods	WA, C, WD	May 3, 1989 (aged 28)	1.70 m (5 ft 7 in)	Larkfield	(Northern Ireland)

Head coach

- Elaine Rice

Assistant coach

- Clar-Rois McGuinness

Manager: Karen Rollo

Notes

- (c) – Captain
- (cc) – Co-captain
- (vc) – Vice-captain
- – Injury / maternity leave
- (TRP) – Temporary Replacement Player
Player profiles: Team website
Last updated: 5 January 2020

Pool A

Pos	Team	Pld	W	D	L	GF	GA	GD	Pts	Qualification
1	Australia (H)	5	5	0	0	413	162	+251	10	Semi-finals
2	Jamaica	5	4	0	1	351	221	+130	8	Semi-finals
3	South Africa	5	3	0	2	310	205	+105	6	Classification matches
4	Northern Ireland	5	2	0	3	224	307	−83	4	Classification matches
5	Barbados	5	1	0	4	185	333	−148	2	Classification matches
6	Fiji	5	0	0	5	171	426	−255	0	Classification matches

Updated to match(es) played on 11 April 2018. Source: GC2018
(H) Hosts

5 April 2018
20:30

Report
Australia
94–26
Northern Ireland

Gold Coast Convention and Exhibition Centre
Umpires: Maria van der Merwe
Jono Bredin
Reserve umpire: Lisa McPhail
Thwaites 39/39 (100%)
Bassett 31/34 (91%)
Pettitt 13/13 (100%)
Wood 11/15 (73%)

L. Bowman 13/22 (59%)
McCullogh 6/9 (67%)
Lennon 4/6 (67%)
K. Bowman 3/4 (75%)

7 April 2018
15:00

Report
Northern Ireland
35–49
South Africa

Gold Coast Convention and Exhibition Centre
Umpires: Kate Stephenson
Lisa McPhail
Reserve umpire: Jackie Mizon
L. Bowman 21/25 (84%)
Lennon 5/6 (83%)
McCullogh 5/11 (45%)
K. Bowman 4/7 (57%)

Burger 38/41 (93%)
Venter 7/9 (78%)
Holtzhausen 4/9 (44%)

8 April 2018
13:00

Report
Jamaica
79–41
Northern Ireland

Gold Coast Convention and Exhibition Centre
Umpires: Jackie Mizon
Kristie Simpson
Reserve umpire: Angela Armstrong-Lush
Fowler-Reid 32/33 (97%)
Aiken 26/28 (93%)
Beckford 11/11 (100%)
Robinson 10/11 (91%)

Bowman 23/32 (72%)
K. Bowman 11/16 (69%)
Lennon 7/8 (88%)

10 April 2018
13:00

Report
Barbados
39–49
Northern Ireland

Gold Coast Convention and Exhibition Centre
Umpires: Theresa Prince
Gary Burgess
Reserve umpire: Maria van der Merwe
Wharton 27/29 (93%)
Blackman 9/12 (75%)
Payne 3/3 (100%)

L. Bowman 20/25 (80%)
Lennon 15/16 (94%)
Oonagh McCullough 9/15 (60%)
K. Bowman 5/7 (71%)

11 April 2018
14:00

Report
Northern Ireland
73–46
Fiji

Gold Coast Convention and Exhibition Centre
Umpires: Kristie Simpson
Maria van der Merwe
Reserve umpire: Gary Burgess
L. Bowman 59/65 (91%)
McCullough 10/14 (71%)
K. Bowman 4/8 (50%)

M. Rusivakula 25/32 (78%)
Waqa 21/30 (70%)

Seventh place match

12 April 2018
14:00

Report
Malawi
60–52
Northern Ireland

Gold Coast Convention and Exhibition Centre
Umpires: Kristie Simpson
Theresa Prince
Reserve umpire: Jono Bredin
Kumwenda 48/51 (94%)
Chimaliro 8/10 (80%)
Mvula 4/7 (57%)

L. Bowman 33/38 (87%)
K. Bowman 9/11 (82%)
Lennon 6/9 (67%)
McCullough 4/7 (57%)

== Shooting ==
Northern Ireland competed with a team of 8 athletes (6 men, 2 women) at the 2018 Commonwealth Games.

Men

Athlete	Event	Qualification		Final	
Athlete	Event	Points	Rank	Points	Rank
[[Rory Hamilton| (Republic of Ireland) Rory Hamilton]]	50 metre rifle 3 positions	1129	14	did not advance	
(Republic of Ireland) Stuart Hill	50 metre rifle 3 positions	1096	16	did not advance	
(Republic of Ireland) Rory Hamilton	50 metre rifle prone	604.8	19	did not advance	
(Republic of Ireland) Stuart Hill	50 metre rifle prone	607.7	14	did not advance	
(Republic of Ireland) David Henning	Trap	115	11	did not advance	
[[Gareth McAuley (sport shooter)| (United Kingdom) Gareth McAuley]]	Skeet	119	4 Q	45	3rd place, bronze medalist(s)

Women

Athlete	Event	Qualification		Final	
Athlete	Event	Points	Rank	Points	Rank
[[Gareth McAuley (sport shooter)| (United Kingdom) ]] Kirsty Barr	Trap	69	3 Q	37	2nd place, silver medalist(s)
(Republic of Ireland) Alexandra Skeggs	Skeet	62	10	did not advance	

Open

Athlete	Event	Day 1		Day 2		Day 3		Total	
Athlete	Event	Points	Rank	Points	Rank	Points	Rank	Overall	Rank
[[Gareth McAuley (sport shooter)| (United Kingdom) ]] Jack Alexander	Queen's prize individual	104-11v	12	146-13v	20	146-18	15	396-40v	17
[[Gareth McAuley (sport shooter)| (United Kingdom) ]] David Calvert	Queen's prize individual	105-9v	9	148-18v	11	146-13v	16	399-40v	12
[[Gareth McAuley (sport shooter)| (United Kingdom) ]] Jack Alexander [[Gareth McAuley (sport shooter)| (United Kingdom) ]] David Calvert	Queen's prize pairs	298-30v	5	281-19v	7	—N/a		579-49v	7

== Swimming ==
Northern Ireland competed with a team of 9 athletes (8 men, 1 woman) at the 2018 Commonwealth Games.

Men

Athlete	Event	Heat		Semifinal		Final	
Athlete	Event	Time	Rank	Time	Rank	Time	Rank
Calum Bain	50 m freestyle	22.53	12 Q	22.39	10	did not advance	
Jordan Sloan	50 m freestyle	23.19	20	did not advance			
David Thompson	50 m freestyle	23.29	21	did not advance			
Calum Bain	100 m freestyle	50.47	21	did not advance			
Jordan Sloan	100 m freestyle	49.72	12 Q	49.88	15	did not advance	
David Thompson	100 m freestyle	50.22	22	did not advance			
Barry McClements	100 m freestyle S9	1:00.93	7 Q	—N/a		1:00.34	7
James Brown	200 m freestyle	1:53.23	21	—N/a		did not advance	
Jordan Sloan	200 m freestyle	1:48.16	9	—N/a		did not advance	
Conor Ferguson	50 m backstroke	25.79	4 Q	25.60	5 Q	25.72	5
Conor Ferguson	100 m backstroke	55.54	9 Q	54.48	4 Q	55.01	8
Conor Ferguson	200 m backstroke	2:00.77	9	—N/a		did not advance	
Barry McClements	100 m backstroke S9	1:08.81	8 Q	—N/a		1:09.08	8
Jaime Graham	50 m breaststroke	28.80	14 Q	28.66	14	did not advance	
Jaime Graham	100 m breaststroke	DSQ		did not advance			
Calum Bain	50 m butterfly	24.45	11 Q	24.43	11	did not advance	
Curtis Coulter	50 m butterfly	25.53	29	did not advance			
David Thompson	50 m butterfly	24.77	18	did not advance			
James Brown	100 m butterfly	55.14	16 Q	55.13	16	did not advance	
Curtis Coulter	100 m butterfly	56.57	20	did not advance			
James Brown	200 m individual medley	2:03.34	16	—N/a		did not advance	
Jordan Sloan; Calum Bain; David Thompson; Curtis Coulter	4 × 100 m freestyle relay	3:19.57	6 Q	—N/a		3:20.03	7
Conor Ferguson; Jaime Graham; James Brown; Jordan Sloan; David Thompson*	4 × 100 m medley relay	3:42.99	6 Q	—N/a		3:41.08	6

* Participated in heats only.

Women

Athlete	Event	Heat		Semifinal		Final	
Athlete	Event	Time	Rank	Time	Rank	Time	Rank
Danielle Hill	50 m freestyle	26.02	13 Q	25.80	8 Q	25.56	8
Danielle Hill	100 m freestyle	DNS		did not advance			
Danielle Hill	50 m backstroke	29.27	13 Q	28.86	12	did not advance	
Danielle Hill	100 m backstroke	1:03.08	16 Q	1:02.62	14	did not advance	

== Table tennis ==
Northern Ireland competed with a team of 4 athletes (4 men) at the 2018 Commonwealth Games.

Singles

Athletes	Event	Group Stage			Round of 64	Round of 32	Round of 16	Quarterfinal	Semifinal	Final	Rank
Athletes	Event	Opposition Score	Opposition Score	Rank	Opposition Score	Opposition Score	Opposition Score	Opposition Score	Opposition Score	Opposition Score	Rank
Owen Cathcart	Men's singles	Mitchell (SVG); W 4–0	Ranasingha (SRI); W 4–3	1 Q	Abiodun (NGR); L 1–4	did not advance					
Paul McCreery	Men's singles	Katungu (ZAM); W 4–0	Wing (FIJ); W 4–0	1 Q	Bye	Poh (SGP); W 4–0	Walker (ENG); L 0–4	did not advance			
Ashley Robinson	Men's singles	Nyaika (UGA); W 4–0	St. Louis (TTO); W 4–0	1 Q	Bye	Drinkhall (ENG); L 0–4	did not advance				

Doubles

Athletes	Event	Round of 64	Round of 32	Round of 16	Quarterfinal	Semifinal	Final	Rank
Athletes	Event	Opposition Score	Opposition Score	Opposition Score	Opposition Score	Opposition Score	Opposition Score	Rank
Paul McCreery; Ashley Robinson	Men's doubles	Bye	Melton / Vaea (TUV); W 3–0	Desai / Shetty (IND); L 0–3	did not advance			
Owen Cathcart; Zak Wilson	Men's doubles	Bye	Howieson / Rumgay (SCO); L 0–3	did not advance				

Team

Athletes	Event	Group Stage			Round of 16	Quarterfinal	Semifinal	Final	Rank
Athletes	Event	Opposition Score	Opposition Score	Rank	Opposition Score	Opposition Score	Opposition Score	Opposition Score	Rank
Owen Cathcart; Paul McCreery; Ashley Robinson; Zak Wilson	Men's team	India; L 0–3	Trinidad and Tobago; W 3–1	2 Q	Mauritius; W 3–0	England; L 0–3	did not advance		

== Triathlon ==
Northern Ireland competed with a team of 3 athletes (3 men) at the 2018 Commonwealth Games.

Individual

Athlete	Event	Swim (750 m)	Trans 1	Bike (20 km)	Trans 2	Run (5 km)	Total	Rank
Stanley Edgar	Men's	9:00	0:35	30:54	0:27	17:05	58:01	22
Russell White	Men's	9:10	0:36	27:48	0:25	16:39	54:38	14

Paratriathlon

Athlete	Event	Comp.	Swim (750 m)	Trans 1	Bike (25 km)	Trans 2	Run (5 km)	Total	Rank
David Kerr	Men's PTWC	0:00	12:44	1:59	39:56	1:15	16:36	1:12:30	6

== Weightlifting ==
Northern Ireland competed with a team of 5 athletes (3 men, 2 women) at the 2018 Commonwealth Games.

Athlete	Event	Snatch		Clean & Jerk		Total	Rank
Athlete	Event	Result	Rank	Result	Rank	Total	Rank
Karl McClean	Men's −77 kg	did not finish		did not start			
Stephen Forbes	Men's −94 kg	127	11	150	11	277	9
Cameron Montgomery	Men's +105 kg	103	12	146	11	249	11
Emma McQuiad	Women's −63 kg	82	5	100	5	182	4
Rebekah Thompson	Women's −69 kg	67	12	91	12	158	12

== Wrestling ==
Northern Ireland competed with a team of 1 athlete (1 woman) at the 2018 Commonwealth Games.

Athlete	Event	Group Stage				Semifinal	Final / BM	
Athlete	Event	Opposition Result	Opposition Result	Opposition Result	Rank	Opposition Result	Opposition Result	Rank
Sarah McDaid	Women's freestyle -57 kg	Adekuoroye (NGR); L 0 - 4	Genave (MRI); W 5 - 0	Essombe Tiako (CMR); L 0 - 5	3	did not advance		5
