= Trinidad and Tobago at the 2018 Commonwealth Games =

- Flag of Trinidad and Tobago
- CG code: TTO
- CGA: Trinidad and Tobago Olympic Committee
- Website: ttoc.org

in Gold Coast, Australia 4 April 2018 – 15 April 2018
- Competitors: 51 in 11 sports
- Flag bearer: Michelle-Lee Ahye (opening)
- Medals Ranked 18th: Gold 2 Silver 1 Bronze 0 Total 3

Commonwealth Games appearances (overview)
- 1934; 1938; 1950; 1954; 1958; 1962; 1966; 1970; 1974; 1978; 1982; 1986; 1990; 1994; 1998; 2002; 2006; 2010; 2014; 2018; 2022; 2026; 2030

Trinidad and Tobago competed at the 2018 Commonwealth Games in the Gold Coast, Australia from April 4 to April 15, 2018.

Track and field athlete Michelle-Lee Ahye was the country's flag bearer during the opening ceremony.

== Medalists ==
Medal	Name	Sport	Event	Date
Gold	Jereem Richards	Athletics	Men's 200m	April 11
Gold	Michelle-Lee Ahye	Athletics	Women's 100m	April 9
Silver	Dylan Carter	Swimming	Men's 50 m butterfly	April 6

== Competitors ==
The following is the list of number of competitors participating at the Games per sport/discipline.

Sport	Men	Women	Total
Athletics	13	11	24
Badminton	2	0	0
Beach volleyball	2	2	4
Boxing	2	0	2
Cycling	4	0	4
Gymnastics	1	0	1
Shooting	5	0	5
Squash	2	1	3
Swimming	1	0	1
Table tennis	3	1	4
Triathlon	0	1	1
Total	35	16	51

== Athletics ==
Trinidad and Tobago participated with 24 athletes (13 men and 11 women).

Men
Track & road events

Athlete	Event	Heat		Semifinal		Final	
Athlete	Event	Result	Rank	Result	Rank	Result	Rank
Keston Bledman	100 m	10.35	3 q	10.30	5	Did not advance	
Emmanuel Callender	100 m	10.41	3 q	10.54	8	Did not advance	
Jonathan Farinha	100 m	10.44	5	Did not advance			
Nathan Farinha	200 m	21.62	3	Did not advance			
Kyle Greaux	200 m	20.67	1 Q	20.66	2 Q	20.63	6
Jereem Richards	200 m	20.33	1 Q	20.41	1 Q	20.12	1st place, gold medalist(s)
Machel Cedenio	400 m	45.68	1 Q	46.19	3	Did not advance	
Lalonde Gordon	400 m	49.07	6	Did not advance			
Renny Quow	400 m	46.42	1 Q	47.21	6	Did not advance	
Keston Bledman; Marc Burns; Emmanuel Callender; Nathan Farinha	4 × 100 m relay	DSQ		—N/a		Did not advance	
Machel Cedenio; Deon Lendore; Renny Quow; Jereem Richards; Lalonde Gordon*	4 × 400 m relay	3:05.84	4 q	—N/a		3:02.85	4

* Competed in heats only.

Field events

Athlete	Event	Qualification		Final	
Athlete	Event	Distance	Rank	Distance	Rank
Akeem Stewart	Shot put	19.12 SB	9 Q	19.10	9
Akeem Stewart	Discus throw	DNS		Did not advance	
Shakeil Waithe	Javelin throw	75.21	10 q	76.85	7

Women
Track & road events

Athlete	Event	Heat		Semifinal		Final	
Athlete	Event	Result	Rank	Result	Rank	Result	Rank
Michelle-Lee Ahye	100 m	11.57	1 Q	11.25	1 Q	11.14	1st place, gold medalist(s)
Khalifa St. Fort	100 m	11.57	2 Q	11.35	3 q	11.37	6
Reyare Thomas	100 m	11.46	3 Q	11.36	2 Q	11.51	7
Kamaria Durant	200 m	23.33	3 Q	23.83	6	Did not advance	
Semoy Hackett	200 m	23.37	3 Q	22.97	3 q	23.16	7
Kai Selvon	200 m	23.33	4 Q	23.42	5	Did not advance	
Alena Brooks	800 m	2:01.81	5	—N/a		Did not advance	
Sparkle McKnight	400 m hurdles	55.15	2 Q	—N/a		57.45	7
Semoy Hackett; Kai Selvon; Khalifa St. Fort; Reyare Thomas	4 × 100 m relay	—N/a				43.50	4
Tonya Nero	Marathon	—N/a				2:55:14	14

Field events

Athlete	Event	Qualification		Final	
Athlete	Event	Distance	Position	Distance	Position
Ayanna Alexander	Triple jump	—N/a		13.47	6
Cleopatra Borel	Shot put	17.46	3 Q	18.05	4

== Badminton ==
Trinidad and Tobago participated with two athletes (two men)

Athlete	Event	Round of 64	Round of 32	Round of 16	Quarterfinal	Semifinal	Final / BM	
Athlete	Event	Opposition Score	Opposition Score	Opposition Score	Opposition Score	Opposition Score	Opposition Score	Rank
Nicholas Bonkowsky	Men's singles	BYE	Brian Kasirye (UGA); L 1 - 2	Did not advance				
Naim Mohammed	Men's singles	Antoine Owona Ndimako (CMR); W 2 - 0	Ryan Ng Zin Rei (SGP); L 0 - 2	Did not advance				
Nicholas Bonkowsky; Naim Mohammed	Men's doubles	—N/a	Chan Peng Soon (MAS); Goh Soon Huat (MAS); L 0 - 2	Did not advance				

== Beach volleyball ==
Trinidad and Tobago qualified a men's and women's beach volleyball team for a total of four athletes.

Athlete	Event	Preliminary round	Standing	Quarterfinals	Semifinals	Final / BM	
Athlete	Event	Opposition Score	Standing	Opposition Score	Opposition Score	Opposition Score	Rank
Daneil Williams; Daynte Stewart	Men's	Pool A Seabrookes – Hodge (SKN); W 2 - 0 (21 - 14, 21 - 14); Korowale – Cavula (FIJ); W 2 - 0 (21 - 9, 21 - 17); McHugh – Schumann (AUS); L 0 - 2 (13 - 21, 16 - 21)	2 Q	O'Dea – O'Dea (NZL); L 0 - 2 (15 - 21, 14 - 21)	Did not advance		
Abby Blackman; Rheeza Grant	Women's	Pool B Grimson – Palmer (ENG); L 0 - 2 (16 - 21, 12 - 21); Humana-Paredes – Pavan (CAN); L 0 - 2 (7 - 21, 8 - 21); Ratudina – Nima (FIJ); W 2 - 0 (21 - 18, 24 - 22)	3	Did not advance			

== Boxing ==
Trinidad and Tobago participated with a team of 2 athletes (2 men).

Men

Athlete	Event	Round of 32	Round of 16	Quarterfinals	Semifinals	Final	Rank
Athlete	Event	Opposition Result	Opposition Result	Opposition Result	Opposition Result	Opposition Result	Rank
Michael Alexander	−60 kg	Nicholas Okoth (KEN); W 5 - 0	Manish Kaushik (IND); L 0 - 4	Did not advance			
Nigel Paul	+91 kg	—N/a	Bye	Satish Kumar (IND); L 1 - 4	Did not advance		

== Cycling ==
Trinidad and Tobago participated with 4 athletes (4 men).

=== Track ===
Sprint

Athlete	Event	Qualification		Round 1	Quarterfinals	Semifinals	Final	
Athlete	Event	Time	Rank	Opposition Time	Opposition Time	Opposition Time	Opposition Time	Rank
Keron Bramble	Men's sprint	10.214	18	Did not advance				
Nicholas Paul	Men's sprint	9.836	13 Q	Owens (ENG); L REL	Did not advance			
Njisane Phillip	Men's sprint	9.986	15 Q	Carlin (SCO); L +2.043	Did not advance			
Kwesi Browne; Nicholas Paul; Njisane Phillip	Men's team sprint	45.386	6	—N/a			Did not advance	

Keirin

Athlete	Event	Round 1	Repechage	Semifinals	Final
Kwesi Browne	Men's keirin	3 R	2	Did not advance	
Nicholas Paul	Men's keirin	5 R	2	Did not advance	
Njisane Phillip	Men's keirin	6 R	2	Did not advance	

Time trial

Athlete	Event	Time	Rank
Nicholas Paul	Men's time trial	1:01.899	9

== Gymnastics ==
=== Artistic ===
Trinidad and Tobago participated with 1 athlete (1 man).

Men
Team Final & Individual Qualification

Athlete	Event	Apparatus						Total	Rank
Athlete	Event	F	PH	R	V	PB	HB	Total	Rank
Joseph Fox	Qualification	12.375	10.200	12.450	13.100	11.050	11.500	70.675	26

== Shooting ==
Trinidad and Tobago participated with 5 athletes (5 men).

Men

Athlete	Event	Qualification		Final	
Athlete	Event	Points	Rank	Points	Rank
Rhodney Allen	50 metre pistol	518	12	Did not advance	
Rhodney Allen	25 metre rapid fire pistol	516	12	Did not advance	
Rhodney Allen	10 metre air pistol	551	16	Did not advance	
Roger Daniel	50 metre pistol	529	9	Did not advance	
Roger Daniel	25 metre rapid fire pistol	537	10	Did not advance	
Roger Daniel	10 metre air pistol	572	2 Q	170.6	5
Marlon Moses	50 metre rifle prone	601.3	25	Did not advance	

Open

Athlete	Event	Day 1		Day 2		Day 3		Total	
Athlete	Event	Points	Rank	Points	Rank	Points	Rank	Overall	Rank
Delborn Joseph	Queen's prize individual	98-7v	27	134-6v	31	130-4v	30	362-17v	30
Michael Perez	Queen's prize individual	94-5v	31	138-8v	30	122-2v	33	354-15v	32
Delborn Joseph; Michael Perez	Queen's prize pairs	268-12v	15	232-8v	16	—N/a		500-20v	16

== Squash ==
Trinidad and Tobago participated with 3 athletes (2 men and 1 woman).

Individual

Athlete	Event	Round of 64	Round of 32	Round of 16	Quarterfinals	Semifinals	Final	
Athlete	Event	Opposition Score	Opposition Score	Opposition Score	Opposition Score	Opposition Score	Opposition Score	Rank
Mandela Patrick	Men's singles	Yuen (MAS); L 0 - 3	Did not advance					
Kale Wilson	Men's singles	Zammit Lewis (MLT); L 0 - 3	Did not advance					
Charlotte Knaggs	Women's singles	Bye	Pallikal Karthik (IND); L 0 - 3	Did not advance				

Doubles

Athlete	Event	Group stage			Round of 16	Quarterfinals	Semifinals	Final	
Athlete	Event	Opposition Score	Opposition Score	Rank	Opposition Score	Opposition Score	Opposition Score	Opposition Score	Rank
Mandela Patrick; Kale Wilson	Men's doubles	Cuskelly / Pilley (AUS); L 0 - 2	Pala / Parshottam (FIJ); W 2 - 0	2 Q	Clyne / Lobban (SCO); L 0 - 2	Did not advance			
Charlotte Knaggs; Kale Wilson	Mixed doubles	Azman / Chal (MAS); L 0 - 2	Grinham / Cuskelly (AUS); L 0 - 2	3	Did not advance				

== Swimming ==
Trinidad and Tobago participated with 1 athlete (1 man).

Men

Athlete	Event	Heat		Semifinal		Final	
Athlete	Event	Time	Rank	Time	Rank	Time	Rank
Dylan Carter	100 m freestyle	48.96	3 Q	49.06	7 Q	48.60	5
Dylan Carter	50 m butterfly	23.62	2 Q	23.90	4 Q	23.67	2nd place, silver medalist(s)

== Table tennis ==
Trinidad and Tobago participated with 4 athletes (3 men and 1 woman).

Singles

Athletes	Event	Group stage			Round of 64	Round of 32	Round of 16	Quarterfinal	Semifinal	Final	Rank
Athletes	Event	Opposition Score	Opposition Score	Rank	Opposition Score	Opposition Score	Opposition Score	Opposition Score	Opposition Score	Opposition Score	Rank
Yuvraaj Dookram	Men's singles	Leong (MAS); L 1 - 4	Lartey (GHA); L 1 - 4	3	Did not advance						
Dexter St. Louis	Men's singles	Nyaika (UGA); W 4 - 0	Robinson (NIR); L 0 - 4	2	Did not advance						
Aaron Wilson	Men's singles	Melton (TUV); W 4 - 0	Shing (VAN); W 4 - 1	1 Q	Bye	Toriola (NGR); L 1 - 4	Did not advance				
Rheann Chung	Women's singles	Kwabi (GHA); W 4 - 0	Warusawithana (SRI); W 4 - 0	1 Q	—N/a	Patkar (IND); L 1 - 4	Did not advance				

Doubles

Athletes	Event	Round of 64	Round of 32	Round of 16	Quarterfinal	Semifinal	Final	Rank
Athletes	Event	Opposition Score	Opposition Score	Opposition Score	Opposition Score	Opposition Score	Opposition Score	Rank
Yuvraaj Dookram; Aaron Wilson	Men's doubles	Mitchell / Spencer (SVG); W 3 - 1	Wing / Wu (FIJ); W 3 - 0	Hu / Yan (AUS); L 0 - 3	Did not advance			
Rheann Chung; Dexter St. Louis	Mixed doubles	Bryan / Cummings (GUY); W 3 - 0	Pang / Zhou (SGP); L 2 - 3	Did not advance				

Team

Athletes	Event	Group stage			Round of 16	Quarterfinal	Semifinal	Final	Rank
Athletes	Event	Opposition Score	Opposition Score	Rank	Opposition Score	Opposition Score	Opposition Score	Opposition Score	Rank
Yuvraaj Dookram; Dexter St. Louis; Aaron Wilson	Men's team	India; L 0 - 3	Northern Ireland; L 1 - 3	3	Did not advance				

== Triathlon ==
Trinidad and Tobago participated with 1 athlete (1 woman).

Individual

Athlete	Event	Swim (750 m)	Trans 1	Bike (20 km)	Trans 2	Run (5 km)	Total	Rank
Jenna Ross	Women's	12:43	0:48	34:46	0:31	21:37	1:10:25	21
