= Shonte Seale =

Barbadian netball player, volleyball player

Personal information
- Born: 9 February 1999 (age 26); Bridgetown
- Height: 1.79 m (5 ft 10 1/2 in)
- Occupation: netball player, volleyball player

Netball career
- Playing position(s): goal defense, wing defense, goal keeper, outside attacker

Shonte Seale (born 9 February 1999) is a Barbadian netball player who represents Barbados internationally and plays in the positions of wing defense, goal defense and goal keeper. She also plays volleyball professionally worldwide. She is a primary Outside Attacker. She made her maiden World Cup appearance representing Barbados at the 2019 Netball World Cup. She also represented Barbados at the 2018 Commonwealth Games, which also marked her maiden Commonwealth Games appearance.
