= Swimming at the 2018 Commonwealth Games – Women's 50 metre butterfly =

Women's 50 metre butterfly at the 2018 Commonwealth Games
- Venue: Gold Coast Aquatic Centre
- Dates: 7 April (heats, semifinals); 8 April (final)
- Competitors: 29 from 22 nations
- Winning time: 25.59

Medalists
gold medal	Cate Campbell	Australia
silver medal	Holly Barratt	Australia
bronze medal	Madeline Groves	Australia

The women's 50 metre butterfly event at the 2018 Commonwealth Games was held on 7 and 8 April at the Gold Coast Aquatic Centre.

== Records ==
Prior to this competition, the existing world, Commonwealth and Games records were as follows:

World record	Sarah Sjöström (SWE)	24.43	Borås, Sweden	5 July 2014
Commonwealth record	Fran Halsall (ENG)	25.20	Glasgow, United Kingdom	27 July 2014
Games record	Fran Halsall (ENG)	25.20	Glasgow, United Kingdom	27 July 2014

== Results ==
=== Heats ===
The heats were held on 7 April at 11:28.

Rank	Heat	Lane	Name	Nationality	Time	Notes
1	3	5	Madeline Groves	Australia	25.81	Q
2	4	4	Cate Campbell	Australia	25.83	Q
3	3	4	Penny Oleksiak	Canada	25.95	Q
4	2	4	Holly Barratt	Australia	26.14	Q
5	4	5	Rebecca Smith	Canada	26.65	Q
6	4	6	Alia Atkinson	Jamaica	26.91	Q
7	3	3	Alys Thomas	Wales	26.95	Q
8	4	3	Erin Gallagher	South Africa	27.05	Q
9	2	6	Helena Gasson	New Zealand	27.10	Q
9	2	5	Harriet Jones	Wales	27.10	Q
11	4	2	Harriet West	Wales	27.41	Q
12	3	6	Quah Ting Wen	Singapore	27.44	Q
13	2	2	Emma Chelius	South Africa	27.55	Q
14	2	3	Charlotte Atkinson	Isle of Man	27.72	Q
15	3	2	Emily Siobhan Muteti	Kenya	28.46	Q
16	4	7	Elodie Poo-cheong	Mauritius	28.63	Q
17	2	7	Katie Kyle	Saint Lucia	28.80	
18	4	8	Gemma Atherley	Jersey	28.94	
19	3	7	Matelita Buadromo	Fiji	29.12	
20	2	8	Lauren Hew	Cayman Islands	29.38	
21	2	1	Cheyenne Rova	Fiji	29.70	
22	3	8	Dilrukshi Perera	Sri Lanka	29.81	NR
23	3	1	Jamila Sanmoogan	Guyana	29.97	
24	1	4	Oreoluwa Cherebin	Grenada	30.43	
25	4	1	Aaliyah Palestrini	Seychelles	30.59	
26	1	3	Christina Linares	Gibraltar	31.92	
27	1	6	Avice Meya	Uganda	32.50	
28	1	5	Miss Khatun	Bangladesh	32.96	
29	1	2	Charissa Panuve	Tonga	33.09	

=== Semifinals ===
The semifinals were held on 7 April at 20:39.

==== Semifinal 1 ====
Rank	Lane	Name	Nationality	Time	Notes
1	4	Cate Campbell	Australia	25.56	Q
2	5	Holly Barratt	Australia	25.88	Q
3	3	Alia Atkinson	Jamaica	26.84	Q
4	6	Erin Gallagher	South Africa	26.85	Q
5	2	Harriet Jones	Wales	27.03	
6	7	Quah Ting Wen	Singapore	27.35	
7	1	Charlotte Atkinson	Isle of Man	27.57	
8	8	Elodie Poo-cheong	Mauritius	28.43	

==== Semifinal 2 ====
Rank	Lane	Name	Nationality	Time	Notes
1	4	Madeline Groves	Australia	25.54	Q
2	5	Penny Oleksiak	Canada	25.94	Q
3	6	Rebecca Smith	Canada	26.68	Q
4	6	Alys Thomas	Wales	26.72	Q
5	7	Harriet West	Wales	27.17	
6	2	Helena Gasson	New Zealand	27.19	
7	1	Alia Atkinson	Jamaica	27.52	
8	8	Emily Siobhan Muteti	Kenya	28.63	

=== Final ===
The final was held on 8 April at 21:36.

Rank	Lane	Name	Nationality	Time	Notes
1st place, gold medalist(s)	5	Cate Campbell	Australia	25.59	
2nd place, silver medalist(s)	3	Holly Barratt	Australia	25.67	
3rd place, bronze medalist(s)	4	Madeline Groves	Australia	25.69	
4	6	Penny Oleksiak	Canada	25.88	
5	2	Rebecca Smith	Canada	26.49	
6	7	Alys Thomas	Wales	26.78	
7	8	Erin Gallagher	South Africa	26.84	
8	1	Alia Atkinson	Jamaica	27.35	
