= Gibraltar at the 2018 Commonwealth Games =

- Flag of Gibraltar
- CG code: GIB
- CGA: Commonwealth Games Association of Gibraltar

in Gold Coast, Australia 4 April 2018 – 15 April 2018
- Competitors: 22 in 7 sports
- Flag bearer: Jonathan Patron (opening)
- Medals: Gold 0 Silver 0 Bronze 0 Total 0

Commonwealth Games appearances (overview)
- 1958; 1962; 1966; 1970; 1974; 1978; 1982; 1986; 1990; 1994; 1998; 2002; 2006; 2010; 2014; 2018; 2022; 2026; 2030

Gibraltar competed at the 2018 Commonwealth Games in the Gold Coast, Australia from April 4 to April 15, 2018. It was Gibraltar's 16th appearance at the Commonwealth Games.

Gibraltar's full team of 22 athletes (18 men and four women) was officially named on January 4, 2018. The team competed in seven sports.

Sport shooter Jonathan Patron was the island's flag bearer during the opening ceremony.

== Competitors ==
The following is the list of number of competitors participating at the Games per sport/discipline.

Sport	Men	Women	Total
Athletics	3	0	3
Cycling	3	0	3
Gymnastics	0	1	1
Shooting	4	2	6
Squash	1	0	1
Swimming	4	1	5
Triathlon	3	0	3
Total	18	4	22

== Athletics ==
Gibraltar participated with 3 athletes (3 men).

Men
Track & road events

Athlete	Event	Heat		Semifinal		Final	
Athlete	Event	Result	Rank	Result	Rank	Result	Rank
Jessy Franco	100 m	11.04	8	Did not advance			
Jerai Torres	200 m	22.23	5	Did not advance			
Jessy Franco	400 m	48.40	7	Did not advance			
Jerai Torres	400 m	49.40	7	Did not advance			
Harvey Dixon	1500 m	3:47.03	6 q	—N/a		3:43.84	11

== Cycling ==
Gibraltar participated with 3 athletes (3 men).

=== Road ===
Men

Athlete	Event	Time	Rank
Derek Barbara	Road race	DNF	
Derek Barbara	Time trial	55:16.02	31
Julian Bellido	Road race	DNF	
Julian Bellido	Time trial	1:01:46.77	47
Joseph Sheriff	Road race	DNF	
Joseph Sheriff	Time trial	DNS	

== Gymnastics ==
=== Rhythmic ===
Gibraltar participated with 1 athlete (1 woman).

Individual Qualification

Athlete	Event	Apparatus				Total	Rank
Athlete	Event	Hoop	Ball	Clubs	Ribbon	Total	Rank
Emma Bosio	Qualification	6.550	5.700	5.650	5.400	23.300	26

== Shooting ==
Gibraltar participated with 6 athletes (4 men and 2 women).

Men

Athlete	Event	Qualification		Final	
Athlete	Event	Points	Rank	Points	Rank
Wayne Piri	50 metre rifle prone	593.7	27	Did not advance	
Jonathan Patron	50 metre pistol	517	13	Did not advance	
Daniel Payas	50 metre pistol	510	15	Did not advance	
Johnathan Patron	10 metre air pistol	542	17	Did not advance	
Daniel Payas	10 metre air pistol	554	14	Did not advance	
Kevin Cowles	Trap	110	17	Did not advance	

Women

Athlete	Event	Qualification		Final	
Athlete	Event	Points	Rank	Points	Rank
Kristina Hewitt	10 metre air rifle	397.8	18	Did not advance	
Mairead Sheriff	10 metre air rifle	397.9	17	Did not advance	

== Squash ==
Gibraltar participated with 1 athlete (1 man).

Individual

Athlete	Event	Round of 64	Round of 32	Round of 16	Quarterfinals	Semifinals	Final	
Athlete	Event	Opposition Score	Opposition Score	Opposition Score	Opposition Score	Opposition Score	Opposition Score	Rank
Christian Navas	Men's singles	Kelvin Ndhlovu (ZAM); L 0–3	Did not advance					

== Swimming ==
Gibraltar participated with 5 athletes (4 men and 1 woman).

Men

Athlete	Event	Heat		Semifinal		Final	
Athlete	Event	Time	Rank	Time	Rank	Time	Rank
Aidan Carrol	200 m freestyle	2:07.82	29	—N/a		Did not advance	
Jordan Gonzalez	50 m backstroke	28.19	14 Q	28.29	14	Did not advance	
Jordan Gonzalez	100 m backstroke	1:01.38	21	Did not advance			
James Sanderson	50 m freestyle	24.72	41	Did not advance			
James Sanderson	100 m freestyle	54.57	44	Did not advance			
James Sanderson	200 m freestyle			—N/a			
James Sanderson	50 m butterfly	26.95	41	Did not advance			
James Sanderson	100 m butterfly	1:02.14	27	Did not advance			
Matt Savitz	50 m butterfly	26.85	39	Did not advance			
Matt Savitz	100 m butterfly	59.56	25	Did not advance			
Matt Savitz	200 m butterfly	2:15.41	14	—N/a		Did not advance	
James Sanderson; Jordan Gonzalez; Matt Savitz; Aidan Carrol	4 × 100 m freestyle relay	DSQ		—N/a		Did not advance	
James Sanderson; Matt Savitz; Jordan Gonzalez; Aidan Carrol	4 × 200 m freestyle relay	—N/a				8:15.75	5
Jordan Gonzalez; James Sanderson; Aidan Carrol; Matt Savitz	4 × 100 m medley relay	4:08.07	9	—N/a		Did not advance	

Women

Athlete	Event	Heat		Semifinal		Final	
Athlete	Event	Time	Rank	Time	Rank	Time	Rank
Christina Linares	50 m freestyle	28.68	31	Did not advance			
Christina Linares	100 m freestyle	1:01.29	28	Did not advance			
Christina Linares	50 m butterfly	31.92	26	Did not advance			

== Triathlon ==
Gibraltar participated with 3 athletes (3 men).

Individual

Athlete	Event	Swim (750 m)	Trans 1	Bike (20 km)	Trans 2	Run (5 km)	Total	Rank
Andrew Gordon	Men's	10:10	0:37	30:51	0:29	18:52	1:00:59	28
Roberto Matto	Men's	11:23	0:47	33:06	0:30	20:01	1:05:47	31
Christopher Walker	Men's	10:33	0:38	31:27	0:30	18:52	1:02:00	29
