= Cycling at the 2018 Commonwealth Games – Women's points race =

Cycling Track – Women's points race at the 2018 Commonwealth Games
- Venue: Anna Meares Velodrome
- Dates: 7 April
- Competitors: 23 from 11 nations
- Winning points: 40

Medalists
gold medal	Elinor Barker	Wales
silver medal	Katie Archibald	Scotland
bronze medal	Neah Evans	Scotland

The women's points race at the 2018 Commonwealth Games, as part of the cycling programme, took place on 7 April 2018.

== Schedule ==
The schedule was as follows:

All times are Australian Eastern Standard Time (UTC+10)

Date	Time	Round
Saturday 7 April 2018	19:16	Final

== Results ==
100 laps (25 km) were raced with 10 sprints.

Rank	Rider	Lap points	Sprint points	Total points
1st place, gold medalist(s)	Elinor Barker (WAL)	20	20	40
2nd place, silver medalist(s)	Katie Archibald (SCO)		20	20
3rd place, bronze medalist(s)	Neah Evans (SCO)		17	17
4	Alexandra Manly (AUS)		14	14
5	Rushlee Buchanan (NZL)		10	10
6	Emily Kay (ENG)		8	8
7	Amy Cure (AUS)		8	8
8	Kinley Gibson (CAN)		5	5
9	Emily Nelson (ENG)		5	5
10	Michaela Drummond (NZL)		4	4
11	Lydia Boylan (NIR)		3	3
12	Jessica Roberts (WAL)		3	3
13	Ellie Dickinson (ENG)		2	2
14	Dani Rowe (WAL)		1	1
15	Amber Joseph (BAR)		0	0
16	Eileen Roe (SCO)		0	0
17	Racquel Sheath (NZL)		0	0
18	Luo Yiwei (SGP)		0	0
19	Stephanie Roorda (CAN)		0	0
20	Ju Pha Som Net (MAS)		0	0
21	Georgia Baker (AUS)		0	0
22	Allison Beveridge (CAN)	–20	0	–20
	Monorama Tongbram (IND)	DNF		
	Sonali Mayanglambam (IND)	DNS		
