= Athletics at the 2018 Commonwealth Games – Men's 400 metres =

Men's 400 metres at the 2018 Commonwealth Games
- Venue: Carrara Stadium
- Dates: 8 April (heats); 9 April (semifinals); 10 April (final)
- Competitors: 45 from 27 nations
- Winning time: 44.35

Medalists
gold medal	Isaac Makwala	Botswana
silver medal	Baboloki Thebe	Botswana
bronze medal	Javon Francis	Jamaica

The men's 400 metres at the 2018 Commonwealth Games, as part of the athletics programme, took place in the Carrara Stadium between 8 and 10 April 2018.

== Records ==
Prior to this competition, the existing world and Games records were as follows:

World record	Wayde van Niekerk (RSA)	43.03	Rio de Janeiro, Brazil	14 August 2016
Games record	Kirani James (GRN)	44.24	Glasgow, Scotland	30 July 2014

== Schedule ==
The schedule was as follows:

Date	Time	Round
Sunday 8 April 2018	15:47	First round
Monday 9 April 2018	19:56	Semifinals
Tuesday 10 April 2018	21:48	Final

All times are Australian Eastern Standard Time (UTC+10)

== Results ==
=== First round ===
The first round consisted of six heats. The three fastest competitors per heat (plus six fastest losers) advanced to the semifinals.

Heat 1

Rank	Lane	Name	Reaction Time	Result	Notes	Qual.
1	7	Machel Cedenio (TTO)	0.213	45.68		Q
2	1	Javon Francis (JAM)	0.167	45.70	SB	Q
3	4	Rabah Yousif (ENG)	0.159	46.09		Q
4	2	Cameron Chalmers (GUE)	0.162	46.16		q
5	8	Royan Marcelle (GRN)	0.154	46.78	PB	q
6	6	Sam Dawkins (JER)	0.187	47.23	PB	
7	3	Thandaza Zwane (SWZ)	0.187	47.45		
8	5	Dalitso Gunde (MAW)	0.179	51.59	PB	

Heat 2

Rank	Lane	Name	Reaction Time	Result	Notes	Qual.
1	4	Isaac Makwala (BOT)	0.206	46.01		Q
2	3	Samson Nathaniel (NGR)	0.170	46.41		Q
3	5	Daniel Mbewe (ZAM)	0.188	46.45		Q
4	7	Collins Omae Gichana (KEN)	0.197	46.57		q
5	8	Marvric Pamphile (LCA)	0.177	48.66		
6	2	Bradly Toa (VAN)	0.192	49.10		
–	6	Khari Herbert (IVB)	0.237	DNF		

Heat 3

Rank	Lane	Name	Reaction Time	Result	Notes	Qual.
1	5	Renny Quow (TTO)	0.167	46.42		Q
2	3	Kimorie Shearman (SVG)	0.170	46.66		Q
3	7	Winston George (GUY)	0.220	46.92		Q
4	2	Orukpe Eraiyokan (NGR)	0.196	47.19		
5	4	Angelo Garland (TCA)	0.145	48.38		
6	6	Bockarie Sesay (SLE)	0.162	49.98		
7	1	Alli Ngaimoko (UGA)	0.163	50.35		
–	8	Matthew Hudson-Smith (ENG)	0.155	DQ	R 163.3a	

Heat 4

Rank	Lane	Name	Reaction Time	Result	Notes	Qual.
1	8	Muhammed Anas Yahiya (IND)	0.151	45.96		Q
2	6	Rusheen McDonald (JAM)	0.182	45.99		Q
3	5	Baboloki Thebe (BOT)	0.171	46.17		Q
4	7	Leonard Opiny (UGA)	0.282	47.32		
5	4	Samuela Railoa (FIJ)	0.163	48.11	PB	
6	3	Lalonde Gordon (TTO)	0.176	49.07		
–	2	Alexander Lerionka Sampao (KEN)		DNS		

Heat 5

Rank	Lane	Name	Reaction Time	Result	Notes	Qual.
1	2	Steven Solomon (AUS)	0.194	45.39		Q
2	7	Dwayne Cowan (ENG)	0.146	45.68		Q
3	6	Demish Gaye (JAM)	0.187	45.70		Q
4	4	Chidi Okezie (NGR)	0.197	45.84	SB	q
5	3	Michael Mathieu (BAH)	0.167	46.97		q
6	8	Derick St Jean (DMA)	0.175	47.27	PB	
7	5	Jerai Torres (GIB)	0.165	49.40		

Heat 6

Rank	Lane	Name	Reaction Time	Result	Notes	Qual.
1	1	Bralon Taplin (GRN)	0.160	45.11		Q
2	6	Karabo Sibanda (BOT)	0.143	46.15		Q
3	4	Boniface Otunga Mweresa (KEN)	0.164	46.32		Q
4	5	Warren Hazel (SKN)	0.141	46.83		q
5	7	Kameli Sauduadua (FIJ)	0.166	47.91	PB	
6	8	Golden Gunde (MAW)	0.196	48.39		
7	2	Jessy Franco (GIB)	0.153	48.40	PB	
–	3	McEbo Mkhaliphi (SWZ)		DNS		

=== Semifinals ===
Three semi-finals were held. The two fastest competitors per semi (plus two fastest losers) advanced to the final.

Semifinal 1

Rank	Lane	Name	Reaction Time	Result	Notes	Qual.
1	6	Isaac Makwala (BOT)	0.205	45.00		Q
2	4	Javon Francis (JAM)	0.162	45.38	SB	Q
3	5	Steven Solomon (AUS)	0.189	45.55		q
4	8	Rabah Yousif (ENG)	0.181	46.05		
5	3	Samson Nathaniel (NGR)	0.172	46.61		
6	7	Daniel Mbewe (ZAM)	0.167	46.77		
7	2	Warren Hazel (SKN)	0.159	47.03		
8	1	Collins Omae Gichana (KEN)	0.169	47.39		

Semifinal 2

Rank	Lane	Name	Reaction Time	Result	Notes	Qual.
1	6	Bralon Taplin (GRN)	0.166	45.44		Q
2	8	Baboloki Thebe (BOT)	0.157	45.54		Q
3	7	Demish Gaye (JAM)	0.168	45.85		q
4	5	Dwayne Cowan (ENG)	0.196	46.06		
5	3	Kimorie Shearman (SVG)	0.168	46.51		
6	4	Renny Quow (TTO)	0.199	47.21		
7	1	Chidi Okezie (NGR)	0.162	47.33		
8	2	Michael Mathieu (BAH)	0.164	47.44		

Semifinal 3

Rank	Lane	Name	Reaction Time	Result	Notes	Qual.
1	6	Muhammed Anas Yahiya (IND)	0.132	45.44		Q
2	5	Rusheen McDonald (JAM)	0.180	45.77		Q
3	4	Machel Cedenio (TTO)	0.250	46.19		
4	3	Karabo Sibanda (BOT)	0.152	46.26		
5	1	Cameron Chalmers (GUE)	0.174	46.34		
6	7	Boniface Ontuga Mweresa (KEN)	0.155	46.68		
7	8	Winston George (GUY)	0.213	47.25		
8	2	Royan Marcelle (GRN)	0.140	48.62		

=== Final ===
The medals were determined in the final.

Rank	Lane	Name	Reaction Time	Result	Notes
1st place, gold medalist(s)	4	Isaac Makwala (BOT)	0.195	44.35	
2nd place, silver medalist(s)	7	Baboloki Thebe (BOT)	0.178	45.09	
3rd place, bronze medalist(s)	3	Javon Francis (JAM)	0.162	45.11	SB
4	6	Muhammed Anas Yahiya (IND)	0.165	45.31	NR
5	5	Bralon Taplin (GRN)	0.163	45.38	
6	1	Demish Gaye (JAM)	0.155	45.56	
7	2	Steven Solomon (AUS)	0.160	45.64	
–	8	Rusheen McDonald (JAM)	0.204	DNF	
