= Rieah Holder =

Barbadian netball player

Personal information
- Born: 15 August 1993 (age 31); Bridgetown
- Height: 1.75 m (5 ft 9 in)
- University: University of the West Indies
- Occupation: netball player

Netball career
- Playing position(s): goal attack, goal shooter

Rieah Holder (born 15 August 1993) is a Barbadian netball player who represents Barbados internationally and plays in the positions of wing attack and centre. She made her maiden World Cup appearance representing Barbados at the 2019 Netball World Cup. She also represented Barbados at the 2018 Commonwealth Games, which also marked her maiden Commonwealth Games appearance.
