= Shooting at the 2018 Commonwealth Games – Men's trap =

Men's trap at the 2018 Commonwealth Games
- Venue: Belmont Shooting Centre, Brisbane
- Dates: 13–14 April
- Competitors: 40 from 24 nations

Medalists
gold medal	Michael Wixey	Wales
silver medal	Aaron Heading	England
bronze medal	Brian Galea	Malta

The Men's trap event at the 2018 Commonwealth Games was held on 13–14 April at the Belmont Shooting Centre, Brisbane.

== Results ==
=== Qualification ===
Each shooter was allowed 125 shots. The top six shooters advanced to the final, with shoot-offs held to break ties if required.

Rank	Name	Day 1			Day 2					Total	Notes
Rank	Name	1	2	ex 50	3	ex 75	4	ex 100	5	Total	Notes
1	Michael Wixey (WAL)	25	21	46	25	71	24	95	25	120	Q
2	Aaron Heading (ENG)	24	24	48	24	72	24	96	23	119; QS-off: +3	Q
3	Edward Ling (ENG)	25	22	47	23	70	25	95	24	119; QS-off: +2	Q
4	Mitchell Iles-Crevatin (AUS)	24	23	47	24	71	23	94	25	119; QS-off: +0	Q
5	Glenn Kable (FIJ)	24	22	46	25	71	24	95	23	118	Q
6	Brian Galea (MLT)	24	24	48	23	71	23	94	23	117; QS-off: +4	Q
7	Kynan Chenai (IND)	23	23	46	24	70	24	94	23	117; QS-off: +3	
8	Manavjit Singh Sandhu (IND)	22	21	43	24	67	24	91	24	115	
9	Christopher Jackson (CAY)	23	22	45	22	67	24	91	24	115	
10	Andreas Makri (CYP)	23	21	44	24	68	23	91	24	115	
11	David Henning (NIR)	24	21	45	23	68	23	91	24	115	
12	Owen Robinson (NZL)	23	22	45	24	69	22	91	24	115	
13	Curtis Wennberg (CAN)	23	20	43	25	68	24	92	23	115	
14	Muhammad Farrukh Nadeem (PAK)	23	21	44	22	66	24	90	23	113	
15	Thomas Grice (AUS)	23	23	46	24	70	19	89	23	112	
16	Daniel Wanma (PNG)	23	22	45	20	65	24	89	22	111	
17	Kevin Cowles (GIB)	22	22	44	20	64	22	86	24	110	
18	Choon Seng Choo (SGP)	19	22	41	22	63	22	85	24	109	
19	Myles Browne-Cole (NZL)	23	19	42	23	65	21	86	23	109	
20	David Walton (IOM)	25	20	45	20	65	22	87	22	109	
21	Stefan Roberts (GGY)	24	21	45	21	66	22	88	20	108	
22	Charles Chen Seong Fook (MAS)	20	18	38	23	61	23	84	23	107	
23	Christian Stephen (FIJ)	21	22	43	22	65	20	85	22	107	
24	Aamer Iqbal (PAK)	21	20	41	19	60	23	83	23	106	
25	Hejun Lin (SGP)	20	21	41	23	64	22	86	20	106	
26	Jonathan Davis (WAL)	21	22	43	21	64	18	82	23	105	
27	Justin St. John (BAR)	21	21	42	19	61	21	82	21	103	
28	Neil Parsons (IOM)	22	21	43	19	62	20	82	21	103	
29	Michael Maskell (BAR)	18	20	38	23	61	19	80	22	102	
30	Darren Burtenshaw (GGY)	23	19	42	22	64	21	85	17	102	
31	Clinton Judd (NFK)	19	15	34	24	58	22	80	20	100	
32	Sigfried Levi (SAM)	19	16	35	22	57	19	76	19	95	
33	Angus Donald (PNG)	19	17	36	20	56	18	74	20	94	
34	Shaun Jaffray (FAI)	22	14	36	20	56	18	74	19	93	
35	Paul Loibl (SAM)	13	18	31	19	50	22	72	20	92	
36	Mitchell Meers (NFK)	18	16	34	17	51	13	64	17	81	
37	Toni Viliamu (NIU)	18	15	33	15	48	15	63	16	79	
38	Tose Talagi (NIU)	19	16	35	14	49	9	58	10	68	
39	Henry Liutai (TGA)	13	13	26	8	34	16	50	13	63	
40	Graham Didlick (FAI)	12	5	17	11	28	16	44	16	60	

=== Final ===
The lowest-ranked shooters were eliminated after 25 / 30 / 35 / 40 shots, with qualification rankings used to break ties if required. The last two shooters were permitted 10 further shots each, plus a shoot-off in the event of a gold-medal tie.

Rank	Name	Series										Notes
Rank	Name	Stage 1 & ex 25	Stage 2	ex 30	Stage 3	ex 35	Stage 4	ex 40	Stage 5	ex 50	Total	Notes
1st place, gold medalist(s)	Michael Wixey (WAL)	23	3	26	5	31	5	36	10	46	46	FGR
2nd place, silver medalist(s)	Aaron Heading (ENG)	23	5	28	3	31	5	36	7	43	43	
3rd place, bronze medalist(s)	Brian Galea (MLT)	21	5	26	5	31	5	36	-	-	36	
4	Edward Ling (ENG)	19	5	24	4	28	-	-	-	-	28	
5	Mitchell Iles-Crevatin (AUS)	18	4	22	-	-	-	-	-	-	22	
6	Glenn Kable (FIJ)	17	-	-	-	-	-	-	-	-	17	
