= Swimming at the 2018 Commonwealth Games – Men's 200 metre freestyle =

Men's 200 metre freestyle at the 2018 Commonwealth Games
- Venue: Gold Coast Aquatic Centre
- Dates: 6 April
- Competitors: 30 from 19 nations
- Winning time: 1:45.56

Medalists
gold medal	Kyle Chalmers	Australia
silver medal	Mack Horton	Australia
bronze medal	Duncan Scott	Scotland

The men's 200 metre freestyle event at the 2018 Commonwealth Games was held on 6 April at the Gold Coast Aquatic Centre.

== Records ==
Prior to this competition, the existing world, Commonwealth and Games records were as follows:

World record	Paul Biedermann (GER)	1:42.00	Rome, Italy	28 July 2009
Commonwealth record	Ian Thorpe (AUS)	1:44.06	Fukuoka, Japan	25 July 2001
Games record	Ian Thorpe (AUS)	1:44.71	Manchester, United Kingdom	31 July 2002

== Schedule ==
The schedule is as follows:

All times are Australian Eastern Standard Time (UTC+10)

Date	Time	Round
Thursday 6 April 2018	10:31	Qualifying
Thursday 6 April 2018	19:56	Final

== Results ==
=== Heats ===
Rank	Heat	Lane	Name	Nationality	Time	Notes
1	4	4	Duncan Scott	Scotland	1:46.62	Q
2	3	4	James Guy	England	1:47.04	Q
3	4	3	Calum Jarvis	Wales	1:47.08	Q
4	2	4	Kyle Chalmers	Australia	1:47.10	Q
5	4	5	Alexander Graham	Australia	1:47.35	Q
6	2	6	Chad le Clos	South Africa	1:47.37	Q
7	3	5	Mack Horton	Australia	1:47.89	Q
8	2	5	Stephen Milne	Scotland	1:48.08	Q
9	4	6	Jordan Sloan	Northern Ireland	1:48.16	
10	3	7	Craig McLean	Scotland	1:48.42	
11	3	3	Nicholas Grainger	England	1:48.72	
12	3	6	Matthew Stanley	New Zealand	1:48.75	
13	3	2	Cameron Kurle	England	1:48.96	
14	2	2	Carson Olafson	Canada	1:49.14	
15	2	7	Wesley Roberts	Cook Islands	1:49.35	
16	2	3	Welson Sim	Malaysia	1:49.58	
17	4	2	Jeremy Bagshaw	Canada	1:49.60	
18	4	1	Eben Vorster	South Africa	1:50.78	
19	4	7	Samuel Belanger	Canada	1:51.69	
20	3	1	Alex Sobers	Barbados	1:51.87	
21	2	8	James Brown	Northern Ireland	1:53.23	
22	2	1	Mathieu Marquet	Mauritius	1:53.27	
23	3	8	Samuel Seghers	Papua New Guinea	1:56.68	
24	4	8	Constantinos Hadjittooulis	Cyprus	1:58.36	
25	1	3	Gregory Anodin	Mauritius	1:58.92	
26	1	5	Erico Cuna	Mozambique	1:59.43	
27	1	6	Dean Hoffman	Seychelles	1:59.54	
28	1	4	Stefano Mitchell	Antigua and Barbuda	2:00.46	
29	1	7	Aidan Carrol	Gibraltar	2:07.82	
30	1	2	Cruz Halbich	Saint Vincent and the Grenadines	2:09.61	

=== Final ===
Rank	Lane	Name	Nationality	Time	Notes
1st place, gold medalist(s)	6	Kyle Chalmers	Australia	1:45.56	
2nd place, silver medalist(s)	1	Mack Horton	Australia	1:45.89	
3rd place, bronze medalist(s)	4	Duncan Scott	Scotland	1:46.30	
4	5	James Guy	England	1:46.40	
5	3	Calum Jarvis	Wales	1:46.53	
6	2	Alexander Graham	Australia	1:47.01	
7	7	Chad le Clos	South Africa	1:47.46	
8	8	Stephen Milne	Scotland	1:48.52	
