= Shooting at the 2018 Commonwealth Games – Men's 50 metre rifle prone =

Men's 50 metre rifle prone at the 2018 Commonwealth Games
- Venue: Belmont Shooting Centre, Brisbane
- Dates: 10 April
- Competitors: 32 from 21 nations

Medalists
gold medal	David Phelps	Wales
silver medal	Neil Stirton	Scotland
bronze medal	Kenneth Parr	England

The Men's 50 metre rifle prone event at the 2018 Commonwealth Games was held on 10 April at the Belmont Shooting Centre, Brisbane.

== Results ==
=== Qualification ===
Each shooter fired at the target 60 times. The top eight shooters advanced to the final.

Rank	Name	1	2	1-2	3	1-3	4	1-4	5	1-5	6	Total	Notes
1	James Daly (AUS)	104.3	104.0	208.3	103.1	311.4	102.3	413.7	103.6	517.3	103.2	620.5	Q
2	Ryan Taylor (NZL)	103.8	103.6	207.4	103.5	310.9	102.0	412.9	103.6	516.5	102.9	619.4	Q
3	Gagan Narang (IND)	102.5	104.8	207.3	102.3	309.6	103.2	412.8	103.4	516.2	100.8	617.0	Q
4	Neil Stirton (SCO)	103.0	102.6	205.6	104.7	310.3	101.6	411.9	101.5	513.4	103.5	616.9	Q
5	Leonard Thomson (SCO)	100.9	102.2	203.1	102.6	305.7	102.4	408.1	103.8	511.9	102.7	614.6	Q
6	Chain Singh (IND)	104.3	104.2	208.5	103.1	311.6	100.9	412.5	102.3	514.8	99.4	614.2	Q
7	David Phelps (WAL)	105.0	102.5	207.5	101.5	309.0	102.0	411.0	101.2	512.2	101.5	613.7	Q
8	Kenneth Parr (ENG)	101.3	101.6	202.9	103.6	306.5	102.5	409.0	102.3	511.3	101.4	612.7	Q
9	Gulraaj Sehmi (KEN)	103.7	102.4	206.1	101.2	307.3	101.5	408.8	103.0	511.8	100.4	612.2	
10	David Binney (ENG)	102.5	103.7	206.2	101.9	308.1	100.7	408.8	103.0	511.8	98.5	610.3	
11	Muhammad Ezuan (MAS)	102.3	103.4	205.7	103.4	309.1	101.2	410.3	100.2	510.5	99.1	609.6	
12	Dane Sampson (AUS)	102.0	102.1	204.1	101.6	305.7	101.0	406.7	100.2	506.9	101.9	608.8	
13	Grzegorz Sych (CAN)	104.2	100.8	205.0	102.2	307.2	98.7	405.9	102.2	508.1	99.9	608.0	
14	Stuart Hill (NIR)	98.3	104.0	202.3	100.2	302.5	100.7	403.2	102.4	505.6	102.1	607.7	
15	Zhong Xian Lim (SGP)	102.4	103.5	205.9	100.2	306.1	100.6	406.7	101.5	508.2	97.8	606.0	
16	Cameron Pirouet (JEY)	102.4	102.3	204.7	100.7	305.4	98.8	404.2	100.9	505.1	100.7	605.8	
17	Wen Yi Abel Lim (SGP)	101.7	102.2	203.9	102.6	306.5	101.2	407.7	97.6	505.3	99.8	605.1	
18	Michael Bamsey (WAL)	100.0	99.5	199.5	100.5	300.0	102.4	402.4	101.2	503.6	101.2	604.8	
19	Rory Hamilton (NIR)	102.8	100.7	203.5	101.1	304.6	100.1	404.7	99.9	504.6	100.2	604.8	
20	Mohammad Chowdhury (BAN)	102.7	103.3	206.0	98.4	304.4	100.1	404.5	99.4	503.9	100.6	604.5	
21	Simon Henry (SHN)	101.2	97.9	199.1	103.5	302.6	100.9	403.5	100.4	503.9	99.5	603.4	
22	Andrew Chapman (JEY)	98.7	101.2	199.9	101.5	301.4	99.3	400.7	101.7	502.4	100.8	603.2	
23	Ghufran Adil (PAK)	100.4	98.8	199.2	102.7	301.9	99.0	400.9	101.5	502.4	99.9	602.3	
24	Matthew Guille (GGY)	102.8	100.0	202.8	102.7	305.5	100.9	406.4	97.2	503.6	98.1	601.7	
25	Marlon Moses (TTO)	98.4	101.3	199.7	101.4	301.1	101.0	402.1	102.5	504.6	96.7	601.3	
26	Gurupreet Dhanjal (KEN)	97.1	102.4	199.5	102.3	301.8	100.1	401.9	101.3	503.2	97.4	600.6	
27	Wayne Piri (GIB)	101.8	99.7	201.5	100.2	301.7	98.0	399.7	97.6	497.3	96.4	593.7	
28	Carlos Yon (SHN)	98.5	95.8	194.3	99.5	293.8	98.7	392.5	95.2	487.7	96.9	584.6	
29	Louis Estwick (BAR)	99.3	97.3	196.6	97.1	293.7	94.4	388.1	96.0	484.1	93.7	577.8	
30	Emmanuel Koli Appiah (GHA)	92.0	95.6	187.6	99.7	287.3	90.9	378.2	95.9	474.1	97.0	571.1	
–	Abdullah Hel Baki (BAN)	—										DNS	
–	Michael Goss (FAI)	—										DNS	

=== Final ===
In the first competition stage, each shooter fired at the target 10 times. Their aggregate scores were carried over to the second competition stage, in which the lowest-ranked shooter was eliminated for every two shots taken.

Rank	Name	1st Stage			2nd Stage (Elimination)														Total	Notes
Rank	Name	1	2	1-2	3	1-3	4	1-4	5	1-5	6	1-6	7	1-7	8	1-8	9	1-9	Total	Notes
1st place, gold medalist(s)	David Phelps (WAL)	51.3	52.6	103.9	21.2	125.1	19.6	144.7	20.8	165.5	20.6	186.1	21.1	207.2	21.2	228.4	20.4	248.8	248.8	FGR
2nd place, silver medalist(s)	Neil Stirton (SCO)	52.3	51.7	104.0	19.1	123.1	20.9	144.0	21.5	165.5	20.5	186.0	20.7	206.7	20.3	227.0	20.7	247.7	247.7	
3rd place, bronze medalist(s)	Kenneth Parr (ENG)	51.3	51.7	103.0	20.4	123.4	21.4	144.8	20.5	165.3	20.5	185.8	19.7	205.5	21.1	226.6	-	-	226.6	
4	Chain Singh (IND)	51.3	51.7	103.0	20.6	123.6	21.2	144.8	19.8	164.6	20.9	185.5	19.3	204.8	-	-	-	-	204.8	
5	Ryan Taylor (NZL)	50.6	52.4	103.0	20.5	123.5	20.1	143.6	20.4	164.0	20.1	184.1	-	-	-	-	-	-	184.1	
6	James Daly (AUS)	51.5	52.2	103.7	19.8	123.5	19.7	143.2	20.0	163.2	-	-	-	-	-	-	-	-	163.2	
7	Gagan Narang (IND)	51.5	50.5	102.0	20.1	122.1	20.2	142.3	-	-	-	-	-	-	-	-	-	-	142.3	
8	Leonard Thomson (SCO)	51.2	49.1	100.3	20.9	121.2	-	-	-	-	-	-	-	-	-	-	-	-	121.2	
