= Sanjay Singh (squash player) =

Malaysian squash player (born 1994)

Personal information
- Born: 23 April 1994 (age 32) Miri, Sarawak, Malaysia
- Height: 1.79 m (5 ft 10 in)
- Weight: 67 kg (148 lb)

Sport
- Country: Malaysia
- Turned pro: 2012
- Retired: Active
- Racquet used: Dunlop

Men's singles
- Highest ranking: No. 110 (September, 2015)
- Current ranking: No. 136 (July, 2016)
- Updated on August, 2017

Sanjay Singh (Punjabi: ਸੰਜੇ ਸਿੰਘ, romanized: Sajē sigha; born 23 April 1994) is a professional squash player who represented Malaysia. He reached a career-high world ranking of World No. 115 in September 2015.

== Personal life ==
Singh currently juggling between training and his studies for a business diploma at University Malaya.
