= Ransford Goodluck =

British sport shooter (born 1976)

Personal information
- Full name: Ransford Roxroy Goodluck
- Born: 24 January 1953 Georgetown, Guyana
- Died: 1 August 2024 (aged 71)
- Occupation: Armourer
- Years active: 45

Sport
- Country: Guyana
- Sport: Sport shooter
- Event: Fullbore Target Rifle

Ransford Roxroy Goodluck (24 January 1953 – 1 August 2024) was a Guyanese sport shooter who represented Guyana at six Commonwealth Games and was West Indies champion ten times. When the Great Britain Shooting Team visited Guyana on the first leg of their 1996 Caribbean Tour, Ransford captained the Guyanan team to a noted victory becoming the first Caribbean team to ever beat Great Britain. He has been credited with transforming Guyanan target sports since the 1980s and driving up standards of competition. He was named Guyana National Sportsman of the Year 2005.

== Personal life ==
Goodluck was born on 24 January 1953 in Queenstown, Georgetown, Guyana, as one of eight children to parents Isaac and Elaine Goodluck. His father was an armourer of the British Guiana Police Force. He joined the Guyana Police Force in 1973, eventually becoming the force armourer. He retired with the rank of Chief Inspector.

Having been National Sportsman of the Year runner-up in 1995, 1998 and 2004, he became Sportsman of the Year in 2005. At his death on 1 August 2024, he was survived by his wife Omida, and ten children. Goodluck was hailed as a sporting icon of Guyana in obituaries.

== Sport shooting career ==
Goodluck joined the Guyana National Rifle Association (GNRA) in 1979 after joining the Police force, where he had scored well in firearms training. He was selected to the Guyana team for the 1979 Caribbean Championships which Guyana were hosting. Goodluck won the Young Cup and the GNRA's Junior Annual Prize Meeting.

In 1985 he was selected to the first West Indies team to travel to the Imperial Meeting at Bisley Camp in Great Britain, where he competed in the Kolapore Team Match. He went on to represent the West Indies in the Kolapore and MacKinnon Matches again in 2000 and 2003. In 1994 he was elected GNRA Captain and started the process of modernising the team ahead of Guyana hosting the Caribbean Championships in 1995, specifically working to overcome poor performance at the longer ranges of 900 and 1000 yards. The team became Caribbean Champions, and went on to beat Great Britain on their 1996 Caribbean Tour, with Goodluck being the top individual scorer, knocking Andrew Tucker into second place.

He first represented Guyana at Commonwealth Games level in 1994, and would go on to shoot at every Games up to the 2018 Gold Coast Games, except at the 2014 Glasgow Games when he travelled as team manager. He was appointed flagbearer for Guyana at the opening ceremony of the 2006 Melbourne Games. At the 2010 Delhi Games, Goodluck placed fifth in the fullbore pairs match with Mahendra Persaud, which was Guyana's best ever finish in that event.

At the 2010 Imperial Meeting in Britain he was a member of the West Indies team who won the Junior Overseas Cup and Junior Kolapore. He was the Caribbean overall Fullbore Champion on multiple occasions (1995, 1998, 2000, 2004, 2008, 2010, 2018), and Guyana National Fullbore Champion on many more - trading places with Lennox Braithwaite.
