= Dakeil Thorpe =

Barbadian badminton player (born 1989)

Personal information
- Born: Dakeil Jonathan Thorpe; 12 September 1989 (age 37) Bridgetown, Barbados
- Height: 1.70 m (5 ft 7 in)
- Weight: 74 kg (163 lb)

Sport
- Country: Barbados
- Sport: Badminton

Men's singles & doubles
- Highest ranking: 351 (MS 30 August 2018); 187 (MD 5 July 2018); 219 (XD 12 February 2019)
- BWF profile

Dakeil Jonathan Thorpe (born 12 September 1989) is a Barbadian badminton player. Thorpe competed at the 2010, 2014, and 2018 Commonwealth Games. He also represented his country at the 2015 and 2019 Pan American Games. He was the men's doubles champion at the 2018 Carebaco International with Shae Michael Martin and at the 2016 Suriname International tournament partnered with Cory Fanus. Thorpe also won the mixed doubles event at the 2016 Carebaco International with Tamisha Williams.

== Achievements ==
=== BWF International Challenge/Series ===
Men's doubles
Year	Tournament	Partner	Opponent	Score	Result
2016	Suriname International	(Barbados) Cory Fanus	(Suriname) Alrick Toney (Suriname) Mitchel Wongsodikromo	21–16, 21–12	(gold) Winner
2018	Carebaco International	(Barbados) Shae Michael Martin	(Suriname) Dylan Darmohoetomo (Suriname) Gilmar Jones	21–19, 18-21, 21–16	(gold) Winner

Mixed doubles
Year	Tournament	Partner	Opponent	Score	Result
2016	Carebaco International	(Barbados) Tamisha Williams	(Dominican Republic) Nelson Javier (Dominican Republic) Noemi Almonte	21–10, 21–18	(gold) Winner
2018	Carebaco International	(Barbados) Tamisha Williams	(Suriname) Dylan Darmohoetomo (Suriname) Crystal Leefmans	20–22, 21–18, 19–21	(silver) Runner-up

BWF International Challenge tournament
BWF International Series tournament
BWF Future Series tournament
