= Cory Fanus =

Barbadian badminton player (born 1996)

Personal information
- Born: Cory Elius Fanus; 13 March 1996 (age 30) Bridgetown, Barbados
- Height: 1.68 m (5 ft 6 in)
- Weight: 72 kg (159 lb)

Sport
- Country: Barbados
- Sport: Badminton

Men's singles & doubles
- Highest ranking: 345 (MS 27 April 2017); 190 (MD 29 March 2018); 477 (XD 5 April 2018)
- BWF profile

Cory Elius Fanus (born 13 March 1996) is a Barbadian badminton player. He was the men's doubles champion at the 2016 Suriname International tournament partnered with Dakeil Thorpe. Fanus represented his country at the 2018 Commonwealth Games in Gold Coast.

== Achievements ==
=== BWF International Challenge/Series ===
Men's doubles
Year	Tournament	Partner	Opponent	Score	Result
2016	Suriname International	(Barbados) Dakeil Thorpe	(Suriname) Alrick Toney (Suriname) Mitchel Wongsodikromo	21–16, 21–12	(gold) Winner

BWF International Challenge tournament
BWF International Series tournament
BWF Future Series tournament
