= Jersey at the 2018 Commonwealth Games =

- Flag of Jersey
- CGF code: JEY
- CGA: Commonwealth Games Association of Jersey
- Website: cgaj.org

in Gold Coast, Australia 4 April 2018 – 15 April 2018
- Competitors: 33 in 8 sports
- Flag bearer: Daniel Halksworth (opening)
- Medals: Gold 0 Silver 0 Bronze 0 Total 0

Commonwealth Games appearances (overview)
- 1958; 1962; 1966; 1970; 1974; 1978; 1982; 1986; 1990; 1994; 1998; 2002; 2006; 2010; 2014; 2018; 2022; 2026; 2030

Jersey competed at the 2018 Commonwealth Games in the Gold Coast, Australia from April 4 to April 15, 2018.

The team from Jersey consisted of 33 athletes competing in eight sports.

Cyclist Daniel Halksworth was the country's flag bearer during the opening ceremony.

== Competitors ==
The following is the list of number of competitors participating at the Games per sport/discipline.

Sport	Men	Women	Total
Athletics	3	0	3
Badminton	2	2	4
Cycling	4	2	6
Gymnastics	1	2	3
Lawn bowls	3	5	8
Shooting	4	2	6
Swimming	1	1	2
Triathlon	1	0	1
Total	19	14	33

== Athletics ==
Jersey participated with 3 athletes (3 men).

Men
Track & road events

Athlete	Event	Heat		Semifinal		Final	
Athlete	Event	Result	Rank	Result	Rank	Result	Rank
Sam Dawkins	200 m	21.91	7	Did not advance			
Sam Dawkins	400 m	47.23	6	Did not advance			
Elliot Dorey	800 m	1:52.60	8	—		Did not advance	
Elliot Dorey	1500 m	3:52.75	9	—		Did not advance	

Field events

Athlete	Event	Qualification		Final	
Athlete	Event	Distance	Rank	Distance	Rank
Zane Duquemin	Discus throw	57.66	9 q	55.64	9

== Badminton ==
Jersey participated with four athletes (two men and two women)

Singles

Athlete	Event	Round of 64	Round of 32	Round of 16	Quarterfinal	Semifinal	Final / BM	
Athlete	Event	Opposition Score	Opposition Score	Opposition Score	Opposition Score	Opposition Score	Opposition Score	Rank
Alexander Hutchings	Men's singles	Kalombo Mulenga (ZAM); L 0 - 2	Did not advance					
Elise Dixon	Women's singles	bye	Chloe Birch (ENG); L 0 - 2	Did not advance				
Emily Temple Redshaw	Women's singles	Hasini Ambalangodage (SRI); L 0 - 2	Did not advance					

Doubles

Athlete	Event	Round of 64	Round of 32	Round of 16	Quarterfinal	Semifinal	Final / BM	
Athlete	Event	Opposition Score	Opposition Score	Opposition Score	Opposition Score	Opposition Score	Opposition Score	Rank
Matthew Bignell; Alexander Hutchings	Men's doubles	—	Ekiring (UGA); Kasirye (UGA); W 2 - 0	Dias (SRI); Goonethilleka (SRI); L 0 - 2	Did not advance			
Elise Dixon; Emily Temple Redshaw	Women's doubles	—	Chambers (NIR); Darragh (NIR); L 0 - 2	Did not advance				
Elise Dixon; Alexander Hutching	Mixed doubles	Bye	Dias (SRI); Hendahewa (SRI); L 0 - 2	Did not advance				
Emily Temple Redshaw; Matthew Bignell	Mixed doubles	Wong (SGP); Ong (SGP); L 0 - 2	Did not advance					

== Cycling ==
Jersey participated with 6 athletes (4 men and 2 women).

=== Road ===
Men

Athlete	Event	Time	Rank
Daniel Halksworth	Road race	4:06:26	45
Rhys Hidrio	Road race	DNF	
Oliver Lowthorpe	Road race	DNF	
Jack Rebours	Road race	DNF	
Daniel Halksworth	Time trial	54:12.48	26
Jack Rebours	Time trial	53:45.80	23

Women

Athlete	Event	Time	Rank
Kimberley Ashton	Road race	3:03:32	20
Kimberley Ashton	Time trial	41:26.07	15
Helen Ralston	Road race	3:12:48	31
Helen Ralston	Time trial	43:01.12	18

=== Mountain bike ===
Athlete	Event	Time	Rank
Rhys Hidrio	Men's cross-country	1:27:42	14
Oliver Lowthorpe	Men's cross-country	-3LAP	20

== Gymnastics ==
=== Artistic ===
Jersey participated with 3 athletes (1 man and 2 woman).

Men
Individual Qualification

Athlete	Event	Apparatus						Total	Rank
Athlete	Event	F	PH	R	V	PB	HB	Total	Rank
Daniel Lee	Qualification	12.650	10.850	12.750	13.750	12.750	12.700	75.450	19 Q

Individual Finals

Athlete	Event	Apparatus						Total	Rank
Athlete	Event	F	PH	R	V	PB	HB	Total	Rank
Daniel Lee	All-around	13.050	12.000	12.800	13.750	12.600	13.050	77.250	12

Women
Individual Qualification

Athlete	Event	Apparatus				Total	Rank
Athlete	Event	V	UB	BB	F	Total	Rank
Rachelle Flambard	Qualification	12.150	8.850	9.650	11.100	41.750	25 R
Bonita Shurmer	Qualification	12.100	10.450	11.200	10.400	44.150	20 Q

Individual Finals

Athlete	Event	Apparatus				Total	Rank
Athlete	Event	V	UB	BB	F	Total	Rank
Rachelle Flambard	All-around	11.500	9.400	10.900	10.650	42.450	18
Bonita Shurmer	All-around	11.950	10.000	10.850	10.750	43.550	17

== Lawn bowls ==
Jersey is scheduled to compete in the lawn bowls competition.

Men

Athlete	Event	Group stage						Quarterfinal	Semifinal	Final / BM	
Athlete	Event	Opposition Score	Opposition Score	Opposition Score	Opposition Score	Opposition Score	Rank	Opposition Score	Opposition Score	Opposition Score	Rank
Malcolm De Sousa	Singles	Gaborutwe (BOT); W 21 - 6	Gary Kelly (NIR); L 20 - 21	McGreal (IOM); W 21 - 8	Bester (CAN); L 20 - 21	Bazo (PNG); W 21 - 16	4	Did not advance			
Derek Boswell; Ross Davis; Malcolm De Sousa	Triples	Australia; W 21 - 18	Botswana; W 27 - 4	Fiji; W 20 - 10	Brunei; D 11 - 11	—	1 Q	Canada; L 7 - 17	Did not advance		

Women

Athlete	Event	Group stage					Quarterfinal	Semifinal	Final / BM	
Athlete	Event	Opposition Score	Opposition Score	Opposition Score	Opposition Score	Rank	Opposition Score	Opposition Score	Opposition Score	Rank
Rachel MacDonald	Singles	Brown (SCO); L 13 - 21	MacDonald (GUE); L 12 - 21	Matali (BRU); L 14 - 21	Daniels (WAL); L 11 - 21	5	Did not advance			
Christine Grimes; Rachel MacDonald	Pairs	South Africa; L 6 - 23	India; L 12 - 22	Wales; L 14 - 22	Northern Ireland; L 8 - 27	5	Did not advance			
Doreen Moon; Joan Renouf; Eileen Vowden	Triples	Wales; L 7 - 18	Zambia; W 26 - 12	Namibia; W 15 - 12	New Zealand; L 8 - 24	3	Did not advance			
Christine Grimes; Doreen Moon; Joan Renouf; Eileen Vowden	Fours	New Zealand; L 15 - 20	Zambia; L 9 - 22	Norfolk Island; L 13 - 21	South Africa; L 7 - 19	5	Did not advance			

== Shooting ==
Jersey participated with 6 athletes (4 men and 2 women).

Men

Athlete	Event	Qualification		Final	
Athlete	Event	Points	Rank	Points	Rank
Andrew Chapman	50 metre rifle prone	603.2	22	Did not advance	
Cameron Pirouet	50 metre rifle 3 positions	1149	6 Q	428.8	4
Cameron Pirouet	50 metre rifle prone	605.8	16	Did not advance	
Cameron Pirouet	10 metre air rifle	608.9	13	Did not advance	

Women

Athlete	Event	Qualification		Final	
Athlete	Event	Points	Rank	Points	Rank
Sarah Campion	50 metre rifle prone	—		603.5	15
Nicola Holmes	25 metre pistol	544	13	Did not advance	
Nicola Holmes	10 metre air pistol	361	14	Did not advance	

Open

Athlete	Event	Day 1		Day 2		Day 3		Total	
Athlete	Event	Points	Rank	Points	Rank	Points	Rank	Overall	Rank
Barry Le Cheminant	Queen's prize individual	105-12v	6	149-20v	6	147-18v	9	401-50v	5
David Le Quesne	Queen's prize individual	103-10v	17	149-21v	5	148-16v	3	400-47v	6
Barry Le Cheminant; David Le Quesne	Queen's prize pairs	297-23v	7	275-13v	10	—		572-36v	10

== Swimming ==
Jersey participated with 2 athletes (1 man and 1 woman).

Men

Athlete	Event	Heat		Semifinal		Final	
Athlete	Event	Time	Rank	Time	Rank	Time	Rank
Harry Shalamon	50 m freestyle	24.01	30	Did not advance			
Harry Shalamon	50 m backstroke	26.08	7 Q	25.52	4 Q	25.73	6
Harry Shalamon	100 m backstroke	56.41	13 Q	56.47	12	Did not advance	
Harry Shalamon	200 m backstroke	2:06.29	19	—		Did not advance	
Harry Shalamon	100 m butterfly	56.24	19	Did not advance			

Women

Athlete	Event	Heat		Semifinal		Final	
Athlete	Event	Time	Rank	Time	Rank	Time	Rank
Gemma Atherley	100 m freestyle	58.42	18	Did not advance			
Gemma Atherley	200 m freestyle	2:03.64	13	—		Did not advance	
Gemma Atherley	400 m freestyle	4:22.55	16	—		Did not advance	
Gemma Atherley	50 m backstroke	30.91	23	Did not advance			
Gemma Atherley	100 m backstroke	1:04.75	18	Did not advance			
Gemma Atherley	200 m backstroke	2:16.89	12	—		Did not advance	
Gemma Atherley	50 m butterfly	28.94	18	Did not advance			

== Triathlon ==
Jersey participated with 1 athlete (1 man).

Individual

Athlete	Event	Swim (750 m)	Trans 1	Bike (20 km)	Trans 2	Run (5 km)	Total	Rank
Oliver Turner	Men's	9:20	0:36	31:02	0:28	18:40	1:00:06	26
