= Brunei at the 2018 Commonwealth Games =

- Flag of Brunei
- CGF code: BRU
- CGA: Brunei Darussalam National Olympic Council
- Website: bruneiolympic.org

in Gold Coast, Australia 4 April 2018 – 15 April 2018
- Competitors: 8 in 1 sport
- Medals: Gold 0 Silver 0 Bronze 0 Total 0

Commonwealth Games appearances (overview)
- 1990; 1994; 1998; 2002; 2006; 2010; 2014; 2018; 2022; 2026; 2030

Brunei competed at the 2018 Commonwealth Games in the Gold Coast, Australia from April 4 to April 15, 2018. It was Brunei's 8th appearance at the Commonwealth Games.

The Brunei team consisted of 8 athletes (5 men and 3 women) that competed in 1 sport: lawn bowls.

== Competitors ==
The following is the list of number of competitors participating at the Games per sport/discipline.

Sport	Men	Women	Total
Lawn bowls	5	3	8
Total	5	3	8

== Lawn bowls ==
Brunei is scheduled to compete in the lawn bowls competition with 8 athletes (5 men and 3 women).

Men

Athlete	Event	Group Stage						Quarterfinal	Semifinal	Final / BM	
Athlete	Event	Opposition Score	Opposition Score	Opposition Score	Opposition Score	Opposition Score	Rank	Opposition Score	Opposition Score	Opposition Score	Rank
Abd Rahman Omar	Singles	Omar (NIU); W 21 - 14	Rusli (MAS); L 13 - 21	Bell (SAM); W 21 - 12	Burnett (SCO); L 8 - 21	Priaulx (GUE); L 20 - 21	4	did not advance			
Ampuan Ampuan Kasim; Pg Hj Tengah Pg Hj Tajudin	Pairs	Canada; L 11–15	Malta; L 11–28	Australia; L 7–30	Guernsey; L 12–20	—	5	did not advance			
Abd Rahman Omar; Haji Brahim; Mohd Israt Haji Abd Ghani	Triples	Botswana; L 16–17	Fiji; L 11–14	Jersey; D 11–11	Australia; L 4–29	—	5	did not advance			
Ampuan Ampuan Kasim; Haji Brahim; Mohd Israt Haji Abd Ghani; Pg Hj Tengah Pg Hj Tajudin	Fours	Scotland; L 9 - 25	England; L 4 - 18	Singapore; W 11 - 9	—		3	did not advance			

Women

Athlete	Event	Group Stage					Quarterfinal	Semifinal	Final / BM	
Athlete	Event	Opposition Score	Opposition Score	Opposition Score	Opposition Score	Rank	Opposition Score	Opposition Score	Opposition Score	Rank
Amaliah Matali	Singles	Daniels (WAL); L 10–21	MacDonald (JER); W 21–14	Brown (SCO); L 12–21	Beere (GUE); W 21–17	3	did not advance			
Hajah Muntol; Suhana Md Daud	Pairs	Malaysia; L 10 - 28	Botswana; W 19 - 17	Scotland; L 9 - 32	Cook Islands; W 26 - 8	3	did not advance			

== See also ==
- Brunei at the 2018 Asian Games
- Brunei at the 2018 Summer Youth Olympics
