= Scotland at the 2018 Commonwealth Games =

- Flag of Scotland
- CG code: SCO
- CGA: Commonwealth Games Scotland
- Website: goscotland.org

in Gold Coast, Australia 4 April 2018 – 15 April 2018
- Competitors: 226 in 18 sports
- Flag bearers: Opening: Eilidh Doyle; Closing: Duncan Scott
- Medals Ranked 8th: Gold 9 Silver 13 Bronze 22 Total 44

Commonwealth Games appearances (overview)
- 1930; 1934; 1938; 1950; 1954; 1958; 1962; 1966; 1970; 1974; 1978; 1982; 1986; 1990; 1994; 1998; 2002; 2006; 2010; 2014; 2018; 2022; 2026; 2030

Scotland competed at the 2018 Commonwealth Games in Gold Coast, Australia from 4 April to 15 April 2018. It was Scotland's 21st appearance at the Commonwealth Games, having competed at every Games since their inception in 1930.

Track and field athlete Eilidh Doyle was the country's flag bearer during the opening ceremony.

== Competitors ==
The following is the list of number of competitors participating at the Games per sport/discipline.

Sport	Men	Women	Total
Athletics	9	13 (Note: Beth Potter has been selected to compete in both athletics and triathlon. For this reason she has not been included in the total for the athletics component of the Scotland team.)	22
Badminton	5	3	8
Basketball	12	0	12
Beach volleyball	2	2	4
Boxing	9	2	11
Cycling	10	7	17
Diving	2	2	4
Gymnastics	5	5	10
Hockey	18	18	36
Lawn bowls	10	7	17
Netball	—N/a	12	12
Rugby sevens	13	0	13
Shooting	7	6	13
Squash	3	2	5
Swimming	15	10	25
Table tennis	3	0	3
Triathlon	2	3	5
Weightlifting	3	2	5
Wrestling	4	0	4
Total	132	94	226

== Medallists ==
Medal	Name	Sport	Event	Date
1st place, gold medalist(s)	Neil Fachie; Matt Rotherham (pilot)	Cycling	Men's tandem kilo B	5 April 2018
1st place, gold medalist(s)	Katie Archibald	Cycling	Women's individual pursuit	6 April 2018
1st place, gold medalist(s)	Neil Fachie; Matt Rotherham (pilot)	Cycling	Men's tandem sprint B	7 April 2018
1st place, gold medalist(s)	Darren Burnett; Ronald Duncan; Derek Oliver	Lawn bowls	Men's triples	8 April 2018
1st place, gold medalist(s)	Duncan Scott	Swimming	Men's 100 metre freestyle	8 April 2018
1st place, gold medalist(s)	Mark Stewart	Cycling	Men's points race	8 April 2018
1st place, gold medalist(s)	David McMath	Shooting	Men's double trap	11 April 2018
1st place, gold medalist(s)	Grace Reid	Diving	Women's 1 metre springboard	13 April 2018
1st place, gold medalist(s)	Alex Marshall; Paul Foster; Derek Oliver; Ronnie Duncan	Lawn bowls	Men's fours	13 April 2018
2nd place, silver medalist(s)	Ross Murdoch	Swimming	Men's 200 metre breaststroke	5 April 2018
2nd place, silver medalist(s)	Hannah Miley	Swimming	Women's 400 metre individual medley	5 April 2018
2nd place, silver medalist(s)	John Archibald	Cycling	Men's individual pursuit	6 April 2018
2nd place, silver medalist(s)	Mark Szaranek	Swimming	Men's 400 metre individual medley	6 April 2018
2nd place, silver medalist(s)	Jack Carlin	Cycling	Men's sprint	7 April 2018
2nd place, silver medalist(s)	Katie Archibald	Cycling	Women's points race	7 April 2018
2nd place, silver medalist(s)	Neah Evans	Cycling	Women's scratch race	8 April 2018
2nd place, silver medalist(s)	Paul Foster; Alex Marshall	Lawn bowls	Men's pairs	9 April 2018
2nd place, silver medalist(s)	Neil Stirton	Shooting	Men's 50 metre rifle prone	10 April 2018
2nd place, silver medalist(s)	Duncan Scott	Swimming	Men's 200 metre individual medley	10 April 2018
2nd place, silver medalist(s)	Maria Lyle	Athletics	Women's 100 metres (T35)	11 April 2018
2nd place, silver medalist(s)	Eilidh Doyle	Athletics	Women's 400 metres hurdles	12 April 2018
2nd place, silver medalist(s)	Caroline Brown; Kay Moran; Stacey McDougall	Lawn bowls	Women's triples	12 April 2018
3rd place, bronze medalist(s)	Marc Austin	Triathlon	Men's triathlon	5 April 2018
3rd place, bronze medalist(s)	Frank Baines; Hamish Carter; Kelvin Cham; Daniel Purvis; David Weir	Gymnastics	Men's artistic team all-around	5 April 2018
3rd place, bronze medalist(s)	Duncan Scott	Swimming	Men's 200 metre freestyle	6 April 2018
3rd place, bronze medalist(s)	Duncan Scott; Jack Thorpe; Kieran McGuckin; Stephen Milne; Craig McLean; Scott McLay; Daniel Wallace	Swimming	Men's 4 x 100 metre freestyle relay	6 April 2018
3rd place, bronze medalist(s)	Duncan Scott	Swimming	Men's 200 metre butterfly	7 April 2018
3rd place, bronze medalist(s)	Mark Dry	Athletics	Men's hammer throw	8 April 2018
3rd place, bronze medalist(s)	Daniel Purvis	Gymnastics	Men's floor	8 April 2018
3rd place, bronze medalist(s)	Neah Evans	Cycling	Women's points race	8 April 2018
3rd place, bronze medalist(s)	Callum Skinner	Cycling	Men's kilo	8 April 2018
3rd place, bronze medalist(s)	Stephen Milne; Duncan Scott; Daniel Wallace; Mark Szaranek	Swimming	Men's 4 × 200 metre freestyle relay	8 April 2018
3rd place, bronze medalist(s)	Frank Baines	Gymnastics	Men's parallel bars	9 April 2018
3rd place, bronze medalist(s)	Ian Shaw; Alexander Walker	Shooting	Queen's Prize pairs	10 April 2018
3rd place, bronze medalist(s)	Linda Pearson	Shooting	Women's double trap	11 April 2018
3rd place, bronze medalist(s)	James Heatly	Diving	Men's 1 metre springboard	11 April 2018
3rd place, bronze medalist(s)	Seonaid McIntosh	Shooting	Women's 50 metre rifle prone	12 April 2018
3rd place, bronze medalist(s)	Claire Johnston; Lesley Doig	Lawn bowls	Women's pairs	13 April 2018
3rd place, bronze medalist(s)	Reece McFadden	Boxing	Men's flyweight	13 April 2018
3rd place, bronze medalist(s)	John Docherty	Boxing	Men's middleweight	13 April 2018
3rd place, bronze medalist(s)	Seonaid McIntosh	Shooting	Women's 50 metre rifle three positions	13 April 2018
3rd place, bronze medalist(s)	Jake Wightman	Athletics	Men's 1500 metres	14 April 2018
3rd place, bronze medalist(s)	Kirsty Gilmour	Badminton	Women's singles	14 April 2018
3rd place, bronze medalist(s)	Robbie Simpson	Athletics	Men's marathon	15 April 2018

Relay competitors named in italics did not participate in the corresponding finals.

Medals by sport
Sport	1st place, gold medalist(s)	2nd place, silver medalist(s)	3rd place, bronze medalist(s)	Total
Athletics	0	2	3	5
Badminton	0	0	1	1
Boxing	0	0	2	2
Cycling	4	4	2	10
Diving	1	0	1	2
Gymnastics	0	0	3	3
Lawn bowls	2	2	1	5
Shooting	1	1	4	6
Swimming	1	4	4	9
Triathlon	0	0	1	1
Total	9	13	22	44

Medals by day
Day	1st place, gold medalist(s)	2nd place, silver medalist(s)	3rd place, bronze medalist(s)	Total
5 April	1	2	2	5
6 April	1	2	2	5
7 April	1	2	1	4
8 April	3	1	5	9
9 April	0	1	1	2
10 April	0	2	1	3
11 April	1	1	2	4
12 April	0	2	1	3
13 April	2	0	4	6
14 April	0	0	2	2
15 April	0	0	1	1
Total	9	13	22	44

Medals by gender
Gender	1st place, gold medalist(s)	2nd place, silver medalist(s)	3rd place, bronze medalist(s)	Total
Female	2	6	6	14
Male	7	7	15	29
Mixed	0	0	1	1
Total	9	13	22	44

== Athletics ==
Team Scotland announced the majority of its squad on 12 December 2017. Changes have been made since then and the 23-strong squad of 9 men and 14 women is accurate as of 1 March 2018.

It includes Beth Potter, who by virtue of already being selected for the triathlon will be the first ever Scot to contest two sports at the same Commonwealth Games.

Men
Track & road events

Athlete	Event	Heat		Semifinal		Final	
Athlete	Event	Result	Rank	Result	Rank	Result	Rank
Guy Learmonth	800 m	1:49.20	17	—N/a		Did not advance	
Jake Wightman	800 m	1:47.43	9 Q	—N/a		1:45.82	4
Chris O'Hare	1500 m	3:44.76	5 q	—N/a		3:39.04	8
Jake Wightman	1500 m	3:47.16	10 Q	—N/a		3:35.97	3rd place, bronze medalist(s)
Callum Hawkins	Marathon	—N/a				Did not finish	
Robbie Simpson	Marathon	—N/a				2:19:36	3rd place, bronze medalist(s)

Field events

Athlete	Event	Qualification		Final	
Athlete	Event	Distance	Rank	Distance	Rank
Allan Smith	High jump	2.21	=7 q	2.27	5 SB
David Smith	High jump	2.21	=4 q SB	2.18	=10
Chris Bennett	Hammer throw	—N/a		65.22	10
Mark Dry	Hammer throw	—N/a		73.12 SB	3rd place, bronze medalist(s)

Women
Track & road events

Athlete	Event	Heat		Semifinal		Final	
Athlete	Event	Result	Rank	Result	Rank	Result	Rank
Maria Lyle	100 m (T35)	—N/a				15.14	2nd place, silver medalist(s)
Zoey Clark	400 m	52.07	7 Q	52.06	10	Did not advance	
Lynsey Sharp	800 m	2:01.33	14	—N/a		Did not advance	
Eilish McColgan	1500 m	4:06.88	5 q	—N/a		4:04.30	6
Stephanie Twell	1500 m	4:08.66	11 Q	—N/a		4:05.56	7 SB
Samantha Kinghorn	1500 m (T54)	—N/a				3:37.91	4
Eilish McColgan	5000 m	—N/a				15:34.88	6
Stephanie Twell	5000 m	—N/a				16:05.65	14
Beth Potter	10000 m	—N/a				33:26.78	18
Eilidh Doyle	400 m hurdles	54.80	1 Q	—N/a		54.80	2nd place, silver medalist(s)
Lennie Waite	3000 m steeplechase	—N/a				10:21.72	10
Zoey Clark; Kirsten McAslan; Lynsey Sharp; Eilidh Doyle	4 × 400 m relay	—N/a				3:29.18	6 NR
Samantha Kinghorn	Marathon (T54)	—N/a				1:45:02	4

Field events

Athlete	Event	Final	
Athlete	Event	Distance	Position
Nikki Manson	High jump	1.84	7
Amy Carr	Long jump (T38)	3.65	7

Combined events – Heptathlon

Athlete	Event	100H	HJ	SP	200 m	LJ	JT	800 m	Final	Rank
Holly McArthur	Result	14.17	1.69	11.58	25.50	5.49	30.88	2:13.04	5381	10
Holly McArthur	Points	954	842	633	841	697	493	921	5381	10

== Badminton ==
Team Scotland announced its squad of 8 players (5 men and 3 women) on 14 February 2018.

Singles

Athlete	Event	Round of 64	Round of 32	Round of 16	Quarterfinal	Semifinal	Final / BM	
Athlete	Event	Opposition Score	Opposition Score	Opposition Score	Opposition Score	Opposition Score	Opposition Score	Rank
Kieran Merrilees	Men's singles	BYE	L K Yew (SGP); L 1-2	Did not advance				
Kirsty Gilmour	Women's singles	BYE	A M E Allet (MRI); W 2-0	C Birch (ENG); W 2-0	G R Shivani (IND); W 0-0 (ret.)	S Nehwal (IND); L 0-2	M Li (CAN); W 2-0	3rd place, bronze medalist(s)

Doubles

Athlete	Event	Round of 64	Round of 32	Round of 16	Quarterfinal	Semifinal	Final / BM	
Athlete	Event	Opposition Score	Opposition Score	Opposition Score	Opposition Score	Opposition Score	Opposition Score	Rank
Alexander Dunn; Adam Hall	Men's doubles	—N/a	K Ghislain (SEY) & S Malcouzane (SEY); W 2-0	D Thorpe (BAR) & C Fanus (BAR); W 2-0	G V Shem (MAS) & T W Kiong (MAS); L 0-2	Did not advance		
Martin Campbell; Patrick MacHugh	Men's doubles	—N/a	A Ayittey (GHA) & M O Baah (GHA); W 2-0	J Ho-shue (CAN) & N Yakura (CAN); L 0-2	Did not advance			
Julie MacPherson; Eleanor O'Donnell	Women's doubles	—N/a	J Ah-Wan (SEY) & A Camille (SEY); W 2-0	L Smith (ENG) & S Walker (ENG); L 0-2	Did not advance			
Eleanor O'Donnell; Alexander Dunn	Mixed doubles	V Munga (KEN) & M Joseph (KEN); W/O	B Goonethilleka (SRI) & K Sirimannage (SRI); W 2-0	C P Soon (MAS) & G L Ying (MAS); L 0-2	Did not advance			
Julie MacPherson; Martin Campbell	Mixed doubles	M Ali (PAK) & M Shahzad (PAK); W 2-0	M Ellis (ENG) & L Smith (ENG); L 0-2	Did not advance				

Mixed team

Roster

- Martin Campbell
- Alexander Dunn
- Kirsty Gilmour
- Adam Hall
- Patrick MacHugh
- Julie MacPherson
- Kieran Merrilees
- Eleanor O'Donnell

Pool A

Pos	Team	Pld	W	L	MF	MA	MD	GF	GA	GD	PF	PA	PD	Pts	Qualification
1	India	3	3	0	15	0	+15	30	1	+29	651	401	+250	3	Knockout stage
2	Scotland	3	2	1	9	6	+3	19	13	+6	592	476	+116	2	Knockout stage
3	Sri Lanka	3	1	2	5	10	−5	12	21	−9	526	619	−93	1	
4	Pakistan	3	0	3	1	14	−13	2	28	−26	348	621	−273	0	

Source: GC2018

Scotland
5
Carrara Sports and Leisure Centre, Gold Coast
5 April

Pakistan
0

			1	2	3
1	(Scotland) (Pakistan)	Alexander Dunn / Eleanor O'Donnell; Murad Ali / Palwasha Bashir	21; 12	21; 13
2	(Scotland) (Pakistan)	Kieran Merrilees; Muhammad Irfan Bhatti	21; 6	21; 16
3	(Scotland) (Pakistan)	Kirsty Gilmour; Mahoor Shahzad	21; 6	21; 10
4	(Scotland) (Pakistan)	Martin Campbell / Patrick MacHugh; Murad Ali / Muhammad Irfan Bhatti	21; 8	21; 10
5	(Scotland) (Pakistan)	Julie MacPherson / Eleanor O'Donnell; Mahoor Shahzad / Palwasha Bashir	21; 6	21; 4

Scotland
4
Carrara Sports and Leisure Centre, Gold Coast
5 April

Sri Lanka
1

			1	2	3
1	(Scotland) (Sri Lanka)	Alexander Dunn / Eleanor O'Donnell; Sachin Dias / Thilini Hendahewa	17; 21	21; 16	25; 27
2	(Scotland) (Sri Lanka)	Kieran Merrilees; Niluka Karunaratne	21; 14	21; 17
3	(Scotland) (Sri Lanka)	Kirsty Gilmour; Hasini Ambalangodage	21; 4	21; 5
4	(Scotland) (Sri Lanka)	Alexander Dunn / Adam Hall; Niluka Karunaratne / Buwaneka Goonethilleka	21; 16	21; 16
5	(Scotland) (Sri Lanka)	Kirsty Gilmour / Julie MacPherson; Thilini Hendahewa / Kavidi Sirimannage	18; 21	21; 9	21; 9

India
5
Carrara Sports and Leisure Centre, Gold Coast
6 April

Scotland
0

			1	2	3
1	(India) (Scotland)	Saina Nehwal; Julie MacPherson	21; 14	21; 12
2	(India) (Scotland)	Srikanth Kidambi; Kieran Merrilees	21; 18	21; 2
3	(India) (Scotland)	N. Sikki Reddy / Ashwini Ponnappa; Kirsty Gilmour / Eleanor O'Donnell	21; 8	21; 12
4	(India) (Scotland)	Satwiksairaj Rankireddy / Chirag Shetty; Patrick MacHugh / Adam Hall	21; 16	21; 19
5	(India) (Scotland)	Pranaav Jerry Chopra / N. Sikki Reddy; Martin Campbell / Julie MacPherson	21; 17	21; 15

Quarterfinals

Scotland
0
Carrara Sports and Leisure Centre, Gold Coast
7 April

Malaysia
3

			1	2	3
1	(Scotland) (Malaysia)	Adam Hall / Julie MacPherson; Chan Peng Soon / Goh Liu Ying	21; 14	18; 21	15; 21
2	(Scotland) (Malaysia)	Kieran Merrilees; Lee Chong Wei	14; 21	7; 21
3	(Scotland) (Malaysia)	Alexander Dunn / Adam Hall; Goh V Shem / Tan Wee Kiong	10; 21	15; 21
4	(Scotland) (Malaysia)	Kirsty Gilmour; Soniia Cheah				not played
5	(Scotland) (Malaysia)	Eleanor O'Donnell / Julie MacPherson; Vivian Hoo / Chow Mei Kuan				not played

== Basketball ==
Scotland was invited by FIBA and the CGF to enter a team of 12 men.

The squad was announced on 17 January 2018.

=== Men's tournament ===
Roster

- Kieron Achara
- Jonathan Bunyan
- Bantu Burroughs
- Chris Cleary
- Nick Collins
- Alasdair Fraser
- Kyle Jimenez
- Callan Low
- Fraser Malcolm
- Gareth Murray
- Sean Nealon-Lino
- Michael Vigor

Pool B

Team	Pld	W	L	PF	PA	PD	Pts	Qualification
Scotland	3	3	0	237	198	+39	6	Qualifying finals
England	3	2	1	246	186	+60	5	Qualifying finals
Cameroon	3	1	2	202	231	−29	4	
India	3	0	3	222	292	−70	3	

5 April 2018
17:30

Boxscore

England	65–78	Scotland
Scoring by quarter: 19–17, 13–18, 16–14, 17–29
Pts: Walker 17; Rebs: Jackman 9 Asts: Jackman 5		Pts: Bunyah 18; Rebs: Fraser, Achara 8 Asts: Fraser, Achara 4

Townsville Entertainment and Convention Centre, Townsville
Referees: Matthew Beattie (USA), Kingsley Ojeaburu (UGR)

7 April 2018
20:00

Boxscore

Scotland	63–52	Cameroon
Scoring by quarter: 15–4, 14–11, 15–25, 19–12
Pts: Murray 25; Rebs: Fraser 9 Asts: Achara, Murray 3		Pts: Kome 21; Rebs: Yangue 13; Asts: Essome 5

Townsville Entertainment and Convention Centre, Townsville
Referees: Leonardo Zalazar (ARG), Jon Chapman (AUS)

8 April 2018
21:00

Boxscore

India	81–96	Scotland
Scoring by quarter: 26–33, 15–16, 11–29, 29–18
Pts: J. Singh 27; Rebs: J. Singh 14; Asts: At. Singh 7		Pts: Collins 16; Rebs: Vigor 12; Asts: Vigor 7

Townsville Entertainment and Convention Centre, Townsville
Referees: Kingsley Ojeaburu (NGR), Matthew Bathurst (NZL)

Qualifying finals

10 April 2018
17:30

Boxscore

Nigeria	61–66	Scotland
Scoring by quarter: 16–23, 12–17, 18–6, 15–20
Pts: Diogu 24; Rebs: Diogu 15; Asts: Iroegbu, Ofoegbu 4		Pts: Murray 17; Rebs: Murray, Achara 8 Asts: Malcolm 4

Cairns Convention Centre, Cairns
Referees: Arnauld Kom Njilo (CMR), Artur Decastro (MOZ)

Semifinals

14 April 2018
10:00

Boxscore

Australia	103–46	Scotland
Scoring by quarter: 20–4, 28–18, 35–10, 20–14
Pts: Wagstaff 17; Rebs: Brandt 6 Asts: Sobey 6		Pts: Malcolm, Fraser 9 Rebs: Murray, Nealon-Lino 4 Asts: Bunyan 6

Gold Coast Convention and Exhibition Centre, Gold Coast
Referees: Leonardo Zalazar (ARG), Kingsley Ojeaburu (NGR)

Bronze medal match

15 April 2018
09:00

Boxscore

Scotland	69–79	New Zealand
Scoring by quarter: 21–19, 14–22, 9–18, 25–20
Pts: Bunyan 13; Rebs: Fraser 6 Asts: Bunyan 5		Pts: Abercrombie 26; Rebs: Loe 10; Asts: Loe 4

Gold Coast Convention and Exhibition Centre, Gold Coast
Referees: Beattie (USA), Weiland (CAN),
Boyer (AUS)

== Beach volleyball ==
Scotland qualified a team of two men by winning the European Qualification Tournament in Cyprus. In addition, they accepted an invitation by FIVB and the CGF to enter a team of two women.

Athlete	Event	Preliminary round				Quarterfinals	Semifinals	Final / GM	
Athlete	Event	Opposition Score	Opposition Score	Opposition Score	Rank	Opposition Score	Opposition Score	Opposition Score	Rank
Robin Miedzybrodzki; Seain Cook	Men's	Pradeep & Yapa (SRI); W 2–1 (21–15, 18–21, 16–14)	Kamara & Lombi (SLE); W 2–1 (19–21, 21–18, 15–12)	Pedlow & Schachter (CAN); L 0–2 (12–21, 17–21)	2 Q	Gregory & Sheaf (ENG); L 0–2 (14–21, 17–21)	Did not advance		
Lynne Beattie; Melissa Coutts	Women's	Stafford & Williams (GRN); W 2–0 (21–8, 21–11)	Konstantinou & Angelopoulou (CYP); L 0–2 (8–21, 16–21)	Del Solar & Clancy (AUS); L 0–2 (9–21, 9–21)	3 Q	Humana-Paredes & Pavan (CAN); L 0–2 (9–21, 9–21)	Did not advance		

== Boxing ==
Team Scotland announced the majority of its 11-strong squad (9 men and 2 women) on 30 November 2017.

Following a men's light heavyweight box-off at the GB Boxing Championships, another boxer was added on 12 December 2017. A further addition to the squad was made on 1 February 2018.

Men

Athlete	Event	Round of 32	Round of 16	Quarterfinals	Semifinals	Final	Rank
Athlete	Event	Opposition Result	Opposition Result	Opposition Result	Opposition Result	Opposition Result	Rank
Aqeel Ahmed	−49 kg	—N/a	Bye	Panghal (IND); L 1-4	Did not advance		
Reece McFadden	−52 kg	—N/a	Allicock (GUY); W 4-1	Asif (PAK); W 5-0	Irvine (NIR); L 1-4	Did not advance	3rd place, bronze medalist(s)
Nathaniel Collins	−60 kg	Bye	Caleb (NRU); W 3-2	Garside (AUS); L 0-5	Did not advance		
Robbie McKechnie	−64 kg	Bye	Blumenfeld (CAN); L 0-5	Did not advance			
Stephen Newns	−69 kg	Moleni (TGA); W 4-1	Richardson (AIA); W 5-0	Hill (FIJ); L 0-5	Did not advance		
John Docherty	−75 kg	Alberte (MRI); W 5-0	Kokkinos (CYP); W 5-0	Whittaker (ENG); W 4-1	Ntsengue (CMR); L 0-5	Did not advance	3rd place, bronze medalist(s)
Sean Lazzerini	−81 kg	—N/a	Waterman (AUS); L 1-4	Did not advance			
Scott Forrest	−91 kg	—N/a	Ochola (KEN); W 5-0	Clarke (ENG); L 0-4	Did not advance		
Mitchell Barton	+91 kg	—N/a	Mailata (NZL); L 0-5	Did not advance			

Women

Athlete	Event	Round of 16	Quarterfinals	Semifinals	Final	Rank
Athlete	Event	Opposition Result	Opposition Result	Opposition Result	Opposition Result	Rank
Meagan Gordon	−48 kg	Bye	Kom (IND); L 0-5	Did not advance		
Vikki Glover	−57 kg	Spicer (DMA); W 4-1	Aubin-Boucher (CAN); L 2-3	Did not advance		

== Cycling ==
Team Scotland announced its squad on 14 February 2018. Andy Fenn subsequently withdrew himself due to changes in his race programme, ergo the 15-strong squad now consists of 9 men and 6 women.

=== Road ===
Men

Athlete	Event	Time	Rank
Grant Ferguson	Road race	3:59:35	35
Kyle Gordon	Road race	DNF	
Mark Stewart	Road race	3:57:58	17
John Archibald	Time trial	52:01.35	11
Kyle Gordon	Time trial	54:33.77	27
Mark Stewart	Time trial	52:55.32	16

Women

Athlete	Event	Time	Rank
Katie Archibald	Road race	3:03:38	23
Neah Evans	Road race	3:02:26	8
Eileen Roe	Road race	DNF	
Isla Short	Road race	DNF	
Katie Archibald	Time trial	37:07.38	4
Neah Evans	Time trial	39:23.90	8

=== Track ===
Sprint

Athlete	Event	Qualification		Round 1	Quarterfinals	Semifinals	Final	
Athlete	Event	Time	Rank	Opposition Time	Opposition Time	Opposition Time	Opposition Time	Rank
Jack Carlin	Men's sprint	9.650	2 Q	N Phillip (TTO); W 10.989	J Truman (ENG); L 10.247; W 10.256; W 10.271	J Schmid (AUS); W 10.256; W 10.424	S Webster (NZL); L 10.123; L 9.952	2nd place, silver medalist(s)
Callum Skinner	Men's sprint	DNS						
Neil Fachie; Matt Rotherham (pilot)	Men's tandem sprint B	9.568	1 Q WR GR	—N/a		B Henderson & T Clarke (AUS) (pilot); W 10.443; W 10.273	J Ball & P Mitchell (WAL) (pilot); W 10.531; W 10.189	1st place, gold medalist(s)
Aileen McGlynn; Louise Haston (pilot)	Women's tandem sprint B	11.157	3	—N/a			Did not advance	

Keirin

Athlete	Event	Round 1	Repechage	Semifinals	Final
Jack Carlin	Men's keirin	1 Q	—N/a	2 Q	4
Callum Skinner	Men's keirin	5 R	4	Did not advance	

Time trial

Athlete	Event	Time	Rank
Callum Skinner	Men's time trial	1:01.083	3rd place, bronze medalist(s)
Jonathan Wale	Men's time trial	1:01.261	5
Neil Fachie; Matt Rotherham (pilot)	Men's tandem time trial B	1:00.065	1st place, gold medalist(s)
Aileen McGlynn; Louise Haston (pilot)	Women's tandem time trial B	1:08.993	3

Pursuit

Athlete	Event	Qualification		Final	
Athlete	Event	Time	Rank	Opponent Results	Rank
John Archibald	Men's pursuit	4:13.068	2 Q	4:16.656	2nd place, silver medalist(s)
Kyle Gordon	Men's pursuit	4:18.494	9	Did not advance	
Mark Stewart	Men's pursuit	4:20.256	11	Did not advance	
Katie Archibald	Women's pursuit	3:24.119	1 Q GR	3:26.088	1st place, gold medalist(s)

Points race

Athlete	Event	Qualification		Final	
Athlete	Event	Points	Rank	Points	Rank
John Archibald	Men's point race	24	5 Q	29	11
Kyle Gordon	Men's point race	3	11 Q	–37	20
Mark Stewart	Men's point race	8	6 Q	81	1st place, gold medalist(s)
Katie Archibald	Women's points race	—N/a		20	2nd place, silver medalist(s)
Neah Evans	Women's points race	—N/a		17	3rd place, bronze medalist(s)
Eileen Roe	Women's points race	—N/a		0	16

Scratch race

Athlete	Event	Qualification	Final
John Archibald	Men's scratch race	1 Q	8
Kyle Gordon	Men's scratch race	10 Q	11
Mark Stewart	Men's scratch race	9 Q	7
Katie Archibald	Women's scratch race	—N/a	4
Neah Evans	Women's scratch race	—N/a	2nd place, silver medalist(s)
Eileen Roe	Women's scratch race	—N/a	22

=== Mountain bike ===
Athlete	Event	Time	Rank
Grant Ferguson	Men's cross-country	1:22:29	9
Isla Short	Women's cross-country	1:21:34	5

== Diving ==
Team Scotland announced its squad of 4 divers (2 men and 2 women) on 14 February 2018.

Men

Athlete	Event	Preliminaries		Final	
Athlete	Event	Points	Rank	Points	Rank
James Heatly	1 m springboard	366.05	3 Q	399.25	3rd place, bronze medalist(s)
Lucas Thomson	1 m springboard	295.40	11 Q	288.05	12
James Heatly	3 m springboard	390.05	7 Q	420.30	5
Lucas Thomson	10 m platform	321.65	10 Q	402.80	5
James Heatly; Lucas Thomson	10 m synchronised platform	—N/a		369.60	5

Women

Athlete	Event	Preliminaries		Final	
Athlete	Event	Points	Rank	Points	Rank
Grace Reid	1 m springboard	259.25	6 Q	275.30	1st place, gold medalist(s)
Grace Reid	3 m springboard	305.15	5 Q	282.00	9
Gemma McArthur	10 m platform	273.15	11 Q	263.05	12

== Gymnastics ==
Team Scotland announced the majority of its 10-strong squad (5 men and 5 women) on 14 February 2018. Further additions to the squad were made on 20 February 2018 and 1 March 2018.

=== Artistic ===
Men
Team Final & Individual Qualification

Athlete	Event	Apparatus						Total	Rank
Athlete	Event	F	PH	R	V	PB	HB	Total	Rank
Frank Baines	Team	13.725	11.700	12.625	14.100	14.050	13.300	79.500	8 Q
Hamish Carter	Team	14.275	13.250	12.800	14.100	13.700	13.250	81.375	5 Q
Kelvin Cham	Team	–	~~10.900~~	~~11.700~~	–	–	–	—N/a	
Daniel Purvis	Team	13.850	12.250	13.550	~~13.100~~	13.550	12.950	79.250	10
David Weir	Team	~~13.400~~	–	–	13.950	~~12.850~~	~~12.700~~	—N/a	
Total	Team	41.850	37.200	38.975	42.150	41.300	39.500	240.975	3rd place, bronze medalist(s)

Individual Finals

Athlete	Event	Apparatus						Total	Rank
Athlete	Event	F	PH	R	V	PB	HB	Total	Rank
Frank Baines	All-around	14.550	13.700	12.750	14.200	14.150	13.200	82.550	4
Frank Baines	Parallel bars	—N/a				14.400	—N/a	14.400	3rd place, bronze medalist(s)
Frank Baines	Horizontal bar	—N/a					13.333	13.333	4
Hamish Carter	All-around	14.600	11.750	13.250	14.100	13.500	13.850	81.050	6
Hamish Carter	Floor	13.633	—N/a					13.633	4
Hamish Carter	Horizontal bar	—N/a					11.033	11.033	8
Daniel Purvis	Floor	13.733	—N/a					13.733	3rd place, bronze medalist(s)
Daniel Purvis	Rings	—N/a		13.233	—N/a			13.233	7

Women
Team Final & Individual Qualification

Athlete	Event	Apparatus				Total	Rank
Athlete	Event	V	UB	BB	F	Total	Rank
Shannon Archer	Team	13.900	11.050	11.350	12.050	48.350	11 Q
Cara Kennedy	Team	13.550	10.950	11.200	11.900	47.600	13 Q
Sofia Ramzan	Team	–	–	~~10.400~~	~~11.500~~	—N/a	
Ellie Russell	Team	13.150	~~10.500~~	–	–	—N/a	
Isabella Tolometti	Team	~~12.450~~	11.300	10.650	11.900	46.300	15
Total	Team	40.060	33.300	33.200	35.850	142.950	5

Individual Finals

Athlete	Event	Apparatus				Total	Rank
Athlete	Event	V	UB	BB	F	Total	Rank
Shannon Archer	All-around	13.700	11.000	12.050	12.100	48.850	10
Shannon Archer	Vault	13.683	—N/a			13.683	5
Cara Kennedy	All-around	13.700	11.200	11.950	12.300	49.150	9
Cara Kennedy	Vault	13.566	—N/a			13.566	7

== Hockey ==
Scotland qualified both men's and women's teams by placing in the top nine (excluding the host nation, Australia) among Commonwealth nations in the FIH World Rankings as of 31 October 2017. Each team consists of 18 players for a total of 36.

Both initial teams were announced on 14 February 2018. The current teams are correct as of 9 March 2018.

=== Men's tournament ===
Squad

- Tommy Alexander
- Russell Anderson
- Kenneth Bain
- Michael Bremner
- Gavin Byers
- Callum Duke
- Alan Forsyth
- David Forsyth
- Cameron Fraser
- Chris Grassick
- Rob Harwood
- William Marshall
- Steven McIlravey
- Gordon McIntyre
- Lee Morton
- Nick Parkes
- Duncan Riddell
- Jamie Wong

Pool A

Pos	Team	Pld	W	D	L	GF	GA	GD	Pts	Qualification
1	Australia (H)	4	4	0	0	16	2	+14	12	Advance to Semi-finals
2	New Zealand	4	3	0	1	18	6	+12	9	Advance to Semi-finals
3	Scotland	4	1	0	3	7	14	−7	3	5th–6th place match
4	Canada	4	1	0	3	3	12	−9	3	7th–8th place match
5	South Africa	4	1	0	3	4	14	−10	3	9th–10th place match

Source: FIH
Rules for classification: 1) points; 2) number of wins; 3) goal difference; 4) goals scored; 5) head-to-head results.
(H) Hosts

5 April 2018
21:30

South Africa	2–4	Scotland
Heyns 37'; Drummond 43'	Report	Harwood 6'; Bain 13', 46'; Forsyth 14'

Umpires:
Eric Koh (MAS)
Jamie Hooper (GBR)

7 April 2018
11:30

Canada	1–0	Scotland
Sarmento 11'	Report

Umpires:
Deepak Joshi (IND)
Paul Walker (ENG)

8 April 2018
21:30

Australia	6–1	Scotland
Zalewski 2'; Beale 2'; Wickham 13'; Wotherspoon 15'; Ogilvie 20'; Kleinschmidt 43'	Report	Harwood 23'

Umpires:
Eric Koh (MAS)
Anbananthan Rawi (MAS)

10 April 2018
11:30

New Zealand	5–2	Scotland
Russell 3', 30', 34'; J. Panchia 4'; Inglis 50'	Report	Forsyth 20', 53'

Umpires:
Anbananthan Rawi (MAS)
Deepak Joshi (IND)

Fifth and sixth place

13 April 2018
16:15

Scotland	1–2	Malaysia
Forsyth 11'	Report	Shahril 21'; Amirol 39'

Umpires:
Deepak Joshi (IND)
Paul Walker (ENG)

=== Women's tournament ===
Squad

- Amy Brodie
- Camilla Brown
- Nicki Cochrane
- Robyn Collins
- Rebecca Condie
- Amy Costello
- Kareena Cuthbert
- Mairi Drummond
- Amy Gibson
- Alison Howie
- Sarah Jamieson
- Lucy Lanigan
- Nikki Lloyd
- Sarah Robertson
- Katie Robertson
- Nicola Skrastin
- Rebecca Ward
- Charlotte Watson

Pool B

Pos	Team	Pld	W	D	L	GF	GA	GD	Pts	Qualification
1	Australia (H)	4	3	1	0	8	0	+8	10	Advance to Semi-finals
2	New Zealand	4	2	2	0	18	1	+17	8	Advance to Semi-finals
3	Canada	4	1	2	1	5	2	+3	5	5th–6th place match
4	Scotland	4	1	1	2	6	8	−2	4	7th–8th place match
5	Ghana	4	0	0	4	1	27	−26	0	9th–10th place match

Source: FIH
Rules for classification: 1) points; 2) number of wins; 3) goal difference; 4) goals scored; 5) head-to-head results.
(H) Hosts

5 April 2018
11:30

Scotland	1–6	New Zealand
Howie 53'	Report	Smith 10'; Neal 12'; Gloyn 18', 48'; Keddell 18', 45'

Umpires:
Ayanna McClean (USA)
Cookie Tan (SGP)

6 April 2018
21:30

Canada	0–0	Scotland
	Report

Umpires:
Durga Devi (IND)
Jo Cumming (NZL)

9 April 2018
16:30

Scotland	5–0	Ghana
Collins 11'; K. Robertson 12'; Brown 37'; Brodie 45'; Alexander-Lloyd 47'	Report

Umpires:
Nur Hafizah Azman (MAS)
Catherine Wright (WAL)

10 April 2018
21:30

Australia	2–0	Scotland
Kenny 12'; Stewart 41'	Report

Umpires:
Durgi Devi (IND)
Lelia Sacre (CAN)

Seventh and eighth place

12 April 2018
15:45

Malaysia	2–4	Scotland
Fatin 31'; Nuraini 40'	Report	Brown 5'; Brodie 22', 27'; Lanigan 51'

Umpires:
Jo Cumming (NZL)
Wanri Venter (RSA)

== Lawn bowls ==
Team Scotland announced its squad of 17 lawn bowlers and directors (10 men and 7 women) in two tranches.

The first tranche of 10 participants was announced on 3 October 2017; the second tranche of 7 participants was announced on 30 November 2017.

Men

Athlete	Event	Group Stage						Quarterfinal	Semifinal	Final / BM	
Athlete	Event	Opposition Score	Opposition Score	Opposition Score	Opposition Score	Opposition Score	Rank	Opposition Score	Opposition Score	Opposition Score	Rank
Darren Burnett	Singles	Bell (SAM); W 21 – 2	Tagelagi (NIU); W 21 – 3	Priaulx (GUE); W 21 – 13	Omar (BRU); W 21 – 8	Rusli (MAS); W 21 – 19	1 Q	Rusli (MAS); W 21 – 13	Bester (CAN); L 19 – 21	Paxton (ENG); L 14 – 21	4
Paul Foster; Alex Marshall	Pairs	Niue; W 14 – 11	Samoa; W 37 – 6	India; W 17 – 12	Norfolk Island; W 14 – 12	Malaysia; W 27 – 9	1 Q	Malaysia; W 16 – 11	Malta; W 18 – 8	Wales; L 10 – 12	2nd place, silver medalist(s)
Darren Burnett; Ronnie Duncan; Derek Oliver	Triples	Cook Islands; W 27 – 11	Malaysia; T 17 – 17	Norfolk Island; W 20 – 11	Northern Ireland; L 14 – 16	—N/a	1 Q	Wales; W 15 – 13	Norfolk Island; W 20 – 8	Australia; W 19 – 14	1st place, gold medalist(s)
Ronnie Duncan; Paul Foster; Alex Marshall; Derek Oliver	Fours	Brunei; W 25 – 9	Singapore; W 29 – 5	England; W 12 – 8	—N/a		1 Q	Malaysia; W 13 – 12	England; W 18 – 10	Australia; W 15 – 13	1st place, gold medalist(s)

Women

Athlete	Event	Group Stage					Quarterfinal	Semifinal	Final / BM	
Athlete	Event	Opposition Score	Opposition Score	Opposition Score	Opposition Score	Rank	Opposition Score	Opposition Score	Opposition Score	Rank
Caroline Brown	Singles	MacDonald (JER); W 21 – 13	Beere (GUE); W 21 – 6	Matali (BRU); W 21 – 12	Daniels (WAL); W 21 – 13	1 Q	Daniels (CAN); L 12 – 21	Did not advance		
Lesley Doig; Claire Johnston	Pairs	Botswana; W 25 – 9	Brunei; W 32 – 9	Cook Islands; W 36 – 10	Malaysia; L 11 – 18	2 Q	Australia; W 16 – 15	South Africa; L 10 – 18	Canada; W 18 – 10	3rd place, bronze medalist(s)
Caroline Brown; Stacey McDougall; Kay Moran	Triples	Norfolk Island; W 16 – 9	Cook Islands; W 28 – 10	Malaysia; L 10 – 17	—N/a	2 Q	Malaysia; W 17 – 15	Canada; W 19 – 7	Australia; L 12 – 21	2nd place, silver medalist(s)
Lesley Doig; Claire Johnston; Stacey McDougall; Kay Moran	Fours	Niue; W 44 – 1	Canada; W 21 – 7	Wales; W 22 – 10	—N/a	1 Q	Canada; L 11 – 24	Did not advance		

Para-sport

Athlete	Event	Group Stage						Semifinal	Final / BM	
Athlete	Event	Opposition Score	Opposition Score	Opposition Score	Opposition Score	Opposition Score	Rank	Opposition Score	Opposition Score	Rank
Robert Barr (directed by Sarah Jane Ewing); Irene Edgar (directed by David Thomas)	Pairs	England; W 16 – 6	Wales; L 7 – 13	South Africa; L 3 – 18	New Zealand; W 23 – 5	Australia; W 15 – 11	3 Q	Australia; L 8 – 14	Wales; L 12 – 13	4
Garry Brown; Mike Nicoll; Michael Simpson	Triples	Australia; L 6 – 18	Wales; W 27 – 4	New Zealand; L 9 – 17	England; L 10 – 18	South Africa; L 7 – 15	5	Did not advance		

== Netball ==
Scotland qualified a team of 12 players by virtue of being ranked in the top 11 (excluding the host nation, Australia) of the INF World Rankings on 1 July 2017.

The following was the Scotland roster at the netball tournament of the 2018 Commonwealth Games.

Scotland – 2018 Commonwealth Games roster
Players
Coaches

Name	Pos	DOB	Height	Club	Nat	Caps
Claire Brownie (c)	C, WD	10 August 1988 (aged 29)	1.75 m (5 ft 9 in)	UWS Sirens	(Scotland)
Fiona Fowler	GD, GK	18 April 1990 (aged 27)	1.85 m (6 ft 1 in)	Adelaide Thunderbirds	(Australia)
Lynsey Gallagher	GS, GA, WA	20 May 1992 (aged 25)	1.75 m (5 ft 9 in)	UWS Sirens	(Scotland)
Ella Gibbons	GD, GK	24 November 1994 (aged 23)	1.91 m (6 ft 3 in)	UWS Sirens	(Scotland)
Bethan Goodwin	GS, GA	4 July 1999 (aged 18)	1.85 m (6 ft 1 in)	UWS Sirens	(Scotland)
Niamh McCall	GA, WA	28 April 2000 (aged 17)	1.78 m (5 ft 10 in)	East Kilbride	(Scotland)
Nicola McCleery	WA, C	12 October 1995 (aged 22)	1.68 m (5 ft 6 in)	UWS Sirens	(Scotland)
Hayley Mulheron	GK, GD	27 April 1986 (aged 31)	1.85 m (6 ft 1 in)	Team Northumbria	(England)
Samantha Murphy	C, WA, WD	29 July 1991 (aged 26)	1.67 m (5 ft 6 in)	UWS Sirens	(Scotland)
Emily Nicholl	GD, WD	24 May 1994 (aged 23)	1.80 m (5 ft 11 in)	UWS Sirens	(Scotland)
Joanne Pettitt	GS, GA	21 May 1995 (aged 22)	1.83 m (6 ft 0 in)	UWS Sirens	(Scotland)
Bethany Sutherland	WD, GD	22 April 1997 (aged 20)	1.80 m (5 ft 11 in)	UWS Sirens	(Scotland)

Head coach

Gail Parata

Legend

- (C) Team captain
- Club field describes current pro club
- Injured

Pool B

Pos	Team	Pld	W	D	L	GF	GA	GD	Pts	Qualification
1	England	5	5	0	0	342	202	+140	10	Semi-finals
2	New Zealand	5	3	0	2	292	235	+57	6	Semi-finals
3	Uganda	5	3	0	2	287	248	+39	6	Classification matches
4	Malawi	5	3	0	2	277	284	−7	6	Classification matches
5	Scotland	5	1	0	4	195	289	−94	2	Classification matches
6	Wales	5	0	0	5	215	350	−135	0	Classification matches

Updated to match(es) played on 11 April 2018. Source: GC2018

5 April 2018
15:00

Report
England
74–28
Scotland

Gold Coast Convention and Exhibition Centre
Umpires: Kristie Simpson
Joshua Bowring
Reserve umpire: Michelle Phippard
Harten 40/43 (93%)
Corbin 17/18 (94%)
Housby 17/21 (81%)

Goodwin 15/19 (79%)
Gallagher 7/11 (64%)
McCall 4/7 (57%)
Pettitt 2/6 (33%)

7 April 2018
18:30

Report
Scotland
51–47
Wales

Gold Coast Convention and Exhibition Centre
Umpires: Helen George
Angela Armstrong-Lush
Reserve umpire: Marc Henning
Goodwin 38/45 (84%)
Gallagher 13/14 (93%)

Lewis 39/48 (81%)
Moseley 5/8 (63%)
Llewelyn 3/3 (100%)

9 April 2018
20:30

Report
New Zealand
60–29
Scotland

Gold Coast Convention and Exhibition Centre
Umpires: Kate Stephenson
Michelle Phippard
Reserve umpire: Joshua Bowring
Selby-Rickit 33/37 (89%)
Folau 27/35 (77%)

Goodwin 23/28 (82%)
Gallagher 6/7 (86%)

10 April 2018
15:00

Report
Scotland
50–51
Malawi

Gold Coast Convention and Exhibition Centre
Umpires: Jono Bredin
Lisa McPhail
Reserve umpire: Kristie Simpson
Goodwin 38/42 (90%)
Gallagher 12/15 (80%)

Kumwenda 44/47 (94%)
Chimaliro 7/8 (88%)

11 April 2018
16:00

Report
Uganda
57–37
Scotland

Gold Coast Convention and Exhibition Centre
Umpires: Helen George
Angela Armstrong-Lush
Reserve umpire: Theresa Prince
Proscovia 32/34 (94%)
Nanyonga 25/30 (83%)

Gallagher 19/21 (90%)
Goodwin 16/25 (64%)
McCall 2/8 (25%)

Ninth place match

12 April 2018
11:00

Report
Barbados
48–50
Scotland

Gold Coast Convention and Exhibition Centre
Umpires: Helen George
Maria van der Merwe
Reserve umpire: Gary Burgess
Payne 22/24 (92%)
Blackman 15/17 (88%)
Wharton 11/12 (92%)

Gallagher 35/37 (95%)
Goodwin 13/21 (62%)
Pettitt 2/5 (40%)

== Rugby sevens ==
Scotland qualified a team for the men's tournament by being among the top nine ranked nations from the Commonwealth in the 2016–17 World Rugby Sevens Series ranking.

The 13-strong squad was named on 15 March 2018.

=== Men's tournament ===
Squad

Glenn Bryce
Matt Fagerson
Jamie Farndale
James Fleming
Nyle Godsmark
Darcy Graham
George Horne
Ruaridh Jackson
Lee Jones
Gavin Lowe
Max McFarland
Joe Nayacavou
Scott Riddell

Pool A

Pos	Team	Pld	W	D	L	PF	PA	PD	Pts	Qualification
1	South Africa	3	3	0	0	121	5	+116	9	Semi-finals
2	Scotland	3	2	0	1	73	26	+47	7	Classification semi-finals
3	Papua New Guinea	3	1	0	2	31	84	−53	5	
4	Malaysia	3	0	0	3	5	115	−110	3	

Source: GC2018
Rules for classification: 1) Points; 2) Head-to-head result; 3) Point difference; 4) Points scored.

14 April 2018
11:43

Scotland	27–0	Papua New Guinea
Try: Farndale (2) 1' c, 8' m Graham 3' m Horne 5' m Fleming 14'; Con: Horne (1/1) 1'; Jackson (0/3)	(Gold Coast 2018)	Cards: Baramun (yellow card) 14'

Robina Stadium, Gold Coast
Referee: Tevita Rokovereni (Fiji)

14 April 2018
18:15

Scotland	41–0	Malaysia
Try: Graham 1' m Farndale (2) 3' c, 4' m Horne (2) 6' m, 10' c McFarland 7' c Fergusson 13' m Con: Jackson (1/4) 3'; Horne (2/2) 7', 10'; Fergusson (0/1)	(Gold Coast 2018)

Robina Stadium, Gold Coast
Referee: Richard Haughton (England)

14 April 2018
22:17

South Africa	26–5	Scotland
Try: Specman 4' c Nel 8' c Afrika 9' m Geduld 12' c Con: Geduld (3/4) 5', 8', 12'	(Gold Coast 2018)	Try: Farndale 14' m Con: Fergusson (0/1); Cards: Jackson (yellow card) 7' to 9'

Robina Stadium, Gold Coast
Referee: Damon Murphy (Australia)

Classification semi-finals

15 April 2018
10:37

Scotland	19–12	Wales
Try: Horne (2) 3' c, 6' c Farndale 11' m Con: Horne (2/3) 4', 6'	(Gold Coast 2018)	Try: Morgan (2) 2' m, 8' c Con: Davies (1/2) 8'

Robina Stadium, Gold Coast
Referee: Jordan Way (Australia)

Match for fifth place

15 April 2018
13:33

Australia	26–0	Scotland
Try: Parahi (2) 1' c, 4' c Anderson 10' c Killingworth 12' m Con: Porch (3/3) 2', 4', 11'; O'Donnell (0/1)	(Gold Coast 2018)	Cards: McFarland (yellow card) 4' to 6'

Robina Stadium, Gold Coast
Referee: Craig Evans (Wales)

== Shooting ==
Team Scotland announced the majority of its 13-strong squad (7 men and 6 women) on 30 November 2017. Further additions to the squad were made on 14 February 2018 and 1 March 2018.

Men

Athlete	Event	Qualification		Final	
Athlete	Event	Points	Rank	Points	Rank
Neil Stirton	50 metre rifle 3 positions	1140	11	Did not advance	
Neil Stirton	50 metre rifle prone	616.9	4 Q	247.7	2nd place, silver medalist(s)
Leonard Thomson	50 metre rifle prone	614.6	5 Q	121.2	8
Aedan Evans	10 metre air pistol	559	12	Did not advance	
Calum Fraser	Double trap	129	10	Did not advance	
David McMath	Double trap	137 +6	1 Q	74	(gold) GR

Women

Athlete	Event	Qualification		Final	
Athlete	Event	Points	Rank	Points	Rank
Jennifer McIntosh	50 metre rifle 3 positions	578	4 Q	398.2	8
Seonaid McIntosh	50 metre rifle 3 positions	576	6 Q	444.6	3rd place, bronze medalist(s)
Jennifer McIntosh	50 metre rifle prone	—N/a		612.9	8
Seonaid McIntosh	50 metre rifle prone	—N/a		618.1	3rd place, bronze medalist(s)
Jennifer McIntosh	10 metre air rifle	409.4	9	Did not advance	
Seonaid McIntosh	10 metre air rifle	410.4	7 Q	183.1	5
Jessica Liddon	25 metre pistol	582	10	Did not advance	
Caroline Brownlie	10 metre air pistol	359	18	Did not advance	
Jessica Liddon	10 metre air pistol	362	13	Did not advance	
Sharon Niven	Trap	67+2	5 Q	14	6
Linda Pearson	Double trap	—N/a		87	3rd place, bronze medalist(s)

Open

Athlete	Event	Day 1	Day 2	Day 3	Total	
Athlete	Event	Points	Points	Points	Overall	Rank
Ian Shaw	Queen's prize individual	104-11v	150-18v	148-10v	402-39v	4
Alexander Walker	Queen's prize individual	103-10v	149-15v	147-13v	399-38v	13
Ian Shaw; Alexander Walker	Queen's prize pairs	298-31v	284-18v	—N/a	582-49v	3rd place, bronze medalist(s)

== Squash ==
Team Scotland announced its squad of 5 players (3 men and 2 women) in two tranches.

The first tranche of 2 players was announced on 8 November 2017; the second tranche of 3 players was announced on 20 February 2018.

Singles

Athlete	Event	Round of 64	Round of 32	Round of 16	Quarterfinals	Semifinals	Final	Rank
Athlete	Event	Opposition Score	Opposition Score	Opposition Score	Opposition Score	Opposition Score	Opposition Score	Rank
Alan Clyne (8)	Men's singles	Bye	T Aslam (PAK); W 3-1	R Hedrick (AUS); W 3-0	J Makin (WAL); L 2-3	did not advance		
Greg Lobban (9)	Men's singles	Bye	R Laksiri (SRI); W 3-0	D Selby (ENG); L 1-3	did not advance			
Kevin Moran	Men's singles	J Snagg (SVG); W 3-0	C Grayson (NZL); L 0-3	did not advance				
Lisa Aitken (11)	Women's singles	Bye	A Azman (MAS); L W/O	did not advance				
Alison Thomson	Women's singles	Bye	S Subramaniam (MAS); L 1-3	did not advance				

Doubles

Athlete	Event	Group stage				Round of 16	Quarterfinals	Semifinals	Third place	
Athlete	Event	Opposition Score	Opposition Score	Opposition Score	Rank	Opposition Score	Opposition Score	Opposition Score	Opposition Score	Rank
Alan Clyne; Greg Lobban	Men's Doubles	J-R Khalil (GUY); S Seth (GUY); W 2-0	M Chilambwe (ZAM); K Ndhlovu (ZAM); W 2-0	—N/a	1 Q	M Patrick (TTO); K Wilson (TTO); W 2-0	M S Kamal (MAS); E Y Ng (MAS); W 2-1	Z Alexander (NZL); D Palmer (NZL); L 0-2	D James (ENG); J Willstrop (ENG); L 0-2	4
Lisa Aitken; Alison Thomson	Women's Doubles	J Duncalf (ENG); A Waters (ENG); L 0-2	L Massaro (ENG); S-J Perry (ENG); L 1-2	E Bridgeman (CAY); C Laing (CAY); W 2-0	3	—N/a	Did not advance			
Lisa Aitken; Kevin Moran	Mixed Doubles	J Chinappa (IND); H P Sandhu (IND); L 0-2	C Laing (CAY); J Kelly (CAY); W 2-0	—N/a	2 Q	J Duncalf (ENG); A Waller (ENG); L 0-2	Did no advance			

== Swimming ==
Team Scotland announced the majority of its 25-strong squad (15 men and 10 women) on 3 October 2017.

Two para-swimmers were added on 17 January 2018 and two swimmers were added on 14 February 2018.

Men

Athlete	Event	Heat		Semifinal		Final	
Athlete	Event	Time	Rank	Time	Rank	Time	Rank
Jack Thorpe	50 m freestyle	22.48	10 Q	22.49	11	Did not advance	
Kieran McGuckin	50 m freestyle	22.96	18	Did not advance			
Scott McLay	50 m freestyle	22.79	14 Q	22.55	12	Did not advance	
Jack Thorpe	100 m freestyle	49.82	15 Q	49.75	12	Did not advance	
Kieran McGuckin	100 m freestyle	50.02	18	Did not advance			
Duncan Scott	100 m freestyle	48.99	4 Q	48.72	4 Q	48.02	1st place, gold medalist(s)
Craig McLean	200 m freestyle	1:48.42	10	—N/a		Did not advance	
Stephen Milne	200 m freestyle	1:48.08	8 Q	—N/a		1:48.52	8
Duncan Scott	200 m freestyle	1:46.62	1 Q	—N/a		1:46.30	3rd place, bronze medalist(s)
Stephen Milne	400 m freestyle	3:51.65	7 Q	—N/a		3:55.01	8
Craig McNally	50 m backstroke	26.11	8 Q	26.00	8 Q	25.80	7
Craig McNally	100 m backstroke	56.19	11 Q	55.28	11	Did not advance	
Stephen Milne	200 m backstroke	2:04.45	16	—N/a		Did not advance	
Craig McNally	200 m backstroke	2:00.26	8 Q	—N/a		1:58.32	7
Craig Benson	50 m breaststroke	28.06	8 Q	28.00	9	Did not advance	
Euan Inglis	50 m breaststroke	27.84	6 Q	27.85	7 Q	28.03	7
Mark Campbell	50 m breaststroke	28.10	=9 Q	28.07	11	Did not advance	
Ross Murdoch	100 m breaststroke	1:00.92	6 Q	1:00.07	6 Q	59.89	5
Craig Benson	100 m breaststroke	1:01.63	8 Q	1:00.43	7 Q	1:00.42	6
Calum Tait	100 m breaststroke	1:02.61	12 Q	1:01.62	12	Did not advance	
Ross Murdoch	200 m breaststroke	2:08.77	1 Q	—N/a		2:08.32	2nd place, silver medalist(s)
Craig Benson	200 m breaststroke	2:12.13	8 Q	—N/a		2:10.09	6
Calum Tait	200 m breaststroke	2:10.83	5 Q	—N/a		2:11.67	7
Scott McLay	50 m butterfly	24.49	12 Q	24.49	13	Did not advance	
Sean Campsie	50 m butterfly	24.32	9 Q	24.48	12	Did not advance	
Sean Campsie	100 m butterfly	53.31	2 Q	53.40	6 Q	53.51	8
Duncan Scott	200 m butterfly	1:57.64	3 Q	—N/a		1:56.60	3rd place, bronze medalist(s)
Dan Wallace	200 m individual medley	2:00.21	3 Q	—N/a		1:59.85	6
Duncan Scott	200 m individual medley	2:00.44	4 Q	—N/a		1:57.86	2nd place, silver medalist(s)
Mark Szaranek	200 m individual medley	2:00.58	6 Q	—N/a		1:59.24	4
Mark Szaranek	400 m individual medley	4:18.47	3 Q	—N/a		4:13.72	2nd place, silver medalist(s)
Duncan Scott; Jack Thorpe; Kieran McGuckin; Stephen Milne; Craig McLean (heat); Scott McLay (heat); Dan Wallace (heat)	4 × 100 m freestyle relay	3:16.53	2 Q	—N/a		3:15.86	3rd place, bronze medalist(s)
Stephen Milne; Duncan Scott; Dan Wallace; Mark Szaranek	4 × 200 m freestyle relay	—N/a				7:09.89	3rd place, bronze medalist(s)
Craig McNally; Ross Murdoch; Mark Szaranek; Duncan Scott; Craig Benson (heat); Sean Campsie (heat); Jack Thorpe (heat); Stephen Milne (heat)	4 × 100 m medley relay	3:38.79	3 Q	—N/a		3:35.15	4

Women

Athlete	Event	Heat		Semifinal		Final	
Athlete	Event	Time	Rank	Time	Rank	Time	Rank
Lucy Hope	50 m freestyle	25.85	9 Q	25.87	9	Did not advance	
Lucy Hope	100 m freestyle	55.56	Q	55.43	10	Did not advance	
Toni Shaw	100 m freestyle S9	1:08.00	6 Q	—N/a		1:04.19	5
Lucy Hope	200 m freestyle	1:59.18	8 Q	—N/a		1:59.58	8
Camilla Hattersley	400 m freestyle	4:12.26	5 Q	—N/a		4:12.24	7
Abbie Houston	400 m freestyle	4:19.52	14	—N/a		Did not advance	
Hannah Miley	400 m freestyle	4:14.62	10	—N/a		Did not advance	
Camilla Hattersley	800 m freestyle	8:35.62	3 Q	—N/a		8:32.65	5
Kathleen Dawson	50 m backstroke	28.17	4 Q	28.26	5 Q	28.37	6
Lucy Hope	50 m backstroke	28.77	9 Q	28.31	7 Q	28.54	8
Cassie Wild	50 m backstroke	28.31	5 Q	28.29	6 Q	28.18	5
Kathleen Dawson	100 m backstroke	1:01.38	10 Q	1:00.67	8 Q	1:00.74	6
Cassie Wild	100 m backstroke	1:02.29	12 Q	1:00.93	10	Did not advance	
Toni Shaw	100 m backstroke S9	1:16.19	3 Q	—N/a		1:16.79	5
Corrie Scott	50 m breaststroke	31.48	9 Q	31.33	9	Did not advance	
Corrie Scott	100 m breaststroke	1:09.51	12 Q	1:09.32	12	Did not advance	
Toni Shaw	100 m breaststroke SB9	1:29.94	7 Q	—N/a		1:27.99	7
Hannah Miley	200 m breaststroke	2:28.01	8 Q	—N/a		Withdrew	
Keanna Macinnes	100 m butterfly	59.63	11 Q	59.55	11	Did not advance	
Keanna Macinnes	200 m butterfly	2:11.78	10	—N/a		Did not advance	
Hannah Miley	200 m butterfly	2:11.53	9	—N/a		Did not advance	
Hannah Miley	200 m individual medley	2:12.50	3 Q	—N/a		2:13.29	6
Beth Johnston	200 m individual medley SM10	2:51.60	9	—N/a		Did not advance	
Toni Shaw	200 m individual medley SM10	2:38.60	6 Q	—N/a		2:38.38	6
Hannah Miley	400 m individual medley	4:38.20	1 Q	—N/a		4:35.16	2nd place, silver medalist(s)
Lucy Hope; Camilla Hattersley; Abbie Houston; Hannah Miley	4 × 200 m freestyle relay	—N/a				8:01.55	4
Kathleen Dawson; Corrie Scott; Keanna Macinnes; Lucy Hope	4 × 100 m medley relay	—N/a				4:05.17	5

== Table tennis ==
Team Scotland announced its squad of 3 players (all men) on 17 January 2018.

Singles

Athletes	Event	Group Stage			Round of 64	Round of 32	Round of 16	Quarterfinal	Semifinal	Final	Rank
Athletes	Event	Opposition Score	Opposition Score	Rank	Opposition Score	Opposition Score	Opposition Score	Opposition Score	Opposition Score	Opposition Score	Rank
Colin Dalgleish	Men's singles	D Hukmani (BIZ); W 4–1	J Choong (MAS); L 1–4	2	Did not advance						
Craig Howieson	Men's singles	R Taucoory (MRI); W 4–0	M Dowell (BAR); W 4–0	1 Q	Bye	Gao N (SGP); L 0–4	Did not advance				
Gavin Rumgay	Men's singles	Bye				B Jayasingha (SRI); W 4–0	L Pitchford (ENG); L 0–4	Did not advance			

Doubles

Athletes	Event	Round of 64	Round of 32	Round of 16	Quarterfinal	Semifinal	Final	Rank
Athletes	Event	Opposition Score	Opposition Score	Opposition Score	Opposition Score	Opposition Score	Opposition Score	Rank
Craig Howieson; Gavin Rumgay	Men's doubles	Bye	O Cathcart & Z Wilson (NIR); W 3–0	D McBeath & S Walker (ENG); L 0–3	Did not advance			

Team

Athletes	Event	Group Stage			Round of 16	Quarterfinal	Semifinal	Final	Rank
Athletes	Event	Opposition Score	Opposition Score	Rank	Opposition Score	Opposition Score	Opposition Score	Opposition Score	Rank
Colin Dalgleish; Craig Howieson; Gavin Rumgay	Men's team	Australia; L 0–3	Kiribati; W 3–0	2 Q	Malaysia; L 1–3	Did not advance			

== Triathlon ==
Team Scotland announced the majority of its 5-strong squad (2 men and 3 women) on 30 November 2017. The fifth triathlete was announced on 17 January 2018.

Individual

Athlete	Event	Swim (750 m)	Trans 1	Bike (20 km)	Trans 2	Run (5 km)	Total	Rank
Marc Austin	Men's	8:53	0:35	27:39	0:25	15:12	52:44	3rd place, bronze medalist(s)
Grant Sheldon	Men's	9:09	0:37	29:19	0:28	16:09	55:42	17
Beth Potter	Women's	9:50	0:37	31:28	0:31	17:24	59:50	12

Mixed Relay

Athletes	Event	Total Times per Athlete (Swim 250 m, Bike 7 km, Run 1.5 km)	Total Group Time	Rank
Beth Potter; Marc Austin; Erin Wallace; Grant Sheldon	Mixed relay	20:59; 19:05; 22:02; 20:15	1:22:21	7

Paratriathlon

Athlete	Event	Comp.	Swim (250 m)	Trans 1	Bike (7 km)	Trans 2	Run (1.5 km)	Total	Rank
Karen Darke	Women's PTWC	0:00	17:53	1:55	38:56	1:02	16:51	1:16:37	4

== Weightlifting ==
Team Scotland announced its squad of 4 weightlifters (2 men and 2 women) on 30 November 2017.

A powerlifter was added on 17 January 2018.

Athlete	Event	Snatch		Clean & Jerk		Total	Rank
Athlete	Event	Result	Rank	Result	Rank	Total	Rank
Scott Wilson	Men's −94 kg	140	9	171	7	311	7
Zachary Courtney	Men's −105 kg	130	12	—	—	—	DNF
Lisa Tobias	Women's −48 kg	60	9	79	8	139	8
Jodey Hughes	Women's −58 kg	70	9	90	10	160	9

=== Powerlifting ===
Scotland participated with 1 athlete (1 man).

Athlete	Event	Result	Rank
Michael Yule	Men's heavyweight	169.9	4

== Wrestling ==
Team Scotland announced its squad of 4 wrestlers (all men) on 14 February 2018.

Men

Athlete	Event	Round of 16	Quarterfinal	Semifinal	Repechage	Final / BM	
Athlete	Event	Opposition Result	Opposition Result	Opposition Result	Opposition Result	Opposition Result	Rank
Ross Connelly	-57 kg	C Divoshan (SRI); L 6−12	Did not advance				
Viorel Etko	-57 kg	Bye	E Welson (NGR); L 0−10	Did not advance			
Oleg Gladkov	-74 kg	M A Butt (PAK); L 3−10	Did not advance				
Joe Hendry	-97 kg	N Verreynne (AUS); L 0−5	Did not advance				
