= Guernsey at the 2018 Commonwealth Games =

- Flag of Guernsey
- CG code: GGY
- CGA: Guernsey Commonwealth Games Association
- Website: guernseycga.org.gg

in Gold Coast, Australia 4 April 2018 – 15 April 2018
- Competitors: 31 in 8 sports
- Flag bearer: Matthew Guille
- Medals: Gold 0 Silver 0 Bronze 0 Total 0

Commonwealth Games appearances (overview)
- 1970; 1974; 1978; 1982; 1986; 1990; 1994; 1998; 2002; 2006; 2010; 2014; 2018; 2022; 2026; 2030

Guernsey competed at the 2018 Commonwealth Games in the Gold Coast, Australia from 4 April to 15 April 2018. Guernsey's team consisted of 31 athletes across eight sports. It was Guernsey's 13th appearance at the Commonwealth Games.

The first seven competitors were announced in September 2017. The final team members were announced on 24 November 2017. The overall team consisted of 24 men and seven women.

Sport shooter Matthew Guille was the island's flag bearer during the opening ceremony.

== Competitors ==
The following is the list of number of competitors participating at the Games per sport/discipline.

Spa hrvatska cgort	Men	Women	Total
Athletics (track and field)	3	1	4
Badminton	2	2	4
Boxing	1	0	1
Cycling	7	1	8
Lawn bowls	3	1	4
Shooting	5	1	6
Swimming	2	1	3
Triathlon	1	0	1
Total	24	7	31

== Athletics (track and field) ==
Guernsey's athletics team consisted of four athletes (three men and one woman).

Track & road events

Athlete	Event	Heat		Semifinal		Final	
Athlete	Event	Result	Rank	Result	Rank	Result	Rank
Cameron Chalmers	Men's 400 m	46.16	4 q	46.34	5	did not advance	
Alastair Chalmers	Men's 400 m hurdles	51.10	7	—N/a		did not advance	
Lee Merrien	Men's Marathon	—N/a				2:24:10	8
Sarah Mercier	Women's 5000 m	—N/a				17:00.52	16

== Badminton ==
Guernsey's badminton team consisted of four athletes (two men and two women).

Athlete	Event	Round of 64	Round of 32	Round of 16	Quarterfinal	Semifinal	Final / BM	
Athlete	Event	Opposition Score	Opposition Score	Opposition Score	Opposition Score	Opposition Score	Opposition Score	Rank
Chloe Le Tissier	Women's singles	Katherine Wynter (JAM); L 0 – 2	did not advance					
Elena Johnson; Chloe Le Tissier	Women's doubles	—N/a	Eyram Migbodzi (GHA); Stella Koteikai Amasah (GHA); W 2 – 0	Chloe Birch (ENG); Jessica Pugh (ENG); L 0 – 2	did not advance			
Elena Johnson; Jordan Trebert	Mixed doubles	Brian Yang (CAN); Michelle Li (CAN); L 0 – 2	did not advance					
Chloe Le Tissier; Stuart Hardy	Mixed doubles	Satwiksairaj Rankireddy (IND); Ashwini Ponnappa (IND); L 0 – 2	did not advance					

== Boxing ==
Guernsey's entered one boxer.

Men

Athlete	Event	Round of 32	Round of 16	Quarterfinals	Semifinals	Final	Rank
Athlete	Event	Opposition Result	Opposition Result	Opposition Result	Opposition Result	Opposition Result	Rank
Billy Le Poullain	−69 kg	Gul Zaib (PAK); L 2–3	did not advance				

== Cycling ==
Guernsey's cycling team consisted of eight athletes (seven men and one woman).

=== Road ===
Men

Athlete	Event	Time	Rank
Jack English	Road race	3:59:25	33
Tobyn Horton	Road race	3:57:01	7
James McLaughlin	Road race	3:59:11	29
James Roe	Road race	DNF	
Michael Serafin	Road race	DNF	
Sebastian Tremlett	Road race	DNF	
Jack English	Time trial	53:07.65	17
James McLaughlin	Time trial	49:54.12	6
Sebastian Tremlett	Time trial	52:10.73	12

Women

Athlete	Event	Time	Rank
Karina Jackson	Road race	DNF	
Karina Jackson	Time trial	42:36.36	17

=== Mountain bike ===
Athlete	Event	Time	Rank
Andrew Colver	Men's cross-country	-3LAP	21
James Roe	Men's cross-country	1:27:06	13
Michael Serafin	Men's cross-country	-1LAP	16

== Lawn bowls ==
Guernsey's lawn bowls team consisted of four athletes (three men and one woman).

Athlete	Event	Group Stage						Quarterfinal	Semifinal	Final / BM	
Athlete	Event	Opposition Score	Opposition Score	Opposition Score	Opposition Score	Opposition Score	Rank	Opposition Score	Opposition Score	Opposition Score	Rank
Todd Priaulx	Men's Singles	Rusli (MAS); L 11 – 21	Bell (SAM); W 21 – 3	Burnett (SCO); L 13 – 21	Tagelagi (NIU); W 21 – 7	Omar (BRU); W 21 – 20	3	did not advance			
Matthew Le Ber; Matthew Solway	Men's Pairs	Canada; L 14 – 16	Malta; L 10 – 16	Australia; L 15 – 18	Brunei; W 20 – 12	—N/a	4	did not advance			
Lucy Beere	Women's Singles	Daniels (WAL); L 15 – 21	MacDonald (JER); W 21 – 12	Brown (SCO); L 6 – 21	Matali (BRU); L 17 – 21	—N/a	4	did not advance			

== Shooting ==
Guernsey's entered six shooters (five men and one woman).

Men

Athlete	Event	Qualification		Final	
Athlete	Event	Points	Rank	Points	Rank
Matthew Guille	50 metre rifle prone	601.7	24	did not advance	
Darren Burtenshaw	Trap	102	30	did not advance	
Stefan Roberts	Trap	108	21	did not advance	

Women

Athlete	Event	Qualification		Final	
Athlete	Event	Points	Rank	Points	Rank
Nikki Trebert	25 metre pistol	545	12	did not advance	
Nikki Trebert	10 metre air pistol	360	16	did not advance	

Open

Athlete	Event	Day 1		Day 2		Day 3		Total	
Athlete	Event	Points	Rank	Points	Rank	Points	Rank	Overall	Rank
Adam Jory	Queen's prize individual	104-6v	14	148-12v	15	143-8v	23	395-26v	19
Peter Jory	Queen's prize individual	103-9v	19	149-18v	8	147-10v	14	399–37	14
Adam Jory; Peter Jory	Queen's prize pairs	294.30v	10	281-15v	9	—N/a		575-45v	9

== Swimming ==
Guernsey's entered three swimmers (two men and one woman).

Men

Athlete	Event	Heat		Semifinal		Final	
Athlete	Event	Time	Rank	Time	Rank	Time	Rank
Thomas Hollingsworth	50 m backstroke	26.78	10 Q	27.08	11	did not advance	
Thomas Hollingsworth	100 m backstroke	57.61	16 Q	58.14	16	did not advance	
Miles Munro	50 m freestyle	22.94	17	did not advance			
Miles Munro	100 m freestyle	50.80	26	did not advance			
Miles Munro	50 m butterfly	24.76	17	did not advance			

Women

Athlete	Event	Heat		Semifinal		Final	
Athlete	Event	Time	Rank	Time	Rank	Time	Rank
Tatiana Tostevin	50 m freestyle	27.52	23	did not advance			
Tatiana Tostevin	100 m freestyle	1:00.31	25	did not advance			
Tatiana Tostevin	50 m backstroke	30.19	20	did not advance			
Tatiana Tostevin	100 m backstroke	1:04.90	19	did not advance			

== Triathlon ==
Guernsey's entered one triathlete.

Individual

Athlete	Event	Swim (750 m)	Trans 1	Bike (20 km)	Trans 2	Run (5 km)	Total	Rank
Joshua Lewis	Men's	9:31	0:45	30:29	0:30	17:30	58:45	24
