= Lawn bowls at the 2018 Commonwealth Games – Women's singles =

Lawn bowls women's singles at the 2018 Commonwealth Games
- Venue: Broadbeach Bowls Club
- Dates: 5–8 April 2018
- Competitors: 22 from 22 nations

Medalists
gold medal	Jo Edwards	New Zealand
silver medal	Laura Daniels	Wales
bronze medal	Colleen Piketh	South Africa

Lawn bowls women's singles at the 2018 Commonwealth Games was held at the Broadbeach Bowls Club in the Gold Coast, Australia from 5 to 8 April. A total of 22 athletes from 22 associations participated in the event. New Zealand's Jo Edwards won the gold medal, defeating Laura Daniels of Wales in the final. Colleen Piketh from South Africa won the bronze medal.

== Sectional play ==
The top two from each section advance to the knockout stage.

=== Section A ===
Rank	Athlete	MP	MW	MT	ML	FR	AG	PD	PTS
1	Karen Murphy (AUS)	4	4	0	0	84	40	44	12
2	Colleen Piketh (RSA)	4	3	0	1	79	47	32	9
3	Catherine Beattie (NIR)	4	2	0	2	72	69	3	6
4	Malia Kioa (TGA)	4	1	0	3	42	73	-31	3
5	Getrude Siame (ZAM)	4	0	0	4	36	84	-48	0

	Australia	South Africa	Northern Ireland	Tonga	Zambia
Australia	—	21–16	21–17	21–4	21–3
South Africa	16–21	—	21–13	21–4	21–9
Northern Ireland	17–21	13–21	—	21–13	21–14
Tonga	4–21	4–21	13–21	—	21–10
Zambia	3–21	9–21	14–21	10–21	—

=== Section B ===
Rank	Athlete	MP	MW	MT	ML	FR	AG	PD	PTS
1	Caroline Brown (SCO)	4	4	0	0	84	44	40	12
2	Laura Daniels (WAL)	4	3	0	1	76	57	19	9
3	Amalia Matali (BRU)	4	2	0	2	64	73	-9	6
4	Lucy Beere (GUE)	4	1	0	3	59	75	-16	3
5	Rachel MacDonald (JER)	4	0	0	4	50	84	-34	0

	Scotland	Wales	Brunei	Guernsey	Jersey
Scotland	—	21–13	21–12	21–6	21–13
Wales	13–21	—	21–10	21–15	21–11
Brunei	10–21	12–21	—	21–17	21–14
Guernsey	6–21	15–21	17–21	—	21–12
Jersey	13–21	11–21	14–21	12–21	—

=== Section C ===
Rank	Athlete	MP	MW	MT	ML	FR	AG	PD	PTS
1	Carmen Anderson (NFI)	5	5	0	0	105	63	42	15
2	Kelly McKerihen (CAN)	5	4	0	1	103	61	42	12
3	Catherine Wimp (PNG)	5	2	0	3	82	79	3	6
4	Eunice Mbugua (KEN)	5	2	0	3	77	86	-9	6
5	Nooroa Mataio (COK)	5	2	0	3	63	99	-36	6
6	Nelly Senna (BOT)	5	0	0	5	63	105	-42	0

	Norfolk Island	Canada	Papua New Guinea	Kenya	Cook Islands	Botswana
Norfolk Island	—	21–19	21–11	21–7	21–9	21–17
Canada	19–21	—	21–14	21–10	21–7	21–9
Papua New Guinea	11–21	14–21	—	15–21	21–7	21–9
Kenya	7–21	10–21	21–15	—	18–19	21–10
Cook Islands	9–21	7–21	7–21	19–18	—	21–18
Botswana	17–21	9–21	9–21	10–21	18–21	—

=== Section D ===
Rank	Athlete	MP	MW	MT	ML	FR	AG	PD	PTS
1	Jo Edwards (NZL)	5	4	0	1	100	65	35	12
2	Emma Firyana (MAS)	5	4	0	1	90	65	25	12
3	Katherine Rednall (ENG)	5	3	0	2	94	79	15	9
4	Litia Tikoisuva (FIJ)	5	3	0	2	92	82	10	9
5	Pinki Singh (IND)	5	1	0	4	69	92	-23	3
6	Pau Blumsky (NIU)	5	0	0	5	43	105	-62	0

	New Zealand	Malaysia	England	Fiji	India	Niue
New Zealand	—	21–7	17–21	21–10	20–16	21–11
Malaysia	7–21	—	21–11	20–19	21–9	21–5
England	21–17	11–21	—	20–21	21–11	21–9
Fiji	10–21	19–20	21–20	—	21–12	21–9
India	16–20	9–21	11–21	12–21	—	21–9
Niue	11–21	5–21	9–21	9–21	9–21	—

== Knockout stage ==
Quarterfinal
A1	Karen Murphy (AUS)	19
A2	Colleen Piketh (RSA)	21
D1	Jo Edwards (NZL)	21
D2	Emma Firyana (MAS)	9
B1	Caroline Brown (SCO)	12
C2	Kelly McKerihen (CAN)	21
C1	Carmen Anderson (NFI)	13
B2	Laura Daniels (WAL)	21

Semifinal
A2	Colleen Piketh (RSA)	17
D1	Jo Edwards (NZL)	21
C2	Kelly McKerihen (CAN)	13
B2	Laura Daniels (WAL)	21

Finals
D1	Jo Edwards (NZL)	21
B2	Laura Daniels (WAL)	17
Third place
A2	Colleen Piketh (RSA)	21
C2	Kelly McKerihen (CAN)	17
