= Badminton at the 2018 Commonwealth Games – Women's doubles =

Badminton – Women's doubles at the 2018 Commonwealth Games
- Venue: Carrara Sports and Leisure Centre, Gold Coast
- Dates: 10–15 April

Medalists
gold medal	Chow Mei Kuan; Vivian Hoo	Malaysia
silver medal	Lauren Smith; Sarah Walker	England
bronze medal	Ashwini Ponnappa; N. Sikki Reddy	India

The women's doubles badminton event at the 2018 Commonwealth Games was held from 10 to 15 April 2018 at the Carrara Sports and Leisure Centre on the Gold Coast, Australia. The defending gold medalists were Vivian Hoo and Woon Khe Wei of Malaysia. Woon did not play in this tournament, pushing Hoo to play alongside Chow Mei Kuan.

The athletes were drawn into straight knockout stage. The draw for the competition was conducted on 2 April 2018.

== Seeds ==
The seeds for the tournament were:

1. Setyana Mapasa / Gronya Somerville (AUS) (fourth place)
2. Ashwini Ponnappa / N. Sikki Reddy (IND) (bronze medalists)

3. Lauren Smith / Sarah Walker (ENG) (silver medalists)
4. Chloe Birch / Jessica Pugh (ENG) (quarter-finals)

Click on the seed number of a player to go to their draw section.

== Results ==
=== Finals ===
Semi-finals
1	Setyana Mapasa (AUS); Gronya Somerville (AUS)	15	15
3	Lauren Smith (ENG); Sarah Walker (ENG)	21	21
Chow Mei Kuan (MAS); Vivian Hoo (MAS)	17	21	21
2	Ashwini Ponnappa (IND); N. Sikki Reddy (IND)	21	15	4

Gold medal match
3	Lauren Smith (ENG); Sarah Walker (ENG)	12	12
Chow Mei Kuan (MAS); Vivian Hoo (MAS)	21	21
Bronze medal match
1	Setyana Mapasa (AUS); Gronya Somerville (AUS)	19	19
2	Ashwini Ponnappa (IND); N. Sikki Reddy (IND)	21	21

=== Top half ===
==== Section 1 ====
Round of 32
Alissa Dean (FIJ); Danielle Whiteside (FIJ)	21	18	21
Alana Bailey (JAM); Katherine Wynter (JAM)	18	21	17
Elise Dixon (JER); Emily Temple Redshaw (JER)	9	10
Sinead Chambers (NIR); Rachael Darragh (NIR)	21	21
Soniia Cheah (MAS); Shevon Jemie Lai (MAS)	21	21
Grace Atipaka (GHA); Gifty Mensah (GHA)	8	4

Round of 16
1	Setyana Mapasa (AUS); Gronya Somerville (AUS)	21	21
Alissa Dean (FIJ); Danielle Whiteside (FIJ)	3	6
Sinead Chambers (NIR); Rachael Darragh (NIR)	19	7
Soniia Cheah (MAS); Shevon Jemie Lai (MAS)	21	21

Quarter-finals
1	Setyana Mapasa (AUS); Gronya Somerville (AUS)	21	21
Soniia Cheah (MAS); Shevon Jemie Lai (MAS)	15	16

==== Section 2 ====
Round of 32
Juliette Ah-Wan (SEY); Allisen Camille (SEY)	10	10
Julie MacPherson (SCO); Eleanor O'Donnell (SCO)	21	21
Zoe Morris (FAI); Cheryl March (FAI)	3	5
Michelle Butler-Emmett (RSA); Elsie de Villiers (RSA)	21	21
Palwasha Bashir (PAK); Mahoor Shahzad (PAK)	6	15
Thilini Hendahewa (SRI); Kavidi Sirimannage (SRI)	21	21

Round of 16
3	Lauren Smith (ENG); Sarah Walker (ENG)	21	21
Julie MacPherson (SCO); Eleanor O'Donnell (SCO)	13	10
Michelle Butler-Emmett (RSA); Elsie de Villiers (RSA)	9	9
Thilini Hendahewa (SRI); Kavidi Sirimannage (SRI)	21	21

Quarter-finals
3	Lauren Smith (ENG); Sarah Walker (ENG)	21	21
Thilini Hendahewa (SRI); Kavidi Sirimannage (SRI)	12	16

=== Bottom half ===
==== Section 3 ====
Round of 32
Rachel Honderich (CAN); Kristen Tsai (CAN)	21	21
Karyn Gibsoon (FIJ); Andra Whiteside (FIJ)	4	7
Chow Mei Kuan (MAS); Vivian Hoo (MAS)	21	21
Everlyn Siamupangila (ZAM); Ogar Siamupangila (ZAM)	3	6
Elena Johnson (GUE); Chloe le Tissier (GUE)	21	21
Eyram Migbodzi (GHA); Stella Koteikai Amasah (GHA)	10	14

Round of 16
Rachel Honderich (CAN); Kristen Tsai (CAN)	17	16
Chow Mei Kuan (MAS); Vivian Hoo (MAS)	21	21
Elena Johnson (GUE); Chloe le Tissier (GUE)	5	9
4	Chloe Birch (ENG); Jessica Pugh (ENG)	21	21

Quarter-finals
Chow Mei Kuan (MAS); Vivian Hoo (MAS)	21	21
4	Chloe Birch (ENG); Jessica Pugh (ENG)	11	6

==== Section 4 ====
Round of 32
Hasini Ambalangodage (SRI); Madushika Dilrukshi Beruwelage (SRI)	21	21
Kimberley Clague (IOM); Cristen Marritt (IOM)	13	19
Shamim Bangi (UGA); Aisha Nakiyemba (UGA)
Aurélie Allet (MRI); Nicki Chan-Lam (MRI)	w	/	o
Renuga Veeran (AUS); Leanne Choo (AUS)	20	21	18
Ren-ne Ong (SGP); Crystal Wong (SGP)	22	16	21

Round of 16
Hasini Ambalangodage (SRI); Madushika Dilrukshi Beruwelage (SRI)	21	21
Aurélie Allet (MRI); Nicki Chan-Lam (MRI)	6	9
Ren-ne Ong (SGP); Crystal Wong (SGP)	18	13
2	Ashwini Ponnappa (IND); N. Sikki Reddy (IND)	21	21

Quarter-finals
Hasini Ambalangodage (SRI); Madushika Dilrukshi Beruwelage (SRI)	11	13
2	Ashwini Ponnappa (IND); N. Sikki Reddy (IND)	21	21
