= Shooting at the 2018 Commonwealth Games – Women's 25 metre pistol =

Shooting – Women's 25 metre pistol at the 2018 Commonwealth Games
- Venue: Belmont Shooting Centre, Brisbane
- Dates: 10 April 2018
- Competitors: 14 from 10 nations

Medalists
gold medal	Heena Sidhu	India
silver medal	Elena Galiabovitch	Australia
bronze medal	Alia Sazana Azahari	Malaysia

The Women's 25 metre air pistol took place on 10 April 2018 at the Belmont Shooting Centre, Brisbane. There was a qualification in which the top 8 athletes qualified for the finals.

== Results ==
=== Qualification ===
Rank	Athlete	Stage 1 (Precision)					Stage 2 (Rapid)					Total	Notes
Rank	Athlete	1	2	ex 200	3	Result	1	2	ex 200	3	Result	Total	Notes
1	Xiu Hong Teh (SIN)	96	97	193	98	291-9x	96	100	196	97	293-8x	584-17x	QF
2	Annu Singh (IND)	96	99	195	98	293-7x	98	96	194	97	291-6x	584-13x	QF
3	Heena Sidhu (IND)	95	93	188	98	286-9x	95	99	194	99	293-12x	579-21x	QF
4	Elena Galiabovitch (AUS)	90	97	187	94	281-3x	98	97	195	96	291-12x	572-15x	QF
5	Lalita Yauhleuskaya (AUS)	95	97	192	94	286-10x	95	94	189	96	285-11x	571-21x	QF
6	Alia Sazana Azahari (MAS)	93	96	189	92	281-6x	96	97	193	97	290-12x	571-18x	QF
7	Eleanor Bezzina (MLT)	97	92	189	98	287-7x	94	97	191	93	284-11x	571-18x	QF
8	Bibiana Pei Chin Ng (MAS)	95	96	191	96	287-9x	94	95	189	93	282-7x	569-16x	QF
9	Ling Chiao Nicole Tan (SIN)	94	95	189	97	286-6x	97	98	195	88	283-8x	569-14x	
10	Jessica Liddon (SCO)	96	98	194	94	288-7x	92	92	184	90	274-4x	562-11x	
11	Mehwish Farhan (PAK)	93	95	188	92	280-7x	93	91	184	95	279-5x	559-12x	
12	Nikki Trebert (GUE)	89	91	180	94	274-5x	88	90	178	93	271-3x	545-8x	
13	Nicola Holmes (JER)	96	94	190	92	282-8x	75	94	169	93	262-4x	544-12x	
14	Jacqueline Grundy (NFI)	84	88	172	85	257-2x	75	77	152	63	215-0x	472-2x	

=== Finals ===
Rank	Name	1	2	1-2	3	1-3	4	1-4	5	1-5	6	1-6	7	1-7	8	1-8	9	1-9	10	1-10	Points	Notes
1st place, gold medalist(s)	Heena Sidhu (IND)	3	4	7	3	10	3	13	5	18	5	23	4	27	4	31	3	34	4	38	38	GR
2nd place, silver medalist(s)	Elena Galiabovitch (AUS)	4	5	9	4	13	3	16	4	20	3	23	2	25	3	28	4	32	3	35	35	
3rd place, bronze medalist(s)	Alia Sazana Azahari (MAS)	3	3	6	3	9	3	12	4	16	4	18	4	22	2	24	2	26			26	
4	Eleanor Bezzina (MLT)	2	3	5	3	8	4	12	2	14	4	18	1	19	3	22					22	
5	Xiu Hong Teh (SIN)	2	3	5	2	7	5	12	3	15	3	18	1	19							19	SO
6	Annu Singh (IND)	2	3	5	3	8	3	11	2	13	2	15									15	
7	Bibiana Pei Chin Ng (MAS)	3	4	7	3	10	2	12	0	12											12	
8	Lalita Yauhleuskaya (AUS)	1	2	3	1	4	3	7													7	

Key

- QF = Qualified for Finals
- GR = Games record
- SO = Athlete eliminated by Shoot-off for tie
