= Shooting at the 2018 Commonwealth Games – Women's 10 metre air pistol =

Sporting event

Women's 10 metre air pistol at the 2018 Commonwealth Games
- Venue: Belmont Shooting Centre, Brisbane
- Dates: 8 April
- Competitors: 25 from 18 nations

Medalists
gold medal	Manu Bhaker	India
silver medal	Heena Sidhu	India
bronze medal	Elena Galiabovitch	Australia

The Women's 10 metre air pistol event at the 2018 Commonwealth Games was held on 8 April at the Belmont Shooting Centre, Brisbane.

== Results ==
=== Qualification ===
Each shooter fired at the target 40 times. The top eight shooters advanced to the final.

Rank	Name	1	2	ex 200	3	ex 300	4	Total	Notes
1	Manu Bhaker (IND)	98	98	196	96	292	96	388-10x	Q, QGR
2	Heena Sidhu (IND)	94	96	190	93	283	96	379-6x	Q
3	Eleanor Bezzina (MLT)	94	94	188	95	283	95	378-6x	Q
4	Teo Shun Xie (SGP)	97	92	189	95	284	93	377-10x	Q
5	Elena Galiabovitch (AUS)	94	96	190	94	284	92	376-10x	Q
6	Mehwish Farhan (PAK)	95	93	188	95	283	92	375-7x	Q
7	Coral Kennerley (WAL)	95	93	188	94	282	92	374-7x	Q
8	Xiu Hong Teh (SGP)	91	93	184	93	277	96	373-13x	Q
9	Ardina Ferdous (BAN)	93	96	189	92	282	92	373-5x	
10	Lalita Yauhleuskaya (AUS)	92	91	183	95	278	93	371-9x	
11	Bibiana Ng (MAS)	93	92	185	91	276	94	370-4x	
12	Victoria Mullin (ENG)	92	94	186	91	277	91	368-12x	
13	Jessica Liddon (SCO)	93	88	181	93	274	88	362-5x	
14	Nicola Holmes (JER)	93	90	183	91	274	87	361-6x	
15	Panagiota Charalampous (CYP)	91	92	183	86	269	91	360-5x	
16	Nikki Trebert (GUE)	85	90	175	94	269	91	360-1x	
17	Armin Asha (BAN)	96	93	189	87	276	83	359-7x	
18	Caroline Brownlie (SCO)	90	92	182	89	271	88	359-5x	
19	Linet Owiti (KEN)	89	86	175	87	262	88	350-4x	
20	Jacqueline Grundy (NFI)	83	83	166	90	256	88	344-3x	
21	Marrianne Cherotich (KEN)	74	87	161	85	246	83	329-3x	
22	Tansie Bonner (FAI)	79	85	164	81	245	82	327-5x	
23	Charlotte-Anne Middleton (FAI)	85	81	166	80	246	80	326-2x	
24	Tania Mairi (PNG)	83	84	167	78	245	79	324-2x	
25	Latoya Rigby (TCI)	76	79	155	66	221	71	292-0x	

=== Final ===
In the first competition stage, each shooter fired at the target 10 times. Their aggregate scores were carried over to the second competition stage, in which the lowest-ranked shooter was eliminated for every two shots taken.

Rank	Name	1st Stage			2nd Stage (Elimination)														Total	Notes
Rank	Name	1	2	1-2	3	1-3	4	1-4	5	1-5	6	1-6	7	1-7	8	1-8	9	1-9	Total	Notes
1st place, gold medalist(s)	Manu Bhaker (IND)	50.9	50.6	101.5	19.5	121.0	20.5	141.5	18.4	159.9	20.3	180.2	21.5	201.7	19.0	220.7	20.2	240.9	240.9	FGR
2nd place, silver medalist(s)	Heena Sidhu (IND)	46.1	49.4	95.5	19.8	115.3	19.6	134.9	20.4	155.3	20.0	175.3	19.7	195.0	20.2	215.2	18.8	234.0	234.0	
3rd place, bronze medalist(s)	Elena Galiabovitch (AUS)	49.4	49.4	98.8	17.8	116.6	20.7	137.3	19.8	157.1	18.4	175.5	19.5	195.0	19.9	214.9	-	-	214.9	
4	Eleanor Bezzina (MLT)	48.5	49.1	97.6	19.7	117.3	19.5	136.8	19.2	156.0	18.4	174.4	18.8	193.2	-	-	-	-	193.2	
5	Coral Kennerley (WAL)	47.3	48.4	95.7	20.4	116.1	19.3	135.4	20.3	155.7	18.3	174.0	-	-	-	-	-	-	174.0	
6	Xiu Hong Teh (SGP)	48.1	49.3	97.4	20.3	117.7	18.8	136.5	18.3	154.8	-	-	-	-	-	-	-	-	154.8	
7	Teo Shun Xie (SGP)	47.6	47.7	95.3	19.5	114.8	19.1	133.9	-	-	-	-	-	-	-	-	-	-	133.9	
8	Mehwish Farhan (PAK)	45.9	47.8	93.7	18.4	112.1	-	-	-	-	-	-	-	-	-	-	-	-	112.1	
