= Cycling at the 2018 Commonwealth Games – Men's cross-country =

Cycling – Men's cross-country at the 2018 Commonwealth Games
- Venue: Nerang National Park
- Dates: 12 April
- Competitors: 21 from 14 nations
- Winning time: 1:17:36

Medalists
gold medal	Sam Gaze	New Zealand
silver medal	Anton Cooper	New Zealand
bronze medal	Alan Hatherly	South Africa

The men's cross country mountain biking competition at the 2018 Commonwealth Games in Gold Coast, Australia was held on 12 April in the Nerang National Park.

== Schedule ==
The schedule was as follows:

Date	Time	Round
Thursday 12 April 2018	13:31	Race

All times are Australian Eastern Standard Time (UTC+10)

== Results ==
The results were as follows:

Rank	Name	Time	Behind
1st place, gold medalist(s)	Sam Gaze (NZL)	1:17:36	–
2nd place, silver medalist(s)	Anton Cooper (NZL)	1:17:36	+0:00
3rd place, bronze medalist(s)	Alan Hatherly (RSA)	1:17:56	+0:20
4	Ben Oliver (NZL)	1:18:41	+1:05
5	Frazer Clacherty (ENG)	1:19:14	+1:38
6	Léandre Bouchard (CAN)	1:19:15	+1:39
7	Daniel McConnell (AUS)	1:19:59	+2:23
8	Cameron Orr (NIR)	1:20:06	+2:30
9	Grant Ferguson (SCO)	1:22:29	+4:53
10	Nicholas Corlett (IOM)	1:26:20	+8:44
11	Dylan Kerfoot-Robson (WAL)	1:26:37	+9:01
12	Tristan de Lange (NAM)	1:26:59	+9:23
13	James Roe (GGY)	1:27:06	+9:30
14	Rhys Hidrio (JEY)	1:27:42	+10:06
15	Andreas Miltiadis (CYP)	1:28:18	+10:42
16	Michael Serafin (GGY)	-1LAP	–
17	Marc Potts (NIR)	-2LAP	–
18	Phetetso Monese (LES)	-2LAP	–
19	Tumelo Makae (LES)	-2LAP	–
20	Oliver Lowthorpe (JEY)	-3LAP	–
21	Andrew Colver (GGY)	-3LAP	–
