= Cycling at the 2018 Commonwealth Games – Women's road time trial =

Cycling – Women's road time trial at the 2018 Commonwealth Games
- Venue: Currumbin Beachfront
- Dates: 10 April
- Competitors: 19 from 13 nations
- Winning time: 35:08.09

Medalists
gold medal	Katrin Garfoot	Australia
silver medal	Linda Villumsen	New Zealand
bronze medal	Hayley Simmonds	England

The women's road time trial at the 2018 Commonwealth Games in Gold Coast, Australia was held on 10 April along the Currumbin Beachfront.

== Schedule ==
The schedule was as follows:

Date	Time	Round
Tuesday 10 April 2018	14:45	Race

All times are Australian Eastern Standard Time (UTC+10)

== Results ==
The results were as follows:

Rank	Name	Time	Behind
1st place, gold medalist(s)	Katrin Garfoot (AUS)	35:08.09	–
2nd place, silver medalist(s)	Linda Villumsen (NZL)	36:03.01	+54.92
3rd place, bronze medalist(s)	Hayley Simmonds (ENG)	36:22.09	+1:14.00
4	Katie Archibald (SCO)	37:07.38	+1:59.29
5	Rushlee Buchanan (NZL)	37:39.28	+2:31.19
6	Antri Christoforou (CYP)	38:01.11	+2:53.02
7	Annie Foreman-Mackey (CAN)	38:59.91	+3:51.82
8	Neah Evans (SCO)	39:23.90	+4:15.81
9	Anna Christian (IOM)	39:28.87	+4:20.78
10	Elizabeth Holden (IOM)	40:07.94	+4:59.85
11	Eileen Burns (NIR)	40:21.53	+5:13.44
12	Aurelie Halbwachs (MRI)	40:23.21	+5:15.12
13	Ariane Bonhomme (CAN)	40:37.40	+5:29.31
14	Stephanie Roorda (CAN)	41:08.33	+6:00.24
15	Kimberley Ashton (JEY)	41:26.07	+6:17.98
16	Vera Adrian (NAM)	42:26.14	+7:18.05
17	Karina Jackson (GGY)	42:36.36	+7:28.27
18	Helen Ralston (JEY)	43:01.12	+7:53.03
19	Alicia Thompson (BIZ)	47:03.89	+11:55.80
