= Swimming at the 2018 Commonwealth Games – Men's 100 metre backstroke =

Men's 100 metre backstroke at the 2018 Commonwealth Games
- Venue: Gold Coast Aquatic Centre
- Dates: 5 April (heats, semifinals); 6 April (final)
- Competitors: 24 from 20 nations
- Winning time: 53.18

Medalists
gold medal	Mitch Larkin	Australia
silver medal	Bradley Woodward	Australia
bronze medal	Markus Thormeyer	Canada

The men's 100 metre backstroke event at the 2018 Commonwealth Games was held on 5 and 6 April at the Gold Coast Aquatic Centre.

== Records ==
Prior to this competition, the existing world, Commonwealth and Games records were as follows:

World record	Ryan Murphy (USA)	51.85	Rio de Janeiro, Brazil	13 August 2016
Commonwealth record	Mitch Larkin (AUS)	52.11	Dubai, United Arab Emirates	6 November 2015
Games record	Chris Walker-Hebborn (ENG)	53.12	Glasgow, United Kingdom	25 July 2014

== Schedule ==
The schedule is as follows:

All times are Australian Eastern Standard Time (UTC+10)

Date	Time	Round
Thursday 5 April 2018	11:47	Qualifying
Thursday 5 April 2018	21:22	Semifinals
Friday 6 April 2018	21:36	Final

== Results ==
=== Heats ===
Rank	Heat	Lane	Name	Nationality	Time	Notes
1	3	4	Mitch Larkin	Australia	54.02	Q
2	3	3	Luke Greenbank	England	54.62	Q
3	3	5	Bradley Woodward	Australia	54.71	Q
4	2	4	Corey Main	New Zealand	54.99	Q
5	1	3	Elliot Clogg	England	55.08	Q
6	2	3	Markus Thormeyer	Canada	55.26	Q
7	1	4	Ben Treffers	Australia	55.30	Q
8	1	5	Xavier Castelli	Wales	55.51	Q
9	2	5	Conor Ferguson	Northern Ireland	55.54	Q
10	2	6	Calvyn Justus	South Africa	55.69	Q
11	3	6	Craig McNally	Scotland	56.19	Q
12	1	6	Martin Binedell	South Africa	56.37	Q
13	3	7	Harry Shalamon	Jersey	56.41	Q
14	2	7	Jason Arthur	Ghana	56.52	Q
15	1	2	Srihari Nataraj	India	56.71	Q
16	1	7	Thomas Hollingsworth	Guernsey	57.61	Q
17	3	2	Jian Han Tern	Malaysia	58.10	
18	2	2	Akalanka Peiris	Sri Lanka	58.68	
19	2	1	Syed Muhammad Haseeb Tariq	Pakistan	59.39	
20	1	1	Erico Cuna	Mozambique	1:01.27	
21	3	8	Jordan Gonzalez	Gibraltar	1:01.38	
22	3	1	Steven Maina	Kenya	1:01.65	
23	2	8	Cruz Halbich	Saint Vincent and the Grenadines	1:08.08	
24	1	8	Joshua Yon	Saint Helena	1:13.01	

=== Semifinals ===
Rank	Heat	Lane	Name	Nationality	Time	Notes
1	2	4	Mitch Larkin	Australia	53.15	Q
2	1	3	Markus Thormeyer	Canada	53.86	Q
3	2	5	Bradley Woodward	Australia	54.22	Q
4	2	2	Conor Ferguson	Northern Ireland	54.48	Q
5	1	4	Luke Greenbank	England	54.54	Q
6	2	6	Ben Treffers	Australia	54.62	Q
7	1	5	Corey Main	New Zealand	55.02	Q
8	1	6	Xavier Castelli	Wales	55.13	Q
9	1	7	Martin Binedell	South Africa	55.25	
9	1	2	Calvyn Justus	South Africa	55.25	
11	2	7	Craig McNally	Scotland	55.28	
12	2	3	Elliot Clogg	England	55.42	
13	2	1	Harry Shalamon	Jersey	56.47	
14	2	8	Srihari Nataraj	India	56.65	
15	1	1	Jason Arthur	Ghana	56.85	
16	1	8	Thomas Hollingsworth	Guernsey	58.14	

=== Final ===
Rank	Lane	Name	Nationality	Time	Notes
1st place, gold medalist(s)	4	Mitch Larkin	Australia	53.18	
2nd place, silver medalist(s)	3	Bradley Woodward	Australia	53.95	
3rd place, bronze medalist(s)	5	Markus Thormeyer	Canada	54.14	
4	2	Luke Greenbank	England	54.37	
5	8	Xavier Castelli	Wales	54.60	
6	7	Ben Treffers	Australia	54.62	
7	1	Corey Main	New Zealand	54.88	
8	6	Conor Ferguson	Northern Ireland	55.01	
