= Swimming at the 2018 Commonwealth Games – Men's 50 metre backstroke =

Men's 50 metre backstroke at the 2018 Commonwealth Games
- Venue: Gold Coast Aquatic Centre
- Dates: 7 April (heats, semifinals); 8 April (final)
- Competitors: 20 from 17 nations
- Winning time: 24.68

Medalists
gold medal	Mitch Larkin	Australia
silver medal	Ben Treffers	Australia
bronze medal	Zac Incerti	Australia

The men's 50 metre backstroke event at the 2018 Commonwealth Games was held on 7 and 8 April at the Gold Coast Aquatic Centre.

== Records ==
Prior to this competition, the existing world, Commonwealth and Games records were as follows:

Record	Time	Athlete (nation)	Meet	Location	Date	Ref
World record	24.04	Liam Tancock (GBR)		Rome, Italy	2 August 2009	
Commonwealth record	24.04	Liam Tancock (GBR)		Rome, Italy	2 August 2009	
Games record	24.62	Liam Tancock (ENG)		Delhi, India	5 October 2010	

== Results ==
=== Heats ===
The heats were held on 7 April at 11:15.

Rank	Heat	Lane	Name	Nationality	Time	Notes
1	2	4	Zac Incerti	Australia	25.05	Q
2	1	4	Mitch Larkin	Australia	25.32	Q
3	3	4	Ben Treffers	Australia	25.52	Q
4	3	5	Conor Ferguson	Northern Ireland	25.79	Q
5	3	3	Jian Han Tern	Malaysia	25.83	Q
6	1	5	Xavier Castelli	Wales	25.91	Q
7	2	6	Harry Shalamon	Jersey	26.08	Q
8	2	5	Craig McNally	Scotland	26.11	Q
9	1	3	Srihari Nataraj	India	26.47	Q
10	3	6	Thomas Hollingsworth	Guernsey	26.78	Q
11	2	3	Akalanka Peiris	Sri Lanka	26.83	Q
12	1	6	Syed Muhammad Haseeb Tariq	Pakistan	27.39	Q
13	3	2	Erico Cuna	Mozambique	28.03	Q
14	1	2	Jordan Gonzalez	Gibraltar	28.19	Q, NR
15	3	7	Alexandros Axiotis	Zambia	28.77	Q
16	2	2	Dillon Gooding	Saint Vincent and the Grenadines	29.96	Q
17	2	1	Finau Ohuafi	Tonga	29.97	
18	2	7	Cruz Halbich	Saint Vincent and the Grenadines	31.24	
19	1	7	Joshua Yon	Saint Helena	34.30	
20	3	1	Faletiute Tinapa	Tuvalu	34.94	

=== Semifinals ===
The semifinals were held on 7 April at 20:19.

==== Semifinal 1 ====
Rank	Lane	Name	Nationality	Time	Notes
1	4	Mitch Larkin	Australia	24.91	Q
2	5	Conor Ferguson	Northern Ireland	25.60	Q
3	3	Xavier Castelli	Wales	25.74	Q
4	6	Craig McNally	Scotland	26.00	Q
5	2	Thomas Hollingsworth	Guernsey	27.08	
6	7	Syed Muhammad Haseeb Tariq	Pakistan	27.23	
7	1	Jordan Gonzalez	Gibraltar	28.29	
8	8	Dillon Gooding	Saint Vincent and the Grenadines	29.74	

==== Semifinal 2 ====
Rank	Lane	Name	Nationality	Time	Notes
1	5	Ben Treffers	Australia	24.99	Q
2	4	Zac Incerti	Australia	25.19	Q
3	6	Harry Shalamon	Jersey	25.52	Q
4	3	Jian Han Tern	Malaysia	25.60	Q, NR
5	2	Srihari Nataraj	India	26.50	
6	7	Akalanka Peiris	Sri Lanka	26.52	NR
7	1	Erico Cuna	Mozambique	28.10	
8	8	Alexandros Axiotis	Zambia	28.57	

=== Final ===
The final was held on 8 April at 21:31.

Rank	Lane	Name	Nationality	Time	Notes
1st place, gold medalist(s)	4	Mitch Larkin	Australia	24.68	
2nd place, silver medalist(s)	5	Ben Treffers	Australia	24.84	
3rd place, bronze medalist(s)	3	Zac Incerti	Australia	25.06	
4	1	Xavier Castelli	Wales	25.44	
5	2	Conor Ferguson	Northern Ireland	25.72	
6	6	Harry Shalamon	Jersey	25.73	
7	8	Craig McNally	Scotland	25.80	
8	7	Jian Han Tern	Malaysia	25.96	
