= Swimming at the 2018 Commonwealth Games – Men's 200 metre backstroke =

Men's 200 metre backstroke at the 2018 Commonwealth Games
- Venue: Gold Coast Aquatic Centre
- Dates: 9 April
- Competitors: 20 from 20 nations
- Winning time: 1:56.10

Medalists
| gold medal | Mitch Larkin | Australia |
| silver medal | Bradley Woodward | Australia |
| bronze medal | Josh Beaver | Australia |

The men's 200 metre backstroke event at the 2018 Commonwealth Games was held on 9 April at the Gold Coast Aquatic Centre.

== Records ==
Prior to this competition, the existing world, Commonwealth and Games records were as follows:

| World record | Aaron Peirsol (USA) | 1:51.92 | Rome, Italy | 31 July 2009 |
| Commonwealth record | Mitch Larkin (AUS) | 1:53.17 | Dubai, United Arab Emirates | 7 November 2015 |
| Games record | James Goddard (ENG) | 1:55.58 | Delhi, India | 6 October 2010 |

== Results ==
=== Heats ===
The heats were held at 10:31.

| Rank | Heat | Lane | Name | Nationality | Time | Notes |
|---|---|---|---|---|---|---|
| 1 | 2 | 5 | Martin Binedell | South Africa | 1:57.92 | Q |
| 2 | 3 | 4 | Mitch Larkin | Australia | 1:57.99 | Q |
| 3 | 1 | 4 | Bradley Woodward | Australia | 1:58.41 | Q |
| 4 | 3 | 5 | Luke Greenbank | England | 1:58.54 | Q |
| 5 | 2 | 4 | Josh Beaver | Australia | 1:58.73 | Q |
| 6 | 3 | 6 | Markus Thormeyer | Canada | 1:59.68 | Q |
| 7 | 3 | 3 | Xavier Castelli | Wales | 2:00.08 | Q |
| 8 | 2 | 6 | Craig McNally | Scotland | 2:00.26 | Q |
| 9 | 2 | 3 | Conor Ferguson | Northern Ireland | 2:00.77 | |
| 10 | 3 | 7 | Lewis Clareburt | New Zealand | 2:01.54 | |
| 11 | 1 | 5 | Corey Main | New Zealand | 2:01.73 | |
| 12 | 1 | 6 | Josiah Binnema | Canada | 2:02.06 | |
| 13 | 1 | 3 | Jarryd Baxter | South Africa | 2:02.17 | |
| 14 | 2 | 7 | Bradlee Ashby | New Zealand | 2:02.32 | |
| 15 | 1 | 7 | Jason Arthur | Ghana | 2:03.91 | |
| 16 | 3 | 2 | Stephen Milne | Scotland | 2:04.45 | |
| 17 | 2 | 2 | Srihari Nataraj | India | 2:04.75 | |
| 18 | 1 | 2 | Luan Grobbelaar | South Africa | 2:06.10 | |
| 19 | 2 | 1 | Harry Shalamon | Jersey | 2:06.29 | |
| 20 | 3 | 1 | Akalanka Peiris | Sri Lanka | 2:11.56 | |

=== Final ===
The heats was held at 19:37.

| Rank | Lane | Name | Nationality | Time | Notes |
|---|---|---|---|---|---|
| 1st place, gold medalist(s) | 5 | Mitch Larkin | Australia | 1:56.10 | |
| 2nd place, silver medalist(s) | 3 | Bradley Woodward | Australia | 1:56.57 | |
| 3rd place, bronze medalist(s) | 2 | Josh Beaver | Australia | 1:57.04 | |
| 4 | 6 | Luke Greenbank | England | 1:57.43 | |
| 5 | 7 | Markus Thormeyer | Canada | 1:57.82 | |
| 6 | 4 | Martin Binedell | South Africa | 1:57.87 | |
| 7 | 8 | Craig McNally | Scotland | 1:58.32 | |
| 8 | 1 | Xavier Castelli | Wales | 1:59.27 | |
