= Alia Sazana Azahari =

Malaysian sports shooter (born 1991)

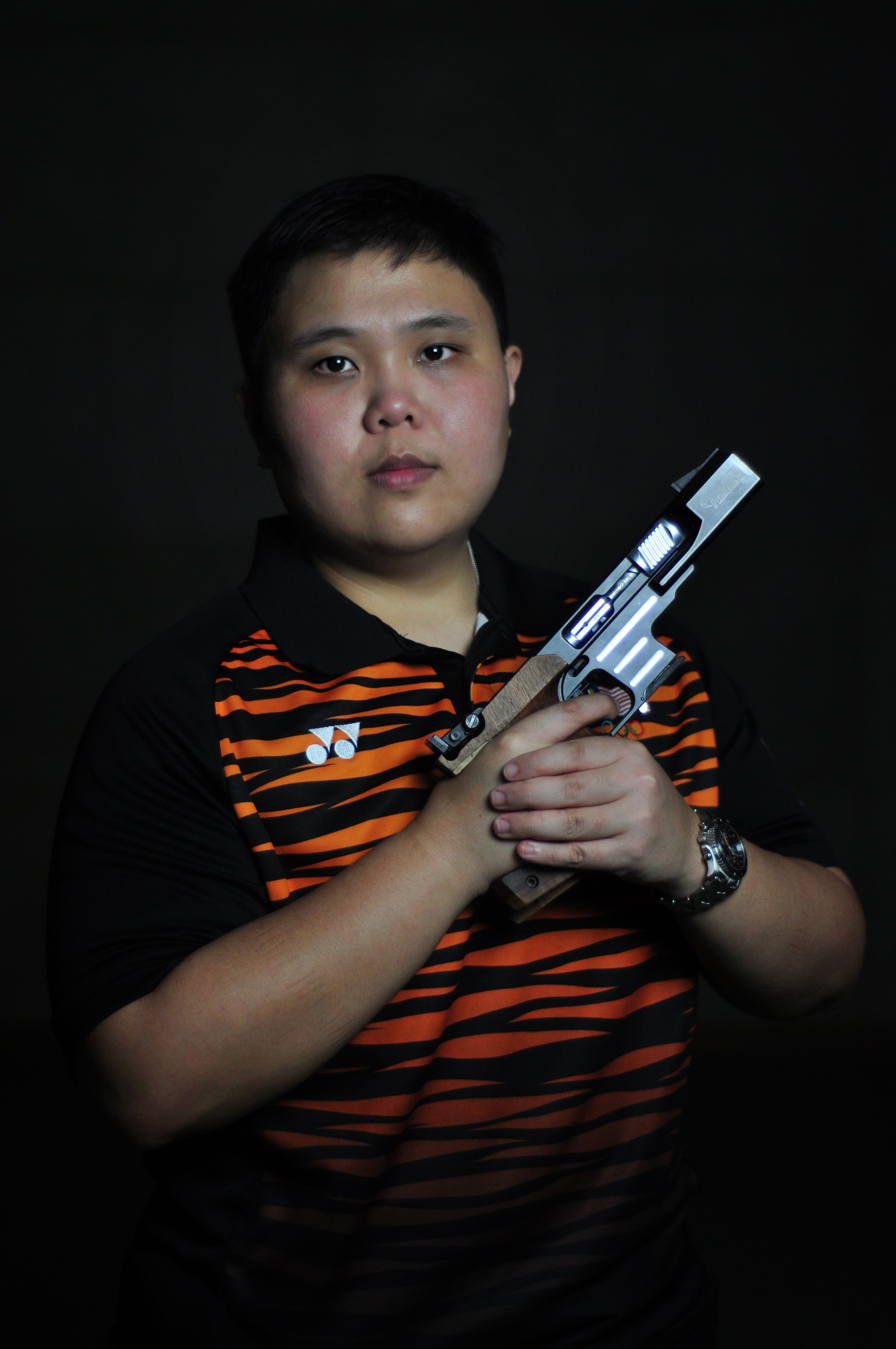

Personal information
- Nationality: Malaysian
- Born: 9 December 1991 (age 34) Kuala Terengganu, Malaysia

Sport
- Country: Malaysia
- Sport: Shooting
- Event(s): 25m Sport Pistol, 10m Air Pistol
Medal record
Shooting
Representing Malaysia
Commonwealth Games
Bronze medal – third place	2018 Gold Coast	25m Pistol
Southeast Asian Games
Gold medal – first place	2015 Singapore	25m Pistol
Gold medal – first place	2017 Kuala Lumpur	25m Pistol
Silver medal – second place	2021 Hanoi	25m Pistol
Asian Airgun Championship
Bronze medal – third place	2016 Tehran, Iran	10m Pistol Team
Southeast Asian Championship

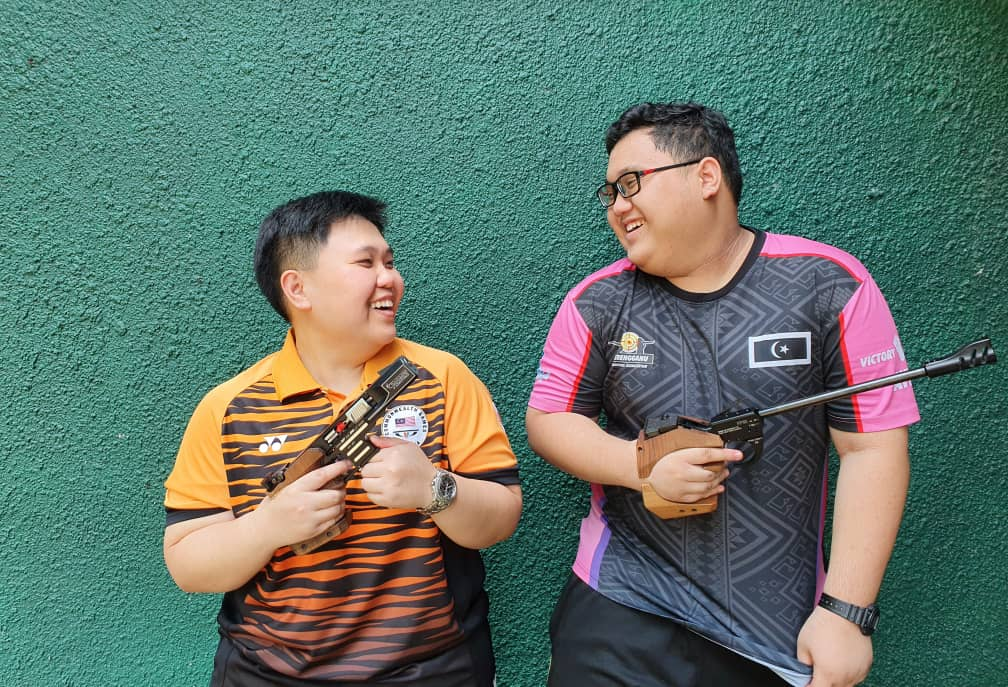
Alia and her brother, Azrin

Alia Sazana Azahari (born 9 December 1991) is a Malaysian sport shooter. She competed in the women's 25 metre pistol event at the 2018 Commonwealth Games, winning the bronze medal. She was born in Kuala Terengganu (Malaysia) to Vietnamese parents (father from An Giang, mother from Saigon).
