= Badminton at the 2018 Commonwealth Games – Mixed doubles =

Badminton – Mixed doubles at the 2018 Commonwealth Games
- Venue: Carrara Sports and Leisure Centre, Gold Coast
- Dates: 10–15 April

Medalists
gold medal	Chris Adcock; Gabby Adcock	England
silver medal	Marcus Ellis; Lauren Smith	England
bronze medal	Chan Peng Soon; Goh Liu Ying	Malaysia

The mixed doubles badminton event at the 2018 Commonwealth Games was held from 10 to 15 April 2018 at the Carrara Sports and Leisure Centre on the Gold Coast, Australia. The defending gold medalists were Chris Adcock and Gabby Adcock of England.

The athletes were drawn into straight knockout stage. The draw for the competition was conducted on 2 April 2018.

== Seeds ==
The seeds for the tournament were:

1. Goh Soon Huat / Shevon Jemie Lai (MAS) (quarter-finals)
2. Chris Adcock / Gabby Adcock (ENG) (gold medalists)
3. Marcus Ellis / Lauren Smith (ENG) (silver medalists)
4. Pranaav Jerry Chopra / N. Sikki Reddy (IND) (quarter-finals)

5. Terry Hee / Tan Wei Han (SGP) (quarter-finals)
6. Ben Lane / Jessica Pugh (ENG) (round of 32)
7. Sawan Serasinghe / Setyana Mapasa (AUS) (quarter-finals)
8. Chan Peng Soon / Goh Liu Ying (MAS) (bronze medalists)

Click on the seed number of a player to go to their draw section.

== Results ==
=== Finals ===
Semi-finals
Satwiksairaj Rankireddy (IND); Ashwini Ponnappa (IND)	22	18	16
3	Marcus Ellis (ENG); Lauren Smith (ENG)	20	21	21
8	Chan Peng Soon (MAS); Goh Liu Ying (MAS)	19	17
2	Chris Adcock (ENG); Gabby Adcock (ENG)	21	21

Gold medal match
3	Marcus Ellis (ENG); Lauren Smith (ENG)	21	17	16
2	Chris Adcock (ENG); Gabby Adcock (ENG)	19	21	21
Bronze medal match
Satwiksairaj Rankireddy (IND); Ashwini Ponnappa (IND)	19	19
8	Chan Peng Soon (MAS); Goh Liu Ying (MAS)	21	21

=== Top half ===
==== Section 1 ====
Round of 64
Ciaran Chambers (NIR); Sinead Chambers (NIR)	w	/	o
Douglas Clark (FAI); Cheryl March (FAI)
Emmanuel Donkor (GHA); Stella Koteikai Amasah (GHA)	20	21	21
Liam Fong (FIJ); Andra Whiteside (FIJ)	22	6	12
Satwiksairaj Rankireddy (IND); Ashwini Ponnappa (IND)	21	21
Stuart Hardy (GUE); Chloe le Tissier (GUE)	9	5
Cameron Coetzer (RSA); Michelle Butler-Emmett (RSA)	18	21	21
Aatish Lubah (MRI); Nicki Chan-Lam (MRI)	21	15	10

Round of 32
1	Goh Soon Huat (MAS); Shevon Jemie Lai (MAS)	21	21
Ciaran Chambers (NIR); Sinead Chambers (NIR)	6	12
Benjamin Li (IOM); Jessica Li (IOM)	17	18
Emmanuel Donkor (GHA); Stella Koteikai Amasah (GHA)	21	21
6	Ben Lane (ENG); Jessica Pugh (ENG)	17	16
Satwiksairaj Rankireddy (IND); Ashwini Ponnappa (IND)	21	21
Nyl Yakura (CAN); Kristen Tsai (CAN)	21	21
Cameron Coetzer (RSA); Michelle Butler-Emmett (RSA)	16	15

Round of 16
1	Goh Soon Huat (MAS); Shevon Jemie Lai (MAS)	21	21
Emmanuel Donkor (GHA); Stella Koteikai Amasah (GHA)	3	10
Satwiksairaj Rankireddy (IND); Ashwini Ponnappa (IND)	21	21
Nyl Yakura (CAN); Kristen Tsai (CAN)	10	7

Quarter-finals
1	Goh Soon Huat (MAS); Shevon Jemie Lai (MAS)	19	19
Satwiksairaj Rankireddy (IND); Ashwini Ponnappa (IND)	21	21

==== Section 2 ====
Round of 64
Murad Ali (PAK); Mahoor Shahzad (PAK)	5	6
Martin Campbell (SCO); Julie MacPherson (SCO)	21	21
Steve Malcouzane (SEY); Juliette Ah-Wan (SEY)	11	17
Anthony McNee (JAM); Alana Bailey (JAM)	21	21
Prakash Vijayanath (RSA); Johanita Scholtz (RSA)	21	21
Chongo Mulenga (ZAM); Everlyn Siamupangila (ZAM)	8	16
Sachin Dias (SRI); Thilini Hendahewa (SRI)	21	21
Edwin Ekiring (UGA); Shamim Bangi (UGA)	17	9

Round of 32
3	Marcus Ellis (ENG); Lauren Smith (ENG)	21	21
Martin Campbell (SCO); Julie MacPherson (SCO)	10	17
Oliver Leydon-Davis (NZL); Susannah Leydon-Davis (NZL)	21	19	21
Anthony McNee (JAM); Alana Bailey (JAM)	13	21	8
5	Terry Hee (SGP); Tan Wei Han (SGP)	21	21
Prakash Vijayanath (RSA); Johanita Scholtz (RSA)	10	12
Alexander Hutchings (JER); Elise Dixon (JER)	10	11
Sachin Dias (SRI); Thilini Hendahewa (SRI)	21	21

Round of 16
3	Marcus Ellis (ENG); Lauren Smith (ENG)	21	21
Oliver Leydon-Davis (NZL); Susannah Leydon-Davis (NZL)	17	12
5	Terry Hee (SGP); Tan Wei Han (SGP)	23	21
Sachin Dias (SRI); Thilini Hendahewa (SRI)	21	19

Quarter-finals
3	Marcus Ellis (ENG); Lauren Smith (ENG)	21	21
5	Terry Hee (SGP); Tan Wei Han (SGP)	17	13

=== Bottom half ===
==== Section 3 ====
Round of 64
Buwaneka Goonethilleka (SRI); Kavidi Sirimannage (SRI)	21	21
Abraham Ayittey (GHA); Gifty Mensah (GHA)	7	9
Victor Munga (KEN); Mercy Joseph (KEN)
Alexander Dunn (SCO); Eleanor O'Donnell (SCO)	w	/	o
Julien Paul (MRI); Aurélie Allet (MRI)	18	21	21
Irfan Saeed Bhatti (PAK); Palwasha Bashir (PAK)	21	17	19
Daniel Sam (GHA); Eyram Migbodzi (GHA)	8	13
Danny Bawa Chrisnanta (SGP); Crystal Wong (SGP)	21	21
Burty Molia (FIJ); Karyn Gibson (FIJ)	19	21	21
Brian Kasirye (UGA); Aisha Nakiyemba (UGA)	21	19	14

Round of 32
Buwaneka Goonethilleka (SRI); Kavidi Sirimannage (SRI)	19	17
Alexander Dunn (SCO); Eleanor O'Donnell (SCO)	21	21
Julien Paul (MRI); Aurélie Allet (MRI)	15	11
8	Chan Peng Soon (MAS); Goh Liu Ying (MAS)	21	21
Danny Bawa Chrisnanta (SGP); Crystal Wong (SGP)	21	21
Bongani von Bodenstein (RSA); Elsie de Villiers (RSA)	7	7
Burty Molia (FIJ); Karyn Gibson (FIJ)	8	9
4	Pranaav Jerry Chopra (IND); N. Sikki Reddy (IND)	21	21

Round of 16
Alexander Dunn (SCO); Eleanor O'Donnell (SCO)	9	16
8	Chan Peng Soon (MAS); Goh Liu Ying (MAS)	21	21
Danny Bawa Chrisnanta (SGP); Crystal Wong (SGP)	19	13
4	Pranaav Jerry Chopra (IND); N. Sikki Reddy (IND)	21	21

Quarter-finals
8	Chan Peng Soon (MAS); Goh Liu Ying (MAS)	21	21
4	Pranaav Jerry Chopra (IND); N. Sikki Reddy (IND)	17	12

==== Section 4 ====
Round of 64
Ty Alexander Lindeman (CAN); Brittney Tam (CAN)	21	21
Kervin Ghislain (SEY); Allisen Camille (SEY)	16	10
Tobi Adeoye (FAI); Zoe Morris (FAI)	7	5
Samuel Ricketts (JAM); Katherine Wynter (JAM)	21	21
Jason Wong (SGP); Ren-ne Ong (SGP)	21	21
Matthew Bignell (JER); Emily Temple Redshaw (JER)	13	13
Brian Yang (CAN); Michelle Li (CAN)	21	21
Jordan Trebert (GUE); Elena Johnson (GUE)	11	10

Round of 32
Ty Alexander Lindeman (CAN); Brittney Tam (CAN)	21	21
Kalombo Mulenga (ZAM); Ogar Siamupangila (ZAM)	9	13
Samuel Ricketts (JAM); Katherine Wynter (JAM)	17	4
7	Sawan Serasinghe (AUS); Setyana Mapasa (AUS)	21	21
Jason Wong (SGP); Ren-ne Ong (SGP)	21	21
Michael Opoku Baah (GHA); Grace Atipaka (GHA)	2	5
Brian Yang (CAN); Michelle Li (CAN)	10	16
2	Chris Adcock (ENG); Gabby Adcock (ENG)	21	21

Round of 16
Ty Alexander Lindeman (CAN); Brittney Tam (CAN)	14	18
7	Sawan Serasinghe (AUS); Setyana Mapasa (AUS)	21	21
Jason Wong (SGP); Ren-ne Ong (SGP)	16	17
2	Chris Adcock (ENG); Gabby Adcock (ENG)	21	21

Quarter-finals
7	Sawan Serasinghe (AUS); Setyana Mapasa (AUS)	10	14
2	Chris Adcock (ENG); Gabby Adcock (ENG)	21	21
