= Cycling at the 2018 Commonwealth Games – Men's road race =

Cycling races in Australia

Cycling – Men's road race at the 2018 Commonwealth Games
- Venue: Currumbin Beachfront
- Dates: 14 April
- Competitors: 115 from 34 nations
- Winning time: 3:57:01

Medalists
gold medal	Steele Von Hoff	Australia
silver medal	Jon Mould	Wales
bronze medal	Clint Hendricks	South Africa

The men's road race at the 2018 Commonwealth Games in Gold Coast, Australia was held on 14 April.

== Schedule ==
The schedule was as follows:

Date	Time	Round
Saturday 14 April 2018	12:30	Race

All times are Australian Eastern Standard Time (UTC+10)

== Results ==
The results were as follows:

Rank	Name	Time	Behind
1st place, gold medalist(s)	Steele Von Hoff (AUS)	3:57:01	–
2nd place, silver medalist(s)	Jon Mould (WAL)	s.t.	+0
3rd place, bronze medalist(s)	Clint Hendricks (RSA)	s.t.	"
4	Mark Downey (NIR)	s.t.	"
5	Hayden McCormick (NZL)	s.t.	"
6	Shane Archbold (NZL)	s.t.	"
7	Tobyn Horton (GGY)	s.t.	"
8	Thomas Stewart (ENG)	s.t.	"
9	Cameron Meyer (AUS)	s.t.	"
10	Sam Gaze (NZL)	3:57:04	+3
11	James Oram (NZL)	3:57:10	+9
12	Ian Bibby (ENG)	3:57:12	+11
13	Jack Bauer (NZL)	3:57:22	+21
14	Luke Rowe (WAL)	3:57:54	+53
15	Andreas Miltiadis (CYP)	3:57:58	+57
16	Jason Christie (NZL)	s.t.	"
17	Mark Stewart (SCO)	s.t.	"
18	Brendon Davids (RSA)	s.t.	"
19	Suleiman Kangangi (KEN)	s.t.	"
20	Charles Kagimu (UGA)	s.t.	"
21	Jean Claude Uwizeye (RWA)	s.t.	"
22	Cameron Orr (NIR)	s.t.	"
23	Didier Munyaneza (RWA)	3:58:00	+59
24	Bonaventure Uwizeyimana (RWA)	3:58:01	+1:00
25	Mathew Hayman (AUS)	3:58:07	+1:06
26	Christopher Latham (ENG)	3:59:08	+2:07
27	Bradley Potgieter (RSA)	s.t.	"
28	Marc Potts (NIR)	s.t.	"
29	James McLaughlin (GGY)	3:59:11	+2:10
30	Christopher Rougier-Lagane (MRI)	s.t.	"
31	Dylan Kerfoot-Robson (WAL)	3:59:35	+2:34
32	Jake Kelly (IOM)	s.t.	"
33	Jack English (GGY)	s.t.	"
34	Leon Mazzone (IOM)	s.t.	"
35	Grant Ferguson (SCO)	s.t.	"
36	Tristan De Lange (NAM)	s.t.	"
37	Joseph Areruya (RWA)	3:59:39	+2:38
38	Nicholas Dlamini (RSA)	s.t.	"
39	Salim Kipkemboi (KEN)	s.t.	"
40	Dan Craven (NAM)	s.t.	"
41	Peter Kibble (WAL)	s.t.	"
42	Harry Tanfield (ENG)	s.t.	"
43	Mitchell Docker (AUS)	s.t.	"
44	Dirk Coetzee (NAM)	4:05:45	+8:44
45	Daniel Halksworth (JEY)	4:06:26	+9:25
46	Alex Edmondson (AUS)	4:06:36	+9:35
47	Callum Scotson (AUS)	s.t.	"
48	Michael Foley (CAN)	4:07:59	+10:58
49	Alexandre Mayer (MRI)	s.t.	"
50	Thomas Mazzone (IOM)	4:08:16	+11:15
–	Nathan Draper (IOM)	DNF	–
–	Nolan Hoffman (RSA)	DNF	–
–	Alexander Smyth (MLT)	DNF	–
–	James Roe (GGY)	DNF	–
–	Rhys Hidrio (JEY)	DNF	–
–	Dylan Redy (MRI)	DNF	–
–	Hasani Hennis (AIA)	DNF	–
–	David Kinjah (KEN)	DNF	–

Rank	Name	Time	Behind
–	Peter Waruiru (KEN)	DNF	–
–	Jean Paul René Ukiniwabo (RWA)	DNF	–
–	Anthony Boakye Danquah (GHA)	DNF	–
–	Martin Freyer (NAM)	DNF	–
–	Kyle Gordon (SCO)	DNF	–
–	Michael Testori (CAY)	DNF	–
–	Oliver Wood (ENG)	DNF	–
–	Oscar Quiroz (BIZ)	DNF	–
–	Rhys Britton (WAL)	DNF	–
–	Jay Lamoureux (CAN)	DNF	–
–	Jack Rebours (JEY)	DNF	–
–	Avishka Mawathage (SRI)	DNF	–
–	Derek Barbara (GIB)	DNF	–
–	Jyme Bridges (ANT)	DNF	–
–	Adam Blythe (ENG)	DNF	–
–	Derek Gee (CAN)	DNF	–
–	Valens Ndayisenga (RWA)	DNF	–
–	Oliver Lowthorpe (JEY)	DNF	–
–	Sebastian Tremlett (GGY)	DNF	–
–	Marcus Christie (NIR)	DNF	–
–	Adam Jamieson (CAN)	DNF	–
–	Matthew Bostock (IOM)	DNF	–
–	Jeffery Kelsick (ANT)	DNF	–
–	David Treacy (MLT)	DNF	–
–	Miguel Duarte (MOZ)	DNF	–
–	Malefetsane Lesofe (LES)	DNF	–
–	Trevor Bailey (SVG)	DNF	–
–	Abdul Abdul Mumin (GHA)	DNF	–
–	Muzi Shabangu (SWZ)	DNF	–
–	Oshane Williams (JAM)	DNF	–
–	Gregory Rougier-Lagane (MRI)	DNF	–
–	Abdul Umar (GHA)	DNF	–
–	Giovanni Lovell (BIZ)	DNF	–
–	Bram Sanderson (DMA)	DNF	–
–	Christopher Gerry (SEY)	DNF	–
–	Viena Ssekanga (UGA)	DNF	–
–	Samuel Brand (IOM)	DNF	–
–	Saleem Romney (AIA)	DNF	–
–	Mduduzi Zwane (SWZ)	DNF	–
–	Gcina Banda (SWZ)	DNF	–
–	Enroy Lewis (SVG)	DNF	–
–	Michael Serafin (GGY)	DNF	–
–	Aidan Caves (CAN)	DNF	–
–	Xeno Young (NIR)	DNF	–
–	Joseph Sheriff (GIB)	DNF	–
–	Edgar Arana (BIZ)	DNF	–
–	Jeff Esparon (SEY)	DNF	–
–	Zambezi Richardson (AIA)	DNF	–
–	Sherwin Osborne (AIA)	DNF	–
–	Jay Major (BAH)	DNF	–
–	Anthony Colebrook (BAH)	DNF	–
–	Ali Kamara (SLE)	DNF	–
–	Mahmoud Keita (SLE)	DNF	–
–	Huekeemi Hughes (AIA)	DNF	–
–	Chamika Werenappulige (SRI)	DNF	–
–	Julian Bellido (GIB)	DNF	–
–	Stephen Belle (SEY)	DNF	–
