= Amalia Matali =

Bruneian lawn bowler

Personal information
- Nationality: Bruneian
- Born: 24 January 1977 (age 49)
Medal record
Representing (Brunei)
World Singles Champion of Champions
Silver medal – second place	2016 Brisbane	singles

Amalia Matali (born 24 January 1977) is an international lawn bowler from Brunei Darussalam.

== Bowls career ==
Matali has represented Brunei Darussalam at the Commonwealth Games, in the pairs event at the 2002 Commonwealth Games.

She caused a sensation when reaching the final and winning the silver medal at the 2016 World Singles Champion of Champions in Brisbane, Australia.

In 2018, she was selected by Brunei to represent the nation at the 2018 Commonwealth Games in Australia. She participated in the Lawn bowls at the 2018 Commonwealth Games – Women's singles and just missed out on reaching the quarter finals after a third place finish in group B.
