= Rachel MacDonald =

Scottish Gaelic poet (c. 1750–c. 1830)

- Raonaid Nighean Mhic Nèill
- Born: c. 1750; North Uist
- Died: c. 1830; Benbecula
- Occupation: Poet

Rachel MacDonald (Gaelic:Raonaid Nighean Mhic Nèill; c. 1750 - c. 1830) was a Scottish Gaelic language poet. Only a few of her works survive.

Rachel MacDonald was born in Grenitote on the island of North Uist. She was the daughter of Neill MacDonald, fourth of Grenitote (a descendant of John Cathanach MacDonald, 4th of Dunnyveg) and Catherine, daughter of Donald MacDonald of Trumisgarry. In 1799 she appears in records as a weaver. Around 1803, she and her brother Angus moved to Liniclate on the island of Benbecula.

Two of her songs appear in The MacDonald Collection of Gaelic Poetry (1911): "Oran Fir Heisgir" and "Oran Leis an Raonaid Cheudna". "Oran Fir Heisgir" (" A song to the Laird of Heisgir") is dedicated to Archibald Maclean of Heisker and his skill as boatman when he offered her passage from Loch Dunvegan on the Isle of Skye across The Minch to Uist during a storm. William Matheson published two of her songs in 1976. One is a song written in conversation with deer in a glen, the other is about a young man from Harris who became a soldier instead of marrying her.
