= Malta at the Commonwealth Games =

- CG code: MLT
- CGA: Malta Olympic Committee
- Website: www.nocmalta.org
- Medals Ranked 54th: Gold 0 Silver 1 Bronze 6 Total 7

Commonwealth Games appearances (overview)
- 1958; 1962; 1966; 1970; 1974–1978; 1982; 1986; 1990; 1994; 1998; 2002; 2006; 2010; 2014; 2018; 2022; 2026; 2030

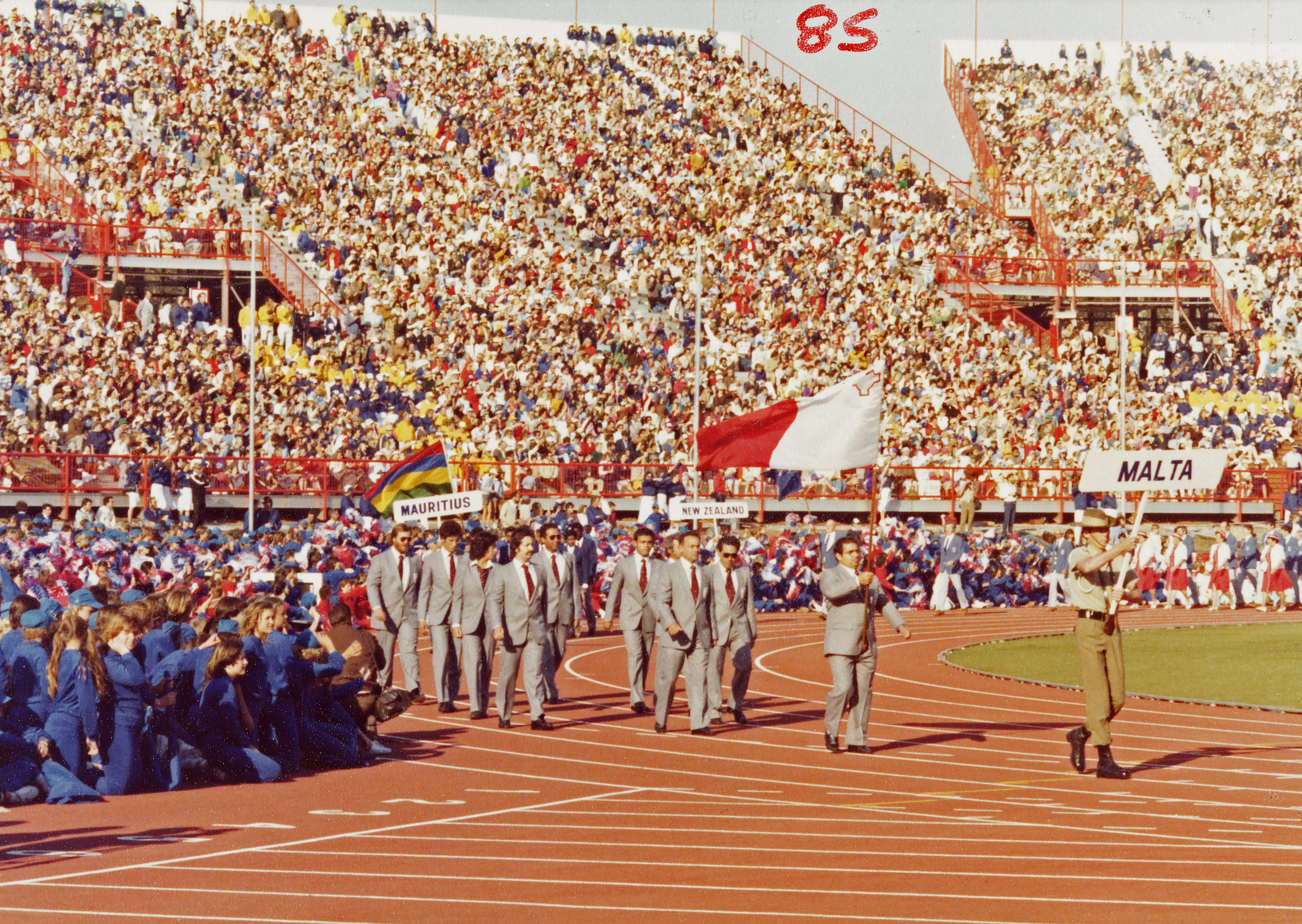
The Maltese team at the opening ceremony in Brisbane, 1982

Malta have competed at fourteen Commonwealth Games, making their debut in 1958. They did not attend in 1966, 1974 or 1978, but have attended every Games since 1982. Malta have won eight medals at the Games, four of these in shooting and three in judo.

== Medals ==
Games	Gold	Silver	Bronze	Total
1958 Cardiff	0	0	0	0
1962 Perth	0	0	0	0
1966 Kingston	did not attend			
1970 Edinburgh	0	0	0	0
1974 Christchurch	did not attend			
1978 Edmonton	did not attend			
1982 Brisbane	0	0	0	0
1986 Edinburgh	0	0	0	0
1990 Auckland	0	0	1	1
1994 Victoria	0	0	0	0
1998 Kuala Lumpur	0	0	0	0
2002 Manchester	0	0	1	1
2006 Melbourne	0	1	1	2
2010 Delhi	0	0	0	0
2014 Glasgow	0	0	0	0
2018 Gold Coast	0	0	2	2
2022 Birmingham	0	0	1	1
2026 Glasgow	0	0	1	1
Total	0	1	7	8

== Medallists ==
Medal	Year	Name	Sport	Event	Refs
Silver	2006	Rebecca Madyson	Shooting	Women's Trap	
Bronze	1990	Laurie Pace	Judo	Women's 61kg	
Bronze	2002	William Chetcuti	Shooting	Men's Double Trap	
Bronze	2006	William Chetcuti	Shooting	Men's Double Trap	
Bronze	2018	Sharon Callus; Connie-Leigh Rixon; Rebecca Rixon; Rosemaree Rixon	Lawn bowls	Women's Fours	
Bronze	2018	Brian Galea	Shooting	Men's Trap	
Bronze	2022	Katryna Esposito	Judo	Women's 48 kg	
Bronze	2026	Katryna Esposito	Judo	Women's 48 kg	

Medals by sport
Sport	Gold medal	Silver medal	Bronze medal	Total
Shooting	0	1	3	4
Judo	0	0	3	3
Bowls	0	0	1	1
Total	0	1	7	8
