= Malta at the 2022 Commonwealth Games =

- Flag of Malta
- CGF code: MLT
- CGA: Maltese Olympic Committee
- Website: nocmalta.org

in Birmingham, England 28 July 2022 – 8 August 2022
- Competitors: 29 (13 men and 16 women) in 9 sports
- Flag bearers: Kijan Sultana; Tenishia Thornton
- Medals Ranked 40th: Gold 0 Silver 0 Bronze 1 Total 1

Commonwealth Games appearances (overview)
- 1958; 1962; 1966; 1970; 1974–1978; 1982; 1986; 1990; 1994; 1998; 2002; 2006; 2010; 2014; 2018; 2022; 2026; 2030

Malta competed at the 2022 Commonwealth Games in Birmingham, England between 28 July and 8 August 2022. It was Malta's fourteenth appearance at the Games.

On 12 July 2022, the Maltese Olympic Committee announced a team of 29 athletes (13 men and 16 women) competing in nine sports. Squash athlete Kijan Sultana and weightlifter Tenishia Thornton were the country's opening ceremony flagbearers.

== Medalists ==
Medal	Name	Sport	Event	Date
Bronze	Katryna Esposito	Judo	Women's -48kg	1 August

== Competitors ==
The following is the list of number of competitors participating at the Games per sport/discipline.

Sport	Men	Women	Total
Athletics	0	4	4
Badminton	2	0	2
Cycling	1	0	1
Judo	1	1	2
Lawn bowls	4	4	8
Squash	2	2	4
Triathlon	1	1	2
Weightlifting	0	4	4
Wrestling	2	0	2
Total	13	16	29

== Athletics ==
A squad of four athletes was announced on 12 July 2022.

Women
Track and road events

Athlete	Event	Heat		Semifinal		Final	
Athlete	Event	Result	Rank	Result	Rank	Result	Rank
Carla Scicluna	100 m	11.89	6	Did not advance			
Charlotte Wingfield	200 m	24.47	4 q	24.52	8	Did not advance	
Janet Richard	400 m	54.51	6	Did not advance			
Claire Azzopardi; Janet Richard; Carla Scicluna; Charlotte Wingfield	4 × 100 m relay	45.59	5	—		Did not advance	

Field events

Athlete	Event	Qualification		Final	
Athlete	Event	Distance	Rank	Distance	Rank
Claire Azzopardi	Long jump	5.76	16	Did not advance	

== Badminton ==
A squad of two players was announced on 12 July 2022.

Athlete	Event	Round of 64	Round of 32	Round of 16	Quarterfinal	Semifinal	Final / BM	
Athlete	Event	Opposition Score	Opposition Score	Opposition Score	Opposition Score	Opposition Score	Opposition Score	Rank
Matthew Abela	Men's singles	Lin (AUS); L 0 - 2	Did not advance					
Samuel Cassar	Men's singles	Bye	Abeywickrama (SRI); L 0 - 2	Did not advance				
Matthew Abela; Samuel Cassar	Men's doubles	—	Attama & Mwanbu (UGA); W 2 - 0	Schueler & Tang (AUS); L 0 - 2	Did not advance			

== Cycling ==
One cyclist (Aiden Buttigieg) was officially selected as of 12 July 2022.

=== Road ===
Men

Athlete	Event	Time	Rank
Aidan Buttigieg	Road race	3:37:20	60
Aidan Buttigieg	Time trial	56:05.93	36

== Judo ==
A squad of two judoka was announced on 12 July 2022.

Athlete	Event	Round of 16	Quarterfinals	Semifinals	Repechage	Final/BM	
Athlete	Event	Opposition Result	Opposition Result	Opposition Result	Opposition Result	Opposition Result	Rank
Isaac Bezzina	Men's -100 kg	Thompson (ENG); L 00 - 01	Did not advance				9
Katryna Esposito	Women's -48 kg	Bye	Platten (ENG); L 00 - 10	Did not advance	Barnikel (WAL); W 10 - 00	Morand (MRI); W 10 - 00	3rd place, bronze medalist(s)

== Lawn bowls ==
A squad of eight bowlers was selected on 28 April 2022.

Men

Athlete	Event	Group stage					Quarterfinal	Semifinal	Final / BM	
Athlete	Event	Opposition Score	Opposition Score	Opposition Score	Opposition Score	Rank	Opposition Score	Opposition Score	Opposition Score	Rank
Shaun Parnis; Troy Lorimer; Peter Ellul	Triples	Scotland; L 6 - 28	New Zealand; W 22 - 12	India; T 16 - 16	—	2 Q	Fiji; L 14 - 15	Did not advance		
Peter Ellul; Troy Lorimer; Mark Malogorski; Shaun Parnis	Fours	Scotland; L 9 - 17	Jersey; L 11 - 19	South Africa; W 19 - 15	New Zealand; L 13 - 14	5	Did not advance			

Women

Athlete	Event	Group stage					Quarterfinal	Semifinal	Final / BM	
Athlete	Event	Opposition Score	Opposition Score	Opposition Score	Opposition Score	Rank	Opposition Score	Opposition Score	Opposition Score	Rank
Connie Rixon; Rebecca Rixon	Pairs	Norfolk Island; L 18 - 21	Guernsey; T 17 - 17	Malaysia; L 16 - 20	Cook Islands; L 15 - 22	5	Did not advance			
Irene Attard; Connie Rixon; Rebecca Rixon; Rose Rixon	Fours	Northern Ireland; L 10 - 16	Norfolk Island; L 12 - 16	Malaysia; L 6 - 22	—	4	Did not advance			

== Squash ==
A squad of four players was announced on 12 July 2022.

Singles

Athlete	Event	Round of 64	Round of 32	Round of 16	Quarterfinals	Semifinals	Final	
Athlete	Event	Opposition Score	Opposition Score	Opposition Score	Opposition Score	Opposition Score	Opposition Score	Rank
Niall Engerer	Men's singles	Sultana (MLT); W 3 - 1	Coll (NZL); L 0 - 3	Did not advance				
Kijan Sultana	Men's singles	Engerer (MLT); L 1 - 3	Did not advance					
Colette Sultana	Women's singles	Bye	Turnbull (AUS); L 1 - 3	Did not advance				
Lijana Sultana	Women's singles	Knaggs (TTO); W 3 - 2	Naughton (CAN); L 0 - 3	Did not advance				

Doubles

Athlete	Event	Round of 32	Round of 16	Quarterfinals	Semifinals	Final	
Athlete	Event	Opposition Score	Opposition Score	Opposition Score	Opposition Score	Opposition Score	Rank
Kijan Sultana; Niall Engerer	Men's doubles	Jervis / Stafford (CAY); W 2 - 1	Willstrop / James (ENG); L 0 - 2	Did not advance			
Lijana Sultana; Colette Sultana	Women's doubles	Haywood / Best (BAR); L 1 - 2	Did not advance				
Niall Engerer; Colette Sultana	Mixed doubles	Evans / Makin (WAL); L 0 - 2	Did not advance				
Lijana Sultana; Kijan Sultana	Mixed doubles	Kennedy / Rooney (ENG); L 0 - 2	Did not advance				

== Triathlon ==
A squad of two triathletes was announced on 12 July 2022.

Individual

Athlete	Event	Swim (750 m)	Trans 1	Bike (20 km)	Trans 2	Run (5 km)	Total	Rank
Keith Galea	Men's	10:37	1:11	30:19	0:28	19:05	1:01:40	31
Danica Bonello Spiteri	Women's	11:16	1:09	33:04	0:31	21:21	1:07:21	25

== Weightlifting ==
Courtesy of their positions on the IWF Commonwealth Ranking List (which was finalised on 9 March 2022), a squad of four weightlifters was officially selected on 23 April 2022.

Women

Athlete	Event	Weight lifted		Total	Rank
Athlete	Event	Snatch	Clean & jerk	Total	Rank
Tenishia Thornton	59 kg	78	100	178	8
Yasmin Zammit Stevens	64 kg	83	103	186	6
Roberta Tabone	71 kg	86	105	191	8
Elisia Scicluna	+87 kg	80	105	185	10

== Wrestling ==
A squad of two wrestlers was announced on 12 July 2022.

Key:

- VT - Victory by Fall.
- PP - Decision by Points - the loser with technical points.
- PO - Decision by Points - the loser without technical points.

Athlete	Event	Round of 16	Quarterfinal	Semifinal	Repechage	Final / BM	
Athlete	Event	Opposition Result	Opposition Result	Opposition Result	Opposition Result	Opposition Result	Rank
Gary Giordmaina	Men's -57 kg	Holland (AUS); W 8 - 4	Capellan (CAN); L 2 - 12	Did not advance			7
Adam Vella	Men's -65 kg	Ullah (PAK); L 0 - 10	Did not advance				12

== See also ==
- Malta at the 2022 Winter Olympics
