= Lawn bowls at the 2018 Commonwealth Games =

- Venue: Broadbeach Bowls Club
- Dates: 5 – 13 April 2018
- Competitors: 240 from 28 nations

Lawn bowls at the 2018 Commonwealth Games was the 20th appearance of lawn bowls at the Commonwealth Games. The lawn bowls competition was held at the Broadbeach Bowls Club in the Gold Coast, Australia, from April 5 to 13.

Lawn bowls is one of ten core sports at the Commonwealth Games and has been continuously held at every Games since the 1930 British Empire Games, with the exception of the 1966 British Empire and Commonwealth Games in Kingston, Jamaica. A total of four events per gender were contested, along with two open para-sport events, which meant a total of ten medal events were contested.

== Schedule ==
The following is the Lawn bowls schedule:

G	Group stage	¼	Quarter-finals	½	Semi-finals	B	Bronze medal match	G	Gold medal match

Date →	Thu 5			Fri 6			Sat 7			Sun 8			Mon 9			Tue 10			Wed 11			Thu 12			Fri 13		
Event ↓	M	A	E	M	A	E	M	A	E	M	A	E	M	A	E	M	A	E	M	A	E	M	A	E	M	A	E
Men's singles														G								¼				½	B
Men's singles														G								¼				½	G
Men's pairs		G			G			G	¼		½		B														
Men's pairs		G			G			G	¼		½		G														
Men's triples	G			G			G	¼	½	B																	
Men's triples	G			G			G	¼	½	G																	
Men's fours															G			G			G		¼	½		B	
Men's fours															G			G			G		¼	½		G	
Women's singles	G			G			G		¼		½	B															
Women's singles	G			G			G		¼		½	G															
Women's pairs													G			G			G			¼	½		B		
Women's pairs													G			G			G			¼	½		G		
Women's triples															G			G			G	½		B			
Women's triples															G			G			¼	½		G			
Women's fours			G		G			G	¼	½				B													
Women's fours			G		G			G	¼	½				G													
Mixed B2/B3 pairs			G			G			G					G				½			B						
Mixed B2/B3 pairs			G			G			G					G				½			G						
Open B6/B7/B8 triples			G			G			G			G			G						½		B				
Open B6/B7/B8 triples			G			G			G			G			G						½		G				

M = Morning session, A = Afternoon session, E = Evening session

== Medal table ==
* Host nation (Australia)

Rank	Nation	Gold	Silver	Bronze	Total
1	Australia*	5	2	0	7
2	Scotland	2	2	1	5
3	Wales	1	1	1	3
4	New Zealand	1	1	0	2
5	Malaysia	1	0	0	1
6	South Africa	0	3	2	5
7	Canada	0	1	0	1
8	England	0	0	3	3
9	Cook Islands	0	0	1	1
9	Malta	0	0	1	1
9	Norfolk Island	0	0	1	1
Totals (11 entries)		10	10	10	30

== Medallists ==
=== Men ===
Event	Gold	Silver	Bronze
Singles	Australia; Aaron Wilson	Canada; Ryan Bester	England; Robert Paxton
Pairs	Wales; Daniel Salmon; Marc Wyatt	Scotland; Paul Foster; Alex Marshall	Cook Islands; Taiki Paniani; Aidan Zittersteijn
Triples	Scotland; Darren Burnett; Derek Oliver; Ronnie Duncan	Australia; Aron Sherriff; Barrie Lester; Nathan Rice	Norfolk Island; Hadyn Evans; Phillip Jones; Ryan Dixon
Fours	Scotland; Alex Marshall; Paul Foster; Derek Oliver; Ronnie Duncan	Australia; Aron Sherriff; Barrie Lester; Nathan Rice; Brett Wilkie	England; David Bolt; Jamie Chestney; Sam Tolchard; Louis Ridout

=== Women ===
Event	Gold	Silver	Bronze
Singles	New Zealand; Jo Edwards	Wales; Laura Daniels	South Africa; Colleen Piketh
Pairs	Malaysia; Emma Firyana; Siti Zalina	South Africa; Colleen Piketh; Nicolene Neal	Scotland; Claire Johnston; Lesley Doig
Triples	Australia; Carla Krizanic; Natasha Scott; Rebecca Van Asch	Scotland; Caroline Brown; Kay Moran; Stacey McDougall	England; Ellen Falkner; Katherine Rednall; Sian Honnor
Fours	Australia; Carla Krizanic; Kelsey Cottrell; Natasha Scott; Rebecca Van Asch	South Africa; Elma Davis; Esme Kruger; Johanna Snyman; Nicolene Neal	Malta; Connie-Leigh Rixon; Rebecca Rixon; Rosemaree Rixon; Sharon Callus

=== Para-sport ===
Event	Gold	Silver	Bronze
Mixed para-sport pairs	Australia; Jake Fehlberg; Lynne Seymour	South Africa; Philippus Walker; Nozipho Schroeder	Wales; Gilbert Miles; Julie Thomas
Open para-sport triples	Australia; Josh Thornton; Ken Hanson; Tony Bonnell	New Zealand; Barry Wynks; Bruce Wakefield; Mark Noble	South Africa; Christopher Patton; Tobias Botha; Willem Viljoen

== Participating nations ==
There are 28 participating nations in the lawn bowls with a total of 240 athletes. The number of athletes a nation entered is in parentheses beside the name of the country.

- Australia (15)
- Botswana (7)
- Brunei (8)
- Canada (10)
- Cook Islands (10)
- England (15)
- Fiji (10)
- Guernsey (4)
- India (10)
- Isle of Man (2)
- Jamaica (2)
- Jersey (8)
- Kenya (2)
- Malta (6)
- Malaysia (10)
- Namibia (8)
- New Zealand (15)
- Niue (10)
- Norfolk Island (10)
- Northern Ireland (10)
- Papua New Guinea (10)
- Samoa (2)
- Scotland (15)
- Singapore (4)
- Tonga (2)
- South Africa (15)
- Wales (15)
- Zambia (5)

== See also ==
- List of Commonwealth Games medallists in lawn bowls
- Lawn bowls at the Commonwealth Games
