= Papua New Guinea at the 2018 Commonwealth Games =

- Flag of Papua New Guinea
- CG code: PNG
- CGA: Papua New Guinea Sports Federation and Olympic Committee
- Website: oceaniasportoceaniasport.com/png

in Gold Coast, Australia 4 April 2018 – 15 April 2018
- Competitors: 56 in 9 sports
- Flag bearer: Vero Nime
- Medals Ranked 22nd: Gold 1 Silver 2 Bronze 0 Total 3

Commonwealth Games appearances (overview)
- 1962; 1966; 1970; 1974; 1978; 1982; 1986; 1990; 1994; 1998; 2002; 2006; 2010; 2014; 2018; 2022; 2026; 2030

Papua New Guinea competed at the 2018 Commonwealth Games in the Gold Coast, Australia from April 4 to April 15, 2018.

Para table tennis athlete Vero Nime was the country's flag bearer during the opening ceremony.

== Competitors ==
The following is the list of number of competitors participating at the Games per sport/discipline.

Sport	Men	Women	Total
Athletics	8	3	11
Boxing	3	1	4
Lawn bowls	5	5	10
Rugby sevens	13	0	13
Shooting	2	1	3
Squash	1	1	2
Swimming	4	0	4
Table tennis	1	1	2
Triathlon	0	1	1
Weightlifting	3	3	6
Total	40	16	56

== Medalists ==
Medal	Name	Sport	Event	Date
Gold	Steven Kari	Weightlifting	Men's −94 kg	April 8
Silver	Dika Toua	Weightlifting	Women's −53 kg	April 6
Silver	Morea Baru	Weightlifting	Men's −62 kg	April 5

Medals by sport
Sport	1st place, gold medalist(s)	2nd place, silver medalist(s)	3rd place, bronze medalist(s)	Total
Weightlifting	1	2	0	3
Total	1	2	0	3

Medals by day
Day	1st place, gold medalist(s)	2nd place, silver medalist(s)	3rd place, bronze medalist(s)	Total
5 April	1	0	0	1
6 April	0	1	0	1
7 April	0	0	0	0
8 April	0	1	0	1
9 April	0	0	0	0
10 April	0	0	0	0
Total	1	2	0	3

Medals by gender
Gender	1st place, gold medalist(s)	2nd place, silver medalist(s)	3rd place, bronze medalist(s)	Total
Female	0	1	0	1
Male	1	1	0	2
Mixed	0	0	0	0
Total	1	2	0	3

== Athletics (track and field) ==
Athletics Papua New Guinea announced a team of 11 athletes.

Men
Track and road events

Athlete	Event	Heat		Semifinal		Final	
Athlete	Event	Result	Rank	Result	Rank	Result	Rank
Wesley Logorava	100 metres	10.88	7	Did not advance			
Wesley Logorava	200 metres	22.00	4	Did not advance			
Nazmie-Lee Marai	100 metres	10.96	8	Did not advance			
Nazmie-Lee Marai	200 metres	22.14	6	Did not advance			
Theo Piniau	200 metres	21.76	5	Did not advance			
Ephraim Lerkin	400 metres hurdles	52.17	7	—N/a		Did not advance	
Mowen Boino	400 metres hurdles	51.61	8	—N/a		Did not advance	
Samuel Nason	100 metres (T47)	—N/a				12.75	6
	4 × 400 m relay	DNS		—N/a		Did not advance	

Field events

Athlete	Event	Qualification		Final	
Athlete	Event	Distance	Rank	Distance	Rank
Peniel Richard	Long jump	6.98	23	Did not advance	
Peniel Richard	Triple jump	15.23	17	Did not advance	
De'bono Paraka	Shot put	49.02	11 q	52.60	10
De'bono Paraka	Discus throw	49.02	q	52.60 NR	10

Women
Track and road events

Athlete	Event	Heat		Semifinal		Final	
Athlete	Event	Result	Rank	Result	Rank	Result	Rank
Afure Adah	100 metres	11.99	5	Did not advance			
Afure Adah	200 metres	24.54	5	Did not advance			
Adrine Monagi	100 metres hurdles	13.92	7	—N/a		Did not advance	

Field events

Athlete	Event	Qualification		Final	
Athlete	Event	Distance	Rank	Distance	Rank
Rellie Kaputin	Long jump	6.18	13	Did not advance	
Rellie Kaputin	Triple jump	—N/a		NM	

== Boxing ==
The Papua New Guinea Amateur Boxing Union (PNGABU) announced a team of four elite boxers to the 2018 games.

Athlete	Event	Round of 32	Round of 16	Quarterfinals	Semifinals	Final	Rank
Athlete	Event	Opposition Result	Opposition Result	Opposition Result	Opposition Result	Opposition Result	Rank
Charles Keama	Men's −52 kg	—N/a	BYE	Gaurav Solanki (IND); L 0-5	Did not advance		
Thadius Katua	Men's −60 kg	Adeola Soyoye (NGR); W 3-1	Henry Kia (SOL); W RSC	Mickey McDonagh (WAL); L 0-5	Did not advance		
John Ume	Men's −64 kg	BYE	Liam Wilson (AUS); L 0-5	Did not advance			
Laizani Soma	Women's −60 kg	—N/a	Paige Murney (ENG); L 0-5	Did not advance			

== Lawn bowls ==
Papua New Guinea will compete in Lawn bowls.

Men

Athlete	Event	Group stage						Quarterfinal	Semifinal	Final / BM	
Athlete	Event	Opposition Score	Opposition Score	Opposition Score	Opposition Score	Opposition Score	Rank	Opposition Score	Opposition Score	Opposition Score	Rank
Matu Bazo	Singles	Kelly (NIR); L 4 - 21	McGreal (IOM); W 21 - 18	Bester (CAN); L 13 - 21	Gaborutwe (BOT); W 21 - 18	de Sousa (JER); W 21 - 16	3	Did not advance			
Matu Bazo; Gabriel Tika	Pairs	Fiji; L 16 - 20	New Zealand; L 11 - 24	England; L 14 - 28	Cook Islands; L 14 - 18	Botswana; W 21 - 11	5	Did not advance			
Fred Koesan; Polin Pomaleu; Manu Walo	Triples	England; L 6 - 24	India; L 11 - 16	South Africa; L 15 - 16	Wales; L 10 - 27	—N/a	5	Did not advance			
Fred Koesan; Polin Pomaleu; Gabriel Tika; Manu Walo	Fours	Wales; L 10 - 13	Cook Islands; D 14 - 14	New Zealand; L 12 - 20	Canada; L 17 - 19	—N/a	4	Did not advance			

Women

Athlete	Event	Group stage						Quarterfinal	Semifinal	Final / BM	
Athlete	Event	Opposition Score	Opposition Score	Opposition Score	Opposition Score	Opposition Score	Rank	Opposition Score	Opposition Score	Opposition Score	Rank
Catherine Wimp	Singles	Mbugua (KEN); L 15 - 21	McKerihen (CAN); L 14 - 21	Anderson (NFI); L 11 - 21	Mataio (COK); W 21 - 7	Senna (BOT); W 21 - 9	3	Did not advance			
Rebecca Walo; Catherine Wimp	Pairs	England; L 14 - 16	Zambia; L 13 - 18	Niue; W 21 - 8	Australia; L 7 - 29	Malta; L 19 - 20	5	Did not advance			
Loa Babona; Ju Carlo; Piwen Karkar	Triples	Australia; L 12 - 32	India; L 6 - 32	Canada; W 14 - 11	Fiji; W 17 - 16	—N/a	3	Did not advance			
Loa Babona; Ju Carlo; Piwen Karkar; Rebecca Walo	Fours	Australia; L 1 - 41	Cook Islands; W 15 - 11	Namibia; D 12 - 12	Malaysia; L 6 - 17	—N/a	3	Did not advance			

== Rugby sevens ==
The Papua New Guinea men's team qualified after being ranked the highest not already qualified Commonwealth nation at the 2017 Oceania Sevens Championship.

=== Men's tournament ===
Roster

- Himah Alu
- Issac Aquilla
- Nathan Baramun
- Emmanuel Guise
- Henry Kalua
- Gairo Kapana
- Samuel Malambes
- Freddy Rova
- Patrick Tatut
- William Tirang
- Eugene Tokavai
- Wesley Vali
- Reserve: Arthur Clement

Pool A

Pos	Team	Pld	W	D	L	PF	PA	PD	Pts	Qualification
1	South Africa	3	3	0	0	121	5	+116	9	Semi-finals
2	Scotland	3	2	0	1	73	26	+47	7	Classification semi-finals
3	Papua New Guinea	3	1	0	2	31	84	−53	5	
4	Malaysia	3	0	0	3	5	115	−110	3	

Source: GC2018
Rules for classification: 1) Points; 2) Head-to-head result; 3) Point difference; 4) Points scored.

14 April 2018
11:43

Scotland	27–0	Papua New Guinea
Try: Farndale (2) 1' c, 8' m Graham 3' m Horne 5' m Fleming 14'; Con: Horne (1/1) 1'; Jackson (0/3)	(Gold Coast 2018)	Cards: Baramun (yellow card) 14'

Robina Stadium, Gold Coast
Referee: Tevita Rokovereni (Fiji)

14 April 2018
18:37

South Africa	52–0	Papua New Guinea
Try: Kok 1' c Specman (2) 1' m, 9' c Nel (2) 3' c, 5' c Sage 7' c Du Preez 11' m Davids 13' c Con: Du Preez (5/7) 1', 4', 5', 7', 9'; Afrika (1/1) 13'	(Gold Coast 2018)

Robina Stadium, Gold Coast
Referee: Richard Kelly (New Zealand)

14 April 2018
21:55

Papua New Guinea	31–5	Malaysia
Try: Kapana (2) 4' m, 6' c Guise 7' c Vali 8' c Tirang 12' m Con: Guise (1/3) 6'; Tokavai (2/2) 7', 8'	(Gold Coast 2018)	Try: Tarmizi 10' m Con: Affandi (0/1)

Robina Stadium, Gold Coast
Referee: Rasta Rasivhenge (South Africa)

== Shooting ==
Papua New Guinea participated with 3 athletes (2 men and 1 woman).

Athlete	Event	Qualification		Final	
Athlete	Event	Points	Rank	Points	Rank
Angus Donald	Men's Trap	94	33	Did not advance	
Daniel Wanma	Men's Trap	111	16	Did not advance	
Tania Mairi	Women's 10 metre air pistol	324	24	Did not advance	

== Squash ==
Papua New Guinea participated with 2 athletes (1 man and 1 woman).

Individual

Athlete	Event	Round of 64	Round of 32	Round of 16	Quarterfinals	Semifinals	Final	
Athlete	Event	Opposition Score	Opposition Score	Opposition Score	Opposition Score	Opposition Score	Opposition Score	Rank
Madako Junior Suari	Men's singles	Kawooya (UGA); L 0 - 3	Did not advance					
Lynette Vai	Women's singles	Bye	Chinappa (IND); L 0 - 3	Did not advance				

Doubles

Athlete	Event	Group stage			Round of 16	Quarterfinals	Semifinals	Final	
Athlete	Event	Opposition Score	Opposition Score	Rank	Opposition Score	Opposition Score	Opposition Score	Opposition Score	Rank
Lynette Vai; Madako Junior Suari	Mixed doubles	King / Coll (NZL); L 0 - 2	Kellas / Hindle (MLT); L 0 - 2	3	Did not advance				

== Swimming ==
Papua New Guinea participated with 4 athletes (4 men).

Men

Athlete	Event	Heat		Semifinal		Final	
Athlete	Event	Time	Rank	Time	Rank	Time	Rank
Ashley Seeto	50 m freestyle	25.42	49	Did not advance			
Samuel Seghers	50 m freestyle	24.25	35	Did not advance			
Josh Tarere	50 m freestyle	24.68	40	Did not advance			
Leonard Kalate	100 m freestyle	54.91	45	Did not advance			
Samuel Seghers	100 m freestyle	51.94	32	Did not advance			
Josh Tarere	100 m freestyle	56.12	49	Did not advance			
Samuel Seghers	200 m freestyle	1:56.68	23	—N/a		Did not advance	
Leonard Kalate	50 m breaststroke	30.97	26	Did not advance			
Ashley Seeto	50 m breaststroke	30.51	24	Did not advance			
Leonard Kalate	100 m breaststroke	1:08.11	22	Did not advance			
Ashley Seeto	100 m breaststroke	1:08.36	23	Did not advance			
Leonard Kalate	200 m breaststroke	2:30.23	14	—N/a		Did not advance	
Ashley Seeto	50 m butterfly	28.33	52	Did not advance			
Samuel Seghers	50 m butterfly	25.81	31	Did not advance			
Josh Tarere	50 m butterfly	27.43	45	Did not advance			
Josh Tarere; Samuel Seghers; Leonard Kalate; Ashley Seeto	4 × 100 m freestyle relay	3:43.29	10	—N/a		Did not advance	
Josh Tarere; Ashley Seeto; Samuel Seghers; Leonard Kalate	4 × 100 m medley relay	4:09.26	10	—N/a		Did not advance	

== Table tennis ==
Papua New Guinea participated with 2 athletes (1 man and 1 woman).

Singles

Athletes	Event	Group stage			Round of 64	Round of 32	Round of 16	Quarterfinal	Semifinal	Final	Rank
Athletes	Event	Opposition Score	Opposition Score	Rank	Opposition Score	Opposition Score	Opposition Score	Opposition Score	Opposition Score	Opposition Score	Rank
Geoffrey Loi	Men's singles	Nuopula (SOL); W 4 - 0	Pagarani (BIZ); W 4 - 0	1 Q	Bye	Desai (IND); L 0 - 4	Did not advance				

Para-sport

Athletes	Event	Group stage				Semifinal	Final	Rank
Athletes	Event	Opposition Score	Opposition Score	Opposition Score	Rank	Opposition Score	Opposition Score	Rank
Vero Nime	Women's TT6–10	Pickard (ENG); L 0 - 3	Sarkar (IND); L 0 - 3	Tapper (AUS); L 0 - 3	4	Did not advance		

== Triathlon ==
Papua New Guinea participated with 1 athlete (1 woman).

Individual

Athlete	Event	Swim (750 m)	Trans 1	Bike (20 km)	Trans 2	Run (5 km)	Total	Rank
Rachel James	Women's	11:38	0:46	34:48	0:38	22:30	1:10:20	20

== Weightlifting ==
Papua New Guinea qualified six weightlifters.

Athlete	Event	Snatch	Clean & jerk	Total	Rank
Morea Baru	Men's 62 kg	127	159	286	2nd place, silver medalist(s)
Toua Udia	Men's 77 kg	125	165	290	8
Steven Kari	Men's 94 kg	154	216	370	1st place, gold medalist(s)
Thelma Toua	Women's 48 kg	65	90	155	4
Dika Toua	Women's 53 kg	80	102	182	2nd place, silver medalist(s)
Lorraine Harry	Women's 90 kg	89	115	204	7

== See also ==
- Papua New Guinea at the 2018 Summer Youth Olympics
