= Lawn bowls at the 2018 Commonwealth Games – Women's pairs =

Lawn bowls – Women's pairs at the 2018 Commonwealth Games
- Venue: Broadbeach Bowls Club
- Dates: 9 – 13 April 2018
- Competitors: 42 from 21 nations

Medalists
gold medal	Emma Firyana Saroji; Siti Zalina	Malaysia
silver medal	Colleen Piketh; Nicolene Neal	South Africa
bronze medal	Claire Johnston; Lesley Doig	Scotland

Lawn bowls women's pairs at the 2018 Commonwealth Games was held at the Broadbeach Bowls Club in the Gold Coast, Australia, from April 9 to 13. A total of 42 athletes from 21 associations participated in the event. Malaysia's Emma Firyana Saroji and Siti Zalina won the gold medal, defeating Colleen Piketh and Nicolene Neal of South Africa in the final. Claire Johnston and Lesley Doig from Scotland won the bronze medal.

== Sectional play ==
The top two from each section advance to the knockout stage.

=== Section A ===
Rank	Nation	Athletes	MP	MW	MT	ML	FR	AG	PD	PTS
1	South Africa	Colleen Piketh & Nicolene Neal	4	4	0	0	85	52	33	12
2	India	Lovely Choubey & Rupa Rani Tirkey	4	2	0	2	73	62	11	6
3	Northern Ireland	Catherine Beattie & Sandra Bailie	4	2	0	2	67	60	6	6
4	Wales	Jess Sims & Laura Daniels	4	2	0	2	73	70	3	6
5	Jersey	Christine Grimes & Rachel MacDonald	4	0	0	4	40	94	-54	0

	South Africa	India	Northern Ireland	Wales	Jersey
South Africa	—	19–17	20–12	23–17	23–6
India	17–19	—	14–15	20–16	22–12
Northern Ireland	12–20	15–14	—	13–18	27–8
Wales	17–23	16–20	18–13	—	22–14
Jersey	6–23	12–22	8–27	14–22	—

=== Section B ===
Rank	Nation	Athletes	MP	MW	MT	ML	FR	AG	PD	PTS
1	Canada	Kelly McKerihen & Leanne Chinery	4	3	0	1	80	49	31	9
2	Norfolk Island	Carmen Anderson & Shae Wilson	4	3	0	1	66	45	21	9
3	New Zealand	Jo Edwards & Val Smith	4	2	0	2	73	60	13	6
4	Fiji	Doreen O'Connor & Sheral Mar	4	2	0	2	56	69	-13	6
5	Tonga	Caroline Dubois & Malia Kioa	4	0	0	4	39	91	-52	0

	Canada	Norfolk Island	New Zealand	Fiji	Tonga
Canada	—	12–14	18–16	30–7	20–12
Norfolk Island	14–12	—	20–11	11–12	21–10
New Zealand	16–18	11–20	—	17–16	29–6
Fiji	7–30	12–11	16–17	—	21–11
Tonga	12–20	10–21	6–29	11–21	—

=== Section C ===
Rank	Nation	Athletes	MP	MW	MT	ML	FR	AG	PD	PTS
1	Malaysia	Emma Firyana & Siti Zalina	4	4	0	0	108	34	74	12
2	Scotland	Claire Johnston & Lesley Doig	4	3	0	1	104	46	58	9
3	Brunei	Hajah Ajijah & Suhana Md Daud	4	2	0	2	64	85	-21	6
4	Botswana	Lephai Modutlwa & Nelly Senna	4	1	0	3	62	89	-27	3
5	Cook Islands	Emily Jim & Nooroa Mataio	4	0	0	4	40	124	-84	0

	Malaysia	Scotland	Brunei	Botswana	Cook Islands
Malaysia	—	18–11	28–10	29–7	33–6
Scotland	11–18	—	32–9	25–9	36–10
Brunei	10–28	9–32	—	19–17	26–8
Botswana	7–29	9–25	17–19	—	29–16
Cook Islands	6–33	10–36	8–26	16–29	—

=== Section D ===
Rank	Nation	Athletes	MP	MW	MT	ML	FR	AG	PD	PTS
1	Australia	Karen Murphy & Kelsey Cottrell	5	5	0	0	126	51	75	15
2	England	Natalie Chestney & Sophie Tolchard	5	4	0	1	112	57	55	12
3	Malta	Connie-Leigh Rixon & Rebecca Rixon	5	3	0	2	97	81	16	9
4	Zambia	Eddah Mpezeni & Foster Banda	5	2	0	3	64	101	-37	6
5	Papua New Guinea	Catherine Wimp & Rebecca Walo	5	1	0	4	74	91	-17	3
6	Niue	Cath Papani & Pau Blumsky	5	0	0	5	46	138	-92	0

	Australia	England	Malta	Zambia	Papua New Guinea	Niue
Australia	—	20–14	18–14	24–5	29–7	35–11
England	14–20	—	23–10	30–5	16–14	29–8
Malta	14–18	10–23	—	24–12	20–19	29–9
Zambia	5–24	5–30	12–24	—	18–13	24–10
Papua New Guinea	7–29	14–16	19–20	13–18	—	21–8
Niue	11–35	8–29	9–29	10–24	8–21	—

== Knockout stage ==
Quarterfinals
A1	South Africa	14
D2	England	12
D1	Australia	15
B2	Scotland	16
B1	Canada	21
C2	Norfolk Island	6
C1	Malaysia	17
A2	India	11

Semifinals
A1	South Africa	18
B2	Scotland	10
B1	Canada	8
C1	Malaysia	15

Finals
A1	South Africa	14
C1	Malaysia	15
Third place
B2	Scotland	18
B1	Canada	10
