= Squash at the 2014 Commonwealth Games – Men's doubles =

Men's doubles Squash 2014 Commonwealth Games
- 5th Men's doubles squash at the Commonwealth Games
- Location: Glasgow, Scotland
- Venue: Scotstoun Sports Campus
- Date: 29 July – 3 August 2014
- Website cwgsquash.net
- Category: XX Commonwealth Games

The Men's doubles event at the 2014 Commonwealth Games was held at the Scotstoun Sports Campus, Glasgow from 29 July to 3 August.

Cameron Pilley and David Palmer of Australia defeated Nick Matthew and Adrian Grant of England 10–11, 11–7, 11–9 to win the gold medal.

== Medalists ==
Gold	Cameron Pilley; Australia; David Palmer; Australia
Silver	Nick Matthew; England; Adrian Grant; England
Bronze	James Willstrop; England; Daryl Selby; England

== Seeds ==
1. Nick Matthew (ENG) Adrian Grant (ENG) (final)
2. Cameron Pilley (AUS) David Palmer (AUS) (champion)
3. James Willstrop (ENG) Daryl Selby (ENG) (semifinals)
4. Alan Clyne (SCO) Harry Leitch (SCO) (semifinals)
5. Campbell Grayson (NZL) Martin Knight (NZL) (round of 16)
6. Ryan Cuskelly (AUS) Matthew Karwalski (AUS) (quarterfinals)
7. Saurav Ghosal (IND) Harinder Pal Sandhu (IND) (round of 16)
8. Greg Lobban (SCO) Stuart Crawford (SCO) (quarterfinals)
9. Ivan Yuen (MAS) Valentino Bon Jovi Bong (MAS) (round of 16)
10. Peter Creed (WAL) David Evans (WAL) (quarterfinals)
11. Paul Coll (NZL) Lance Beddoes (NZL) (quarterfinals)
12. Micah Franklin (BER) Nicholas Kyme (BER) (round of 16)
13. David Haley (WAL) Scott Fitzgerald (WAL) (round of 16)
14. Mwinga Lengwe (ZAM) Kelvin Ndhlovu (ZAM) (round of 16)
15. Christopher Binnie (JAM) Bruce Burrowes (JAM) (round of 16)
16. Sunil Seth (GUY) Alexander Arjoon (GUY) (first round)

== Finals ==
Round of 16
1	Nick Matthew (ENG); Adrian Grant (ENG)	11	11
15	Christopher Binnie (JAM); Bruce Burrowes (JAM)	6	5
9	Ivan Yuen (MAS); Valentino Bong (MAS)	3	2
10	Peter Creed (WAL); David Evans (WAL)	11	11
6	Ryan Cuskelly (AUS); Matthew Karwalski (AUS)	11	11
12	Micah Franklin (BER); Nicholas Kyme (BER)	4	4
14	Mwinga Lengwe (ZAM); Kelvin Ndhlovu (ZAM)	4	4
4	Alan Clyne (SCO); Harry Leitch (SCO)	11	11
3	James Willstrop (ENG); Daryl Selby (ENG)	11	11
13	David Haley (WAL); Scott Fitzgerald (WAL)	1	9
11	Paul Coll (NZL); Lance Beddoes (NZL)	11	11
5	Campbell Grayson (NZL); Martin Knight (NZL)	7	10
8	Greg Lobban (SCO); Stuart Crawford (SCO)	11	8	11
7	Saurav Ghosal (IND); Harinder Pal Sandhu (IND)	5	11	9
Bradley Hindle (MLT); Daniel Zamit-Lewis (MLT)	4	3
2	Cameron Pilley (AUS); David Palmer (AUS)	11	11

Quarterfinals
1	Nick Matthew (ENG); Adrian Grant (ENG)	11	11
10	Peter Creed (WAL); David Evans (WAL)	9	4
6	Ryan Cuskelly (AUS); Matthew Karwalski (AUS)	7	5
4	Alan Clyne (SCO); Harry Leitch (SCO)	11	11
3	James Willstrop (ENG); Daryl Selby (ENG)	11	6	11
11	Paul Coll (NZL); Lance Beddoes (NZL)	8	11	9
8	Greg Lobban (SCO); Stuart Crawford (SCO)	9	5
2	Cameron Pilley (AUS); David Palmer (AUS)	11	11

Semifinals
1	Nick Matthew (ENG); Adrian Grant (ENG)	11	11
4	Alan Clyne (SCO); Harry Leitch (SCO)	7	2
3	James Willstrop (ENG); Daryl Selby (ENG)	4	4
2	Cameron Pilley (AUS); David Palmer (AUS)	11	11

Gold Medal Match
1	Nick Matthew (ENG); Adrian Grant (ENG)	11	7	9
2	Cameron Pilley (AUS); David Palmer (AUS)	10	11	11
Bronze Medal Match
4	Alan Clyne (SCO); Harry Leitch (SCO)	9	7
3	James Willstrop (ENG); Daryl Selby (ENG)	11	11

== Group stage ==
=== Pool A ===
Team	MP	MW	ML	MPO	GW	GL	GD	PW	PL	PD
Adrian Grant (ENG); Nick Matthew (ENG)	3	3	0	3	6	0	6	66	34	+32
Bradley Hindle (MLT); Daniel Zammit-Lewis (MLT)	3	2	1	2	4	2	2	55	42	+13
Alexander Arjoon (GUY); Sunil Seth (GUY)	3	1	2	1	2	4	-2	44	57	-13
Schubert Maketu (PNG); Moreina Wei (PNG)	3	0	3	0	0	6	-6	34	66	-32

29 July 11:30
Team	1	2	3	Match
Alexander Arjoon (GUY); Sunil Seth (GUY)	11	11		2
Moreina Wei (PNG); Schubert Maketu (PNG)	4	9		0
Report

29 July 12:00
Team	1	2	3	Match
Adrian Grant (ENG); Nick Matthew (ENG)	11	11		2
Bradley Hindle (MLT); Daniel Zammit-Lewis (MLT)	5	6		0
Report

29 July 18:00
Team	1	2	3	Match
Adrian Grant (ENG); Nick Matthew (ENG)	11	11		2
Alexander Arjoon (GUY); Sunil Seth (GUY)	5	5		0
Report

29 July 18:00
Team	1	2	3	Match
Bradley Hindle (MLT); Daniel Zammit-Lewis (MLT)	11	11		2
Moreina Wei (PNG); Schubert Maketu (PNG)	6	2		0
Report

30 July 17:30
Team	1	2	3	Match
Alexander Arjoon (GUY); Sunil Seth (GUY)	5	7		0
Bradley Hindle (MLT); Daniel Zammit-Lewis (MLT)	11	11		2
Report

30 July 18:00
Team	1	2	3	Match
Adrian Grant (ENG); Nick Matthew (ENG)	11	11		2
Moreina Wei (PNG); Schubert Maketu (PNG)	6	7		0
Report

=== Pool B ===
Team	MP	MW	ML	MPO	GW	GL	GD	PW	PL	PD
David Palmer (AUS); Cameron Pilley (AUS)	2	2	0	2	4	0	4	44	16	+28
Christopher Binnie (JAM); Bruce Burrowes (JAM)	2	1	1	1	2	3	-1	41	48	-7
Scott Gautier (JER); Nick Taylor (JER)	2	0	2	0	1	4	-3	32	53	-21

29 July 11:30
Team	1	2	3	Match
David Palmer (AUS); Cameron Pilley (AUS)	11	11		2
Nick Taylor (JER); Scott Gautier (JER)	2	4		0
Report

29 July 17:30
Team	1	2	3	Match
David Palmer (AUS); Cameron Pilley (AUS)	11	11		2
Christopher Binnie (JAM); Bruce Burrowes (JAM)	2	8		0
Report

30 July 17:30
Team	1	2	3	Match
Christopher Binnie (JAM); Bruce Burrowes (JAM)	9	11	11	2
Nick Taylor (JER); Scott Gautier (JER)	11	5	10	1
Report

=== Pool C ===
Team	MP	MW	ML	MPO	GW	GL	GD	PW	PL	PD
Daryl Selby (ENG); James Willstrop (ENG)	3	3	0	3	6	0	6	66	18	+48
Mwinga Lengwe (ZAM); Kelvin Ndhlovu (ZAM)	3	2	1	2	4	2	2	53	45	+8
Jason Doyle (SVG); Jules Snagg (SVG)	3	1	2	1	2	5	-3	45	74	-29
Anthony Brindle (GIB); Christian Navas (GIB)	3	0	3	0	1	6	-5	47	74	-27

29 July 12:00
Team	1	2	3	Match
Mwinga Lengwe (ZAM); Kelvin Ndhlovu (ZAM)	11	11		2
Jason Doyle (SVG); Jules Snagg (SVG)	3	8		0
Report

29 July 12:30
Team	1	2	3	Match
Daryl Selby (ENG); James Willstrop (ENG)	11	11		2
Anthony Brindle (GIB); Christian Navas (GIB)	1	4		0
Report

29 July 17:30
Team	1	2	3	Match
Daryl Selby (ENG); James Willstrop (ENG)	11	11		2
Mwinga Lengwe (ZAM); Kelvin Ndhlovu (ZAM)	3	6		0
Report

29 July 17:30
Team	1	2	3	Match
Anthony Brindle (GIB); Christian Navas (GIB)	9	11	10	1
Jason Doyle (SVG); Jules Snagg (SVG)	11	8	11	2
Report

30 July 17:30
Team	1	2	3	Match
Daryl Selby (ENG); James Willstrop (ENG)	11	11		2
James Doyle (SVG); Jules Snagg (SVG)	2	2		0
Report

30 July 17:30
Team	1	2	3	Match
Mwinga Lengwe (ZAM); Kelvin Ndhlovu (ZAM)	11	11		2
Anthony Brindle (GIB); Christian Navas (GIB)	9	3		0
Report

=== Pool D ===
Team	MP	MW	ML	MPO	GW	GL	GD	PW	PL	PD
Alan Clyne (SCO); Harry Leitch (SCO)	2	2	0	2	4	0	4	44	13	+31
Scott Fitzgerald (WAL); David Haley (WAL)	2	1	1	1	2	2	0	28	31	-3
Colin Ramasra (TTO); Kale Wilson (TTO)	2	0	2	0	0	4	-4	16	44	-28

29 July 12:30
Team	1	2	3	Match
Alan Clyne (SCO); Harry Leitch (SCO)	11	11		2
Colin Ramasra (TTO); Kale Wilson (TTO)	3	4		0
Report

29 July 17:30
Team	1	2	3	Match
Alan Clyne (SCO); Harry Leitch (SCO)	11	11		2
Scott Fitzgerald (WAL); David Haley (WAL)	3	3		0
Report

30 July 17:30
Team	1	2	3	Match
Scott Fitzgerald (WAL); David Haley (WAL)	11	11		2
Colin Ramasra (TTO); Kale Wilson (TTO)	3	6		0
Report

=== Pool E ===
Team	MP	MW	ML	MPO	GW	GL	GD	PW	PL	PD
Campbell Grayson (NZL); Martin Knight (NZL)	2	2	0	2	4	0	4	44	8	+36
Micah Franklin (BER); Nicholas Kyme (BER)	2	1	1	1	2	2	0	30	22	+8
James Fayia (SLE); Issa Kamara (SLE)	2	0	2	0	0	4	-4	0	44	-44

29 July 11:30
Team	1	2	3	Match
Campbell Grayson (NZL); Martin Knight (NZL)	X	X	X	X
Issa Kamara (SLE); James Fayia (SLE)	w/o	w/o	w/o	w/o
Report

29 July 18:00
Team	1	2	3	Match
Campbell Grayson (NZL); Martin Knight (NZL)	11	11		2
Micah Franklin (BER); Nicholas Kyme (BER)	5	3		0
Report

30 July 18:00
Team	1	2	3	Match
Micah Franklin (BER); Nicholas Kyme (BER)	X	X	X	X
Issa Kamara (SLE); James Fayia (SLE)	w/o	w/o	w/o	w/o
Report

=== Pool F ===
Team	MP	MW	ML	MPO	GW	GL	GD	PW	PL	PD
Ryan Cuskelly (AUS); Matthew Karwalski (AUS)	3	3	0	3	6	0	6	66	29	+37
Lance Beddoes (NZL); Paul Coll (NZL)	3	2	1	2	4	2	2	57	34	+23
Dilshan Gunawardena (SRI); Gihan Suharis (SRI)	3	1	2	1	2	5	-3	47	68	-21
Mitchell Graham (NFI); Duncan Gray (NFI)	3	0	3	0	1	6	-5	37	76	-39

29 July 12:00
Team	1	2	3	Match
Matthew Karwalski (AUS); Ryan Cuskelly (AUS)	11	11		2
Dilshan Gunawardena (SRI); Gihan Suharis (SRI)	3	4		0
Report

29 July 12:00
Team	1	2	3	Match
Lance Beddoes (NZL); Paul Coll (NZL)	11	11		2
Mitchell Graham (NFI); Duncan Gray (NFI)	3	1		0
Report

29 July 17:30
Team	1	2	3	Match
Matthew Karwalski (AUS); Ryan Cuskelly (AUS)	11	11		2
Lance Beddoes (NZL); Paul Coll (NZL)	5	8		0
Report

29 July 18:00
Team	1	2	3	Match
Dilshan Gunawardane (SRI); Gihan Suharis (SRI)	10	11	11	2
Mitchell Graham (NFI); Duncan Grey (NFI)	11	10	3	1
Report

30 July 18:00
Team	1	2	3	Match
Matthew Karwalski (AUS); Ryan Cuskelly (AUS)	11	11		2
Mitchell Graham (NFI); Duncan Gray (NFI)	8	1		0
Report

30 July 18:00
Team	1	2	3	Match
Lance Beddoes (NZL); Paul Coll (NZL)	11	11		2
Dilshan Gunawardane (SRI); Gihan Suharis (SRI)	8	0		0
Report

=== Pool G ===
Team	MP	MW	ML	MPO	GW	GL	GD	PW	PL	PD
Peter Creed (WAL); David Evans (WAL)	3	3	0	3	6	0	6	66	19	+47
Saurav Ghosal (IND); Harinder Pal Sandhu (IND)	3	2	1	2	4	3	1	64	48	+16
Malton Blair (CAY); Julian Jervis (CAY)	3	1	2	1	3	4	-1	44	71	-27
Paul Kadoma (UGA); Michael Kawooya (UGA)	3	0	3	0	0	6	-6	30	66	-36

29 July 11:30
Team	1	2	3	Match
Peter Creed (WAL); David Evans (WAL)	11	11		2
Paul Kadoma (UGA); Michael Kawooya (UGA)	1	1		0
Report

29 July 12:00
Team	1	2	3	Match
Saurav Ghosal (IND); Harinder Pal Sandhu (IND)	9	11	11	2
Julian Jervis (CAY); Malton Blair (CAY)	11	3	2	1
Report

29 July 18:00
Team	1	2	3	Match
Saurav Ghosal (IND); Harinder Pal Sandhu (IND)	8	3		0
Peter Creed (WAL); David Evans (WAL)	11	11		2
Report

29 July 18:30
Team	1	2	3	Match
Julian Jervis (CAY); Malton Blair (CAY)	11	11		2
Paul Kadoma (UGA); Michael Kawooya (UGA)	8	10		0
Report

30 July 18:00
Team	1	2	3	Match
Saurav Ghosal (IND); Harinder Pal Sandhu (IND)	11	11		2
Paul Kadoma (UGA); Michael Kawooya (UGA)	7	3		0
Report

30 July 18:30
Team	1	2	3	Match
Peter Creed (WAL); David Evans (WAL)	11	11		2
Julian Jervis (CAY); Malton Blair (CAY)	1	5		0
Report

=== Pool H ===
Team	MP	MW	ML	MPO	GW	GL	GD	PW	PL	PD
Stuart Crawford (SCO); Greg Lobban (SCO)	3	3	0	3	6	1	5	75	31	+44
Valentino Bon Jovi Bong (MAS); Ivan Yuen (MAS)	3	2	1	2	5	2	3	69	43	+26
James Bentick (SVG); Kevin Hannaway (SVG)	3	1	2	1	2	4	-2	35	60	-25
Suari Madoko Jr. Suari (PNG); Kerry Walsh (PNG)	3	0	3	0	0	6	-6	21	66	-45

29 July 11:30
Team	1	2	3	Match
Stuart Crawford (SCO); Greg Lobban (SCO)	11	11		2
James Bentick (SVG); Kevin Hannaway (SVG)	2	1		0
Report

29 July 12:30
Team	1	2	3	Match
Valentino Bon Jovi Bong (MAS); Ivan Yuen (MAS)	11	11		2
Suari Madoko Jr. Suari (PNG); Kerry Walsh (PNG)	1	1		0
Report

29 July 18:30
Team	1	2	3	Match
Stuart Crawford (SCO); Greg Lobban (SCO)	9	11	11	2
Valentino Bon Jovi Bong (MAS); Ivan Yuen (MAS)	11	5	9	1
Report

29 July 18:30
Team	1	2	3	Match
James Bentick (SVG); Kevin Hannaway (SVG)	11	11		2
Suari Madoko Jr. Suari (PNG); Kerry Walsh (PNG)	9	7		0
Report

30 July 18:30
Team	1	2	3	Match
Stuart Crawford (SCO); Greg Lobban (SCO)	11	11		2
Suari Madoko Jr. Suari (PNG); Kerry Walsh (PNG)	1	2		0
Report

30 July 18:30
Team	1	2	3	Match
Valentino Bon Jovi Bong (MAS); Ivan Yuen (MAS)	11	11		2
James Bentick (SVG); Kevin Hannaway (SVG)	4	6		0
Report
