= Malta at the 2010 Commonwealth Games =

- CGF code: MLT
- CGA: Malta Olympic Committee
- Website: www.nocmalta.org

in Delhi, India
- Flag bearers: Opening: Rebecca Madyson; Closing:
- Medals: Gold 0 Silver 0 Bronze 0 Total 0

Commonwealth Games appearances (overview)
- 1958; 1962; 1966; 1970; 1974–1978; 1982; 1986; 1990; 1994; 1998; 2002; 2006; 2010; 2014; 2018; 2022; 2026; 2030

Malta competed in the 2010 Commonwealth Games held in Delhi, India, from 3 to 14 October 2010.

== Athletics ==
=== Women ===
Track

Athlete(s)	Events	Round 1		Round 2		Round 3		Semifinal		Final
Athlete(s)	Events	Result	Rank	Result	Rank	Result	Rank	Result	Rank	
Rebecca Camilleri	Long jump	5.95								

== Lawn Bowls ==
Team Malta consisted of 7 lawn bowls players.

Men

Event	Player(s)	Rank
Men's Singles	Shaun Parnis	7th
Men's Pairs	Brendan Aquilina; Frank Vella	4th
Men's Triples	Mick Debono; Joe Saragozza; Lennie Callus	10th

Women

Event	Player(s)	Rank
Women's Singles	Carmen Spiteri	1st

== See also ==
- 2010 Commonwealth Games
