= Malta at the 2014 Commonwealth Games =

- CG code: MLT
- CGA: Malta Olympic Committee
- Website: www.nocmalta.org

in Glasgow, Scotland
- Competitors: 29 in 9 sports
- Flag bearer: Kevin Arthur Moore
- Medals: Gold 0 Silver 0 Bronze 0 Total 0

Commonwealth Games appearances (overview)
- 1958; 1962; 1966; 1970; 1974–1978; 1982; 1986; 1990; 1994; 1998; 2002; 2006; 2010; 2014; 2018; 2022; 2026; 2030

Malta competed in the 2014 Commonwealth Games in Glasgow, Scotland from July 23 to August 3, 2014.

== Athletics ==
Key

- Note–Ranks given for track events are within the athlete's heat only
- Q = Qualified for the next round
- q = Qualified for the next round as a fastest loser or, in field events, by position without achieving the qualifying target
- NR = National record
- N/A = Round not applicable for the event

Men
Track & road events

Athlete	Event	Heat		Semifinal		Final	
Athlete	Event	Result	Rank	Result	Rank	Result	Rank
Kevin Moore	200 m	21.07	28	Did not advance			

Women
Track & road events

Athlete	Event	Heat		Semifinal		Final	
Athlete	Event	Result	Rank	Result	Rank	Result	Rank
Diane Borg	100 m	12.12	31	Did not advance			
Diane Borg	200 m	24.74	26	Did not advance			
Diane Borg; Rebecca Camilleri; Rachel Fitz; Jenet Richard; Rebecca Sare; Annalise Vassallo	4 × 100 m relay	46.75	11	—N/a		Did not advance	

Field events

Athlete	Event	Qualification		Final	
Athlete	Event	Distance	Position	Distance	Position
Rebecca Camilleri	Long jump	6.31	9 q	6.23	9
Rebecca Sare	Triple jump	12.26	17	Did not advance	

== Gymnastics ==
=== Artistic ===
Women

Athlete	Event	Final					
Athlete	Event	Apparatus				Total	Rank
Athlete	Event	F	V	UB	BB	Total	Rank
Kristy Catuana	Team	11.466	12.666	7.433	10.400	41.965	
Peppijna Dalli	Team		11.800	8.666			
Adreana Zammit	Team	9.766	11.233		9.200		
Total	Team	21.232	35.699	16.099	19.600	92.630	14

Individuals

Athlete	Event	Qualification						Final					
Athlete	Event	Apparatus				Total	Rank	Apparatus				Total	Rank
Athlete	Event	F	V	UB	BB	Total	Rank	F	V	UB	BB	Total	Rank
Kristy Catuana	Individual	11.466	12.666	7.433	10.400	41.965	35	Did not advance					

== Judo ==
Men

Athlete	Event	Round of 32	Round of 16	Quarterfinal	Semifinal	Repechage	Final / BM	Rank
Athlete	Event	Opposition Result	Opposition Result	Opposition Result	Opposition Result	Opposition Result	Opposition Result	Rank
Jeremy Saywell	−66 kg	M Nandal (IND); L 0011–1001	Did not advance					
Isaac Bezzina	−90 kg	—N/a	M Anthony (AUS); L 0011–1020	Did not advance				

Women

Athlete	Event	Round of 16	Quarterfinal	Semifinal	Repechage	Final / BM	Rank
Athlete	Event	Opposition Result	Opposition Result	Opposition Result	Opposition Result	Opposition Result	Rank
Marcon Bezzina	−63 kg	Bye	H Wezeu Dombeu (CMR); L 0000–0003	Did not advance	F Pitman (ENG); L 0000–1000	Did not advance	7

== Lawn bowls ==
Men

Athlete	Event	Group stage		Quarterfinal	Semifinal	Final	Rank
Athlete	Event	Opposition Score	Rank	Opposition Score	Opposition Score	Opposition Score	Rank
Leonard Callus	Singles	de Sousa (JER); L 18 – 21; Christian (NFI); W 21 – 14; McIlroy (NZL); L 2 – 21; Juni (PNG); W 21 – 10; McHugh (NIR); L 10 – 21; Gabriel (SAM); W 21 – 20	4	Did not advance			
John Borg; Leonard Callus	Pairs	Northern Ireland; W 18 - 16; Samoa; L 15 - 18; Canada; W 20 - 6 Papua New Guinea; W 18 - 16; Malaysia; L 7 - 28	3	Did not advance			

Women

Athlete	Event	Group stage		Quarterfinal	Semifinal	Final	Rank
Athlete	Event	Opposition Score	Rank	Opposition Score	Opposition Score	Opposition Score	Rank
Carmela Spiteri	Singles	Melmore (ENG); L 7 – 21; Ndungu (KEN); L 3 – 21; Greechan (JER); L 20 – 21; McMillen (NIR); L 15 – 21; Adam (SAM); W 21 – 12	5	Did not advance			

== Shooting ==
Men

Athlete	Event	Qualification		Semifinals		Final	
Athlete	Event	Points	Rank	Points	Rank	Points	Rank
Brian Galea	Trap	109	11	Did not advance			
William Chetcuti	Double trap	125	7	Did not advance			
Nathan Xuereb	Double trap	131	5 Q	26	4 Q	24	4

Women

Athlete	Event	Qualification		Final	
Athlete	Event	Points	Rank	Points	Rank
Eleanor Bezzina	10 metre air pistol	372	13	Did not advance	

== Squash ==
Individual

Athlete	Event	Round of 128	Round of 64	Round of 32	Round of 16	Quarterfinals	Semifinals	Final	Rank
Athlete	Event	Opposition Score	Opposition Score	Opposition Score	Opposition Score	Opposition Score	Opposition Score	Opposition Score	Rank
Bradley Hindle	Men's Singles	Bye	S Fitzgerald (WAL); W 3–0	I Yuen (MAS); L 1–3	Did not advance				
Daniel Zammit-Lewis	Men's Singles	Bye	S Seth (GUY); L 0–3	Did not advance					
Kimberley Borg Cauchi	Women's Singles	—N/a	D Saffery (WAL); L 0–3	Did not advance					
Colette Sultana	Women's Singles	—N/a	M Methsarani (SRI); L 2–3	Did not advance					

Doubles

Athlete	Event	Group stage				Round of 16	Quarterfinal	Semifinal	Final	Rank
Athlete	Event	Opposition Score	Opposition Score	Opposition Score	Rank	Opposition Score	Opposition Score	Opposition Score	Opposition Score	Rank
Bradley Hindle; Daniel Zammit-Lewis	Men's doubles	England; L 0 - 2	Papua New Guinea; W 2 - 0	Guyana; W 2 - 0	2 Q	Australia; L 0 - 2	Did not advance			
Kimberley Borg Cauchi; Colette Sultana	Women's doubles	Australia; L 0 - 2	Malaysia; L 0 - 2	Australia; L 0 - 2	4	—N/a	Did not advance			
Colette Sultana; Daniel Zammit-Lewis	Mixed doubles	Wales; L 0 - 2	Trinidad and Tobago; W 2 - 0	England; L 0 - 2	3	Did not advance				

== Triathlon ==
Individual

Athlete	Event	Swim (1.5 km)	Trans 1	Bike (40 km)	Trans 2	Run (10 km)	Total Time	Rank
Keith Galea	Men's	23:18	0:45	Lapped				
Danica Bonello Spiteri	Women's	22:55	0:40	1:14:15	0:27	42:57	2:21:14	15

== Weightlifting ==
Women

Athlete	Event	Snatch		Clean & jerk		Total	Rank
Athlete	Event	Result	Rank	Result	Rank	Total	Rank
Jessica Edge	−53 kg	64	12	81	12	145	12

== Wrestling ==
Key:

- VT - Victory by Fall.
- PP - Decision by Points - the loser with technical points.
- PO - Decision by Points - the loser without technical points.

Men's freestyle

Athlete	Event	Round of 32	Round of 16	Quarterfinal	Semifinal	Repechage	Final / BM	Rank
Athlete	Event	Opposition Result	Opposition Result	Opposition Result	Opposition Result	Opposition Result	Opposition Result	Rank
Adam Vella	−61 kg	—N/a	D Tremblay (CAN); L 1–4	Did not advance		A Sengui (CMR); W 5–0	V Etko (SCO); L 0–4	5
David Galea	−74 kg	Bye	I Tokia (KIR); W 5–0	Q Abbas (PAK); L 0–4	Did not advance	K Tebitara (SOL); W 3–0	M Grungy (ENG); L 0–4	5
