= Swimming at the 2018 Commonwealth Games – Men's 100 metre breaststroke =

Men's 100 metre breaststroke at the 2018 Commonwealth Games
- Venue: Gold Coast Aquatic Centre
- Dates: 6 April (heats, semifinals); 7 April (final)
- Competitors: 30 from 19 nations
- Winning time: 58.84

Medalists
gold medal	Adam Peaty	England
silver medal	James Wilby	England
bronze medal	Cameron van der Burgh	South Africa

The men's 100 metre breaststroke event at the 2018 Commonwealth Games was held on 6 and 7 April at the Gold Coast Aquatic Centre.

== Records ==
Prior to this competition, the existing world, Commonwealth and Games records were as follows:

World record	Adam Peaty (GBR)	57.13	Rio de Janeiro, Brazil	7 August 2016
Commonwealth record	Adam Peaty (GBR)	57.13	Rio de Janeiro, Brazil	7 August 2016
Games record	Adam Peaty (ENG)	58.94	Glasgow, United Kingdom	26 July 2014

The following records were established during the competition:

Date	Event	Name	Nationality	Time	Record
6 April	Semifinal	Adam Peaty	England	58.59	GR

== Results ==
=== Heats ===
The heats were held on 6 April at 11:00.

Rank	Heat	Lane	Name	Nationality	Time	Notes
1	4	4	Adam Peaty	England	59.14	Q
2	2	5	James Wilby	England	59.80	Q
3	2	4	Cameron van der Burgh	South Africa	1:00.20	Q
4	3	5	Jake Packard	Australia	1:00.29	Q
4	4	3	Matt Wilson	Australia	1:00.29	Q
6	3	4	Ross Murdoch	Scotland	1:00.92	Q
7	2	3	Andrew Willis	England	1:01.13	Q
8	4	5	Craig Benson	Scotland	1:01.63	Q
9	2	6	Michael Houlie	South Africa	1:01.66	Q
10	4	6	Elijah Wall	Canada	1:01.77	Q
11	3	3	Liam Hunter	Australia	1:02.17	Q
12	4	2	Calum Tait	Scotland	1:02.61	Q
13	3	2	Taichi Vakasama Taichi	Fiji	1:04.25	Q
14	3	7	Guy Davies	Isle of Man	1:04.88	Q
15	2	2	Epeli Rabua Herbert	Fiji	1:05.46	Q
16	4	7	Ludovico Corsini	Mozambique	1:05.83	Q
17	1	5	Samuele Rossi	Seychelles	1:06.25	
18	3	1	Alexandros Axiotis	Zambia	1:06.49	
19	2	8	Ahllan Bique	Mozambique	1:07.29	
20	3	8	Mohammad Islam	Bangladesh	1:07.51	
21	4	1	Jonathan Chung Yee	Mauritius	1:07.92	
22	2	1	Leonard Kalate	Papua New Guinea	1:08.11	
23	4	8	Ashley Seeto	Papua New Guinea	1:08.36	
24	2	7	Corey Ollivierre	Grenada	1:08.59	
25	1	3	Jadon Wuilliez	Antigua and Barbuda	1:09.17	
26	1	4	David Ebanks	Cayman Islands	1:09.55	
27	1	6	Nikolas Sylvester	Saint Vincent and the Grenadines	1:11.60	
28	1	7	Colby Thomas	Saint Helena	1:22.77	
29	1	2	Scott George	Saint Helena	1:31.57	
	3	6	Jamie Graham	Northern Ireland	DSQ	

=== Semifinals ===
The semifinals were held on 6 April at 20:32.

==== Semifinal 1 ====
Rank	Lane	Name	Nationality	Time	Notes
1	4	James Wilby	England	59.69	Q
2	5	Jake Packard	Australia	1:00.01	Q
3	3	Ross Murdoch	Scotland	1:00.07	Q
4	6	Craig Benson	Scotland	1:00.43	Q
5	2	Elijah Wall	Canada	1:01.47	
6	7	Calum Tait	Scotland	1:01.62	
7	1	Guy Davies	Isle of Man	1:04.91	
8	8	Ludovico Corsini	Mozambique	1:05.07	

==== Semifinal 2 ====
Rank	Lane	Name	Nationality	Time	Notes
1	4	Adam Peaty	England	58.59	Q, GR
2	5	Cameron van der Burgh	South Africa	59.74	Q
3	3	Matt Wilson	Australia	59.89	Q
4	6	Andrew Willis	England	1:01.29	Q
5	7	Liam Hunter	Australia	1:01.45	
6	2	Michael Houlie	South Africa	1:01.47	
7	1	Taichi Vakasama Taichi	Fiji	1:04.39	
8	8	Epeli Rabua Herbert	Fiji	1:05.09	

=== Final ===
The final was held on 7 April at 19:48.

Rank	Lane	Name	Nationality	Time	Notes
1st place, gold medalist(s)	4	Adam Peaty	England	58.84	
2nd place, silver medalist(s)	5	James Wilby	England	59.43	
3rd place, bronze medalist(s)	3	Cameron van der Burgh	South Africa	59.44	
4	2	Jake Packard	Australia	59.70	
5	7	Ross Murdoch	Scotland	59.89	
6	1	Craig Benson	Scotland	1:00.42	
7	6	Matt Wilson	Australia	1:00.48	
8	8	Andrew Willis	England	1:01.13	
