= Malta at the 2018 Commonwealth Games =

- Flag of Malta
- CG code: MLT
- CGA: Malta Olympic Committee
- Website: www.nocmalta.org

in Gold Coast, Australia 4 April 2018 – 15 April 2018
- Competitors: 24 in 8 sports
- Flag bearer: Gary Giordimaina
- Medals Ranked 37th: Gold 0 Silver 0 Bronze 2 Total 2

Commonwealth Games appearances (overview)
- 1958; 1962; 1966; 1970; 1974–1978; 1982; 1986; 1990; 1994; 1998; 2002; 2006; 2010; 2014; 2018; 2022; 2026; 2030

Malta competed at the 2018 Commonwealth Games in the Gold Coast, Australia from April 4 to April 15, 2018.

Malta's team consisted of 25 athletes (15 men and 10 women) that competed in eight sports. However, only 24 athletes (14 men and 10 women) competed.

Wrestler Gary Giordimaina was the country's flag bearer during the opening ceremony.

== Medalists ==
Medal	Name	Sport	Event	Date
Bronze	Sharon Callus; Connie-Leigh Rixon; Rebecca Rixon; Rosemaree Rixon	Lawn bowls	Women's Fours	April 9
Bronze	Brian Galea	Shooting	Men's Trap	April 14

== Competitors ==
The following is the list of number of competitors participating at the Games per sport/discipline.

Sport	Men	Women	Total
Athletics (track and field)	2	1	3
Cycling	2	0	2
Gymnastics	0	1	1
Lawn bowls	2	4	6
Shooting	4	1	5
Squash	2	2	4
Weightlifting	0	1	1
Wrestling	2	0	2
Total	14	10	24

== Athletics (track and field) ==
Malta entered three athletes (two men and one woman).

Men
Field events

Athlete	Event	Qualification		Final	
Athlete	Event	Distance	Rank	Distance	Rank
Andrew Cassar Torreggiani	Long jump	6.87	24	Did not advance	
Ian Grech	Long jump	7.43	18	Did not advance	

Women
Track & road events

Athlete	Event	Heat		Semifinal		Final	
Athlete	Event	Result	Rank	Result	Rank	Result	Rank
Charlotte Wingfield	100 m	11.99	6	Did not advance			
Charlotte Wingfield	200 m	24.40	6	Did not advance			

== Cycling ==
Malta entered two male cyclists.

=== Road ===
Men

Athlete	Event	Time	Rank
David Treacy Schembri	Road race	DNF	
Alexander Smyth	Road race	DNF	

== Gymnastics ==
Malta entered one female gymnast.

=== Artistic ===
Women
Individual Qualification

Athlete	Event	Apparatus				Total	Rank
Athlete	Event	V	UB	BB	F	Total	Rank
Sana Grillo	Qualification	12.250	7.950	11.200	9.950	41.350	26

== Lawn bowls ==
Malta entered six lawn bowlers (two men and four women).

Men

Athlete	Event	Group stage						Quarterfinal	Semifinal	Final / BM	
Athlete	Event	Opposition Score	Opposition Score	Opposition Score	Opposition Score	Opposition Score	Rank	Opposition Score	Opposition Score	Opposition Score	Rank
Brendan Aquilina	Singles	Breitenbach (RSA); L 17 - 21	Wilson (AUS); L 17 - 21	Salmon (WAL); L 18 - 21	Jones (NFI); W 21 - 15	Paniani (COK); W 21 - 17	4	Did not advance			
Brendan Aquilina; Shaun Parnis	Pairs	Australia; L 11–22	Brunei; W 28–11	Guernsey; W 16–10	Canada; W 26–12	—N/a	2 Q	Australia; W 15–13	Scotland; L 8-18	Cook Islands; L 11-17	4

Women

Athlete	Event	Group stage						Quarterfinal	Semifinal	Final / BM	
Athlete	Event	Opposition Score	Opposition Score	Opposition Score	Opposition Score	Opposition Score	Rank	Opposition Score	Opposition Score	Opposition Score	Rank
Connie-Leigh Rixon; Rebecca Rixon	Pairs	Niue; W 29-9	England; L 10-23	Australia; L 14-18	Zambia; W 24-12	Papua New Guinea; W 20-19	3	Did not advance			
Sharon Callus; Connie-Leigh Rixon; Rebecca Rixon; Rosemaree Rixon	Fours	England; W 14–10	India; W 20–15	Fiji; L 12–20	Northern Ireland; W 21–8	—N/a	2 Q	India; W 13–11	South Africa; L 8-14	Canada; W 17-8	3rd place, bronze medalist(s)

== Shooting ==
Malta entered five sport shooters (four men and one woman).

Men

Athlete	Event	Qualification		Final	
Athlete	Event	Points	Rank	Points	Rank
Brian Galea	Trap	117	6 Q	36	3rd place, bronze medalist(s)
William Chetcuti	Double trap	130	9	Did not advance	
Nathan-Lee Xuereb	Double trap	125	12	Did not advance	
Marlon Attard	Skeet	116	12	Did not advance	

Women

Athlete	Event	Qualification		Final	
Athlete	Event	Points	Rank	Points	Rank
Eleanor Bezzina	25 metre pistol	571	7 Q	22	4
Eleanor Bezzina	10 metre air pistol	378	3 Q	193.2	4

== Squash ==
Malta entered four squash athletes (two per gender).

Individual

Athlete	Event	Round of 64	Round of 32	Round of 16	Quarterfinals	Semifinals	Final	
Athlete	Event	Opposition Score	Opposition Score	Opposition Score	Opposition Score	Opposition Score	Opposition Score	Rank
Daniel Zammit-Lewis	Men's singles	Kale Wilson (TRI); W 3–0	Lewis Walters (JAM); L 0–3	Did not advance				
Dianne Kellas	Women's singles	—N/a	Christine Nunn (AUS); L 0–3	Did not advance				
Colette Sultana	Women's singles	Samantha Hennings (CAY); W 3–0	Nicol David (MAS); L 0–3	Did not advance				

Doubles

Athlete	Event	Group stage				Round of 16	Quarterfinals	Semifinals	Final	
Athlete	Event	Opposition Score	Opposition Score	Opposition Score	Rank	Opposition Score	Opposition Score	Opposition Score	Opposition Score	Rank
Bradley Hindle; Daniel Zammit-Lewis	Men's doubles	Coll / Grayson (NZL); L 0 - 2	Doyle / Snagg (SVG); W 2 - 0	—N/a	2 Q	James / Willstrop (ENG); L 0 - 2	Did not advance			
Dianne Kellas; Colette Sultana	Women's doubles	Evans / Deon (WAL); L 0 - 2	F Zafar / M Zafar (PAK); W 2 - 0	Chinappa / Pallikal Karthik (IND); L 0 - 2	3	—N/a	Did not advance			
Dianne Kellas; Bradley Hindle	Mixed doubles	Vai / Suari (PNG); W 2 - 0	King / Coll (NZL); L 0 - 2	—N/a	2 Q	Waters / Selby (ENG); L 0 - 2	Did not advance			
Colette Sultana; Daniel Zammit-Lewis	Mixed doubles	Landers-Murphy / Millar (NZL); L 0 - 2	Duncalf / Waller (ENG); L 0 - 2	—N/a	3	Did not advance				

== Weightlifting ==
Malta qualified one weightlifter.

Athlete	Event	Snatch		Clean & jerk		Total	Rank
Athlete	Event	Result	Rank	Result	Rank	Total	Rank
Yasmin Zammit-Stevens	Women's −63 kg	79	7	95	7	174	7

== Wrestling ==
Malta entered three male wrestlers. However, David Galea did not compete.

Men

Athlete	Event	Round of 16	Quarterfinal	Semifinal	Repechage	Final / BM	
Athlete	Event	Opposition Result	Opposition Result	Opposition Result	Opposition Result	Opposition Result	Rank
Gary Giordmaina	-57 kg	Bilal (PAK); L 1 - 4	Did not advance				11
Adam Vella	-65 kg	Wahab (PAK); L 1 - 4	Did not advance				8

== See also ==
- Malta at the 2018 Summer Youth Olympics
