= Malta at the 2006 Commonwealth Games =

- CGF code: MLT
- CGA: Malta Olympic Committee
- Website: www.nocmalta.org

in Melbourne, Australia
- Competitors: 36
- Flag bearers: Opening: Closing: Rebecca Madyson
- Medals Ranked 27th: Gold 0 Silver 1 Bronze 1 Total 2

Commonwealth Games appearances (overview)
- 1958; 1962; 1966; 1970; 1974–1978; 1982; 1986; 1990; 1994; 1998; 2002; 2006; 2010; 2014; 2018; 2022; 2026; 2030

Malta CGA logo for the Melbourne Commonwealth Games

Malta sent a team of 35 athletes to the 2006 Commonwealth Games in Melbourne.

Malta had won two bronze medals at previous Commonwealth Games.

== Medals ==
	(gold)	(silver)	(bronze)	Total
Malta	0	1	1	2

=== Silver ===
Shooting:

Rebecca Attard Madyson, Women's Trap Singles

=== Bronze ===
Shooting:

William Chetcuti, Men's Double Trap

== Malta's Commonwealth Games Team 2006 ==
=== Basketball ===
==== Women's ====
- Caroline Fenech
- Kirsten Micallef
- Doreen Parnis
- Wismay Schembri
- Bever Lee Zammit
- Dawn Aquilina
- Antoinette Borg
- Lucienne Bezzina
- Fiona Schembri
- Josephine Grima
- Sara Pace
- Rachel Camilleri

=== Cycling ===
- Nick Formosa
- David Treacy
- Jack Schiavone
- Etienne Bonello
- Stephania Magri

=== Lawn bowls ===
==== Men's ====
- Joe Attard
- Leonard Callus
- Shaun J Parnis
- Victor A Brincat
- Alfred J Vella
- Francis M Vella

=== Shooting ===
==== Double Trap ====
- William Chetcuti
- Rodney Micallef

==== Trap ====
- Frans Pace
- Stanley Cardona

=== Squash ===
- Joe Desira (Men's singles)

=== Swimming ===
- Angela Galea (Women's Butterfly at 50m, 100m & 200m)

=== Table tennis ===
- Simon Gerada & Wayne Gerada (Men's doubles)

=== Weightlifting ===
- Lindsay Borg (Women's 75 kg)
- Rebecca Aquilina (women's 75 kg)
- Sharne Hawkins (women's 82.5 kg)
