= Julie Thomas =

Julie Thomas may refer to:

- Julie Thomas (bowls), Welsh lawn bowls player
- Julie Thomas (politician), chief minister of Saint Helena

== See also ==
- Julia Thomas (died 1879), British murder victim
