= Lawn bowls at the 2018 Commonwealth Games – Women's fours =

Lawn bowls – Women's fours at the 2018 Commonwealth Games
- Venue: Broadbeach Bowls Club
- Dates: 5 – 9 April 2018
- Competitors: 76 from 19 nations

Medalists
gold medal	Carla Krizanic; Kelsey Cottrell; Natasha Scott; Rebecca Van Asch	Australia
silver medal	Elma Davis; Esme Kruger; Johanna Snyman; Nicolene Neal	South Africa
bronze medal	Connie-Leigh Rixon; Rebecca Rixon; Rosemaree Rixon; Sharon Callus	Malta

Lawn bowls women's fours at the 2018 Commonwealth Games was held at the Broadbeach Bowls Club in the Gold Coast, Australia from April 5 to 9. A total of 76 athletes from 19 associations participated in the event. Australia won the gold medal, defeating South Africa in the final. Malta the bronze medal.

== Sectional play ==
The top two from each section advance to the knockout stage.

=== Section A ===
Rank	Nation	Athletes	MP	MW	MT	ML	FR	AG	PD	PTS
1	Australia	Carla Krizanic, Kelsey Cottrell, Natasha Scott, Rebecca Van Asch	4	4	0	0	94	32	62	12
2	Malaysia	Auni Fathiah, Azlina Arshad, Nur Fidrah Noh, Siti Zalina	4	3	0	1	69	42	27	9
3	Papua New Guinea	Ju Carlo, Loa Babona, Piwen Karkar, Rebecca Walo	4	1	1	2	34	81	-47	4
4	Cook Islands	Emily Jim, Jacquelin Purea, Teokotai Jim, Tiare Jim	4	1	0	3	48	59	-11	3
5	Namibia	Anjuleen Viljoen, Johanna van den Bergh, Lesley Vermeulen, Sheena Du Toit	4	0	1	3	41	72	-31	1

	Australia	Malaysia	Papua New Guinea	Cook Islands	Namibia
Australia	—	14–13	41–1	15–9	23–9
Malaysia	13–14	—	17–6	22–8	17–13
Papua New Guinea	1–41	6–17	—	15–11	12–12
Cook Islands	9–15	8–22	11–15	—	20–7
Namibia	9–23	13–17	12–12	7–20	—

=== Section B ===
Rank	Nation	Athletes	MP	MW	MT	ML	FR	AG	PD	PTS
1	India	Farzana Khan, Lovely Choubey, Nayanmoni Saikia, Rupa Rani Tirkey	4	3	0	1	78	48	30	9
2	Malta	Connie-Leigh Rixon, Rebecca Rixon, Rosemaree Rixon, Sharon Callus	4	3	0	1	67	53	14	9
3	Fiji	Doreen O'Connor, Loreta Kotoisuva, Radhika Prasad, Sheral Mar	4	2	0	2	57	71	-14	6
4	England	Ellen Falkner, Natalie Chestney, Sian Honnor, Sophie Tolchard	4	1	0	3	52	61	-9	3
5	Northern Ireland	Donna McNally, Erin Smith, Sandra Bailie, Sarah McAuley	4	1	0	3	49	70	-21	3

	India	Malta	Fiji	England	Northern Ireland
India	—	15–20	24–9	21–9	18–10
Malta	20–15	—	12–20	14–10	21–8
Fiji	9–24	20–12	—	11–19	17–16
England	9–21	10–14	19–11	—	14-15
Northern Ireland	10–18	8–21	16–17	15–14	—

=== Section C ===
Rank	Nation	Athletes	MP	MW	MT	ML	FR	AG	PD	PTS
1	South Africa	Elma Davis, Esme Kruger, Johanna Snyman, Nicolene Neal	4	3	1	0	62	38	24	10
2	New Zealand	Katelyn Inch, Mandy Boyd, Tayla Bruce, Val Smith	4	3	0	1	80	44	36	9
3	Zambia	Eddah Mpezeni, Foster Banda, Mildred Mkandawire, Sophia Matipa	4	2	0	2	57	56	1	6
4	Norfolk Island	Christine Jones, Christine Pauling, Shae Wilson, Tessie Evans	4	1	1	2	45	68	-23	4
5	Jersey	Christine Grimes, Doreen Moon, Eileen Vowden, Joan Renouf	4	0	0	4	44	82	-38	0

	South Africa	New Zealand	Zambia	Norfolk Island	Jersey
South Africa	—	16–11	17–10	10–10	19–7
New Zealand	11–16	—	21–8	28–5	20–15
Zambia	10–17	8–21	—	17–9	22–9
Norfolk Island	10–10	5–28	9–17	—	21–13
Jersey	7–19	15–20	9–22	13–21	—

=== Section D ===
Rank	Nation	Athletes	MP	MW	MT	ML	FR	AG	PD	PTS
1	Scotland	Claire Johnston, Kay Moran, Lesley Doig, Stacey McDougall	3	3	0	0	87	18	69	9
2	Canada	Jackie Foster, Joanna Cooper, Leanne Chinery, Pricilla Westlake	3	2	0	1	52	41	11	6
3	Wales	Anwen Butten, Caroline Taylor, Emma Woodcock, Jess Sims	3	1	0	2	51	54	-3	3
4	Niue	Cath Papani, Chris Hipa, Ku Ioane, Pilena Motufoou	3	0	0	3	17	94	-77	0

	Scotland	Canada	Wales	Niue
Scotland	—	21–7	22–10	44–1
Canada	7–21	—	25–11	20–9
Wales	10–22	11–25	—	30–7
Niue	1–41	9–20	7–30	—

== Knockout stage ==
Quarterfinal
A1	Australia	14
A2	Malaysia	12
D1	Scotland	11
D2	Canada	24
B1	India	11
B2	Malta	13
C1	South Africa	16
C2	New Zealand	8

Semifinal
A1	Australia	10
D2	Canada	9
B2	Malta	8
C1	South Africa	14

Finals
A1	Australia	18
C1	South Africa	16
Third place
D2	Canada	8
B2	Malta	17
