= Bowls at the 2026 Commonwealth Games – Mixed pairs B2–3 =

Bowls event

Bowls mixed pairs B2-3 at the 2026 Commonwealth Games
- Venue: SEC Centre
- Dates: 23 July – 28 July 2026
- Competitors: 24 from 6 nations

Medalists
gold medal	Mary Stevenson; Robert Barr	Scotland
silver medal	Ron Homer; Sally-Ann Lewis-Wall	England
bronze medal	Julie Thomas; Steffan James	Wales

Bowls at the 2026 Commonwealth Games – mixed pairs B2-3 was held at the SEC Centre in Glasgow from 23 to 28 July. Six nations entered the event. Mary Stevenson and Robert Barr of Scotland won the gold medal, defeating England's Ron Homer and Sally-Ann Lewis-Wall on a tiebreaker in the final. Julie Thomas and Steffan James from Wales won the bronze medal.

== Sectional play ==
The top four advance to the knockout stage.

=== Section A ===
Rank	Athlete	MP	MW	MT	ML	FR	AG	PD	PTS
1	Julie Thomas / Steffan James (WAL) (Q)	5	4	0	1	50	44	+6	12
2	Mary Stevenson / Robert Barr (SCO) (Q)	5	3	0	2	56	39	+17	9
3	Kerrin Wheeler / Sonya Woodrow (NZL) (Q)	5	3	0	2	56	29	+27	9
4	Ron Homer / Sally-Ann Lewis-Wall (ENG) (Q)	5	2	0	3	49	48	+1	6
5	Jake Fehlberg / Jacqueline Hudson (AUS)	5	2	0	3	41	50	-9	6
6	Nozipho Schroeder / Keith Orrell (RSA)	5	1	0	4	24	68	-44	3

	Wales	Australia	England	New Zealand	South Africa	Scotland
Wales	—	1*–1	2–0	1–1*	2–0	1*–1
Australia	1–1*	—	1*–1	0–2	1.5–0.5	0.5–1.5
England	0–2	1–1*	—	2–0	2–0	0–2
New Zealand	1*–1	2–0	0–2	—	1–1*	2–0
South Africa	0–2	0.5−1.5	0–2	1*–1	—	0–2
Scotland	1–1*	1.5–0.5	2–0	0–2	2–0	—

== Knockout stage ==
Semifinals
Wales	0
England	2
New Zealand	0.5
Scotland	1.5

Final
England	1
Scotland	1*
Bronze final
Wales	1*
New Zealand	1
