= Lawn bowls at the 2018 Commonwealth Games – Mixed para-sport pairs =

Lawn bowls – Mixed para-sport pairs at the 2018 Commonwealth Games
- Venue: Broadbeach Bowls Club
- Dates: 5 – 11 April 2018
- Competitors: 12 from 6 nations

Medalists
gold medal	Jake Fehlberg; Lynne Seymour	Australia
silver medal	Philippus Walker; Nozipho Schroeder	South Africa
bronze medal	Gilbert Miles; Julie Thomas	Wales

Lawn bowls mixed para-sport pairs at the 2018 Commonwealth Games was held at the Broadbeach Bowls Club in the Gold Coast, Australia from April 5 to 11. A total of 12 athletes from 6 associations participated in the event. Australia's Jake Fehlberg and Lynne Seymour won the gold medal, defeating Philippus Walker and Nozipho Schroeder of South Africa in the final. Gilbert Miles and Julie Thomas from Wales won the bronze medal.

== Sectional play ==
The top four advances to the knockout stage.

=== Section A ===
Rank	Nation	Athletes	MP	MW	MT	ML	FR	AG	PD	PTS
1	South Africa	Philippus Walker & Nozipho Schroeder	5	4	0	1	65	57	8	12
2	Australia	Jake Fehlberg & Lynne Seymour	5	3	0	2	87	52	35	9
3	Scotland	Robert Barr & Irene Edgar	5	3	0	2	64	53	11	9
4	Wales	Gilbert Miles & Julie Thomas	5	2	0	3	59	61	-2	6
5	New Zealand	David Stallard & Sue Curran	5	2	0	3	58	77	-19	6
6	England	Steven Simmons & Alison Yearling	5	2	0	3	55	88	-33	3

	South Africa	Australia	Scotland	Wales	New Zealand	England
South Africa	—	3–26	18–3	11–8	14–12	19–8
Australia	26–3	—	11–15	18–6	16–11	16–17
Scotland	3–18	15–11	—	7–13	23–5	16–6
Wales	8–11	6–18	13–7	—	11–14	21–11
New Zealand	12–14	11–16	5–23	14–11	—	16–13
England	8–19	17–16	6–16	11–21	13–16	—

== Knockout stage ==
Semifinal
1	South Africa	11
4	Wales	9
2	Australia	14
3	Scotland	8

Final
1	South Africa	9
2	Australia	12
Bronze medal
4	Wales	13
3	Scotland	12
