= Thabelo Muvhango =

South African lawn bowler

Personal information
- Nationality: South African
- Born: 7 May 2000 (age 26) South Africa

Sport
- Sport: Lawn bowls
- Club: Ferndale BC

Achievements and titles
- Highest world ranking: 22 (March 2025)
Medal record
Representing South Africa
Women's lawn bowls
Commonwealth Games
Silver medal – second place	2022 Birmingham	fours

Elinah Thabelo Muvhango (born 7 May 2000) is a South African international lawn bowler and national champion. She has represented South Africa at the Commonwealth Games and won a silver medal. She reached a career high ranking of world number 22 in March 2025.

== Biography ==
Muvhango won a national title when winning the pairs with Colleen Piketh, at the 2021 South African National Bowls Championships.

She was selected for the 2022 Commonwealth Games in Birmingham, where she competed in the women's triples and the women's fours event, reaching the final and winning a silver medal. Along with Esme Kruger, Johanna Snyman, and Bridget Calitz they lost in the final 17-10 to India.

In 2023, she was selected as part of the team to represent South Africa at the 2023 World Outdoor Bowls Championship. She participated in the women's triples and the women's fours events.

At the 2024, bowling for Ferndale, Muvhango teamed up with Heather Pembroke to win the pairs title at the South African nationals and was subsequently selected for the national team at the 2024 African States Tournament in Botswana.

Muvhango represented South Africa at the 2026 Commonwealth Games.
