= Anneke Scheepers =

South African international lawn bowler (born 1994)

Personal information
- Nationality: South African
- Born: 6 May 1994 (age 32) Cape Town, South Africa

Sport
- Sport: Lawn bowls
- Club: Goodwood BC

Achievements and titles
- Highest world ranking: 9 (July 2025)
Medal record
Representing South Africa
Commonwealth Games
Silver medal – second place	2018 Gold Coast	fours
Silver medal – second place	2022 Birmingham	fours
Atlantic Bowls Championships
Bronze medal – third place	2015 Paphos	triples
Bronze medal – third place	2015 Paphos	fours
Silver medal – second place	2019 Cardiff	fours
Bronze medal – third place	2019 Cardiff	triples

Johanna Anneke Scheepers {née Snyman, born 6 May 1994) is a South African international lawn bowler. She reached a career high ranking of world number 9 in July 2025.

== Biography ==
She was born in Cape Town, South Africa and won the triples and fours bronze medals at the Atlantic Bowls Championships.

She was selected as part of the South African team for the 2018 Commonwealth Games on the Gold Coast in Queensland where she claimed a silver medal in the Fours with Elma Davis, Esme Kruger and Nicolene Neal.

In 2019 she won the fours silver medal and triples bronze medal at the Atlantic Bowls Championships and in 2020 she moved clubs from Bredasdorp BC to Western Province Cricket Club.

In 2022, she competed in the women's triples and the Women's fours at the 2022 Commonwealth Games. In the fours the team of Snyman, Esme Kruger, Thabelo Muvhango and Bridget Calitz reached the final and won a silver medal after losing in the final 17-10 to India.

In 2023, she was selected as part of the team to represent South Africa at the 2023 World Outdoor Bowls Championship. She participated in the women's triples and the women's fours events.

Under her new name of Scheepers, she won the women's singles title at the South African National Bowls Championships and was selected for the national team at the 2024 African States Tournament in Botswana. In 2025, she won the national pairs with Megan Ferreira.
