= Stuart Crawford =

Scottish squash player (born 1981)

Personal information
- Nationality: British (Scottish)
- Born: 13 February 1981 (age 45) Irvine, Scotland
- Height: 1.83 m (6 ft 0 in)
- Weight: 76 kg (168 lb)

Sport
- Turned pro: 2005
- Retired: 2011
- Racquet used: Eye

Men's singles
- Highest ranking: No. 113 (February 2008)
- Title: 1
- Tour final: 2
Medal record
Representing Scotland
National Championships
Gold medal – first place	2005–07, 2009, 2011	singles

Stuart Crawford (born 13 February 1981) is a former professional squash player who has represented Scotland at the Commonwealth Games. He is five-time National champions and reached a career-high world ranking of World No. 113 in February 2008.

== Biography ==
Crawford was born in Irvine and represented the Scottish team at the 2014 Commonwealth Games in Glasgow, where he competed in the singles and doubles events reaching the quarter-finals of the men's doubles with Greg Lobban.

Crawford won the national singles champion five times at the Scottish National Squash Championships in 2005, 2006, 2007, 2009 and 2011.

In 2024, he was appointed the national coach of England Squash, having previously worked for Scottish Squash between 2010 and 2016.
