= Emma Cox =

Australian sport shooter

Personal information
- Nationality: Australian
- Born: 10 July 1992 (age 33)

Sport
- Sport: Shooting
Medal record
Shooting
Representing Australia
Commonwealth Games
Silver medal – second place	2018 Gold Coast	Women's double trap

Emma Cox (born 10 July 1992) is an Australian sport shooter. She competed in the women's double trap event at the 2018 Commonwealth Games, winning the silver medal.
