= Niue at the 2018 Commonwealth Games =

- Flag of Niue
- CG code: NIU
- CGA: Niue Island Sports Association National Olympic Committee
- Website: oceaniasport.com/niue

in Gold Coast, Australia 4 April 2018 – 15 April 2018
- Competitors: 19 in 4 sports
- Medals: Gold 0 Silver 0 Bronze 0 Total 0

Commonwealth Games appearances (overview)
- 2002; 2006; 2010; 2014; 2018; 2022; 2026; 2030

Niue competed at the 2018 Commonwealth Games in the Gold Coast, Australia from April 4 to April 15, 2018.

== Competitors ==
The following is the list of number of competitors participating at the Games per sport/discipline.

Sport	Men	Women	Total
Athletics	2	0	2
Boxing	1	0	1
Lawn bowls	5	5	10
Shooting	4	2	6
Total	12	7	19

== Athletics ==
Niue participated with 2 athletes (2 men).

Men
Field events

Athlete	Event	Qualification		Final	
Athlete	Event	Distance	Rank	Distance	Rank
Loe Kaufisi	Shot put	10.62	16	did not advance	
Nia Misikea	Shot put	12.13 NR	15	did not advance	
Loe Kaufisi	Javelin throw	38.44	24	did not advance	
Nia Misikea	Javelin throw	47.73	23	did not advance	

== Boxing ==
Niue participated with a team of 1 athlete (1 man).

Men

Athlete	Event	Round of 32	Round of 16	Quarterfinals	Semifinals	Final	Rank
Athlete	Event	Opposition Result	Opposition Result	Opposition Result	Opposition Result	Opposition Result	Rank
Don Vilitama	−75 kg	Dariel Ebanks (CAY); L W/O	did not advance				

== Lawn bowls ==
Niue is scheduled to compete in the lawn bowls competition.

Men

Athlete	Event	Group Stage						Quarterfinal	Semifinal	Final / BM	
Athlete	Event	Opposition Score	Opposition Score	Opposition Score	Opposition Score	Opposition Score	Rank	Opposition Score	Opposition Score	Opposition Score	Rank
Dalton Tagelagi	Singles	Omar (BRU); L 14–21	Burnett (SCO); L 3–21	Rusli (MAS); L 5–21	Priaulx (GUE); L 7–21	Bell (SAM); L 15–21	6	did not advance			
Mark Blumsky; Dalton Tagelagi	Pairs	Scotland; L 11–14	India; L 6–29	Norfolk Island; L 9–25	Malaysia; L 12–16	Samoa; W 18–17	5	did not advance			
Hala Funaki; Des Hipa; Keith Papani	Triples	Namibia; L 10–25	Singapore; L 12–24	New Zealand; L 8–36	Canada; L 7–23	—N/a	5	did not advance			
Mark Blumsky; Hala Funaki; Des Hipa; Keith Papani	Fours	Malaysia; L 3–31	Namibia; L 13–16	Northern Ireland; L 10–21	Fiji; L 9–20	—N/a	5	did not advance			

Women

Athlete	Event	Group Stage						Quarterfinal	Semifinal	Final / BM	
Athlete	Event	Opposition Score	Opposition Score	Opposition Score	Opposition Score	Opposition Score	Rank	Opposition Score	Opposition Score	Opposition Score	Rank
Pau Blumsky	Singles	Tikoisuva (FIJ); L 9–21	Edwards (NZL); L 11–21	Saroji (MAS); L 5–21	Rednall (ENG); L 9–21	Pinky (IND); L 9–21	6	did not advance			
Pau Blumsky; Cath Papani	Pairs	Malta; L 9–29	Australia; L 11–35	Papua New Guinea; L 8–21	England; L 8–29	Zambia; L 10–24	6	did not advance			
Chris Hipa; Ku Ioane; Pilena Motufoou	Triples	South Africa; L 7–40	England; L 5–42	Northern Ireland; L 7–28	—N/a		4	did not advance			
Chris Hipa; Ku Ioane; Pilena Motufoou; Cath Papani	Fours	Scotland; L 1–44	Wales; L 7–30	Canada; L 9–20	—N/a		4	did not advance			

== Shooting ==
Niue participated with 6 athletes (4 men and 2 women).

Men

Athlete	Event	Qualification		Final	
Athlete	Event	Points	Rank	Points	Rank
Tose Talagi	Trap	68	38	did not advance	
Toni Viliamu	Trap	79	37	did not advance	
Morgan Magatogia	Double trap	88	22	did not advance	
Toutu Talaiti	Double trap	74	26	did not advance	

Women

Athlete	Event	Qualification		Final	
Athlete	Event	Points	Rank	Points	Rank
Talotose Sioneholo	Trap	32	13	did not advance	
Talotose Sioneholo	Double trap	—N/a		63	9
Kirsty Togiavalu	Trap	26	14	did not advance	
Kirsty Togiavalu	Double trap	—N/a		30	10
