= Linda Pearson =

Clay target shooter

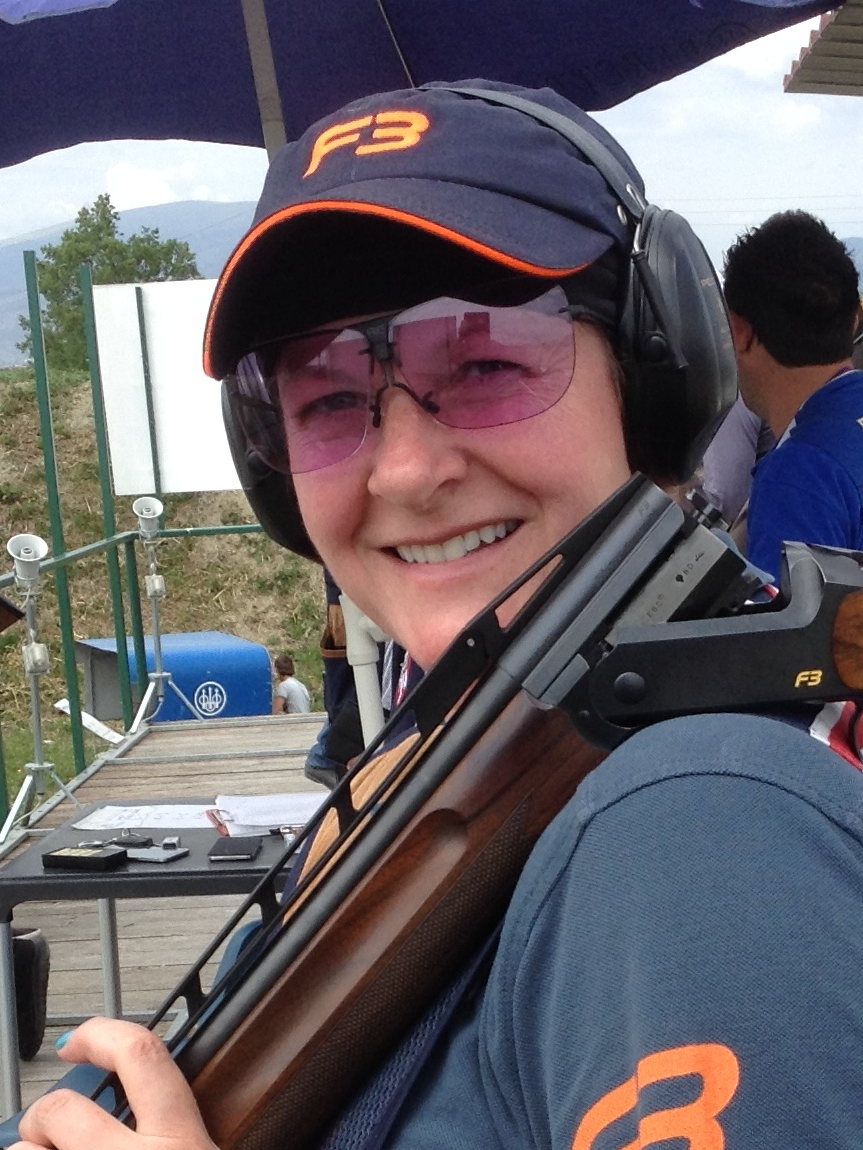

Personal information
- Nationality: Scottish
- Born: 6 March 1964 (age 62)

Sport
- Sport: Clay target shooting
Medal record
Shooting
Representing Scotland
Commonwealth Games
Bronze medal – third place	2018 Gold Coast	Women's double trap

Linda Pearson (born 6 March 1964) is a Scottish clay target shooter. She competed in the women's double trap event at the 2018 Commonwealth Games, winning the bronze medal. Linda has represented Great Britain in four different international clay target disciplines: Olympic Trap, Double Trap, Universal Trench and Compak Sporting.

Linda is the current British and Scottish record holder for the Double Trap discipline.
