= Esme Kruger =

South African international lawn bowler

Personal information
- Nationality: South African
- Born: 29 November 1971 (age 54) Pretoria, South Africa

Sport
- Sport: Lawn bowls
- Club: Hartenbos BC

Achievements and titles
- Highest world ranking: 8 (March 2025)
Medal record
Representing South Africa
Commonwealth Games
Silver medal – second place	2018 Gold Coast	fours
Silver medal – second place	2022 Birmingham	fours
Atlantic Bowls Championships
Silver medal – second place	2019 Cardiff	fours
Bronze medal – third place	2019 Cardiff	triples
National Championships
Silver medal – second place	2010	pairs
Silver medal – second place	2010	fours
Gold medal – first place	2012	fours
Gold medal – first place	2018	singles
Gold medal – first place	2021	fours
Silver medal – second place	2021	pairs

Esme Hester Johanna Kruger (born 29 November 1971) is a South African international lawn bowler. She reached a career high ranking of world number 8 in March 2025.

== Bowls career ==
Kruger was born in Pretoria, South Africa and was selected as part of the South African team for the 2018 Commonwealth Games on the Gold Coast in Queensland where she claimed a silver medal in the Fours with Elma Davis, Johanna Snyman and Nicolene Neal.

She won the 2018 singles title at the South African National Bowls Championships bowling for the Christian Brothers College Old Boys (CBCOB) Bowls Club. This was her second title after previously winning the fours in 2012.

In 2019, she won the fours silver medal and triples bronze medal at the Atlantic Bowls Championships and in 2020 she was selected for the 2020 World Outdoor Bowls Championship in Australia.

In 2021, she won the women's fours title and finished runner-up in the pairs at the South African National Bowls Championships bowling for the Christian Brothers College Old Boys (CBCOB) Bowls Club. This was her third national title.

In 2022, she competed in the women's triples and the Women's fours at the 2022 Commonwealth Games. In the fours the team of Johanna Snyman, Thabelo Muvhango and Bridget Calitz reached the final and won a silver medal after losing in the final 17-10 to India.

In 2023, she was selected as part of the team to represent South Africa at the 2023 World Outdoor Bowls Championship. She participated in the women's triples and the women's fours events.

Kruger switched clubs to Hartenbos BC was then selected for the national team at the 2024 African States Tournament in Botswana.
