= Lawn bowls at the 2018 Commonwealth Games – Men's singles =

Bowls event

Lawn bowls – Men's singles at the 2018 Commonwealth Games
- Venue: Broadbeach Bowls Club
- Dates: 9 – 13 April 2018
- Competitors: 24 from 24 nations

Medalists
gold medal	Aaron Wilson	Australia
silver medal	Ryan Bester	Canada
bronze medal	Robert Paxton	England

Lawn bowls men's singles at the 2018 Commonwealth Games was held at the Broadbeach Bowls Club in the Gold Coast, Australia from April 9 to 13. A total of 24 athletes from 24 associations participated in the event. Australia's Aaron Wilson won the gold medal, defeating Ryan Bester from Canada in the final. Robert Paxton from England won the bronze medal.

== Sectional play ==
The top two from each section advance to the knockout stage.

=== Section A ===
Rank	Athlete	MP	MW	MT	ML	FR	AG	PD	PTS
1	Shannon McIlroy (NZL)	5	4	0	1	102	46	56	12
2	Robert Paxton (ENG)	5	4	0	1	100	85	15	12
3	Arun Kumar (FIJ)	5	2	0	3	81	71	10	6
4	Krishna Xalxo (IND)	5	2	0	3	79	86	-7	6
5	Andrew Newell (JAM)	5	2	0	3	47	97	-50	6
6	Cephas Kimani (KEN)	5	1	0	4	62	86	-24	3

	New Zealand	England	Fiji	India	Jamaica	Kenya
New Zealand	—	18–21	21–15	21–0	21–0	21–10
England	21–18	—	21–13	21–19	16–21	21–14
Fiji	15–21	13–21	—	11–21	21–3	21–5
India	0–21	19–21	21–11	—	18–21	21–12
Jamaica	0–21	21–16	3–21	21–18	—	2–21
Kenya	10–21	14–21	5–21	12–21	21–2	—

=== Section B ===
Rank	Athlete	MP	MW	MT	ML	FR	AG	PD	PTS
1	Ryan Bester (CAN)	5	5	0	0	105	57	48	15
2	Gary Kelly (NIR)	5	4	0	1	96	65	31	12
3	Matu Bazo (PNG)	5	3	0	2	80	94	-14	9
4	Malcolm De Sousa (JER)	5	2	0	3	98	77	21	6
5	Kenneth McGreal (IOM)	5	1	0	4	62	97	-35	3
6	John Gaborutwe (BOT)	5	0	0	5	54	105	-51	0

	Canada	Northern Ireland	Papua New Guinea	Jersey	Isle of Man	Botswana
Canada	—	21–12	21–13	21–20	21–8	21–4
Northern Ireland	12–21	—	21–4	21–20	21–7	21–13
Papua New Guinea	13–21	4–21	—	21–16	21–18	21–18
Jersey	20–21	20–21	16–21	—	21–8	21–6
Isle of Man	8–21	7–21	18–21	8–21	—	21–13
Botswana	4–21	13–21	18–21	6–21	13–21	—

=== Section C ===
Rank	Athlete	MP	MW	MT	ML	FR	AG	PD	PTS
1	Darren Burnett (SCO)	5	5	0	0	105	45	60	15
2	Soufi Rusli (MAS)	5	4	0	1	103	62	41	12
3	Todd Priaulx (GUE)	5	3	0	2	87	72	15	9
4	Abdul Rahman bin Haji Omar (BRU)	5	2	0	3	83	89	-6	6
5	Edward Bell (SAM)	5	1	0	4	50	99	-49	3
6	Dalton Tagelagi (NIU)	5	0	0	5	44	105	-61	0

	Scotland	Malaysia	Guernsey	Brunei	Samoa	Niue
Scotland	—	21–19	21–13	21–8	21–2	21–3
Malaysia	19–21	—	21–11	21–13	21–12	21–5
Guernsey	13–21	11–21	—	21–20	21–3	21–7
Brunei	8–21	13–21	20–21	—	21–12	21–14
Samoa	2–21	12–21	3–21	12–21	—	21–15
Niue	3–21	5–21	7–21	14–21	15–21	—

=== Section D ===
Rank	Athlete	MP	MW	MT	ML	FR	AG	PD	PTS
1	Aaron Wilson (AUS)	5	5	0	0	105	63	42	15
2	Petrus Breitenbach (RSA)	5	4	0	1	90	85	5	12
3	Daniel Salmon (WAL)	5	3	0	2	94	90	0	9
4	Brendan Aquilina (MLT)	5	2	0	3	94	95	-1	6
5	Phil Jones (NFI)	5	1	0	4	80	89	-9	3
6	Taiki Paniani (COK)	5	0	0	5	64	105	-41	0

	Australia	South Africa	Wales	Malta	Norfolk Island	Cook Islands
Australia	—	21–6	21–16	21–17	21–18	21–6
South Africa	6–21	—	21–15	21–17	21–13	21–19
Wales	16–21	15–21	—	21–18	21–13	21–17
Malta	17–21	17–21	18–21	—	21–15	21–17
Norfolk Island	18–21	13–21	13–21	15–21	—	21–5
Cook Islands	6–21	19–21	17–21	17–21	5–21	—

== Knockout stage ==
Quarterfinals
A1	Shannon McIlroy (NZL)	16
A2	Robert Paxton (ENG)	21
D1	Aaron Wilson (AUS)	21
B2	Gary Kelly (NIR)	9
B1	Ryan Bester (CAN)	21
D2	Petrus Breitenbach (RSA)	9
C1	Darren Burnett (SCO)	21
C2	Soufi Rusli (MAS)	13

Semifinals
A1	Robert Paxton (ENG)	16
D1	Aaron Wilson (AUS)	21
B1	Ryan Bester (CAN)	21
C1	Darren Burnett (SCO)	19

Finals
D1	Aaron Wilson (AUS)	21
B1	Ryan Bester (CAN)	14
Third place
A1	Robert Paxton (ENG)	21
C1	Darren Burnett (SCO)	14
