= Shooting at the 2018 Commonwealth Games – Women's double trap =

Women's double trap at the 2018 Commonwealth Games
- Venue: Belmont Shooting Centre, Brisbane
- Dates: 11 April
- Competitors: 10

Medalists
gold medal	Shreyasi Singh	India
silver medal	Emma Cox	Australia
bronze medal	Linda Pearson	Scotland

The Women's double trap event at the 2018 Commonwealth Games are being held on 11 April at the Belmont Shooting Centre, Brisbane. There was only a single part for the competition without any separate final unlike other events.

== Results ==
=== Qualification ===
Rank	Name	1	2	ex 60	3	ex 90	4	Total	Notes
1st place, gold medalist(s)	Shreyasi Singh (IND)	24	25	49	22	71	25	96	S-off:+2
2nd place, silver medalist(s)	Emma Cox (AUS)	23	28	51	27	78	18	96	S-off:+1
3rd place, bronze medalist(s)	Linda Pearson (SCO)	24	25	49	18	67	20	87	
4	Varsha Varman (IND)	21	25	46	21	67	19	86	
5	Georgia Konstantinidou (CYP)	20	21	41	19	60	24	84	
6	Rachel Parish (ENG)	22	19	41	21	62	21	83	
7	Gaye Shale (AUS)	22	19	41	25	66	14	80	
8	Siti Mastura Binte Rahim (SGP)	16	19	35	19	54	14	68	
9	Talotose Sioneholo (NIU)	14	19	33	15	48	15	63	
10	Kirsty Togiavalu (NIU)	8	9	17	8	25	5	30	
