= Malta at the 2002 Commonwealth Games =

- CG code: MLT
- CGA: Malta Olympic Committee
- Website: www.nocmalta.org

in Manchester, England
- Flag bearers: Opening: Closing:
- Medals Ranked 33rd: Gold 0 Silver 0 Bronze 1 Total 1

Commonwealth Games appearances (overview)
- 1958; 1962; 1966; 1970; 1974–1978; 1982; 1986; 1990; 1994; 1998; 2002; 2006; 2010; 2014; 2018; 2022; 2026; 2030

Malta competed in their ninth Commonwealth Games in 2002 sending 13 male and 4 female athletes to compete in athletics, shooting, swimming, triathlon, weightlifting and wrestling. The nation gained their only medal in the men's Double Trap Shooting, a bronze. This was the second time Malta had won a medal at the games, their first coming in Auckland in 1990.

| | Gold | Silver | Bronze | Total |
|---|---|---|---|---|
| Malta | 0 | 0 | 1 | 1 |

== Bronze ==
Shooting:

(bronze) William Chetcuti Men's Double Trap Shooting
