= Lawn bowls at the 2022 Commonwealth Games – Qualification =

There was a nominal total of 36 parasport quota places available for lawn bowls at the 2022 Commonwealth Games; 18 each for men and women. All other quota places are decided by open allocation.

Cancellation of the International Bowls for the Disabled (IBD) 2021 World Championships meant that qualification was determined solely by invite.

== Rules ==
Each Commonwealth Games Association (CGA) is restricted to one entry per event, which equates to a maximum quota of three pairs (six bowlers). The host nation is guaranteed one pair quota per event; five pair quotas per event are awarded to other nations via Bipartite Invitations, most of them substitutions for quotas intended to be awarded at the 2021 World Championships.

The maximum cumulative point score per pair is 14 points for B6–8 events and 5 points for the B2–3 event. B5 and B1 bowlers may be selected for the former and latter respectively; in addition, B1–3 bowlers may be accompanied by a director (which does not affect quota allocation).

== Events ==
Men's pairs B6–8

Means of qualification	Date	Quotas	Qualified
Host Nation	—	1	England
Bipartite Invitation		5	Australia; New Zealand; Wales; Scotland; South Africa
TOTAL		6	

Women's pairs B6–8

Means of qualification	Date	Quotas	Qualified
Host Nation	—	1	England
Bipartite Invitation		4	Australia; New Zealand; Scotland; South Africa
TOTAL		5	

Mixed pairs B2–3

Means of qualification	Date	Quotas	Qualified
Host Nation	—	1	England
Bipartite Invitation		5	Australia; Scotland; Wales; New Zealand; South Africa
TOTAL		6	
