= Lawn bowls at the 2022 Commonwealth Games – Mixed pairs B2–3 =

Bowls event

Lawn bowls Mixed pairs B2–3 at the 2022 Commonwealth Games
- Venue: Victoria Park
- Dates: 31 July – 5 August 2022
- Competitors: 24 from 6 nations

Medalists
gold medal	Melanie Inness; George Miller; Robert Barr; Sarah Jane Ewing	Scotland
silver medal	Julie Thomas; Mark Adams; Gordon LLewellyn; John Wilson	Wales
bronze medal	Alison Yearling; Susan Wherry; Chris Turnbull; Mark Wherry	England

Lawn bowls Mixed pairs B2–3 at the 2022 Commonwealth Games was held at the Victoria Park from July 31 to August 5. A total of 12 athletes from 6 associations participated in the event. Scotland's Melanie Inness and George Miller won the gold medal, defeating Julie Thomas and Gordon LLewellyn of Wales in the final. Alison Yearling and Chris Turnbull from England won the bronze medal.

== Sectional play ==
The top four advance to the knockout stage.

Rank	Nation	Athletes	MP	MW	MT	ML	FR	AG	PD	PTS
1	Scotland	Melanie Inness, George Miller, Robert Barr, Sarah Jane Ewing	5	5	0	0	88	42	+46	15
2	Australia	Helen Boardman, Peter Doherty, Jake Fehlberg, Matthew Northcott	5	4	0	1	81	55	+26	12
3	Wales	Julie Thomas, Mark Adams, Gordon LLewellyn, John Wilson	5	2	0	3	63	67	–4	6
4	England	Alison Yearling, Susan Wherry, Chris Turnbull, Mark Wherry	5	2	0	3	60	67	–7	6
5	South Africa	Tracy Smith, Thomas Smith, Hermanus Scholtz, Annatjie van Rooyen	5	1	0	4	56	81	–25	3
6	New Zealand	Gerald Brouwers, Kevin Smith, Sue Curran, Bronwyn Milne	5	1	0	4	55	91	–36	0

	Australia	England	New Zealand	South Africa	Scotland	Wales
Australia	—	14–11	17–7	16–12	8–10	18–13
England	11–14	—	8–19	14–8	9–17	18–9
New Zealand	9–25	19–8	—	8–22	11–18	8–18
South Africa	12–16	8–14	22–8	—	6–28	8–15
Scotland	10–8	17–9	18–11	28–6	—	15–8
Wales	13–18	9–18	18–8	15–8	8–15	—

== Knockout stage ==
Semifinal
A1	Scotland	21
D4	England	6
A2	Australia	10
A3	Wales	13

Final
A1	Scotland	16
A3	Wales	9
Bronze medal
A4	England	14
A2	Australia	11
