= Bridget Herselman =

South African lawn bowler

Bridget Herselman (née Calitz)
Personal information
- Nationality: South African
- Born: 3 September 1997 (age 28) South Africa

Sport
- Sport: Lawn bowls
- Club: Leases BC
Medal record
Women's lawn bowls
Representing South Africa
Commonwealth Games
Silver medal – second place	2022 Birmingham	fours

Bridget Herselman (née Calitz; born 3 September 1997) is a South African international lawn bowler. She has represented South Africa at the Commonwealth Games and won a silver medal.

== Biography ==
Calitz started bowling in 2011 and in 2019, she finished as runner up in the singles at the South African National Bowls Championships.

Calitz was selected for the 2022 Commonwealth Games in Birmingham, where she competed in the women's triples and the women's fours events, reaching the final and winning a silver medal. Along with Esme Kruger, Johanna Snyman, and Thabelo Muvhango, she lost in the final 17-10 to India.

In August 2024, she married fellow bowler Jaydee Herselman.
