= Nicolene Neal =

South African lawn bowler (born 1970)

Personal information
- Nationality: South African
- Born: 2 March 1970 (age 56) Roodepoort, South Africa

Sport
- Sport: Lawn bowls
- Club: Leases BC
Medal record
Representing South Africa
Commonwealth Games
Silver medal – second place	2018 Gold Coast	Fours
Silver medal – second place	2018 Gold Coast	Pairs
Atlantic Bowls Championships
Gold medal – first place	2015 Paphos	pairs
Bronze medal – third place	2015 Paphos	fours
Gold medal – first place	2019 Cardiff	pairs
Silver medal – second place	2019 Cardiff	fours
National Championships
Gold medal – first place	2014	singles
Gold medal – first place	2016	singles
Gold medal – first place	2016	fours
Silver medal – second place	2021	singles

Nicolene Neal known as Nici Neal (born 2 March 1970) is a South African international lawn bowler.

== Career ==
Neal was born on 2 March 1970, in Roodepoort, and was selected as part of the South African team for the 2018 Commonwealth Games on the Gold Coast in Queensland where she claimed two silver medals: in the Fours with Elma Davis, Johanna Snyman and Esme Kruger and the Pairs with Colleen Piketh.

Neal won the 2014 and 2016 singles titles and the 2016 fours title at the South African National Bowls Championships bowling for the Leases Bowls Club. In 2015, she won the pairs gold medal at the Atlantic Bowls Championships.

In 2019, Neal won the pairs gold medal and fours silver medal at the Atlantic Bowls Championships and in 2020 she was selected for the 2020 World Outdoor Bowls Championship in Australia.
