= Lance Beddoes =

New Zealand squash player (born 1992)

Personal information
- Born: 3 November 1992 (age 33) Auckland, New Zealand
- Height: 1.80 m (5 ft 11 in)
- Weight: 74 kg (163 lb)

Sport
- Country: New Zealand
- Turned pro: 2009
- Retired: Active
- Racquet used: Tecnifibre

Men's singles
- Highest ranking: No. 87 (November 2015)
- Current ranking: No. 132 (April 2018)
- Updated on January 2016

Lance Beddoes (born 3 November 1992 in Auckland, New Zealand) is a New Zealand professional squash player. He attended Massey High School in West Auckland from 2006 to 2010. He reached a career-high world ranking of World No. 89 in November 2015. He has represented New Zealand in two Commonwealth Games, Glasgow in 2014 and Gold Coast 2018.
