= Nozipho Schroeder =

South African lawn bowler

Personal information
- Nationality: South African
- Born: December 1, 1951 (age 74) Cape Town, South Africa

Sport
- Country: South Africa
- Sport: Bowls
Medal record
Commonwealth Games
Silver medal – second place	2018 Gold Coast	mixed para-sport pairs

Nozipho Schroeder (born 1 December 1951) is a South African lawn bowler.

Schroeder participated at the 2018 Commonwealth Games where she won a silver medal in the mixed para-sport pairs event.
