= Sharon Callus =

Maltese international lawn bowler (born 1956)

Personal information
- Nationality: Maltese
- Born: 28 April 1956 (age 70) Carlton, Victoria, Australia

Sport
- Sport: Lawn bowls
Medal record
Representing Malta
Commonwealth Games
Bronze medal – third place	2018 Gold Coast	fours

Sharon Callus (born 28 April 1956) is a Maltese international lawn bowler.

She was born in Carlton, Victoria, Australia and was selected as part of the Maltese team for the 2018 Commonwealth Games on the Gold Coast in Queensland where she claimed a bronze medal in the Fours with Connie-Leigh Rixon, Rosemaree Rixon and Rebecca Rixon.

She is married to fellow Maltese international bowler Leonard Callus.
