= Malta at the 1962 British Empire and Commonwealth Games =

- CGF code: MLT
- CGA: Malta Olympic Committee
- Website: www.nocmalta.org

in Perth, Western Australia
- Competitors: 1 in 1 sport
- Flag bearers: Opening: Closing:
- Medals: Gold 0 Silver 0 Bronze 0 Total 0

British Empire and Commonwealth Games appearances
- 1958; 1962; 1966; 1970; 1974–1978; 1982; 1986; 1990; 1994; 1998; 2002; 2006; 2010; 2014; 2018; 2022; 2026; 2030

The Crown Colony of Malta competed at the 1962 British Empire and Commonwealth Games in Perth, Western Australia, from 22 November to 1 December 1962. In their second appearance at the Games, Malta had a single competitor compete in weightlifting competition. It did not win any medals.
