= Catherine Wimp =

Papua New Guinean lawn bowler

Personal information
- Nationality: Papua New Guinean
- Born: 19 April 1975 (age 51) Mount Hagen
Medal record
Representing Papua New Guinea
Asia Pacific Bowls Championships
Silver medal – second place	2019 Gold Coast	pairs

Catherine Wimp (born 1975) is an international Papua New Guinea lawn bowler.

== Bowls career ==
=== Commonwealth Games ===
Wimp represented Papua New Guinea in the singles and pairs at the 2014 Commonwealth Games and the triples and fours at the 2018 Commonwealth Games.

=== World Championships ===
In 2020 she was selected for the 2020 World Outdoor Bowls Championship in Australia.

=== Asia Pacific ===
Wimp won a silver medal in the pairs with Piwen Karkar at 2019 Asia Pacific Bowls Championships in the Gold Coast, Queensland.
