= Julie Thomas (bowls) =

Welsh lawn bowler (born 1967)

Personal information
- Born: 9 July 1967 (age 59)
- Home town: Bridgend, Wales

Sport
- Country: Wales
- Sport: bowls
Medal record
Commonwealth Games
Silver medal – second place	2022 Birmingham	Mixed pairs B2–3
Bronze medal – third place	2018 Gold Coast	Mixed para-sport pairs
Bronze medal – third place	2026 Glasgow	Mixed pairs B2–3

Julie Thomas (born 9 July 1967) is a Welsh lawn bowler.

== Career ==
Thomas was a head teacher at a primary school until she lost her sight She only took up the sport in 2014 and 2 months later won her first Welsh title. Thomas went on to win her first British Isles title in 2015 taking a gold medal in the B2 category. She was the first Welsh Para athlete to hold an Indoor and Outdoor title at the same time. Thomas has won 4 Gold medals since.

She competed at the Commonwealth Games in 2018, where she won a bronze medal in the mixed para-sport pairs event alongside Gilbert Miles, in 2022, where she won a silver medal in the Mixed pairs B2–3 event alongside Gordon Llewellyn, and in 2026 where she won a bronze medal in the Mixed pairs B2–3 event alongside Steffan James.
