= Piwen Karkar =

Papua New Guinean lawn bowler

Personal information
- Nationality: Papua New Guinean
- Born: 18 March 1995 (age 31) Lae, Papua New Guinea
Medal record
Representing Papua New Guinea
Asia Pacific Bowls Championships
Silver medal – second place	2019 Gold Coast	pairs

Piwen Karkar (born 18 March 1995) is an international Papua New Guinea lawn bowler.

== Bowls career ==
=== Commonwealth Games ===
Karkar represented Papua New Guinea in the triples and fours at the 2018 Commonwealth Games.

=== World Championships ===
In 2020, she was selected for the 2020 World Outdoor Bowls Championship in Australia but the event was cancelled due to the COVID-19 pandemic. In 2023, she was selected again as part of the team to represent papua New Guinea at the 2023 World Outdoor Bowls Championship. She participated in the women's singles and the women's pairs events.

=== Asia Pacific ===
Piwen won a silver medal in the pairs with Catherine Wimp at 2019 Asia Pacific Bowls Championships in the Gold Coast, Queensland.
