= Ashley Seeto =

Papua New Guinean swimmer

Personal information
- Born: 7 December 1987 (age 38)

Sport
- Sport: Swimming

Ashley Seeto (born 7 December 1987) is a Papua New Guinean swimmer. He competed in the men's 50 metre breaststroke event at the 2017 World Aquatics Championships. He also competed in six events for Papua New Guinea at the 2018 Commonwealth Games.
