= Leonard Kalate =

Papua New Guinean swimmer

Personal information
- Nationality: Papua New Guinean
- Born: 6 April 2000 (age 26)

Sport
- Sport: Swimming

Leonard Kalate (born 6 April 2000) is a Papua New Guinean swimmer. He competed in the men's 100 metre breaststroke event at the 2018 FINA World Swimming Championships (25 m), in Hangzhou, China.
