= Claire Johnston (bowls) =

Scottish bowls player

Personal information
- Nationality: British (Scottish)
- Born: 22 February 1979 (age 47) Irvine, Scotland
- Height: 170 cm (5 ft 7 in)
- Weight: 85 kg (187 lb)

Sport
- Sport: Bowls
- Club: Auchinleck BC
Medal record
Representing Scotland
World Outdoor Championships
Bronze medal – third place	2012 Adelaide	Pairs
Bronze medal – third place	2012 Adelaide	Team
Commonwealth Games
Bronze medal – third place	2018 Gold Coast	Pairs
World Indoor Bowls Championships
Gold medal – first place	2017 Yarmouth	Mixed pairs
Atlantic Bowls Championships
Gold medal – first place	2011 Paphos	pairs
Bronze medal – third place	2011 Paphos	singles
Gold medal – first place	2015 Paphos	fours
Bronze medal – third place	2015 Paphos	pairs
Silver medal – second place	2019 Cardiff	triples
Bronze medal – third place	2019 Cardiff	fours
British Isles Bowls Championships
Gold medal – first place	2022 Llandrindod Wells	pairs

Claire Johnston (born 22 February 1979) is a Scottish international lawn and indoor bowler.

== Bowls career ==
Johnston is from Irvine, North Ayrshire, in Scotland and won a bronze medal in the pairs at the 2012 World Outdoor Bowls Championship with Margaret Letham.

In 2011 she won the pairs gold medal and singles bronze medal at the Atlantic Bowls Championships and four years later she won the fours gold medal at the 2015 Atlantic Bowls Championships.

Johnston gained major indoor honours when winning the mixed pairs title at the 2017 World Indoor Bowls Championship with Nick Brett of England. In 2018 she was selected as part of the Scottish team for the 2018 Commonwealth Games on the Gold Coast in Queensland where she won a bronze medal in the Pairs with Lesley Doig.

In 2019 she won the Scottish National Bowls Championships pairs title with Hannah Smith. and also won the triples silver medal and fours bronze medal at the Atlantic Bowls Championships. In 2022, she won the pairs title at the British Isles Bowls Championships in Llandrindod Wells.

In 2022, she competed in the women's pairs and the Women's fours at the 2022 Commonwealth Games.
