= Gilbert Miles =

Cheyenne and Arapaho politician (1955–2023)

Lieutenant Governor of the Cheyenne and Arapaho Tribes
- In office January 6, 2018 – September 4, 2023
- Governor: Reggie Wassana
- Succeeded by: Hershel Gorham

Personal details
- Born: November 24, 1955 Oklahoma City, Oklahoma, US
- Died: September 4, 2023 (aged 67) Geary, Oklahoma, US

Gilbert 'Gib' LaMott Miles (November 24, 1955 – September 4, 2023) was a Cheyenne and Arapaho politician who served as the Cheyenne and Arapaho Tribes Lieutenant Governor from January 2018 until his death on September 4, 2023.

== Biography ==
Gilbert 'Gib' LaMott Miles was born on November 24, 1955, in Oklahoma City to LeRoy LaMott and Melba Sharp Miles. His family moved to Yukon when he was 13 and he graduated from Yukon High School in 1974 where he was the starting point guard, winning the State Basketball Championship. He went on to attend Bethany Nazarene University on a basketball scholarship where he graduated with a Bachelors in Political Science. He married Melinda Waters Miles in 1983 and they had three daughters, Mahgan, Mallory, Mariel and Mariah Miles. As the business owner of Stalking Energy LLC, Gilbert worked in the oil and gas industry before being elected as the Lieutenant Governor of the Cheyenne and Arapaho Tribes and assuming office in January 2018. He was re-elected in 2021 alongside Governor Reggie Wassana with 72 percent of the vote, becoming the first lieutenant governor in the tribe to serve two consecutive terms. He died on September 4, 2023, in Geary, Oklahoma, and was succeeded in office by Hershel Gorham.
