= Rosemaree Rixon =

Maltese international lawn bowler (born 1967)

Personal information
- Nationality: Maltese
- Born: 15 April 1967 (age 59) Darlinghurst, New South Wales, Australia

Sport
- Sport: Lawn bowls
Medal record
Representing Malta
Commonwealth Games
Bronze medal – third place	2018 Gold Coast	fours

Rosemaree Rixon (born 15 April 1967) is a Maltese international lawn bowler.

== Biography ==
She was born in Darlinghurst, New South Wales, Australia and was selected as part of the Maltese team for the 2018 Commonwealth Games on the Gold Coast in Queensland. where she claimed a bronze medal in the Fours with Connie-Leigh Rixon (her daughter), Rebecca Rixon (her daughter) and Sharon Callus.

In 2022, Rixon competed in the Women's fours event at the 2022 Commonwealth Games in Birmingham.

In 2023, she was selected as part of the team to represent Malta at the 2023 World Outdoor Bowls Championship. She participated in the women's triples and the women's fours events.
