= Daniel Zammit-Lewis =

Maltese squash player (born 1993)

Personal information
- Born: 30 April 1993 (age 33) Epsom, England

Sport
- Country: Malta
- Retired: Active
- Racquet used: Harrow

Men's singles
- Highest ranking: No. 358 (February 2012)
- Current ranking: No. 470 (April 2018)
- Updated on April 2018

Daniel Zammit-Lewis (born 30 April 1993 in Epsom) is a Maltese squash player. He has represented Malta at the Commonwealth Games in 2014 and 2018.
