= Colette Sultana =

English-Maltese squash player (born 1995)

Personal information
- Born: 25 June 1995 (age 31) Cambridge, England
- Education: Columbia University
- Height: 1.68 m (5 ft 6 in)
- Weight: 60 kg (132 lb)

Sport
- Country: Malta
- Handedness: Left-handed
- Turned pro: 2017
- Retired: Active

Women's singles
- Highest ranking: No. 91 (January 2017)
- Current ranking: No. 163 (May 2025)
- Title: 1

Colette Sultana (born 25 June 1995) is an English-born professional squash player who represents Malta internationally, including at the Commonwealth Games. She reached a career high ranking of 91 in the world during January 2017.

== Biography ==
Sultana attended Millfield School between 2011 and 2013. She graduated from Columbia University in May 2017, and represented the Lions varsity squash team during her time there, winning many accolades and awards.

In May 2025, Sultana won her maiden PSA title after securing victory in the Northern Territory Open, held in Darwin, during the 2024–25 PSA Squash Tour.
