= Rebecca Madyson =

Maltese sport shooter

Personal information
- Born: Rebecca Attard; 20 April 1979 (age 47)
- Spouse: Jamie Madyson

Sport
- Country: Malta; Australia
Medal record
Representing Malta
Commonwealth Games
Bronze medal – third place	2006 Melbourne	Women's trap

Rebecca Madyson (née Attard; 20 April 1979) is an Australian-born Maltese sport shooter.

Madyson's parents are Maltese emigrants to Australia. She competed for Australia at the Oceania Games and began representing Malta in 2005. She competed at the 2006 Commonwealth Games, where she won a silver medal in the women's trap event, the highest medal achieved by Malta at the Commonwealth Games. She also competed in 2010 in the women's trap pairs event. She was the flag bearer for Malta during the 2006 closing ceremony and the 2010 opening ceremony.
