= Rebecca Rixon =

Maltese lawn bowler (born 2000)

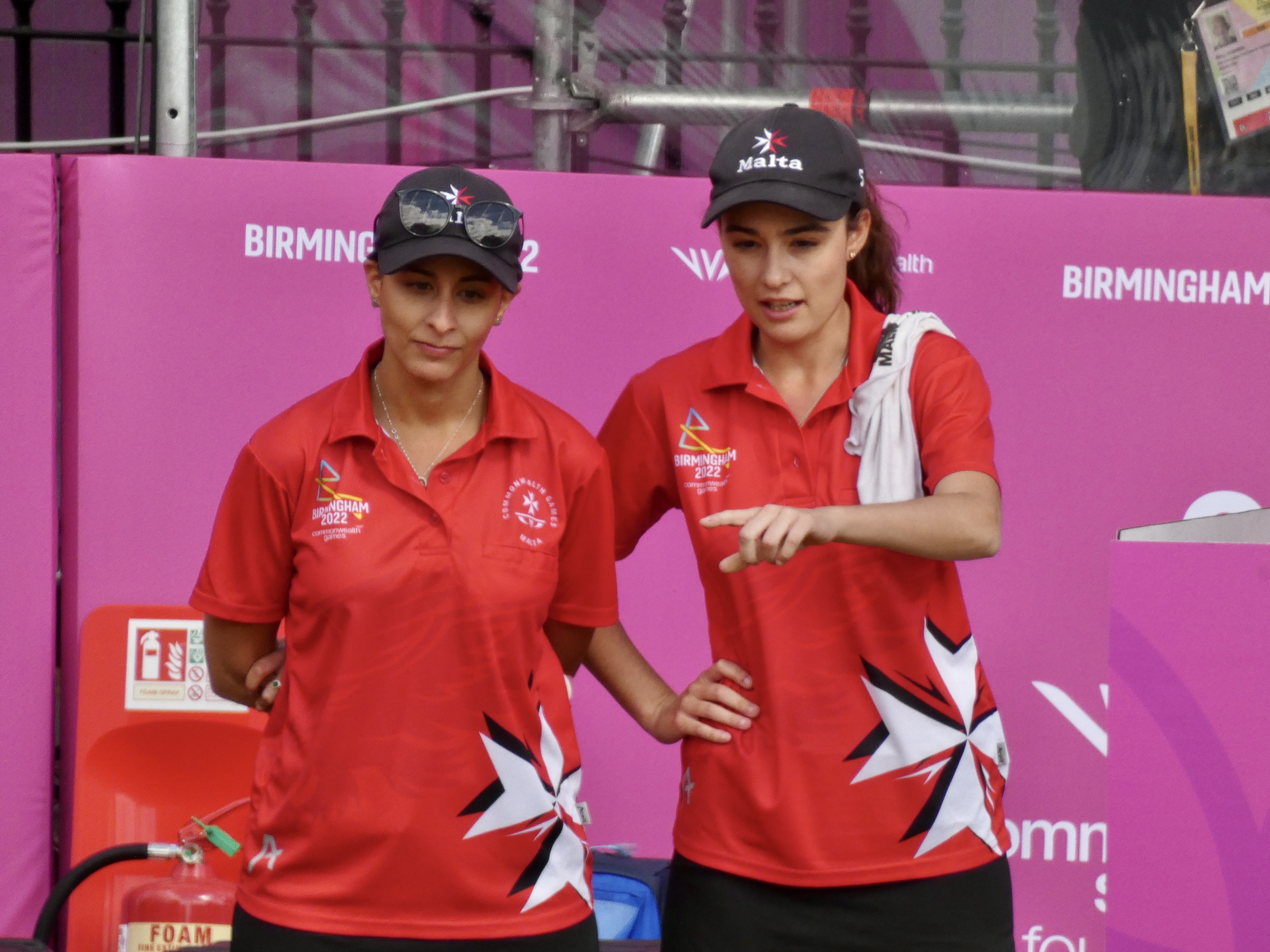
- Rebecca Rixon (right) with her sister at the 2022 Commonwealth Games

Personal information
- Nationality: Maltese / Australian
- Born: 9 December 2000 (age 25) Nambour, Queensland, Australia

Sport
- Sport: Lawn bowls
Medal record
Representing Malta
World Outdoor Championships
Silver medal – second place	2023 Gold Coast	pairs
Commonwealth Games
Bronze medal – third place	2018 Gold Coast	fours

Rebecca Louise Rixon (born 9 December 2000) is a Maltese international lawn bowler.

== Biography ==
She was born in Nambour, Queensland, Australia and was selected as part of the Maltese team for the 2018 Commonwealth Games on the Gold Coast in Queensland where she claimed a bronze medal in the Fours with Connie-Leigh Rixon (her sister), Rosemaree Rixon (her mother) and Sharon Callus.

In 2020, she was selected for the 2020 World Outdoor Bowls Championship in Australia but the event was cancelled due to the COVID-19 pandemic. In 2022, she competed in the women's pairs and the Women's fours at the 2022 Commonwealth Games in Birmingham.

In 2023, she was selected as part of the team to represent Malta at the 2023 World Outdoor Bowls Championship. She participated in the women's pairs and the women's fours events. In the pairs partnering her sister, she reached the final against Malaysia, where she won the silver medal after losing 15–11.

In December 2024, Rixon won the World Bowls Junior Indoor Championship.
