= Shaun Parnis =

Maltese lawn bowler

Personal information
- Nationality: Maltese
- Born: 16 January 1980 (age 46) Bankstown, New South Wales

Sport
- Sport: Lawn bowls

Shaun Parnis (born 16 January 1980) is an international lawn bowler. Born in Australia, he represents Malta internationally.

== Biography ==
He was born in Bankstown, New South Wales, Australia and works at Dapto Citizens Bowling Club. He represented Malta in the 2006 Commonwealth Games and 2010 Commonwealth Games.

He was selected as part of the Maltese team for the 2018 Commonwealth Games on the Gold Coast in Queensland where he reached the semi-finals of the Pairs with Brendan Aquilina.

In 2020, he was selected for the 2020 World Outdoor Bowls Championship in Australia. In 2022, Parnis was selected for the 2022 Commonwealth Games in Birmingham.
