= Broadbeach Bowls Club =

Sports complex in Gold Coast, Queensland

- Full name: Broadbeach Bowls Club
- Nicknames: Broadbeach Bulls
- Short name: Broadbeach Bowls
- Sport: Bowls
- Based in: Gold Coast, Queensland
- Location: Broadbeach, Queensland
- Website: http://www.broadbeachbowlsclub.com

The Broadbeach Bowls Club is a sports complex located in Gold Coast, Queensland. It is a venue for the 2018 Commonwealth Games. It was given an upgrade completed in May 2016 that included enhancements to the four international standard bowling greens and the clubhouse and surroundings to improve access and functionality.
