= Squash at the 2018 Commonwealth Games – Men's doubles =

Men's doubles Squash 2018 Commonwealth Games
- 6th Men's doubles squash at the Commonwealth Games
- Location: Gold Coast, Australia
- Venue: Oxenford Studios
- Date: 10 – 15 April 2018
- Website cwgsquash.net
- Category: XXI Commonwealth Games

The Men's doubles Squash event at the 2018 Commonwealth Games was held at the Oxenford Studios, Gold Coast from 10 to 15 April.

== Medalists ==
Gold	Australia; Zac Alexander; David Palmer
Silver	England; Daryl Selby; Adrian Waller
Bronze	England; Declan James; James Willstrop

== Seeds ==
1. Ryan Cuskelly / Cameron Pilley (AUS) (quarterfinals)
2. Alan Clyne / Greg Lobban (SCO) (Fourth medal)
3. Paul Coll / Campbell Grayson (NZL) (quarterfinals)
4. Declan James / James Willstrop (ENG) (bronze medal)
5. Zac Alexander / David Palmer (AUS) (gold medal)
6. Peter Creed / Joel Makin (WAL) (round of 16)
7. Daryl Selby / Adrian Waller (ENG) (silver medal)
8. Nafiizwan Adnan / Ivan Yuen (MAS) (round of 16)
9. Lance Beddoes / Evan Williams (NZL) (round of 16)
10. Mohd Syafiq Kamal / Ng Eain Yow (MAS) (quarterfinals)
11. Vikram Malhotra / Ramit Tandon (IND) (quarterfinals)
12. Christopher Binnie / Lewis Walters (JAM) (round of 16)
13. Tayyab Aslam / Farhan Zaman (PAK) (round of 16)
14. Bradley Hindle / Daniel Zammit-Lewis (MLT) (round of 16)
15. Jason-Ray Khalil / Sunil Seth (GUY) (round of 16)
16. Mandela Patrick / Kale Wilson (TTO) (round of 16)

== Finals ==
Round of 16
1	Ryan Cuskelly (AUS); Cameron Pilley (AUS)	11	11
15	Jason-Ray Khalil (GUY); Sunil Seth (GUY)	9	7
7	Daryl Selby (ENG); Adrian Waller (ENG)	11	11
9	Lance Beddoes (NZL); Evan Wiliams (NZL)	1	3
4	Declan James (ENG); James Willstrop (ENG)	11	11
14	Bradley Hindle (MLT); Daniel Zammit-Lewis (MLT)	5	3
11	Vikram Malhotra (IND); Ramit Tandon (IND)	11	11
12	Christopher Binnie (JAM); Lewis Walters (JAM)	4	10
6	Peter Creed (WAL); Joel Makin (WAL)	1	6
5	Zac Alexander (AUS); David Palmer (AUS)	11	11
13	Tayyab Aslam (PAK); Farhan Zaman (PAK)	6	6
3	Paul Coll (NZL); Campbell Grayson (NZL)	11	11
10	Mohd Syafiq Kamal (MAS); Ng Eain Yow (MAS)	4	11	11
8	Nafiizwan Adnan (MAS); Ivan Yuen (MAS)	11	9	10
16	Mandela Patrick (TTO); Kale Wilson (TTO)	2	5
2	Alan Clyne (SCO); Greg Lobban (SCO)	11	11

Quarterfinals
1	Ryan Cuskelly (AUS); Cameron Pilley (AUS)	11	8	10
7	Daryl Selby (ENG); Adrian Waller (ENG)	9	11	11
4	Declan James (ENG); James Willstrop (ENG)	10	11	11
11	Vikram Malhotra (IND); Ramit Tandon (IND)	11	8	5
5	Zac Alexander (AUS); David Palmer (AUS)	11	6	11
3	Paul Coll (NZL); Campbell Grayson (NZL)	9	11	7
10	Mohd Syafiq Kamal (MAS); Ng Eain Yow (MAS)	11	6	5
2	Alan Clyne (SCO); Greg Lobban (SCO)	9	11	11

Semifinals
7	Daryl Selby (ENG); Adrian Waller (ENG)	11	9	11
4	Declan James (ENG); James Willstrop (ENG)	9	11	10
5	Zac Alexander (AUS); David Palmer (AUS)	11	11
2	Alan Clyne (SCO); Greg Lobban (SCO)	8	5

Gold Medal Match
7	Daryl Selby (ENG); Adrian Waller (ENG)	9	11	6
5	Zac Alexander (AUS); David Palmer (AUS)	11	3	11
Bronze Medal Match
4	Declan James (ENG); James Willstrop (ENG)	11	11
2	Alan Clyne (SCO); Greg Lobban (SCO)	9	9

== Group stage ==
=== Pool A ===
Team	MP	MW	ML	GW	GL	GD	PW	PL	PD
Ryan Cuskelly (AUS); Cameron Pilley (AUS)	2	2	0	4	0	+4	44	5	+39
Mandela Patrick (TTO); Kale Wilson (TTO)	2	1	1	2	2	0	24	34	-10
Sailesh Pala (FIJ); Romit Parshottam (FIJ)	2	0	2	0	4	-4	15	44	-29

Date		Score		Set 1	Set 2	Set 3
10 Apr	Ryan Cuskelly (AUS); Cameron Pilley (AUS)	2–0	Sailesh Pala (FIJ); Romit Parshottam (FIJ)	11–3	11–0	
11 Apr	Ryan Cuskelly (AUS); Cameron Pilley (AUS)	2–0	Mandela Patrick (TTO); Kale Wilson (TTO)	11–0	11–2	
12 Apr	Mandela Patrick (TTO); Kale Wilson (TTO)	2–0	Sailesh Pala (FIJ); Romit Parshottam (FIJ)	11–9	11–3	

=== Pool B ===
Team	MP	MW	ML	GW	GL	GD	PW	PL	PD
Alan Clyne (SCO); Greg Lobban (SCO)	2	2	0	4	0	+4	44	14	+30
Jason-Ray Khalil (GUY); Sunil Seth (GUY)	2	1	1	2	3	-1	38	51	-13
Manda Chilambwe (ZAM); Kelvin Ndhlovu (ZAM)	2	0	2	1	4	-3	37	54	-17

Date		Score		Set 1	Set 2	Set 3
10 Apr	Alan Clyne (SCO); Greg Lobban (SCO)	2–0	Manda Chilambwe (ZAM); Kelvin Ndhlovu (ZAM)	11–4	11–4	
11 Apr	Alan Clyne (SCO); Greg Lobban (SCO)	2–0	Jason-Ray Khalil (GUY); Sunil Seth (GUY)	11–3	11–3	
12 Apr	Jason-Ray Khalil (GUY); Sunil Seth (GUY)	2–1	Manda Chilambwe (ZAM); Kelvin Ndhlovu (ZAM)	11–8	10–11	11–10

=== Pool C ===
Team	MP	MW	ML	GW	GL	GD	PW	PL	PD
Paul Coll (NZL); Campbell Grayson (NZL)	2	2	0	4	0	+2	44	20	+24
Bradley Hindle (MLT); Daniel Zammit-Lewis (MLT)	2	1	1	2	2	0	36	32	+4
Jason Doyle (SVG); Jules Snagg (SVG)	2	0	2	0	4	-4	16	44	-28

Date		Score		Set 1	Set 2	Set 3
10 Apr	Paul Coll (NZL); Campbell Grayson (NZL)	2–0	Jason Doyle (SVG); Jules Snagg (SVG)	11–4	11–2	
11 Apr	Paul Coll (NZL); Campbell Grayson (NZL)	2–0	Bradley Hindle (MLT); Daniel Zammit-Lewis (MLT)	11–4	11–10	
12 Apr	Bradley Hindle (MLT); Daniel Zammit-Lewis (MLT)	2–0	Jason Doyle (SVG); Jules Snagg (SVG)	11–6	11–4	

=== Pool D ===
Team	MP	MW	ML	GW	GL	GD	PW	PL	PD
Declan James (ENG); James Willstrop (ENG)	2	2	0	4	0	+2	44	18	+26
Tayyab Aslam (PAK); Farhan Zaman (PAK)	2	1	1	2	2	0	32	34	-2
Joe Chapman (IVB); Neville Sorrentino (IVB)	2	0	2	0	4	-4	20	44	-24

Date		Score		Set 1	Set 2	Set 3
10 Apr	Declan James (ENG); James Willstrop (ENG)	2–0	Joe Chapman (IVB); Neville Sorrentino (IVB)	11–4	11–4	
11 Apr	Declan James (ENG); James Willstrop (ENG)	2–0	Tayyab Aslam (PAK); Farhan Zaman (PAK)	11–7	11–3	
12 Apr	Tayyab Aslam (PAK); Farhan Zaman (PAK)	2–0	Joe Chapman (IVB); Neville Sorrentino (IVB)	11–8	11–4	

=== Pool E ===
Team	MP	MW	ML	GW	GL	GD	PW	PL	PD
Zac Alexander (AUS); David Palmer (AUS)	2	2	0	4	0	+4	44	21	+23
Christopher Binnie (JAM); Lewis Walters (JAM)	2	1	1	2	2	0	34	32	+2
Alexander Frazer (CAY); Jacob Kelly (CAY)	2	0	2	0	4	-4	19	44	-25

Date		Score		Set 1	Set 2	Set 3
10 Apr	Zac Alexander (AUS); David Palmer (AUS)	2–0	Alexander Frazer (CAY); Jacob Kelly (CAY)	11–6	11–3	
11 Apr	Zac Alexander (AUS); David Palmer (AUS)	2–0	Christopher Binnie (JAM); Lewis Walters (JAM)	11–7	11–5	
12 Apr	Christopher Binnie (JAM); Lewis Walters (JAM)	2–0	Alexander Frazer (CAY); Jacob Kelly (CAY)	11–3	11–7	

=== Pool F ===
Team	MP	MW	ML	GW	GL	GD	PW	PL	PD
Vikram Malhotra (IND); Ramit Tandon (IND)	2	2	0	4	1	+3	30	28	+2
Peter Creed (WAL); Joel Makin (WAL)	2	1	1	3	2	+1	28	30	-2
Ernest Jombla (SLE); Yusif Mansaray (SLE)	2	0	2	0	4	-4	0	0	0

Date		Score		Set 1	Set 2	Set 3
10 Apr	Peter Creed (WAL); Joel Makin (WAL)	2–0	Ernest Jombla (SLE); Yusif Mansaray (SLE)	Walkover		
11 Apr	Peter Creed (WAL); Joel Makin (WAL)	1–2	Vikram Malhotra (IND); Ramit Tandon (IND)	7–11	11–8	10–11
12 Apr	Vikram Malhotra (IND); Ramit Tandon (IND)	2–0	Ernest Jombla (SLE); Yusif Mansaray (SLE)	Walkover		

=== Pool G ===
Team	MP	MW	ML	GW	GL	GD	PW	PL	PD
Daryl Selby (ENG); Adrian Waller (ENG)	2	2	0	4	0	+4	44	16	+28
Mohd Syafiq Kamal (MAS); Ng Eain Yow (MAS)	2	1	1	2	2	0	34	26	+8
Michael Kawooya (UGA); Ian Rukunya (UGA)	2	0	2	0	4	-4	8	44	-36

Date		Score		Set 1	Set 2	Set 3
10 Apr	Daryl Selby (ENG); Adrian Waller (ENG)	2–0	Michael Kawooya (UGA); Ian Rukunya (UGA)	11–1	11–3	
11 Apr	Daryl Selby (ENG); Adrian Waller (ENG)	2–0	Mohd Syafiq Kamal (MAS); Ng Eain Yow (MAS)	11–4	11–8	
12 Apr	Mohd Syafiq Kamal (MAS); Ng Eain Yow (MAS)	2–0	Michael Kawooya (UGA); Ian Rukunya (UGA)	11–2	11–2	

=== Pool H ===
Team	MP	MW	ML	GW	GL	GD	PW	PL	PD
Nafiizwan Adnan (MAS); Ivan Yuen (MAS)	2	2	0	4	0	+4	44	38	+16
Lance Beddoes (NZL); Evan Wiliams (NZL)	2	1	1	2	2	0	41	33	+8
Othneil Bailey (SVG); Omari Wilson (SVG)	2	0	2	0	4	-4	20	44	-24

Date		Score		Set 1	Set 2	Set 3
10 Apr	Nafiizwan Adnan (MAS); Ivan Yuen (MAS)	2–0	Othneil Bailey (SVG); Omari Wilson (SVG)	11–6	11–3	
11 Apr	Nafiizwan Adnan (MAS); Ivan Yuen (MAS)	2–0	Lance Beddoes (NZL); Evan Wiliams (NZL)	11–9	11–10	
12 Apr	Lance Beddoes (NZL); Evan Wiliams (NZL)	2–0	Othneil Bailey (SVG); Omari Wilson (SVG)	11–4	11–7	
