= Cycling at the 2018 Commonwealth Games – Men's road time trial =

Cycling – Men's road time trial at the 2018 Commonwealth Games
- Venue: Currumbin Beachfront
- Dates: 10 April
- Competitors: 56 from 27 nations
- Winning time: 48:13.04

Medalists
gold medal	Cameron Meyer	Australia
silver medal	Harry Tanfield	England
bronze medal	Hamish Bond	New Zealand

The men's road time trial at the 2018 Commonwealth Games in Gold Coast, Australia was held on 10 April along the Currumbin Beachfront.

== Schedule ==
The schedule was as follows:

Date	Time	Round
Tuesday 10 April 2018	10:00	Race

All times are Australian Eastern Standard Time (UTC+10)

== Results ==
The results were as follows:

Rank	Name	Time	Behind
1st place, gold medalist(s)	Cameron Meyer (AUS)	48:13.04	–
2nd place, silver medalist(s)	Harry Tanfield (ENG)	48:43.30	+30.26
3rd place, bronze medalist(s)	Hamish Bond (NZL)	48:45.45	+32.41
4	Callum Scotson (AUS)	49:35.65	+1:22.61
5	James Oram (NZL)	49:40.72	+1:27.68
6	James McLaughlin (GGY)	49:54.12	+1:41.08
7	Marcus Christie (NIR)	50:42.29	+2:29.25
8	Charlie Tanfield (ENG)	50:42.83	+2:29.79
9	Ian Bibby (ENG)	50:43.88	+2:30.84
10	Brendon Davids (RSA)	51:44.00	+3:30.96
11	John Archibald (SCO)	52:01.35	+3:48.31
12	Sebastian Tremlett (GGY)	52:10.73	+3:57.69
13	Joseph Areruya (RWA)	52:24.16	+4:11.12
14	Jay Lamoureux (CAN)	52:46.99	+4:33.95
15	Peter Kibble (WAL)	52:55.24	+4:42.20
16	Mark Stewart (SCO)	52:55.32	+4:42.28
17	Jack English (GGY)	53:07.65	+4:54.61
18	Derek Gee (CAN)	53:11.86	+4:58.82
19	Dirk Coetzee (NAM)	53:16.85	+5:03.81
20	Andreas Miltiadis (CYP)	53:16.94	+5:03.90
21	Jake Kelly (IOM)	53:23.94	+5:10.90
22	Samuel Brand (IOM)	53:45.77	+5:32.73
23	Jack Rebours (JEY)	53:45.80	+5:32.76
24	Valens Ndayisenga (RWA)	54:06.50	+5:53.46
25	Xeno Young (NIR)	54:07.66	+5:54.62
26	Daniel Halksworth (JEY)	54:12.48	+5:59.44
27	Kyle Gordon (SCO)	54:33.77	+6:20.73
28	David Kinja (KEN)	54:35.62	+6:22.58
29	Christopher Rougier-Lagane (MRI)	55:05.59	+6:52.55
30	Alexandre Mayer (MRI)	55:08.45	+6:55.41
31	Derek Barbara (GIB)	55:16.02	+7:02.98
32	Charles Kagimu (UGA)	55:38.87	+7:25.83
33	Nathan Draper (IOM)	56:07.68	+7:54.64
34	Hasani Hennis (AIA)	56:11.05	+7:58.01
35	Anthony Boakye Danquah (GHA)	56:36.75	+8:23.71
36	Abdul Abdul Mumin (GHA)	56:40.44	+8:27.40
37	Martin Freyer (NAM)	58:12.22	+9:59.18
38	Gregory Rougier-Lagane (MRI)	58:13.65	+10:00.61
39	Avishka Mawathage (SRI)	58:48.27	+10:35.23
40	Giovanni Lovell (BIZ)	59:00.23	+10:47.19
41	Oscar Quiroz (BIZ)	59:02.25	+10:49.21
42	Jyme Bridges (ANT)	59:08.46	+10:55.42
43	Adam Jamieson (CAN)	59:40.95	+11:27.91
44	Christopher Gerry (SEY)	59:55.44	+11:42.40
45	Chamika Kumara (SRI)	1:00:48.02	+12:34.98
46	Jeffery Kelsick (ANT)	1:01:10.11	+12:57.07
47	Julian Bellido (GIB)	1:01:46.77	+13:33.73
48	Edgar Arana (BIZ)	1:01:56.09	+13:43.05
49	Bram Sanderson (DMA)	1:02:47.28	+14:34.24
50	Sherwin Osborne (AIA)	1:04:13.06	+16:00.02
51	Ali Kamara (SLE)	1:09:14.94	+21:01.90
52	Anthony Colebrook (BAH)	1:10:59.85	+22:46.81
53	Jeff Esparon (SEY)	1:11:15.25	+23:02.21
–	Mahmoud Keita (SLE)	DNF	–
–	Nicholas Dlamini (RSA)	DNS	–
–	Joseph Sheriff (GIB)	DNS	–
