= Sierra Leone at the 2018 Commonwealth Games =

- Flag of Sierra Leone
- CG code: SLE
- CGA: National Olympic Committee of Sierra Leone

in Gold Coast, Australia 4 April 2018 – 15 April 2018
- Competitors: 24 in 8 sports
- Medals: Gold 0 Silver 0 Bronze 0 Total 0

Commonwealth Games appearances (overview)
- 1958; 1962; 1966; 1970; 1974; 1978; 1982–1986; 1990; 1994; 1998; 2002; 2006; 2010; 2014; 2018; 2022; 2026; 2030

Sierra Leone competed at the 2018 Commonwealth Games in the Gold Coast, Australia from April 4 to April 15, 2018.

== Competitors ==
The following is the list of number of competitors participating at the Games per sport/discipline.

Sport	Men	Women	Total
Athletics	4	4	8
Beach volleyball	2	0	2
Boxing	2	0	2
Cycling	2	0	2
Squash	3	0	3
Swimming	1	1	2
Table tennis	2	0	2
Wrestling	2	1	3
Total	18	6	24

== Athletics ==
Men
Track & road events

Athlete	Event	Heat		Semifinal		Final	
Athlete	Event	Result	Rank	Result	Rank	Result	Rank
Ismail Kamara	100 m	10.70	5	did not advance			
Mohamed Othman	100 m	10.88	7	did not advance			
Vivian Williams	100 m	10.84	5	did not advance			
Mohamed Othman	200 m	22.22	7	did not advance			
Vivian Williams	200 m	21.89	6	did not advance			
Bockarie Sesay	400 m	49.98	6	did not advance			

Women
Track & road events

Athlete	Event	Heat		Semifinal		Final	
Athlete	Event	Result	Rank	Result	Rank	Result	Rank
Hafsatu Kamara	100 m	12.00	4	did not advance			
Mariatu Koroma	100 m	12.28	6	did not advance			
Dolly Mustapha	100 m	11.71	4 q	11.91	8	did not advance	
Hafsatu Kamara	200 m	24.50	5	did not advance			
Mariatu Koroma	200 m	25.59	7	did not advance			
Mariama Conteh	400 m	56.66	5	did not advance			
Dolly Mustapha	400 m	55.26	6	did not advance			
Mariama Conteh	800 m	2:16.57	9	—N/a		did not advance	

== Beach volleyball ==
Sierra Leone qualified a men's beach volleyball team, by winning the African qualification tournament held in October 2017.

Athlete	Event	Preliminary round	Standing	Quarterfinals	Semifinals	Final / BM	
Athlete	Event	Opposition Score	Standing	Opposition Score	Opposition Score	Opposition Score	Rank
Abubarr Kamara; Patrick Lombi	Men's	Pool B Pedlow – Schachter (CAN); L 0 - 2 (10 - 21, 14 - 21); Miedzybrodzki – Cook (SCO); L 1 - 2 (21 - 19, 18 - 21, 12 - 15); Pradeep – Yapa (SRI); W 2 - 0 (21 - 17, 22 - 20)	3 q	McHugh – Schumann (AUS); L 0 - 2 (12 - 21, 14 - 21)	did not advance		

== Boxing ==
Sierra Leone participated with a team of 2 athletes (2 men).

Men

Athlete	Event	Round of 32	Round of 16	Quarterfinals	Semifinals	Final	Rank
Athlete	Event	Opposition Result	Opposition Result	Opposition Result	Opposition Result	Opposition Result	Rank
Abu Bakarr Katta	−69 kg	Leroy Hindley (NZL); L 0-5	did not advance				
Gibrilla Kamara	−75 kg	BYE	Steven Donnelly (NIR); L 0-5	did not advance			

== Cycling ==
Sierra Leone participated with 2 athletes (2 men).

=== Road ===
Men

Athlete	Event	Time	Rank
Ali Kamara	Road race	DNF	
Ali Kamara	Time trial	1:09:14.94	51
Mahmoud Keita	Road race	DNF	
Mahmoud Keita	Time trial	DNF	

== Squash ==
Sierra Leone participated with 3 athletes (3 men).

Two of the squash players, Ernest Jombla and Yusif Mansaray, did not show up to their doubles match on April 12. They were among a string of competitors who vanished in Australia, possibly with what the organisors considered an intent to seek asylum in the country.

Individual

Athlete	Event	Round of 64	Round of 32	Round of 16	Quarterfinals	Semifinals	Final	
Athlete	Event	Opposition Score	Opposition Score	Opposition Score	Opposition Score	Opposition Score	Opposition Score	Rank
James Fayia	Men's singles	Micah Franklin (BER); L 0-3	did not advance					
Ernest Jombla	Men's singles	Klaus Pragassen (SEY); W 3-2	Cameron Pilley (AUS); L 0-3	did not advance				
Yusif Mansaray	Men's singles	Xavier Koenig (MRI); L 0-3	did not advance					

Doubles

Athlete	Event	Group stage			Round of 16	Quarterfinals	Semifinals	Final	
Athlete	Event	Opposition Score	Opposition Score	Rank	Opposition Score	Opposition Score	Opposition Score	Opposition Score	Rank
Ernest Jombla; Yusif Mansaray	Men's doubles	Creed / Makin (WAL); L W/O	Malhotra / Tandon (IND); L W/O	3	did not advance				

== Swimming ==
Sierra Leone participated with 2 athletes (1 man and 1 woman).

Athlete	Event	Heat		Semifinal		Final	
Athlete	Event	Time	Rank	Time	Rank	Time	Rank
Ishmael Koroma	Men's 50 m freestyle	DNS		did not advance			
Ishmael Koroma	Men's 50 m butterfly	28.73	53	did not advance			
Bunturabie Jalloh	Women's 50 m freestyle	38.27	40	did not advance			
Bunturabie Jalloh	Women's 50 m breaststroke	48.81	24	did not advance			

== Table tennis ==
Sierra Leone participated with 2 athletes (2 men).

Singles

Athletes	Event	Group Stage			Round of 64	Round of 32	Round of 16	Quarterfinal	Semifinal	Final	Rank
Athletes	Event	Opposition Score	Opposition Score	Rank	Opposition Score	Opposition Score	Opposition Score	Opposition Score	Opposition Score	Opposition Score	Rank
Rene Benjamin	Men's singles	Abiodun (NGR); L 0 - 4	Takooa (KIR); L 2 - 4	3	did not advance						
Emmanuel Gboyah	Men's singles	Abrefa (GHA); L 0 - 4	Johnny (KIR); L 1 - 4	3	did not advance						

Doubles

Athletes	Event	Round of 64	Round of 32	Round of 16	Quarterfinal	Semifinal	Final	Rank
Athletes	Event	Opposition Score	Opposition Score	Opposition Score	Opposition Score	Opposition Score	Opposition Score	Rank
Rene Benjamin; Emmanuel Gboyah	Men's doubles	Bye	Medjugorac / Wang (CAN); L 0 - 3	did not advance				

== Wrestling ==
Sierra Leone participated with 3 athletes (2 men and 1 woman).

Athlete	Event	Round of 16	Quarterfinal	Semifinal	Repechage	Final / BM	
Athlete	Event	Opposition Result	Opposition Result	Opposition Result	Opposition Result	Opposition Result	Rank
Abdulai Salam	Men's freestyle -74 kg	Botha (RSA); L 1 - 4	did not advance		Dodge (WAL); L 0 - 5	Did not advance	10
David Conteh	Men's freestyle -86 kg	Bye	Bibo (NGR); L 0 - 5	Did not advance	Bye	Eslami (ENG); L 0 - 4	5
Hajaratu Kamara	Women's freestyle -76 kg	—N/a	Wiebe (CAN); L 0 - 5	Did not advance	—N/a	Nelthorpe (ENG); L 0 - 5	5

== See also ==
- Sierra Leone at the 2018 Summer Youth Olympics
