= Seychelles at the 2018 Commonwealth Games =

- Flag of Seychelles
- CG code: SEY
- CGA: Seychelles Olympic and Commonwealth Games Association

in Gold Coast, Australia 4 April 2018 – 15 April 2018
- Competitors: 25 in 8 sports
- Flag bearer: Dylan Sicobo (opening)
- Medals Ranked 39th: Gold 0 Silver 0 Bronze 1 Total 1

Commonwealth Games appearances (overview)
- 1990; 1994; 1998; 2002; 2006; 2010; 2014; 2018; 2022; 2026; 2030

The Seychelles competed at the 2018 Commonwealth Games in the Gold Coast, Australia from 4 to 15 April 2018.

Track and field athlete Dylan Sicobo was the country's flag bearer during the opening ceremony.

== Medalists ==
Medal	Name	Sport	Event	Date
Bronze	Keddy Agnes	Boxing	Men's +91 kg	14 April

== Competitors ==
The following is the list of number of competitors participating at the Games per sport/discipline.

Sport	Men	Women	Total
Athletics	3	1	4
Badminton	2	2	4
Boxing	3	0	3
Cycling	3	0	3
Squash	1	0	1
Swimming	3	2	5
Table tennis	1	1	2
Weightlifting	2	1	3
Total	18	7	25

== Athletics ==
Men
Track & road events

Athlete	Event	Heat		Semi-final		Final	
Athlete	Event	Result	Rank	Result	Rank	Result	Rank
Sharry Dodin	100 m	DSQ		Did not advance			
Dylan Sicobo	100 m	10.74	4	Did not advance			
Sharry Dodin	200 m	21.38	4	Did not advance			
Leeroy Henriette	200 m	21.97	6	Did not advance			
Dylan Sicobo	200 m	DNS		Did not advance			

Women
Track & road events

Athlete	Event	Heat		Semi-final		Final	
Athlete	Event	Result	Rank	Result	Rank	Result	Rank
Joanne Loutoy	100 m	11.98	5	Did not advance			

== Badminton ==
The Seychelles participated with four athletes (two men and two women).

Singles

Athlete	Event	Round of 64	Round of 32	Round of 16	Quarterfinal	Semi-final	Final / BM	
Athlete	Event	Opposition Score	Opposition Score	Opposition Score	Opposition Score	Opposition Score	Opposition Score	Rank
Kervin Ghislain	Men's singles	Dinuka Karunaratne (SRI); L 0–2	Did not advance					
Steve Malcouzane	Men's singles	Christopher Jean Paul (MRI); L 0–2	Did not advance					
Juliette Ah-Wan	Women's singles	Grace Atipaka (GHA); L 0–2	Did not advance					
Allisen Camille	Women's singles	Mercy Joseph (KEN); W W/O	Rachel Honderich (CAN); L W/O	Did not advance				

Doubles

Athlete	Event	Round of 64	Round of 32	Round of 16	Quarterfinal	Semi-final	Final / BM	
Athlete	Event	Opposition Score	Opposition Score	Opposition Score	Opposition Score	Opposition Score	Opposition Score	Rank
Kervin Ghislain; Steve Malcouzane	Men's doubles	—N/a	Alexander Dunn (SCO); Adam Hall (SCO); L 0 – 2	Did not advance				
Juliette Ah-Wan; Allisen Camille	Women's doubles	—N/a	Julie MacPherson (SCO); Eleanor O'Donnell (SCO); L 0 – 2	Did not advance				
Juliette Ah-Wan; Steve Malcouzane	Mixed doubles	Anthony McNee (JAM); Alana Bailey (JAM); L 0 – 2	Did not advance					
Allisen Camille; Kervin Ghislain	Mixed doubles	Ty Alexander Lindeman (CAN); Brittney Tam (CAN); L 0 – 2	Did not advance					

Mixed team

Roster

- Juliette Ah-Wan
- Allisen Camille
- Kervin Ghislain
- Steve Malcouzane

Pool D

Pos	Team	Pld	W	L	MF	MA	MD	GF	GA	GD	PF	PA	PD	Pts	Qualification
1	Malaysia	2	2	0	9	1	+8	19	2	+17	433	202	+231	2	Knockout stage
2	Canada	2	1	1	6	4	+2	12	9	+3	358	328	+30	1	Knockout stage
3	Ghana	2	0	2	0	10	−10	0	20	−20	159	420	−261	0	
4	Seychelles DSQ	0	0	0	0	0	0	0	0	0	0	0	0	0	

Updated to match(es) played on 6 April 2018. Source:

Canada
5
Carrara Sports and Leisure Centre, Gold Coast
5 April

Seychelles
0

			1	2	3
1	(Canada) (Seychelles)	Jason Ho-Shue; Kervin Ghislain	21; 7	21; 6
2	(Canada) (Seychelles)	Michelle Li; Allisen Camille	21; 3	21; 5
3	(Canada) (Seychelles)	Brian Yang / Ty Alexander Lindeman; Kervin Ghislain / Steve Malcouzane	21; 18	21; 9
4	(Canada) (Seychelles)	Brittney Tam / Rachel Honderich; Allisen Camille / Juliette Ah-Wan				w/o
5	(Canada) (Seychelles)	Nyl Yakura / Kristen Tsai; Steve Malcouzane / Juliette Ah-Wan				w/o

Malaysia
5
Carrara Sports and Leisure Centre, Gold Coast
6 April

Seychelles
0

			1	2	3
1	(Malaysia) (Seychelles)	Goh Soon Huat; Kervin Ghislain	21; 10	21; 5
2	(Malaysia) (Seychelles)	Soniia Cheah; Juliette Ah-Wan				w/o
3	(Malaysia) (Seychelles)	Tan Wee Kiong / Goh V Shem; Kervin Ghislain / Steve Malcouzane	21; 14	21; 12
4	(Malaysia) (Seychelles)	Vivian Hoo / Chow Mei Kuan; Juliette Ah-Wan / Allisen Camille				w/o
5	(Malaysia) (Seychelles)	Goh Soon Huat / Shevon Jemie Lai; Steve Malcouzane / Allisen Camille	21; 8	21; 4

Seychelles
DSQ
Carrara Sports and Leisure Centre, Gold Coast
6 April

Ghana

			1	2	3
1	(Seychelles) (Ghana)	Kervin Ghislain / Allisen Camille; Daniel Sam / Stella Koteikai Amasah				not played
2	(Seychelles) (Ghana)	Steve Malcouzane; Abraham Ayittey				not played
3	(Seychelles) (Ghana)	Juliette Ah-Wan; Gifty Mensah				not played
4	(Seychelles) (Ghana)	Steve Malcouzane / Kervin Ghislain; Michael Opoku Baah / Emmanuel Donkor				not played
5	(Seychelles) (Ghana)	Juliette Ah-Wan / Allisen Camille; Grace Atipaka / Eyram Migbodzi				not played

== Boxing ==
The Seychelles participated with a team of 3 athletes (3 men).

Men

Athlete	Event	Round of 32	Round of 16	Quarterfinals	Semi-finals	Final	Rank
Athlete	Event	Opposition Result	Opposition Result	Opposition Result	Opposition Result	Opposition Result	Rank
Edrian Volcere	−64 kg	Richard Hadlow (NZL); L 4–1	Did not advance				
Shain Boniface	−69 kg	Jonathan Francois (GRN); L 5–0	Did not advance				
Keddy Agnes	+91 kg	—N/a	BYE	Arsène Fokou Fosso (CMR); W 4–1	Satish Kumar (IND); L ABD	Did not advance	3rd place, bronze medalist(s)

== Cycling ==
The Seychelles participated with 3 athletes (3 men).

=== Road ===
Men

Athlete	Event	Time	Rank
Stephen Belle	Road race	DNF	
Jeff Esparon	Road race	DNF	
Jeff Esparon	Time trial	1:11:15.25	53
Christopher Gerry	Road race	DNF	
Christopher Gerry	Time trial	59:55.44	44

=== Track ===
Sprint

Athlete	Event	Qualification		Final	
Athlete	Event	Time	Rank	Opposition Time	Rank
Stephen Belle; Jeff Esparon; Christopher Gerry	Men's team sprint	53.214	8	Did not advance	

Time trial

Athlete	Event	Time	Rank
Stephen Belle	Men's time trial	1:14.639	24
Christopher Gerry	Men's time trial	1:14.460	23

Scratch race

Athlete	Event	Qualification	Final
Stephen Belle	Men's scratch race	DNF	Did not advance
Christopher Gerry	Men's scratch race	DNF	Did not advance

== Squash ==
The Seychelles participated with 1 athlete (1 man).

Individual

Athlete	Event	Round of 64	Round of 32	Round of 16	Quarterfinals	Semi-finals	Final	
Athlete	Event	Opposition Score	Opposition Score	Opposition Score	Opposition Score	Opposition Score	Opposition Score	Rank
Klaus Pragassen	Men's singles	Jombla (SLE); L 2 – 3	Did not advance					

== Swimming ==
Men

Athlete	Event	Heat		Semi-final		Final	
Athlete	Event	Time	Rank	Time	Rank	Time	Rank
Dean Hoffman	50 m freestyle	24.88	=45	Did not advance			
Dean Hoffman	100 m freestyle	54.35	42	Did not advance			
Dean Hoffman	200 m freestyle	1:59.54	27	—N/a		Did not advance	
Adam Moncherry	50 m freestyle	24.88	=45	Did not advance			
Adam Moncherry	100 m freestyle	55.90	48	Did not advance			
Adam Moncherry	50 m butterfly	DSQ		Did not advance			
Samuele Rossi	50 m breaststroke	29.82	18	Did not advance			
Samuele Rossi	100 m breaststroke	1:06.25	17	Did not advance			
Samuele Rossi	200 m breaststroke	2:32.99	15	—N/a		Did not advance	
Samuele Rossi	200 m individual medley	2:21.10	24	—N/a		Did not advance	

Women

Athlete	Event	Heat		Semi-final		Final	
Athlete	Event	Time	Rank	Time	Rank	Time	Rank
Aaliyah Palestrini	50 m freestyle	28.52	29	Did not advance			
Aaliyah Palestrini	100 m freestyle	1:01.15	27	Did not advance			
Aaliyah Palestrini	50 m backstroke	31.19	25	Did not advance			
Aaliyah Palestrini	100 m backstroke	1:07.26	24	Did not advance			
Aaliyah Palestrini	200 m backstroke	2:28.48	14	—N/a		Did not advance	
Aaliyah Palestrini	50 m butterfly	30.59	25	Did not advance			
Aaliyah Palestrini	100 m butterfly	1:08.64	21	Did not advance			
Aaliyah Palestrini	200 m individual medley	2:36.25	16	—N/a		Did not advance	
Therese Soukup	50 m freestyle	28.45	28	Did not advance			
Therese Soukup	100 m freestyle	1:00.92	26	Did not advance			
Therese Soukup	200 m freestyle	2:15.63	20	—N/a		Did not advance	
Therese Soukup	400 m freestyle	4:45.35	20	—N/a		Did not advance	
Therese Soukup	50 m backstroke	32.88	28	Did not advance			
Therese Soukup	100 m backstroke	1:10.57	26	Did not advance			
Therese Soukup	200 m backstroke	2:36.95	16	—N/a		Did not advance	

== Table tennis ==
The Seychelles participated with 2 athletes (1 man and 1 woman).

Singles

Athletes	Event	Group stage			Round of 64	Round of 32	Round of 16	Quarterfinal	Semi-final	Final	Rank
Athletes	Event	Opposition Score	Opposition Score	Rank	Opposition Score	Opposition Score	Opposition Score	Opposition Score	Opposition Score	Opposition Score	Rank
Godfrey Sultan	Men's singles	Khwaja (PAK); W 4 – 1	Yogarajah (MRI); L 0 – 4	2	Did not advance						
Christy Bristol	Women's singles	Bye			—N/a	Baah-Danso (GHA); L 1 – 4	Did not advance				

Doubles

Athletes	Event	Round of 64	Round of 32	Round of 16	Quarterfinal	Semi-final	Final	Rank
Athletes	Event	Opposition Score	Opposition Score	Opposition Score	Opposition Score	Opposition Score	Opposition Score	Rank
Christy Bristol; Godfrey Sultan	Mixed doubles	Bye	Walker / Payet (ENG); L 0 – 3	Did not advance				

== Weightlifting ==
The Seychelles participated with 3 athletes (2 men and 1 woman).

Athlete	Event	Snatch		Clean & jerk		Total	Rank
Athlete	Event	Result	Rank	Result	Rank	Total	Rank
Rick Confiance	Men's −62 kg	101	12	Did not finish			
Dereck Come	Men's −105 kg	110	14	145	10	255	11
Clementina Agricole	Women's −63 kg	83	4	Did not finish			

== See also ==
- Seychelles at the 2018 Summer Youth Olympics
