= Zac Alexander =

Australian squash player

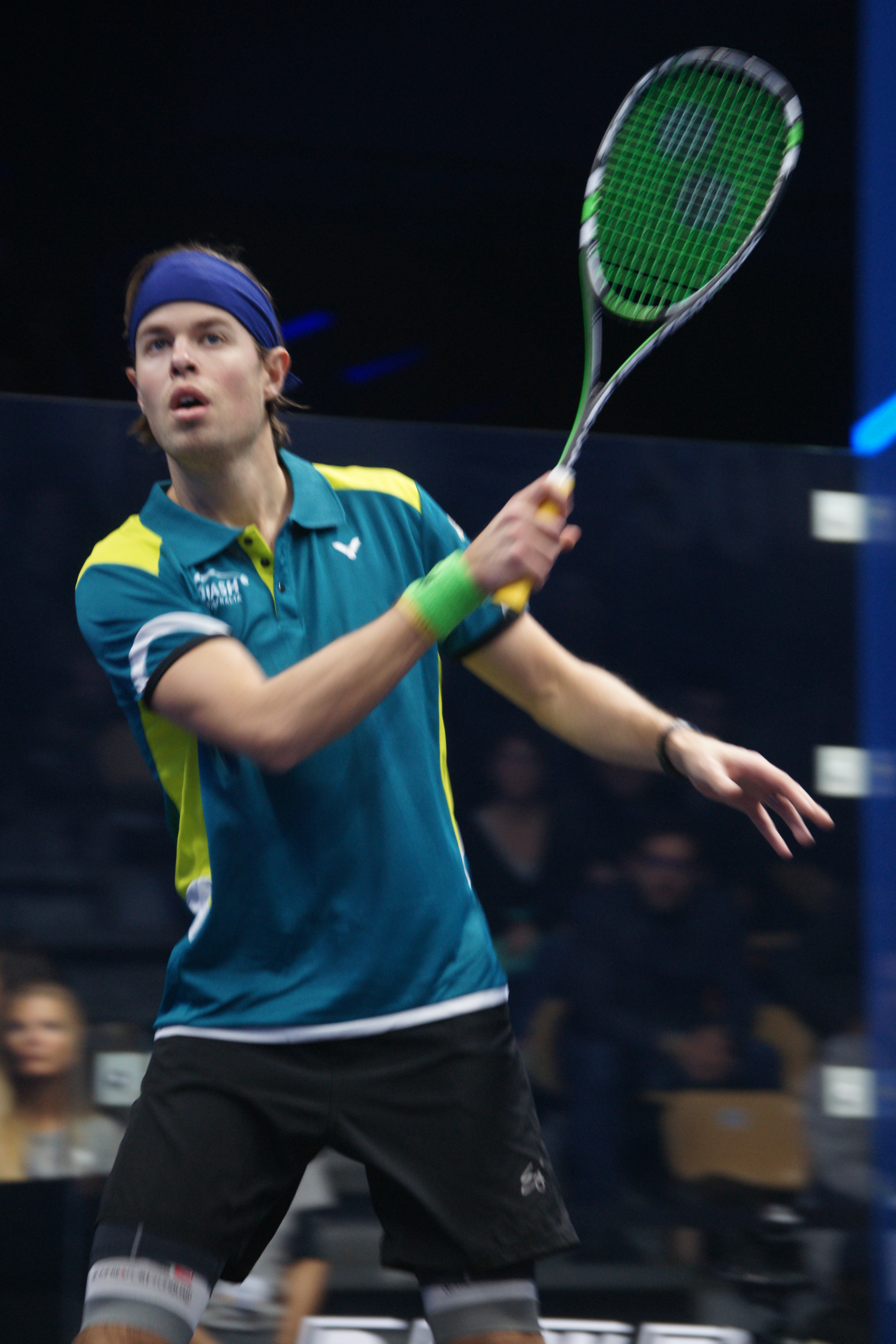
- Zac Alexander at the 2017 Men's World Team Squash Championships

Personal information
- Born: 11 February 1989 (age 37) Brisbane, Queensland, Australia
- Height: 6 ft 1 in (1.85 m)
- Weight: 72 kg (159 lb)

Sport
- Country: Australia
- Handedness: Right Handed
- Turned pro: 2007
- Coached by: Byron Davis, Rodney Martin
- Retired: Active
- Racquet used: Black Knight

Men's singles
- Highest ranking: No. 36 (September 2012)
- Current ranking: No. 94 (July 2016)
- Title: 11
- Tour final: 16
Medal record
Men's squash
Representing Australia
World Team Championships
| Bronze medal – third place | 2017 Marseille | Team |
World Doubles Championships
| Silver medal – second place | 2016 Darwin | Doubles |
| Silver medal – second place | 2019 Carrara | Doubles |
| Bronze medal – third place | 2019 Carrara | Mixed doubles |
Commonwealth Games
| Gold medal – first place | 2018 Gold Coast | Doubles |
- Updated on 13 April 2022

Zac Alexander (born 11 February 1989) is an Australian professional squash player. He reached a career-high PSA ranking of World No. 36 in September 2012 and has won a total of 26 PSA titles. In 2025, Zac began coaching PSA world number one ranked women's player Nouran Gohar

Zac won a men's doubles squash gold medal at the 2018 Commonwealth Games on the Gold Coast, teamed up with David Palmer defeating Daryl Selby and Adrian Waller of England (11–9, 3-11, 11-6). Zac also won a silver medal at the World Doubles in Darwin in 2016 and a gold medal at the Malaysian Open Doubles Championships later the same year. This has been a very successful period for Zac who made the Australian doubles team for the 2014 Commonwealth Games in Glasgow. However, he was forced to leave the games early when the Court of Arbitration for Sport ruled the higher-ranked singles player (Matthew Karwalski) should take his spot.

In the lead up to the 2018 Commonwealth Games on the Gold Coast, Zac dominated squash tournaments for the 2016-2017 season in Australia:

- Winner Tasmanian Open 2016 (defeated Ko Youngjo (KOR) 3-0: 11-8, 11-1, 11-4)
- Winner NSW Squash Open 2016 (defeated Aaron Frankcomb (AUS) 3-0: 11-6, 11-7, 11-9)
- Winner North Coast Open 2016 (defeated Joshua Larkin (AUS)13-11 11-4 11-2)
- Winner Q Squash Ltd Queensland open 2016 (defeated Joshua Larkin (AUS) 3-1: 11-9, 6-11, 11-8, 11-7)
- Winner Mackay Open 2016 (defeated Manuel Wanner (SUI) 11-6, 11-8, 11-3)
- Winner Pacific Toyota Cairns Squash International 2016 (defeated Steven Finitis (AUS) 11-6, 11-4, 9-11, 11-7)
- Winner Pure Blonde Elanora Open 2017 (defeated Josh Larkin (AUS) 11-2, 11-6, 11-6)
- Winner Australian Closed Championships 2017 (defeated Rhys Dowling (AUS) 11-7, 11-2, 11-1).
