= Swimming at the 2018 Commonwealth Games – Women's 50 metre freestyle =

Women's 50 metre freestyle at the 2018 Commonwealth Games
- Venue: Gold Coast Aquatic Centre
- Dates: 6 April (heats, semifinals); 7 April (final)
- Competitors: 40 from 30 nations
- Winning time: 23.78

Medalists
gold medal	Cate Campbell	Australia
silver medal	Bronte Campbell	Australia
silver medal	Taylor Ruck	Canada

The women's 50 metre freestyle event at the 2018 Commonwealth Games was held on 6 and 7 April at the Gold Coast Aquatic Centre.

== Records ==
Prior to this competition, the existing world, Commonwealth and Games records were as follows:

Record	Time	Athlete (nation)	Meet	Location	Date	Ref
World record	23.67	Sarah Sjöström (SWE)		Budapest, Hungary	29 July 2017	
Commonwealth record	23.79	Cate Campbell (AUS)		Gold Coast, Australia	3 March 2018	
Games record	23.96	Francesca Halsall (ENG)		Glasgow, United Kingdom	26 July 2014	

The following records were established during the competition:

Date	Event	Name	Nationality	Time	Record
6 April	Semifinal	Cate Campbell	Australia	23.88	GR
7 April	Final	Cate Campbell	Australia	23.78	CR

== Results ==
=== Heats ===
The heats were held on 6 April at 10:47.

Rank	Heat	Lane	Name	Nation	Time	Notes
1	6	4	Cate Campbell	Australia	24.24	Q
2	4	4	Shayna Jack	Australia	24.50	Q
3	5	4	Bronte Campbell	Australia	24.87	Q
4	6	5	Taylor Ruck	Canada	25.13	Q
5	5	3	Erin Gallagher	South Africa	25.21	Q
6	5	5	Anna Hopkin	England	25.29	Q
7	6	3	Kayla Sanchez	Canada	25.47	Q
8	5	6	Emma Chelius	South Africa	25.62	Q
9	6	6	Lucy Hope	Scotland	25.85	Q
10	4	2	Laticia Transom	New Zealand	25.96	Q
11	4	6	Kalia Antoniou	Cyprus	25.97	Q
12	6	2	Jessica Jackson	England	26.01	Q
13	5	2	Danielle Hill	Northern Ireland	26.02	Q
14	4	5	Quah Ting Wen	Singapore	26.22	Q
15	5	7	Lauren Hew	Cayman Islands	26.59	Q
16	6	8	Maria Brunlehner	Kenya	26.70	Q
17	6	7	Lushavel Stickland	Samoa	26.84	
18	5	1	Cheyenne Rova	Fiji	27.08	
19	6	1	Emily Siobhan Muteti	Kenya	27.14	
20	3	3	Matelita Buadromo	Fiji	27.19	
21	4	7	Alison Jackson	Cayman Islands	27.34	
22	5	8	Tilka Paljk	Zambia	27.47	
23	3	7	Tatiana Tostevin	Guernsey	27.52	
24	4	8	Elodie Poo Cheong	Mauritius	27.63	
25	3	6	Dilrukshi Perera	Sri Lanka	27.75	
26	1	5	Maayaa Ayawere	Ghana	28.38	
26	3	2	Oreoluwa Cherebin	Grenada	28.38	
28	2	5	Therese Soukup	Seychelles	28.45	
29	3	4	Aaliyah Palestrini	Seychelles	28.52	
30	3	8	Makaela Holowchak	Antigua and Barbuda	28.65	
31	2	2	Christina Linares	Gibraltar	28.68	NR
32	3	5	Bisma Khan	Pakistan	28.75	
33	2	4	Vinoli Kaluarachchi	Sri Lanka	28.76	
34	3	1	Jamila Sanmoogan	Guyana	28.86	
35	2	6	Avice Meya	Uganda	29.09	
36	1	3	Charissa Panuve	Tonga	30.34	
37	2	3	Miss Khatun	Bangladesh	31.10	
38	2	7	Aliah Maginley	Antigua and Barbuda	31.20	
39	4	1	Angelia Charles	Solomon Islands	36.18	
40	1	4	Bunturabie Jalloh	Sierra Leone	38.27	
	4	3	Penny Oleksiak	Canada	DNS	

=== Semifinals ===
The semifinals were held on 6 April at 20:12.

==== Semifinal 1 ====
Rank	Lane	Name	Nation	Result	Notes
1	4	Shayna Jack	Australia	24.63	Q
2	5	Taylor Ruck	Canada	24.72	Q
3	3	Anna Hopkin	England	25.33	Q
4	6	Emma Chelius	South Africa	25.89	
5	2	Laticia Transom	New Zealand	25.95	
6	7	Jessica Jackson	England	26.08	
7	1	Quah Ting Wen	Singapore	26.25	
8	8	Maria Brunlehner	Kenya	26.63	

==== Semifinal 2 ====
Rank	Lane	Name	Nation	Result	Notes
1	4	Cate Campbell	Australia	23.88	Q, GR
2	5	Bronte Campbell	Australia	24.38	Q
3	3	Erin Gallagher	South Africa	25.03	Q
4	6	Kayla Sanchez	Canada	25.20	Q
5	1	Danielle Hill	Northern Ireland	25.80	Q
6	2	Lucy Hope	Scotland	25.87	
7	7	Kalia Antoniou	Cyprus	25.89	
8	8	Lauren Hew	Cayman Islands	26.61	

=== Final ===
The final was held on 7 April at 19:43.

Rank	Lane	Name	Nation	Result	Notes
1st place, gold medalist(s)	4	Cate Campbell	Australia	23.78	CR, OC
2nd place, silver medalist(s)	5	Bronte Campbell	Australia	24.26	
2nd place, silver medalist(s)	6	Taylor Ruck	Canada	24.26	NR
4	3	Shayna Jack	Australia	24.57	
5	2	Erin Gallagher	South Africa	25.03	
6	7	Kayla Sanchez	Canada	25.12	
7	1	Anna Hopkin	England	25.28	
8	8	Danielle Hill	Northern Ireland	25.56	
