= British Virgin Islands at the 2018 Commonwealth Games =

- Flag of the British Virgin Islands
- CG code: IVB
- CGA: British Virgin Islands Olympic Committee
- Website: bviolympics.org

in Gold Coast, Australia 4 April 2018 – 15 April 2018
- Competitors: 10 in 2 sports
- Flag bearer: Kyron McMaster (opening)
- Medals Ranked 26th: Gold 1 Silver 0 Bronze 0 Total 1

Commonwealth Games appearances (overview)
- 1990; 1994; 1998; 2002; 2006; 2010; 2014; 2018; 2022; 2026; 2030

The British Virgin Islands competed at the 2018 Commonwealth Games in the Gold Coast, Australia from April 4 to April 15, 2018. The British Virgin Islands announced it will send a squad of 10 athletes. It was the British Virgin Islands's 8th appearance at the Commonwealth Games.

Track and field athlete Kyron McMaster was the country's flag bearer during the opening ceremony. The islands also won its first ever Commonwealth Games medal, through McMaster winning the gold in the men's 400 m hurdles event.

== Competitors ==
The following is the list of number of competitors participating at the Games per sport/discipline.

Sport	Men	Women	Total
Athletics	3	5	8
Squash	2	0	2
Total	5	5	10

== Medalists ==
Medal	Name	Sport	Event	Date
Gold	Kyron McMaster	Athletics	Men's 400 metres hurdles	12 April 2018

== Athletics ==
The British Virgin Islands announced a team of 8 athletes (3 men, 5 women) will compete at the 2018 Commonwealth Games.

Men
Track & road events

Athlete	Event	Heat		Semifinal		Final	
Athlete	Event	Result	Rank	Result	Rank	Result	Rank
Khari Herbert	400 m	DNF		did not advance			
Kyron McMaster	400 m hurdles	48.78	1 Q	—N/a		48.25	1st place, gold medalist(s)

Field events

Athlete	Event	Qualification		Final	
Athlete	Event	Distance	Rank	Distance	Rank
Eldred Henry	Shot put	18.19	11 q	18.19	11
Eldred Henry	Discus throw	50.43	10 q	50.96	11

Women
Track & road events

Athlete	Event	Heat		Semifinal		Final	
Athlete	Event	Result	Rank	Result	Rank	Result	Rank
Tahesia Harrigan-Scott	100 m	11.64	3 Q	11.63	7	did not advance	
Ashley Kelly	400 m	53.45	3 Q	53.00	5	did not advance	

Field events

Athlete	Event	Qualification		Final	
Athlete	Event	Distance	Rank	Distance	Rank
Chantel Malone	Long jump	6.29	10 q	6.48	5
Trevia Gumbs	Shot put	14.03	12 q	14.12	12
Trevia Gumbs	Discus throw	—N/a		NM	
Tynelle Gumbs	Discus throw	—N/a		47.04	9
Tynelle Gumbs	Hammer throw	—N/a		60.97	7

== Squash ==
The British Virgin Islands announced a team of 2 athletes (2 men) will compete at the 2018 Commonwealth Games.

Individual

Athlete	Event	Round of 64	Round of 32	Round of 16	Quarterfinals	Semifinals	Final	
Athlete	Event	Opposition Score	Opposition Score	Opposition Score	Opposition Score	Opposition Score	Opposition Score	Rank
Joseph Chapman	Men's singles	Zaman (PAK); L 1 - 3	did not advance					
Neville Sorrentino	Men's singles	Aslam (PAK); L 0 - 3	did not advance					

Doubles

Athlete	Event	Group stage			Round of 16	Quarterfinals	Semifinals	Final	
Athlete	Event	Opposition Score	Opposition Score	Rank	Opposition Score	Opposition Score	Opposition Score	Opposition Score	Rank
Joseph Chapman; Neville Sorrentino	Men's doubles	James / Willstrop (ENG); L 0 - 2	Aslam / Zaman (PAK); L 0 - 2	3	did not advance				

== See also ==
- British Virgin Islands at the 2018 Summer Youth Olympics
