= Squash at the 2018 Commonwealth Games =

- Venue: Oxenford Studios
- Location: Gold Coast, Australia
- Dates: 5 to 15 April 2018
- Competitors: 106 from 28 nations

Squash at the 2018 Commonwealth Games was the sixth appearance of the Squash at the Commonwealth Games. The squash events at the 2018 Commonwealth Games was held at the Oxenford Studios on the Gold Coast, Australia, from April 5 to 15. A total of five events were scheduled to be held, two each for men and women and a mixed doubles event. It was the sixth appearance of squash in the commonwealth games.

== Schedule ==
P	Preliminaries	1/8	Round of 16	1/4	Quarterfinals	1/2	Semifinals	B	Bronze medal match	F	Final

Event ↓/Date →	Thu 5	Fri 6	Sat 7	Sun 8	Mon 9		Tue 10	Wed 11	Thu 12		Fri 13	Sat 14		Sun 15	
Men's singles	P	1/8	1/4	1/2	B	F									
Men's doubles							P		1/8		1/4	1/2		B	F
Women's singles	P	1/8	1/4	1/2	B	F									
Women's doubles							P				1/4	1/2		B	F
Mixed doubles							P		1/8	1/4	1/2	B	F		

== Medal table ==
* Host nation (Australia)

Rank	Nation	Gold	Silver	Bronze	Total
1	New Zealand	2	1	1	4
2	Australia*	2	0	1	3
3	England	1	2	1	4
4	India	0	2	0	2
5	Malaysia	0	0	1	1
5	Wales	0	0	1	1
Totals (6 entries)		5	5	5	15

== Medallists ==
Event	Gold	Silver	Bronze
Men's singles	James Willstrop; England	Paul Coll; New Zealand	Mohd Nafiizwan Adnan; Malaysia
Women's singles	Joelle King; New Zealand	Sarah-Jane Perry; England	Tesni Evans; Wales
Men's doubles	Australia; Zac Alexander; David Palmer	England; Daryl Selby; Adrian Waller	England; Declan James; James Willstrop
Women's doubles	New Zealand; Joelle King; Amanda Landers-Murphy	India; Joshna Chinappa; Dipika Pallikal Karthik	Australia; Rachael Grinham; Donna Urquhart
Mixed doubles	Australia; Donna Urquhart; Cameron Pilley	India; Dipika Pallikal Karthik; Saurav Ghosal	New Zealand; Joelle King; Paul Coll

== Participating nations ==
There are 28 participating nations in squash with a total of 106 athletes.

- Australia (10 athletes)
- Barbados (3)
- Bermuda (1)
- British Virgin Islands (2)
- Canada (2)
- Cayman Islands (7)
- England (9)
- Fiji (4)
- Gibraltar (1)
- Guyana (4)
- India (2)
- Jamaica (6)
- Kenya (2)
- Malaysia (9)
- Malta (4)
- Mauritius (1)
- New Zealand (7)
- Pakistan (4)
- Papua New Guinea (2)
- Saint Vincent and the Grenadines (4)
- Scotland (5)
- Seychelles (1)
- Sierra Leone (3)
- Sri Lanka (2)
- Trinidad and Tobago (3)
- Uganda (2)
- Wales (4)
- Zambia (2)
