= Ernest Jombla =

Sierra Leonean squash player (born 1992)

Personal information
- Born: 4 October 1992 (age 33) Sierra Leone

Sport
- Country: Sierra Leone
- Retired: Active

Men's singles
- Updated on April 2018

Ernest Jombla (born 4 October 1992) is a Sierra Leonean squash player. He made his Commonwealth Games debut by representing Sierra Leone at the Commonwealth Games in Australia in 2018.

At the Games, Ernest Jombla was among a string of competitors who did not show up at their matches and vanished in Australia, possibly with what the organisers considered intent to seek asylum in the country.
