= Vikram Malhotra =

Indian squash player (born 1989)

Personal information
- Born: 16 November 1989 (age 36) Mumbai, India

Sport
- Country: India
- Handedness: Right Handed
- Racquet used: Ashaway
- Highest ranking: No. 43 (October 2020)
- Current ranking: No. 828 (September 2023)
- Updated on February, 2018

Vikram Malhotra (born 16 November 1989 in Mumbai) is an Indian professional squash player. As of September 2023, he was ranked number 828 in the world.
