= 2018 Commonwealth Games =

Multi-sport event on the Gold Coast, Queensland, Australia

XXI Commonwealth Games
- Logo of 2018 Commonwealth Games
- Host city: Gold Coast, Australia
- Motto: Share the Dream
- Nations: 71 Commonwealth teams
- Athletes: 4,426
- Events: 275 in 18 sports
- Opening: 4 April 2018
- Closing: 15 April 2018
- Opened by: Charles, Prince of Wales
- Closed by: Prince Edward, Earl of Wessex
- Athlete's Oath: Karen Murphy
- Queen's Baton Final Runner: Sally Pearson
- Main venue: Carrara Stadium
- Website: GC2018.com

The 2018 Commonwealth Games, officially known as the XXI Commonwealth Games and also known as Gold Coast 2018, were an international multi-sport event for members of the Commonwealth that was held on the Gold Coast, Queensland, Australia, between 4 and 15 April 2018. It was the fifth time Australia had hosted the Commonwealth Games and the first time a major multi-sport had an equal number of events for male and female athletes.

4,426 athletes including 300 para-athletes from 71 Commonwealth Games Associations took part in the event. The Gambia, which withdrew its membership from the Commonwealth of Nations and Commonwealth Games Federation (CGF) in 2013, was readmitted on 31 March 2018 and participated in the event. With 275 sets of medals, the games featured 18 Commonwealth sports, including beach volleyball, para triathlon and women's rugby sevens. These sporting events took place at 14 venues in the host city, two venues in Brisbane and one venue each in Cairns and Townsville.

This was the first Commonwealth Games to take place under the CGF presidency of Dame Louise Martin. The host city Gold Coast was announced at the CGF General Assembly in Basseterre, Saint Kitts, on 11 November 2011. Gold Coast became the seventh Oceanian city and the first regional city to host the Commonwealth Games. These were the eighth Games to be held in Oceania and the Southern Hemisphere.

The host nation Australia topped the medal table for the fourth time in the past five Commonwealth Games, winning the most golds (80) and most medals overall (198). England and India finished second and third respectively. Vanuatu, Cook Islands, Solomon Islands, British Virgin Islands and Dominica each won their first Commonwealth Games medals.

The 2018 Commonwealth Games boosted the Queensland economy by more than A$2.4 billion between 2013 and 2022, while the venues constructed and upgraded for the Games generated over $60 million in economic benefit annually to the Gold Coast, with the success of the 2018 Commonwealth Games credited with helping Brisbane to secure hosting rights for the 2032 Summer Olympics.

== Host selection ==
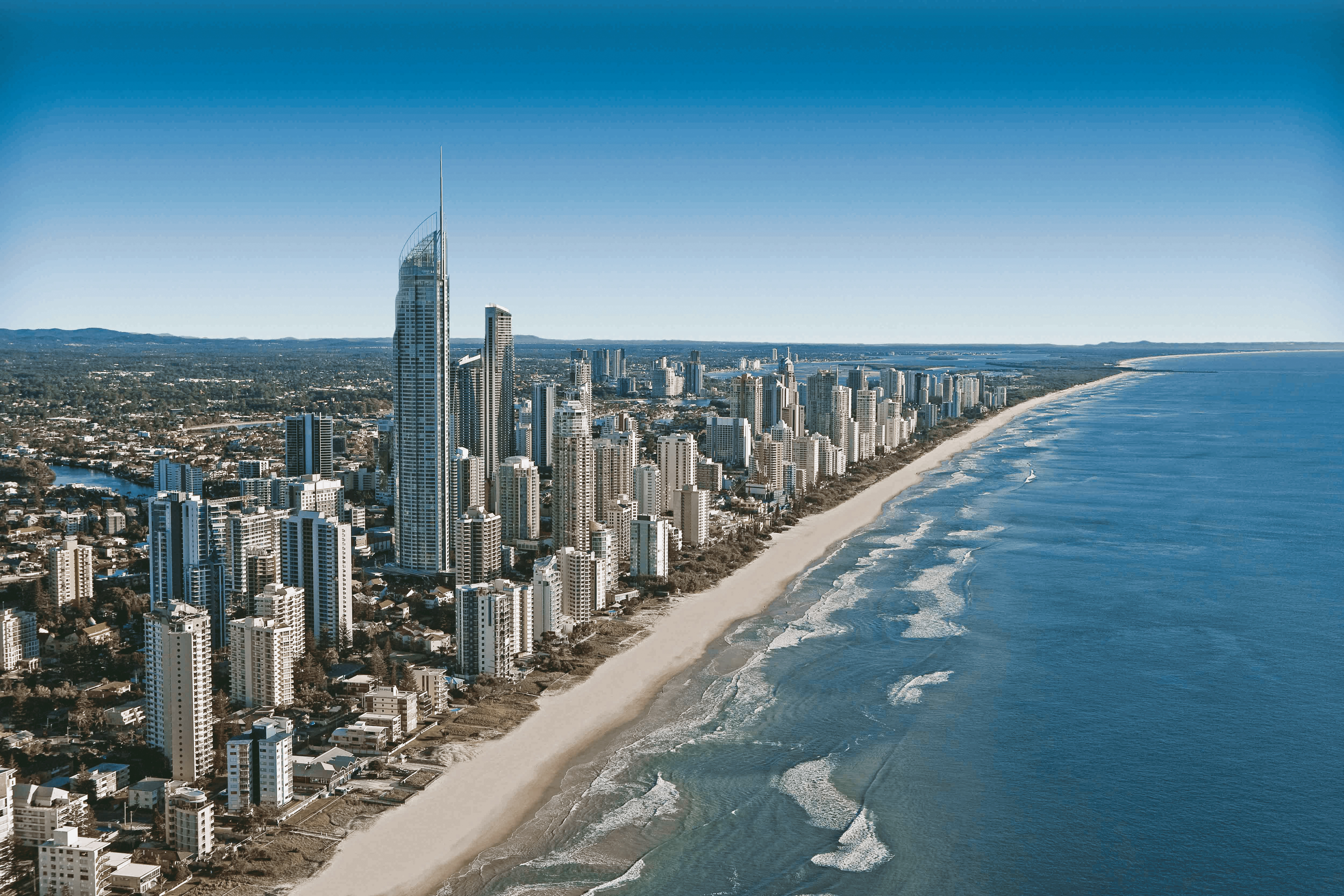
Gold Coast was selected by the Australian Commonwealth Games Association as the official bid city from Australia for the 2018 Commonwealth Games

On 22 August 2008, the Premier of Queensland, Anna Bligh, officially launched Gold Coast City's bid to host the Commonwealth Games in 2018. On 7 April 2009, the ABC reported a land exchange deal between Gold Coast City and State of Queensland for Carrara Stadium. According to Mayor Ron Clarke, the land would aid a potential bid for the 2018 Commonwealth Games.

The land exchanged would be used as the site of an aquatics centre. In the same article, Mayor Clarke raised the question of the Australian Federal Government's commitment to a Commonwealth Games bid in light of the Government's support for Australia's 2018 FIFA World Cup Finals bid. On 16 April 2009, Queensland Premier Anna Bligh told reporters that a successful Commonwealth Games bid by Gold Coast City could help the tourist strip win a role in hosting the World Cup.

Clarke said "some of the infrastructure that would be built for the Commonwealth Games will be useful for Gold Coast City to get a World Cup game out of the soccer World Cup if we're successful as a nation." However, the decision on the venues for the 2018 and 2022 FIFA World Cups were made eleven months prior to the bid decision for the 2018 Commonwealth Games, so the potential World Cup venues had already been chosen. On 3 June 2009, Gold Coast City was confirmed as Australia's exclusive bidder vying for the 2018 Commonwealth Games. "Should a bid proceed, Gold Coast City will have the exclusive Australian rights to bid as host city for 2018," Bligh stated. "Recently I met with the president and CEO of the Australian Commonwealth Games Association and we agreed to commission a full and comprehensive feasibility study into the potential for the 2018 Commonwealth Games," she said. "Under the stewardship of Queensland Events new chair, Geoff Dixon, that study is now well advanced." On 15 March 2010, it was announced that the Queensland Government will provide initial funding of A$11 million for the 2018 Commonwealth Games bid.

The Premier of Queensland has indicated the Government's support for the bid to the Australian Commonwealth Games Association. On 31 March 2010, the Australian Commonwealth Games Association officially launched the bid to host the 2018 Commonwealth Games. In October 2011, Gold Coast City Mayor Ron Clarke stated that the games would provide a strong legacy for the city after the games have ended.

On 31 March 2010, a surprise bid was made for the 2018 Commonwealth Games by Hambantota in Sri Lanka. Hambantota was devastated by the 2004 Indian Ocean Tsunami, and was undergoing a major face lift. The first phase of the Hambantota International Port was nearing completion at the time, and a new cricket stadium had also been built, which had hosted matches in the 2011 Cricket World Cup.

On 10 November 2011, the Hambantota bidders claimed they had already secured enough votes to win the hosting rights. However, on 11 November it was officially announced Gold Coast City had won the rights to host the games.

2018 Commonwealth Games bidding results
City	Country	Votes
Gold Coast City	Australia	43
Hambantota	Sri Lanka	27

== Development and preparation ==
The event was overseen by the Gold Coast 2018 Commonwealth Games Corporation (GOLDOC). The GOLDOC was formed in 2012 by the Government of Queensland. Its headquarters were located in Ashmore, a suburban region of Gold Coast. In February 2012, Mark Peters was appointed chief executive officer of the GOLDOC. The Queensland Government Minister Kate Jones was tasked with overseeing the Games. Peter Beattie AC served as the chairman of GOLDOC who was appointed on 17 May 2016 to replace Nigel Chamier OAM.

=== Venues ===
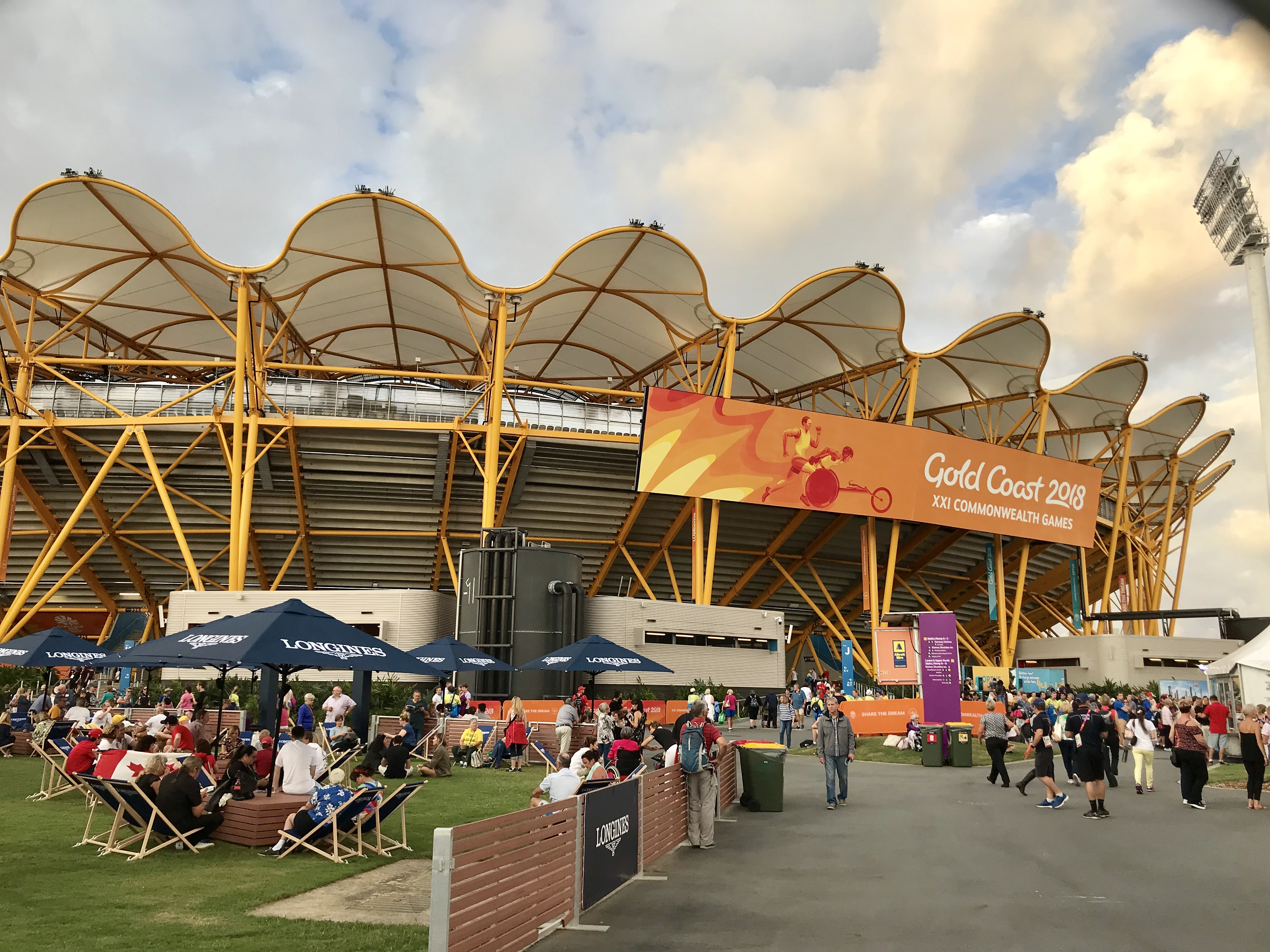
Carrara Stadium hosted the ceremonies and the athletics

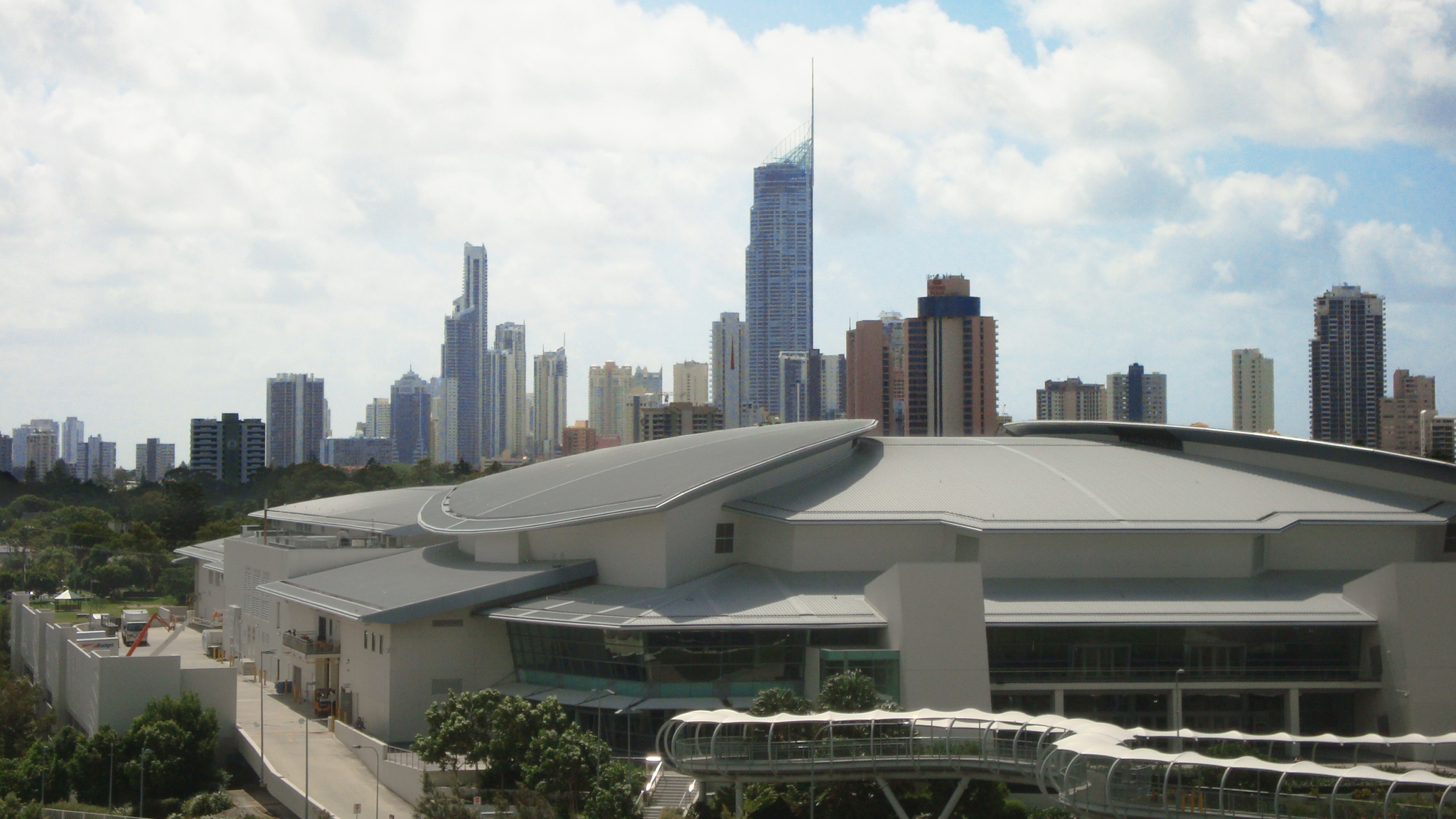
Gold Coast Convention and Exhibition Centre hosted netball

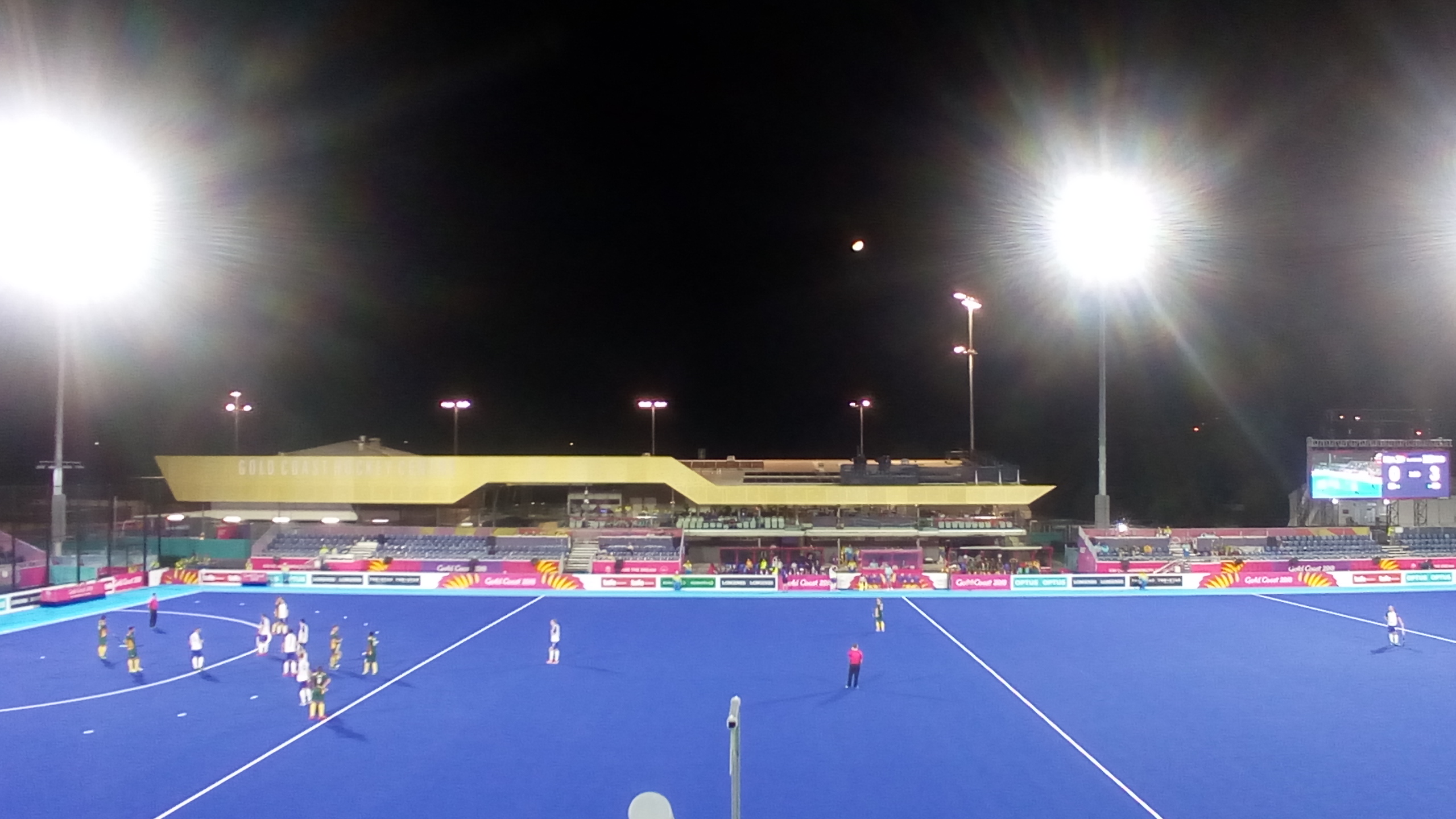
Gold Coast Hockey Centre hosted hockey

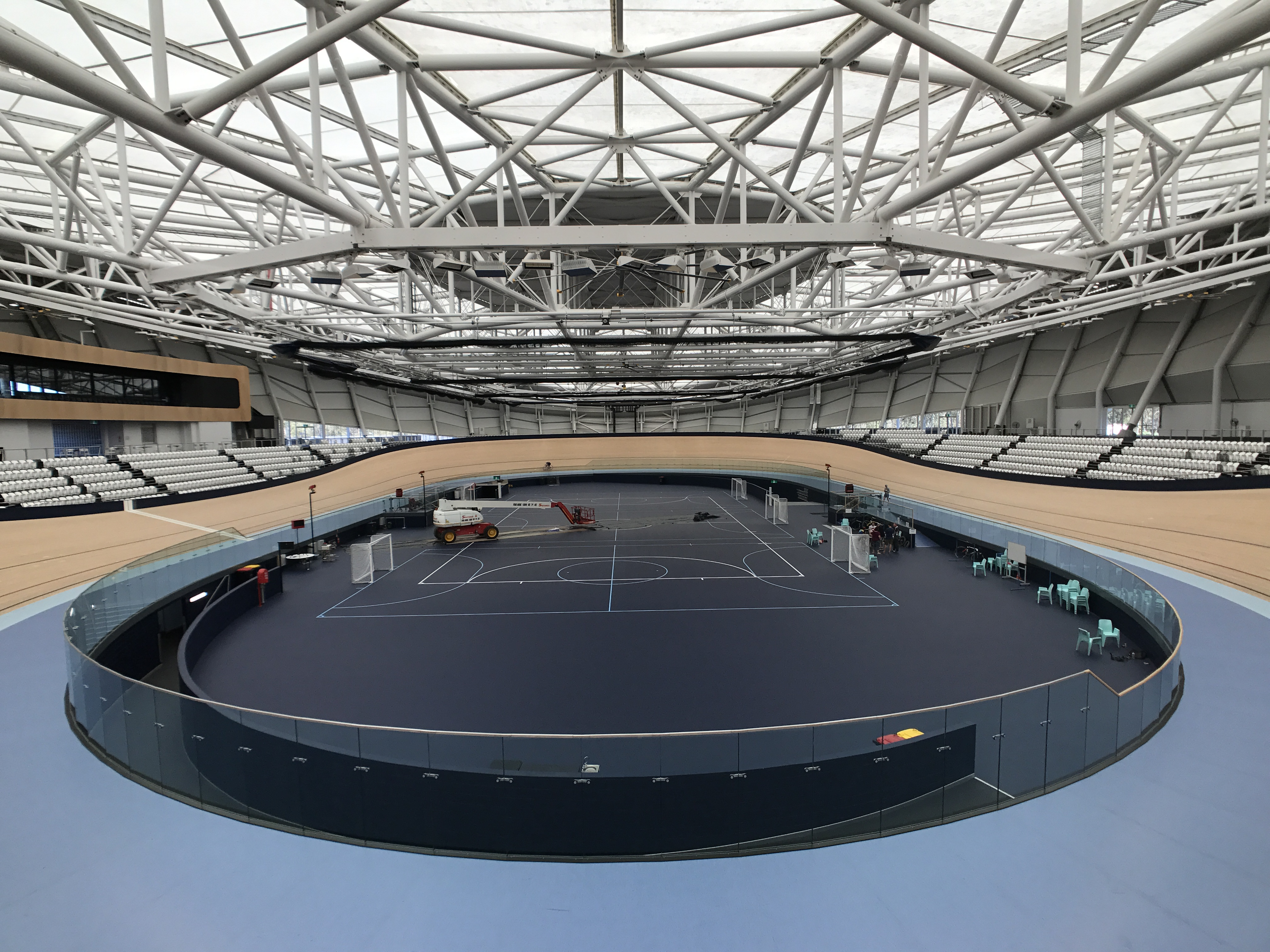
Anna Meares Velodrome hosted Cycling (track)

The Games was hosted across 18 venues located in the Gold Coast and in Brisbane, Townsville and Cairns. Sporting venues were well ahead available of Gold Coast 2018 ensuring that they were used and tested before the Games. The Australian and Queensland Governments and the City of Gold Coast invested A$320 million to deliver new and upgraded venues. Lendlease was the overlay delivery partner and official supporter property and infrastructure of the Games.

==== Venues on the Gold Coast ====
Carrara Stadium, located in the suburb of Carrara, was the main venue for athletics, the opening ceremony and the closing ceremony. The seating capacity of the stadium was temporarily increased to 40,000 for the Games by the installation of a large temporary stand in the north end. The new Carrara Sports and Leisure Centre hosted the Badminton, Para Powerlifting, Weightlifting and Wrestling events. The Carrara Indoor Sports Stadium hosted the back-of-house event operations.

The Gold Coast Convention and Exhibition Centre, located in the suburb of Broadbeach, hosted the basketball finals and netball preliminaries and also served as the Main Media Centre and International Broadcast centre hosting over 3,000 members of the worlds press. The Broadbeach Bowls Club hosted the Bowls competition.

The Nerang National Park was the location for the mountain bike competition. A new course was constructed to meet international competition requirements and temporary spectator seating for 2,000 spectators.

The newly built Coomera Indoor Sports Centre hosted gymnastics and netball finals. The Oxenford Studios hosted the sports of boxing, table tennis and squash. During Games mode, the venue was enhanced to provide for each sporting federation's technical venue requirements and provide spectator seating. The Gold Coast Hockey Centre hosted the men's and women's field hockey events. The Southport Broadwater Parklands hosted Triathlon, Marathon and Racewalking events. The Optus aquatic centre hosted the Swimming and Diving events.

Robina Stadium hosted the rugby sevens competition, and was upgraded to meet World Rugby standards. The Currumbin Beachfront hosted the road racing elements of the cycling programme. Coolangatta Beachfront hosted the Beach volleyball event.

==== Venues outside Gold Coast ====
Brisbane, along with the Gold Coast, forms part of the South East Queensland conurbation. Track cycling was held at the Sleeman Sports Complex in the suburb of Chandler, where a new velodrome was built.

The shooting disciplines were held at the Belmont Shooting Centre. In Tropical North Queensland, the Cairns Convention Centre and Townsville Entertainment Centre hosted the preliminary rounds of basketball.

=== Athletes village ===
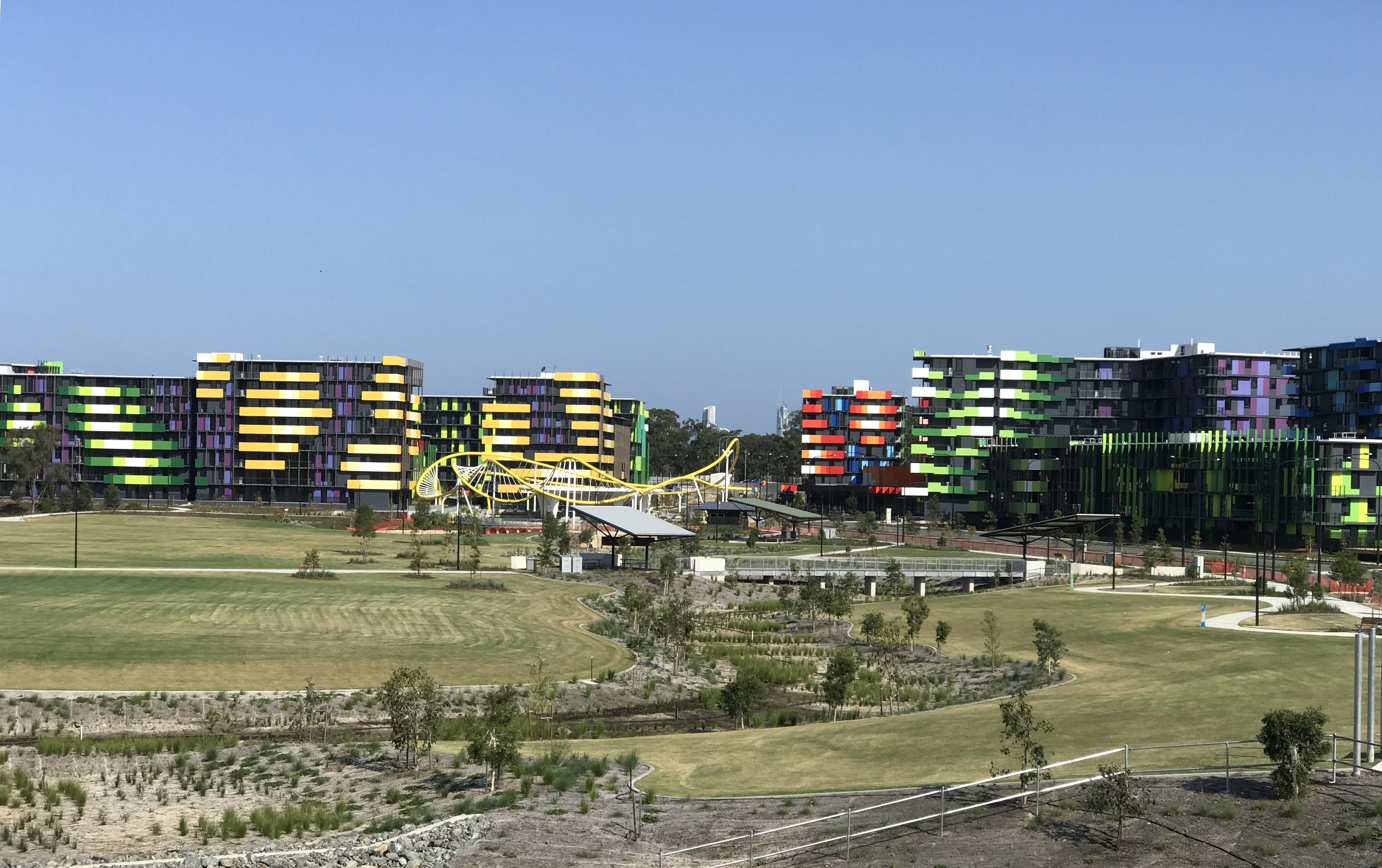
The 2018 Commonwealth Games Athletes Village

The Athletes Village was officially opened from 25 March 2018 and provided accommodation and services to 6,600 athletes and officials in 1252 permanent dwellings. It was located in Southport, Gold Coast. There were 1,170 one and two-bedroom apartments and 82 three-bedroom townhouses. The village had three zones - International, Residential and Operational.

The residential zone accommodated athletes and officials and also offered recreation, gym and medical facilities. The equipment in the gym was provided by Technogym. Adjoining the gym was the Athlete Recovery Area. The International Zone consisted of retail services, shops and the main dining hall. The Festival 2018 events were also held in the International Zone. The Dining hall served over 18,000 meals per day to the athletes during the Games. Australian telecommunications company Optus opened a store in the International zone named "Yes Optus Store" which provided free calling services to the athletes and officials and other services such as phone charging and watching events of the Games in televisions. Optus also provided free Wi-Fi services in the village.

=== Financing ===
The sports-related costs of Gold Coast 2018 was A$1.5 billion (US$1.2 billion).

=== Countdown ===
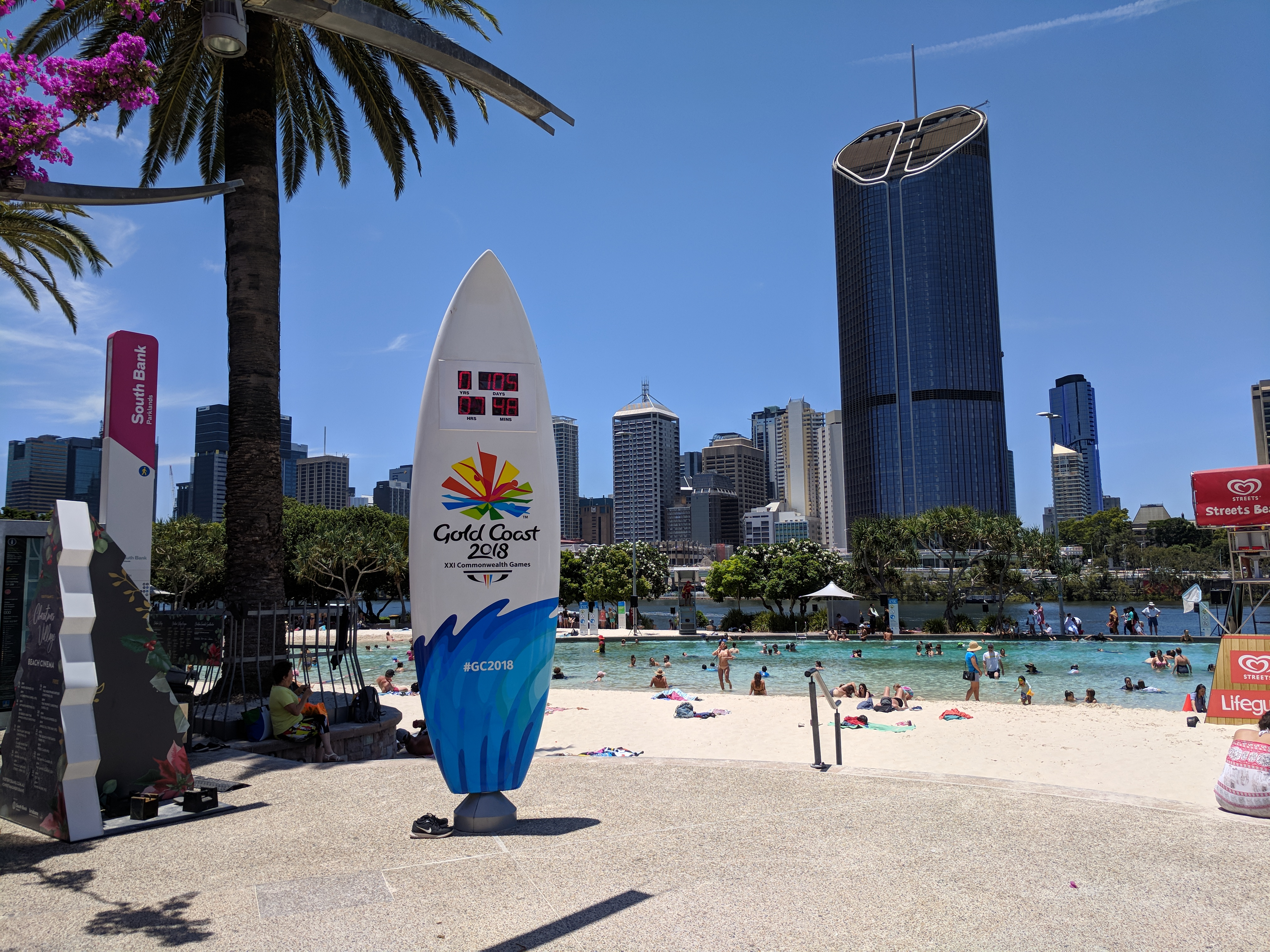
Countdown clock in Streets Beach at South Bank Parklands

The countdown clocks were unveiled on 4 April 2013, exactly five years from the opening ceremony of the Games. The clocks were shaped as a surfboard and were located at the beach end of Cavill Avenue in Surfers Paradise and in South Bank Parklands in Brisbane. The Countdown Clock was the first fixed element of the Commonwealth Games visual identity program.

=== Ticketing ===
The ticket requests began on 24 April 2017 and ended on 22 May 2017. The first round of tickets were allocated on 22 June 2017 via a computer-generated ballot system. About 70% of the people who applied for the tickets had received some or all of the tickets requested in the first phase. In Australia, ticket prices ranged from A$10 for many events to A$495 for the most expensive seats at the opening ceremony. The games expected to have 1.2 million tickets for sale. Around 1.06 million tickets were sold by 3 April 2018. Ticketek was the provider of ticketing services for the Games.

=== Queen's baton relay ===
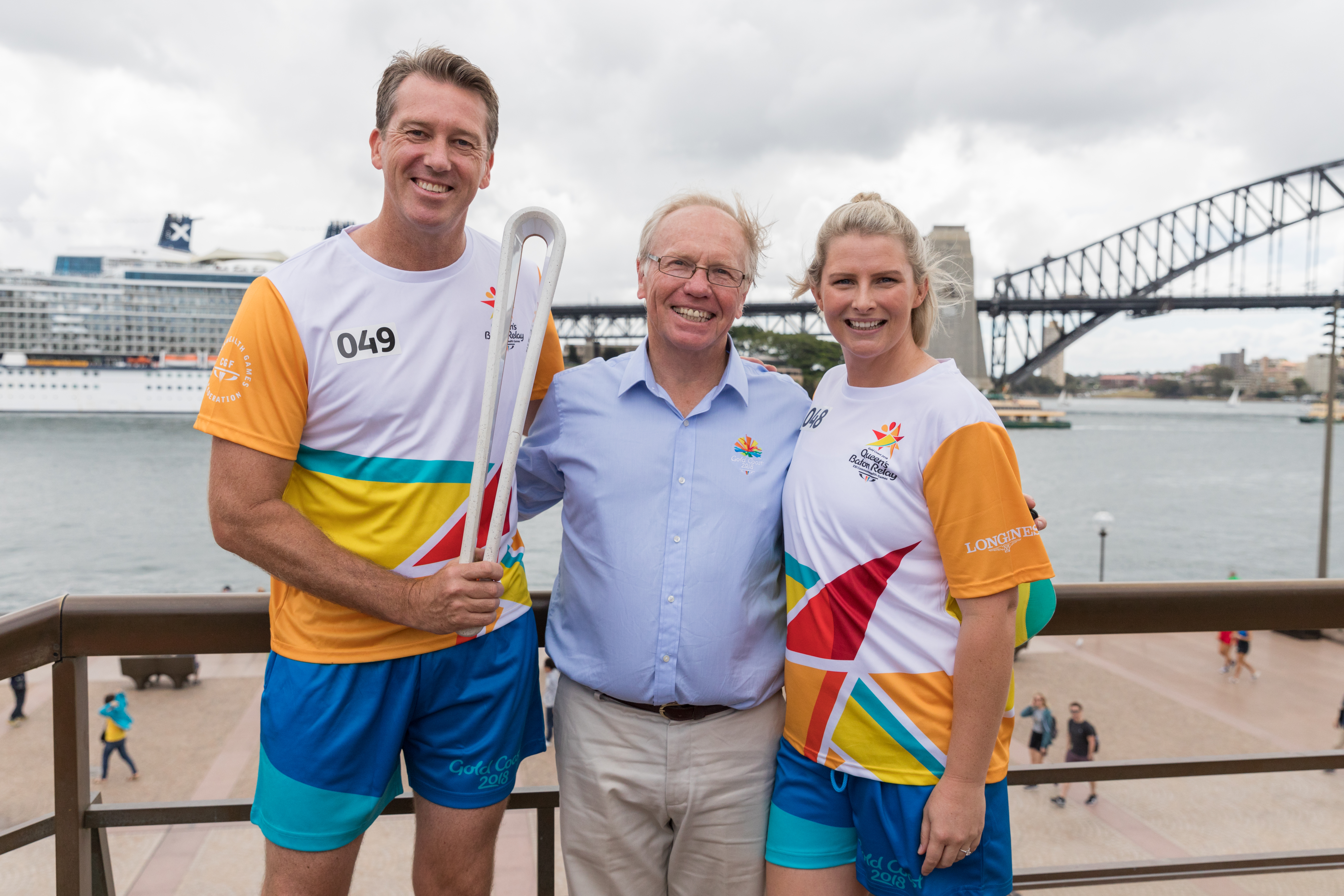
Glenn McGrath holding the Queen's baton with Peter Beattie (GOLDOC chairman) and Leisel Jones in Sydney

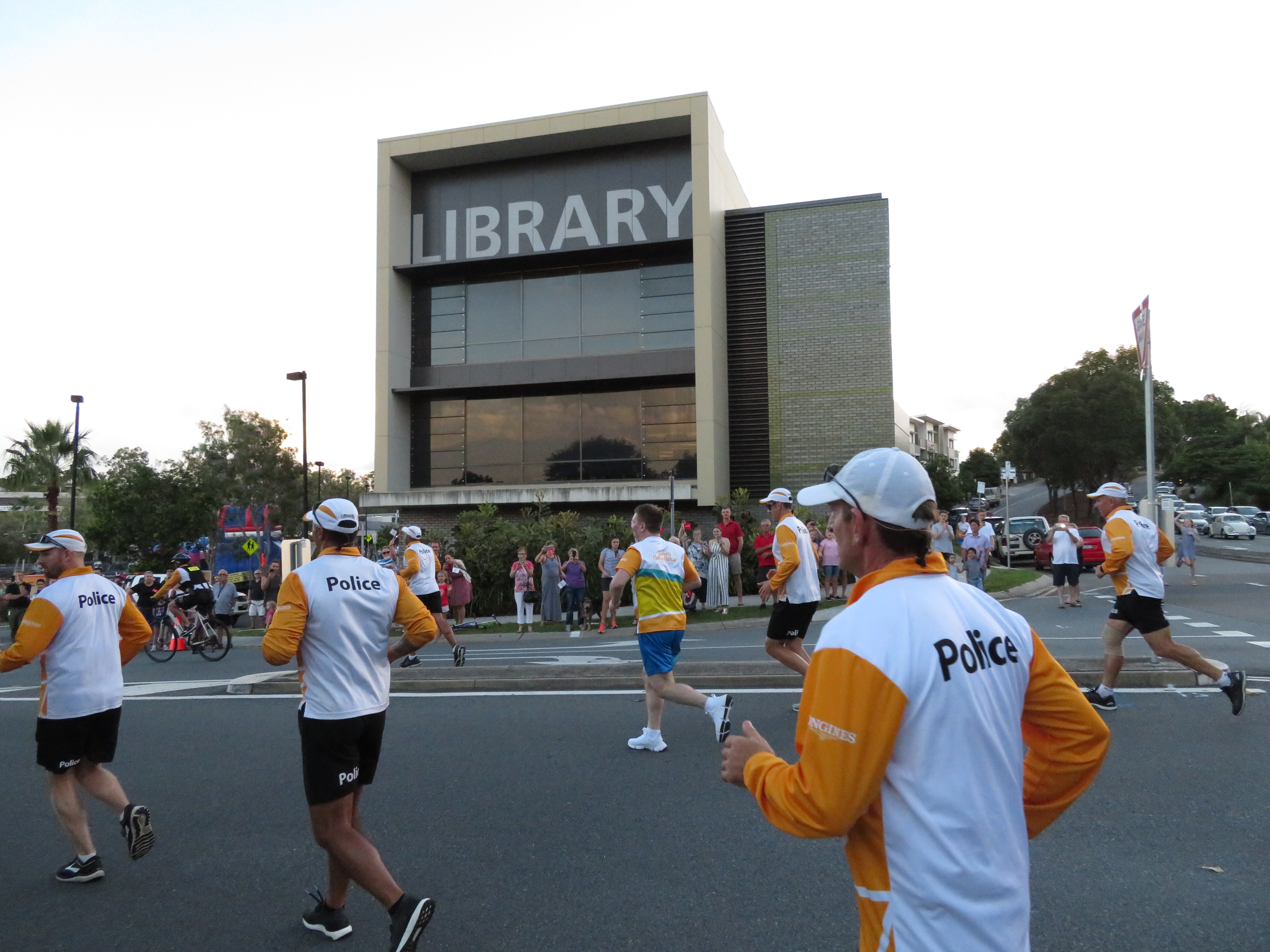
The 2018 Queen's Baton Relay passing in front of Helensvale Library

The Queen's baton of the 2018 Commonwealth Games had a distinctive loop design and was made of macadamia wood and recycled plastic sourced from Gold Coast waterways. Its design was inspired by the Queensland's "vibrant spirit and indigenous heritage" and with sustainability.

The design of the baton was unveiled on 20 November 2016 at a ceremony at the Jupiter Gold Coast hotel. The baton was designed by the Brisbane-based firm Designworks. At the 2018 Good Design Awards conducted by the Good Design Australia, the baton won the Best Product Sport and Lifestyle award.

The Queen's baton relay was launched on Commonwealth Day, 13 March 2017, on the historic forecourt at Buckingham Palace in London, signalling the official countdown to the start of the Games. Accompanied by the Duke of Edinburgh and Prince Edward, Her Majesty Queen Elizabeth II heralded the start of the relay by placing her 'message to the Commonwealth and its athletes' into the distinctive loop-design Queen's Baton which then set off on its journey around the globe.

The baton traveled for 388 days, spending time in every nation and territory of the Commonwealth. The Gold Coast 2018 Queen's Baton Relay was the longest in Commonwealth Games history. Covering 230,000 km over 388 days, the baton made its way through the six Commonwealth regions of Africa, the Americas, the Caribbean, Europe, Asia and Oceania. The baton landed on Australian soil in December 2017 and then spent 100 days travelling through Australia, finishing its journey at the opening ceremony on 4 April 2018, where the message was removed from the Baton and read aloud by Charles, Prince of Wales.

Tourism Australia and QSuper sponsored the international and Australian segment of Queen's Baton Relay respectively, while Longines sponsored both the segments.

=== Medals ===
The medals for the Games were officially unveiled at a charity gala held on 4 November 2017. Australian Indigenous artist Delvene Cockatoo-Collins designed the medals, while they were produced by the Royal Australian Mint. The design of the medals was inspired by the coastline of Gold Coast along with Indigenous culture.

Furthermore, Cockatoo-Collins mentioned, "the medal design represents soft sand lines which shift with every tide and wave, also symbolic of athletic achievement, The continual change of tide represents the evolution in athletes who are making their mark, Records are made and special moments of elation are celebrated". Approximately 1,500 medals were created to be distributed to the medalists and each measures approximately 63 millimetres in diameter. The medals weigh between 138 and 163 grams.

=== Volunteering ===
Over 15,000 volunteers were hired for the Games. Over 45,000 applicants applied to become a volunteer. The uniforms for the volunteers were revealed on 11 November 2017 at the Gold Coast Convention and Exhibition Centre. Former Gold Coast Titans player Mat Rogers who was present at the uniform showcase ceremony, said that the uniforms were "very Gold Coast" and it was like an "active wear". Hard Yakka was the official supplier of the uniforms for the volunteers.

=== Transport ===
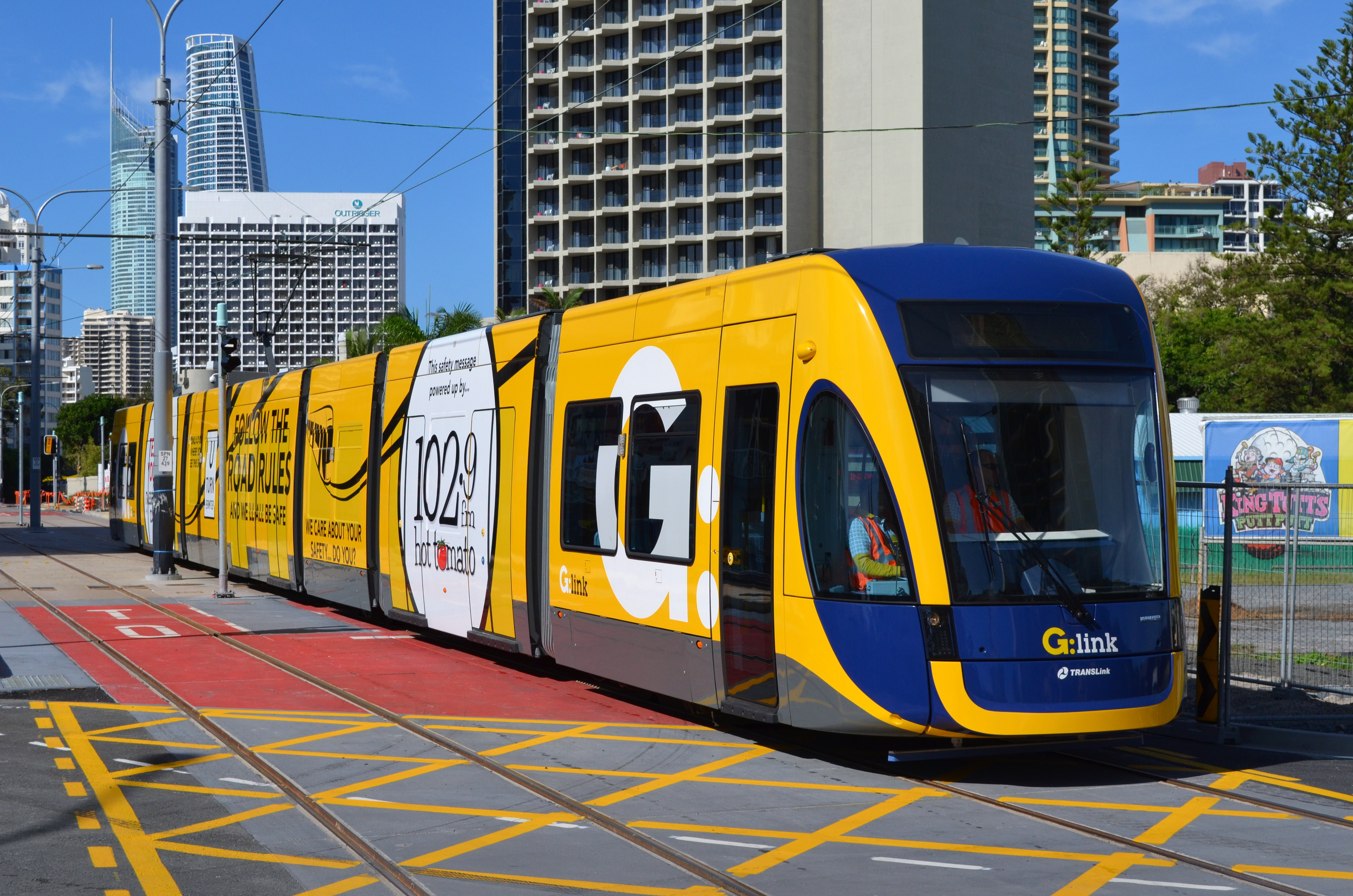
Gold Coast light rail

During the Games period, free public transportation within Queensland region was provided to ticket and accreditation holders. The free transportation services were available on local buses, train and Gold Coast light rail (G:link) services on the Gold Coast and on TransLink and Qconnect bus services in Cairns and Townsville.

The Gold Coast light rail system, connected a number of the key Games venues, including the Gold Coast Aquatic Centre, Broadwater Parklands and the Gold Coast Convention & Exhibition Centre, with the major accommodation centres of Surfers Paradise and Broadbeach and the Athletes Village at Parklands. An extension to the system was announced in October 2015, connecting the then current terminus at Gold Coast University Hospital to the railway line to Brisbane at Helensvale. The extension opened in December 2017, in time for the games.

Four temporary Games lanes were introduced along the M1 and activated at different times to decrease traffic disruptions for road users. These were used by police and emergency vehicles, spectator shuttle buses and accredited Games family and athletes. The Gold Coast Airport served as the official airport for the Games.

=== Security ===
A total of 3,500 police officers from Queensland and 4,000 security personnel from the Australian security companies MSS Security, Wilson Security, SecureCorp and SNP were present at the Games. The Australian Defence Force (ADF) assisted Gold Coast authorities in ensuring the security of the Games and deployed over 1,000 personnel to help with the effort.

Furthermore, Operation ATLAS was the codename for the ADF contribution to the security of the Games. The Australian Federal Police and Australian Border Force assisted the Queensland Police Service (QPS) who were the lead agency of the Games' security. American cyber security software company Symantec provided IT and cyber security services for the Games.

=== Anti-doping ===
The Australian Sports Anti-Doping Authority conducted an anti-doping drive in the months prior to the Games, covering around 2500 tests of Australian athletes, as well as 500 tests against international athletes. Three Australians failed drug tests in this process, along with around 20 international athletes, subject to appeal. The Commonwealth Games Federation conducted in-competition testing and, matching protocol at the Olympic Games, launched a sample storage initiative to allow for future testing of samples up to ten years later, should detection technology improve.

=== Festival 2018 ===
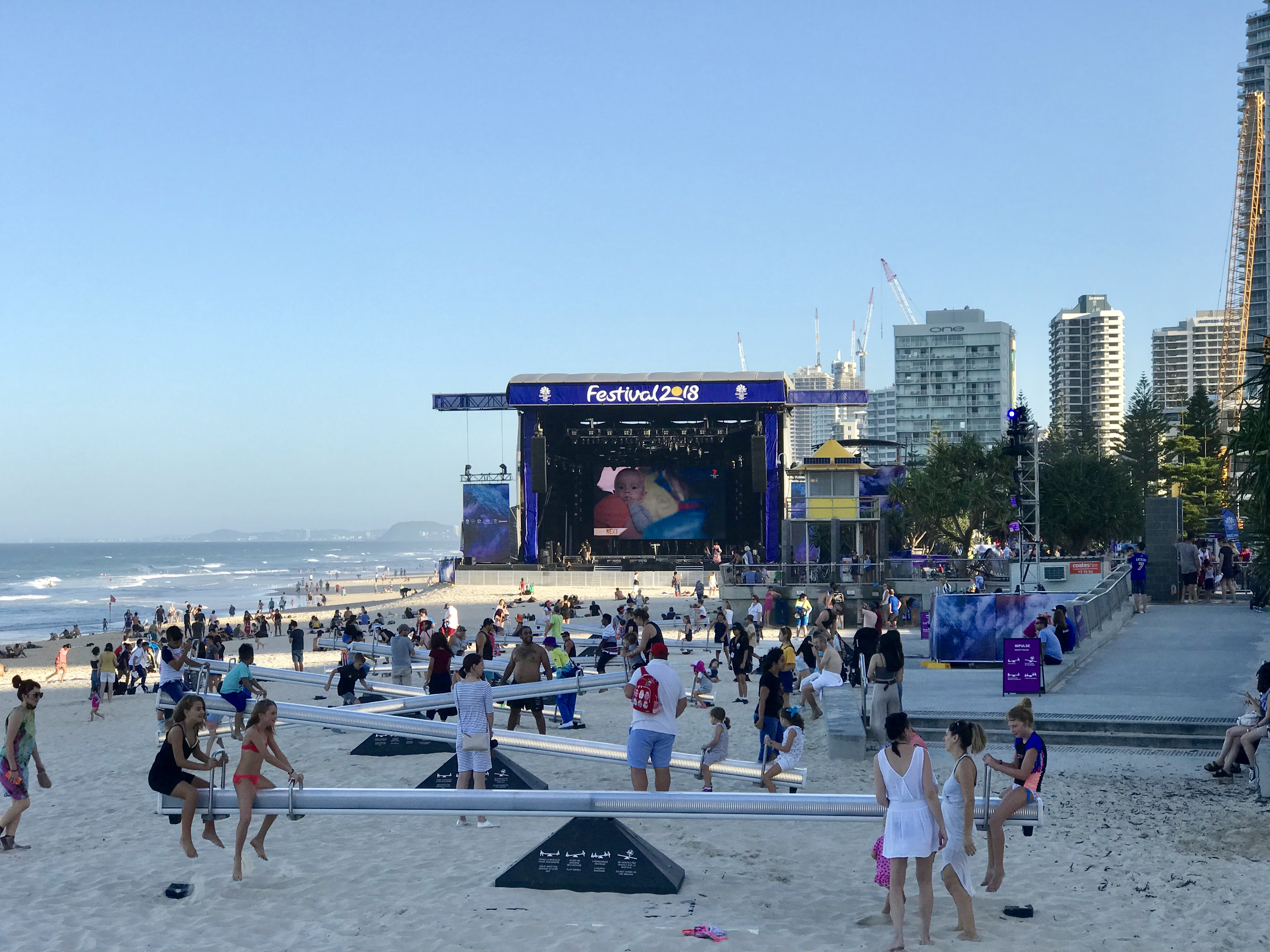
Festival 2018 stage at the Surfers Paradise beach, Queensland during the Games

The Festival 2018 was a 12-day multi-arts program for the 2018 Commonwealth Games which included free musical performances, activities, public art and other family-friendly events. The program took place at Surfers Paradise and Broadbeach on the Gold Coast, Cultural Forecourt, South Bank in Brisbane, Lagoon Precinct in Cairns and Jezzine Barracks, Strand Park and Queens Gardens in Townsville.

=== Sustainability ===
The GOLDOC delivered the event with a focus on sustainability under the guidance of the ISO 20121 event sustainability management system and the Global Reporting Initiative (GRI) framework Sustainability Reporting Standards. The GOLDOC received the Sustainability Award in the Australian Business Awards 2016 for focusing on sustainable practices and planning in the preparation of the games. The GOLDOC headquarters received the 4 Star Green Star – Interiors PILOT rating from the Green Building Council of Australia. The new Anna Meares Velodrome, built specifically for the games, is the first velodrome in the world to have full LED broadcast-quality lighting that cuts energy consumption by up to 60% and reduces running costs and carbon emissions.

=== Opening ceremony ===
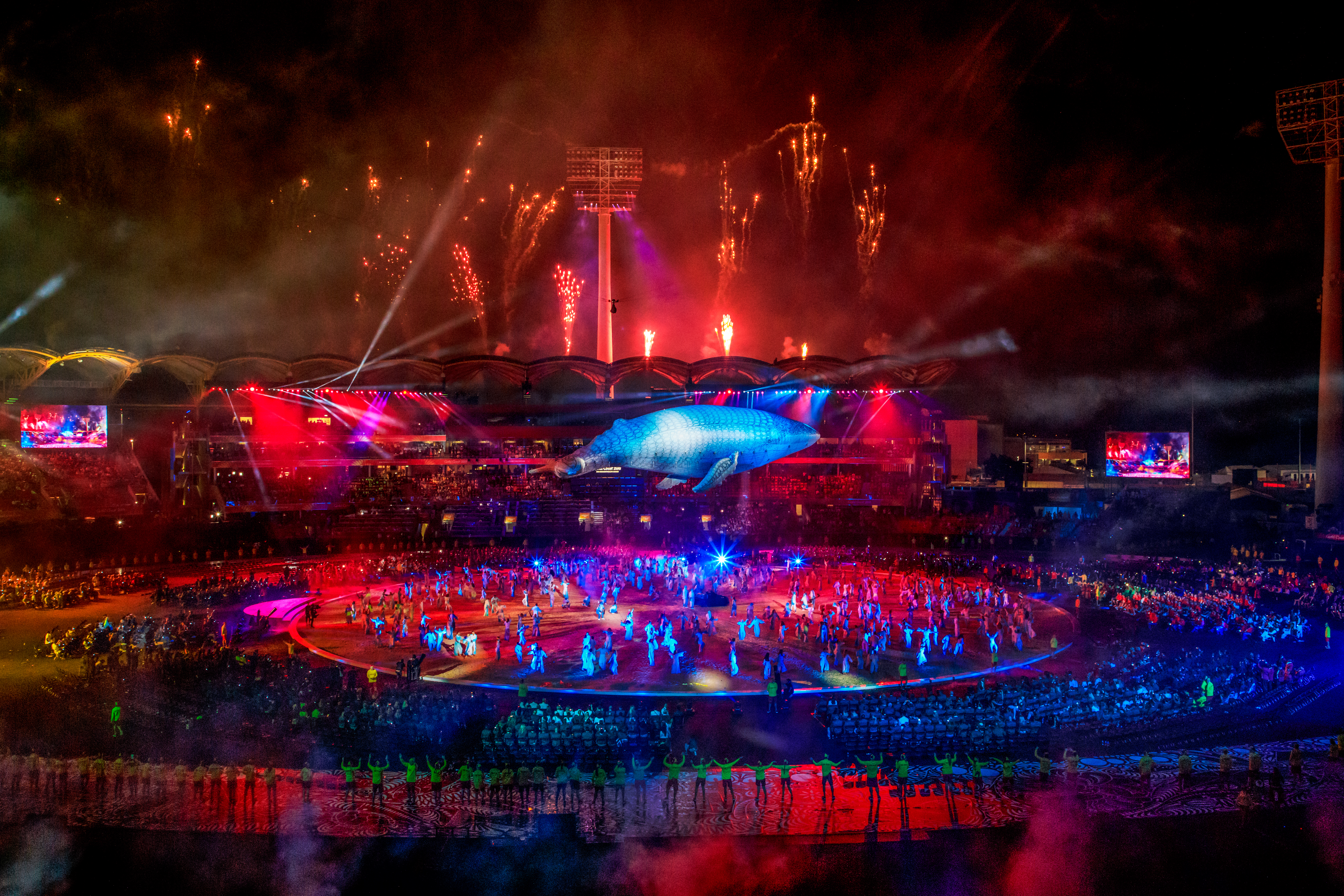
Opening ceremony of the 2018 Commonwealth Games at the Carrara Stadium

The opening ceremony was held at Carrara Stadium on the Gold Coast, between 20:00 and 22:40 AEST, on 4 April 2018. The Head of the Commonwealth, Queen Elizabeth II, was represented by her son, Charles, Prince of Wales. David Zolkwer was its artistic director, with music direction by Katie Noonan. Live musical performers included Christine Anu, Delta Goodrem, Katie Noonan, Ricki-Lee Coulter and Ruel who performed "Golden Years" as the closing act. The ceremony transmitted live on Channel 7 attracted a peak viewing audience of over 2 million in Australia.

=== Closing ceremony ===
The closing ceremony was held at Carrara Stadium on Sunday 15 April 2018 and was produced by Jack Morton Worldwide at a cost of A$30 million. Australian pop stars Guy Sebastian, Samantha Jade, Dami Im, Ricki Lee and The Veronicas were among the performers. Prince Edward, Earl of Wessex, declared the Games closed and passed the Commonwealth Games flag to Birmingham, England which will host the 2022 Games.

== The Games ==
=== Participating Commonwealth Games Associations ===
There were 71 Commonwealth Games Associations competing at 2018 Commonwealth Games. Maldives were scheduled to participate, but in October 2016 they withdrew from the Commonwealth. The Gambia returned to the Commonwealth Games after being readmitted as a Commonwealth Games Federation member on 31 March 2018.

It marked the last time that Swaziland participated in the games before being renamed as Eswatini.

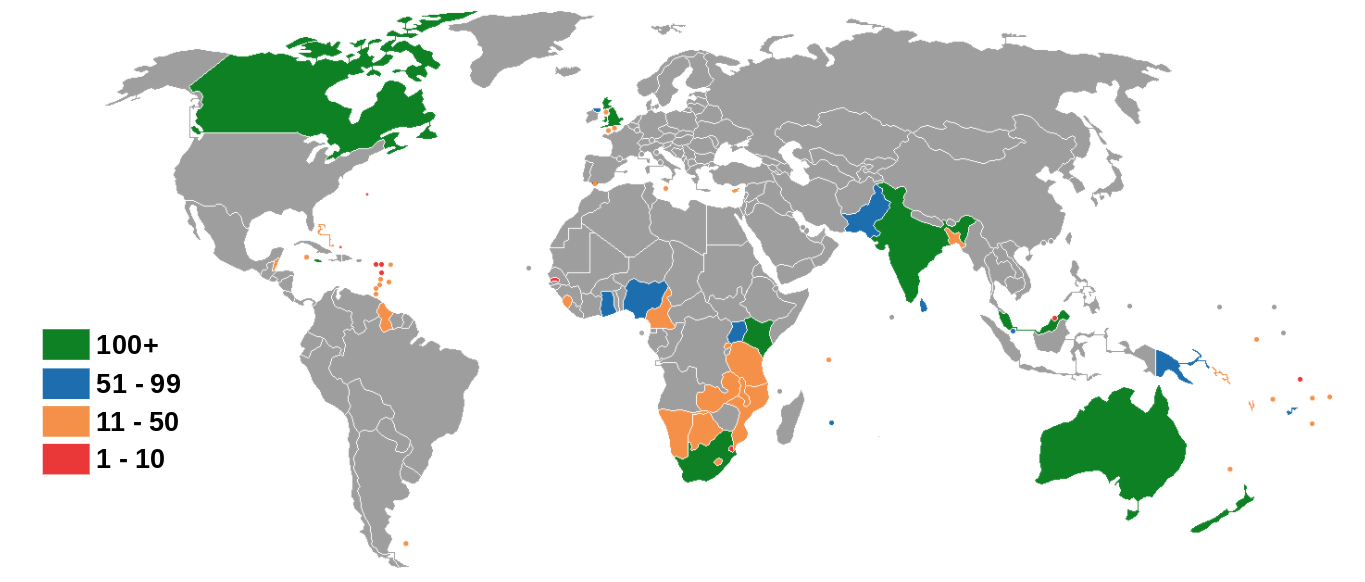
Team Sizes of Countries Participating in the 2018 Commonwealth Games

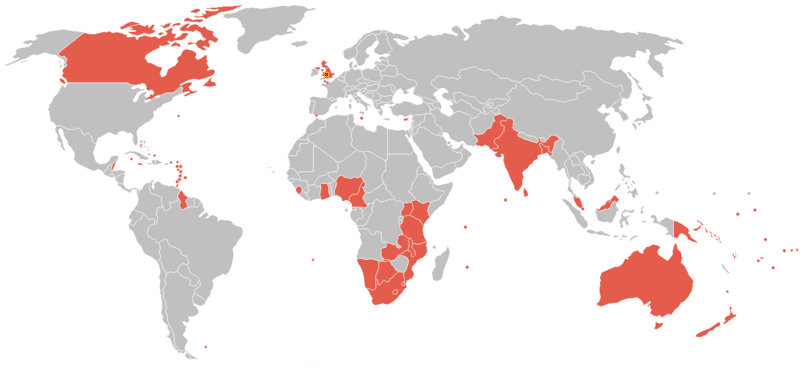
Nations that competed at the 2018 Commonwealth Games on the Gold Coast

Participating Commonwealth Games Associations: country name (number of participants)
- Anguilla (12)
- Antigua and Barbuda (17)
- Australia (469) (hosts)
- Bahamas (31)
- Bangladesh (23)
- Barbados (45)
- Belize (12)
- Bermuda (8)
- Botswana (26)
- British Virgin Islands (10)
- Brunei (8)
- Cameroon (40)
- Canada (282)
- Cayman Islands (21)
- Cook Islands (18)
- Cyprus (46)
- Dominica (13)
- England (390)
- Falkland Islands (15)
- Fiji (96)
- The Gambia (6)
- Ghana (71)
- Gibraltar (22)
- Grenada (14)
- Guernsey (31)
- Guyana (23)
- India (216)
- Isle of Man (31)
- Jamaica (106)
- Jersey (33)
- Kenya (136)
- Kiribati (14)
- Lesotho (20)
- Malawi (19)
- Malaysia (177)
- Malta (24)
- Mauritius (54)
- Montserrat (7)
- Mozambique (26)
- Namibia (28)
- Nauru (16)
- New Zealand (251)
- Nigeria (88)
- Niue (19)
- Norfolk Island (18)
- Northern Ireland (90)
- Pakistan (56)
- Papua New Guinea (56)
- Rwanda (17)
- Saint Helena (9)
- Saint Kitts and Nevis (7)
- Saint Lucia (13)
- Saint Vincent and the Grenadines (20)
- Samoa (38)
- Scotland (226)
- Seychelles (25)
- Sierra Leone (24)
- Singapore (59)
- Solomon Islands (14)
- South Africa (194)
- Sri Lanka (79)
- Swaziland (10)
- Tanzania (15)
- Tonga (13)
- Trinidad and Tobago (51)
- Turks and Caicos Islands (7)
- Tuvalu (7)
- Uganda (69)
- Vanuatu (18)
- Wales (213)
- Zambia (36)

=== Number of athletes by Commonwealth Games Association ===
CGF Code	Country	Athletes
AUS	Australia	469
ENG	England	390
CAN	Canada	282
NZL	New Zealand	251
SCO	Scotland	226
IND	India	216
WAL	Wales	213
RSA	South Africa	194
MAS	Malaysia	177
KEN	Kenya	136
JAM	Jamaica	106
FIJ	Fiji	96
NIR	Northern Ireland	90
NGR	Nigeria	88
SRI	Sri Lanka	79
GHA	Ghana	71
UGA	Uganda	69
SIN	Singapore	59
PAK	Pakistan	56
PNG	Papua New Guinea	56
MRI	Mauritius	54
TTO	Trinidad and Tobago	51
CYP	Cyprus	46
BAR	Barbados	45
CMR	Cameroon	40
SAM	Samoa	38
ZAM	Zambia	36
JEY	Jersey	33
BAH	Bahamas	31
GGY	Guernsey	31
IOM	Isle of Man	31
NAM	Namibia	28
BOT	Botswana	26
MOZ	Mozambique	26
SEY	Seychelles	25
MLT	Malta	24
SLE	Sierra Leone	24
BAN	Bangladesh	23
GUY	Guyana	23
GIB	Gibraltar	22
CAY	Cayman Islands	21
LES	Lesotho	20
SVG	Saint Vincent and the Grenadines	20
MAW	Malawi	19
NIU	Niue	19
COK	Cook Islands	18
NFI	Norfolk Island	18
VAN	Vanuatu	18
ANT	Antigua and Barbuda	17
RWA	Rwanda	17
NRU	Nauru	16
FAI	Falkland Islands	15
TAN	Tanzania	15
GRN	Grenada	14
KIR	Kiribati	14
SOL	Solomon Islands	14
DMA	Dominica	13
LCA	Saint Lucia	13
TGA	Tonga	13
AIA	Anguilla	12
BIZ	Belize	12
IVB	British Virgin Islands	10
SWZ	Swaziland	10
SHN	Saint Helena	9
BER	Bermuda	8
BRU	Brunei	8
MNT	Montserrat	7
SKN	Saint Kitts and Nevis	7
TCA	Turks and Caicos Islands	7
TUV	Tuvalu	7
GAM	The Gambia	6

=== Sports ===
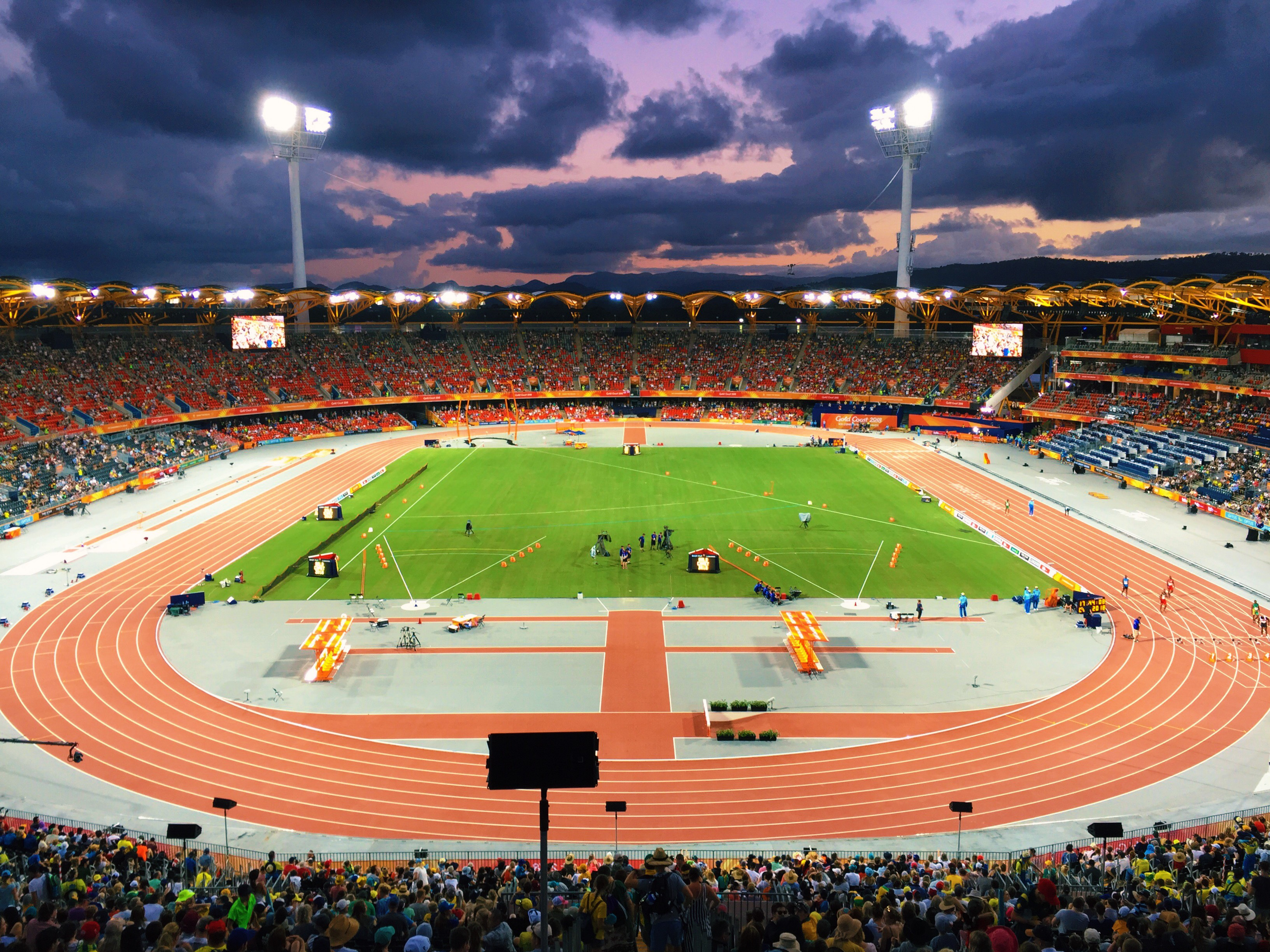
Carrara Stadium during the 2018 Commonwealth Games

The 2018 Commonwealth Games featured 18 different sports encompassing 23 disciplines and 275 events. In the list below, the number of events in each discipline is noted in parentheses.

2018 Commonwealth Games Sports Programme

- Aquatics
  - Diving (10)
  - Swimming (50)
- Athletics (58)
- Badminton (6)
- Basketball (2)
- Beach volleyball (2)
- Boxing (16)
- Cycling
  - Mountain biking (2)
  - Road (4)
  - Track (20)
- Gymnastics
  - Artistic (14)
  - Rhythmic (6)
- Field hockey (2)
- Lawn bowls (10)
- Netball (1)
- Powerlifting (4)
- Rugby sevens (2)
- Shooting (19)
- Squash (5)
- Table tennis (9)
- Triathlon (5)
- Weightlifting (16)
- Wrestling (12)

The regulations stated that from the 26 approved sports administered by Commonwealth Governing Bodies, a minimum of ten core sports and maximum of seventeen sports must be included in any Commonwealth Games schedule.

The approved sports included the 10 core sports: athletics, badminton, boxing, hockey, lawn bowls, netball (for women), rugby sevens, squash, swimming and weightlifting. Integrated disabled competitions were also scheduled for the Games in seven sports: swimming, athletics, cycling, table tennis, powerlifting and lawn bowls, and for the first time, triathlon. A record 38 para events were contested at these games. On 8 March 2016, beach volleyball was announced as the 18th sport.

The program was broadly similar to that of the 2014 Commonwealth Games, with the major changes being the dropping of judo, the reintroduction of basketball, the debut of women's rugby sevens and beach volleyball.

On 7 October 2016, it was announced seven new events for women were added to the sport program, meaning there are an equal number of events for men and women. This marked the first time in history that a major multi-sport event had equality in terms of events. In total 275 events in 18 sports are being contested.

=== Calendar ===
OC	Opening ceremony	●	Event competitions	1	Gold medal events	CC	Closing ceremony

April 2018		4th Wed	5th Thu	6th Fri	7th Sat	8th Sun	9th Mon	10th Tue	11th Wed	12th Thu	13th Fri	14th Sat	15th Sun	Events
Ceremonies		OC											CC	—N/a
Aquatics	Diving								3	2	3	2		60
Aquatics	Swimming		7	9	8	8	9	9						60
Athletics						5	6	8	7	10	9	9	4	58
Badminton			●	●	●	●	1	●	●	●	●	●	5	6
Basketball			●	●	●	●	●	●			●	1	1	2
Beach volleyball				●	●	●	●	●	●	2				2
Boxing			●	●	●	●	●	●	●		●	16		16
Cycling
Cycling	Mountain biking									2				26
Cycling	Road cycling							2				2		26
Cycling	Track cycling		6	4	6	4								26
Gymnastics
Gymnastics	Artistic		1	1	2	5	5							20
Gymnastics	Rhythmic								1	1	4			20
Hockey			●	●	●	●	●	●	●	●	●	2		2
Lawn bowls			●	●	●	2	2	●	1	2	3			10
Netball			●	●	●	●	●	●	●	●		●	1	1
Para powerlifting								4						4
Rugby sevens											●	●	2	2
Shooting						3	3	3	3	1	3	3		19
Squash			●	●	●	●	2	●	●	●	●	1	2	5
Table tennis			●	●	●	1	1	●	●	●	1	4	2	9
Triathlon			2		3									5
Weightlifting			3	3	3	3	4							16
Wrestling										4	4	4		12
Daily medal events			19	17	22	31	33	26	15	24	27	44	17	275
Cumulative total			19	36	58	89	122	148	163	187	214	258	275	275
April 2018		4th Wed	5th Thu	6th Fri	7th Sat	8th Sun	9th Mon	10th Tue	11th Wed	12th Thu	13th Fri	14th Sat	15th Sun	Total events

=== Medal table ===
Only the top ten most successful nations are displayed here. The ranking in this table is consistent with the International Olympic Committee convention in its published medal tables. By default, the table is ordered by the number of gold medals the athletes from a nation have won (in this context, a "nation" is an entity represented by a Commonwealth Games Association). The number of silver medals is taken into consideration next and then the number of bronze medals. If nations are still tied, equal ranking is given and they are listed alphabetically by their three-letter country code. Australia came in first in the medal table rank with 78 gold, the second being England with 45 gold, and the third being India with 26 gold.

Two bronze medals were awarded in boxing. In four events of wrestling, only five nations entered the event, per Commonwealth Games regulations, only one bronze medal was available. No bronze medal was awarded in the women's 50 metre butterfly S7, women's powerlifting heavyweight, and women's wrestling freestyle 50 kg, as only four athletes competed in the event, and per Commonwealth Games regulations, the bronze medal was not available. At women's tandem sprint B and women's tandem 1 km time trial B only one gold medal was available, as only three nations entered the event.

Additionally, two silver medals were awarded in the men's gymnastics horizontal bar, men's 100 metre freestyle, and the women's 50 metre freestyle as a result of a tie between two athletes. Therefore, the total number of bronze medals is greater than the total number of gold or silver medals.

Key

* Host nation

Rank	CGA	Gold	Silver	Bronze	Total
1	Australia*	80	59	59	198
2	England	45	45	46	136
3	India	26	20	20	66
4	Canada	15	40	27	82
5	New Zealand	15	16	15	46
6	South Africa	13	11	13	37
7	Wales	10	12	14	36
8	Scotland	9	13	22	44
9	Nigeria	9	9	6	24
10	Cyprus	8	1	5	14
11–43	Remaining	45	50	62	157
Totals (43 entries)		275	276	289	840

=== Podium sweeps ===
Date	Sport	Event	Team	Gold	Silver	Bronze
6 April	Swimming	Women's 100 metre butterfly	Australia	Emma McKeon	Madeline Groves	Brianna Throssell
7 April	Swimming	Men's 100 metre breaststroke SB8	Australia	Timothy Disken	Timothy Hodge	Blake Cochrane
8 April	Swimming	Women's 50 metre butterfly	Australia	Cate Campbell	Holly Barratt	Madeline Groves
9 April	Swimming	Men's 200 metre backstroke	Australia	Mitch Larkin	Bradley Woodward	Josh Beaver
9 April	Swimming	Women's 800 metre freestyle	Australia	Ariarne Titmus	Jessica Ashwood	Kiah Melverton
10 April	Swimming	Men's 100 metre backstroke S9	Australia	Brenden Hall	Timothy Hodge	Logan Powell
13 April	Athletics	Men's 3000 metres steeplechase	Kenya	Conseslus Kipruto	Abraham Kibiwott	Amos Kirui

== Broadcasting ==
NEP Australia was the host broadcaster of the event. It produced high definition coverage of the event and delivered to the rights-holding broadcasters of other nations. In Australia, the games were broadcast live on three Seven Network channels - 7HD, 7TWO and 7Mate. In the United Kingdom, BBC provided Commonwealth Games coverage of more than 200 hours across BBC One, BBC Two, BBC Red Button, BBC Sport website, BBC iPlayer and BBC radio. ESPN provided the games coverage for viewers in the USA. Sony Pictures Networks India broadcast the games for the viewers in India on three channels - Sony Six, Sony Ten 2 in English and Sony Ten 3 in Hindi.

Flow Sports provided games coverage in the Caribbean countries and territories such as Anguilla, Antigua and Barbuda, Aruba, The Bahamas, Barbados, Bermuda, British Virgin Islands, Cayman Islands, Dominica, Dominican Republic, Grenada, Guyana, Jamaica, Montserrat, Saint Kitts and Nevis, Saint Vincent and the Grenadines, Saint Lucia, Suriname, Trinidad and Tobago along Turks and Caicos. Flow Sports provided coverage of the event on Flow Sports 1, Flow Sports 2 and up to three additional "Flow Sports Extra" channels.

The New Zealand government funded Pacific Cooperation Broadcasting Limited (PCBL) broadcast the event on Pasifika TV in the Oceanian countries such as Cook Islands, Fiji, Nauru, Niue, Papua New Guinea, Samoa, Solomon Islands, Tonga, Vanuatu, Kiribati and Tuvalu.

Country	Rights holder	Ref
Asia	ABU	
Australia	Seven Network	
Canada	DAZN	
Caribbean	Flow	
Europe	EBU	
India	Sony Pictures Networks India	
Kenya	Citizen TV	
Malaysia	Hypp Sports HD	
Malaysia	Astro	
Malaysia	RTM	
New Zealand	TVNZ	
Oceania	PCBL	
Singapore	Mediacorp	
South Africa	SuperSport	
United Kingdom	BBC	
United States	ESPN	

== Marketing ==
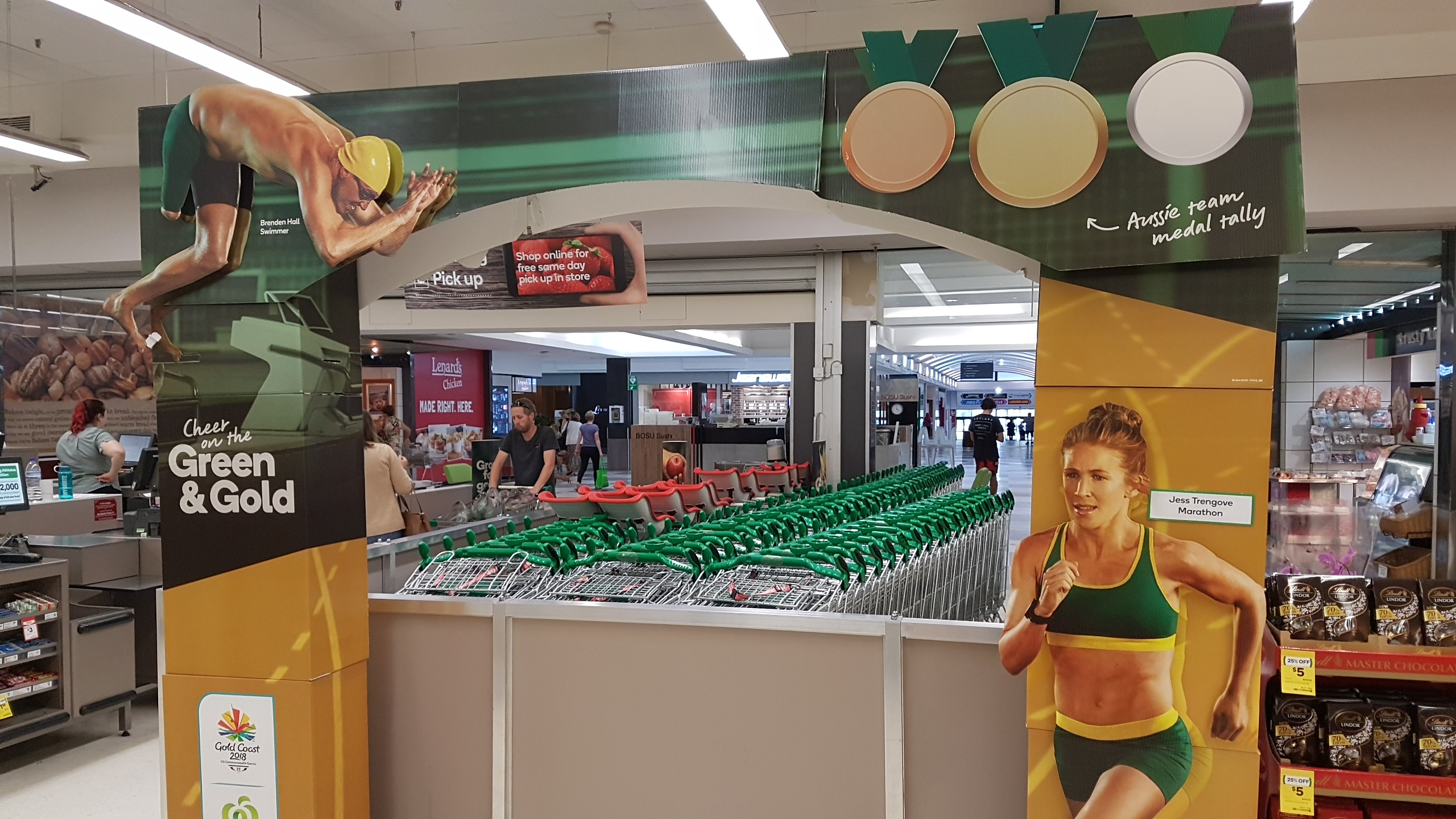
Commonwealth Games display at a Woolworths supermarket in Warwick, Western Australia

=== Motto ===
The official motto for the 2018 Commonwealth Games was "Share the Dream". It was chosen to highlight the dreams and experience at the games that were shared by participants of the games, ranging from athletes to volunteers and the host country Australia to the world including the Commonwealth nations.

=== Emblem ===
The emblem was launched on 4 April 2013, which marked exactly five years until its opening ceremony. It was unveiled at the Southport Broadwater Parklands. It was designed by the New South Wales based brand consultancy WiteKite. The emblem of the 2018 Commonwealth Games was a silhouette of the skyline and landscape of Gold Coast, the host city of the games. Nigel Chamier OAM, former chairman of the GOLDOC, said that it was the result of months of market research.

=== Mascot ===
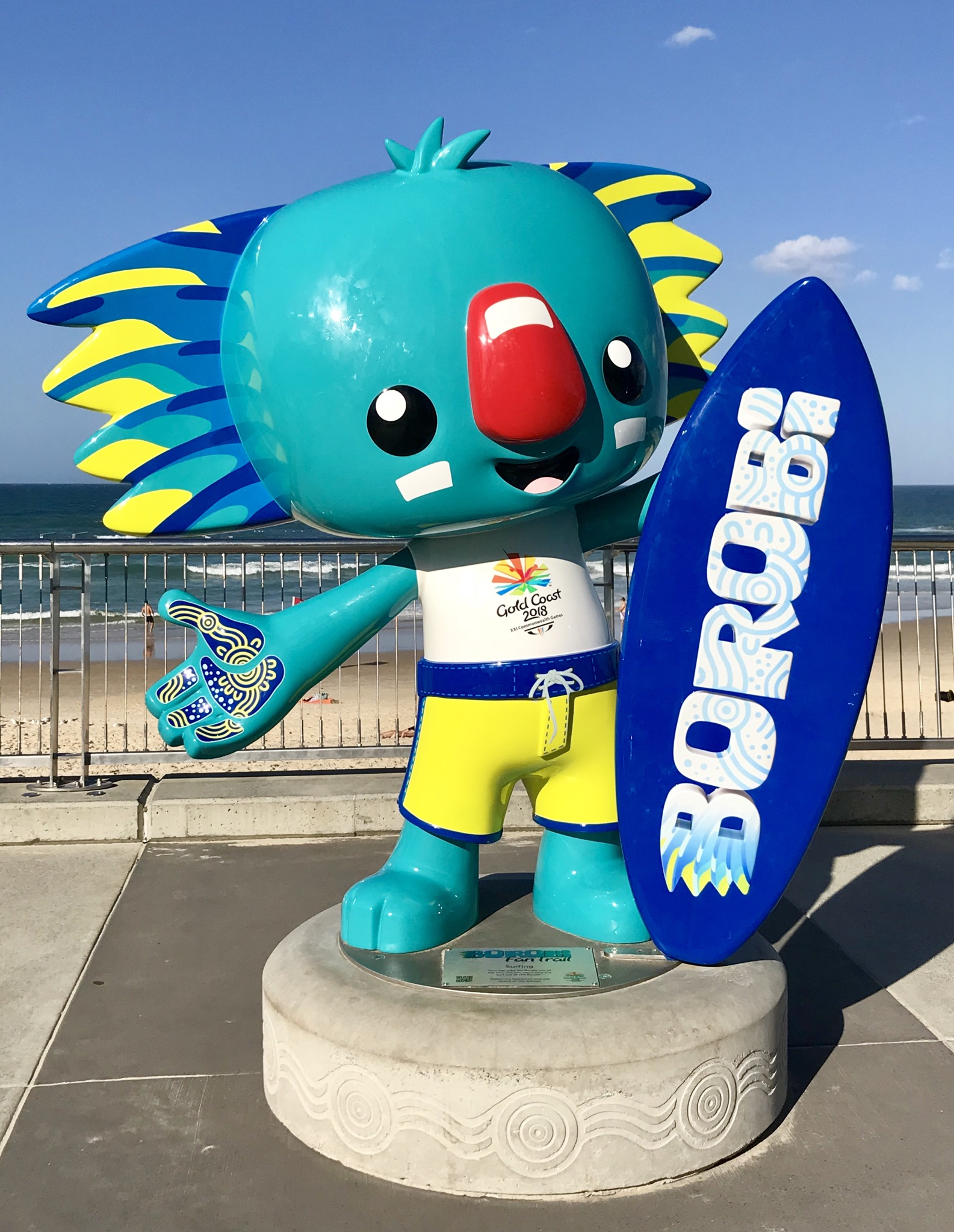
Borobi, the mascot of the 2018 Commonwealth Games

Borobi was named as the mascot of the 2018 Commonwealth Games in 2016. Borobi is a blue koala, with indigenous markings on its body. The term "borobi" means koala in the Yugambeh language, spoken by the indigenous Yugambeh people of the Gold Coast and surrounding areas. The song ''Days of Gold'' composed by the Australian Duo band Busby Marou, which was released on 17 October 2014, was considered as the official song of the mascot Borobi.

=== Sponsors ===
Sponsors of the 2018 Commonwealth Games
Official Partners
- Atos
- Griffith University
- Longines
- Optus
- The Star Gold Coast
- TAFE Queensland
- Woolworths (Australia)
Official Supporters
- Aggreko
- Allianz
- Brisbane Times
- Cisco
- Elastoplast
- Facebook
- Gold Coast Bulletin
- Hard Yakka
- KPMG
- Lendlease
- MinterEllison
- Moreton Hire
- Rapiscan Systems
- RGS Events
- Royal Australian Mint
- SEEK
- Ticketek
- XXXX
Official Suppliers
- Aura Sports
- Benchmark Scaffolding
- Brisbane Airport
- Centium Software
- Coates Hire
- Coca-Cola Amatil
- Cockram Construction
- CSG Limited
- DB Schenker
- Diadora
- Thrifty
- Eleiko
- First Aid Accident & Emergency
- FLIR Systems
- GL events
- Gold Coast Airport
- Hamilton
- Harvey Norman Commercial
- Incognitus
- Isentia
- Kelly Services
- Leonardo
- Mediacom
- Motorola Solutions
- Norwest Productions
- Ottobock
- Peters Ice Cream
- Queensland X-Ray
- R. M. Williams
- Seven Network
- Sold Out Events
- Speedo
- Spieth Gymnastics
- Sportstech Australia
- Sting
- Symantec
- Technogym
- TFH Hire Services
- Tourism Australia
- Winc
- Y&R ANZ
- Zen Catering

=== Music ===
Australian singer Delta Goodrem wrote the song "Welcome to Earth", which is about the planet Earth and the theme of the opening ceremony. She performed the song live during the ceremony and was worldwide praised. The song was worldwide released on 5 April 2018 in Delta Goodrem's official YouTube channel.

== Concerns and controversies ==
Team India violated the Games No-needle policy two times. Just two days before the opening of the Games, a cleaner found needles in a bottle in the Athletes' Village. The Games official found that the syringes belonged to an Indian doctor which he used to inject vitamin B_{12} to an Indian athlete and did not dispose them properly after using them and violated the Games no-needle policy. As a result, the Indian team officials received serious warnings from the Games officials. Later two Indian athletes were suspended from the Games as needles were found in their apartment which was also against the Games policy.

At least 13 athletes from four countries - Cameroon, Uganda, Rwanda, and Sierra Leone - absconded during or immediately after the Games. Some missed their competitions. A month after the games ended, officials estimated that 50 athletes had remained in Australia illegally, with another 200 staying in the country on visas. In October 2019, it was found from the official documents that the Department of Home Affairs had rejected the asylum claims of 217 out of 230 athletes. The official documents also found that 17 "unlawful non-citizens" who took part in the Commonwealth Games were still in Australia, 14 of which were from Ghana and Rwanda. A total of 13 remain unaccounted for, while four were in detention.

The organising committee of the Games decided to bring in the athletes before the start of the closing ceremony. This caused an uproar on social media as, contrary to public expectations, none of the athletes were shown entering the stadium during the ceremony. Broadcast rights holders Channel 7 complained on air about the decision and concluded that, "it hasn't really lived up to expectations". Many spectators and athletes left during the ceremony, resulting in a half-empty stadium for much of the event. Following this, the ABC claimed that Channel 7 was briefed on the closing ceremony schedule, a claim which Channel 7 later refuted.

== Legacy ==
=== Events ===
The city hosted the 17th Sport Accord World Sport and Business Summit from 5 to 10 May 2019 at the Gold Coast Convention and Exhibition Centre.

Queensland Premier Annastacia Palaszczuk announced on 9 December 2019 that the state of Queensland would make an official bid for the 2032 Summer Olympics featuring venues across Brisbane, Gold Coast and Sunshine Coast. Without rival cities, the International Olympic Committee (IOC) awarded the 2032 Olympics to Brisbane.

== See also ==
- Commonwealth Games celebrated in Australia
  - 1938 Commonwealth Games – Sydney
  - 1962 Commonwealth Games – Perth
  - 1982 Commonwealth Games – Brisbane
  - 2006 Commonwealth Games - Melbourne
- Commonwealth Youth Games celebrated in Australia
  - 2004 Commonwealth Youth Games – Bendigo
- Olympic Games celebrated in Australia
  - 1956 Summer Olympics – Melbourne
  - 2000 Summer Olympics – Sydney
  - 2032 Summer Olympics – Brisbane
- Paralympic Games celebrated in Australia
  - 2000 Summer Paralympics – Sydney
  - 2032 Summer Paralympics – Brisbane
- Deaflympics celebrated in Australia
  - 2005 Summer Deaflympics – Melbourne

Preceded by Glasgow	Commonwealth Games; Gold Coast; XXI Commonwealth Games (2018)	Succeeded by Birmingham
