= Squash at the 2014 Commonwealth Games – Men's singles =

Men's singles Squash 2014 Commonwealth Games
- 5th Men's singles squash at the Commonwealth Games
- Location: Glasgow, Scotland
- Venue: Scotstoun Sports Campus
- Date: 24–28 July 2014
- Website cwgsquash.net
- Category: XX Commonwealth Games

The Squash at the 2014 Commonwealth Games held at the Scotstoun Sports Campus, Glasgow. Singles play took place from 24 July to 28 July.

Nick Matthew defeated James Willstrop 11–9, 8–11, 11–5, 6–11, 11–5 in 99 minutes to win the gold medal.

== Medalists ==
Gold	Nick Matthew; England
Silver	James Willstrop; England
Bronze	Peter Barker; England

== Seeds ==
1. Nick Matthew (ENG) (champion)
2. James Willstrop (ENG) (final)
3. Peter Barker (ENG) (bronze medal)
4. Saurav Ghosal (IND) (Fourth place)
5. Cameron Pilley (AUS) (quarterfinals)
6. Alister Walker (BOT) (round of 16)
7. Chris Simpson (GUE) (quarterfinals)
8. Ong Beng Hee (MAS) (first round)
9. Alan Clyne (SCO) (round of 16)
10. Mohd Nafiizwan Adnan (MAS) (round of 16)
11. Ryan Cuskelly (AUS) (round of 16)
12. Campbell Grayson (NZL) (quarterfinals)
13. Martin Knight (NZL) (round of 16)
14. Steven Finitsis (AUS) (round of 16)
15. Ivan Yuen (MAS) (quarterfinals)
16. Greg Lobban (SCO) (round of 16)

== Draws & Results ==
=== Main draw ===
The draw.

==== Finals ====
Quarter finals
1	Nick Matthew (ENG)	11	11	11
7	Chris Simpson (GUE)	7	8	9
5	Cameron Pilley (AUS)	8	4	5
3	Peter Barker (ENG)	11	11	11
4	Saurav Ghosal (IND)	8	7	11	11	11
12	Campbell Grayson (NZL)	11	11	6	8	6
15	Ivan Yuen (MAS)	1	7	3
2	James Willstrop (ENG)	11	11	11

Semi finals
1	Nick Matthew (ENG)	11	13	11
3	Peter Barker (ENG)	3	11	6
4	Saurav Ghosal (IND)	8	8	5
2	James Willstrop (ENG)	11	11	11

Final
1	Nick Matthew (ENG)	11	8	11	6	11
2	James Willstrop (ENG)	9	11	5	11	5
Third place
3	Peter Barker (ENG)	11	6	11	11
4	Saurav Ghosal (IND)	5	11	5	6

==== Top half ====
===== Section 1 =====
First round
1	Nick Matthew (ENG)	11	11	11
Xavier Koenig (MRI)	3	3	1
Ntholeng Lechesa (LES)	0	0	1
Christopher Binnie (JAM)	11	11	11
Harinder Sandhu (IND)	11	11	11
Michael Craig (NIR)	9	5	5
Kevin Hannaway (SVG)	1	2	2
9	Alan Clyne (SCO)	11	11	11
11	Ryan Cuskelly (AUS)	11	11	11
Kenneth Maina (KEN)	7	6	7
Moreina Wei (PNG)	0	2	5
Shawn Delierre (CAN)	11	11	11
Colin Ramasra (TRI)	11	11	8	6	11
Ravindu Laksiri (SRI)	9	6	11	11	6
Julian Jervis (CAY)	7	4	1
7	Chris Simpson (GUE)	11	11	11

Second round
1	Nick Matthew (ENG)	11	11	11
Christopher Binnie (JAM)	4	8	4
Harinder Pal Sandhu (IND)	14	9	15	1	9
9	Alan Clyne (SCO)	12	11	13	11	11
11	Ryan Cuskelly (AUS)	11	11	9	8	11
Shawn Delierre (CAN)	2	7	11	11	8
Colin Ramasra (TRI)	2	4	1
7	Chris Simpson (GUE)	11	11	11

Third round
1	Nick Matthew (ENG)	11	11	11
9	Alan Clyne (SCO)	4	5	8
11	Ryan Cuskelly (AUS)	6	11	5	7
7	Chris Simpson (GUE)	11	9	11	11

Quarter finals
1	Nick Matthew (ENG)	11	11	11
7	Chris Simpson (GUE)	7	8	9

===== Section 2 =====
First round
5	Cameron Pilley (AUS)	11	11	11
Kale Wilson (TRI)	3	2	2
Daniel Zammit-Lewis (MLT)	2	10	0
Sunil Seth (GUY)	11	12	11
Nick Taylor (JER)	11	11	11
Q*	Othneil Bailey (SVG)	6	6	7
Bruce Burrowes (JAM)	3	5	2
16	Greg Lobban (SCO)	11	11	11
10	Mohd Nafi. Adnan (MAS)	11	11	11
Robert Maycock (BER)	2	5	3
Ian Rukunya (UGA)	0	2	0
Peter Creed (WAL)	11	11	11
Mah. Mangaonkar (IND)	11	11	11
Hardeep Reel (KEN)	1	5	7
Manda Chilambwe (ZAM)	4	1	3
3	Peter Barker (ENG)	11	11	11

Second round
5	Cameron Pilley (AUS)	11	11	11
Sunil Seth (GUY)	6	3	9
Nick Taylor (JER)	10	9	8
16	Greg Lobban (SCO)	12	11	11
10	Mohd Nafi. Adnan (MAS)	11	11	13
Peter Creed (WAL)	9	7	11
Mahesh Mangaonkar (IND)	4	6	2
3	Peter Barker (ENG)	11	11	11

Third round
5	Cameron Pilley (AUS)	11	11	11
16	Greg Lobban (SCO)	6	4	6
10	Mohd Nafi. Adnan (MAS)	7	6	3
3	Peter Barker (ENG)	11	11	11

Quarter finals
5	Cameron Pilley (AUS)	8	4	5
3	Peter Barker (ENG)	11	11	11

==== Bottom half ====
===== Section 1 =====
First round
4	Saurav Ghosal (IND)	11	11	11
Jules Snagg (SVG)	1	6	3
Issa Kamara (SLE)	0	5	7
Paul Coll (NZL)	11	11	11
Joel Makin (WAL)	11	11	11
Alexander Arjoon (GUY)	9	8	5
Mwinga Lengwe (ZAM)	7	4	3
14	Steven Finitsis (AUS)	11	11	11
12	Campbell Grayson (NZL)	11	11	11
Q*	Hartaj Bains (KEN)	0	4	1
Q*	Michael Kawooya (UGA)	4	4	11	11	4
Micah Franklin (BER)	11	11	9	8	11
Joe Chapman (IVB)	11	11	11
James Fayia (SLE)	4	2	2
Kelvin Ndhlovu (ZAM)	11	11	9	11
8	Ong Beng Hee (MAS)	7	2	11	5

Second round
4	Saurav Ghosal (IND)	11	11	11
Paul Coll (NZL)	4	4	7
Joel Makin (WAL)	5	6	6
14	Steven Finitsis (AUS)	11	11	11
12	Campbell Grayson (NZL)	11	11	11
Micah Franklin (BER)	1	1	4
Joe Chapman (IVB)	6	12	0	10
Kelvin Ndhlovu (ZAM)	11	10	11	12

Third round
4	Saurav Ghosal (IND)	2	5	11	11	11
14	Steven Finitsis (AUS)	11	11	4	6	8
12	Campbell Grayson (NZL)	11	11	11
Kelvin Ndhlovu (ZAM)	4	6	4

Quarter finals
4	Saurav Ghosal (IND)	8	7	11	11	11
12	Campbell Grayson (NZL)	11	11	6	8	6

===== Section 2 =====
First round
6	Alister Walker (BOT)	11	11	11
Dilshan Gunawardena (SRI)	5	4	2
Christian Navas (GIB)	2	5	3
Cameron Stafford (CAY)	11	11	11
Bradley Hindle (MLT)	11	14	11
Scott Fitzgerald (WAL)	5	12	9
Ridvan Prosper (SEY)	0	3	1
15	Ivan Yuen (MAS)	11	11	11
13	Martin Knight (NZL)	11	11	11
Gihan Suwaris (SRI)	0	6	3
Scott Gautier (JER)	4	3	4
Kevin Moran (SCO)	11	11	11
Anthony Brindle (GIB)	11	11	11
Madako Junior Suari (PNG)	5	4	9
Nicholas Kyme (BER)	4	3	4
2	James Willstrop (ENG)	11	11	11

Second round
6	Alister Walker (BOT)	11	11	11
Cameron Stafford (CAY)	3	4	5
Bradley Hindle (MLT)	11	8	7	8
15	Ivan Yuen (MAS)	9	11	11	11
13	Martin Knight (NZL)	11	11	9	11
Kevin Moran (SCO)	4	3	11	6
Anthony Brindle (GIB)	6	5	4
2	James Willstrop (ENG)	11	11	11

Third round
6	Alister Walker (BOT)	8	11	2	8
15	Ivan Yuen (MAS)	11	9	11	11
13	Martin Knight (NZL)	5	5	5
2	James Willstrop (ENG)	11	11	11

Quarter finals
15	Ivan Yuen (MAS)	1	7	3
2	James Willstrop (ENG)	11	11	11

== Plate ==
First round
Xavier Koenig (MRI)	11	11	11
Ntholeng Lechesa (LES)	0	1	0
Kevin Hannaway (SVG)	5	6	8
Michael Craig (NIR)	11	11	11
Julian Jervis (CAY)	6	3	3
Ravindu Laksiri (SRI)	11	11	11
Kenneth Maina (KEN)	11	11	11
Moreina Wei (PNG)	2	0	1
Manda Chilambwe (ZAM)	6	8	11	8
Hardeep Reel (KEN)	11	11	5	11
Robert Maycock (BER)	11	11	11
Ian Rukunya (UGA)	2	5	5
Kale Wilson (TTO)	8	11	9	11	11
Daniel Zammit-Lewis (MLT)	11	7	11	6	9
Bruce Burrowes (JAM)	11	11	12
Q	Othneil Bailey (SVG)	6	4	10
Q	Michael Kawooya (UGA)	11	11	11
Mark Tewkesbury (GIB)	2	5	3
James Fayia (SLE)	0	0	0	w/o	w/o
Hartaj Bains (KEN)	11	11	11
Alexander Arjoon (GUY)	9	8	6
Mwinga Lengwe (ZAM)	11	11	11
Issa Kamara (SLE)	w/o	w/o	w/o	w/o	w/o
Jules Snagg (SVG)
Scott Fitzgerald (WAL)	11	11	11
Ridvan Prosper (SEY)	2	3	2
Christian Navas (GIB)	8	4	2
Dilshan Gunawardena (SRI)	11	11	11
Scott Gautier (JER)	11	12	11
Gihan Suwaris (SRI)	5	10	7
Suari Madoko Jr. Suari (PNG)	6	4	7
Nicholas Kyme (BER)	11	11	11

Second round
Xavier Koenig (MRI)
Michael Craig (NIR)	w/o	w/o	w/o	w/o	w/o
Ravindu Laksiri (SRI)	11	11	3	11
Kenneth Maina (KEN)	8	9	11	9
Hardeep Reel (KEN)	11	7	11	11
Robert Maycock (BER)	9	11	8	9
Kale Wilson (TTO)	9	11	6	11	11
Bruce Burrowes (JAM)	11	5	11	6	6
Michael Kawooya (UGA)	5	4	11	12	7
Hartaj Bains (KEN)	11	11	9	10	11
Mwinga Lengwe (ZAM)	11	11	11
Jules Snagg (SVG)	9	6	7
Scott Fitzgerald (WAL)	11	11	14
Dilshan Gunawardena (SRI)	2	5	12
Scott Gautier (JER)	8	4	4
Nicholas Kyme (BER)	11	11	11

Quarterfinals
Xavier Koenig (MRI)	4	1	4
Ravindu Laksiri (SRI)	11	11	11
Hardeep Reel (KEN)	12	10	8	11	11
Kale Wilson (TTO)	10	12	11	9	1
Hartaj Bains (KEN)	11	5	11	5
Mwinga Lengwe (ZAM)	6	11	13	11
Scott Fitzgerald (WAL)	11	11	11
Nicholas Kyme (BER)	6	5	9

Semifinals
Ravindu Laksiri (SRI)	8	11	11	4	10
Hardeep Reel (KEN)	11	9	9	11	12
Mwinga Lengwe (ZAM)	6	3	11	5
Scott Fitzgerald (WAL)	11	11	5	11

Final
Hardeep Reel (KEN)	3	7	5
Scott Fitzgerald (WAL)	11	11	11

=== Classic ===
First round
Mahesh Mangaonkar (IND)	11	11	11
Peter Creed (WAL)	7	6	6
Sunil Seth (GUY)	11	11	4	6	0
Nick Taylor (JER)	9	4	11	11	11
Kevin Moran (SCO)	11	11	11
Anthony Brindle (GIB)	4	8	9

Quarterfinals
Christopher Binnie (JAM)	12	4	7	7
Shawn Delierre (CAN)	10	11	11	11
Mahesh Mangaonkar (IND)	11	11	11
Nick Taylor (JER)	5	3	7
Micah Franklin (BER)	5	9	11	7
Joe Chapman (IVB)	11	11	6	11
Cameron Stafford (CAY)	13	5	11	5	14
Kevin Moran (SCO)	11	11	8	11	16

Semifinals
Shawn Delierre (CAN)	11	11	7	11
Mahesh Mangaonkar (IND)	6	4	11	8
Joe Chapman (IVB)	11	8	6	9
Kevin Moran (SCO)	8	11	11	11

Final
Shawn Delierre (CAN)	11	11	2	11
Kevin Moran (SCO)	9	9	11	8

=== Consolation ===
First round
Ntholeng Lechesa (LES)	1	0	0
Kevin Hannaway (SVG)	11	11	11
Julian Jervis (CAY)	11	11	11
Moreina Wei (PNG)	2	4	1
Manda Chilambwe (ZAM)
Ian Rukunya (UGA)	w/o	w/o	w/o	w/o	w/o
Mark Tewkesbury (GIB)	11	11	11
Schubert Maketu (PNG)	3	6	4
Alexander Arjoon (GUY)
Issa Kamara (SLE)	w/o	w/o	w/o	w/o	w/o
Ridvan Prosper (SEY)	2	4	2
Christian Navas (GIB)	11	11	11
Gihan Suwaris (SRI)	11	6	12	11
Suari Madoko Jr. Suari (PNG)	7	11	10	7

Quarterfinals
Kevin Hannaway (SVG)	1	12	5
Julian Jervis (CAY)	11	14	11
Manda Chilambwe (ZAM)	11	11	11
Daniel Murphy (CAY)	9	5	6
Mark Tewkesbury (GIB)	9	9	1
Alexander Arjoon (GUY)	11	11	11
Christian Navas (GIB)	11	11	1	4	7
Gihan Suwaris (SRI)	8	7	11	11	11

Semifinals
Julian Jervis (CAY)	8	11	6	6
Manda Chilambwe (ZAM)	11	8	11	11
Alexander Arjoon (GUY)	8	11	8	11	11
Gihan Suwaris (SRI)	11	6	11	3	2

Final
Manda Chilambwe (ZAM)	5	11	11	11
Alexander Arjoon (GUY)	11	6	9	8

== Qualification ==
Qualification
Bruce Burrowes (JAM)
X	bye	X	X	X	X	X
Othneil Bailey (SVG)	11	11	11
Schubert Maketu (PNG)	4	2	5

First round
Bruce Burrowes (JAM)	11	11	12
Q	Othneil Bailey (SVG)	6	4	10

Qualification
Michael Kawooya (UGA)	11	11	11
Daniel Murphy (CAY)	2	5	2
X	bye	X	X	X	X	X
Mark Tewkesbury (GIB)

First round
Q	Michael Kawooya (UGA)	11	11	11
Mark Tewkesbury (GIB)	2	5	3

=== Plate ===
Qualification
Nick Taylor (JER)
X	bye	X	X	X	X	X
Mark Tewkesbury (GIB)	4	11	11	6	2
Othneil Bailey (SVG)	11	8	7	11	11

First round
Nick Taylor (JER)	11	11	11
Q	Othneil Bailey (SVG)	6	6	7

Qualification
12	Campbell Grayson (NZL)
X	bye	X	X	X	X	X
Daniel Murphy (CAY)	7	4	6
Hartaj Bains (KEN)	11	11	11

First round
12	Campbell Grayson (NZL)	11	11	11
Q	Hartaj Bains (KEN)	0	4	1

Qualification
Michael Kawooya (UGA)	11	11	11
Schubert Maketu (PNG)	1	5	5
Micah Franklin (BER)
X	bye	X	X	X	X	X

First round
Q	Michael Kawooya (UGA)	4	4	11	11	4
Micah Franklin (BER)	11	11	9	8	11
