= Squash at the 2018 Commonwealth Games – Men's singles =

Men's singles Squash at the 2018 Commonwealth Games
- Venue: Oxenford Studios
- Dates: 5 – 9 April 2018
- Competitors: 54

Medalists
gold medal	James Willstrop	England
silver medal	Paul Coll	New Zealand
bronze medal	Nafiizwan Adnan	Malaysia

The Men's singles Squash event of the 2018 Commonwealth Games was held at the Oxenford Studios, Gold Coast. Singles play took place between 5 and 9 April. Englishman James Willstrop won gold after beating Paul Coll of New Zealand in straight games, 11-9, 11-4, 11-6.

== Medallists ==
Gold	James Willstrop; England
Silver	Paul Coll; New Zealand
Bronze	Nafiizwan Adnan; Malaysia

== Seeds ==
1. Nick Matthew (ENG) (quarterfinals)
2. Paul Coll (NZL) (silver medal)
3. Saurav Ghosal (IND) (round of 32)
4. James Willstrop (ENG) (gold medal)
5. Daryl Selby (ENG) (quarterfinals)
6. Ryan Cuskelly (AUS) (round of 16)
7. Cameron Pilley (AUS) (quarterfinals)
8. Alan Clyne (SCO) (quarterfinals)
9. Greg Lobban (SCO) (round of 16)
10. Campbell Grayson (NZL) (round of 16)
11. Joel Makin (WAL) (Fourth place)
12. Nafiizwan Adnan (MAS) (bronze medal)
13. Eain Yow Ng (MAS) (round of 64)
14. Harinder Pal Sandhu (IND) (round of 32)
15. Peter Creed (WAL) (round of 64)
16. Vikram Malhotra (IND) (round of 16)

== Draws & Results ==
=== Main draw ===
==== Finals ====
Quarter finals
1	Nick Matthew (ENG)	7	11	10	11	6
12	Nafiizwan Adnan (MAS)	11	6	12	4	11
7	Cameron Pilley (AUS)	11	10	11	6	6
4	James Willstrop (ENG)	7	12	7	11	11
11	Joel Makin (WAL)	11	4	8	11	12
8	Alan Clyne (SCO)	9	11	11	8	10
5	Daryl Selby (ENG)	5	9	11	5
2	Paul Coll (NZL)	11	11	7	11

Semi finals
12	Nafiizwan Adnan (MAS)	6	10	4
4	James Willstrop (ENG)	11	12	11
11	Joel Makin (WAL)	11	11	9	2	8
2	Paul Coll (NZL)	6	9	11	11	11

Final
4	James Willstrop (ENG)	11	11	11
2	Paul Coll (NZL)	9	4	6
Third place
12	Nafiizwan Adnan (MAS)	11	6	9	11	11
11	Joel Makin (WAL)	7	11	11	4	5

==== Top half ====
===== Section 1 =====
Round of 64
Ian Rukunya (UGA)	11	11	11
Stephen Henry (FIJ)	2	3	2
Xavier Koenig (MRI)	11	11	11
Yusif Mansaray (SLE)	3	3	8
16	Vikram Malhotra (IND)	11	11	11
Manda Chilambwe (ZAM)	6	5	2
Evan Williams (NZL)	11	11	13
Jacob Kelly (CAY)	9	5	11
Hardeep Reel (KEN)	14	11	4	6	11
Othneil Bailey (SVG)	12	4	11	11	13

Round of 32
1	Nick Matthew (ENG)	11	11	11
Ian Rukunya (UGA)	2	6	2
Xavier Koenig (MRI)	4	3	0
16	Vikram Malhotra (IND)	11	11	11
12	Mohd Nafi. Adnan (MAS)	7	11	11	11
Evan Williams (NZL)	11	5	8	6
Othneil Bailey (SVG)	2	4	3
6	Ryan Cuskelly (AUS)	11	11	11

Round of 16
1	Nick Matthew (ENG)	11	8	11	11
16	Vikram Malhotra (IND)	6	11	6	6
12	Mohd Nafi. Adnan (MAS)	w/o
6	Ryan Cuskelly (AUS)

Quarter finals
1	Nick Matthew (ENG)	7	11	10	11	6
12	Mohd Nafi. Adnan (MAS)	11	6	12	4	11

===== Section 2 =====
Round of 64
Ernest Jombla (SLE)	13	11	11	6	11
Klaus Pragassen (SEY)	15	4	7	11	9
Kale Wilson (TRI)	11	8	8
Daniel Zammit-Lewis (MLT)	13	11	11
15	Peter Creed (WAL)	11	7	6	9
Lewis Walters (JAM)	7	11	11	11
10	Campbell Grayson (NZL)	11	12	11
Jason-Ray Khalil (GUY)	3	10	2
Kevin Moran (SCO)	11	11	17
Jules Snagg (SVG)	7	8	15
Farhan Zaman (PAK)	11	9	11	11
Joe Chapman (IVB)	6	11	4	6

Round of 32
7	Cameron Pilley (AUS)	11	11	11
Ernest Jombla (SLE)	7	3	2
Daniel Zammit-Lewis (MLT)	7	9	4
Lewis Walters (JAM)	11	11	11
10	Campbell Grayson (NZL)	11	11	11
Kevin Moran (SCO)	9	0	9
Farhan Zaman (PAK)	5	1	7
4	James Willstrop (ENG)	11	11	11

Round of 16
7	Cameron Pilley (AUS)	11	11	11
Lewis Walters (JAM)	3	4	8
10	Campbell Grayson (NZL)	8	11	7	7
4	James Willstrop (ENG)	11	6	11	11

Quarter finals
7	Cameron Pilley (AUS)	11	10	11	6	6
4	James Willstrop (ENG)	7	12	7	11	11

==== Bottom half ====
===== Section 3 =====
Round of 64
Christopher Binnie (JAM)	11	11	11
Jason Doyle (SVG)	5	6	8
Micah Franklin (BER)	11	11	11
James Fayia (SLE)	2	3	1
11	Joel Makin (WAL)	11	11	11
Sailesh Pala (FIJ)	3	3	4
13	Eain Yow Ng (MAS)	11	11	11	9	10
Rex Hedrick (AUS)	13	6	8	11	12
Sunny Seth (GUY)	11	11	8	11
Shawn Simpson (BAR)	8	8	11	4
Tayyab Aslam (PAK)	11	11	11
Neville Sorrentino (IVB)	3	4	4

Round of 32
3	Saurav Ghosal (IND)	11	11	8	9	10
Christopher Binnie (JAM)	5	7	11	11	12
Micah Franklin (BER)	6	3	3
11	Joel Makin (WAL)	11	11	11
Rex Hedrick (AUS)	11	11	11
Sunny Seth (GUY)	4	2	3
Tayyab Aslam (PAK)	6	7	11	7
8	Alan Clyne (SCO)	11	11	9	11

Round of 16
Christopher Binnie (JAM)	4	5	2
11	Joel Makin (WAL)	11	11	11
Rex Hedrick (AUS)	7	3	7
8	Alan Clyne (SCO)	11	11	11

Quarter finals
11	Joel Makin (WAL)	11	4	8	11	12
8	Alan Clyne (SCO)	9	11	11	8	10

===== Section 4 =====
Round of 64
Madako Junior Suari (PNG)	10	3	6
Michael Kawooya (UGA)	12	11	11
Ravindu Laksiri (SRI)	11	11	11
Romit Parshottam (FIJ)	2	2	5
14	Harinder Pal Sandhu (IND)	11	11	11	11
Cameron Stafford (CAY)	3	13	6	8
Ivan Yuen (MAS)	11	11	11
Mandela Patrick (TRI)	4	2	6
Christian Navas (GIB)	4	0	3
Kelvin Ndhlovu (ZAM)	11	11	11

Round of 32
5	Daryl Selby (ENG)	11	11	11
Michael Kawooya (UGA)	4	5	7
Ravindu Laksiri (SRI)	8	8	6
9	Greg Lobban (SCO)	11	11	11
14	Harinder Pal Sandhu (IND)	8	6	1
Ivan Yuen (MAS)	11	11	11
Kelvin Ndhlovu (ZAM)	5	7	2
2	Paul Coll (NZL)	11	11	11

Round of 16
5	Daryl Selby (ENG)	11	11	6	11
9	Greg Lobban (SCO)	6	2	11	7
Ivan Yuen (MAS)	5	6	4
2	Paul Coll (NZL)	11	11	11

Quarter finals
5	Daryl Selby (ENG)	5	9	11	5
2	Paul Coll (NZL)	11	11	7	11
