= Squash at the 2010 Commonwealth Games – Men's singles =

The Squash at the 2010 Commonwealth Games was held at the Siri Fort Sports Complex, New Delhi. Singles play took place from 4 October.

Nick Matthew defeated James Willstrop 11–6, 11–7, 11–7 in 66 minutes to win the gold medal.

== Medalists ==
Gold	Nick Matthew; England
Silver	James Willstrop; England
Bronze	Peter Barker; England

== Seeds ==
1. (England) Nick Matthew (champion)
2. (England) James Willstrop (final)
3. (England) Peter Barker (semifinals)
4. (England) Daryl Selby (quarterfinals)
5. (Australia) David Palmer (quarterfinals)
6. (Malaysia) Mohd Azlan Iskandar (semifinals)
7. (Australia) Cameron Pilley (quarterfinals)
8. (Australia) Stewart Boswell (quarterfinals)
9. (Malaysia) Ong Beng Hee (third round)
10. (Pakistan) Aamir Atlas Khan (third round)
11. (India) Saurav Ghosal (third round)
12. (Canada) Shahier Razik (first round, withdrew due to injury)
13. (Pakistan) Farhan Mehboob (third round)
14. (Australia) Ryan Cuskelly (third round)
15. (New Zealand) Martin Knight (second round)
16. (New Zealand) Campbell Grayson (third round)

== Draws and results ==
=== Finals ===
Quarter-finals
1	(England) N Matthew	11	11	11
7	(Australia) C Pilley	7	5	6
3	(England) P Barker	10	11	11	11
8	(Australia) S Boswell	12	9	3	3
6	(Malaysia) M A Iskandar	11	7	13	13
4	(England) D Selby	6	11	11	11
5	(Australia) D Palmer	11	11	5	8	5
2	(England) J Willstrop	9	8	11	11	11

Semi-finals
1	(England) N Matthew	11	11	11
3	(England) P Barker	9	2	9
6	(Malaysia) M A Iskandar	4	7	5
2	(England) J Willstrop	11	11	11

Final
1	(England) N Matthew	11	11	11
2	(England) J Willstrop	6	7	7
Third place
3	(England) P Barker	11	11	11
6	(Malaysia) M A Iskandar	5	4	2

=== Top half ===
==== Section 1 ====
First round
(Malaysia) M N Adnan	11	11	11
(Kenya) H Bains	8	2	5
(Pakistan) A A Khan	11	11	11
(Bangladesh) M M Rana	2	2	6
(Trinidad and Tobago) C Ramasra	11	11	11
(Saint Vincent and the Grenadines) J Snagg	5	3	0
7	(Australia) C Pilley	11	11	11
(British Virgin Islands) J Chapman	5	9	0
(India) S Suchde	11	11	11
(Jersey) M Hopkins	6	5	4
14	(Australia) R Cuskelly	11	11	11
(India) S Jangra	7	9	4
(Malta) B Hindle	11	11	11
(Sri Lanka) N Samarasinghe	1	5	3

Second round
1	(England) N Matthew	11	13	6	11
(Malaysia) M N Adnan	6	11	11	3
(Pakistan) A A Khan	11	11	11
(Trinidad and Tobago) C Ramasra	2	4	2
7	(Australia) C Pilley	11	9	11	11
(India) S Suchde	8	11	6	7
14	(Australia) R Cuskelly	11	11	6	11
(Malta) B Hindle	8	8	11	6

Third round
1	(England) N Matthew	10	11	11	11
(Pakistan) A A Khan	12	3	5	5
7	(Australia) C Pilley	11	11	11
14	(Australia) R Cuskelly	6	7	8

Quarter-finals
1	(England) N Matthew	11	11	11
7	(Australia) C Pilley	7	5	6

==== Section 2 ====
First round
3	(England) P Barker	11	11	11
(Zambia) K Ndhlovu	2	1	1
(Scotland) A Clyne	11	11	11
(Bermuda) N Kyme	4	0	2
11	(India) S Ghosal	11	11	11
(Uganda) I Rukunya	1	4	0
(Zambia) P Chifunda
(Scotland) L Paterson	w/o
8	(Australia) S Boswell	11	11	11
(Scotland) C Small	7	6	4
(India) H P Sandhu	11	11	11
(Bangladesh) M S Pervez	3	1	2
13	(Pakistan) F Mehboob	11	11	11
(Uganda) S Kyagulanyl	3	4	8
(Pakistan) Y Butt	w/o
(Jamaica) C Binnie

Second round
3	(England) P Barker	11	11	11
(Scotland) A Clyne	4	2	3
11	(India) S Ghosal	11	11	11
(Scotland) L Paterson	6	6	7
8	(Australia) S Boswell	11	11	11
(India) M P Sandhu	4	7	5
13	(Pakistan) F Mehboob	11	11	11
(Pakistan) Y Butt	4	3	1

Third round
3	(England) P Barker	11	11	11	11
11	(India) S Ghosal	5	9	13	0
8	(Australia) S Boswell	11	11	11
13	(Pakistan) F Mehboob	9	6	8

Quarter-finals
3	(England) P Barker	10	11	11	11
8	(Australia) S Boswell	12	9	3	3

=== Bottom half ===
==== Section 1 ====
First round
(Scotland) H Leitch	11	11	8	11
(Botswana) L Ragontse	6	2	11	8
16	(New Zealand) C Grayson	11	11	11
(Zimbabwe) R Simbule	9	6	2
(Canada) R Clarke	11	11	11
(Saint Vincent and the Grenadines) O Bailey	9	6	3
6	(Malaysia) M A Iskandar	11	11	11
(Saint Vincent and the Grenadines) J Bentick	7	3	0
(Guernsey) Chris Simpson	11	11	11
(Malawi) A Taulo	4	3	1
15	(New Zealand) M Knight	11	11	11
(Kenya) H Reel	3	2	5
(Pakistan) D A Khan	11	11	11
(Jamaica) B Burrowes	1	5	2
4	(England) D Selby	11	11	11
(Papua New Guinea) M Rucklinger	2	1	2

Second round
(Scotland) H Leitch	4	5	3
16	(New Zealand) C Grayson	11	11	11
(Canada) R Clarke	11	4	3	4
6	(Malaysia) M A Iskandar	8	11	11	11
(Guernsey) C Simpson	11	11	12	11
15	(New Zealand) M Knight	8	4	14	3
(Pakistan) D A Khan	5	4	3
4	(England) D Selby	11	11	11

Third round
16	(New Zealand) C Grayson	8	1	3
6	(Malaysia) M A Iskandar	11	11	11
(Guernsey) C Simpson	9	5	5
4	(England) D Selby	11	11	11

Quarter-finals
6	(Malaysia) M A Iskandar	11	7	13	13
4	(England) D Selby	6	11	11	11

==== Section 2 ====
First round
(Barbados) S Simpson
(Botswana) L Mosope	w/o
(Zambia) L Chiluyfya	6	3	8
9	(Malaysia) Ong B H	11	11	11
(Uganda) B Okumu	1	4	4
(Canada) A McDougall	11	11	11
(Malawi) J Taulo	1	2	3
5	(Australia) D Palmer	11	11	11
(Canada) S Delierre	11	11	11
(Guernsey) H Birch	4	9	7
(Uganda) M Kawooya
12	(Canada) S Razik	w/o
(Malaysia) I Yuen	11	11	11
(Malawi) J Matewere	6	0	2

Second round
(Botswana) L Mosope	7	6	3
9	(Malaysia) Ong B H	11	11	11
(Canada) A McDougall	3	5	6
5	(Australia) D Palmer	11	11	11
(Canada) S Delierre	11	11	11
(Uganda) M Kawooya	5	7	7
(Malaysia) I Yuen	7	4	4
2	(England) J Willstrop	11	11	11

Third round
9	(Malaysia) Ong B H	4	13	5
5	(Australia) D Palmer	11	15	11
(Canada) S Delierre	7	4	12	2
2	(England) J Willstrop	11	11	10	11

Quarter-finals
5	(Australia) D Palmer	11	11	5	8	5
2	(England) J Willstrop	9	8	11	11	11
