= Gibraltar at the 2014 Commonwealth Games =

- CG code: GIB
- CGA: Commonwealth Games Association of Gibraltar

in Glasgow, Scotland
- Competitors: 27 in 7 sports
- Flag bearer: Chris Walker
- Medals: Gold 0 Silver 0 Bronze 0 Total 0

Commonwealth Games appearances (overview)
- 1958; 1962; 1966; 1970; 1974; 1978; 1982; 1986; 1990; 1994; 1998; 2002; 2006; 2010; 2014; 2018; 2022; 2026; 2030

Gibraltar competed in the 2014 Commonwealth Games in Glasgow, Scotland from 23 July to 3 August 2014.

== Athletics ==
Men
Track & road events

Athlete	Event	Heat		Semifinal		Final	
Athlete	Event	Result	Rank	Result	Rank	Result	Rank
Jerai Torres	100 m	11.54	69	did not advance			
Jerai Torres	200 m	22.95	66	did not advance			
Harvey Dixon	1500 m	3:44.67	18	—N/a		did not advance	

Women
Track & road events

Athlete	Event	Final	
Athlete	Event	Result	Rank
Emma Montiel	10000 m	37:26.85	13
Alison Edwards	Marathon	DNF	

Key

- Note–Ranks given for track events are within the athlete's heat only
- Q = Qualified for the next round
- q = Qualified for the next round as a fastest loser or, in field events, by position without achieving the qualifying target
- NR = National record
- N/A = Round not applicable for the event

== Cycling ==
=== Road ===
Men

Athlete	Event	Time	Rank
Julian Bellido	Time trial	58:49.28	35
Lee Calderon	Time trial	58:48.36	33
Mark Francis	Time trial	1:00:07.38	43

== Shooting ==
Men

Athlete	Event	Qualification		Semifinals		Final	
Athlete	Event	Points	Rank	Points	Rank	Points	Rank
Albert Buhagiar	50 metre rifle prone	603.8	27	—N/a		did not advance	
Wayne Piri	50 metre rifle prone	615.3	14	—N/a		did not advance	
Louis Baglietto	10 metre air pistol	546	23	—N/a		did not advance	
Jonathan Patron	10 metre air pistol	552	20	—N/a		did not advance	
Gary Cooper	Trap	97	25	did not advance			
Kevin Cowles	Trap	98	24	did not advance			

Women

Athlete	Event	Qualification		Final	
Athlete	Event	Points	Rank	Points	Rank
Stephanie Piri	10 metre air rifle	394.4	24	did not advance	
Natalie Piri	50 metre rifle prone	—N/a		599.5	21

== Squash ==
Individual

Athlete	Event	Round of 128	Round of 64	Round of 32	Round of 16	Quarterfinals	Semifinals	Final	Rank
Athlete	Event	Opposition Score	Opposition Score	Opposition Score	Opposition Score	Opposition Score	Opposition Score	Opposition Score	Rank
Anthony Brindle	Men's Singles	Bye	M Suari (PNG); W 3-0	J Willstrop (ENG); L 0-3	did not advance				
Christian Navas	Men's Singles	Bye	C Stafford (CAY); L 0-3	did not advance					
Mark Tewkesbury	Men's Singles	O Bailey (SVG); L 2-3	did not advance						

Doubles

Athlete	Event	Group Stage				Round of 16	Quarterfinal	Semifinal	Final	Rank
Athlete	Event	Opposition Score	Opposition Score	Opposition Score	Rank	Opposition Score	Opposition Score	Opposition Score	Opposition Score	Rank
Anthony Brindle; Christian Navas	Men's doubles	England; L 0 - 2	Saint Vincent and the Grenadines; L 1 - 2	Zambia; L 0 - 2	4	did not advance				

== Swimming ==
Men

Athlete	Event	Heat		Semifinal		Final	
Athlete	Event	Time	Rank	Time	Rank	Time	Rank
James Sanderson	50 m freestyle	25.33	43	did not advance			
James Sanderson	100 m freestyle	54.61	37	did not advance			
Colin Bensadon	200 m freestyle	2:00.89	29	—N/a		did not advance	
Jordan Gonzalez	50 m backstroke	29.83	27	did not advance			
Jordan Gonzalez	100 m backstroke	1:04.50	30	did not advance			
Colin Bensadon	50 m breaststroke	31.90	29	did not advance			
Colin Bensadon	100 m breaststroke	1:11.55	29	did not advance			
Colin Bensadon	200 m breaststroke	2:35.61	18	—N/a		did not advance	
James Sanderson	50 m butterfly	27.10	32	did not advance			
James Sanderson	100 m butterfly	1:00.65	27	did not advance			
Colin Bensadon	200 m individual medley	2:13.74	18	—N/a		did not advance	
Colin Bensadon; Colin Gonzalez; Karl Pardo; James Sanderson	4 × 100 m medley relay	4:14.86	14	—N/a		did not advance	

Women

Athlete	Event	Heat		Semifinal		Final	
Athlete	Event	Time	Rank	Time	Rank	Time	Rank
Christina Linares	50 m freestyle	29.05	43	did not advance			
Christina Linares	100 m freestyle	1:03.50	37	did not advance			

== Triathlon ==
Individual

Athlete	Event	Swim (1.5 km)	Trans 1	Bike (40 km)	Trans 2	Run (10 km)	Total Time	Rank
Andrew Gordon	Men's	22:38	0:46	Lapped				
Richard Muscat	Men's	24:14	0:49	Lapped				
Christopher Walker	Men's	21:22	0:41	1:07:17	0:28	40:57	2:10:45	26
