= Squash at the 2014 Commonwealth Games =

- Venue: Scotstoun Sports Campus
- Location: Glasgow, Scotland
- Dates: 24 July to 3 August 2014
- Competitors: 119 from 28 nations

Squash at the 2014 Commonwealth Games was the fifth appearance of the Squash at the Commonwealth Games. The squash events at the 2014 Commonwealth Games were held at the Scotstoun Sports Campus in Glasgow, Scotland, from 24 July to 3 August 2014.

== Schedule ==
All times are British Summer Time (UTC+1)

P	Preliminaries	1/8	Round of 16	1/4	Quarterfinals	1/2	Semifinals	B	Bronze medal match	F	Final

Date →	Thu 24			Fri 25			Sat 26		Sun 27		Mon 28		Tue 29			Wed 30			Thu 31			Fri 1			Sat 2		Sun 3	
Event ↓	M	A	E	M	A	E	A	E	A	E	M	A	M	A	E	M	A	E	M	A	E	M	A	E	M	A	M	A
Men's singles	P			1/8			1/4		1/2		B	F																
Men's doubles													P						1/8			1/4			1/2		B	F
Women's singles	P			1/8			1/4		1/2		B	F																
Women's doubles													P						1/4			1/2			B	F		
Mixed doubles													P							1/8		1/4			1/2		B	F

M = Morning session, A = Afternoon session, E = Evening session

== Medal table ==
Rank	Nation	Gold	Silver	Bronze	Total
1	Australia	2	0	1	3
2	England	1	5	3	9
3	India	1	0	0	1
3	Malaysia	1	0	0	1
5	New Zealand	0	0	1	1
Totals (5 entries)		5	5	5	15

== Medallists ==
Event	Gold	Silver	Bronze
Men's singles	Nick Matthew; England	James Willstrop; England	Peter Barker; England
Women's singles	Nicol David; Malaysia	Laura Massaro; England	Joelle King; New Zealand
Men's doubles	Cameron Pilley and David Palmer; Australia	Nick Matthew and Adrian Grant; England	James Willstrop and Daryl Selby; England
Women's doubles	Dipika Pallikal and Joshna Chinappa; India	Laura Massaro and Jenny Duncalf; England	Alison Waters and Emma Beddoes; England
Mixed doubles	Rachael Grinham and David Palmer; Australia	Alison Waters and Peter Barker; England	Kasey Brown and Cameron Pilley; Australia

== Participating nations ==
A total of 119 players from 28 nations will compete in squash at the 2014 Commonwealth Games :

- Australia (10)
- Bermuda (3)
- Botswana (1)
- British Virgin Islands (1)
- Canada (2)
- Cayman Islands (4)
- England (10)
- Gibraltar (3)
- Guernsey (1)
- Guyana (3)
- India (6)
- Jamaica (2)
- Jersey (3)
- Kenya (6)
- Lesotho (1)
- Malaysia (9)
- Malta (4)
- Mauritius (2)
- Norfolk Island (2)
- Northern Ireland (2)
- New Zealand (8)
- Papua New Guinea (8)
- Seychelles (2)
- Saint Vincent and the Grenadines (5)
- Scotland (6)
- Sri Lanka (6)
- Trinidad and Tobago (4)
- Uganda (4)
- Zambia (5)
