= Guyana at the 2014 Commonwealth Games =

- CGF code: GUY
- CGA: Guyana Olympic Association

in Glasgow, Scotland
- Competitors: 28 in 7 sports
- Flag bearer: Geron Williams
- Medals: Gold 0 Silver 0 Bronze 0 Total 0

Commonwealth Games appearances (overview)
- 1930; 1934; 1938; 1950; 1954; 1958; 1962; 1966; 1970; 1974; 1978; 1982; 1986; 1990; 1994; 1998; 2002; 2006; 2010; 2014; 2018; 2022; 2026; 2030

Guyana competed in the 2014 Commonwealth Games in Glasgow, Scotland, from July 23 to August 3, 2014.

== Athletics ==
Men
Track & road events

Athlete	Event	Heat		Semifinal		Final	
Athlete	Event	Result	Rank	Result	Rank	Result	Rank
Jeremy Bascom	100 m	10.58	34	did not advance			
Adam Harris	100 m	10.45	24 Q	10.23	13	did not advance	
Adam Harris	200 m	21.19	34	did not advance			
Winston George	200 m	20.88	18 Q	20.88	17	did not advance	
Winston George	400 m	46.25	12 Q	46.38	15	did not advance	
Stephan James	200 m	21.08	29	did not advance			
Stephan James	400 m	46.39	17 Q	46.35	14	did not advance	
Jeremy Bascom; Winston George; Adam Harris; Stephan James	4x100 m relay	DSQ		—N/a		did not advance	

Key

- Note–Ranks given for track events are within the athlete's heat only
- Q = Qualified for the next round
- q = Qualified for the next round as a fastest loser or, in field events, by position without achieving the qualifying target
- NR = National record
- N/A = Round not applicable for the event

== Boxing ==
Men

Athlete	Event	Round of 32	Round of 16	Quarterfinals	Semifinals	Final	
Athlete	Event	Opposition Result	Opposition Result	Opposition Result	Opposition Result	Opposition Result	Rank
Imran Khan	Bantamweight	Njangiru (KEN); L 0 - 3	did not advance				
Eon Bancroft	Welterweight	Bye	Don (SRI); W 2 - 1	Mbenge (RSA); L 0 - 3	did not advance		
Dennis Thomas	Middleweight	Keama (PNG); W 3 - 0	Coyle (NIR); L 1 - 2	did not advance			

Women

Athlete	Event	Round of 16	Quarterfinals	Semifinals	Final	Rank
Athlete	Event	Opposition Result	Opposition Result	Opposition Result	Opposition Result	Rank
Theresa London	Middleweight	Price (WAL); L 0 - 3	did not advance			

== Cycling ==
=== Road ===
Men

Athlete	Event	Time	Rank
Alanzo Greaves	Road race	DNF	
Raynauth Jeffrey	Road race	DNF	
Raynauth Jeffrey	Time trial	58:27.76	30
Scott Savory	Road race	DNF	
Geron Williams	Road race	DNF	
Marlon Williams	Road race	DNF	
Marlon Williams	Time trial	59:19.97	38

Women

Athlete	Event	Time	Rank
Claire Fraser-Green	Road race	DNF	
Claire Fraser-Green	Time trial	53:02.61	29

=== Track ===
Points Race

Athlete	Event	Qualification			Final		
Athlete	Event	Laps	Points	Rank	Laps	Points	Rank
Scott Savory	Men's points race	DNF			did not advance		
Geron Williams	Men's points race	-1	-20	17	did not advance		

Scratch

Athlete	Event	Qualification		Final	
Athlete	Event	Time	Rank	Time	Rank
Scott Savory	Men's scratch	DNF		did not advance	
Geron Williams	Men's scratch	DNF		did not advance	

== Shooting ==
Open

Athlete	Event	Day 1		Day 2		Day 3		Total	
Athlete	Event	Points	Rank	Points	Rank	Points	Rank	Overall	Rank
Lennox Braithwaite	Queen's prize individual	103		148		134		385	15
Mahendra Presaud	Queen's prize individual	102		146		128		376	23
Lennox Braithwaite; Mahendra Presaud	Queen's prize pairs	296	9	289	4	—N/a		585	6

== Squash ==
Individual

Athlete	Event	Round of 128	Round of 64	Round of 32	Round of 16	Quarterfinals	Semifinals	Final	Rank
Athlete	Event	Opposition Score	Opposition Score	Opposition Score	Opposition Score	Opposition Score	Opposition Score	Opposition Score	Rank
Alexander Arjoon	Men's Singles	Bye	J Makin (WAL); L 0-3	did not advance					
Sunil Seth	Men's Singles	Bye	D Zamit-Lewis (MLT); W 3-0	C Pilley (AUS); L 0-3	did not advance				
Nicolette Fernandes	Women's Singles	—N/a	Bye	N Muchaile (ZAM); W 3-0	L Massaro (ENG); L 1-3	did not advance			

Doubles

Athlete	Event	Group Stage				Round of 16	Quarterfinal	Semifinal	Final	Rank
Athlete	Event	Opposition Score	Opposition Score	Opposition Score	Rank	Opposition Score	Opposition Score	Opposition Score	Opposition Score	Rank
Alexander Arjoon; Sunil Seth	Men's doubles	Papua New Guinea; W 2 - 0	England; L 0 - 2	Malta; L 0 - 2	3	did not advance				
Nicolette Fernandes; Alexander Arjoon	Mixed doubles	Australia; L 0 - 2	Malaysia; L 0 - 2	—N/a	3	did not advance				

== Swimming ==
Women

Athlete	Event	Heat		Semifinal		Final	
Athlete	Event	Time	Rank	Time	Rank	Time	Rank
Onika George	50 m freestyle	29.55	53	did not advance			
Onika George	100 m freestyle	1:07.02	43	did not advance			
Onika George	50 m backstroke	34.64	34	did not advance			

== Table Tennis ==
Singles

Athlete	Event	Group Stage			Round of 64	Round of 32	Round of 16	Quarterfinals	Semifinals	Final	Rank
Athlete	Event	Opposition Result	Opposition Result	Rank	Opposition Result	Opposition Result	Opposition Result	Opposition Result	Opposition Result	Opposition Result	Rank
Paul David	Men's Singles	Loi (PNG); W 4 - 0	Shing (VAN); W 4 - 3	1 Q	Townsend (AUS); L 0 - 4	did not advance					
Christopher Franklin	Men's Singles	Gascoyne (JER); W 4 - 1	Ibrahim (MAS); L 0 - 4	2	did not advance						
Idi Lewis	Men's Singles	Deshappriya (SRI); L 1 - 4	Cordue (NZL); L 1 - 4	3	did not advance						
Natalie Cummings	Women's Singles	Shah (KEN); W 4 - 0	Carey (WAL); L 0 - 4	2	did not advance						
Chelsea Edghill	Women's Singles	Rebatenne (BOT); W 4 - 0	Kwabi (GHA); W 4 - 0	1 Q	Phillips (WAL); L 3 - 4	did not advance					
Trenace Lowe	Women's Singles	Piumila (SRI); W 4 - 0	Nimal (MDV); W 4 - 1	1 Q	Givan (NIR); L 0 - 4	did not advance					

Doubles

Athlete	Event	Round of 128	Round of 64	Round of 32	Round of 16	Quarterfinals	Semifinals	Final	Rank
Athlete	Event	Opposition Result	Opposition Result	Opposition Result	Opposition Result	Opposition Result	Opposition Result	Opposition Result	Rank
Shamar Britton; Christopher Franklin	Men's Doubles	—N/a	Mauritius; L 2 - 3	did not advance					
Paul David; Idi Lewis	Men's Doubles	—N/a	Bangladesh; W 3 - 0	Trinidad and Tobago; L 2 - 3	did not advance				
Jody-Ann Blake; Natalie Cummings	Women's Doubles	—N/a	Bye	England; L w/o	did not advance				
Chelsea Edghill; Trenace Lowe	Women's Doubles	—N/a	Bye	Sri Lanka; L 2 - 3	did not advance				
Shamar Britton; Natalie Cummings	Mixed Doubles	Barbados; L 0 - 3	did not advance						
Paul David; Trenace Lowe	Mixed Doubles	Northern Ireland; W 3 - 2	New Zealand; W 3 - 2	Singapore; L 0 - 3	did not advance				
Idi Lewis; Jody-Ann Blake	Mixed Doubles	Botswana; L w/o	did not advance						
Christopher Franklin; Chelsea Edghill	Mixed Doubles	Bye	Northern Ireland; L 1 - 3	did not advance					

Team

Athlete	Event	Group Stage				Round of 16	Quarterfinals	Semifinals	Final	Rank
Athlete	Event	Opposition Result	Opposition Result	Opposition Result	Rank	Opposition Result	Opposition Result	Opposition Result	Opposition Result	Rank
Shamar Britton; Paul David; Christopher Franklin; Idi Lewis	Men's Team	Northern Ireland; L 0-3	Vanuatu; W 3-0	India; L 0-3	3 qB	Bye	Kenya; L 0-3	did not advance		
Jody-Ann Blake; Natalie Cummings; Chelsea Edghill; Trenace Lowe	Women's Team	Australia; L 0-3	Scotland; W 3-2	—N/a	2 Q	Canada; L 1-3	did not advance			

Qualification Legend: Q=Main Bracket (medal); qB=Consolation Bracket (non-medal)
