= Swimming at the 2014 Commonwealth Games – Women's 100 metre freestyle =

Women's 100 metre freestyle at the 2014 Commonwealth Games
- Venue: Tollcross International Swimming Centre
- Dates: 27 July 2014 (heats & semis); 28 July 2014 (final)
- Competitors: 47 from 28 nations
- Winning time: 52.68 GR

Medalists
| gold medal | Cate Campbell | Australia |
| silver medal | Bronte Campbell | Australia |
| bronze medal | Emma McKeon | Australia |

The women's 100 metre freestyle event at the 2014 Commonwealth Games as part of the swimming programme took place on 27 and 28 July at the Tollcross International Swimming Centre in Glasgow, Scotland.

The medals were presented by Louise Martin, Honorary Secretary of the Commonwealth Games Federation, Immediate Past Chair of Commonwealth Games Scotland and Vice-Chair of Glasgow 2014 and the quaichs were presented by Alfred C. Weir, Chairman of NVT Group.

== Records ==
Prior to this competition, the existing world and Commonwealth Games records were as follows.

| World record | Britta Steffen (GER) | 52.07 | Rome, Italy | 31 July 2009 |
| Commonwealth record | Cate Campbell (AUS) | 52.33 | Barcelona, Spain | 28 July 2013 |
| Games record | Bronte Campbell (AUS) | 53.15 | Glasgow, Scotland | 24 July 2014 |

The following records were established during the competition:

| Date | Event | Name | Nationality | Time | Record |
|---|---|---|---|---|---|
| 28 July | Final | Cate Campbell | Australia | 52.68 | GR |

== Results ==
=== Heats ===
| Rank | Heat | Lane | Name | Nationality | Time | Notes |
|---|---|---|---|---|---|---|
| 1 | 6 | 4 | Cate Campbell | Australia | 53.20 | Q |
| 2 | 4 | 4 | Emma McKeon | Australia | 54.19 | Q |
| =3 | 5 | 4 | Bronte Campbell | Australia | 54.42 | Q |
| =3 | 6 | 5 | Francesca Halsall | England | 54.42 | Q |
| 5 | 5 | 5 | Arianna Vanderpool-Wallace | Bahamas | 54.90 | Q |
| 6 | 5 | 3 | Sandrine Mainville | Canada | 55.16 | Q |
| 7 | 4 | 5 | Victoria Poon | Canada | 55.60 | Q |
| 8 | 5 | 6 | Samantha Lucie-Smith | New Zealand | 55.71 | Q |
| 9 | 4 | 6 | Alyson Ackman | Canada | 55.77 | Q |
| 10 | 4 | 3 | Amy Smith | England | 55.99 | Q |
| 11 | 6 | 6 | Rebecca Turner | England | 56.02 | Q |
| 12 | 5 | 1 | Ariel Weech | Bahamas | 56.50 | Q |
| =13 | 4 | 2 | Erin Gallagher | South Africa | 56.53 | Q |
| =13 | 6 | 7 | Hannah McCarthy | Wales | 56.53 | Q |
| 15 | 6 | 2 | Trudi Maree | South Africa | 57.20 | Q |
| 16 | 6 | 1 | Marina Chan | Singapore | 57.37 | Q |
| 17 | 6 | 8 | Chui Lai Kwan | Malaysia | 57.60 | |
| 18 | 5 | 7 | Sian Morgan | Wales | 57.76 | |
| 19 | 4 | 7 | Amanda Lim | Singapore | 57.78 | |
| 20 | 5 | 2 | Quah Ting Wen | Singapore | 57.92 | |
| 21 | 4 | 1 | Mari Davies | Wales | 58.15 | |
| 22 | 3 | 4 | Sylvia Brunlehner | Kenya | 58.78 | |
| 23 | 5 | 8 | Charlotte Atkinson | Isle of Man | 58.82 | |
| 24 | 3 | 1 | Olivia Plateau de Maroussen | Mauritius | 58.92 | |
| 25 | 2 | 4 | Caroline Puamau | Fiji | 59.04 | |
| 26 | 3 | 3 | Bethany Firth | Northern Ireland | 59.24 | |
| 27 | 3 | 7 | Courtney Butcher | Guernsey | 59.79 | |
| 28 | 3 | 8 | Felicity Passon | Seychelles | 1:00.15 | |
| 29 | 2 | 6 | Cheyenne Rova | Fiji | 1:00.41 | |
| 30 | 3 | 2 | Margarita Pissaridou | Cyprus | 1:00.74 | |
| 31 | 2 | 5 | Elinah Phillip | British Virgin Islands | 1:00.84 | |
| 32 | 3 | 6 | Jade Howard | Zambia | 1:01.26 | |
| 33 | 2 | 3 | Emily Chan Chee | Mauritius | 1:01.96 | |
| 34 | 2 | 7 | Danielle Awori | Kenya | 1:02.90 | |
| 35 | 1 | 4 | Tieri Erasito | Fiji | 1:03.12 | |
| 36 | 2 | 8 | Lianna Swan | Pakistan | 1:03.32 | NR |
| 37 | 2 | 1 | Christina Linares | Gibraltar | 1:03.50 | |
| 38 | 1 | 1 | Ger Ogot | Kenya | 1:04.89 | |
| 39 | 1 | 5 | Rachel Wall | Antigua and Barbuda | 1:05.49 | |
| 40 | 2 | 2 | Irene Prescott | Tonga | 1:05.51 | |
| 41 | 3 | 5 | Kirstie Millar | Malawi | 1:06.03 | |
| 42 | 1 | 6 | Aminath Shajan | Maldives | 1:06.60 | |
| 43 | 1 | 3 | Onika George | Guyana | 1:07.02 | |
| 44 | 1 | 7 | Jocelyn Flynn | Papua New Guinea | 1:07.17 | |
| 45 | 1 | 2 | Magdalena Moshi | Tanzania | 1:07.58 | |
| | 4 | 8 | Rachel Bethel | Northern Ireland | | DNS |
| | 6 | 3 | Karin Prinsloo | South Africa | | DNS |

=== Semifinals ===
| Rank | Heat | Lane | Name | Nationality | Time | Notes |
|---|---|---|---|---|---|---|
| 1 | 2 | 4 | Cate Campbell | Australia | 53.19 | Q |
| 2 | 2 | 5 | Bronte Campbell | Australia | 53.67 | Q |
| 3 | 1 | 4 | Emma McKeon | Australia | 53.92 | Q |
| 4 | 2 | 3 | Arianna Vanderpool-Wallace | Bahamas | 54.41 | Q |
| 5 | 1 | 5 | Francesca Halsall | England | 54.88 | Q |
| 6 | 1 | 3 | Sandrine Mainville | Canada | 55.09 | Q |
| 7 | 2 | 6 | Victoria Poon | Canada | 55.19 | Q |
| 8 | 2 | 2 | Alyson Ackman | Canada | 55.71 | Q |
| 9 | 1 | 2 | Amy Smith | England | 55.77 | |
| 10 | 2 | 1 | Erin Gallagher | South Africa | 55.86 | |
| 11 | 2 | 7 | Rebecca Turner | England | 55.95 | |
| 12 | 1 | 6 | Samantha Lucie-Smith | New Zealand | 56.09 | |
| 13 | 1 | 1 | Hannah McCarthy | Wales | 56.13 | |
| 14 | 2 | 8 | Trudi Maree | South Africa | 56.53 | |
| 15 | 1 | 7 | Ariel Weech | Bahamas | 56.58 | |
| 16 | 1 | 8 | Marina Chan | Singapore | 57.49 | |

=== Final ===
| Rank | Lane | Name | Nationality | Time | Notes |
|---|---|---|---|---|---|
| 1st place, gold medalist(s) | 4 | Cate Campbell | Australia | 52.68 | GR |
| 2nd place, silver medalist(s) | 5 | Bronte Campbell | Australia | 52.86 | |
| 3rd place, bronze medalist(s) | 3 | Emma McKeon | Australia | 53.61 | |
| 4 | 2 | Francesca Halsall | England | 53.99 | |
| 5 | 6 | Arianna Vanderpool-Wallace | Bahamas | 54.37 | |
| =6 | 1 | Victoria Poon | Canada | 55.15 | |
| =6 | 7 | Sandrine Mainville | Canada | 55.15 | |
| 8 | 8 | Alyson Ackman | Canada | 55.47 | |
