= Swimming at the 2014 Commonwealth Games – Women's 50 metre freestyle =

Women's 50 metre freestyle at the 2014 Commonwealth Games
- Venue: Tollcross International Swimming Centre
- Dates: 25 July 2014 (heats & semis); 26 July 2014 (final)
- Competitors: 57 from 33 nations
- Winning time: 23.96 GR

Medalists
gold medal	Francesca Halsall	England
silver medal	Cate Campbell	Australia
bronze medal	Bronte Campbell	Australia

The women's 50 metre freestyle event at the 2014 Commonwealth Games as part of the swimming programme took place on 25 and 26 July at the Tollcross International Swimming Centre in Glasgow, Scotland.

The medals were presented by Alison Sheppard, 2002 Commonwealth champion and the quaichs were presented by Francis Paul, Secretary-General of the National Olympic Committee of Kenya.

== Records ==
Prior to this competition, the existing world and Commonwealth Games records were as follows.

World record	Britta Steffen (GER)	23.73	Rome, Italy	2 August 2009
Commonwealth record	Libby Trickett (AUS)	23.97	Sydney, Australia	29 March 2008
Games record	Libby Lenton (AUS)	24.61	Melbourne, Australia	20 March 2006

The following records were established during the competition:

Date	Event	Name	Nationality	Time	Record
25 July	Heat	Bronte Campbell	Australia	24.52	GR
25 July	Heat	Francesca Halsall	England	24.31	GR
25 July	Semifinal	Cate Campbell	Australia	24.17	GR
25 July	Semifinal	Francesca Halsall	England	24.14	GR
26 July	Final	Francesca Halsall	England	23.96	GR

== Results ==
=== Heats ===
Rank	Heat	Lane	Name	Nationality	Time	Notes
1	7	4	Francesca Halsall	England	24.31	Q, GR
2	8	4	Cate Campbell	Australia	24.33	Q
3	6	4	Bronte Campbell	Australia	24.52	Q, GR
4	7	3	Arianna Vanderpool-Wallace	Bahamas	24.61	Q
5	8	5	Melanie Schlanger	Australia	24.87	Q
6	7	5	Amy Smith	England	25.08	Q
7	8	3	Sian Harkin	Scotland	25.30	Q
8	6	5	Victoria Poon	Canada	25.38	Q
9	7	6	Michelle Williams	Canada	25.48	Q
10	6	3	Sandrine Mainville	Canada	25.62	Q
11	8	6	Jess Lloyd	England	25.64	Q
12	8	2	Trudi Maree	South Africa	25.80	Q
13	6	6	Amanda Lim	Singapore	25.81	Q
14	7	7	Ariel Weech	Bahamas	25.93	Q
15	6	2	Chui Lai Kwan	Malaysia	26.00	Q, NR
16	7	2	Hannah McCarthy	Wales	26.12	Q
17	8	7	Marina Chan	Singapore	26.17	
18	7	1	Sylvia Brunlehner	Kenya	26.86	
19	6	1	Caroline Puamau	Fiji	26.87	
20	8	1	Quah Ting Wen	Singapore	26.90	
21	5	7	Olivia Plateau de Maroussen	Mauritius	26.99	
22	5	2	Danielle Hill	Northern Ireland	27.23	
23	6	7	Mari Davies	Wales	27.25	
24	3	5	Izzy Joachim	Saint Vincent and the Grenadines	27.30	
25	5	1	Laura Kinley	Isle of Man	27.34	
26	8	8	Margarita Pissaridou	Cyprus	27.42	
27	4	4	Jamila Lunkuse	Uganda	27.43	
28	4	3	Courtney Butcher	Guernsey	27.48	
29	6	8	Felicity Passon	Seychelles	27.52	
30	5	6	Elinah Phillip	British Virgin Islands	27.57	
31	7	8	Bethany Firth	Northern Ireland	27.61	
32	5	3	Rachel Bethel	Northern Ireland	27.70	
33	4	7	Matelita Buadromo	Fiji	27.75	
34	4	5	Emily Chan Chee	Mauritius	27.83	
35	5	8	Cheyenne Rova	Fiji	27.84	
36	5	5	Jade Howard	Zambia	27.94	
37	4	8	Joyce Tafatatha	Malawi	28.05	
38	3	4	Tilka Paljk	Zambia	28.20	
39	4	2	Oreoluwa Cherebin	Grenada	28.50	
40	3	3	Barbara Vali-Skelton	Papua New Guinea	28.62	
41	4	6	Irene Prescott	Tonga	28.77	
42	3	1	Amarah Phillip	British Virgin Islands	28.95	
43	3	6	Christina Linares	Gibraltar	29.05	
44	4	1	Ophelia Swayne	Ghana	29.09	
45	3	7	Lianna Swan	Pakistan	29.10	
=46	2	5	Mariam Foum	Tanzania	29.16	
=46	3	8	Savannah Tkatchenko	Papua New Guinea	29.16	
=48	2	3	Evelina Afoa	Samoa	29.25	
=48	3	2	Anita Field	Kenya	29.25	
50	2	6	Rachel Wall	Antigua and Barbuda	29.35	
51	1	4	Kiran Khan	Pakistan	29.46	
52	5	4	Kirstie Millar	Malawi	29.50	
53	2	4	Onika George	Guyana	29.55	
54	1	5	Jocelyn Flynn	Papua New Guinea	29.80	
55	2	2	Magdalena Moshi	Tanzania	29.97	
56	1	3	Adora Lawrence	Saint Vincent and the Grenadines	31.23	
57	2	7	Aminath Shajan	Maldives	31.25	

=== Semifinals ===
Rank	Heat	Lane	Name	Nationality	Time	Notes
1	2	4	Francesca Halsall	England	24.14	Q, GR
2	1	4	Cate Campbell	Australia	24.17	Q, GR
3	1	5	Arianna Vanderpool-Wallace	Bahamas	24.42	Q
4	2	3	Melanie Schlanger	Australia	24.59	Q
5	2	5	Bronte Campbell	Australia	24.62	Q
6	1	3	Amy Smith	England	25.09	Q
7	1	6	Victoria Poon	Canada	25.15	Q
8	2	6	Sian Harkin	Scotland	25.29	Q
9	2	2	Michelle Williams	Canada	25.45	
10	2	7	Jess Lloyd	England	25.59	
11	1	7	Trudi Maree	South Africa	25.60	
12	1	1	Ariel Weech	Bahamas	25.72	
13	1	2	Sandrine Mainville	Canada	25.76	
14	2	1	Amanda Lim	Singapore	25.93	
15	1	8	Hannah McCarthy	Wales	25.97	
16	2	8	Chui Lai Kwan	Malaysia	26.10	

=== Final ===
Rank	Lane	Name	Nationality	Time	Notes
1st place, gold medalist(s)	4	Francesca Halsall	England	23.96	GR
2nd place, silver medalist(s)	5	Cate Campbell	Australia	24.00	
3rd place, bronze medalist(s)	2	Bronte Campbell	Australia	24.20	
4	3	Arianna Vanderpool-Wallace	Bahamas	24.34	
5	6	Melanie Schlanger	Australia	24.39	
6	1	Victoria Poon	Canada	25.29	
7	8	Sian Harkin	Scotland	25.31	
8	7	Amy Smith	England	25.37	
