= British Virgin Islands at the 2014 Commonwealth Games =

- Flag of the British Virgin Islands
- CG code: IVB
- CGA: British Virgin Islands Olympic Committee
- Website: bviolympics.org

in Glasgow, Scotland
- Competitors: 10 in 3 sports
- Flag bearer: Chantel Malone
- Medals: Gold 0 Silver 0 Bronze 0 Total 0

Commonwealth Games appearances (overview)
- 1990; 1994; 1998; 2002; 2006; 2010; 2014; 2018; 2022; 2026; 2030

The British Virgin Islands competed in the 2014 Commonwealth Games in Glasgow, Scotland from 23 July – 3 August 2014. On 7 July 2014 a team of 10 athletes in 3 sports was announced.

== Athletics ==
The British Virgin Islands's team consisted of 7 athletes.

Men

Athlete	Event	Heat		Semifinal		Final	
Athlete	Event	Result	Rank	Result	Rank	Result	Rank
Shaquoy Stephens	200 m	DNS		Did not advance			

Field

Athlete	Event	Qualification		Final	
Athlete	Event	Distance	Position	Distance	Position
Eldred Henry	Discus throw	51.39	15	Did not advance	
Eldred Henry	Shot put	17.08	16	Did not advance	

Combined events – Decathlon

Athlete	Event	100 m	LJ	SP	HJ	400 m	110H	DT	PV	JT	1500 m	Final	Rank
Keron Stoute	Result	11.32	DNS	Did not finish									
Keron Stoute	Points	791	DNS	Did not finish									

Women

Athlete	Event	Heat		Semifinal		Final	
Athlete	Event	Result	Rank	Result	Rank	Result	Rank
Karene King	100 m	11.93	27	Did not advance			
Karene King	200 m	24.22	20 q	24.67	23	Did not advance	
Ashley Kelly	200 m	24.40	23 Q	24.00	17	Did not advance	
Ashley Kelly	400 m	54.26	20 q	54.35	22	Did not advance	

Field events

Athlete	Event	Qualification		Final	
Athlete	Event	Distance	Position	Distance	Position
Chantel Malone	Long jump	6.55	2 Q	6.41	4

Key

- Note–Ranks given for track events are within the athlete's heat only
- Q = Qualified for the next round
- q = Qualified for the next round as a fastest loser or, in field events, by position without achieving the qualifying target
- NR = National record
- N/A = Round not applicable for the event
- Bye = Athlete not required to compete in round

== Squash ==
The squash team consists of one athlete.

Athlete	Event	Round of 64	Round of 32	Round of 16	Quarterfinals	Semifinals	Final
Athlete	Event	Opposition Score	Opposition Score	Opposition Score	Opposition Score	Opposition Score	Opposition Score
Joe Chapman	Men's Singles	J Fayia (SLE); W 3-0	K Ndhlovu (ZAM); L 1-3	Did not advance			

== Swimming ==
The swimming team consisted of two female athletes.

Women

Athlete	Event	Heat		Semifinal		Final	
Athlete	Event	Time	Rank	Time	Rank	Time	Rank
Amarah Phillip	50 metre freestyle	28.95	42	Did not advance			
Elinah Phillip	50 metre freestyle	27.57	30	Did not advance			
Elinah Phillip	100 metre freestyle	1:00.84	31	Did not advance			
Amarah Phillip	50 metre butterfly	30.94	38	Did not advance			
Amarah Phillip	100 metre butterfly	1:09.19	26	Did not advance			
