= Shushila Devi Likmabam =

Indian judoka (born 1995)

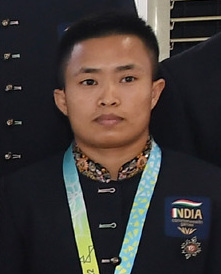
- Likmabam in August 2022

Personal information
- Full name: Shushila Devi Likmabam
- Born: 1 February 1995 (age 31) Manipur, India
Medal record
Representing India
Commonwealth Games
Silver medal – second place	2014 Glasgow	48 kg
Silver medal – second place	2022 Birmingham	48 kg
South Asian Games
Gold medal – first place	2019 Kathmandu/Pokhara	48 kg

Shushila Devi Likmabam (born 1 February 1995) is an Indian judoka who won the silver medal in the women's 48 kg weight class at the judo at the 2014 Commonwealth Games at Glasgow. She hails from Manipur state in India. Likmabam had earlier pinned Chloe Rayner in the semis. She won the silver medal in women's 48 kg judo.

At 2014 Commonwealth Games, she won silver medal in the women's 48 kg judo losing to Kimberley Renicks in the gold medal match.

At 2019 South Asian Games, she won gold medal in women's 48 kg weight class.

Likmabam qualified for the 2020 Summer Olympics as the lone representative for India in judo(Best ever in india). She competed in the women's 48 kg event and was eliminated in the first round.

At 2022 Commonwealth Games, she won silver medal in the women's 48 kg judo losing to South Africa's Michaela Whitebooi in the gold medal match.
