= 2014 Commonwealth Games opening ceremony =

Opening ceremony for UK Sporting event

- Stage production at the climax of the opening ceremony, showing models of the Finnieston Crane and Forth Bridge
- Date: 23 July 2014
- Time: 21:00 – 23:40 BST (UTC+1)
- Location: Celtic Park, Glasgow, Scotland; 55°50′59″N 4°12′20″W
- Also known as: Come on In
- Filmed by: BBC Scotland
- Participants: Karen Dunbar; John Barrowman; Amy MacDonald; Rod Stewart; Susan Boyle; Ewan McGregor

The opening ceremony for the 2014 Commonwealth Games was held at Celtic Park in Glasgow, Scotland, between 21:00 and 23:40 BST, on 23 July 2014.

== Proceedings ==
=== Countdown ===
The ceremony began with a dramatic countdown, starting at 30 seconds, which was then interrupted at 15 seconds by Scottish actor Ewan McGregor to announce a partnership with the 2014 Commonwealth Games and UNICEF. During this segment, McGregor claims that the games hope to "team up" with the viewers and would announce further details later in the show. The ceremony then continues with a countdown, starting from 14 seconds, with "The Mother We Share" by Chvrches playing, featuring aerial shots of Glasgow, including the River Clyde and Clyde Arc.

=== Welcome to Scotland ===
The ceremony show begins with a camera zooming in on Scottish comedian Karen Dunbar who is sitting in the audience of Celtic Park. Dunbar stands up and begins to sing in a cappella accompanied by backing dancers, singing a song entitled "Welcome to Scotland". Dunbar is then joined by John Barrowman who emerges from behind a kilt in a car who transports him around the stadium on a tour around Scotland that has been created within the stadium, taking viewers through areas such as Ayrshire, where they focus on the works of Robert Burns, Gretna Green, significant as a place of marriage as the age of marriage in Scotland was lower than that elsewhere in the British Isles. The ceremony then focuses on the works of the River Clyde shipbuilding industry and the various ships constructed in Glasgow on the River Clyde during its peak of production.

The Highlands are represented through a rendition of "Loch Lomond" by Scottish band Runrig. Scottish culture is showcased through a variety of people dancing in costumes styled as Tunnock tea cakes, followed by a makeshift Loch Ness Monster being celebrated as a showcase of Scottish tourism and heraldry. Highland Cow, Highland pony and Dolly the Sheep are mentioned as a further showcase of Scottish culture and wildlife.

The ceremony recognises Scotland as the home of golf with a showcase focusing on St Andrews. Lastly, Barrowman then begins rapidly listing a list of Scottish inventions, such as the telephone, tyre, television and the toilet to name a few.

The segment finishes with Dunbar singing alone on top of the bus with a model of the Forth Bridge. Dunbar then begins singing "Welcome to Scotland" followed by the volunteers used during the opening production waving into the camera as they run off the platform. Barrowman is then seen standing on a constructed model of the Finnieston Crane with the message "Welcome to Glasgow" displayed in an LED screen behind him.

=== Come on In ===
Dunbar welcomes the crowd to the games and the broadcast cuts to thousands of spectators watching the ceremony at Glasgow Green. Amy MacDonald performs a rendition of "Rhythm of My Heart" in George Square with the public of Glasgow. Following a pre-recorded segment in George Square, MacDonald then sings part of the song in the stadium before welcoming Rod Stewart who then finishes off the song.

=== Arrival of the Queen ===
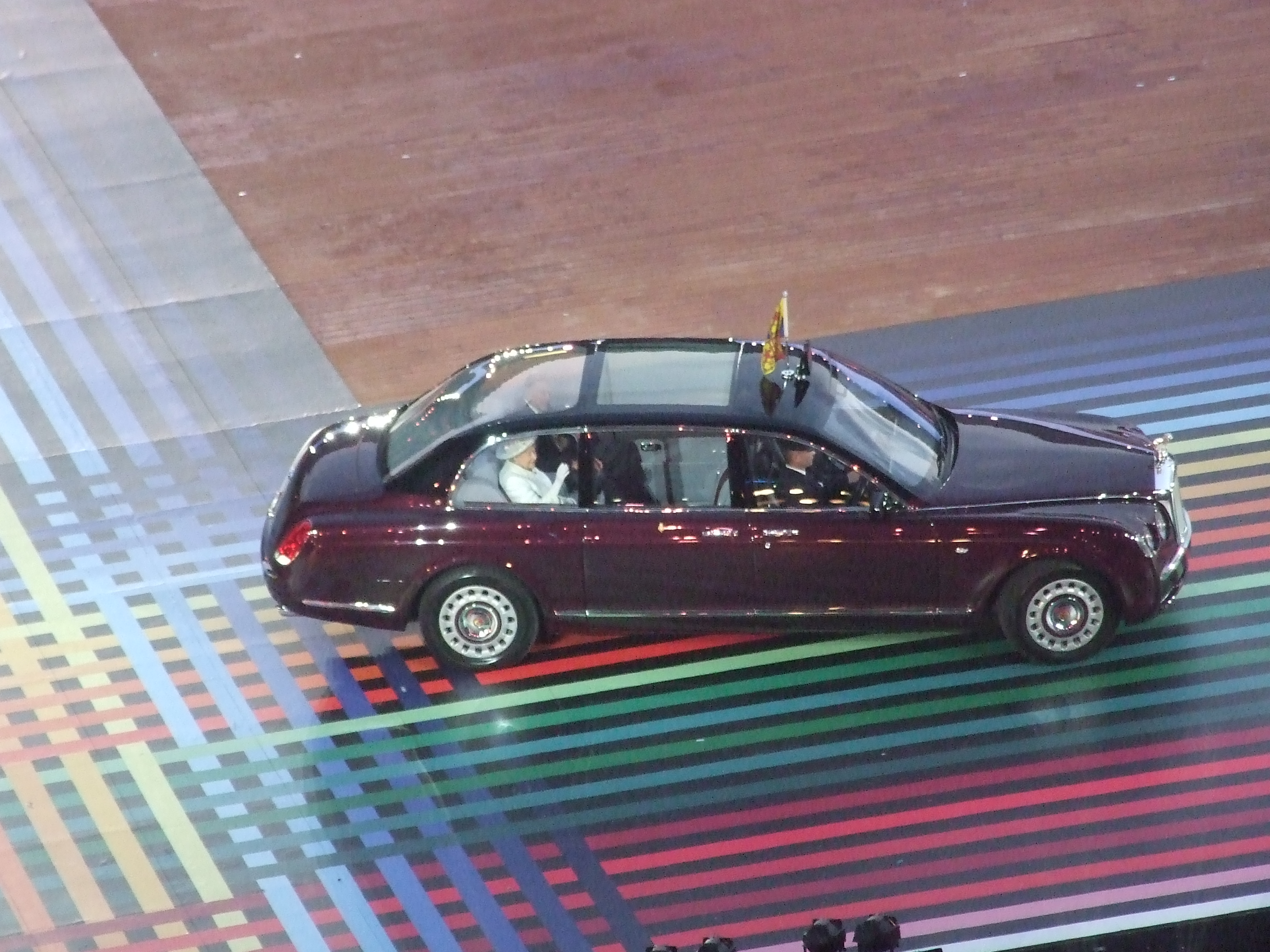
The Queen and Prince Philip arrive by car

As with tradition at Commonwealth Games opening ceremonies, the Flag of India, Flag of Scotland and the Flag of Australia are raised, with India hosting the previous games in 2010, Scotland hosting the current games in 2014, and Australia hosting the next games in 2018. Susan Boyle performs a rendition of "Mull of Kintyre" to usher in Queen Elizabeth II accompanied by Prince Philip, Duke of Edinburgh. The British national anthem "God Save the Queen" was then performed. The Red Arrows fly over by, with blue and white smoke to symbolise the 2014 Commonwealth Games being held in Scotland.

=== Arrival of the Queen's Baton ===
The Queen's Baton is flown into Glasgow on a sea plane that lands on the River Clyde and is carried by broadcaster and cyclist Mark Beaumont.

=== Tartan display ===
In preparation for the Parade of Nations, volunteers perform to "Feel So Close" by Scottish DJ Calvin Harris, and music included by Andy Stewart as a tribute to his contribution to Scottish music and culture. Volunteer dancers are then seen erecting chairs for the athletes which were sourced across Glasgow. 500 volunteer dancers were used for this segment of the ceremony.

=== Parade of Nations ===
The ceremony was directed by David Zolkwer and included the 2014 Commonwealth Games Parade of Nations where 71 athletes, bearing the flags of their respective nations and territories, led their national delegations as they paraded into the stadium. The games were formally opened by Her Majesty Queen Elizabeth II. She referred to the Commonwealth's "shared ideals and ambitions" and the "bonds that unite" its members.

During the Parade of Nations at the 2014 Commonwealth Games opening ceremony, held on 23 July 2014, 71 athletes bearing the flags of their respective nations lead their national delegations as they paraded into Celtic Park in the host city of Glasgow, Scotland. Each team was led out by a Scottish Terrier, wearing a jacket bearing the name of the country, followed by the flag bearer for that nation.

As the host of the last games, India entered first, followed by the rest of the Asian countries competing. Following this was Oceania, Africa, the Caribbean, the Americas and finally Europe. The Scotland team entered last, representing the host nation. In all cases nations entered in alphabetic order of their country names in English within their regions (besides India and Scotland).

In honouring the victims of the Malaysia Airlines Flight 17 tragedy that occurred the week before the opening ceremony, the Malaysian delegation was led by eight athletes in Malaysia Airlines cabin crew uniform while the remaining athletes and officials wore black armbands, and the national flag was at half mast. A minute's silence was also observed.

==== Countries and flagbearers ====
Below is a list of parading countries and their announced flag bearer, in the same order as the parade. This is sortable by country name, flag bearer's name, or flag bearer's sport. Names are given in the form officially designated by the CGF. The first team to enter the stadium was India, host of the 2010 Commonwealth Games, maintaining the tradition of the immediate previous host nation entering first.

Order	Nation	Flag bearer	Sport
1	India	Vijay Kumar	Shooting
2	Bangladesh	Iqbal Islam	Shooting
3	Brunei	Muhammad Imaadi Abd Aziz	Cycling
4	Malaysia	Fatehah Mustapa	Cycling
5	Maldives	Hassan Saaid	Athletics
6	Pakistan	Azhar Hussain	Wrestling
7	Singapore	Lim Heem Wei	Gymnastics
8	Sri Lanka	Sudesh Peiris	Weightlifting
9	Australia	Anna Meares	Cycling
10	Cook Islands	Patricia Taea	Athletics
11	Fiji	Litia Tikoisuva	Lawn bowls
12	Kiribati	David Katoatau	Weightlifting
13	Nauru	Itte Detenamo	Weightlifting
14	New Zealand	Valerie Adams	Athletics
15	Niue	Hina Reriti	Lawn bowls
16	Norfolk Island	John Christian	Lawn bowls
17	Papua New Guinea	Steven Kari	Weightlifting
18	Samoa	Ele Opeloge	Weightlifting
19	Solomon Islands	Jenly Tegu Wini	Weightlifting
20	Tonga	Uaine Fa Jr	Boxing
21	Tuvalu	Lapua Lapua	Weightlifting
22	Vanuatu	Yoshua Shing	Table tennis
23	Botswana	Nigel Amos	Athletics
24	Cameroon	Vanetius Njuh	Weightlifting
25	Ghana	Janet Amponsah	Athletics
26	Kenya	Mercy Obiero	Weightlifting
27	Lesotho	Mokhotho Moroke	Boxing
28	Malawi	Mataya Tsoyo	Cycling
29	Mauritius	Kate Foo Kune	Badminton
30	Mozambique	Kurt Couto	Athletics
31	Namibia	Helalia Johannes	Athletics
32	Nigeria	Maryam Usman	Weightlifting
33	Rwanda	Theogene Hakizimana	Powerlifting
34	Seychelles	Clementina Agricole	Weightlifting
35	Sierra Leone	James Fayla	Squash
36	South Africa	Cecil Afrika	Rugby sevens
37	Swaziland	Phumlile Ndzinisa	Athletics
38	Tanzania	Seleman Salum Kidunda	Boxing
39	Uganda	Charles Ssekyaaya	Weightlifting
40	Zambia	Punza Mathews	Judo
41	Anguilla	Rechelle Meade	Athletics
42	Antigua and Barbuda	Daniel Bailey	Athletics
43	Bahamas	Arianna Vanderpool-Wallace	Swimming
44	Barbados	Shane Brathwaite	Athletics
45	British Virgin Islands	Chantel Malone	Athletics
46	Cayman Islands	Michele Smith	Cycling
47	Dominica	Brendan Williams	Athletics
48	Grenada	Kirani James	Athletics
49	Jamaica	Warren Weir	Athletics
50	Montserrat	Julius Morris	Athletics
51	Saint Kitts and Nevis	Antoine Adams	Athletics
52	Saint Lucia	Levern Spencer	Athletics
53	Saint Vincent and the Grenadines	Kineke Alexander	Athletics
54	Trinidad and Tobago	Keshorn Walcott	Athletics
55	Turks and Caicos Islands	Angelo Garland	Athletics
56	Belize	Katy Sealy	Athletics
57	Bermuda	Micah Franklin	Squash
58	Canada	Susan Nattrass	Shooting
59	Falkland Islands	Mike Brownlee	Badminton
60	Guyana	Geron Williams	Cycling
61	Saint Helena	Simon Henry	Shooting
62	Cyprus	Georgios Achilleos	Shooting
63	England	Nick Matthew	Squash
64	Gibraltar	Chris Walker	Triathlon
65	Guernsey	Chris Simpson	Squash
66	Isle of Man	Tim Kneale	Shooting
67	Jersey	Steve Le Couilliard	Shooting
68	Malta	Kevin Arthur Moore	Athletics
69	Northern Ireland	Martyn Irvine	Cycling
70	Wales	Francesca Jones	Gymnastics
71	Scotland	Euan Burton	Judo

== Programme ==
The programme, which included about 2,000 performers, featured Karen Dunbar, John Barrowman, Amy Macdonald, Rod Stewart, Susan Boyle, Nicola Benedetti, Julie Fowlis, Pumeza Matshikiza, Eric Whitacre and the National Youth Choir of Scotland, as well as a message from the International Space Station. The ceremony began with a countdown and a recorded video message from Scottish actor Ewan McGregor, explaining the partnership between the Games and UNICEF.

Following the arrival of the Queen there was a flypast by the Red Arrows display team. The venue featured the largest LED video screen in Europe, supplied by Sports Technology. Scotland's then First Minister Alex Salmond welcomed the participants and spectators, and introduced a moment of silence in memory of the Malaysia Airlines Flight 17 disaster.

The final part of the Queen's Baton Relay was run by 32 Scottish volunteers nominated for giving their time to developing the nation's youth through sport. The baton was then passed to Sir Chris Hoy, who delivered it to President of the Commonwealth Games Federation Prince Imran and the Queen. The display of the message concealed within the baton was delayed by a difficulty in opening the device.

The Games were launched in partnership with UNICEF, to save and change children’s lives. The unique partnership aimed "to use the power of sport to reach every child in Scotland and benefit children in every Commonwealth nation and territory."

== Broadcast ==
The ceremony was broadcast by BBC One, and was introduced by Gary Lineker, Hazel Irvine, Clare Balding and Huw Edwards. The estimated worldwide television audience was one billion, with 9 million in the UK.
