= British Virgin Islands at the 2010 Commonwealth Games =

- Flag of the British Virgin Islands
- CGF code: IVB
- CGA: British Virgin Islands Olympic Committee
- Website: bviolympics.org

in Delhi, India
- Competitors: 2 in 2 sports
- Flag bearers: Opening:Joe Chapman; Closing:
- Medals: Gold 0 Silver 0 Bronze 0 Total 0

Commonwealth Games appearances (overview)
- 1990; 1994; 1998; 2002; 2006; 2010; 2014; 2018; 2022; 2026; 2030

The British Virgin Islands competed at the 2010 Commonwealth Games held in Delhi, India, from 3 to 14 October 2010.

The British Virgin Islands was represented by two athletes: Tahesia Harrigan in athletics, and Joe Chapman in squash.

== See also ==
- 2010 Commonwealth Games
