= British Virgin Islands at the Commonwealth Games =

- Flag of the British Virgin Islands
- CG code: IVB
- CGA: British Virgin Islands Olympic Committee
- Website: bviolympics.org
- Medals Ranked 41st: Gold 3 Silver 0 Bronze 0 Total 3

Commonwealth Games appearances (overview)
- 1990; 1994; 1998; 2002; 2006; 2010; 2014; 2018; 2022; 2026; 2030

The British Virgin Islands have attended all seven Commonwealth Games since 1990.

Having first competed at Auckland in 1990, the British Virgin Islands had never won a medal of any colour at a Commonwealth Games until Kyron McMaster won the men's 400m hurdles at the 2018 Commonwealth Games at Gold Coast.

It was McMaster's first global title, having been disqualified from the 400m hurdles at the 2017 IAAF World Athletics Championships, though he did go on to win the 2017 IAAF Diamond League title the following month.

== Summary ==
Games	Athletes	Gold	Silver	Bronze	Total	Rank
(New Zealand) 1990 Auckland	-	0	0	0	0	-
(Canada) 1994 Victoria	-	0	0	0	0	-
(Malaysia) 1998 Kuala Lumpur	-	0	0	0	0	-
(England) 2002 Manchester	-	0	0	0	0	-
(Australia) 2006 Melbourne	5	0	0	0	0	-
(India) 2010 New Delhi	2	0	0	0	0	-
(Scotland) 2014 Glasgow	10	0	0	0	0	-
(Australia) 2018 Gold Coast	10	1	0	0	1	26
(England) 2022 Birmingham	17	1	0	0	1	26
(Scotland) 2026 Glasgow	11	1	0	0	1	=23
Total	-	3	0	0	3	41
