= British Virgin Islands at the 2006 Commonwealth Games =

- Flag of the British Virgin Islands
- CGF code: IVB
- CGA: British Virgin Islands Olympic Committee
- Website: bviolympics.org

in Melbourne, Australia
- Competitors: 5 (4 men and 1 woman) in 3 sports
- Flag bearers: Opening: Closing:
- Medals: Gold 0 Silver 0 Bronze 0 Total 0

Commonwealth Games appearances (overview)
- 1990; 1994; 1998; 2002; 2006; 2010; 2014; 2018; 2022; 2026; 2030

The British Virgin Islands was represented at the 2006 Commonwealth Games in Melbourne. It did not win any medals at the games.

== Medals ==
	(gold)	(silver)	(bronze)	Total
British Virgin Islands	0	0	0	0
