= Ntholeng Lechesa =

Lesotho squash player

- Country: Lesotho
- Born: 29 March 1997 (age 27); Morija, Lesotho

Ntholeng Lechesa (born 29 March 1997) is a Lesotho male squash player. He made his first Commonwealth Games appearance during the 2014 Commonwealth Games representing Lesotho at the age of 17 and competed in the men's singles and men's doubles categories.
