= Turks and Caicos Islands at the 2014 Commonwealth Games =

- Flag of the Turks and Caicos Islands
- CG code: TCA
- CGA: Turks and Caicos Islands Commonwealth Games Association

in Glasgow, Scotland
- Competitors: 10 in 3 sports
- Flag bearer: Angelo Garland
- Medals: Gold 0 Silver 0 Bronze 0 Total 0

Commonwealth Games appearances (overview)
- 1978; 1982–1994; 1998; 2002; 2006; 2010; 2014; 2018; 2022; 2026; 2030

Turks and Caicos Islands competed in the 2014 Commonwealth Games in Glasgow, Scotland from 23 July to 3 August 2014.

== Athletics ==
Men
Track & road events

Athlete	Event	Heat		Semifinal		Final	
Athlete	Event	Result	Rank	Result	Rank	Result	Rank
Wadly Jean	200 m	22.26	61	did not advance			
Angelo Garland	400 m	48.86	38	did not advance			
Angelo Garland; Barney Handfield; Wadly Jean; Courtney Missick; Domanique Missick; Ifeanyi Otuonye	4 × 400 m relay	3:19.11	11	—N/a		did not advance	

Field Events

Athlete	Event	Qualification		Final	
Athlete	Event	Distance	Rank	Distance	Rank
Ifeanyi Otuonye	Long jump	7.47	16	did not advance	
Kivarno Handfield	High jump	No Mark		did not advance	
Domanique Missick	High jump	2.11	14	did not advance	

Key

- Note–Ranks given for track events are within the athlete's heat only
- Q = Qualified for the next round
- q = Qualified for the next round as a fastest loser or, in field events, by position without achieving the qualifying target
- NR = National record
- N/A = Round not applicable for the event

== Weightlifting ==
Men

Athlete	Event	Snatch		Clean & Jerk		Total	Rank
Athlete	Event	Result	Rank	Result	Rank	Total	Rank
Ronald Parker	−77 kg	85	26	100	25	185	25
Michael Francois	−94 kg	75	14	105	12	180	12
