= Judo at the 2014 Commonwealth Games – Women's 48 kg =

Judo Judo – Women's 48 kg at the 2014 Commonwealth Games
- Venue: Scottish Exhibition and Conference Centre
- Date: 24 July 2014
- Competitors: 9 from 7 nations

Medalists
gold medal	Kimberley Renicks	Scotland
silver medal	Shushila Likmabam	India
bronze medal	Amy Meyer	Australia
bronze medal	Chloe Rayner	Australia

The women's 48 kg Judo competitions at the 2014 Commonwealth Games in Glasgow, Scotland was held on 24 July at the Scottish Exhibition and Conference Centre. Judo returned to the program, after last being competed back in 2002.

== Results ==
=== Preliminaries ===
Round of 16
Sushila Likmabam (IND)	1010
M Medza Effa (CMR)	0001

Quarterfinals
C Rayner (AUS)	0001
A Chindele (ZAM)	0003
A Meyer (AUS)	0003
Sushila Likmabam (IND)	1000
C Kavanagh (NZL)	0001
O-O Okey (BAR)	0102
K Renicks (SCO)	1000
M Monabang (CMR)	0001

Semifinals
C Rayner (AUS)	000
Sushila Likmabam (IND)	102
O-O Okey (BAR)	000
K Renicks (SCO)	100

Gold medal match
Sushila Likmabam (IND)	0002
K Renicks (SCO)	1000

=== Repechages ===
Repechage		Bronze medal
Abigail Chindele (ZAM)	0012
Amy Meyer (AUS)	0110	Amy Meyer (AUS)	0002
		Onoh-Obasi Okey (BAR)	0003

Repechage		Bronze medal
Chanel Kavanagh (NZL)	0001
Marcelle Monabang (CMR)	1011	Marcelle Monabang (CMR)	0000
		Chloe Rayner (AUS)	0010
