= Athletics at the 2014 Commonwealth Games – Men's 200 metres =

Men's 200 metres at the Commonwealth Games

The Men's 200 metres at the 2014 Commonwealth Games, as part of the athletics programme, took place at Hampden Park on 30 and 31 July 2014.

== Records ==
World Record	19.19	Usain Bolt	JAM	Berlin, Germany	20 August 2009
Games Record	19.97	Frank Fredericks	NAM	Victoria, Canada	1994

== Heats ==
First 2 in each heat (Q) and 4 best losers (q) advance to the Semifinals

=== Heat 1 ===
Rank	Lane	Name	Reaction Time	Result	Notes	Qual.
1	3	Ncincilili Titi (RSA)	0.159	20.66		Q
2	2	Banuve Tabakaucoro (FIJ)	0.134	21.04	SB	Q
3	5	Bruno Mastenjwa (SWZ)	0.189	21.08		
4	7	Tim Abeyie (GHA)	0.180	21.12		
5	6	Brijesh Lawrence (SKN)	0.202	21.21		
6	8	Nelson Stone (PNG)	0.192	21.51		
7	4	Jerai Torres (GIB)	0.186	22.95	SB	
–	1	Lester Ryan (MNT)	–	–	DSQ	
				Wind: −0.5 m/s		

=== Heat 2 ===
Rank	Lane	Name	Reaction Time	Result	Notes	Qual.
1	1	Mosito Lehata (LES)	0.163	20.68		Q
2	8	Winston George (GUY)	0.229	20.88		Q
3	4	Rondel Sorrillo (TRI)	0.150	20.98		q
4	7	Adeseye Ogunlewe (NGR)	0.185	21.11	PB	
5	2	Solomon Bockarie (SLE)	0.175	21.45		
6	3	Chengwei Lee (SIN)	0.175	21.87	SB	
7	5	Collins Omae Gichana (KEN)	0.201	21.90		
8	6	Reuberth Boyde (SVG)	0.322	22.23		
				Wind: −0.2 m/s		

=== Heat 3 ===
Rank	Lane	Name	Reaction Time	Result	Notes	Qual.
1	6	Warren Weir (JAM)	0.193	20.71		Q
2	3	Daniel Bailey (ANT)	0.158	20.74		Q
3	4	Jereem Richards (TRI)	0.172	21.13		
4	2	Neddy Marie (SEY)	0.227	21.78	PB	
5	1	Courtney Carl Williams (SVG)	0.155	21.94		
–	5	Idrissa Adam (CMR)	–	–	DNS	
–	8	Shaquoy Stephens (IVB)	–	–	DNS	
				Wind: −0.4 m/s		

=== Heat 4 ===
Rank	Lane	Name	Reaction Time	Result	Notes	Qual.
1	3	Danny Talbot (ENG)	0.159	20.56		Q
2	6	Brendon Rodney (CAN)	0.161	20.77		Q
3	5	Emmanuel Dasor (GHA)	0.167	21.06		
4	2	Titus Kafunda (ZAM)	0.156	21.20		
5	4	Muhammad Bin Asmin (SIN)	0.161	21.90		
6	8	Rosen Daniel (LCA)	0.172	22.06		
7	7	Golden Gunde (MAW)	0.230	22.39		
–	1	Shanoi Richardson (ANG)	–	–	DNS	
				Wind: +0.5 m/s		

=== Heat 5 ===
Rank	Lane	Name	Reaction Time	Result	Notes	Qual.
1	8	Andre De Grasse (CAN)	0.153	20.56		Q
2	6	Akani Simbine (RSA)	0.164	20.77		Q
3	4	Leon Reid (NIR)	0.159	20.97		q
4	2	Solomon Afful (GHA)	0.191	21.02	PB	
5	7	Stephan James (GUY)	0.173	21.08		
6	5	Eddie Hereme (SAM)	0.172	22.07		
7	3	Arlen Skerritt (MNT)	0.171	24.37		
–	1	Tom Druce (GUE)	–	–	DNS	
				Wind: −0.8 m/s		

=== Heat 6 ===
Rank	Lane	Name	Reaction Time	Result	Notes	Qual.
1	5	Gavin Smellie (CAN)	0.145	20.74		Q
2	7	Wayde van Niekerk (RSA)	0.192	20.84		Q
3	2	Kevin Moore (MLT)	0.192	21.07		
4	3	Hassan Saaid (MDV)	0.151	21.38		
5	4	Lestrod Roland (SKN)	0.164	21.42		
6	1	Theo Piniau (PNG)	0.161	21.77		
7	6	Mark Anderson (BIZ)	0.203	22.37		
				Wind: +0.9 m/s		

=== Heat 7 ===
Rank	Lane	Name	Reaction Time	Result	Notes	Qual.
1	4	Jason Livermore (JAM)	0.175	20.71		Q
2	3	James Ellington (ENG)	0.144	20.73		Q
3	2	Adam Harris (GUY)	0.164	21.19		
4	6	Harold Houston (BER)	0.158	21.39		
5	7	Tyrell Cuffy (CAY)	0.190	21.75		
6	1	Michael Wilson (GRN)	0.147	21.90		
7	5	Hussain Inaas (MDV)	0.211	22.78	PB	
–	8	Mlandvo Shongwe (SWZ)	–	–	DSQ	
				Wind: +1.5 m/s		

=== Heat 8 ===
Rank	Lane	Name	Reaction Time	Result	Notes	Qual.
1	5	Rasheed Dwyer (JAM)	0.185	20.59		Q
2	1	Christopher Clarke (ENG)	0.162	20.71		Q
3	7	Jarrod Geddes (AUS)	0.158	21.03		
4	6	Jonathan Permal (MRI)	0.179	21.21		
5	3	Kasheem Colbourne (ANT)	0.169	21.92		
6	4	Wadly Jean (TCI)	0.138	22.26		
7	2	Alphonse Binam Nlend (GIB)	0.214	–	DQ	
				Wind: −1.8 m/s		

=== Heat 9 ===
Rank	Lane	Name	Reaction Time	Result	Notes	Qual.
1	4	Antoine Adams (SKN)	0.146	20.88		Q
2	8	Teray Smith (BAH)	0.173	20.91		Q
3	5	Joel Redhead (GRN)	0.203	20.97		q
4	2	Corneil Lionel (LCA)	0.134	21.30		
5	3	Leeroy Henriette (SEY)	0.187	21.75	SB	
6	6	Kimorie Shearman (SVG)	0.214	21.85		
7	7	David Hamil (CAY)	0.201	22.02	SB	
				Wind: +0.5 m/s		

=== Heat 10 ===
Rank	Lane	Name	Reaction Time	Result	Notes	Qual.
1	5	Michael Mathieu (BAH)	0.190	20.55		Q
2	1	Carvin Nkanata (KEN)	0.212	20.65		Q
3	7	Kyle Greaux (TRI)	0.185	20.79		q
4	6	Obinna Metu (NGR)	0.160	21.19		
5	3	Julius Morris (MNT)	0.173	21.44		
6	4	Ruwan Gunasinghe (PNG)	0.184	22.44		
7	2	Masbah Ahmmed (BAN)	0.192	–	DQ	
				Wind: −0.7 m/s		

== Semifinals ==
=== Heat 1 ===
Rank	Lane	Name	Reaction Time	Result	Notes	Qual.
1	5	Jason Livermore (JAM)	0.177	20.47		Q
2	3	Danny Talbot (ENG)	0.160	20.47		Q
3	8	Daniel Bailey (ANT)	0.162	20.49	PB	q
4	6	Gavin Smellie (CAN)	0.165	20.54		q
5	7	Winston George (GUY)	0.203	20.88		
6	1	Joel Redhead (GRN)	0.180	20.99		
7	2	Teray Smith (BAH)	0.149	21.13		
8	4	Ncincilili Titi (RSA)	0.154	–	DQ	
				Wind: +0.3 m/s		

=== Heat 2 ===
Rank	Lane	Name	Reaction Time	Result	Notes	Qual.
1	6	Warren Weir (JAM)	0.182	20.48		Q
2	5	Mosito Lehata (LES)	0.165	20.54		Q
3	1	Rondel Sorrillo (TRI)	0.151	20.57		
4	3	Michael Mathieu (BAH)	0.161	20.68		
5	8	Wayde van Niekerk (RSA)	0.170	20.69		
6	4	Christopher Clarke (ENG)	0.161	20.71		
7	7	Brendon Rodney (CAN)	0.190	20.89		
8	2	Banuve Tabakaucoro (FIJ)	–	–	DQ	
				Wind: +0.3 m/s		

=== Heat 3 ===
Rank	Lane	Name	Reaction Time	Result	Notes	Qual.
1	4	Rasheed Dwyer (JAM)	0.163	20.42		Q
2	8	Akani Simbine (RSA)	0.154	20.53		Q
3	6	Carvin Nkanata (KEN)	0.212	20.65		
4	7	James Ellington (ENG)	0.139	20.66		
5	3	Andre De Grasse (CAN)	0.150	20.73		
6	5	Antoine Adams (SKN)	0.135	20.76		
7	1	Kyle Greaux (TRI)	0.167	20.93		
8	2	Leon Reid (NIR)	0.162	21.03		
				Wind: +0.2 m/s		

== Final ==
Rank	Lane	Name	Reaction Time	Result	Notes
1st place, gold medalist(s)	4	Rasheed Dwyer (JAM)	0.186	20.14	
2nd place, silver medalist(s)	3	Warren Weir (JAM)	0.167	20.26	
3rd place, bronze medalist(s)	5	Jason Livermore (JAM)	0.150	20.32	
4	7	Mosito Lehata (LES)	0.195	20.36	NR
5	8	Akani Simbine (RSA)	0.174	20.37	PB
6	2	Daniel Bailey (ANT)	0.150	20.43	PB
7	6	Danny Talbot (ENG)	0.175	20.45	
8	1	Gavin Smellie (CAN)	0.133	20.55	
				Wind: +0.5 m/s	
