= Steven Finitsis =

Australian squash player (born 1983)

Personal information
- Born: 19 January 1983 (age 43) Innisfail, Queensland, Australia
- Height: 1.88 m (6 ft 2 in)
- Weight: 80 kg (176 lb)

Sport
- Country: Australia
- Handedness: Right Handed
- Turned pro: 2004
- Coached by: Willem Van Kleef, Marc Forster
- Retired: 2016
- Racquet used: Karakal

Men's singles
- Highest ranking: No. 45 (July 2014)
- Current ranking: No. 81 (April 2016)
- Title: 12
- Tour final: 25
- Updated on July 2016

Steven Finitsis (born 19 January 1983 in Innisfail, Queensland) is a former professional squash player who represented Australia. He reached a career-high world ranking of World No. 45 in July 2014.
