= Alexandros Axiotis =

Zambian swimmer (born 1996)

Personal information
- Nationality: Zambian
- Born: 11 March 1996 (age 30)

Sport
- Sport: Swimming

Alexandros Axiotis (born 11 March 1996) is a Zambian swimmer. He competed in the men's 100 metre breaststroke event at the 2018 FINA World Swimming Championships (25 m), in Hangzhou, China.
