= Hartaj Bains =

Kenyan squash player

Personal information
- Born: 2 June 1979 (age 47) Nairobi, Kenya

Sport
- Country: Kenya
- Handedness: left-handed

Hartaj Bains (born 2 June 1979) is a former Kenyan male squash player. He is also the younger brother of fellow Kenyan squash player, Rajdeep Bains. Hartaj Bains and his brother, Rajdeep Bains also competed together for the Kenyan squash team at the 2007 Men's World Team Squash Championships.

He also represented Kenya at the 2014 Commonwealth Games and competed in the men's singles event.
