= Kimberley Renicks =

Scottish judoka (born 1988)

Personal information
- Born: 11 February 1988 (age 38) Bellshill, Scotland

Sport
- Country: Scotland
- Sport: Judo
- Event: Women's 48 kg
Medal record
Women's judo
Representing Scotland
Commonwealth Games
Gold medal – first place	2014 Glasgow	48 kg
- Updated on 7 September 2014

Kimberley Renicks (born 11 February 1988 in Bellshill) is a Scottish Judoka, who won gold at the 2014 Commonwealth Games.

== Judo career ==
She won the Commonwealth Games gold medal in the Women's 48 kg Judo event at the 2014 Commonwealth Games in Glasgow. Her older sister Louise is also a judoka who won a gold medal at the same Games.

On 22 February 2018, it was announced that National Tyres and Autocare were to become a sponsor of Renicks.

Renicks is a four times champion of Great Britain, winning the extra-lightweight division at the British Judo Championships in 2015, 2017, 2018 and 2019. In 2022, she competed in her second Commonwealth Games in Birmingham.
