= Zambia at the 2014 Commonwealth Games =

- CG code: ZAM
- CGA: National Olympic Committee of Zambia
- Website: nocz.co.zm

in Glasgow, Scotland
- Competitors: 47
- Flag bearer: Punza Mathews
- Medals Ranked 33rd: Gold 0 Silver 0 Bronze 2 Total 2

Commonwealth Games appearances (overview)
- 1954; 1958; 1962–1966; 1970; 1974; 1978; 1982; 1986; 1990; 1994; 1998; 2002; 2006; 2010; 2014; 2018; 2022; 2026; 2030

Other related appearances
- Rhodesia and Nyasaland (1962)

Zambia competed in the 2014 Commonwealth Games in Glasgow, Scotland from 23 July – 3 August 2014.

== Medalists ==
Medal	Name	Sport	Event	Date
Bronze	Boas Munyonga	Judo	Men's 81 kg	July 25
Bronze	Benny Muziyo	Boxing	Men's Middleweight	Aug 1

== Athletics ==
Men

Athlete	Event	Round 1		Semifinal		Final	
Athlete	Event	Result	Rank	Result	Rank	Result	Rank
Titus Kafunda	100 m	10.53	4	Did not advance			
Titus Kafunda	200 m	21.20	4	Did not advance			
Saviour Kombe	400 m	46.41	3 Q	47.70	7	Did not advance	
Titus Kafunda; Emmanuel Mwewa; Prince Mumba (Heat Only); Saviour Kombe; Cephas Nyimbili (Final Only)	4 x 400 metres relay	3:07.43	3 q	—N/a		Disqualified	

Women
Track & road events

Athlete	Event	Heat		Semifinal		Final	
Athlete	Event	Result	Rank	Result	Rank	Result	Rank
Yvonne Nalishuwa	100 m	12.19	6	Did not advance			
Kabange Mupopo	400 m	53.18	2 Q	53.09	6	Did not advance	
Rhoda Njobvu	400 m	57.47	7	Did not advance			

Key

- Note–Ranks given for track events are within the athlete's heat only
- Q = Qualified for the next round
- q = Qualified for the next round as a fastest loser or, in field events, by position without achieving the qualifying target
- NR = National record
- N/A = Round not applicable for the event

== Judo ==
Men

Athlete	Event	Round of 32	Round of 16	Quarterfinals	Semifinals	Repechage	Final / BM	
Athlete	Event	Opposition Result	Opposition Result	Opposition Result	Opposition Result	Opposition Result	Opposition Result	Rank
William Kalunga	−60 kg	—N/a	Sigauque (MOZ); L 1000-0000	Did not advance				
Mathews Punza	−66 kg	Theuil (VAN); W 101–000	Mlugu (TAN); W 0001–0003	A Krassas (CYP); L 0003–1002	Did not advance	Luzia (MOZ); L 100-001	Millar (SCO); L 0002-1001	5
Boas Munyonga	−81 kg	Bye	Naulu (FIJ); W 1001-0004	Livesey (ENG); L 0004–1010	Did not advance	Messi (CMR); W 1003-0004	Krieber-Gagnon (CAN); W 1001–0000	3rd place, bronze medalist(s)

Women

Athlete	Event	Round of 16	Quarterfinal	Semifinal	Repechage	Final / BM	
Athlete	Event	Opposition Result	Opposition Result	Opposition Result	Opposition Result	Opposition Result	Rank
Abigail Chindele	−48 kg	Bye	Rayner (AUS); L0003-0001	Did not advance	Meyer (AUS); L0110-0012	Did not advance	7

== Swimming ==
Men

Athlete	Event	Heat		Semifinal		Final	
Athlete	Event	Time	Rank	Time	Rank	Time	Rank
Milimo Mweetwa	50 m freestyle	26.41	57	Did not advance			
Matthew Shone	50 m freestyle	26.11	53	Did not advance			
Matthew Shone	100 m freestyle	57.97	50	Did not advance			
Alexandros Axiotis	50 m backstroke	28.24	24	Did not advance			
Milimo Mweetwa	50 m backstroke	30.87	=30	Did not advance			
Alexandros Axiotis	100 m backstroke	1:01.64	27	Did not advance			
Milimo Mweetwa	100 m backstroke	1:07.22	32	Did not advance			
Alexandros Axiotis	50 m breaststroke	30.25	22	Did not advance			
Matthew Shone	50 m breaststroke	32.08	30	Did not advance			
Alexandros Axiotis	100 m breaststroke	1:06.03	21	Did not advance			
Ralph Goveia	100 m breaststroke	1:07.54	24	Did not advance			
Matthew Shone	100 m breaststroke	1:10.71	28	Did not advance			
Ralph Goveia	50 m butterfly	25.35	18	Did not advance			
Milimo Mweetwa	50 m butterfly	27.70	37	Did not advance			
Ralph Goveia	100 m butterfly	56.33	19	Did not advance			
Alexandros Axiotis	200 m individual medley	2:14.58	20	—N/a		Did not advance	
Ralph Goveia	200 m individual medley	2:13.90	19	—N/a		Did not advance	
Alexandros Axiotis; Ralph Goveia; Milimo Mweetwa; Matthew Shone	4 × 100 m freestyle relay	3:49.62	13	—N/a		Did not advance	
Alexandros Axiotis; Ralph Goveia; Milimo Mweetwa; Matthew Shone	4 × 100 m medley relay	4:12.10	13	—N/a		Did not advance	

Women

Athlete	Event	Heat		Semifinal		Final	
Athlete	Event	Time	Rank	Time	Rank	Time	Rank
Jade Howard	50 m freestyle	27.94	36	Did not advance			
Tilka Paljk	50 m freestyle	28.20	38	Did not advance			
Jade Howard	100 m freestyle	1:01.26	32	Did not advance			
Jade Howard	50 m backstroke	33.10	29	Did not advance			
Tilka Paljk	50 m breaststroke	35.19	23	Did not advance			
Tilka Paljk	100 m breaststroke	1:20.44	33	Did not advance			
