= Adam Harris (athlete) =

American sprinter (born 1987)

Personal information
- Born: July 21, 1987 (age 39) Wheaton, Illinois, United States
- Height: 1.78 m (5 ft 10 in)
- Weight: 77 kg (170 lb)

Sport
- Country: Guyana
- Sport: Athletics
- Event: Sprint
- Updated on 11 December 2014

Adam Harris (born July 21, 1987) is an American sprinter who represented Guyana in the 2008 Summer Olympics, 2009 World Championships, 2013 World Championships and 2014 World Indoor Championships.

He competed in the 200 metres event at the 2008 Olympic Games, but without reaching the final round.

His personal best time is 20.60 seconds, achieved in July 2013 in Morelia, Mexico. Harris is also the Guyanese National Record Holder in the 100 metres and 60 metres dashes. He has 9.90 seconds (wind-aided)/10.09 seconds (wind-legal) in the 100 metres, and 6.55 seconds in the 60 metres, achieved in February 2014 at the Kelly Family Sports Center in Allendale on the campus of Grand Valley State University.

Harris grew up in Wheaton, Illinois, and attended Wheaton North High School, where he was coached by track and field specialist Don Helberg. After graduating he attended The University of Michigan.

== Personal bests ==
=== Outdoor ===
- 100 m: 10.12 s (wind: +0.4 m/s) – Port of Spain, Trinidad and Tobago, 17 May 2014
- 200 m: 20.60 s A (wind: +0.3 m/s) – Morelia, Mexico, 7 July 2013
- Long jump: 7.32 m (wind: NWI) – Columbus, United States, 5 April 2008

=== Indoor ===
- 60 m: 6.55 s – Allendale, United States, 21 February 2014
- 200 m: 20.99 s – State College, United States, 1 March 2009
- Long jump: 7.58 m – Madison, United States, 1 March 2008

== Achievements ==
Year	Competition	Venue	Position	Event	Notes
Representing Guyana
2008	Olympic Games	Beijing, China	6th (h)	200 m	21.36 (wind: +0.1 m/s)
2009	World Championships	Berlin, Germany	32nd (qf)	100m	10.39 (wind: −0.7 m/s)
2009	World Championships	Berlin, Germany	43rd (h)	200m	21.28 (wind: −1.5 m/s)
2010	Central American and Caribbean Games	Mayagüez, Puerto Rico	100m	14th (h)	10.44 (wind: +1.1 m/s)
2010	Central American and Caribbean Games	Mayagüez, Puerto Rico	200m	13th	21.12 (wind: −1.0 m/s)
2010	Commonwealth Games	Delhi, India	31st (qf)	100m	11.88 (wind: +0.9 m/s)
2011	Pan American Games	Guadalajara, Mexico	24th (h)	100m	10.62 A (wind: +1.2 m/s)
2011	Pan American Games	Guadalajara, Mexico	30th (h)	200m	22.45 A (wind: +0.2 m/s)
2013	Central American and Caribbean Championships	Morelia, Mexico	6th	100m	10.24 A (wind: +0.5 m/s)
2013	Central American and Caribbean Championships	Morelia, Mexico	6th	200m	20.60 A (wind: −0.9 m/s)
2013	World Championships	Moscow, Russia	31st (h)	100m	10.30 (wind: −0.2 m/s)
2014	World Indoor Championships	Sopot, Poland	9th (sf)	60m	6.59
2014	Commonwealth Games	Glasgow, United Kingdom	6th (sf)	100m	10.23 (wind: +0.7 m/s)
2014	Commonwealth Games	Glasgow, United Kingdom	3rd (h)	200m	21.19 (wind: +1.5 m/s)
2014	Commonwealth Games	Glasgow, United Kingdom	–	4 × 100 m relay	DQ
2014	Central American and Caribbean Games	Xalapa, Mexico	6th (h)	100m	10.75 A (wind: -0.7 m/s)
2014	Central American and Caribbean Games	Xalapa, Mexico	5th	4 × 100 m relay	39.74 A
2016	World Indoor Championships	Portland, United States	39th (h)	60 m	6.82
