= Amy Meyer =

Australian judoka

Personal information
- Born: 19 September 1991 (age 35) Paddington, New South Wales
Medal record
Women's Judo
Representing Australia
Commonwealth Games
| Bronze medal – third place | Glasgow 2014 | 48 kg |

Amy Meyer (born 19 September 1991) is an Australian judoka. She won a bronze medal at the 2014 Commonwealth Games in the women's 48 kg division. She has also earned a bronze medal in World Cup Competition.

== Biography ==
Meyer started training with Warren Rosser, a University of New South Wales (UNSW) judo coach, at age seven. She is also a former Emanuel School student. In 2013, she graduated from Sydney University.

Meyer moved into the Senior Competitive ranks in 2009 and has participated in numerous continental and regional matches. In 2013, she won a bronze medal in the World Cup Competition in Apia, Samoa, which she had also done the previous year. In 2014, Meyer won a bronze medal at the 2014 Commonwealth Games in the women's 48 kg division. The Commonwealth Games were a possible stepping stone for Meyer to go on to the 2016 Olympic Games. Meyer has called the experience of being considered for the 2016 Olympics "surreal." Her current coach, Kylie Koenig, is also part of UNSW.

Meyer describes her training schedule as normally twice a day, six to seven days a week. She combines judo training with weights and conditioning. In order to pursue judo and her dream of the Olympics, she has put her career on hold.
