= Xavier Koenig =

Mauritian squash player (1984–2019)

Personal information
- Born: 7 August 1984 Mauritius
- Died: 30 May 2019 (aged 34)

Sport
- Country: Mauritius
- Retired: Active

Men's singles
- Updated on April 2018

Xavier Koenig (7 August 1984 – 30 May 2019) was a Mauritian squash player. He represented Mauritius at the Commonwealth Games in 2014 and 2018.
