= Kevin Moran (squash player) =

Scottish squash player (born 1990)

Personal information
- Nationality: British (Scottish)
- Born: 13 September 1990 (age 35) Paisley, Scotland

Sport
- Turned pro: 2009
- Retired: Active
- Racquet used: Harrow

Men's singles
- Highest ranking: No. 122 (November 2013)

Kevin Moran (born 13 September 1990) is a Scottish squash player who represented Scitland at two Commonwealth Games.

== Biography ==
Moran represented the Scottish team at the 2014 Commonwealth Games in Glasgow, where he competed in the singles and doubles events.

Moran was selected for the 2018 Scottish team at the 2018 Commonwealth Games in the Gold Coast, Australia, where he competed in the singles and mixed doubles events.
