= Sunil Seth =

Guyanese squash player (born 1990)

Personal information
- Born: August 22, 1990 (age 35) London, England
- Website: sethsquash.com

Sport
- Country: Guyana
- Turned pro: 2010
- Racquet used: Head

Men's singles
- Highest ranking: No. 122 (January 2015)
- Updated on April 2018

Sunil Seth (born 22 August 1990 in London), also known as Sunny Seth, is an English-born Guyanese squash player who represents Guyana. He achieved a career-high world ranking of 122 in January 2015. He has represented Guyana at the 2014 Commonwealth Games, the 2015 Pan American Games and the 2018 Commonwealth Games.
