= Othneil Bailey =

Vincentian squash player (born 1988)

Personal information
- Born: 8 February 1988 (age 38) Saint Vincent and the Grenadines

Sport
- Country: Saint Vincent and the Grenadines
- Retired: Active

Men's singles
- Updated on April 2018

Othneil Bailey (born 8 February 1988) is a Vincentian squash player. He has represented Saint Vincent and the Grenadines at the Commonwealth Games in 2014 and 2018.
