= Michael Kawooya (squash player) =

Ugandan squash player (born 1984)

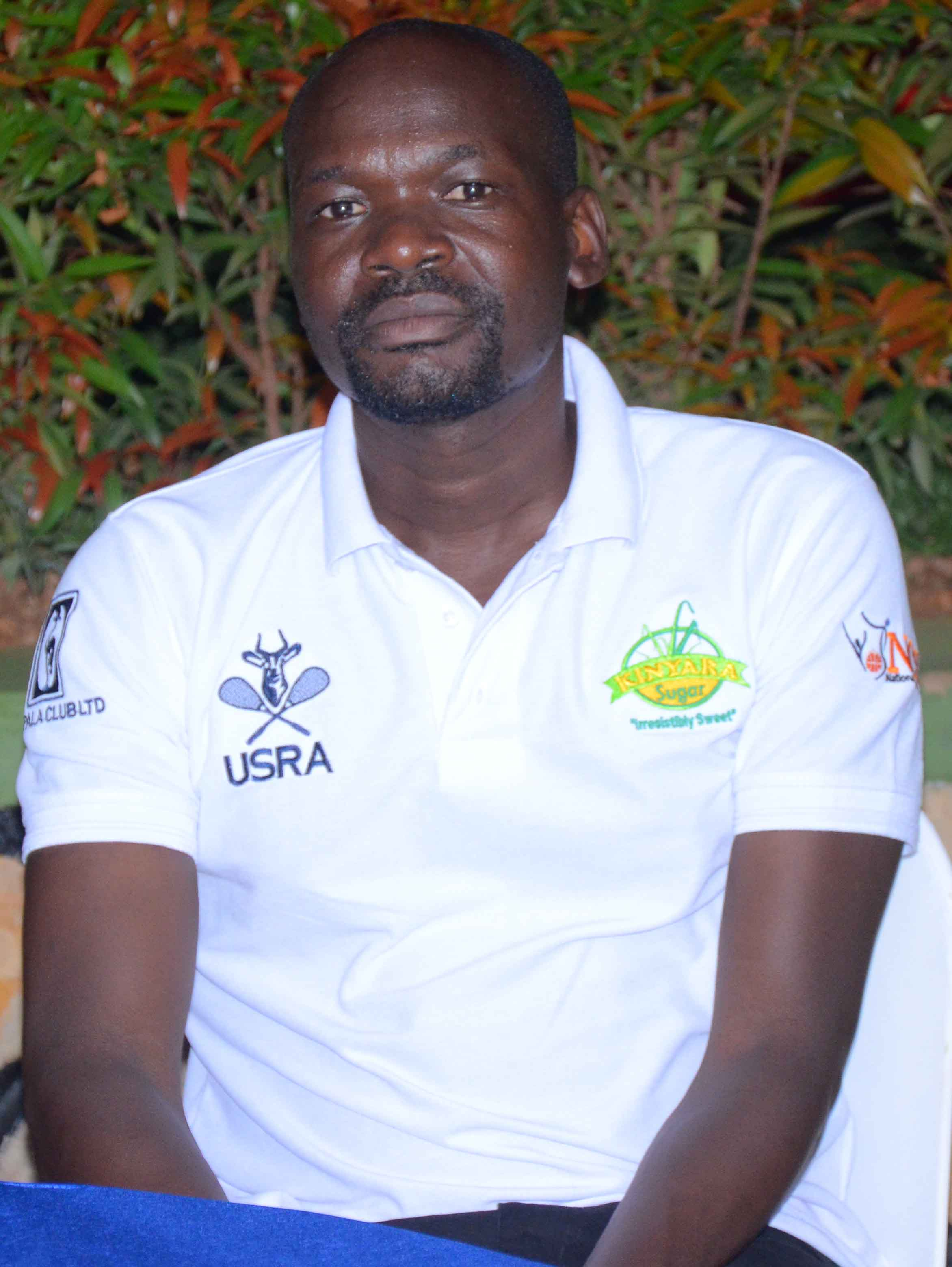
- Michael Kawooya

Personal information
- Born: 20 January 1984 (age 42) Mengo, Uganda

Sport
- Country: Uganda

Men's singles
- Highest ranking: No. 430 (July 2011)
- Updated on April 2018

Michael Kawooya (born 20 January 1984 in Mengo) is a Ugandan professional squash player. He has represented Uganda at the Commonwealth Games in 2010, 2014, 2018 and 2022.

The highest ranking he achieved in his career was World No. 430, in July 2011.

== Background and education ==
Micheal first competed in the 2010 game in Delhi. He acquired a world squash certificate(WSC) from Budapest city in Hungary in 2019.

== See also ==
- Ian Rukunya
- Ramy Ashour
- Official Men's Squash World Ranking
