= Trudi Maree =

South African swimmer (born 1988)

Personal information
- Born: 9 August 1988 (age 37) Bloemfontein

Sport
- Sport: Swimming

Trudi Maree (born 9 August 1988) is a South African swimmer. She was born in Bloemfontein. She competed in the women's 50m freestyle at the 2012 Summer Olympics in London, finishing with a time of 25.78 seconds in 36th place in the heats.
