= Chloe Rayner =

Australian judoka

Personal information
- Born: 18 September 1996 (age 30) Basildon, United Kingdom
Medal record
Women's Judo
Representing Australia
Commonwealth Games
Bronze medal – third place	Glasgow 2014	48 kg

Chloe Rayner (born 18 September 1996) is an Australian judoka. She won a bronze medal at the 2014 Commonwealth Games in the women's 48 kg division. She competed at the 2016 Summer Olympics in the women's 48 kg event, in which she was eliminated in the first round by Laëtitia Payet.
