= Jade Howard =

South African–Zambian swimmer

Personal information
- Full name: Jade Ashleigh Howard
- Nationality: South Africa; Zambia
- Born: 3 April 1995 (age 31) Johannesburg, South Africa
- Height: 1.82 m (6 ft 0 in)
- Weight: 68 kg (150 lb)

Sport
- Sport: Swimming
- Strokes: Freestyle
- College team: Plymouth Leander

Jade Ashleigh Howard (born 3 April 1995) is a South African–Zambian swimmer. At the 2012 Summer Olympics, she competed in the Women's 100 metre freestyle, finishing in 39th place overall in the heats, failing to qualify for the semifinals. She graduated from Plymouth College.
