= Cameron Stafford =

Squash player

- Born: Cameron Stafford; 23 March 1992 (age 33); Cayman Islands
- Occupations: Coach and Personal Trainer
- Years active: 2004–present

Cameron Stafford (born 23 March 1992) is a squash player in the Caribbean Region. He was the reigning Cayman Islands Junior Open Champion. He trained for the 2010 Commonwealth Games in India, representing the Cayman Islands. Stafford was an Under 13 Caribbean Tennis Champion in 2002, also winning the Florida Open for the U-15 Category in 2003. He is now a coach for Squash players of all ages and can sometimes be found competing in local tournaments in Grand Cayman.

== U-17 Junior Squash Championships ==
- 2007– "12th place in the Canadian Junior Open Squash Championships"
- 2007– "2nd place in the 25th Caribbean Junior Squash Championships"
- 2007 – Bronze Plate finalist in the British Junior Open (England)
- 2008 – 4th place in the South Sound Squash Club Championships (Cayman Islands)
- 2008 – 1st place in the Caribbean Squash Championships U17 (Bermuda)
- 2008 – 1st place in the Cayman Islands Junior Open (Cayman Islands)
- 2009 – 2nd place in the Caribbean Junior Squash Championships U19 (Barbados)
- 2010 – 2nd place in the Cayman Open (Cayman Islands)
- 2010 – 1st place in the Cayman Islands Junior Nationals (Cayman Islands)
- 2010 – 1st place in the Caribbean Junior Squash Championships U19 (Cayman Islands)

== Tournament participation ==
- 2010 – CAC Games (Bogotá, Colombia)
- 2010 – World Junior Squash Championships (Quito, Ecuador)
- 2010 – Caribbean Senior Squash Championships (St. Vincent)
- 2010 – Commonwealth Games (India)
