= Kelvin Ndhlovu =

Zambian squash player (born 1985)

Kevin Ndhlovu
Personal information
- Born: 23 September 1985 (age 40) Zambia

Sport
- Country: Zambia
- Retired: Active

Men's singles
- Highest ranking: No. 185 (April 2021)
- Updated on April 2021

Kelvin Ndhlovu (born 23 September 1985) is a Zambian squash player. He has represented Zambia at the Commonwealth Games in 2010, 2014 and 2018.

He was also the flagbearer for Zambia at the 2018 Commonwealth Games during the opening ceremony of the 2018 Commonwealth Games Parade of Nations.
