= Hardeep Reel =

Kenyan squash player

Personal information
- Born: 3 March 1981 (age 45) Nairobi, Kenya

Sport
- Country: Kenya

Men's singles
- Highest ranking: 308 (March 2007)

Hardeep Reel (born 3 March 1981) is a former Kenyan squash player. He has competed at the Commonwealth Games in 2006, 2010, 2014 and 2018.

He achieved his highest career ranking of 308 in March 2007.
