= Campbell Grayson =

New Zealand squash player

Personal information
- Born: 4 March 1986 (age 40) Auckland, New Zealand
- Height: 1.80 m (5 ft 11 in)
- Weight: 77 kg (170 lb)

Sport
- Country: New Zealand
- Handedness: Right-Handed
- Turned pro: 2007
- Coached by: Paul Hornsby
- Retired: 2020
- Racquet used: Dunlop Rackets

Men's Singles, Team Doubles
- Highest ranking: No. 24 (February 2020)
- Title: 14
- Tour final: 24
Medal record
Men's squash
Representing New Zealand
World Doubles Championships
Bronze medal – third place	2016 Darwin	Doubles
Bronze medal – third place	2017 Manchester	Doubles
- Updated on 13 April 2022

Campbell Grayson (born 4 March 1986 in Auckland, New Zealand) is a New Zealand retired professional squash player. He reached a career-high world ranking of World No. 24 in February 2020.

== Early life and education ==
Grayson first picked up tennis at the age of six, along with golf and cricket. From the ages of six to twelve, Grayson was selected to be a part of Auckland's elite tennis junior squad, and went on to win numerous Auckland Championship titles. Grayson represented Auckland in tennis at the New Zealand Junior Tennis Nationals in 1996 and made the semi-finals of the U-12 Doubles Event.

Training at Titirangi Rackets Club, Grayson's first home-club, Grayson's attention shifted to the game of squash, which his father played. Grayson picked up the squash racket and converted his attention to squash at eleven years old, after winning his first U-13 New Zealand Nationals title in 1997.

Grayson attended Kaurilands Primary School, Glen Eden Intermediate School and Avondale College. In 2005, Grayson was awarded the NZ Prime Minister's High Performance Scholarship. He studied at Unitec Institute of Technology, majoring in Sports Management. In 2006, Grayson was awarded the Sportsperson of the Year Award at Unitec, and in 2009, Grayson was awarded Sportsman of the Year by Squash Auckland.

== Career ==
Throughout his junior career, Grayson won the U-13, U-15, U-17, U-19 New Zealand age group national titles. In the final year of his junior career, he also won the U-19 New Zealand International Junior Open, Australian International Junior Open, and the Scottish International Junior Open. In the same year, he was placed 9th at the prestigious British Junior Open, and reached the last 16 at the 2004 World Junior Championships.

Following a successful junior career, Grayson's made his debut senior appearance at the 2005 World Senior Team Championships, which was held in Pakistan. A year later, in 2006, Grayson won the bronze medal at the 2006 World Doubles Championships in Melbourne, Australia, with his partner, Martin Knight. This performance gained him a position in the 2006 New Zealand Commonwealth Games team. During the 2006 Commonwealth Games, Grayson was placed 4th in the Men's Doubles Event.

Grayson started competing full-time on the PSA World Tour in 2007. As part of the New Zealand High Performance Program, Grayson relocated to Halifax, West Yorkshire, England (2007 - 2009). Thereafter, he moved to Harrogate, where he trained under the tutelage of David Pearson (2010 - 2012). He broke into the World's Top 50 ranking in October 2009, and the Top 40 in April 2010.

He has won two New Zealand Nationals Senior Titles (2010, 2012), and won the New Zealand PSA Classic in 2009.

Outside of New Zealand, Grayson won 14 PSA Tour Titles, and represented New Zealand at seven World Senior Team Championships, and four Commonwealth Games (2006, 2010, 2014 and 2018).

Career highlights include:

- Semi-Finalist, 2008 Australian Open
- Quarter-Finalist, 2008 Pakistan Open
- Finalist, 2010 Vancouver Open
- Round of 16, 2013 US Open
- Top-8, 2014 Commonwealth Games (Singles Event)
- Winner, 2019 Houston Open

In late 2012, Grayson relocated to the US. As at 2014 Grayson was based in New York City, and was the touring squash professional at New York Athletic Club. Previously, Grayson was based in Boston, as the touring squash professional at Cross Courts Academy, in Natick.

Grayson was a member of the New Zealand Sports High Performance Squad. Grayson also represented Auckland and the Herne Bay Club when in New Zealand.

In 2020 Grayson retired from professional squash.

== Personal life ==
Grayson participates in urban squash initiatives such as Harlem-based StreetSquash, which aims to improve the lives of inner-city children in Harlem through the game of squash; Grayson played for the Harvard Club of New York City at the 2015 StreetSquash Cup.
