= Ian Rukunya =

Ugandan squash player (born 1988)

Ian Kajubu Rukunya
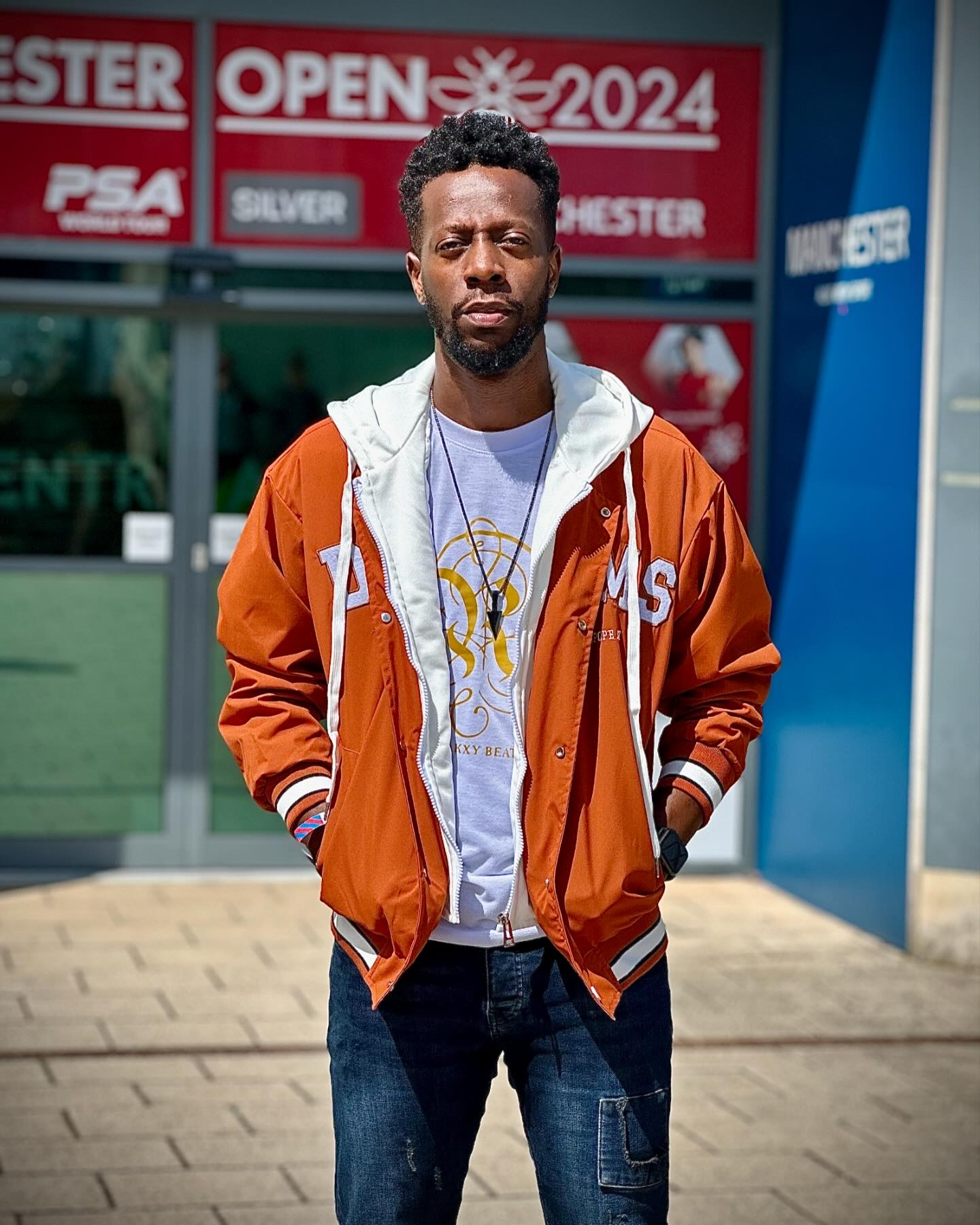

Personal information
- Born: 10 June 1988 (age 38) Uganda

Sport
- Country: Uganda
- Handedness: Squash
- Retired: Active

Men's married
- Title: Squash player
- Updated on 18 December 2025

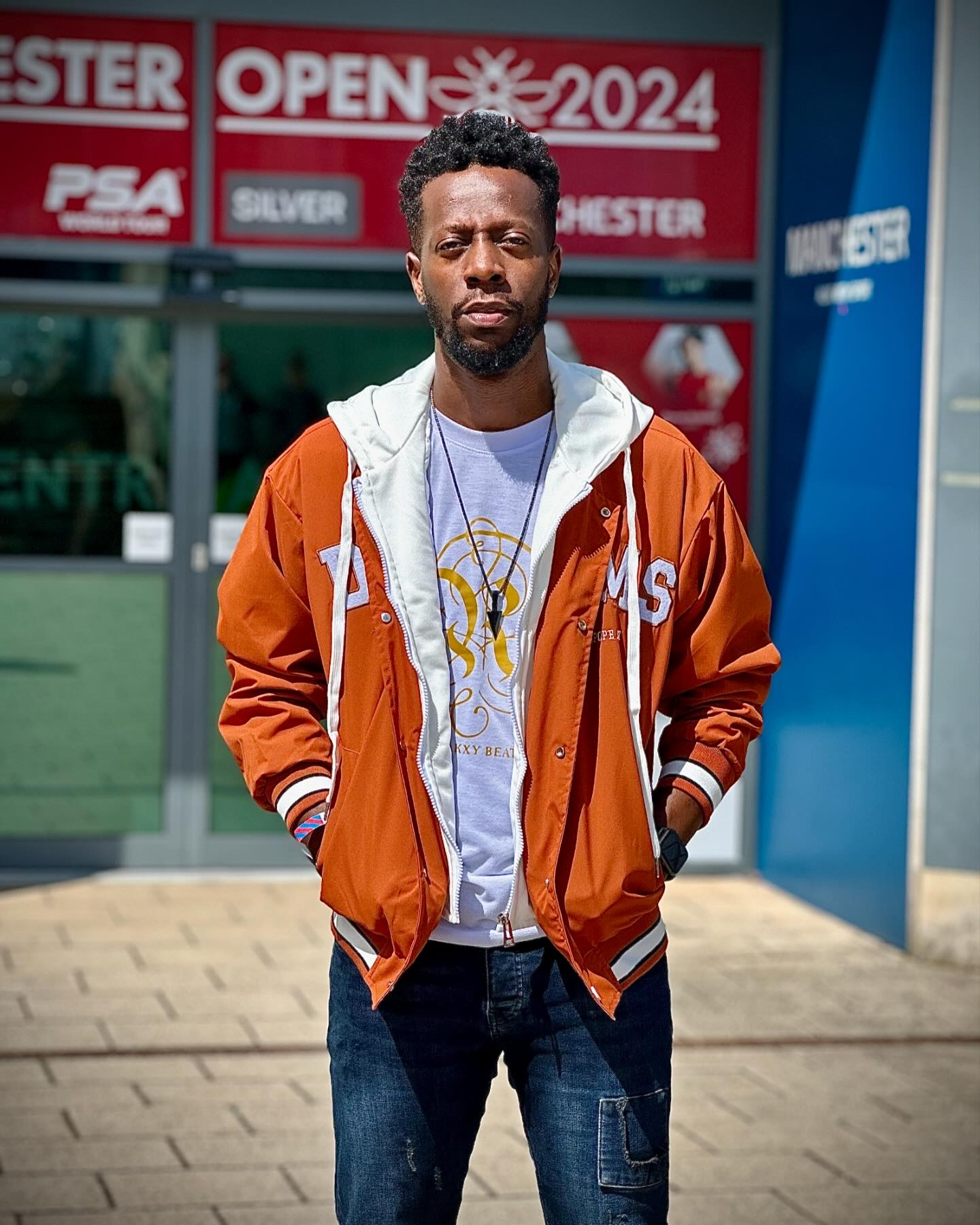
Rukunya at the National Squash Center for the Manchester Open 2024

Ian Kajubu Rukunya (born 12 June 1988) is an Ugandan squash player and worship leader. He has represented Uganda at the Commonwealth Games on four occasions, competing at the 2010 Commonwealth Games, 2014 Commonwealth Games, 2018 Commonwealth Games, and 2022 Commonwealth Games.

Rukunya achieved a career-high singles ranking of World No. 510 on the Professional Squash Association (PSA) World Rankings in February 2019. He has also been ranked No. 1 in Uganda on the Squash Levels ranking system.

== Background and education ==
Rukunya was born on 12 June 1988 at Lubaga Hospital in Kampala, the capital and largest city of Uganda. He is the first-born child of Simon Kajubu Rukunya and Milly Nyakahuma. He grew up in Kampala, where he attended Froebel Primary School in Bukoto for his primary education. He later studied at Old Kampala Secondary School for both his O-level and A-level studies.

Rukunya went on to attend Makerere University, where he graduated with a Bachelor’s degree in Information Technology.

== Personal information ==
Rukunya is married to Patience Mirembe. The two got married on Independence Day (9 October) 2021. He has also released his first worship single (The Price) which was recorded live at Peel Hall in Salford - available on his YouTube channel.

== Career ==
Rukunya currently lives in Manchester, United Kingdom. He plays Division 1 squash for Rochdale Sports Club.

He is also pursuing a Bachelor’s degree in Popular Music and Recording at the University of Salford. In addition to his studies, he serves on the worship team at Audacious Church.

Rukunya is involved in community work as a youth mentor supporting children in residential care who have been removed from their families due to abuse or safeguarding concerns.

He was head of Information Technology at Alam Group of Companies and worship leader at Christway Church in Najeera, Uganda.

Rukunya has represented Uganda in international squash competitions, most notably at the Commonwealth Games. He competed at the 2010 Commonwealth Games in New Delhi, India; the 2014 Commonwealth Games in Glasgow, Scotland; and the 2018 Commonwealth Games in Gold Coast, Australia. He was also part of Uganda’s national squash team for the 2022 Commonwealth Games in Birmingham, United Kingdom.

In addition to the Commonwealth Games, Rukunya has competed in several international tournaments and events. He has also played at the famed Prince Grand Prix Championship held in Johannesburg, South Africa.

== Awards ==
During his junior career, Rukunya won several junior squash championships and later achieved success in domestic and regional competitions. He performed strongly and won a number of tournaments, including the Castle Lite Championship, the Prime General Open, the Kabaka Cup, the Kabira Invitational, and the Kipepeo Open.

Rukunya also competed in tournaments outside Uganda, recording victories in several regional events. These included the Parklands Open, as well as competitions held in Nakuru and Mombasa in Kenya. He was also part of the winning side in the Mombasa Team Championships.

Rukunya is a three time (2016, 2018, 2019) Uganda Sports Press Association (USPA) squash player of the year.

== See also ==
- Micheal Kawooya
- Ramy Ashour
