= Papua New Guinea at the 2014 Commonwealth Games =

- CG code: PNG
- CGA: Papua New Guinea Olympic Committee
- Website: oceaniasport.com/png

in Glasgow, Scotland
- Flag bearer: Steven Kari
- Medals Ranked 16th: Gold 2 Silver 0 Bronze 0 Total 2

Commonwealth Games appearances (overview)
- 1962; 1966; 1970; 1974; 1978; 1982; 1986; 1990; 1994; 1998; 2002; 2006; 2010; 2014; 2018; 2022; 2026; 2030

Papua New Guinea competed in the 2014 Commonwealth Games in Glasgow, Scotland from 23 July to 3 August 2014. Papua New Guinea participated in the Commonwealth Games for the thirteenth time. Over its previous participations, its athletes won a total of nine medals, of which two gold. Swimmer Ryan Pini, Papua New Guinea's most successful competitor with a gold in 2006 and a silver in 2010, is not competing in Glasgow, but is present as "assistant coach and mentor" for PNG's swim team.

== Medalists ==
Medal	Name	Sport	Event	Date
Gold	Steven Kukuna Kari	Weightlifting	Men's 94 kg	July 29
Gold	Dika Toua	Weightlifting	Women's 53 kg	July 25

== Athletics ==
Key

- Note – Ranks given for track events are within the athlete's heat only
- Q = Qualified for the next round
- q = Qualified for the next round as a fastest loser or, in field events, by position without achieving the qualifying target
- NR = National record
- N/A = Round not applicable for the event

Men
Track & road events

Athlete	Event	Heat		Semifinal		Final	
Athlete	Event	Result	Rank	Result	Rank	Result	Rank
Kupun Wisil	100 m	10.86	50	did not advance			
Ruwan Gunasinghe	100 m	11.03	58	did not advance			
Nelson Stone	200 m	21.51	45	did not advance			
Nelson Stone	400 m	47.60	=31	did not advance			
Theo Piniau	200 m	21.77	48	did not advance			
Theo Piniau	400 m	48.50	36	did not advance			
Kaminiel Matlaun	400 m	48.65	37	did not advance			
Kaminiel Matlaun	800 m	1:52.36	20	did not advance			
Kevin Kapmatana	800 m	1:59.09	25	did not advance			
Veherney Babob	800 m	2:03.45	26	did not advance			
Andipas Georasi	1500 m	4:05.30	25	—N/a		did not advance	
Wala Gime	110 m hurdles	14.64	19	—N/a		did not advance	
Wala Gime	400 m hurdles	53.62	16	—N/a		did not advance	
Mowen Boino	400 m hurdles	DQ		—N/a		did not advance	

Women
Track & road events

Athlete	Event	Heat		Semifinal		Final	
Athlete	Event	Result	Rank	Result	Rank	Result	Rank
Helen Philemon	100 m	13.12	46	did not advance			
Toea Wisil	100 m	11.64 Q	=14	11.44 SB	10	did not advance	
Toea Wisil	200 m	24.26 q	21	24.48	21	did not advance	
Adrine Monagi	100 m	12.83	44	did not advance			
Adrine Monagi	200 m	26.71	40	did not advance			
Shirley Vunatup	200 m	25.79	34	did not advance			
Shirley Vunatup	400 m	1:00.10	42	did not advance			
Betty Burua	400 m	55.48	31	did not advance			
Donna Koniel	400 m	58.40	40	did not advance			
Donna Koniel	800 m	2:14.56	27	did not advance			
Sharon Kwarula	400 m hurdles	1:02.52	20	—N/a		did not advance	

== Judo ==
Men

Athlete	Event	Round of 32	Round of 16	Quarterfinals	Semifinals	Repechage	Final / BM	
Athlete	Event	Opposition Result	Opposition Result	Opposition Result	Opposition Result	Opposition Result	Opposition Result	Rank
Raymond Ovinou	−66 kg	Bye	Luzia (MOZ); L w/o	did not advance				
Nelson	−73 kg	Maxwell (BAR); W 100–000	Ganzo (KEN); L 0002–0023	did not advance				
Kinsley Vui	−73 kg	Kinyanjui (KEN); W 010-010	van Zyl (RSA); L 0001-1010	did not advance				

== Rugby sevens ==
Papua New Guinea has qualified a rugby sevens team.

Pool C

Team	Pld	W	D	L	PF	PA	PD	Pts	Qualification
Samoa	3	3	0	0	106	26	+80	9	Medal competition
Wales	3	2	0	1	93	26	+67	7	Medal competition
Papua New Guinea	3	1	0	2	57	69	−12	5	Bowl competition
Malaysia	3	0	0	3	7	142	−135	3	Bowl competition

26 July 2014
11:38

Samoa	33–14	Papua New Guinea
	Report

Ibrox Stadium, Glasgow

26 July 2014
14:18

Papua New Guinea	36–7	Malaysia
	Report

Ibrox Stadium, Glasgow

26 July 2014
18:46

Wales	29–7	Papua New Guinea
	Report

Ibrox Stadium, Glasgow

== Swimming ==
Men

Athlete	Event	Heat		Semifinal		Final	
Athlete	Event	Time	Rank	Time	Rank	Time	Rank
Collin Akara	50 m freestyle	26.22	54	did not advance			
Stanford Kawale	50 m freestyle	24.56	35	did not advance			
Collin Akara	100 m freestyle	59.18	56	did not advance			
Stanford Kawale	100 m freestyle	55.09	=40	did not advance			
Collin Akara	50 m butterfly	28.48	42	did not advance			
Stanford Kawale	50 m butterfly	26.39	31	did not advance			
Collin Akara	100 m butterfly	1:05.09	33	did not advance			
Stanford Kawale	100 m butterfly	1:00.67	28	did not advance			
Stanford Kawale	200 m individual medley	2:24.57	23	—N/a		did not advance	

Women

Athlete	Event	Heat		Semifinal		Final	
Athlete	Event	Time	Rank	Time	Rank	Time	Rank
Jocelyn Flynn	50 m freestyle	29.80	54	did not advance			
Savannah Tkatchenko	50 m freestyle	29.16	=46	did not advance			
Barbara Vali-Skelton	50 m freestyle	28.62	40	did not advance			
Jocelyn Flynn	100 m freestyle	1:07.17	44	did not advance			
Tegan McCarthy	50 m backstroke	33.74	33	did not advance			
Savannah Tkatchenko	50 m backstroke	33.01	28	did not advance			
Savannah Tkatchenko	100 m backstroke	1:14.90	26	did not advance			
Jocelyn Flynn	50 m breaststroke	36.44	30	did not advance			
Tegan McCarthy	50 m breaststroke	36.32	29	did not advance			
Barbara Vali-Skelton	50 m breaststroke	36.13	28	did not advance			
Tegan McCarthy	100 m breaststroke	1:18.52	30	did not advance			
Savannah Tkatchenko	100 m breaststroke	1:18.36	27	did not advance			
Barbara Vali-Skelton	100 m breaststroke	1:19.69	31	did not advance			
Jocelyn Flynn	200 m breaststroke	3:04.06	24	—N/a		did not advance	
Barbara Vali-Skelton	200 m breaststroke	2:54.39	22	—N/a		did not advance	
Tegan McCarthy	50 m butterfly	30.55	35	did not advance			
Savannah Tkatchenko	50 m butterfly	31.79	42	did not advance			
Tegan McCarthy	100 m butterfly	1:10.20	27	did not advance			
Jocelyn Flynn; Tegan McCarthy; Savannah Tkatchenko; Barbara Vali-Skelton	4 × 100 m freestyle relay	4:25.01	10	—N/a		did not advance	
Jocelyn Flynn; Tegan McCarthy; Savannah Tkatchenko; Barbara Vali-Skelton	4 × 100 m medley relay	4:49.04	9	—N/a		did not advance	

== Triathlon ==
Athlete	Event	Swim (1.5 km)	Bike (40 km)	Run (10 km)	Total Time	Rank
Casmer Kamangip	Men's	28:13	Lapped			
Polihau Popeliau	Men's	did not finish				
Rachael Sapera James	Women's	Lapped				

== Weightlifting ==
Men

Athlete	Event	Snatch	Clean & Jerk	Total	Rank
Fred Oala	56 kg	85	118	203	8
Morea Baru	62 kg	120	150	270	4
Toua Udia	77 kg	125	163	288	9
Steven Kukuna Kari	94 kg	149	200	349	1st place, gold medalist(s)

Women

Athlete	Event	Snatch	Clean & Jerk	Total	Rank
Dika Toua	53 kg	82	111	193 GR	1st place, gold medalist(s)
Sandra Ako	69 kg	85	106	191	7
Guba Hale	69 kg	85	110	195	6

Powerlifting

Athlete	Event	Total	Rank
Pope Gazave	Men's 72 kg	161.9	6
Ziggy Satkurin	Men's 72 kg	151.1	7
Timothy Harabe	Men's +72 kg	did not finish	
