= Joe Chapman (squash player) =

Squash player

- Full name: Joseph S. Chapman
- Country: British Virgin Islands
- Born: 22 July 1990 (age 35); Bristol, United Kingdom

Joseph S. Chapman (born 22 July 1990 in Bristol, United Kingdom) is a squash player who represents the British Virgin Islands in regional Games as well as at the CAC Games and Commonwealth Games Melbourne 2006, Delhi 2010, Glasgow 2014 and Gold Coast 2018. In Melbourne 2006 he became the youngest player to compete in squash. In Delhi 2010 he was the nation's flag-bearer. In Gold Coast he won the plate competition by beating Cayman Islands Cameron Stafford in the finals.

Chapman is the son of Mark and Heather Chapman. He attended The University of Rochester studying Economics and completed in NCAA Division 1 squash for the Yellowjackets.

Chapman has been the No. 1 ranked player in the BVI since 2006.

At Delhi 2010 he faced world #16 Cameron Pilley in the first round and lost 5-11, 9-11, 0-11.

== Hurricane Irma ==
Chapman has talked about the transformative experience of Hurricane Irma on his worldview, stating in an interview with Guy Spier, " "incredibly devastating to have your properties damaged..but not only that, the country was destroyed."
