= Swimming at the 2014 Commonwealth Games – Men's 50 metre breaststroke =

Men's 50 metre breaststroke at the 2014 Commonwealth Games
- Venue: Tollcross International Swimming Centre
- Dates: 27 July 2014 (heats & semis); 28 July 2014 (final)
- Competitors: 38 from 27 nations
- Winning time: 26.76 GR

Medalists
gold medal	Cameron van der Burgh	South Africa
silver medal	Adam Peaty	England
bronze medal	Christian Sprenger	Australia

The men's 50 metre breaststroke event at the 2014 Commonwealth Games, as part of the swimming programme, took place on 27 and 28 July at the Tollcross International Swimming Centre in Glasgow, Scotland.

The medals were presented by Dr. Sharad Rao, Honorary Legal Advisor of the Commonwealth Games Federation and the quaichs were presented by Prof. Lorne Crerar, Chairman of Harper Macleod.

== Records ==
Prior to this competition, the existing world and Commonwealth Games records were as follows.

World record	Cameron van der Burgh (RSA)	26.67	Rome, Italy	29 July 2009
Commonwealth record	Cameron van der Burgh (RSA)	26.67	Rome, Italy	29 July 2009
Games record	Cameron van der Burgh (RSA)	27.18	Delhi, India	8 October 2010

The following records were established during the competition:

Date	Event	Name	Nationality	Time	Record
27 July	Heat	Adam Peaty	England	27.00	GR
27 July	Semifinal	Cameron van der Burgh	South Africa	26.80	GR
28 July	Final	Cameron van der Burgh	South Africa	26.76	GR

== Results ==
=== Heats ===
Rank	Heat	Lane	Name	Nationality	Time	Notes
1	4	5	Adam Peaty	England	27.00	Q, GR
2	4	4	Cameron van der Burgh	South Africa	27.39	Q
3	5	5	Ross Murdoch	Scotland	27.44	Q
4	3	4	Glenn Snyders	New Zealand	27.45	Q
5	5	4	Christian Sprenger	Australia	27.57	Q
6	3	5	Mark Tully	Scotland	27.77	Q
7	4	3	Joe Welstead	Scotland	27.90	Q
8	5	6	Robert Holderness	Wales	27.93	Q
9	5	3	Richard Funk	Canada	28.02	Q
10	3	3	Sandeep Sejwal	India	28.17	Q
11	4	6	James Wilby	England	28.36	Q
12	5	2	Bradley Tandy	South Africa	28.57	Q
13	3	6	Ian Black	Jersey	28.64	Q
14	5	7	Michael Dawson	Northern Ireland	28.92	Q
15	4	7	Dustin Tynes	Bahamas	29.08	Q
16	3	2	Kenneth To	Australia	29.17	Q
17	4	2	Shaun Yap	Malaysia	29.60	
18	4	1	Meli Malani	Fiji	29.87	
=19	3	7	David Ebanks	Cayman Islands	30.04	
=19	5	8	Luke Belton	Guernsey	30.04	
21	4	8	Micah Fernandes	Kenya	30.08	
22	3	8	Alexandros Axiotis	Zambia	30.25	
23	2	5	Guy Davies	Isle of Man	30.28	
24	5	1	Christopher Cheong	Singapore	30.50	
25	3	1	Thomas Hollingsworth	Guernsey	30.64	
26	2	4	Tory Pragassa	Kenya	30.73	
27	2	6	Corey Ollivierre	Grenada	31.12	
28	2	7	Kyle Dougan	Saint Vincent and the Grenadines	31.16	
29	2	3	Colin Bensadon	Gibraltar	31.90	
30	1	4	Matthew Shone	Zambia	32.08	
31	1	6	Andrew Hopkin	Grenada	32.89	
32	2	2	Nikolas Sylvester	Saint Vincent and the Grenadines	33.49	
33	2	1	J'air Smith	Antigua and Barbuda	33.62	
34	2	8	Joshua Tibatemwa	Uganda	33.72	
35	1	5	Mark Hoare	Swaziland	33.77	
36	1	2	Shane Cadogan	Saint Vincent and the Grenadines	34.00	
37	1	7	Patrick Rukundo	Rwanda	34.33	
	1	3	Shakil Fakir	Mozambique		DNS

=== Semifinals ===
Rank	Heat	Lane	Name	Nationality	Time	Notes
1	1	4	Cameron van der Burgh	South Africa	26.80	Q, GR
2	2	4	Adam Peaty	England	26.99	Q
3	2	3	Christian Sprenger	Australia	27.11	Q
4	1	3	Mark Tully	Scotland	27.37	Q
5	2	5	Ross Murdoch	Scotland	27.41	Q
6	1	5	Glenn Snyders	New Zealand	27.43	Q
7	2	6	Joe Welstead	Scotland	27.73	Q
8	2	2	Richard Funk	Canada	27.93	Q
9	1	2	Sandeep Sejwal	India	28.12	
10	1	6	Robert Holderness	Wales	28.26	
11	2	7	James Wilby	England	28.60	
=12	1	1	Michael Dawson	Northern Ireland	28.87	
=12	2	1	Ian Black	Jersey	28.87	
14	1	8	Kenneth To	Australia	29.33	
15	2	8	Dustin Tynes	Bahamas	29.53	
	1	7	Bradley Tandy	South Africa		DSQ

=== Final ===
Rank	Lane	Name	Nationality	Time	Notes
1st place, gold medalist(s)	4	Cameron van der Burgh	South Africa	26.76	GR
2nd place, silver medalist(s)	5	Adam Peaty	England	26.78	
3rd place, bronze medalist(s)	3	Christian Sprenger	Australia	27.46	
4	6	Mark Tully	Scotland	27.47	
5	7	Glenn Snyders	New Zealand	27.53	
6	2	Ross Murdoch	Scotland	27.65	
7	1	Joe Welstead	Scotland	27.99	
8	8	Richard Funk	Canada	28.21	
