= Swimming at the 2014 Commonwealth Games – Men's 100 metre breaststroke =

Men's 100 metre breaststroke at the 2014 Commonwealth Games
- Venue: Tollcross International Swimming Centre
- Dates: 25 July 2014 (heats & semis); 26 July 2014 (final)
- Competitors: 34 from 24 nations
- Winning time: 58.94 GR

Medalists
gold medal	Adam Peaty	England
silver medal	Cameron van der Burgh	South Africa
bronze medal	Ross Murdoch	Scotland

The men's 100 metre breaststroke event at the 2014 Commonwealth Games as part of the swimming programme took place on 25 and 26 July at the Tollcross International Swimming Centre in Glasgow, Scotland.

The medals were presented by David Wilkie, Olympic, World and Commonwealth champion and the quaichs were presented by Dursley Stott, Honorary President of the Commonwealth Games Association of the Isle of Man. Adam Peaty of England won the Commonwealth title, just ahead of South Africa's Olympic champion and world record holder Cameron van der Burgh, with 200 metre breaststroke Commonwealth champion Ross Murdoch of Scotland third. The same three athletes finished in the same three positions in the event at the 2015 World Aquatics Championships.

== Records ==
Prior to this competition, the existing world and Commonwealth Games records were as follows.

World record	Cameron van der Burgh (RSA)	58.46	London, United Kingdom	29 July 2012
Commonwealth record	Cameron van der Burgh (RSA)	58.46	London, United Kingdom	29 July 2012
Games record	Cameron van der Burgh (RSA)	1:00.10	Delhi, India	6 October 2010

The following records were established during the competition:

Date	Event	Name	Nationality	Time	Record
25 July	Heat	Adam Peaty	England	59.47	GR
25 July	Semifinal	Adam Peaty	England	59.16	GR
26 July	Final	Adam Peaty	England	58.94	GR

== Results ==
=== Heats ===
Rank	Heat	Lane	Name	Nationality	Time	Notes
1	5	5	Adam Peaty	England	59.47	Q, GR
2	3	4	Ross Murdoch	Scotland	1:00.63	Q
3	4	5	Glenn Snyders	New Zealand	1:00.75	Q
4	4	4	Cameron van der Burgh	South Africa	1:00.99	Q
5	3	3	Richard Funk	Canada	1:01.25	Q
6	5	3	Craig Benson	Scotland	1:01.30	Q
7	4	3	James Wilby	England	1:01.40	Q
8	4	6	Andrew Willis	England	1:01.48	Q
9	5	6	Robert Holderness	Wales	1:01.52	Q
10	3	5	Michael Jamieson	Scotland	1:01.98	Q
11	5	4	Christian Sprenger	Australia	1:02.30	Q
12	3	6	Sandeep Sejwal	India	1:02.97	Q
13	3	2	Michael Dawson	Northern Ireland	1:04.37	Q
14	4	7	Dustin Tynes	Bahamas	1:04.42	Q
15	5	7	Ian Black	Jersey	1:04.43	Q
16	5	1	Julian Fletcher	Bermuda	1:04.92	Q
17	5	2	Christopher Cheong	Singapore	1:05.14	
18	5	8	Luke Belton	Guernsey	1:05.17	
19	4	1	Thomas Hollingsworth	Guernsey	1:05.73	
20	3	1	Guy Davies	Isle of Man	1:05.92	
21	4	8	Alexandros Axiotis	Zambia	1:06.03	
22	4	2	Shaun Yap	Malaysia	1:06.49	
23	3	7	Micah Fernandes	Kenya	1:07.09	
24	2	4	Ralph Goveia	Zambia	1:07.54	
25	2	5	David Ebanks	Cayman Islands	1:08.36	
26	2	3	Tory Pragassa	Kenya	1:09.26	
27	2	6	Corey Ollivierre	Grenada	1:09.39	
28	2	1	Matthew Shone	Zambia	1:10.71	
29	3	8	Colin Bensadon	Gibraltar	1:11.55	
30	2	7	Nikolas Sylvester	Saint Vincent and the Grenadines	1:12.80	
31	2	2	Joshua Tibatemwa	Uganda	1:16.49	
32	1	4	Mark Hoare	Swaziland	1:17.08	
33	1	5	Shane Cadogan	Saint Vincent and the Grenadines	1:18.29	
34	1	3	Storm Halbich	Saint Vincent and the Grenadines	1:20.24	

=== Semifinals ===
Rank	Heat	Lane	Name	Nationality	Time	Notes
1	2	4	Adam Peaty	England	59.16	Q, GR
2	1	4	Ross Murdoch	Scotland	59.72	Q
3	1	5	Cameron van der Burgh	South Africa	59.91	Q
4	2	5	Glenn Snyders	New Zealand	59.98	Q
5	1	3	Craig Benson	Scotland	1:00.40	Q
6	2	3	Richard Funk	Canada	1:00.51	Q
7	2	2	Robert Holderness	Wales	1:00.71	Q
8	2	6	James Wilby	England	1:00.94	Q
9	1	6	Andrew Willis	England	1:01.35	
10	2	7	Christian Sprenger	Australia	1:01.73	
11	1	2	Michael Jamieson	Scotland	1:02.04	
12	1	7	Sandeep Sejwal	India	1:03.24	
13	1	1	Dustin Tynes	Bahamas	1:03.39	
14	2	8	Ian Black	Jersey	1:04.00	
15	1	8	Julian Fletcher	Bermuda	1:04.48	
16	2	1	Michael Dawson	Northern Ireland	1:04.65	

=== Final ===
Rank	Lane	Name	Nationality	Time	Notes
1st place, gold medalist(s)	4	Adam Peaty	England	58.94	GR
2nd place, silver medalist(s)	3	Cameron van der Burgh	South Africa	59.28	
3rd place, bronze medalist(s)	5	Ross Murdoch	Scotland	59.47	
4	2	Craig Benson	Scotland	1:00.44	
5	6	Glenn Snyders	New Zealand	1:00.64	
6	7	Richard Funk	Canada	1:00.75	
7	8	James Wilby	England	1:01.07	
	1	Robert Holderness	Wales		DSQ
