= Saint Vincent and the Grenadines at the 2014 Commonwealth Games =

- CGF code: SVG
- CGA: Saint Vincent and the Grenadines National Olympic Committee
- Website: svgnoc.org

in Glasgow, Scotland
- Competitors: 26 in 5 sports
- Flag bearer: Kineke Alexander
- Medals: Gold 0 Silver 0 Bronze 0 Total 0

Commonwealth Games appearances (overview)
- 1958; 1962; 1966; 1970; 1974; 1978; 1982–1990; 1994; 1998; 2002; 2006; 2010; 2014; 2018; 2022; 2026; 2030

Saint Vincent and the Grenadines competed in the 2014 Commonwealth Games in Glasgow, Scotland from 23 July to 3 August 2014.

== Athletics ==
Men
Track & road events

Athlete	Event	Heat		Semifinal		Final	
Athlete	Event	Result	Rank	Result	Rank	Result	Rank
Josh Hamilton	100 m	10.85	48	Did not advance			
Kimorie Shearman	100 m	11.04	59	Did not advance			
Kimorie Shearman	200 m	21.85	50	Did not advance			
Courtney Williams	100 m	10.95	54	Did not advance			
Courtney Williams	200 m	21.94	56	Did not advance			
Reuberth Boyd	200 m	22.23	60	Did not advance			
Brandon Valentine-Paris	400 m	50.90	44	Did not advance			
Deonne Nicol-Samuel	1500 m	3:58.40	24	—		Did not advance	
Reuberth Boyde; Josh Hamilton; Kimorie Shearman; Brandon Valentine-Paris; Courtney Williams	4x100 m relay	40.47	11	—		Did not advance	

Women
Track & road events

Athlete	Event	Heat		Semifinal		Final	
Athlete	Event	Result	Rank	Result	Rank	Result	Rank
Kineke Alexander	200 m	23.44	10 Q	23.58	14	Did not advance	
Kineke Alexander	400 m	52.98	9 Q	52.12	7 q	52.78	6

Key

- Note–Ranks given for track events are within the athlete's heat only
- Q = Qualified for the next round
- q = Qualified for the next round as a fastest loser or, in field events, by position without achieving the qualifying target
- NR = National record
- N/A = Round not applicable for the event

== Cycling ==
=== Road ===
Men

Athlete	Event	Time	Rank
Cammie Adams	Road race	DNF	
Orano Andrews	Road race	DNF	

== Squash ==
Individual

Athlete	Event	Round of 128	Round of 64	Round of 32	Round of 16	Quarterfinals	Semifinals	Final	Rank
Athlete	Event	Opposition Score	Opposition Score	Opposition Score	Opposition Score	Opposition Score	Opposition Score	Opposition Score	Rank
Othniel Bailey	Men's Singles	Tewkesbury (GIB); W 3 – 2	Taylor (JER); L 3 – 0	Did not advance					
Kevin Hannaway	Men's Singles	Bye	Clyne (JAM); L 3 – 0	Did not advance					
Jules Snagg	Men's Singles	Bye	Ghosal (IND); L 3 – 0	Did not advance					

Doubles

Athlete	Event	Group stage				Round of 16	Quarterfinal	Semifinal	Final	Rank
Athlete	Event	Opposition Score	Opposition Score	Opposition Score	Rank	Opposition Score	Opposition Score	Opposition Score	Opposition Score	Rank
James Bentick; Kevin Hannaway	Men's doubles	Scotland; L 0 - 2	Papua New Guinea; W 2 - 0	Malaysia; L 0 - 2	3	Did not advance				
Othniel Bailey; Jason Doyle	Men's doubles	Zambia; L 0 - 2	Gibraltar; W 2 - 1	England; L 0 - 2	3	Did not advance				

== Swimming ==
Men

Athlete	Event	Heat		Semifinal		Final	
Athlete	Event	Time	Rank	Time	Rank	Time	Rank
Shane Cadogan	50 m freestyle	28.41	68	Did not advance			
Storm Halbich	50 m freestyle	27.78	67	Did not advance			
Nikolas Sylvester	50 m freestyle	26.64	59	Did not advance			
Dillon Gooding	100 m freestyle	1:01.93	61	Did not advance			
Storm Halbich	100 m freestyle	1:01.90	60	Did not advance			
Nikolas Sylvester	100 m freestyle	59.43	57	Did not advance			
Dillon Gooding	50 m backstroke	32.64	36	Did not advance			
Storm Halbich	50 m backstroke	31.80	33	Did not advance			
Nikolas Sylvester	50 m backstroke	32.28	35	Did not advance			
Shane Cadogan	50 m breaststroke	34.00	36	Did not advance			
Kyle Dougan	50 m breaststroke	31.16	28	Did not advance			
Nikolas Sylvester	50 m breaststroke	33.49	32	Did not advance			
Shane Cadogan	100 m breaststroke	1:18.29	33	Did not advance			
Storm Halbich	100 m breaststroke	1:20.24	34	Did not advance			
Nikolas Sylvester	100 m breaststroke	1:12.80	30	Did not advance			
Dillon Gooding	50 m butterfly	30.62	48	Did not advance			
Storm Halbich	50 m butterfly	31.09	49	Did not advance			
Nikolas Sylvester	50 m butterfly	29.03	46	Did not advance			
Dillon Gooding	100 m butterfly	1:11.86	37	Did not advance			

Women

Athlete	Event	Heat		Semifinal		Final	
Athlete	Event	Time	Rank	Time	Rank	Time	Rank
Izzy Joachim	50 m freestyle	27.30	24	Did not advance			
Adora Lawrence	50 m freestyle	31.23	56	Did not advance			
Izzy Joachim	50 m backstroke	33.52	31	Did not advance			
Izzy Joachim	50 m breaststroke	34.80	22	Did not advance			
Izzy Joachim	100 m breaststroke	1:18.37	=28	Did not advance			
Izzy Joachim	200 m breaststroke	DNS		—		Did not advance	
Izzy Joachim	50 m butterfly	30.10	32	Did not advance			

== Table Tennis ==
Singles

Athlete	Event	Group stage			Round of 64	Round of 32	Round of 16	Quarterfinals	Semifinals	Final	Rank
Athlete	Event	Opposition Result	Opposition Result	Rank	Opposition Result	Opposition Result	Opposition Result	Opposition Result	Opposition Result	Opposition Result	Rank
Javier de Shong	Men's Singles	Yogarajah (MRI); L 0 - 4	Somba (MAW); L 0 - 4	3	Did not advance						
Kavir Gaymes Jr	Men's Singles	Tumaini (TAN); L 1 - 4	Doherty (SCO); L 0 - 4	3	Did not advance						
Romano Spencer	Men's Singles	Loi (PNG); W 4 - 1	Ho (CAN); L 0 - 4	2	Did not advance						
Unica Velox	Women's Singles	Loi (PNG); W 4 - 1	Edem (NGR); L 0 - 4	2	Did not advance						

Doubles

Athlete	Event	Round of 128	Round of 64	Round of 32	Round of 16	Quarterfinals	Semifinals	Final	Rank
Athlete	Event	Opposition Result	Opposition Result	Opposition Result	Opposition Result	Opposition Result	Opposition Result	Opposition Result	Rank
Javier de Shong; Sean Stanley	Men's Doubles	—	Saint Lucia; L 0 - 3	Did not advance					
Kavir Gaymes Jr; Romano Spencer	Men's Doubles	—	Kenya; L 0 - 3	Did not advance					
Unica Velox; Romano Spencer	Mixed Doubles	Dominica; W 3 - 0	Malaysia; L 0 - 3	Did not advance					
