= Swimming at the 2014 Commonwealth Games – Men's 200 metre breaststroke =

Men's 200 metre breaststroke at the 2014 Commonwealth Games
- Venue: Tollcross International Swimming Centre
- Dates: 24 July 2014
- Competitors: 22 from 15 nations
- Winning time: 2:07.30 GR

Medalists
| gold medal | Ross Murdoch | Scotland |
| silver medal | Michael Jamieson | Scotland |
| bronze medal | Andrew Willis | England |

The men's 200 metre breaststroke event at the 2014 Commonwealth Games as part of the swimming programme took place on 24 July at the Tollcross International Swimming Centre in Glasgow, Scotland.

The medals were presented by Michael Cavanagh, Chairman of Commonwealth Games Scotland and the quaichs were presented by Louise Martin, Honorary Secretary of the Commonwealth Games Federation, Immediate Past Chair of Commonwealth Games Scotland and Vice-Chair of Glasgow 2014.

== Records ==
Prior to this competition, the existing world and Commonwealth Games records were as follows.

| World record | Akihiro Yamaguchi (JPN) | 2:07.01 | Gifu, Japan | 15 September 2012 |
| Commonwealth record | Christian Sprenger (AUS) | 2:07.31 | Rome, Italy | 30 July 2009 |
| Games record | Brenton Rickard (AUS) | 2:10.89 | Delhi, India | 9 October 2010 |

The following records were established during the competition:

| Date | Event | Name | Nationality | Time | Record |
|---|---|---|---|---|---|
| 24 July | Heat | Andrew Willis | England | 2:10.50 | GR |
| 24 July | Heat | Ross Murdoch | Scotland | 2:08.78 | GR |
| 24 July | Final | Ross Murdoch | Scotland | 2:07.30 | GR |

== Results ==
=== Heats ===
| Rank | Heat | Lane | Name | Nationality | Time | Notes |
|---|---|---|---|---|---|---|
| 1 | 3 | 5 | Ross Murdoch | Scotland | 2:08.78 | Q, GR |
| 2 | 3 | 4 | Michael Jamieson | Scotland | 2:10.17 | Q |
| 3 | 3 | 3 | Calum Tait | Scotland | 2:10.33 | Q |
| 4 | 2 | 4 | Andrew Willis | England | 2:10.50 | Q |
| 5 | 2 | 5 | Adam Peaty | England | 2:10.80 | Q |
| 6 | 1 | 3 | James Wilby | England | 2:11.62 | Q |
| 7 | 1 | 5 | Robert Holderness | Wales | 2:11.70 | Q |
| 8 | 1 | 4 | Christian Sprenger | Australia | 2:11.96 | Q |
| 9 | 2 | 3 | Glenn Snyders | New Zealand | 2:12.16 | |
| 10 | 2 | 6 | Richard Funk | Canada | 2:12.56 | |
| 11 | 1 | 6 | Evan White | Canada | 2:15.86 | |
| 12 | 3 | 7 | Guy Davies | Isle of Man | 2:19.72 | |
| 13 | 2 | 7 | Luke Belton | Guernsey | 2:21.28 | |
| 14 | 1 | 7 | Thomas Hollingsworth | Guernsey | 2:22.38 | |
| 15 | 2 | 2 | Dustin Tynes | Bahamas | 2:22.90 | |
| 16 | 1 | 2 | Micah Fernandes | Kenya | 2:24.15 | |
| 17 | 3 | 2 | Christopher Cheong | Singapore | 2:24.41 | |
| 18 | 3 | 1 | Colin Bensadon | Gibraltar | 2:35.61 | |
| 19 | 2 | 1 | Brandon Schuster | Samoa | 2:36.73 | |
| 20 | 1 | 1 | Corey Ollivierre | Grenada | 2:43.17 | |
| 21 | 3 | 8 | Ntseke Setho | Lesotho | 3:05.18 | |
| | 3 | 6 | Daniel Tranter | Australia | | DNS |

=== Final ===
| Rank | Lane | Name | Nationality | Time | Notes |
|---|---|---|---|---|---|
| 1st place, gold medalist(s) | 4 | Ross Murdoch | Scotland | 2:07.30 | CR |
| 2nd place, silver medalist(s) | 5 | Michael Jamieson | Scotland | 2:08.40 | |
| 3rd place, bronze medalist(s) | 6 | Andrew Willis | England | 2:09.87 | |
| 4 | 2 | Adam Peaty | England | 2:10.02 | |
| 5 | 3 | Calum Tait | Scotland | 2:10.21 | |
| 6 | 7 | James Wilby | England | 2:11.53 | |
| 7 | 1 | Robert Holderness | Wales | 2:12.35 | |
| 8 | 8 | Christian Sprenger | Australia | 2:12.69 | |
