= Swimming at the 2015 Pan American Games – Men's 100 metre breaststroke =

Men's 100 metre breaststroke at the 2015 Pan American Games
- Venue: CIBC Pan Am/Parapan Am Aquatics Centre and Field House
- Dates: July 17 (preliminaries and finals)
- Competitors: 20 from 17 nations
- Winning time: 59.21

Medalists
Gold medal	Felipe França Silva	Brazil
Silver medal	Felipe Lima	Brazil
Bronze medal	Richard Funk	Canada

The men's 100 metre breaststroke competition of the swimming events at the 2015 Pan American Games took place on July 17 at the CIBC Pan Am/Parapan Am Aquatics Centre and Field House in Toronto, Canada. The defending Pan American Games champion was Felipe França Silva of Brazil.

This race consisted of two lengths of the pool, all lengths in breaststroke. The top eight swimmers from the heats would qualify for the A final (where the medals would be awarded), while the next best eight swimmers would qualify for the B final.

== Records ==
Prior to this competition, the existing world and Pan American Games records were as follows:

World record	Adam Peaty (GBR)	57.92	London, United Kingdom	April 17, 2015
Pan American Games record	Mark Gangloff (USA)	1:00.24	Rio de Janeiro, Brazil	July 17, 2007

The following new records were set during this competition.

Date	Event	Name	Nationality	Time	Record
17 July	Heats	Felipe França Silva	Brazil	59.84	GR
17 July	A Final	Felipe França Silva	Brazil	59.21	GR

== Qualification ==
Each National Olympic Committee (NOC) was able to enter up to two entrants providing they had met the A standard (1:02.79) in the qualifying period (January 1, 2014 to May 1, 2015). NOCs were also permitted to enter one athlete providing they had met the B standard (1:06.56) in the same qualifying period. All other competing athletes were entered as universality spots.

== Schedule ==
All times are Eastern Time Zone (UTC-4).

Date	Time	Round
July 17, 2015	11:22	Heats
July 17, 2015	20:41	Final B
July 17, 2015	20:46	Final A

== Results ==
KEY:	q	Fastest non-qualifiers	Q	Qualified	GR	Games record	NR	National record	PB	Personal best	SB	Seasonal best

=== Heats ===
The first round was held on July 15.

Rank	Heat	Lane	Name	Nationality	Time	Notes
1	2	4	Felipe França Silva	Brazil	59.84	QA, GR
2	3	3	Jorge Murillo	Colombia	1:00.53	QA, NR
3	3	4	Felipe Lima	Brazil	1:00.57	QA
4	1	4	Richard Funk	Canada	1:00.80	QA
5	3	5	Brad Craig	United States	1:01.29	QB
6	2	5	B.J. Johnson	United States	1:01.61	QA
7	1	3	Miguel De Lara	Mexico	1:01.85	QA
8	2	6	Édgar Crespo	Panama	1:02.01	QA
9	1	5	Carlos Claverie	Venezuela	1:02.02	QB
10	3	6	Facundo Miguelena	Argentina	1:03.03	QB
11	2	2	Dustin Tynes	Bahamas	1:03.15	QB
12	2	3	James Dergousoff	Canada	1:03.28	QB
13	1	6	Renato Prono	Paraguay	1:03.75	QB
14	1	2	Julian Fletcher	Bermuda	1:03.87	QB
15	3	7	Jordy Groters	Aruba	1:03.92	QB
16	3	2	Martin Melconian	Uruguay	1:04.26	QB
17	1	7	Rafael Alfaro	El Salvador	1:05.50	
18	2	7	Gerardo Huidobro	Peru	1:08.27	
19	3	1	Corey Ollivierre	Grenada	1:10.96	
20	2	1	Nikolas Sylvester	Saint Vincent and the Grenadines	1:11.94	

=== B Final ===
The B final was also held on July 17.

Rank	Lane	Name	Nationality	Time	Notes
9	4	Carlos Claverie	Venezuela	1:02.46	
10	3	Dustin Tynes	Bahamas	1:02.49	
11	6	James Dergousoff	Canada	1:02.57	
12	5	Facundo Miguelena	Argentina	1:03.55	
13	7	Julian Fletcher	Bermuda	1:03.60	
14	1	Jordy Groters	Aruba	1:03.97	
15	2	Renato Prono	Paraguay	1:04.57	
16	8	Martin Melconian	Uruguay	1:04.95	

=== A Final ===
The A final was also held on July 15.

Rank	Lane	Name	Nationality	Time	Notes
1st place, gold medalist(s)	4	Felipe França Silva	Brazil	59.21	GR
2nd place, silver medalist(s)	3	Felipe Lima	Brazil	1:00.01	
3rd place, bronze medalist(s)	6	Richard Funk	Canada	1:00.29	
4	5	Jorge Murillo	Colombia	1:00.61	
5	2	Brad Craig	United States	1:01.34	
6	1	Miguel De Lara	Mexico	1:01.42	NR
7	7	B.J. Johnson	United States	1:01.77	
8	8	Édgar Crespo	Panama	1:01.88	
