= Swimming at the 2014 Commonwealth Games – Men's 50 metre butterfly =

Men's 50 metre butterfly at the 2014 Commonwealth Games
- Venue: Tollcross International Swimming Centre
- Dates: 24 July 2014 (heats & semis); 25 July 2014 (final)
- Competitors: 50 from 32 nations
- Winning time: 22.93 GR

Medalists
gold medal	Benjamin Proud	England
silver medal	Roland Schoeman	South Africa
bronze medal	Chad le Clos	South Africa

The men's 50 metre butterfly event at the 2014 Commonwealth Games as part of the swimming programme took place on 24 and 25 July at the Tollcross International Swimming Centre in Glasgow, Scotland.

The medals were presented by Agnes Tjongarero, President of Namibian National Olympic Committee and the quaichs were presented by Raymond Williamson, Lord Dean of Guild of Glasgow.

== Records ==
Prior to this competition, the existing world and Commonwealth Games records were as follows.

World record	Rafael Muñoz (ESP)	22.43	Málaga, Spain	5 April 2009
Commonwealth record	Matthew Targett (AUS)	22.73	Rome, Italy	27 July 2009
Games record	Roland Schoeman (RSA)	23.14	Melbourne, Australia	17 March 2006

The following records were established during the competition:

Date	Event	Name	Nationality	Time	Record
25 July	Final	Benjamin Proud	England	22.93	GR

== Results ==
=== Heats ===
Rank	Heat	Lane	Name	Nationality	Time	Notes
1	6	4	Benjamin Proud	England	23.17	Q
2	5	6	Joseph Schooling	Singapore	23.43	Q, NR
3	5	4	Chad le Clos	South Africa	23.65	Q
4	5	5	Adam Barrett	England	23.68	Q
5	6	6	Jason Dunford	Kenya	23.76	Q
6	7	4	Roland Schoeman	South Africa	23.85	Q
7	6	5	Jayden Hadler	Australia	23.87	Q
8	6	3	Chris Wright	Australia	23.91	Q
9	7	2	Brett Fraser	Cayman Islands	24.01	Q
10	7	6	Coleman Allen	Canada	24.25	Q
11	5	3	Tom Laxton	Wales	24.28	Q
12	7	5	Kenneth To	Australia	24.50	Q
13	6	2	Gamal Assaad	Canada	24.66	Q
14	7	3	Elvis Burrows	Bahamas	24.83	Q
=15	5	2	Alexandre Bakhtiarov	Cyprus	25.16	Q
=15	7	8	Miles Munro	Guernsey	25.16	Q
17	3	5	Tom Gallichan	Jersey	25.34	
18	7	1	Ralph Goveia	Zambia	25.35	
19	7	7	Ifalemi Sau-Paea	Tonga	25.40	
20	4	5	Conor Munn	Northern Ireland	25.57	
21	6	7	Curtis Coulter	Northern Ireland	25.73	
=22	5	1	Bradley Vincent	Mauritius	25.79	
=22	6	8	Timothy Wynter	Jamaica	25.79	
24	5	7	Cherantha de Silva	Sri Lanka	25.86	
25	4	4	Meli Malani	Fiji	25.90	
26	4	3	Issa Mohamed	Kenya	26.00	
27	5	8	Joshua Daniel	Saint Lucia	26.04	
28	6	1	Thomas Hollingsworth	Guernsey	26.22	
29	4	6	Xander Beaton	Guernsey	26.53	
30	4	1	Adam Viktora	Seychelles	26.86	
31	3	7	Stanford Kawale	Papua New Guinea	26.93	
32	3	4	James Sanderson	Gibraltar	27.10	NR
33	2	5	Abeiku Jackson	Ghana	27.21	
34	3	1	Hilal Hemed Hilal	Tanzania	27.28	
35	3	2	Sikandar Khan	Pakistan	27.35	
36	3	3	Emidio Cuna	Mozambique	27.44	
37	3	6	Milimo Mweetwa	Zambia	27.70	
38	4	7	Nishwan Ibrahim	Maldives	27.79	
39	2	3	Kwaku Addo	Ghana	27.80	
40	1	4	Ammaar Ghadiyali	Tanzania	28.11	
41	3	8	Chris Regis	Grenada	28.35	
42	2	4	Collin Akara	Papua New Guinea	28.48	
43	2	7	Arnold Kisulo	Uganda	28.61	
44	2	6	Corey Ollivierre	Grenada	28.72	
45	4	8	Haris Bandey	Pakistan	28.91	
46	2	2	Nikolas Sylvester	Saint Vincent and the Grenadines	29.03	
47	4	2	Mohamed Adnan	Maldives	29.46	
48	1	5	Dillon Gooding	Saint Vincent and the Grenadines	30.62	
49	1	3	Storm Halbich	Saint Vincent and the Grenadines	31.09	
50	2	1	Patrick Rukundo	Rwanda	31.46	

=== Semifinals ===
Rank	Heat	Lane	Name	Nationality	Time	Notes
1	2	4	Benjamin Proud	England	23.16	Q
2	1	3	Roland Schoeman	South Africa	23.25	Q
3	2	5	Chad le Clos	South Africa	23.29	Q
4	1	5	Adam Barrett	England	23.41	Q
5	1	4	Joseph Schooling	Singapore	23.48	Q
6	2	6	Jayden Hadler	Australia	23.67	Q
7	1	6	Chris Wright	Australia	23.78	Q
8	2	2	Brett Fraser	Cayman Islands	23.96	Q
9	2	3	Jason Dunford	Kenya	24.03	
10	1	2	Coleman Allen	Canada	24.25	
11	1	7	Kenneth To	Australia	24.26	
12	2	7	Tom Laxton	Wales	24.31	
13	1	8	Miles Munro	Guernsey	24.49	
14	1	1	Elvis Burrows	Bahamas	24.74	
15	2	1	Gamal Assaad	Canada	24.75	
16	2	8	Alexandre Bakhtiarov	Cyprus	24.95	

=== Final ===
Rank	Lane	Name	Nationality	Time	Notes
1st place, gold medalist(s)	4	Benjamin Proud	England	22.93	GR
2nd place, silver medalist(s)	5	Roland Schoeman	South Africa	23.13	
3rd place, bronze medalist(s)	3	Chad le Clos	South Africa	23.36	
4	6	Adam Barrett	England	23.43	
5	8	Brett Fraser	Cayman Islands	23.66	
6	7	Jayden Hadler	Australia	23.76	
7	2	Joseph Schooling	Singapore	23.96	
8	1	Chris Wright	Australia	23.97	
