= Saint Vincent and the Grenadines at the 2022 Commonwealth Games =

- Flag of Saint Vincent and the Grenadines
- CG code: SVG
- CGA: Saint Vincent and the Grenadines Olympic Committee
- Website: svgnoc.org

in Birmingham, England 28 July 2022 – 8 August 2022
- Competitors: 21 (12 men and 9 women) in 5 sports
- Flag bearers (opening): Shane Cadogan; Mikeisha Welcome
- Flag bearer (closing): TBD
- Medals: Gold 0 Silver 0 Bronze 0 Total 0

Commonwealth Games appearances (overview)
- 1958; 1962; 1966; 1970; 1974; 1978; 1982–1990; 1994; 1998; 2002; 2006; 2010; 2014; 2018; 2022; 2026; 2030

Saint Vincent and the Grenadines competed at the 2022 Commonwealth Games in Birmingham, England between 28 July and 8 August 2022. It was the team's thirteenth appearance at the Games.

On 8 July 2022, a team of 21 athletes (12 men and 9 women) competing in five sports was named. Shane Cadogan and Mikeisha Welcome were the country's flagbearers during the opening ceremony.

== Competitors ==
The following is the list of number of competitors participating at the Games per sport/discipline.

Sport	Men	Women	Total
Athletics	5	1	6
Cycling	1	0	1
Squash	3	1	4
Swimming	3	3	6
Table tennis	0	4	4
Total	12	9	21

== Athletics ==
A squad of six athletes was confirmed as of 8 July 2022.

Men
Track and road events

Athlete	Event	Heat		Semifinal		Final	
Athlete	Event	Result	Rank	Result	Rank	Result	Rank
McKish Compton	100 m	10.62	4	did not advance			
Javon Rawlins	100 m	10.79	7	did not advance			
Jabari Michael-Khensu	200 m	21.81	6	did not advance			
Desroy Jordan	400 m	47.29	5	did not advance			
Handal Roban	800 m	1:48.57	4	—N/a		did not advance	

Women
Field events

Athlete	Event	Final	
Athlete	Event	Distance	Rank
Mikeisha Welcome	Triple jump	13.22	7

== Cycling ==
One cyclist was selected as of 8 July 2022.

=== Road ===
Men

Athlete	Event	Time	Rank
Trevor Bailey	Road race	DNF	

== Squash ==
A squad of four players (three men, one woman) was selected on 24 April 2022.

Singles

Athlete	Event	Round of 64	Round of 32	Round of 16	Quarterfinals	Semifinals	Final	
Athlete	Event	Opposition Score	Opposition Score	Opposition Score	Opposition Score	Opposition Score	Opposition Score	Rank
Othneil Bailey	Men's singles	Creed (WAL); L 0 - 3	did not advance					
Jason Doyle	Men's singles	Dowling (AUS); L 0 - 3	did not advance					
Jules Snagg	Men's singles	Chileshe (NZL); L 0 - 3	did not advance					
Jada Ross	Women's singles	Singh (IND); L 0 - 3	did not advance					

Doubles

Athlete	Event	Round of 32	Round of 16	Quarterfinals	Semifinals	Final	
Athlete	Event	Opposition Score	Opposition Score	Opposition Score	Opposition Score	Opposition Score	Rank
Othneil Bailey; Jason Doyle	Men's doubles	Binnie / Morrison (JAM); L 1 - 2	did not advance				

== Swimming ==
A squad of six swimmers was confirmed as of 8 July 2022.

Men

Athlete	Event	Heat		Semifinal		Final	
Athlete	Event	Time	Rank	Time	Rank	Time	Rank
Kenale Alleyne	50 m freestyle	25.04	52	did not advance			
Shane Cadogan	50 m freestyle	24.38	38	did not advance			
Bryson George	50 m freestyle	26.08	58	did not advance			
Kenale Alleyne	100 m freestyle	54.80	54	did not advance			
Shane Cadogan	100 m freestyle	54.95	56	did not advance			
Kenale Alleyne	50 m backstroke	29.71	40	did not advance			
Bryson George	50 m backstroke	31.35	43	did not advance			
Shane Cadogan	50 m breaststroke	29.89	29	did not advance			
Bryson George	50 m breaststroke	32.08	36	did not advance			
Shane Cadogan	100 m breaststroke	1:08.53	31	did not advance			
Bryson George	100 m breaststroke	1:13.19	34	did not advance			
Shane Cadogan	50 m butterfly	26.39	42	did not advance			
Bryson George	50 m butterfly	27.44	49	did not advance			

Women

Athlete	Event	Heat		Semifinal		Final	
Athlete	Event	Time	Rank	Time	Rank	Time	Rank
Abigail Deshong	50 m freestyle	29.37	57	did not advance			
Tia Gun-Munro	50 m freestyle	28.84	52	did not advance			
Jamie Joachim	50 m freestyle	28.88	53	did not advance			
Jamie Joachim	100 m freestyle	1:03.66	50	did not advance			
Jamie Joachim	200 m freestyle	2:21.47	27	—N/a		did not advance	
Jamie Joachim	50 m backstroke	33.90	31	did not advance			
Jamie Joachim	100 m backstroke	1:12.40	26	did not advance			
Abigail Deshong	50 m breaststroke	37.42	27	did not advance			
Tia Gun-Munro	50 m breaststroke	37.24	26	did not advance			
Tia Gun-Munro	100 m breaststroke	1:22.01	25	did not advance			
Abigail Deshong	50 m butterfly	30.20	37	did not advance			
Jamie Joachim	50 m butterfly	30.90	41				
Jamie Joachim	100 m butterfly	1:12.81	36	did not advance			
Jamie Joachim	200 m individual medley	did not start		—N/a		did not advance	

== Table tennis ==
Saint Vincent and the Grenadines qualified for the women's team event via the ITTF World Team Rankings (as of 2 January 2020). Four players were selected as of 8 July 2022.

Doubles

Athletes	Event	Round of 64	Round of 32	Round of 16	Quarterfinal	Semifinal	Final / BM	
Athletes	Event	Opposition Score	Opposition Score	Opposition Score	Opposition Score	Opposition Score	Opposition Score	Rank
Shanecia Delpesche; Jessica McCarter	Women's doubles	Bye	Feng / Liu (AUS); L 0 - 3	did not advance				
Unica Velox; Leah Cumberbatch	Women's doubles	Bye	Ali / Nazim (MDV); W WO	Wong / Zhou (SGP); L 0 - 3	did not advance			

Team

Athletes	Event	Group Stage				Quarterfinal	Semifinal	Final	Rank
Athletes	Event	Opposition Score	Opposition Score	Opposition Score	Rank	Opposition Score	Opposition Score	Opposition Score	Rank
Leah Cumberbatch; Jessica McCarter; Shanecia Delpesche; Unica Velox	Women's team	Nigeria; L 0 - 3	England; L 0 - 3	Singapore; L 0 - 3	4	did not advance			
