= Swimming at the 2015 Pan American Games – Men's 200 metre breaststroke =

Men's 200 metre breaststroke at the 2015 Pan American Games
- Venue: CIBC Pan Am/Parapan Am Aquatics Centre and Field House
- Dates: July 15 (preliminaries and finals)
- Competitors: 22 from 15 nations
- Winning time: 2:09.82

Medalists
Gold medal	Thiago Simon	Brazil
Silver medal	Richard Funk	Canada
Bronze medal	Thiago Pereira	Brazil

The men's 200 metre breaststroke competition of the swimming events at the 2015 Pan American Games took place on July 15 at the CIBC Pan Am/Parapan Am Aquatics Centre and Field House in Toronto, Canada. The defending Pan American Games champion was Sean Mahoney of the United States.

This race consisted of four lengths of the pool, all lengths in breaststroke. The top eight swimmers from the heats would qualify for the A final (where the medals would be awarded), while the next best eight swimmers would qualify for the B final.

== Records ==
Prior to this competition, the existing world and Pan American Games records were as follows:

World record	Akihiro Yamaguchi (JPN)	2:07.01	Gifu, Japan	September 15, 2012
Pan American Games record	Sean Mahoney (USA)	2:11.62	Guadalajara, Mexico	October 18, 2011

The following new records were set during this competition.

Date	Event	Name	Nationality	Time	Record
15 July	Heats	Jorge Murillo	Colombia	2:11.62	=GR
15 July	A Final	Thiago Simon	Brazil	2:09.82	GR

== Qualification ==
Each National Olympic Committee (NOC) was able to enter up to two entrants providing they had met the A standard (2:19.49) in the qualifying period (January 1, 2014 to May 1, 2015). NOCs were also permitted to enter one athlete providing they had met the B standard (2:27.86) in the same qualifying period. All other competing athletes were entered as universality spots.

== Schedule ==
All times are Eastern Time Zone (UTC-4).

Date	Time	Round
July 15, 2015	10:44	Heats
July 15, 2015	19:57	Final B
July 15, 2015	20:04	Final A

== Results ==
KEY:	q	Fastest non-qualifiers	Q	Qualified	GR	Games record	NR	National record	PB	Personal best	SB	Seasonal best

=== Heats ===
The first round was held on July 15.

Rank	Heat	Lane	Name	Nationality	Time	Notes
1	1	3	Jorge Murillo	Colombia	2:11.62	QA, =GR, NR
2	3	4	Thiago Simon	Brazil	2:12.05	QA
3	2	5	Richard Funk	Canada	2:12.22	QA
4	2	4	B.J. Johnson	United States	2:12.81	QA
5	1	4	Thiago Pereira	Brazil	2:12.89	QA
6	3	5	Carlos Claverie	Venezuela	2:12.97	QA
7	2	3	Miguel De Lara	Mexico	2:13.79	QA
8	3	6	Carlos Mahecha	Colombia	2:14.20	QA
9	1	5	Brad Craig	United States	2:14.31	QB
10	2	6	Miguel Chavez	Mexico	2:16.07	QB
11	3	3	James Dergousoff	Canada	2:16.30	QB
12	1	6	Juan Sequera	Venezuela	2:17.52	QB
13	3	2	Facundo Miguelena	Argentina	2:17.67	QB
14	3	1	Dustin Tynes	Bahamas	2:18.13	QB
15	2	2	Rodrigo Frutos	Argentina	2:19.03	QB
16	3	7	Jordy Groters	Aruba	2:20.40	QB
17	1	2	Julian Fletcher	Bermuda	2:20.97	
18	1	7	Rafael Alfaro	El Salvador	2:21.05	
19	2	1	Esteban Araya	Costa Rica	2:24.88	
20	2	7	Gerardo Huidobro	Peru	2:26.30	
21	3	8	Renato Prono	Paraguay	2:27.13	
22	1	1	Corey Ollivierre	Grenada	2:41.52	

=== B Final ===
The B final was also held on July 15.

Rank	Lane	Name	Nationality	Time	Notes
9	4	Brad Craig	United States	2:14.04	
10	5	Miguel Chavez	Mexico	2:15.19	
11	3	James Dergousoff	Canada	2:15.31	
12	6	Juan Sequera	Venezuela	2:17.23	
13	2	Facundo Miguelena	Argentina	2:17.65	
14	7	Dustin Tynes	Bahamas	2:18.14	
15	1	Rodrigo Frutos	Argentina	2:18.48	
16	8	Jordy Groters	Aruba	2:18.55	

=== A Final ===
The A final was also held on July 15.

Rank	Lane	Name	Nationality	Time	Notes
1st place, gold medalist(s)	5	Thiago Simon	Brazil	2:09.82	GR
2nd place, silver medalist(s)	3	Richard Funk	Canada	2:11.51	
3rd place, bronze medalist(s)	2	Thiago Pereira	Brazil	2:11.93	
4	6	B.J. Johnson	United States	2:12.19	
5	4	Jorge Murillo	Colombia	2:12.71	
6	7	Carlos Claverie	Venezuela	2:13.22	
7	1	Miguel De Lara	Mexico	2:14.11	
8	8	Carlos Mahecha	Colombia	2:15.25	
