= Saint Vincent and the Grenadines at the 2018 Commonwealth Games =

- Flag of Saint Vincent and the Grenadines
- CGF code: SVG
- CGA: Saint Vincent and the Grenadines National Olympic Committee
- Website: svgnoc.org

in Gold Coast, Australia 4 April 2018 – 15 April 2018
- Competitors: 20 in 6 sports
- Medals Ranked 0th: Gold 0 Silver 0 Bronze 0 Total 0

Commonwealth Games appearances (overview)
- 1958; 1962; 1966; 1970; 1974; 1978; 1982–1990; 1994; 1998; 2002; 2006; 2010; 2014; 2018; 2022; 2026; 2030

Saint Vincent and the Grenadines competed at the 2018 Commonwealth Games in the Gold Coast, Australia from April 4 to April 15, 2018.

== Competitors ==
The following is the list of number of competitors participating at the Games per sport/discipline.

Sport	Men	Women	Total
Athletics	5	1	6
Cycling	2	0	2
Squash	4	0	4
Swimming	4	0	4
Table tennis	3	0	3
Weightlifting	0	1	1
Total	18	2	20

== Athletics ==
Saint Vincent and the Grenadines participated with 6 athletes (5 men and 1 woman).

Men
Track & road events

Athlete	Event	Heat		Semifinal		Final	
Athlete	Event	Result	Rank	Result	Rank	Result	Rank
Kemroy Cupid	200 m	DNF		Did not advance			
Kimorie Shearman	200 m	DNS		Did not advance			
Kimorie Shearman	400 m	46.66	2 Q	46.51	5	Did not advance	
Kasique Oliver	800 m	1:51.55	7	—N/a		Did not advance	
Akani Slater	800 m	1:48.83	5	—N/a		Did not advance	

Field events

Athlete	Event	Qualification		Final	
Athlete	Event	Distance	Rank	Distance	Rank
Jumonne Exeter	Triple jump	16.09	10 q	15.92	11

Women
Track & road events

Athlete	Event	Heat		Semifinal		Final	
Athlete	Event	Result	Rank	Result	Rank	Result	Rank
Kineke Alexander	400 m	53.63	6 q	54.35	7	Did not advance	

== Cycling ==
Saint Vincent and the Grenadines participated with 2 athletes (2 men).

=== Road ===
Men

Athlete	Event	Time	Rank
Trevor Bailey	Road race	DNF	
Enroy Lewis	Road race	DNF	

== Squash ==
Saint Vincent and the Grenadines participated with 4 athletes (4 men).

Individual

Athlete	Event	Round of 64	Round of 32	Round of 16	Quarterfinals	Semifinals	Final	
Athlete	Event	Opposition Score	Opposition Score	Opposition Score	Opposition Score	Opposition Score	Opposition Score	Rank
Othniel Bailey	Men's singles	Reel (KEN); W 3–2	Cuskelly (AUS); L 0–3	Did not advance				
Jason Doyle	Men's singles	Binnie (JAM); L 0–3	Did not advance					
Jules Snagg	Men's singles	Moran (SCO); L 0–3	Did not advance					

Doubles

Athlete	Event	Group stage			Round of 16	Quarterfinals	Semifinals	Final	
Athlete	Event	Opposition Score	Opposition Score	Rank	Opposition Score	Opposition Score	Opposition Score	Opposition Score	Rank
Jason Doyle; Jules Snagg	Men's doubles	Coll / Grayson (NZL); L 0–2	Hindle / Zammit-Lewis (MLT); L 0–2	3	Did not advance				
Othniel Bailey; Omari Wilson	Men's doubles	Adnan / Yuen (MAS); L 0–2	Beddoes / Williams (NZL); L 0–2	3	Did not advance				

== Swimming ==
Saint Vincent and the Grenadines participated with 4 athletes (4 men).

Men

Athlete	Event	Heat		Semifinal		Final	
Athlete	Event	Time	Rank	Time	Rank	Time	Rank
Alexander Cyrus	50 m freestyle	25.57	51	Did not advance			
Cruz Halbich	50 m freestyle	26.15	55	Did not advance			
Nikolas Sylvester	50 m freestyle	25.44	50	Did not advance			
Alexander Cyrus	100 m freestyle	57.56	52	Did not advance			
Nikolas Sylvester	100 m freestyle	58.67	53	Did not advance			
Cruz Halbich	200 m freestyle	2:09.61	30	—N/a		Did not advance	
Dillon Gooding	50 m backstroke	29.96	16 Q	29.74	16	Did not advance	
Cruz Halbich	50 m backstroke	31.24	18	Did not advance			
Cruz Halbich	100 m backstroke	1:08.08	23	Did not advance			
Nikolas Sylvester	50 m breaststroke	31.64	30	Did not advance			
Nikolas Sylvester	100 m breaststroke	1:11.60	27	Did not advance			
Alexander Cyrus	50 m butterfly	28.12	51	Did not advance			
Dillon Gooding	50 m butterfly	27.93	=47	Did not advance			
Nikolas Sylvester	50 m butterfly	27.93	=47	Did not advance			
Dillon Gooding	100 m butterfly	1:04.05	28	Did not advance			

== Table tennis ==
Saint Vincent and the Grenadines participated with 3 athletes (3 men).

Singles

Athletes	Event	Group stage			Round of 64	Round of 32	Round of 16	Quarterfinal	Semifinal	Final	Rank
Athletes	Event	Opposition Score	Opposition Score	Rank	Opposition Score	Opposition Score	Opposition Score	Opposition Score	Opposition Score	Opposition Score	Rank
Carlton Daniel	Men's singles	Rizal (MAS); L 0–4	Watson (JAM); L 0–4	3	Did not advance						
Andre Mitchell	Men's singles	Ranasingha (SRI); L 0–4	Cathcart (NIR); L 0–4	3	Did not advance						
Romano Spencer	Men's singles	Franklin (GUY); L 0–4	Chan Yook Fo (MRI); L 0–4	3	Did not advance						

Doubles

Athletes	Event	Round of 64	Round of 32	Round of 16	Quarterfinal	Semifinal	Final	Rank
Athletes	Event	Opposition Score	Opposition Score	Opposition Score	Opposition Score	Opposition Score	Opposition Score	Rank
Andre Mitchell; Romano Spencer	Men's doubles	Dookram / Wilson (TTO); L 1–3	Did not advance					

Team

Athletes	Event	Group stage			Round of 16	Quarterfinal	Semifinal	Final	Rank
Athletes	Event	Opposition Score	Opposition Score	Rank	Opposition Score	Opposition Score	Opposition Score	Opposition Score	Rank
Carlton Daniel; Andre Mitchell; Romano Spencer	Men's team	Canada; L 0–3	Sri Lanka; L 0–3	3	Did not advance				

== Weightlifting ==
Saint Vincent and the Grenadines participated with 1 athlete (1 woman).

Athlete	Event	Snatch		Clean & jerk		Total	Rank
Athlete	Event	Result	Rank	Result	Rank	Total	Rank
Rayen Cupid	Women's −75 kg	84	6	103	7	187	7

== See also ==
- Saint Vincent and the Grenadines at the 2018 Summer Youth Olympics
