= Saint Vincent and the Grenadines at the 2026 Commonwealth Games =

- Flag of Saint Vincent and the Grenadines
- CG code: SVG
- CGA: Saint Vincent and the Grenadines Olympic Committee
- Website: svgnoc.org

in Glasgow, Scotland 23 July 2026 – 2 August 2026
- Competitors: 8 in 2 sports
- Flag bearer: Kennice Greene
- Baton bearer: Matthew Ballah
- Medals: Gold 0 Silver 0 Bronze 0 Total 0

Commonwealth Games appearances (overview)
- 1958; 1962; 1966; 1970; 1974; 1978; 1982–1990; 1994; 1998; 2002; 2006; 2010; 2014; 2018; 2022; 2026; 2030

The Saint Vincent and the Grenadines competed at the 2026 Commonwealth Games in Glasgow, Scotland. This marked The Saint Vincent and the Grenadines' 14th participation at the games, after making its debut at the 1958 Commonwealth Games.

The King's Baton relay stopped in Saint Vincent and the Grenadines in June 2025. The Saint Vincent and the Grenadines team consisted of eight athletes (six men and two women) competing in two sports (athletics and swimming).

Swimmer Kennice Greene was the country's flagbearer during the opening ceremony. Meanwhile, fellow swimmer Matthew Ballah was the baton bearer during the opening ceremony.

The Saint Vincent and the Grenadines team finished the Games without a medal. Its best result came from Shafiqua Maloney, who placed sixth in the women's 800 metres.

== Competitors ==
The following is the list of number of competitors participating at the Games per sport/discipline.

Sport	Men	Women	Total
Athletics	4	1	5
Swimming	2	1	3
Total	6	2	8

== Athletics ==
The Saint Vincent and the Grenadines entered five athletes (four men and one woman).

Key

Ranks given for track events are within the athlete's heat only.

- Q = Qualified for the next round
- q = Qualified for the next round as a fastest loser or, in field events, by position without achieving the qualifying target

Track events

Athlete	Event	Round one		Semifinal		Final	
Athlete	Event	Result	Rank	Result	Rank	Result	Rank
McKish Compton	Men's 100 m	10.51	3	Did not advance			
Amal Glasgow	Men's 400 m	46.03	9 q	46.46	16	Did not advance	
Handal Roban	Men's 800 m	1:47.28	12 Q	1:45.96	13	Did not advance	
Shafiqua Maloney	Women's 800 m	2:02.83	9 Q	1:59.81	2 Q	2:02.17	6

Field events

Athlete	Event	Qualification		Final	
Athlete	Event	Distance	Rank	Distance	Rank
Uroy Ryan	Men's long jump	8.04	2 Q	7.93	6

== Swimming ==
The Saint Vincent and the Grenadines entered three swimmers (two men and one woman).

Athlete	Event	Heat		Semifinal		Final	
Athlete	Event	Time	Rank	Time	Rank	Time	Rank
Matthew Ballah	Men's 50 m backstroke	28.44	31	Did not advance			
Matthew Ballah	Men's 100 m backstroke	1:02.71	25	Did not advance			
Alexander Joachim	Men's 50 m freestyle	23.98	33	Did not advance			
Alexander Joachim	Men's 50 m breaststroke	30.12	38	Did not advance			
Kennice Greene	Women's 100 m freestyle	1:01.28	45	Did not advance			
Kennice Greene	Women's 50 m butterfly	29.11	35	Did not advance			
