= Saint Vincent and the Grenadines at the Commonwealth Games =

- CGF code: SVG
- CGA: Saint Vincent and the Grenadines Olympic Committee
- Website: svgnoc.org
- Medals Ranked 40th: Gold 2 Silver 0 Bronze 1 Total 3

Commonwealth Games appearances (overview)
- 1958; 1962; 1966; 1970; 1974; 1978; 1982–1990; 1994; 1998; 2002; 2006; 2010; 2014; 2018; 2022; 2026; 2030

Saint Vincent and the Grenadines have competed at twelve Commonwealth Games, beginning in 1958. They attended every Games between 1966 and 1978, then did not participate again until 1994. They have competed in every Games since. Saint Vincent and the Grenadines have won three Commonwealth medals, but only one since returning to the Games in 1994.

== Medals ==
Games	Gold	Silver	Bronze	Total
1958 Cardiff	0	0	0	0
1962 Perth	did not attend			
1966 Kingston	0	0	0	0
1970 Edinburgh	0	0	1	1
1974 Christchurch	1	0	0	1
1978 Edmonton	0	0	0	0
1982 Brisbane	did not attend			
1986 Edinburgh	did not attend			
1990 Auckland	did not attend			
1994 Victoria	0	0	0	0
1998 Kuala Lumpur	0	0	0	0
2002 Manchester	0	0	0	0
2006 Melbourne	0	0	0	0
2010 New Delhi	1	0	0	1
2014 Glasgow	0	0	0	0
2018 Gold Coast	0	0	0	0
2022 Birmingham	0	0	0	0
Total	2	0	1	3
