= Saint Vincent and the Grenadines at the 2010 Commonwealth Games =

- CGF code: SVG
- CGA: Saint Vincent and the Grenadines National Olympic Committee
- Website: svgnoc.org

in Delhi, India
- Competitors: 16 in 6 sports
- Medals Ranked 23rd: Gold 1 Silver 0 Bronze 0 Total 1

Commonwealth Games appearances (overview)
- 1958; 1962; 1966; 1970; 1974; 1978; 1982–1990; 1994; 1998; 2002; 2006; 2010; 2014; 2018; 2022; 2026; 2030

Saint Vincent and the Grenadines competed in the 2010 Commonwealth Games held in Delhi, India, from 3 to 14 October 2010.

== Medalists ==
Medal	Name	Sport	Event	Date
Gold	Natasha Mayers	Athletics	Women's 100 m	October 7

== See also ==
- 2010 Commonwealth Games
