= Swimming at the 2014 Commonwealth Games – Women's 50 metre butterfly =

Women's 50 metre butterfly at the 2014 Commonwealth Games
- Venue: Tollcross International Swimming Centre
- Dates: 26 July 2014 (heats & semis); 27 July 2014 (final)
- Competitors: 47 from 29 nations
- Winning time: 25.20 GR

Medalists
| gold medal | Francesca Halsall | England |
| silver medal | Arianna Vanderpool-Wallace | Bahamas |
| bronze medal | Brittany Elmslie | Australia |

The women's 50 metre butterfly event at the 2014 Commonwealth Games as part of the swimming programme took place on 26 and 27 July at the Tollcross International Swimming Centre in Glasgow, Scotland.

The medals were presented by Tony Ward, International Paralympics Committee Technical Delegate and the quaichs were presented by Mike Summers, Chairman of the Falkland Islands Overseas Games Association.

== Records ==
Prior to this competition, the existing world and Commonwealth Games records were as follows.

| World record | Sarah Sjöström (SWE) | 24.43 | Borås, Sweden | 5 July 2014 |
| Commonwealth record | Marieke Guehrer (AUS) | 25.48 | Rome, Italy | 1 August 2009 |
| Games record | Marieke Guehrer (AUS) | 26.07 | Delhi, India | 4 October 2010 |

The following records were established during the competition:

| Date | Event | Name | Nationality | Time | Record |
|---|---|---|---|---|---|
| 26 July | Heat | Francesca Halsall | England | 25.64 | GR |
| 26 July | Semifinal | Francesca Halsall | England | 25.36 | GR |
| 27 July | Final | Francesca Halsall | England | 25.20 | GR |

== Results ==
=== Heats ===
| Rank | Heat | Lane | Name | Nationality | Time | Notes |
|---|---|---|---|---|---|---|
| 1 | 6 | 4 | Francesca Halsall | England | 25.64 | Q, GR |
| 2 | 5 | 4 | Brittany Elmslie | Australia | 26.18 | Q |
| 3 | 4 | 4 | Katerine Savard | Canada | 26.33 | Q |
| 4 | 6 | 5 | Alicia Coutts | Australia | 26.43 | Q |
| =5 | 5 | 5 | Amy Smith | England | 26.44 | Q |
| =5 | 6 | 6 | Tao Li | Singapore | 26.44 | Q |
| =5 | 6 | 2 | Arianna Vanderpool-Wallace | Bahamas | 26.44 | Q |
| 8 | 4 | 5 | Sandrine Mainville | Canada | 26.46 | Q |
| 9 | 5 | 3 | Madeline Groves | Australia | 26.74 | Q |
| =10 | 4 | 3 | Laura Quilter | New Zealand | 26.92 | Q |
| =10 | 6 | 3 | Rachael Kelly | England | 26.92 | Q |
| 12 | 4 | 6 | Michelle Williams | Canada | 27.02 | Q |
| 13 | 5 | 6 | Sian Harkin | Scotland | 27.03 | Q |
| 14 | 5 | 2 | Alys Thomas | Wales | 27.14 | Q |
| 15 | 6 | 7 | Marne Erasmus | South Africa | 27.40 | Q |
| 16 | 5 | 7 | Trudi Maree | South Africa | 27.62 | Q |
| 17 | 4 | 2 | Charlotte Atkinson | Isle of Man | 27.63 | |
| 18 | 4 | 7 | Quah Ting Wen | Singapore | 27.87 | |
| 19 | 5 | 1 | Marina Chan | Singapore | 28.06 | |
| 20 | 6 | 8 | Gemma Kane | Northern Ireland | 28.22 | |
| 21 | 6 | 1 | Yap Siew Hui | Malaysia | 28.30 | |
| 22 | 4 | 1 | Bethany Firth | Northern Ireland | 28.51 | |
| 23 | 3 | 4 | Trudiann Patrick | Jamaica | 28.78 | |
| 24 | 3 | 3 | Sylvia Brunlehner | Kenya | 28.79 | |
| 25 | 3 | 5 | Felicity Passon | Seychelles | 28.95 | |
| 26 | 5 | 8 | Jannah Sonnenschein | Mozambique | 29.13 | |
| 27 | 3 | 2 | Niamh Robinson | Isle of Man | 29.30 | |
| 28 | 3 | 6 | Emily Chan Chee | Mauritius | 29.34 | |
| 29 | 4 | 8 | Caroline Puamau | Fiji | 29.46 | |
| 30 | 2 | 6 | Joyce Tafatatha | Malawi | 29.59 | |
| 31 | 3 | 7 | Ophelia Swayne | Ghana | 29.66 | |
| 32 | 2 | 1 | Izzy Joachim | Saint Vincent and the Grenadines | 30.10 | |
| 33 | 2 | 3 | Oreoluwa Cherebin | Grenada | 30.20 | |
| 34 | 2 | 2 | Kimiko Raheem | Sri Lanka | 30.44 | |
| 35 | 2 | 4 | Tegan McCarthy | Papua New Guinea | 30.55 | |
| 36 | 2 | 5 | Kiran Khan | Pakistan | 30.56 | |
| 37 | 3 | 8 | Cheyenne Rova | Fiji | 30.67 | |
| 38 | 1 | 2 | Amarah Phillip | British Virgin Islands | 30.94 | |
| 39 | 1 | 4 | Evelina Afoa | Samoa | 31.23 | |
| 40 | 1 | 1 | Ger Ogot | Kenya | 31.31 | |
| 41 | 1 | 3 | Tieri Erasito | Fiji | 31.40 | |
| 42 | 1 | 6 | Savannah Tkatchenko | Papua New Guinea | 31.79 | |
| 43 | 2 | 8 | Anita Field | Kenya | 31.84 | |
| 44 | 3 | 1 | Irene Prescott | Tonga | 31.98 | |
| 45 | 1 | 5 | Nadeera Jayasekera | Sri Lanka | 32.05 | |
| 46 | 2 | 7 | Areeba Shaikh | Pakistan | 32.12 | |
| 47 | 1 | 7 | Aminath Shajan | Maldives | 35.00 | |

=== Semifinals ===
| Rank | Heat | Lane | Name | Nationality | Time | Notes |
|---|---|---|---|---|---|---|
| 1 | 2 | 4 | Francesca Halsall | England | 25.36 | Q, GR |
| 2 | 2 | 6 | Arianna Vanderpool-Wallace | Bahamas | 25.90 | Q |
| 3 | 1 | 4 | Brittany Elmslie | Australia | 25.91 | Q |
| 4 | 2 | 5 | Katerine Savard | Canada | 26.31 | Q |
| 5 | 1 | 3 | Tao Li | Singapore | 26.33 | Q |
| 6 | 2 | 3 | Amy Smith | England | 26.43 | Q |
| 7 | 1 | 6 | Sandrine Mainville | Canada | 26.48 | Q |
| 8 | 1 | 5 | Alicia Coutts | Australia | 26.49 | Q |
| 9 | 2 | 2 | Madeline Groves | Australia | 26.62 | |
| 10 | 2 | 7 | Rachael Kelly | England | 26.68 | |
| 11 | 1 | 2 | Laura Quilter | New Zealand | 27.00 | |
| 12 | 1 | 1 | Alys Thomas | Wales | 27.03 | |
| 13 | 1 | 7 | Michelle Williams | Canada | 27.04 | |
| 14 | 2 | 8 | Marne Erasmus | South Africa | 27.45 | |
| 15 | 2 | 1 | Sian Harkin | Scotland | 27.52 | |
| 16 | 1 | 8 | Trudi Maree | South Africa | 27.64 | |

=== Finals ===
| Rank | Lane | Name | Nationality | Time | Notes |
|---|---|---|---|---|---|
| 1st place, gold medalist(s) | 4 | Francesca Halsall | England | 25.20 | GR |
| 2nd place, silver medalist(s) | 5 | Arianna Vanderpool-Wallace | Bahamas | 25.53 | |
| 3rd place, bronze medalist(s) | 3 | Brittany Elmslie | Australia | 25.91 | |
| 4 | 7 | Amy Smith | England | 26.24 | |
| 5 | 2 | Tao Li | Singapore | 26.26 | |
| 6 | 6 | Katerine Savard | Canada | 26.27 | |
| 7 | 8 | Alicia Coutts | Australia | 26.52 | |
| 8 | 1 | Sandrine Mainville | Canada | 26.64 | |
