= Bahamas at the 2014 Commonwealth Games =

- Flag of the Bahamas
- CGF code: BAH
- CGA: Bahamas Olympic Committee
- Website: bahamasolympiccommittee.org

in Glasgow, Scotland
- Flag bearer: Arianna Vanderpool-Wallace
- Medals Ranked =24th: Gold 0 Silver 2 Bronze 1 Total 3

Commonwealth Games appearances (overview)
- 1954; 1958; 1962; 1966; 1970; 1974; 1978; 1982; 1986; 1990; 1994; 1998; 2002; 2006; 2010; 2014; 2018; 2022; 2026; 2030

The Bahamas competed in the 2014 Commonwealth Games in Glasgow, Scotland from 23 July – 3 August 2014.

== Athletics ==
Men
Track and road events

| Athlete | Event | Round 1 | | Semifinal | | Final | |
| Athlete | Event | Result | Rank | Result | Rank | Result | Rank |
|---|---|---|---|---|---|---|---|
| Warren Fraser | 100 m | 10.31 | =9 Q | 10.21 | =9 Q | 10.20 | 7 |
| Adrian Griffith | 100 m | 10.46 | =25 | did not advance | | | |
| Shavez Hart | 100 m | 10.32 | =10 Q | 10.29 | 17 | did not advance | |
| Michael Mathieu | 200 m | 20.55 | 1 Q | 20.68 | 12 | did not advance | |
| Teray Smith | 200 m | 20.91 | 20 Q | 21.13 | 22 | did not advance | |
| LaToy Williams | 400 m | 46.07 | 9 Q | 45.44 | 5 Q | 45.63 | 5 |
| Chris Brown | 400 m | 46.30 | 14 Q | 45.55 | 8 q | did not start | |
| Dennis Bain | 110 metres hurdles | 14.21 | 18 | —N/a | | did not advance | |
| Jeffery Gibson | 400 m hurdles | 49.66 | 5 Q | —N/a | | 48.78 NR | 3rd place, bronze medalist(s) |
| Adrian Griffith; Warren Fraser; Shavez Hart; Teray Smith | 4 x 100 metres relay | 38.52 | 3 q | —N/a | | 39.16 | 5 |
| Alonzo Russell; Michael Mathieu; Andretti Bain (Heat Only); Chris Brown; LaToy Williams (Final Only) | 4 x 400 metres relay | 3:03.71 | 1 Q | —N/a | | 3:00.51 | 2nd place, silver medalist(s) |

Field events

| Athlete | Event | Qualifying | | Final | |
| Athlete | Event | Result | Rank | Result | Rank |
|---|---|---|---|---|---|
| Lathone Collie-Minns | Triple jump | 15.03 | 17 | did not advance | |
| Lamar Delaney | Triple jump | 15.43 | 15 | did not advance | |
| Raymond Higgs | Long jump | 7.61 | 13 | did not advance | |
| Leevan Sands | Long jump | 7.48 | 15 | did not advance | |
| Ryan Ingraham | High jump | 2.20 | =1 q | 2.21 | =9 |
| Donald Thomas | High jump | 2.20 | =9 q | 2.21 | =9 |
| Jamal Wilson | High jump | 2.11 | =14 | did not advance | |

Women
Track and road events

| Athlete | Event | Round 1 | | Semifinal | | Final | |
| Athlete | Event | Result | Rank | Result | Rank | Result | Rank |
|---|---|---|---|---|---|---|---|
| Cache Armbrister | 100 m | 11.83 | =25 | did not advance | | | |
| Sheniqua Ferguson | 100 m | 11.60 | 12 Q | 11.52 | =12 | did not advance | |
| Nivea Smith | 200 m | 23.48 | Q | 23.22 SB | | did not advance | |
| Shaunae Miller-Uibo | 400 m | 52.34 | 4 Q | 51.58 | 5 Q | 53.08 | 7 |
| Lanece Clarke | 400 m | 55.24 | 29 | did not advance | | | |
| Teshon Adderley | 800 m | 2.08.24 | | did not advance | | | |
| Krystal Bodie | 100 metres hurdles | 13.71 | | —N/a | | did not advance | |
| Demeteria Edgecomb | 100 metres hurdles | 14.04 | | —N/a | | did not advance | |
| Katrina Seymour | 400 metres hurdles | 1:01.34 | | —N/a | | did not advance | |
| Sheniqua Ferguson; Shaunae Miller-Uibo (Heat Only); Krystal Bodie (Heat Only); Nivea Smith; Katrina Seymour (Final Only); Cache Armbrister (Final Only) | 4 x 100 metres relay | 44.50 | 4 Q | —N/a | | 44.25 | 6 |
| Christine Amertil; Shakeitha Henfield (Heat Only); Miriam Byfield; Lanece Clarke; Shaunae Miller-Uibo (Final Only) | 4 x 400 metres relay | 3:31.91 | 4 q | —N/a | | 3:34.86 | 7 |

Field events

| Athlete | Event | Qualifying | | Final | |
| Athlete | Event | Result | Rank | Result | Rank |
|---|---|---|---|---|---|
| Kenya Culmer | High jump | 12.87 | 13 | did not advance | |
| Tamara Myers | Long jump | 6.14 | 16 | did not advance | |
| Tamara Myers | Triple jump | 12.87 | 13 | did not advance | |
| Bianca Stuart | Long jump | 6.67 | 1 Q | 6.31 | 8 |

== Boxing ==
Men

| Athlete | Event | Round of 32 | Round of 16 | Quarterfinals | Semifinals | Final | |
| Athlete | Event | Opposition Result | Opposition Result | Opposition Result | Opposition Result | Opposition Result | Rank |
|---|---|---|---|---|---|---|---|
| Carl Heild | Welterweight | M Kaonga (ZAM); W 1-0 TKO-I | C Clayton (CAN); L 3–0 | did not advance | | | |
| Kieshno Major | Heavyweight | | | | | | |
| Godfrey Strachan | Middleweight | Bye | A Prince (TRI); L 3–0 | did not advance | | | |
| Rashield Williams | Light Welterweight | Bye | L Hindley (NZL); L 2-0 TKO | did not advance | | | |

== Cycling ==
=== Road ===
Men

| Athlete | Event | Result | Rank |
|---|---|---|---|
| Chad Albury | Road race | | |
| Anthony Colebrook | Road race | | |
| Anthony Colebrook | Time trial | | |
| Roy Colebrook jr. | Road race | | |
| Jay Major | Road race | | |
| Jay Major | Time trial | | |
| D'Angelo Sturrup | Road race | | |

== Judo ==
Men

| Athlete | Event | Round of 32 | Round of 16 | Quarterfinals | Semifinals | Repechage | Bronze Medal | Final | |
| Athlete | Event | Opposition Result | Opposition Result | Opposition Result | Opposition Result | Opposition Result | Opposition Result | Opposition Result | Rank |
|---|---|---|---|---|---|---|---|---|---|
| D'Arcy Rahming Jr | -66 kg | J Mahit (VAN); 101 | did not advance | | | | | | |

Women

| Athlete | Event | Round of 16 | Quarterfinals | Semifinals | Repechage | Bronze Medal | Final | |
| Athlete | Event | Opposition Result | Opposition Result | Opposition Result | Opposition Result | Opposition Result | Opposition Result | Rank |
|---|---|---|---|---|---|---|---|---|
| Cynthia Rahming | -57 kg | K Powell (WAL) 100 | did not advance | | | | | |

== Swimming ==
Men

| Athlete | Event | Heat | | Semifinal | | Final | |
| Athlete | Event | Result | Rank | Result | Rank | Result | Rank |
|---|---|---|---|---|---|---|---|
| Elvis Burrows | 50 m freestyle | 23.24 | 17 | did not advance | | | |
| Dustin Tynes | 50 m breaststroke | 29.08 | 15 Q | 29.53 | 15 | did not advance | |
| Dustin Tynes | 100 m breaststroke | 1:04.42 | 14 Q | 1:03.39 | 13 | did not advance | |
| Dustin Tynes | 200 m breaststroke | 2:22.90 | 15 | —N/a | | did not advance | |
| Elvis Burrows | 50 m butterfly | 24.83 | 14 Q | 24.74 | 14 | did not advance | |

Women

| Athlete | Event | Heat | | Semifinal | | Final | |
| Athlete | Event | Result | Rank | Result | Rank | Result | Rank |
|---|---|---|---|---|---|---|---|
| Arianna Vanderpool-Wallace | 50 m freestyle | 24.61 | 4 Q | 24.42 | 3 Q | 24.34 | 4 |
| Ariel Weech | 50 m freestyle | 25.93 | 14 Q | 25.72 | 12 | did not advance | |
| Arianna Vanderpool-Wallace | 100 m freestyle | 54.90 | 5 Q | 54.41 | 4 Q | 54.37 | 5 |
| Ariel Weech | 100 m freestyle | 56.50 | 12 Q | 56.58 | 15 | did not advance | |
| Joanna Evans | 200 m freestyle | 2:04.19 | 19 | —N/a | | did not advance | |
| Joanna Evans | 400 m freestyle | 4:17.81 | 16 | —N/a | | did not advance | |
| Joanna Evans | 800 m freestyle | 8:41.39 | 12 | —N/a | | did not advance | |
| Arianna Vanderpool-Wallace | 50 m butterfly | 26.44 | =5 Q | 25.90 | 2 Q | 25.53 | 2nd place, silver medalist(s) |

== Wrestling ==
Men's freestyle

| Athlete | Event | Round of 32 | Round of 16 | Quarterfinals | Semifinals | Repechage | Bronze Medal | Final | |
| Athlete | Event | Opposition Result | Opposition Result | Opposition Result | Opposition Result | Opposition Result | Opposition Result | Opposition Result | Rank |
|---|---|---|---|---|---|---|---|---|---|
| Rashji Mackey | −74 kg | Bye | Meyer (RSA); L 0–10 | did not advance | | | | | |
