= Grenada at the 2014 Commonwealth Games =

- CGF code: GRN
- CGA: The Grenada Olympic Committee
- Website: grenadaolympic.com

in Glasgow, Scotland
- Competitors: 16 in 3 sports
- Flag bearers: Opening:Kirani James; Closing:
- Medals Ranked 19th: Gold 1 Silver 0 Bronze 1 Total 2

Commonwealth Games appearances (overview)
- 1970; 1974; 1978; 1982; 1986–1994; 1998; 2002; 2006; 2010; 2014; 2018; 2022; 2026; 2030

Grenada competed in the 2014 Commonwealth Games in Glasgow, Scotland from 23 July to 3 August 2014. Kirani James won Grenada's first ever gold medal.

== Medalists ==
Medal	Name	Sport	Event	Date
Gold	Kirani James	Athletics	Men's 400 Metres	July 30
Bronze	Kurt Felix	Athletics	Men's decathlon	July 29

== Athletics ==
Men
Track & road events

Athlete	Event	Heat		Semifinal		Final	
Athlete	Event	Result	Rank	Result	Rank	Result	Rank
Paul Williams	100 m	10.70	37	did not advance			
Michael Wilson	100 m	11.00	56	did not advance			
Michael Wilson	200 m	21.90	=47	did not advance			
Joel Redhead	200 m	20.97	=18 q	20.99	20	did not advance	
Payton Hazzard	400 m	47.33	29	did not advance			
Kirani James	400 m	45.52	2 Q	45.14	1 Q	44.24	1st place, gold medalist(s)
Bralon Taplin	400 m	45.90	8 Q	46.68	18	did not advance	

Combined events – Decathlon

Athlete	Event	100 m	LJ	SP	HJ	400 m	110H	DT	PV	JT	1500 m	Final	Rank
Kurt Felix	Result	11.02 PB	7.43 SB	13.26 SB	2.11 SB	48.93	15.06	45.30 PB	4.50	66.33	4.47.66	8070 NR	3rd place, bronze medalist(s)
Kurt Felix	Points	856	918	683	906	865	842	773	760	834	633	8070 NR	3rd place, bronze medalist(s)
Lindon Victor	Result	11.06 PB	6.93 PB	14.18 PB	1.93 PB	50.15 PB	16.60 PB	51.29	3.60 =PB	68.55	5:03.68 SB	7429	9
Lindon Victor	Points	847	797	758	740	808	667	897	509	867	539	7429	9

Women
Track & road events

Athlete	Event	Heat		Semifinal		Final	
Athlete	Event	Result	Rank	Result	Rank	Result	Rank
Kanika Beckles	400 m	54.67	23 q	55.18	24	did not advance	

Key

- Note–Ranks given for track events are within the athlete's heat only
- Q = Qualified for the next round
- q = Qualified for the next round as a fastest loser or, in field events, by position without achieving the qualifying target
- NR = National record
- N/A = Round not applicable for the event

== Boxing ==
Men

Athlete	Event	Round of 32	Round of 16	Quarterfinals	Semifinals	Final	
Athlete	Event	Opposition Result	Opposition Result	Opposition Result	Opposition Result	Opposition Result	Rank
Jonathon Francois	Welterweight	Clayton (CAN); L 0 - 3	did not advance				
Imrod Bartholomew	Middleweight	Lusizi (RSA); L KO2	did not advance				

== Swimming ==
Men

Athlete	Event	Heat		Semifinal		Final	
Athlete	Event	Time	Rank	Time	Rank	Time	Rank
Andrew Hopkin	50 m freestyle	25.98	49	did not advance			
Corey Ollivierre	50 m freestyle	26.49	58	did not advance			
Chris Regis	50 m freestyle	25.46	44	did not advance			
Andrew Hopkin	100 m freestyle	58.50	54	did not advance			
Chris Regis	100 m freestyle	57.74	49	did not advance			
Andrew Hopkin	50 m backstroke	30.97	32	did not advance			
Andrew Hopkin	50 m breaststroke	32.89	31	did not advance			
Corey Ollivierre	50 m breaststroke	31.12	27	did not advance			
Corey Ollivierre	100 m breaststroke	1:09.39	27	did not advance			
Corey Ollivierre	200 m breaststroke	2:43.17	20	—		did not advance	
Corey Ollivierre	50 m butterfly	28.72	44	did not advance			
Chris Regis	50 m butterfly	28.35	41	did not advance			

Women

Athlete	Event	Heat		Semifinal		Final	
Athlete	Event	Time	Rank	Time	Rank	Time	Rank
Oreoluwa Cherebin	50 m freestyle	28.50	39	did not advance			
Oreoluwa Cherebin	50 m breaststroke	35.78	25	did not advance			
Oreoluwa Cherebin	100 m breaststroke	1:21.29	34	did not advance			
Oreoluwa Cherebin	50 m butterfly	30.20	33	did not advance			

== See also ==
- Grenada at the Commonwealth Games
