= Waterloo Elm =

Coordinates: 50°40′48.58″N 4°24′42.08″E

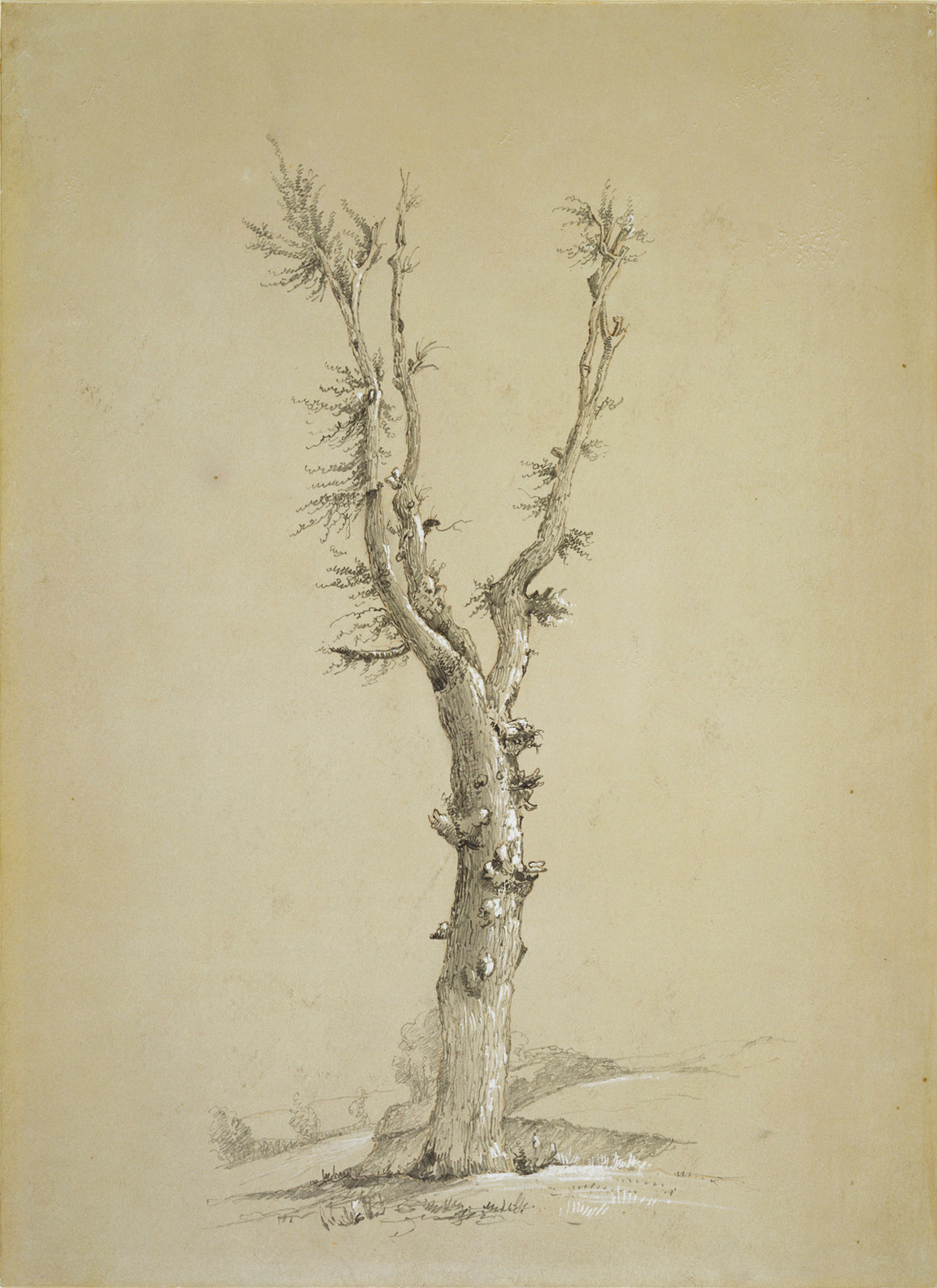
The Waterloo Elm by Anna Children (married name Atkins; died 1873).

The Waterloo Elm was located just south west of the intersection of the sunken lane and the Genappe–Brussels main road. It was the Duke of Wellington's command post for much of the Battle of Waterloo (18 June 1815). The tree was killed by souvenir hunters after the battle. It was felled in 1818 and made into furniture, including a chair, made by Thomas Chippendale, the younger, that was presented to George IV and remains in the British Royal Collection.

One of the souvenir hunters was Sir Walter Scott. In 1824 for a commission by Scott, Joseph Angell, a London silversmith, incorporated the wood into a silver quaich. It is engraved with Scott's motto, "Watch Well". Scott's "Waterloo Tree Quaich" was stolen along with other items from Abbotsford House in 1994. It was discovered in a French free-market and returned to its rightful owners in 2010.

The dead tree was purchased by John George Children, a Librarian in the British Museum and father of Anna Atkins, the artist of sketch to the right. He felled the tree and had it shipped to England. Apart from the Waterloo chair in the Royal collection, he had some other items made from the lumber: a minerals cabinet, a small table cabinet, (Note: A "small table cabinet (surmounted by a carved seated lion above the inscription 'WATERLOO') was sold at Christie's, London, 6 July 2000, lot 10 (RC staff 2000).) a writing table, (Note: A "writing-table was sold by Harris Lindsay Ltd, at Christie's, London, 10 May 2006, lot 140" (RC staff 2000).) a work-table (owned by Anne Atkins), a chair, and a stand with the bark still on it, for a bust of Wellington. Some timber was given to others and they too had pieces made; these included a chair made for the Duke of Rutland and a wine cooler in the possession of Wellington College.

== See also ==
- List of Waterloo Battlefield locations
