= Athletics at the 2014 Commonwealth Games – Women's 400 metres =

Women's 400 metres at the Commonwealth Games

The Women's 400 metres at the 2014 Commonwealth Games, as part of the athletics programme, took place at Hampden Park between 27 and 29 July 2014.

== Results ==
=== Heats ===
The first round consisted of six heats, with qualification for the first three in each heat, and the six fastest losers overall. Botswana's Amantle Montsho was the fastest qualifier from the first round, at 51.88 seconds.

==== Heat 1 ====
Rank	Lane	Name	Reaction Time	Result	Notes	Qual.
1	8	Chandrika Subashini (SRI)	0.173	53.75		Q
2	5	Regina George (NGR)	0.181	53.92		Q
3	7	Poovamma Machettira (IND)	0.178	54.01		Q
4	2	Wendy Fawn Dorr (CAN)	0.221	55.33		
5	6	Betty Burua (PNG)	0.199	55.48		
6	3	Samantha Edwards (ANT)	0.167	55.57		
7	4	Rhoda Njobvu (ZAM)	0.183	57.47		
8	1	Emily Nanziri (UGA)	0.203	59.02		

==== Heat 2 ====
Rank	Lane	Name	Reaction Time	Result	Notes	Qual.
1	4	Christine Day (JAM)	0.193	52.25		Q
2	3	Shaunae Miller (BAH)	0.171	52.34		Q
3	5	Kelly Massey (ENG)	0.153	52.34		Q
4	2	Anneliese Rubie (AUS)	0.155	52.86		q
5	7	Shawna Fermin (TRI)	0.215	54.10		q
6	6	Jacinter Shikanda (KEN)	0.194	54.81		
7	8	Shirley Vunatup (PNG)	0.213	1:00.10		

==== Heat 3 ====
Rank	Lane	Name	Reaction Time	Result	Notes	Qual.
1	4	Kineke Alexander (SVG)	0.182	52.98		Q
2	2	Kabange Mupopo (ZAM)	0.195	53.18		Q
3	8	Maureen Jelagat Maiyo (KEN)	0.177	53.21		Q
4	7	Ashley Kelly (IVB)	0.174	54.26		q
5	5	Vivian Mills (GHA)	0.164	55.19		
6	6	Phumille Ndzinisa (SWZ)	0.177	56.38		
7	3	Mariatu Suma (SLE)	0.226	57.15		
8	1	Halimah Nakaayi (UGA)	0.184	57.51		

==== Heat 4 ====
Rank	Lane	Name	Reaction Time	Result	Notes	Qual.
1	8	Stephenie Ann McPherson (JAM)	0.156	52.25		Q
2	5	Omolara Omotosho (NGR)	0.173	53.02		Q
3	3	Domonique Williams (TRI)	0.211	54.43		Q
4	2	Kanika Beckles (GRN)	0.180	54.67		q
5	6	Shawkia Iddrisu (GHA)	0.161	55.74		
6	7	Harriet Pryke (IOM)	0.176	56.15		
7	4	Donna Koniel (PNG)	0.244	58.40		

==== Heat 5 ====
Rank	Lane	Name	Reaction Time	Result	Notes	Qual.
1	5	Folashade Abugan (NGR)	0.368	52.84		Q
2	3	Shana Cox (ENG)	0.188	53.00		Q
3	7	Audrey Jean-Baptiste (CAN)	0.157	54.15		q
4	6	Lanece Clarke (BAH)	0.212	55.24		
5	4	Rebecca Ansumana (SLE)	0.155	DQ		
6	8	Afia Charles (ANT)	0.155	DQ		
DSQ	2	Amantle Montsho (BOT)	0.199	~~51.88~~		Q

==== Heat 6 ====
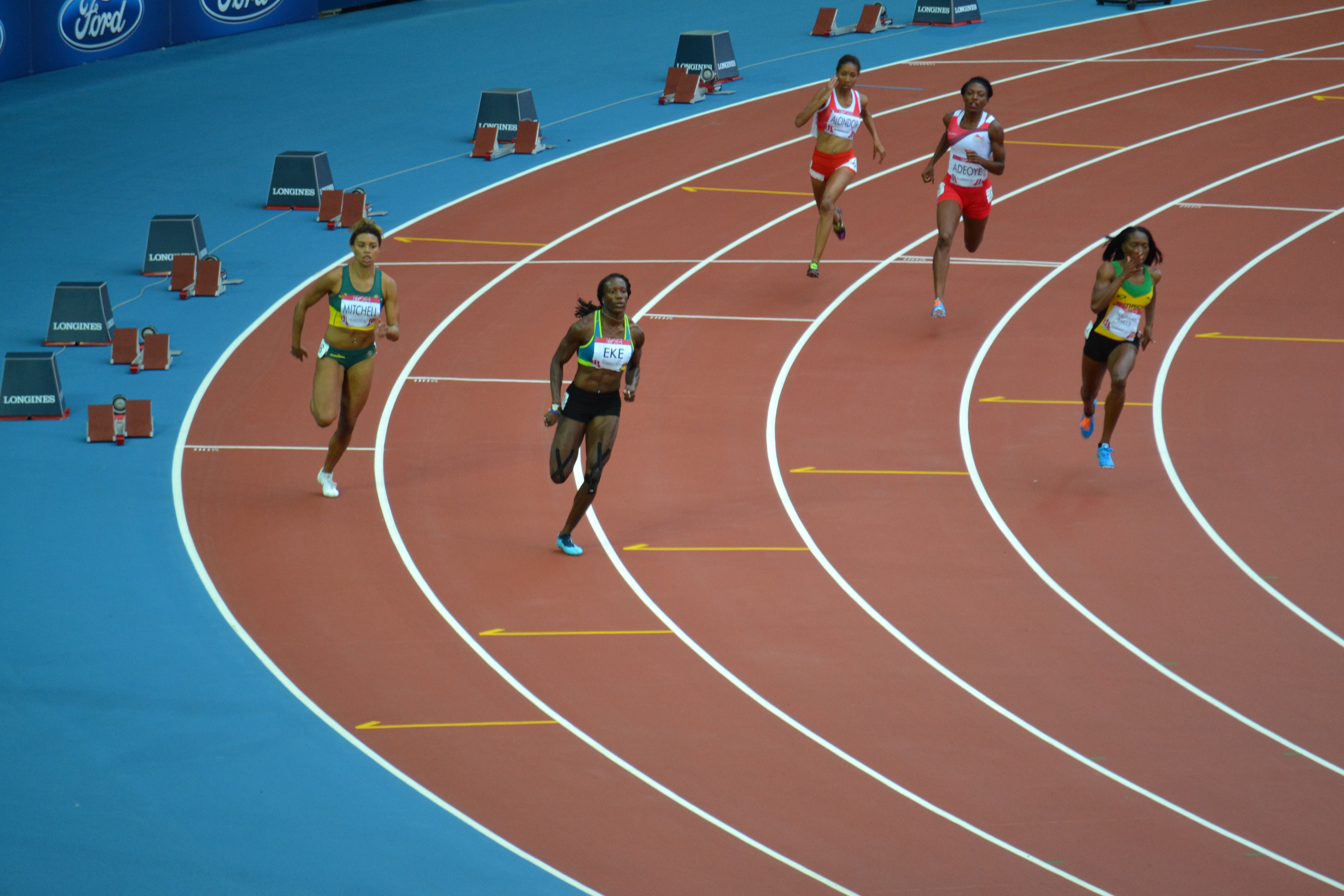
Heat 6

Rank	Lane	Name	Reaction Time	Result	Notes	Qual.
1	4	Novlene Williams-Mills (JAM)	0.240	52.39		Q
2	5	Margaret Adeoye (ENG)	0.176	53.98		Q
3	8	Morgan Mitchell (AUS)	0.168	54.28		Q
4	2	Leni Shida (UGA)	0.338	54.77		q
5	7	Catherine Eke (SLE)	0.214	54.80		
6	3	Romona Modeste (TRI)	0.172	55.16		
7	6	Aurelie Alcindor (MRI)	0.190	57.39		

=== Semifinals ===
==== Semifinal 1 ====
Rank	Lane	Name	Reaction Time	Result	Notes	Qual.
1	5	Stephenie Ann McPherson (JAM)	0.158	50.69		Q
2	7	Kelly Massey (ENG)	0.169	52.19	PB	Q
3	6	Omolara Omotosho (NGR)	0.200	52.34		
4	3	Chandrika Subashini (SRI)	0.172	52.67	SB	
5	8	Poovamma Machettira (IND)	0.153	52.88		
6	4	Kabange Mupopo (ZAM)	0.219	53.09		
7	1	Audrey Jean-Baptiste (CAN)	0.144	53.61		
8	2	Ashley Kelly (IVB)	0.185	54.35		

==== Semifinal 2 ====
Rank	Lane	Name	Reaction Time	Result	Notes	Qual.
1	6	Christine Day (JAM)	0.217	51.02		Q
2	3	Shaunae Miller (BAH)	0.156	51.58		Q
3	4	Folashade Abugan (NGR)	0.200	51.78	SB	q
4	5	Kineke Alexander (SVG)	0.188	52.12		q
5	8	Shana Cox (ENG)	0.176	52.57		
6	7	Morgan Mitchell (AUS)	0.176	53.37		
7	1	Shawna Fermin (TRI)	0.202	53.83	SB	
8	2	Kanika Beckles (GRN)	0.280	55.18		

==== Semifinal 3 ====
Rank	Lane	Name	Reaction Time	Result	Notes	Qual.
1	6	Novlene Williams-Mills (JAM)	0.372	50.73		Q
3	3	Margaret Adeoye (ENG)	0.180	52.48	SB	
4	1	Anneliese Rubie (AUS)	0.162	52.55		
5	7	Maureen Jelagat Maiyo (KEN)	0.165	52.97		
6	4	Regina George (NGR)	0.170	53.48		
7	2	Leni Shida (UGA)	0.268	54.30		
8	8	Domonique Williams (TRI)	0.177	54.63		
DSQ	5	Amantle Montsho (BOT)	0.261	~~50.79~~		Q

=== Final ===
Rank	Lane	Name	Reaction Time	Result	Notes
1st place, gold medalist(s)	3	Stephenie Ann McPherson (JAM)	0.156	50.67	
2nd place, silver medalist(s)	5	Novlene Williams-Mills (JAM)	0.260	50.86	
3rd place, bronze medalist(s)	4	Christine Day (JAM)	0.172	51.09	
4	2	Folashade Abugan (NGR)	0.209	52.33	
5	1	Kineke Alexander (SVG)	0.183	52.78	
6	7	Shaunae Miller (BAH)	0.159	53.08	
7	8	Kelly Massey (ENG)	0.166	53.08	
DSQ	6	Amantle Montsho (BOT)	0.212	~~51.10~~	
