= B. J. Johnson (swimmer) =

American swimmer (born 1987)

Personal information
- Full name: Bernard Henry Johnson
- Nickname: Baba Juice
- Nationality: United States
- Born: April 20, 1987 (age 39) Seattle, Washington, U.S.
- Height: 6 ft 2 in (1.88 m)
- Weight: 180 lb (81.5 kg)

Sport
- Sport: Swimming
- Strokes: Breaststroke
- Club: Stanford Aquatics
- College team: Stanford
- Coach: Skip Kenney (Stanford); Tony Batis (Stanford Aquatics)
Medal record
Men's swimming
Representing United States
Maccabiah Games
Gold medal – first place	2017 Israel	100 m breaststroke
Gold medal – first place	2017 Israel	200 m breaststroke

Bernard Henry (B.J.) Johnson (born April 20, 1987) is an American swimmer who competed for Stanford University and specializes in breaststroke events.

== Early life ==
Johnson was born in Seattle, Washington, and is Jewish. His parents are Sandra and Bernard Johnson, and he has a sister, Roxanne. His nickname is Baba Juice.

He attended Garfield High School in Seattle, Washington, where he graduated in 2005.

=== High School ===
At Garfield High School, Johnson was an All-American swimmer during both his junior and senior years. At the 2005 Washington state championship, he finished second in the 100 butterfly and the 200 IM. He was Most Valuable Player for his High School swim team, served as team captain, and was a scholar athlete. Skilled in both freestyle and stroke events, he held the Garland High School record in the 100 butterfly, the 50 freestyle and the 200 Individual Medley.

=== Stanford ===
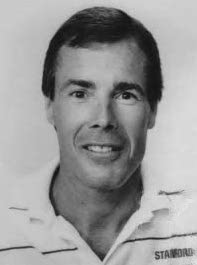
Coach Skip Kenney in 1988

He swam for Stanford University under Head Coach Skip Kenney, graduating in 2009 with a major in Mechanical Engineering. At Stanford, in both 2007 and 2008 Johnson was Pac-10 All-Academic first-team. In his junior season in 2007-08, his 2:04.07 time in the 200y breaststroke was the seventh-fastest time for Stanford on record, and his 57.25 time in the 100y breaststroke was the eighth-fastest. During his Stanford career, and subsequently, he swam for Tony Batis with Stanford Aquatics in Palo Alto. Batis began coaching Stanford Aquatics in 1992 as Head Coach, and with a strong program, had nationally rated swimmers, Junior National Champions, record-holders in the Pacific region, Olympic Trial Finalists and National finalists. Batis swam for the University of Southern California, and was a 1988 Olympic Trial participant.

Johnson qualified for the FINA 2013 World Aquatics Championships after he placed 2nd in the 2013 US National Championships in the 200m breaststroke with a time of 2:10.09. He also placed 4th in the 100m breaststroke with 1:00.68. In 2013 his personal best of 2:10.09 at the U.S. nationals led to him being ranked # 2 in the US, and # 9 in the world.

=== Competition highlights ===
In December 2014 Johnson won the 200y breaststroke at the King Marlin Elite Pro-Am in Oklahoma City with a time of 1:54.10.

As of February 2015, Johnson had recorded the all-time 9th-fastest U.S. time in the 200m breaststroke, and was on the U.S. National Swim Team. In July 2015 he represented Team USA at the 2015 Pan American Games, coming in 4th in the 200m breaststroke and 7th in the 100m breaststroke.

In April 2016, he won the 200m breaststroke in 2:14.16 at the Arena Pro Swim meet.

=== Maccabiah Games ===
Johnson was on Team USA at the 2017 Maccabiah Games, having chosen not to compete in the World Trials so he could place his attention on the Maccabiah Games. He won gold medals in the men's 100m breaststroke, with a time of 1:01.27 (a new Maccabiah record), as well as in the 200m breaststroke, with a time of 2:11.60.

From 2013-2015, he swam for Stanford Masters, part of United States Masters Swimming, focusing on the 50, 100, and 200 Breaststroke, and achieved a few top ten age group times.
