= Lorne Crerar =

Scottish lawyer

Lorne Crerar CBE FRSE
- Born: 1954 (age 71–72); Renfrew, Scotland
- Occupation: Lawyer
- Known for: Chairman & Co-Founder of Harper Macleod LLP; Chairman of Highlands and Islands Enterprise

Academic background
- Education: University of Glasgow

Academic work
- Discipline: Banking Law
- Institutions: University of Glasgow

Lorne Donald Crerar CBE FRSE (born 1954) is a Scottish lawyer who is co-founder & chairman of Harper Macleod and chairman of Highlands and Islands Enterprise. He was Professor of Banking Law at the University of Glasgow's School of Law 1997–2015. He was convener of the Standards Commission for Scotland 2003–2005 and chaired an independent review into the handling of complaints about public services.

== Early life ==
Crerar was born in 1954 in Renfrew, Scotland. He was educated at Kelvinside Academy in Glasgow.

He played rugby, representing Scotland at under-21 level but injury caused him to retired from playing the game at the age of 20. He continued to be involved with rugby as a club-level match referee.

Crerar studied law at the University of Glasgow.

== Law career ==
Crerar joined the Ross Harper & Murphy law firm in 1986. In 1988, at the age of 35, he co-founded a new law firm called Harpers along with Rod McKenzie, which later became Harper Macleod LLP.

In 1997 he was appointed Professor of Banking Law at the University of Glasgow's School of Law. He wrote The Law of Banking in Scotland which was first published in 1997, with a second edition ten years later.

== Public appointments ==
Crerar was the chairman of the Scottish Executive's Housing Improvement Task Force 2001–2003. He became a member of the Standards Commission for Scotland when it was formed in January 2002 and then took up the post of convener in June 2003, an appointment that ran until January 2005. In June 2006, the Scottish Executive announced an independent review, chaired by Crerar, that was to look at the systems of external scrutiny for Scotland's public services. A report was produced in 2007 that contained 42 recommendations that related to how improvements could be made to the regulation and inspection of the public sector and the complaints handling process.

He is generally credited as the architect of the Home Report System in Scotland as one of three Chairmen of the Housing Improvement Task Force

He was a board member of Highlands and Islands Enterprise since 2008. In February 2012, he was appointed by Ministers as Chairman of Highlands and Islands Enterprise (HIE).

Crerar was appointed Commander of the Order of the British Empire (CBE) in the 2019 Birthday Honours for services to economic and community development in Scotland. He was elected a Fellow of the Royal Society of Edinburgh in 2021.

== Rugby judicial officer ==
Crerar has chaired independent disciplinary panels for the Six Nations Championship, European Rugby Cup competitions and for the Scottish Rugby Union. He officiated at four Rugby World Cups, and was selected as a judicial officer for matches at the finals of both the 2007 and 2011 Rugby World Cups.
