= Andrew Willis (swimmer) =

British swimmer

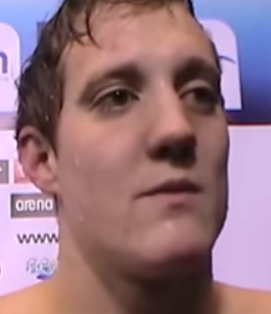
- Willis in 2012

Personal information
- National team: Great Britain
- Born: 3 December 1990 (age 35) Yateley, England
- Height: 1.88 m (6 ft 2 in)
- Weight: 87 kg (192 lb; 13.7 st)

Sport
- Sport: Swimming
- Strokes: Breaststroke
- Club: Bracknell & Wokingham
- College team: University of Bath
- Coach: David McNulty, Graeme Antwhistle
Medal record
Men's swimming
Representing England
World Championships (SC)
Silver medal – second place	2016 Windsor	200 m breaststroke
Commonwealth Games
Bronze medal – third place	2014 Glasgow	200 m breaststroke
European Championships (SC)
Bronze medal – third place	2015 Netanya	200 m breaststroke

Andrew Willis (born 3 December 1990) is an English former competitive swimmer who has represented Great Britain at the Olympics, the FINA World Championships and the European Championships, and England at the Commonwealth Games.

== Career ==
=== Early career (2010-2012) ===
Willis competed at the 2010 Commonwealth Games, where he finished 4th in the 200-metre breaststroke, and in the 2011 World Championships, where he made the final for the same event and finished 8th. At the 2012 Summer Olympics in London, he competed in the men's 200-metre breaststroke, finishing in 3rd place overall in the heats and qualifying for the final where he finished in 8th place. He was one of the very few British swimmers to achieve a personal best at the 2012 Olympics.

=== Later career (2012-present) ===
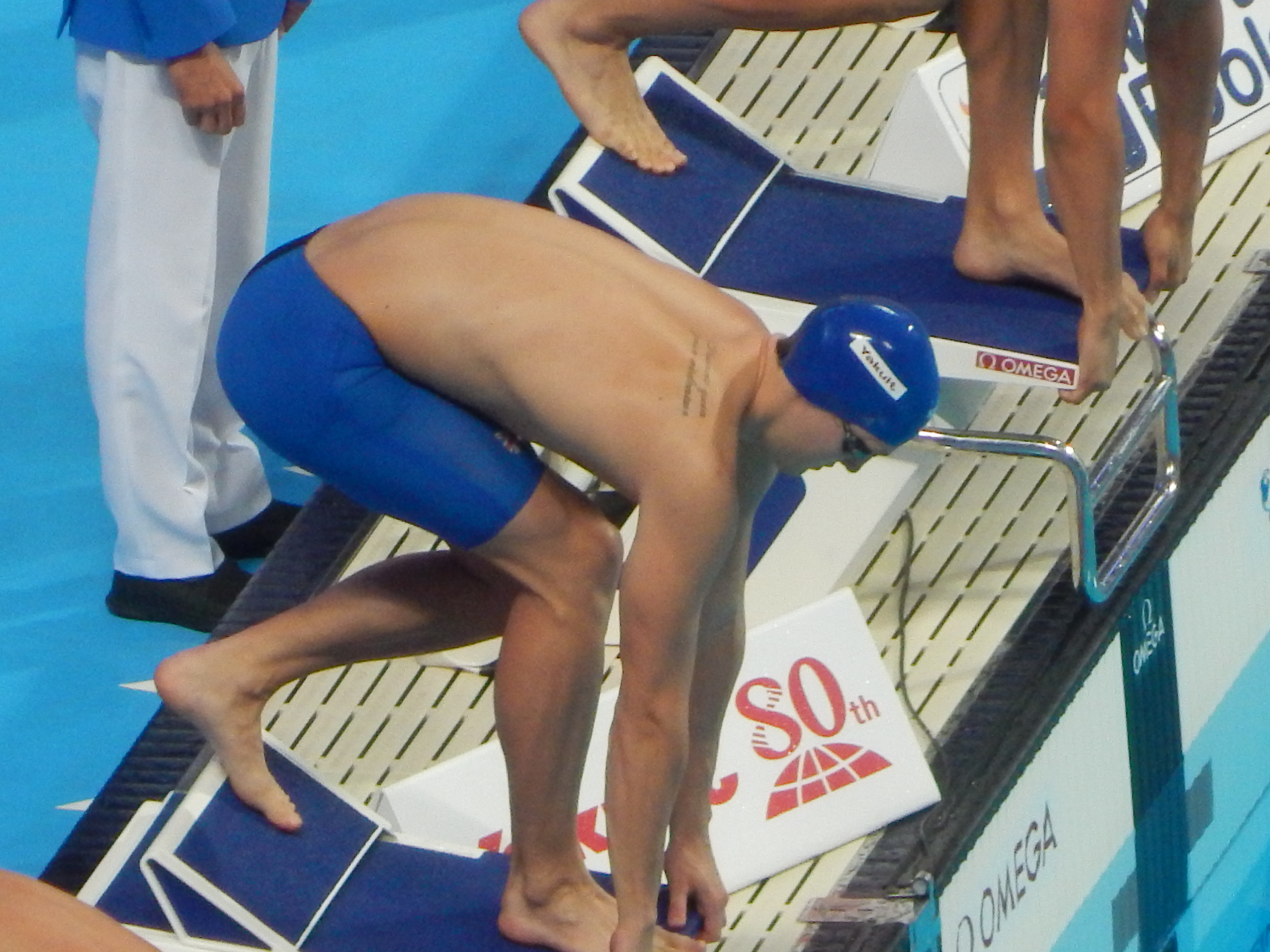
Willis competing at the 2015 World Aquatics Championships

Willis finished 4th in the 2013 World Championships and in the 2013 European Championships (SC) (both in the 200-metre breaststroke). He finished 4th in the 2014 European Championships and went on to win a bronze medal at the 2014 Commonwealth Games in the 200-metre breaststroke final in Glasgow. He finished 4th in the 2015 World Championships and won a bronze medal in the 2015 European Championships (SC) in the 200-metre breaststroke. He participated in the 2016 European Championships, and finished 4th in the final of the 200-metre breaststroke in the 2016 Summer Olympics in Rio. He went on to win a silver medal in the 2016 World Championships (SC). Willis made the final for both the 100-metre and 200-metre breaststroke in the 2018 Commonwealth Games, where he finished 8th and 4th respectively. In July 2018, Willis retired from competitive swimming.

== Personal bests ==
As of August 2018

Long Course
Event	Time	Meet	Date	Notes
100 m breaststroke	1:00.27	2016 British Championships	12 April 2016	
200 m breaststroke	2:07.73	2016 Olympic Games	9 August 2016	

Short Course
Event	Time	Meet	Date	Notes
100 m breaststroke	57.84	2016 World Championships (SC)	6 December 2016	
200 m breaststroke	2:02.71	2016 World Championships (SC)	8 December 2016	
