= Harper Macleod =

Scottish law firm

Harper Macleod LLP
- Headquarters: Glasgow
- No. of offices: 5
- Offices: Glasgow, Edinburgh, Inverness, Lerwick and Thurso
- Key people: Lorne Crerar, Chairman
- Date founded: 1988
- Founder: Lorne Crerar, Rod McKenzie
- Company type: Limited liability partnership
- Website: https://www.harpermacleod.co.uk/

Harper Macleod LLP is a Scottish law firm, headquartered in Glasgow.

== History ==
In 1988, Lorne Crerar and Rod McKenzie co-founded a new law firm called Harpers, which later took over another corporate law firm to become Harper Macleod. In 1990 the firm moved to a headquarters building in Gordon Street, Glasgow. In 2003 moved their Edinburgh office to Melville Street. By 2008 the firm had 45 partners and 115 staff.

In September 2011 the firm were announced as the first to sponsor of the 2014 Commonwealth Games, as a tier two partner deal, thought to be worth around £1million. The firm acted as legal adviser for the 2014 games.

The firm opened offices in Thurso in 2012. In August 2014, the firm announced that it was taking over private client firm Bird Semple. In September the firm announced that it had acquired a practice in Shetland, taking the number of people in the company to almost 400. In 2016 they took over the Inverness practice Allan & Shaw.
