= Shane Cadogan =

Vincentian swimmer (born 2001)

Personal information
- Nationality: Vincentian
- Born: 1 June 2001 (age 24)
- Height: 180 cm (5 ft 11 in)

Sport
- Sport: Swimming

Shane Christopher Cadogan (born June 1, 2001 in Kingstown) is a Vincentian swimmer. He specializes in the 50-metres freestyle and is competing at the 2020 Summer Olympics in Tokyo. He finished 49th in the 50 metre freestyle heats, and did not advance to the semifinals.

== Personal Bests ==
- 50-metre freestyle (25m pool) - 23.74s
- 50-metre freestyle (50m pool) - 24.71s
- 50-metre butterfly (50m pool) - 26.16 NR

NR = national record
