= Richard Funk =

Canadian swimmer (born 1992)

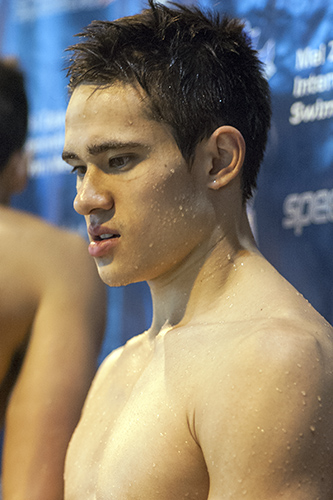
- Funk in 2012

Personal information
- National team: Canada
- Born: November 22, 1992 (age 33) Edmonton, Alberta, Canada

Sport
- Sport: Swimming
- Strokes: Breaststroke
Medal record
Men's swimming
Representing Canada
World Championships (LC)
| Bronze medal – third place | 2017 Budapest | 4x100 m mixed medley |
Pan American Games
| Silver medal – second place | 2015 Toronto | 200 m breaststroke |
| Bronze medal – third place | 2015 Toronto | 100 m breaststroke |
| Bronze medal – third place | 2015 Toronto | 4×100 m medley |

Richard Funk (born November 22, 1992, in Edmonton, Alberta) is a Canadian breaststroke swimmer.

Funk was a triple medallist at the 2015 Pan American Games in Toronto. In April 2017, Funk was named to Canada's 2017 World Aquatics Championships team in Budapest, Hungary.

== Internet meme ==
Funk has gained notoriety for a meme which involves his name and nationality displaying as "CAN Richard FUNK". As if for "can Richard funk?"
