= Quaich =

Two-handed drinking vessel from Scotland

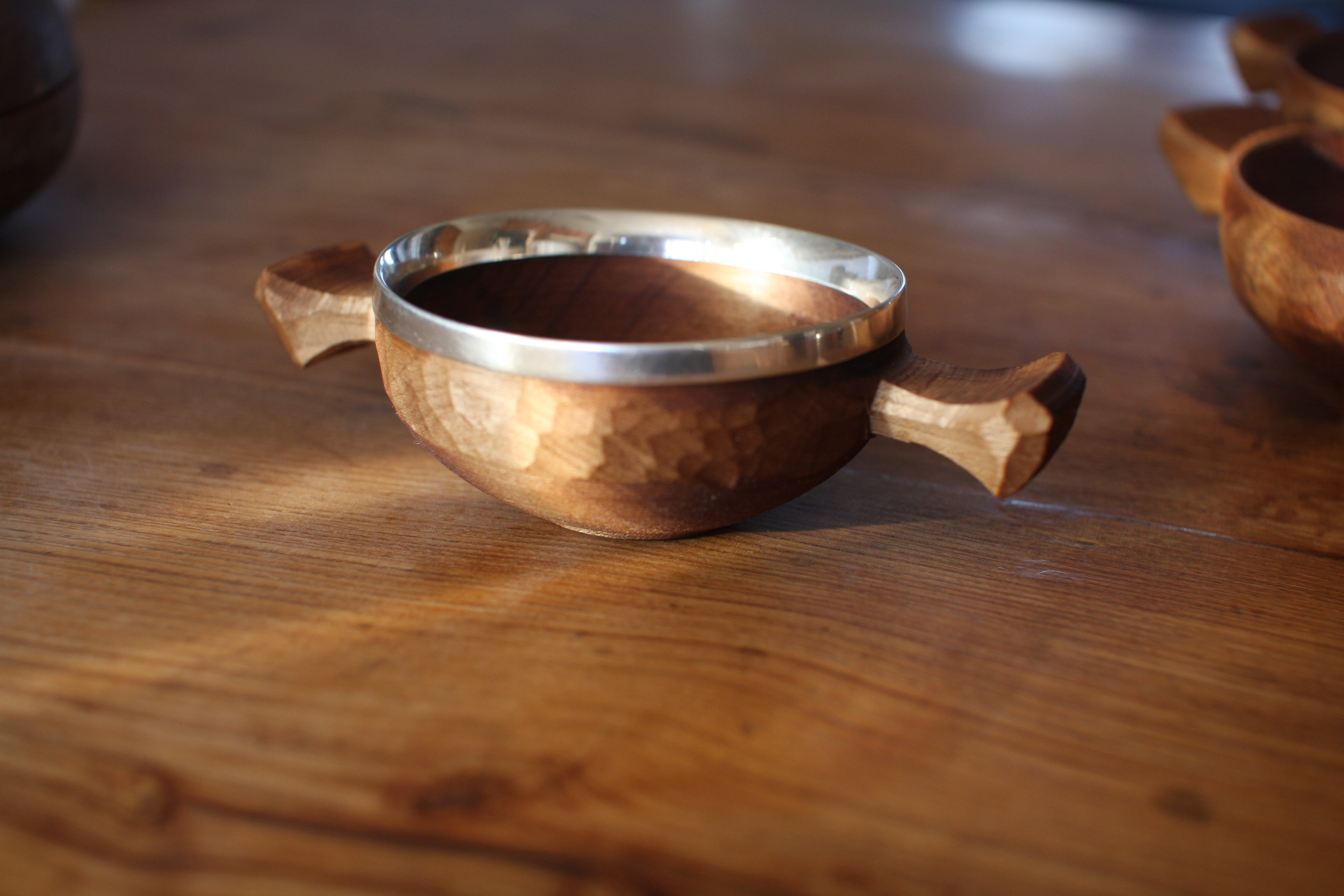
Sycamore and silver quaich

A quaich /ˈkweɪx/, archaically quaigh or quoich, is a special kind of shallow two-handled drinking cup or bowl traditional in Scotland. It derives from the Scottish Gaelic cuach (Scottish Gaelic pronunciation: [kʰuəx]), meaning a cup.

The quaich represents hospitality, peace, and friendship, sometimes being called a cup of friendship or a love cup.

Traditionally made of wood, quaichs are now also crafted from pewter or silver. They can be used to drink whisky or brandy and are also used as commemorative gifts or prizes.

In the modern day, they are often seen as part of a Scottish wedding, due to being a symbol of coming together.

== History ==
The origin of quaichs in Scotland is traced to the Highlands; it was not until the end of the 17th century that they became popular in such large centres as Edinburgh and Glasgow. The silversmiths of such local guilds as Inverness and Perth frequently mounted them in silver, as may be seen from the hallmarks on the existing examples.

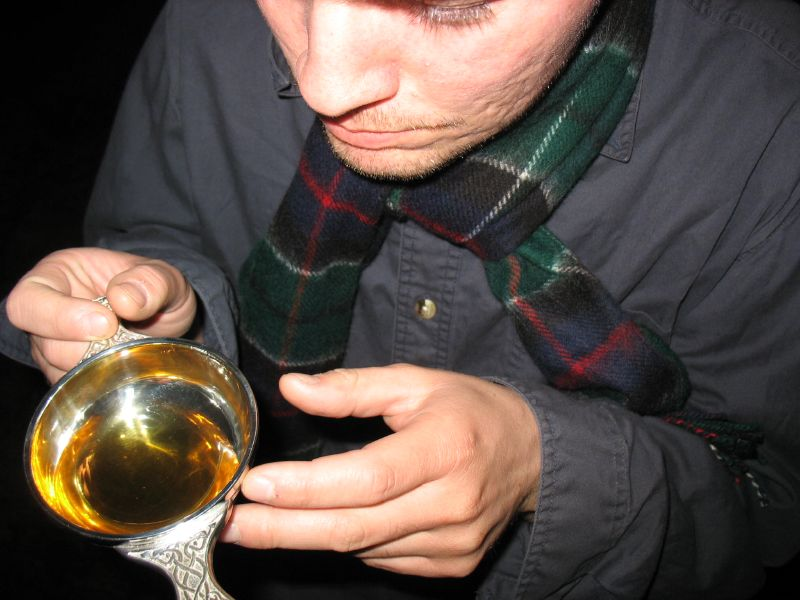
A quaich in use

According to the 1911 Encyclopædia Britannica, the quaich was inspired by the low silver bowls with two flat handles frequently used as bleeding vessels in England and the Netherlands in the 17th century.

Another popular theory suggests that the shape is derived from scallop shells. However, this seems to have had its origins in the poems of James Macpherson which were once thought to be translations of poems by Ossian, son of Fionn mac Cumhaill.

In his 1955 monograph Some Scottish Quaichs, Richard L. McClenahan, an American collector, suggests that the quaich evolved directly from the medieval mazer. This seems unlikely as the form and material (burr maple for mazers) are quite different. There were small stave-built drinking vessels common in the medieval period found around the Baltics and, since some of the earliest quaichs are stave-built, this could be the source.

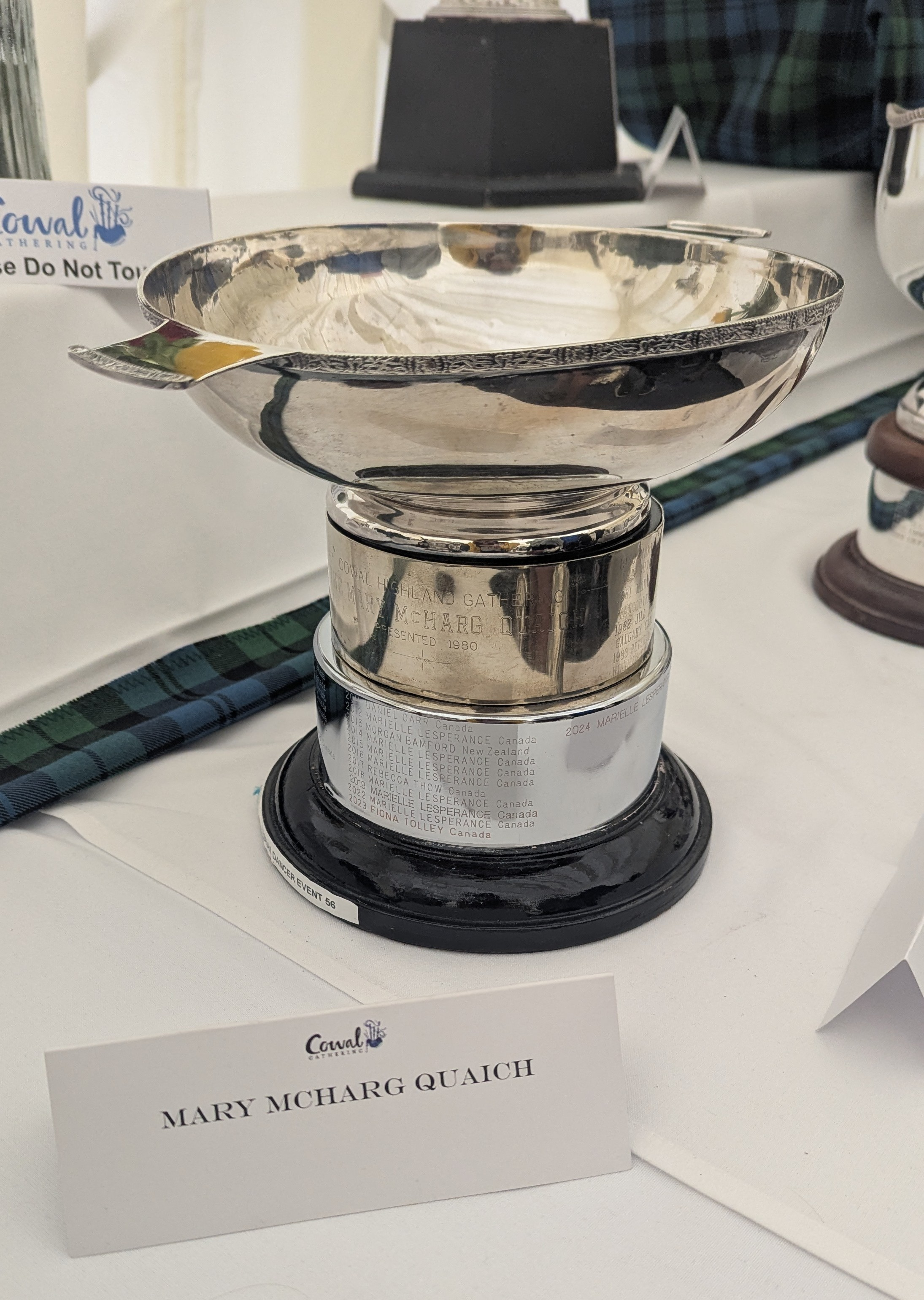
Mary McHarg Quaich - trophy awarded at Cowal Gathering

Traditionally quaichs are made of wood, an artform known as "treen". Some early quaichs are stave-built like barrels and some have alternating light and dark staves. The staves are held together by bands of willow or silver. They generally have two, and more rarely three or four, short, projecting handles. Other wooden quaichs were lathe-turned out of a single piece of wood and there was another group which were turned then carved outside in basket-weave pattern. In addition to wood, they are made of stone, brass, pewter, horn, and silver. The latter were often engraved with lines and bands in imitation of the staves and hoops of the wooden quaichs.

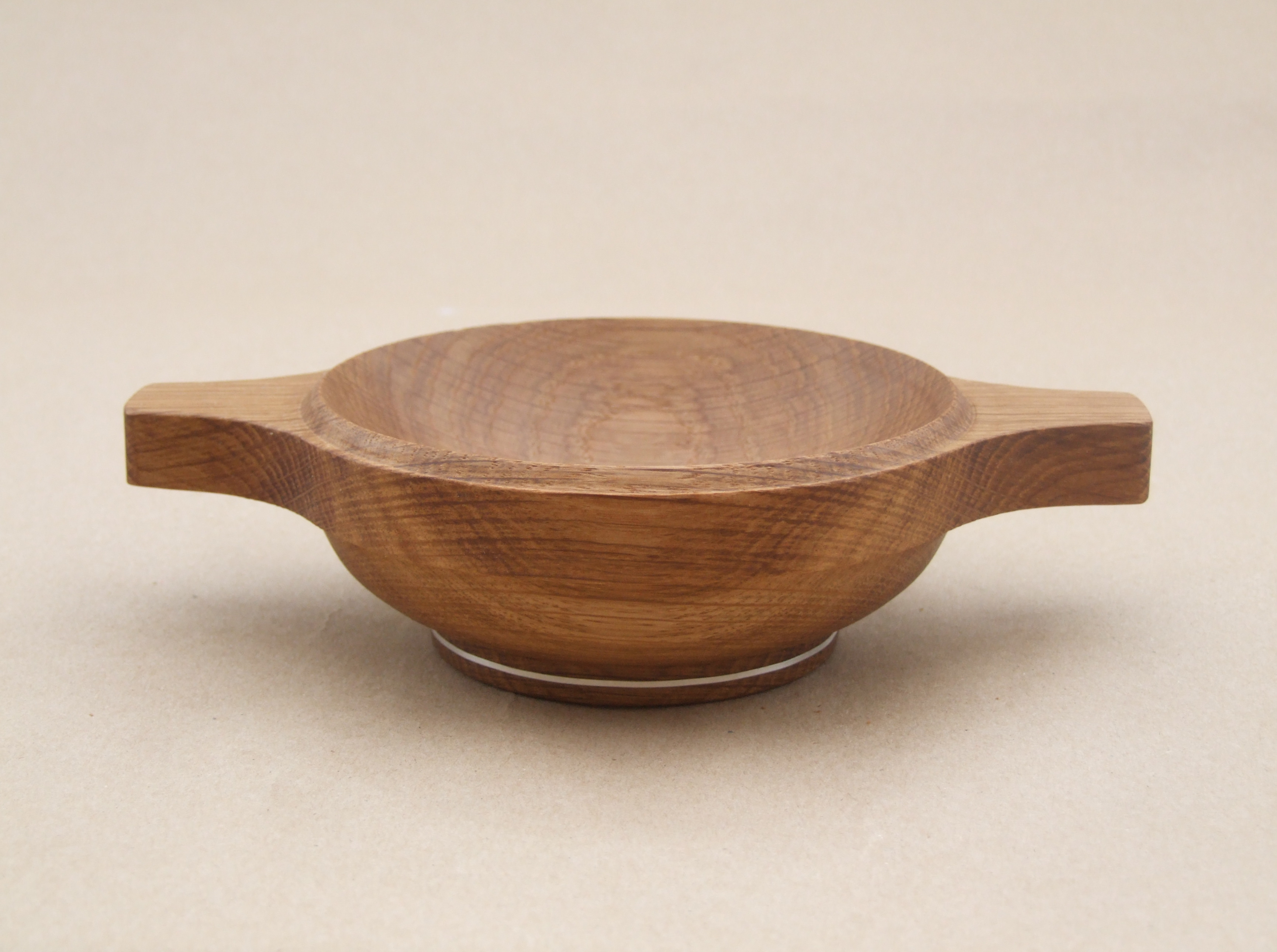
Oak quaich

The quaich was used for whisky or brandy, and in the 19th century Sir Walter Scott dispensed drams in silver quaichs. One of the quaichs he owned was the Waterloo Tree Quaich. It was made in part from wood Scott had taken from the Waterloo Elm, when he visited the battlefield shortly after the Battle of Waterloo (the elm tree had been the Duke of Wellington's command post for much of the battle). In his collection he also owned some other quaichs made from commemorative wood: one made from Falkland Oak; one made from Queen Mary's yew; and another made from the Wallace Oak. The one he kept for himself was made of wood with seven bands, and had travelled from Edinburgh to Derby with Bonnie Prince Charlie in 1745.

== Modern usage ==
Commemorative quaichs awarded as prizes, or given as gifts, are more commonly made of pewter or silver. These prize cups are rarely used for actual drinking.

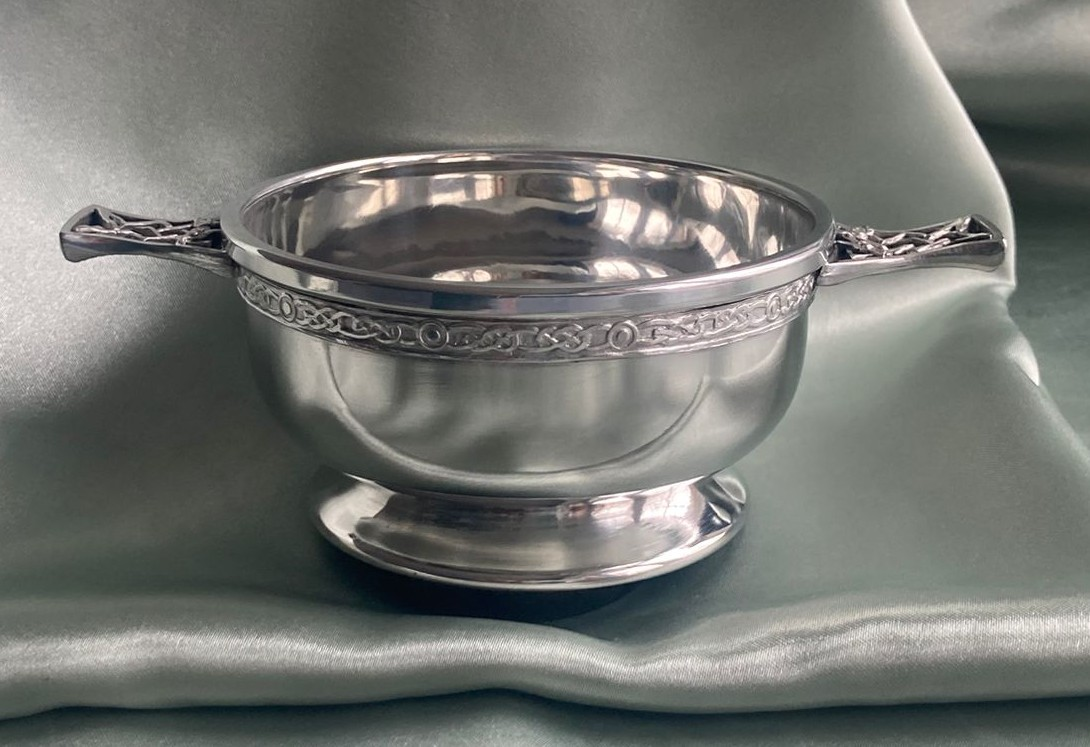
A pewter Quaich given as a wedding gift.

Wooden commemorative quaichs designed by Paul Hodgkiss were given as presents to winners at the 2014 Commonwealth Games in Glasgow.

The most common modern usage of quaichs is in Scottish wedding ceremonies. The couple share a drink from a quaich usually after signing the registry to represent the union between the two. It is also sometimes used at the reception for the first toast together.

They may also be seen at a Burns supper.

== Related vessels ==
Related vessels to the Scottish quaich include the porringer, a larger vessel typically 6 inches (15 cm) in diameter with one (US colonial) or two (European) horizontal handles. The Sami and Norrland, Sweden, equivalent is the kuksa, which also only has a single handle.

== See also ==
- Loch Quoich
- Glen Quaich
- Centenary Quaich – a rugby football competition
