= Saint Vincent and the Grenadines at the 2002 Commonwealth Games =

Sporting event delegation

Flag of St Vincent & the Grenadines

St Vincent & the Grenadines was represented at the 2002 Commonwealth Games in Manchester, England, by a fifteen-member contingent comprising nine sportspersons and six officials. The country's competitors were four competitors in athletics, one squash player, and four table tennis players, while the officials were one "Chef de Mission" (head of the entire contingent), one team attaché, one doctor, one team manager, and two head coaches.

Azik Graham competed in the men's 100 m dash, finishing with a time of 10.99 seconds. He placed 6th in his heat and did not advance to the next round. Nickie Peters participated in both the men's 800 m and 1500 m runs. In the 800 m, he finished in 1:52.73 and did not advance. He finished the 1500 m in a time of 3:53.09 and again did not advance. Pamenos Ballantyne competed in the men's marathon, finishing in 11th place with a time of 2:19:36.

Natasha Mayers, the contingent's only female member, participated in both the 100 m and 200 m races. In the 100 m, she advanced to the final and took 8th place overall with a time of 11.38 seconds. In the 200 m, she took 4th place overall with a time of 22.84 seconds, missing out on a bronze medal by 0.15 seconds.

James Bentick was the team's squash player, he competed in the men's singles event.

The four table tennis players were Kumani Finch, Deighton Calistus Doncarl King, Kerry Pierre, and Desmond Shallow. All four participated in the men's singles event, and King, Pierre, and Shallow competed together in the team event. For the men's doubles competition, the group broke into two teams, Finch and Shallow on one and King and Pierre on the other.

== Medals ==
	Gold	Silver	Bronze	Total
Saint Vincent and the Grenadines	0	0	0	0

== See also ==
- Saint Vincent and the Grenadines at the 2000 Summer Olympics
- Saint Vincent and the Grenadines at the 2003 Pan American Games
- Saint Vincent and the Grenadines at the 2004 Summer Olympics
