= Dustin Tynes =

Bahamian swimmer (born 1996)

Personal information
- Born: 7 March 1996 (age 30) Nassau, Bahamas

Sport
- Sport: Swimming

Dustin Tynes (born 7 March 1996) is a Bahamian swimmer. He competed in the men's 100 metre breaststroke event at the 2016 Summer Olympics, where he ranked 44th with a time of 1:03.71. He did not advance to the semifinals
