= Nikolas Sylvester =

Vincentian swimmer (born 2000)

Personal information
- Nickname: Nik
- Nationality: Vincentian
- Born: 20 January 2000 (age 26) Port of Spain, Trinidad and Tobago
- Height: 5’11”

Sport
- Sport: Swimming
- Club: Black Sands Swim Squad
- College team: Howard University Swimming and Diving

Nikolas Sylvester (born 20 January 2000) is a Vincentian swimmer. He competed in the men's 50 metre freestyle event at the 2016 Summer Olympics, where he ranked 61st with a time of 25.64 seconds, a national record. He did not advance to the semifinals. He also competed in five events at the 2018 Commonwealth Games.
