= Saint Vincent and the Grenadines at the 2006 Commonwealth Games =

Sporting event delegation

Flag of Saint Vincent and the Grenadines

Saint Vincent and the Grenadines was represented at the 2006 Commonwealth Games in Melbourne.

== Medals ==
	(gold)	(silver)	(bronze)	Total
Saint Vincent and the Grenadines	0	0	0	0

== Athletics ==
Men
Track and road events

Athlete	Events	Round 1		Round 2		Semifinal		Final	
Athlete	Events	Result	Rank	Result	Rank	Result	Rank	Result	Rank
Casnel Bushay	100 m	10.68	5	did not advance					
Casnel Bushay	200 m	did not start							

Field events

Athlete	Event	Qualification		Final	
Athlete	Event	Distance	Position	Distance	Position
Adonson Shallow	Shot put	14.76	14	did not advance	
Adonson Shallow	Discus throw	46.32	6	did not advance	

Key

- Note–Ranks given for track events are within the athlete's heat only
- Q = Qualified for the next round
- q = Qualified for the next round as a fastest loser or, in field events, by position without achieving the qualifying target
- NR = National record
- N/A = Round not applicable for the event
- Bye = Athlete not required to compete in round

== Netball ==
Saint Vincent and the Grenadines finished 11th in the netball at the 2006 Commonwealth Games. In the 11th/12th playoff, they defeated Singapore 52–46.

Pool 1

Friday 17 March; 15:00 (UTC+11)	Report; Stats	Saint Vincent and the Grenadines	31–98	New Zealand	Umpires: Bill Alexander; Jackie Jashari; Reserve umpire: Michelle Phippard
Friday 17 March; 15:00 (UTC+11)	Report; Stats	Scoring by quarter: 3-29, 12-22, 5-27, 11-20			Umpires: Bill Alexander; Jackie Jashari; Reserve umpire: Michelle Phippard
Friday 17 March; 15:00 (UTC+11)	Report; Stats	Galeine Gordon 27/34 (79%); Samathea Christopher 2/3 (67%); Nicole Sandy 2/4 (50%)		Irene van Dyk 48/49 (98%); Maria Tutaia 24/26 (92%); Belinda Colling 18/21 (86%); Jessica Tuki 8/16 (50%)	Umpires: Bill Alexander; Jackie Jashari; Reserve umpire: Michelle Phippard

Sunday 19 March; 15:00 (UTC+11)	Stats	South Africa	80–34	Saint Vincent and the Grenadines	Umpires: Sharon Kelly; Chris Campbell; Reserve umpire: Pauline Sciascia
Sunday 19 March; 15:00 (UTC+11)	Stats	Scoring by quarter: 15-10, 23-8, 19-8, 23-8			Umpires: Sharon Kelly; Chris Campbell; Reserve umpire: Pauline Sciascia
Sunday 19 March; 15:00 (UTC+11)	Stats	Sindisiwe Gumede 41/49 (84%); Christine Markgraaff 31/41 (76%); Lizanne Helmand 6/8 (75%); Nthabiseng Moabi 2/2 (100%)		Galeine Gordon 18/20 (90%); Nicole Sandy 9/13 (69%); Samathea Christopher 7/10 (70%)	Umpires: Sharon Kelly; Chris Campbell; Reserve umpire: Pauline Sciascia

Monday 20 March; 18:30 (UTC+11)	Report; Stats	England	78–18	Saint Vincent and the Grenadines	Umpires: Stacey Campton; Amanda Nottingham; Reserve umpire: Carolene Logan
Monday 20 March; 18:30 (UTC+11)	Report; Stats	Scoring by quarter: 20-6, 23-3, 19-6, 16-3			Umpires: Stacey Campton; Amanda Nottingham; Reserve umpire: Carolene Logan
Monday 20 March; 18:30 (UTC+11)	Report; Stats	Louisa Brownfield 26/30 (87%); Abby Teare 16/20 (80%); Rachel Dunn 14/15 (93%); Pamela Cookey 13/17 (76%); Ama Agbeze 9/17 (53%)		Samathea Christopher 14/19 (74%); Nicole Sandy 2/5 (40%); Galeine Gordon 2/7 (29%)	Umpires: Stacey Campton; Amanda Nottingham; Reserve umpire: Carolene Logan

Tuesday 21 March; 13:00 (UTC+11)	Stats	Saint Vincent and the Grenadines	44–66	Malawi	Umpires: Michelle Phippard; Jacqui Jashari; Reserve umpire: Amanda Nottingham
Tuesday 21 March; 13:00 (UTC+11)	Stats	Scoring by quarter: 8-19, 14-17, 9-14, 13-16			Umpires: Michelle Phippard; Jacqui Jashari; Reserve umpire: Amanda Nottingham
Tuesday 21 March; 13:00 (UTC+11)	Stats	Galeine Gordon 36/40 (90%); Nicole Sandy 5/8 (63%); Leeanna Lewis 3/6 (50%)		Linda Magombo 48/50 (96%); Emma Mzagada 15/19 (79%); Mary Waya 3/4 (75%)	Umpires: Michelle Phippard; Jacqui Jashari; Reserve umpire: Amanda Nottingham

Thursday 23 March; 11:00 (UTC+11)	Stats	Fiji	58–44	Saint Vincent and the Grenadines	Umpires: Bobbi Brown; Stacey Campton; Reserve umpire: Pauline Sciascia
Thursday 23 March; 11:00 (UTC+11)	Stats	Scoring by quarter: 13-10, 15-12, 16-11, 14-11			Umpires: Bobbi Brown; Stacey Campton; Reserve umpire: Pauline Sciascia
Thursday 23 March; 11:00 (UTC+11)	Stats	Matelita Shaw 32/38 (84%); Laniana Tuisasa 26/28 (93%)		Galeine Gordon 26/33 (79%); Samathea Christopher 15/16 (94%); Nicole Sandy 3/5 (60%)	Umpires: Bobbi Brown; Stacey Campton; Reserve umpire: Pauline Sciascia

Table

Pos	Team	P	W	D	L	GF	GA	GD	Pts
1	New Zealand	5	5	0	0	374	173	+201	10
2	England	5	4	0	1	308	196	+112	8
3	Malawi	5	3	0	2	262	282	-20	6
4	South Africa	5	2	0	3	264	283	-19	4
5	Fiji	5	1	0	4	228	293	-65	2
6	Saint Vincent and the Grenadines	5	0	0	5	171	380	-209	0

Qualified for Semi-finals
Qualified for Classification

11th/12th playoff

Friday 24 March; 13:00 (UTC+11)	Stats	Singapore	46–52	Saint Vincent and the Grenadines	Umpires: Chris Campbell; Marion Johnson-Hurley; Reserve umpire: Carolene Logan
Friday 24 March; 13:00 (UTC+11)	Stats	Scoring by quarter: 15-12, 10-10, 13-15, 8-15			Umpires: Chris Campbell; Marion Johnson-Hurley; Reserve umpire: Carolene Logan
Friday 24 March; 13:00 (UTC+11)	Stats	Tan Hui Yan 30/50 (60%); Jeanine Heng Wei Ping 9/15 (60%); Li Ling 7/9 (78%)		Galeine Gordon 27/32 (84%); Samathea Christopher 22/23 (96%); Nicole Sandy 3/4 (75%)	Umpires: Chris Campbell; Marion Johnson-Hurley; Reserve umpire: Carolene Logan

Squad

Saint Vincent and the Grenadines roster
Players
Coaches

Name	Pos	DOB	Height	Club	Nat	Caps
Jacintha Adams	GD	24 June 1973 (aged 32)	1.71 m (5 ft 7 in)
Genella Andrews	WD	12 October 1973 (aged 32)	1.77 m (5 ft 10 in)
Joeana Christopher	GS, GK	12 September 1975 (aged 30)	1.89 m (6 ft 2 in)
Saska Diamond	C	28 May 1986 (aged 19)	1.68 m (5 ft 6 in)
Dellerice Duncan (c)	WA	10 August 1970 (aged 35)	1.65 m (5 ft 5 in)
Galeine Gordon	GS, GA	10 January 1985 (aged 21)	1.56 m (5 ft 1 in)
Marcia Gordon	GK, GD	31 January 1987 (aged 19)	1.55 m (5 ft 1 in)
Annette King	GK, GD	20 July 1976 (aged 29)	1.92 m (6 ft 4 in)
Leeanna Lewis	WD, WA, GA	9 August 1987 (aged 18)	1.77 m (5 ft 10 in)
Annella Samuel	WD	9 August 1987 (aged 18)	1.62 m (5 ft 4 in)
Nicole Sandy	GA, GS	17 July 1979 (aged 26)	1.65 m (5 ft 5 in)
Michelle Wiseman	C	23 September 1975 (aged 30)	1.56 m (5 ft 1 in)

Head coach

- Godfrey Harry

Notes

- (c) – Captain
- (cc) – Co-captain
- (vc) – Vice-captain
- – Injury / maternity leave
- (TRP) – Temporary Replacement Player
