= Corey Ollivierre =

Grenadian swimmer (born 1997)

Personal information
- National team: Grenada
- Born: 16 March 1997 (age 29) Port of Spain, Trinidad and Tobago

Sport
- Sport: Swimming

Corey Ollivierre (born 16 March 1997) is a Grenadian swimmer. He competed in the men's 100 metre breaststroke event at the 2016 Summer Olympics, where he ranked 46th with a time of 1:08.68. He did not advance to the semifinals. He also competed in three events at the 2018 Commonwealth Games.
