= List of flag bearers for Saint Vincent and the Grenadines at the Olympics =

Saint Vincent and the Grenadines at the Olympics
- IOC code: VIN
- NOC: Saint Vincent and the Grenadines Olympic Committee
- Website: www.svgnoc.org
- Medals: Gold 0 Silver 0 Bronze 0 Total 0

Summer appearances
- 1988; 1992; 1996; 2000; 2004; 2008; 2012; 2016; 2020; 2024

This is a list of flag bearers who have represented Saint Vincent and the Grenadines at the Olympics.

Flag bearers carry the national flag of their country at the opening ceremony of the Olympic Games.

#	Event year	Season	Flag bearer	Sport
1	1988	Summer	Orde Ballantyne	Athletics
2	1992	Summer		
3	1996	Summer	Eswort Coombs	Athletics
4	2000	Summer	Pamenos Ballantyne	Athletics
5	2004	Summer	Natasha Mayers	Athletics
6	2008	Summer	Kineke Alexander	Athletics
7	2012	Summer	Kineke Alexander	Athletics
8	2016	Summer	Kineke Alexander	Athletics
9	2020	Summer	Shafiqua Maloney	Athletics
10	2024	Summer	Alex Joachim	Swimming
10	2024	Summer	Shafiqua Maloney	Athletics

== See also ==
- Saint Vincent and the Grenadines at the Olympics
