= Saint Vincent and the Grenadines at the 1996 Summer Olympics =

- IOC code: VIN
- NOC: Saint Vincent and the Grenadines Olympic Committee
- Website: www.svgnoc.org

in Atlanta
- Competitors: 8 (7 men and 1 woman) in 1 sport
- Flag bearer: Eswort Coombs
- Medals: Gold 0 Silver 0 Bronze 0 Total 0

Summer Olympics appearances (overview)
- 1988; 1992; 1996; 2000; 2004; 2008; 2012; 2016; 2020; 2024

Saint Vincent and the Grenadines competed at the 1996 Summer Olympics in Atlanta, United States with eight track and field athletes.

== Competitors ==
The following is the list of number of competitors in the Games.

Sport	Men	Women	Total
Athletics	7	1	8
Total	7	1	8

== Athletics ==
Men

Athlete	Event	Heat		Quarterfinal		Semifinal		Final	
Athlete	Event	Result	Rank	Result	Rank	Result	Rank	Result	Rank
Joel Mascoll	100 m	10.64	5	did not advance					
Eswort Coombs	400 m	45.84	1 Q	45.43	4 q	45.36	6	did not advance	
Pamenos Ballantyne	marathon	n/a						2-34.16	95
Kambon Sampson; Joel Mascoll; Eswort Coombs; Kahlil Cato	4 × 100 m relay	40.54	6	n/a		did not advance			
Eswort Coombs; Thomas Dickson; Eversley Linley; Kambon Sampson	4 × 400 m relay	3:06.52	5	n/a		did not advance			

Women

Athlete	Event	Heat		Quarterfinals		Semifinal		Final	
Athlete	Event	Result	Rank	Result	Rank	Result	Rank	Result	Rank
Natalie Martindale	100 m	12.25	8	did not advance					

Key

- Note–Ranks given for track events are within the athlete's heat only
- Q = Qualified for the next round
- q = Qualified for the next round as a fastest loser or, in field events, by position without achieving the qualifying target
- NR = National record
- N/A = Round not applicable for the event
- Bye = Athlete not required to compete in round

== See also ==
- Saint Vincent and the Grenadines at the 1994 Commonwealth Games
- Saint Vincent and the Grenadines at the 1995 Pan American Games
- Saint Vincent and the Grenadines at the 1998 Commonwealth Games
