= List of Vincentian records in athletics =

The following are the national records in athletics in Saint Vincent and the Grenadines maintained by the country's national athletics federation: Team Athletics Saint Vincent & The Grenadines (TASVG).

== Outdoor ==
Key to tables: Awaiting ratification Record not kept by TASVG Not ratified or later rescinded by TASVG

=== Men ===
Event	Record	Athlete	Date	Meet	Place	Ref.
100 m	10.13 (+1.7 m/s)	Earl Simmonds	25 May 2024	JAAA All Comers Series #2	Kingston, Jamaica	
200 m	20.76 (+1.0 m/s)	Eswort Coombs	19 May 1995	NJCAA Championships	Odessa, United States	
200 m	20.59 (+1.7 m/s)	Joel Mascoll	11 April 1998	Norfolk Relays	Norfolk, United States	
200 m	20.59 (+0.6 m/s)	Courtney Williams	6 June 2015	Texas State University Friday All Night Lights All Comers Meet	United States	
400 m	45.19	Eswort Coombs	20 April 1997	Mt. SAC Relays	Walnut, United States	
800 m	1:42.87	Handal Roban	16 August 2025	NACAC Championships	Freeport, Bahamas	
1500 m	3:46.20	Nicol-Samuel Delohnni	19 June 2016		London, Canada	
3000 m	8:54.66	Nicol-Samuel Delohnni	10 August 2008	Legion National Youth Championship	Sherbrooke, Canada	
5000 m	14:31.5 h	Pamenos Ballantyne	14 June 1998		London, United Kingdom	
10,000 m	29:58.3 h	Pamenos Ballantyne	19 July 1998		Derby, United Kingdom	
10 km (road)	29:49	Pamenos Ballantyne	4 December 1999		Bridgetown, Barbados	
Half marathon	1:05:43.0 h	Pamenos Ballantyne	15 September 2002	Toronto Waterfront Half Marathon	Toronto, Canada	
Marathon	2:15:30	Pamenos Ballantyne	26 January 2003	Clico International Marathon	Port of Spain, Trinidad and Tobago	
110 m hurdles	16.65 (+0.2 m/s)	Ronald De-Bique	19 July 2015	SW Inter Counties Championships	Exeter, United Kingdom	
400 m hurdles	51.70	Fitz-Allen Crick	19 July 2003	USATF Club Championships	Bloomington, United States	
3000 m steeplechase	9:39.65	DeLohnni Nicol-Samuel	18 March 2011	Shamrock Invitational	Conway, United States	
High jump	2.09 m	Zimbert Bramble	11 April 2015	Pittsburg State Gorilla Classic	Pittsburg, United States	
Pole vault	3.80 m	Tedre O'Neil	9 April 2023	CARIFTA Games	Nassau, Bahamas	
Long jump	8.08 m (+1.2 m/s)	Clayton Latham	29 July 2008	Hamburg Open	Hamburg, United States	
Triple jump	16.09 m (−0.1 m/s)	Jumonne Exeter	12 April 2018	Commonwealth Games	Gold Coast, Australia	
Shot put	18.57 m	Adonson Shallow	28 May 2010	NCAA Division I East Region Prelims	Greensboro, United States	
Discus throw	59.77 m	Adonson Shallow	1 May 2010	Northwestern State Invitational	Natchitoches, United States	
Hammer throw	70.41 m	Adonson Shallow	18 April 2013	Southeastern Louisiana Lion Invitational	Hammond, United States	
Javelin throw	60.97 m	Adonson Shallow	14 May 2010	Southland Conference Outdoor Championships	Arlington, United States	
Decathlon	4759 pts	Godwyn Roban	8–9 April 2022	Osprey Open and Multi	Pomona, United States	
Decathlon	100m / Long jump / Shot put / High jump / 400m / 110m H / Discus / Pole vault / Javelin / 1500m; 11.21 (−0.2 m/s) / 6.26 m (±0.0 m/s) / 12.25 m / 1.82 m / 52.70 / 20.10 (±0.0 m/s) / NM / 2.95 m / 41.20 m / 6:18.03					
4 × 100 m relay	40.02	McKish Compton; Javon Rawlins; Earl Simmons; Sage Primus	26 February 2022	McCook/Gibson Relays	Kingston, Jamaica	
4 × 400 m relay	3:06.52	Saint Vincent and the Grenadines; Eswort Coombs; Thomas Dickson; Eversley Linley; Kambon Sampson	2 August 1996	Olympic Games	Atlanta, United States	

=== Women ===
Event	Record	Athlete	Date	Meet	Place	Ref.
100 m	11.09 (+0.6 m/s)	Natasha Joe-Mayers	21 April 2002	Mt. SAC Relays	Walnut, United States	
100 m	11.09 (+0.8 m/s)	Natasha Joe-Mayers	19 April 2003	Mt. SAC Relays	Walnut, United States	
200 m	22.80 (+1.4 m/s)	Natasha Joe-Mayers	29 May 2002	NCAA Division I Championships	Baton Rouge, United States	
400 m	50.63	Shafiqua Maloney	14 July 2024	Meeting Internazionale Sport e Solidarieta	Lignano Sabbiadoro, Italy	
600 m	1:22.98	Shafiqua Maloney	1 September 2024	ISTAF Berlin	Berlin, Germany	
800 m	1:57.29	Shafiqua Maloney	28 August 2025	Weltklasse Zürich	Zurich, Switzerland	
1500 m	4:20.78	Bigna Samuel	17 April 1994	Mt. SAC Relays	Walnut, United States	
3000 m	9:31.37	Bigna Samuel	15 April 1994	Mt. SAC Relays	Walnut, United States	
Half marathon	1:27:41	Linda McDowald	30 April 2016		Les Abymes, Guadeloupe	
Marathon	3:18:44	Adelaide Carrington	26 January 2003	Clico Marathon	Port of Spain, Trinidad and Tobago	
100 m hurdles	13.92	Yvette Haynes	10 May 1992		Minneapolis, United States	
400 m hurdles	57.62	Odeshia Nanton	25 May 2024	NCAA Division II Championships	Emporia, United States	
High jump	1.73 m	Marvette Collis	14 May 1994	Orange Empire Conference	San Diego, United States	
Pole vault						
Long jump	6.21 m	Marvette Collis	7 May 1994		San Diego, United States	
Triple jump	14.01 m	Mikeisha Welcome	2023			
Triple jump	14.07 m	Mikeisha Welcome	15 April 2023	Mt. SAC Relays	Walnut, United States	
Shot put	12.94 m	Jacqueline Ross	21 May 1988		Bridgetown, Barbados	
Discus throw	39.18 m	Jenita Lewis	3 June 1990		Bridgetown, Barbados	
Hammer throw	43.14 m	Nikelene McLean	22 April 2016	Baltimore, United States		
Javelin throw	31.90 m	Shanique DeShong	29 July 2007		Portsmouth, Dominica	
Heptathlon	4847 pts h	Jacqueline Ross	15–16 May 1991		Bozeman, United States	
Heptathlon	100m H / High jump / Shot put / 200m / Long jump / Javelin / 800m; 15.6 / 12.85 m / 1.52 m / 25.98 / 5.99 m / 35.38 m / 2:44.0					
20 km walk (road)						
50 km walk (road)						
4 × 100 m relay	48.21	Saint Vincent and the Grenadines; Yakka Farrell; Simone Nanton-Hendrickson; Curlan Francis; Karen Richards	13 April 1998	CARIFTA Games	Port of Spain, Trinidad and Tobago	
4 × 400 m relay	3:48.24	Saint Vincent and the Grenadines; Annicea Richards; Shafiqua Maloney; Zita Vincent; Tamara Woodley	2 April 2018	CARIFTA Games	Nassau, Bahamas	

== Indoor ==
=== Men ===
Event	Record	Athlete	Date	Meet	Place	Ref.
60 m	6.73	Kemroy Cupid	20 February 2021	KCAC Championships	Wichita, United States	
60 m	6.72	Jared Lewis	3 March 2006	NJCAA Championships	Manhattan, United States	
200 m	21.70	Fitz-Allen Crick	26 January 2002	Terrier Open	Boston, United States	
200 m	21.11 OT	Joel Mascoll	22 February 1998	MEAC Championships	Johnson City, United States	
400 m	46.89	Eswort Coombs	20 January 1996	Terrier Cup	Allston, United States	
600 m	1:14.89	Handal Roban	7 February 2026	Sykes Sabock Challenge	State College, United States	
800 m	1:44.73	Handal Roban	14 February 2026	Sound Invite	Winston-Salem, United States	
1000 m	2:24.08	Handal Roban	14 January 2023	Nittany Lion Challenge	State College, United States	
1500 m	3:59.95	Delohnni Nicol-Samuel	27 January 2018	23nd McGill Team Challenge	Montréal, Canada	
Mile	4:19.52	Delohnni Nicol-Samuel	12 February 2013		Winston-Salem, United States	
3000 m	8:26.20 (Note: outdoor mark ratified as absolute record)	Delohnni Nicol-Samuel	27 January 2018	23nd McGill Team Challenge	Montréal, Canada	
5000 m	14:45.93	Delohnni Nicol-Samuel	30 January 2015		Winston-Salem, United States	
60 m hurdles						
High jump	2.01 m	Zimbert Bramble	14 February 2015	OBSU Bison Invitational	Norman, United States	
Pole vault						
Long jump	7.85 m	Clayton Latham	24 January 2010	Ontario Masters Winter Mini Meet	Toronto, Canada	
Long jump	8.04 m	Uroy Ryan	13 March 2026	NCAA Division I Championships	Fayetteville, United States	
Triple jump	16.04 m	Dwight Joseph	20 February 1999	MEAC Championships	Princess Anne, United States	
Shot put	18.34 m	Adonson Shallow	27 February 2010	Southland Conference Championships	Norman, United States	
Weight throw	22.33 m	Adonson Shallow	4 March 2011	LSU NCAA Indoor Qualifier	Baton Rouge, United States	
Heptathlon						
Heptathlon	60m / Long jump / Shot put / High jump / 60m H / Pole vault / 1000m					
5000 m walk						
4 × 400 m relay						

=== Women ===
Event	Record	Athlete	Date	Meet	Place	Ref.
60 m	7.18 A	Natasha Joe-Mayers	9 February 2002	Mountain Invitational	Flagstaff, United States	
200 m	23.24	Kineke Alexander	14 February 2015	Tyson Invitational	Fayetteville, United States	
300 m	37.82	Kineke Alexander	1 March 2014		Birmingham, United States	
400 m	51.48	Kineke Alexander	10 March 2007	NCAA Division I Championships	Fayetteville, United States	
800 m	1:58.69	Shafiqua Maloney	10 February 2024	Tyson Invitational	Fayetteville, United States	
1000 m	2:41.22	Shafiqua Maloney	12 January 2024	Arkansas Invitational	Fayetteville, United States	
1500 m	4:23.16	Bigna Samuel	11 March 1995		Indianapolis, United States	
3000 m						
60 m hurdles						
High jump						
Pole vault						
Long jump	6.07 m	Jacqueline Ross	1991			
Triple jump	13.40 m A	Mikeisha Welcome	26 February 2021	Big 12 Championships	Lubbock, United States	
Triple jump	13.74 m	Mikeisha Welcome	25 February 2023	SEC Championships	Fayetteville, United States	
Triple jump	14.21 m A	Mikeisha Welcome	11 March 2023	NCAA Division I Championships	Albuquerque, United States	
Shot put						
Pentathlon						
Pentathlon	60m H / High jump / Shot put / Long jump / 800m					
3000 m walk						
4 × 400 m relay						
