= Saint Vincent and the Grenadines at the 1992 Summer Olympics =

- IOC code: VIN
- NOC: Saint Vincent and the Grenadines Olympic Committee

in Barcelona
- Competitors: 6 (4 men and 2 women) in 1 sport
- Medals: Gold 0 Silver 0 Bronze 0 Total 0

Summer Olympics appearances (overview)
- 1988; 1992; 1996; 2000; 2004; 2008; 2012; 2016; 2020; 2024

Saint Vincent and the Grenadines competed at the 1992 Summer Olympics in Barcelona, Spain. They used six track and field athletes.

== Competitors ==
The following is the list of number of competitors in the Games.

Sport	Men	Women	Total
Athletics	4	2	6
Total	4	2	6

== Athletics ==
Key

- Note–Ranks given for track events are within the athlete's heat only
- Q = Qualified for the next round
- q = Qualified for the next round as a fastest loser or, in field events, by position without achieving the qualifying target
- NR = National record
- N/A = Round not applicable for the event
- Bye = Athlete not required to compete in round

Men

Athlete	Event	Heat		Quarterfinal		Semifinal		Final	
Athlete	Event	Result	Rank	Result	Rank	Result	Rank	Result	Rank
Eswort Coombs	200 m	22.07	5	did not advance					
Eversley Linley	800 m	1:52.49	5	n/a		did not advance			
Lenford O'Garro; Michael Williams; Eversley Linley; Eswort Coombs	4 × 400 m relay	3:10.21	7	n/a				did not advance	

Women

Athlete	Event	Heat		Quarterfinals		Semifinal		Final	
Athlete	Event	Result	Rank	Result	Rank	Result	Rank	Result	Rank
Gail Prescod	100 m	12.41	7	did not advance					
Bigna Samuel	1500 m	4:33.41	13	n/a		did not advance			

== See also ==
- Saint Vincent and the Grenadines at the 1991 Pan American Games
