= Saint Vincent and the Grenadines at the 2023 World Aquatics Championships =

- Flag of Saint Vincent and the Grenadines
- FINA code: VIN
- National federation: St. Vincent and the Grenadines Swimming Federation
- Website: svgswimming.com

in Fukuoka, Japan
- Competitors: 4 in 1 sport
- Medals: Gold 0 Silver 0 Bronze 0 Total 0

World Aquatics Championships appearances
- 1973; 1975; 1978; 1982; 1986; 1991; 1994; 1998; 2001; 2003; 2005; 2007; 2009; 2011; 2013; 2015; 2017; 2019; 2022; 2023; 2024

Saint Vincent and the Grenadines is set to compete at the 2023 World Aquatics Championships in Fukuoka, Japan from 14 to 30 July.

== Swimming ==
Saint Vincent and the Grenadines entered 4 swimmers.

Men

Athlete	Event	Heat		Semifinal		Final	
Athlete	Event	Time	Rank	Time	Rank	Time	Rank
Shane Cadogan	50 metre freestyle	24.59	80	Did not advance			
Shane Cadogan	50 m breaststroke	30.23	49	Did not advance			
Alex Joachim	100 metre freestyle	52.78	80	Did not advance			
Alex Joachim	50 metre butterfly	25.58 NR	62	Did not advance			

Women

Athlete	Event	Heat		Semifinal		Final	
Athlete	Event	Time	Rank	Time	Rank	Time	Rank
Mya de Freitas	100 metre freestyle	1:02.19	61	Did not advance			
Mya de Freitas	200 metre freestyle	2:16.22	62	Did not advance			
Kennice Greene	50 metre freestyle	28.23	67	Did not advance			
Kennice Greene	50 metre butterfly	29.90	50	Did not advance			
