= Saint Vincent and the Grenadines at the 2024 Summer Olympics =

- IOC code: VIN
- NOC: Saint Vincent and the Grenadines Olympic Committee
- Website: www.svgnoc.org

in Paris, France 26 July 2024 – 11 August 2024
- Competitors: 4 (2 men and 2 women) in 2 sports
- Flag bearers (opening): Alex Joachim & Shafiqua Maloney
- Flag bearer (closing): N/A
- Officials: Stephen Joachim (President of NOC)
- Medals: Gold 0 Silver 0 Bronze 0 Total 0

Summer Olympics appearances (overview)
- 1988; 1992; 1996; 2000; 2004; 2008; 2012; 2016; 2020; 2024

Saint Vincent and the Grenadines competed at the 2024 Summer Olympics in Paris from 26 July to 11 August 2024. It was the nation's tenth consecutive appearance at the Summer Olympics, since the nation's official debut at the 1988.

== Competitors ==
The following is the list of number of competitors in the Games.

Sport	Men	Women	Total
Athletics	1	1	2
Swimming	1	1	2
Total	2	2	4

== Athletics ==
Saint Vincent and the Grenadines track and field athletes qualified for Paris 2024, either by passing the direct qualifying mark (or time for track and road races), by world ranking, or universality places; in the following events (a maximum of 3 athletes each):

Key

- Note–Ranks given for track events are within the athlete's heat only
- Q = Qualified for the next round
- q = Qualified for the next round as a fastest loser or, in field events, by position without achieving the qualifying target
- NR = National record
- N/A = Round not applicable for the event
- Bye = Athlete not required to compete in round

Track & road events

Athlete	Event	Heat		Repechage		Semifinal		Final	
Athlete	Event	Result	Rank	Result	Rank	Result	Rank	Result	Rank
Handal Roban	Men's 800 m	1:46.00	4	1:45.80	4	Did not advance			
Shafiqua Maloney	Women's 800 m	1:58.23	3 Q	Bye		1:57:59 NR	2	1:57.66	4

Maloney competed in the Women's 800m Final with a time of 1:57:66, falling just behind Kenya's Mary Moraa, Tsige Duguma from Ethiopia, and Keely Hodgkinson from Great Britain. This was the closest a Vincentian had come to winning a medal at the 2024 Summer Olympics.

== Swimming ==
Saint Vincent and the Grenadines sent two swimmers to compete at the 2024 Paris Olympics.

Athlete	Event	Heat		Semifinal		Final	
Athlete	Event	Time	Rank	Time	Rank	Time	Rank
Alex Joachim	Men's 50 m freestyle	23.59	45	Did not advance			
Kennice Greene	Women's 50 m freestyle	27.23	42	Did not advance			

Qualifiers for the latter rounds (Q) of all events were decided on a time only basis, therefore positions shown are overall results versus competitors in all heats.

== See also ==
- Saint Vincent and the Grenadines at the 2023 Pan American Games
