= Saint Vincent and the Grenadines at the 1988 Summer Olympics =

- IOC code: VIN
- NOC: Saint Vincent and the Grenadines Olympic Committee

in Seoul
- Competitors: 6 (5 men and 1 woman) in 1 sport
- Flag bearer: Orde Ballantyne
- Medals: Gold 0 Silver 0 Bronze 0 Total 0

Summer Olympics appearances (overview)
- 1988; 1992; 1996; 2000; 2004; 2008; 2012; 2016; 2020; 2024

Saint Vincent and the Grenadines competed in the Olympic Games for the first time at the 1988 Summer Olympics in Seoul, South Korea. The nation only participated in track and field, sending three track and three field athletes for a total number of six competitors.

== Competitors ==
The following is the list of number of competitors in the Games.

Sport	Men	Women	Total
Athletics	5	1	6
Total	5	1	6

== Athletics ==
André François competed for Saint Vincent and the Grenadines as its first ever competitor in the Olympic men's 200 meters race. He was born in July 1964, and was 24 years old at the time he competed at the Seoul games of 1988. François had not previously competed at any Olympic games, and had not competed at any games afterwards. The qualification round of François' event took place on September 26, with the Vincentian competing in the sixth heat against seven other athletes. He finished the race in 21.88 seconds, placing seventh in the heat. François scored ahead of Ismail Asif of the Maldives (23.17 seconds) and behind Abdullah Al-Khalidi of Oman (21.82 seconds) in a heat led by Kenya's Kennedy Ondiek (20.79 seconds) and Troy Douglas of Bermuda (20.91 seconds). Overall, François tied Aouf Abdul Rahman Youssef of Iraq for 50th place out of the 71 athletes who finished the event and ranked. He did not advance to later rounds.

Men

Athlete	Events	Heat		Quarterfinal		Semifinal		Final	
Athlete	Events	Result	Rank	Result	Rank	Result	Rank	Result	Rank
André François	200m	21.88	7	did not advance					
Michael Williams	400m	51.22	7	did not advance					
Eversley Linley	800m	1:51.71	6	did not advance					

Men
Field Events

Athlete	Event	Qualification		Final	
Athlete	Event	Distance	Position	Distance	Position
Orde Ballantyne	Long Jump	NM		did not advance	
Lennox Adams	Triple jump	14.73	38	did not advance	

Women
Field Events

Athlete	Event	Qualification		Final	
Athlete	Event	Distance	Position	Distance	Position
Jacqueline Ross	Long Jump	5.50	26	did not advance	
