= Saint Vincent and the Grenadines at the 2022 World Athletics Championships =

- Flag of Saint Vincent and the Grenadines
- WA code: VIN

in Eugene, United States 15 July 2022 – 24 July 2022
- Competitors: 1 (1 woman)
- Medals: Gold 0 Silver 0 Bronze 0 Total 0

World Athletics Championships appearances (overview)
- 1983; 1987; 1991; 1993; 1995; 1997; 1999; 2001; 2003; 2005; 2007; 2009; 2011; 2013; 2015; 2017; 2019; 2022; 2023; 2025

Saint Vincent and the Grenadines competed at the 2022 World Athletics Championships in Eugene, Oregon, United States, which were held from 15 to 24 July 2022. The athlete delegation of the country was composed of one competitor, middle-distance runner Shafiqua Maloney. Maloney qualified upon being selected by the nation's athletics federation. She competed in the women's 800 metres and failed to make it past the qualifying heats.

== Background ==
The 2022 World Athletics Championships in Eugene, Oregon, United States, were held from 15 to 24 July 2022. To qualify for the World Championships, athletes had to reach an entry standard (e.g. time and distance), place in a specific position at select competitions, be a wild card entry, or qualify through their World Athletics Ranking at the end of the qualification period.

As Saint Vincent and the Grenadines did not meet any of the four standards, they could send either one male or one female athlete in one event of the Championships who has not yet qualified. The Team Athletics Saint Vincent & The Grenadines selected middle-distance runner Shafiqua Maloney who held a personal and season's best of 2:01.58 in the women's 800 metres, her entered event. She was ranked 88th in the World Athletics Rankings prior to the World Championships.

== Results ==
Key

- Q = Qualified for the next round
- q = Qualified for the next round as a fastest loser or, in field events, by position without achieving the qualifying target
- NR = National record
- PB = Personal best
- SB = Season best
- N/A = Round not applicable for the event

=== Women ===
Maloney competed in the qualifying heats of the women's 800 metres on 21 July 2022 in the fourth heat against six other competitors. There, she recorded a time of 2:03.00 and placed sixth, failing to advance to the semifinals as the top three athletes of each heat and the next six fastest athletes would only be able to do so.

Track and road events

Athlete	Event	Heat		Semi-final		Final	
Athlete	Event	Result	Rank	Result	Rank	Result	Rank
Shafiqua Maloney	800 metres	2:03.00	35	Did not advance			
