= Saint Vincent and the Grenadines at the 2019 World Aquatics Championships =

- Flag of Saint Vincent and the Grenadines
- FINA code: VIN
- National federation: St. Vincent and the Grenadines Swimming Federation

in Gwangju, South Korea
- Competitors: 3 in 1 sport
- Medals: Gold 0 Silver 0 Bronze 0 Total 0

World Aquatics Championships appearances
- 1973; 1975; 1978; 1982; 1986; 1991; 1994; 1998; 2001; 2003; 2005; 2007; 2009; 2011; 2013; 2015; 2017; 2019; 2022; 2023; 2024

Saint Vincent and the Grenadines competed at the 2019 World Aquatics Championships in Gwangju, South Korea from 12 to 28 July.

== Swimming ==
Saint Vincent and the Grenadines entered three swimmers.

Men

Athlete	Event	Heat		Semifinal		Final	
Athlete	Event	Time	Rank	Time	Rank	Time	Rank
Shane Cadogan	50 m freestyle	24.80	89	did not advance			
Shane Cadogan	50 m breaststroke	30.73	63	did not advance			
Alex Joachim	100 m freestyle	54.96	94	did not advance			
Alex Joachim	100 m breaststroke	1:08.14	80	did not advance			

Women

Athlete	Event	Heat		Semifinal		Final	
Athlete	Event	Time	Rank	Time	Rank	Time	Rank
Mya de Freitas	100 m freestyle	1:03.91	78	did not advance			
Mya de Freitas	200 m freestyle	2:15.48	54	did not advance			
