= Saint Vincent and the Grenadines at the 2012 Summer Olympics =

- IOC code: VIN
- NOC: Saint Vincent and the Grenadines Olympic Committee
- Website: www.svgnoc.org

in London
- Competitors: 3 in 2 sports
- Flag bearers: Kineke Alexander (opening); Courtney Carl Williams (closing)
- Medals: Gold 0 Silver 0 Bronze 0 Total 0

Summer Olympics appearances (overview)
- 1988; 1992; 1996; 2000; 2004; 2008; 2012; 2016; 2020; 2024; 2028

During the 2012 Summer Olympics in London, United Kingdom, Saint Vincent and the Grenadines appeared in their seventh consecutive Summer Olympics. The country sent three competitors to their team with wild card entries. Athlete Kineke Alexander reprised her role as the nation's flag bearer for the second time at the opening ceremony. As Alexander entered her second Olympics, athlete Courtney Carl Williams and swimmer Tolga Akcayli debuted at the 2012 Olympics. For Saint Vincent and the Grenadines, none of the country's competitors advanced past their individual heats. In overall standings, Akcayli had the highest 2012 Olympic finish for Saint Vincent and the Grenadines when he placed 45th in the men's 50 metre freestyle.

== Background ==
The Saint Vincent and the Grenadines Olympic Committee was created in 1982 and became a member of the International Olympic Committee in 1987. After the country was granted Olympic membership, Saint Vincent and the Grenadines debuted at the 1988 Summer Olympics. Leading up to 2012, the country competed in five consecutive Summer Olympics after 1988. Three competitors, two coaches and four sports executives were chosen as the country's 2012 Olympic team.

As part of the Olympic team, athlete Kineke Alexander returned as the country's opening ceremony flag bearer. Alexander had previously competed in athletics at the 2008 Summer Olympics and was the nation's flag bearer at the 2008 opening and closing ceremonies. Courtney Carl Williams made his Olympic debut in athletics at the 2012 Olympics and was the flag bearer in the closing ceremony. Apart from athletics, Tolga Akcayli represented Saint Vincent and the Grenadines in swimming at his first Olympics.

== Athletics ==
Courtney Carl Williams went into the men's 100 metres event with a personal best time of 11.04 seconds. Williams was given a non-qualified place in the men's 100 metres after his time was 0.8 seconds slower than the B standard qualifying time. At the Olympic Stadium in London, England, Williams raced in heat four of the preliminary rounds on 4 August. During his heat, Williams finished third with a time of 10.80 seconds. With his heat finish and overall time, Williams did not qualify for the first round. Out of 75 athletes, Williams finished the event overall in 57th place.

Kineke Alexander entered the women's 400 metres with a qualifying best time of 52.57 seconds. As her time was 0.22 seconds slower than the B standard qualifying time, Alexander received a non-qualified Olympic spot. On 3 August at the Olympic Stadium, Williams did not finish the sixth heat. With her DNF, Williams did not advance to the semi-finals. Overall, Alexander was tied for 46th place out of 49 athletes.

Key

- Note–Ranks given for track events are within the athlete's heat only

Men

| Athlete | Event | Heat | | Quarterfinal | | Semifinal | | Final | |
| Athlete | Event | Result | Rank | Result | Rank | Result | Rank | Result | Rank |
|---|---|---|---|---|---|---|---|---|---|
| Courtney Carl Williams | 100 m | 10.80 | 3 | Did not advance | | | | | |

Women

| Athlete | Event | Heat | | Semifinal | | Final | |
| Athlete | Event | Result | Rank | Result | Rank | Result | Rank |
|---|---|---|---|---|---|---|---|
| Kineke Alexander | 400 m | DNF | | Did not advance | | | |

== Swimming ==
Tolga Akcayli had a qualifying time of 25.65 seconds in the men's 50m freestyle and entered the Olympics with a universality spot. His time was 2.77 seconds slower than the B standard Olympic invitation time. As a requirement to receive a universality place, Akcayli had competed at the 2011 FINA World Championships prior to the Olympic Games. On 2 August at the London Aquatics Centre, Akcayli finished the third heat in fifth place. With a time of 26.27 seconds, Akcayli did not reach the semi-finals as one of the top sixteen quickest heat competitors. After the Olympic freestyle final was completed, Akcayli was 45th out of 58 overall entries.

Men

| Athlete | Event | Heat | | Semifinal | | Final | |
| Athlete | Event | Time | Rank | Time | Rank | Time | Rank |
|---|---|---|---|---|---|---|---|
| Tolga Akcayli | 50 m freestyle | 26.27 | 5 | Did not advance | | | |
