= Saint Vincent and the Grenadines at the World Athletics Championships =

- WA code: VIN
- National federation: Team Athletics Saint Vincent & The Grenadines
- Website: svgnoc.org/blog/category/news/athletics/
- Medals: Gold 0 Silver 0 Bronze 0 Total 0

World Athletics Championships appearances (overview)
- 1983; 1987; 1991; 1993; 1995; 1997; 1999; 2001; 2003; 2005; 2007; 2009; 2011; 2013; 2015; 2017; 2019; 2022; 2023; 2025

Saint Vincent and the Grenadines has competed at every edition of the World Athletics Championships. Its competing country code is VIN. The country has not won any medals at the competition and as of 2017 none of the country's athletes has reached the final of an event. Sprinters Kineke Alexander and Natasha Mayers have both competed in a World Championships semi-final.
