= Saint Vincent and the Grenadines at the 2008 Summer Olympics =

- IOC code: VIN
- NOC: Saint Vincent and the Grenadines Olympic Committee
- Website: www.svgnoc.org

in Beijing
- Competitors: 2 in 1 sports
- Flag bearer: Kineke Alexander
- Medals: Gold 0 Silver 0 Bronze 0 Total 0

Summer Olympics appearances (overview)
- 1988; 1992; 1996; 2000; 2004; 2008; 2012; 2016; 2020; 2024; 2028

Saint Vincent and the Grenadines sent a delegation to compete at the 2008 Summer Olympics in Beijing, China. The year's team included two athletes engaged in track and field events (Kineke Alexander and Jared Lewis), and was accompanied by the team coach, manager, and chaperone. Saint Vincent and the Grenadines' appearance in Beijing marked its sixth consecutive Olympic appearance since its 1988 debut in Seoul, South Korea, and its smallest delegation to date. Alexander bore the flag of Saint Vincent and the Grenadines in the opening ceremony and neither athlete medaled in their events or advanced to later rounds.

== Background ==
Saint Vincent and the Grenadines debuted in the Olympic Games at the 1988 Summer Olympics in Seoul, South Korea and, as of 2008, has participated in every edition since. The Beijing Games marked the smallest Vincentian delegation in the country's history, the size having declined over the years from its largest delegation of eight participants at the 1996 Summer Olympics in Atlanta. At the conclusion of the 2008 Summer Olympics, Saint Vincent and the Grenadines' team has yet to medal in an event. The delegation arrived in Beijing on 28 July 2008, and stayed in the Olympic Village for the duration of their time in China. The Vincentians arrived early, three days after the Village itself opened, to make adjusting to the new environment easier. The delegation was accompanied by coach Gideon Labban; team manager Leroy Llewellyn; and chaperone Jacintha Ballantyne. Kineke Alexander was the flagbearer at the opening ceremony, leading Saint Vincent and the Grenadines as the 64th nation in line.

== Athletics ==
The athletes competing on behalf of Saint Vincent and the Grenadines competed in track and field. Kineke Alexander participated in the women's 400 m sprint, while Jared Lewis took part in the men's 100 m sprint. Neither medaled or advanced to subsequent rounds.

Men

Mississauga Track and Field Club member Jared Lewis qualified for the men's 100 m sprint. At the Beijing Olympics, the first round of Lewis' event took place on 14 August. Lewis was placed in Heat 3, competing against athletes such as Trinidad and Tobago's Richard Thompson, who would later win silver in the event. Lewis ran his event in 11.00 seconds, ranking seventh among of eight competitors, 0.29 seconds ahead of Kiribati's Rabangaki Nawai and 0.54 seconds slower than Indonesia's Suryo Agung Wibowo. Thompson, who took first place in the heat, was 0.76 seconds faster than Lewis. Overall, Lewis tied Danny D'Souza of the Seychelles for 63rd place out of 80 people and did not advance to the second round, which took place on the same day.

| Athlete | Event | Heat | | Quarterfinal | | Semifinal | | Final | |
| Athlete | Event | Result | Rank | Result | Rank | Result | Rank | Result | Rank |
|---|---|---|---|---|---|---|---|---|---|
| Jared Lewis | 100 m | 11.00 | 7 | Did not advance | | | | | |

Women

University of Iowa student Kineke Alexander qualified for the 400 m sprint, an event in which she earned eight all-American honors during college competitions. Her participation in the Beijing Olympics marked her Olympic debut. At the Games Alexander competed in the first round of the event on 16 August. She was placed in Heat 6 and ranked fourth, completing the race in 52.87 seconds. She was 0.01 seconds faster than Grenada's Trish Bartholomew (5th place), 0.10 seconds slower than Sudan's Nawal El Jack (3rd place), and 1.35 seconds slower than heat leader Novelene Williams of Jamaica. Overall, in the first round, Alexander ranked 32 out of 50 competitors, finishing just ahead of Bartholomew and India's Mandeep Kaur and just behind Poland's Monika Bejnar. The overall round one leader, the United States' Sanya Richards, ran 2.33 seconds faster than Alexander. Alexander did not advance to the semifinal round, as she was neither in the top three places in her given heat nor in the top three fastest of those who did fall below third place in their heats.

| Athlete | Event | Heat | | Semifinal | | Final | |
| Athlete | Event | Result | Rank | Result | Rank | Result | Rank |
|---|---|---|---|---|---|---|---|
| Kineke Alexander | 400 m | 52.87 | 4 | Did not advance | | | |

Key

- Note–Ranks given for track events are within the athlete's heat only
- Q = Qualified for the next round
- q = Qualified for the next round as a fastest loser or, in field events, by position without achieving the qualifying target
- NR = National record
- N/A = Round not applicable for the event
- Bye = Athlete not required to compete in round

== See also ==
- Saint Vincent and the Grenadines at the 2006 Commonwealth Games
- Saint Vincent and the Grenadines at the 2007 Pan American Games
- Saint Vincent and the Grenadines at the 2010 Central American and Caribbean Games
- Saint Vincent and the Grenadines at the 2010 Commonwealth Games
