= Kahlil Cato =

Vincentian sprinter (born 1977)

Personal information
- Born: 10 March 1977 (age 49)

Sport
- Country: Saint Vincent and the Grenadines
- Sport: Athletics

Kahlil Cato (born 10 March 1977) is a Vincentian sprinter who competed at the 1996 Summer Olympics.

Cato competed in the 4×100 metres relay at the 1996 Summer Olympics with teammates Kambon Sampson, Joel Mascoll and Eswort Coombs, they ran in heat one and finished sixth out of eight and missed out qualifying for the next round by just over one second.

He later went on to attend Missouri Valley College and graduated in 2001 with a B.A. in Mass Communications.
