= Saint Vincent and the Grenadines at the 2020 Summer Olympics =

- Flag of Saint Vincent and the Grenadines
- IOC code: VIN
- NOC: Saint Vincent and the Grenadines Olympic Committee
- Website: www.svgolympic.org

in Tokyo, Japan 23 July – 8 August 2021
- Competitors: 3 in 2 sports
- Flag bearer: Shafiqua Maloney
- Medals: Gold 0 Silver 0 Bronze 0 Total 0

Summer Olympics appearances (overview)
- 1988; 1992; 1996; 2000; 2004; 2008; 2012; 2016; 2020; 2024; 2028

Saint Vincent and the Grenadines competed at the 2020 Summer Olympics in Tokyo, Japan, from 23 July to 8 August 2021. It was the nation's ninth appearance at the Summer Olympics, since its debut at the 1988 Summer Olympics in Seoul. The delegation consisted of three athletes competing in two sports. Saint Vincent and the Grenadines did not win any medals at the Games.

== Background ==
The Saint Vincent and the Grenadines Olympic Committee was founded in 1982 and recognized by the International Olympic Committee (IOC) on 17 May 1987 at the IOC Session in Istanbul. The nation made its first Olympic appearance at the 1988 Summer Olympics in Seoul and has competed at every subsequent Summer Olympics. It was the nation's ninth appearance at the Summer Olympics, since its debut. Saint Vincent and the Grenadines has never won an Olympic medal.

The 2020 Summer Olympics were held in Tokyo, Japan, between 23 July and 8 August 2021. Originally scheduled to take place from 24 July to 9 August 2020, the Games were postponed due to the COVID-19 pandemic. Shafiqua Maloney served as the flag-bearer for Saint Vincent and the Grenadines at the opening ceremony. None of the three athletes won a medal.

== Competitors ==
The delegation consisted of middle-distance runner Shafiqua Maloney and two swimmers, Shane Cadogan and Mya De Freitas.

Sport	Men	Women	Total
Athletics	0	1	1
Swimming	1	1	2
Total	1	2	3

== Athletics ==
As per the governing body World Athletics (WA), a NOC was allowed to enter up to three qualified athletes in each individual event and one qualified relay team if the Olympic Qualifying Standards (OQS) for the respective events had been met during the qualifying period. The remaining places were allocated based on the World Athletics Rankings which were derived from the average of the best five results for an athlete over the designated qualifying period, weighted by the importance of the meet. Shafiqua Maloney was awarded a universality place by World Athletics to compete in the women's 800 m event. Prior to Tokyo, Maloney had broken the national outdoor 800 m record with a time of 2:02.54 at the Tom Jones Memorial, and won the 800 m gold and 400 m silver at the 2021 NACAC U23 Championships.

The athletics events were held at the Japan National Stadium in Tokyo. In the women's 800 m, she finished seventh in her opening heat with a time of 2:07.89 seconds and did not advance to the semifinals.

Key

- Note–Ranks given for track events are within the athlete's heat only
- Q = Qualified for the next round
- q = Qualified for the next round as a fastest loser or, in field events, by position without achieving the qualifying target
- NR = National record
- N/A = Round not applicable for the event
- Bye = Athlete not required to compete in round

Track & road events

Athlete	Event	Heat		Semifinal		Final	
Athlete	Event	Result	Rank	Result	Rank	Result	Rank
Shafiqua Maloney	Women's 800 m	2:07.89	7	Did not advance			

== Swimming ==
As per the Fédération internationale de natation (FINA) guidelines, a NOC was permitted to enter a maximum of two qualified athletes in each individual event, who have achieved the Olympic Qualifying Time (OQT). If the quota was not filled, one athlete per event was allowed to enter, provided they achieved the Olympic Selection Time (OST). The qualifying time standards should have been achieved in competitions approved by World Aquatics in the period between 1 March 2019 to 27 June 2021. FINA allowed NOCs to enter swimmers (one per gender) under a universality place even if they had not achieved the standard entry times. Saint Vincent and the Grenadines received a universality invitation from FINA to send two top-ranked swimmers (one per gender) in their respective individual events to the Olympics, based on the FINA Points System of 28 June 2021. Shane Cadogan and Mya De Freitas represented the nation in the Olympics.

The swimming events were held at the Tokyo Aquatics Centre. Shane Cadogan competed in the men's 50 m freestyle event. Though he topped the fourth heat with a time of 24.71 seconds, he finished 49th overall and did not advance to the semifinals. Mya De Freitas was the youngest member of the team, and competed in the women's 50 m freestyle event. She finished 59th in the preliminary heat rankings and did not advance past the heats.

Athlete	Event	Heat		Semifinal		Final	
Athlete	Event	Time	Rank	Time	Rank	Time	Rank
Shane Cadogan	Men's 50 m freestyle	24.71	49	Did not advance			
Mya de Freitas	Women's 50 m freestyle	28.57	59	Did not advance			

== See also ==
- Saint Vincent and the Grenadines at the 2016 Summer Olympics
- Saint Vincent and the Grenadines at the 2024 Summer Olympics
