= Saint Vincent and the Grenadines at the 2009 World Championships in Athletics =

- WA code: VIN

in Berlin
- Competitors: 2
- Medals: Gold 0 Silver 0 Bronze 0 Total 0

World Championships in Athletics appearances (overview)
- 1983; 1987; 1991; 1993; 1995; 1997; 1999; 2001; 2003; 2005; 2007; 2009; 2011; 2013; 2015; 2017; 2019; 2022; 2023; 2025

Saint Vincent and the Grenadines competed at the 2009 World Championships in Athletics in Berlin, Germany, which were held from 15 to 23 August 2009. The athlete delegation consisted of two competitors, long jumper Clayton Latham and sprinter Kineke Alexander. Latham failed all of his attempts in the qualifiers of the men's long jump and thus did not advance to the finals while Alexander went up until the semifinals of the women's 400 metres.

== Background ==
The 2009 World Championships in Athletics were held at the Olympiastadion in Berlin, Germany. Under the auspices of the International Amateur Athletic Federation, this was the twelfth edition of the World Championships. It was held from 15 to 23 August 2009 and had 47 different events. Among the competing teams was Saint Vincent and the Grenadines. For this edition of the World Championships in Athletics, long jumper Clayton Latham and sprinter Kineke Alexander competed for the nation.

== Results ==
=== Men ===
Latham competed in the qualification round of the men's long jump on 20 August 2009 in the Group B against 21 other long jumpers. There, Latham failed all of his attempts, resulting him being recorded with no mark and failing to advance to the finals of the event.

Event	Athletes	Qualification		Final	
Event	Athletes	Result	Rank	Result	Rank
Long jump	Clayton Latham	NM	-	did not advance	

=== Women ===
Alexander competed in the qualifying heats of the women's 400 metres on 15 August 2009 in the second heat against six other competitors. There, she recorded a time of 52.44 seconds for a new season's best, placing fourth and advancing further as her time was fast enough despite being outside of the top three of her heat. In the semifinals held the following day, Alexander competed in the first semifinal against eight other competitors. There, she recorded a time of 53.43 seconds and placed seventh, failing to reach the finals of the event.

Event	Athletes	Heats		Semifinal		Final	
Event	Athletes	Result	Rank	Result	Rank	Result	Rank
400 m	Kineke Alexander	52.44 SB	4	53.43	7	did not advance	
