= Athletics at the 1996 Summer Olympics – Men's 4 × 100 metres relay =

These are the official results of the men's 4 × 100 metres relay event at the 1996 Summer Olympics in Atlanta, Georgia. There were 37 nations competing. Canada won the gold medal with the United States claiming the silver and Brazil taking the bronze.

== Medalists ==
| Gold | Silver | Bronze |
|---|---|---|
| Canada; Robert Esmie; Glenroy Gilbert; Bruny Surin; Donovan Bailey; Carlton Chambers* | United States; Jon Drummond; Tim Harden; Michael Marsh; Dennis Mitchell; Tim Montgomery* | Brazil; Arnaldo da Silva; Robson da Silva; Édson Ribeiro; André da Silva |

* Athletes who participated in the heats and or semi final (but not the final) and received medals.

== Results ==
=== Heats ===
Qualification: First 2 in each heat (Q) and the next 6 fastest (q) qualified to the semifinals.

| Rank | Heat | Nation | Athletes | Time | Notes |
|---|---|---|---|---|---|
| 1 | 3 | United States | Jon Drummond, Tim Harden, Tim Montgomery, Dennis Mitchell | 38.58 | Q |
| 2 | 2 | Canada | Carlton Chambers, Glenroy Gilbert, Bruny Surin, Donovan Bailey | 38.68 | Q |
| 3 | 2 | Germany | Michael Huke, Marc Blume, Andreas Ruth, Florian Schwarthoff | 38.77 | Q |
| 4 | 1 | Ukraine | Kostyantyn Rurak, Serhiy Osovych, Oleh Kramarenko, Vladyslav Dolohodin | 38.90 | Q |
| 5 | 5 | Australia | Paul Henderson, Tim Jackson, Steve Brimacombe, Rod Mapstone | 38.93 | Q |
| 6 | 1 | Brazil | Arnaldo da Silva, Robson da Silva, Édson Ribeiro, André da Silva | 38.97 | Q |
| 7 | 2 | Sierra Leone | Pierre Lisk, Tom Ganda, Josephus Thomas, Sanusi Turay | 38.98 | q |
| 8 | 5 | France | Hermann Lomba, Régis Groisard, Pascal Theophile, Needy Guims | 39.00 | Q |
| 9 | 3 | Sweden | Peter Karlsson, Torbjörn Mårtensson, Lars Hedner, Patrik Strenius | 39.02 | Q |
| 10 | 5 | Cuba | Joel Isasi, Joel Lamela, Iván García, Luis Alberto Pérez | 39.14 | q |
| 11 | 4 | Jamaica | Percival Spencer, Michael Green, Leon Gordon, Raymond Stewart | 39.21 | Q |
| 12 | 4 | Spain | Frutos Feo, Venancio José, Jordi Mayoral, Francisco Navarro | 39.35 | Q |
| 13 | 3 | Bahamas | Renward Wells, Joseph Styles, Iram Lewis, Andrew Tynes | 39.38 | q |
| 14 | 4 | Ivory Coast | Frank Waota, Ahmed Douhou, Éric Pacôme N'Dri, Ibrahim Meité | 39.43 | q |
| 15 | 1 | Ghana | Aziz Zakari, Christian Nsiah, Albert Agyemang, Emmanuel Tuffour | 39.47 | q |
| 15 | 1 | Nigeria | Deji Aliu, Osmond Ezinwa, Francis Obikwelu, Davidson Ezinwa | 39.47 | q |
| 17 | 4 | Togo | Téko Folligan, Boevi Lawson, Justin Ayassou, Kossi Akoto | 39.56 | |
| 18 | 5 | Austria | Martin Schützenauer, Martin Lachkovics, Thomas Griesser, Christoph Pöstinger | 39.80 | |
| 18 | 3 | Thailand | Sayan Namwong, Worasit Vechaphut, Kongdech Natenee, Ekkachai Janthana | 39.80 | |
| 20 | 1 | Cameroon | Alfred Moussambani, Benjamin Sirimou, Issa-Aimé Nthépé, Claude Toukéné-Guébogo | 39.81 | |
| 21 | 4 | Gabon | Patrick Mocci-Raoumbe, Antoine Boussombo, Charles Tayot, Eric Ebang | 39.97 | |
| 22 | 5 | Cyprus | Loucas Spyrou, Anninos Marcoullides, Prodromos Katsantonis, Yiannis Zisimides | 40.06 | |
| 23 | 2 | Saint Kitts and Nevis | Ricardo Liddie, Bertram Haynes, Kim Collins, Alain Maxime Isaiah | 40.12 | |
| 24 | 5 | Liberia | Kouty Mawenh, Sayon Cooper, Eddie Neufville, Robert Dennis | 40.18 | |
| 25 | 3 | Fiji | Solomone Bole, Jone Delai, Henry Rogo, Soloveni Nakaunicina | 40.23 | |
| 26 | 1 | Saint Vincent and the Grenadines | Erasto Sampson, Joel Mascoll, Eswort Coombs, Kahlil Cato | 40.54 | |
| 27 | 4 | Benin | Arcadius Fanou, Pascal Dangbo, Issa Alassane Ousseni, Eric Agueh | 40.79 | |
| 28 | 1 | Mauritius | Arnaud Casquette, Dominique Méyépa, Bruno Potanah, Barnabe Jolicoeur | 40.92 | |
| 29 | 5 | British Virgin Islands | Ralston Varlack, Keita Cline, Willys Todman, Mario Todman | 41.26 | |
| 30 | 4 | The Gambia | Momodou Sarr, Dawda Jallow, Cherno Sowe, Pa Modou Gai | 41.80 | |
| 31 | 1 | Laos | Poutavanh Phengthalangsy, Thongdy Amnouayphone, Sisomphone Vongpharkdy, Souliyasak Ketkeolatsami | 44.14 | |
| 32 | 2 | Equatorial Guinea | Ponciano Mbomio, Casimiro Nze, Bonifacio Edu, Gus Envela, Jr. | 45.63 | |
| | 3 | Great Britain | Tony Jarrett, Darren Braithwaite, Darren Campbell, Owusu Dako | DNF | |
| | 2 | Papua New Guinea | Allan Akia, Peter Pulu, Amos Ali, Subul Babo | DNF | |
| | 4 | Italy | Giovanni Puggioni, Ezio Madonia, Angelo Cipolloni, Sandro Floris | DNF | |
| | 5 | Greece | Alexandros Yenovelis, Thomas Sbokos, George Panayiotopoulos, Alexandros Alexopoulos | DQ | |
| | 2 | Japan | Koji Ito, Hiroyasu Tsuchie, Satoru Inoue, Nobuharu Asahara | DQ | |
| | 2 | New Zealand | Chris Donaldson, Mark Keddell, Augustine Nketia, Matthew Coad | DNS | |
| | 3 | Qatar | | DNS | |

=== Semifinals ===
Qualification: First 4 in each heat (Q) qualified directly to the final.

| Rank | Heat | Nation | Athletes | Time | Notes |
|---|---|---|---|---|---|
| 1 | 2 | United States | Jon Drummond, Tim Harden, Tim Montgomery, Dennis Mitchell | 38.06 | Q |
| 2 | 1 | Canada | Carlton Chambers, Glenroy Gilbert, Bruny Surin, Donovan Bailey | 38.36 | Q |
| 3 | 1 | Brazil | Arnaldo da Silva, Robson da Silva, Édson Ribeiro, André da Silva | 38.42 | Q |
| 4 | 2 | Cuba | Joel Isasi, Joel Lamela, Iván García, Luis Alberto Pérez | 38.55 | Q |
| 5 | 1 | Ukraine | Kostyantyn Rurak, Serhiy Osovych, Oleh Kramarenko, Vladyslav Dolohodin | 38.56 | Q |
| 6 | 1 | Ghana | Aziz Zakari, Eric Nkansah, Albert Agyemang, Emmanuel Tuffour | 38.62 | Q |
| 7 | 2 | Sweden | Peter Karlsson, Torbjörn Mårtensson, Lars Hedner, Patrik Strenius | 38.63 | Q |
| 8 | 2 | France | Hermann Lomba, Régis Groisard, Pascal Theophile, Needy Guims | 38.82 | Q |
| 9 | 1 | Sierra Leone | Pierre Lisk, Tom Ganda, Josephus Thomas, Sanusi Turay | 38.91 | |
| 10 | 1 | Spain | Frutos Feo, Venancio José, Jordi Mayoral, Francisco Navarro | 38.91 | |
| 11 | 1 | Ivory Coast | Frank Waota, Ahmed Douhou, Éric Pacôme N'Dri, Ibrahim Meité | 38.99 | |
| | 1 | Germany | Michael Huke, Marc Blume, Holger Blume, Florian Schwarthoff | DNF | |
| | 2 | Nigeria | Deji Aliu, Osmond Ezinwa, Francis Obikwelu, Davidson Ezinwa | DNF | |
| | 2 | Australia | Paul Henderson, Tim Jackson, Steve Brimacombe, Rod Mapstone | DQ | |
| | 2 | Bahamas | Renward Wells, Dwight Ferguson, Iram Lewis, Andrew Tynes | DQ | |
| | 2 | Jamaica | Leon Gordon, Michael Green, Percival Spencer, Raymond Stewart | DQ | |

=== Final ===
| Rank | Lane | Nation | Athletes | Time | Notes |
|---|---|---|---|---|---|
| 1st place, gold medalist(s) | 6 | Canada | Robert Esmie, Glenroy Gilbert, Bruny Surin, Donovan Bailey | 37.69 | |
| 2nd place, silver medalist(s) | 4 | United States | Jon Drummond, Tim Harden, Michael Marsh, Dennis Mitchell | 38.05 | |
| 3rd place, bronze medalist(s) | 3 | Brazil | Arnaldo da Silva, Robson da Silva, Édson Ribeiro, André da Silva | 38.41 | |
| 4 | 7 | Ukraine | Kostyantyn Rurak, Serhiy Osovych, Oleh Kramarenko, Vladyslav Dolohodin | 38.55 | |
| 5 | 2 | Sweden | Peter Karlsson, Torbjörn Mårtensson, Lars Hedner, Patrik Strenius | 38.67 | |
| 6 | 5 | Cuba | Andrés Simón, Joel Lamela, Joel Isasi, Luis Alberto Pérez | 39.39 | |
| | 8 | France | Hermann Lomba, Régis Groisard, Pascal Theophile, Needy Guims | DNF | |
| | 1 | Ghana | Aziz Zakari, Christian Nsiah, Albert Agyemang, Emmanuel Tuffour | DNS | |

== See also ==
- Women's 4 × 100 m Relay
