= Saint Vincent and the Grenadines at the 2011 World Championships in Athletics =

- WA code: VIN
- National federation: Team Athletics Saint Vincent & The Grenadines
- Website: www.svgnoc.org

in Daegu
- Competitors: 1
- Medals: Gold 0 Silver 0 Bronze 0 Total 0

World Championships in Athletics appearances (overview)
- 1983; 1987; 1991; 1993; 1995; 1997; 1999; 2001; 2003; 2005; 2007; 2009; 2011; 2013; 2015; 2017; 2019; 2022; 2023

Saint Vincent and the Grenadines competed at the 2011 World Championships in Athletics from August 27 to September 4 in Daegu, South Korea.

== Team selection ==
A team of 2 athletes was announced to represent the country in the event. However, the following athlete did not appear on the Official Start List, resulting in only one competitor:

KEY:	Did not participate	Competed in another event

	Event	Athlete
Men	100 metres	Courtney Carl Williams

== Results ==
=== Women ===
Athlete	Event	Preliminaries		Heats		Semifinals		Final	
Athlete	Event	Time Width Height	Rank	Time Width Height	Rank	Time Width Height	Rank	Time Width Height	Rank
Natasha Mayers	100 metres			DNS		Did not advance			
