= Saint Vincent and the Grenadines at the 2013 World Championships in Athletics =

- WA code: VIN

in Moscow
- Competitors: 3
- Medals: Gold 0 Silver 0 Bronze 0 Total 0

World Championships in Athletics appearances (overview)
- 1983; 1987; 1991; 1993; 1995; 1997; 1999; 2001; 2003; 2005; 2007; 2009; 2011; 2013; 2015; 2017; 2019; 2022; 2023

Saint Vincent and the Grenadines is competing at the 2013 World Championships in Athletics in Moscow, Russia, from 10–18 August 2013. A team of 3 athletes was announced to represent the country in the event.

== Results ==
(q – qualified, NM – no mark, SB – season best)

=== Men ===
| Athlete | Event | Preliminaries | | Heats | | Semifinals | | Final | |
| Athlete | Event | Time | Rank | Time | Rank | Time | Rank | Time | Rank |
|---|---|---|---|---|---|---|---|---|---|
| Courtney Carl Williams | 200 metres | | | 21.98 | 49 | did not advance | | | |

=== Women ===
| Athlete | Event | Preliminaries | | Heats | | Semifinals | | Final | |
| Athlete | Event | Time | Rank | Time | Rank | Time | Rank | Time | Rank |
|---|---|---|---|---|---|---|---|---|---|
| Kineke Alexander | 200 metres | | | 23.42 | 34 | did not advance | | | |
| Kineke Alexander | 400 metres | | | 51.62 SB | 14 Q | 51.64 | 15 | did not advance | |
