= Saint Vincent and the Grenadines at the 2000 Summer Olympics =

- IOC code: VIN
- NOC: Saint Vincent and the Grenadines Olympic Committee
- Website: www.svgnoc.org

in Sydney
- Competitors: 4 (2 men and 2 women) in 2 sports
- Flag bearer: Pamenos Ballantyne
- Medals: Gold 0 Silver 0 Bronze 0 Total 0

Summer Olympics appearances (overview)
- 1988; 1992; 1996; 2000; 2004; 2008; 2012; 2016; 2020; 2024

Saint Vincent and the Grenadines was represented at the 2000 Summer Olympics in Sydney, New South Wales, Australia by the Saint Vincent and the Grenadines Olympic Committee.

In total, four athletes including two men and two women represented Saint Vincent and the Grenadines in two different sports including athletics and swimming.

== Background ==
Saint Vincent and the Grenadines made their Olympic debut at the 1988 Summer Olympics in Seoul, South Korea. The 2000 Summer Olympics in Sydney, New South Wales, Australia marked their fourth appearance at the Olympics. The delegation of four athletes was the smallest delegation sent by Saint Vincent and the Grenadines to the Olympics. At the previous edition, the 1996 Summer Olympics in Atlanta Georgia, United States had seen a record delegation of eight athletes.

== Competitors ==
In total, four athletes represented Saint Vincent and the Grenadines at the 2000 Summer Olympics in Sydney, New South Wales, Australia across two different sports.

Sport	Men	Women	Total
Athletics	1	1	2
Swimming	1	1	2
Total	2	2	4

== Athletics ==
In total, two Vincentian and Grenadinian athletes participated in the athletics events – Pamenos Ballantyne in the men's marathon and Natasha Mayers in the women's 100 m.

The athletics events took place at the Sydney Olympic Stadium in Sydney Olympic Park, Sydney from 22 September – 1 October 2000.

Men

Athlete	Event	Final	
Athlete	Event	Result	Rank
Pamenos Ballantyne	marathon	2-19.08	31

Women

Athlete	Event	Heat		Quarterfinals		Semifinal		Final	
Athlete	Event	Result	Rank	Result	Rank	Result	Rank	Result	Rank
Natasha Mayers	100 m	11.61	4	did not advance					

== Swimming ==
In total, two Vincentian and Grenadinian athletes participated in the swimming events – Stephenson Wallace in the men's 50 m freestyle and Teran Matthews in the women's 50 m freestyle.

The swimming events took place at the Sydney Olympic Park Aquatic Centre in Sydney Olympic Park, Sydney from 16–23 September 2000.

Men

Athlete	Event	Heat		Semifinal		Final	
Athlete	Event	Time	Rank	Time	Rank	Time	Rank
Stephenson Wallace	50 m freestyle	27.84	72	Did not advance			

Women

Athlete	Event	Heat		Semifinal		Final	
Athlete	Event	Time	Rank	Time	Rank	Time	Rank
Teran Matthews	50 m freestyle	31.71	67	Did not advance			

== See also ==
- Saint Vincent and the Grenadines at the 1998 Commonwealth Games
- Saint Vincent and the Grenadines at the 1999 Pan American Games
- Saint Vincent and the Grenadines at the 2002 Commonwealth Games
