= Saint Vincent and the Grenadines at the Olympics =

- IOC code: VIN
- NOC: Saint Vincent and the Grenadines Olympic Committee
- Website: www.svgnoc.org
- Medals: Gold 0 Silver 0 Bronze 0 Total 0

Summer appearances
- 1988; 1992; 1996; 2000; 2004; 2008; 2012; 2016; 2020; 2024; 2028

Saint Vincent and the Grenadines has appeared in 10 Summer Olympic Games. The nation has never participated in the Winter Olympic Games. To date, no athlete from Saint Vincent and the Grenadines has ever won an Olympic medal. Their best Olympic result as of 2024 is a fourth-place finish in the Women's 800m in Athletics by Shafiqua Maloney at the 2024 Summer Olympics.

The St Vincent and the Grenadines National Olympic Committee was formed in 1982 and recognized by the IOC in 1987.

== Medal tables ==
=== Medals by Summer Games ===
Games	Athletes	Gold	Silver	Bronze	Total	Rank
1988 Seoul	6	0	0	0	0	–
1992 Barcelona	6	0	0	0	0	–
1996 Atlanta	8	0	0	0	0	–
2000 Sydney	4	0	0	0	0	–
2004 Athens	3	0	0	0	0	–
2008 Beijing	2	0	0	0	0	–
2012 London	3	0	0	0	0	–
2016 Rio de Janeiro	4	0	0	0	0	–
2020 Tokyo	3	0	0	0	0	–
2024 Paris	4	0	0	0	0	–
2028 Los Angeles	future event					
2032 Brisbane	future event					
Total		0	0	0	0	–

== See also ==
- List of flag bearers for Saint Vincent and the Grenadines at the Olympics
