= List of Vincentian records in swimming =

The Vincentian records in swimming are the fastest ever performances of swimmers from Saint Vincent and the Grenadines, which are recognised and ratified by the Saint Vincent and the Grenadines Swimming Federation (SVGSF).

All records were set in finals unless noted otherwise.

== Long Course (50 m) ==
=== Men ===
Event	Time		Name	Club	Date	Meet	Location	Ref
50 m freestyle	24.67	h	Matthew Ballah	Saint Vincent and the Grenadines	12 August 2025	Junior Pan American Games	Asunción, Paraguay	
100 m freestyle	54.96	h	Alex Joachim	Saint Vincent and the Grenadines	24 July 2019	World Championships	Gwangju, South Korea	
200 m freestyle	2:05.06		Hazen Dabriel	Saint Vincent and the Grenadines	5 April 2026	CARIFTA Championships	Le Lamentin, Martinique	
400 m freestyle	4:29.78		Hazen Dabriel	Blue Marlins	20 February 2026	BASA National Championships	Bridgetown, Barbados	
800 m freestyle	9:53.28		Hazen Dabriel	Blue Marlins	25 May 2024	Annual Aquatic Centre	Christ Church, Barbados	
1500 m freestyle	19:01.47		Cruz Halbich	BSSS	February 2016	BASA Championships	Bridgetown, Barbados	
50 m backstroke	28.06		Matthew Ballah	Black Sands	11 December 2025	ASATT Invitational	Couva, Trinidad and Tobago	
100 m backstroke	1:01.16		Matthew Ballah	Black Sands	14 December 2025	ASATT Invitational	Couva, Trinidad and Tobago	
200 m backstroke	2:20.54		Hazen Dabriel	Saint Vincent and the Grenadines	7 April 2026	CARIFTA Championships	Le Lamentin, Martinique	
50m breaststroke	30.05	h	Shane Cadogan	Saint Vincent and the Grenadines	22 April 2019	CARIFTA Championships	Bridgetown, Barbados	
100m breaststroke	1:08.14	h	Alex Joachim	Saint Vincent and the Grenadines	21 July 2019	World Championships	Gwangju, South Korea	
200m breaststroke	2:33.46	h	Alex Joachim	Saint Vincent and the Grenadines	20 April 2019	CARIFTA Championships	Bridgetown, Barbados	
50m butterfly	25.58	h	Alex Joachim	Saint Vincent and the Grenadines	23 July 2023	World Championships	Fukuoka, Japan	
100m butterfly	1:01.16		Hazen Dabriel	Blue Marlins	13 December 2025	ASATT Invitational	Couva, Trinidad and Tobago	
200m butterfly	2:24.56	h	Alex Joachim	Saint Vincent and the Grenadines	22 April 2019	CARIFTA Championships	Bridgetown, Barbados	
200m individual medley	2:19.91		Hazen Dabriel	Saint Vincent and the Grenadines	6 April 2026	CARIFTA Championships	Le Lamentin, Martinique	
400m individual medley	5:10.70		Hazen Dabriel	Blue Marlins	19 February 2026	BASA National Championships	Bridgetown, Barbados	
4×100m freestyle relay	3:47.52		Aaron Defreitas; Bryson George; Alex Joachim; Shane Cadogan	Saint Vincent and the Grenadines	20 April 2019	CARIFTA Championships	Bridgetown, Barbados	
4×200m freestyle relay								
4×100m medley relay								

Legend: # – Record awaiting ratification by SVGSF; WR – World record; AM – Americas record; e – equalled existing record;
Records not set in finals: h – heat; sf – semifinal; r – relay 1st leg; rh – relay heat 1st leg; b – B final; † – en route to final mark; so – swim-off; tt – time trial

=== Women ===
Event	Time		Name	Club	Date	Meet	Location	Ref
50 m freestyle	27.01		Izzy Shne Joachim	Saint Vincent and the Grenadines	2 July 2016	CISC	Nassau, Bahamas	
100 m freestyle	1:01.28	h	Kennice Greene	Saint Vincent and the Grenadines	26 July 2026	Commonwealth Games	Glasgow, United Kingdom	
200 m freestyle	2:15.48	h	Mya de Freitas	Saint Vincent and the Grenadines	23 July 2019	World Championships	Gwangju, South Korea	
400 m freestyle	5:28.34		Mya Defreitas	-	October 2017	Titans Aquatic Meet	Bridgetown, Barbados	
800 m freestyle	10:10.46		Mya Defreitas	Saint Vincent and the Grenadines	20 April 2019	CARIFTA Championships	Bridgetown, Barbados	
1500 m freestyle								
50 m backstroke	33.52	h	Izzy Shne Joachim	Saint Vincent and the Grenadines	28 July 2014	Commonwealth Games	Glasgow, Great Britain	
100 m backstroke	1:12.49		Izzy Shne Joachim	Oakville Aquatic Club	2 March 2017	Prairie Winter International	Winnipeg, Canada	
200 m backstroke	2:45.49		Izzy Shne Joachim	-	2016			
50 m breaststroke	33.33		Izzy Shne Joachim	Oakville Aquatic Club	2 March 2017	Prairie Winter International	Winnipeg, Canada	
100 m breaststroke	1:14.64		Izzy Shne Joachim	Saint Vincent and the Grenadines	2 July 2016	CISC	Nassau, Bahamas	
200 m breaststroke	2:45.49		Izzy Shne Joachim	Saint Vincent and the Grenadines	March 2016	CARIFTA Championships	Fort-de-France, Martinique	
50 m butterfly	28.73		Kennice Greene	Saint Vincent and the Grenadines	20 April 2025	CARIFTA Championships	Couva, Trinidad and Tobago	
100 m butterfly	1:11.48	h	Izzy Shne Joachim	Oakville Aquatic Club	4 March 2017	Prairie Winter International	Winnipeg, Canada	
200 m butterfly	2:41.65		Izzy Shne Joachim	-	May 2014			
200 m individual medley								
400 m individual medley								
4×100 m freestyle relay								
4×200 m freestyle relay								
4×100 m medley relay								

Legend: # – Record awaiting ratification by SVGSF; WR – World record; AM – Americas record; e – equalled existing record;
Records not set in finals: h – heat; sf – semifinal; r – relay 1st leg; rh – relay heat 1st leg; b – B final; † – en route to final mark; so – swim-off; tt – time trial

== Short Course (25 m) ==
=== Men ===
Event	Time		Name	Club	Date	Meet	Location	Ref
50 m freestyle	24.31		Hazen Dabriel	Saint Vincent and the Grenadines	9 November 2025	OECS Championships	Ratho Mill, Saint Vincent and the Grenadines	
100 m freestyle	53.39		Hazen Dabriel	Saint Vincent and the Grenadines	8 November 2026	OECS Championships	Castries, Saint Lucia	
200 m freestyle	1:58.83		Hazen Dabriel	Saint Vincent and the Grenadines	7 November 2026	OECS Championships	Castries, Saint Lucia	
400 m freestyle	4:19.44		Hazen Dabriel	Saint Vincent and the Grenadines	7 November 2025	OECS Championships	Ratho Mill, Saint Vincent and the Grenadines	
800 m freestyle								
1500 m freestyle								
50 m backstroke	26.95		Matthew Ballah	Saint Vincent and the Grenadines	9 November 2025	OECS Championships	Ratho Mill, Saint Vincent and the Grenadines	
100 m backstroke	59.15		Matthew Ballah	Saint Vincent and the Grenadines	7 November 2025	OECS Championships	Ratho Mill, Saint Vincent and the Grenadines	
200 m backstroke								
50 m breaststroke	30.42	h, †	Shane Cadogan	Saint Vincent and the Grenadines	11 December 2018	World Championships	Hangzhou, China	
100 m breaststroke	1:05.78	h	Shane Cadogan	Saint Vincent and the Grenadines	11 December 2018	World Championships	Hangzhou, China	
200 m breaststroke	2:40.90	h	Nikolas Sylvester	Saint Vincent and the Grenadines	5 December 2014	World Championships	Doha, Qatar	
50 m butterfly	26.21		Hazen Dabriel	Saint Vincent and the Grenadines	8 November 2026	OECS Championships	Castries, Saint Lucia	
100 m butterfly	58.43		Hazen Dabriel	Saint Vincent and the Grenadines	7 November 2026	OECS Championships	Castries, Saint Lucia	
200 m butterfly	2:19.31		Hazen Dabriel	Blue Marlins	12 April 2024	RHAC Invitational	Gros Islet, Saint Lucia	
100 m individual medley	1:04.61	h	Nikolas Sylvester	Saint Vincent and the Grenadines	6 December 2014	World Championships	Doha, Qatar	
200 m individual medley	2:14.33		Hazen Dabriel	Saint Vincent and the Grenadines	9 November 2025	OECS Championships	Ratho Mill, Saint Vincent and the Grenadines	
400 m individual medley	5:11.55		Hazen Dabriel	Blue Marlins	12 April 2024	RHAC Invitational	Gros Islet, Saint Lucia	
4×50 m freestyle relay								
4×100 m freestyle relay								
4×200 m freestyle relay								
4×50 m medley relay								
4×100 m medley relay								

Legend: # – Record awaiting ratification by SVGSF; WR – World record; AM – Americas record; e – equalled existing record;
Records not set in finals: h – heat; sf – semifinal; r – relay 1st leg; rh – relay heat 1st leg; b – B final; † – en route to final mark; so – swim-off; tt – time trial

=== Women ===
Event	Time		Name	Club	Date	Meet	Location	Ref
50 m freestyle	26.49	h	Izzy Shne Joachim	Saint Vincent and the Grenadines	11 December 2016	World Championships	Windsor, Canada	
100 m freestyle	1:02.05	h	Mya de Freitas	Saint Vincent and the Grenadines	17 December 2021	World Championships	Abu Dhabi, United Arab Emirates	
200 m freestyle								
400 m freestyle								
800 m freestyle								
1500 m freestyle								
50 m backstroke	30.73	h	Izzy Shne Joachim	Saint Vincent and the Grenadines	9 December 2016	World Championships	Windsor, Canada	
100 m backstroke								
200 m backstroke								
50 m breaststroke	32.43	h	Izzy Shne Joachim	Saint Vincent and the Grenadines	6 December 2016	World Championships	Windsor, Canada	
100 m breaststroke	1:14.25	h	Izzy Shne Joachim	Saint Vincent and the Grenadines	9 December 2016	World Championships	Windsor, Canada	
200 m breaststroke								
50 m butterfly	29.07	h	Izzy Shne Joachim	Saint Vincent and the Grenadines	8 December 2016	World Championships	Windsor, Canada	
100 m butterfly								
200 m butterfly								
100 m individual medley	1:06.61	h	Izzy Shne Joachim	Saint Vincent and the Grenadines	8 December 2016	World Championships	Windsor, Canada	
200 m individual medley								
400 m individual medley								
4×50 m freestyle relay								
4×100 m freestyle relay								
4×200 m freestyle relay								
4×50 m medley relay								
4×100 m medley relay								

Legend: # – Record awaiting ratification by SVGSF; WR – World record; AM – Americas record; e – equalled existing record;
Records not set in finals: h – heat; sf – semifinal; r – relay 1st leg; rh – relay heat 1st leg; b – B final; † – en route to final mark; so – swim-off; tt – time trial
