= Saint Vincent and the Grenadines at the 2013 World Aquatics Championships =

- Flag of Saint Vincent and the Grenadines
- FINA code: VIN
- National federation: Saint Vincent and the Grenadines Swimming Association

in Barcelona, Spain
- Competitors: 4 in 1 sports
- Medals: Gold 0 Silver 0 Bronze 0 Total 0

World Aquatics Championships appearances
- 1973; 1975; 1978; 1982; 1986; 1991; 1994; 1998; 2001; 2003; 2005; 2007; 2009; 2011; 2013; 2015; 2017; 2019; 2022; 2023; 2024

Saint Vincent and the Grenadines is competing at the 2013 World Aquatics Championships in Barcelona, Spain between 19 July and 4 August 2013.

== Swimming ==
Swimmers from Saint Vincent and the Grenadines achieved qualifying standards in the following events (up to a maximum of 2 swimmers in each event at the A-standard entry time, and 1 at the B-standard):

Men

Athlete	Event	Heat		Semifinal		Final	
Athlete	Event	Time	Rank	Time	Rank	Time	Rank
Storm Hablich	50 m backstroke	34.20	46	did not advance			
Storm Hablich	100 m breaststroke	1:24.08	75	did not advance			
Nikolas Sylvester	50 m freestyle	28.25	90	did not advance			
Nikolas Sylvester	50 m breaststroke	35.68	76	did not advance			

Women

Athlete	Event	Heat		Semifinal		Final	
Athlete	Event	Time	Rank	Time	Rank	Time	Rank
Shne Joachim	50 m breaststroke	35.76	62	did not advance			
Shne Joachim	100 m breaststroke	1:23.09	59	did not advance			
