= Allan Akia =

Papua New Guinean sprinter (born 1973)

Personal information
- Nationality: Papua New Guinean
- Born: 23 March 1973 (age 53) Samarai, Papua New Guinea

Sport
- Sport: Sprinting
- Event: 4 × 100 metres relay

Allan Akia (born 23 March 1973) is a Papua New Guinean sprinter. He competed in the men's 4 × 100 metres relay at the 1996 Summer Olympics.
