= Torbjörn Mårtensson =

Swedish sprinter

Personal information
- Nationality: Swedish
- Born: 17 February 1972 (age 54)

Sport
- Sport: Sprinting
- Event: 4 × 100 metres relay

Torbjörn Mårtensson (born 17 February 1972) is a Swedish sprinter. He competed in the men's 4 × 100 metres relay at the 1996 Summer Olympics.
