= Saint Vincent and the Grenadines at the 1983 World Championships in Athletics =

- Flag of Saint Vincent and the Grenadines
- WA code: VIN

in Helsinki, Finland August 7–14, 1983
- Competitors: 2 (1 man and 1 woman) in 2 events
- Medals: Gold 0 Silver 0 Bronze 0 Total 0

World Championships in Athletics appearances (overview)
- 1983; 1987; 1991; 1993; 1995; 1997; 1999; 2001; 2003; 2005; 2007; 2009; 2011; 2013; 2015; 2017; 2019; 2022; 2023; 2025

Saint Vincent and the Grenadines competed at the 1983 World Championships in Athletics in Helsinki, Finland, which were held from 7 to 14 August 1983. The athlete delegation consisted of two athletes, sprinter Lenford O'Garro and middle-distance runner Bigna Samuel. They competed in the men's 400 metres and women's 1500 metres, respectively, though neither of them advanced past the qualifying heats of their events.

== Background ==
The 1983 World Championships in Athletics were held at the Helsinki Olympic Stadium in Helsinki, Finland. Under the auspices of the International Amateur Athletics Federation, this was the first edition of the World Championships. It was held from 7 to 14 August 1983 and had 41 different events. Among the competing teams was the nation of Saint Vincent and the Grenadines. For this edition of the World Championships in Athletics, sprinter Lenford O'Garro and middle-distance runner Bigna Samuel competed for the nation. They competed in the men's 400 metres and women's 1500 metres, respectively.

== Men ==
O'Garro competed in the qualifying heats of the men's 400 metres on 7 August in the fourth heat against seven other competitors. There, he recorded a time of 50.25 seconds and placed seventh, failing to advance further as only the top three athletes in each heat and the next eleven fastest athletes would be able to.

Track and road events

Athlete	Event	Heat		Quarterfinal		Semifinal		Final	
Athlete	Event	Result	Rank	Result	Rank	Result	Rank	Result	Rank
Lenford O'Garro	400 metres	50.25	7	Did not advance					

== Women ==
Samuel competed in the qualifying heats of the women's 1500 metres on 14 August in the first heat against eight other competitors. There, she recorded a time of 4:51.35 and placed eighth, failing to advance further to the finals as only the top three of each heat and the three next fastest athletes would be able to.

Track and road events

Athlete	Event	Heat		Final	
Athlete	Event	Result	Rank	Result	Rank
Bigna Samuel	1500 metres	4:51.35	8	Did not advance	
