= Saint Vincent and the Grenadines at the 2015 World Aquatics Championships =

- Flag of Saint Vincent and the Grenadines
- World Aquatics code: VIN
- National federation: Saint Vincent and the Grenadines Swimming Association

in Kazan, Russia
- Competitors: 3 in 1 sport
- Medals: Gold 0 Silver 0 Bronze 0 Total 0

World Aquatics Championships appearances
- 1973; 1975; 1978; 1982; 1986; 1991; 1994; 1998; 2001; 2003; 2005; 2007; 2009; 2011; 2013; 2015; 2017; 2019; 2022; 2023; 2024

Saint Vincent and the Grenadines competed at the 2015 World Aquatics Championships in Kazan, Russia from 24 July to 9 August 2015.

== Swimming ==
Swimmers from Saint Vincent and the Grenadines have achieved qualifying standards in the following events (up to a maximum of 2 swimmers in each event at the A-standard entry time, and 1 at the B-standard):

Men

Athlete	Event	Heat		Semifinal		Final	
Athlete	Event	Time	Rank	Time	Rank	Time	Rank
Shane Cadogan	50 m freestyle	26.70	88	did not advance			
Shane Cadogan	50 m breaststroke	33.14	66	did not advance			
Nikolaos Sylvester	100 m breaststroke	1:13.12	72	did not advance			
Nikolaos Sylvester	50 m butterfly	28.39	64	did not advance			

Women

Athlete	Event	Heat		Semifinal		Final	
Athlete	Event	Time	Rank	Time	Rank	Time	Rank
Izzy Joachim	50 m breaststroke	34.09	51	did not advance			
Izzy Joachim	100 m breaststroke	1:18.28	59	did not advance			
