= Michael Williams (sprinter) =

Vincentian sprinter (born 1971)

Personal information
- Born: 1 June 1971 (age 54)

Sport
- Country: Saint Vincent and the Grenadines
- Sport: Athletics

Michael Williams (born 1 June 1971) is a Vincentian sprinter. He competed at the 1988 Summer Olympics and the 1992 Summer Olympics.

== Career ==
Williams was part of the first Saint Vincent and the Grenadines team to compete at the Summer Olympics in 1988 at Seoul, South Korea, he was the youngest member of the team and at 17 years 116 days he still is the youngest Vincentian to compete at the Summer Olympics to date. In Seoul Williams competed in the 400 metres he ran in heat 6 in a time of 51.22 seconds and came in 7th out of the seven runners so didn't qualify for the next round.

Williams then competed for the UCLA Bruins track and field team, where he was a 1992 and 1994 NCAA Division I Outdoor Track and Field Championships All-American on their 4 × 400 m relay team.

Four years later he was running in his second Summer Olympics this time held in Barcelona, Spain, this time he was competing with teammates Lenford O'Garro, Eversley Linley and Eswort Coombs in the 4 x 400 metres relay, between them they ran in a time of 3:10.21, and finished seventh in there heat after Barbados got disqualified which was 11 seconds behind the USA team which included Michael Johnson, so they didn't qualify for the next round.
