= Saint Vincent and the Grenadines at the 2016 Summer Olympics =

- IOC code: VIN
- NOC: Saint Vincent and the Grenadines Olympic Committee
- Website: www.svgnoc.org

in Rio de Janeiro
- Competitors: 4 in 2 sports
- Flag bearer: Kineke Alexander
- Medals: Gold 0 Silver 0 Bronze 0 Total 0

Summer Olympics appearances (overview)
- 1988; 1992; 1996; 2000; 2004; 2008; 2012; 2016; 2020; 2024

Saint Vincent and the Grenadines competed at the 2016 Summer Olympics in Rio de Janeiro, Brazil, from 5 to 21 August 2016. This was the nation's eighth consecutive appearance at the Summer Olympics.

The St. Vincent and the Grenadines National Olympic Committee sent the nation's largest delegation to the Games since 2000. Four athletes, two per gender, were selected to the roster, competing only in both swimming and track and field. All of them made their Olympic debut in Rio de Janeiro, except for sprinter Kineke Alexander, who spearheaded the delegation at her third straight Games as the oldest and most experienced competitor (aged 30) and the nation's flag bearer in the opening ceremony.

== Athletics (track and field) ==
Athletes from Saint Vincent and the Grenadines have so far achieved qualifying standards in the following athletics events (up to a maximum of 3 athletes in each event):

Key

- Note–Ranks given for track events are within the athlete's heat only
- Q = Qualified for the next round
- q = Qualified for the next round as a fastest loser or, in field events, by position without achieving the qualifying target
- NR = National record
- N/A = Round not applicable for the event
- Bye = Athlete not required to compete in round

Track & road events

Athlete	Event	Heat		Semifinal		Final	
Athlete	Event	Result	Rank	Result	Rank	Result	Rank
Brandon Valentine-Parris	Men's 400 m	47.62	7	did not advance			
Kineke Alexander	Women's 400 m	52.45	7	did not advance			

== Swimming ==
Saint Vincent and the Grenadines have received a Universality invitation from FINA to send two swimmers (one male and one female) to the Olympics.

Athlete	Event	Heat		Semifinal		Final	
Athlete	Event	Time	Rank	Time	Rank	Time	Rank
Nikolas Sylvester	Men's 50 m freestyle	25.64	61	did not advance			
Izzy Joachim	Women's 100 m breaststroke	1:17.37	38	did not advance			

== See also ==
- Saint Vincent and the Grenadines at the 2015 Pan American Games
