= Saint Vincent and the Grenadines at the 2022 World Aquatics Championships =

- Flag of Saint Vincent and the Grenadines
- FINA code: VIN
- National federation: St. Vincent and the Grenadines Swimming Federation

in Budapest, Hungary
- Competitors: 2 in 1 sport
- Medals: Gold 0 Silver 0 Bronze 0 Total 0

World Aquatics Championships appearances
- 1973; 1975; 1978; 1982; 1986; 1991; 1994; 1998; 2001; 2003; 2005; 2007; 2009; 2011; 2013; 2015; 2017; 2019; 2022; 2023; 2024

Saint Vincent and the Grenadines competed at the 2022 World Aquatics Championships in Budapest, Hungary from 18 June to 3 July.

== Swimming ==
Swimmers from Saint Vincent and the Grenadines have achieved qualifying standards in the following events.

Athlete	Event	Heat		Semifinal		Final	
Athlete	Event	Time	Rank	Time	Rank	Time	Rank
Shane Cadogan	Men's 50 m freestyle	24.57	66	did not advance			
Shane Cadogan	Men's 100 m freestyle	55.10	86	did not advance			
Jamie Joachim	Women's 100 m freestyle	1:03.14	49	did not advance			
Jamie Joachim	Women's 100 m backstroke	1:12.76	40	did not advance			
