= Cherno Sowe =

Gambian sprinter

Personal information
- Nationality: Gambian
- Born: 23 November 1978 (age 47)

Sport
- Sport: Sprinting
- Event: 4 × 100 metres relay

Cherno Sowe (born 23 November 1978) is a Gambian sprinter. He competed in the men's 4 × 100 metres relay at the 1996 Summer Olympics.
