= Saint Vincent and the Grenadines at the 2015 World Championships in Athletics =

- WA code: VIN

in Beijing
- Competitors: 1
- Medals: Gold 0 Silver 0 Bronze 0 Total 0

World Championships in Athletics appearances (overview)
- 1983; 1987; 1991; 1993; 1995; 1997; 1999; 2001; 2003; 2005; 2007; 2009; 2011; 2013; 2015; 2017; 2019; 2022; 2023

Saint Vincent and the Grenadines competed at the 2015 World Championships in Athletics in Beijing, China, from 22 to 30 August 2015.

== Results ==
=== Women ===
Track and road events

| Athlete | Event | Heat | | Semifinal | | Final | |
| Athlete | Event | Result | Rank | Result | Rank | Result | Rank |
|---|---|---|---|---|---|---|---|
| Kineke Alexander | 200 metres | 23.30 | 34 | did not advance | | | |
| Kineke Alexander | 400 metres | 52.24 | 31 | did not advance | | | |
