= Loukas Spyrou =

Cypriot sprinter (born 1973)

Personal information
- Nationality: Cypriot
- Born: 20 June 1973 (age 53)

Sport
- Sport: Sprinting
- Event: 4 × 100 metres relay

Loukas Spyrou (Greek: Λουκάς Σπύρου; born 20 June 1973) is a Cypriot sprinter. He competed in the men's 4 × 100 metres relay at the 1996 Summer Olympics.
