= Régis Groisard =

French sprinter

Personal information
- Nationality: French
- Born: 27 July 1973 (age 52)

Sport
- Sport: Sprinting
- Event: 4 × 100 metres relay

Régis Groisard (born 27 July 1973) is a French sprinter. He competed in the men's 4 × 100 metres relay at the 1996 Summer Olympics.
