= Saint Vincent and the Grenadines at the 2004 Summer Olympics =

- IOC code: VIN
- NOC: Saint Vincent and the Grenadines Olympic Committee
- Website: www.svgnoc.org

in Athens
- Competitors: 3 in 2 sports
- Flag bearer: Natasha Mayers
- Medals: Gold 0 Silver 0 Bronze 0 Total 0

Summer Olympics appearances (overview)
- 1988; 1992; 1996; 2000; 2004; 2008; 2012; 2016; 2020; 2024

Saint Vincent and the Grenadines competed at the 2004 Summer Olympics in Athens, Greece from 13 to 29 August 2004.

== Athletics ==
Athletes from Saint Vincent and the Grenadines have so far achieved qualifying standards in the following athletics events (up to a maximum of 3 athletes in each event at the 'A' Standard, and 1 at the 'B' Standard):

Natasha Mayers was the slowest qualifier in the 100 metres, before being forced to abandon the competition at the second round, while Andy Grant avoided the infamy of placing last in the men's 800 metres by only 3 seconds.

Men

| Athlete | Event | Heat | | Semifinal | | Final | |
| Athlete | Event | Result | Rank | Result | Rank | Result | Rank |
|---|---|---|---|---|---|---|---|
| Andy Grant | 800 m | 1:57.08 | 8 | Did not advance | | | |

Women

| Athlete | Event | Heat | | Quarterfinal | | Semifinal | | Final | |
| Athlete | Event | Result | Rank | Result | Rank | Result | Rank | Result | Rank |
|---|---|---|---|---|---|---|---|---|---|
| Natasha Mayers | 100 m | 11.45 | 3 Q | DNS | | Did not advance | | | |

Key

- Note–Ranks given for track events are within the athlete's heat only
- Q = Qualified for the next round
- q = Qualified for the next round as a fastest loser or, in field events, by position without achieving the qualifying target
- NR = National record
- N/A = Round not applicable for the event
- Bye = Athlete not required to compete in round

== Swimming ==
Men

| Athlete | Event | Heat | | Semifinal | | Final | |
| Athlete | Event | Time | Rank | Time | Rank | Time | Rank |
|---|---|---|---|---|---|---|---|
| Donnie Defreitas | 50 m freestyle | 27.72 | 74 | did not advance | | | |
| Donnie Defreitas | 100 m backstroke | DNS | | did not advance | | | |

== See also ==
- Saint Vincent and the Grenadines at the 2002 Commonwealth Games
- Saint Vincent and the Grenadines at the 2003 Pan American Games
- Saint Vincent and the Grenadines at the 2006 Commonwealth Games
