= Saint Vincent and the Grenadines at the 2023 World Athletics Championships =

- Flag of Saint Vincent and the Grenadines
- WA code: VIN

in Budapest, Hungary 19 August 2023 – 27 August 2023
- Competitors: 1 (1 man and 0 women)
- Medals: Gold 0 Silver 0 Bronze 0 Total 0

World Athletics Championships appearances (overview)
- 1983; 1987; 1991; 1993; 1995; 1997; 1999; 2001; 2003; 2005; 2007; 2009; 2011; 2013; 2015; 2017; 2019; 2022; 2023; 2025

Saint Vincent and the Grenadines competed at the 2023 World Athletics Championships in Budapest, Hungary, which were held from 19 to 27 August 2023. The athlete delegation of the country was composed of one competitor, middle-distance runner Handal Roban who would compete in the men's 800 metres. He qualified for the Championships through his rank of 35th in the World Athletics Rankings. In the heats, Roban placed seventh out of the nine competitors that competed in his heat and did not advance to the semifinals of the event.

== Background ==
The 2023 World Athletics Championships in Budapest, Hungary, were held from 19 to 27 August 2023. The Championships were held at the National Athletics Centre. To qualify for the World Championships, athletes had to reach an entry standard (e.g. time or distance), place in a specific position at select competitions, be a wild card entry, or qualify through their World Athletics Ranking at the end of the qualification period.

Middle-distance runner Handal Roban would be the sole representative for the nation at the championships. He qualified after he ranked 35th in the World Athletics Rankings for the men's 800 metres. This was Roban's first World Athletics Championships appearance though he had previously competed for the nation at the 2021 World Athletics U20 Championships held in Nairobi, Kenya.

== Results ==
Key

- Q = Qualified for the next round
- q = Qualified for the next round as a fastest loser or, in field events, by position without achieving the qualifying target
- NR = National record
- PB = Personal best
- SB = Season best
- N/A = Round not applicable for the event

=== Men ===
Roban competed in the heats of the Men's 800 metres on 22 August against eight other competitors in his heat. He raced in the sixth heat and recorded a time of 1:46.86. There, he placed seventh and did not advance further to the semifinals.

Track and road events

Athlete	Event	Heat		Semifinal		Final	
Athlete	Event	Result	Rank	Result	Rank	Result	Rank
Handal Roban	800 metres	1:46.86	7	Did not advance			
