= Eddie Neufville =

Liberian sprinter

Personal information
- Nationality: Liberian
- Born: 16 November 1976 (age 49)

Sport
- Sport: Sprinting
- Event: 4 × 100 metres relay

Eddie Neufville (born 16 November 1976) is a Liberian sprinter. He competed in the men's 4 × 100 metres relay at the 1996 Summer Olympics.
