= André François (athlete) =

Personal information
- Born: 1 July 1964 (age 62)

Sport
- Country: Saint Vincent and the Grenadines
- Sport: Athletics

André François (born 1 July 1964) is a Vincentian sprinter. He competed in the men's 200 metres at the 1988 Summer Olympics.

== Career ==
François was part of the first Saint Vincent and the Grenadines team to compete at the Summer Olympics in 1988. He competed in the Men's 200 Metres. He ran his heat in 21.88 seconds and finished seventh out of eight runners. This was not quick enough for him to advance to the next round.
