= Saint Vincent and the Grenadines at the 2019 World Athletics Championships =

- WA code: VIN

in Doha, Qatar 27 September 2019 – 6 October 2019
- Competitors: 1 (1 man)
- Medals: Gold 0 Silver 0 Bronze 0 Total 0

World Athletics Championships appearances (overview)
- 1983; 1987; 1991; 1993; 1995; 1997; 1999; 2001; 2003; 2005; 2007; 2009; 2011; 2013; 2015; 2017; 2019; 2022; 2023

Saint Vincent and the Grenadines competed at the 2019 World Athletics Championships in Doha, Qatar, from 27 September–6 October 2019. Saint Vincent and the Grenadines had entered 1 athlete.

== Result ==
Key

- Note–Ranks given for track events are for the entire round
- Q = Qualified for the next round
- q = Qualified for the next round as a fastest loser or, in field events, by position without achieving the qualifying target
- NR = National record
- GR = Games record
- PB = Personal best
- SB = Season best
- DNF = Did not finish
- DNS = Did not start
- NM = No mark
- N/A = Round not applicable for the event
- Bye = Athlete not required to compete in round

=== Men ===
Track and road events

Athlete	Event	Heat		Semifinal		Final	
Athlete	Event	Result	Rank	Result	Rank	Result	Rank
Brandon Parris	400 m	47.39	34	Did not advance			
