= Pamenos Ballantyne =

Vincentian runner

Personal information
- Born: 9 December 1973 (age 52) New Sandy Bay Village, Saint Vincent and the Grenadines

Sport
- Sport: Track and field

Pamenos Avorsant Ballantyne (born 9 December 1973) is a long-distance runner from Saint Vincent and the Grenadines. He represented his country in the marathon at the 1996 and 2000 Summer Olympics.

His brother, Benedict Ballantyne, was also a long-distance runner.

== Competition record ==
Year	Competition	Venue	Position	Event	Notes
Representing Saint Vincent and the Grenadines
1994	Commonwealth Games	Victoria, Canada	9th (h)	5000 m	14:47.05
1994	Commonwealth Games	Victoria, Canada	15th	10,000 m	31:06.70
1995	World Championships	Gothenburg, Sweden	–	Marathon	DNF
1996	London Marathon	London	15th	Marathon	2:18:26
1996	Olympic Games	Atlanta, United States	95th	Marathon	2:34:16
1997	Central American and Caribbean Championships	San Juan, Puerto Rico	3rd	Half marathon	1:08:25
1998	Central American and Caribbean Games	Maracaibo, Venezuela	8th	5000 m	14:36.84
1998	Central American and Caribbean Games	Maracaibo, Venezuela	5th	10,000 m	30:29.91
1999	Central American and Caribbean Championships	Bridgetown, Barbados	2nd	10,000 m	31:12.57
2000	Olympic Games	Sydney, Australia	31st	Marathon	2:19:08
2001	Central American and Caribbean Championships	Guatemala City, Guatemala	7th	5000 m	14:57.58
2001	Central American and Caribbean Championships	Guatemala City, Guatemala	4th	10,000 m	31:20.86
2001	Central American and Caribbean Championships	Guatemala City, Guatemala	5th	Half marathon	1:07:06
2001	World Championships	Edmonton, Canada	25th	Marathon	2:24:36
2002	Commonwealth Games	Manchester, United Kingdom	11th	Marathon	2:19:36
2003	Central American and Caribbean Championships	St. George's, Grenada	1st	Half marathon	1:09:14
2003	Pan American Games	Santo Domingo, Dom. Rep.	7th	Marathon	2:29:37
2005	World Championships	Helsinki, Finland	42nd	Marathon	2:23:18
2006	Central American and Caribbean Games	Cartagena, Colombia	10th	Marathon	2:44:50
2010	Central American and Caribbean Games	Mayagüez, Puerto Rico	8th	Marathon	2:43:15
2010	Commonwealth Games	Delhi, India	16th	Marathon	2:30:29
2011	Central American and Caribbean Championships	Mayagüez, Puerto Rico	7th	Half marathon	1:17:08

== Personal bests ==
- 1500 metres – 4:01.8 (Castries 1993)
- 5000 metres – 14:31.5 (London 1998) NR
- 10,000 metres – 29:58.3 (Derby 1998) NR
- 10 kilometres – 29:49 (Bridgetown 1999) NR
- 15 kilometres – 53:18 (La Joya 2011)
- Half marathon – 1:05:43 (Toronto 2002) NR
- Marathon – 2:15:30 (Port-of-Spain 2003) NR OECS record

Olympic Games
Preceded by Eswort Coombs	Flagbearer for Saint Vincent and the Grenadines; Sydney 2000	Succeeded by Natasha Mayers
