= Thomas Dickson (sprinter) =

American sprinter

Personal information
- Born: 8 July 1974 (age 51)

Sport
- Sport: Track and field
- Club: Ohio State Buckeyes

Thomas Dickson (born 8 July 1974) is a retired sprinter from Saint Vincent and the Grenadines who specialized in the 400 metres.

At the 1996 Summer Olympics, he participated in the 4 x 400 metres relay. The relay team, consisting of Eswort Coombs, Dickson, Eversley Linley, and Erasto Sampson, set a national record there with 3:06.52 minutes. Dickson's personal best time in the 400 metres is 46.94 seconds, achieved in 1998.

Dickson was an All-American sprinter for the Ohio State Buckeyes track and field team, running 3rd leg on the 7th-place 4 × 400 m relay at the 2001 NCAA Division I Outdoor Track and Field Championships.
