= Clayton Latham =

Clayton Latham (born 18 April 1980 in Toronto, Ontario) is a long jumper from Saint Vincent and the Grenadines.

Latham was a two-time NJCAA Division I All-American and Champion in the Long Jump while at Barton County Community College (2001-2003). He is the current Vincentian National Record Holder, with a mark of 8.08m established in Hamburg, New York July 29, 2008. He competed at the 2009 World Athletics Championships in Berlin without reaching the final.
