= Erasto Sampson =

Erasto Kambon Sampson (born 23 June 1975) is a retired sprinter from Saint Vincent and the Grenadines who specialized in the 100 metres and 400 metres.

At the 1996 Summer Olympics he participated in the 100 metres, the 4 x 100 metres relay and the 4 x 400 metres relay.

His personal best times are 10.6 seconds in the 100 metres, achieved in 1997, and 46.96 seconds in the 400 metres, achieved in 1999. He holds the national record in the 4 x 400 metres relay with 3:06.52 minutes, achieved with teammates Eswort Coombs, Thomas Dickson and Eversley Linley during the heats at the 1996 Summer Olympics.
