= Jared Lewis =

Personal information
- Born: 9 March 1982 (age 44)

Sport
- Country: Saint Vincent and the Grenadines
- Sport: Athletics

Jared Lewis (born 9 March 1982) is a sprinter from Saint Vincent and the Grenadines who specializes in the 100 metres. He was born in Kingstown. His personal best time is 10.49 seconds, achieved in April 2005 in Vincennes.

He competed at the 2008 World Indoor Championships and the 2008 Olympic Games without progressing to the second round. In Beijing he placed 7th in his heat in a time of 11.00 seconds.
