= Team Athletics Saint Vincent & The Grenadines =

Governing body for athletics in Saint Vincent and the Grenadines

- Sport: Athletics
- Jurisdiction: Association
- Abbreviation: TASVG
- Founded: 1943
- Affiliation: IAAF
- Affiliation date: 1974
- Regional affiliation: NACAC
- Headquarters: Kingstown
- President: Keith Joseph
- Vice president: Michael Ollivierre
- Secretary: Alexandra Walrond
- Replaced: Saint Vincent and the Grenadines Amateur Athletics Association

Official website
- teamathleticssvg.com
- (Saint Vincent and the Grenadines)

Team Athletics Saint Vincent & The Grenadines (TASVG) is the governing body for the sport of athletics in Saint Vincent and the Grenadines.

== History ==
TASVG was founded in 1943 as Saint Vincent and the Grenadines Amateur Athletics Association (SVGAAA) and was affiliated to the IAAF in 1974. The name was changed to Team Athletics Saint Vincent & The Grenadines (TASVG), with its constitution dated December 12, 2004.

Current president is Keith Joseph. He was re-elected in December 2013.

== Affiliations ==
TASVG is the national member federation for Saint Vincent and the Grenadines in the following international organisations:

- World Athletics
- North American, Central American and Caribbean Athletic Association (NACAC)
- Association of Panamerican Athletics (APA)
- Central American and Caribbean Athletic Confederation (CACAC)

Moreover, it is part of the following national organisations:

- Saint Vincent and the Grenadines National Olympic Committee (SVGNOC)

== National records ==
TASVG maintains the Vincentian records in athletics.
