= Courtney Carl Williams =

Vincentian runner (born 1991)

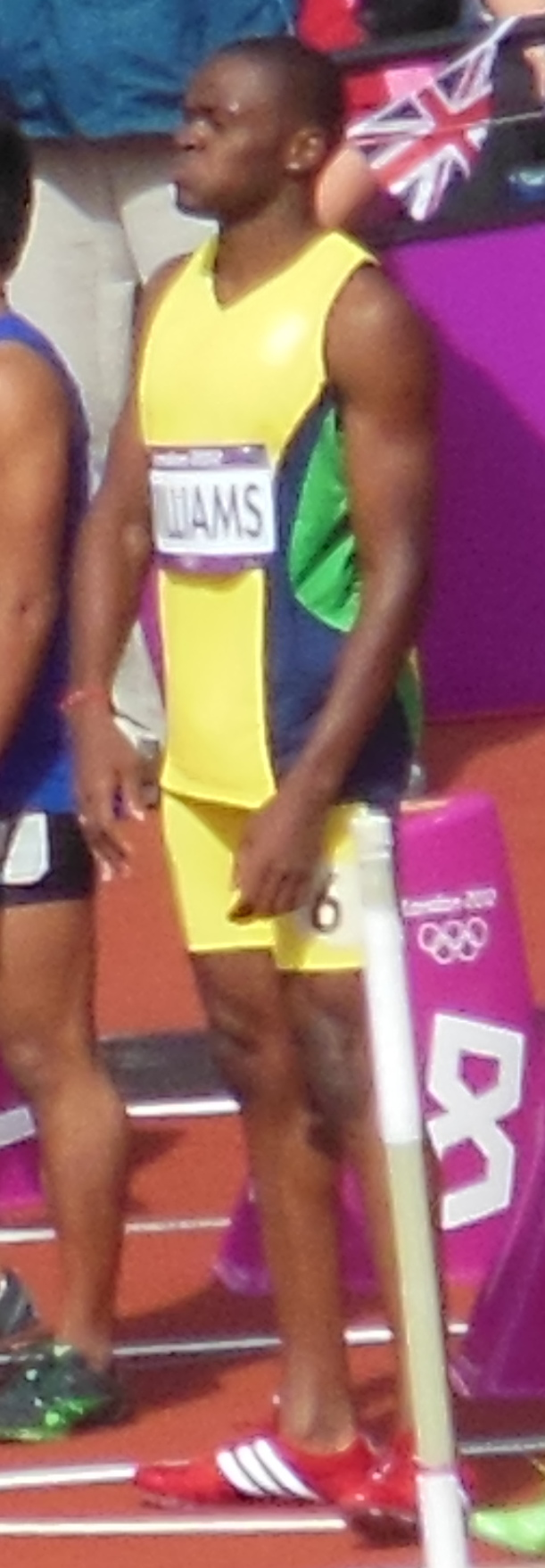
- Williams before the start of heat 4 of the 100 m at the 2012 Summer Olympics.

Personal information
- Born: 31 January 1991 (age 35) Kingstown, Saint Vincent and the Grenadines
- Height: 1.83 m (6 ft 0 in)
- Weight: 82 kg (181 lb)

Sport
- Country: Saint Vincent and the Grenadines
- Sport: Athletics
- Event: Sprinting
- Updated on 21 January 2015

Courtney Carl Williams (born 31 January 1991) is a Vincentian runner who competed at the 2012 Summer Olympics in the 100 m event. He was flagbearer at the closing ceremony.

== Personal bests ==
| Event | Result | Venue | Date |
|---|---|---|---|
| 100 m | 10.60 s A (wind: +1.4 m/s) | Morelia, Mexico | 5 July 2013 |
| 200 m | 21.16 s (wind: +2.0 m/s) | Basseterre, Saint Kitts and Nevis | 5 July 2014 |

== Competition record ==
| Year | Competition | Venue | Position | Event | Notes |
Representing Saint Vincent and the Grenadines
| 2006 | CARIFTA Games (U17) | Les Abymes, Guadeloupe | 5th (h) | 100m | 11.52 (+0.4 m/s) |
| 2006 | CARIFTA Games (U17) | Les Abymes, Guadeloupe | 6th (h) | 200m | 23.41 (+0.4 m/s) |
| 2006 | Central American and Caribbean; Junior Championships (U17) | Port of Spain, Trinidad and Tobago | 7th (h) | 100m | 11.28 (+1.9 m/s) |
| 2006 | Central American and Caribbean; Junior Championships (U17) | Port of Spain, Trinidad and Tobago | 6th (h) | 200m | 22.89 (-0.5 m/s) |
| 2007 | CARIFTA Games (U17) | Providenciales, Turks and Caicos Islands | 4th (h) | 100m | 11.35 (+0.2 m/s) |
| 2007 | CARIFTA Games (U17) | Providenciales, Turks and Caicos Islands | 3rd (h) | 200m | 22.47 w (+2.6 m/s) |
| 2007 | World Youth Championships | Ostrava, Czech Republic | 51st (h) | 100m | 11.16 (+1.8 m/s) |
| 2008 | CARIFTA Games (U20) | Basseterre, Saint Kitts and Nevis | 6th (sf) | 100m | 10.97 w (+4.7 m/s) |
| 2008 | CARIFTA Games (U20) | Basseterre, Saint Kitts and Nevis | 6th (h) | 200m | 23.46 (-1.8 m/s) |
| 2008 | World Junior Championships | Bydgoszcz, Poland | 56th (h) | 100m | 11.19 (-0.7 m/s) |
| 2009 | CARIFTA Games (U20) | Vieux Fort, Saint Lucia | 7th (h) | 100m | 10.93 w (+3.3 m/s) |
| 2009 | CARIFTA Games (U20) | Vieux Fort, Saint Lucia | 6th (sf) | 200m | 21.77 w (+2.3 m/s) |
| 2009 | Pan American Junior Championships | Port of Spain, Trinidad and Tobago | 8th (h) | 100m | 10.96 w (+2.2 m/s) |
| 2009 | Pan American Junior Championships | Port of Spain, Trinidad and Tobago | 6th (h) | 200m | 22.70 (-0.1 m/s) |
| 2010 | Central American and Caribbean Games | Mayagüez, Puerto Rico | 22nd (h) | 200m | 22.31 (-1.0 m/s) |
| 2011 | Central American and Caribbean Championships | Mayagüez, Puerto Rico | 27th (h) | 200m | 23.25 (+1.1 m/s) |
| 2011 | Central American and Caribbean Championships | Mayagüez, Puerto Rico | — | 4×100 m | DQ |
| 2011 | Pan American Games | Guadalajara, Mexico | 30th (h) | 100m | 11.15 (-2.0 m/s) |
| 2011 | Pan American Games | Guadalajara, Mexico | 29th (h) | 200m | 22.42 (+0.6 m/s) |
| 2012 | World Indoor Championships | Istanbul, Turkey | 43rd (h) | 60 m | 7.35 |
| 2012 | Olympic Games | London, United Kingdom | 11th (prelim) | 100 m | 10.80 (+0.5 m/s) |
| 2013 | Central American and Caribbean Championships | Morelia, Mexico | 26th (h) | 100m | 10.60 A (+1.4 m/s) |
| 2013 | Central American and Caribbean Championships | Morelia, Mexico | 22nd (h) | 200m | 21.81 A (-0.9 m/s) |
| 2013 | World Championships | Moscow, Russia | 49th (h) | 200m | 21.98 (-0.6 m/s) |
| 2014 | Commonwealth Games | Glasgow, United Kingdom | 54th (h) | 100m | 10.95 (+1.1 m/s) |
| 2014 | Commonwealth Games | Glasgow, United Kingdom | 56th (h) | 200m | 21.94 (-0.4 m/s) |
| 2014 | Commonwealth Games | Glasgow, United Kingdom | 11th (h) | 4×100 m | 40.47 |
| 2014 | Pan American Sports Festival | Mexico City, Mexico | 10th (h) | 100m | 10.69 A (-0.3 m/s) |
| 2014 | Pan American Sports Festival | Mexico City, Mexico | 12th (h) | 200m | 21.19 A (+0.2 m/s) |
| 2015 | Pan American Games | Toronto, Canada | 27th (h) | 200m | 21.35 (+1.6 m/s) |
