= Alex Joachim =

Vincentian swimmer (born 2003)

Personal information
- Born: April 14, 2003 (age 23)

Sport
- Sport: Swimming

Alex Joachim (born 14 April 2003) is a Vincentian swimmer. He competed in the men's 50 metre freestyle event at the 2024 Summer Olympics, where he set a national record but didn't advance from the heats.

Olympic Games
Preceded by Shafiqua Maloney	Flagbearer for Saint Vincent and the Grenadines; Paris 2024; With: Shafiqua Maloney	Incumbent
