= Mya de Freitas =

Vincentian swimmer (born 2005)

Personal information
- Nationality: Saint Vincent and the Grenadines
- Born: 16 September 2005 (age 20) Kingstown

Sport
- Sport: Swimming

Mya de Freitas (born 16 September 2005) is a Vincentian swimmer. She competed in the 2020 Summer Olympics. She holds various Vincentian national swimming records for different lengths.

== Career ==
De Freitas swims for the Black Sands swimming club. Whilst only 15, de Freitas represented Saint Vincent and the Grenadines at the 2019 FINA World Championships in Gwangju, South Korea and broke the Vincentian swimming record. She also competed in the 50 metre freestyle and 100 metre freestyle at the 2019 Pan American Games. She went on to hold the Vincentian records for five distances. As a result, she was given a universality place by the International Olympic Committee at the 2020 Summer Olympics in Tokyo, Japan at the women's 50 metre freestyle on the grounds of her performances.

Her training before the Olympics was disrupted as a result of the 2021 eruption of La Soufrière and due to her having to travel to Barbados in order to get a visa for Japan which led to her losing a month of training time in the pool. At the Olympics, delayed by a year due to the COVID-19 pandemic in Japan, de Freitas was placed in Heat 4 but failed to progress after finishing fourth in her race.

After the Olympics, de Freitas represented Saint Vincent and the Grenadines at the 2023 Carifta Swimming Championships. She finished seventh in the 200 metres freestyle, with the low result being attributed due to her suffering from an illness. In 2025, she won seven medals at the Rodney Heights Swimming Championships in Saint Lucia.
