= Joel Mascoll =

Personal information
- Born: 26 October 1974 (age 51)

Sport
- Sport: Track and field

Joel Mascoll (born 26 October 1974) is a former Vincentian sprinter who competed in the men's 100m competition at the 1996 Summer Olympics. He recorded a 10.64, not enough to qualify for the next round past the heats.

Mascoll competed for the Norfolk State Spartans track and field team in the NCAA.

His personal best is 10.33, set in 1997. He was also on the Vincentian 4 × 100 m relay team, which placed 6th in its heat with a 40.54.
