= Eversley Linley =

Athletics competitor

Personal information
- Born: 1 November 1969 (age 56)

Sport
- Sport: Track and field
Medal record
Representing Saint Vincent and the Grenadines
CARIFTA Games Junior (U20)
| Bronze medal – third place | 1987 Port of Spain | 800m |
| Bronze medal – third place | 1988 Kingston | 800m |

Eversley Augustus Linley (born 1 November 1969) is a retired sprinter from Saint Vincent and the Grenadines who specialized in the 400 metres and 800 metres events.

Linley competed for the Idaho Vandals track and field team in the NCAA. He later became an attorney in Boston, Massachusetts focusing on international law.

He participated in the 800 metre event at the 1988 and 1992 Olympics, and in the 4 x 400 metres relay, at the 1992 and 1996 Olympics.

His personal best records are 46.55 seconds in the 400 metres, achieved in 1992, and 1:48.58 minutes in the 800 metres, achieved in 1992 (indoor). He holds the national record in 4 x 400 metres relay with 3:06.52 minutes, achieved with teammates Eswort Coombs, Thomas Dickson, and Erasto Sampson during the heats at the 1996 Summer Olympics.
