= Shafiqua Maloney =

St Vincent & Grenadines athlete born 1999

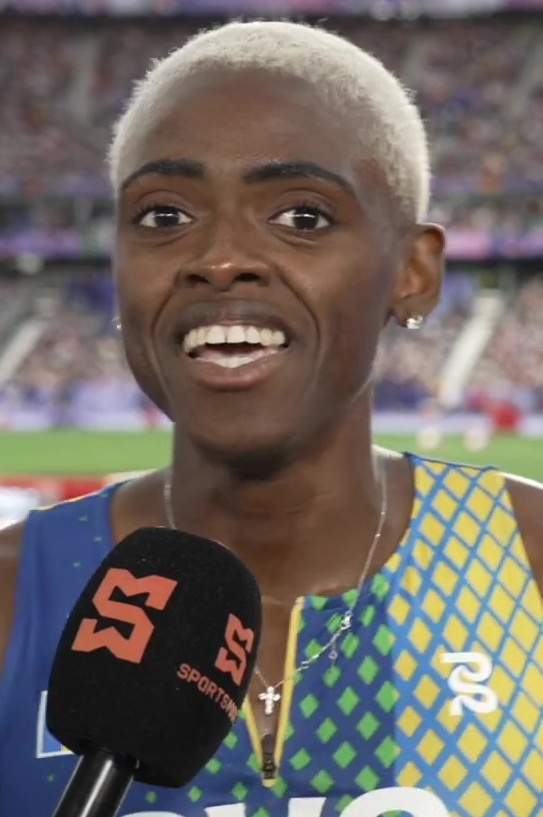
- Shafiqua Maloney at the 2024 Summer Olympics

Personal information
- Born: February 27, 1999 (age 27) Richland Park, Saint Vincent and the Grenadines
Medal record
Athletics
Representing Saint Vincent and the Grenadines
NACAC Championships
Silver medal – second place	2025 Freeport	800 m
NCAA Indoor Championships
Gold medal – first place	2022 Birmingham	4x400 m
NACAC U-23 Championships
Gold medal – first place	2021 San Jose	800 meters
Silver medal – second place	2021 San Jose	400 meters

Shafiqua Maloney (born 27 February 1999) is a Vincentian middle-distance runner. She holds the 800 m national record both indoors and outdoors.

== NCAA career ==
Maloney studied for two years at Southern Illinois University starting in 2016 and moved to the University of Arkansas in 2018. She has competed at 200m, 400m, 800m and in 300m hurdles events. She won the 800m gold and the 400m silver medal in the 2021 NACAC U23 Championships.

In the 2022 NCAA Division I Indoor Track and Field Championships Maloney placed 6th in the 800m and won gold with her team in the 4x400m relay.

== Professional career ==
She competed in the women's 800m event at the 2020 Summer Olympics, and was the sole flag-bearer for her country in the Parade of Nations during the opening ceremony.

Maloney also competed at the 2024 Olympics in Paris, France, finishing 4th in the women's 800m final.

== Statistics ==
Grand Slam Track results
Slam	Race group	Event	Pl.	Time	Prize money
2025 Miami Slam	Short distance	1500 m	7th	4:16.35	US$12,500
2025 Miami Slam	Short distance	800 m	6th	2:00.96	US$12,500

Olympic Games
Preceded by Kineke Alexander	Flag bearer for Saint Vincent and the Grenadines; Tokyo 2020; Paris 2024 with Alex Joachim	Succeeded by Incumbent
