= Kineke Alexander =

Vincentian sprinter

Personal information
- Full name: Kineke Alicia Alexander
- Born: 21 February 1986 (age 40) Kingstown, Saint Vincent and the Grenadines
- Height: 1.78 m (5 ft 10 in)
- Weight: 65 kg (143 lb)

Sport
- Country: Saint Vincent and the Grenadines
- Sport: Track
- Event: 400m
- College team: Iowa
Medal record
Women's athletics
Representing Saint Vincent and the Grenadines
Pan American Games
| Bronze medal – third place | 2015 Toronto | 400 m |
CAC Championships
| Gold medal – first place | 2013 Morelia | 200 m |
| Bronze medal – third place | 2013 Morelia | 400 m |

Kineke Alicia Alexander (born 21 February 1986) is a Vincentian sprinter who competed in the 400m event at the 2008 Summer Olympics and the 2012 Summer Olympics. She was the flag bearer for Saint Vincent and the Grenadines at the 2008 opening ceremony and the 2012 opening ceremony. She was also the Saint Vincent and the Grenadines flagbearer at the 2014 Commonwealth Games.

At the 2008 Summer Olympics, she finished in 4th place in her 400 m heat and therefore did not progress further. At the London 2012 Olympics, Kineke competed in the first Round of the Women's 400m but she didn't finish. Alexander qualified for the 2016 Summer Olympics and was again the flag bearer for the Saint Vincent and the Grenadines. At the 2016 Summer Olympics, she finished 7th in her heat and did not qualify for the semifinals.

== Personal bests ==
| Event | Result | Venue | Date |
Outdoor
| 100 m | 11.69 s (wind: -1.3 m/s) | Houston, United States | 23 March 2013 |
| 200 m | 23.00 s A (wind: -0.6 m/s) | Morelia, Mexico | 7 July 2013 |
| 400 m | 51.23 s | San Marcos, United States | 26 April 2014 |
Indoor
| 60 m | 7.34 s | Houston, United States | 17 January 2014 |
| 200 m | 23.24 s | Fayetteville, United States | 14 February 2015 |
| 400 m | 51.48 s | Fayetteville, United States | 10 March 2007 |

== Achievements ==
| Year | Competition | Venue | Position | Event | Notes |
Representing Saint Vincent and the Grenadines
| 2001 | CARIFTA Games (U17) | Bridgetown, Barbados | 7th | 200m | 25.38 (-4.0 m/s) |
| 2001 | CARIFTA Games (U17) | Bridgetown, Barbados | 8th | 400m | 59.66 |
| 2001 | World Youth Championships | Debrecen, Hungary | 13th (h)^{1} | 200m | 25.00 (+0.1 m/s) |
| 2001 | World Youth Championships | Debrecen, Hungary | 24th (h) | 400m | 57.54 |
| 2002 | CARIFTA Games (U17) | Nassau, Bahamas | 5th | 200m | 24.97 (-1.3 m/s) |
| 2002 | CARIFTA Games (U17) | Nassau, Bahamas | 3rd | 400m | 56.23 |
| 2002 | CARIFTA Games (U17) | Nassau, Bahamas | — | Long jump | NM |
| 2002 | Central American and Caribbean; Junior Championships (U17) | Bridgetown, Barbados | 5th | 200m | 25.30 (-1.0 m/s) |
| 2002 | Central American and Caribbean; Junior Championships (U17) | Bridgetown, Barbados | 2nd | 400m | 55.42 |
| 2002 | Central American and Caribbean; Junior Championships (U20) | Bridgetown, Barbados | 7th | 4 × 100 m relay | 49.11 |
| 2002 | Central American and Caribbean; Junior Championships (U20) | Bridgetown, Barbados | 5th | 4 × 400 m relay | 4:02.33 |
| 2003 | CARIFTA Games (U20) | Port of Spain, Trinidad and Tobago | 6th | 400m | 54.34 |
| 2003 | CARIFTA Games (U20) | Port of Spain, Trinidad and Tobago | 7th | 800m | 2:22.80 |
| 2003 | World Youth Championships | Sherbrooke, Canada | 36th (h) | 200m | 25.10 (+1.0 m/s) |
| 2003 | World Youth Championships | Sherbrooke, Canada | 14th (sf) | 400m | 57.49 |
| 2003 | Pan American Junior Championships | Bridgetown, Barbados | 5th (h) | 200m | 24.70 (+0.4 m/s) |
| 2003 | Pan American Junior Championships | Bridgetown, Barbados | 4th (h) | 400m | 56.00 |
| 2004 | CARIFTA Games (U20) | Port of Spain, Trinidad and Tobago | 5th (h) | 200m | 24.49 w (+2.3 m/s) |
| 2004 | CARIFTA Games (U20) | Port of Spain, Trinidad and Tobago | 2nd | 400m | 53.83 |
| 2004 | Central American and Caribbean; Junior Championships (U20) | Coatzacoalcos, Mexico | 8th | 200m | 24.91 w (+2.7 m/s) |
| 2004 | Central American and Caribbean; Junior Championships (U20) | Coatzacoalcos, Mexico | 1st | 400m | 53.93 |
| 2004 | World Junior Championships | Grosseto, Italy | 15th (sf) | 400m | 56.42 |
| 2005 | Central American and Caribbean Championships | Nassau, Bahamas | 9th (h) | 400 m | 53.43 |
| 2005 | Pan American Junior Championships | Windsor, Canada | 4th | 400m | 53.28 |
| 2005 | World Championships | Helsinki, Finland | 6th (h) | 400 m | 54.45 |
| 2006 | Commonwealth Games | Melbourne, Australia | 17th (sf) | 400m | 53.19 |
| 2006 | NACAC Under-23 Championships | Santo Domingo, Dominican Republic | 4th | 400m | 52.95 |
| 2006 | Central American and Caribbean Games | Cartagena, Colombia | 3rd | 400m | 52.04 |
| 2007 | NACAC Championships | San Salvador, El Salvador | 3rd | 400m | 53.52 |
| 2007 | Pan American Games | Rio de Janeiro, Brazil | 10th (h) | 400m | 52.37 |
| 2007 | World Championships | Osaka, Japan | 28th (h) | 400 m | 52.51 |
| 2008 | Central American and Caribbean Championships | Cali, Colombia | 11th (h) | 400m | 52.68 A |
| 2008 | NACAC U-23 Championships | Toluca, Mexico | 6th | 400m | 53.22 A |
| 2008 | Olympic Games | Beijing, China | 32nd (h) | 400 m | 52.87 |
| 2009 | World Championships | Berlin, Germany | 22nd (sf) | 400 m | 53.43 |
| 2011 | Central American and Caribbean Championships | Mayagüez, Puerto Rico | 16th (h) | 400m | 55.41 |
| 2011 | Pan American Games | Guadalajara, Mexico | 12th (h) | 400m | 53.42 A |
| 2012 | World Indoor Championships | Istanbul, Turkey | 20th (h) | 400 m | 55.88 |
| 2012 | Olympic Games | London, United Kingdom | — | 400 m | DNF |
| 2013 | BVI Twilight Invitational | Road Town, British Virgin Islands | 3rd place, bronze medalist(s) | 200m | 23.40 (-0.8 m/s) |
| 2013 | BVI Twilight Invitational | Road Town, British Virgin Islands | 3rd place, bronze medalist(s) | 400m | 51.67 |
| 2013 | Central American and Caribbean Championships | Morelia, Mexico | 1st | 200m | 23.00 A (-0.6 m/s) |
| 2013 | Central American and Caribbean Championships | Morelia, Mexico | 3rd | 400m | 52.81 A |
| 2013 | World Championships | Moscow, Russia | 33rd (h) | 200 m | 23.42 (+0.1 m/s) |
| 2013 | World Championships | Moscow, Russia | 15th (sf) | 400 m | 51.64 |
| 2014 | World Indoor Championships | Sopot, Poland | 13th (h) | 400 m | 52.80 |
| 2014 | Commonwealth Games | Glasgow, United Kingdom | 5th (sf) | 200m | 23.58 (-0.2 m/s) |
| 2014 | Commonwealth Games | Glasgow, United Kingdom | 5th | 400m | 52.78 |
| 2014 | Pan American Sports Festival | Mexico City, Mexico | 4th | 400m | 51.94 A |
| 2014 | Central American and Caribbean Games | Xalapa, Mexico | 6th | 400m | 54.21 A |
| 2015 | NACAC Championships | San José, Costa Rica | 4th | 400m | 52.51 |
| 2015 | World Championships | Beijing, China | 34th (h) | 200 m | 23.30 |
| 2015 | World Championships | Beijing, China | 31st (h) | 400 m | 52.24 |
| 2016 | Olympic Games | Rio de Janeiro, Brazil | 34th (h) | 400 m | 52.45 |
| 2018 | World Indoor Championships | Birmingham, United Kingdom | 30th (h) | 400 m | 55.46 |
| 2018 | Commonwealth Games | Gold Coast, Australia | 19th (sf) | 400 m | 54.35 |
| 2018 | Central American and Caribbean Games | Barranquilla, Colombia | 10th (h) | 400 m | 54.78 |
| 2018 | NACAC Championships | Toronto, Canada | 7th | 400 m | 55.36 |

^{1}: Did not show in the semifinal.

Olympic Games
| Preceded by Natasha Mayers | Flagbearer for Saint Vincent and the Grenadines; Beijing 2008; London 2012; Rio de Janeiro 2016 | Succeeded by Shafiqua Maloney |
