= Saint Vincent and the Grenadines at the 2011 World Aquatics Championships =

Sporting event delegation

Flag of Saint Vincent and the Grenadines

Saint Vincent and the Grenadines competed at the 2011 World Aquatics Championships in Shanghai, China between July 16 and 31, 2011.

== Swimming ==
Saint Vincent and the Grenadines qualified 1 swimmer.

Men

| Athlete | Event | Heats | | Semifinals | | Final | |
| Athlete | Event | Time | Rank | Time | Rank | Time | Rank |
|---|---|---|---|---|---|---|---|
| Tolga Akcayli | Men's 50m Freestyle | 25.96 | 73 | did not advance | | | |
| Tolga Akcayli | Men's 50m Butterfly | 30.05 | 50 | did not advance | | | |
