= Eswort Coombs =

Track and field sprinter from Saint Vincent and the Grenadines

Personal information
- Born: 28 November 1972 (age 53) Kingstown, Saint George

Sport
- Sport: Track and field
- Club: Ohio State Buckeyes
Medal record
Representing Saint Vincent and the Grenadines
Summer Universiade
Gold medal – first place	1995 Fukuoka	400m
Pan American Games
Bronze medal – third place	1995 Mar del Plata	400m

Eswort Lorenzo Brian Coombs (born 28 November 1972) is a retired track and field sprinter from Saint Vincent and the Grenadines who specialized in the 400 metres.

In addition to 400 m he holds the national record in 4 x 400 metres relay with 3:06.52 minutes, achieved with teammates Thomas Dickson, Eversley Linley, Erasto Sampson during the heats at the 1996 Summer Olympics.

Coombs was an All-American for the Ohio State Buckeyes track and field team, anchoring their 4 × 400 m relay to a 7th-place finish at the 1997 NCAA Division I Indoor Track and Field Championships.

== Achievements ==
Year	Competition	Venue	Position	Notes
Representing Saint Vincent and the Grenadines
1994	Commonwealth Games	Victoria, Canada	6th	400 m
1995	Pan American Games	Mar del Plata, Argentina	3rd	400 m
1995	Universiade	Fukuoka, Japan	1st	400 m
1995	Central American and Caribbean Championships	Guatemala City, Guatemala	1st	400 m
