= Saint Vincent and the Grenadines Olympic Committee =

National Olympic Committee

Saint Vincent and The Grenadines Olympic Committee
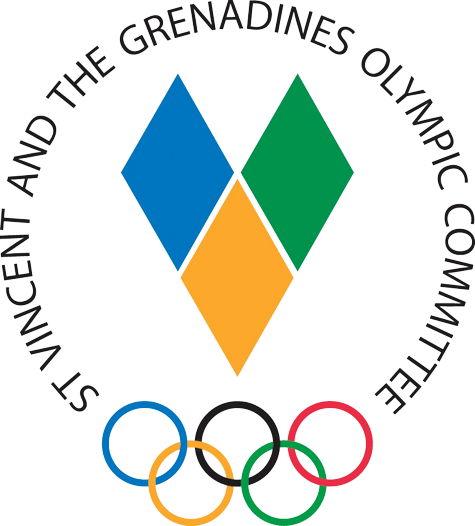
- Country/Region: Saint Vincent and the Grenadines
- Code: VIN
- Created: 1982
- Recognized: 1987
- Continental Association: PASO
- Headquarters: Kingstown, Saint Vincent and the Grenadines
- President: Stephen Joachim
- Secretary General: Keith Joseph
- Website: svgnoc.org

The Saint Vincent and the Grenadines Olympic Committee (IOC code: VIN) is the National Olympic Committee (NOC) representing Saint Vincent and the Grenadines. It is also the body responsible for Saint Vincent and the Grenadines' representation at the Commonwealth Games.

== History ==
Saint Vincent and The Grenadines Olympic Committee was founded in 1982 and recognised by the International Olympic Committee in 1987.

== See also ==
- Saint Vincent and the Grenadines at the Olympics
- Saint Vincent and the Grenadines at the Commonwealth Games
