= List of participating nations at the Commonwealth Games =

Commonwealth Games participants

This is a list of nations that have participated in the Commonwealth Games between 1930 and 2022. Participation in the Games is limited to member states of the Commonwealth of Nations and their territories.Although there are 56 members of the Commonwealth of Nations, 74 teams currently participate in the Commonwealth Games as a number of dependent territories compete under their own flags.The four Home Nations of the United Kingdom (England, Scotland, Wales and Northern Ireland) also send separate teams.

Only six teams have attended every Commonwealth Games: Australia, Canada, England, New Zealand, Scotland and Wales. Several territories of Commonwealth nations (such as the Pitcairn Islands, and Tokelau) have never sent teams. Gabon and Togo, both of which joined the organisation in June 2022, made their debuts in 2026.

== List of nations ==
This list includes all 74 current CGAs as well as a number of obsolete CGAs, arranged alphabetically. The three-letter country code is also listed for each CGA. Several nations have changed during the Games' history; name changes are explained by footnotes after the nation's name, and other notes are explained by footnotes linked within the table.

=== Table legend ===
30	In the table headings, indicates the Games year
•	Participated in the specified Games
H	Host nation for the specified Games
^{[a]}	Additional explanatory comments at the linked footnote
	Nation not a member, or territory of a member, of the Commonwealth of Nations during these years
	CGA superseded or preceded by other CGA(s) during these years
-	Nation did not participate due to suspension from the Commonwealth of Nations

=== Alphabetical list ===
A	Code	30	34	38	50	54	58	62	66	70	74	78	82	86	90	94	98	02	06	10	14	18	22	26	Total
Anguilla	ANG	Saint Christopher-Nevis-Anguilla															•	•	•	•	•	•	•	•	8
Antigua and Barbuda	ANT								•	•		•				•	•	•	•	•	•	•	•	•	12
Australia	AUS	•	•	H	•	•	•	H	•	•	•	•	H	•	•	•	•	•	H	•	•	H	•	•	23
B	Code	30	34	38	50	54	58	62	66	70	74	78	82	86	90	94	98	02	06	10	14	18	22	26	Total
Bahamas	BAH					•	•	•	•	•		•	•		•	•	•	•	•	•	•	•	•	•	17
Bangladesh	BAN	India			Pakistan							•			•	•	•	•	•	•	•	•	•	•	11
Barbados	BAR					•	•	•	•	•	•	•	•		•	•	•	•	•	•	•	•	•	•	18
Belize	BIZ							•	•			•				•	•	•	•	•	•	•	•	•	12
Bermuda	BER	•	•	•		•			•	•	•	•	•	•^{[b]}	•	•	•	•	•	•	•	•	•	•	20
Botswana	BOT										•		•	•	•	•	•	•	•	•	•	•	•	•	13
British Virgin Islands	IVB														•	•	•	•	•	•	•	•	•	•	10
Brunei	BRU														•	•	•	•	•	•	•	•	•	•	10
C	Code	30	34	38	50	54	58	62	66	70	74	78	82	86	90	94	98	02	06	10	14	18	22	26	Total
Cameroon	CMR																•	•	•	•	•	•	•	•	8
Canada	CAN	H	•	•	•	H	•	•	•	•	•	H	•	•	•	H	•	•	•	•	•	•	•	•	23
Newfoundland	NEW	•	•																						2
Cayman Islands	CAY	Jamaica										•	•	•	•	•	•	•	•	•	•	•	•	•	13
Cook Islands	COK										•	•		•	•	•	•	•	•	•	•	•	•	•	13
Cyprus	CYP											•	•		•	•	•	•	•	•	•	•	•	•	12
D	Code	30	34	38	50	54	58	62	66	70	74	78	82	86	90	94	98	02	06	10	14	18	22	26	Total
Dominica	DMA						•	•		•						•	•	•	•	•	•	•	•	•	12
E	Code	30	34	38	50	54	58	62	66	70	74	78	82	86	90	94	98	02	06	10	14	18	22	26	Total
England	ENG	•	H	•	•	•	•	•	•	•	•	•	•	•	•	•	•	H	•	•	•	•	H	•	23
Eswatini	SWZ									•	•	•	•	•	•	•	•	•	•	•	•	•	•	•	15
F	Code	30	34	38	50	54	58	62	66	70	74	78	82	86	90	94	98	02	06	10	14	18	22	26	Total
Falkland Islands	FLK												•	•	•	•	•	•	•	•	•	•	•	•	12
Fiji	FIJ			•	•	•	•	•	•	•	•	•	•	•			•	•	•	-	•	•	•	•	18
G	Code	30	34	38	50	54	58	62	66	70	74	78	82	86	90	94	98	02	06	10	14	18	22	26	Total
Gabon	GAB																							•	1
The Gambia	GAM									•	•	•	•		•	•	•	•	•	•		•	•	•	13
Ghana	GHA					•	•	•	•	•	•	•	•		•	•	•	•	•	•	•	•	•	•	18
Gibraltar	GIB						•	•	•	•	•	•	•	•	•	•	•	•	•	•	•	•	•	•	18
Grenada	GRN									•	•	•	•				•	•	•	•	•	•	•	•	12
Guernsey	GGY									•	•	•	•	•	•	•	•	•	•	•	•	•	•	•	15
Guyana	GUY	•	•	•		•	•	•	•	•		•	•		•	•	•	•	•	•	•	•	•	•	20
H	Code	30	34	38	50	54	58	62	66	70	74	78	82	86	90	94	98	02	06	10	14	18	22	26	Total
Hong Kong	HKG		•			•	•	•		•	•	•	•	•	•	•									11
I	Code	30	34	38	50	54	58	62	66	70	74	78	82	86	90	94	98	02	06	10	14	18	22	26	Total
India	IND		•	•		•	•		•	•	•	•	•		•	•	•	•	•	H	•	•	•	•	19
Irish Free State	IFS	^{IRE}	•^{[a]}																						1
Isle of Man	IOM						•	•	•	•	•	•	•	•	•	•	•	•	•	•	•	•	•	•	18
J	Code	30	34	38	50	54	58	62	66	70	74	78	82	86	90	94	98	02	06	10	14	18	22	26	Total
Jamaica	JAM		•			•	•	•	H	•	•	•	•		•	•	•	•	•	•	•	•	•	•	19
Jersey	JEY						•	•	•	•	•	•	•	•	•	•	•	•	•	•	•	•	•	•	18
K	Code	30	34	38	50	54	58	62	66	70	74	78	82	86	90	94	98	02	06	10	14	18	22	26	Total
Kenya	KEN					•	•	•	•	•	•	•	•		•	•	•	•	•	•	•	•	•	•	18
Kiribati	KIR																•	•	•	•	•	•	•	•	8
L	Code	30	34	38	50	54	58	62	66	70	74	78	82	86	90	94	98	02	06	10	14	18	22	26	Total
Lesotho	LES										•	•		•	•	•	•	•	•	•	•	•	•	•	13
M	Code	30	34	38	50	54	58	62	66	70	74	78	82	86	90	94	98	02	06	10	14	18	22	26	Total
Malawi	MAW							^{FRN}		•	•	•	•	•	•	•	•	•	•	•	•	•	•	•	15
Malaysia	MAS	BNB, MAL, SAR							•	•	•	•	•		•	•	H	•	•	•	•	•	•	•	15
British North Borneo	BNB						•	•																	2
Malaya	MAL				•		•	•																	3
Sarawak	SAR						•	•																	2
Maldives	MDV													•	•	•	•	•	•	•	•		•	•	10
Malta	MLT						•	•		•			•	•	•	•	•	•	•	•	•	•	•	•	15
Mauritius	MRI						•	•	•	•	•	•	•		•	•	•	•	•	•	•	•	•	•	17
Montserrat	MSR															•	•	•	•	•	•	•	•	•	9
Mozambique	MOZ																•	•	•	•	•	•	•	•	8
N	Code	30	34	38	50	54	58	62	66	70	74	78	82	86	90	94	98	02	06	10	14	18	22	26	Total
Namibia	NAM															•	•	•	•	•	•	•	•	•	9
Nauru	NRU														•	•	•	•	•	•	•	•	•	•	10
New Zealand	NZL	•	•	•	H	•	•	•	•	•	H	•	•	•	H	•	•	•	•	•	•	•	•	•	23
Nigeria	NGR				•	•	•		•	•	•		•		•	•	-	•	•	•	•	•	•	•	16
Niue	NIU																	•	•	•	•	•	•	•	7
Norfolk Island	NFK													•	•	•	•	•	•	•	•	•	•	•	11
Northern Ireland	NIR	^{IRE}	•^{[a]}	•		•	•	•	•	•	•	•	•	•	•	•	•	•	•	•	•	•	•	•	21
Ireland	IRE	•	^{[a]}																						1
P	Code	30	34	38	50	54	58	62	66	70	74	78	82	86	90	94	98	02	06	10	14	18	22	26	Total
Pakistan	PAK	India				•	•	•	•	•					•	•	•	•	•	•	•	•	•	•	15
Papua New Guinea	PNG							•	•	•	•	•	•		•	•	•	•	•	•	•	•	•	•	16
R	Code	30	34	38	50	54	58	62	66	70	74	78	82	86	90	94	98	02	06	10	14	18	22	26	Total
Rwanda	RWA																			•	•	•	•	•	5
S	Code	30	34	38	50	54	58	62	66	70	74	78	82	86	90	94	98	02	06	10	14	18	22	26	Total
Saint Helena	SHN												•				•	•	•	•	•	•	•	•	9
Saint Kitts and Nevis	SKN	Saint Christopher-Nevis-Anguilla													•	•	•	•	•	•	•	•	•	•	10
Saint Christopher-Nevis-Anguilla	SCN											•													1
Saint Lucia	LCA							•		•		•				•	•	•	•	•	•	•	•	•	12
Saint Vincent and the Grenadines	SVG						•		•	•	•	•				•	•	•	•	•	•	•	•	•	14
Samoa	SAM										•	•	•	•	•	•	•	•	•	•	•	•	•	•	14
Scotland	SCO	•	•	•	•	•	•	•	•	H	•	•	•	H	•	•	•	•	•	•	H	•	•	H	23
Seychelles	SEY														•	•	•	•	•	•	•	•	•	•	10
Sierra Leone	SLE						•		•	•		•			•	•	•	•	•	•	•	•	•	•	14
Singapore	SGP						•	•	•	•	•	•	•	•	•	•	•	•	•	•	•	•	•	•	18
Solomon Islands	SOL												•		•	•	•	•	•	•	•	•	•	•	11
South Africa	RSA	•	•	•	•	•	•									•	•	•	•	•	•	•	•	•	15
Federation of South Arabia	FSA	Aden							•																1
Aden	ADN							•																	1
Sri Lanka	SRI			•	•		•	•	•	•		•	•		•	•	•	•	•	•	•	•	•	•	18
T	Code	30	34	38	50	54	58	62	66	70	74	78	82	86	90	94	98	02	06	10	14	18	22	26	Total
Tanzania	TAN	Tanganyika							•	•	•	•	•		•	•	•	•	•	•	•	•	•	•	15
Tanganyika	TAG							•																	1
Togo	TOG																							•	1
Tonga	TGA										•		•		•	•	•	•	•	•	•	•	•	•	12
Trinidad and Tobago	TTO		•	•		•	•	•	•	•	•	•	•		•	•	•	•	•	•	•	•	•	•	20
Turks and Caicos Islands	TCA	Jamaica										•					•	•	•	•	•	•	•	•	9
Tuvalu	TUV																•	•	•	•	•	•	•	•	8
U	Code	30	34	38	50	54	58	62	66	70	74	78	82	86	90	94	98	02	06	10	14	18	22	26	Total
Uganda	UGA					•	•	•	•	•	•		•		•	•	•	•	•	•	•	•	•	•	17
V	Code	30	34	38	50	54	58	62	66	70	74	78	82	86	90	94	98	02	06	10	14	18	22	26	Total
Vanuatu	VAN												•	•	•	•	•	•	•	•	•	•	•	•	12
W	Code	30	34	38	50	54	58	62	66	70	74	78	82	86	90	94	98	02	06	10	14	18	22	26	Total
Wales	WAL	•	•	•	•	•	H	•	•	•	•	•	•	•	•	•	•	•	•	•	•	•	•	•	23
Z	Code	30	34	38	50	54	58	62	66	70	74	78	82	86	90	94	98	02	06	10	14	18	22	26	Total
Zambia	ZAM					•	•	^{FRN}		•	•	•	•		•	•	•	•	•	•	•	•	•	•	16
Zimbabwe	ZIM		•	•	•	•	•	^{FRN}					•		•	•	•	•							10
Rhodesia and Nyasaland	FRN							•																	1
Total		11	17	15	12	24	35	35	34	42	38	46	46	27	55	63	70	72	71	71	71	71	72	74	

== See also ==
- Member states of the Commonwealth of Nations
- List of CGF country codes
- List of participating nations at the Summer Olympic Games
- List of participating nations at the Winter Olympic Games

== Notes ==
=== Name change notes ===
BIZ: Belize participated under its former name of British Honduras (HBR) in 1962 and 1966.
GHA: Ghana participated under its former name of Gold Coast (GCO) in 1954.
GUY: Guyana participated under its former name of British Guiana (BGU) between 1930 and 1962.
PNG: Papua New Guinea participated under its former name of Papua and New Guinea (PNG) between 1962 and 1970.
SAM: Samoa participated under its former name of Western Samoa (SAM) between 1974 and 1994.
SRI: Sri Lanka participated under its former name of Ceylon (CEY) between 1938 and 1970.
SWZ: Eswatini participated under its former name of Swaziland (SWZ) between 1970 and 2018.
ZAM: Zambia participated under its former name of Northern Rhodesia (NRH) in 1954 and 1958.
ZIM: Zimbabwe participated under its former name of Southern Rhodesia (SRH) between 1934 and 1958.

=== Participation notes ===
1. The affiliation of Irish athletes at the 1934 Games is disputed and contemporary sources on the matter are contradictory, see Ireland at the British Empire Games.
2. Bermuda took part in the 1986 Games' opening ceremony and in the opening day of competition before the Bermuda Olympic Association decided to formally withdraw, joining wider boycotts.
