= Boxing at the Commonwealth Games =

Boxing competitions

Boxing is one of the sports at the quadrennial Commonwealth Games competition. It has been a Commonwealth Games sport since the inaugural edition of the event's precursor, the 1930 British Empire Games. It is a core sport and must be included in the sporting programme of each edition of the Games.

== Editions ==
Games	Year	Host city	Host country	Best nation
I	1930	Hamilton, Ontario	Canada	England
II	1934	London	England	England
III	1938	Sydney	Australia	South Africa
IV	1950	Auckland	New Zealand	England
V	1954	Vancouver	Canada	South Africa
VI	1958	Cardiff	Wales	South Africa
VII	1962	Perth	Australia	Ghana
VIII	1966	Kingston	Jamaica	Ghana
IX	1970	Edinburgh	Scotland	Uganda
X	1974	Christchurch	New Zealand	England
XI	1978	Edmonton	Canada	Kenya
XII	1982	Brisbane	Australia	Kenya
XIII	1986	Edinburgh	Scotland	Canada
XIV	1990	Auckland	New Zealand	Kenya
XV	1994	Victoria	Canada	Canada
XVI	1998	Kuala Lumpur	Malaysia	England
XVII	2002	Manchester	England	Australia
XVIII	2006	Melbourne	Australia	England
XIX	2010	Delhi	India	Northern Ireland
XX	2014	Glasgow	Scotland	England
XXI	2018	Gold Coast	Australia	England
XXII	2022	Birmingham	England	Northern Ireland
XXIII	2026	Glasgow	Scotland	India
XXIII	2030	Ahmedabad	India	

== All-time medal table ==
Updated after the 2026 Commonwealth Games

Rank	Nation	Gold	Silver	Bronze	Total
1	England	66	34	46	146
2	Canada	26	25	45	96
3	Australia	20	20	41	81
4	Scotland	20	16	37	73
5	Northern Ireland	19	22	33	74
6	India	18	16	20	54
7	South Africa	15	8	13	36
8	Nigeria	13	7	22	42
9	Kenya	12	13	23	48
10	Ghana	9	12	15	36
11	Wales	8	17	26	51
12	Uganda	8	10	17	35
13	New Zealand	7	6	25	38
14	Zambia	2	8	20	30
15	Namibia	2	3	4	9
16	Jamaica	2	3	2	7
17	Zimbabwe	1	8	5	14
18	Mauritius	1	6	7	14
19	Pakistan	1	3	5	9
20	Sri Lanka	1	2	3	6
21	Fiji	1	0	4	5
22	Guyana	1	0	3	4
23	Malaysia	1	0	2	3
24	Saint Vincent and the Grenadines	1	0	0	1
25	Samoa	0	3	7	10
26	Botswana	0	2	5	7
27	Mozambique	0	2	2	4
27	Seychelles	0	2	2	4
27	Trinidad and Tobago	0	2	2	4
30	Cameroon	0	2	1	3
31	Lesotho	0	1	3	4
32	Papua New Guinea	0	1	2	3
32	Swaziland	0	1	2	3
34	Bahamas	0	0	3	3
34	Malawi	0	0	3	3
36	Barbados	0	0	2	2
36	Jersey	0	0	2	2
36	Tanzania	0	0	2	2
39	Cyprus	0	0	1	1
39	Niue	0	0	1	1
39	Singapore	0	0	1	1
39	Trinidad and Tobago	0	0	1	1
39	Tuvalu	0	0	1	1
Totals (43 entries)		255	255	461	971
