= Swimming at the 2026 Commonwealth Games – Women's 50 metre backstroke =

Women's 50 metre backstroke at the 2026 Commonwealth Games
- Venue: Tollcross International Swimming Centre
- Dates: 27 July (heats, semifinals); 28 July (final)
- Winning time: 27.32

Medalists
gold medal	Kylie Masse	Canada
silver medal	Iona Anderson	Australia
bronze medal	Lauren Cox	England

The women's 50 metre backstroke event at the 2026 Commonwealth Games was held on 27 and 28 July at the Tollcross International Swimming Centre.

== Schedule ==
The schedule is as follows:

All times are British Summer Time (UTC+1)

Date	Time	Round
Monday 27 July 2026	10:30	Heats
Monday 27 July 2026	19:00	Semifinals
Tuesday 28 July 2026	19:00	Final

== Results ==
=== Heats ===
The heats was held on the morning of 27 July 2026.

Heat results
Rank	Heat	Lane	Swimmer	Nation	Time	Notes
1	6	5	Kylie Masse	Canada	27.79	Q
2	5	5	Danielle Hill	Northern Ireland	28.04	Q
3	6	4	Lauren Cox	England	28.14	Q
4	4	4	Iona Anderson	Australia	28.17	Q
5	6	6	Savannah-Eve Martin	New Zealand	28.19	Q
6	6	3	Olivia Nel	South Africa	28.22	Q
7	4	5	Jessica Thompson	South Africa	28.56	Q
8	4	3	Hannah Fredericks	Australia	28.61	Q
9	5	6	Madison Kryger	Canada	28.77	Q
10	5	3	Amber George	New Zealand	28.78	Q
11	5	7	Bex Sutton	Wales	28.79	Q
12	4	7	Halle Harris	Sierra Leone	29.07	Q
13	5	1	J.O.T. Humphrey	Namibia	29.08	Q
14	4	2	Emma Harvey	Bermuda	29.20	Q
15	6	7	Ella Justice	Isle of Man	29.30	Q
16	6	2	Medi Harris	Wales	29.33	Q
17	5	2	Lottie Cullen	Northern Ireland	29.44	R
18	6	1	Tatiana Tostevin	Guernsey	29.59	R
19	3	5	Mia Phiri	Zambia	29.83	
20	4	1	Sierrah Broadbelt	Cayman Islands	30.00	
21	1	4	Hannah Pearse	South Africa	30.12	
22	4	8	Nafanua Hamilton	Samoa	30.41	
23	3	6	Sharmeen Mohammad Mharvin	Brunei	30.63	
24	3	4	Nubia Adjei	Ghana	30.91	
25	3	3	Anishta Teeluck	Mauritius	30.92	
26	5	8	Elizabeth Curphey	Isle of Man	31.06	
27	3	2	Megan Hansford	Jersey	31.20	
28	3	7	Tallulah-Mae Rautenbach	Guernsey	31.41	
29	2	4	Aaliyah Palestrini	Seychelles	31.49	
30	2	5	Amna Thazkiyah Mirsaad	Maldives	31.55	NR
30	3	1	Angelina Smythe	Seychelles	31.55	
32	6	8	Jhnayali Tokome-Garap	Papua New Guinea	31.65	
33	2	3	Molly Staples	Guernsey	31.92	
34	3	8	Riley Watson	Cayman Islands	32.21	
35	2	6	Tara Naluwoza	Uganda	32.66	
36	2	2	Joanna Chen	Papua New Guinea	33.78	
37	2	1	Katie Maddocks	Gibraltar	34.13	
38	1	3	Katie Green	Gibraltar	34.74	
39	1	5	Arleigha Hall	Turks and Caicos Islands	34.81	
40	2	7	Kayleigh Vanterpool	Anguilla	45.72	
	4	6	Delia Lloyd	Canada	DNS	
	5	4	Mollie O'Callaghan	Australia	DNS	

=== Semifinals ===
The semifinals took place during of the evening of 27 July 2026.

Semifinal results
Rank	Heat	Lane	Swimmer	Nation	Time	Notes
1	2	4	Kylie Masse	Canada	27.57	Q
2	1	5	Iona Anderson	Australia	27.69	Q
3	2	5	Lauren Cox	England	27.85	Q
4	1	3	Olivia Nel	South Africa	28.12	Q
5	1	4	Danielle Hill	Northern Ireland	28.17	Q
6	2	3	Savannah-Eve Martin	New Zealand	28.28	Q
7	1	2	Amber George	New Zealand	28.37	Q
8	1	6	Hannah Fredericks	Australia	28.50	Q
9	2	6	Jessica Thompson	South Africa	28.54	R
10	2	7	Bex Sutton	Wales	28.67	R
11	2	1	J.O.T. Humphrey	Namibia	28.88	
12	2	2	Madison Kryger	Canada	28.93	
13	1	7	Halle Harris	Sierra Leone	29.01	
14	1	1	Emma Harvey	Bermuda	29.13	
15	1	8	Medi Harris	Wales	29.25	
16	2	8	Ella Justice	Isle of Man	29.37	

=== Final ===
The final took place during of the evening of 28 July 2026.

Final results
Rank	Lane	Swimmer	Nation	Time	Notes
1st place, gold medalist(s)	4	Kylie Masse	Canada	27.32	
2nd place, silver medalist(s)	5	Iona Anderson	Australia	27.45	
3rd place, bronze medalist(s)	3	Lauren Cox	England	27.56	
4	2	Danielle Hill	Northern Ireland	27.87	
5	6	Olivia Nel	South Africa	27.95	
6	1	Amber George	New Zealand	28.33	
7	7	Savannah-Eve Martin	New Zealand	28.43	
8	8	Hannah Fredericks	Australia	28.49	
