= Judo at the Commonwealth Games =

Judo competition

Judo is one of the sports at the quadrennial Commonwealth Games competition. It was first competed as a demonstration sport at the 1986 Games before being included in the main program for the first time in 1990.

Judo was an optional sport at the Commonwealth Games since it appeared in the 1990, 2002 and 2014 editions and from 2022, it is currently a core sport. Judo will be one of the 10 sports at the program during the 2026 Commonwealth Games.

== Editions ==
Games	Year	Host country	Host city
XIII	1986 (Note: demonstration sport)	Scotland	Edinburgh
XIV	1990	New Zealand	Auckland
XVII	2002	England	Manchester
XX	2014	Scotland	Glasgow
XXII	2022	England	Birmingham
XXIII	2026	Scotland	Glasgow

== All-time medal table ==
Updated after the 2026 Commonwealth Games.

Rank	Nation	Gold	Silver	Bronze	Total
1	England	37	13	17	67
2	Canada	10	13	13	36
3	Scotland	9	9	19	37
4	Australia	4	8	23	35
5	India	2	6	7	15
6	New Zealand	2	5	9	16
7	Cyprus	2	4	4	10
8	South Africa	2	2	4	8
9	Wales	1	4	10	15
10	Mauritius	1	1	4	6
11	Fiji	1	0	1	2
11	Malaysia	1	0	1	2
13	Cameroon	0	2	5	7
14	Northern Ireland	0	1	8	9
15	Nigeria	0	1	5	6
16	Pakistan	0	1	1	2
16	The Gambia	0	1	1	2
18	Jamaica	0	1	0	1
19	Malta	0	0	3	3
20	Bahamas	0	0	1	1
20	Gabon	0	0	1	1
20	Ghana	0	0	1	1
20	Tonga	0	0	1	1
20	Zambia	0	0	1	1
Totals (24 entries)		72	72	140	284
