= Swimming at the 2026 Commonwealth Games – Women's 50 metre breaststroke =

Women's 50 metre breaststroke at the 2026 Commonwealth Games
- Venue: Tollcross International Swimming Centre
- Dates: 27 July (heats, semifinals); 28 July (final)
- Winning time: 30.43

Medalists
| gold medal | Lara van Niekerk | South Africa |
| silver medal | Sienna Toohey | Australia |
| bronze medal | Imogen Clark | England |
| bronze medal | Sophie Angus | Canada |

The women's 50 metre breaststroke event at the 2026 Commonwealth Games will be held on 27 and 28 July at the Tollcross International Swimming Centre.

== Schedule ==
The schedule is as follows:

All times are British Summer Time (UTC+1)

| Date | Time | Round |
|---|---|---|
| Monday 27 July 2026 | 10:30 | Heats |
| Monday 27 July 2026 | 19:00 | Semifinals |
| Tuesday 28 July 2026 | 19:00 | Final |

== Results ==
=== Heats ===
The heats will be held on the morning of 27 July 2026.

Heat results
| Rank | Heat | Lane | Swimmer | Nation | Time | Notes |
|---|---|---|---|---|---|---|
| 1 | 4 | 4 | Lara van Niekerk | South Africa | 30.23 | Q |
| 2 | 3 | 4 | Sienna Toohey | Australia | 30.72 | Q |
| 3 | 2 | 5 | Sophie Angus | Canada | 30.79 | Q |
| 4 | 4 | 5 | Anna Morgan | Scotland | 30.96 | Q |
| 5 | 4 | 6 | Sabrina Lyn | Jamaica | 31.19 | Q |
| 6 | 2 | 4 | Imogen Clark | England | 31.25 | Q |
| 7 | 3 | 5 | Gabrielle Idle-Beavers | England | 31.32 | Q |
| 8 | 3 | 3 | Kaylene Corbett | South Africa | 31.54 | Q |
| 9 | 2 | 3 | Rebecca Meder | South Africa | 31.67 | Q |
| 10 | 4 | 3 | Lanihei Connolly | Cook Islands | 31.81 | Q |
| 11 | 1 | 7 | Tara Kinder | Australia | 31.88 | Q |
| 12 | 2 | 6 | Maria Erokhina | Cyprus | 31.98 | Q |
| 13 | 3 | 6 | Amy Crowley | Wales | 32.31 | Q |
| 14 | 4 | 7 | Alicia Kok Shun | Mauritius | 32.50 | Q |
| 15 | 2 | 2 | Laura Kinley | Isle of Man | 32.90 | Q |
| 16 | 3 | 2 | Asia Kent | Gibraltar | 33.11 | Q |
| 17 | 1 | 3 | Namutebi Kirabo | Uganda | 33.18 | R |
| 18 | 4 | 2 | Zaylie Elizabeth Thompson | Bahamas | 33.60 | R |
| 19 | 3 | 7 | Kelera Mudunasoko | Fiji | 33.63 | |
| 20 | 2 | 8 | Adara Stoddard | Barbados | 34.35 | |
| 21 | 4 | 1 | Dorcas Oka | Nigeria | 34.72 | |
| 22 | 3 | 1 | Emma Bourgaize | Guernsey | 35.06 | |
| 23 | 2 | 7 | Vaoahi Afu | Tonga | 35.86 | |
| 24 | 1 | 6 | Hareem Malik | Pakistan | 36.52 | |
| 25 | 1 | 5 | Roxanne Kirarock | Papua New Guinea | 36.98 | |
| 26 | 3 | 8 | Katie Green | Gibraltar | 37.71 | |
| 27 | 2 | 1 | Skyla Connor | Saint Kitts and Nevis | 39.29 | |
| 28 | 1 | 2 | Axela Marita Echessah | Rwanda | 41.38 | |
| 29 | 4 | 8 | Zoe Rebello | Malawi | 42.40 | |
| 30 | 1 | 4 | Loise Bently | Solomon Islands | 50.85 | |

=== Semifinals ===
The semifinals will take place during of the evening of 27 July 2026.

Semifinal results
| Rank | Heat | Lane | Swimmer | Nation | Time | Notes |
|---|---|---|---|---|---|---|
| 1 | 1 | 4 | Sienna Toohey | Australia | 30.58 | Q |
| 2 | 2 | 4 | Lara van Niekerk | South Africa | 30.63 | Q |
| 3 | 1 | 3 | Imogen Clark | England | 30.94 | Q |
| 4 | 2 | 5 | Sophie Angus | Canada | 30.99 | Q |
| 5 | 2 | 3 | Sabrina Lyn | Jamaica | 31.13 | Q |
| 6 | 2 | 6 | Gabrielle Idle-Beavers | England | 31.19 | Q |
| 7 | 1 | 5 | Anna Morgan | Scotland | 31.22 | Q |
| 8 | 2 | 2 | Rebecca Meder | South Africa | 31.53 | Q |
| 9 | 1 | 6 | Kaylene Corbett | South Africa | 31.6 | R |
| 10 | 1 | 2 | Lanihei Connolly | Cook Islands | 31.73 | R |
| 11 | 1 | 7 | Maria Erokhina | Cyprus | 31.91 | |
| 12 | 2 | 7 | Tara Kinder | Australia | 32.05 | |
| 13 | 2 | 1 | Amy Crowley | Wales | 32.56 | |
| 14 | 1 | 1 | Alicia Kok Shun | Mauritius | 33.13 | |
| 15 | 2 | 8 | Laura Kinley | Isle of Man | 33.24 | |
| 16 | 1 | 8 | Asia Kent | Gibraltar | 33.36 | |

=== Final ===
The final will take place during of the evening of 28 July 2026.

Final results
| Rank | Lane | Swimmer | Nation | Time | Notes |
|---|---|---|---|---|---|
| 1st place, gold medalist(s) | 5 | Lara van Niekerk | South Africa | 30.43 | |
| 2nd place, silver medalist(s) | 4 | Sienna Toohey | Australia | 30.54 | |
| 3rd place, bronze medalist(s) | 3 | Imogen Clark | England | 30.86 | |
| 3rd place, bronze medalist(s) | 6 | Sophie Angus | Canada | 30.86 | |
| 5 | 2 | Sabrina Lyn | Jamaica | 30.95 | |
| 6 | 1 | Anna Morgan | Scotland | 31.32 | |
| 7 | 7 | Gabrielle Idle-Beavers | England | 31.36 | |
| 8 | 8 | Rebecca Meder | South Africa | 31.81 | |
