= Commonwealth Games Association =

Organization that prepares national teams for the Commonwealth Games

A Commonwealth Games Association (CGA) is a national sports council of the Commonwealth Sports movement. Each association is responsible for organising, supporting and overseeing their national team for both the Commonwealth Games and the Commonwealth Youth Games. The associations are subject to the rules of, and report to, Commonwealth Sport. As well as promoting sports nationally, an association can also place a bid for the Commonwealth Games for a potential host city. While some nations have a stand-alone association dealing exclusively with the Commonwealth Games (particularly the Home Nations, the Crown Dependencies and most of the British Overseas Territories, all of whom compete at the Olympics as one Great Britain team but compete as separate teams at the Commonwealth Games), in many of the Commonwealth nations, the local National Olympic Committee performs the function of Commonwealth Games Association for that nation. In a few nations, such as Eswatini and Malawi, the local organisation carries both names in its normal title.

== Current member associations ==
As stated in the Commonwealth Sport Constitution, the current 74 member associations are grouped into the following regions: Gabon and Togo are expected to make their debuts at the 2026 Commonwealth Games bringing the member associations to 74.

Of the 74 member associations:

- 55 represent sovereign states;
- 9 represent British Overseas Territories;
- 4 represent 'home nations' within the United Kingdom;
- 3 represent Crown Dependencies;
- 2 represent associated states of the Realm of New Zealand;
- 1 represents an external territory of Australia.

=== Africa ===
21 member associations, all sovereign states.

- Botswana
- Cameroon
- Eswatini
- Gabon
- The Gambia
- Ghana
- Kenya
- Lesotho
- Malawi
- Mauritius
- Mozambique
- Namibia
- Nigeria
- Rwanda
- Seychelles
- Sierra Leone
- South Africa
- Tanzania
- Togo
- Uganda
- Zambia

=== Americas ===
Seven member associations - three self-governing British Overseas Territories, and four sovereign states.

- (The Bahamas) Bahamas
- Belize
- Bermuda
- Canada
- Falkland Islands
- Guyana
- Saint Helena

=== Asia ===
Eight member associations, all sovereign states.

- Bangladesh
- Brunei
- India
- Malaysia
- Maldives
- Pakistan
- Singapore
- Sri Lanka

=== Caribbean ===
14 member associations - five self-governing British Overseas Territories, and nine sovereign states.

- Anguilla
- Antigua and Barbuda
- Barbados
- British Virgin Islands
- Cayman Islands
- Dominica
- Grenada
- Jamaica
- Montserrat
- Saint Kitts and Nevis
- Saint Lucia
- Saint Vincent and the Grenadines
- Trinidad and Tobago
- Turks and Caicos Islands

=== Europe ===
Ten member associations - Four home nations within the sovereign state of the United Kingdom, one self-governing British Overseas Territory, three self-governing Crown Dependencies and two further sovereign states.

- Cyprus
- England
- Gibraltar
- Guernsey
- Isle of Man
- Jersey
- Malta
- Northern Ireland
- Scotland
- Wales

=== Oceania ===
14 member associations - two self governing associated states of the Realm of New Zealand, one external territory of Australia and eleven sovereign states.

- Australia
- Cook Islands
- Fiji
- Kiribati
- Nauru
- New Zealand
- Niue
- Norfolk Island
- Papua New Guinea
- Samoa
- Solomon Islands
- Tonga
- Tuvalu
- Vanuatu

== Former member associations ==
The following 9 have been members of the CGA in the past, before their nations withdrew from the Commonwealth or merged with other members.

- Aden
- Hong Kong
- Ireland
- Irish Free State
- Newfoundland
- North Borneo
- Sarawak
- South Arabia
- Zimbabwe

== See also ==
- Commonwealth Games Federation
- Commonwealth Games
- Commonwealth Youth Games
- National Olympic Committee
