= Saint Kitts and Nevis at the 2014 Commonwealth Games =

- CG code: SKN
- CGA: St. Kitts and Nevis Olympic Committee
- Website: sknoc.org

in Glasgow, Scotland
- Competitors: 12 in 2 sports
- Flag bearer: Antoine Adams
- Medals: Gold 0 Silver 0 Bronze 0 Total 0

Commonwealth Games appearances (overview)
- 1990; 1994; 1998; 2002; 2006; 2010; 2014; 2018; 2022; 2026; 2030

Other related appearances
- Saint Christopher-Nevis-Anguilla (1978)

Saint Kitts and Nevis competed in the 2014 Commonwealth Games in Glasgow, Scotland from 23 July to 3 August 2014. The team consisted of 12 athletes in two sports.

== Athletics ==
The team consisted of 9 athletes.

Men

Athlete	Event	Round 1		Semifinal		Final	
Athlete	Event	Result	Rank	Result	Rank	Result	Rank
Antoine Adams	100 m	10.31	8 Q	10.18	7 Q	10.16	4
Antoine Adams	200 m	20.88	18 Q	20.76	16	did not advance	
Jason Rogers	100 m	10.43	19 Q	10.30	=18	did not advance	
Brijesh Lawrence	100 m	10.43	23 q	10.49	24	did not advance	
Brijesh Lawrence	200 m	21.21	37	did not advance			
Lestrod Roland	200 m	21.42	42	did not advance			
Lestrod Roland	400 m	47.17	27	did not advance			
Antoine Adams; Allistar Clarke; Delwayne Delaney; Brijesh Lawrence; Jason Rogers; Lestrod Roland	4 x 100 m relay	DNF		—N/a		did not advance	

Women

Athlete	Event	Round 1		Semifinal		Final	
Athlete	Event	Result	Rank	Result	Rank	Result	Rank
Marecia Pemberton	100 m	11.77	22 q	11.72	21	did not advance	
Meritzer Williams	100 m	11.75	21 q	11.79	23	did not advance	

Key

- Note–Ranks given for track events are within the athlete's heat only
- Q = Qualified for the next round
- q = Qualified for the next round as a fastest loser or, in field events, by position without achieving the qualifying target
- NR = National record
- N/A = Round not applicable for the event
- Bye = Athlete not required to compete in round

== Table tennis ==
The team consisted of 3 athletes.

Singles

Athlete	Event	Group Stage			Round of 64	Round of 32	Round of 16	Quarterfinals	Semifinals	Final	Rank
Athlete	Event	Opposition Result	Opposition Result	Rank	Opposition Result	Opposition Result	Opposition Result	Opposition Result	Opposition Result	Opposition Result	Rank
Andre Freeman	Men's Singles	Dorovolomo (SOL); L 1 - 4	Howieson (SCO); L 0 - 4	3	did not advance						
Calvin Lake	Men's Singles	Sirisena (SRI); L 0 - 4	Dyer (DMA); L 0 - 4	3	did not advance						
Angellisa Freeman	Women's Singles	Flaws (SCO); L 0 - 4	Foster (JAM); L 0 - 4	3	did not advance						

Doubles

Athlete	Event	Round of 128	Round of 64	Round of 32	Round of 16	Quarterfinals	Semifinals	Final	Rank
Athlete	Event	Opposition Result	Opposition Result	Opposition Result	Opposition Result	Opposition Result	Opposition Result	Opposition Result	Rank
Andre Freeman; Calvin Lake	Men's Doubles	—N/a	Ghana; L 0 - 3	did not advance					
Angellisa Freeman; Andre Freeman	Mixed Doubles	Mauritius; L 0 - 3	did not advance						

== See also ==
- Saint Kitts and Nevis at the 2014 Summer Youth Olympics
