= Saint Kitts and Nevis at the 2026 Commonwealth Games =

- Flag of Saint Kitts and Nevis
- CG code: SKN
- CGA: Saint Kitts and Nevis Olympic Committee
- Website: sknoc.org

in Glasgow, Scotland 23 July 2026 – 2 August 2026
- Competitors: 4 in 2 sports
- Flag bearer: Skyla Connor
- Baton bearer: Jonathan Essien
- Medals: Gold 0 Silver 0 Bronze 0 Total 0

Commonwealth Games appearances (overview)
- 1990; 1994; 1998; 2002; 2006; 2010; 2014; 2018; 2022; 2026; 2030

Other related appearances
- Saint Christopher-Nevis-Anguilla (1978)

The Saint Kitts and Nevis competed at the 2026 Commonwealth Games in Glasgow, Scotland. This marked The Saint Kitts and Nevis' 10th participation at the games, after making its debut at the 1990 Commonwealth Games.

The King's Baton relay stopped in Saint Kitts and Nevis in March 2025.

The Saint Kitts and Nevis team consisted of four athletes (three men and one woman) commpeting in two sports: athletics and swimming.

Swimmer Skyla Connor was the country's flagbearer during the opening ceremony. Meanwhile, fellow swimmer Jonathan Essien was the baton bearer during the opening ceremony.

== Competitors ==
The following is the list of number of competitors participating at the Games per sport/discipline.

Sport	Men	Women	Total
Athletics	2	0	2
Swimming	1	1	2
Total	3	1	4

== Athletics ==
Saint Kitts and Nevis entered two male track athletes.

Key

- Q = Qualified for the next round
- q = Qualified for the next round as a fastest loser or, in field events, by position without achieving the qualifying target

Men
Track events

Athlete	Event	First Round		Semifinal		Final	
Athlete	Event	Time	Rank	Time	Rank	Time	Rank
Shamarie Roberts	100 m	10.63	4	Did not advance			
Alexander Caines	800 m	1:54.22	7	Did not advance			

== Swimming ==
The Saint Kitts and Nevis entered two swimmers (one man and one woman). This marked the country's debut in the sport at the Commonwealth Games.

Athlete	Event	Heat		Semifinal		Final	
Athlete	Event	Time	Rank	Time	Rank	Time	Rank
Jonathan Essien	Men's 50 m butterfly	26.59	51	Did not advance			
Jonathan Essien	Men's 100 m butterfly	1:00.04	33	Did not advance			
Skyla Connor	Women's 50 m freestyle	29.68	59	Did not advance			
Skyla Connor	Women's 50 m breaststroke	39.29	27	Did not advance			
