= All-time Commonwealth Games medal table =

Ranking of participants by medal total from all past competitions

This page shows the all-time medal table for the Commonwealth Games since the first British Empire Games in 1930 but excluding the Inter-Empire Championships in 1911, seen as a pre-cursor to the Games. The table is updated as of 2nd August 2026, after the 2026 Commonwealth Games in Glasgow ended. These rankings sort by the number of gold medals earned by a country. The number of silvers is taken into consideration next and then the number of bronze. If, after the above, countries are still tied, equal ranking is given and they are listed alphabetically. This follows the system used by the IOC, IAAF and BBC.

== Medal table ==
*Note : Nations in italics no longer participate at the Commonwealth Games.

Updated after 2026 Commonwealth Games,

Rank	CGA	Gold	Silver	Bronze	Total
1	Australia	1,071	878	822	2,771
2	England	805	826	801	2,432
3	Canada	532	569	609	1,710
4	India	215	207	180	602
5	New Zealand	189	246	306	741
6	Scotland	145	152	246	543
7	South Africa	144	144	157	445
8	Kenya	94	84	89	267
9	Nigeria	92	90	112	294
10	Wales	84	114	167	365
11	Malaysia	76	81	96	253
12	Jamaica	75	58	62	195
13	Singapore	41	33	37	111
14	Northern Ireland	40	50	69	159
15	Pakistan	27	27	28	82
16	Cyprus	26	21	29	76
17	Uganda	19	18	26	63
18	Ghana^{[a]}	15	21	28	64
19	Trinidad and Tobago	13	26	30	69
20	Bahamas	12	16	14	42
21	Cameroon	12	13	20	45
22	Nauru	10	11	12	33
23	Samoa	7	13	11	31
24	Zimbabwe^{[b]}	6	9	14	29
25	Tanzania	6	7	11	24
26	Zambia^{[c]}	5	13	26	44
27	Sri Lanka^{[d]}	5	10	11	26
28	Papua New Guinea	5	8	3	16
29	Fiji	5	7	13	25
30	Botswana	5	6	8	19
31	Namibia	5	5	17	27
32	Hong Kong	5	2	9	16
33	Guyana^{[e]}	4	6	6	16
34	Isle of Man	4	3	7	14
35	Grenada	4	2	2	8
36	Barbados	3	5	8	16
37	Bermuda	3	2	4	9
38	British Virgin Islands	3	0	0	3
39	Mauritius	2	11	9	22
40	Mozambique	2	4	3	9
41	Bangladesh	2	4	2	8
42	Jersey	2	1	3	6
43	Saint Vincent and the Grenadines	2	0	1	3
44	Guernsey	1	5	3	9
45	Dominica	1	2	1	4
46	Lesotho	1	1	3	5
46	Saint Lucia	1	1	3	5
48	Cayman Islands	1	0	1	2
49	Kiribati	1	0	0	1
49	Saint Kitts and Nevis	1	0	0	1
51	Seychelles	0	3	4	7
52	Rhodesia and Nyasaland	0	2	5	7
53	Malta	0	1	7	8
54	Swaziland^{[f]}	0	1	3	4
55	The Gambia	0	1	2	3
56	Ireland	0	1	0	1
57	Tonga	0	0	4	4
58	Malawi	0	0	3	3
58	Norfolk Island	0	0	3	3
58	Vanuatu	0	0	3	3
61	Cook Islands	0	0	1	1
61	Gabon	0	0	1	1
61	Niue	0	0	1	1
61	Rwanda	0	0	1	1
61	Solomon Islands	0	0	1	1
61	Tuvalu	0	0	1	1
Totals (66 entries)		3,829	3,821	4,159	11,809

- ^[a] Totals for Ghana include all medals won as Gold Coast
- ^[b] Totals for Zimbabwe include all medals won as Southern Rhodesia
- ^[c] Totals for Zambia include all medals won as Northern Rhodesia
- ^[d] Totals for Sri Lanka include all medals won as Ceylon
- ^[e] Totals for Guyana include all medals won as British Guiana
- ^[f] Swaziland has changed its name to Eswatini

== Nations and territories without medals ==
=== Current Commonwealth members ===
As of the end of the 2026 Commonwealth Games.

Nations and territories	No. Games
Anguilla^{[aa]}	8
Antigua and Barbuda^{[aa]}	12
Belize^{[ab]}	12
Brunei	11
Falkland Islands	12
Gibraltar	18
Maldives	10
Montserrat	9
Saint Helena	9
Sierra Leone	14
Togo	1
Turks and Caicos Islands^{[aa]}	9

- ^[aa] Won at least one medal at a Commonwealth Youth Games
- ^[ab] Total for Belize includes appearances as British Honduras

Former Commonwealth members

Nations and territories	No. Games
Federation of South Arabia^{[ac]}	2
Newfoundland^{[ad]}	2
British North Borneo^{[ad]}	2
Sarawak^{[ad]}	2
Irish Free State^{[ae]}	1
Tanganyika^{[ad]}	1

- ^[ac] Total for the Federation of South Arabia includes appearance as Aden
- ^[ad] Athletes from these territories subsequently won medals as part of Malaysia (British North Borneo and Sarawak), Tanzania (Tanganyika) or Canada (Newfoundland)
- ^[ae] An athlete from this territory had previously won a medal as part of Ireland

== See also ==
- All-time Olympic Games medal table
