= British Honduras at the 1962 British Empire and Commonwealth Games =

- CGF code: HBR
- CGA: British Honduras Olympic and Commonwealth Games Association
- Website: belizeolympicteam.com

in Perth, Western Australia
- Competitors: 2 athletes (2 men) in 1 sport
- Flag bearers: Opening: Closing:
- Medals: Gold 0 Silver 0 Bronze 0 Total 0

British Empire and Commonwealth Games appearances (overview)
- 1962; 1966; 1970–1974; 1978; 1982–1990; 1994; 1998; 2002; 2006; 2010; 2014; 2018; 2022; 2026; 2030

British Honduras competed at the 1962 British Empire and Commonwealth Games in Perth, Western Australia, from 22 November to 1 December 1962. This was the first time that the nation competed at the games. The British Honduras Olympic and Commonwealth Games Association sent two athletes, both of whom competed in athletics.

== Athletics ==
Men
Track events

| Athlete | Event | Round 1 | | Round 2 | | Semifinal | | Final | |
| Athlete | Event | Result | Rank | Result | Rank | Result | Rank | Result | Rank |
|---|---|---|---|---|---|---|---|---|---|
| Eustace Gill | 100 yards | 10.2 | 5 | Did not advance | | | | | |
| Eustace Gill | 220 yards | DNS | | Did not advance | | | | | |
| Eustace Gill | 440 yards | 50.5 | 4 | —N/a | | Did not advance | | | |
| Eustace Gill | 880 yards | 2:08.0 | 5 | —N/a | | Did not advance | | | |

Field events

| Athlete | Event | Final | |
| Athlete | Event | Distance | Rank |
|---|---|---|---|
| Leroy Lucas | High jump | 6 ft 4 in (1.93 m) | 10 |
| Leroy Lucas | Long jump | 21 ft 9 1/2 in (6.64 m) | 19 |
| Leroy Lucas | Triple jump | 43 ft 7 1/4 in (13.29 m) | 12 |

Key

- Note–Ranks given for track events are within the athlete's heat only
- N/A = Round not applicable for the event
