= Belize at the 2026 Commonwealth Games =

- Flag of Belize
- CG code: BIZ
- CGA: Belize Olympic and Commonwealth Games Association
- Website: belizeolympic.org

in Glasgow, Scotland 23 July 2026 – 2 August 2026
- Competitors: 5 in 3 sports
- Flag bearer: Davia Richardson
- Baton bearer: Leticia Westby
- Medals: Gold 0 Silver 0 Bronze 0 Total 0

Commonwealth Games appearances (overview)
- 1962; 1966; 1970–1974; 1978; 1982–1990; 1994; 1998; 2002; 2006; 2010; 2014; 2018; 2022; 2026; 2030

Belize competed at the 2026 Commonwealth Games in Glasgow, Scotland. This marked Belize's 15th participation at the games, after making its debut at the 1970 Commonwealth Games.

The Belizean team competed in three sports: athletics, track cycling and swimming. The King's Baton relay stopped in Belize on April 20, 2026. The team from Belize consisted of five athletes, two men and three women, competing in three sports. Swimmer Davia Richardson was the country's flagbearer during the opening ceremony. Meanwhile, chef de mission Leticia Westby was the baton bearer during the opening ceremony.

== Competitors ==
The following is the list of number of competitors participating at the Games per sport/discipline.

Sport	Men	Women	Total
Athletics	1	2	3
Swimming	0	1	1
Track cycling	1	0	1
Total	2	3	5

== Athletics ==
Belize entered three track and field athletes, one man and two women.

Key

Ranks given for track events are within the athlete's heat only.

- Q = Qualified for the next round
- q = Qualified for the next round as a fastest loser or, in field events, by position without achieving the qualifying target

Track events

Athlete	Event	Heat		Semifinal		Final	
Athlete	Event	Result	Rank	Result	Rank	Result	Rank
Brandon Adolphus	Men's 800 m	1:58.39	6	Did not Advance			
Brandon Adolphus	Men's mile	DNF		—N/a		Did not advance	
Nyasha Harris	Women's 100 m	12.22	5	Did not advance			
Nyasha Harris	Women's 200 m	25.88	7	Did not advance			

Field event

Athlete	Event	Qualification		Final	
Athlete	Event	Distance	Rank	Distance	Rank
Brooklyn Lyttle	Women's long jump	NM		Did not advance	

== Swimming ==
Belize entered one female swimmer.

Women

Athlete	Event	Heat		Semifinal		Final	
Athlete	Event	Time	Rank	Time	Rank	Time	Rank
Davia Richardson	50 m freestyle	27.68	40	Did not Advance			
Davia Richardson	100 m freestyle	1:00.74	40	Did not advance			
Davia Richardson	200 m freestyle	2:17.66	33	Did not advance			
Davia Richardson	50 m butterfly	28.86	30	Did not advance			
Davia Richardson	100 m butterfly	1:08.11	25	Did not advance			

== Track cycling ==
Belize entered one male track cyclist. Justin Williams was scheduled to represent the country, however did not compete in any events.
