= Belize at the 2022 Commonwealth Games =

- Flag of Belize
- CG code: BIZ
- CGA: Belize Olympic and Commonwealth Games Association
- Website: belizeolympic.org

in Birmingham, England 28 July 2022 – 8 August 2022
- Competitors: 13 (8 men and 5 women) in 3 sports
- Flag bearers (opening): Shaun Gill; Alicia Thompson
- Flag bearer (closing): TBD
- Medals: Gold 0 Silver 0 Bronze 0 Total 0

Commonwealth Games appearances (overview)
- 1962; 1966; 1970–1974; 1978; 1982–1990; 1994; 1998; 2002; 2006; 2010; 2014; 2018; 2022; 2026; 2030

Belize competed at the 2022 Commonwealth Games in Birmingham, England between 28 July and 8 August 2022. The team participated in the Games for the eleventh time.

The Belize team consisted of 13 athletes (eight men and five women) competing in three sports.

Shaun Gill and Alicia Thompson were the country's flagbearers during the opening ceremony.

== Competitors ==
The following is the list of number of competitors participating at the Games per sport/discipline.

Sport	Men	Women	Total
Athletics	2	3	5
Cycling	5	2	7
Triathlon	1	0	1
Total	8	5	13

== Athletics ==
A squad of five athletes (two men, three women) was confirmed on 6 July 2022.

Men
Track and road events

Athlete	Event	Heat		Semifinal		Final	
Athlete	Event	Result	Rank	Result	Rank	Result	Rank
Shaun Gill	100 m	10.76	6	Did not advance			
Brandon Jones	100 m	10.91	6	Did not advance			

Field events

Athlete	Event	Qualification		Final	
Athlete	Event	Distance	Rank	Distance	Rank
Brandon Jones	Long jump	NM	-	Did not advance	

Women
Track and road events

Athlete	Event	Heat		Semifinal		Final	
Athlete	Event	Result	Rank	Result	Rank	Result	Rank
Hilary Gladden	100 m	12.72	6	Did not advance			
Ashontie Carr	400 m	DNS		Did not advance			

Field events

Athlete	Event	Qualification		Final	
Athlete	Event	Distance	Rank	Distance	Rank
Ashantie Carr	Long jump	5.54	17	Did not advance	

== Cycling ==
A squad of seven cyclists (five men, two women) was selected on 4 May 2022.

=== Road ===
Men

Athlete	Event	Time	Rank
Giovanni Lovell	Road race	DNF	
Byron Pope	Road race	DNF	
Oscar Quiroz	Road race	3:37:08	27
Cory Williams	Road race	3:37:08	50
Justin Williams	Road race	DNS	
Giovanni Lovell	Time trial	1:03:07.68	48
Oscar Quiroz	Time trial	56:56.05	38
Cory Williams	Time trial	57:16.32	39

Women

Athlete	Event	Time	Rank
Kaya Cattouse	Road race	DNF	
Alicia Thompson	Road race	DNF	
Kaya Cattouse	Time trial	55:07.72	30

== Triathlon ==
One triathlete was officially selected on 6 July 2022.

Individual

Athlete	Event	Swim (750 m)	Trans 1	Bike (20 km)	Trans 2	Run (5 km)	Total	Rank
Kian Trejo	Men's	13:14	1:29	37:18	1:31	22:46	1:16:18	43
