= Falkland Islands at the 2010 Commonwealth Games =

- Flag of the Falkland Islands
- CG code: FLK
- CGA: Falkland Islands Overseas Games Association
- Website: fioga.co.fk

in Delhi, India
- Competitors: 15
- Flag bearer: Opening:Doug Clark Closing:Gerald Reive
- Medals: Gold 0 Silver 0 Bronze 0 Total 0

Commonwealth Games appearances (overview)
- 1982; 1986; 1990; 1994; 1998; 2002; 2006; 2010; 2014; 2018; 2022; 2026; 2030

Falkland Islands competed in the 2010 Commonwealth Games held in Delhi.

- Lawn Bowls: Gerald Reive and George Paice (Men's Pairs)
- Badminton: Sonia Arkhipkina, Michael Brownlee, Doug Clark, Anna Luxton and Laura Minto

== See also ==
- 2010 Commonwealth Games
