= Belize at the 2014 Commonwealth Games =

- CG code: BIZ
- CGA: Belize Olympic and Commonwealth Games Association
- Website: belizeolympicteam.com

in Glasgow, Scotland
- Competitors: 12 in 5 sports
- Flag bearer: Katy Sealy
- Medals: Gold 0 Silver 0 Bronze 0 Total 0

Commonwealth Games appearances (overview)
- 1962; 1966; 1970–1974; 1978; 1982–1990; 1994; 1998; 2002; 2006; 2010; 2014; 2018; 2022; 2026; 2030

Belize competed in the 2014 Commonwealth Games in Glasgow, Scotland from July 23 to August 3, 2014. A team of 12 athletes competed in 5 sports. They were accompanied by 6 officials.

== Athletics ==
Belize's athletics team consisted of 5 athletes.

Men

Athlete	Event	Round 1		Semifinal		Final	
Athlete	Event	Result	Rank	Result	Rank	Result	Rank
Mark Anderson	100 m	11.23	66	did not advance			
Mark Anderson	200 m	22.37	62	did not advance			
Kenneth Medwood	400 metres hurdles	did not compete due to injury					

Field events

Athlete	Event	Qualification		Final	
Athlete	Event	Distance	Rank	Distance	Rank
Brandon Jones	Long jump	7.09	20	did not advance	
Brandon Jones	Triple jump	15.37	16	did not advance	

Women

Athlete	Event	Round 1		Round 2		Semifinal		Final	
Athlete	Event	Result	Rank	Result	Rank	Result	Rank	Result	Rank
Kaina Martinez	100 m	12.12	30	did not advance					
Kaina Martinez	200 m	24.54	25	did not advance					

Combined events – Heptathlon

Athlete	Event	100H	HJ	SP	200 m	LJ	JT	800 m	Final	Rank
Katy Sealy	Result	15.61	1.69	10.20	27.37	5.36	34.99	2:37.61	4661 NR	9
Katy Sealy	Points	763	842	543	681	660	571	601	4661 NR	9

Key

- NR = National record

== Cycling ==
Belize's cycling team consisted of four athletes.

=== Road ===
Men

Athlete	Event	Time	Rank
Joel Borland	Road race	DNF	
Joel Borland	Time trial	59:58.98	41
Giovanni Lovell	Road race	DNF	
Giovanni Lovell	Time trial	58:21.13	29
Gregory Lovell	Road race	DNF	
Ron Vasquez	Road race	DNF	

== Shooting ==
Belize's shooting team consisted of one athlete.

Men

Athlete	Event	Qualification		Final	
Athlete	Event	Points	Rank	Points	Rank
Andrew Wigmore	Trap	79	34	did not advance	

== Table tennis ==
Belize's table tennis team consisted of one athlete. This was the first time that Belize had competed in table tennis at the Commonwealth Games.

Singles

Athlete	Event	Group Stage			Round of 64	Round of 32	Round of 16	Quarterfinals	Semifinals	Final	Rank
Athlete	Event	Opposition Result	Opposition Result	Rank	Opposition Result	Opposition Result	Opposition Result	Opposition Result	Opposition Result	Opposition Result	Rank
Tyrone Tun	Men's Singles	Mothibi (LES); L 0 - 4	McCreery (NIR); L 0 - 4	3	did not advance						

== Triathlon ==
Belize's triathlon team consisted of one athlete. This was the first time that Belize had competed in the triathlon at the Commonwealth Games.

Men

Athlete	Event	Swim (1.5 km)	Trans 1	Bike (40 km)	Trans 2	Run (10 km)	Total Time	Rank
Kent Gabourel	Men's	did not finish						
