= Belize at the 2018 Commonwealth Games =

- Flag of Belize
- CG code: BIZ
- CGA: Belize Olympic and Commonwealth Games Association
- Website: belizeolympicteam.com

in Gold Coast, Australia 4 April 2018 – 15 April 2018
- Competitors: 12 in 4 sports
- Flag bearer: Alicia Thompson (opening)
- Medals: Gold 0 Silver 0 Bronze 0 Total 0

Commonwealth Games appearances (overview)
- 1962; 1966; 1970–1974; 1978; 1982–1990; 1994; 1998; 2002; 2006; 2010; 2014; 2018; 2022; 2026; 2030

Belize competed at the 2018 Commonwealth Games in the Gold Coast, Australia from April 4 to April 15, 2018. It was Belize's 10th appearance at the Commonwealth Games.

The Belize team consisted of 12 athletes (nine men and three women) who competed in four sports.

Cyclist Alicia Thompson was the country's flag bearer during the opening ceremony.

== Competitors ==
The following is the list of several competitors participating in the Games per sport/discipline.

Sport	Men	Women	Total
Athletics (track and field)	2	2	4
Cycling	3	1	4
Table tennis	3	0	3
Triathlon	1	0	1
Total	9	3	12

== Athletics (track and field) ==
Belize entered four athletes (two per gender).

Men
Track & road events

Athlete	Event	Heat		Semifinal		Final	
Athlete	Event	Result	Rank	Result	Rank	Result	Rank
Shaun Gill	100 m	10.96	6	did not advance			
Brandon Jones	200 m	21.66	8	did not advance			

Field events

Athlete	Event	Qualification		Final	
Athlete	Event	Distance	Rank	Distance	Rank
Brandon Jones	Triple jump	14.78	18	did not advance	

Women
Track & road events

Athlete	Event	Heat		Semifinal		Final	
Athlete	Event	Result	Rank	Result	Rank	Result	Rank
Samantha Dirks	400 m	DNS		did not advance			

Combined events – Heptathlon

Athlete	Event	100H	HJ	SP	200 m	LJ	JT	800 m	Final	Rank
Katy Sealy	Result	15.18	1.69	11.40	27.64	5.13	35.51	2:35.42	4743	11
Katy Sealy	Points	818	842	621	659	595	581	627	4743	11

== Cycling ==
Belize participated with 4 athletes (3 men and 1 woman).

=== Road ===
Men

Athlete	Event	Time	Rank
Edgar Arana	Road race	DNF	
Edgar Arana	Time trial	1:01:46.77	48
Giovanni Lovell	Road race	DNF	
Giovanni Lovell	Time trial	59:00.23	40
Oscar Quiroz	Road race	DNF	
Oscar Quiroz	Time trial	59:02.25	41

Women

Athlete	Event	Time	Rank
Alicia Thompson	Road race	DNF	
Alicia Thompson	Time trial	47:03.89	19

== Table tennis ==
Belize participated with 3 athletes (3 men).

Singles

Athletes	Event	Group Stage			Round of 64	Round of 32	Round of 16	Quarterfinal	Semifinal	Final	Rank
Athletes	Event	Opposition Score	Opposition Score	Rank	Opposition Score	Opposition Score	Opposition Score	Opposition Score	Opposition Score	Opposition Score	Rank
Devesh Hukmani	Men's singles	Choong (MAS); L 0 - 4	Dalgleish (SCO); L 1 - 4	3	did not advance						
Rohit Pagarani	Men's singles	Nuopula (SOL); W 4 - 0	Loi (PNG); L 0 - 4	2	did not advance						
Terry Su	Men's singles	Miita (KIR); L 3 - 4	Medjugorac (CAN); L 0 - 4	3	did not advance						

Doubles

Athletes	Event	Round of 64	Round of 32	Round of 16	Quarterfinal	Semifinal	Final	Rank
Athletes	Event	Opposition Score	Opposition Score	Opposition Score	Opposition Score	Opposition Score	Opposition Score	Rank
Devesh Hukmani; Terry Su	Men's doubles	Bye	McBeath / Walker (ENG); L 0 - 3	did not advance				

Team

Athletes	Event	Group Stage			Round of 16	Quarterfinal	Semifinal	Final	Rank
Athletes	Event	Opposition Score	Opposition Score	Rank	Opposition Score	Opposition Score	Opposition Score	Opposition Score	Rank
Devesh Hukmani; Rohit Pagarani; Terry Su	Men's team	Nigeria; L 0 - 3	Malaysia; L 0 - 3	3	did not advance				

== Triathlon ==
Belize participated with 1 athlete (1 man).

Individual

Athlete	Event	Swim (750 m)	Trans 1	Bike (20 km)	Trans 2	Run (5 km)	Total	Rank
Brandon Santos	Men's	13:51	0:59	36:30	0:35	23:55	1:15:50	36

== See also ==
- Belize at the 2018 Summer Youth Olympics
