= Belize at the 2006 Commonwealth Games =

- CG code: BIZ
- CGA: Belize Olympic and Commonwealth Games Association
- Website: belizeolympicteam.com

in Melbourne, Australia
- Competitors: 8 Athletes (3 Women & 5 Men) in 2 sports
- Flag bearers: Opening: Closing:
- Medals: Gold 0 Silver 0 Bronze 0 Total 0

Commonwealth Games appearances (overview)
- 1962; 1966; 1970–1974; 1978; 1982–1990; 1994; 1998; 2002; 2006; 2010; 2014; 2018; 2022; 2026; 2030

The Official Logo of the Belize Commonwealth Games Association

Belize was represented at the 2006 Commonwealth Games in Melbourne. Belize won no medals at the 2006 Games, continuing the no-medal streak, since Belize started competing.

== Team ==
- Emma Wade - Women's 200m
- Grogory Lovell - Cycling
- Ian Smith - Cycling
- Jayson Jones - Men's 100m & 200m
- Kay Vaughn - Women's Triple Jump
- Mateo Cruz - Cycling
- Roger Troyer - Cycling
- Tricia Flores - Women's Long Jump & 100m
