= Saint Kitts and Nevis at the 2018 Commonwealth Games =

- Flag of Saint Kitts and Nevis
- CG code: SKN
- CGA: St. Kitts and Nevis Olympic Committee
- Website: sknoc.org

in Gold Coast, Australia 4 April 2018 – 15 April 2018
- Competitors: 7 in 3 sports
- Flag bearer: St Clair Hodge (opening)
- Medals: Gold 0 Silver 0 Bronze 0 Total 0

Commonwealth Games appearances (overview)
- 1990; 1994; 1998; 2002; 2006; 2010; 2014; 2018; 2022; 2026; 2030

Other related appearances
- Saint Christopher-Nevis-Anguilla (1978)

Saint Kitts and Nevis competed at the 2018 Commonwealth Games in the Gold Coast, Australia from April 4 to April 15, 2018.

Beach volleyball athlete St Clair Hodge was the islands' flag bearer during the opening ceremony.

== Competitors ==
The following is the list of number of competitors participating at the Games per sport/discipline.

Sport	Men	Women	Total
Athletics	2	1	3
Beach volleyball	2	0	2
Table tennis	1	1	2
Total	5	2	7

== Athletics ==
Saint Kitts and Nevis participated with 3 athletes (2 men and 1 woman). Antoine Adams, Jermaine Francis and Kristal Liburd, originally on the team did not compete.

Men
Track & road events

Athlete	Event	Heat		Semifinal		Final	
Athlete	Event	Result	Rank	Result	Rank	Result	Rank
Jason Rogers	100 m	10.34	3 q	10.21	3 q	10.24	6
Warren Hazel	400 m	46.83	4 q	47.03	7	did not advance	

Women
Track & road events

Athlete	Event	Heat		Semifinal		Final	
Athlete	Event	Result	Rank	Result	Rank	Result	Rank
Shenel Crooke	100 m	11.62	2 Q	11.69	4	did not advance	

== Beach volleyball ==
Saint Kitts and Nevis qualified a men's beach volleyball team for a total of two athletes.

Athlete	Event	Preliminary round	Standing	Quarterfinals	Semifinals	Final / BM	
Athlete	Event	Opposition Score	Standing	Opposition Score	Opposition Score	Opposition Score	Rank
Shawn Seabrookes; St Clair Hodge	Men's	Pool A Williams – Stewart (TTO); L 0–2 (14–21, 14–21); McHugh – Schumann (AUS); L 0–2 (3–21, 11–21); Korowale – Cavula (FIJ); L 0–2 (16–21, 11–21)	4	did not advance			

== Table tennis ==
Saint Kitts and Nevis participated with 2 athletes (1 man and 1 woman).

Singles

Athletes	Event	Group Stage			Round of 64	Round of 32	Round of 16	Quarterfinal	Semifinal	Final	Rank
Athletes	Event	Opposition Score	Opposition Score	Rank	Opposition Score	Opposition Score	Opposition Score	Opposition Score	Opposition Score	Opposition Score	Rank
Shakquan Hodge	Men's singles	Jayasingha (SRI); L 0–4	Tomlinson (JAM); L 0–4	3	did not advance						
Angelisa Freeman	Women's singles	Khan (PAK); L 1–4	Thomas (WAL); L 0–4	3	—N/a	did not advance					

Doubles

Athletes	Event	Round of 64	Round of 32	Round of 16	Quarterfinal	Semifinal	Final	Rank
Athletes	Event	Opposition Score	Opposition Score	Opposition Score	Opposition Score	Opposition Score	Opposition Score	Rank
Angelisa Freeman; Shakquan Hodge	Mixed doubles	Leong / Ho (MAS); L W/O	did not advance					

== See also ==
- Saint Kitts and Nevis at the 2018 Summer Youth Olympics
