= George Paice (bowls) =

Falklands Islands bowls player

Personal information
- Nationality: Falkland Islands
- Born: 20 December 1941
- Died: February 5, 2024 (aged 82) Stanley, Falkland Islands

Sport
- Sport: Lawn bowls

George Paice (20 December 1941 – 5 February 2024) was a Falkland Islands Lawn Bowler.

== Bowls career ==
He represented the Falkland Islands at the 2010 Commonwealth Games in Delhi India in the men's pairs alongside playing partner Gerald Reive. The pair achieved two victories at the games, over Guernsey and Samoa. Paice played out of the Papatoetoe Hunters Corner Bowling Club in Auckland New Zealand.

== Later life and death ==
Paice returned to the Falkland Islands in 2022, where he died on 5 February 2024.
