= Athletics at the 2014 Commonwealth Games – Women's 100 metres =

Women's 100 metres at the 2014 Commonwealth Games
- Venue: Hampden Park, Glasgow
- Dates: 27 July 2014 (heats); 28 July 2014 (semifinals and final)
- Winning time: 10.85 GR

Medalists
gold medal	Blessing Okagbare	Nigeria
silver medal	Veronica Campbell-Brown	Jamaica
bronze medal	Kerron Stewart	Jamaica

The Women's 100 metres at the 2014 Commonwealth Games, as part of the athletics programme, was held at Hampden Park on 27 and 28 July 2014.

The winning margin was 0.18 seconds which as of 2024 remains the largest winning margin for the women's 100 metres at these games since the introduction of fully automatic timing.

== Results ==
=== First round ===
The first round consisted of six heats, with qualification for the first three in each heat, and the six fastest losers overall. Nigeria's Blessing Okagbare was the fastest qualifier from the first round, at 11.20 seconds. After qualifying from the first round, Michelle-Lee Ahye of Trinidad and Tobago announced her withdrawal due to hamstring concerns.

==== Heat 1 ====
Rank	Lane	Name	Reaction Time	Result	Notes	Qual.
1	6	Veronica Campbell-Brown (JAM)	0.178	11.29		Q
2	7	Gloria Asumnu (NGR)	0.149	11.43		Q
3	3	Jade Bailey (BAR)	0.214	11.64		Q
4	5	Meritzer Williams (SKN)	0.154	11.75		q
5	2	Kaina Martinez (BIZ)	0.224	12.12		
6	8	Diane Borg (MLT)	0.164	12.12		
7	4	Milcent Ndoro (KEN)	0.165	12.18	PB	
				Wind: −0.3 m/s		

==== Heat 2 ====
Rank	Lane	Name	Reaction Time	Result	Notes	Qual.
1	2	Melissa Breen (AUS)	0.172	11.54		Q
2	7	Amy Foster (NIR)	0.147	11.62		Q
3	8	Toea Wisil (PNG)	0.183	11.64		Q
4	3	Kai Selvon (TRI)	0.221	11.66		q
5	5	Cache Armbrister (BAH)	0.167	11.83		
6	6	Michaela Kargbo (SLE)	0.159	12.33		
7	4	Younis Bese (FIJ)	0.221	12.42		
8	1	Patricia Taea (COK)	0.155	12.68		
				Wind: −0.3 m/s		

==== Heat 3 ====
Rank	Lane	Name	Reaction Time	Result	Notes	Qual.
1	4	Schillonie Calvert (JAM)	0.162	11.29		Q
2	2	Sheniqua Ferguson (BAH)	0.176	11.60		Q
3	6	Crystal Emmanuel (CAN)	0.186	11.64		Q
4	5	Flings Owusu-Agyapong (GHA)	0.141	11.68		q
5	3	Narayana Sharadha (IND)	0.155	11.81		q
6	8	Joanilla Janvier (MRI)	0.135	12.43		
7	1	Sabina Mukoswa (KEN)	0.225	12.53		
8	7	Irene Bell Bonong (CMR)	0.207	12.67		
				Wind: −0.9 m/s		

==== Heat 4 ====
Rank	Lane	Name	Reaction Time	Result	Notes	Qual.
1	6	Khamica Bingham (CAN)	0.155	11.44		Q
2	4	Michelle-Lee Ahye (TRI)	0.166	11.52		Q
3	7	Sophie Papps (ENG)	0.163	11.53		Q
4	1	Marecia Pemberton (SKN)	0.176	11.77		q
5	2	Karene King (IVB)	0.199	11.93		
6	3	Justinah Sule (NGR)	0.240	12.00		
7	8	Joanne Loutoy (SEY)	0.225	12.16		
8	5	Lovelite Detenamo (NRU)	–	–	DQ	
				Wind: 0.0 m/s		

==== Heat 5 ====
Rank	Lane	Name	Reaction Time	Result	Notes	Qual.
1	5	Blessing Okagbare (NGR)	0.171	11.20		Q
2	8	Asha Philip (ENG)	0.145	11.47		Q
3	2	Anna Ramona Papaioannou (CYP)	0.147	11.67		Q
4	7	Rachel Johncock (WAL)	0.208	11.83		
5	6	Hafsatu Kamara (SLE)	0.184	12.14		
6	3	Eugenia Tan (SIN)	0.176	12.59		
7	1	Adrine Monagi (PNG)	0.177	12.83		
8	4	Shirin Akter (BAN)	0.200	12.87		
				Wind: +0.5 m/s		

==== Heat 6 ====
Rank	Lane	Name	Reaction Time	Result	Notes	Qual.
1	3	Kerron Stewart (JAM)	0.185	11.35		Q
2	2	Bianca Williams (ENG)	0.169	11.37		Q
3	6	Shai-Anne Davis (CAN)	0.193	11.72		Q
4	8	Kamaria Durant (TRI)	0.151	11.80		q
5	4	Hannah Brier (WAL)	0.174	11.97		
6	5	Yvonne Nalishuwa (ZAM)	0.155	12.19		
7	1	Habibah Najihahbi Binte Ahmad (SIN)	0.201	12.78		
8	7	Helen Philemon (PNG)	0.204	13.12		
				Wind: −0.2 m/s		

=== Semifinals ===
==== Heat 1 ====
Rank	Lane	Name	Reaction Time	Result	Notes	Qual.
1	6	Schillonie Calvert (JAM)	0.165	11.08	=SB	Q
2	4	Asha Philip (ENG)	0.145	11.21		Q
3	7	Crystal Emmanuel (CAN)	0.170	11.43	SB	
4	8	Toea Wisil (PNG)	0.189	11.44	SB	
5	3	Melissa Breen (AUS)	0.157	11.45		
6	2	Narayana Sharadha (IND)	0.155	11.71		
7	1	Meritzer Williams (SKN)	0.181	11.79		
	5	Michelle-Lee Ahye (TRI)	–	–	DNS	
				Wind: +0.1 m/s		

==== Heat 2 ====
Rank	Lane	Name	Reaction Time	Result	Notes	Qual.
1	5	Veronica Campbell-Brown (JAM)	0.145	11.02		Q
2	4	Gloria Asumnu (NGR)	0.154	11.25	SB	Q
3	3	Khamica Bingham (CAN)	0.143	11.32	PB	q
4	6	Sheniqua Ferguson (BAH)	0.164	11.52		
5	1	Flings Owusu-Agyapong (GHA)	0.123	11.55		
6	7	Anna Ramona Papaioannou (CYP)	0.156	11.61		
7	8	Sophie Papps (ENG)	0.163	11.61		
8	2	Kamaria Durant (TRI)	0.152	11.70		
				Wind: +0.5 m/s		

==== Heat 3 ====
Rank	Lane	Name	Reaction Time	Result	Notes	Qual.
1	4	Blessing Okagbare (NGR)	0.185	10.93	SB	Q
2	3	Kerron Stewart (JAM)	0.176	11.20	SB	Q
3	6	Bianca Williams (ENG)	0.181	11.34		q
4	7	Shai-Anne Davis (CAN)	0.166	11.52		
5	5	Amy Foster (NIR)	0.142	11.54		
6	1	Kai Selvon (TRI)	0.198	11.59		
7	2	Marecia Pemberton (SKN)	0.164	11.72		
8	8	Jade Bailey (BAR)	0.206	11.74		
				Wind: −0.7 m/s		

=== Final ===
Rank	Lane	Name	Reaction Time	Result	Notes
1st place, gold medalist(s)	5	Blessing Okagbare (NGR)	0.144	10.85	GR
2nd place, silver medalist(s)	4	Veronica Campbell-Brown (JAM)	0.154	11.03	
3rd place, bronze medalist(s)	3	Kerron Stewart (JAM)	0.161	11.07	SB
4	8	Asha Philip (ENG)	0.138	11.18	PB
5	6	Schillonie Calvert (JAM)	0.141	11.21	
6	2	Bianca Williams (ENG)	0.169	11.31	
7	1	Khamica Bingham (CAN)	0.135	11.37	
8	7	Gloria Asumnu (NGR)	0.148	11.41	
				Wind: +0.3 m/s	
