= Table tennis at the 2018 Commonwealth Games – Men's singles =

Table tennis – Men's singles at the 2018 Commonwealth Games
- Venue: Oxenford Studios
- Dates: 10 – 15 April 2018
- Competitors: 76 from 33 nations

Medalists
gold medal	Gao Ning	Singapore
silver medal	Quadri Aruna	Nigeria
bronze medal	Sharath Kamal	India

Table tennis men's singles at the 2018 Commonwealth Games was held at the Oxenford Studios on the Gold Coast, Australia from 10 to 15 April.

== Main draw ==
=== Finals ===
Semifinals
1	Quadri Aruna (NGR)	12	11	11	11
4	Sharath Kamal (IND)	10	9	9	7
3	Gao Ning (SGP)	11	11	13	11
8	Samuel Walker (ENG)	5	5	11	4

Gold medal match
1	Quadri Aruna (NGR)	7	8	11	11	9	5
3	Gao Ning (SGP)	11	11	5	3	11	11
Bronze medal match
4	Sharath Kamal (IND)	11	11	9	11	12
8	Samuel Walker (ENG)	7	9	11	6	10

=== Top half ===
==== Section 1 ====
Round of 64
M Medjugorac (CAN)	11	5	6	5	7
Leong CF (MAS)	8	11	11	11	11

Round of 32
1	Q Aruna (NGR)	11	11	11	12
B Chan YF (MRI)	4	8	4	10
A Tumaini (TAN)	6	4	2	3
11	Pang XJ (SGP)	11	11	11	11
15	Xin Y (AUS)	2	5	11	11	8
Leong CF (MAS)	11	11	13	9	11
G Loi (PNG)	4	3	1	2
7	H Desai (IND)	11	11	11	11

Round of 16
1	Q Aruna (NGR)	11	8	11	11	12
11	Pang XJ (SGP)	5	11	5	5	10
Leong CF (MAS)	5	7	5	11	4
7	H Desai (IND)	11	11	11	7	11

Quarterfinals
1	Q Aruna (NGR)	11	11	11	11
7	H Desai (IND)	9	8	9	8

==== Section 2 ====
Round of 64
B Abiodun (NGR)	13	8	11	11	11
O Cathcart (NIR)	11	11	2	7	7

Round of 32
6	L Pitchford (ENG)	13	9	11	11	11
B Abiodun (NGR)	11	11	7	4	7
B Jayasingha (SRI)	5	4	3	3
10	C Rumgay (SCO)	11	11	11	11
13	H Hu (AUS)	11	11	11	11
B Sam (GHA)	2	8	6	4
J Choong (MAS)	2	5	4	11	13	11	7
4	S Kamal (IND)	11	11	11	7	11	6	11

Round of 16
6	L Pitchford (ENG)	11	9	11	11	11
10	C Rumgay (SCO)	6	11	1	8	2
13	H Hu (AUS)	8	10	11	6	5
4	S Kamal (IND)	11	12	8	11	11

Quarterfinals
6	L Pitchford (ENG)	11	11	12	9	7	9
4	S Kamal (IND)	9	13	10	11	11	11

=== Bottom half ===
==== Section 3 ====
Round of 64
A Yogarajah (MRI)	7	7	9	14	7
D Abrefa (GHA)	11	11	11	12	11

Round of 32
3	Gao N (SGP)	11	11	11	11
C Howieson (SCO)	2	6	6	6
AH Rizal (MAS)	11	9	11	11	11
9	D Powell (AUS)	9	11	6	9	5
14	Wang Z (CAN)	11	7	11	11	14
D Abrefa (GHA)	3	11	3	2	12
A Robinson (NIR)	4	8	4	5
5	P Drinkhall (ENG)	11	11	11	11

Round of 16
3	Gao N (SGP)	11	11	11	11
AH Rizal (MAS)	3	5	7	7
14	Wang Z (CAN)	8	11	13	8	11	11
5	P Drinkhall (ENG)	11	7	11	11	8	4

Quarterfinals
3	Gao N (SGP)	10	11	11	11	11
14	Wang Z (CAN)	12	6	5	6	9

==== Section 4 ====
Round of 64
A Bernadet (CAN)	11	6	11	11	11
R Sirisena (SRI)	9	11	9	3	9

Round of 32
8	S Walker (ENG)	11	11	11	17
A Bernadet (CAN)	7	5	8	15
P McCreery (NIR)	11	12	11	12
16	E Poh SF (SGP)	5	10	5	10
12	S Toriola (NGR)	11	11	10	11	11
A Wilson (TTO)	7	1	12	3	3
M Rameez (PAK)	5	3	5	5
2	S Gnanasekaran (IND)	11	11	11	11

Round of 16
8	S Walker (ENG)	11	11	11	11
P McCreery (NIR)	6	8	3	4
12	S Toriola (NGR)	7	5^{r}
2	S Gnanasekaran (IND)	11	9

Quarterfinals
8	S Walker (ENG)	11	11	13	17
2	S Gnanasekaran (IND)	8	8	11	15

== Preliminary stage ==
=== Group 1 ===
Name	MP	MW	ML	GW	GL
Marko Medjugorac (CAN)	2	2	0	8	0
Tauramoa Kiita (KIR)	2	1	1	4	7
Terry Su (BIZ)	2	0	2	3	8

Date		Score		Set 1	Set 2	Set 3	Set 4	Set 5	Set 6	Set 7
10 Apr	Marko Medjugorac (CAN)	4–0	Tauramoa Kiita (KIR)	11–7	11–5	11–1	11–6			
10 Apr	Terry Su (BIZ)	3–4	Tauramoa Kiita (KIR)	8–11	11–4	5–11	9–11	12–10	12–10	12–14
10 Apr	Marko Medjugorac (CAN)	4–0	Terry Su (BIZ)	11–5	11–2	11–1	11–5			

=== Group 2 ===
Name	MP	MW	ML	GW	GL
Aaron Wilson (TTO)	2	2	0	8	1
Yoshua Shing (VAN)	2	1	1	5	4
Kalton Melton (TUV)	2	0	2	0	8

Date		Score		Set 1	Set 2	Set 3	Set 4	Set 5	Set 6	Set 7
10 Apr	Yoshua Shing (VAN)	4–0	Kalton Melton (TUV)	11–4	11–5	11–4	11–4			
10 Apr	Aaron Wilson (TTO)	4–0	Kalton Melton (TUV)	11–3	11–1	11–4	11–6			
10 Apr	Yoshua Shing (VAN)	1–4	Aaron Wilson (TTO)	13–15	6–11	11–8	7–11	11–13		

=== Group 3 ===
Name	MP	MW	ML	GW	GL
Leong Chee Feng (MAS)	2	2	0	8	1
Felix Lartey (GHA)	2	1	1	4	5
Yuvraaj Dookram (TTO)	2	0	2	2	8

Date		Score		Set 1	Set 2	Set 3	Set 4	Set 5	Set 6	Set 7
10 Apr	Leong Chee Feng (MAS)	4–1	Yuvraaj Dookram (TTO)	11–6	11–7	11–6	9–11	11–3		
10 Apr	Felix Lartey (GHA)	4–1	Yuvraaj Dookram (TTO)	11–5	11–3	11–6	5–11	11–9		
10 Apr	Leong Chee Feng (MAS)	4–0	Felix Lartey (GHA)	11–3	11–9	11–8	14–12			

=== Group 4 ===
Name	MP	MW	ML	GW	GL
Derek Abrefa (GHA)	2	2	0	8	0
Allie Johnny (KIR)	2	1	1	4	5
Emmanuel Gboyah (SLE)	2	0	2	1	8

Date		Score		Set 1	Set 2	Set 3	Set 4	Set 5	Set 6	Set 7
10 Apr	Derek Abrefa (GHA)	4–0	Emmanuel Gboyah (SLE)	11–5	11–1	11–4	11–5			
10 Apr	Allie Johnny (KIR)	4–1	Emmanuel Gboyah (SLE)	6–11	11–7	12–10	11–6	11–5		
10 Apr	Derek Abrefa (GHA)	4–0	Allie Johnny (KIR)	11–3	11–3	11–8	11–9			

=== Group 5 ===
Name	MP	MW	ML	GW	GL
Bode Abiodun (NGR)	2	2	0	8	0
Nooa Takooa (KIR)	2	1	1	4	6
Rene Benjamin (SLE)	2	0	2	2	8

Date		Score		Set 1	Set 2	Set 3	Set 4	Set 5	Set 6	Set 7
10 Apr	Bode Abiodun (NGR)	4–0	Rene Benjamin (SLE)	11–3	11–3	11–5	11–3			
10 Apr	Nooa Takooa (KIR)	4–2	Rene Benjamin (SLE)	12–10	11–5	2–11	10–12	11–9	11–9	
10 Apr	Bode Abiodun (NGR)	4–0	Nooa Takooa (KIR)	11–3	11–1	11–4	11–7			

=== Group 6 ===
Name	MP	MW	ML	GW	GL
Akhilen Yogarajah (MRI)	2	2	0	8	2
Godfrey Sultan (SEY)	2	1	1	4	5
Fahad Khawaja (PAK)	2	0	2	3	8

Date		Score		Set 1	Set 2	Set 3	Set 4	Set 5	Set 6	Set 7
10 Apr	Godfrey Sultan (SEY)	4–1	Fahad Khawaja (PAK)	8–11	13–11	11–8	11–9	11–8		
10 Apr	Akhilen Yogarajah (MRI)	4–2	Fahad Khawaja (PAK)	11–3	11–7	11–7	4–11	9–11	12–10	
10 Apr	Godfrey Sultan (SEY)	0–4	Akhilen Yogarajah (MRI)	8–11	5–11	3–11	4–11			

=== Group 7 ===
Name	MP	MW	ML	GW	GL
Amoni Tumaini (TAN)	2	2	0	8	2
Vicky Wu (FIJ)	2	1	1	6	4
Tulimanu Vaea (TUV)	2	0	2	0	8

Date		Score		Set 1	Set 2	Set 3	Set 4	Set 5	Set 6	Set 7
10 Apr	Vicky Wu (FIJ)	4–0	Tulimanu Vaea (TUV)	11–6	11–5	11–4	11–2			
10 Apr	Amoni Tumaini (TAN)	4–0	Tulimanu Vaea (TUV)	11–3	11–4	11–8	11–5			
10 Apr	Vicky Wu (FIJ)	2–4	Amoni Tumaini (TAN)	6–11	11–9	8–11	11–8	6–11	6–11	

=== Group 8 ===
Name	MP	MW	ML	GW	GL
Geoffrey Loi (PNG)	2	2	0	8	0
Rohit Pagarani (BIZ)	2	1	1	4	4
Gary Nuopula (SOL)	2	0	2	0	8

Date		Score		Set 1	Set 2	Set 3	Set 4	Set 5	Set 6	Set 7
10 Apr	Geoffrey Loi (PNG)	4–0	Gary Nuopula (SOL)	11–5	11–3	16–14	11–6			
10 Apr	Rohit Pagarani (BIZ)	4–0	Gary Nuopula (SOL)	11–5	11–7	11–7	12–10			
10 Apr	Geoffrey Loi (PNG)	4–0	Rohit Pagarani (BIZ)	11–5	11–7	11–9	11–8			

=== Group 9 ===
Name	MP	MW	ML	GW	GL
Muhammad Rameez (PAK)	2	2	0	8	0
Kristian Doughty (BAR)	2	1	1	4	6
Brian Ndunda Mutua (KEN)	2	0	2	2	8

Date		Score		Set 1	Set 2	Set 3	Set 4	Set 5	Set 6	Set 7
10 Apr	Muhammad Rameez (PAK)	4–0	Kristian Doughty (BAR)	11–9	11–4	11–7	11–9			
10 Apr	Brian Ndunda Mutua (KEN)	2–4	Kristian Doughty (BAR)	9–11	10–12	13–11	10–12	11–2	10–12	
10 Apr	Muhammad Rameez (PAK)	4–0	Brian Ndunda Mutua (KEN)	11–6	11–6	11–8	11–7			

=== Group 10 ===
Name	MP	MW	ML	GW	GL
Buwaneka Jayasingha (SRI)	2	2	0	8	3
Simon Tomlinson (JAM)	2	1	1	7	4
Shakquan Hodge (SKN)	2	0	2	0	8

Date		Score		Set 1	Set 2	Set 3	Set 4	Set 5	Set 6	Set 7
10 Apr	Buwaneka Jayasingha (SRI)	4–0	Shakquan Hodge (SKN)	11–3	11–1	11–3	11–2			
10 Apr	Simon Tomlinson (JAM)	4–0	Shakquan Hodge (SKN)	11–1	11–4	11–4	11–1			
10 Apr	Buwaneka Jayasingha (SRI)	4–3	Simon Tomlinson (JAM)	10–12	11–4	11–6	9–11	11–9	11–9	

=== Group 11 ===
Name	MP	MW	ML	GW	GL
Ashley Robinson (NIR)	2	2	0	8	0
Dexter St. Louis (TTO)	2	1	1	4	4
Ronald Nyaika (UGA)	2	0	2	0	8

Date		Score		Set 1	Set 2	Set 3	Set 4	Set 5	Set 6	Set 7
10 Apr	Ashley Robinson (NIR)	4–0	Ronald Nyaika (UGA)	11–6	11–3	11–2	11–8			
10 Apr	Dexter St. Louis (TTO)	4–0	Ronald Nyaika (UGA)	11–6	11–4	11–8	11–3			
10 Apr	Ashley Robinson (NIR)	4–0	Dexter St. Louis (TTO)	11–2	11–6	14–12	11–8			

=== Group 12 ===
Name	MP	MW	ML	GW	GL
Owen Cathcart (NIR)	2	2	0	8	3
Imesh Ranasingha (SRI)	2	1	1	7	4
Andre Mitchell (SVG)	2	0	2	0	8

Date		Score		Set 1	Set 2	Set 3	Set 4	Set 5	Set 6	Set 7
10 Apr	Imesh Ranasingha (SRI)	4–0	Andre Mitchell (SVG)	11–1	11–2	11–5	11–4			
10 Apr	Owen Cathcart (NIR)	4–0	Andre Mitchell (SVG)	11–5	11–3	11–1	11–3			
10 Apr	Imesh Ranasingha (SRI)	3–4	Owen Cathcart (NIR)	11–8	8–11	6–11	11–6	8–11	11–5	4–11

=== Group 13 ===
Name	MP	MW	ML	GW	GL
Asyraf Haiqal Rizal (MAS)	2	2	0	8	2
Kane Watson (JAM)	2	1	1	6	4
Carlton Daniel (SVG)	2	0	2	0	8

Date		Score		Set 1	Set 2	Set 3	Set 4	Set 5	Set 6	Set 7
10 Apr	Asyraf Haiqal Rizal (MAS)	4–0	Carlton Daniel (SVG)	11–4	11–4	11–4	11–5			
10 Apr	Kane Watson (JAM)	4–0	Carlton Daniel (SVG)	11–7	11–7	11–2	11–7			
10 Apr	Asyraf Haiqal Rizal (MAS)	4–2	Kane Watson (JAM)	10–12	11–9	12–10	8–11	11–6	11–3	

=== Group 14 ===
Name	MP	MW	ML	GW	GL
Antoine Bernadet (CAN)	2	2	0	8	4
Shemar Britton (GUY)	2	1	1	7	4
Masoud Mtalaso (TAN)	2	0	2	1	8

Date		Score		Set 1	Set 2	Set 3	Set 4	Set 5	Set 6	Set 7
10 Apr	Antoine Bernadet (CAN)	4–1	Masoud Mtalaso (TAN)	11–7	11–8	11–5	7–11	11–1		
10 Apr	Shemar Britton (GUY)	4–0	Masoud Mtalaso (TAN)	11–4	11–2	11–4	11–2			
10 Apr	Antoine Bernadet (CAN)	4–3	Shemar Britton (GUY)	8–11	5–11	11–6	11–3	11–9	13–15	11–3

=== Group 15 ===
Name	MP	MW	ML	GW	GL
Rohan Sirisena (SRI)	2	2	0	8	0
Ham Lulu (VAN)	2	1	1	4	4
Adrian Rollins (BAH)	2	0	2	0	8

Date		Score		Set 1	Set 2	Set 3	Set 4	Set 5	Set 6	Set 7
10 Apr	Rohan Sirisena (SRI)	4–0	Adrian Rollins (BAH)	11–3	11–2	11–4	11–6			
10 Apr	Ham Lulu (VAN)	4–0	Adrian Rollins (BAH)	11–3	11–7	11–6	11–5			
10 Apr	Rohan Sirisena (SRI)	4–0	Ham Lulu (VAN)	11–6	11–5	12–10	11–5			

=== Group 16 ===
Name	MP	MW	ML	GW	GL
Craig Howieson (SCO)	2	2	0	8	0
Rhikesh Taucoory (MRI)	2	1	1	4	6
Mark Dowell (BAR)	2	0	2	2	8

Date		Score		Set 1	Set 2	Set 3	Set 4	Set 5	Set 6	Set 7
10 Apr	Craig Howieson (SCO)	4–0	Rhikesh Taucoory (MRI)	11–8	11–4	11–9	12–10			
10 Apr	Mark Dowell (BAR)	2–4	Rhikesh Taucoory (MRI)	11–8	12–10	10–12	5–11	6–11	8–11	
10 Apr	Craig Howieson (SCO)	4–0	Mark Dowell (BAR)	11–6	11–8	11–7	11–8			

=== Group 17 ===
Name	MP	MW	ML	GW	GL
Javen Choong (MAS)	2	2	0	8	1
Colin Dalgleish (SCO)	2	1	1	5	5
Devesh Hukmani (BIZ)	2	0	2	1	8

Date		Score		Set 1	Set 2	Set 3	Set 4	Set 5	Set 6	Set 7
10 Apr	Javen Choong (MAS)	4–0	Devesh Hukmani (BIZ)	11–9	11–4	11–7	11–5			
10 Apr	Colin Dalgleish (SCO)	4–1	Devesh Hukmani (BIZ)	4–11	11–6	11–6	11–3	11–6		
10 Apr	Javen Choong (MAS)	4–1	Colin Dalgleish (SCO)	10–12	11–4	11–8	11–6	11–5		

=== Group 18 ===
Name	MP	MW	ML	GW	GL
Brian Chan Yook Fo (MRI)	2	2	0	8	1
Christopher Franklin (GUY)	2	1	1	5	4
Romano Spencer (SVG)	2	0	2	0	8

Date		Score		Set 1	Set 2	Set 3	Set 4	Set 5	Set 6	Set 7
10 Apr	Christopher Franklin (GUY)	4–0	Romano Spencer (SVG)	11–5	11–4	11–2	11–5			
10 Apr	Brian Chan Yook Fo (MRI)	4–0	Romano Spencer (SVG)	11–8	11–5	11–2	11–7			
10 Apr	Christopher Franklin (GUY)	1–4	Brian Chan Yook Fo (MRI)	5–11	11–7	8–11	6–11	4–11		

=== Group 19 ===
Name	MP	MW	ML	GW	GL
Paul McCreery (NIR)	2	2	0	8	0
Kennedy Katungu (ZAM)	2	1	1	4	5
Philip Wing (FIJ)	2	0	2	1	8

Date		Score		Set 1	Set 2	Set 3	Set 4	Set 5	Set 6	Set 7
10 Apr	Paul McCreery (NIR)	4–0	Kennedy Katungu (ZAM)	11–4	11–6	11–7	11–6			
10 Apr	Philip Wing (FIJ)	1–4	Kennedy Katungu (ZAM)	9–11	5–11	11–9	6–11	11–13		
10 Apr	Paul McCreery (NIR)	4–0	Philip Wing (FIJ)	11–4	11–3	11–6	11–4			

=== Group 20 ===
Name	MP	MW	ML	GW	GL
Bernard Sam (GHA)	2	2	0	8	5
Tyrese Knight (BAR)	2	1	1	7	5
Nigel Bryan (GUY)	2	0	2	3	8

Date		Score		Set 1	Set 2	Set 3	Set 4	Set 5	Set 6	Set 7
10 Apr	Nigel Bryan (GUY)	2–4	Bernard Sam (GHA)	4–11	11–9	9–11	4–11	12–10	8–11	
10 Apr	Tyrese Knight (BAR)	3–4	Bernard Sam (GHA)	11–3	11–6	11–8	6–11	7–11	3–11	8–11
10 Apr	Nigel Bryan (GUY)	1–4	Tyrese Knight (BAR)	12–14	6–11	7–11	11–4	6–11		
