= Gerald Reive =

Falkland Islands athlete (born 1937)

Personal information
- Nationality: Falkland Islands
- Born: 10 March 1937 (age 88) Stanley Falkland Islands

Sport
- Sport: Lawn bowls

Gerald Reive (born 10 March 1937) is a New Zealand-based Falkland Islands lawn bowler.

== Bowls career ==
He represented his country at the 2010 Commonwealth Games in New Delhi, India in Lawn Bowls in the men's pairs event, alongside his playing partner George Paice. They achieved wins against Samoa and Guernsey. Reive was the flag bearer for the Falkland Islands at the closing ceremony. He currently plays lawn bowls at the Papatoetoe Hunters Corner Bowling Club in Auckland. He attended his second Commonwealth Games in Glasgow 2014 where he entered the men's fours with Michael Reive, Patrick Morrison, and Barry Ford.
