= Marecia Pemberton =

Saint Kitts and Nevis sprinter (born 1990)

Personal information
- Born: 7 January 1990 (age 35)

Sport
- Sport: Track and field
- Event: 100 metres

Marecia Pemberton (born 7 January 1990) is a retired Kittian sprinter.

She competed collegiately for the Florida State Seminoles from 2010 to 2014. Individually she reached the semi-final at the 2014 Commonwealth Games and competed at the 2015 Pan American Games, both in the 100 metres. She also finished sixth in the 4 × 100 metres relay at the 2008 World Junior Championships.

Her personal best times were 11.29 seconds in the 100 metres, achieved in May 2010 in Greensboro; and 23.67 seconds in the 200 metres, achieved in April 2011 in Tallahassee.
