= Solomon Islands at the Commonwealth Games =

- Flag of the Solomon Islands
- CGF code: SOL
- CGA: National Olympic Committee of Solomon Islands
- Website: oceaniasport.com/solomon
- Medals Ranked 0th: Gold 0 Silver 0 Bronze 1 Total 1

Commonwealth Games appearances (overview)
- 1982; 1986; 1990; 1994; 1998; 2002; 2006; 2010; 2014; 2018; 2022; 2026; 2030

Solomon Islands has competed at eight Commonwealth Games, making their first appearance in 1982. They did not send a team in 1986, but have appeared at every Games since 1990. The Solomons' first Commonwealth Games medal was won in 2018 by weightlifter Jenly Tegu Wini.

== Overall Medal Tally ==
Games	Gold	Silver	Bronze	Total
1982 Brisbane	0	0	0	0
1986 Edinburgh	did not attend			
1990 Auckland	0	0	0	0
1994 Victoria	0	0	0	0
1998 Kuala Lumpur	0	0	0	0
2002 Manchester	0	0	0	0
2006 Melbourne	0	0	0	0
2010 Delhi	0	0	0	0
2014 Glasgow	0	0	0	0
2018 Gold Coast	0	0	1	1
2022 Birmingham	0	0	0	0
Total	0	0	1	1

== List of medalists ==
Medal	Name	Games	Sport	Event
Bronze	Jenly Tegu Wini	2018 Gold Coast	Weightlifting	Women's 58 kg
