= South Arabia at the Commonwealth Games =

Federation of South Arabia at the Commonwealth Games
- Flag of the Federation of South Arabia
- CG code: FSA
- Medals: Gold 0 Silver 0 Bronze 0 Total 0

Commonwealth Games appearances (overview)
- 1962; 1966

Aden, then South Arabia, competed twice in the Commonwealth Games; in 1962 as Aden, and in 1966 as South Arabia.

In 1967 the Federation of South Arabia left the Commonwealth, becoming part of the People's Republic of South Yemen, and in 1990 part of the Republic of Yemen.

== 1962, Perth ==
The Colony of Aden sent a team to the 1962 British Empire and Commonwealth Games at Perth, Australia but did not win any medals.

The Aden Team captain was policeman Nasser Ahmed Salem, aged 29 and a father of seven. Other team members were: David Griffiths, a second lieutenant in the King's Own Scottish Borderers who ran the half-mile and mile, and who two months before had led one of two platoons which battled ten thousand rioters in Aden; Michael Shaw, married with two children, and a corporal in the Royal Air Force who ran the sprints and the last leg of the relay: Hector McNiven-Young, manager; Raymond Dodds, coach; Alastair Cook, a lieutenant in the Royal Marine Commandos, who was entered for the sprints; Christopher Salole, who competed in the sprint hurdles; Said Adeeb, a sub inspector in the police who was entered in the mile and 3 mile; Ali Mattar, a student teacher who was entered in the sprints and was part of the relay team; Deria Mohd, a student who entered the mile and half-mile, and Yessin Deria, a clerk who entered the 100 yards and relay.

== 1966, Jamaica ==
The Federation of South Arabia sent a team to the 1966 British Empire and Commonwealth Games at Kingston, Jamaica but did not win any medals. The team consisted of Yassin Abdi (who competed in the 100 yards and 200 yards races), Mohamed Ismail (who entered the 1 mile race, but did not start, and competed in the 3 miles race) and R Tolliday (a wrestler in the 62 kg freestyle wrestling).
