= Saint Kitts and Nevis at the Commonwealth Games =

- CGF code: SKN
- CGA: St. Kitts and Nevis Olympic Committee
- Website: sknoc.org
- Medals Ranked 48th: Gold 1 Silver 0 Bronze 0 Total 1

Commonwealth Games appearances (overview)
- 1990; 1994; 1998; 2002; 2006; 2010; 2014; 2018; 2022; 2026; 2030

Other related appearances
- Saint Christopher-Nevis-Anguilla (1978)

Saint Kitts and Nevis have participated in eight Commonwealth Games. Their first appearance came in 1978 as part of Saint Christopher-Nevis-Anguilla, but they did not appear again until 1990. They have won a single medal, gold in the 2002 100 metres from Kim Collins.

== Medals ==
Games	Gold	Silver	Bronze	Total
1978 Edmonton	0	0	0	0
1982 Brisbane	did not attend			
1986 Edinburgh	did not attend			
1990 Auckland	0	0	0	0
1994 Victoria	0	0	0	0
1998 Kuala Lumpur	0	0	0	0
2002 Manchester	1	0	0	1
2006 Melbourne	0	0	0	0
2010 Delhi	0	0	0	0
2014 Glasgow	0	0	0	0
2018 Gold Coast	0	0	0	0
Total	1	0	0	1
