= Belize at the Commonwealth Games =

- CGF code: BIZ
- CGA: Belize Olympic and Commonwealth Games Association
- Website: belizeolympic.org
- Medals: Gold 0 Silver 0 Bronze 0 Total 0

Commonwealth Games appearances (overview)
- 1962; 1966; 1970–1974; 1978; 1982–1990; 1994; 1998; 2002; 2006; 2010; 2014; 2018; 2022; 2026; 2030

Belize has participated in nine Commonwealth Games. The first two participations, in 1962 and 1966 were as British Honduras, with the first as Belize coming in 1978, in Edmonton. After the 1978 Games, Belize did not participate for 16 years, but has appeared at every Games since 1994, in Victoria, British Columbia. However, they have yet to win a medal.
