= Togo at the Commonwealth Games =

- Flag of Togo
- CG code: TOG
- CGA: Togolese National Olympic Committee
- Website: cnodutogo.org
- Medals: Gold 0 Silver 0 Bronze 0 Total 0

Commonwealth Games appearances (overview)
- 2026; 2030

Togo is scheduled to make its debut at the Commonwealth Games' at the 2026 edition in Glasgow, Scotland. The country joined the Commonwealth of Nations in 2022.

== See also ==
- Togo at the Olympics
