= Falkland Islands at the Commonwealth Games =

- Flag of the Falkland Islands
- CGF code: FLK (FAI used at these Games)
- CGA: Falkland Islands Overseas Games Association
- Website: fioga.co.fk
- Medals: Gold 0 Silver 0 Bronze 0 Total 0

Commonwealth Games appearances (overview)
- 1982; 1986; 1990; 1994; 1998; 2002; 2006; 2010; 2014; 2018; 2022; 2026; 2030

The Falkland Islands has competed in nine editions of the Commonwealth Games. Their first appearance was in 1982, just months after the Falklands War.

== History ==
The Glasgow 2014 Games saw the Falkland Islands send 23 competitors in three disciplines: Badminton, Lawn Bowls and Shooting. To date, the Falkland Islands has not won any medals.

Louis Baillon is the only Falkland Islander to have become an Olympic champion, as a member of the British field hockey team which won a gold medal in 1908.

== See also ==
- 1982 Commonwealth Games opening ceremony
