= Ireland at the British Empire Games =

Ireland at the 1930 Commonwealth Games
- Representative flag of Ireland
- CGF code: IRE
- Medals Ranked 9th: Gold 0 Silver 1 Bronze 0 Total 1

Commonwealth Games appearances (overview)
- 1930

Other related appearances
- Northern Ireland (1934–pres.)

Representation of the island of Ireland at the British Empire Games (now the Commonwealth Games) has varied:

- At the first games in 1930, a single team represented the entire island.
- Irish athletes competed at the 1934 games though the affiliations of several of these to either Northern Ireland or the Irish Free State are unclear.
- Since the 1938 games, there has been a Northern Ireland team only.

== 1930 games ==
The organising committee for the 1930 games in Hamilton, Ontario sent an invitation to the National Athletic and Cycling Association (NACA), and offered to pay $1000 towards travel expenses. It also invited the Irish Amateur Boxing Association (IABA), which declined in order to concentrate on the 1932 Olympics. The NACA executive decided to accept, on condition that the team be designated "Ireland" rather than "Irish Free State". The NACA was affiliated to the International Amateur Athletics Federation (IAAF) and regarded itself as the governing body for athletics in the whole of Ireland, although a separate Northern Ireland Amateur Athletic, Cycling and Cross Country Association (NIAAA) was affiliated to the Amateur Athletic Association of England (AAA). NIAAA athletes, including some born in the Free State, were included on the AAA's England team.

The NACA's attendance of the games proved to be controversial among some of its members who held Irish nationalist views. Sean Ryan, the President of the Gaelic Athletic Association, publicly dissociated himself from the NACA, and the Crokes club of one of the selected athletes voted to disband in protest.

The NACA made a shortlist of athletes whom it would fund for the trip to Canada if they could secure the necessary time off work. The NACA was careful to include an athlete from Northern Ireland to assert its all-island jurisdiction. The English AAA offered to pay the expenses of hammer thrower Bill Britton on condition that he and Pat O'Callaghan take part in a British Empire athletics team to compete in a challenge match against the United States immediately after the Empire Games. The NACA rejected this offer. In the event, O'Callaghan went to the 1930 International University Games in Germany, making him unavailable for the Empire Games. Neither Britton nor any other Irish athlete was in the Empire challenge selection. Ultimately four Irish-based athletes travelled. They were joined by a fifth, P. "Jack" O'Reilly, who was already living in Canada; O'Reilly wrote to the NACA asking to be nominated for the marathon and offering to pay his own way.

The Irish team's ship was delayed by fog and the team missed the opening ceremony, except for O'Reilly, who carried the flag. The flag was not the Irish tricolour, considered by unionists as specific to the Free State; instead it showed the coat of arms of Ireland, a gold harp. The team colour was green, and singlets included the shamrock symbol.

=== Results ===
Competitors for Ireland at the 1930 British Empire Games
Athlete	Club	Event(s)	Result	Notes
Bill Britton	Cavan	Hammer	2nd	Narrowly lost to Malcolm Nokes, whom he had beaten at the 1928 AAA championships.
Michael O'Malley	Westport	880 yds/ mile	—/?	Missed 880 yds heats owing to delayed arrival of ship.
William (Note: "William" in caption to contemporary photo. Elsewhere, Dickson's initials are variously given as: W.; W.A.; J.A.; and N.F.) Dickson	North Belfast Harriers	880 yds/ mile	—/?	Missed 880 yds heats owing to delayed arrival of ship.
Patrick J.B. "Joe" Eustace	Crokes (Dublin)	100 yds / 220 yds	3rd in heat 1 / —	Missed 220 yds heats owing to delayed arrival of ship. Crokes disbanded in protest at the NACA sending a team to the Empire Games.
P. "Jack" O'Reilly	Galway	Marathon	9th	Based in Canada at time of Games, O'Reilly had won the Irish marathon title in 1924–5–6–7, and later came second in the 1931 Canadian championship.

== 1934 games ==
Liston and Maguire state, "Contradictory media and sports reports exist regarding a team representing Ireland and/or Northern Ireland in 1934". Colonel Evan Hunter, of the 1934 organising committee, (Note: Hunter was also secretary of the English AAA, the newly formed Empire Games Federation, and the British Olympic Association) opposed an all-island team, stating that teams must have "the political style and title of the respective territories by which they are known within the British Empire". The English AAA invited the NIAAA to nominate competitors to represent Northern Ireland in athletics, cycling, boxing, and swimming; the NIAAA regulated only the former two sports, for which it nominated athletes who competed.

The AAA separately invited the NACA nominate competitors to represent the Free State. The AAA's view conformed to a 1933 IAAF decision to require member associations to be delimited by political borders; the NACA had objected to that and would later be expelled from the IAAF as a consequence. NACA declined the invitation to the Empire Games, although it accepted a contemporaneous invitation to an international meeting in Scotland at which the NIAAA would field a separate Northern Ireland team. An AAA meeting preparatory to the games reported Northern Ireland among the teams to be represented, but not the Irish Free State. Paddy Bermingham, a Garda from County Clare, was entered in the discus but did not compete, although he won the English AAA title the previous month at the same White City Stadium which hosted the Games. The Commonwealth Games Federation (CGF) lists Bermingham under "Northern Ireland" in the entries, while a contemporary preview lists him as from the Irish Free State, as does Bob Phillips. The Association of Track and Field Statisticians lists him as "Ireland" and "did not compete".

The Irish Amateur Swimming Association (IASA) refused to send teams for the Free State or Northern Ireland, pointing out that the bowling team was designated "Ireland" and that Jersey competitors were on the England team. For similar reasons, the IASA boycotted the 1948 Olympic swimming gala, also in London.

The IABA in February declined to send a team, stating that the games were during its close season. In March, William Grant asked in the House of Commons of Northern Ireland whether, in the absence of IABA participation, the Royal Ulster Constabulary (RUC) boxing club might represent Northern Ireland. In May, four IABA boxers who applied for exemption to participate in the Games got leave to do so. They were: Larry Scally (flyweight), T. Byrne (bantamweight), Jack Kennedy (welterweight), and Jimmy Magill (middleweight). Magill, who won bronze, was in the RUC; as was William "Billy" Duncan, who won bronze at welterweight. Magill and Duncan's medals are credited to Northern Ireland. One (possibly incomplete) list of results of the boxing events does not list Scally, Byrne, or Kennedy.

The lawn bowls team was described as "Ireland" in reports of its selection, on the scoreboard, and in reports of its results. It was selected by the Irish Bowling Association, an all-island governing body, (Note: The Irish Free State Bowling League was a subsidiary of the Irish Bowling Association.) but the team members' clubs (Larne, Cavehill, and Shaftesbury) were all in Northern Ireland, the heartland of the sport in Ireland, and its results have retrospectively been credited to Northern Ireland.

== Later games ==
When the programme for the 1938 games in Sydney was unveiled in May 1936 by the British Empire Games Federation, the list of teams expected to be present included Northern Ireland but not Ireland (the new name for the Irish Free State under a new 1937 constitution). Liston and Maguire state, "CGF and other public records use different nomenclature for the 1938 [Ireland/Northern Ireland] team." In 1937, the Irish Free State Bowling League was invited, and said it would have liked to go but the cost of travel was prohibitive. The Irish state was not in fact represented at the Games, while Northern Ireland was. The Irish Bowling Association's team is variously described as "Ireland" and "Northern Ireland" in contemporary reports. The 1942 and 1946 games were cancelled, and when the Republic of Ireland Act 1948 came into force in 1949, Ireland was considered by Commonwealth states as having left the Commonwealth and ineligible for the 1950 games in Auckland, New Zealand. Northern Ireland was also absent, though it has participated at all subsequent games.

== See also ==
- Ireland at the Olympics
- Sport in Ireland
- Sport in Northern Ireland
