= Hong Kong at the Commonwealth Games =

- CG code: HKG
- CGA: Sports Federation and Olympic Committee of Hong Kong
- Website: hkolympic.org
- Medals: Gold 5 Silver 2 Bronze 9 Total 16

Commonwealth Games appearances (overview)
- 1934; 1938–1950; 1954; 1958; 1962; 1966; 1970; 1974; 1978; 1982; 1986; 1990; 1994

Hong Kong competed at the Commonwealth and British Empire Games as a British colony or dependent territory from 1934 to 1994. The abbreviation for Hong Kong was HKG. In 1997, the United Kingdom handed Hong Kong over to the People's Republic of China as a Special administrative region, meaning it could no longer participate, and started to take part in the National Games of China.

== Overall medal tally ==
After the last games attended by Hong Kong in 1994, Hong Kong had 17 medals, see All-time tally of medals.

== Medals ==
Hong Kong at the Commonwealth Games
Year	Gold (gold)	Silver (silver)	Bronze (bronze)	Total	Rank
1994	-	-	4	4	22
1990	1	1	3	5	15
1986	-	-	2	2	11
1982	1	-	-	1	14
1978	2	-	-	2	11
1974	-	-	-	-	/
1970	1	-	-	1	16
1962	-	-	-	-	/
1958	-	-	-	-	/
1954	-	1	-	1	14
1934	-	-	-	-	/

=== Gold Medals ===
- Men Bowls Fours – Abdul R. Kitchell, Clementi Delgado, George Angelo Souza, Robert E. da Silva 1970
- Men Bowls Fours – Kin Fun Phillip Chok, Majid Jr. Hassen, Omar Kachong Dallah, Robert E. da Silva 1978 Team Manager Jeffrey H Murphy
- Men Bowls Doubles – Clementi Delgado and Eric Liddell 1978 Team Manager Jeffrey H Murphy
- Men Rapid Fire Pistol – Solomon Lee 1982
- Mixed Doubles Badminton – Chan Chi Choi and Amy Chan 1990

=== Silver Medals ===
- Men Four Bowl – Alfred E. Coates, Jose A. da Luz, Raoul F. da Luz, Robert S. Gourlay 1954
- Men Single Bowl – Mark McMahon 1990

=== Bronze Medals ===
- Men 10m Air Pistol - Gilbert U 1986
- Men 50m Free Pistol – Ho Kar Fai 1986
- Men 50m Free Pistol – Gilbert U 1990
- Women Four Bowl – Jenny Wallis, Natividad Rozario, Sau Ling Chau, Yee Lai Lee 1990
- Mixed Team Badminton – Amy Chan, Chi Choi Chan, Kin Ngai Chan, Man Wa Chan, Mei Yin Chui, Pak Kum Ng, Siu Kwong Chan, Yick Kei Yeung, Yin Sat Cheng 1990
- Men Visually Impaired Singles Bowl – Carlos Braga Antunes 1994
- Women Visually Impaired Singles Bowl – Sunny Tang 1994
- Men Single Bowl – Ken Wallis 1994

=== Overall standings ===
	Gold	Silver	Bronze	Total
Hong Kong	5	2	10	17

== All-time Hong Kong Commonwealth Competitors ==
List of athletes who have competed for the Games for Hong Kong, but did not place in medal standings:

=== Archery ===
- Jimuel Lin

=== Fencing ===
- R. A. Da Costa – Men's Individual Foil and Individual Sabre
- Jose Marçal

=== Track ===
- Lee Tze-Fai – Men's 100m and 200m
- Yeung Sai Mo – Men's 500m and 1500m
- Yuko Gordon – Women's 3000m
- Lau Chi-keung – Men's 400m and 400m H

=== Badminton ===
- Man Hing Wong
- Sze Yu
- Chuen Wong
- Tin Cheung Chan
- Har Ping Wong
- Chun Mui Tong
- Selwyn Kwok
- Amy Chan
- Lap Chuen Wong
- Man Hing Wong

=== Boxing ===
- Kam Chan Boxing – Men's Bantamweight
- Choi Wing Boxing – Men's Flyweight Division (51 kg)
- Pok Wong Boxing – Men's Light Welterweight Division (63.5 kg)

=== Road Race (Cycling) ===
- Tat-Ming Chow Cycling – Men's Road Race (185 km)
- Yiu-Ming Fong Cycling – Men's Road Race (185 km)
- Chung-Yam Hung Cycling – Men's Road Race (185 km)

=== Diving ===
- Billy Yang Diving – Men's 3m Springboard Diving
- Andrew Tang Diving – Men's 3m Springboard Diving and Diving – Men's High Diving/Tower
- Amy Lam Diving – Women's 3m Springboard Diving

=== Shooting ===
- Peter Rull Shooting – Men's 50m Rifle Prone
- Dick Winney Shooting – Men's 50m Rifle Prone
- Janie Lee Shooting – Men's 50m/Free Pistol and Men's 50m/Free Pistol (Team)
- Peter Dawson Shooting – Men's Air Pistol
- Shu-Ming Cheng, Kevin Ngan Shooting – Men's Clay Pigeon Trap
- Chung-Kin Ho Shooting – Men's Rapid Fire Pistol
- Peter Hung Shooting – Men's Skeet
- Tsun-Man Chow Shooting – Men's Skeet

=== Swimming ===
- Yiu-Fai Leung – Men's 100m Backstroke
- Yuen Chung Swimming – Men's 100m Backstroke
- Lotta Flink – Women's 100m Backstroke, Women's 200m Backstroke, Women's 200m Individual Medley, Women's 4 × 100 m Freestyle Relay, Women's 4 × 100 m Medley Relay
- Kathryn Wong – Women's 100m Backstroke, Women's 100m Butterfly, Women's 200m Backstroke, Women's 200m Individual Medley, Women's 4 × 100 m Freestyle Relay, Women's 4 × 100 m Medley Relay
- Kam Shing Watt – Men's 100m Breaststroke and Swimming – Men's 200m Breaststroke
- Alex Tang Swimming – Men's 100m Breaststroke and Swimming – Men's 200m Breaststroke, Men's 4 × 100 m Medley Relay
- Lai Yee Chow Swimming – Women's 100m Breaststroke, Women's 200m Breaststroke, Women's 4 × 100 m Medley Relay
- Johnny Li – Men's 100m Butterfly, Men's 100m Freestyle, Men's 4 × 100 m Freestyle Relay, Men's 4 × 100 m Medley Relay, Men's 4 × 200 m Freestyle Relay
- Shiu Hang Chan – Men's 100m Butterfly, Men's 4 × 100 m Freestyle Relay, Men's 4 × 200 m Freestyle Relay
- Yi Ming Tsang Swimming – Men's 100m Butterfly, Men's 200m Butterfly, Men's 400m Freestyle, Men's 4 × 100 m Freestyle Relay, Men's 4 × 100 m Medley Relay, Men's 4 × 200 m Freestyle Relay, Men's 200m Freestyle
- Fenella Ng Swimming – Women's 100m Butterfly, Women's 200m Butterfly, Women's 400m Freestyle, Women's 800m Freestyle, Women's 4 × 100 m Freestyle Relay, Women's 4 × 100 m Medley Relay
- Che Hung Lau Swimming – Men's 100m Freestyle, Men's 200m Freestyle
- Yuen Chung – Men's 200m Backstroke, Men's 4 × 100 m Freestyle Relay, Men's 4 × 200 m Freestyle Relay
- Yiu Fai Leung Swimming – Men's 200m Backstroke, Men's 4 × 100 m Medley Relay
- Wai Lai – Swimming – Women's 4 × 100 m Freestyle Relay

== See also ==
- Hong Kong at the Olympics
- Hong Kong at the Asian Games
- Sports Federation and Olympic Committee of Hong Kong, China – formerly Sports Federation and Olympic Committee of Hong Kong
