= Trinidad and Tobago at the Commonwealth Games =

- CG code: TTO (TRI used at these Games)
- CGA: Trinidad and Tobago Olympic Committee
- Website: ttoc.org
- Medals Ranked 19th: Gold 13 Silver 26 Bronze 30 Total 69

Commonwealth Games appearances (overview)
- 1934; 1938; 1950; 1954; 1958; 1962; 1966; 1970; 1974; 1978; 1982; 1986; 1990; 1994; 1998; 2002; 2006; 2010; 2014; 2018; 2022; 2026; 2030

Trinidad and Tobago have competed at all but two Commonwealth Games since their debut in 1934. The only times they did not participate were in 1950 and 1986.

== Medals ==
Games	Gold	Silver	Bronze	Total
1934 London	0	0	0	0
1938 Sydney	0	0	0	0
1950 Auckland	did not attend			
1954 Vancouver	2	2	0	4
1958 Cardiff	0	0	2	2
1962 Perth	0	0	2	2
1966 Kingston	5	2	2	9
1970 Edinburgh	0	4	3	7
1974 Christchurch	0	1	1	2
1978 Edmonton	0	2	2	4
1982 Brisbane	0	0	0	0
1986 Edinburgh	did not attend			
1990 Auckland	0	0	0	0
1994 Victoria	0	0	2	2
1998 Kuala Lumpur	1	1	1	3
2002 Manchester	0	1	0	1
2006 Melbourne	0	0	3	3
2010 Delhi	0	4	2	6
2014 Glasgow	0	3	5	8
2018 Gold Coast	2	1	0	3
2022 Birmingham	3	2	1	6
2026 Glasgow	0	3	4	7
Total	13	26	30	69
