= Maldives at the Commonwealth Games =

- Flag of Maldives
- CGF code: MDV
- CGA: Maldives Olympic Committee
- Medals Ranked 0th: Gold 0 Silver 0 Bronze 0 Total 0

Commonwealth Games appearances (overview)
- 1986; 1990; 1994; 1998; 2002; 2006; 2010; 2014; 2018; 2022; 2026; 2030

The Maldives have competed in eight Commonwealth Games, beginning in 1986.

No athlete from the Maldives has won a medal at the Games.

In 2016 the Maldives left the Commonwealth.

On 1 February 2020, the Maldives returned to its status as a Commonwealth republic.
