= Zimbabwe at the Commonwealth Games =

- CGF code: ZIM
- CGA: Zimbabwe Olympic Committee
- Website: zoc.co.zw
- Medals: Gold 6 Silver 11 Bronze 19 Total 36

Commonwealth Games appearances (overview)
- 1934; 1938; 1950; 1954; 1958; 1962–1978; 1982; 1986; 1990; 1994; 1998; 2002

Other related appearances
- Rhodesia and Nyasaland (1962)

Zimbabwe (abbreviated ZIM) has competed in eleven Commonwealth Games starting from the second games in 1934: first as Southern Rhodesia, then as part of Rhodesia and Nyasaland, then as Zimbabwe. Rhodesia with a white-dominated government under UDI was suspended from 1966 to 1978.

Zimbabwe boycotted the games in 1986, along with 31 other nations, in protest of Britain's reluctance to sanction apartheid South Africa.

Zimbabwe withdrew from the Commonwealth in December 2003 and has not competed since.

== Medal tally ==
Year	Gold	Silver	Bronze	Total	Place	Title
2002	1	1	0	2	22nd	Zimbabwe
1998	2	0	3	5	14th	Zimbabwe
1994	0	3	3	6	19th	Zimbabwe
1990	0	2	1	3	22nd	Zimbabwe
1986					boycotted	
1982	1	0	0	1	14th	Zimbabwe
1978					did not attend	
1974					did not attend	
1970					did not attend	
1966					did not attend	
1962	0	2	5	7	12th	part of Rhodesia and Nyasaland
1958	0	0	2	2	19th	Southern Rhodesia
1954	2	2	1	5	7th	Southern Rhodesia
1950	0	1	0	1	12th	Southern Rhodesia
1938	0	0	2	2	10th	Southern Rhodesia
1934	0	0	2	2	11th	Southern Rhodesia
1930					did not attend	
Total	6	11	19	36	to 2002	
