= Gabon at the Commonwealth Games =

- Flag of Gabon
- CG code: GAB
- CGA: Gabonese Olympic Committee
- Website: www.cnog.ga
- Medals: Gold 0 Silver 0 Bronze 1 Total 1

Commonwealth Games appearances (overview)
- 2026; 2030

Gabon made its debut at the Commonwealth Games at the 2026 edition in Glasgow, Scotland. The country joined the Commonwealth of Nations in 2022.

== Medallists ==
The following Gabonese competitor have won medal at the Commonwealth Games.

Medal	Name	Sport	Event	Edition
Bronze	Marthe Gnacadja Avaro	Judo	Women's +78 kg	2026

== See also ==
- Gabon at the Olympics
