= Niue at the Commonwealth Games =

- CG code: NIU
- CGA: Niue Island Sports Association National Olympic Committee
- Website: oceaniasport.com/niue
- Medals Ranked 62ndth: Gold 0 Silver 0 Bronze 1 Total 1

Commonwealth Games appearances (overview)
- 2002; 2006; 2010; 2014; 2018; 2022; 2026; 2030

Niue has competed six times in the Commonwealth Games to date, in 2002, 2006, 2010, 2014, 2018, and 2022.

== Medal tally ==
	(gold)	(silver)	(bronze)	Total
Niue	0	0	1	1

Games	Gold	Silver	Bronze	Total
(England) 2002 Manchester	0	0	0	0
(Australia) 2006 Melbourne	0	0	0	0
(India) 2010 Delhi	0	0	0	0
(Scotland) 2014 Glasgow	0	0	0	0
(Australia) 2018 Gold Coast	0	0	0	0
(England) 2022 Birmingham	0	0	1	1
(Scotland) 2026 Glasgow	0	0	0	0
Totals (7 entries)	0	0	1	1

== History ==
Niue first participated at the Games in 2002 in Manchester, England with a team of athletes in Boxing, Athletics, Rugby Sevens and shooting.

== List of medalists ==
Medal	Name	Games	Sport	Event
(bronze) Bronze	Duken Tutakitoa-Williams	Birmingham 2022	Boxing	Men's heavyweight
