= Cameroon at the Commonwealth Games =

- CG code: CMR
- CGA: Cameroon Olympic and Sports Committee
- Website: cnosc.org (in French)
- Medals Ranked 19th: Gold 12 Silver 13 Bronze 20 Total 45

Commonwealth Games appearances (overview)
- 1998; 2002; 2006; 2010; 2014; 2018; 2022; 2026; 2030

Cameroon has competed at every Commonwealth Games since joining the Commonwealth in 1995. They have won 34 medals, including ten golds, 10 silvers and 14 bronze medals.

== Medals ==
Games	Gold	Silver	Bronze	Total
1998 Kuala Lumpur	0	3	3	6
2002 Manchester	9	1	2	12
2006 Melbourne	0	1	2	3
2010 Delhi	0	2	4	6
2014 Glasgow	1	3	3	7
2018 Gold Coast	0	1	2	3
2022 Birmingham	1	1	1	3
2026 Glasgow	1	1	3	5
Total	12	13	20	45
