= Bahamas at the Commonwealth Games =

- Flag of the Bahamas
- CG code: BAH
- CGA: Bahamas Olympic Committee
- Website: bahamasolympiccommittee.org
- Medals Ranked 21st: Gold 12 Silver 16 Bronze 13 Total 41

Commonwealth Games appearances (overview)
- 1954; 1958; 1962; 1966; 1970; 1974; 1978; 1982; 1986; 1990; 1994; 1998; 2002; 2006; 2010; 2014; 2018; 2022; 2026; 2030

The Bahamas have competed at fourteen Commonwealth Games, missing only two, 1974 and 1986, since their initial appearance in 1954. Athletes from The Bahamas have won thirtyfour medals at the Games, with all but four coming in Athletics.

== Medals ==
Games	Gold	Silver	Bronze	Total
1954 Vancouver	0	0	0	0
1958 Cardiff	1	1	0	2
1962 Perth	0	1	0	1
1966 Kingston	0	1	0	1
1970 Edinburgh	0	0	0	0
1974 Christchurch	did not attend			
1978 Edmonton	0	1	0	1
1982 Brisbane	2	2	2	6
1986 Edinburgh	did not attend			
1990 Auckland	0	0	2	2
1994 Victoria	0	0	0	0
1998 Kuala Lumpur	1	1	0	2
2002 Manchester	4	0	4	8
2006 Melbourne	0	2	0	2
2010 Delhi	1	1	4	6
2014 Glasgow	0	2	1	3
2018 Gold Coast	1	3	0	4
2022 Birmingham	1	1	0	2
2026 Glasgow	1	0	1	2
Total	12	16	14	42
