= Turks and Caicos Islands at the Commonwealth Games =

- Flag of the Turks and Caicos Islands
- CGF code: TCA (TCI used at these Games)
- CGA: Turks and Caicos Islands Commonwealth Games Association
- Medals Ranked 0th: Gold 0 Silver 0 Bronze 0 Total 0

Commonwealth Games appearances (overview)
- 1978; 1982–1994; 1998; 2002; 2006; 2010; 2014; 2018; 2022; 2026; 2030

The Turks and Caicos Islands have participated at six Commonwealth Games. Their first appearance came in 1978, but they did not appear again for twenty years. They have attended every Games since 1998. To date, no athlete from the Turks and Caicos has won a Commonwealth medal.
