= Ghana at the Commonwealth Games =

- CG code: GHA
- CGA: Ghana Olympic Committee
- Website: ghanaolympic.org
- Medals Ranked 18th: Gold 15 Silver 20 Bronze 28 Total 63

Commonwealth Games appearances (overview)
- 1954; 1958; 1962; 1966; 1970; 1974; 1978; 1982; 1986; 1990; 1994; 1998; 2002; 2006; 2010; 2014; 2018; 2022; 2026; 2030

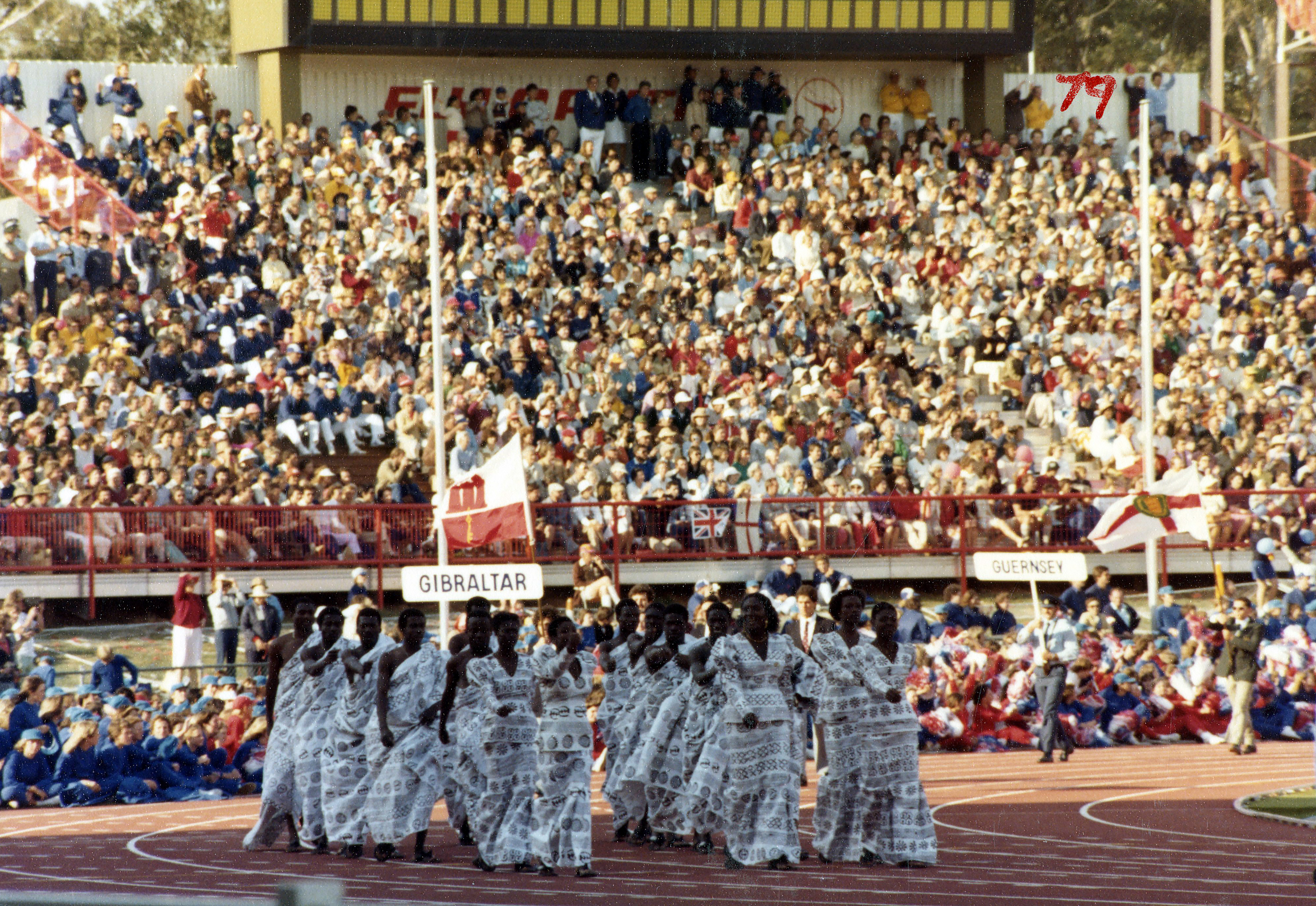
The Ghanaian team at the opening ceremony in Brisbane, 1982

Ghana have competed at seventeen Commonwealth Games, beginning in 1954 and missing only the 1986 Games in Edinburgh. Ghana have won sixty-three medals at the Commonwealth Games, including fifteen gold, with all but one of their medals coming in athletics and boxing.

== Medals ==
Games	Gold	Silver	Bronze	Total
1954 Vancouver	0	0	0	0
1958 Cardiff	0	0	1	1
1962 Perth	3	5	1	9
1966 Kingston	5	2	2	9
1970 Edinburgh	2	3	2	7
1974 Christchurch	1	3	5	9
1978 Edmonton	1	1	1	3
1982 Brisbane	0	0	0	0
1986 Edinburgh	did not attend			
1990 Auckland	0	2	0	2
1994 Victoria	0	0	2	2
1998 Kuala Lumpur	1	1	3	5
2002 Manchester	0	0	1	1
2006 Melbourne	2	0	1	3
2010 Delhi	0	1	3	4
2014 Glasgow	0	0	2	2
2018 Gold Coast	0	0	1	1
2022 Birmingham	0	2	3	5
Total	15	20	28	63
