= Jersey at the Commonwealth Games =

- CG code: JEY (JER used at these Games)
- CGA: Commonwealth Games Association of Jersey
- Website: cgaj.org
- Medals Ranked 45th: Gold 2 Silver 1 Bronze 3 Total 6

Commonwealth Games appearances (overview)
- 1958; 1962; 1966; 1970; 1974; 1978; 1982; 1986; 1990; 1994; 1998; 2002; 2006; 2010; 2014; 2018; 2022; 2026; 2030

Jersey has competed sixteen times in the Commonwealth Games to date, beginning in 1958.

== History ==
Jersey first participated at the Games in 1958 in Cardiff, Wales.

== Medal tally ==
	(gold)	(silver)	(bronze)	Total
Jersey	1	1	3	4

Games	Gold	Silver	Bronze	Total
1958 Cardiff	0	0	0	0
1962 Perth	0	0	1	1
1966 Kingston	0	0	0	0
1970 Edinburgh	0	0	0	0
1974 Christchurch	0	0	0	0
1978 Edmonton	0	0	0	0
1982 Brisbane	0	0	0	0
1986 Edinburgh	0	0	1	1
1990 Auckland	1	0	1	2
1994 Victoria	0	0	0	0
1998 Kuala Lumpur	0	0	0	0
2002 Manchester	0	0	0	0
2006 Melbourne	0	0	0	0
2010 Delhi	0	0	0	0
2014 Glasgow	0	0	0	0
2018 Gold Coast	0	0	0	0
2022 Birmingham	0	0	0	0
2026 Glasgow	1	1	0	2
Totals (18 entries)	2	1	3	6

Jersey was forty-fifth on the all-time medal tally of the Commonwealth Games after the 2014 games in Glasgow, Scotland, having won six medals since 1958, the last having been in 2026, when the swimmer Filip Nowacki won gold and silver.
