= Zambia at the Commonwealth Games =

- CG code: ZAM
- CGA: Commonwealth Games Association of Zambia
- Website: nocz.org
- Medals Ranked 26th: Gold 5 Silver 13 Bronze 25 Total 43

Commonwealth Games appearances (overview)
- 1954; 1958; 1962–1966; 1970; 1974; 1978; 1982; 1986; 1990; 1994; 1998; 2002; 2006; 2010; 2014; 2018; 2022; 2026; 2030

Other related appearances
- Rhodesia and Nyasaland (1962)

Zambia have competed in fourteen Commonwealth Games, though the first appearance was in 1954 as Northern Rhodesia. Northern Rhodesia competed as part of Rhodesia and Nyasaland in 1962.

The country competed for the first time as Zambia in the 1970 British Commonwealth Games, and has participated in every Games since except for the 1986 Games.

Zambia has won 39 Commonwealth Games medals, including nine medals won in the 1954 and 1958 Games as Northern Rhodesia.

== Medals ==
Games	Gold	Silver	Bronze	Total
1954 Vancouver^{a}	1	4	3	8
1958 Cardiff^{a}	0	0	1	1
1970 Edinburgh	0	2	2	4
1974 Christchurch	1	1	1	3
1978 Edmonton	0	2	2	4
1982 Brisbane	0	1	5	6
1990 Auckland	0	0	3	3
1994 Victoria	1	1	2	4
1998 Kuala Lumpur	0	0	1	1
2002 Manchester	1	1	2	4
2006 Melbourne	0	0	0	0
2010 Delhi	0	0	0	0
2014 Glasgow	0	0	2	2
2018 Gold Coast	0	0	0	0
2022 Birmingham	1	1	1	3
Totals (15 entries)	5	13	25	43

== Notes ==
- ^ Note a: Their participation was as Northern Rhodesia.
