= Gibraltar at the Commonwealth Games =

- CGF code: GIB
- CGA: Gibraltar Commonwealth Games Association
- Medals: Gold 0 Silver 0 Bronze 0 Total 0

Commonwealth Games appearances (overview)
- 1958; 1962; 1966; 1970; 1974; 1978; 1982; 1986; 1990; 1994; 1998; 2002; 2006; 2010; 2014; 2018; 2022; 2026; 2030

Team pin

Gibraltar has competed at seventeen Commonwealth Games, having attended every Games since 1958. Even so, no athlete representing Gibraltar has won a Commonwealth medal to date.

== See also ==
- Gibraltar at the European Championships
- Sport in Gibraltar
