= South Africa at the Commonwealth Games =

- CG code: RSA
- CGA: South African Sports Confederation and Olympic Committee
- Website: teamsa.co.za
- Medals Ranked 6th: Gold 137 Silver 133 Bronze 146 Total 416

Commonwealth Games appearances (overview)
- 1930; 1934; 1938; 1950; 1954; 1958; 1962–1990; 1994; 1998; 2002; 2006; 2010; 2014; 2018; 2022; 2026; 2030

South Africa has competed in all but eight of the 22 Commonwealth Games which have been held; from the original Games in 1930 to 1958, and then from 1994 onwards.

Because of South Africa's then apartheid policy, South Africa was sanctioned from the British Commonwealth in 1961, but was later re-admitted in 1994 following the end of apartheid.

As of 2022, South Africa ranks at number 6 on the all-time medal table with 137 gold, 132 silver and 147 bronze, respectively.

== Medal tally ==
Host country (South Africa)

Games	Gold	Silver	Bronze	Total
1930 Hamilton	6	4	8	18
1934 London	7	10	5	22
1938 Sydney	10	10	6	26
1950 Auckland	8	4	8	20
1954 Vancouver	16	6	13	35
1958 Cardiff	13	10	8	31
1994 Victoria	2	4	5	11
1998 Kuala Lumpur	9	11	13	33
2002 Manchester	9	20	16	45
2006 Melbourne	12	13	13	38
2010 Delhi	12	11	10	33
2014 Glasgow	13	10	17	40
2018 Gold Coast	13	11	13	37
2022 Birmingham	7	9	11	27
Totals (14 entries)	137	133	146	416

== See also ==
- South Africa at the 2006 Commonwealth Games
- Category:Commonwealth Games competitors for South Africa
