= Canada at the Commonwealth Games =

- CG code: CAN
- CGA: Commonwealth Sport Canada
- Website: commonwealthsport.ca
- Medals Ranked 3rd: Gold 532 Silver 569 Bronze 609 Total 1,710

Commonwealth Games appearances (overview)
- 1930; 1934; 1938; 1950; 1954; 1958; 1962; 1966; 1970; 1974; 1978; 1982; 1986; 1990; 1994; 1998; 2002; 2006; 2010; 2014; 2018; 2022; 2026; 2030

Other related appearances
- Newfoundland (1930, 1934)

Canada has participated in every Commonwealth Games since the first ever British Empire Games held in Hamilton, Ontario in 1930, one of only six countries to have done so. The others are Australia, England, New Zealand, Scotland, and Wales.

== History ==
Newfoundland competed separately at the 1930 and 1934 Games (although not winning any medals), but since 1950 has competed as part of Canada.

The Canadian team won 54 medals in the first (1930) Games, and 51 gold medals at Edinburgh (1986). Canada's biggest total medal tally was 129 medals in Victoria (1994).

Canada came third in the medal count at the 2006 Commonwealth Games in Melbourne after Australia and England, and is third on the all-time medal tally of Commonwealth Games, with an overall total of 1318 medals (413 Gold, 443 Silver and 462 Bronze). Canada was top of the medal tally once, at the 1978 games at Edmonton.

Canada has hosted the games four times. The first Games were at Hamilton, Ontario in 1930. Vancouver hosted the 1954 British Empire and Commonwealth Games notable for the famous "miracle mile" (four-minute mile) between Roger Bannister of England and John Landy of Australia at Empire Stadium. Edmonton was the first city to host the Commonwealth Games under that name in 1978, and Victoria, British Columbia hosted the Games in 1994.

Montreal was set to host the games in 1942 but they were cancelled due to the Second World War. Canada was offered to host them in 1950 but declined.

Hamilton applied to host the 2010 Commonwealth Games but lost to the Delhi bid. Halifax, Nova Scotia withdrew its bid for the 2014 Commonwealth Games.

The Commonwealth Games Association in Canada, known as Commonwealth Sport Canada (CSC) is responsible for organizing the Canadian team participating in the Commonwealth Games.

== Medals ==
Games	Gold	Silver	Bronze	Total	Rank
(Canada) 1930 Hamilton	20	17	17	54	2
(England) 1934 London	17	25	9	51	2
(Australia) 1938 Sydney	13	16	15	44	3
(New Zealand) 1950 Auckland	8	9	13	30	4
(Canada) 1954 Vancouver	9	20	14	42	4
(Wales) 1958 Cardiff	1	10	15	26	9
(Australia) 1962 Perth	4	12	15	31	5
(Jamaica) 1966 Kingston	14	20	23	57	3
(Scotland) 1970 Edinburgh	18	24	24	66	3
(New Zealand) 1974 Christchurch	25	19	18	62	3
(Canada) 1978 Edmonton	45	31	33	109	1
(Australia) 1982 Brisbane	26	23	33	82	3
(Scotland) 1986 Edinburgh	51	34	31	116	2
(New Zealand) 1990 Auckland	36	42	38	116	3
(Canada) 1994 Victoria	40	42	46	128	2
(Malaysia) 1998 Kuala Lumpur	30	31	38	99	3
(England) 2002 Manchester	31	41	43	115	3
(Australia) 2006 Melbourne	26	28	32	86	3
(India) 2010 Delhi	26	17	34	77	4
(Scotland) 2014 Glasgow	32	16	34	82	3
(Australia) 2018 Gold Coast	15	40	27	82	4
(England) 2022 Birmingham	26	32	34	92	3
(Scotland) 2026 Glasgow	19	20	23	62	3
Total	532	569	609	1710	3

== See also ==
Canadian medals by Game :

- Canada at the 1930 British Empire Games
- Canada at the 1950 British Empire Games
- Canada at the 1958 British Empire Games
- Canada at the 1982 Commonwealth Games
- Canada at the 2006 Commonwealth Games
