= Wales at the Commonwealth Games =

- CG code: WAL
- CGA: Commonwealth Games Wales
- Website: teamwales.cymru
- Medals Ranked 10th: Gold 75 Silver 104 Bronze 155 Total 334

Commonwealth Games appearances (overview)
- 1930; 1934; 1938; 1950; 1954; 1958; 1962; 1966; 1970; 1974; 1978; 1982; 1986; 1990; 1994; 1998; 2002; 2006; 2010; 2014; 2018; 2022; 2026; 2030

Wales is one of six countries to have competed in every Commonwealth Games since 1930, the others being Australia, Canada, England, New Zealand and Scotland. At the Commonwealth Games, Wales takes part as a separate entity, as in the Six Nations Rugby Championship, Rugby World Cup and international association football competitions. In other events, such as the Olympic Games, they compete under the banner of the United Kingdom.

Commonwealth Games Wales (Welsh: Gemau'r Gymanwlad Cymru; formerly the Commonwealth Games Council for Wales), manages the team's entry to the games and supports Welsh athletes in their participation.

Wales has hosted one Commonwealth Games to date, the 1958 British Empire and Commonwealth Games in Cardiff.

== Overall medals tally ==
After the 2014 Commonwealth Games, Wales was tenth in the All-time tally of medals, with an overall total of 270 medals (57 gold, 86 silver and 127 bronze).

The most gold medals that Wales have won in a Commonwealth Games is 10, at the 1990 Commonwealth Games in Auckland. The largest medal haul was at the 2014 Commonwealth Games in Glasgow, at which Wales won 36 medals including five gold. Both records were equalled at the 2018 Commonwealth Games.

Sport	Gold	Silver	Bronze	Total
2018 Gold Coast	10	12	14	36
1990 Auckland	10	3	12	25
2022 Birmingham	8	6	14	28
2002 Manchester	6	13	12	31
1986 Edinburgh	6	5	11	22
2014 Glasgow	5	11	20	36
1994 Victoria	5	8	6	19
1982 Brisbane	4	4	1	9
2010 Delhi	3	6	10	19
2006 Melbourne	3	5	11	19
1998 Kuala Lumpur	3	4	9	16
1966 Kingston	3	2	2	7
1970 Edinburgh	2	6	4	12
1978 Edmonton	2	1	5	8
1938 Sydney	2	1	0	3
1974 Christchurch	1	5	4	10
1958 Cardiff	1	3	7	11
1954 Vancouver	1	1	5	7
1934 London	0	3	3	6
1962 Perth	0	2	4	6
1930 Hamilton	0	2	1	3
1950 Auckland	0	1	0	1
Totals (22 entries)	75	104	155	334

== Flag and victory anthem ==
Team Wales uses the Welsh national flag, Y Ddraig Goch, at the Commonwealth Games. This flag is common for all sporting teams that represent Wales as an entity distinct from the United Kingdom.

The Welsh national anthem Hen Wlad Fy Nhadau ("Land of My Fathers") is used as the Welsh victory anthem at the Commonwealth games.
