= List of Commonwealth Sport country codes =

The Commonwealth Sport organization (formerly the Commonwealth Games Federation (CGF)) uses three-letter abbreviation country codes to refer to each group of athletes that participate in both the Commonwealth Games and the Commonwealth Youth Games. Each code identifies a Commonwealth Games Association.

Several of the CGF codes are different from the standard ISO 3166-1 alpha-3 codes. Other sporting organisations, such as the International Olympic Committee or FIFA, use similar country codes to refer to their respective teams.

== Current CGAs ==
There are 74 current CGAs that participate at the Commonwealth Games. The following tables show the currently used code for each CGA and any different codes used in past Games. Some of the past code usage is further explained in the following sections.

=== A ===
Code	Nation (CGA)	Other codes used
AIA	Anguilla	ANG (1998–2010)
ANT	Antigua and Barbuda	
AUS	Australia	

=== B ===
Code	Nation (CGA)	Other codes used
BAH	Bahamas	
BAN	Bangladesh	
BAR	Barbados	
BER	Bermuda	
BIZ	Belize	HBR (1962–1966)
BOT	Botswana	
BRU	Brunei	

=== C ===
Code	Nation (CGA)	Other codes used
CAN	Canada	
CAY	Cayman Islands	
CMR	Cameroon	
COK	Cook Islands	
CYP	Cyprus	

=== D ===
Code	Nation (CGA)	Other codes used
DMA	Dominica	

=== E ===
Code	Nation (CGA)	Other codes used
ENG	England	GB

=== F ===
Code	Nation (CGA)	Other codes used
FLK	Falkland Islands	FAI (1982–2010)
FIJ	Fiji^{1}	

=== G ===
Code	Nation (CGA)	Other codes used
GAB	Gabon	
GAM	The Gambia	
GGY	Guernsey	GUE (1970–2010)
GHA	Ghana	GCO (1954)
GIB	Gibraltar	
GRN	Grenada	
GUY	Guyana	BGU (1930–1962)

=== I ===
Code	Nation (CGA)	Other codes used
IND	India	
IOM	Isle of Man	
IVB	British Virgin Islands	

=== J ===
Code	Nation (CGA)	Other codes used
JAM	Jamaica	
JEY	Jersey	JER (1958–2010)

=== K ===
Code	Nation (CGA)	Other codes used
KEN	Kenya	
KIR	Kiribati	KRI (2002)

=== L ===
Code	Nation (CGA)	Other codes used
LCA	Saint Lucia	
LES	Lesotho	

=== M ===
Code	Nation (CGA)	Other codes used
MAS	Malaysia	MAL (1950–1962), as Malaya
MAW	Malawi	
MDV	Maldives	
MLT	Malta	
MOZ	Mozambique	
MRI	Mauritius	
MSR	Montserrat	MNT (1994–2010)

=== N ===
Code	Nation (CGA)	Other codes used
NAM	Namibia	
NFK	Norfolk Island	NFI (1986–2010)
NGR	Nigeria	
NIR	Northern Ireland	
NIU	Niue	
NRU	Nauru	
NZL	New Zealand	

=== P ===
Code	Nation (CGA)	Other codes used
PAK	Pakistan	
PNG	Papua New Guinea	

=== R ===
Code	Nation (CGA)	Other codes used
RSA	South Africa	SAF (1930–1958)
RWA	Rwanda	

=== S ===
Code	Nation (CGA)	Other codes used
SAM	Samoa	
SCO	Scotland	
SEY	Seychelles	
SHN	Saint Helena	SHE (2006)
SGP	Singapore	SIN (1965–2016)
SKN	Saint Kitts and Nevis	SCN (1978)
SLE	Sierra Leone	
SOL	Solomon Islands	
SRI	Sri Lanka	CEY (1938–1970)
SVG	Saint Vincent and the Grenadines	
SWZ	Swaziland (now Eswatini)	

=== T ===
Code	Nation (CGA)	Other codes used
TAN	Tanzania	
TCA	Turks and Caicos Islands	TCI (1978–2010)
TOG	Togo	
TGA	Tonga	TON (1974–2010)
TTO	Trinidad and Tobago	TRI (1934–2010)
TUV	Tuvalu	

=== U ===
Code	Nation (CGA)	Other codes used
UGA	Uganda	

=== V ===
Code	Nation (CGA)	Other codes used
VAN	Vanuatu	

=== W ===
Code	Nation (CGA)	Other codes used
WAL	Wales	

=== Z ===
Code	Nation (CGA)	Other codes used
ZAM	Zambia	NRH (1954)

== Historic CGAs and teams ==
=== Codes still in use ===
Code	Nation/Team	Other codes used
FSA	Federation of South Arabia^{2}	
HKG	Hong Kong^{3}	
IFS	Irish Free State^{4}	
IRE	Ireland	
ZIM	Zimbabwe^{5}	SRH (1934–1958) and ZIM (1982–2002)

=== Obsolete codes ===
Code	Nation (CGA)	Years	Notes
ADN	Aden	1962	Competed independently prior to the formation Federation of South Arabia
BGU	British Guiana	1930–1962	Now Guyana
CEY	Ceylon	1938–1970	Now Sri Lanka
FRN	Rhodesia and Nyasaland	1962	Now Malawi, Zambia and Zimbabwe
GCO	Gold Coast	1954	Now Ghana
HBR	British Honduras	1962–1966	Now Belize
MAL	Malaysia	1950–1962	Competed independently prior to the formation of Malaysia in 1963. Now Malaysia
BNB	British North Borneo	1958–1962	Competed independently prior to the formation of Malaysia in 1963. Now Malaysia
SAR	Sarawak	1958–1962	Competed independently prior to the formation of Malaysia in 1963. Now Malaysia
NEW	Newfoundland	1930–1934	Competed independently prior becoming a province of Canada
NRH	Northern Rhodesia	1954	Now Zambia
SAF	South Africa	1930–1958	Now South Africa
SCN	Saint Christopher-Nevis-Anguilla	1978	Now Saint Kitts and Nevis and Anguilla
SRH	Southern Rhodesia	1934–1958	Now Zimbabwe
TAG	Tanganyika	1962	Competed independently prior to the formation of Tanzania in 1964. Now Tanzania

== Notes ==
^1 Suspended from the Commonwealth on 8 December 2006 over the 2006 Fijian coup d'état. Reinstated March 2014.
^2 Left the Commonwealth on 30 November 1967 when it formed part of South Yemen.
^3 Left the Commonwealth on 1 July 1997 when China resumed sovereignty.
^4 Ceased to exist upon the enactment of the Constitution of Ireland on 29 December 1937.
^5 Suspended from the Commonwealth on 19 March 2002. Withdrew voluntarily on 7 December 2003.

== See also ==
- List of IOC country codes
- List of FIFA country codes
