= List of flag bearers for Seychelles at the Olympics =

Seychelles at the Olympics
- Flag of Seychelles
- IOC code: SEY
- NOC: Seychelles Olympic and Commonwealth Games Association
- Medals: Gold 0 Silver 0 Bronze 0 Total 0

Summer appearances
- 1980; 1984; 1988; 1992; 1996; 2000; 2004; 2008; 2012; 2016; 2020; 2024

This is a list of flag bearers who have represented Seychelles at the Olympics.

Flag bearers carry the national flag of their country at the opening ceremony of the Olympic Games.

#	Event year	Season	Flag bearer	Sport
1	1980	Summer	Michael Pillay	Boxing
2	1984	Summer	Denis Rose	Athletics
3	1992	Summer	Roland Raforme	Boxing
4	1996	Summer	Rival Cadeau	Boxing
5	2000	Summer	Benjamin Lo-Pinto	Swimming
6	2004	Summer	Allan Julie	Sailing
7	2008	Summer	Georgie Cupidon	Badminton
8	2012	Summer	Dominic Dugasse	Judo
9	2016	Summer	Rodney Govinden	Sailing
10	2020	Summer	Rodney Govinden	Sailing
10	2020	Summer	Felicity Passon	Swimming
11	2024	Summer	Khema Elizabeth	Swimming
11	2024	Summer	Dylan Sicobo	Athletics

== See also ==
- Seychelles at the Olympics
