= Seychelles at the 1980 Summer Olympics =

- Flag of Seychelles
- IOC code: SEY
- NOC: Seychelles Olympic and Commonwealth Games Association

in Moscow, Soviet Union July 19 – August 3, 1980
- Competitors: 11 in 2 sports
- Flag bearer: Michael Pillay
- Medals: Gold 0 Silver 0 Bronze 0 Total 0

Summer Olympics appearances (overview)
- 1980; 1984; 1988; 1992; 1996; 2000; 2004; 2008; 2012; 2016; 2020; 2024

Seychelles competed in the Olympic Games for the first time at the 1980 Summer Olympics in Moscow, USSR.

== Athletics ==
Nine athletes represented Seychelles in 1980.

Men's 100 metres

- Marc Larose

- Heat — 10.62 (→ did not advance)

Men's 200 metres

- Casimir Pereira

- Heat — 21.29 (→ next round)

Men's 400 metres

- Régis Tranquille

- Heat — 49.34 (→ did not advance)

Men's Marathon

- Albert Marie

- Final — did not finish (→ no ranking)

Men's 110 m Hurdles

- Antonio Gopal

- Heat — 16.36 (→ did not advance)

Men's 3,000 m Steeplechase

- Albert Marie

- Heat — 9:19.7 (→ did not advance)

Men's 4 × 100 metres Relay

- Marc La Rose, Regis Tranquille, Casimir Pereira and Vincent Confait

- Heat — 41.71 (→ did not advance)

Men's 4 × 400 metres Relay

- Vincent Confait, Regis Tranquille, Marc La Rose and Casimir Pereira

- Heat — 3:19.2 (→ did not advance)

Men's Triple Jump

- Arthure Agathine

- Qualification — 14.21 m (→ did not advance, 20th place out of 23)

Women's 100 metres

- Bessey de Létourdie

- Heat — 13.04 (→ did not advance)

Women's 200 metres

- Bessey de Létourdie

- Heat — 26.91 (→ did not advance)

Women's 800 metres

- Margaret Morel

- Heat — 2:17.0 (→ did not advance)

Women's 1,500 metres

- Margaret Morel

- Heat — 4:37.9 (→ did not advance)

== Boxing ==
Two boxers represented Seychelles in 1980.

Men's Featherweight (57 kg)

- Ramy Zialor
  1. First Round — Bye
  2. Second Round — Lost to Leoul Neeraio (Ethiopia) on points (2-3)

Men's Welterweight (67 kg)

- Michael Pillay
  1. First Round — Defeated Ole Svendsen (Denmark) on points (4-1)
  2. Second Round — Lost to Mehmet Bogujevci (Yugoslavia) on knock-out in first round
