= Seychelles at the 2000 Summer Olympics =

- Flag of Seychelles
- IOC code: SEY
- NOC: Seychelles Olympic and Commonwealth Games Association

in Sydney
- Competitors: 9 in 5 sports
- Flag bearer: Benjamin Lo-Pinto
- Medals: Gold 0 Silver 0 Bronze 0 Total 0

Summer Olympics appearances (overview)
- 1980; 1984; 1988; 1992; 1996; 2000; 2004; 2008; 2012; 2016; 2020; 2024

Seychelles competed at the 2000 Summer Olympics in Sydney, Australia.

== Competitors ==
The following is the list of number of competitors in the Games.

Sport	Men	Women	Total
Athletics	1	1	2
Judo	1	0	1
Sailing	2	1	3
Swimming	2	0	2
Weightlifting	0	1	1
Total	6	3	9

== Athletics ==
Men

Athlete	Event	Heat		Quarterfinal		Semifinal		Final	
Athlete	Event	Result	Rank	Result	Rank	Result	Rank	Result	Rank
Nelson Lucas	100 m	11.15	9	did not advance					

Women

Athlete	Event	Heat		Quarterfinal		Semifinal		Final	
Athlete	Event	Result	Rank	Result	Rank	Result	Rank	Result	Rank
Joanna Hoareau	100 m	12.01	6	did not advance					

== Judo ==
Men

Athlete	Event	Round of 32	Round of 16	Quarterfinals	Semifinals	Repechage 1	Repechage 2	Repechage 3	Final / BM	
Athlete	Event	Opposition Result	Opposition Result	Opposition Result	Opposition Result	Opposition Result	Opposition Result	Opposition Result	Opposition Result	Rank
Francis Labrosse	−60 kg	Mukhtarov (UZB); L	did not advance			Rebahi (ALG); L	did not advance			

== Sailing ==
Two men and one woman represented Seychelles in the sailing competition.

Men

Athlete	Event	Race											Net points	Final rank
Athlete	Event	1	2	3	4	5	6	7	8	9	10	11	Net points	Final rank
Jonathan Barbe	Mistral	31	33	31	33	35	~~37~~; ~~DNC~~	33	33	~~37~~; ~~DNC~~	29	34	292	35

Women

Athlete	Event	Race											Net points	Final rank
Athlete	Event	1	2	3	4	5	6	7	8	9	10	11	Net points	Final rank
Endra Ha-Tiff	Mistral	27	29	29	29	~~30~~; ~~DSQ~~	26	29	29	29	29	28	255	29

Open

Athlete	Event	Race											Net points	Final rank
Athlete	Event	1	2	3	4	5	6	7	8	9	10	11	Net points	Final rank
Allan Julie	Laser	19	21	~~44~~; ~~DSQ~~	31	14	26	38	10	22	28	32	203	28

== Swimming ==
Two men represented Seychelles in the swimming competition.

Athlete	Events	Heat		Semifinal		Final	
Athlete	Events	Time	Rank	Time	Rank	Time	Rank
Kenny Roberts	100 m freestyle	53.4	61	did not advance			
Benjamin Lo-Pinto	100 m backstroke	58.9	47	did not advance			

== Weightlifting ==
One woman represented Seychelles in the weightlifting competition.

Athlete	Event	Snatch		Clean & jerk		Total	Rank
Athlete	Event	Result	Rank	Result	Rank	Total	Rank
Sophia Vandagne	Women's −58 kg	72.5	15	87.5	13	160	13

== Sources ==
- Wallechinsky, David (2004). The Complete Book of the Summer Olympics (Athens 2004 Edition). Toronto, Canada. ISBN 1-894963-32-6.
- International Olympic Committee (2001). The Results. Retrieved 12 November 2005.
- Sydney Organising Committee for the Olympic Games (2001). Official Report of the XXVII Olympiad Volume 1: Preparing for the Games. Retrieved 20 November 2005.
- Sydney Organising Committee for the Olympic Games (2001). Official Report of the XXVII Olympiad Volume 2: Celebrating the Games. Retrieved 20 November 2005.
- Sydney Organising Committee for the Olympic Games (2001). The Results. Retrieved 20 November 2005.
- International Olympic Committee Web Site
