= Seychelles at the 2016 Summer Olympics =

- Flag of Seychelles
- IOC code: SEY
- NOC: Seychelles Olympic and Commonwealth Games Association

in Rio de Janeiro
- Competitors: 10 in 6 sports
- Flag bearer: Rodney Govinden
- Medals: Gold 0 Silver 0 Bronze 0 Total 0

Summer Olympics appearances (overview)
- 1980; 1984; 1988; 1992; 1996; 2000; 2004; 2008; 2012; 2016; 2020; 2024

Seychelles competed at the 2016 Summer Olympics in Rio de Janeiro, Brazil, from 5 to 21 August 2016. This was the nation's eighth appearance at the Summer Olympics, with the exception of the 1988 Summer Olympics in Seoul because of its partial support to the North Korean boycott.

The Seychelles Olympic and Commonwealth Games Association (SOCGA) sent the nation's largest delegation to the Games since 1992. A total of ten athletes, eight men and two women, were selected to the Seychellois squad across six sports (athletics, boxing, judo, sailing, swimming, and weightlifting).

Finn yachtsman Allan Julie etching his name into the history records as the oldest participant (aged 39) of the Seychellois squad and the first to compete in five Olympic Games. Apart from Julie, three other athletes were returning Olympians; all of them participated in their second Games, including high jumper Lissa Labiche, lightweight boxer Andrique Allisop, and half-heavyweight judoka Dominic Dugasse (men's 100 kg). Six Seychellois athletes made their Olympic debut in Rio de Janeiro, with Laser sailor Rodney Govinden acting as the nation's flag bearer in the opening ceremony. The Seychelles, however, has yet to win its first Olympic medal.

== Athletics ==
Seychelles received universality slots from IAAF to send two athletes (one male and one female) to the Olympics.

Key

- Note–Ranks given for track events are within the athlete's heat only
- Q = Qualified for the next round
- q = Qualified for the next round as a fastest loser or, in field events, by position without achieving the qualifying target
- NR = National record
- N/A = Round not applicable for the event
- Bye = Athlete not required to compete in round

Track & road events

Athlete	Event	Heat		Semifinal		Final	
Athlete	Event	Result	Rank	Result	Rank	Result	Rank
Ned Azemia	Men's 400 m hurdles	50.74 NR	8	did not advance			

Field events

Athlete	Event	Qualification		Final	
Athlete	Event	Distance	Position	Distance	Position
Lissa Labiche	Women's high jump	1.85	=29	did not advance	

== Boxing ==
Seychelles entered one boxer who competed in the men's lightweight division into the Olympic boxing tournament. 2012 Olympian Andrique Allisop had claimed his Olympic spot with a box-off victory at the 2016 African Qualification Tournament in Yaoundé, Cameroon.

Athlete	Event	Round of 32	Round of 16	Quarterfinals	Semifinals	Final	
Athlete	Event	Opposition Result	Opposition Result	Opposition Result	Opposition Result	Opposition Result	Rank
Andrique Allisop	Men's lightweight	Joyce (IRL); L 0–3	did not advance				

== Judo ==
Seychelles qualified one judoka for the men's half-heavyweight category (100 kg) at the Games. London 2012 Olympian Dominic Dugasse earned a continental quota spot from the African region, as Seychelles' top-ranked judoka outside of direct qualifying position in the IJF World Ranking List of May 30, 2016.

Athlete	Event	Round of 64	Round of 32	Round of 16	Quarterfinals	Semifinals	Repechage	Final / BM	
Athlete	Event	Opposition Result	Opposition Result	Opposition Result	Opposition Result	Opposition Result	Opposition Result	Opposition Result	Rank
Dominic Dugasse	Men's −100 kg	Bye	Darwish (EGY); L 000–100	did not advance					

== Sailing ==
Seychellois sailors qualified one boat in each of the following classes through the individual fleet World Championships, and African qualifying regattas.

Athlete	Event	Race													Net points	Final rank
Athlete	Event	1	2	3	4	5	6	7	8	9	10	11	12	M*	Net points	Final rank
Jean-Marc Gardette	Men's RS:X	36	35	33	31	23	31	29	~~DNF~~	35	DNF	32	33	EL	355	33
Rodney Govinden	Men's Laser	45	41	~~47~~	37	43	37	41	41	43	38	—		EL	365	45
Allan Julie	Men's Finn	~~23~~	17	23	21	17	18	23	23	22	23	—		EL	197	23

M = Medal race; EL = Eliminated – did not advance into the medal race

== Swimming ==
Seychelles received a Universality invitation from FINA to send two swimmers (one male and one female) to the Olympics.

Athlete	Event	Heat		Semifinal		Final	
Athlete	Event	Time	Rank	Time	Rank	Time	Rank
Adam Viktora	Men's 50 m freestyle	24.32	56	did not advance			
Alexus Laird	Women's 100 m backstroke	1:03.33	27	did not advance			

== Weightlifting ==
Seychelles received an invitation from the Tripartite Commission to send Rick Confiance in the men's featherweight category (62 kg) to the Olympics, which signified the nation's Olympic return to the sport after an eight-year hiatus.

Athlete	Event	Snatch		Clean & Jerk		Total	Rank
Athlete	Event	Result	Rank	Result	Rank	Total	Rank
Rick Yves Confiance	Men's −62 kg	105	14	127	13	232	13
