= Seychelles at the 1996 Summer Olympics =

- Flag of Seychelles
- IOC code: SEY
- NOC: Seychelles Olympic and Commonwealth Games Association

in Atlanta
- Competitors: 9 in 5 sports
- Flag bearer: Rival Cadeau
- Medals: Gold 0 Silver 0 Bronze 0 Total 0

Summer Olympics appearances (overview)
- 1980; 1984; 1988; 1992; 1996; 2000; 2004; 2008; 2012; 2016; 2020; 2024

Seychelles competed at the 1996 Summer Olympics in Atlanta, United States. Seychelles failed to win its first olympic medal

== Competitors ==
The following is the list of number of competitors in the Games.

Sport	Men	Women	Total
Athletics	1	1	2
Boxing	3	–	3
Sailing	2	0	2
Swimming	1	0	1
Weightlifting	1	–	1
Total	8	1	9

== Athletics ==
=== Men ===
Athlete	Event	Qualification		Final	
Athlete	Event	Result	Rank	Result	Rank
Paul Nioze	Triple jump	15.63	39	Did not advance	

=== Women ===
Athlete	Event	Qualification		Final	
Athlete	Event	Result	Rank	Result	Rank
Beryl Laramé	Long jump	3.88	37	Did not advance	

== Boxing ==
Athlete	Event	Round of 32	Round of 16	Quarterfinal	Semifinal	Final
Athlete	Event	Opposition Result	Opposition Result	Opposition Result	Opposition Result	Opposition Result
Gerry Legras	Light-welterweight	Esalas (COL); W 26-12	Moghimi (IRI); L 16-7	Did not advance		
Rival Cadeau	Light-middleweight	Silva (BRA); W 22-7	Aryee (GHA); W 18-6	Tulyaganov (UZB); L RSC	Did not advance	
Roland Raforme	Light-heavyweight	Amos-Ross (CAN); L KO	Did not advance			

== Sailing ==
Men

Athlete	Event	Race											Score	Rank
Athlete	Event	1	2	3	4	5	6	7	8	9	10	11	Score	Rank
Jonathan Barbe	Mistral	(43)	42	41	36	40	41	36	42	(44)	CAN	CAN	278	44

Mixed

Athlete	Event	Race											Score	Rank
Athlete	Event	1	2	3	4	5	6	7	8	9	10	11	Score	Rank
Allan Julie	Laser	YMP	36	27	(57)	38	44	(47)	42	34	35	27	305	38

== Swimming ==
Athletes	Events	Heat		Finals	
Athletes	Events	Time	Rank	Time	Rank
Kenny Roberts	100 m freestyle	52.89	52	Did not advance	

== Weightlifting ==
Athletes	Events	Snatch		Clean & jerk		Total	Rank
Athletes	Events	Result	Rank	Result	Rank	Total	Rank
Steven Baccus	-83 kg	115.0	=18	145.0	18	260.0	18
