= Swimming at the 2026 Commonwealth Games – Women's 100 metre backstroke =

Women's 100 metre backstroke at the 2026 Commonwealth Games
- Venue: Tollcross International Swimming Centre
- Dates: 25 July (heats, semifinals); 26 July (final)
- Winning time: 58.71

Medalists
gold medal	Iona Anderson	Australia
silver medal	Kylie Masse	Canada
bronze medal	Olivia Nel	South Africa

The women's 100 metre backstroke event at the 2026 Commonwealth Games was held on 25 and 26 July at the Tollcross International Swimming Centre.

== Schedule ==
The schedule is as follows:

All times are British Summer Time (UTC+1)

Date	Time	Round
Saturday 25 July 2026	10:30	Heats
Saturday 25 July 2026	19:00	Semifinals
Sunday 26 July 2026	19:00	Final

== Results ==
=== Heats ===
The heats was held on the morning of 25 July 2026.

Heat results
Rank	Heat	Lane	Swimmer	Nation	Time	Notes
1	5	4	Iona Anderson	Australia	59.86	Q
2	3	4	Kylie Masse	Canada	59.90	Q
3	4	4	Hannah Fredericks	Australia	1:00.18	Q
4	5	3	Olivia Nel	South Africa	1:00.59	Q
5	4	5	Katie Shanahan	Scotland	1:00.99	Q
6	5	5	Lauren Cox	England	1:01.12	Q
7	3	3	Grace Davison	Northern Ireland	1:01.21	Q
8	4	6	Danielle Hill	Northern Ireland	1:01.28	Q
9	3	5	Amber George	New Zealand	1:01.46	Q
10	4	3	Lottie Cullen	Northern Ireland	1:01.47	Q
11	3	2	Jessica Thompson	South Africa	1:01.54	Q
12	5	2	Savannah-Eve Martin	New Zealand	1:01.74	Q
13	4	1	J.O.T. Humphrey	Namibia	1:01.83	Q
14	3	6	Madison Kryger	Canada	1:02.19	Q
15	5	7	Bex Sutton	Wales	1:02.23	Q
16	5	6	Holly McGill	Scotland	1:02.35	Q
17	4	2	Delia Lloyd	Canada	1:02.44	R
18	5	1	Ella Justice	Isle of Man	1:02.83	R
19	3	7	Hannah Pearse	South Africa	1:03.23	
20	5	8	Halle Harris	Sierra Leone	1:04.13	
21	3	1	Tatiana Tostevin	Guernsey	1:04.30	
22	3	8	Sierrah Broadbelt	Cayman Islands	1:04.92	
23	2	4	Megan Hansford	Jersey	1:05.48	
24	2	6	Nafanua Hamilton	Samoa	1:05.57	
25	2	3	Yalindi Rupesinghe	Sri Lanka	1:06.52	
26	4	8	Anishta Teeluck	Mauritius	1:06.61	
27	1	5	Aaliyah Palestrini	Seychelles	1:06.67	
28	2	5	Elizabeth Curphey	Isle of Man	1:07.13	
29	2	2	Mia Laban	Cook Islands	1:07.28	
30	1	4	Sharmeen Mohammad Mharvin	Brunei	1:07.80	
31	2	7	Riley Watson	Cayman Islands	1:08.41	
32	2	1	Tallulah-Mae Rautenbach	Guernsey	1:08.64	
33	2	8	Angelina Smythe	Seychelles	1:08.80	
34	1	6	Joanna Chen	Papua New Guinea	1:12.39	
35	1	3	Katie Maddocks	Gibraltar	1:13.63	
-	4	7	Emma Harvey	Bermuda	DNS	

=== Semifinals ===
The semifinals took place during of the evening of 25 July 2026.

Semifinals results
Rank	Heat	Lane	Swimmer	Nation	Time	Notes
1	1	4	Kylie Masse	Canada	59.71	Q
3	2	5	Iona Anderson	Australia	1:00.11	Q
3	2	4	Hannah Fredericks	Australia	1:00.18	Q
4	1	3	Lauren Cox	England	1:00.39	Q
5	1	5	Olivia Nel	South Africa	1:00.48	Q
6	2	1	Madison Kryger	Canada	1:00.51	Q
7	2	3	Katie Shanahan	Scotland	1:00.74	Q
8	1	2	Lottie Cullen	Northern Ireland	1:00.82	Q
9	1	6	Danielle Hill	Northern Ireland	1:00.83	
10	2	6	Grace Davison	Northern Ireland	1:01.20	
11	2	2	Amber George	New Zealand	1:01.24	
12	2	7	Savannah-Eve Martin	New Zealand	1:01.35	
13	1	1	Holly McGill	Scotland	1:02.16	
14	1	7	J.O.T. Humphrey	Namibia	1:02.34	
15	2	8	Delia Lloyd	Canada	1:03.22	
16	1	8	Ella Justice	Isle of Man	1:03.47	

=== Final ===
The final took place during of the evening of 26 July 2026.

Final results
Rank	Lane	Swimmer	Nation	Time	Notes
1st place, gold medalist(s)	3	Iona Anderson	Australia	58.71	
2nd place, silver medalist(s)	4	Kylie Masse	Canada	58.77	
3rd place, bronze medalist(s)	2	Olivia Nel	South Africa	1:00.09	
4	5	Hannah Fredericks	Australia	1:00.17	
5	6	Lauren Cox	England	1:00.35	
6	1	Katie Shanahan	Scotland	1:00.88	
7	7	Madison Kryger	Canada	1:00.92	
8	8	Lottie Cullen	Northern Ireland	1:01.61	
