= Seychelles at the 1992 Summer Olympics =

- Flag of Seychelles
- IOC code: SEY
- NOC: Seychelles Olympic and Commonwealth Games Association

in Barcelona, Spain 25 July–9 August 1992
- Competitors: 11 (10 men, 1 woman) in 4 sports
- Flag bearer: Roland Raforme
- Medals: Gold 0 Silver 0 Bronze 0 Total 0

Summer Olympics appearances (overview)
- 1980; 1984; 1988; 1992; 1996; 2000; 2004; 2008; 2012; 2016; 2020; 2024

Seychelles was represented at the 1992 Summer Olympics in Barcelona, Catalonia, Spain by the Seychelles Olympic and Commonwealth Games Association.

In total, 11 athletes including 10 men and one woman represented Seychelles in four different sports including athletics, boxing, sailing and swimming.

== Competitors ==
In total, 11 athletes represented Seychelles at the 1992 Summer Olympics in Barcelona, Catalonia, Spain across four different sports.

Sport	Men	Women	Total
Athletics	4	0	4
Boxing	2	–	2
Sailing	1	0	1
Swimming	3	1	4
Total	10	1	11

== Athletics ==
In total, four Seychellois athletes participated in the athletics events – Joseph Adam in the men's 400 m, Danny Beauchamp in the men's high jump and the men's long jump, Giovanny Fanny in the men's 400 m hurdles and Paul Nioze in the men's triple jump.

The heats for the men's 400 m took place on 1 August 1992. Adam finished sixth in his heat in a time of 47.68 seconds and he did not advance to the quarter-finals.

The heats for the men's 400 m hurdles took place on 3 August 1992. Fanny finished sixth in his heat in a time of 52.63 seconds and he did not advance to the semi-finals.

Athlete	Event	Heat		Semifinal		Final	
Athlete	Event	Result	Rank	Result	Rank	Result	Rank
Joseph Adam	400 m	47.68	6	did not advance			
Giovanny Fanny	400 m hurdles	52.63	39	did not advance			

The qualifying round for the men's high jump took place on 31 July 1992. Beauchamp contested qualifying group B. His best jump of 2.1 m was not enough to advance to the final and he finished joint 33rd overall.

The qualifying round for the men's triple jump took place on 1 August 1992. Nioze contested qualifying group B. His best jump of 16.32 m was not enough to advance to the final and he finished 22nd overall.

The qualifying round for the men's long jump took place on 5 August 1992. Beauchamp contested qualifying group B. His best jump of 7.44 m was not enough to advance to the final and he finished 37th overall.

Athlete	Event	Qualification		Final	
Athlete	Event	Result	Rank	Result	Rank
Danny Beauchamp	High jump	2.10	33	did not advance	
Danny Beauchamp	Long jump	7.44	37	did not advance	
Paul Nioze	Triple jump	16.23	24	did not advance	

== Boxing ==
In total, two Seychellois athletes participated in the boxing events – Rival Cadeau in the light middleweight category and Roland Raforme in the light heavyweight category.

The first round of the light middleweight category took place on 27 July 1992. Cadeau defeated Mohamed Mesbahi of Morocco to advance to the second round. The second round took place on 2 August 1992. Cadeau lost to Raul Marquez of the United States.

The first round of the light heavyweight category took place on 29 July 1992. Raforme defeated Rick Timperi of Australia to advance to the second round. The second round took place on 31 July 1992. Raforme defeated Patrice Aouissi of France to advance to the quarter-finals. The quarter-finals took place on 4 August 1992. Raforme lost to Zoltán Béres of Hungary.

Athlete	Event	1 Round	2 Round	Quarterfinals	Semifinals	Final
Athlete	Event	Opposition Result	Opposition Result	Opposition Result	Opposition Result	Opposition Result
Rival Cadeau	Light middleweight	Mohamed Mesbahi (MAR); W 5-3	Raul Marquez (USA); L 3-20	did not advance		
Roland Raforme	Light heavyweight	Rick Timperi (AUS); W 27:7	Patrice Aouissi (FRA); W RSCH-2	Zoltán Béres (HUN); L 3-11	did not advance	

== Sailing ==
In total, one Seychellois athlete participated in the sailing events – Danny Adeline in the men's Lechner A-390.

The 10 races in the men's Lechner A-390 took place from 27 July to 2 August 1992. Adeline recorded his best finish in race 10 when he placed 20th. In total, Adeline accumulated a net 352 points and finished 36th overall.

Athlete	Event	Race										Net points	Final rank
Athlete	Event	1	2	3	4	5	6	7	8	9	10	Net points	Final rank
Danny Adeline	Lechner A-390	~~38~~	35	35	32	34	38	33	33	39	20	352.0	36

== Swimming ==
In total, four Seychellois athletes participated in the swimming events – Jean-Paul Adam, Ivan Roberts, Kenny Roberts and Elke Talma.

The heats for the men's 200 m freestyle took place on 26 July 1992. Adam finished sixth in his heat in a time of two minutes 9.99 seconds which was ultimately not fast enough to advance to the finals.

The heats for the men's 100 m breaststroke took place on 26 July 1992. Kenny Roberts finished fifth in his heat in a time of one minute 16.52 seconds which was ultimately not fast enough to advance to the finals.

The heats for the women's 200 m breaststroke took place on 27 July 1992. Talma finished seventh in her heat in a time of three minutes 12.13 seconds which was ultimately not fast enough to advance to the finals.

The heats for the men's 100 m freestyle took place on 28 July 1992. Ivan Roberts finished fifth in his heat in a time of 56.15 seconds which was ultimately not fast enough to advance to the finals. Kenny Roberts finished fourth in his heat in a time of 58.86 seconds which was ultimately not fast enough to advance to the finals.

The heats for the men's 400 m freestyle took place on 29 July 1992. Adam finished sixth in his heat in a time of four minutes 40.93 seconds which was ultimately not fast enough to advance to the finals.

The heats for the men's 200 m breaststroke took place on 29 July 1992. Kenny Roberts was disqualified from his heat.

The heats for the women's 100 m breaststroke took place on 29 July 1992. Talma finished fifth in her heat in a time of one minute 29.91 seconds which was ultimately not fast enough to advance to the finals.

The heats for the men's 50 m freestyle took place on 30 July 1992. Ivan Roberts finished second in his heat in a time of 25.44 seconds which was ultimately not fast enough to advance to the finals. Kenny Roberts finished seventh in his heat in a time of 26.78 seconds which was ultimately not fast enough to advance to the finals.

The heats for the women's 200 m individual medley took place on 30 July 1992. Talma finished sixth in her heat in a time of two minutes 53.41 seconds which was ultimately not fast enough to advance to the finals.

The heats for the men's 200 m individual medley took place on 31 July 1992. Kenny Roberts finished fifth in his heat in a time of two minutes 30.35 seconds which was ultimately not fast enough to advance to the finals. Adam finished sixth in his heat in a time of two minutes 35.35 seconds which was ultimately not fast enough to advance to the finals.

Athlete	Event	Heat		Final B		Final	
Athlete	Event	Time	Rank	Time	Rank	Time	Rank
Ivan Roberts	Men's 50 m freestyle	25.44	58	did not advance			
Ivan Roberts	Men's 100 m freestyle	56.15	67	did not advance			
Kenny Roberts	Men's 50 m freestyle	26.78	68	did not advance			
Kenny Roberts	Men's 100 m freestyle	58.86	72	did not advance			
Kenny Roberts	Men's 100 m breaststroke	1:16.52	58	did not advance			
Kenny Roberts	Men's 200 m breaststroke	DSQ		did not advance			
Kenny Roberts	Men's 200 m individual medley	2:30.35	51	did not advance			
Jean-Paul Adam	Men's 200 m freestyle	2:09.99	54	did not advance			
Jean-Paul Adam	Men's 400 m freestyle	4:40.93	46	did not advance			
Jean-Paul Adam	Men's 200 m individual medley	2:35.35	52	did not advance			
Elke Talma	Women's 100 m breaststroke	1:29.91	42	did not advance			
Elke Talma	Women's 200 m breaststroke	3:12.13	39	did not advance			
Elke Talma	Women's 200 m individual medley	2:53.41	43	did not advance			
