= Seychelles at the 2004 Summer Olympics =

- Flag of Seychelles
- IOC code: SEY
- NOC: Seychelles Olympic and Commonwealth Games Association

in Athens
- Competitors: 9 in 7 sports
- Flag bearer: Allan Julie
- Medals: Gold 0 Silver 0 Bronze 0 Total 0

Summer Olympics appearances (overview)
- 1980; 1984; 1988; 1992; 1996; 2000; 2004; 2008; 2012; 2016; 2020; 2024

Seychelles competed at the 2004 Summer Olympics in Athens, Greece, from 13 to 29 August 2004.

== Athletics ==
Two athletes represented Seychelles in 2004.

Men

Athlete	Event	Heat		Semifinal		Final	
Athlete	Event	Result	Rank	Result	Rank	Result	Rank
Evans Marie	400 m	48.23	6	did not advance			

Women

Athlete	Event	Heat		Semifinal		Final	
Athlete	Event	Result	Rank	Result	Rank	Result	Rank
Celine Laporte	100 m hurdles	13.92	8	did not advance			

Key

- Note–Ranks given for track events are within the athlete's heat only
- Q = Qualified for the next round
- q = Qualified for the next round as a fastest loser or, in field events, by position without achieving the qualifying target
- NR = National record
- N/A = Round not applicable for the event
- Bye = Athlete not required to compete in round

== Boxing ==
One boxer represented Seychelles in 2004.

Athlete	Event	Round of 32	Round of 16	Quarterfinals	Semifinals	Final	
Athlete	Event	Opposition Result	Opposition Result	Opposition Result	Opposition Result	Opposition Result	Rank
Kitson Julie	Light welterweight	Nourian (AUS); L 22–51	did not advance				

== Canoeing ==
One canoeist represented Seychelles in 2004.

=== Sprint ===
Athlete	Event	Heats		Semifinals		Final	
Athlete	Event	Time	Rank	Time	Rank	Time	Rank
Tony Lespoir	Men's K-1 500 m	2:02.669	6 q	2:04.975	9	did not advance	
Tony Lespoir	Men's K-1 1000 m	4:17.128	9	did not advance			

Qualification Legend: Q = Qualify to final; q = Qualify to semifinal

== Judo ==
One judoka represented Seychelles in 2004.

Athlete	Event	Round of 32	Round of 16	Quarterfinals	Semifinals	Repechage 1	Repechage 2	Repechage 3	Final / BM	
Athlete	Event	Opposition Result	Opposition Result	Opposition Result	Opposition Result	Opposition Result	Opposition Result	Opposition Result	Opposition Result	Rank
Francis Labrosse	−60 kg	Albarracín (ARG); L 0001–1001	did not advance							

== Sailing ==
One sailor represented Seychelles in 2004.

Open

Athlete	Event	Race											Net points	Final rank
Athlete	Event	1	2	3	4	5	6	7	8	9	10	M*	Net points	Final rank
Allan Julie	Laser	14	17	8	~~34~~	33	20	9	24	23	14	4	166	20

M = Medal race; OCS = On course side of the starting line; DSQ = Disqualified; DNF = Did not finish; DNS= Did not start; RDG = Redress given

== Swimming ==
Two swimmers represented Seychelles in 2004.

Men

Athlete	Event	Heat		Semifinal		Final	
Athlete	Event	Time	Rank	Time	Rank	Time	Rank
Bertrand Bristol	200 m butterfly	2:09.07	38	did not advance			

Women

Athlete	Event	Heat		Semifinal		Final	
Athlete	Event	Time	Rank	Time	Rank	Time	Rank
Shrone Austin	100 m breaststroke	1:19.02	43	did not advance			

== Weightlifting ==
One weightlifter represented Seychelles in 2004.

Athlete	Event	Snatch		Clean & Jerk		Total	Rank
Athlete	Event	Result	Rank	Result	Rank	Total	Rank
Richard Scheer	Men's −85 kg	140	16	165	12	305	12
