= Seychelles at the 2020 Summer Olympics =

- Flag of Seychelles
- IOC code: SEY
- NOC: Seychelles Olympic and Commonwealth Games Association

in Tokyo, Japan July 23, 2021 – August 8, 2021
- Competitors: 5 in 4 sports
- Flag bearers (opening): Felicity Passon; Rodney Govinden
- Flag bearer (closing): Rodney Govinden
- Medals: Gold 0 Silver 0 Bronze 0 Total 0

Summer Olympics appearances (overview)
- 1980; 1984; 1988; 1992; 1996; 2000; 2004; 2008; 2012; 2016; 2020; 2024; 2028

Seychelles competed at the 2020 Summer Olympics in Tokyo. Originally scheduled to take place from 24 July to 9 August 2020, the Games were postponed to 23 July to 8 August 2021, because of the COVID-19 pandemic. It was the nation's ninth appearance at the Summer Olympics, with the exception of the 1988 Summer Olympics in Seoul because of its partial support to the North Korean boycott.

== Competitors ==
The following is the list of number of competitors in the Games.

Sport	Men	Women	Total
Athletics	1	0	1
Judo	1	0	1
Sailing	1	0	1
Swimming	1	1	2
Total	4	1	5

== Athletics ==
Seychelles received a universality slot from the World Athletics to send one male athlete to the Olympics.

Key

- Note–Ranks given for track events are within the athlete's heat only
- Q = Qualified for the next round
- q = Qualified for the next round as a fastest loser or, in field events, by position without achieving the qualifying target
- NR = National record
- N/A = Round not applicable for the event
- Bye = Athlete not required to compete in round

Track & road events

Athlete	Event	Heat		Semifinal		Final	
Athlete	Event	Result	Rank	Result	Rank	Result	Rank
Ned Azemia	Men's 400 m hurdles	51.67	8	Did not advance			

== Judo ==
Seychelles received an invitation from the Tripartite Commission and the International Judo Federation to send Nantenaina Finesse in the men's middleweight category (90 kg) to the Olympics.

Athlete	Event	Round of 64	Round of 32	Round of 16	Quarterfinals	Semifinals	Repechage	Final / BM	
Athlete	Event	Opposition Result	Opposition Result	Opposition Result	Opposition Result	Opposition Result	Opposition Result	Opposition Result	Rank
Nantenaina Finesse	Men's –90 kg	Bye	Nyman (SWE); L 00–01	Did not advance					

== Sailing ==
Seychellois sailors qualified one boat in each of the following classes through the class-associated World Championships, and the continental regattas.

Athlete	Event	Race											Net points	Final rank
Athlete	Event	1	2	3	4	5	6	7	8	9	10	M*	Net points	Final rank
Rodney Govinden	Men's Laser	~~34~~	31	34	30	29	32	29	32	28	33	EL	278	33

M = Medal race; EL = Eliminated – did not advance into the medal race

== Swimming ==
Seychelles received a universality invitation from FINA to send two top-ranked swimmers (one per gender) in their respective individual events to the Olympics, based on the FINA Points System of June 28, 2021.

Athlete	Event	Heat		Semifinal		Final	
Athlete	Event	Time	Rank	Time	Rank	Time	Rank
Simon Bachmann	Men's 200 m butterfly	2:03.54	38	Did not advance			
Felicity Passon	Women's 100 m backstroke	1:04.66	38	Did not advance			
Felicity Passon	Women's 200 m backstroke	2:16.18	26	Did not advance			
