= Seychelles at the 1984 Summer Olympics =

- Flag of Seychelles
- IOC code: SEY
- NOC: Seychelles Olympic and Commonwealth Games Association

in Los Angeles, United States 28 July–12 August 1984
- Competitors: 9 in 2 sports
- Flag bearer: Denis Rose
- Medals: Gold 0 Silver 0 Bronze 0 Total 0

Summer Olympics appearances (overview)
- 1980; 1984; 1988; 1992; 1996; 2000; 2004; 2008; 2012; 2016; 2020; 2024

Seychelles competed at the 1984 Summer Olympics in Los Angeles, United States.

== Athletics ==
Men's 10,000 metres

- Albert Marie

- Qualifying Heat — 32:04.11 (→ did not advance, 41st place)

Women's 100 metres

- Marie-Ange Wirtz

- First Heat — 12.61 (→ did not advance, 44th place out of 46)

Women's Long Jump

- Marie-Ange Wirtz

- Qualification — 5.21 m (→ did not advance, 23rd place)

== Boxing ==
Four boxers represented Seychelles in 1984.

Men's Lightweight (– 60 kg)

- Jean-Claude Labonte
  1. First Round — Bye
  2. Second Round — Lost to José Hernándo (Spain) on points (0-5)

Men's Light-welterweight (– 63.5 kg)

- Ramy Zialor
  1. First Round — Bye
  2. Second Round — Lost to Jean-Pierre Mbereke-Baban (Cameroon) on points (0-5)

Men's Welterweight (– 67 kg)

- Basil Boniface
  1. First Round — Bye
  2. Second Round — Lost to Kieran Joyce (Ireland) referee stopped contest (head blow)

Men's Light-middleweight (– 71 kg)

- Ralph Labrosse
  1. First Round — Bye
  2. Second Round — Beat Pierre Claver Mella (Cameroon) on points (4-1)
  3. Third Round — Lost to Gnohere Sery (Ivory Coast) on points (1-4)
