= Seychelles at the 2008 Summer Olympics =

- Flag of Seychelles
- IOC code: SEY
- NOC: Seychelles Olympic and Commonwealth Games Association

in Beijing
- Competitors: 9 in 6 sports
- Flag bearers: Georgie Cupidon (opening); Tony Lespoir (closing)
- Medals: Gold 0 Silver 0 Bronze 0 Total 0

Summer Olympics appearances (overview)
- 1980; 1984; 1988; 1992; 1996; 2000; 2004; 2008; 2012; 2016; 2020; 2024

Seychelles sent a delegation to compete at the 2008 Summer Olympics in Beijing, China.

== Athletics ==
Seychellois athletes have so far achieved qualifying standards in the following athletics events (up to a maximum of 3 athletes in each event at the 'A' Standard, and 1 at the 'B' Standard).

Men
Track & road events

Athlete	Event	Heat		Quarter-final		Semi-final		Final	
Athlete	Event	Result	Rank	Result	Rank	Result	Rank	Result	Rank
Danny D'Souza	100 m	11.00	7	Did not advance					

Field events

Athlete	Event	Qualification		Final	
Athlete	Event	Distance	Position	Distance	Position
Lindy Leveau-Agricole	Javelin throw	56.32	29	Did not advance	

Key

- Note–Ranks given for track events are within the athlete's heat only
- Q = Qualified for the next round
- q = Qualified for the next round as a fastest loser or, in field events, by position without achieving the qualifying target
- NR = National record
- N/A = Round not applicable for the event
- Bye = Athlete not required to compete in round

== Badminton ==
Athlete	Event	Round of 16	Quarterfinal	Semi-final	Final / BM	
Athlete	Event	Opposition Score	Opposition Score	Opposition Score	Opposition Score	Rank
Georgie Cupidon; Juliette Ah-Wan	Mixed doubles	Mateusiak / Kostiuczyk (POL); L 8–21, 19–21	Did not advance			

== Canoeing ==
=== Sprint ===
Athlete	Event	Heats		Semi-finals		Final	
Athlete	Event	Time	Rank	Time	Rank	Time	Rank
Tony Lespoir	Men's K-1 500 m	1:53.248	7	Did not advance			
Tony Lespoir	Men's K-1 1000 m	4:05.890	8	Did not advance			

Qualification Legend: QS = Qualify to semi-final; QF = Qualify directly to final

== Sailing ==
Men

Athlete	Event	Race											Net points	Final rank
Athlete	Event	1	2	3	4	5	6	7	8	9	10	M*	Net points	Final rank
Allan Julie	Laser	33	~~37~~	13	33	27	16	21	30	30	CAN	EL	203	32

M = Medal race; EL = Eliminated – did not advance into the medal race; CAN = Race cancelled

== Swimming ==
Men

Athlete	Event	Heat		Semi-final		Final	
Athlete	Event	Time	Rank	Time	Rank	Time	Rank
Dwayne Didon	50 m freestyle	28.95	84	Did not advance			

Women

Athlete	Event	Heat		Final	
Athlete	Event	Time	Rank	Time	Rank
Shrone Austin	400 m freestyle	4:35.86	41	Did not advance	

== Weightlifting ==
Athlete	Event	Snatch		Clean & Jerk		Total	Rank
Athlete	Event	Result	Rank	Result	Rank	Total	Rank
Terrence Dixie	Men's −85 kg	115	19	140	16	255	16
