= Swimming at the 2026 Commonwealth Games – Men's 100 metre butterfly =

Men's 100 metre butterfly at the 2026 Commonwealth Games
- Venue: Tollcross International Swimming Centre
- Dates: 25 July (heats, semifinals); 26 July (final)
- Winning time: 50.42 GR

Medalists
gold medal	Joshua Liendo	Canada
silver medal	Matthew Temple	Australia
bronze medal	Ben Armbruster	Australia

The men's 100 metre butterfly event at the 2026 Commonwealth Games was held on 25 and 26 July at the Tollcross International Swimming Centre.

== Schedule ==
The schedule is as follows:

All times are British Summer Time (UTC+1)

Date	Time	Round
Saturday 25 July 2026	10:30	Heats
Saturday 25 July 2026	19:00	Semifinals
Sunday 26 July 2026	19:00	Final

== Results ==
=== Heats ===
The heats was held on the morning of 25 July 2026.

Heat results
Rank	Heat	Lane	Swimmer	Nation	Time	Notes
1	5	4	Matthew Temple	Australia	51.30	Q
2	3	4	Edward Mildred	England	51.62	Q
3	5	5	Joshua Liendo	Canada	51.69	Q
4	4	4	Ben Armbruster	Australia	51.74	Q
5	3	3	Ruard van Renen	South Africa	52.14	Q
6	3	5	Harrison Turner	Australia	52.26	Q
7	4	3	Chad le Clos	South Africa	52.53	Q
7	4	5	Jacob Peters	England	52.53	Q
9	5	3	Lewis Fraser	Wales	52.67	Q
10	3	2	Matthew Hamilton	Northern Ireland	52.75	Q
11	3	6	Jarden Eaton	South Africa	52.84	Q
12	4	6	Evan Jones	Scotland	52.85	Q
13	5	6	Dean Fearn	Scotland	52.95	Q
14	4	2	Jesse Ssengonzi	Uganda	54.01	Q
15	5	7	Benjamin Loewen	Canada	54.40	Q
16	2	2	Oliver Benjamin Durand	Namibia	54.52	Q
17	4	1	Daniel Kish	Cayman Islands	54.78	R
18	3	7	Marvin Johnson	Bahamas	55.15	R
19	2	5	Elijah Daley	Bermuda	55.36	
20	5	1	Colins Obi Ebingha	Nigeria	55.45	
21	4	7	Jose Canjulo	Namibia	55.47	
22	3	8	Ethan Stubbs-Green	Antigua and Barbuda	55.54	
23	3	1	Zackary Gresham	Grenada	55.77	
24	5	2	Abdul Jabar Adama	Nigeria	55.81	
25	2	6	Stephen Nyoike	Kenya	55.87	
26	5	8	Peter Allen	Isle of Man	55.90	
27	4	8	Isaac Dodds	Jersey	56.01	
28	1	6	Emmanuel Gadson	Bahamas	56.55	
29	2	4	L.A.M. Beukes	Namibia	56.80	
30	2	3	Collins Phillip Saliboko	Tanzania	57.76	
31	2	8	Elijah Bain	Cayman Islands	58.50	
32	2	7	Victor Ashby	Barbados	59.22	
33	1	4	Jonathan Essien	Saint Kitts and Nevis	1:00.04	
34	2	1	Finau Ohuafi	Tonga	1:00.38	
35	1	5	Nathan Nagapin	Seychelles	1:03.57	
36	1	7	Adam Moncherry	Seychelles	1:04.16	
-	1	2	Moses Yongai	Sierra Leone	DNS	
-	1	3	Jordan Ssamula	Uganda	DSQ	

=== Semifinals ===
The semifinals took place during of the evening of 25 July 2026.

Semifinal results
Rank	Heat	Lane	Swimmer	Nation	Time	Notes
1	2	4	Matthew Temple	Australia	50.63	GR,Q
2	2	5	Joshua Liendo	Canada	50.67	Q
3	1	4	Edward Mildred	England	51.30	Q
4	1	5	Ben Armbruster	Australia	51.32	Q
5	2	3	Harrison Turner	Australia	51.69	Q
6	1	6	Lewis Fraser	Wales	52.08	Q
7	1	3	Jacob Peters	England	52.26	Q
8	2	6	Chad le Clos	South Africa	52.35	Q
9	2	2	Matthew Hamilton	Northern Ireland	52.62	R
10	1	7	Dean Fearn	Scotland	52.64	R
11	1	2	Jarden Eaton	South Africa	52.84	
12	2	7	Evan Jones	Scotland	52.99	
13	2	8	Oliver Benjamin Durand	Namibia	53.98	
14	1	1	Benjamin Loewen	Canada	54.05	
15	1	8	Daniel Kish	Cayman Islands	54.11	
16	2	1	Jesse Ssengonzi	Uganda	54.32	

=== Final ===
The final took place during of the evening of 26 July 2026.

Semifinal results
Rank	Lane	Swimmer	Nation	Time	Notes
1st place, gold medalist(s)	5	Joshua Liendo	Canada	50.42	GR
2nd place, silver medalist(s)	4	Matthew Temple	Australia	50.43	
3rd place, bronze medalist(s)	6	Ben Armbruster	Australia	50.58	
4	2	Harrison Turner	Australia	51.17	
5	8	Chad le Clos	South Africa	51.49	
6	3	Edward Mildred	England	51.59	
7	7	Lewis Fraser	Wales	52.24	
8	1	Jacob Peters	England	52.72	
