= Seychelles at the 1992 Summer Paralympics =

- Flag of Seychelles
- IPC code: SEY

in Barcelona
- Competitors: 2 in 2 sports
- Medals: Gold 0 Silver 0 Bronze 0 Total 0

Summer Paralympics appearances (overview)
- 1992; 1996–2012; 2016; 2020–2024

Seychelles competed at the 1992 Summer Paralympics in Barcelona, Spain, making their Paralympic Games debut. The country sent a two sportspeople strong delegation that included athlete Elvis Victor and swimmer Cyrl Charles. Neither sportsperson won a medal, and Seychelles would not compete at another Paralympic Games until the 2016 Summer Paralympics in Rio.

== Background ==
The country made their Paralympic Games debut at the 1992 Games in Barcelona. Following these Games, they would be absent from the Paralympics until the 2016 Summer Paralympics in Rio. Seychelles Paralympic participation contrasts to its participation in Special Olympics's World Games. The country sent 31 competitors to the 1999 World Games and 34 to the 2003 Games. It also contrasts to the Deaflympics, where Seychelles has never sent a team.

== Team ==
The delegation consisted of two competitors: Elvis Victor, who competed in one track and field athletics event, and Cyrl Charles, who competed in one swimming event. Charles was also registered to compete in track and field athletics in the men's shot put THS4, but he did not participate in that event. The team left Barcelona not having won any medals.

== Athletics ==
Elvis Victor competed in one track and field athletics event. Competing in the men's shot put THS4, he threw a best distance of 5.68m to finish eighth. Cyrl Charles was also registered to compete in track and field athletics in the men's shot put THS4, but he did not participate in that event.

Athlete	Event	Result	Rank
Elvis Victor	Men's shot put THS4	5.68	8
Cyrl Charles	Men's Shot Put THS3	dns	dns

== Swimming ==
Cyrl Charles competed in one swimming event. He posted a time of 41.59 in heat 1, finishing eighth and not advancing out of the heats.

Athlete	Event	Heats		Final	
Athlete	Event	Result	Rank	Result	Rank
Cyrl Charles	Men's 50 m freestyle S10	41.59	24	did not advance	

== See also ==
- Seychelles at the 1992 Summer Olympics
