= Seychelles at the 2016 Summer Paralympics =

- Flag of Seychelles
- IPC code: SEY
- NPC: Paralympic Association of Seychelles

in Rio de Janeiro
- Competitors: 1 in 1 sports
- Flag bearer: Cyril Charles
- Medals: Gold 0 Silver 0 Bronze 0 Total 0

Summer Paralympics appearances (overview)
- 1992; 1996–2012; 2016; 2020–2024

Seychelles sent a delegation to compete at the 2016 Summer Paralympics in Rio de Janeiro, Brazil, from 7 to 18 September 2016. This was the second time that the country took part in the Summer Paralympic Games after it made its debut twenty-four years prior at the 1992 Summer Paralympics and established a new National Paralympic Committee with assistance from UK Sport. Discus thrower Cyril Charles was the only competitor that the nation sent to Rio de Janeiro. In his event, the men's Javelin F56–57, he ranked fourteenth and last out of all the competing athletes with a personal best throw of 16.97 metres.

== Background ==
Seychelles made its Paralympic debut at the 1992 Summer Paralympics in Barcelona, Spain. Following these Games, they would be absent from the Paralympics for twenty-four years until the country received assistance from UK Sport in trying to establish a new National Paralympic Committee (NPC) in 2013 with a meeting held between NPC Rwanda President Dominique Bizimana and UK Sport Senior Adviser Elias Musangeya met with Seychelles' Social Affairs, Community Development and Sports Minister Vincent Meriton to discuss the feasibility of this. The Paralympic Association of Seychelles was formally established on 13 July 2013 and it became affiliated with the International Paralympic Committee. These Rio de Janeiro Paralympics were Seychelles' second appearance at a Summer Paralympiad. The 2016 Summer Paralympics were held from 7–18 September 2016 with a total of 4,328 athletes representing 159 NPCs taking part. The country sent one competitor to Rio de Janeiro, javelin thrower Cyril Charles. He was accompanied by coach Vincent Cedras and doctor Lucia Banane and they received sponsorship from Barclays Bank Seychelles to pay for their expenditure for the Games. Charles was chosen to be the flag bearer for the parade of nations during the opening ceremony.

== Disability classification ==
Every participant at the Paralympics has their disability grouped into one of five disability categories; amputation, the condition may be congenital or sustained through injury or illness; cerebral palsy; wheelchair athletes, there is often overlap between this and other categories; visual impairment, including blindness; Les autres, any physical disability that does not fall strictly under one of the other categories, for example dwarfism or multiple sclerosis. Each Paralympic sport then has its own classifications, dependent upon the specific physical demands of competition. Events are given a code, made of numbers and letters, describing the type of event and classification of the athletes competing. Some sports, such as athletics, divide athletes by both the category and severity of their disabilities, other sports, for example swimming, group competitors from different categories together, the only separation being based on the severity of the disability.

== Athletics ==
Seychelles was assigned one wild card spot for a competitor in athletics. Cyril Charles was 53 years old at the time of the Rio Summer Paralympic Games and he was competing in the Paralympics for the second time after representing Seychcelles at the 1992 Summer Paralympics. His left leg was amputated below the knee because of a grenade explosion while serving in the Seychelles People's Defence Force in August 1980. Charles competes in a wheelchair and is classified as F57. He trained with coach Vincent Cedras and the national team coach as part of his preparation for the Paralympics. Cedras said that the possibility of Charles winning a medal was unrealistic due to a lack of intensive training, "We will be facing people who live and breathe javelin, the best from across the world but you never know in sports what can happen. We might get lucky." He competed in the men's javelin F56–57 competition on 12 September. Charles ranked fourteenth and last out of all the competing athletes with a personal best throw of 16.97 metres. He said afterwards that he was not satisfied with his performance due to the equipment he used during his training which he deemed inadequate.

=== Men's Field ===
Athlete	Events	Result	Rank
Cyril Charles	Javelin F56–57	16.97	14

== See also ==
- Seychelles at the 2016 Summer Olympics
