= Seychelles at the 2012 Summer Olympics =

- Flag of Seychelles
- IOC code: SEY
- NOC: Seychelles Olympic and Commonwealth Games Association

in London
- Competitors: 6 in 4 sports
- Flag bearers: Dominic Dugasse (opening); Lissa Labiche (closing)
- Medals: Gold 0 Silver 0 Bronze 0 Total 0

Summer Olympics appearances (overview)
- 1980; 1984; 1988; 1992; 1996; 2000; 2004; 2008; 2012; 2016; 2020; 2024

The African island country of Seychelles competed at the 2012 Summer Olympics in London, United Kingdom, held from 27 July to 12 August 2012. This was the nation's eighth appearance at the Olympics, except the 1988 Summer Olympics in Seoul because of its partial support to the North Korean boycott.

The Seychelles Olympic and Commonwealth Games Association (SOCGA) sent the nation's smallest delegation to the Games. A total of 6 athletes, 4 men and 2 women, competed in four different sports. Four Seychellois athletes received their spots in track and field, and in swimming by wild card entries. Judoka and Olympic qualifier Dominic Dugasse was the nation's flag bearer at the opening ceremony. For the first time since 1984, Seychellois athletes did not qualify in sailing and weightlifting.

Seychelles has yet to win its first ever Olympic medal.

== Athletics ==
With no one outright qualifying Jean-Yves Esparon was picked to compete by the Seychelles Athletics Federation, he had just recently broke the national junior 200 meters record. The 17 year old ran his heat in 21.99 seconds and came in 8th so didn't qualify for the next round. Lissa Labiche received an invite to the Games from the IAAF after winning the gold medal at the African Athletics Championships, at the Olympics she was the youngest female high jumper and finished 10th in her qualifying pool and 20th overall so didn't reach the final.

Key

- Note–Ranks given for track events are within the athlete's heat only
- Q = Qualified for the next round
- q = Qualified for the next round as a fastest loser or, in field events, by position without achieving the qualifying target
- NR = National record
- N/A = Round not applicable for the event
- Bye = Athlete not required to compete in round

Men

Athlete	Event	Heat		Semifinal		Final	
Athlete	Event	Result	Rank	Result	Rank	Result	Rank
Jean-Yves Esparon	200 m	21.99	8	Did not advance			

Women

Athlete	Event	Qualification		Final	
Athlete	Event	Distance	Position	Distance	Position
Lissa Labiche	High jump	1.85	20	Did not advance	

== Boxing ==
Seychelles has qualified one boxer. Allisop won his ticket to the 2012 Summer Olympics when he reached the semifinals at the African Olympic qualification tournament held in Morocco, at the games he was up against Indian boxer Jai Bhagwan who had reached the quarterfinals of the 2011 World Amateur Boxing Championships in Baku. Allisop lost all three rounds with the final score being 8-18.

Men

Athlete	Event	Round of 32	Round of 16	Quarterfinals	Semifinals	Final	
Athlete	Event	Opposition Result	Opposition Result	Opposition Result	Opposition Result	Opposition Result	Rank
Andrique Allisop	Lightweight	Bhagwan (IND); L 8–18	Did not advance				

== Judo ==
Seychelles has qualified 1 judoka Judoka Dugasse automatically qualified through the African Judo Union Continental quota when he amassed over 30 points for his weight division, Dugasse was unlucky to have been drawn against 2008 Summer Olympics bronze medalist Henk Grol and he was beaten after 1 minute 27 seconds.

Athlete	Event	Round of 32	Round of 16	Quarterfinals	Semifinals	Repechage	Final / BM	
Athlete	Event	Opposition Result	Opposition Result	Opposition Result	Opposition Result	Opposition Result	Opposition Result	Rank
Dominic Dugasse	Men's −100 kg	Grol (NED); L 0000–1001	Did not advance					

== Swimming ==
Both swimmers were invited to compete by FINA, Mangroo finished his heat in 6th place and 50th overall so didn't qualify for the next round, Fanchette was only 14 years old and finished her heat last and 35th overall and didn't advance to the next round.

Men

Athlete	Event	Heat		Semifinal		Final	
Athlete	Event	Time	Rank	Time	Rank	Time	Rank
Shane Mangroo	100 m freestyle	56.46	50	Did not advance			

Women

Athlete	Event	Heat		Semifinal		Final	
Athlete	Event	Time	Rank	Time	Rank	Time	Rank
Aurelie Fanchette	200 m freestyle	2:23.49	35	Did not advance			
