= List of Seychellois records in athletics =

The following are the national records in athletics in the Seychelles maintained by the Seychelles Athletics Federation (SAF).

== Outdoor ==
Key to tables: Awaiting ratification Record not kept by SAF Not ratified or later rescinded by SAF

h = hand timing
A = affected by altitude

=== Men ===
Event	Record	Athlete	Date	Meet	Place	Ref.
100 m	10.33 (+0.9 m/s)	Dylan Sicobo	23 July 2017	Jeux de la Francophonie	Abidjan, Ivory Coast	
100 m	10.33 (+0.1 m/s)	Dylan Sicobo	24 July 2017	Jeux de la Francophonie	Abidjan, Ivory Coast	
100 m	10.2 h	Danny Benoit	16 May 1998		Seychelles	
150 m	17.19 NWI	Dave Dick	22 February 2002		Seychelles	
150 m	15.7 h NWI	Ned Azemia	18 February 2017		Seychelles	
200 m	21.10 A (+0.9 m/s)	Leeroy Henriette	1 June 2013 (Note: by federation source; 2 June 2013 by World Athletics source)		Gaborone, Botswana	
300 m	34.59	Stephen Banane	10 September 1995		Seychelles	
300 m	34.0 h	Ned Azemia	22 January 2017		Seychelles	
400 m	47.08	Joseph Adam	16 May 1993		Clemson, United States	
400 m	47.3 h	Ned Azemia	18 March 2017		Seychelles	
600 m	1:21.0 h	Selwyn Bonne	30 January 1999		Seychelles	
800 m	1:51.44	Selwyn Bonne	12 August 1998		Reunion	
800 m	1:51.2 h	Selwyn Bonne	24 April 1999		Victoria, Seychelles	
1000 m	2:26.75	Selwyn Bonne	22 January 2005		Seychelles	
1000 m	2:28.2 h	Ronny Marie	5 April 1999		Mauritius	
1500 m	3:52.46	Ronny Marie	5 May 2001		Victoria, Seychelles	
2000 m	5:39.6 h	Simon Labiche	16 January 2007		Seychelles	
Mile	4:14.75	Ronny Marie	1 April 2000		Seychelles	
3000 m	8:16.68	Ronny Marie	10 March 2001		Victoria, Seychelles	
5000 m	14:22.30	Simon Labiche	23 May 2003		Nairobi, Kenya	
10,000 m	31:05.55	Simon Labiche	21 June 1997		Durban, South Africa	
10,000 m	30:48.66	Iven Moise	29 August 2023	Indian Ocean Island Games	Antananarivo, Madagascar	
10 km (road)	30:04	Simon Labiche	13 March 1997		Seychelles	
15 km (road)	44:44	Simon Labiche	23 June 2001		Seychelles	
Half marathon	1:06:10	Antoine Simon Labiche	24 October 1999		Seychelles	
Marathon	2:25:48	Albert Marie	23 October 1988	Seychelles Marathon	Victoria, Seychelles	
110 m hurdles	14.49	William Gamatis	17 September 1995	All-Africa Games	Harare, Zimbabwe	
200 m hurdles	23.84	Stephen Banane	20 April 1996		Reunion	
200 m hurdles	23.4 h	Stephen Banane	24 September 2006		Seychelles	
400 m hurdles	50.74	Ned Azemia	15 August 2016	Olympic Games	Rio de Janeiro, Brazil	
400 m hurdles	49.82 (Note: not ratified by SAF but recognised by World Athletics)	Ned Azemia	19 May 2018		El Dorado, United States	
3000 m steeplechase	8:47.99	Ronny Marie	26 May 2001		Victoria, Seychelles	
High jump	2.20 m	Eugéne Ernesta	14 July 2000	African Championships	Algiers, Algeria	
High jump	2.20 m	William Woodcock	13 June 2010	Seychelles Youth Championships + Senior Guests	Victoria, Seychelles	
High jump	2.20 m	William Woodcock	9 October 2010	Commonwealth Games	New Delhi, India	
Pole vault	3.90 m	Donny Magnan	17 September 1995	All-Africa Games	Harare, Zimbabwe	
Long jump	7.86 m (−1.3 m/s)	Danny Beauchamp	28 June 1992		Belle Vue Maurel, Mauritius	
Triple jump	16.80 m (+0.8 m/s)	Paul Nioze	27 August 1990	Indian Ocean Island Games	Antananarivo, Madagascar	
Shot put	15.56 m	Selwyn Beauchamp	8 March 2008		Victoria, Seychelles	
Discus throw	45.36 m	Selwyn Beauchamp	4 September 2003		Bambous, Mauritius	
Hammer throw	50.75 m	Dean William	23 July 2019		Mauritius	
Javelin throw	56.85 m (Note: by World Athletics, 56.86 m by SAF source)	Gonzague Boniface	14 May 1989		Réduit, Mauritius	
Decathlon	6727 pts	Percy Laramé	25–26 August 1993	Indian Ocean Island Games	Victoria, Seychelles	
Decathlon	100m (wind) / Long jump (wind) / Shot put / High jump / 400m / 110m H (wind) / Discus / Pole vault / Javelin / 1500m; 11.04 / 7.21 m / 11.60 m / 194 m / 51.78 / 15.73 / 39.00 m / 3.80 m / 51.04 m / 5:35.45					
10,000 m walk (track)	57:08.1	Rennick Belize	13 August 2015		Seychelles	
20 km walk (road)	2:12:52	Rennick Wayne Pierre Bélize	19 April 2013		Belle Vue Maurel, Mauritius	
50 km walk (road)						
4 × 100 m relay	40.31	Seychelles; Sharry Dodin; Dylan Sicobo; Ned Azemia; Leeroy Henriette	25 July 2017	Jeux de la Francophonie	Abidjan, Ivory Coast	
4 × 400 m relay	3:11.28	Seychelles; Joseph Adam; A. Faure; V. Hoareau; Alain Souffe	30 August 1990	Indian Ocean Island Games	Antananarivo, Madagascar	

=== Women ===
Event	Record	Athlete	Date	Meet	Place	Ref.
100 m	11.86 NWI	Joanne Pricilla Loutoy	28 June 2014	Mauritian Championships	Bambous, Mauritius	
100 m	11.7 h NWI	Joanna Hoareau	12 April 2000		Madagascar	
150 m	18.40 NWI	Joanna Hoareau	4 March 2000		Seychelles	
150 m	17.6 h NWI	Joanne Lou-Toye	14 February 2014		Seychelles	
200 m	24.35 (+1.9 m/s)	Natasha Chetty	12 April 2024	Beach Invitational	Long Beach, United States	
300 m	40.42	Joanna Hoareau	30 March 2001		Seychelles	
300 m	41.1 h	Joanna Hoareau	13 February 1999		Seychelles	
400 m	57.04 (Note: ratified by SAF but not recognised by World Athletics)	Mirenda Francourt	27 May 1993		United States	
400 m	57.05 (Note: recognised as national record by World Athletics)	Mirenda Francourt	4 April 1993		LaGrange, France	
400 m	56.0 h	Joanna Hoareau	13 May 2000		Seychelles	
600 m	1:43.9 h	Natacha Bibi	13 February 1999		Seychelles	
800 m	2:13.50	Natasha Bibi	12 August 2011	Indian Ocean Island Games	Victoria, Seychelles	
1000 m	3:08.8 h	Natacha Bibi	13 May 2000		Seychelles	
1500 m	4:37.89	Margaret Morel	30 July 1980		Moscow, Soviet Union	
2000 m	6:47.4 h	Phylis Labonne	16 January 2007		Seychelles	
Mile	5:22.1 h	Phylis Labonne	17 March 2007		Seychelles	
3000 m	10:17.8 h	Margaret Morel	15 November 1981		Victoria, Seychelles	
5000 m	18:17.7 h (Note: by World Athletics and SAF sources; also 18:17.17 by SAF source)	Phylis Labonne	14 April 2007		Victoria, Seychelles	
10,000 m	41:07.8	Simone Zapha	28 April 2006		Victoria, Seychelles	
15 km (road)	58:34	Simone Zapha	22 June 2002		Seychelles	
Half marathon	1:30:26	Simone Zapha	23 September 2006		Victoria, Seychelles	
Marathon	3:34:49	Simone Zapha	5 July 2009		Réunion	
Marathon	3:30:53 (Note: not ratified by SAF but recognised by World Athletics)	Simone Zapha	6 June 2010		Le Tampon, Réunion	
Marathon	3:30:19	Simone Zapha	15 February 2009		Beau Vallon, Mauritius	
100 m hurdles	13.70 (+1.3 m/s)	Céline Laporte	24 July 2004		Niort, France	
400 m hurdles	1:02.55	Mirenda Francourt	16 September 1992	World Junior Championships	Seoul, South Korea	
3000 m steeplechase						
High jump	1.92 m A	Lissa Labiche	9 May 2015 (Note: by World Athletics, 8 May 2015 by SAF source)	South African Open Championships	Potchefstroom, South Africa	
Pole vault						
Long jump	6.57 m (+0.8 m/s)	Céline Laporte	24 March 2006	Melbourne Track Classic	Melbourne, Australia	
Triple jump	12.95 m A NWI	Janet Boniface	16 July 2011	Kenyan Championships	Nairobi, Kenya	
Shot put	13.94 m	Helda Marie	8 June 2002		Germiston, South Africa	
Discus throw	45.84 m	Lindy Leveau-Agricole	24 June 2005		Victoria, Seychelles	
Hammer throw	42.79 m	Helda Marie	2 February 2007		Seychelles	
Hammer throw	44.55 m (Note: not ratified by SAF but recognised by World Athletics)	Helda Marie	3 March 2007		Victoria, Seychelles	
Hammer throw	53.86 m	Murielle Manieca	18 April 2015		Saint-Denis, Réunion	
Javelin throw	57.86 m	Lindy Leveaux-Agricole	25 June 2005		Victoria, Seychelles	
Heptathlon	5684 pts	Céline Laporte	4–5 July 2005		Saint-Cyr-sur-Loire, France	
Heptathlon	100m H (wind) / High jump / Shot put / 200m (wind) / Long jump (wind) / Javelin / 800m; 14.07 / 1.72 m / 10.87 m / 25.30 / 6.28 m / 40.34 m / 2:23.26					
5000 m walk (track)	28:58.61	Ana Barra	3 August 2015		Reunion	
20 km walk (road)						
4 × 100 m relay	47.75	Seychelles; A. Khan; Lissa Labiche; J. Boniface; Joanne Pricilla Loutoy	12 August 2011	Indian Ocean Island Games	Victoria, Seychelles	
4 × 400 m relay	3:52.38	Seychelles; Rency Larue; Céline Laporte; Bryna Anacoura; Joanna Hoareau	6 September 2003		Bambous, Mauritius	

== Indoor ==
=== Men ===
Event	Record	Athlete	Date	Meet	Place	Ref.
60 m	6.82 (Note: by official result source; 6.92 by World Athletics Statistic Handbook source, probably a typo)	Dylan Sicobo	3 March 2018	World Championships	Birmingham, United Kingdom	
200 m						
400 m	48.29	Ned Azemia	11 January 2019		College Station, United States	
800 m	1:54.14	Gaylord Silly	5 January 2013		Aubière, France	
1500 m	3:56.24	Gaylord Silly	27 January 2019		Bordeaux, France	
3000 m						
60 m hurdles						
High jump	2.18 m	William Woodcock	7 February 2007	BW-Bank Meeting	Karlsruhe, Germany	
Pole vault						
Long jump	7.48 m	Danny Beauchamp	30 January 1993		Paris, France	
Triple jump	16.15 m	Paul Niozé	11 January 1992		Zaragoza, Spain	
Shot put						
Heptathlon						
Heptathlon	60m / Long jump / Shot put / High jump / 60m H / Pole vault / 1000m					
5000 m walk						
4 × 400 m relay						

=== Women ===
Event	Record	Athlete	Date	Meet	Place	Ref.
60 m	7.59	Joanna Houareau	11 March 2001	World Championships	Lisbon, Portugal	
200 m	24.55 A	Natasha Chetty	23 February 2024	Mountain West Championships	Albuquerque, United States	
400 m	58.52 A	Natasha Chetty	9 February 2024	Don Kirby Elite Invitational	Albuquerque, United States	
800 m	2:21.89	Céline Laporte	5 February 2006		Nogent-sur-Oise, France	
1500 m						
3000 m						
60 m hurdles	8.60	Céline Laporte	15 January 2006		Bompas, France	
60 m hurdles	8.60	Céline Laporte	18 February 2006		Bordeaux, France	
High jump	1.89 m	Lissa Labiche	20 March 2016	World Championships	Portland, United States	
Pole vault						
Long jump	6.40 m	Céline Laporte	26 February 2006		Aubière, France	
Triple jump						
Shot put	10.82 m	Céline Laporte	5 February 2006		Nogent-sur-Oise, France	
Pentathlon	4014 pts	Céline Laporte	15 January 2006		Bompas, France	
Pentathlon	60m H / High jump / Shot put / Long jump / 800m; 8.60 / 1.69 m / 10.58 m / 6.07 m / 2:26.35					
3000 m walk						
4 × 400 m relay						
