= Seychelles at the Olympics =

- Flag of Seychelles
- IOC code: SEY
- NOC: Seychelles Olympic and Commonwealth Games Association
- Medals: Gold 0 Silver 0 Bronze 0 Total 0

Summer appearances
- 1980; 1984; 1988; 1992; 1996; 2000; 2004; 2008; 2012; 2016; 2020; 2024; 2028

Seychelles first participated at the Olympic Games in 1980, and has sent athletes to compete in every Summer Olympic Games, missing only the 1988 Games when Seychelles did not respond to the invitation sent by the IOC. The nation has never participated in the Winter Olympic Games.

To date, no Seychellois athlete has ever won an Olympic medal. Their highest finish is a quarterfinal (joint 5th) placement by boxers Roland Raforme and Rival Cadeau, competing at the light heavyweight event at the 1992 Summer Olympics and the light middleweight event at the 1996 Summer Olympics, respectively.

The National Olympic Committee for Seychelles was created in 1979 and recognized by the International Olympic Committee that same year.

== Medal tables ==
=== Medals by Games ===
Games	Athletes	Gold	Silver	Bronze	Total	Rank
1980 Moscow	11	0	0	0	0	–
1984 Los Angeles	9	0	0	0	0	–
1988 Seoul	did not participate					
1992 Barcelona	11	0	0	0	0	–
1996 Atlanta	9	0	0	0	0	–
2000 Sydney	9	0	0	0	0	–
2004 Athens	9	0	0	0	0	–
2008 Beijing	9	0	0	0	0	–
2012 London	6	0	0	0	0	–
2016 Rio de Janeiro	10	0	0	0	0	–
2020 Tokyo	5	0	0	0	0	–
2024 Paris	3	0	0	0	0	–
2028 Los Angeles	future event					
2032 Brisbane	future event					
Total		0	0	0	0	–

== See also ==
- List of flag bearers for Seychelles at the Olympics
- Category:Olympic competitors for Seychelles
- Seychelles at the Paralympics
