= Galecki =

Galecki or Gałecki (Polish pronunciation: [ɡaˈwɛtski]; feminine: Gałecka, plural: Gałeccy) is a Polish-language surname. This surname combined with the suffix -ski and indicated someone who likely hailed from either Galica in Wejherowo, or Galice in the Polish village of Orłów. Noble families with the surname used the Junosza and Prus coats of arms.

The surname may refer to:

- Anna Gałecka (born 1974), Polish windsurfer
- Antoni Gałecki (1906–1958), Polish footballer
- Johnny Galecki (born 1975), American actor
- Tadeusz Gałecki (c. 1871–1937), the real name of Polish politician and activist Andrzej Strug
