= Seychelles at the Paralympics =

- Flag of Seychelles
- IPC code: SEY
- Medals: Gold 0 Silver 0 Bronze 0 Total 0

Summer appearances
- 1992; 1996–2012; 2016; 2020–2024

The Seychelles made their Paralympic Games début at the 1992 Summer Paralympics in Barcelona, with just two representatives. Cyrl Charles competed in swimming, while Elvis Victor entered the shot put. Neither man won a medal. Cyrl Charles also competed in 2016, aged 53.

== Background ==
The Seychelles is considered a developing country, with income classified as upper and middle among this group of countries with per capita GNI $3 256- $10 065 in 2004. This is similar to other African countries like Mauritius and South Africa, who have both participated at more Paralympic Games than the Seychelles.

By the early 1980s, services were being offered for people with disabilities in the Seychelles. Laws protecting people with disabilities have existed in the country for many years, with the National Council For Disabled Persons Act one such law. A 1981 census found there were 2,908 persons were registered as disabled. A similar survey in 1991 counted 732 people. A 1996 census counted 1,496 people with disabilities, most of which had more than one type of disability.

Internally in the government, disability sport has been mostly supported by the Community Development Department, in the Ministry of Community Development, Youth, Sports and Culture.

== History ==
The country made their Paralympic Games debut at the 1992 Games in Barcelona. Following these Games, they would be absent from the Paralympics until the 2016 Summer Paralympics in Rio. As of 2016, there are three athletes registered to participate in IPC sanctioned international events.

Following the 2012 Summer Paralympics, the country was assisted by UK Sport in trying to set up a new National Paralympic Committee. The process got underway in 2013, when NPC Rwanda President Dominique Bizimana and UK Sport Senior Adviser Elias Musangeya met with Seychelle's Social Affairs, Community Development and Sports Minister Vincent Meriton to discuss the feasibility of this. In 2015, the British High Commission donated a swimming pool to support para-swimming in the country.

Seychelles Paralympic participation contrasts to its participation in Special Olympics's World Games. The country sent 31 competitors to the 1999 World Games and 34 to the 2003 Games. It also contrasts to the Deaflympics, where Seychelles has never sent a team.

== Full results for the Seychelles at the Paralympics ==
At the 1992 Summer Paralympics, Elvis Victor competed in one track and field athletics event. Competing in the men's shot put THS4, he threw a best distance of 5.68m to finish eighth. Cyrl Charles was also registered to compete in track and field athletics in the men's shot put THS4, but he did not participate in that event. Cyrl Charles competed in one swimming event. He posted a time of 41.59 in heat 1, finishing eighth and not advancing out of the heats.

Charles was back for the 2016 Summer Paralympics, where he posted a distance of 16.97 meters in the men's F56-F57 javelin event to finish fourteenth overall.

Name	Games	Sport	Event	Time	Rank
Cyrl Charles	1992 Barcelona	Swimming	Men's 50 m Freestyle S10	41.59	8th in heat 1; did not advance
Cyrl Charles	1992 Barcelona	Athletics	Men's Shot Put THS3	DNS	DNS
Elvis Victor	1992 Barcelona	Athletics	Men's Shot Put THS4	5.68	8th
Cyrl Charles	2016 Rio	Athletics	Javelin F56-57	16.97	14

== See also ==
- Seychelles at the Olympics
