= Seychelles Women's League =

- Founded: 2000; 26 years ago
- Country: Seychelles
- Confederation: CAF
- Number of clubs: 6
- International cup: CAF W-Champions League
- Current champions: Mont Fleuri Rovers (1st title) (2020)
- Most championships: Olympia Coast (5 titles)
- Current: 2025-26 W-League

The Seychelles Women's League is the top flight of women's association football in Seychelles. The competition is run by the Seychelles Football Federation.

== History ==
The first Seychelles women's championship was contested on 2000.

After years of absence, women’s football has made its comeback in 2020 with Mont Fleuri Rovers winning the first competition hosted in the new sporting era. The competition featured six teams, including three of the country's secondary schools.

The Women's Preseason League kick off on 6 April 2024 with both Mont Fleuri Rovers A and B teams going against Young Kestrels A and B teams respectively. Mont Fleuri Rovers eventually won the tournament, with Young Kestrels B and Marine Victoria City claiming the second and third-placing respectively.

The newly branded Seychelles Women’s League officially launched on 7 September 2024 with six teams competing in the competition. The inaugural season concluded on 3 May 2025 with Mont Flueri Rovers emerging as the Champions. An award ceremony was held on 30 May 2025 to recognise the individual excellence.

== Champions ==
The list of champions and runners-up:

Year	Champions	Runners-up
2000	Rovers United	Olympia Coast
2001	Olympia Coast	Rovers United
2002	Olympia Coast	Rovers United
2003	Dolphins FC	Olympia Coast
2004	Olympia Coast	Dolphins FC
2005	Ste Anne United	Dolphins FC
2006	Olympia Coast	Dolphins FC
2007	Olympia Coast	United Sisters
2008	United Sisters	La Digue Veuve
2009	United Sisters	La Digue Veuve
2010	La Digue Veuve	
2011		
2012		
2013		
2014		
2015		
2016		
2017		
2018		
2019	Mont Fleuri Rovers	
2020	Mont Fleuri Rovers	Marine Maintenance
2021	Postponed due to COVID-19 pandemic in Seychelles	
2022	Not Held	
2023	Not Held	
2024/25	Mont Fleuri Rovers	Marine Victoria City
2024/25		

== Goalscorers ==
Season	Player	Team	Goals
2006	(Seychelles) Natacha Bibi	Olympia Coast	14
2008	(Seychelles) Vesna Cesar	United Sisters	10
2010	(Seychelles) Natacha Bibi	La Digue Veuve	24
2017	(Seychelles) Natacha Bibi	Mont Fleuri Rovers	7
2020			
2025	(Seychelles) Emma Esparon	Marine Victoria City	15

Most time top scorer

- 3 times.
  - (Seychelles) Natacha Bibi (2006, 2010 and 2017)
