= Gaylord Silly =

Seychellois-French runner (born 1986)

Personal information
- Nationality: Seychellois
- Born: 20 February 1986 (age 40) Vendôme, France

Sport
- Sport: Running

Achievements and titles
- Personal best: Half-marathon: 1:10:44

Gaylord Lucien D. Silly (French pronunciation: [siji]; born 20 February 1986) is a French-Seychellois long-distance runner who represents Seychelles internationally. Born in Vendôme, France, to a Seychelloise mother and a French father, he holds dual nationality.

His first regional event came in 2007 when he finished fourth in the 3000 metres steeplechase at the 2007 Indian Ocean Island Games. After finishing 49th at the 2008 Cross Ouest France, he took part in the 2008 IAAF World Cross Country Championships as the sole representative of the Seychelles. Before the race, he stated that he wanted to push himself to his limits and said "my ambition is to make my country proud and to run a good race". His time of 43:03 for the 12 km men's race was over eight minutes behind the winner and he finished in 162nd place overall. Silly had been chosen by the Seychelles Athletics Federation instead of veteran Simon Labiche because Silly was living comparatively near to the race venue (Edinburgh, Scotland).

Silly ran in the Semi Marathon de Vendome in 2009, running a half marathon best of 1:10:44, and as a result he was selected to represent the Seychelles for a second time, forming part of a Seychellois trio (including Labiche and Simone Zapha) competing at the 2009 IAAF World Half Marathon Championships. He finished in 90th place out of 94 finishers, although his time of 1:11:57 was just enough to beat compatriot Labiche. He returned to the world cross country stage with an appearance at the 2010 IAAF World Cross Country Championships – again being the country's sole representative in the men's race. He finished in 121st position, over six minutes behind winner Joseph Ebuya who lapped him. However, Silly did manage to beat the entire four-man team sent by Iraq.

Silly also came home fifth, and last, place in his 800 metres heat at the 2012 IAAF World Indoor Championships. His time of 1:54.93 minutes was less than five seconds off Antonio Manuel Reina's winning time, but was enough for a new national indoor record. He represented the Seychelles at the 2013 Jeux de la Francophonie and came seventh in the 3000 metres steeplechase with a personal best of 9:08.47 minutes. On the regional scene, he finished twelfth in the steeplechase at the 2014 African Championships.

When not running competitively, Silly works as a tree surgeon in France.
