= Casimir Pereira =

Seychellois sprinter

Personal information
- Nationality: Seychellois
- Born: 4 March 1954 (age 71)

Sport
- Sport: Sprinting
- Event: 200 metres

Casimir Pereira (born 4 March 1954) is a Seychellois sprinter. He competed in the men's 200 metres, 4 × 100 metres relay, and 4 × 400 metres relay at the 1980 Summer Olympics.

Pereira set his 200 metres personal best of 22.0 seconds in 1979. The following year, he achieved a 400 m best of 49.0 seconds.

Pereira was one of the first fourteen men and two women to represent Seychelles at the Summer Olympics, and the 16 athletes were the first from any country to be granted access to the 1980 Olympic village after arriving on 27 June. Their plane tickets were paid for by the Soviet government. He told United Press International that his impressions of Moscow were "very pleasant" but that he was tired by the ceremonies and processing.

Pereira In the 1980 Olympic 200 m, Pereira ran 22.59 seconds to finish 7th in his heat, failing to advance. On 31 July, Pereira was entered in both the Seychellois 4 × 100 m and 4 × 400 m teams in their heats. As 3rd leg on the 4 × 100 m, he contributed to the team's 7th place finish in 41.71 seconds, while he anchored the 4 × 400 m to another 7th-place heat finish in 3:19.2. Both teams failed to advance. Pereira finished both heats with less than one hour of rest between them.

Pereira bore the flag for Seychelles at the 1980 Summer Olympics closing ceremony.
