= Olha Maslivets =

Ukrainian windsurfer

Personal information
- Native name: Ольга Вікторівна Маслівець
- Nationality: Ukrainian, Russian
- Born: 23 June 1978 (age 48) Ternopil, Ukrainian SSR

Sailing career
- Sport: Sailing
- Club: Osvita Ternopil

Achievements and titles
- Olympic finals: 2000 Sydney (23rd); 2004 Athens (10th); 2008 Beijing (8th); 2012 London (4th)
Medal record
Women's Windsurfing
Representing Ukraine

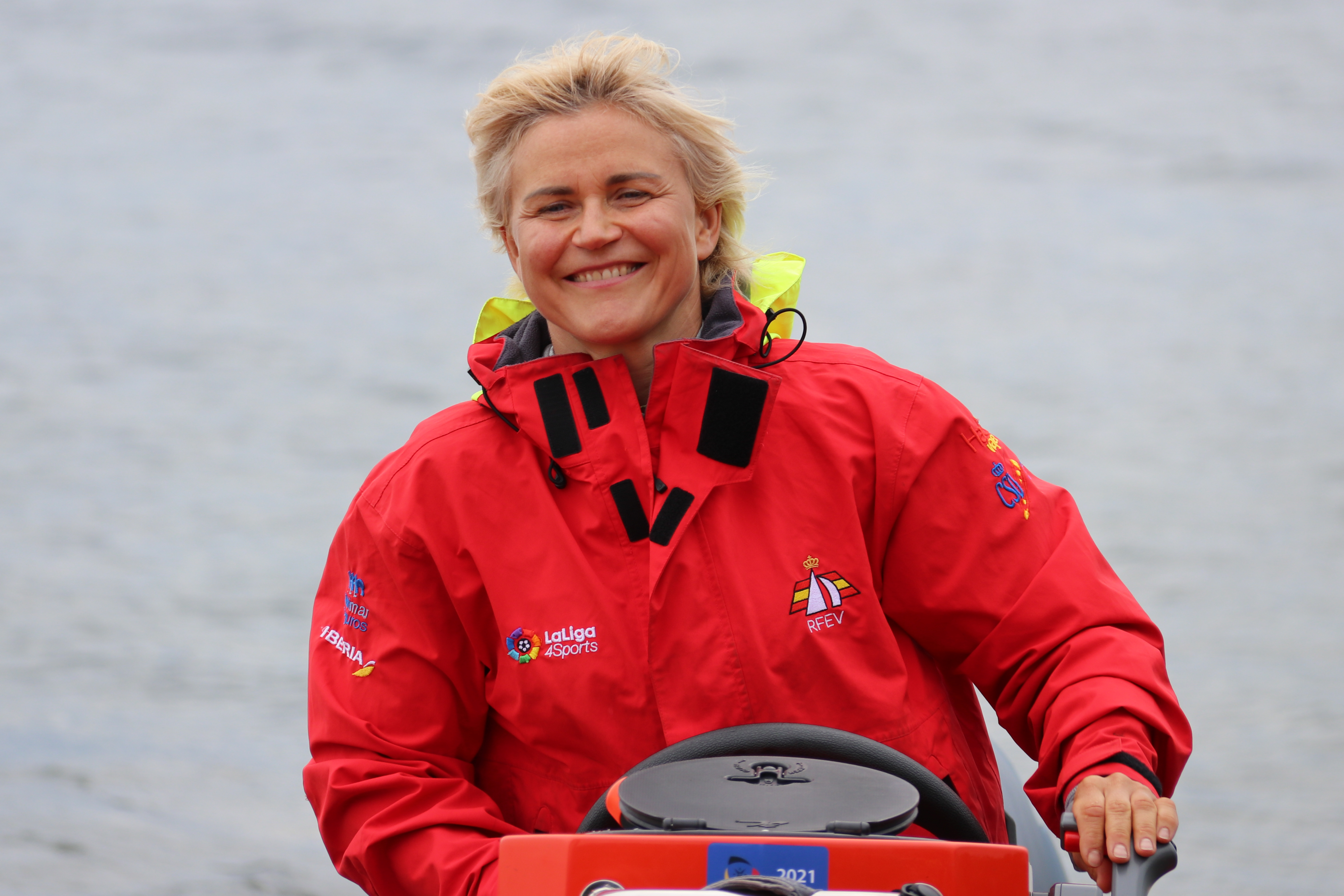
Olga Maslivets - Olha Maslivets

Olha Maslivets (Ukrainian: Ольга Вікторівна Маслівець), Olga Maslivets (Russian: Ольга Викторовна Масливец), (born 23 June 1978 in Ternopil) is a Ukrainian-born Russian windsurfer who has competed at four Olympic Games (2000, 2004, 2008 and 2012). Her best result came in 2012, when she finished 4th in the women's RS-X event.
