= 2022 FAS Tri-Nations Series =

International football tournament

2022 FAS Men's Tri-Nations Series
Tournament details
- Host country: Singapore
- Dates: 23–29 March 2022
- Teams: 3 (from 1 confederation)
- Venue: 1 (in 1 host city)

Final positions
- Champions: Singapore (1st title)
- Runners-up: Malaysia
- Third place: Philippines

Tournament statistics
- Matches played: 3
- Goals scored: 7 (2.33 per match)
- Top scorer(s): (Malaysia) Akhyar Rashid (Singapore) Ikhsan Fandi (2 goals)

The 2022 FAS Tri-Nations Series was a three-team association football tournament held at the National Stadium in Kallang, Singapore between 23 and 29 March 2022 for the men's competition and at Jalan Besar Stadium between 4 and 11 April for the women's competition.

The men's tournament was organized by the Football Association of Singapore in conjunction with the Football Association of Malaysia and the Philippine Football Federation as part of the three team's precursor for the third round of the 2023 AFC Asian Cup qualification matches. The three games in the tournament are authorized by FIFA as International "A" Matches. Singapore were the winners of the men's competition, having defeated both Malaysia (2–1) and the Philippines (2–0) in their respective matches.

For the women's competition, Singapore hosted the Seychelles and Papua New Guinea in preparation for the 31st SEA Games.

== Host selection ==
Singapore was selected by the other two football associations of Malaysia and the Philippines as the host of the tournament and was subsequently organised by Football Association of Singapore.

Singapore will host the women's competition as well.

== Venue ==
The proposed venue for the Tri-Nation Series was unveiled to be held at the National Stadium for the men's competition and Jalan Besar Stadium for the women's competition.

Singapore
Kallang
National Stadium	Jalan Besar Stadium
Capacity: 55,000	Capacity: 6,000
Location of stadiums of the 2022 FAS Tri-Nation Series

== Schedule ==
The men's competition was held from 23 to 29 March 2022 while the women's competition was held from 4 to 11 April 2022.

Event	Wed 23	Thu 24	Fri 25	Sat 26	Sun 27	Mon 28	Tue 29	Wed 30	Thu 31	Fri 1	Sat 2	Sun 3	Mon 4	Tue 5	Wed 6	Thu 7	Fri 8	Sat 9	Sun 10	Mon 11
Men																				
Women																				

== Men's competition ==
The match schedule was confirmed by FAS on 16 March 2022. The opening match, featuring Malaysia and Philippines, was played on 23 March 2022, 20:00 local time at the National Stadium. The hosts, Singapore, took on Malaysia and Philippines on 26 March and 29 March respectively at 20:00 local time.

=== Participating nations ===
Three nations participated in the tournament.

FIFA Rankings, as of 10 February 2022

Nation	FIFA ranking	Ref.
Singapore (Hosts)	161	
Malaysia	154	
Philippines	129	

=== Standings ===
- All times are National Standard Time – UTC+8

Pos	Team	Pld	W	D	L	GF	GA	GD	Pts
1	Singapore (H, C)	2	2	0	0	4	1	+3	6
2	Malaysia	2	1	0	1	3	2	+1	3
3	Philippines	2	0	0	2	0	4	−4	0

(C) Champions; (H) Hosts

=== Matches ===
23 March 2022
20:00

Malaysia	2–0	Philippines
Akhyar 3', 24'

National Stadium, Kallang, Singapore
Referee: Muhammad Taqi

26 March 2022
20:00

Singapore	2–1	Malaysia
Ikhsan 30', 76'		Krasniqi 57'

National Stadium, Kallang, Singapore
Attendance: 14,896
Referee: Ahmad A'qashah

29 March 2022
20:00

Singapore	2–0	Philippines
Safuwan 10'; Shawal 90'

National Stadium, Kallang, Singapore
Referee: Ahmad A'qashah

== Women's competition ==
2022 FAS Tri-Nations Series Women's
Tournament details
- Host country: Singapore
- Dates: 4–11 April 2022
- Teams: 3 (from 3 confederations)
- Venue: 1 (in 1 host city)

Final positions
- Champions: Papua New Guinea (1st title)
- Runners-up: Singapore
- Third place: Seychelles

Tournament statistics
- Matches played: 3
- Goals scored: 18 (6 per match)
- Top scorer(s): (Papua New Guinea) Sonia Emhabe (Papua New Guinea) Marie Kaipu (Papua New Guinea) Ramona Padio (Seychelles) Natacha Bibi (Singapore) Stephanie Domingues (Singapore) Danelle Tan (2 goals)

The opening match, featuring Singapore and Seychelles, will be played on 4 April 2022, 20:30 local time at the Jalan Besar Stadium. Seychelles will play Papua New Guinea on 8 April. Singapore will play the final match on 11 April against Papua New Guinea at 20:30 local time.

=== Participating nations ===
Three nations participated in the tournament.

FIFA Rankings, as of 25 March 2022

Nation	FIFA ranking	Ref.
Singapore (Hosts)	135	
Papua New Guinea	49	
Seychelles	NR	

=== Standings ===
- All times are National Standard Time – UTC+8

Pos	Team	Pld	W	D	L	GF	GA	GD	Pts
1	Papua New Guinea (C)	2	2	0	0	10	0	+10	6
2	Singapore (H)	2	1	0	1	6	3	+3	3
3	Seychelles	2	0	0	2	2	15	−13	0

(C) Champions; (H) Hosts

=== Matches ===
4 April 2022
20:30

Singapore	6–2	Seychelles
Domingues 19', 25'; Danelle 53', 90+6' (pen.); Dorcas 73'; Nurerwadah 90+3'	Report	Bibi 31', 72'

Jalan Besar Stadium, Kallang, Singapore

8 April 2022
20:30

Seychelles	0–9	Papua New Guinea
	Report	Cadeau 25' (o.g.); Kaipu 28', 52'; Gabong 45'; Gunemba 55'; Zale 69'; Padio 71', 81' (pen.); Emhabe 85'

Jalan Besar Stadium, Kallang, Singapore

11 April 2022
20:30

Singapore	0–1	Papua New Guinea
		Emhabe 74'

Jalan Besar Stadium, Kallang, Singapore

== Goalscorers ==
=== Men's competition ===
There were 7 goals scored in 3 matches, for an average of 2.33 goals per match.

2 goals

- (Malaysia) Akhyar Rashid
- (Singapore) Ikhsan Fandi

1 goal

- (Malaysia) Liridon Krasniqi
- (Singapore) Safuwan Baharudin
- (Singapore) Shawal Anuar

=== Women's competition ===
There were 18 goals scored in 3 matches, for an average of 6 goals per match.

2 goals

- (Papua New Guinea) Sonia Emhabe
- (Papua New Guinea) Marie Kaipu
- (Papua New Guinea) Ramona Padio
- (Seychelles) Natacha Bibi
- (Singapore) Stephanie Domingues
- (Singapore) Danelle Tan

1 goal

- (Papua New Guinea) Yvonne Gabong
- (Papua New Guinea) Megan Gunemba
- (Papua New Guinea) Sagude Zale
- (Singapore) Dorcas Chu
- (Singapore) Siti Nurerwadah

1 own goal

- (Seychelles) Rachel Cadeau (against Papua New Guinea)

== Broadcasting rights ==
Country/Region	Broadcaster	Ref.
Singapore	Mediacorp, meWATCH	
Malaysia	Astro	
Philippines	One Sports	

== Aftermath ==
=== Men's ===
2022 FAS Tri-Nations Series – Men's competition

Singapore

=== Women's ===
2022 FAS Tri-Nations Series – Women's competition

Papua New Guinea
