= Seychelles at the 2024 Summer Olympics =

- IOC code: SEY
- NOC: Seychelles Olympic and Commonwealth Games Association

in Paris, France 26 July 2024 – 11 August 2024
- Competitors: 3 (2 men and 1 woman) in 2 sports
- Flag bearers: Dylan Sicobo & Khema Elizabeth
- Medals: Gold 0 Silver 0 Bronze 0 Total 0

Summer Olympics appearances (overview)
- 1980; 1984; 1988; 1992; 1996; 2000; 2004; 2008; 2012; 2016; 2020; 2024

Seychelles competed at the 2024 Summer Olympics in Paris from 26 July to 11 August 2024. It was the nation's tenth consecutive appearance at the Summer Olympics except for Seoul 1988, due to political actions.

== Competitors ==
The following is the list of number of competitors in the Games.

Sport	Men	Women	Total
Athletics	1	0	1
Swimming	1	1	2
Total	2	1	3

== Athletics ==
Seychelles sent one sprinter to compete at the 2024 Summer Olympics.

Key

- Note–Ranks given for track events are within the athlete's heat only
- Q = Qualified for the next round
- q = Qualified for the next round as a fastest loser or, in field events, by position without achieving the qualifying target
- NR = National record
- N/A = Round not applicable for the event
- Bye = Athlete not required to compete in round

Track events

Athlete	Event	Preliminary		Heat		Semifinal		Final	
Athlete	Event	Result	Rank	Result	Rank	Result	Rank	Result	Rank
Dylan Sicobo	Men's 100 m	10.51	2 Q	10.62	9	Did not advance			

== Swimming ==
Seychelles sent two swimmers to compete at the 2024 Paris Olympics.

Athlete	Event	Heat		Semifinal		Final	
Athlete	Event	Time	Rank	Time	Rank	Time	Rank
Simon Bachmann	Men's 200 m medley	2:06.48	22	Did not advance			
Khema Elizabeth	Women's 50 m freestyle	28.18	47	Did not advance			

Qualifiers for the latter rounds (Q) of all events were decided on a time only basis, therefore positions shown are overall results versus competitors in all heats.
