= Vita Matīse =

Latvian windsurfer (born 1972)

Personal information
- Nationality: Latvia
- Born: 9 November 1972 (age 54) Rīga, Latvian SSR, Soviet Union
- Height: 1.76 m (5 ft 9 in)
- Weight: 63 kg (139 lb)

Sailing career
- Sport: Sailing
- Club: Andrezostia
- Class: Sailboard

Vita Matīse (born 9 November 1972 in Rīga) is a Latvian windsurfer, who specialized in Mistral One Design, Neil Pryde RS:X, and raceboarding classes. She represented Latvia in two editions of the Olympic Games (2000 and 2004), and has also placed outside the top ten in both Mistral and RS:X classes. In 2013, Matise returned to the sport from her nine-year hiatus and had changed her strategic game plan by delivering an impressive performance and her first ever trophy at the inaugural Raceboard World Championships in Pavlov, Czech Republic. As of May 2014, Matise is ranked no. 35 in the world for the sailboard class by the International Sailing Federation.

Matise made her official debut at the 2000 Summer Olympics in Sydney, where she placed twenty-second in women's Mistral sailboard with a net score of 170 points.

At the 2004 Summer Olympics in Athens, Matise qualified for her second Latvian team, as a 32-year-old, in the women's Mistral One Design class by receiving a berth from the 2004 Mistral World Championships in Çeşme, Turkey. Delivering a mediocre effort in the opening races, Matise posted a remarkable grade of 190 net points to pull off a twentieth-place effort in a fleet of twenty-six windsurfers.
