= María del Carmen Vaz =

Spanish windsurfer

Personal information
- Nationality: Spanish
- Born: 9 May 1968 (age 56)

Sport
- Sport: Windsurfing

María del Carmen Vaz (born 9 May 1968) is a Spanish windsurfer. She competed in the women's sailing event at the 2000 Summer Olympics.
