= Sailing at the 2000 Summer Olympics – Women's Mistral One Design =

Sailing at the Olympics

Women's Mistral One Design at the Games of the XXVII Olympiad
- Line drawing of the Mistral One Design
- Venue: Sydney
- Dates: First race: 17 September 2000; Last race: 24 September 2000
- Competitors: 29 from 29 nations

Medalists
1st place, gold medalist(s)		Alessandra Sensini	Italy
2nd place, silver medalist(s)		Amelie Lux	Germany
3rd place, bronze medalist(s)		Barbara Kendall	New Zealand

The Women's Mistral One Design Class was a sailing event on the Sailing at the 2000 Summer Olympics program in Sydney. Eleven races were scheduled and completed. 29 sailors, on 29 sailboards, from 29 nations competed.

== Race schedule ==
●	Event competitions	●	Event finals

Date	September																October
Date	15 Fri	16 Sat	17 Sun	18 Mon	19 Tue	20 Wed	21 Thu	22 Fri	23 Sat	24 Sun	25 Mon	26 Tue	27 Wed	28 Thu	29 Fri	30 Sat	1 Sun
Women's Mistral One Design			2	1	1	2	2	2	Spare day	1							

== Final results ==
Rank	Country	Helmsman	Race 1		Race 2		Race 3		Race 4		Race 5		Race 6		Race 7		Race 8		Race 9		Race 10		Race 11		Total	Total – discard
Rank	Country	Helmsman	Pos.	Pts.	Pos.	Pts.	Pos.	Pts.	Pos.	Pts.	Pos.	Pts.	Pos.	Pts.	Pos.	Pts.	Pos.	Pts.	Pos.	Pts.	Pos.	Pts.	Pos.	Pts.	Total	Total – discard
1st place, gold medalist(s)	Italy	Alessandra Sensini	3	3.0	1	1.0	3	3.0	2	2.0	1	1.0	~~4~~	~~4.0~~	1	1.0	2	2.0	1	1.0	~~12~~	~~12.0~~	1	1.0	31.0	15.0
2nd place, silver medalist(s)	Germany	Amelie Lux	1	1.0	2	2.0	1	1.0	1	1.0	~~4~~	~~4.0~~	2	2.0	2	2.0	~~3~~	~~3.0~~	2	2.0	2	2.0	2	2.0	22.0	15.0
3rd place, bronze medalist(s)	New Zealand	Barbara Kendall	2	2.0	3	3.0	2	2.0	3	3.0	~~7~~	~~7.0~~	1	1.0	3	3.0	1	1.0	~~5~~	~~5.0~~	1	1.0	3	3.0	31.0	19.0
4	United States	Carrie Butler-Beashel	~~DSQ~~	~~30.0~~	4	4.0	~~12~~	~~12.0~~	6	6.0	5	5.0	6	6.0	7	7.0	4	4.0	10	10.0	3	3.0	12	12.0	99.0	57.0
5	Australia	Jessica Crisp	13	13.0	~~15~~	~~15.0~~	4	4.0	4	4.0	9	9.0	8	8.0	4	4.0	~~16~~	~~16.0~~	3	3.0	4	4.0	10	10.0	90.0	59.0
6	Hong Kong	Lee Lai-shan	5	5.0	10	10.0	5	5.0	8	8.0	~~17~~	~~17.0~~	10	10.0	6	6.0	6	6.0	4	4.0	5	5.0	~~20~~	~~20.0~~	96.0	59.0
7	China	Zhang Chujun	10	10.0	~~17~~	~~17.0~~	8	8.0	~~11~~	~~11.0~~	6	6.0	3	3.0	5	5.0	5	5.0	8	8.0	8	8.0	7	7.0	88.0	60.0
8	Spain	María del Carmen Vaz	4	4.0	5	5.0	~~14~~	~~14.0~~	9	9.0	~~19~~	~~19.0~~	11	11.0	8	8.0	9	9.0	6	6.0	14	14.0	6	6.0	105.0	72.0
9	France	Lise Vidal	7	7.0	6	6.0	9	9.0	~~25~~	~~25.0~~	3	3.0	~~DSQ~~	~~30.0~~	10	10.0	8	8.0	21	21.0	6	6.0	5	5.0	130.0	75.0
10	Japan	Masako Imai	6	6.0	12	12.0	10	10.0	10	10.0	~~15~~	~~15.0~~	5	5.0	9	9.0	11	11.0	~~16~~	~~16.0~~	7	7.0	8	8.0	109.0	78.0
11	Poland	Anna Gałecka	8	8.0	7	7.0	~~13~~	~~13.0~~	5	5.0	8	8.0	9	9.0	12	12.0	7	7.0	~~14~~	~~14.0~~	13	13.0	11	11.0	107.0	80.0
12	Switzerland	Anja Käser	14	14.0	~~16~~	~~16.0~~	7	7.0	7	7.0	10	10.0	12	12.0	13	13.0	10	10.0	13	13.0	~~18~~	~~18.0~~	4	4.0	124.0	90.0
13	South Korea	Joo Soon-ahn	12	12.0	11	11.0	6	6.0	16	16.0	~~18~~	~~18.0~~	14	14.0	16	16.0	14	14.0	7	7.0	~~19~~	~~19.0~~	14	14.0	147.0	110.0
14	Israel	Michal Hein	11	11.0	8	8.0	~~21~~	~~21.0~~	14	14.0	14	14.0	~~DSQ~~	~~30.0~~	11	11.0	13	13.0	18	18.0	10	10.0	16	16.0	166.0	115.0
15	Finland	Minna Aalto	9	9.0	18	18.0	~~20~~	~~20.0~~	12	12.0	21	21.0	7	7.0	15	15.0	12	12.0	17	17.0	11	11.0	~~DSQ~~	~~30.0~~	172.0	121.0
16	Belgium	Sigrid Rondelez	~~21~~	~~21.0~~	13	13.0	11	11.0	19	19.0	11	11.0	16	16.0	17	17.0	~~26~~	~~26.0~~	12	12.0	9	9.0	19	19.0	174.0	127.0
17	Canada	Caroll-Ann Alie	15	15.0	~~21~~	~~21.0~~	16	16.0	~~27~~	~~27.0~~	12	12.0	17	17.0	18	18.0	20	20.0	11	11.0	15	15.0	15	15.0	187.0	139.0
18	Great Britain	Christine Johnston	~~25~~	~~25.0~~	9	9.0	26	26.0	17	17.0	2	2.0	18	18.0	19	19.0	24	24.0	19	19.0	~~26~~	~~26.0~~	13	13.0	198.0	146.0
19	Thailand	Napalai Tansai	16	16.0	23	23.0	~~25~~	~~25.0~~	21	21.0	16	16.0	15	15.0	14	14.0	17	17.0	~~25~~	~~25.0~~	17	17.0	9	9.0	198.0	148.0
20	Cook Islands	Turia Vogel	19	19.0	14	14.0	18	18.0	13	13.0	~~23~~	~~23.0~~	19	19.0	20	20.0	19	19.0	9	9.0	~~21~~	~~21.0~~	18	18.0	193.0	149.0
21	Greece	Angeliki Skarlatou	22	22.0	20	20.0	15	15.0	18	18.0	13	13.0	~~23~~	~~23.0~~	~~24~~	~~24.0~~	15	15.0	23	23.0	16	16.0	17	17.0	206.0	159.0
22	Latvia	Vita Matīse	18	18.0	19	19.0	17	17.0	22	22.0	20	20.0	13	13.0	23	23.0	18	18.0	20	20.0	~~24~~	~~24.0~~	~~23~~	~~23.0~~	217.0	170.0
23	Ukraine	Olha Maslivets	17	17.0	~~24~~	~~24.0~~	~~23~~	~~23.0~~	20	20.0	22	22.0	20	20.0	21	21.0	22	22.0	22	22.0	20	20.0	21	21.0	232.0	185.0
24	Bulgaria	Irina Konstantinova	20	20.0	~~25~~	~~25.0~~	22	22.0	15	15.0	25	25.0	22	22.0	22	22.0	23	23.0	~~26~~	~~26.0~~	22	22.0	22	22.0	244.0	193.0
25	Hungary	Luca Gádorfalvi	23	23.0	~~26~~	~~26.0~~	24	24.0	24	24.0	~~28~~	~~28.0~~	21	21.0	25	25.0	21	21.0	15	15.0	23	23.0	25	25.0	255.0	201.0
26	Brazil	Christina Forte	24	24.0	22	22.0	27	27.0	26	26.0	24	24.0	~~OCS~~	~~30.0~~	26	26.0	25	25.0	24	24.0	25	25.0	~~27~~	~~27.0~~	280.0	223.0
27	Cuba	Anayansi Pérez	26	26.0	~~28~~	~~28.0~~	19	19.0	23	23.0	27	27.0	24	24.0	27	27.0	27	27.0	~~28~~	~~28.0~~	27	27.0	26	26.0	282.0	226.0
28	Turkey	İlknur Akdoğan	~~DNF~~	~~30.0~~	27	27.0	~~28~~	~~28.0~~	28	28.0	26	26.0	25	25.0	28	28.0	28	28.0	27	27.0	28	28.0	24	24.0	299.0	241.0
29	Seychelles	Endra Ha-Tiff	27	27.0	~~29~~	~~29.0~~	29	29.0	29	29.0	~~DSQ~~	~~30.0~~	26	26.0	29	29.0	29	29.0	29	29.0	29	29.0	28	28.0	314.0	255.0

Legend: DSQ – Disqualified; OCS – On the course side of the starting line;
Discard is crossed out and does not count for the overall result.

== Daily standings ==
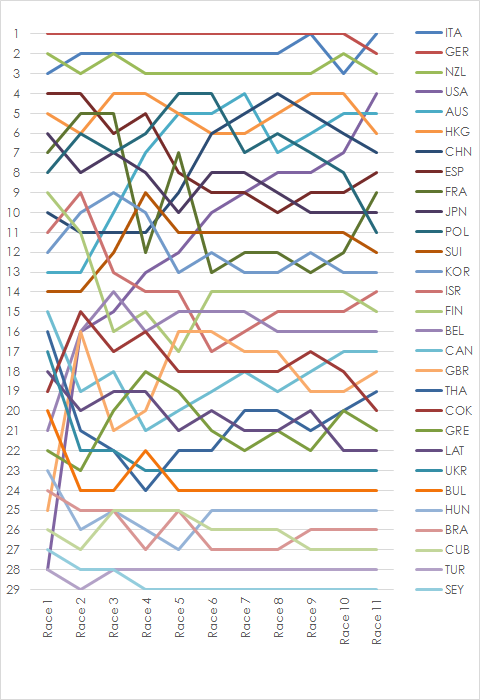
Graph showing the daily standings in the Women's Mistral One Design during the 2000 Summer Olympics
