= Michal Hein =

Israeli windsurfer

Michal Barel Hein (Hebrew: מיכל היין; born February 11, 1968) is an Israeli former Olympic windsurfer. She was born in Rehovot, Israel.

== Windsurfing career ==
Hein's club was Hapoel Tel Aviv, based in Tel Aviv, Israel.

She finished 10th at the World Championships in February 2000. Hein represented Israel at the 2000 Summer Olympics, aged 32, in Sydney, Australia, competing in Sailing--Women's Women's Mistral One Design/Windsurfer, and placed 14th. At the time of her Olympic competition, she stood at 5 feet 9 inches (175 cm) tall and weighed 130 pounds (59 kg).
