= Natacha Bibi =

Seychellois footballer and athlete (born 1984)

Personal information
- Full name: Natacha Diona Bibi
- Date of birth: 20 June 1984 (age 42)
- Position: Forward

Team information
- Current team: Caprera Calcio

Senior career*
Years	Team	Apps	(Gls)
2005–2007	Olympia Coast	9	(21)
2009–2011	La Digue Veuve	13	(32)
2015–2023	Mont Fleuri Rovers	4	(8)
2024	Saned	17	(2)
2024	Saned B	5	(6)
2024	Caprera Calcio	16	(31)

International career^{‡}
2015–	Seychelles	8	(13)
- * Club domestic league appearances and goals ‡ National team caps and goals as of 00:45, 6 July 2022 (UTC)

Natacha Diona Bibi (born 20 June 1984) is a Seychellois footballer and athlete who plays as a forward for Italian club Caprera Calcio and the Seychelles national team.

== Football career ==
=== Club ===
Bibi played for Olympia Coast in 2005; she helped them win the Seychelles Women's League in 2006 as top scorer with 14 goals. Bibi helped Olympia Coast to a domestic double in 2007, winning the league and the cup, in which she scored a hat-trick in the final.

In 2009, Bibi finishing runner-up in the Land Marine Cup with La Digue Veuve. In 2010, she helped her side win the domestic double, winning the league and scoring all four goals in the cup final. Bibi was nominated Player of the Year in 2011.

After having played for Lithuanian club FK Saned Joniskis, in December 2024, Bibi joined Italian club Caprera Calcio. She scored on her debut, in a 5–0 win over Castello.

=== International ===
Bibi represented the Seychelles women's national team at the 2015 Indian Ocean Island Games, scoring a hat-trick against the Maldives, and a brace against Madagascar. She scored a goal in a 4–1 friendly defeat to the United Arab Emirates on 15 September 2021.

On 20 February 2022, Bibi scored a second-half brace to help her side beat the Maldives 4–0 in a friendly tournament. In April 2022, Bibi took part in the 2022 FAS Tri-Nations Series with Seychelles; she scored a brace against hosts Singapore in the opening game on 4 April, in a 6–2 defeat. On 5 July 2022, she scored a hat-trick against Rodrigues in the 2022 Mauritius Triangular.

== Athletics career ==
Bibi won the women's 800 metres, 1500 metres and high jump at the 1999 Seychellois Championship. On 14 August 2000, Bibi beat Margaret Morel's 800 metres national record, clocking 2:16.85 at the 2000 African Southern Region Athletics Championships.

Bibi represented Seychelles at the 2001 African Junior Athletics Championships, winning bronze in the women's long jump; she also ran in the first round of the 800 meters. She won bronze in the long jump once again, at the 2019 Indian Ocean Island Games.

== Career statistics ==
=== International ===
As of match played 4 April 2022

Scores and results list Seychelles's goal tally first, score column indicates score after each Bibi goal.

List of international goals scored by Natacha Bibi
No.	Date	Venue	Opponent	Score	Result	Competition	Ref.
1	2 August 2015	Stade Baby-Larivière, Saint-André, Réunion	Maldives	1–0	4–1	2015 Indian Ocean Island Games	
2	2 August 2015	Stade Baby-Larivière, Saint-André, Réunion	Maldives	2–1	4–1	2015 Indian Ocean Island Games	
3	2 August 2015	Stade Baby-Larivière, Saint-André, Réunion	Maldives	3–1	4–1	2015 Indian Ocean Island Games	
4	20 February 2022	Stade Jean-Allane, Saint-Benoît, Réunion	Madagascar	1–0	2–8	2015 Indian Ocean Island Games	
5	20 February 2022	Stade Jean-Allane, Saint-Benoît, Réunion	Madagascar	2–7	2–8	2015 Indian Ocean Island Games	
6	18 February 2022	Theyab Awana Stadium, Dubai, United Arab Emirates	United Arab Emirates	1–2	1–4	Friendly	
7	20 February 2022	National Football Stadium, Malé, Maldives	Maldives	2–0	4–0	Friendly	
8	20 February 2022	National Football Stadium, Malé, Maldives	Maldives	4–0	4–0	Friendly	
9	4 April 2022	Jalan Besar Stadium, Kallang, Singapore	Singapore	1–2	2–6	2022 FAS Tri-Nations Series	
10	4 April 2022	Jalan Besar Stadium, Kallang, Singapore	Singapore	2–3	2–6	2022 FAS Tri-Nations Series	
11	5 July 2022	Mauritius Football Association Stadium, Quatre Bornes, Mauritius	Rodrigues	1–0	5–0	2022 Mauritius Triangular	
12	5 July 2022	Mauritius Football Association Stadium, Quatre Bornes, Mauritius	Rodrigues	2–0	5–0	2022 Mauritius Triangular	
13	5 July 2022	Mauritius Football Association Stadium, Quatre Bornes, Mauritius	Rodrigues	4–0	5–0	2022 Mauritius Triangular	
