= Elke Talma =

Seychellois swimmer

Personal information
- Nationality: Seychellois
- Born: 29 April 1977 (age 49)

Sport
- Sport: Swimming
- Strokes: Breaststroke
- Updated on 12 June 2015

Elke Sabina Talma (born 29 April 1977) is a Seychellois former swimmer.

At the 1992 Summer Olympics, Elke competed in the women's 100 metre breaststroke, 200 metre breaststroke and 200 metre individual medley where she recorded the slowest time in each event. Since retiring from competitive swimming, Talma now works as a research officer for the Marine Conservation Society Seychelles.
