= Denis Rose (athlete) =

Seychellois sprinter

Personal information
- Nationality: Seychellois
- Born: 26 October 1959 (age 66)

Sport
- Sport: Sprinting
- Event: 100 metres

Denis Rose (born 26 October 1959) is a Seychellois sprinter. He competed in the men's 100 metres at the 1984 Summer Olympics. Rose was the flag bearer for Seychelles in the opening ceremony.

Olympic Games
Preceded by Michael Pillay	Flagbearer for Seychelles; Los Angeles 1984	Succeeded by Roland Raforme
