= Danny Adeline =

Seychellois windsurfer (born 1963)

Personal information
- Full name: Hugh Jean Adeline
- Nationality: Seychellois
- Born: 7 October 1963 (age 61)

Sport
- Country: Seychelles
- Sport: Windsurfing

Hugh Jean "Danny" Adeline (born 7 October 1963) is a Seychellois windsurfer. He competed in the 1992 Summer Olympics.
