= Endra Ha-Tiff =

Seychellois windsurfer

Personal information
- Full name: Endra Nicette Ha-Tiff
- Nationality: Seychelles
- Born: 28 July 1976 (age 50)
- Height: 1.60 m (5 ft 3 in)

Sailing career
- Sport: Sailing
- Class: Mistral One Design Class

Endra Nicette Ha-Tiff (born 28 July 1976) is a Seychellois former windsurfer. Endra competed in the women's mistral at the 2000 Summer Olympics. The event consisted of eleven races and she finished overall in last position
