= Ned Azemia =

Seychellois hurdler (born 1997)

Ned Justeen Azemia
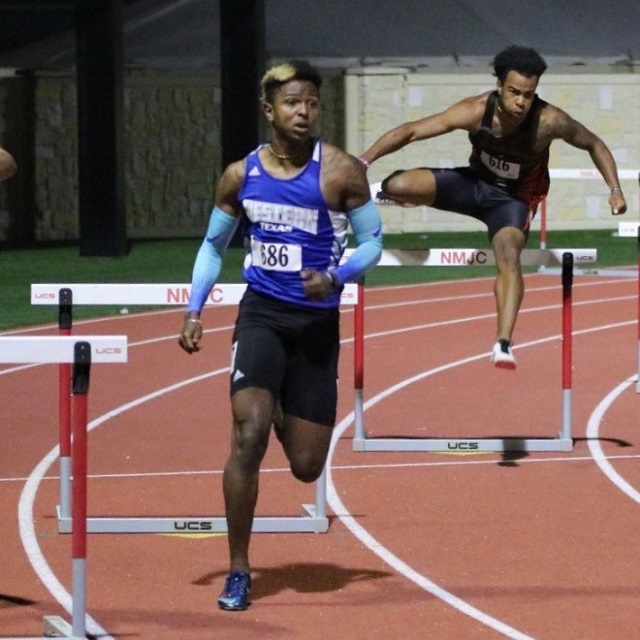

Personal information
- Nationality: Seychellois
- Born: 21 August 1997 (age 28)
- Height: 1.77 m (5 ft 10 in)
- Weight: 65 kg (143 lb)

Sport
- Sport: Track and field
- Events: 400 metres hurdles 400 metres
- University team: UTEP Miners

Achievements and titles
- Personal bests: 400 metres hurdles: 49.82; 400 metres: 47.77
Medal record
Representing Seychelles
African Youth Games
Bronze medal – third place	2014 Gaborone	400 metres hurdles

Ned Justeen Azemia (born 21 August 1997) is a Seychellois hurdler who specialises in the 400 metres hurdles. He is the current Seychellois record holder in the event. Azemia competed in the 2016 Summer Olympics in Rio de Janeiro in the 400 metres hurdles. He has also competed in two World Junior Championships, an African athletics championships and an African Youth Games. Azemia has also raced over the flat 400 metres distance.

== Competition ==
Azemia's debut at an international athletics competition was at the 2014 African Youth Games, where he won the bronze medal in the 400 metres hurdles with a time of 53.27 seconds. His placing at the African Youth Games qualified him for the 2014 World Junior Championships, where he competed in the 400 metres hurdles. He was disqualified from his heat and therefore eliminated from the competition.

He then competed at the 2014 African Championships in Athletics in the 400 metres hurdles. Azemia raced in heat two and ran a time of 55.72 seconds. He was 6.39 seconds slower than the heat winner, Nicholas Bett of Kenya. Azemia failed to qualify for the next round. Azemia also competed in the 4 × 100 metres relay as part of a Seychelles team. The team reached the final but didn't race in it.

Azemia competed at the IAAF World U20 Championships in July 2016 and was knocked out of the 400 metres hurdles in the semi-final round after his time of 51.64 seconds was not quick enough to qualify for the final. Earlier in the competition, he had run a Seychellois national junior record time of 51.50 seconds, to finish second in his heat and qualify for the semi-final round.

At the 2016 Summer Olympics, Azemia competed in the 400 metres hurdles. Azemia, who was the youngest Seychellois athlete at the Games, was drawn in heat three, a heat containing the London 2012 bronze medalist Javier Culson. In the race on 15 August 2016, Azemia ran a time of 50.74 seconds. Azemia's time was a personal best (beating his previous best of 51.09), and a new Seychellois national record. It was also a new Seychellois national junior record. After the race, Azemia told the Seychelles News Agency that "he knew going into the race that it would be difficult to qualify for the next round, but he was nevertheless happy with his performance". Seychelles Athletics Federation secretary Wilfred Adrienne said that, "It [the race] was great, an impressive performance for someone his age at such a high-level competition and we [the Seychelles Athletics Federation] are proud of him". Azemia's time was the 43rd-quickest out of 47 athletes. (Note: Nicholas Bett started the race but was disqualified.) Azemia's time was 0.97 seconds slower than the slowest athlete to progress to the next round and, therefore, he was eliminated.

He competed in the men's 400 metres hurdles event at the 2020 Summer Olympics.

Azemia competed at the collegiate level for the University of Texas at El Paso.
