= Michael Pillay =

Seychellois boxer (born 1955)

Personal information
- Nationality: Seychellois
- Born: 10 November 1955 (age 70)
- Height: 1.77 m (5 ft 9 1/2 in)
- Weight: 67 kg (148 lb)

Sport
- Sport: Boxing
- Weight class: Welterweight

Michael Pillay (born 10 November 1955) is a Seychellois former boxer and a founding member of the Seychelles Olympians Association.

Pillay competed in the men's welterweight category at the 1980 Olympic Games. In the first round he defeated Ole Svendsen of Denmark on points (4–1), but suffered a knock-out in round two while fighting against Mehmet Bogujevci from Yugoslavia. Pillay was the flag bearer for Seychelles in the opening ceremony.

Olympic Games
Preceded by N/A	Flagbearer for Seychelles; Moscow 1980	Succeeded by Denis Rose
