= Bessey de Létourdie =

Seychellois sprinter

Personal information
- Nationality: Seychellois
- Born: 15 July 1962
- Died: January 2006 (aged 43)

Sport
- Sport: Sprinting
- Event: 100 metres

Elizabeth "Bessey" de Létourdie (15 July 1962 – January 2006) was a Seychellois sprinter. She competed in the women's 100 metres at the 1980 Summer Olympics held in Moscow, Russia.
