= Seychelles at the Commonwealth Games =

- Flag of Seychelles
- CGF code: SEY
- CGA: Seychelles Olympic and Commonwealth Games Association
- Medals Ranked 49th: Gold 0 Silver 3 Bronze 4 Total 7

Commonwealth Games appearances (overview)
- 1990; 1994; 1998; 2002; 2006; 2010; 2014; 2018; 2022; 2026; 2030

Seychelles have sent a team to every Commonwealth Games since 1990, and have won seven medals, half of these in boxing.

== Medals ==
Games	Gold	Silver	Bronze	Total
1990 Auckland	0	0	0	0
1994 Victoria	0	0	1	1
1998 Kuala Lumpur	0	2	0	2
2002 Manchester	0	0	0	0
2006 Melbourne	0	0	2	2
2010 Delhi	0	1	0	1
2014 Glasgow	0	0	0	0
2018 Gold Coast	0	0	1	1
Total	0	3	4	7
