= Régis Tranquille =

Seychellois sprinter

Personal information
- Nationality: Seychellois
- Born: 17 January 1955 (age 71)

Sport
- Sport: Sprinting
- Event: 400 metres

Régis Tranquille (born 17 January 1955) is a Seychellois sprinter. He competed in the men's 400 metres at the 1980 Summer Olympics.
