= Andrique Allisop =

Seychellois boxer (born 1993)

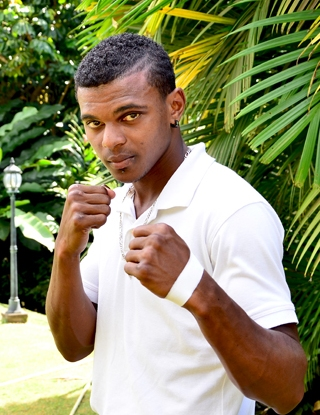

Personal information
- Nationality: Seychelles
- Born: 2 June 1993 (age 33) Victoria, Seychelles
- Height: 5 ft 7 in (170 cm)
- Weight: Flyweight

Boxing career

Andrique Allisop (born 2 June 1993) is a Seychellois amateur boxer. He was born in Victoria, the capital of Seychelles. He won sportsman of the year 2012 and 2014 in Seychelles

Allisop took up boxing at the age of 13.

Coached by Rival Payet, he represented Seychelles in the 2012 Summer Olympics in the lightweight division, losing in the round of 32.

Allisop qualified for the 2016 Summer Olympics in Rio de Janeiro, where he was defeated by Irish boxer David Joyce in the first round of the Lightweight event.

== Achievements ==
- 2014 – AIBA Africa Cup (East London, RSA) 1st place – 60 kg
- 2012 – AIBA African Olympic Qualification Tournament (Casablanca, MAR) 3rd place – 60 kg
- 2011 – Indian Ocean Islands Games (Roche Caiman, SEY) 1st place – 56 kg
- 2010 – Le Mamelles Tournament (Victoria, SEY) 2nd place – 57 kg
- 2010 – African Youth Games (Casablanca, MAR) 2nd place – 57 kg
- 2010 – Danas Pozniakas Youth Memorial Tournament (Vilnius, LTU) 3rd place
