= Anna Gałecka =

Polish windsurfer

Personal information
- Full name: Anna Elżbieta Gałecka
- Nationality: Poland
- Born: 18 April 1974 (age 50); Gdynia, Poland
- Height: 1.70 m (5 ft 7 in)
- Weight: 60 kg (132 lb)

Sport
- Sport: Windsurfing
- Club: Sopocki Klub Żeglarski Hestia

Anna Elżbieta Gałecka (born 18 April 1974 in Gdynia) is a Polish windsurfer. She competed in the 2000 Summer Olympics and finished 11th in the Women's Mistral One Design event.
