= Benjamin Lo-Pinto =

Seychellois swimmer (born 1976)

Personal information
- Full name: Benjamin Lo-Pinto
- National team: Seychelles
- Born: 11 March 1976 (age 50) Victoria, Seychelles
- Height: 1.80 m (5 ft 11 in)
- Weight: 74 kg (163 lb)

Sport
- Sport: Swimming
- Strokes: Backstroke
Medal record
Men's swimming
Representing the Seychelles
All-Africa Games
| Silver medal – second place | 1999 Johannesburg | 100 m backstroke |
| Bronze medal – third place | 1999 Johannesburg | 200 m backstroke |

Benjamin Lo-Pinto (born 11 March 1976) is a Seychellois former swimmer, who specialised in backstroke events. Lo-Pinto has collected two medals from the All-Africa Games, and later represented Seychelles at the 2000 Summer Olympics, where he became the nation's flag bearer in the opening ceremony.

Lo-Pinto established his swimming history for Seychelles at the 1999 All-Africa Games in Johannesburg, South Africa, where he earned a silver medal in the 100 m backstroke (59.64), and bronze in the 200 m backstroke (2:11.21). Because of his stellar performance during the Games, he was named the Sportsman of the Year by the Seychelles Olympic and Commonwealth Games Association.

At the 2000 Summer Olympics in Sydney, Lo-Pinto competed only in the men's 100 m backstroke. He achieved a FINA B-cut of 58.66 from the All-Africa Games. Swimming from start to finish in heat one, he raced to the second seed in 58.66, nearly a full second behind leader Alexandru Ivlev of Moldova. Lo-Pinto failed to advance into the semi-finals, as he placed forty-seventh overall in the prelims.

Olympic Games
| Preceded by Rival Cadeau | Flagbearer for Seychelles; Sydney 2000 | Succeeded by Allan Julie |
