= Guernsey at the Commonwealth Games =

- CG code: GGY (GUE used at these Games)
- CGA: Guernsey Commonwealth Games Association
- Website: guernseycga.org.gg
- Medals Ranked 43rd: Gold 1 Silver 5 Bronze 3 Total 9

Commonwealth Games appearances (overview)
- 1970; 1974; 1978; 1982; 1986; 1990; 1994; 1998; 2002; 2006; 2010; 2014; 2018; 2022; 2026; 2030

Guernsey has competed thirteen times in the Commonwealth Games to date, beginning in 1970.

== History ==
Guernsey first participated at the Games in 1970 in Edinburgh, Scotland.

== Medals ==
Games	Gold	Silver	Bronze	Total
1970 Edinburgh	0	0	0	0
1974 Christchurch	0	0	0	0
1978 Edmonton	0	0	0	0
1982 Brisbane	0	1	1	2
1986 Edinburgh	0	2	0	2
1990 Auckland	1	0	0	1
1994 Victoria	0	0	1	1
1998 Kuala Lumpur	0	0	0	0
2002 Manchester	0	0	0	0
2006 Melbourne	0	0	0	0
2010 Delhi	0	0	0	0
2014 Glasgow	0	0	0	0
2018 Gold Coast	0	0	0	0
2022 Birmingham	0	1	1	2
2026 Glasgow	0	1	0	1
Totals (15 entries)	1	5	3	9

Medals won:

- 1982 10m Air Rifle – Men – Silver

(bronze) Fullbore Rifle Queens Prize (Pair) – Open – Bronze

- 1986 (silver) Lawn Bowls Pairs – Women – Silver

(silver) Rapid Fire Pistol – Men – Silver

- 1990 (gold) Rapid Fire Pistol – Men – Gold
- 1994 (bronze) 25m Rapid Fire Pistol (Pair) – Men – Bronze
- 2022 (silver) Lawn Bowls Singles – Women – Silver

400m Hurdles – Men – Bronze

- 2026 (silver) Lawn Bowls Singles – Women – Silver
