= Tony Lespoir =

Seychellois canoeist

Tony Gill Lespoir (born 1 September 1976) is a Seychellois sprint canoeist who has competed since the mid-2000s. At the 2004 Summer Olympics in Athens, he was eliminated in the semifinals of the K-1 500 m event and the heats of the K-1 1000 m event. Four years later in Beijing, Lespoir was eliminated in the heats in both the K-1 500 m and the K-1 1000 m events.
