= Namibia at the Commonwealth Games =

- CG code: NAM
- CGA: Namibia National Olympic Committee
- Website: olympic.org.na
- Medals Ranked 29th: Gold 5 Silver 5 Bronze 17 Total 27

Commonwealth Games appearances (overview)
- 1994; 1998; 2002; 2006; 2010; 2014; 2018; 2022; 2026; 2030

Namibia has competed in eight Commonwealth Games, making its first appearance in Victoria 1994, and appearing in every subsequent Games to date.

== Medals ==
Games	Gold	Silver	Bronze	Total
1994 Victoria	1	0	1	2
1998 Kuala Lumpur	0	2	1	3
2002 Manchester	1	0	4	5
2006 Melbourne	1	0	1	2
2010 Delhi	0	1	2	3
2014 Glasgow	0	1	2	3
2018 Gold Coast	2	0	0	2
2022 Birmingham	0	0	4	4
2026 Glasgow	0	1	2	3
Totals (9 entries)	5	5	17	27

== See also ==
- All-time medal tally of Commonwealth Games
- Namibia
- Commonwealth Games Federation
