= Dominic Dugasse =

Seychellois judoka

Personal information
- Born: 19 April 1985 (age 40); Victoria, Seychelles
- Occupation: Judoka
- Height: 1.88 m (6 ft 2 in)
- Weight: 100 kg (220 lb)

Sport
- Country: Seychelles
- Sport: Judo
- Event: -100kg

Profile at external databases
- JudoInside.com: 70681
- Updated on 5 August 2012

Dominic Dugasse (born 19 April 1985) is a Seychellois judoka who competed in the -100 kg event at the 2012 Summer Olympics in London, where he lost in the first round of the event to Henk Grol of the Netherlands. He was the flag bearer for the Seychelles during the 2012 Summer Olympics opening ceremony.

In 2013, he was voted Sportsman of the Year at the Seychelles Sports Awards, the first time a judoka had won the honour.

Olympic Games
Preceded by Georgie Cupidon	Flagbearer for Seychelles; London 2012	Succeeded by Rodney Govinden
