= Rodney Govinden =

Seychellois sailor

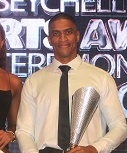
- Govinden in 2020

Personal information
- Born: 13 September 1984 (age 41)

Sailing career
- Sport: Sailing
- Class: Men's laser

Rodney Govinden (born 13 September 1984) is a Seychellois sailor. He competed at the 2016 Summer Olympics in the men's Laser event, in which he placed 45th. He was the flag-bearer for Seychells at the 2016 Summer Olympics Parade of Nations.

He qualified to represent Seychelles at the 2020 Summer Olympics in the men's Laser event, where he placed 33rd.

Olympic Games
Preceded by Dominic Dugasse	Flagbearer for Seychelles; Rio de Janeiro 2016 Tokyo 2020; With: Felicity Passon	Succeeded by Khema Elizabeth; Dylan Sicobo
