= Jonathan Barbe =

Seychellois windsurfer (born 1977)

Personal information
- Nationality: Seychelles
- Born: 26 April 1977 (age 48)
- Height: 1.72 m (5 ft 7 1/2 in)
- Weight: 66 kg (146 lb)

Sport

Sailing career
- Class: Mistral One Design Class

Jonathan Barbe (born 26 April 1977) is a Seychellois former windsurfer and double Olympian.

Jonathan competed in the men's mistral at the 1996 Summer Olympics: The event consisted of nine races and he finished overall in 44th position Four years later, Barbe represented Seychelles again in the same event at the Sydney Olympics. The number of races was increased to eleven and he finished second from last in 35th position.

After retiring from competition, Jonathan became a sports coach.
