= Sierra Leone at the Commonwealth Games =

- CGF code: SLE
- CGA: National Olympic Committee of Sierra Leone
- Website: nocsl.org
- Medals Ranked 0th: Gold 0 Silver 0 Bronze 0 Total 0

Commonwealth Games appearances (overview)
- 1958; 1962; 1966; 1970; 1974; 1978; 1982–1986; 1990; 1994; 1998; 2002; 2006; 2010; 2014; 2018; 2022; 2026; 2030

Sierra Leone have competed in ten Commonwealth Games, first attending in 1958. They did not attend in 1962 or 1974, then took a twelve-year break between 1978 and 1990. They have not yet won a Commonwealth Games medal.
