= Rival Cadeau =

Seychellois boxer (born 1964)

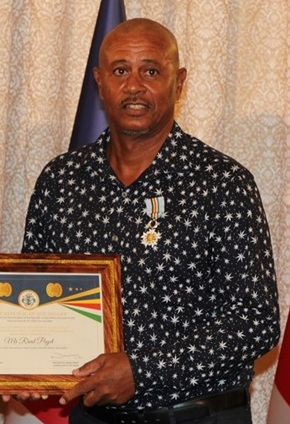
- Cadeau-Payet in 2024

Personal information
- Born: 13 May 1964 (age 62)

Sport
- Sport: Boxing
Medal record
Men's amateur boxing
Representing Seychelles
Commonwealth Games
Bronze medal – third place	1994 Victoria	Light middleweight
All-Africa Games
Silver medal – second place	1995 Harare	Light middleweight

Rival Cadeau-Payet (born 13 May 1964) is a former light middleweight boxer from Seychelles. He represented his country at the 1990 Commonwealth Games, 1992 Summer Olympics, 1994 Commonwealth Games (in which he won a bronze medal), 1995 All-Africa Games (in which he won silver) and at the 1996 Summer Olympics.

In 2024 he received a Seychelles Medal of Honour.

Olympic Games
Preceded by Roland Raforme	Flagbearer for Seychelles; Atlanta 1996	Succeeded by Benjamin Lo-Pinto
