= Margaret Morel =

Seychellois middle-distance runner (1958–2019)

Personal information
- Nationality: Seychellois
- Born: 19 February 1958
- Died: 16 March 2019 (aged 61)

Sport
- Sport: Middle-distance running
- Event: 800 metres

Margaret Morel (19 February 1958 – 16 March 2019) was a Seychellois middle-distance runner. She competed in the women's 800 metres at the 1980 Summer Olympics. She was the first woman to represent the Seychelles at the Olympics.
