= Albert Marie =

Seychellois long-distance runner (born 1957)

Personal information
- Nationality: Seychellois
- Born: 3 March 1957 (age 69)

Sport
- Sport: Long-distance running
- Events: Marathon, 10,000 m, 3000 m steeplechase

Albert Marie (born 3 March 1957) is a Seychellois long-distance runner. He competed in the marathon at the 1980 Summer Olympics. In 1988, Marie ran his personal best time in the marathon, finishing in 2:25:48.

== International competitions ==
Year	Competition	Venue	Position	Event	Notes
Representing Seychelles
1980	Olympic Games	Moscow, Soviet Union	31st (h)	3000 m steeplechase	9:19.62
1984	Olympic Games	Los Angeles, United States	41st (h)	10,000 m	32:04.11
1984	Olympic Games	Los Angeles, United States	33rd (h)	3000 m steeplechase	9:32.30
