= Roland Raforme =

Seychellois boxer (born 1966)

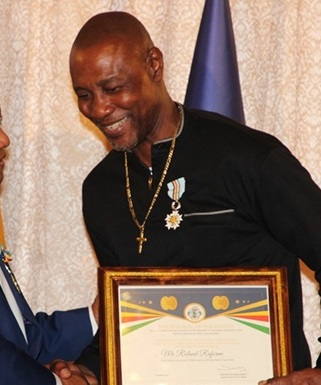
- Raforme in 2024

Personal information
- Nationality: Seychellois
- Born: 3 November 1966 (age 59)
- Height: 1.92 m (6 ft 3 1/2 in)
- Weight: 81 kg (179 lb)

Sport
- Sport: Boxing
- Weight class: Light heavyweight Heavyweight
Medal record
Commonwealth Games
Silver medal – second place	1998 Kuala Lumpur	Heavyweight
All-Africa Games
Bronze medal – third place	1991 Cairo	Light-heavyweight
Bronze medal – third place	1995 Harare	Light-heavyweight

Roland Bernard Raforme (born 5 April 1966) is a Seychellois former boxer and double Olympian.

Representing Seychelles in the men's light heavyweight category at the 1992 Summer Olympics, Raforme reached the quarter-finals where he was beaten by the Hungarian boxer Zoltán Béres on points. Returning four years later to compete in the same event at the Atlanta Games, he was stopped in the first round by Troy Amos-Ross. Raforme was more successful in the 1998 Commonwealth Games where he won a silver medal in the men's heavyweight category after losing in the final to Mark Simmons from Canada. Previously, he represented Seychelles at the 1994 Commonwealth Games.

Raforme was the flag bearer for Seychelles in the 1992 Summer Olympics opening ceremony.

Olympic Games
Preceded by Denis Rose	Flagbearer for Seychelles; Barcelona 1992	Succeeded by Rival Cadeau
