= Allan Julie =

Seychellois sailor

Personal information
- Nationality: Seychelles
- Born: 23 March 1977 (age 49) Victoria, Seychelles
- Height: 1.80 m (5 ft 11 in)
- Weight: 80 kg (176 lb)

Sailing career
- Sport: Sailing
- Club: Seychelles Yachting; Association
- Classes: Laser, Finn
Medal record
Men's sailing
Representing Seychelles
All-Africa Games
Gold medal – first place	2007 Algiers	Laser

Allan Julie (born 23 March 1977) is a Laser and Finn sailor from the Seychelles. Julie is a five-time Olympian, and a gold medalist in the same sailing class at the 2011 All-Africa Games in Maputo, Mozambique.

== Career ==
Julie made his official debut for the 1996 Summer Olympics in Atlanta, Georgia, where he competed in the open laser class. He placed thirty-seventh out of fifty-six sailors in the preliminary races, with a net score of 305 points. At the 2000 Summer Olympics in Sydney, Julie achieved his best result in sailing, when he finished twenty-eighth in the same class, lowering his score to 203 net points.

At the 2004 Summer Olympics in Athens, Julie became the nation's flag bearer in the opening ceremony for being the most experienced member. He placed twentieth out of forty-two sailors in the open laser class by six points larger of his record from Finland's Roope Suomalainen, attaining his best net score of 166.

Twelve years after competing in his first Olympics, Julie qualified for his fourth Seychellois team, as a 31-year-old, at the 2008 Summer Olympics in Beijing, by finishing forty-ninth and obtaining a place from the 2007 ISAF Sailing World Championships in Cascais, Portugal. He placed thirty-second out of forty-three sailors in the preliminary races of the men's Laser class, by three points shorter of his record from Guatemala's Juan Ignacio Maegli, with a net score of 203 points.

Julie missed out on qualifying for the 2012 Summer Olympics, but four years later he switched to the Finn boat and managed to qualify after only starting in his new boat two weeks before the final African Olympic qualification regatta. In the Finn class at the 2016 Olympics Julie finished 23rd.

Throughout his career Julie has been named Seychelles Sportsman of the Year a record six times

Olympic Games
Preceded by Benjamin Lo-Pinto	Flagbearer for Seychelles; Athens 2004	Succeeded by Georgie Cupidon
