= Seychelles Olympic and Commonwealth Games Association =

National Olympic Committee

- Country: Seychelles
- Code: SEY
- Recognized: 1979
- Continental Association: ANOCA
- Headquarters: Victoria
- President: Antonio Gopal
- Secretary General: Alain Alcindor
- Website: socga.com

The Seychelles Olympic and Commonwealth Games Association (IOC code: SEY) is the National Olympic Committee representing Seychelles in Olympic, Youth Olympic and Asian Games. It was created in 1979. As the name suggests, the body is also responsible for the Seychelles participation in the Commonwealth Games and Youth Games as the local Commonwealth Games Association.

== Presidents of Committee ==
- 1982–1991 – John Mascarenhas
- 1992–present – Antonio Gopal

== See also ==
- Seychelles at the Olympics
- Seychelles at the Commonwealth Games
- Sport in Seychelles
