= Flag of Seychelles =

Republic of Seychelles
- Use: National flag and ensign
- Proportion: 1:2
- Adopted: 8 January 1996; 30 years ago
- Design: Five oblique bands of blue, yellow, red, white, and green radiating from the bottom of the hoist side.
- Designed by: Philip Uzice
- Use: President's flag

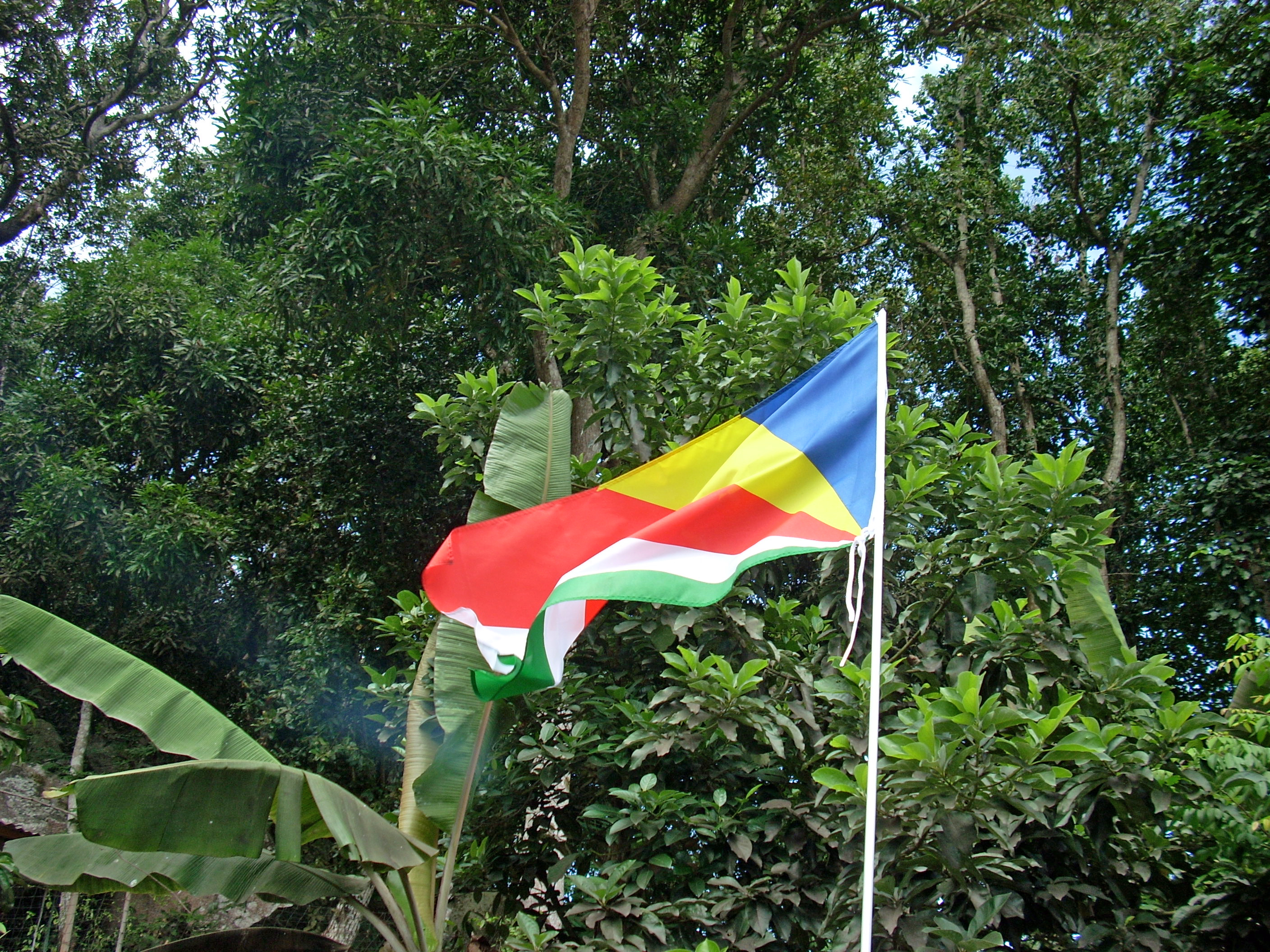
Flying flag of Seychelles

The national flag of Seychelles (drapeau national des Seychelles) was adopted on 8 January 1996. The current flag is the third used by the country since its independence from the United Kingdom on 29 June 1976. The colours used in the current flag are the official colours of two of the country's major political parties: the Seychelles People's United Party and the Seychelles Democratic Party.

== Description ==
This unique flag consists of five different oblique coloured bands (blue, yellow, red, white, and green) starting from one end and diverging towards the other end. The bands symbolise a dynamic new country moving into the future. The colour blue depicts the sky and the sea that surrounds the Seychelles. Yellow is for the sun which gives light and life, red symbolises the people and their determination to work for the future in unity and love, while the white band represents social justice and harmony. The green depicts the land and natural environment.

=== Colours ===
The red, white and green are the same shades used as the official colours by the United Seychelles political party, while the blue and yellow represent the Seychelles Democratic Party, which was in charge of the country from 1970 to 1977.

Color scheme	Blue	Yellow	Red	White	Green
Pantone	294	122	1795	–	356
RAL	5010	1016	3028	9016	6029
CMYK	100-55-0-47	0-14-66-1	0-84-84-16	0-0-0-0	100-0-53-52
HEX	#002F6C	#FED141	#D92323	#FFFFFF	#007A33
RGB	0-61-136	252-217-85	215-35-35	255-255-255	0-123-58

Flag construction sheet

== History ==
The original flag was adopted after independence on 29 June 1976. It had alternating blue and red triangles. The flag was very similar to the Australasian United Steam Navigation Company's flag, whose ships regularly visited the islands of Seychelles in the early 20th century. and similar to the Seychelles Democratic Party's flag.

In 1977, when president James Mancham was overthrown by France-Albert René, the old flag was abolished and the red, white and green flag based on the flag of the Seychelles People's United Party came into use, which had a distinct wavy white stripe. The only significant difference between the national flag and SPUP's flag was the depiction of the sun in the party's flag which was not used in the country's flag. When the party lost the majority in the elections, other parties demanded a change in the flag which led to a parliamentary approval of a new proposed design.

=== 1903–1976 ===
Flag from 1903 to 1961
58 years of use
Badge designed by Major-General Charles George Gordon. Prior to 1903, Seychelles was administered as a dependency of Mauritius

Flag from 1961 to 1976
15 years of use
Badge designed by Mrs. Patricia McEwen of Toronto, Canada

Governor's flag from 1903 to 1961

Governor's flag from 1961 to 1976

=== 1976–1996 ===
Flag from 1976 to 1977
1 year of use

Flag from 1977 to 1996
19 years of use

President's flag from 1976 to 1977

== See also ==
- History of Seychelles
