= Commonwealth Games =

Multi-sport event involving athletes from the Commonwealth of Nations

- 1930; 1934; 1938; 1950; 1954; 1958; 1962; 1966; 1970; 1974; 1978; 1982; 1986; 1990; 1994; 1998; 2002; 2006; 2010; 2014; 2018; 2022; 2026; 2030
- Archery; Athletics; Badminton; Basketball; Beach Volleyball; Boxing; Cricket; Cycling; Diving; Gymnastics; Hockey; Judo; Lawn bowls; Netball; Rowing; Rugby sevens; Squash; Swimming; Shooting; Synchronised swimming; Table tennis; Tennis; Triathlon; Weightlifting; Wrestling

The Commonwealth Games (Note: Which also refers itself as the Comm Games.) is a quadrennial international multi-sport event that brings together athletes from across the Commonwealth of Nations, a political association comprising the majority of former territories of the British Empire. First held as the British Empire Games in 1930, the event has evolved through several name changes, reflecting the changing geopolitical landscape and gradual decolonisation of the Empire. It was known as the British Empire Games until 1950, the British Empire and Commonwealth Games until 1966, and the British Commonwealth Games until 1974. Since the 1978 edition, the event has been officially known as the Commonwealth Games, a name that reflects its modern identity while maintaining its historic connection to Britain. The games are also referred to as the Friendly Games. The Games, one of the oldest multi-sports events outside of the modern Olympic Games, directly inspired similar events such as Jeux de la Francophonie and the Lusofonia Games for former French and Portuguese territories respectively.

The Games is overseen by Commonwealth Sport, which determines the sporting programme and awards hosting rights. The event upholds its unique traditions, such as the Baton Relay and the ceremonial hoisting of the Commonwealth Games flag. It is distinguished from other international sporting competitions by its inclusivity and heritage. Athletes with a disability have been integrated as full team members since 2002, and in 2018, the Games became the first global multi-sport competition to offer equal medal events for men and women. By 2022, women's events outnumbered men's for the first time. In addition to mainstream Olympic sports, the Commonwealth Games includes disciplines such as netball, lawn bowls and squash, which enjoy particular popularity within the Commonwealth.

The origins of the Games lie in the Inter-Empire Championships of 1911, with Melville Marks Robinson playing a pivotal role in establishing the first official Games in Hamilton, Canada. Over time, associated events such as the Commonwealth Youth Games and the now-defunct Commonwealth Paraplegic Games have further expanded participation. Unlike the Olympics and other global competitions, the Commonwealth Games permit representation from fifteen Commonwealth Games Associations that are not sovereign states. These include the four Home Nations of the United Kingdom, the Crown Dependencies, several British Overseas Territories, Norfolk Island (Australia) and Niue (New Zealand). Notably, despite being non-sovereign, Bermuda, British Virgin Islands and Cayman Islands are recognised as independent National Olympic Committees by the International Olympic Committee.

To date, twenty cities in nine countries have hosted the Games. Auckland, Edinburgh and Glasgow have hosted twice. The most recent edition is currently being held in Glasgow in 2026. Originally, the 2026 Commonwealth Games were awarded to Victoria in Australia, but cost concerns led to the state's withdrawal. Subsequently, Glasgow was confirmed as the replacement host city. The current Games are markedly smaller in scale, featuring only ten sports. As part of a settlement agreement, the Victorian government will provide over £2 million to the Glasgow organisers.The 2030 Commonwealth Games (which will be both the XXIV Games and the Centenary Games) had been awarded to Ahmedabad, India.

== History ==
A sporting competition bringing together the members of the British Empire was first proposed by John Astley Cooper in 1891, five years before the first modern first modern Olympic Games, who wrote letters and articles for several periodicals suggesting a "Pan Brittanic, Pan Anglican Contest every four years as a means of increasing goodwill and understanding of the British Empire." John Astley Cooper Committees were formed in Australia, New Zealand and South Africa to promote the idea and inspired Pierre de Coubertin to start the international Olympic Games movement.

In 1911, an Inter-Empire Championship was held alongside the Festival of Empire, at The Crystal Palace in London to celebrate the coronation of George V, and were championed by The Earl of Plymouth and Lord Desborough. Teams from Australasia (Australia and New Zealand), Canada, South Africa, and the United Kingdom competed in events for athletics, boxing, swimming and wrestling. Canada won the championships and was presented with a silver cup (gifted by Lord Lonsdale) which was 2 feet 6 inches (76 cm) high and weighed 340 ounces (9.6 kg). A correspondent of the Auckland Star criticised the Games, calling them a "grievous disappointment" that were "not worthy of the title of 'Empire Sports'".

While planning for the 1928 Summer Olympics in Amsterdam, Amateur Athletic Union of Canada executive J. Howard Crocker spoke with journalist Melville Marks Robinson of The Hamilton Spectator, about hosting an international sporting event in Canada. Robinson proposed and lobbied to host what became the British Empire Games in Hamilton, Ontario, in 1930. Robinson then served as the manager of the Canadian track and field team for the 1930 British Empire Games.

Although there are 56 sovereign states that are members of the Commonwealth of Nations, there are 74 active Commonwealth Games Associations.They are divided into six regions (Africa, the Americas, the Caribbean, Europe, Asia and Oceania) and each has a similar function to the National Olympic Committees in relation to their countries or territories. In some, like India and South Africa, the CGA functions are assumed by their NOCs.

Only six national federations have participated in every Commonwealth Games: Australia, Canada, England, New Zealand, Scotland and Wales. Of these six, Australia, England, Canada and New Zealand have each won at least one gold medal in every Games. Australia has been the highest-achieving team for thirteen editions of the Games, England for seven and Canada for one. These three teams also top the all-time Commonwealth Games medal table in that order.

=== Editions ===
==== British Empire Games (1930–1950) ====
The 1930 British Empire Games were the first of what later became known as the Commonwealth Games, and were held in Hamilton, Ontario, Canada from 16 to 23 August 1930 and opened by Lord Willingdon. Eleven countries: Australia, Bermuda, British Guyana, Canada, England, Northern Ireland, Newfoundland, New Zealand, Scotland, South Africa and Wales, sent a total of 400 athletes to compete in athletics, boxing, lawn bowls, rowing, swimming and diving and wrestling. The opening and closing ceremonies as well as athletics took place at Civic Stadium. The cost of the Games was $97,973. Women competed in only the aquatic events. Canadian triple jumper Gordon Smallacombe won the first ever gold medal in the history of the Games.

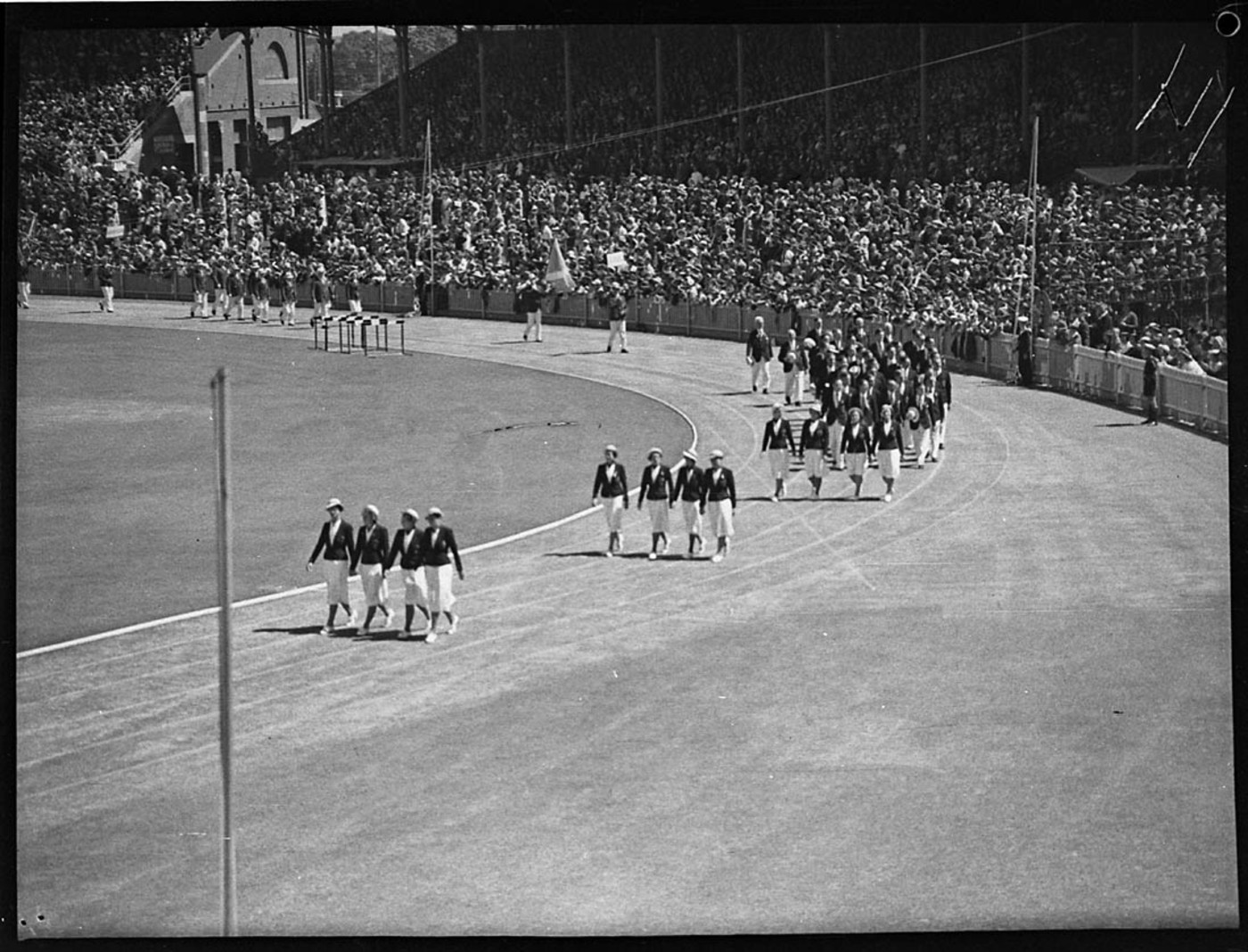
Opening ceremony of the 1938 British Empire Games at the Sydney Cricket Ground.

The 1934 British Empire Games were the second of what are now known as the Commonwealth Games, held in London, England. The host city was London, with the main venue at Wembley Park, although the track cycling events were in Manchester. The 1934 Games had originally been awarded to Johannesburg, but were given to London instead because of serious concerns about prejudice against Asian and black athletes in South Africa. The affiliation of Irish athletes at the 1934 Games representation remains unclear but there was no official Irish Free State team. Sixteen national teams took part, including new participants Hong Kong, India, Jamaica, Southern Rhodesia and Trinidad and Tobago.

The 1938 British Empire Games were the third British Empire Games, which were held in Sydney, New South Wales, Australia. It was timed to coincide with Sydney's sesqui-centenary (150 years since the foundation of British settlement in Australia). Held in the Southern Hemisphere for the first time, the III Games opening ceremony took place at the famed Sydney Cricket Ground in front of 40,000 spectators. Fifteen nations participated down under at the Sydney Games involving a total of 464 athletes and 43 officials. Fiji and Ceylon made their debuts. Seven sports were featured in the Sydney Games – athletics, boxing, cycling, lawn bowls, rowing, swimming and diving and wrestling.

The 1950 British Empire Games were the fourth edition and were held in Auckland, New Zealand, after a twelve-year gap from the third edition of the games. The fourth games were originally awarded to Montreal, Canada and were to be held in 1942, but were cancelled due to the Second World War. The opening ceremony at Eden Park was attended by 40,000 spectators, while nearly 250,000 people attended the Auckland Games. Twelve countries sent a total of 590 athletes to Auckland. Malaya and Nigeria made their first appearances.

==== British Empire and Commonwealth Games (1954–1966) ====
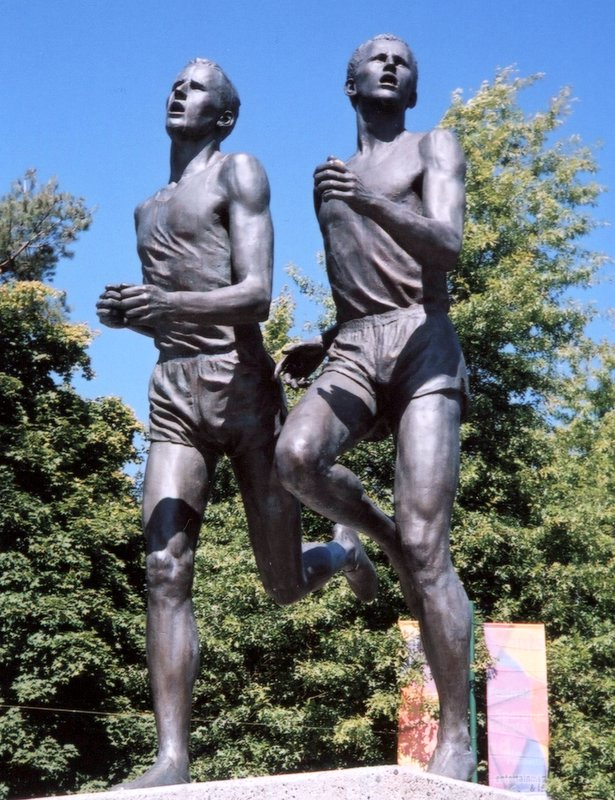
Statue in Vancouver commemorating the "Miracle Mile" between Roger Bannister and John Landy

The fifth edition of the Games, the 1954 British Empire and Commonwealth Games, were held in Vancouver, British Columbia, Canada. This was the first event since the name change from British Empire Games took effect in 1952, the same year of Queen Elizabeth II's reign. The fifth edition of the Games placed Vancouver on a world stage and featured memorable sporting moments as well as outstanding entertainment, technical innovation and cultural events. The 'Miracle Mile', as it became known, saw both the gold medallist, Roger Bannister of England and silver medallist John Landy of Australia, run sub-four-minute races in an event that was televised live across the world for the first time. Northern Rhodesia and Pakistan made their debuts and both performed well, winning eight and six medals respectively.

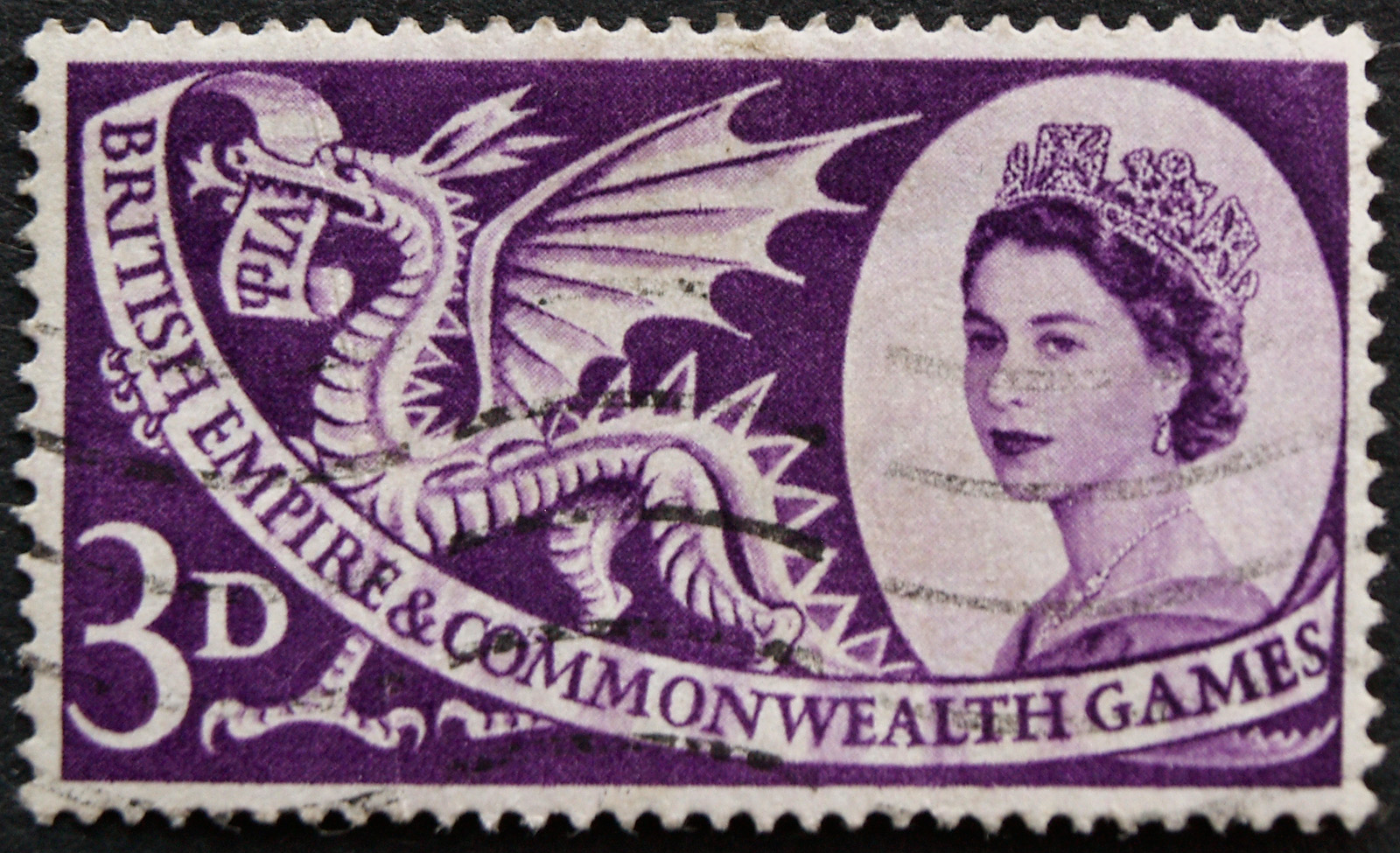
3 pence British stamp with theme of 1958 British Empire and Commonwealth Games, Cardiff, Wales

The 1958 British Empire and Commonwealth Games were held in Cardiff, Wales. The sixth edition of the games marked the largest sporting event ever held in Wales and it was the smallest country ever to host a British Empire and Commonwealth Games. Cardiff had to wait twelve years longer than originally scheduled to become host of the Games, as the 1946 event was cancelled because of the Second World War. The Cardiff Games introduced the Queen's Baton Relay, which has been conducted as a prelude to every British Empire and Commonwealth Games ever since. Thirty-five nations sent a total of 1,122 athletes and 228 officials to the Cardiff Games and 23 countries and dependencies won medals, including for the first time, Singapore, Ghana, Kenya and the Isle of Man. In the run up to the Cardiff games, many leading sports stars including Stanley Matthews, Jimmy Hill and Don Revie were signatories in a letter to The Times on 17 July 1958 deploring the presence of white-only South African sports, opposing 'the policy of apartheid' in international sport and defending 'the principle of racial equality which is embodied in the Declaration of the Olympic Games'.

The 1962 British Empire and Commonwealth Games were held in Perth, Western Australia. Thirty-five countries sent a total of 863 athletes and 178 officials to Perth. Jersey was among the medal winners for the first time, while British Honduras, Dominica, Papua and New Guinea and St Lucia all made their inaugural Games appearances. Aden also competed by special invitation. Sarawak, North Borneo and Malaya competed for the last time, before taking part in 1966 under the Malaysian flag. In addition, Rhodesia and Nyasaland competed in the Games as an entity for the first and only time.

The 1966 British Empire and Commonwealth Games were held in Kingston, Jamaica. This was the first time that the Games had been held outside the so-called White Dominions. Thirty-four nations (including South Arabia) competed in the Kingston Games, sending a total of 1,316 athletes and officials.

==== British Commonwealth Games (1970–1974) ====
The 1970 British Commonwealth Games were held in Edinburgh, Scotland. This was the first time the name British Commonwealth Games was adopted, the first time metric units rather than imperial units were used in events, the first time the games were held in Scotland and also the first time that HM Queen Elizabeth II attended in her capacity as Head of the Commonwealth.

The 1974 British Commonwealth Games were held in Christchurch, New Zealand. The event was officially named The Friendly Games, and was also the first edition to feature a theme song. Following the massacre of Israeli athletes at the 1972 Munich Olympics, the tenth games at Christchurch were the first multi-sport event to place the safety of participants and spectators as its uppermost requirement. Security guards surrounded the athletes' village and there was an exceptionally high-profile police presence. Only 22 countries succeeded in winning medals from the total haul of 374 medals on offer, but first time winners included Western Samoa, Lesotho and Swaziland (since 2018 named Eswatini). The theme song for the 1974 British Commonwealth Games was called "Join Together".

==== Commonwealth Games (1978–1998) ====
The 1978 Commonwealth Games were held in Edmonton, Alberta, Canada. This event was the first to bear the current day name of the Commonwealth Games, and also marked a new high as almost 1,500 athletes from 46 countries took part. They were boycotted by Nigeria in protest against New Zealand's sporting contacts with apartheid-era South Africa, as well as by Uganda in protest at alleged Canadian hostilities toward the government of Idi Amin.

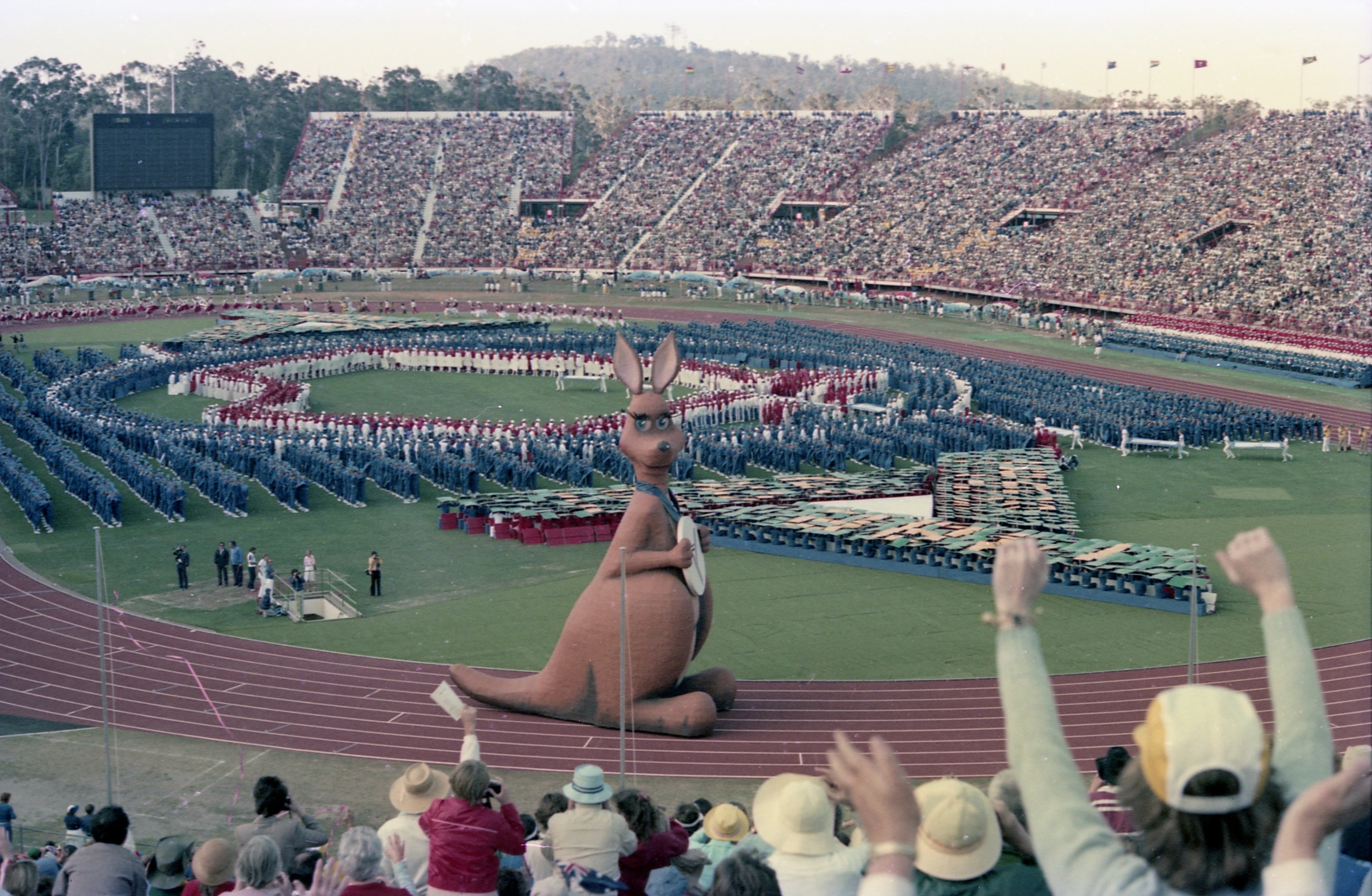
Opening ceremony of the 1982 Commonwealth Games at Brisbane, Australia

The 1982 Commonwealth Games were held in Brisbane, Queensland, Australia. Forty-six nations participated in the Brisbane Games with a new record total of 1,583 athletes and 571 officials. As hosts, Australia headed the medal table leading the way ahead of England, Canada, Scotland and New Zealand respectively. Zimbabwe made its first appearance at the Games, having earlier competed as Southern Rhodesia and as part of Rhodesia and Nyasaland. The theme song for the 1982 Commonwealth Games was called "You're Here To Win".

The 1986 Commonwealth Games were held in Edinburgh, Scotland and were the second Games to be held in Edinburgh. Participation at the 1986 Games was affected by a boycott by 32 African, Asian and Caribbean nations in protest at British Prime Minister Margaret Thatcher's refusal to condemn sporting contacts of apartheid era South Africa in 1985, but the Games rebounded and continued to grow thereafter. Twenty-six nations did attend the second Edinburgh Games, and sent a total of 1,662 athletes and 461 officials. The theme song for the 1986 Commonwealth Games was called "Spirit Of Youth".

The 1990 Commonwealth Games were held in Auckland, New Zealand. They were the fourteenth Commonwealth Games, the third to be hosted by New Zealand and Auckland's second. A new record of 55 nations participated in the second Auckland Games, sending 2,826 athletes and officials. Pakistan returned to the Commonwealth in 1989 after withdrawing in 1972, and competed in the 1990 Games after an absence of twenty years. The theme song for the 1990 Commonwealth Games was called "This Is The Moment".

The 1994 Commonwealth Games were held in Victoria, British Columbia, Canada. This event was the fourth to take place in Canada. The games marked another point of South Africa's return to the sporting atmosphere following the apartheid era, and over thirty years since the country last competed in the Games in 1958. Namibia made its Commonwealth Games debut following its independence from South Africa in 1990. It was also Hong Kong's last appearance at the games before the transfer of sovereignty from Britain to China. Sixty-three nations sent 2,557 athletes and 914 officials. The theme song for the 1994 Commonwealth Games was called "Let Your Spirit Take Flight".

The 1998 Commonwealth Games were held in Kuala Lumpur, Malaysia. For the first time in its 68-year history, the Commonwealth Games were held in Asia. The event was also the first Games to feature team sports (cricket, rugby 7s, netball and field hockey) along with ten pin bowling and squash– an overwhelming success that added large numbers to both participant and TV audience numbers. A new record of 70 countries sent a total of 5,065 athletes and officials to the Kuala Lumpur Games. The top five countries in the medal standing were Australia, England, Canada, Malaysia (who made their best games' performance until that date) and South Africa. Nauru also achieved an impressive haul of three gold medals. Cameroon, Mozambique, Kiribati and Tuvalu debuted. The theme song for the 1998 Commonwealth Games was called "Forever As One".

==== During the 21st century ====
The 2002 Commonwealth Games were held in Manchester, England. The event was hosted in England for the first time since 1934 and hosted to coincide with the Golden Jubilee of Elizabeth II, head of the Commonwealth. In terms of sports and events, the 2002 event was until the 2010 edition the largest Commonwealth Games in history featuring 281 events across 17 sports. The final medal tally was led by Australia, followed by host England and Canada. The 2002 Commonwealth Games had set a new benchmark for hosting the Commonwealth Games and for cities wishing to bid for them with a heavy emphasis on legacy. The theme song for the 2002 Commonwealth Games was called "Where My Heart Will Take Me".

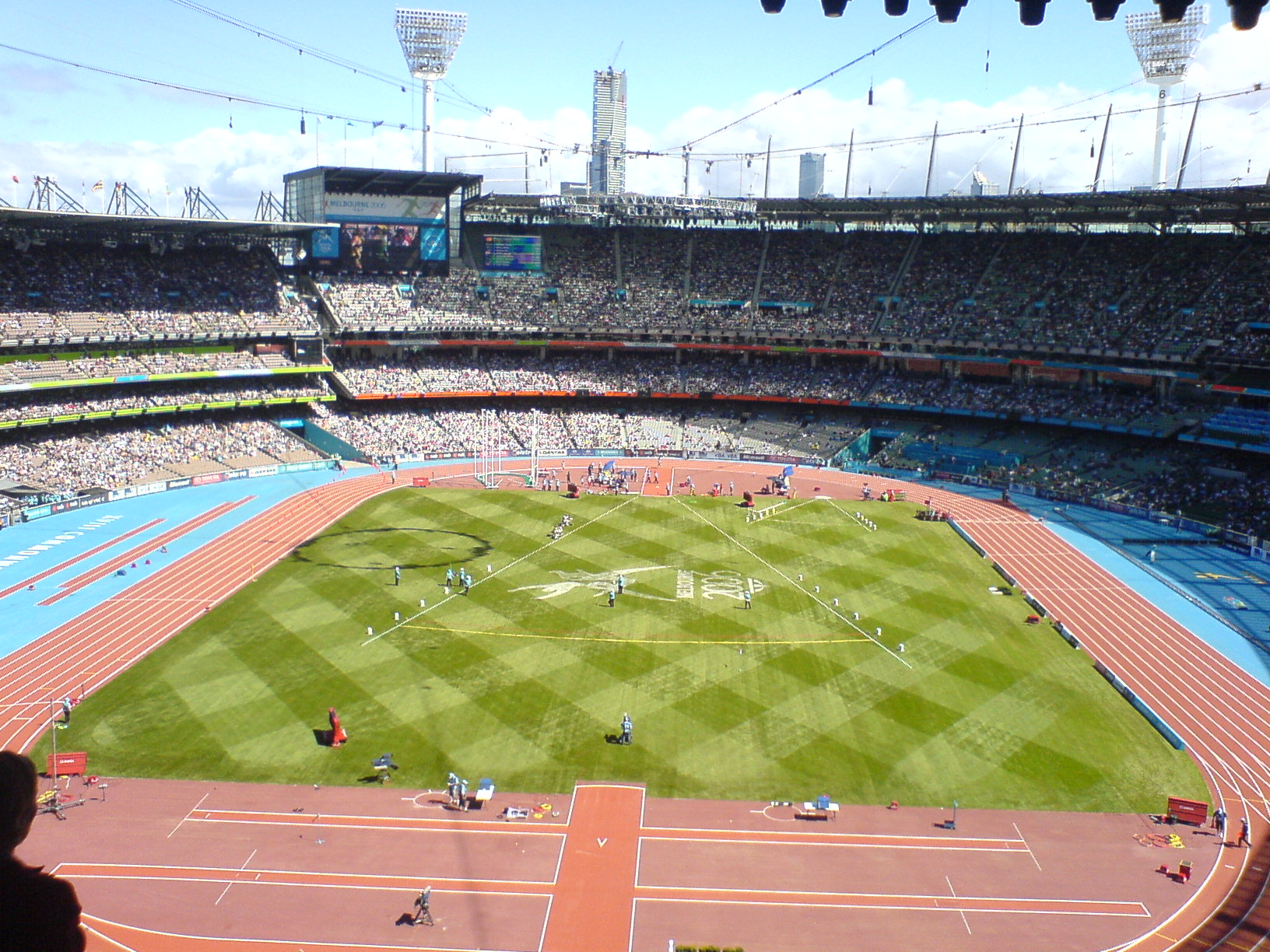
Athletics at the Melbourne Cricket Ground (MCG) during the 2006 Commonwealth Games, Melbourne

The 2006 Commonwealth Games were held in Melbourne, Victoria, Australia. The only difference between the 2006 games and the 2002 games was the absence of Zimbabwe, which withdrew from the Commonwealth of Nations after being suspended by the organization in 2002. For the first time in the history of the Games the Queen's Baton visited every single Commonwealth nation and territory taking part in the Games, a journey of 180,000 kilometres (110,000 mi). Over 4000 athletes took part in the sporting competitions. Again the Top 3 on the medal table is Australia, followed by England and Canada. The theme song for the 2006 Commonwealth Games was called "Together We Are One".

The 2010 Commonwealth Games were held in Delhi, India. The Games cost $11 billion and were the most expensive Commonwealth Games ever. It was the first time that the Commonwealth Games was held in India, also the first time that a Commonwealth republic hosted the games and the second time it was held in Asia after Kuala Lumpur, Malaysia in 1998. A total of 6,081 athletes from 71 Commonwealth nations and dependencies competed in 21 sports and 272 events. The final medal tally was led by Australia. The host nation India achieved its best performance ever in any sporting event, finishing second overall. Rwanda made its Games debut. The theme song for the 2010 Commonwealth Games was called "Live, Rise, Ascend, Win".

The 2014 Commonwealth Games were held in Glasgow, Scotland. These games were the largest multi-sport event ever held in Scotland with around 4,950 athletes from 71 different nations and territories competing in 18 different sports, outranking the 1970 and 1986 Commonwealth Games in Edinburgh, capital city of Scotland. Usain Bolt competed in the 4×100 metres relay of the 2014 Commonwealth Games and set a Commonwealth Games record with his teammates. The Games received acclaim for their organisation, attendance, and the public enthusiasm of the people of Scotland, with the CGF chief executive Mike Hooper hailing them as "the standout games in the history of the movement".

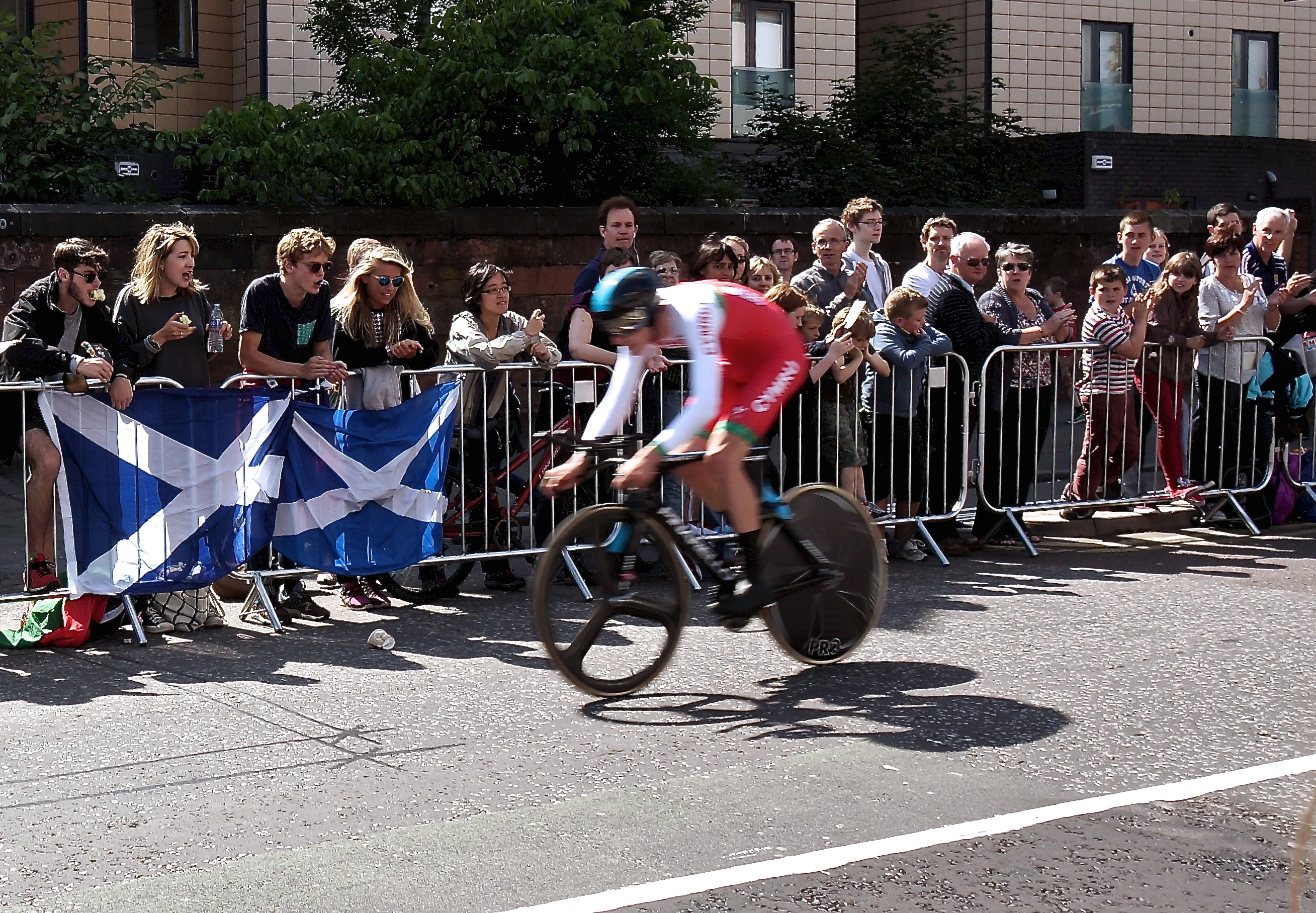
Cycling event during the 2014 Commonwealth Games hosted in Glasgow, Scotland

The 2018 Commonwealth Games were held in Gold Coast, Queensland, Australia, the fifth time Australia hosted the Games. There were an equal number of events for men and women, the first time in history that a major multi-sport event had equality in terms of events.

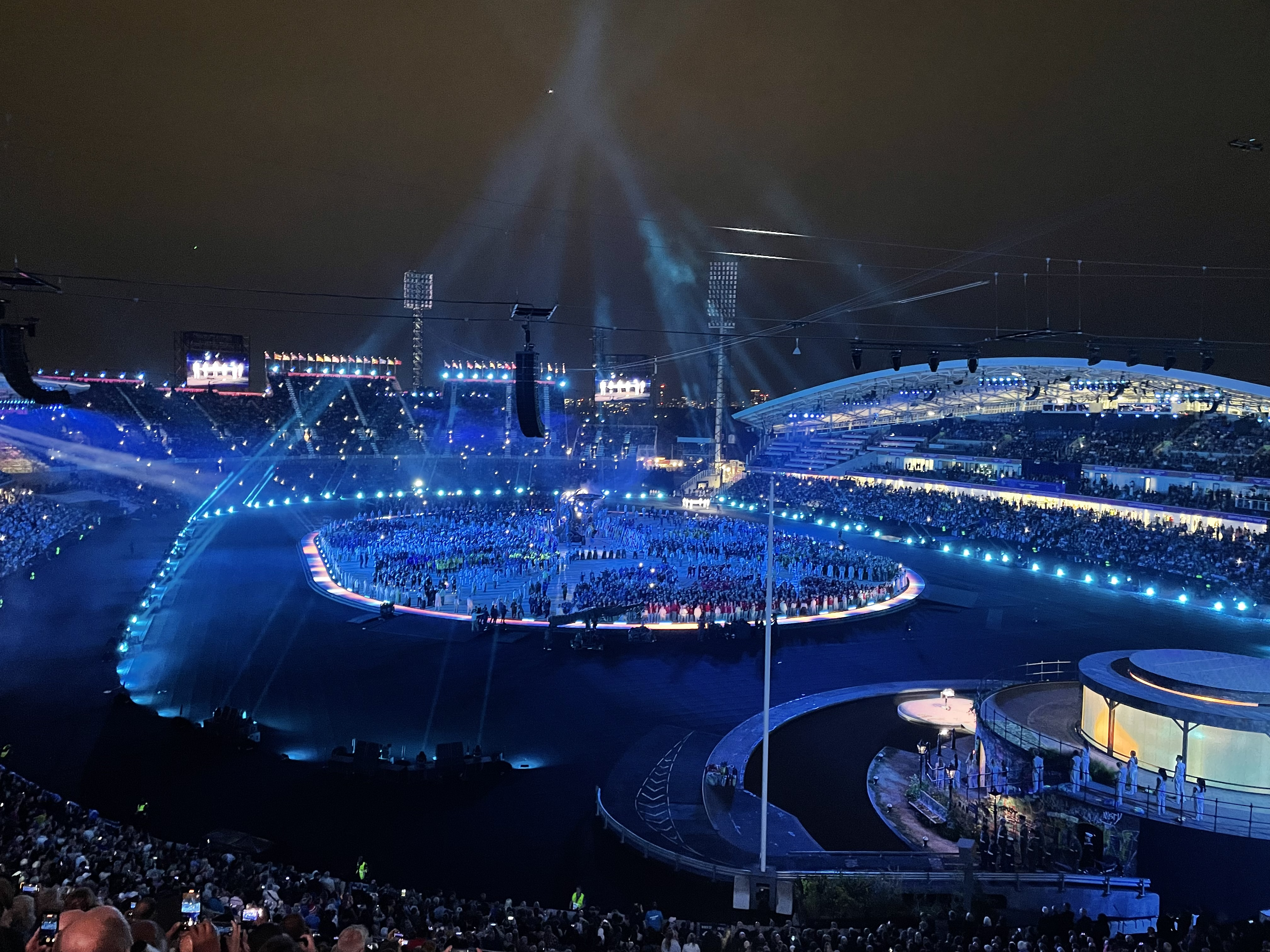
2022 Opening Ceremony

The 2022 Commonwealth Games were held in Birmingham, England. It was the third Commonwealth Games to be hosted in England, following London 1934 and Manchester 2002. The 2022 Commonwealth Games coincided with the Platinum Jubilee of Elizabeth II and the tenth anniversary of the 2012 Summer Olympics and the 2012 Summer Paralympics, both staged in London. The 2022 Commonwealth Games was the last edition to be held under Queen Elizabeth II, before her death on 8 September 2022.

On 16 February 2022, it was announced that the 2026 Commonwealth Games would be held for a record sixth time in Australia, but for the first time they would be decentralised, as the state of Victoria signed as host 'city'. The event were to have four regional clusters mainly focused in Bendigo region, and another three regional centres. However, in July 2023, the Victorian Premier Daniel Andrews announced that Victoria would no longer host the 2026 Games. The Scottish government later agreed to hold the 2026 games in Glasgow, following Victoria's cancellation, however the games will be "scaled down" with only 10 sports being staged in four venues, and a commitment that public funds would not be required. The 2026 Commonwealth Games will be the first held under the reign of King Charles III. The three nations to have hosted the Commonwealth Games the most times are Australia (5), Canada (4) and Scotland (4). New Zealand has 3 and with the 2022 games, England also increased its number to three. One Games had been hosted in Wales, two in Asia (Malaysia (1) and India (1)) and one in the Caribbean (Jamaica (1)). The event has been awarded to, but never been held in, Africa, with Durban being stripped of the 2022 Games following financial issues.

The 2030 Commonwealth Games will be held in Ahmedabad and it will mark the centenary of the inaugural Commonwealth Games.

=== Paraplegic Games ===
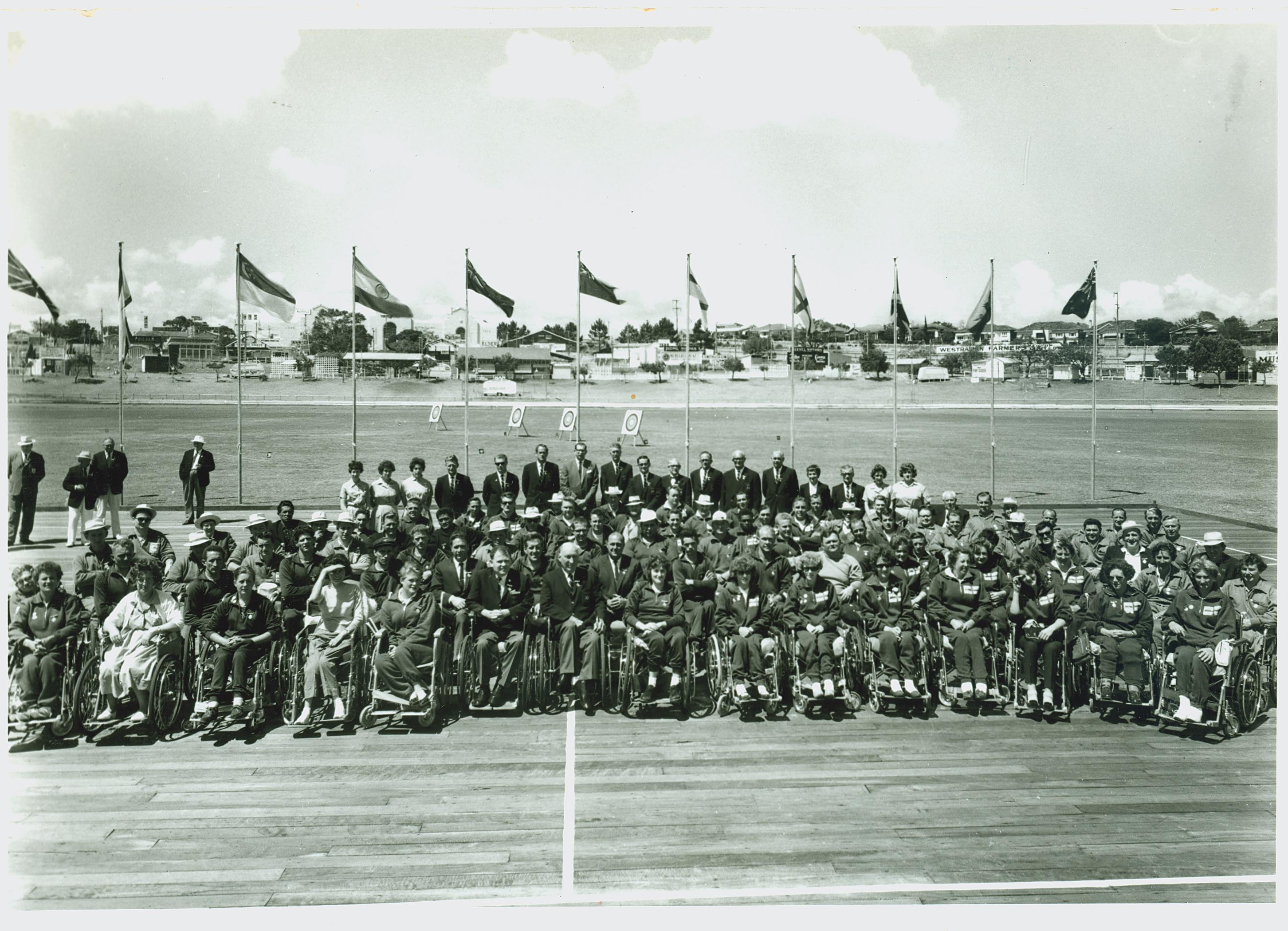
Athletes of the 1962 Commonwealth Paraplegic Games at Perth

The Commonwealth Paraplegic Games were an international, multi-sport event involving athletes with a disability from the Commonwealth countries. The event was sometimes referred to as the Paraplegic Empire Games and British Commonwealth Paraplegic Games. Athletes were generally those with spinal injuries or polio. The event was first held in 1962 and disestablished in 1974. The Games were held in the country hosting the Commonwealth Games for able-bodied athletes. The countries that had hosted the Commonwealth Paraplegic Games were Australia, Jamaica, Scotland and New Zealand in 1962, 1966, 1970 and 1974. Six countries – Australia, England, New Zealand, Northern Ireland, Scotland and Wales — had been represented at all Commonwealth Paraplegic Games. Australia and England had been the top-ranking nation two times each: 1962, 1974 and 1966, 1970.

==== Inclusion of disabled athletes in Commonwealth Games ====
Athletes with a disability were then first included the 1994 Commonwealth Games in Victoria, British Columbia when this event was added to athletics and lawn bowls, As at 2002 Commonwealth Games in Manchester, England, they were included as compulsory events, making them the first fully inclusive international multi-sport games. This meant that results were included in the medal count and the athletes are full members of each country delegation.

During the 2007 General Assembly of the Commonwealth Games Federation (CGF) at Colombo, Sri Lanka, the International Paralympic Committee (IPC) and CGF signed a co-operative agreement to ensure a formal institutional relationship between the two bodies and secure the future participation of elite athletes with a disability (EAD) in future Commonwealth Games. The co-operation agreement outlined the strong partnership between the IPC and the CGF. It recognised the IPC as the respective sport body and have the function to oversee the co-ordination and delivery of the Commonwealth Games EAD sports programme and committed both organisations to work together in supporting the growth of the Paralympic and Commonwealth Games Movements.

==== Winter Games ====
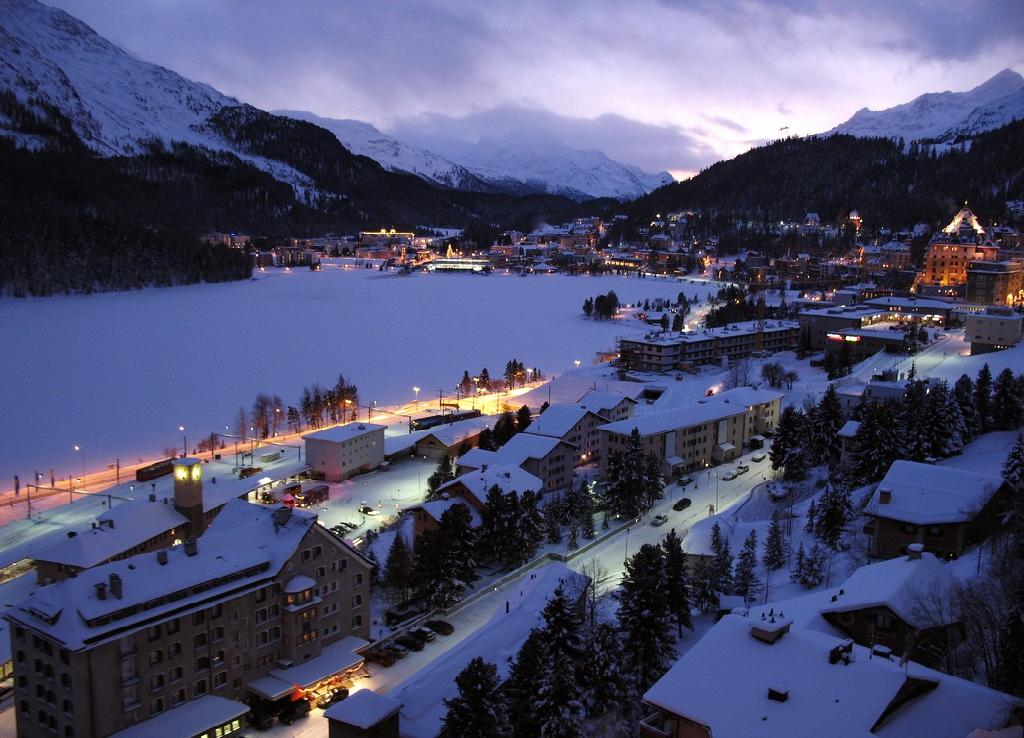
St. Moritz, the venue for all three Winter Games from 1958 to 1966

The Commonwealth Winter Games was a multi-sport event comprising winter sports, last held in 1970. Four editions of the Games have been staged. The Commonwealth Winter Games were designed as a counterbalance to the Commonwealth Games, which focuses on summer sports, to accompany the Winter Olympics and Summer Olympic Games. The winter Games were founded by T.D. Richardson. The 1958 Commonwealth Winter Games were held in St. Moritz, Switzerland and was the inaugural games for the winter edition. The 1962 Games were also held in St. Moritz, complementing the 1962 British Empire and Commonwealth Games in Perth, Australia, and the 1966 event was held in St. Moritz as well, following the 1970 edition, the idea was discontinued.

=== Youth Games ===
The Commonwealth Youth Games is an international multi-sport event organised by the Commonwealth Games Federation. The Commonwealth Youth Games is held every four years with the current Commonwealth Games format. The Commonwealth Games Federation discussed the idea of a Millennium Commonwealth Youth Games in 1997. In 1998, the concept was agreed on for the purpose of providing a Commonwealth multi-sport event for young people born in 1986 or later. The first version was held in Edinburgh, Scotland from 10 to 14 August 2000. The age limitation of the athletes is 14 to 18.

== Commonwealth Games Federation ==
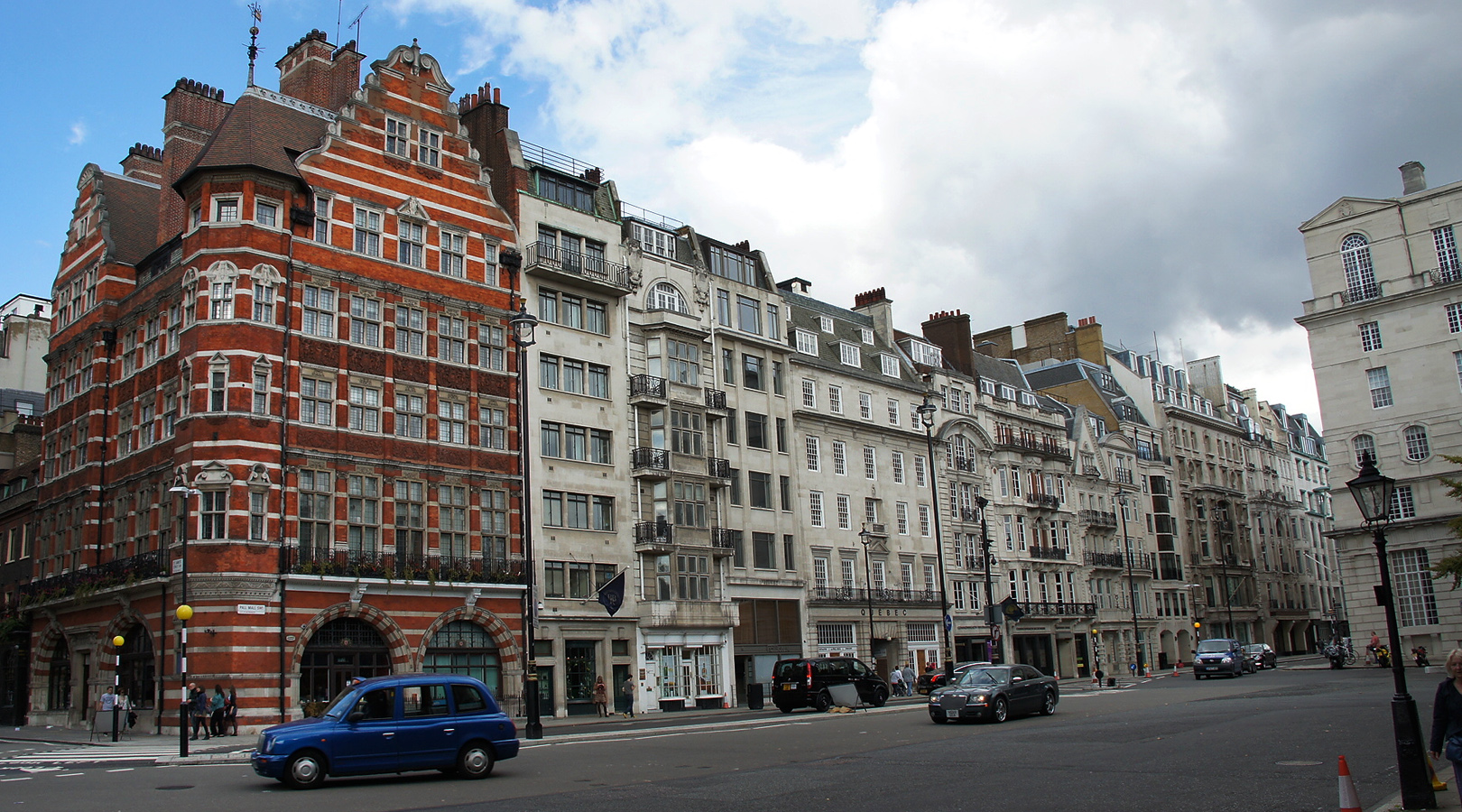
Headquarters of the CGF at the Commonwealth House (centre) in London

The Commonwealth Games Federation (CGF) is the international organisation responsible for the direction and control of the Commonwealth Games and Commonwealth Youth Games, and is the foremost authority in matters relating to the games. The Commonwealth House in London, England hosts the headquarters of CGF. The Commonwealth House also hosts the headquarters of the Royal Commonwealth Society and the Commonwealth Local Government Forum.

The Commonwealth Games Movement is made of three major elements:

- International Federations (IFs) are the governing bodies that supervise a sport at an international level. For example, the International Basketball Federation (FIBA) is the international governing body for basketball.
- Commonwealth Games Associations (CGAs) represent and regulate the Commonwealth Games Movement within each country and perform similar functions as the National Olympic Committees. For example, the Commonwealth Games England (CGE) is the CGA of England. There are currently 72 CGAs recognised by the CGF.
- Organising Committees for the Commonwealth Games (OCCWGs) are temporary committees responsible for the organisation of each Commonwealth Games. OCCWGs are dissolved after each Games once the final report is delivered to the CGF.

English is the official language of the Commonwealth. The other language used at each Commonwealth Games is the language of the host country (or languages, if a country has more than one official language apart from English). Every proclamation (such as the announcement of each country during the parade of nations in the opening ceremony) is spoken in these two (or more) languages. If the host country does this, it is their responsibility to choose the language{s) and their order.

== King's Baton Relay ==
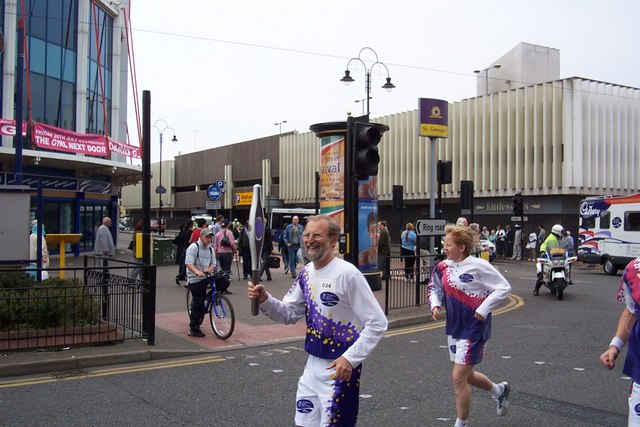
The Queen's Jubilee Baton Relay for the 2002 Commonwealth Games

The King's Baton Relay is a relay around the world held prior to the beginning of the Commonwealth Games. The baton carries a message from the Head of the Commonwealth. The relay traditionally begins at Buckingham Palace in London as a part of the city's Commonwealth Day festivities. The king entrusts the baton to the first relay runner. At the opening ceremony of the Games, the final relay runner hands the baton back to the king or his representative, who reads the message aloud to officially open the Games. The King's Baton Relay is similar to the Olympic Torch Relay.

The relay was introduced at the 1958 British Empire and Commonwealth Games in Cardiff, Wales as the Queen's Baton Relay. Up until, and including, the 1994 Commonwealth Games, the relay only went through England and the host nation. The relay for the 1998 Commonwealth Games in Kuala Lumpur, Malaysia, was the first to travel to other nations of the Commonwealth.

The Queen's Baton Relay for the 2018 Commonwealth Games held on the Gold Coast, Australia, was the longest in Commonwealth Games history. Covering 230,000 km (150,000 miles) over 388 days, the Baton made its way through the six Commonwealth regions of Africa, the Americas, the Caribbean, Europe, Asia and Oceania. For the first time, the Queen's Baton was presented at the Commonwealth Youth Games during its sixth edition in 2017, which were held in Nassau, Bahamas.

== Ceremonies ==
=== Opening ===
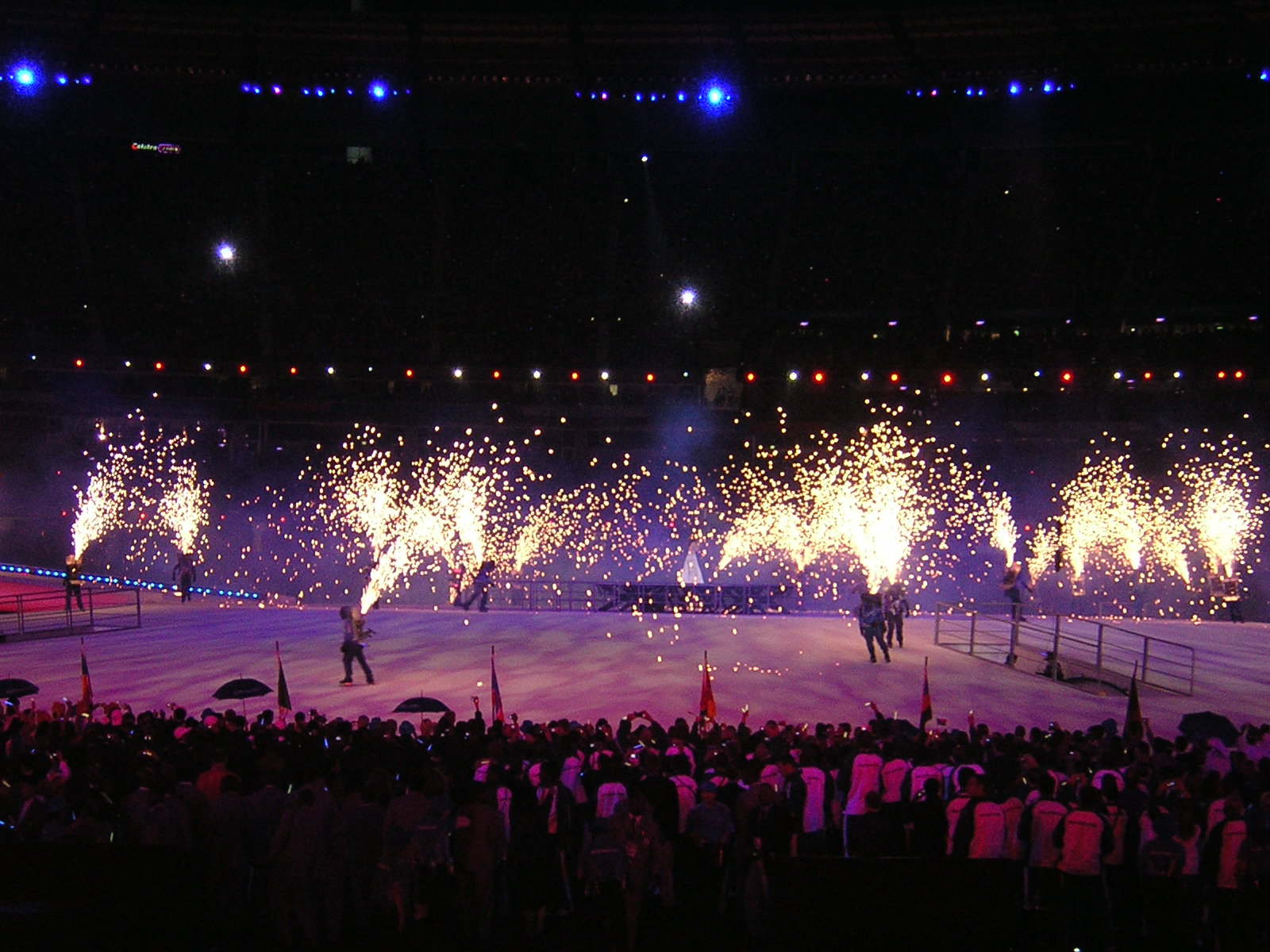
Opening ceremony of the 2006 Commonwealth Games at Melbourne

The opening ceremony typically starts with the hoisting of the host country's flag and a performance of its national anthem. The flag of the Commonwealth Games Federation, flag of the last hosting nation and the next hosting nation are also hosted during the opening ceremony. The host nation then presents artistic displays of music, singing, dance and theatre representative of its culture. The artistic presentations have grown in scale and complexity as successive hosts attempt to provide a ceremony that outlasts its predecessor's in terms of memorability. The opening ceremony of the Delhi Games reportedly cost $70 million, with much of the cost incurred in the artistic segment.

After the artistic portion of the ceremony, the athletes parade into the stadium grouped by nation. The last hosting nation is traditionally the first nation to enter. Nations then enter the stadium alphabetical or continental wise with the host country's athletes being the last to enter. Speeches are given, formally opening the Games. Finally, the King's Baton is brought into the stadium and passed on until it reaches the final baton carrier, often a successful Commonwealth athlete from the host nation, who hands it over to the Head of the Commonwealth or his representative.

=== Closing ===
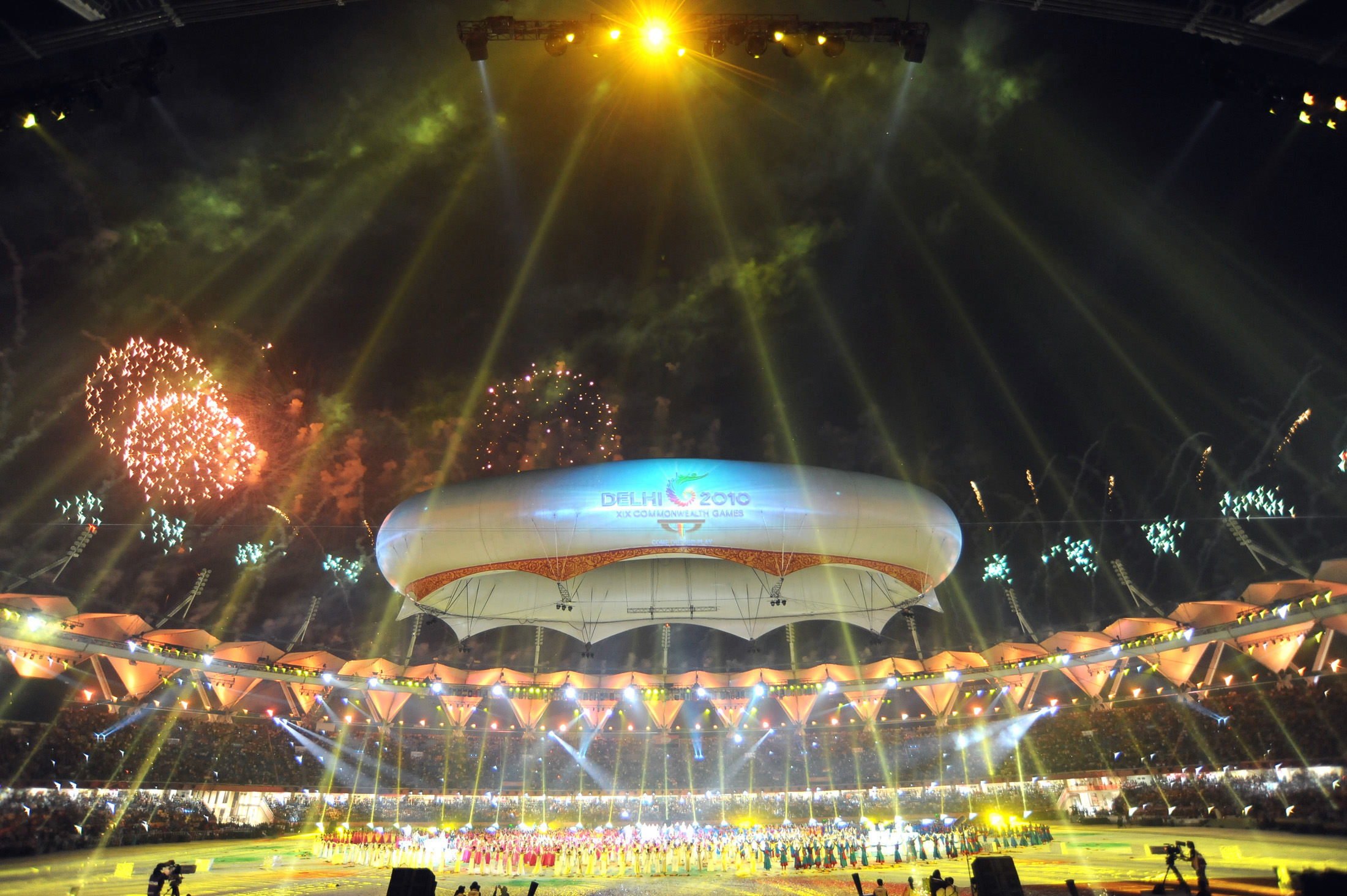
Closing ceremony of the 2010 Commonwealth Games at Delhi

The closing ceremony of the Commonwealth Games takes place after all sporting events have concluded. Flag-bearers from each participating country enter the stadium, followed by the athletes who enter together, without any national distinction. The president of the organising committee and the CGF president make their closing speeches and the Games are officially closed. The CGF president also speaks about the conduct of the games. The mayor of the city that organised the Games transfers the CGF flag to the president of the CGF, who then passes it on to the mayor of the city hosting the next Commonwealth Games. The next host nation then also briefly introduces itself with artistic displays of dance and theatre representative of its culture. Many great artists and singers had performed at the ceremonies of the Commonwealth Games.

At the closing ceremony of every Commonwealth Games, the CGF President makes an award and presents a trophy to one athlete who has competed with particular distinction and honour both in terms of athletic performance and overall contribution to his or her team. Athletes are nominated by their Commonwealth Games Association at the end of the final day of competition and the winner is selected by a panel comprising the CGF President and representatives from each of the six Commonwealth Regions. The 'David Dixon Award' as it is called was introduced in Manchester 2002, after the late David Dixon, former Honorary Secretary of the CGF, in honour of his monumental contribution to Commonwealth sport for many years.

=== Medal presentation ===
A medal ceremony is held after each event is concluded. The winner, second and third-place competitors or teams stand on top of a three-tiered rostrum to be awarded their respective medals. After the medals are given out by a CGF member, the national flags of the three medallists are raised while the national anthem of the gold medallist's country plays. Volunteering citizens of the host country also act as hosts during the medal ceremonies, as they aid the officials who present the medals and act as flag-bearers.

=== Anthems ===
"God Save the King" is an official or national anthem of multiple Commonwealth countries and dependent territories. As a result, and due to the countries of the United Kingdom competing individually, its use is prohibited during official events, medal ceremonies or before matches in team events. With the revision of this rule made before the 2010 Games, some national anthems used were changed and in some cases they differ from a currently-eligible country's national or official anthem(s):

Country	Anthem used at the Commonwealth Games	National Anthem(s)/Official Anthem(s)
Anguilla	"God Bless Anguilla"	"God Save the King"
Bermuda	"Hail to Bermuda"	"God Save the King"
British Virgin Islands	"Oh, Beautiful Virgin Islands"	"God Save the King"
Cayman Islands	"Beloved Isle Cayman"	"God Save the King"
England	"Land of Hope and Glory" (until 2010) "Jerusalem" (since 2010)	None; "God Save the King" as part of the United Kingdom
Falkland Islands	"Song of the Falklands"	"God Save the King"
Gibraltar	"Gibraltar Anthem"	"God Save the King"
Guernsey	"Sarnia Cherie"	"God Save the King"
Jersey	"Island Home"	"God Save the King"
Montserrat	"Motherland"	"God Save the King"
New Zealand	"God Defend New Zealand"	"God Defend New Zealand" (since 1976) "God Save the King"
Niue	"Ko e Iki he Lagi (Lord in Heaven, Thou art merciful)"	"God Defend New Zealand" (since 1976) "God Save the King"
Norfolk Island	"Come Ye Blessed"	"Advance Australia Fair"
Northern Ireland	"Londonderry Air"	None; "God Save the King" as part of the United Kingdom
Saint Helena	"My Saint Helena Island"	"God Save the King"
Scotland	"Scotland the Brave" (until 2010) "Flower of Scotland" (since 2010)	None; "God Save the King" as part of the United Kingdom
Turks and Caicos Islands	"This Land of Ours"	"God Save the King"
Wales	"Hen Wlad Fy Nhadau (Land of my Fathers)"	None; "God Save the King" as part of the United Kingdom

== List of Commonwealth Games ==
Host cities of Commonwealth Games
(Canada and Caribbean)
Host cities of Commonwealth Games
(Great Britain)
Host cities of Commonwealth Games
(Australia, New Zealand and Oceania)
Host cities of Commonwealth Games
(Asia)

Overview of Commonwealth Games
Year	Edition	Host city	Host Association	Opened by	Sports	Events	Associations	Start date	End date	Competitors	Top Association	Ref
1930	I	Hamilton	Canada	Viscount Willingdon	6	59	11	16 August	23 August	400	England	
1934	II	London	England	King George V	6	68	16	4 August	11 August	500	England	
1938	III	Sydney	Australia	Lord Wakehurst	7	71	15	5 February	12 February	464	Australia	
1942	–	Montreal	Canada	Cancelled due to World War II								
1946	–	Cardiff	Wales	Cancelled due to World War II								
1950	IV	Auckland	New Zealand	Sir Bernard Freyberg	9	88	12	4 February	11 February	590	Australia	
1954	V	Vancouver	Canada	Earl Alexander of Tunis	9	91	24	30 July	7 August	662	England	
1958	VI	Cardiff	Wales	Philip, Duke of Edinburgh	9	94	36	18 July	26 July	1,122	England	
1962	VII	Perth	Australia	Philip, Duke of Edinburgh	9	104	35	22 November	1 December	863	Australia	
1966	VIII	Kingston	Jamaica	Philip, Duke of Edinburgh	9	110	34	4 August	13 August	1,050	England	
1970	IX	Edinburgh	Scotland	Philip, Duke of Edinburgh	9	121	42	16 July	25 July	1,383	Australia	
1974	X	Christchurch	New Zealand	Philip, Duke of Edinburgh	9	121	38	24 January	2 February	1,276	Australia	
1978	XI	Edmonton	Canada	Queen Elizabeth II	10	128	46	3 August	12 August	1,474	Canada	
1982	XII	Brisbane	Australia	Philip, Duke of Edinburgh	10	142	46	30 September	9 October	1,583	Australia	
1986	XIII	Edinburgh	Scotland	Queen Elizabeth II	10	163	26	24 July	2 August	1,662	England	
1990	XIV	Auckland	New Zealand	Prince Edward	10	204	55	24 January	3 February	2,073	Australia	
1994	XV	Victoria	Canada	Queen Elizabeth II	10	217	63	18 August	28 August	2,557	Australia	
1998	XVI	Kuala Lumpur	Malaysia	Yang di-Pertuan Agong Tuanku Jaafar	15	213	70	11 September	21 September	3,633	Australia	
2002	XVII	Manchester	England	Queen Elizabeth II	17	281	72	25 July	4 August	3,679	Australia	
2006	XVIII	Melbourne	Australia	Queen Elizabeth II	17	245	71	15 March	26 March	4,049	Australia	
2010	XIX	Delhi	India	President Pratibha Patil and Charles, Prince of Wales	17	272	71	3 October	14 October	4,352	Australia	
2014	XX	Glasgow	Scotland	Queen Elizabeth II	18	261	71	23 July	3 August	4,947	England	
2018	XXI	Gold Coast	Australia	Charles, Prince of Wales	18	275	71	4 April	15 April	4,426	Australia	
2022	XXII	Birmingham	England	Charles, Prince of Wales	20	283	72	28 July	8 August	5,054	Australia	
2026	XXIII	Glasgow	Scotland	King Charles III	10	215	74	23 July	2 August	2,715	Australia	[24]
2030	XXIV	Ahmedabad	India	TBD								[25]

== Medal table ==
*Note : Nations in italics no longer participate at the Commonwealth Games.

Updated after 2026 Commonwealth Games,

Rank	CGA	Gold	Silver	Bronze	Total
1	Australia	1,071	879	823	2,773
2	England	802	828	802	2,432
3	Canada	529	568	612	1,709
4	India	215	207	180	602
5	New Zealand	189	246	308	743
6	Scotland	145	152	244	541
7	South Africa	144	143	157	444
8	Kenya	94	84	92	270
9	Nigeria	92	91	112	295
10	Wales	84	114	167	365
11	Jamaica	75	57	63	195
12	Malaysia	74	76	94	244
13	Northern Ireland	40	50	68	158
14	Singapore	40	33	36	109
15	Pakistan	27	27	29	83
16	Cyprus	26	21	29	76
17	Uganda	19	18	26	63
18	Ghana^{[a]}	15	21	29	65
19	Trinidad and Tobago	13	26	30	69
20	Bahamas	12	14	14	40
21	Cameroon	12	13	20	45
22	Nauru	10	11	12	33
23	Samoa	7	13	11	31
24	Zimbabwe^{[b]}	6	9	14	29
25	Tanzania	6	7	11	24
26	Zambia^{[c]}	5	13	26	44
27	Sri Lanka^{[d]}	5	10	11	26
28	Papua New Guinea	5	8	3	16
29	Fiji	5	7	13	25
30	Botswana	5	6	8	19
31	Namibia	5	5	17	27
32	Hong Kong	5	2	10	17
33	Guyana^{[e]}	4	6	6	16
34	Isle of Man	4	3	7	14
35	Grenada	4	2	2	8
36	Barbados	3	5	8	16
37	Bermuda	3	2	4	9
38	British Virgin Islands	3	0	0	3
39	Mauritius	2	11	9	22
40	Mozambique	2	4	3	9
41	Bangladesh	2	4	2	8
42	Jersey	2	1	3	6
43	Saint Vincent and the Grenadines	2	0	1	3
44	Guernsey	1	5	3	9
45	Dominica	1	2	1	4
46	Lesotho	1	1	3	5
46	Saint Lucia	1	1	3	5
48	Cayman Islands	1	0	1	2
49	Kiribati	1	0	0	1
49	Saint Kitts and Nevis	1	0	0	1
51	Seychelles	0	3	4	7
52	Rhodesia and Nyasaland	0	2	5	7
53	Malta	0	1	7	8
54	Swaziland^{[f]}	0	1	3	4
55	The Gambia	0	1	2	3
56	Ireland	0	1	0	1
57	Tonga	0	0	4	4
58	Malawi	0	0	3	3
58	Norfolk Island	0	0	3	3
58	Vanuatu	0	0	3	3
61	Cook Islands	0	0	1	1
61	Gabon	0	0	1	1
61	Niue	0	0	1	1
61	Rwanda	0	0	1	1
61	Solomon Islands	0	0	1	1
61	Tuvalu	0	0	1	1
Totals (66 entries)		3,820	3,815	4,167	11,802

- ^[a] Totals for Ghana include all medals won as Gold Coast
- ^[b] Totals for Zimbabwe include all medals won as Southern Rhodesia
- ^[c] Totals for Zambia include all medals won as Northern Rhodesia
- ^[d] Totals for Sri Lanka include all medals won as Ceylon
- ^[e] Totals for Guyana include all medals won as British Guiana
- ^[f] Swaziland has changed its name to Eswatini

=== Medal leaders by year ===
Commonwealth Games medal table by year
- 1930: England
- 1934: England
- 1938: Australia
- 1950: Australia
- 1954: England
- 1958: England
- 1962: Australia
- 1970: Australia
- 1974: Australia
- 1978: Canada
- 1982: Australia
- 1986: England
- 1990: Australia
- 1994: Australia
- 1998: Australia
- 2002: Australia
- 2006: Australia
- 2010: Australia
- 2014: England
- 2018: Australia
- 2022: Australia
- 2026: Australia

== Commonwealth sports ==
Unlike other sporting events, the Commonwealth Games have a flexible sporting programme that respects the infrastructure and demands of the host city. This is also reflected in its holding dates, which may vary according to the weather conditions of each host city. Therefore, the programme for each edition varies. Between 1930 and 1994, only individual events were part of the programme and it was only in 1998 that authorisation was given for the addition of team sports. It is common for each edition since then to have a list of seven to ten mandatory sports that must be played in this edition and must be approved 4 years in advance. Thus, the minimum number of sports per edition is 10 and the maximum is of 17. However, local demands can also increase the number of sports contested. Notable cases are freestyle wrestling in Delhi 2010 and beach volleyball in Gold Coast 2018. Special exceptions can also be made, such as the one in the last edition held in Birmingham, England, in which 3 extra sports were added to the programme. The current rules also determine gender parity, whereby men and women have an equal (or broadly equal) share of events.

This rule was not exceptionally applied to the 2026 Games, as Glasgow took over as host on an emergency basis. As a result, the program will feature only 10 sports—the fewest number since the 1994 Games:

There are a total of 23 sports (with three multi-disciplinary sports) and a ten para-sports which are approved by the Commonwealth Games Federation.

Sport	Type	Years
Archery	Core	1982, 2010
Athletics	Core	1930–present
Para Athletics	Core	1994, 2002–present
Badminton	Optional	1966–2022
Basketball		2006, 2018
Basketball 3x3	Optional	2022–present
Boxing	Optional	1930–present
Cricket	Optional	1998, 2022
Cycling (Mountain Bike)	Optional	2002–2006, 2014–present
Cycling (Para Track)	Optional	2014–present
Cycling (Road)	Optional	1938–present
Cycling (Track)	Optional	1934–present
Diving	Optional	1930–2022
Hockey	Optional	1998–2022
Gymnastics (Artistic)	Optional	1978, 1990–present
Gymnastics (Rhythmic)	Optional	1978, 1990–1998, 2006–present
Judo	Optional	1990, 2002, 2014 (Optional), 2022-present
Lawn bowls	Optional	1930–1962, 1970–present

Sport	Type	Years
Para lawn bowls	Optional	1994, 2002, 2014–present
Netball (Women)	Optional	1998–present
Powerlifting	Optional	2002–present
Rugby sevens	Optional	1998–2022
Shooting	Optional	1966, 1974–2018
Squash	Optional	1998–2022
Swimming	Core	1930–present
Para swimming	Core	2002–present
Table tennis	Optional	2002–2022
Para table tennis	Optional	2002–2022
Triathlon	Optional	2002–2006, 2014–2022
Volleyball (beach)	Optional	2018–2022
Weightlifting	Optional	1950–present
Wrestling (Freestyle)	Optional	1930–1986, 1994, 2002, 2010–2022

In 2015, the Commonwealth Games Federation agreed large changes to the programme which increased the number of core sports, while removing a number of optionals, those removed are listed below.

Sport	Type	Years
Canoeing	Optional	Never
Rowing	Optional	1930, 1938–1962, 1986
Sailing	Optional	Never
Softball	Optional	Never
Synchronised swimming	Optional	Core between 1986 and 2006

Sport	Type	Years
Taekwondo	Optional	Never
Tennis	Optional	2010
Ten-pin bowling	Optional	1998
Wrestling (Greco-Roman)	Optional	2010

Sports such as the following are sports which have been analysed by the Commonwealth Games Federation but which are deemed to need expansion in areas such as participation levels within the Commonwealth both at a national (International Federation) and grassroots athletics level, Marketability, Television Rights, Equity, and Hosting Expenses, per Regulation 6 of the Commonwealth Games Constitution; host nations may not pick these sports for their program until the Federation's requirements are fulfilled.

Sport	Type	Years
Billiards	Recognised	Never
Fencing	Recognised	1950–1970
Association Football	Recognised	Never
Golf	Recognised	Never (Note: Originally planned for 2026, before Victoria pulled out of hosting.)
Handball	Recognised	Never

Sport	Type	Years
Life saving	Recognised	Never
Rugby league	Recognised	Never
Volleyball (indoor)	Recognised	Never
Water Polo	Recognised	1950

== Participating nations ==
Only six teams have attended every Commonwealth Games: Australia, Canada, England, New Zealand, Scotland, and Wales. Australia has been the highest scoring team for thirteen games, England for seven, and Canada for one.

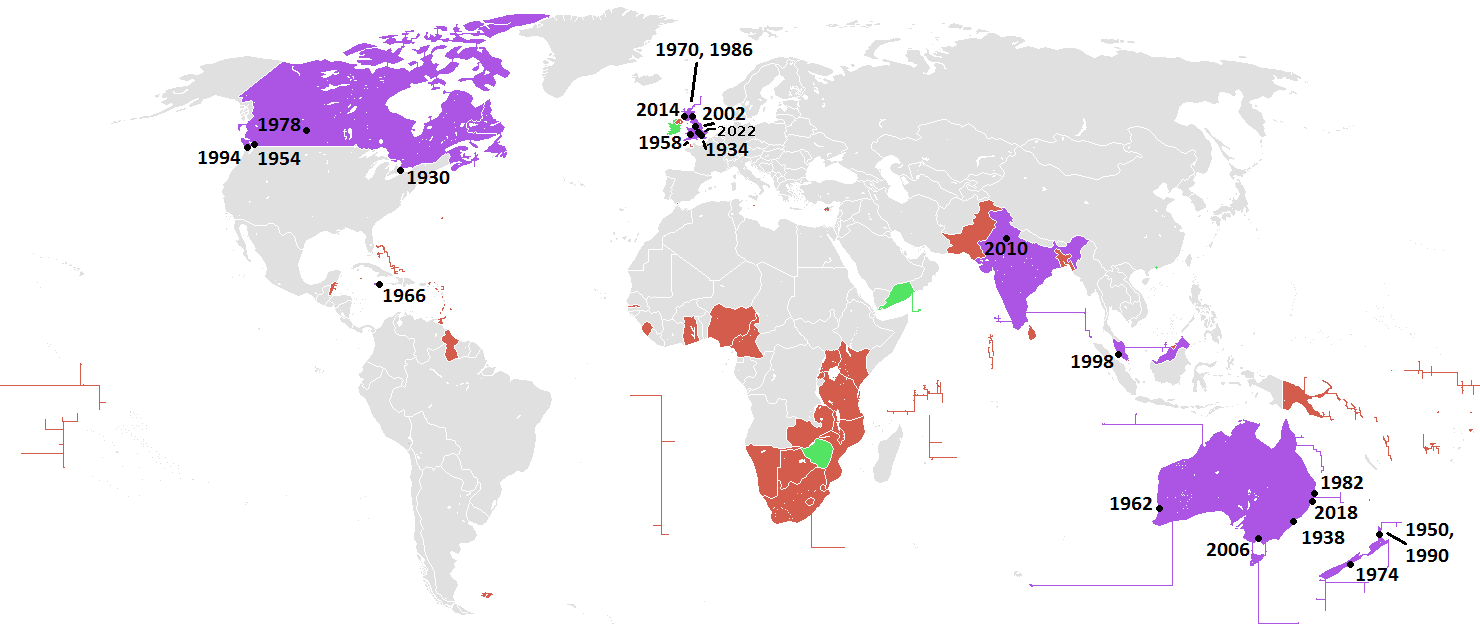
Countries that have hosted, or plan to host, the event Other countries that enter the games Countries that have entered the games but no longer do so • Host cities and year of games

Table of Team Participation by Commonwealth Games Edition
Team	Edition	I	II	III	IV	V	VI	VII	VIII	IX	X	XI	XII	XIII	XIV	XV	XVI	XVII	XVIII	XIX	XX	XXI	XXII
Team	Year	1930	1934	1938	1950	1954	1958	1962	1966	1970	1974	1978	1982	1986	1990	1994	1998	2002	2006	2010	2014	2018	2022
Team	Host Flag	(Canada)	(England)	(Australia)	(New Zealand)	(Canada)	(Wales)	(Australia)	(Jamaica)	(Scotland)	(New Zealand)	(Canada)	(Australia)	(Scotland)	(New Zealand)	(Canada)	(Malaysia)	(England)	(Australia)	(India)	(Scotland)	(Australia)	(England)
Team	Host city	Hamilton	London	Sydney	Auckland	Vancouver	Cardiff	Perth	Kingston	Edinburgh	Christchurch	Edmonton	Brisbane	Edinburgh	Auckland	Victoria	Kuala Lumpur	Manchester	Melbourne	Delhi	Glasgow	Gold Coast	Birmingham
Team	Participation \\ Host nation	Canada	England	Australia	New Zealand	Canada	Wales	Australia	Jamaica	Scotland	New Zealand	Canada	Australia	Scotland	New Zealand	Canada	Malaysia	England	Australia	India	Scotland	Australia	England
Aden (Note: Aden later joined South Arabia in 1963 and departed the Commonwealth in 1967.)	1962																						
Anguilla (Note: Anguilla was completely separated from Saint Christopher-Nevis-Anguilla in 1980 and remaining Saint Kitts and Nevis became independent from the United Kingdom in 1983.)	1998–																						
Antigua and Barbuda	1966–1970, 1978, 1994–																						
Australia	1930–																						
Bahamas	1954–1970, 1978–1982, 1990–																						
Bangladesh	1978, 1990–																						
Barbados	1954–1982, 1990–																						
Belize (Note: British Honduras was renamed Belize in 1973.)	1978, 1994–																						
Bermuda	1930–1938, 1954–1982, 1990–																						
Botswana	1974, 1982–																						
British Guiana (Note: British Guiana was renamed Guyana in 1966.)	1930–1938, 1954–1962																						
British Honduras	1962–1966																						
British Virgin Islands	1990–																						
Brunei Darussalam	1990–																						
Cameroon	1998–																						
Canada	1930–																						
Cayman Islands	1978–																						
Ceylon (Note: Ceylon was renamed Sri Lanka in 1972.)	1938–1950, 1958–1970																						
Cook Islands	1974–1978, 1986–																						
Cyprus	1978–1982, 1990–																						
Dominica	1958–1962, 1970, 1994–																						
England	1930–																						
Eswatini (Note: Swaziland was renamed Eswatini in 2018.)	2022–																						
Falkland Islands	1982–																						
Fiji (Note: Fiji was re-suspended from the Commonwealth and the 2010 Games in 2009. Fiji's suspension from the Commonwealth was lifted in time for the 2014 Games following democratic elections in March 2014.)	1938, 1954–1986, 1998–2006, 2014–																						
Gambia (Note: The Gambia withdrew from the Commonwealth in 2013, but rejoined on 8 February 2018; The Gambia was readmitted to the Commonwealth Games Federation in March 2018.)	1970–1982, 1990–2010, 2018–																						
Ghana (Note: Gold Coast (British colony) was renamed Ghana in 1957.)	1958–1982, 1990–																						
Gibraltar	1958–																						
Gold Coast	1954																						
Grenada	1970–1982, 1998–																						
Guernsey (Note: Including neighbouring Islands.)	1970–																						
Guyana	1966–1970, 1978–1982, 1990–																						
Hong Kong (Note: Hong Kong was never a Commonwealth member but was a territory of a Commonwealth country; it ceased to be in the Commonwealth when the territory was handed over to China in 1997.)	1934, 1954–1962, 1970–1994																						
India	1934–1938, 1954–1958, 1966–1982, 1990–																						
Ireland (Note: Ireland was represented as a single team from the whole of the island in 1930, and by two teams, representing the Irish Free State, and Northern Ireland in 1934. The Irish Free State was officially renamed Éire in 1937 but did not participate in the 1938 Games, and withdrew from the Commonwealth when it unilaterally declared that it was the Republic of Ireland on 18 April 1949.) (Note: Contemporary illustrations show Green Flag used for the Irish team.)	1930																						
Isle of Man	1958–																						
Jamaica	1934, 1954–1982, 1990–																						
Jersey	1958–																						
Kenya	1954–1982, 1990–																						
Kiribati	1998–																						
Lesotho	1974–																						
Malawi	1970–																						
Malaya (Note: Malaya, North Borneo, Sarawak and Singapore federated as Malaysia in 1963. Singapore was expelled from the federation in 1965, becoming a sovereign country.)	1950, 1958–1962																						
Malaysia	1966–1982, 1990–																						
Maldives	1986–2014, 2022–																						
Malta	1958–1962, 1970, 1982–																						
Mauritius	1958, 1966–1982, 1990–																						
Montserrat	1994–																						
Mozambique	1998–																						
Namibia	1994–																						
Nauru	1990–																						
Newfoundland (Note: Newfoundland joined Canada in 1949.)	1930–1934																						
New Zealand	1930–																						
Nigeria	1950–1958, 1966–1974, 1982, 1990–1994, 2002–																						
Niue	2002–																						
Norfolk Island	1986–																						
North Borneo	1958–1962																						
Northern Ireland (Note: The Ulster Banner was the flag of the former Government of Northern Ireland only between 1953 and 1972, but the flag has been regarded as flag of Northern Ireland since 1924 among unionists and loyalists. The Ulster Banner is the sporting flag of Northern Ireland in other events such as the FIFA World Cup and in the FIVB Volleyball World Championship.)	1934–1938, 1954–																						
Northern Rhodesia (Note: Southern Rhodesia and Northern Rhodesia competed separately in 1954 and 1958 while both were part of the Federation of Rhodesia and Nyasaland.) (Note: Southern Rhodesia and Northern Rhodesia federated with Nyasaland in 1953 as Rhodesia and Nyasaland, which dissolved at the end of 1963 and became Zambia in 1964.)	1954–1958																						
Pakistan	1954–1970, 1990–																						
Papua New Guinea	1962–1982, 1990–																						
Rhodesia and Nyasaland	1962																						
Rwanda	2010–																						
Saint Christopher-Nevis-Anguilla	1978																						
Saint Helena (Note: Under the name of "Saint Helena" in the Commonwealth Games. Ascension Island and Tristan da Cunha were dependencies of Saint Helena, so the territory was officially called "Saint Helena and Dependencies" until 2009. Saint Helena, Ascension Island and Tristan da Cunha became equal parts of Saint Helena, Ascension and Tristan da Cunha in 2009.)	1982, 1998–																						
Saint Kitts and Nevis	1990–																						
Saint Lucia	1962, 1970, 1978, 1994–																						
Saint Vincent and the Grenadines	1958, 1966–1978, 1994–																						
Samoa (Note: Western Samoa was renamed Samoa in 1997.)	1998–																						
(Crown Colony of Sarawak) Sarawak	1958–1962																						
Scotland	1930–																						
Seychelles	1990–																						
Sierra Leone	1958, 1966–1970, 1978, 1990–																						
Singapore	1958–																						
Solomon Islands	1982, 1990–																						
South Africa	1930–1958, 1994–																						
South Arabia	1966																						
Southern Rhodesia	1934–1958																						
Sri Lanka	1974–1982, 1990–																						
Swaziland	1970–2018																						
Tanganyika (Note: Zanzibar and Tanganyika federated to form Tanzania in 1964.)	1962																						
Tanzania	1966–1982, 1990–																						
Tonga	1974, 1982, 1990–																						
Trinidad and Tobago	1934–1982, 1990–																						
Turks and Caicos Islands	1978, 1998–																						
Tuvalu	1998–																						
Uganda	1954–1974, 1982, 1990–																						
Vanuatu	1982–																						
Wales	1930–																						
Western Samoa	1974–1994																						
Zambia	1970–1982, 1990–																						
Zimbabwe (Note: Zimbabwe withdrew from the Commonwealth in 2003.)	1982, 1990–2002																						
Legend
Participated Withdrew for political reason Not eligible to participate To be determined

Nation	Years of participation
Aden	1962
Anguilla	1998–
Australasia	1911
Antigua and Barbuda	1966–1970, 1978, 1994–
Australia	1930–
Bahamas	1954–1970, 1978–1982, 1990–
Bangladesh	1978, 1990–
Barbados	1954–1982, 1990–
Belize	1978, 1994–
Bermuda	1930–1938, 1954–1982, 1990–
Botswana	1974, 1982–
British Guiana	1930–1938, 1954–1962
British Honduras	1962–1966
British Virgin Islands	1990–
Brunei Darussalam	1990–
Cameroon	1998–
Canada	1911, 1930–
Cayman Islands	1978–
Ceylon	1938–1950, 1958–1970
Cook Islands	1974–1978, 1986–
Cyprus	1978–1982, 1990–
Dominica	1958–1962, 1970, 1994–
England	1930–
Eswatini	2022–
Falkland Islands	1982–
Fiji	1938, 1954–1986, 1998–2006, 2014–
Gabon	2026–
Gambia	1970–1982, 1990–2010, 2018–
Ghana	1958–1982, 1990–
Gibraltar	1958–
Gold Coast	1954
Grenada	1970–1982, 1998–
Guernsey	1970–
Guyana	1966–1970, 1978–1982, 1990–
Hong Kong	1934, 1954–1962, 1970–1994
India	1934–1938, 1954–1958, 1966–1982, 1990–
Ireland	1930
Irish Free State	1934
Isle of Man	1958–
Jamaica	1934, 1954–1982, 1990–
Jersey	1958–
Kenya	1954–1982, 1990–
Kiribati	1998–
Lesotho	1974–
Malawi	1970–
Malaya	1950, 1958–1962
Malaysia	1966–1982, 1990–
Maldives (Note: The Maldives withdrew from the Commonwealth in 2016, but was re-admitted in 2020.)	1986–2014, 2022–
Malta	1958–1962, 1970, 1982–

Nation	Years of participation
Mauritius	1958–1982, 1990–
Montserrat	1994–
Mozambique	1998–
Namibia	1994–
Nauru	1990–
Newfoundland	1930–1934
New Zealand	1930–
Nigeria	1950–1958, 1966–1974, 1982, 1990–1994, 2002–
Niue	2002–
Norfolk Island	1986–
North Borneo	1958–1962
Northern Ireland	1934–1938, 1954–
Northern Rhodesia	1954–1958
Pakistan	1954–1970, 1990–
Papua New Guinea	1962–1982, 1990–
Rhodesia and Nyasaland	1962
Rwanda	2010–
Saint Christopher-Nevis-Anguilla	1978
Saint Helena	1982, 1998–
Saint Kitts and Nevis	1990–
Saint Lucia	1962, 1970, 1978, 1994–
Saint Vincent and the Grenadines	1958, 1966–1978, 1994–
Samoa	1998–
(Crown Colony of Sarawak) Sarawak	1958–1962
Scotland	1930–
Seychelles	1990–
Sierra Leone	1958, 1966–1970, 1978, 1990–
Singapore	1958–
Solomon Islands	1982, 1990–
South Africa	1911–1958, 1994–
South Arabia	1966
Southern Rhodesia	1934–1958
Sri Lanka	1974–1982, 1990–
Swaziland	1970–2018
Tanganyika	1962
Tanzania	1966–1982, 1990–
Togo	2026–
Tonga	1974, 1982, 1990–
Trinidad and Tobago	1934–1982, 1990–
Turks and Caicos Islands	1978, 1998–
Tuvalu	2002–
Uganda	1954–1974, 1982, 1990–
United Kingdom	1911 (Note: United Kingdom were the host of the Inter-Empire Championships in 1911. This event was held before the 1st edition of the Games held in Hamilton, Canada in 1930.)
Vanuatu	1982–
Wales	1930–
Western Samoa	1974–1994
Zambia	1970–1982, 1990–
Zimbabwe	1982, 1990–2002

=== Commonwealth nations yet to send teams ===
Very few Commonwealth nations and dependencies have yet to take part:

- Tokelau, a dependency of New Zealand, was expected to take part for the first time at the 2010 Games in Delhi but did not do so. In 2018, Tokelau was noted to be ineligible for the Commonwealth Games until it became affiliated with at least five international sport federations.
- Christmas Island and the Cocos (Keeling) Islands, both external territories of Australia like Norfolk Island, have not yet sent teams of their own.
- Akrotiri and Dhekelia, a British Overseas Territory centered around British military bases, has not yet sent a team of its own.
- The Pitcairn Islands, a British Overseas Territory, does not compete due to its small population (around 50 people).

Other inhabited territories and autonomous regions within the Commonwealth, such as Alderney and Sark (part of the Bailiwick of Guernsey), Ascension Island and Tristan da Cunha (parts of the British Overseas Territory of Saint Helena, Ascension and Tristan da Cunha), Nevis (a federal entity of the Federation of Saint Kitts and Nevis), Rodrigues (an outer island of Mauritius), and Zanzibar (a semi-autonomous part of Tanzania), are not considered to be separate associated or overseas territories by the Commonwealth and so are unlikely to be eligible.

=== Rejected participants ===
Campaigners from the English county of Cornwall asked the Commonwealth Games Federation to allow Cornwall to participate independently in the 2006 Games, but were rejected by the CGF, which stated that "Cornwall is no more than an English county" and advised Cornwall athletes to compete on the England team. Cornwall political party Mebyon Kernow unsuccessfully called for a Cornwall team at the 2022 Games.

The Turkish Republic of Northern Cyprus applied to take part in the 2006 Games, but was rejected due to a lack of international recognition.

== Controversies ==
=== Host city contract ===
The 1934 British Empire Games, originally awarded in 1930 to Johannesburg, were moved to London after South Africa's pre-apartheid government refused to allow participants of colour.

The 2022 Commonwealth Games were originally awarded to Durban on 2 September 2015, at the CGF General Assembly in Auckland. It was reported in February 2017 that Durban may be unable to host the games due to financial constraints. On 13 March 2017, the CGF stripped Durban of their rights to host and reopened the bidding process for the 2022 games. Many cities from Australia, Canada, England and Malaysia expressed interest to host the games. However, the CGF received only one official bid and that was from Birmingham, England. On 21 December 2017, Birmingham was awarded the 2022 Games as Durban's replacement host.

A joint bid from 6 cities of the state of Victoria in Australia was selected to host the 2026 Commonwealth Games. On 18 July 2023, the Premier of Victoria Dan Andrews announced that the state was giving up on hosting the event due to a significant increase in event forecast. Initial costs estimated an investment of approximately A$2.6 billion, but the new prospects were resulting to be closer to A$6–7 billion. On 18 July 2023, the Victorian state government announced it had cancelled its plans to host the games, citing an escalation in its cost projections relative to initial estimations. With no host city, there was a possibility that the games would be postponed to 2027 or cancelled. However, on 17 September 2024, it was announced that the Scottish Government had agreed to host the 2026 games in Glasgow.

=== Boycotts ===
Much like the Olympic Games, the Commonwealth Games have also experienced boycotts:

Nigeria boycotted the 1978 Commonwealth Games at Edmonton in protest of New Zealand's sporting contacts with apartheid-era South Africa. Uganda also stayed away, in protest of alleged Canadian hostility towards the government of Idi Amin.

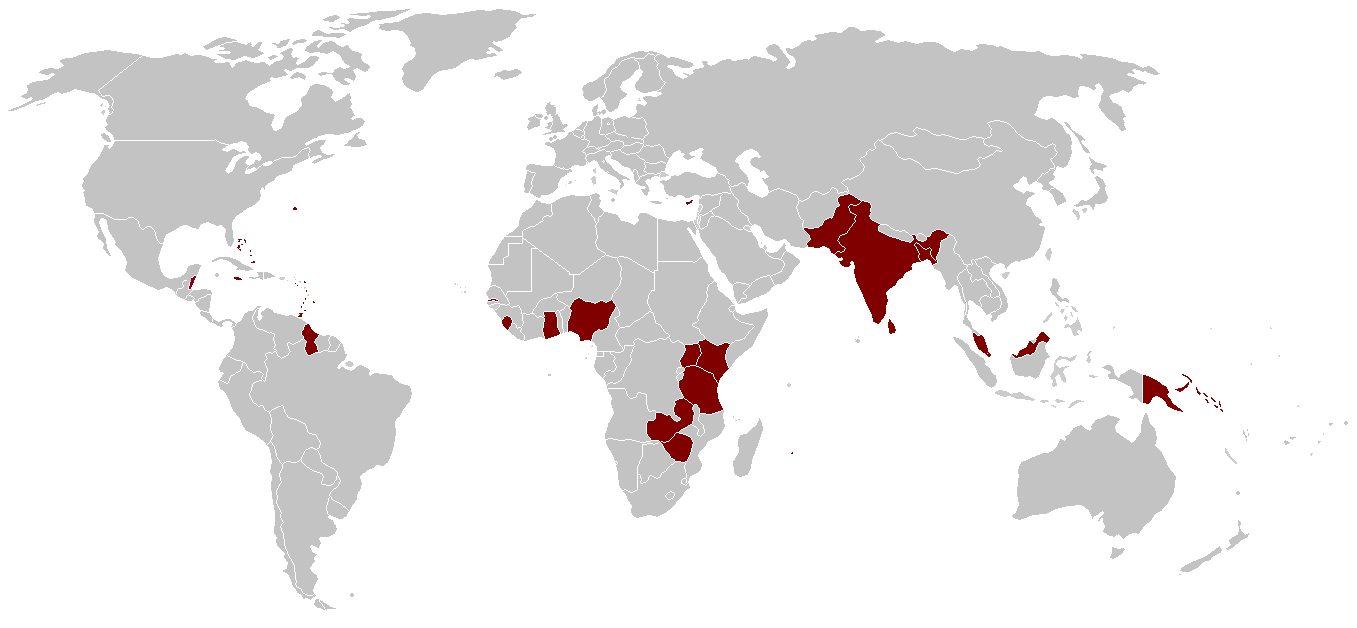
Countries that boycotted the 1986 Games are shaded red

During the 1986 Commonwealth Games at Edinburgh, a majority of the Commonwealth nations staged a boycott, so that the Games appeared to be a whites-only event. Thirty two of the eligible fifty nine countries—largely African, Asian and Caribbean states—stayed away because of the Thatcher government's policy of keeping Britain's sporting links with apartheid South Africa in preference to participating in the general sporting boycott of that country. Consequently, Edinburgh 1986 witnessed the lowest number of athletes since Auckland 1950. The boycotting nations were Antigua and Barbuda, Barbados, Bahamas, Bangladesh, Bermuda, Belize, Cyprus, Dominica, Gambia, Ghana, Guyana, Grenada, India, Jamaica, Kenya, Malaysia, Nigeria, Pakistan, Papua New Guinea, Solomon Islands, Sri Lanka, St. Vincent and the Grenadines, Sierra Leone, St. Kitts and Nevis, St. Lucia, Mauritius, Trinidad and Tobago, Tanzania, Turks and Caicos Islands, Uganda, Zambia and Zimbabwe. Bermuda was a particularly late withdrawal, as its athletes appeared in the opening ceremony and in the opening day of competition before the Bermuda Olympic Association decided to formally withdraw.

=== Protests ===
The 1982 Commonwealth Games in Brisbane took place amid mass protests for Australian Aboriginal rights. The controversial Joh Bjelke-Petersen state government had been repeatedly been challenged by the Queensland Council for Civil Liberties over the restrictions it placed on freedom of speech, freedom of association and freedom to protest. The Government of Queensland did not recognise Aboriginal land rights. Queensland also placed severe legal restrictions on Aboriginal people through the "Aboriginal Act 1971".

Aboriginal activists including Gary Foley planned mass demonstrations in Brisbane during the week of the games, dubbed the "Stolenwealth Games". In response, Queensland passed "The Commonwealth Games Act 1982" to restrict protests in or near the event. When Aboriginal activists and their supporters marched anyway, hundreds were arrested. The protests were recorded in the documentary Guniwaya Ngigu.

Further "Stolenwealth Games" protests took place during the 2006 Commonwealth Games in Melbourne and 2018 Commonwealth Games on the Gold Coast.

== Financial implications ==
The estimated cost of the 2010 Commonwealth Games in Delhi was US$11 billion, according to Business Today magazine. The initial total budget estimated by the Indian Olympic Association in 2003 was US$250 million. In 2010, however, the official total budget soon escalated to an estimated US$1.8 billion, a figure which excluded non-sports-related infrastructure development. The 2010 Commonwealth Games is reportedly the most expensive Commonwealth Games ever.

An analysis conducted by PricewaterhouseCoopers on the 2002, 2006, 2014 and 2018 Commonwealth Games found that each dollar spent by governments on operating costs, games venues and athletes' villages generated US$2 for the host city or state economies, with an average of more than 18,000 jobs generated by each of the events. Additionally, all four cities enjoyed long-term improvements to transport or other infrastructure through hosting the Games, while some also benefited from the revival of struggling precincts.

An analysis conducted by Ernst & Young found that the 2018 Commonwealth Games generated an estimated economic impact of $2.5 billion, while the venues constructed and upgraded for the Games generated over $60 million in economic benefit annually to the Gold Coast, with the success of the 2018 Commonwealth Games credited with helping Brisbane to secure hosting rights for the 2032 Summer Olympics.

== Notable competitors ==
Lawn bowler Willie Wood from Scotland was the first competitor to have competed in seven Commonwealth Games, from 1974 to 2002, a record equalled in 2014 by Isle of Man cyclist Andrew Roche. They have both been surpassed by David Calvert of Northern Ireland who in 2018 attended his 11th games.

Sitiveni Rabuka was a prime minister of Fiji. Beforehand he represented Fiji in shot put, hammer throw, discus and the decathlon at the 1974 British Commonwealth Games held in Christchurch, New Zealand.

Greg Yelavich, a sports shooter from New Zealand, has won 12 medals in seven games from 1986 to 2010.

Lawn bowler Robert Weale has represented Wales in 8 Commonwealth Games, 1986–2014, winning 2 gold, 3 silver and 1 bronze.

Nauruan weightlifter Marcus Stephen won twelve medals at the Games between 1990 and 2002, of which seven gold, and was elected President of Nauru in 2007. His performance has helped place Nauru (the smallest independent state in the Commonwealth, at 21 km^{2} (8.1 sq mi) and with a population of fewer than 9,400 in 2011) in twenty-second place on the all-time Commonwealth Games medal table.

Australian swimmer Ian Thorpe has won 10 Commonwealth Games gold medals and 1 silver medal. At the 1998 Commonwealth Games in Kuala Lumpur, he won 4 gold medals. At the 2002 Commonwealth Games in Manchester, he won 6 gold medals and 1 silver medal.

Chad le Clos, South Africa's most decorated swimmer, has won 18 medals from four Commonwealth Games (2010, 2014, 2018 & 2022), seven of which are gold. At the 2014 Commonwealth Games in Glasgow, he won two gold medals, one silver medal, and four bronze medals. At the 2018 Commonwealth Games in Gold Coast, he won three golds, a silver and a bronze.

English actor Jason Statham took part as a diver in the 1990 Commonwealth Games.

At the 2022 Commonwealth Games in Birmingham, Australian singer Cody Simpson won a gold medal as a swimmer at the men's 4 × 100 metre freestyle relay and a silver at the men's 4 × 100 metre medley relay.

Niuean prime minister Dalton Tagelagi competed in lawn bowls at the 2022 Commonwealth Games while in office, having also competed in 2014 and 2018.

== Media coverage ==
The BBC was the principal broadcaster from 1954 to 2022 apart from the first four editions in 1930, 1934, 1938 and 1950. On 19 December 2025, it is announced that the 2026 Commonwealth Games in Glasgow will be shown live on TNT Sports for the first time on paywall television instead of on free-to-air television. Channel 5 will show the daily highlights for the 2026 edition.

== See also ==
- Commonwealth Youth Games
- Commonwealth Mountain and Ultradistance Running Championships
- List of Commonwealth Games venues
- List of stamps depicting the Commonwealth Games
- List of Commonwealth Games mascots

== Sources ==
- Brown, Geoff and Hogsbjerg, Christian. Apartheid is not a Game: Remembering the Stop the Seventy Tour campaign. London: Redwords, 2020. ISBN 9781912926589.
