= List of British anthems =

This is a list of national and regional anthems used in the countries of the United Kingdom, crown dependencies and British overseas territories.

== United Kingdom songs ==
=== Countries ===
| Constituent country | Song | Year adopted | Lyricist(s) | Composer(s) | Audio |
|---|---|---|---|---|---|
| England | "Jerusalem" | Unofficial (Note: Used at the Commonwealth Games. See National anthem of England for further information.) | William Blake | Sir Hubert Parry | |
| Northern Ireland | "Londonderry Air" | Unofficial (Note: Used at the Commonwealth Games. See National anthem of Northern Ireland for further information.) | Jane Ross | Unknown | |
| Scotland | "Flower of Scotland" | Unofficial (Note: Used at most sporting events, including the Commonwealth Games. See National anthem of Scotland for further information.) | Roy Williamson | | |
| Wales | "Hen Wlad Fy Nhadau" ("Land of my Fathers") | Unofficial (Note: De facto national anthem) | Evan James | James James | |

=== Traditional counties ===
| Entity | Song | Year adopted | Lyricist(s) | Composer(s) | Audio |
|---|---|---|---|---|---|
| Cornwall | The Song of the Western Men (Trelawney) | Unofficial | Robert Stephen Hawker | Louisa T. Clare | |
| County Durham | Blaydon Races | Unofficial | George Ridley | Unknown | |
| Cumberland | D'ye ken John Peel | Unofficial | John Woodcock Graves | Unknown | |
| Lincolnshire | The Lincolnshire Poacher | Unofficial | Unknown | Unknown | |
| Northumberland | Blaydon Races | Unofficial | George Ridley | Unknown | |
| Sussex | Sussex by the Sea | Unofficial | William Ward-Higgs | William Ward-Higgs | |
| Wiltshire | The Vly be on the Turmut | Unofficial | Unknown | Tom Gibson | |
| Yorkshire | On Ilkla Moor Baht 'at | Unofficial | Unknown | Thomas Clark | |

== Crown Dependencies songs ==
| Crown Dependencies | Song | Year adopted | Lyricist(s) | Composer(s) | Audio |
|---|---|---|---|---|---|
| Guernsey | "Sarnia Cherie" ("Dear Guernsey") | 1911 | George Deighton | Domenico Santangelo | |
| Isle of Man | "Arrane Ashoonagh Vannin" (O Land of Our Birth) | 2003 | William Henry Gill and John J. Kneen | William Henry Gill | |
| Jersey | "Beautiful Jersey" (Man Bieau P'tit Jèrri) | 2025 | Lindsay Lennox | Lindsay Lennox | |

== British overseas territories songs ==
| Territory | Song | Year adopted | Lyricist(s) | Composer(s) | Audio |
|---|---|---|---|---|---|
| Anguilla | "God Bless Anguilla" | 1981 | Unknown | | |
| Bermuda | "Hail to Bermuda" | 1984 | Bette Johns | | |
| Cayman Islands | "Beloved Isle Cayman" | 1993 | Leila Ross-Shier | | |
| Falkland Islands | "Song of the Falklands" | 1930 | Christopher Lanham | | |
| Gibraltar | "Gibraltar Anthem" | 1994 | Peter Emberley | | |
| Montserrat | "Motherland" | 1995 | Howard Fergus | George Irish | |
| Pitcairn Islands | "Come Ye Blessed" | Unknown (Unofficial) | Unknown | John Prindle Scott | |
| Pitcairn Islands | "We From Pitcairn Island" | 1962 | Melva Evans, L. A. J. Webster | Frederick M. Lehman | |
| Saint Helena | "My Saint Helena Island" | 1975 | Dave Mitchell | | |
| Turks and Caicos Islands | "This Land of Ours" | Unknown | Dr. Rev. Conrad Howell | | |
| British Virgin Islands | "Oh, Beautiful Virgin Islands" | 2013 | Ayana Hull | Ayana Hull and Kareem-Nelson Hull | |

== See also ==
- National anthem of the United Kingdom
- List of regional anthems
- List of national symbols of the United Kingdom, the Channel Islands and the Isle of Man
- Symbols of the British Overseas Territories
- List of British flags
- Armorial of the United Kingdom
