= National anthem of Northern Ireland =

Various songs used as the Northern Ireland anthem

There is no official anthem which represents only Northern Ireland.

== Londonderry Air ==
- "Londonderry Air" is played as the anthem of Northern Ireland at the Commonwealth Games. "Danny Boy" is a popular set of lyrics to the tune.

== God Save the King ==
- As part of the United Kingdom, Northern Ireland uses "God Save the King" as its national anthem, including at international sporting events.

== Ireland's Call ==
"Ireland's Call" is used by the Ireland rugby union team, Ireland rugby league team, Ireland cricket team and Ireland field hockey teams. All of these teams represent the entire island of Ireland.

== Amhrán na bhFiann ==
"Amhrán na bhFiann" ("The Soldier's Song"), the national anthem of the Republic of Ireland, is used by some organisations operating on the island of Ireland, such as the Gaelic Athletic Association.

== See also ==
- Flag of Northern Ireland
