= List of stamps depicting the Commonwealth Games =

The Commonwealth Games has been commemorated in the postage stamps of a number of nations. Unlike the Olympic Games the first celebrations of the Commonwealth Games did not appear on stamps. The first Commonwealth Games stamps were issued in connection with the Games in Cardiff in 1958, although there were philatelic labels issued for Games prior to 1958.

== 1934 London ==
- New Zealand, 1990, SG 1559 (shows Jack Lovelock running in the 1934 British Empire Games)
- New Zealand, 1990, SG MS1561 (mentions the 1934 British Empire Games on the miniature sheet)

== 1938 Sydney ==
- Australia, 1938, Philatelic label
- Australia, 1938, 150th anniversary of New South Wales, SG 193-195 (Not Commonwealth Games, but the games were held in conjunction with the 150th anniversary of New South Wales)

== 1958 Cardiff ==
- Great Britain, 1958, SG 567-569

== 1962 Perth ==
- Australia, 1962, SG 346-347
- Australia, 2006, SG MS2599 (1962 stamps reprinted in miniature sheet in conjunction with 2006 Commonwealth Games)
- Papua & New Guinea, 1962, SG 39-41

== 1966 Kingston ==
- Jamaica, 1966, SG 254–257, MS258
- Kenya Uganda Tanzania, 1966, SG 227-230

== 1970 Edinburgh ==
- Calf of Man, 1970, British local issue not listed in Stanley Gibbons (set of 5 values and Miniature Sheet)
- Gambia, 1970, SG 262-264
- Great Britain, 1970, SG 832-834
- Kenya Uganda Tanzania, 1970, SG 280-283
- Malawi, 1970, SG 351–354, MS355
- Swaziland, 1970, SG 180-183

== 1974 Christchurch ==
- Cook Islands, 1974, SG 455–459, MS460
- Fiji, 1974, SG 489-491
- New Zealand, 1974, SG 1041–1045, MS1046
- Samoa, 1974, SG 422-425
- Tonga, 1974, SG 469–478, O109-O111

== 1978 Edmonton ==
- Canada, 1978, SG 908–909, 918-921
- Isle of Man, 1978, SG 140
- Kenya, 1978, SG 127-130
- Tonga, 1978, SG 665-665, O163-O165
- Turks & Caicos Islands. 1978, SG 509–512, MS513
- Uganda, 1978, SG 210–213, MS214
- Uganda, 1979, SG 263-266 (Commonwealth Games set overprinted "Uganda Liberated 1979")

== 1982 Brisbane ==
- Anguilla, 1982, SG 530-533
- Ascension Island, 1982, SG 326-327
- Australia, 1982, SG 859–862, MS863
- Australia, 1982, SG MS863 (overprinted with "ANPex 82 National Stamp Exhibition 1982" on non-stamp portion of Miniature Sheet)
- Australia, 1982, Aerogram with printed stamp
- Australia, 2006, SG MS2599b 1982 stamps reprinted in Miniature Sheet in conjunction with 2006 Commonwealth Games
- Falkland Islands, 1982, SG 431-432
- Great Britain, 1982, Commemorative Sheet issued for Stampex 82
- Great Britain, 2012, stamp issued as part of Diamond Jubilee set shows the Queen at the Brisbane Games in 1982
- Guyana, 1982, SG 1005
- Kenya, 1984, SG 457
- Papua New Guinea, 1982, SG 460-463
- St Helena, 1982, SG 401-402
- Samoa, 1982, SG 625-628
- Solomon Islands, 1982, SG 473–474, MS476
- Tonga, 1982, SG 823-824
- Tristan da Cunha, 1982, SG 335-336

=== 1982 Commonwealth Table Tennis Championships, Bombay ===
- India, 1980, SG 967

== 1986 Edinburgh ==
- Eynhallow, 1986, British local issue not listed in Stanley Gibbons (set of 2 values)
- Great Britain, 1986, SG 1328-1331
- Guernsey, 1986, SG 371-376
- Isle of Man, 1986, SG 306-309
- Kenya, 1986, stamps prepared but not issued. (A few rural post offices did issue the stamps, so used examples of the 1/- value have been seen. One mint set of all 5 values is known in the collection of a German stamp collector.)
- Tonga, 1986, SG 948-949

== 1990 Auckland ==
- New Zealand, 1989, SG 1530–1537, MS1538
- Tanzania, 1990, SG 817–820, MS821
- Tonga, 1990, SG 1065-1069

== 1994 Victoria ==
- Canada, 1994, SG 1590-1595
- Hong Kong, 1994, SG 783-786
- Nauru, 1994, SG 421

== 1998 Kuala Lumpur ==
- Fiji, 1998, SG 1026–1029, MS1030
- Malaysia, 1994, SG 548-549
- Malaysia, 1995, SG 575-576
- Malaysia, 1996, SG 627-630
- Malaysia, 1997, SG 668-671
- Malaysia, 1998, SG MS678
- Malaysia, 1998, SG 693–708, MS709
- Malaysia, 1998, SG MS715/MS716
- Malaysia, 1998, Aerogram with printed stamp
- Malaysia, 1998, pre-printed envelope for closing ceremony
- Nauru, 1998, SG 483–486, MS487
- Norfolk Island, 1998, SG 679–681, MS682
- Papua New Guinea, 1998, SG 841-844

== 2002 Manchester ==
- Australia, 2002, Aerogram with printed stamp
- British Virgin Islands, 2003, SG 1116-1117
- Great Britain, 2002, SG 2299-2303
- Isle of Man, 2002, SG 976-981
- Norfolk Island, 2002, SG 809-812
- Pabay, 2002, British Local Issue not listed by Stanley Gibbons (3 values in a Miniature Sheet)
- St Kitts, 2002, SG 718-719 (stamps feature Kim Collins)
- Samoa, 2003, SG 1126 (stamp shows Beatrice Faumuina, the Commonwealth Games Discus champion from New Zealand)
- Tonga, 2002, SG 1523-1526

== 2006 Melbourne ==
- Australia, 2005, SG 2522 (stamp issued for the Queen's 79th Birthday, featured Commonwealth Games logo)
- Australia, 2006, SG 2575, 2596–2598, MS2599, MS2599c, 2600
- Australia, 2006, SG MS2607 (Opening Ceremony Miniature Sheet)
- Australia, 2006, SG MS2608-MS2621 (14 miniature sheets featuring Australian Gold Medal winners)
- Australia, 2006, SG MS2622 (Closing Ceremony Miniature Sheet)
- Australia, 2006, SG MS2623 ("Most Memorable Moment" Miniature Sheet (Women's Marathon))
- Norfolk Island, 2006, SG 946-947 (Commonwealth Games Baton arrival in Norfolk Island)
- Norfolk Island, 2006, SG 948-950
- Uganda, 2007, SG 2669-2670 two stamps issued as part of the set for Commonwealth Heads of Government Meeting in Kampala, featuring Ugandan athletes at the 2006 Commonwealth Games, namely Dorcus Inzikuru, the gold-medallist in the women's steeplechase, and Boniface Toroitich Kiprop the gold-medallist in the men's 10,000 metres
- Samoa, 2007, SG 1201, MS1204 (featuring Ele Opeloge, the Commonwealth Games Women's Weightlifting Champion from Samoa)

=== 2008 Pune (Commonwealth Youth Games) ===
- India, 2008, 4 stamps and Miniature Sheet SG 2509–2512, MS2513

== 2010 Delhi ==
- Australia, 2006, miniature sheet SG MS2622 stamps feature Delhi 2010 contribution to the Melbourne Commonwealth Games closing ceremony
- Gibraltar, 2010, miniature sheet issued 20 October 2010
- Guernsey, 2010, stamps issued 23 September 2010
- India, 2008, stamp and miniature sheet SG 2516 miniature sheet not listed by Stanley Gibbons
- India 2010, 2 stamps and miniature sheet SG 2723–2724, MS2725
- India 2010, 2 stamps and miniature sheet SG 2735–2736, MS2737
- India 2010, 4 stamps and miniature sheet issued 3 October 2010
- Mozambique, 2010, 8 stamps and miniature sheet issued 30 November 2010
- Papua New Guinea, 2010, set of four stamps and miniature sheet issued 3 September 2010

=== 2011 Isle of Man (Commonwealth Youth Games) ===
- Isle of Man, 2011, miniature sheet issued 19 August 2011

== 2014 Glasgow ==
- Sri Lanka, 2007, 2 stamps SG 1920-1921 (issued for CGF General Assembly held in Sri Lanka in 2007, where the Games were awarded to Glasgow in 2014)
- Sri Lanka, 2013, 4 stamps (issued for the Glasgow 2014 Queen's Baton Relay visit to Sri Lanka; these however are "personalized stamps" which are valid for postage, but not issued to the general public)

== 2018 Gold Coast ==
- St Kitts, 2011, 1 stamp (issued for CGF General Assembly held in St Kitts in 2011, where the Games were awarded to Gold Coast in 2018)
