= George Irish =

Montserratian academic (c. 1942 – 2019)

James Alfred George Patrick Irish, generally known as George Irish or J. A. George Irish (c. 1942 – February 12, 2019), was a Montserratian academic, musician, composer of the national song, community leader and social engineer.

Irish was a graduate of the University of the West Indies (UWI), and the first recipient of that institution's Ph.D. degree in Spanish. He taught at UWI, where he headed the Department of Spanish, in the Dominican Republic at the Universidad Autonoma de Santo Domingo (UASD), and in the United States at the City University of New York (CUNY) where he was Professor of Caribbean and Latin American Studies.

Irish also headed the Caribbean Research Center and the Office of International Programs at Medgar Evers College in Brooklyn, New York (part of CUNY). He was Editor-in-Chief and founder of the scholarly journal of Caribbean studies, Wadabagei, and President of the Caribbean Diaspora Press Inc. and Caribbean American Research Foundation Inc. in New York.

He was co-founder and Chancellor of the Universidad Popular de Desarrollo Sostenible de Las Americas (UNIPOP) and founding Board member of the International Center for Sustainable Development (CIDES) in Panama.

He authored/edited thirty two (32) books including:

- Visions of Liberation in the Caribbean, 1992 (ISBN 978-9768039064)
- Life in a Colonial Crucible, 1991
- Growth of a Revolutionary Consciousness, 1990
- Evolution of a Global and Diasporic Vision
- Discourses from Alliouagana and the Diaspora
