= Ireland national field hockey team =

Ireland national field hockey team may refer to:

- Ireland men's national field hockey team
- Ireland women's national field hockey team
