= National Song of Montserrat =

Motherland
- Coat of arms of Montserrat
- Territorial anthem of Montserrat
- Lyrics: Howard Fergus; Edited by Dominick Archer
- Music: George Irish
- Adopted: 2013
- Preceded by: Montserrat, My Country

Audio sample
- Digital instrumental version (one verse and chorus): file; help

"Motherland" is the national song of the British overseas territory of Montserrat. It was composed by academic J. A. George Irish and written by former acting Governor of Montserrat Sir Howard A. Fergus. "Motherland" was officially passed into law by the Legislative Assembly of Montserrat as the Territorial Song of Montserrat in 2014, after an extensive public search for a national song through open participation by Montserratians at home and abroad.

J. A. George Irish and Howard A. Fergus were the first two recipients of Montserrat's historic national award of the Order of Excellence, the highest honour granted to living citizens for their distinguished careers in education and community leadership. The official rendition submitted to the government for its archives and public usage is performed by the international artist Ayanna Irish.

== History ==
The original version of the song was written as an unofficial "nationalist anthem" titled "O Emerald Isle" to express a nascent cultural pride that emerged in the early 1970s as part of an educational and cultural revival in Montserrat under the leadership of the young academic, Dr. J. A. George Irish, in his role as the academic and administrative Head of the newly established local Extra-Mural Branch of the University of the West Indies.

The Montserrat University Center became the dynamic hub of a wide range of cultural activities involving educators and artists such as: Howard Fergus, Edith Bellot and Joy Nanton in History and/or music; Vincent B. Browne, David Edgecombe, John Stanley Weekes, Dorcas White and Anita Ince in theater and folklore; Mary Griffin and Midge Kocen in theater arts; W. "Willie Kinnie" O'Garro and Jewelline Roberts in dance; Clifford Tuitt and Carol Tuitt in costume arts; Charles Jackie Dangler, Desmond "Flasher" Daley and "Out-of-port" Aymer in steelpan music; Samuel "Black Sam" Aymer, Donald Douglas, George Allen, George Harper, Joseph Jackman, Reginald Ryan, James Frederick, Eric Fergus and his parents Steamer and Molly Fergus and John White in folk music.

This cultural renaissance was centred on the Emerald Community Singers, Montserrat Theater Group, Alliouagana Dancers, Alliouagana Drummers, Alliouagana Arts Festival, the regional Carifesta movement, Montserrat Secondary School Choir, local church choirs, Heavenly Organs Steel Orchestra, and other local folk groups.

== Lyrics ==
Oh Montserrat, proud Motherland
Your children raise your standard high.
In toil and tears to serve you well,
The emerald jewel from God’s hand.

Chorus:
Oh Montserrat, by nature blest
To you your children sing
Come well or woe, come friend or foe
To you your people cling.

Rise up and make our country great
With art and skill and sacrifice
With masque and drum we celebrate,
Triumphant masters of our faith

Chorus

We sing our land in harmony
May God be her eternal guard
And make Montserrat a house of hope,
A haven in the Carib Sea.

Chorus

No pestilence shall mar your shore
No fount of sadness overwhelm
A people striving under God
Their spirits free forevermore.

Chorus

== See also ==
- List of British anthems
