= Come Ye Blessed =

Anthem of the Pitcairn Islands and Norfolk Island

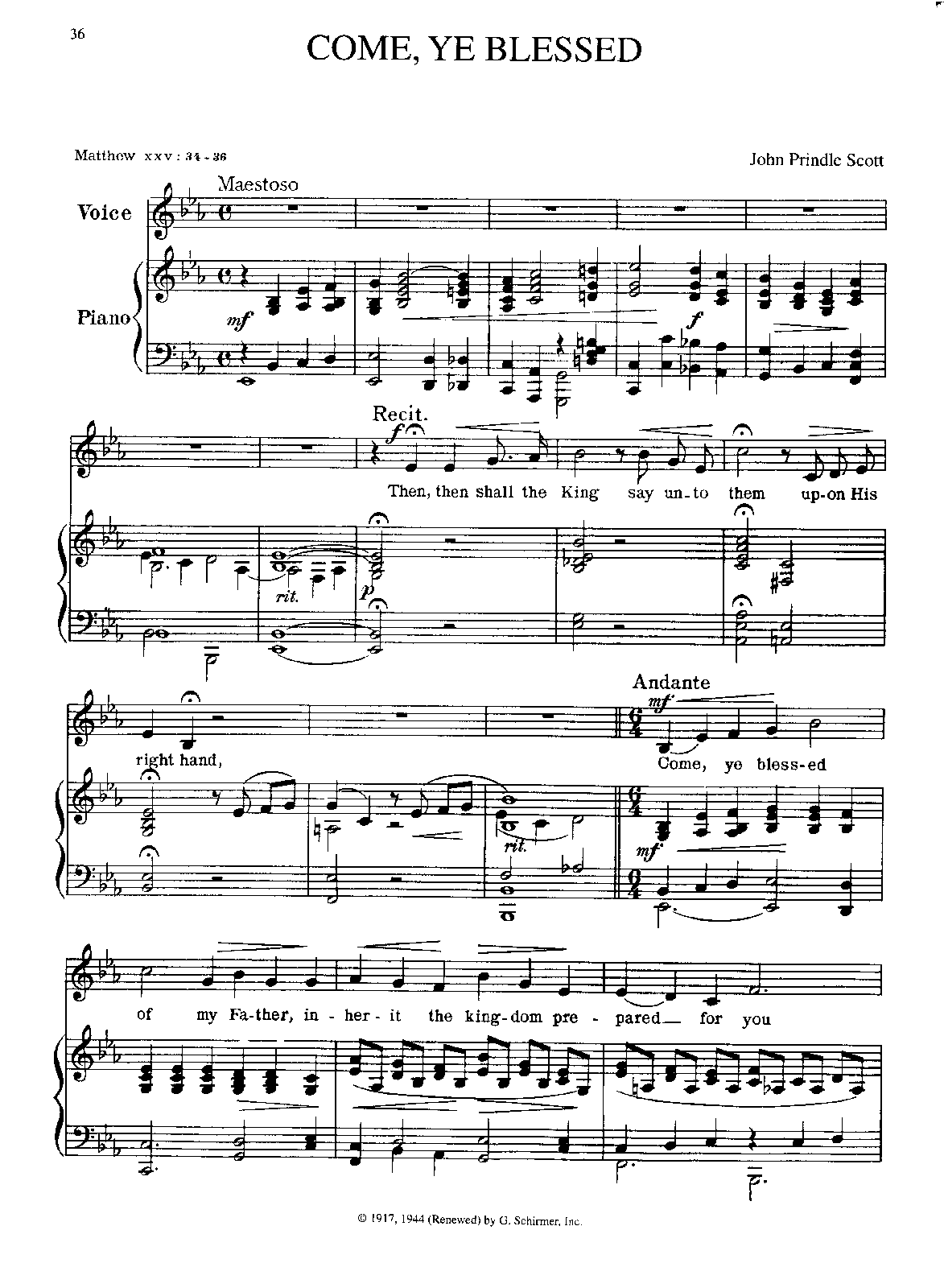
- Anthem of the Pitcairn Islands and Norfolk Island
- Music: John Prindle Scott

"Come Ye Blessed" is a territorial song of the British overseas territory of the Pitcairn Islands, and is the official territorial song of the Australian territory of Norfolk Island and is sung at most island events.

The lyrics are taken from Matthew 25, verses 34–36 and 40. The music was composed by John Prindle Scott (1877–1932) and published in 1917.

It is also known as the "Pitcairn Anthem" in Norfolk Island, suggesting it may have been already in use and brought by Pitcairn Islanders upon their arrival in 1856.

"God Save the King" remains the official national and royal anthem of the Pitcairn Islands and the official royal anthem of Norfolk Island.

== Lyrics in English ==
Then shall the King
Say unto them
On his right hand:
Come ye blessed of my Father
Inherit the kingdom prepared for you
From the foundation of the world
I was hunger’d and ye gave me meat,
I was thirsty and ye gave me drink
I was a stranger and ye took me in,
Naked and ye clothed me,
I was sick and ye visited me,
I was in prison and ye came unto me
In as much ye have done it unto one of the least of
These my brethren
Ye have done it unto me,
Ye have done it unto me.

== Lyrics in Pitkern ==
Then gwen daa King
Tal unto dem
Orn hes rait haan:
Kam ye blessed o mais Faada
Inherit daa kingdum prepared f' yuu
Fram daa foundayshun o t' werl
I wos hungaa'd en ye giw mii miit,
I wos thirstii en ye giw mii a drink
I wos a strienja en ye tek mii iin,
Noe klorth en ye klorthd mii,
I wos sor en ye wisitiid mii,
I wos iin pris'n en ye kam unto mii
Iin es mach ye gat dan et unto wan o daa liis o
Thiis mais brethren
Ye gat dan et unto mii,
Ye gat dan et unto mii.

== See also ==
- List of British anthems
