= This Land of Ours =

Territorial anthem of the Turks and Caicos Islands

- National song of the Turks and Caicos Islands
- Lyrics: Dr. Rev. Conrad Howell
- Music: Dr. Rev. Conrad Howell

"This Land of Ours" is the local national song of the Turks and Caicos Islands, composed by Dr. Rev. Conrad Howell (12 December 1962 – 11 September 2015). As a British Overseas Territory, the official national anthem is "God Save the King".

== Lyrics ==
I
O we salute this land of ours
Our country we declare
This promise land with its beauties grand
Though small it is our own

Chorus:
Turks & Caicos, Turks & Caicos
Our country firm and free
Our allegiance Turks & Caicos
We pledge and we affirm.

II
Our people forged and blend
With multiplicity
Of race and kind and creed and tongue
United by our goals

From the east, west, north and south
Our banks and oceans meet
Surrounding sands and hills of glee
Our pristine beauties see

Chorus

III
We stand with courage brave
To maintain this land of ours
With Islands scattered here and there
With trust in God we stand

Chorus

== See also ==
- List of British anthems
