= Hail to Bermuda =

Regional anthem of Bermuda

- Territorial anthem of Bermuda
- Also known as: "This Island's Mine"
- Lyrics: Bette Johns, 1984
- Music: Bette Johns, 1984

Audio sample
- Audio Instrumental: file; help

"Hail to Bermuda", also known as "This Island's Mine", is the territorial anthem of Bermuda, written and composed by Bette Johns. The official anthem is the national anthem of the United Kingdom, "God Save the King", as the island is a British overseas territory.

The anthem has been used during competitions where multiple British overseas territories are competing, such as the 2011 Island Games.

== History ==
The anthem was written and composed by Bette Johns for a competition organised by the government of Bermuda in 1984. A jury selected her entry as the winner, and it was first performed on Bermuda Day, on 24 May 1984.

However, by 1985, the anthem had lost significant attention, with The Bermudian citing difficulties in arranging the song for school choirs, regimental bands and orchestras and a lack of interest in doing so. In response, Senator Gerald Simons and his Community Services staff launched an initiative not to let the song die out, offering a limited budget to anyone skilled enough who would be prepared to arrange the song in time for the 1985 Heritage Month. Professional arranger Paul Christianson, from Washington, United States, but with contacts in Bermuda, responded to the appeal, offering to arrange the song for free, as long as the professionals involved were remunerated. The anthem was then orchestrated for various musical acts by Christianson.

Despite being adopted as the island's anthem, the official anthem remains "God Save the King". "Hail to Bermuda" is usually used when Bermuda requires a unique anthem to be played.

== Lyrics ==
I
Hail to Bermuda,
My island in the sun.
Sing out in glory
To the nation we've become.
We've grown from heart to heart, (Note: Sometimes written "We go from heart to heart".)
And strength to strength,
The privilege is mine
To sing long live Bermuda,
Because this island's mine!

II
Hail to Bermuda,
My homeland dear to me.
This is my own land
Built on faith
And unity.
We've grown from heart to heart
And strength to strength,
For Loyalty is Prime
So sing long live Bermuda, (Note: Sometimes written "And sing long live Bermuda" or "To sing long live Bermuda".)
Because this island's mine!

== See also ==
- List of British anthems
