= My Saint Helena Island =

Unofficial regional anthem of Saint Helena

- Regional anthem of Saint Helena
- Lyrics: Dave Mitchell, 1975
- Music: Dave Mitchell, 1975

My Saint Helena Island is the unofficial regional anthem of Saint Helena. It was written by Dave Mitchell in 1975, after persuasion from the inhabitants of Saint Helena. As a British Overseas Territory, the national anthem is "God Save the King".

== Lyrics ==
My heart is drifting southward
To my home down in the sea
To the isle of St Helena
Where my loved ones wait for me
Long since I left it
But I'll soon be going home
To my St Helena island
And swear I'll never roam

Diamonds they are pretty
So is your fancy cars
But St Helena island
Is much prettier by far
All the wonders of this world
I'm told they number seven
But St Helena Island
Is the nearest one to heaven

Diamonds they are pretty
So is your fancy cars
But St Helena island
Is much prettier by far
Someday if the Lord above
Comes out of heaven's gate
𝄆 I'm sure He'll pick St Helena
And use it as His place 𝄇

== See also ==
- List of British anthems
