= Ko e Iki he Lagi =

National anthem of Niue

English: The Lord in Heaven
- The coat of arms of Niue
- National anthem of Niue
- Lyrics: Unknown
- Music: Unknown; prepared by Sioeli Fusikata
- Adopted: 1974; 52 years ago

Audio sample
- Instrumental version, 2023: file; help

Original version, 1974

"Ko e Iki he Lagi" (English: "The Lord in Heaven"), also titled in English as "Lord in heaven, Thou art merciful", is the national anthem of Niue. It was adopted in 1974, when Niue became a self-governing state within the realm of New Zealand.

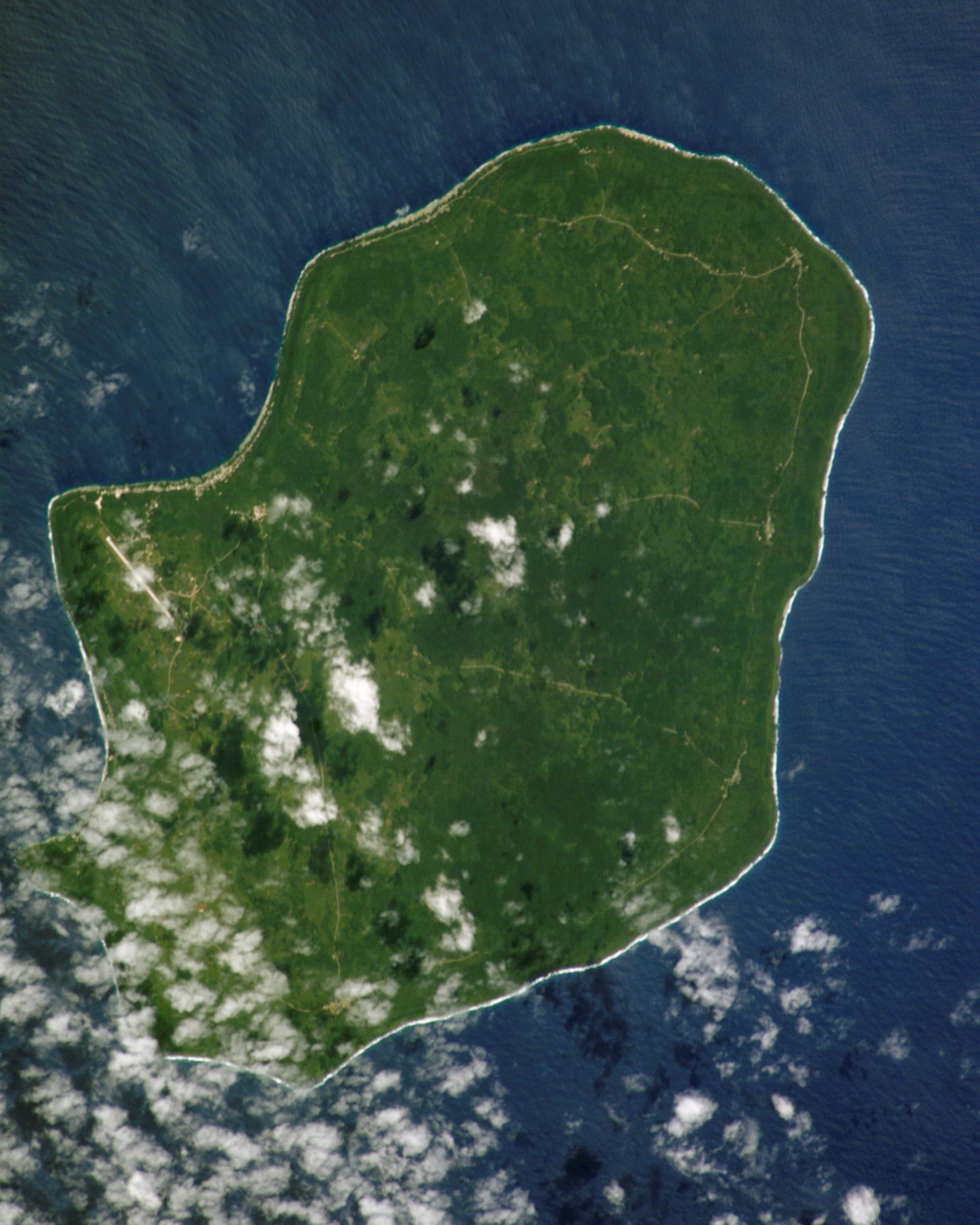
NASA astronaut image of Niue in the Pacific Ocean

== History ==
During Niue's history as a territory of New Zealand, the national anthem of Niue was New Zealand's "God Defend New Zealand". "God Save the King" was (and still is) the royal anthem of the monarchy of New Zealand. "Ko e Iki he Lagi" was created before the 1970s. It is not known who composed the words or the music, but it is known that it was prepared (i.e. set down on paper) by Sioeli Fusikata. It had already become a popular song on Niue, but the opportunity had rarely arisen for people to sing it at public events. In the 1963 South Pacific Games, Niue used the Flag of New Zealand, in keeping with the rest of the colonies of the British Empire not using the Union Jack at the games. Niue also used "Ko e Iki he Lagi" as their anthem rather than "God Defend New Zealand", because the organisers had requested that "identifying tunes" be used to represent nations at the games instead of recognised national anthems. However, Niue did not win any of the events, so "Ko e Iki he Lagi" was not heard publicly at the games.

In 1974, the same year that Niue's new constitution granted Niue the status of free association with New Zealand upon the passage of the Niue Constitution Act 1974 in the Parliament of New Zealand, Niue adopted "Ko e Iki he Lagi" as their national anthem, superseding "God Defend New Zealand". "God Save the King" was retained as the royal anthem to be used when the monarch is present in Niue.

== Lyrics ==
Niuean original

Ko e Iki he Lagi
Kua fakaalofa (Note: Also written faka'alofa.) mai
Ki Niue nei, ki Niue nei
Kua pule totonu
E Patuiki toatu (Note: Sometimes written Kehe patuiki toatu or 'E he patuili to 'atu.)
Kua pule okooko (Note: Also written oko'oko.) ki Niue nei

Ki Niue nei, ki Niue nei
Ki Niue nei, ki Niue nei

Kua pule okooko ki Niue nei
Kua pule ki Niue nei

IPA transcription (Note: See Help:IPA, Niuean language § Phonology and Niuean language § Orthography.)

[ko e i.ki he la.ŋi]
[ku.a fa.ka.a.lo.fa mai̯]
[ki ni̯u.e nei̯ ki ni̯u.e nei̯]
[ku.a pu.le to.to.nu]
[e pa.tu.i.ki to.a.tu]
[ku.a pu.le o.ko.o.ko ki ni̯u.e nei̯]

[ki ni̯u.e nei̯ ki ni̯u.e nei̯]
[ki ni̯u.e nei̯ ki ni̯u.e nei̯]

[ku.a pu.le o.ko.o.ko ki ni̯u.e nei̯]
[ku.a pu.le ki ni̯u.e nei̯]

English translation

The Lord in Heaven
Who loves
Niue, Niue
Who rules kindly
The Almighty
Who rules completely over Niue

Over Niue, Over Niue
Over Niue, Over Niue

Who rules completely over Niue
Who rules over Niue

== See also ==
- List of national anthems
