= Seychelles at the 2025 World Aquatics Championships =

- Flag of Seychelles
- World Aquatics code: SEY
- National federation: Seychelles Swimming Association

in Singapore
- Competitors: 3 in 2 sports
- Medals: Gold 0 Silver 0 Bronze 0 Total 0

World Aquatics Championships appearances
- 1973; 1975; 1978; 1982; 1986; 1991; 1994; 1998; 2001; 2003; 2005; 2007; 2009; 2011; 2013; 2015; 2017; 2019; 2022; 2023; 2024; 2025

Seychelles competed at the 2025 World Aquatics Championships in Singapore from July 11 to August 3, 2025.

== Competitors ==
The following is the list of competitors in the Championships.

Sport	Men	Women	Total
Open water swimming	1	0	1
Swimming	1	1	2
Total	2	1	3

== Open water swimming ==
Men

Athlete	Event	Heat		Semi-final		Final	
Athlete	Event	Time	Rank	Time	Rank	Time	Rank
Damien Payet	Men's 5 km	—				1:07:22.5	66

== Swimming ==
Seychelles entered 2 swimmers.

Men

Athlete	Event	Heat		Semi-final		Final	
Athlete	Event	Time	Rank	Time	Rank	Time	Rank
Adam Moncherry	50 m freestyle	23.88	69	Did not advance			
Adam Moncherry	50 m butterfly	24.84	53	Did not advance			

Women

Athlete	Event	Heat		Semi-final		Final	
Athlete	Event	Time	Rank	Time	Rank	Time	Rank
Aaliyah Palestrini	50 m freestyle	29.18	77	Did not advance			
Aaliyah Palestrini	50 m backstroke	32.15	56	Did not advance			
