= Morocco at the 2025 World Aquatics Championships =

- Flag of Morocco
- World Aquatics code: MAR
- National federation: Royal Moroccan Swimming Federation
- Website: frmnatation.com

in Singapore
- Competitors: 5 in 2 sports
- Medals: Gold 0 Silver 0 Bronze 0 Total 0

World Aquatics Championships appearances
- 1973; 1975; 1978; 1982; 1986; 1991; 1994; 1998; 2001; 2003; 2005; 2007; 2009; 2011; 2013; 2015; 2017; 2019; 2022; 2023; 2024; 2025

Morocco is competing at the 2025 World Aquatics Championships in Singapore from 11 July to 3 August 2025.

== Competitors ==
The following is the list of competitors in the Championships.

Sport	Men	Women	Total
Open water swimming	1	1	2
Swimming	2	1	3
Total	3	2	5

== Open water swimming ==
Men

Athlete	Event	Heat		Semifinal		Final	
Athlete	Event	Time	Rank	Time	Rank	Time	Rank
Ilias El Fallaki	3 km knockout sprints	17:57.90	18	Did not advance			
Ilias El Fallaki	5 km	—				1:03:47.40	55

Women

Athlete	Event	Final	
Athlete	Event	Time	Rank
Malak Meqdar	5 km	1:06:49.30	34
Malak Meqdar	10 km	2:20:59.90	35

== Swimming ==
Men

Athlete	Event	Heat		Semifinal		Final	
Athlete	Event	Time	Rank	Time	Rank	Time	Rank
Samy Boutouil	50 m breaststroke	27.78 NR	38	Did not advance			
Samy Boutouil	100 m breaststroke	1:04.02	53	Did not advance			
Marwane Sebbata	50 m freestyle	22.73	48	Did not advance			
Marwane Sebbata	100 m freestyle	50.04 NR	42	Did not advance			

Women

Athlete	Event	Heat		Semifinal		Final	
Athlete	Event	Time	Rank	Time	Rank	Time	Rank
Imane El Barodi	50 m breaststroke	32.68	39	Did not advance			
Imane El Barodi	50 m butterfly	27.47 NR	41	Did not advance			
