= List of Seychellois records in swimming =

The Seychellois records in swimming are the fastest ever performances of swimmers from Seychelles, which are recognised and ratified by the Seychelles Aquatic Federation (SAF).

All records were set in finals unless noted otherwise.

== Long Course (50 m) ==
=== Men ===
Event	Time		Name	Club	Date	Meet	Location	Ref
50 m freestyle	23.47	h	Adam Moncherry	Seychelles	25 July 2026	Commonwealth Games	Glasgow, Great Britain	
100 m freestyle	52.19		Kenny Roberts	Seychelles	August 1998	Indian Ocean Island Games	Saint-Denis, Réunion	
200 m freestyle	1:54.29		Kenny Roberts	Seychelles	August 1998	Indian Ocean Island Games	Saint-Denis, Réunion	
400 m freestyle	4:13.76		Simon Bachmann	Seychelles	27 August 2023	Indian Ocean Island Games	Antananarivo, Madagascar	
800 m freestyle	8:47.84	†	Simon Bachmann	As Monaco Natation	20 December 2019	PACA Open Winter Regional Qualifying Championships	Saint-Raphaël, France	
1500 m freestyle	16:28.86		Simon Bachmann	Seychelles	23 July 2019	Indian Ocean Island Games	Côte d'Or, Mauritius	
50 m backstroke	27.34		Amos Ferley	Aquafins	18 April 2026	National Age Group Championships	Victoria, Seychelles	
100 m backstroke	58.66		Benjamin Lo-Pinto	-	24 July 2014	Long Island Open	Long Island, United States	
200 m backstroke	2:08.42	h	Benjamin Lo-Pinto	Massachusetts Bay Marlins	14 July 2000	Long Island Open	Long Island, United States	
50 m breaststroke	29.21	h	Simon Bachmann	Girondins Bordeaux	17 June 2025	French Championships	Montpellier, France	
100 m breaststroke	1:04.34	h	Simon Bachmann	Girondins Bordeaux	14 June 2025	French Championships	Montpellier, France	
200 m breaststroke	2:28.12	h	Simon Bachmann	Girondins Bordeaux	11 December 2022	French Regional Winter Championships	Agen, France	
50 m butterfly	24.57		Adam Moncherry	Mahe Skimmers	18 July 2025	National Age Group Championships	Victoria, Seychelles	
100 m butterfly	55.73	h	Simon Bachmann	Girondins Bordeaux	1 June 2025	Jean-Boiteux Grand Prix	Mérignac, France	
200 m butterfly	2:03.31	h	Simon Bachmann	Seychelles	13 February 2024	World Championships	Doha, Qatar	
200 m individual medley	2:05.95	b	Simon Bachmann	Girondins Bordeaux	14 June 2023	French Regional Winter Championships	Agen, France	
400 m individual medley	4:41.42	h	Simon Bachmann	Seychelles	28 July 2019	World Championships	Gwangju, South Korea	
4×100 m freestyle relay	3:23.33			-	2016			
4×200 m freestyle relay	8:04.98			-	1999			
4×100 m medley relay	4:06.03			-	1999			

Legend: # – Record awaiting ratification by Seychelles Aquatic Federation; WR – World record; AF – African record;
Records not set in finals: h – heat; sf – semifinal; r – relay 1st leg; rh – relay heat 1st leg; b – B final; † – en route to final mark; so – swim-off; tt – time trial

=== Women ===
Event	Time		Name	Club	Date	Meet	Location	Ref
50 m freestyle	26.05	h	Felicity Passon	Seychelles	24 August 2019	African Games	Casablanca, Morocco	
100 m freestyle	56.90	h	Felicity Passon	Seychelles	8 April 2017	South African Championships	Durban, South Africa	
200 m freestyle	2:07.53	h	Felicity Passon	Seychelles	5 April 2017	South African Championships	Durban, South Africa	
400 m freestyle	4:26.59	h	Shrone Austin	Seychelles	10 August 2011	8th Indian Ocean Island Games	Victoria, Seychelles	
800 m freestyle	9:07.54	h	Shrone Austin	Seychelles	8 August 2011	8th Indian Ocean Island Games	Victoria, Seychelles	
1500 m freestyle								
50m backstroke	29.17		Felicity Passon	Seychelles	23 August 2019	African Games	Casablanca, Morocco	
100m backstroke	1:02.33	so	Alexus Laird	Seychelles	4 December 2015	AT&T US Nationals	Federal Way, United States	
200m backstroke	2:13.94	h	Felicity Passon	Tuks Swimming Club	21 February 2020	Grand Prix Invitational	Durban, South Africa	
50m breaststroke	33.87	h	Isabelle Labuschagne	Seychelles	12 March 2024	African Games	Accra, Ghana	
100m breaststroke	1:17.56	h	Shrone Austin	Seychelles	6 August 2011	8th Indian Ocean Island Games	Victoria, Seychelles	
200m breaststroke	2:49.77	h	Shrone Austin	Seychelles	7 August 2011	8th Indian Ocean Island Games	Victoria, Seychelles	
50m butterfly	27.23	h	Felicity Passon	Seychelles	22 August 2019	African Games	Casablanca, Morocco	
100m butterfly	1:00.61		Felicity Passon	Seychelles	23 August 2019	African Games	Casablanca, Morocco	
200m butterfly	2:23.82	h	Shrone Austin	Seychelles	7 August 2011	8th Indian Ocean Island Games	Victoria, Seychelles	
200m individual medley	2:25.62	h	Shrone Austin	Seychelles	7 August 2011	8th Indian Ocean Island Games	Victoria, Seychelles	
400m individual medley	5:04.54	h	Shrone Austin	Seychelles	6 August 2011	8th Indian Ocean Island Games	Victoria, Seychelles	
4×100m freestyle relay	4:04.19		Elizabeth Khema; Sofie Frichot; Aaliyah Palestrini; Felicity Passon	Seychelles	26 August 2023	Indian Ocean Island Games	Antananarivo, Madagascar	
4×200m freestyle relay	9:09.12			Seychelles	29 August 2023	Indian Ocean Island Games	Antananarivo, Madagascar	
4×100m medley relay	4:00.19		Felicity Passon; Aaliyah Palestrini; Khema Elizabeth; Therese Soukup	Seychelles	23 July 2019	Indian Ocean Island Games	Côte d'Or, Mauritius	

Legend: # – Record awaiting ratification by Seychelles Aquatic Federation; WR – World record; AF – African record;
Records not set in finals: h – heat; sf – semifinal; r – relay 1st leg; rh – relay heat 1st leg; b – B final; † – en route to final mark; so – swim-off; tt – time trial

=== Mixed relay ===
Event	Time		Name	Club	Date	Meet	Location	Ref
4×100 m freestyle relay	3:47.98	h	Felicity Passon (57.06); Simon Bachmann (54.17); Aaliyah Palestrini (1:01.75); Samuele Rossi (55.00)	Seychelles	27 July 2019	World Championships	Gwangju, South Korea	
4×100 m medley relay	4:17.93			Seychelles	30 August 2023	Indian Ocean Island Games	Antananarivo, Madagascar	

Legend: # – Record awaiting ratification by Seychelles Aquatic Federation; WR – World record; AF – African record;
Records not set in finals: h – heat; so – swim-off

== Short Course (25 m) ==
=== Men ===
Event	Time		Name	Club	Date	Meet	Location	Ref
50m freestyle	22.96	h	Adam Moncherry	Seychelles	14 December 2024	World Championships	Budapest, Hungary	
100m freestyle	51.03	h	Mathieu Bachmann	Seychelles	20 December 2021	World Championships	Abu Dhabi, United Arab Emirates	
200m freestyle	1:52.87	r	Simon Bachmann	Girondins Bordeaux	12 November 2023	TC Interclub Championships	Libourne, France	
400m freestyle	3:58.37	h	Simon Bachmann	Girondins Bordeaux	12 December 2019	French Championships	Angers, France	
800 m freestyle								
1500 m freestyle								
50m backstroke	26.88	r	Simon Bachmann	Girondins Bordeaux	28 October 2023	French Championships	Angers, France	
100m backstroke	57.95	r	Simon Bachmann	Girondins Bordeaux	12 November 2023	TC Interclub Championships	Libourne, France	
200m backstroke	2:24.88	h	Dean Hoffman	Seychelles	7 December 2014	World Championships	Doha, Qatar	
50m breaststroke	28.46	h	Simon Bachmann	Girondins Bordeaux	26 October 2025	French Championships	Taverny, France	
100m breaststroke	1:02.33	c	Simon Bachmann	Girondins Bordeaux	25 October 2025	French Championships	Taverny, France	
200m breaststroke	2:19.04		Simon Bachmann	Girondins Bordeaux	1 December 2023	French Regional Winter Championships	Agen, France	
50m butterfly	26.65	b	Adam Viktora	Seychelles	30 December 2013	Indian Ocean Meet	Saint-Paul, Réunion	
100 m butterfly								
200 m butterfly								
100m individual medley	57.23	h	Simon Bachmann	Girondins Bordeaux	31 October 2024	French Championships	Montpellier, France	
200m individual medley	2:03.20	h	Simon Bachmann	Girondins Bordeaux	29 October 2023	French Championships	Angers, France	
400 m individual medley	4:23.85	b	Simon Bachmann	As Monaco Natation	14 December 2019	French Championships	Angers, France	
4×50m freestyle relay	1:37.92		Dean Hoffman (24.63); Pierre André Adam (24.27); Steven Mangroo (25.31); Adam Viktora (23.71)	Seychelles	29 December 2014	Indian Ocean Meet	Saint-Paul, Réunion	
4×100m freestyle relay	3:38.16		Dean Hoffman (53.83); Pierre André Adam (55.80); Steven Mangroo (55.92); Adam Viktora (52.61)	Seychelles	28 December 2014	Indian Ocean Meet	Saint-Paul, Réunion	
4×200 m freestyle relay								
4×50m medley relay	1:52.98		Dean Hoffman (29.68); Pierre Andre Adam (31.48); Adam Viktora (26.54); Steven Mangroo (25.28)	Seychelles	30 December 2014	Indian Ocean Meet	Saint-Paul, Réunion	
4×100m medley relay	4:22.02	h	Dean Hoffman (1:06.34); Pierre-Andre Adam (1:08.14); Adam Moncherry (1:04.88); Justin Payet (1:02.66)	Seychelles	7 December 2014	World Championships	Doha, Qatar	

Legend: # – Record awaiting ratification by Seychelles Aquatic Federation; WR – World record; AF – African record;
Records not set in finals: h – heat; sf – semifinal; r – relay 1st leg; rh – relay heat 1st leg; b – B final; † – en route to final mark; so – swim-off; tt – time trial

=== Women ===
Event	Time		Name	Club	Date	Meet	Location	Ref
50m freestyle	25.64	h	Felicity Passon	Seychelles	11 December 2016	World Championships	Windsor, Canada	
100m freestyle	55.38	h	Felicity Passon	Seychelles	7 December 2016	World Championships	Windsor, Canada	
200m freestyle	2:02.89	h	Felicity Passon	Seychelles	6 December 2016	World Championships	Windsor, Canada	
400m freestyle	4:29.79	†	Shrone Austin	Seychelles	10 April 2008	World Championships	Manchester, Great Britain	
800m freestyle	9:06.81		Shrone Austin	Seychelles	10 April 2008	World Championships	Manchester, Great Britain	
1500 m freestyle								
50m backstroke	28.59	rh	Alexus Laird	Seychelles	4 December 2014	World Championships	Doha, Qatar	
100m backstroke	1:00.81	h	Felicity Passon	Seychelles	11 December 2018	World Championships	Hangzhou, China	
200m backstroke	2:17.71	h	Alexus Laird	Seychelles	8 December 2016	World Championships	Windsor, Canada	
50m breaststroke	37.34	h	Seychelles	9 April 2008	World Championships	Manchester, Great Britain		
100m breaststroke	1:27.12	h	Maria Marzocchi	Seychelles	5 December 2014	World Championships	Doha, Qatar	
200 m breaststroke								
50m butterfly	27.20	h	Felicity Passon	Seychelles	8 December 2016	World Championships	Windsor, Canada	
100m butterfly	59.99	h	Felicity Passon	Seychelles	10 December 2016	World Championships	Windsor, Canada	
200m butterfly	2:31.66		Aaliyah Palestrini	Sistemi Integrati per lo Sport Rome	25 February 2017	Campionato Regionale Di Categoria Selezione B (Ostia)	Rome, Italy	
100m individual medley	1:10.20	h	Aaliyah Palestrini	Sistemi Integrati per lo Sport Rome	18 December 2021	World Championships	Abu Dhabi, United Arab Emirates	
200m individual medley	2:24.84		Aaliyah Palestrini	Sistemi Integrati per lo Sport Rome	10 December 2017	Meeting Nazionale Roma Nuoto	Rome, Italy	
400m individual medley	5:18.35	h	Aaliyah Palestrini	Seychelles	11 February 2017	Manifestazione Regionale Inverno - Selezione A	Frosinone, Italy	
4×50 m freestyle relay								
4×100m freestyle relay	4:07.85	h	Alexus Laird (56.78); Anisha Payet (1:06.22); Maria Marzocchi (1:07.92); Felicity Passon (56.93)	Seychelles	5 December 2014	World Championships	Doha, Qatar	
4×200 m freestyle relay								
4×50 m medley relay								
4×100 m medley relay								

Legend: # – Record awaiting ratification by Seychelles Aquatic Federation; WR – World record; AF – African record;
Records not set in finals: h – heat; sf – semifinal; r – relay 1st leg; rh – relay heat 1st leg; b – B final; † – en route to final mark; so – swim-off; tt – time trial

=== Mixed relay ===
Event	Time		Name	Club	Date	Meet	Location	Ref
4×50 m freestyle relay	1:40.64	h	Dean Hoffman (24.31); Samuele Rossi (24.28); Alexus Laird (26.56); Felicity Passon (25.49)	Seychelles	7 December 2016	World Championships	Windsor, Canada	
4×50 m medley relay	1:51.50	h	Alexus Laird (28.59); Pierre-Andre Adam (30.11); Felicity Passon (28.63); Dean Hoffman (24.17)	Seychelles	4 December 2014	World Championships	Doha, Qatar	

Legend: # – Record awaiting ratification by Seychelles Aquatic Federation;
Records not set in finals: h – heat; so – swim-off
