= Swimming at the 2019 African Games – Women's 100 metre freestyle =

Women's 100 metre freestyle at the 2019 African Games
- Venue: Mohammed V Sports Complex – Olympic Pool
- Dates: 21 August (heats and final)
- Competitors: 22 from 16 nations
- Winning time: 55.13

Medalists
gold medal	Erin Gallagher	South Africa
silver medal	Farida Osman	Egypt
bronze medal	Emma Chelius	South Africa

The Women's 100 metre freestyle competition of the 2019 African Games was held on 21 August 2019.

== Records ==
Prior to the competition, the existing world and championship records were as follows.

	Name	Nation	Time	Location	Date
World record	Sarah Sjöström	Sweden	51.71	Budapest	23 July 2017
African record	Erin Gallagher	South Africa	54.23	Gold Coast	9 April 2018
Games record	Farida Osman	Egypt	55.41	Brazzaville	6 September 2015

The following new records were set during this competition.

Date	Event	Name	Nation	Time	Record
21 August	Final	Erin Gallagher	South Africa	55.13	GR

== Results ==
=== Heats ===
The heats were started on 21 August at 10:20.

Rank	Heat	Lane	Name	Nationality	Time	Notes
1	2	4	Erin Gallagher	South Africa	55.94	Q
2	3	4	Farida Osman	Egypt	56.96	Q
3	1	4	Emma Chelius	South Africa	57.60	Q
4	2	5	Amel Melih	Algeria	57.70	Q
5	3	3	Maria Brunlehner	Kenya	58.44	Q
6	1	5	Naomi Ruele	Botswana	58.77	Q
7	2	3	Jeanne Boutbien	Senegal	59.19	Q
8	3	6	Catarina Sousa	Angola	59.90	Q
9	1	3	Lina Khiyara	Morocco	59.96	
10	3	5	Yasmin Hassan	Egypt	1:00.49	
11	1	2	Robyn Lee	Zimbabwe	1:00.99	
12	2	6	Noura Mana	Morocco	1:01.16	
13	2	2	Nomvulo Mjimba	Zimbabwe	1:01.69	
14	3	2	Abibat Ogunbanwo	Nigeria	1:02.16	
15	1	6	Tessa Ip Hen Cheung	Mauritius	1:02.98	
16	2	7	Khema Elizabeth	Seychelles	1:04.17	
17	1	7	Lombe Mwape	Zambia	1:05.99	
18	3	7	Caitlin Loo	Botswana	1:07.70	
19	3	1	Chloe Sauvourel	Central African Republic	1:13.67	
20	2	8	Rahel Gebresilassie	Ethiopia	1:15.08	
21	3	8	Lina Selo	Ethiopia	1:16.86	
22	1	1	Roukaya Mahamane	Niger	1:20.03	

=== Final ===
The final was started on 21 August at 17:00.

Rank	Lane	Name	Nationality	Time	Notes
1st place, gold medalist(s)	4	Erin Gallagher	South Africa	55.13	GR
2nd place, silver medalist(s)	5	Farida Osman	Egypt	55.62	
3rd place, bronze medalist(s)	3	Emma Chelius	South Africa	55.86	
4	6	Amel Melih	Algeria	57.14	
5	2	Maria Brunlehner	Kenya	58.39	
6	7	Naomi Ruele	Botswana	59.30	
7	1	Jeanne Boutbien	Senegal	59.35	
8	8	Catarina Sousa	Angola	59.44	
