= Swimming at the 2019 African Games – Women's 50 metre butterfly =

Women's 50 metre butterfly at the 2019 African Games
- Venue: Mohammed V Sports Complex – Olympic Pool
- Dates: 22 August (heats and final)
- Competitors: 20 from 14 nations
- Winning time: 25.94

Medalists
gold medal	Farida Osman	Egypt
silver medal	Erin Gallagher	South Africa
bronze medal	Emma Chelius	South Africa

The Women's 50 metre butterfly competition of the 2019 African Games was held on 22 August 2019.

== Records ==
Prior to the competition, the existing world and championship records were as follows.

	Name	Nation	Time	Location	Date
World record	Sarah Sjöström	Sweden	24.43	Borås	5 July 2014
African record	Farida Osman	Egypt	25.39	Budapest	29 July 2017
Games record	Farida Osman	Egypt	26.27	Brazzaville	7 September 2015

The following new records were set during this competition.

Date	Event	Name	Nation	Time	Record
22 August	Final	Farida Osman	Egypt	25.94	GR

== Results ==
=== Heats ===
The heats were started on 22 August at 10:50.

Rank	Heat	Lane	Name	Nationality	Time	Notes
1	3	4	Farida Osman	Egypt	26.68	Q
2	3	5	Felicity Passon	Seychelles	27.23	Q
3	2	4	Erin Gallagher	South Africa	27.26	Q
4	1	4	Amel Melih	Algeria	27.59	Q
5	2	5	Emma Chelius	South Africa	27.84	Q
6	2	3	Farida Samra	Egypt	28.72	Q
7	2	2	Timipame-ere Akiayefa	Nigeria	28.74	Q
8	3	3	Emily Muteti	Kenya	28.82	Q
9	3	6	Imara-Bella Thorpe	Kenya	29.19	
10	1	2	Robyn Lee	Zimbabwe	29.37	
11	1	3	Rebecca Ssengonzi	Uganda	29.49	NR
12	1	5	Lia Lima	Angola	29.65	
13	1	6	Nomvulo Mjimba	Zimbabwe	29.91	
14	2	6	Sophia Diagne	Senegal	30.22	
15	3	2	Kiah Borg	Namibia	30.58	
16	3	7	Caitlin Loo	Botswana	31.48	
17	2	7	Khema Elizabeth	Seychelles	32.03	
18	1	7	Rahel Gebresilassie	Ethiopia	35.85	
19	3	1	Lina Selo	Ethiopia	37.84	
20	2	1	Aya Mpali	Gabon	39.64	

=== Final ===
The final was started on 22 August at 17:00.

Rank	Lane	Name	Nationality	Time	Notes
1st place, gold medalist(s)	4	Farida Osman	Egypt	25.94	GR
2nd place, silver medalist(s)	3	Erin Gallagher	South Africa	26.24	
3rd place, bronze medalist(s)	2	Emma Chelius	South Africa	27.40	
4	6	Amel Melih	Algeria	27.41	
5	5	Felicity Passon	Seychelles	27.43	
6	8	Imara-Bella Thorpe	Kenya	28.82	
7	7	Farida Samra	Egypt	28.83	
8	1	Timipame-ere Akiayefa	Nigeria	29.09	
