= Seychelles at the 2022 World Aquatics Championships =

- Flag of Seychelles
- FINA code: SEY
- National federation: Seychelles Swimming Association

in Budapest, Hungary
- Competitors: 6 in 2 sports
- Medals: Gold 0 Silver 0 Bronze 0 Total 0

World Aquatics Championships appearances
- 1973; 1975; 1978; 1982; 1986; 1991; 1994; 1998; 2001; 2003; 2005; 2007; 2009; 2011; 2013; 2015; 2017; 2019; 2022; 2023; 2024

Seychelles competed at the 2022 World Aquatics Championships in Budapest, Hungary from 18 June to 3 July.

== Open water swimming ==
Swimmers from Seychelles have achieved qualifying standards in the following events.

Athlete	Event	Time	Rank
Damien Payet	Men's 10 km	2:13:54.9	55
Alain Vidot	Men's 5 km	OTL	
Therese Soukup	Women's 5 km	1:12:01.6	51

== Swimming ==
Swimmers from Seychelles have achieved qualifying standards in the following events.

Athlete	Event	Heat		Semifinal		Final	
Athlete	Event	Time	Rank	Time	Rank	Time	Rank
Mathieu Bachmann	Men's 100 m freestyle	54.08	79	did not advance			
Mathieu Bachmann	Men's 100 m butterfly	56.85	52	did not advance			
Simon Bachmann	Men's 200 m butterfly	2:06.70	38	did not advance			
Simon Bachmann	Men's 200 m individual medley	2:09.75	38	did not advance			
Khema Elizabeth	Women's 50 m freestyle	28.18	56	did not advance			
Khema Elizabeth	Women's 100 m freestyle	1:02.79	48	did not advance			
Therese Soukup	Women's 200 m freestyle	2:16.23	36	did not advance			
Therese Soukup	Women's 400 m freestyle	4:46.09	32	—		did not advance	
Mathieu Bachmann; Simon Bachmann; Khema Elizabeth; Therese Soukup	4 × 100 m mixed freestyle relay	3:53.25	21	—		did not advance	
Mathieu Bachmann; Simon Bachmann; Khema Elizabeth; Therese Soukup	4 × 100 m mixed medley relay	4:19.21	24	—		did not advance	
