= Swimming at the 2019 African Games – Women's 200 metre freestyle =

Women's 200 metre freestyle at the 2019 African Games
- Venue: Mohammed V Sports Complex – Olympic Pool
- Dates: 22 August (heats and final)
- Competitors: 13 from 10 nations
- Winning time: 2:04.31

Medalists
| gold medal | Hania Moro | Egypt |
| silver medal | Christin Mundell | South Africa |
| bronze medal | Majda Chebaraka | Algeria |

The women's 200 metre freestyle competition of the 2019 African Games was held on 22 August 2019.

== Records ==
Prior to the competition, the existing world and championship records were as follows.

| | Name | Nation | Time | Location | Date |
|---|---|---|---|---|---|
| World record | Federica Pellegrini | Italy | 1:52.98 | Rome | 29 July 2009 |
| African record | Kirsty Coventry | Zimbabwe | 1:57.04 | Austin | 7 June 2008 |
| Games record | Karin Prinsloo | South Africa | 1:59.84 | Maputo | 6 September 2011 |

== Results ==
=== Heats ===
The heats were started on 22 August at 10:00.

| Rank | Heat | Lane | Name | Nationality | Time | Notes |
|---|---|---|---|---|---|---|
| 1 | 2 | 4 | Hania Moro | Egypt | 2:06.27 | Q |
| 2 | 1 | 5 | Jessica Whelan | South Africa | 2:07.07 | Q |
| 3 | 1 | 3 | Majda Chebaraka | Algeria | 2:07.38 | Q |
| 4 | 2 | 3 | Lina Khiyara | Morocco | 2:07.61 | Q |
| 5 | 2 | 5 | Christin Mundell | South Africa | 2:08.26 | Q |
| 6 | 1 | 4 | Yasmin Hassan | Egypt | 2:11.00 | Q |
| 7 | 1 | 6 | Robyn Lee | Zimbabwe | 2:11.34 | Q |
| 8 | 1 | 7 | Catarina Sousa | Angola | 2:11.88 | Q |
| 9 | 2 | 6 | Imara-Bella Thorpe | Kenya | 2:13.68 | |
| 10 | 2 | 2 | Abibat Ogunbanwo | Nigeria | 2:17.35 | |
| 11 | 1 | 2 | Inass Rachidi | Morocco | 2:20.12 | |
| 12 | 2 | 1 | Caitlin Loo | Botswana | 2:23.08 | |
| 13 | 2 | 7 | Khema Elizabeth | Seychelles | 2:24.72 | |

=== Final ===
The final was started on 22 August at 17:15.

| Rank | Lane | Name | Nationality | Time | Notes |
|---|---|---|---|---|---|
| 1st place, gold medalist(s) | 4 | Hania Moro | Egypt | 2:04.31 | |
| 2nd place, silver medalist(s) | 2 | Christin Mundell | South Africa | 2:04.75 | |
| 3rd place, bronze medalist(s) | 3 | Majda Chebaraka | Algeria | 2:05.51 | |
| 4 | 5 | Jessica Whelan | South Africa | 2:06.24 | |
| 5 | 6 | Lina Khiyara | Morocco | 2:06.78 | |
| 6 | 8 | Catarina Sousa | Angola | 2:09.55 | |
| 7 | 1 | Robyn Lee | Zimbabwe | 2:10.16 | |
| 8 | 7 | Yasmin Hassan | Egypt | 2:11.27 | |
