= Morocco at the 2017 World Aquatics Championships =

- Flag of Morocco
- World Aquatics code: MAR
- National federation: Royal Moroccan Swimming Federation
- Website: www.frmnatation.com

in Budapest, Hungary
- Competitors: 3 in 1 sport
- Medals: Gold 0 Silver 0 Bronze 0 Total 0

World Aquatics Championships appearances
- 1973; 1975; 1978; 1982; 1986; 1991; 1994; 1998; 2001; 2003; 2005; 2007; 2009; 2011; 2013; 2015; 2017; 2019; 2022; 2023; 2024; 2025

Morocco competed at the 2017 World Aquatics Championships in Budapest, Hungary from 14 to 30 July.

== Swimming ==
Morocco has received a Universality invitation from FINA to send three swimmers (two men and one woman) to the World Championships.

Athlete	Event	Heat		Semifinal		Final	
Athlete	Event	Time	Rank	Time	Rank	Time	Rank
Souhail Hamouchane	Men's 50 m freestyle	24.14	79	did not advance			
Souhail Hamouchane	Men's 100 m freestyle	53.52	77	did not advance			
Driss Lahrichi	Men's 50 m backstroke	26.60	42	did not advance			
Driss Lahrichi	Men's 100 m backstroke	57.46	36	did not advance			
Hiba Fahsi	Women's 50 m backstroke	30.75	48	did not advance			
Hiba Fahsi	Women's 100 m backstroke	1:06.08	46	did not advance			
