= Swimming at the 2019 African Games – Women's 100 metre butterfly =

Women's 100 metre butterfly at the 2019 African Games
- Venue: Mohammed V Sports Complex – Olympic Pool
- Dates: 23 August (heats and final)
- Competitors: 15 from 10 nations
- Winning time: 58.79

Medalists
gold medal	Farida Osman	Egypt
silver medal	Erin Gallagher	South Africa
bronze medal	Felicity Passon	Seychelles

The Women's 100 metre butterfly competition of the 2019 African Games was held on 23 August 2019.

== Records ==
Prior to the competition, the existing world and championship records were as follows.

	Name	Nation	Time	Location	Date
World record	Sarah Sjöström	Sweden	55.48	Rio de Janeiro	7 August 2016
African record	Erin Gallagher	South Africa	57.67	Durban	10 April 2019
Games record	Farida Osman	Egypt	58.83	Brazzaville	9 September 2015

The following new records were set during this competition.

Date	Event	Name	Nation	Time	Record
23 August	Final	Farida Osman	Egypt	58.79	GR

== Results ==
=== Heats ===
The heats were started on 23 August at 10:35.

Rank	Heat	Lane	Name	Nationality	Time	Notes
1	1	4	Farida Osman	Egypt	1:01.11	Q
2	2	4	Erin Gallagher	South Africa	1:01.13	Q
3	2	5	Felicity Passon	Seychelles	1:01.79	Q
4	2	3	Emily Muteti	Kenya	1:03.16	Q
5	1	5	Emma Chelius	South Africa	1:03.46	Q
6	1	3	Logaine Abdelatif	Egypt	1:04.23	Q
7	2	7	Imara-Bella Thorpe	Kenya	1:05.08	Q
8	2	6	Lia Lima	Angola	1:05.11	Q
9	1	6	Rebecca Ssengonzi	Uganda	1:05.16	NR
10	1	2	Lina Khiyara	Morocco	1:06.22	
11	2	2	Robyn Lee	Zimbabwe	1:06.71	
12	1	7	Nomvulo Mjimba	Zimbabwe	1:08.45	
13	2	1	Caitlin Loo	Botswana	1:11.04	
14	1	1	Rahel Gebresilassie	Ethiopia	1:24.23	
15	2	8	Berhane Amare	Ethiopia	1:26.68	

=== Final ===
The final was started on 23 August at 17:00.

Rank	Lane	Name	Nationality	Time	Notes
1st place, gold medalist(s)	4	Farida Osman	Egypt	58.79	GR
2nd place, silver medalist(s)	5	Erin Gallagher	South Africa	59.34	
3rd place, bronze medalist(s)	3	Felicity Passon	Seychelles	1:00.61	
4	2	Emma Chelius	South Africa	1:01.90	
5	6	Emily Muteti	Kenya	1:03.23	
6	7	Logaine Abdelatif	Egypt	1:03.72	
7	8	Lia Lima	Angola	1:04.16	
8	1	Imara-Bella Thorpe	Kenya	1:04.24	
