= Seychelles at the 2019 World Aquatics Championships =

- Flag of Seychelles
- FINA code: SEY
- National federation: Seychelles Swimming Association

in Gwangju, South Korea
- Competitors: 9 in 2 sports
- Medals: Gold 0 Silver 0 Bronze 0 Total 0

World Aquatics Championships appearances
- 1973; 1975; 1978; 1982; 1986; 1991; 1994; 1998; 2001; 2003; 2005; 2007; 2009; 2011; 2013; 2015; 2017; 2019; 2022; 2023; 2024

Seychelles competed at the 2019 World Aquatics Championships in Gwangju, South Korea from 12 to 28 July.

== Open water swimming ==
Seychelles qualified four male and one female open water swimmers.

Men

Athlete	Event	Time	Rank
Simon Bachmann	Men's 5 km	58:32.0	50
Dean Hoffman	Men's 5 km	1:05:33.5	60
Damien Payet	Men's 10 km	2:00:27.6	66
Alain Vidot	Men's 10 km	OTL	

Women

Athlete	Event	Time	Rank
Sofie Frichot	Women's 10 km	2:18:07.7	60

== Swimming ==
Seychelles entered four swimmers.

Men

Athlete	Event	Heat		Semifinal		Final	
Athlete	Event	Time	Rank	Time	Rank	Time	Rank
Simon Bachmann	100 m butterfly	58.06	64	did not advance			
Simon Bachmann	400 m individual medley	4:41.42	39	—		did not advance	
Samuele Rossi	50 m freestyle	24.90	91	did not advance			
Samuele Rossi	50 m backstroke	31.67	69	did not advance			

Women

Athlete	Event	Heat		Semifinal		Final	
Athlete	Event	Time	Rank	Time	Rank	Time	Rank
Aaliyah Palestrini	50 m breaststroke	40.90	49	did not advance			
Aaliyah Palestrini	50 m butterfly	30.18	46	did not advance			
Felicity Passon	50 m freestyle	26.35	41	did not advance			
Felicity Passon	200 m backstroke	2:14.60	30	did not advance			

Mixed

Athlete	Event	Heat		Final	
Athlete	Event	Time	Rank	Time	Rank
Felicity Passon; Simon Bachmann; Aaliyah Palestrini; Samuele Rossi	4 × 100 m mixed freestyle relay	3:47.98	26	did not advance	
