= Swimming at the 2019 African Games – Women's 50 metre backstroke =

Women's 50 metre backstroke at the 2019 African Games
- Venue: Mohammed V Sports Complex – Olympic Pool
- Dates: 23 August (heats and final)
- Competitors: 22 from 16 nations
- Winning time: 29.05

Medalists
gold medal	Erin Gallagher	South Africa
silver medal	Felicity Passon	Seychelles
bronze medal	Naomi Ruele	Botswana

The Women's 50 metre backstroke competition of the 2019 African Games was held on 23 August 2019.

== Records ==
Prior to the competition, the existing world and championship records were as follows.

	Name	Nation	Time	Location	Date
World record	Liu Xiang	China	26.98	Jakarta	21 August 2018
African record	Kirsty Coventry	Zimbabwe	28.08	Monte Carlo	13 June 2015
Games record	Kirsty Coventry	Zimbabwe	28.89	Algiers	16 July 2007

== Results ==
=== Heats ===
The heats were started on 23 August at 11:20.

Rank	Heat	Lane	Name	Nationality	Time	Notes
1	2	5	Felicity Passon	Seychelles	29.47	Q
2	2	4	Naomi Ruele	Botswana	29.62	Q
3	1	4	Amel Melih	Algeria	29.76	Q
4	1	5	Kerryn Herbst	South Africa	29.77	Q
5	3	4	Erin Gallagher	South Africa	29.94	Q
6	3	3	Rola Hussein	Egypt	30.37	Q
7	3	2	Sylvia Brunlehner	Kenya	30.70	Q
8	1	3	Sara El Tahawi	Algeria	30.88	Q
9	3	5	Robyn Lee	Zimbabwe	31.00	R
10	2	3	Hiba Fahsi	Morocco	31.25	R
11	3	6	Farida Samra	Egypt	31.26	
12	3	7	Timipame-ere Akiayefa	Nigeria	31.31	
13	2	7	Catarina Sousa	Angola	31.60	NR
14	1	6	Camille Koenig	Mauritius	31.63	
15	2	6	Yasmine Dgaimesh	Morocco	31.80	
16	2	2	Sophia Diagne	Senegal	32.33	
17	1	2	Imara-Bella Thorpe	Kenya	32.62	
18	2	1	Lombe Mwape	Zambia	36.29	
19	1	7	Khema Elizabeth	Seychelles	37.00	
20	3	8	Nafissath Radji	Benin	37.43	
21	3	1	Genet Demissia	Ethiopia	41.05	
22	1	1	Odrina Kaze	Burundi	46.15	

=== Final ===
The final was started on 23 August at 17:00.

Rank	Lane	Name	Nationality	Time	Notes
1st place, gold medalist(s)	2	Erin Gallagher	South Africa	29.05	
2nd place, silver medalist(s)	4	Felicity Passon	Seychelles	29.17	
3rd place, bronze medalist(s)	5	Naomi Ruele	Botswana	29.22	
4	6	Kerryn Herbst	South Africa	29.65	
5	7	Rola Hussein	Egypt	29.77	
6	3	Amel Melih	Algeria	29.93	
7	1	Sylvia Brunlehner	Kenya	30.53	
8	8	Sara El Tahawi	Algeria	31.37	
