= Morocco at the 2015 World Aquatics Championships =

- Flag of Morocco
- FINA code: MAR
- National federation: Royal Moroccan Swimming Federation
- Website: www.frmnatation.com

in Kazan, Russia
- Competitors: 3 in 1 sport
- Medals: Gold 0 Silver 0 Bronze 0 Total 0

World Aquatics Championships appearances
- 1973; 1975; 1978; 1982; 1986; 1991; 1994; 1998; 2001; 2003; 2005; 2007; 2009; 2011; 2013; 2015; 2017; 2019; 2022; 2023; 2024

Morocco competed at the 2015 World Aquatics Championships in Kazan, Russia from 24 July to 9 August 2015.

== Swimming ==
Moroccan swimmers have achieved qualifying standards in the following events (up to a maximum of 2 swimmers in each event at the A-standard entry time, and 1 at the B-standard):

Men

Athlete	Event	Heat		Semifinal		Final	
Athlete	Event	Time	Rank	Time	Rank	Time	Rank
Nouamane Batahi	100 m butterfly	57.11	56	did not advance			
Nouamane Batahi	200 m butterfly	2:07.54	38	did not advance			
Driss Lahrichi	100 m backstroke	1:00.42	58	did not advance			
Driss Lahrichi	200 m backstroke	2:09.14	36	did not advance			

Women

Athlete	Event	Heat		Semifinal		Final	
Athlete	Event	Time	Rank	Time	Rank	Time	Rank
Noura Mana	50 m freestyle	28.45	77	did not advance			
Noura Mana	100 m backstroke	1:10.79	60	did not advance			
