= Seychelles at the 2024 World Aquatics Championships =

- Flag of Seychelles
- FINA code: SEY
- National federation: Seychelles Swimming Association

in Doha, Qatar
- Competitors: 7 in 2 sports
- Medals: Gold 0 Silver 0 Bronze 0 Total 0

World Aquatics Championships appearances
- 1973; 1975; 1978; 1982; 1986; 1991; 1994; 1998; 2001; 2003; 2005; 2007; 2009; 2011; 2013; 2015; 2017; 2019; 2022; 2023; 2024

Seychelles competed at the 2024 World Aquatics Championships in Doha, Qatar from 2 to 18 February.

== Competitors ==
The following is the list of competitors in the Championships.

Sport	Men	Women	Total
Open water swimming	2	1	3
Swimming	2	2	4
Total	4	3	7

== Open water swimming ==
Men

Athlete	Event	Time	Rank
Thierry Payet	Men's 5 km	1:01:24.5	70
Damien Payet	Men's 5 km	57:39.7	62

Women

Athlete	Event	Time	Rank
Dorianne Bristol	Women's 5 km	OTL	

== Swimming ==
Seychelles entered 4 swimmers.

Men

Athlete	Event	Heat		Semifinal		Final	
Athlete	Event	Time	Rank	Time	Rank	Time	Rank
Simon Bachmann	200 metre butterfly	2:03.31	31	Did not advance			
Simon Bachmann	200 metre individual medley	2:07.85	34	Did not advance			
Adam Moncherry	50 metre freestyle	24.27	67	Did not advance			
Adam Moncherry	50 metre butterfly	25.40	43	Did not advance			

Women

Athlete	Event	Heat		Semifinal		Final	
Athlete	Event	Time	Rank	Time	Rank	Time	Rank
Aaliyah Palestrini	50 metre freestyle	28.69	72	Did not advance			
Aaliyah Palestrini	50 metre backstroke	32.07	45	Did not advance			
Angelina Smythe	100 metre freestyle	1:03.63	67	Did not advance			
Angelina Smythe	100 metre backstroke	1:10.37	52	Did not advance			
