= Morocco at the 2022 World Aquatics Championships =

- Flag of Morocco
- FINA code: MAR
- National federation: Royal Moroccan Swimming Federation

in Budapest, Hungary
- Competitors: 4 in 1 sport
- Medals: Gold 0 Silver 0 Bronze 0 Total 0

World Aquatics Championships appearances
- 1973; 1975; 1978; 1982; 1986; 1991; 1994; 1998; 2001; 2003; 2005; 2007; 2009; 2011; 2013; 2015; 2017; 2019; 2022; 2023; 2024

Morocco competed at the 2022 World Aquatics Championships in Budapest, Hungary from 18 June to 3 July.

== Swimming ==
Athlete	Event	Heat		Semifinal		Final	
Athlete	Event	Time	Rank	Time	Rank	Time	Rank
Samy Boutouil	Men's 100 m freestyle	50.38	49	did not advance			
Samy Boutouil	Men's 50 m breaststroke	28.22	27	did not advance			
Souhail Hamouchane	Men's 50 m freestyle	23.46	55	did not advance			
Souhail Hamouchane	Men's 50 m butterfly	26.11	57	did not advance			
Imane Houda El Barodi	Women's 50 m breaststroke	32.99	38	did not advance			
Imane Houda El Barodi	Women's 50 m butterfly	27.96	40	did not advance			
Lina Khiyara	Women's 50 m freestyle	27.83	51	did not advance			
Lina Khiyara	Women's 100 m freestyle	1:00.79	41	did not advance			
Samy Boutouil; Imane Houda El Barodi; Souhail Hamouchane; Lina Khiyara	4 × 100 m mixed freestyle relay	3:43.33	18	—		did not advance	
Samy Boutouil; Imane Houda El Barodi; Souhail Hamouchane; Lina Khiyara	4 × 100 m mixed medley relay	4:10.91	21	—		did not advance	
