= Morocco at the 2011 World Aquatics Championships =

- Flag of Morocco
- FINA code: MAR
- National federation: Royal Moroccan Swimming Federation
- Website: www.frmnatation.com

in Shanghai, China
- Competitors: 3 in 1 sports
- Medals: Gold 0 Silver 0 Bronze 0 Total 0

World Aquatics Championships appearances
- 1973; 1975; 1978; 1982; 1986; 1991; 1994; 1998; 2001; 2003; 2005; 2007; 2009; 2011; 2013; 2015; 2017; 2019; 2022; 2023; 2024

Morocco competed at the 2011 World Aquatics Championships in Shanghai, China between July 16 and 31, 2011.

== Swimming ==
Morocco qualified 3 swimmers.

Men

Athlete	Event	Heats		Semifinals		Final	
Athlete	Event	Time	Rank	Time	Rank	Time	Rank
Amine Kouame	Men's 50m Freestyle	23.83	44	did not advance			
Amine Kouame	Men's 100m Freestyle	52.05	54	did not advance			
Morad Berrada	Men's 200m IM	2:06.90	35	did not advance			
Morad Berrada	Men's 400m IM	4:31.97	29			did not advance	

Women

Athlete	Event	Heats		Semifinals		Final	
Athlete	Event	Time	Rank	Time	Rank	Time	Rank
Sara El Bekri	Women's 100m Breaststroke	1:08.96	17	did not advance			
Sara El Bekri	Women's 200m Breaststroke	2:27.48	13 Q	2:26.74	15	did not advance	
