= Seychelles at the 2023 World Aquatics Championships =

- Flag of Seychelles
- FINA code: SEY
- National federation: Seychelles Swimming Association

in Fukuoka, Japan
- Competitors: 4 in 2 sports
- Medals: Gold 0 Silver 0 Bronze 0 Total 0

World Aquatics Championships appearances
- 1973; 1975; 1978; 1982; 1986; 1991; 1994; 1998; 2001; 2003; 2005; 2007; 2009; 2011; 2013; 2015; 2017; 2019; 2022; 2023; 2024

Seychelles is set to compete at the 2023 World Aquatics Championships in Fukuoka, Japan from 14 to 30 July.

== Open water swimming ==
Seychelles entered 2 open water swimmers.

Men

Athlete	Event	Time	Rank
Damien Payet	Men's 5 km	1:01:56.4	57
Damien Payet	Men's 10 km	2:11:03.3	61

Women

Athlete	Event	Time	Rank
Sofie Frichot	Women's 5 km	1:13:46.0	55
Sofie Frichot	Women's 10 km	OTL	

== Swimming ==
Seychelles entered 2 swimmers.

Men

Athlete	Event	Heat		Semifinal		Final	
Athlete	Event	Time	Rank	Time	Rank	Time	Rank
Simon Bachmann	200 metre butterfly	2:03.57	31	Did not advance			
Simon Bachmann	200 metre individual medley	2:08.50	41	Did not advance			

Women

Athlete	Event	Heat		Semifinal		Final	
Athlete	Event	Time	Rank	Time	Rank	Time	Rank
Felicity Passon	100 metre backstroke	1:05.35	50	Did not advance			
Felicity Passon	100 metre butterfly	1:03.15	41	Did not advance			
