= 2018 African Swimming Championships – Women's 100 metre freestyle =

Women's 100 metre freestyle at the 2018 African Swimming Championships
- Venue: Mohamed Boudiaf Olympic Complex
- Dates: 10 September (heats and final)
- Competitors: 24 from 16 nations
- Winning time: 54.79

Medalists
gold medal	Erin Gallagher	South Africa
silver medal	Farida Osman	Egypt
bronze medal	Nesrine Medjahed	Algeria

The Women's 100 metre freestyle competition of the 2018 African Swimming Championships was held on 10 September 2018.

== Records ==
Prior to the competition, the existing world and championship records were as follows.

	Name	Nation	Time	Location	Date
World record	Sarah Sjöström	Sweden	51.71	Budapest	23 July 2017
African record	Erin Gallagher	South Africa	54.23	Gold Coast	9 April 2018
Championship record	Karin Prinsloo	South Africa	56.40	Casablanca	13 September 2010

The following new records were set during this competition.

Date	Event	Name	Nationality	Time	Record
10 September	Final	Erin Gallagher	South Africa	54.79	CR

== Results ==
=== Heats ===
The heats were started on 10 September at 11:30.

Rank	Name	Nationality	Time	Notes
1	Erin Gallagher	South Africa	58.08	Q
2	Farida Osman	Egypt	58.16	Q
3	Farah Benkhelil	Tunisia	59.03	Q
4	Nesrine Medjahed	Algeria	59.47	Q
5	Jeanne Boutbien	Senegal	1:00.05	Q
6	Majda Chebaraka	Algeria	1:00.52	Q
7	Catarina Sousa	Angola	1:00.57	Q
8	Lesley Blignaut	South Africa	1:00.62	Q
9	Noura Mana	Morocco	1:00.72	
10	Menna Kchouk	Tunisia	1:00.80	
11	Yasmeen Boutouil	Morocco	1:01.36	
12	Imara-Bella Thorpe	Kenya	1:01.58	
13	Tessa Ip Hen Cheung	Mauritius	1:01.61	
14	Therese Soukup	Seychelles	1:03.21	
15	Fatima Jayla	Cape Verde	1:03.55	
16	Lia Lima	Angola	1:04.75	
17	Selina Katumba	Uganda	1:04.91	
18	Samantha Rakotovelo	Madagascar	1:05.44	
19	Denise Mabasso	Mozambique	1:07.73	
20	Domingas Munhemeze	Mozambique	1:08.21	
21	Nafissath Radji	Benin	1:15.72	
	Antsa Rabesahala	Madagascar	Did not start	
	Chinoye Okolugbo	Nigeria	Did not start	
	Nkem Chukwuemeke	Nigeria	Did not start	

=== Final ===
The final was started on 10 September.

Rank	Lane	Name	Nationality	Time	Notes
1st place, gold medalist(s)	4	Erin Gallagher	South Africa	54.79	CR
2nd place, silver medalist(s)	5	Farida Osman	Egypt	56.80	
3rd place, bronze medalist(s)	6	Nesrine Medjahed	Algeria	58.09	
4	3	Farah Benkhelil	Tunisia	58.86	
5	8	Lesley Blignaut	South Africa	59.65	
6	2	Jeanne Boutbien	Senegal	1:00.01	
7	7	Majda Chebaraka	Algeria	1:00.29	
8	1	Catarina Sousa	Angola	1:00.84	
