= Morocco at the 2019 World Aquatics Championships =

- Flag of Morocco
- FINA code: MAR
- National federation: Royal Moroccan Swimming Federation
- Website: frmnatation.com (in French)

in Gwangju, South Korea
- Medals: Gold 0 Silver 0 Bronze 0 Total 0

World Aquatics Championships appearances
- 1973; 1975; 1978; 1982; 1986; 1991; 1994; 1998; 2001; 2003; 2005; 2007; 2009; 2011; 2013; 2015; 2017; 2019; 2022; 2023; 2024

Morocco competed at the 2019 World Aquatics Championships in Gwangju, South Korea from 12 to 28 July.

== Open water swimming ==
Morocco qualified one male open water swimmer.

Athlete	Event	Time	Rank
Mathieu Ben Rahou	Men's 5 km	53:59.9	39
Mathieu Ben Rahou	Men's 10 km	1:56:07.9	58

== Swimming ==
Moroccan swimmers have achieved qualifying standards in the following events (up to a maximum of 2 swimmers in each event at the A-standard entry time, and 1 at the B-standard)

Men

Athlete	Event	Heat		Semifinal		Final	
Athlete	Event	Time	Rank	Time	Rank	Time	Rank
Driss Lahrichi	50 m backstroke						
Driss Lahrichi	100 m backstroke						
Yusuf Tibazi	50 m butterfly						
Yusuf Tibazi	100 m butterfly						

Women

Athlete	Event	Heat		Semifinal		Final	
Athlete	Event	Time	Rank	Time	Rank	Time	Rank
Lina Khiyara	50 m freestyle	28.17	63	did not advance			
Lina Khiyara	100 m freestyle	59.93	62	did not advance			
