= 2018 African Swimming Championships – Women's 200 metre freestyle =

Women's 200 metre freestyle at the 2018 African Swimming Championships
- Venue: Mohamed Boudiaf Olympic Complex
- Dates: 11 September (heats and final)
- Competitors: 12 from 9 nations
- Winning time: 2:04.46

Medalists
gold medal	Hania Moro	Egypt
silver medal	Jessica Whelan	South Africa
bronze medal	Janie Coetzer	South Africa

The Women's 200 metre freestyle competition of the 2018 African Swimming Championships was held on 11 September 2018.

== Records ==
Prior to the competition, the existing world and championship records were as follows.

	Name	Nation	Time	Location	Date
World record	Federica Pellegrini	Italy	1:52.98	Rome	29 July 2009
African record	Kirsty Coventry	Zimbabwe	1:57.04	Austin	7 June 2008
Championship record	Leone Vorster	South Africa	2:01.92	Dakar	12 September 2006

== Results ==
=== Heats ===
The heats were started on 11 September at 11:30.

Rank	Name	Nationality	Time	Notes
1	Hania Moro	Egypt	2:06.37	Q
2	Jessica Whelan	South Africa	2:08.48	Q
3	Janie Coetzer	South Africa	2:09.18	Q
4	Souad Cherouati	Algeria	2:10.13	Q
5	Majda Chebaraka	Algeria	2:11.58	Q
6	Menna Kchouk	Tunisia	2:11.85	Q
7	Imara-Bella Thorpe	Kenya	2:16.61	Q
8	Therese Soukup	Seychelles	2:16.99	Q
9	Selina Katumba	Uganda	2:25.90	NR
10	Catarina Trigo	Cape Verde	2:27.77	
11	Samantha Rakotovelo	Madagascar	2:28.07	
	Antsa Rabesahala	Madagascar	Did not start	

=== Final ===
The final was started on 11 September.

Rank	Lane	Name	Nationality	Time	Notes
1st place, gold medalist(s)	4	Hania Moro	Egypt	2:04.46	
2nd place, silver medalist(s)	5	Jessica Whelan	South Africa	2:06.14	
3rd place, bronze medalist(s)	3	Janie Coetzer	South Africa	2:07.08	
4	2	Majda Chebaraka	Algeria	2:07.10	
5	6	Souad Cherouati	Algeria	2:07.38	
6	7	Menna Kchouk	Tunisia	2:10.46	
7	1	Imara-Bella Thorpe	Kenya	2:14.52	
8	8	Therese Soukup	Seychelles	2:16.87	
