= Seychelles at the 2013 World Aquatics Championships =

- Flag of Seychelles
- FINA code: SEY
- National federation: Seychelles Swimming Association

in Barcelona, Spain
- Competitors: 3 in 1 sport
- Medals: Gold 0 Silver 0 Bronze 0 Total 0

World Aquatics Championships appearances
- 1973; 1975; 1978; 1982; 1986; 1991; 1994; 1998; 2001; 2003; 2005; 2007; 2009; 2011; 2013; 2015; 2017; 2019; 2022; 2023; 2024

Seychelles competed at the 2013 World Aquatics Championships in Barcelona, Spain between 19 July and 4 August 2013.

== Swimming ==
Seychellois swimmers achieved qualifying standards in the following events (up to a maximum of 2 swimmers in each event at the A-standard entry time, and 1 at the B-standard):

Men

| Athlete | Event | Heat | | Semifinal | | Final | |
| Athlete | Event | Time | Rank | Time | Rank | Time | Rank |
|---|---|---|---|---|---|---|---|
| Pierre-Andre Adam | 50 m breaststroke | 31.31 | 64 | did not advance | | | |
| Pierre-Andre Adam | 100 m breaststroke | 1:09.77 | 67 | did not advance | | | |
| Adam Viktoria | 50 m butterfly | 27.09 | 66 | did not advance | | | |
| Adam Viktoria | 200 m freestyle | 2:04.44 | 64 | did not advance | | | |

Women

| Athlete | Event | Heat | | Semifinal | | Final | |
| Athlete | Event | Time | Rank | Time | Rank | Time | Rank |
|---|---|---|---|---|---|---|---|
| Felicity Passon | 50 m freestyle | 28.62 | 59 | did not advance | | | |
| Felicity Passon | 50 m butterfly | 30.46 | 49 | did not advance | | | |
