= 2018 African Swimming Championships – Women's 50 metre backstroke =

Women's 50 metre backstroke at the 2018 African Swimming Championships
- Venue: Mohamed Boudiaf Olympic Complex
- Dates: 10 September (heats and final)
- Competitors: 20 from 14 nations
- Winning time: 29.04

Medalists
gold medal	Erin Gallagher	South Africa
silver medal	Samiha Mohsen	Egypt
bronze medal	Amel Melih	Algeria

The Women's 50 metre backstroke competition of the 2018 African Swimming Championships was held on 10 September 2018.

== Records ==
Prior to the competition, the existing world and championship records were as follows.

	Name	Nation	Time	Location	Date
World record	Liu Xiang	China	26.98	Jakarta	21 August 2018
African record	Kirsty Coventry	Zimbabwe	28.08	Monte Carlo	13 June 2015
Championship record	Chanelle Van Wyk	South Africa	29.31	Casablanca	13 September 2010

The following new records were set during this competition.

Date	Event	Name	Nationality	Time	Record
10 September	Final	Erin Gallagher	South Africa	29.04	CR

== Results ==
=== Heats ===
The heats were started on 10 September at 11:30.

Rank	Name	Nationality	Time	Notes
1	Amel Melih	Algeria	29.91	Q
2	Samiha Mohsen	Egypt	29.96	Q
3	Hannah Kiely	South Africa	30.63	Q
4	Hiba Fahsi	Morocco	30.76	Q
5	Erin Gallagher	South Africa	30.83	Q
6	Farah Benkhelil	Tunisia	30.90	Q
7	Camille Koenig	Mauritius	31.52	Q
8	Imara-Bella Thorpe	Kenya	32.20	Q
9	Catarina Sousa	Angola	32.30	
10	Imene Kawthar Zitouni	Algeria	32.36	
11	Yasmeen Boutouil	Morocco	32.43	
12	Jeanne Boutbien	Senegal	33.31	
13	Ada Thioune	Senegal	33.33	
14	Therese Soukup	Seychelles	33.70	
15	Jannat Bique	Mozambique	33.71	
16	Avice Meya	Uganda	35.44	NR
17	Selina Katumba	Uganda	36.41	
18	Nafissath Radji	Benin	38.92	
	Chinoye Okolugbo	Nigeria	Did not start	
	Mappy Kegbe	Nigeria	Did not start	

=== Final ===
The final was started on 10 September.

Rank	Lane	Name	Nationality	Time	Notes
1st place, gold medalist(s)	2	Erin Gallagher	South Africa	29.04	CR
2nd place, silver medalist(s)	5	Samiha Mohsen	Egypt	29.51	NR
3rd place, bronze medalist(s)	4	Amel Melih	Algeria	29.67	
4	3	Hannah Kiely	South Africa	30.32	
5	7	Farah Benkhelil	Tunisia	30.54	
6	6	Hiba Fahsi	Morocco	30.56	
7	1	Camille Koenig	Mauritius	31.51	
8	8	Imara-Bella Thorpe	Kenya	31.94	
