= Swimming at the 2019 African Games – Women's 200 metre backstroke =

Women's 200 metre backstroke at the 2019 African Games
- Venue: Mohammed V Sports Complex – Olympic Pool
- Dates: 21 August (final)
- Competitors: 8 from 7 nations
- Winning time: 2:14.55

Medalists
gold medal	Felicity Passon	Seychelles
silver medal	Samantha Randle	South Africa
bronze medal	Robyn Lee	Zimbabwe

The Women's 200 metre backstroke competition of the 2019 African Games was held on 21 August 2019.

== Records ==
Prior to the competition, the existing world and championship records were as follows.

	Name	Nation	Time	Location	Date
World record	Regan Smith	United States	2:03.35	Gwangju	26 July 2019
African record	Kirsty Coventry	Zimbabwe	2:04.81	Rome	1 August 2009
Games record	Kirsty Coventry	Zimbabwe	2:10.66	Algiers	17 July 2007

== Results ==
=== Final ===
The final was started on 21 August at 17:00.

Rank	Lane	Name	Nationality	Time	Notes
1st place, gold medalist(s)	4	Felicity Passon	Seychelles	2:14.55	NR
2nd place, silver medalist(s)	3	Samantha Randle	South Africa	2:15.50	
3rd place, bronze medalist(s)	5	Robyn Lee	Zimbabwe	2:22.50	
4	2	Logaine Abdelatif	Egypt	2:22.64	
5	7	Sara El Tahawi	Algeria	2:24.43	
6	6	Camille Koenig	Mauritius	2:26.80	
7	1	Lewethu Mbatha	South Africa	2:32.15	
	7	Yasmine Dgaimesh	Morocco	Disqualified	
