= Seychelles at the 2015 World Aquatics Championships =

- Flag of Seychelles
- FINA code: SEY
- National federation: Seychelles Swimming Association

in Kazan, Russia
- Competitors: 4 in 1 sport
- Medals: Gold 0 Silver 0 Bronze 0 Total 0

World Aquatics Championships appearances
- 1973; 1975; 1978; 1982; 1986; 1991; 1994; 1998; 2001; 2003; 2005; 2007; 2009; 2011; 2013; 2015; 2017; 2019; 2022; 2023; 2024

Seychelles competed at the 2015 World Aquatics Championships in Kazan, Russia from 24 July to 9 August 2015.

== Swimming ==
Seychellois swimmers have achieved qualifying standards in the following events (up to a maximum of 2 swimmers in each event at the A-standard entry time, and 1 at the B-standard):

Men

Athlete	Event	Heat		Semifinal		Final	
Athlete	Event	Time	Rank	Time	Rank	Time	Rank
Daniel Gill	100 m breaststroke	1:14.02	73	did not advance			
Adam Viktoria	50 m butterfly	27.08	58	did not advance			

Women

Athlete	Event	Heat		Semifinal		Final	
Athlete	Event	Time	Rank	Time	Rank	Time	Rank
Alexus Laird	200 m individual medley	2:27.68	37	did not advance			
Felicity Passon	100 m butterfly	1:03.29	47	did not advance			
