= Morocco at the 2023 World Aquatics Championships =

- Flag of Morocco
- FINA code: MAR
- National federation: Royal Moroccan Swimming Federation
- Website: frmnatation.com

in Fukuoka, Japan
- Competitors: 3 in 3 sports
- Medals: Gold 0 Silver 0 Bronze 0 Total 0

World Aquatics Championships appearances
- 1973; 1975; 1978; 1982; 1986; 1991; 1994; 1998; 2001; 2003; 2005; 2007; 2009; 2011; 2013; 2015; 2017; 2019; 2022; 2023; 2024

Morocco is set to compete at the 2023 World Aquatics Championships in Fukuoka, Japan from 14 to 30 July.

== Artistic swimming ==
Morocco entered 1 artistic swimmer.

Women

Athlete	Event	Preliminaries		Final	
Athlete	Event	Points	Rank	Points	Rank
Jennah Hafsi	Solo technical routine	175.6200	15	did not advance	
Jennah Hafsi	Solo free routine	114.3521	25	did not advance	

== Open water swimming ==
Morocco entered 1 open water swimmer.

Women

Athlete	Event	Time	Rank
Malak Meqdar	Women's 5 km	1:07:16.2	51

== Swimming ==
Morocco entered 2 swimmers.

Women

Athlete	Event	Heat		Semifinal		Final	
Athlete	Event	Time	Rank	Time	Rank	Time	Rank
Imane El Barodi	50 metre breaststroke	32.64	38	Did not advance			
Imane El Barodi	100 metre breaststroke	1:13.83	47	Did not advance			
Malak Meqdar	1500 metre freestyle	17:46.69	31	—		Did not advance	
Malak Meqdar	200 metre breaststroke	2:43.42	32	Did not advance			
