= Morocco at the 2024 World Aquatics Championships =

- Flag of Morocco
- FINA code: MAR
- National federation: Royal Moroccan Swimming Federation
- Website: frmnatation.com

in Doha, Qatar
- Competitors: 5 in 3 sports
- Medals: Gold 0 Silver 0 Bronze 0 Total 0

World Aquatics Championships appearances
- 1973; 1975; 1978; 1982; 1986; 1991; 1994; 1998; 2001; 2003; 2005; 2007; 2009; 2011; 2013; 2015; 2017; 2019; 2022; 2023; 2024

Morocco competed at the 2024 World Aquatics Championships in Doha, Qatar from 2 to 18 February.

== Competitors ==
The following is the list of competitors in the Championships.

Sport	Men	Women	Total
Artistic swimming	0	1	1
Open water swimming	1*	1*	2*
Swimming	2*	2*	4*
Total	2*	3*	5*

Ilias El Fallaki and Malak Meqdar competed in both open water swimming and pool swimming.

== Artistic swimming ==
Women

Athlete	Event	Preliminaries		Final	
Athlete	Event	Points	Rank	Points	Rank
Jennah Hafsi	Solo technical routine	155.9850	26	Did not advance	
Jennah Hafsi	Solo free routine	162.7730	21	Did not advance	
Jennah Hafsi; Noah Kroon	Duet technical routine	Did not start		Did not advance	
Jennah Hafsi; Noah Kroon	Duet free routine	Did not start		Did not advance	

== Open water swimming ==
Men

Athlete	Event	Time	Rank
Ilias El Fallaki	Men's 5 km	57:03.2	55
Ilias El Fallaki	Men's 10 km	2:07:31.0	71

Women

Athlete	Event	Time	Rank
Malak Meqdar	Women's 5 km	1:04:55.8	48

== Swimming ==
Morocco entered 4 swimmers.

Men

Athlete	Event	Heat		Semifinal		Final	
Athlete	Event	Time	Rank	Time	Rank	Time	Rank
Ryan Barbe	200 metre freestyle	1:58.07	60	Did not advance			
Ryan Barbe	400 metre freestyle	4:16.08	53	—		Did not advance	
Ilias El Fallaki	800 metre freestyle	8:27.22	38	—		Did not advance	
Ilias El Fallaki	1500 metre freestyle	16:19.73	31	—		Did not advance	

Women

Athlete	Event	Heat		Semifinal		Final	
Athlete	Event	Time	Rank	Time	Rank	Time	Rank
Imane El Barodi	50 metre freestyle	27.70	63	Did not advance			
Imane El Barodi	100 metre breaststroke	1:14.55	42	Did not advance			
Malak Meqdar	400 metre freestyle	4:36.32	30	—		Did not advance	
Malak Meqdar	1500 metre freestyle	18:06.86	23	—		Did not advance	
