= Seychelles at the 2017 World Aquatics Championships =

- Flag of Seychelles
- FINA code: SEY
- National federation: Seychelles Swimming Association

in Budapest, Hungary
- Competitors: 4 in 1 sport
- Medals: Gold 0 Silver 0 Bronze 0 Total 0

World Aquatics Championships appearances
- 1973; 1975; 1978; 1982; 1986; 1991; 1994; 1998; 2001; 2003; 2005; 2007; 2009; 2011; 2013; 2015; 2017; 2019; 2022; 2023; 2024

Seychelles competed at the 2017 World Aquatics Championships in Budapest, Hungary, from 14 July to 30 July.

== Swimming ==
Seychelles has received a Universality invitation from FINA to send a maximum of four swimmers (two men and two women) to the World Championships.

Athlete	Event	Heat		Semifinal		Final	
Athlete	Event	Time	Rank	Time	Rank	Time	Rank
Dean Hoffman	Men's 100 m freestyle	55.15	86	did not advance			
Dean Hoffman	Men's 200 m freestyle	2:02.62	70	did not advance			
Adam Moncherry	Men's 50 m freestyle	25.27	98	did not advance			
Adam Moncherry	Men's 50 m butterfly	27.23	68	did not advance			
Alexus Laird	Women's 50 m freestyle	27.65	54	did not advance			
Alexus Laird	Women's 100 m backstroke	1:07.67	49	did not advance			
Felicity Passon	Women's 100 m freestyle	57.99	42	did not advance			
Felicity Passon	Women's 50 m backstroke	30.32	43	did not advance			
Dean Hoffman; Adam Moncherry; Alexus Laird; Felicity Passon	Mixed 4×100 m freestyle relay	3:52.27	18	—		did not advance	
Dean Hoffman; Adam Moncherry; Alexus Laird; Felicity Passon	Mixed 4×100 m medley relay	DNS		—		did not advance	
