= 2018 African Swimming Championships – Women's 50 metre butterfly =

Women's 500 metre butterfly at the 2018 African Swimming Championships
- Venue: Mohamed Boudiaf Olympic Complex
- Dates: 11 September (heats and final)
- Competitors: 16 from 12 nations
- Winning time: 26.16

Medalists
gold medal	Farida Osman	Egypt
silver medal	Erin Gallagher	South Africa
bronze medal	Amel Melih	Algeria

The Women's 50 metre butterfly competition of the 2018 African Swimming Championships was held on 11 September 2018.

== Records ==
Prior to the competition, the existing world and championship records were as follows.

	Name	Nation	Time	Location	Date
World record	Sarah Sjöström	Sweden	24.43	Borås	5 July 2014
African record	Farida Osman	Egypt	25.39	Budapest	29 July 2017
Championship record	Farida Osman	Egypt	27.28	Casablanca	14 September 2010

The following new records were set during this competition.

Date	Event	Name	Nation	Time	Record
11 August	Heat	Erin Gallagher	South Africa	27.26	CR
11 August	Heat	Farida Osman	Egypt	26.74	CR
11 August	Final	Farida Osman	Egypt	26.16	CR

== Results ==
=== Heats ===
The heats were started on 11 September at 11:40.

Rank	Name	Nationality	Time	Notes
1	Farida Osman	Egypt	26.74	Q CR
2	Erin Gallagher	South Africa	27.26	Q
3	Amel Melih	Algeria	28.03	Q
4	Samiha Mohsen	Egypt	28.34	Q
5	Imane El Barodi	Morocco	28.69	Q
6	Nesrine Medjahed	Algeria	29.11	Q
7	Khwezi Duma	South Africa	29.40	Q
8	Lia Lima	Angola	29.69	Q
9	Camille Koenig	Mauritius	30.03	
10	Imara-Bella Thorpe	Kenya	30.04	
11	Avice Meya	Uganda	31.20	
12	Ndeye Tabara Diagne	Senegal	31.29	
13	Jannat Bique	Mozambique	31.34	
14	Domingas Munhemeze	Mozambique	32.16	
15	Samantha Rakotovelo	Madagascar	32.40	
	Mappy Kegbe	Nigeria	Did not start	

=== Final ===
The final was started on 11 September.

Rank	Lane	Name	Nationality	Time	Notes
1st place, gold medalist(s)	4	Farida Osman	Egypt	26.16	CR
2nd place, silver medalist(s)	5	Erin Gallagher	South Africa	26.64	
3rd place, bronze medalist(s)	3	Amel Melih	Algeria	27.52	
4	6	Samiha Mohsen	Egypt	28.19	
5	7	Nesrine Medjahed	Algeria	28.49	
6	2	Imane El Barodi	Morocco	29.38	
7	1	Khwezi Duma	South Africa	29.82	
8	8	Lia Lima	Angola	30.01	
