= Selina Katumba =

Ugandan swimmer

Personal information
- Full name: Selina Ssubi Katumba
- Nationality: Ugandan
- Born: 27 June 2003 (age 23)

Sport
- Sport: Swimming
- Club: SilverFin Academy

Selina Ssubi Katumba (born 27 June 2003) is a Ugandan swimmer. She competed in the women's 100 metre freestyle at the 2019 World Aquatics Championships.

== Major results ==
=== Individual ===
==== Long course ====
Year	Competition	Venue	Position	Event	Notes
Representing Uganda
2018	African Championships	Algiers, Algeria	15th (h)	50 m freestyle	29.16
2018	African Championships	Algiers, Algeria	17th (h)	100 m freestyle	1:04.91
2018	African Championships	Algiers, Algeria	9th (h)	200 m freestyle	2:25.90
2018	African Championships	Algiers, Algeria	17th (h)	50 m backstroke	36.41
2019	World Championships	Gwangju, South Korea	76th (h)	100 m freestyle	1:03.88
2019	World Championships	Gwangju, South Korea	57th (h)	50 m butterfly	32.77

==== Short course ====
Year	Competition	Venue	Position	Event	Notes
Representing Uganda
2018	World Championships	Hangzhou, China	61st (h)	50 m freestyle	28.42
2018	World Championships	Hangzhou, China	72nd (h)	100 m freestyle	1:03.36

=== Relay ===
==== Long course ====
Year	Competition	Venue	Team	Position	Event	Notes
Representing Uganda
2018	African Championships	Algiers, Algeria	Adnan Kabuye, Avice Meya, Atuhaire Ambala	11th (h)	4 × 100 m mixed freestyle	4:09.61
2018	African Championships	Algiers, Algeria	Adnan Kabuye, Atuhaire Ambala, Avice Meya	10th (h)	4 × 100 m mixed medley	4:45.93
2019	World Championships	Gwangju, South Korea	Atuhaire Ambala, Tendo Mukalazi, Avice Meya	31st (h)	4 × 100 m mixed freestyle	4:00.09

== See also ==
- List of Ugandan records in swimming
