= Seychelles at the 2011 World Aquatics Championships =

- Flag of Seychelles
- FINA code: SEY
- National federation: Seychelles Swimming Association

in Shanghai, China
- Competitors: 3 in 1 sport
- Medals: Gold 0 Silver 0 Bronze 0 Total 0

World Aquatics Championships appearances
- 1973; 1975; 1978; 1982; 1986; 1991; 1994; 1998; 2001; 2003; 2005; 2007; 2009; 2011; 2013; 2015; 2017; 2019; 2022; 2023; 2024

Seychelles competed at the 2011 World Aquatics Championships in Shanghai, China between July 16 and 31, 2011.

== Swimming ==
Seychelles qualified 3 swimmers.

Men

Athlete	Event	Heats		Semifinals		Final	
Athlete	Event	Time	Rank	Time	Rank	Time	Rank
Shane Mangroo	Men's 50m Freestyle	26.32	77	did not advance			
Shane Mangroo	Men's 100m Freestyle	57.85	84	did not advance			
Ryan Govinden	Men's 200m Freestyle	2:18.07	60	did not advance			
Ryan Govinden	Men's 400m Freestyle	4:55.10	48			did not advance	

Women

Athlete	Event	Heats		Semifinals		Final	
Athlete	Event	Time	Rank	Time	Rank	Time	Rank
Aurelie Fanchette	Women's 200m Freestyle	2:31.88	48	did not advance			
Aurelie Fanchette	Women's 200m Backstroke	2:52.04	39	did not advance			
