= Emma Chelius =

South African swimmer (born 1996)

Personal information
- Born: 2 August 1996 (age 29) Westville, KwaZulu-Natal, South Africa

Sport
- Sport: Swimming
Medal record
Women's swimming
Representing South Africa
African Games
Gold medal – first place	2019 Rabat	4×100 m freestyle
Gold medal – first place	2019 Rabat	4×100 m medley
Gold medal – first place	2019 Rabat	4×100 m mixed freestyle
Gold medal – first place	2019 Rabat	4×100 m mixed medley
Bronze medal – third place	2019 Rabat	50 m freestyle
Bronze medal – third place	2019 Rabat	100 m freestyle
Bronze medal – third place	2019 Rabat	50 m butterfly

Emma Chelius (born 2 August 1996) is a South African swimmer.

== Biography ==
She competed in the women's 50 metre freestyle event at the 2017 World Aquatics Championships. A month later, she competed at the Summer Universiade held in Taipei and qualified for the semi-final of the Women's 50m freestyle, where she finished 14th overall. Finishing 33rd in the 100m freestyle and 24th in the 50m butterfly, Chelius returned to Stellenbosch to finish her final year of studies.

In 2018, Chelius competed at the Commonwealth Games held in Gold Coast, Australia. Chelius qualified for the semi-finals in 3 events, the 50m freestyle, 100m freestyle and the 50m butterfly. In the 50m freestyle semi-final, Emma swam an identical time to the Cyprus swimmer for 10th place. This resulted in a swim-off for the second reserve, which Emma won in 25.5, a time that would have initially qualified for the final. In 2019, she represented South Africa at the 2019 African Games held in Rabat, Morocco. In April 2021, she qualified to represent South Africa at the 2020 Summer Olympics. in the Women's 50m freestyle. Swimming a qualifying time of 24.72 in the morning heats, Emma set a new South African record time and finished 1st in the finals later that day.

At the 2022 South Africa National Swimming Championships, Chelius qualified for the 2022 World Aquatics Championships in the 50 metre freestyle and 100 metre freestyle. She was named to the 2022 Commonwealth Games team the following month. She placed 22nd in the 100 metre freestyle at the World Championships with a time of 55.39 seconds. For the prelims session on the day of the 100 metre freestyle, she was the only pool swimmer to compete in any event representing South Africa. In the preliminaries of the 50 metre freestyle, she achieved a time of 24.87 seconds, swimming within a quarter of a second of the South African record in the event, and qualifying for the semifinals ranking seventh. Swimming a 24.87 in the semifinals as well, she placed ninth in the event, ranking just one-hundredth of a second behind the eighth qualifier for the final Julie Kepp Jensen of Denmark.

In the 4×100 metre mixed freestyle relay, on day one of swimming at the 2022 Commonwealth Games in Birmingham, England, Chelius and her prelims relay teammates were disqualified and did not advance to the final of the event. For the 50 metre freestyle preliminaries the following morning, she ranked fifth overall and qualified for the evening semifinals. She ranked fifth in the semifinals after finishing third in semifinal heat two and qualified for the final. In the final of the 4×100 metre freestyle relay, she split a 55.14 for the second leg of the relay to help place fourth in 3:40.31. The following day, she placed fourth in the final of the 50 metre freestyle with a time of 24.78 seconds. On day four, she ranked ninth in the preliminaries of the 100 metre freestyle and qualified for the semifinals with her time of 55.63 seconds. She continued to place eleventh with a time of 55.80 seconds in the semifinals. Splitting a 54.79 for the freestyle leg of the 4×100 metre mixed medley relay the following day in the preliminaries, she helped qualify the relay to the final ranking fourth with a time of 3:51.56. For the finals relay, Aimee Canny substituted in for her and the relay placed fourth.
