= Erin Gallagher =

South African swimmer (born 1998)

Personal information
- Nationality: South African
- Born: 18 December 1998 (age 27)
- Height: 1.77 m (5 ft 10 in)
- Weight: 62 kg (137 lb)

Sport
- Sport: Swimming
Medal record
Women's swimming
Representing South Africa
Event	1st	2nd	3rd
Commonwealth Games	0	3	3
African Games	8	2	0
African Championships	5	4	0
Summer Universiade	0	4	0
Total	13	13	3
Commonwealth Games
Silver medal – second place	2022 Birmingham	50 m butterfly
Silver medal – second place	2026 Glasgow	50 m butterfly
Silver medal – second place	2026 Glasgow	4×100 m mixed relay
Bronze medal – third place	2026 Glasgow	100 m butterfly
Bronze medal – third place	2026 Glasgow	4×100 m relay
Bronze medal – third place	2026 Glasgow	4×100 m medley relay
African Games
Gold medal – first place	2019 Rabat	50 m freestyle
Gold medal – first place	2019 Rabat	50 m backstroke
Gold medal – first place	2019 Rabat	100 m freestyle
Gold medal – first place	2019 Rabat	4×100 m freestyle
Gold medal – first place	2019 Rabat	4×100 m medley
Gold medal – first place	2019 Rabat	4×100 m mixed freestyle
Gold medal – first place	2019 Rabat	4×100 m mixed medley
Gold medal – first place	2019 Rabat	4×200 m freestyle
Silver medal – second place	2019 Rabat	50 m butterfly
Silver medal – second place	2019 Rabat	100 m butterfly
African Championships
Gold medal – first place	2018 Bloemfontein	50 m backstroke
Gold medal – first place	2018 Bloemfontein	100 m freestyle
Gold medal – first place	2018 Bloemfontein	4×100 m freestlye
Gold medal – first place	2018 Bloemfontein	4×100 m medley
Gold medal – first place	2018 Bloemfontein	4×200 m freestyle
Silver medal – second place	2018 Bloemfontein	50 m freestyle
Silver medal – second place	2018 Bloemfontein	50 m butterfly
Silver medal – second place	2018 Bloemfontein	100 m butterfly
Silver medal – second place	2018 Bloemfontein	4×100 m mixed freestyle
Summer Universiade
Silver medal – second place	2021 Chengdu	50 m freestyle
Silver medal – second place	2021 Chengdu	100 m freestyle
Silver medal – second place	2021 Chengdu	50 m butterfly
Silver medal – second place	2021 Chengdu	100 m butterfly

Erin Gallagher (born 18 December 1998) is a South African swimmer. She competed in the women's 100 metre freestyle event at the 2017 World Aquatics Championships. In 2019, she represented South Africa at the 2019 African Games held in Rabat, Morocco.

She competed in the women's 100 metre freestyle, the women's 100 metre butterfly, the women's 4 x 200 metre freestyle relay, and the women's 4 x 100 metre medley relay at the 2020 Summer Olympics.

For the 2022 World Aquatics Championships, Gallagher was named to the South Africa roster in the 100 metre freestyle based on her performances at the 2022 South Africa National Swimming Championships. She was later named to the South Africa team for the 2022 Commonwealth Games.

On day one of swimming at the 2022 Commonwealth Games, in Birmingham, England, Gallagher ranked ninth in the preliminaries of the 100 metre butterfly, qualifying for the semifinals with a time of 59.29 seconds. She placed ninth in the semifinals with a time of 59.02 seconds. The second day, she finished fifth in her 50 metre freestyle preliminaries heat and qualified for the semifinals. Achieving a fourth-place finish in semifinal heat one, she qualified for the final ranking seventh. Later in the same session, she anchored the 4×100 metre freestyle relay with a 54.73 in the final to help place fourth. On day three, she qualified for the semifinals of the 50 metre butterfly, ranking tenth in the preliminaries with a time of 26.96 seconds. In the semifinals, she set a new South African record with a time of 26.17 seconds and qualified for the final ranking second. For her second event of the session, the final of the 50 metre freestyle, she placed eighth with a time of 25.39 seconds. In her third and final event of the day, she helped place fourth in the 4×200 metre freestyle relay.

Ranking thirteenth in the preliminaries of the 100 metre freestyle on day four of the 2022 Commonwealth Games, she qualified for the semifinals of the event. After withdrawing from the 100 metre freestyle semifinals, she lowered her South African record in the 50 metre butterfly in the final of the event, finishing in 26.05 seconds to tie Holly Barratt of Australia for the silver medal. Two days later, on the final day of the swimming competition, she helped set new African and South African records in the final of the 4×100 metre medley relay, splitting a 58.80 for the butterfly leg to contribute to the fourth-place time of 3:59.63.
