= Aaliyah Palestrini =

Seychellois swimmer

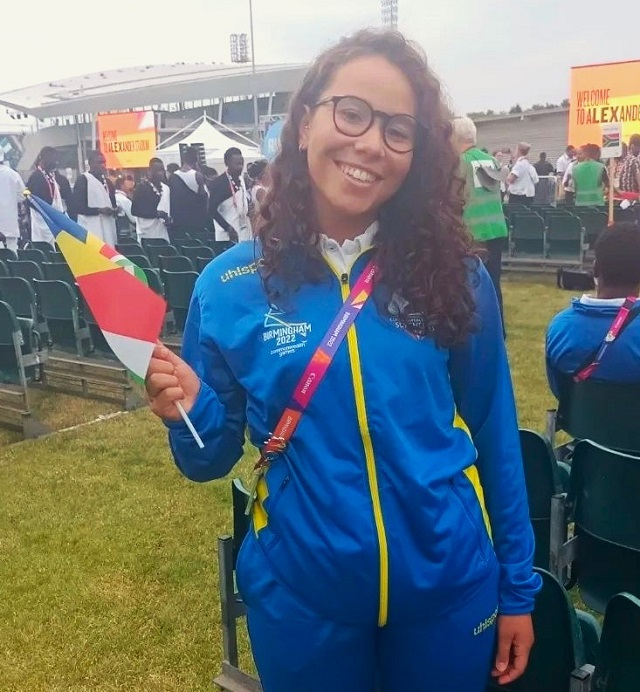
- Palestrini in 2022

Personal information
- Born: 1 October 2003 (age 22)

Sport
- Sport: Swimming

Aaliyah Palestrini (born 1 October 2003) is a Seychelloise swimmer. She represented Seychelles at the 2019 World Aquatics Championships held in Gwangju, South Korea. She competed in the women's 50 metre breaststroke and women's 50 metre butterfly events. In both events she did not advance to compete in the semi-finals. She also competed in the 4 × 100 metre mixed freestyle relay event.

In 2018, she competed in the girls' 50 metre backstroke and girls' 100 metre freestyle events at the Summer Youth Olympics held in Buenos Aires, Argentina.

In 2024, she competed in the Africa Aquatics Zone 4 Championships and won the women's 50m backstroke in the 17-29 category.
