= Lina Khiyara =

Moroccan swimmer (born 2003)

Personal information
- National team: Morocco
- Born: 29 May 2003 (age 23) Liège, Belgium

Sport
- Sport: Swimming
- Club: Raja Natation
- College team: New Mexico State University

Lina Khiyara (born 29 May 2003) is a Moroccan swimmer.

She represented Morocco at the 2019 World Aquatics Championships in Gwangju, South Korea. She competed in the women's 50 metre freestyle and women's 100 metre freestyle events. In both events she did not advance to compete in the semi-finals. She also represented Morocco at the 2019 African Games held in Rabat, Morocco without winning a medal. She competed in six events and in the 4 × 100 metre mixed freestyle relay event.

She competed in the women's 200 metre freestyle event at the 2020 Summer Olympics held in Tokyo, Japan. She competed in the women's 100 metre freestyle and women's 200 metre freestyle events at the 2021 FINA World Swimming Championships (25 m) held in Abu Dhabi, United Arab Emirates. She also competed in several events at the 2022 World Aquatics Championships held in Budapest, Hungary.

She has committed to compete for New Mexico State University at the collegiate level.
