= Therese Soukup =

Seychellois swimmer (born 2003)

Personal information
- Nationality: Seychellois
- Born: 8 July 2003 (age 23) Victoria, Mahé, Seychelles
- Height: 176 cm (5 ft 9 in)
- Weight: 62 kg (137 lb)

Sport
- Sport: Swimming

Therese Soukup (born 8 July 2003) is a Seychellois swimmer. She competed in the women's 50 metre backstroke event at the 2018 FINA World Swimming Championships (25 m), in Hangzhou, China.
