= Simon Bachmann =

Seychellois swimmer

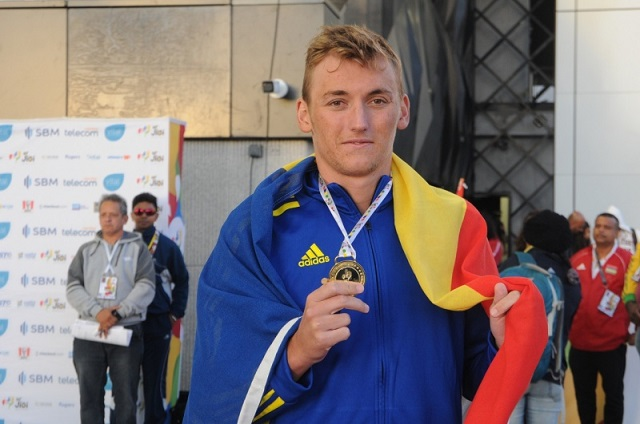
- Bachmann after winning a gold medal at the 2019 Indian Ocean Island Games

Personal information
- Nationality: Seychelles
- Born: 17 February 1999 (age 26)

Sport
- Sport: Swimming

Simon Bachmann (born 17 February 1999) is a Seychellois swimmer.

== Career ==
Bachmann competed in the 2019 Indian Ocean Island Games and won a gold medal in the 100 m butterfly competition. He competed in the 1,500 m freestyle in the 2020 Summer Olympics.
