= Robyn Lee =

Zimbabwean swimmer (born 1999)

Personal information
- Full name: Robyn Stacie Lee
- Born: 8 January 1999 (age 27)

Sport
- Sport: Swimming
Medal record
Women's swimming
Representing Zimbabwe
African Games
Bronze medal – third place	2019 Rabat	200 m backstroke

Robyn Lee (born 8 January 1999) is a Zimbabwean swimmer. She competed in the women's 100 metre backstroke event at the 2017 World Aquatics Championships. In 2019, she represented Zimbabwe at the 2019 African Games held in Rabat, Morocco and she won the bronze medal in the women's 200 metre backstroke event.
