= Royal Moroccan Swimming Federation =

Moroccan sports organization

Royal Moroccan Swimming Federation (French: Royale Marocaine de Natation) (FRMN) is the national federation which oversees aquatic sports in Morocco. FRMN oversees competition within Morocco in swimming, diving, water polo, synchronized swimming, and open water swimming. It was founded in 1956 and is currently based in Casablanca, Morocco.

FRMN is affiliated to:

- CNOM, the Moroccan National Olympic Committee (Comité National Olympique Marocain).
- FINA, the International Swimming Federation,
- CANA, the African Swimming Confederation.

== See also ==
- List of Moroccan records in swimming
