= Felicity Passon =

Seychellois swimmer (born 1999)

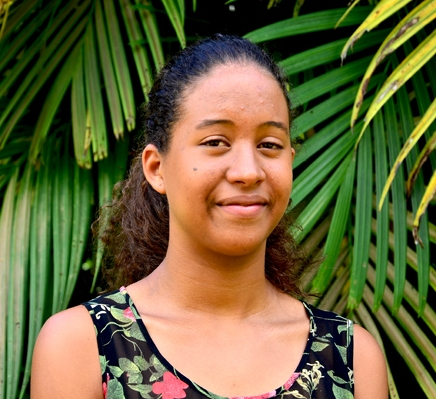
- Felicity Passon (2014)

Personal information
- Full name: Felicity Elizabeth Passon
- Nationality: Seychellois
- Born: 11 July 1999 (age 26)

Sport
- Sport: Swimming
Medal record
Women's swimming
Representing Seychelles
African Games
Gold medal – first place	2019 Rabat	100 m backstroke
Gold medal – first place	2019 Rabat	200 m backstroke
Silver medal – second place	2019 Rabat	50 m backstroke
Bronze medal – third place	2019 Rabat	100 m butterfly

Felicity Elizabeth Passon (born 11 July 1999) is a Seychellois swimmer. She competed in the women's 50-metre freestyle at the 2019 World Aquatics Championships. She represented Seychelles at the 2019 African Games, winning two gold medals, one silver medal and one bronze medal, and qualified for the Tokyo 2020 Olympics.

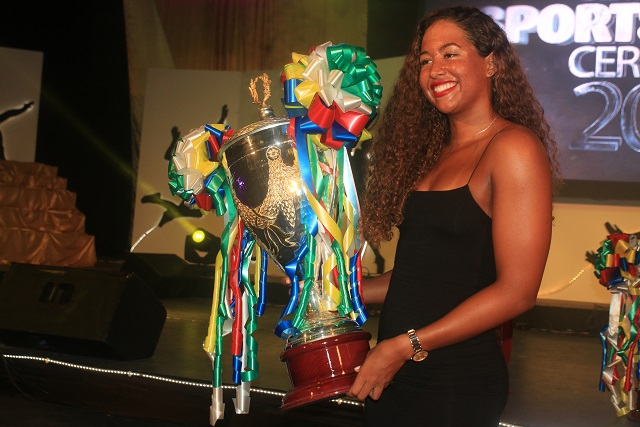
Receiving the Seychelles Sportswoman of the Year 2019 Award

Felicity Passon completed a 15-kilometre swim challenge in April 2021 to raise funds for mental health awareness and support. It took her 4 hours 6 minutes to swim from La Digue to Praslin, Seychelles' third and second most populated islands, and then back to La Digue.

She competed at the collegiate level for the University of Arizona in 2021.

In March 2024, Felicity Passon was crowned Seychelles' Sportswoman of the Year 2023. The next year, in July 2024, the Seychelles Aquatic Federation announced her retirement from professional swimming.

Olympic Games
Preceded by Rodney Govinden	Flag bearer for Seychelles; Tokyo 2020; With: Rodney Govinden	Succeeded by Khema Elizabeth; Dylan Sicobo
