= Khema Elizabeth =

Seychellois swimmer (born 2005)

Personal information
- National team: Seychelles
- Born: May 27, 2005 (age 21)

Sport
- Sport: Swimming

Khema Elizabeth (born 27 May 2005) is a swimmer from the Seychelles, for whom she has competed at the Olympic Games and the World Aquatics Championships.

== Career ==
She finished fifth in the 50m breaststroke at the 2019 Indian Ocean Island Games in Mauritius.

She competed at the 2021 FINA World Swimming Championships in Abu Dhabi in the women's 50 metres butterfly as well as the 100 metres freestyle and the relays. She competed in Budapest at the 2022 World Aquatics Championships in the women's 50 metre freestyle. She won eight medals including three gold, one silver and four bronze at the 12th Commission de la Jeunesse et des Sports de l'Océan Indien (CJSOI) Games held in December 2022 in Mauritius.

She won bronze medals at the 2023 Indian Ocean Island Games in Madagascar, with the women's 4x100 freestyle relay team and the 4x100 mixed medley relay team. That year, she won nine medals at the Winter National Swimming Championship, held at the sports complex of Côte d’Or in Mauritius.

She was selected to compete at the 2024 Paris Olympics, to compete in the 50 metres freestyle. She was also given the honour of being flag bearer for her country at the opening ceremony.
