= Flag of Morocco =

Kingdom of Morocco
- Use: National flag and state ensign
- Proportion: 2:3
- Adopted: 17 November 1915; 111 years ago
- Design: A red field with a green pentagram, a five-pointed linear star.
- Designed by: Mawlay Yusef

The flag of Morocco (علم المغرب) (French: Drapeau de Maroc) is the flag used by the government of Morocco and has served as the national flag of Morocco since 17 November 1915. It has a red field with a green pentagram in the center. The green star represents the five pillars of Islam, and the red represents the blood of the ancestors and unity.

Red has considerable historic significance in Morocco by virtue of its association with the Alawi dynasty, which used a red field as its flag. The ruling house was associated with the Islamic prophet Muhammad via Fatima, the wife of Ali, the fourth Muslim Caliph. Red is also the color that was used by the sharifs of Mecca and the imams of Yemen.

On 17 November 1915, Sultan Yusef signed a dahir introducing the current flag design.

While Morocco was under French and Spanish control, the red flag with the pentagram remained in use but only inland since its use at sea was prohibited. After national independence in 1956, it was allowed to also serve as the maritime flag.

== Design ==
The legal definition of the flag specifies that the colours are bright red and palm green. No more precise colour specifications are known to be published. The RGB colours used in the illustration on the kingdom's website are listed below, along with rough CMYK and Pantone equivalents for printing.

| Colour scheme | Bright Red | Palm Green |
|---|---|---|
| RGB | 183, 49, 44 | 0, 99, 65 |
| Hexadecimal | #B7312C | #006341 |
| CMYK | 0, 73, 76, 28 | 100, 0, 34, 61 |
| Pantone | 7620 C | 3425 C |

=== Construction sheet ===
Construction sheet of the flag of Morocco

=== Variants ===
Non-interlaced pentagram

Thicker non-interlaced pentagram

Interlaced pentagram

1/6 circle interlaced pentagram

== History ==
In the 17th century, when Morocco became ruled by the current 'Alawid dynasty, its flag was solid red at first. The Sharifs of Makkah used that as a reference colour.

To be known from this book, may God uphold its value and to be around the centre of grace and joy its orbit, that due to the promotion of our Sherifian Kingdom affairs, the spread of its glory and its pride, the need to assign a flag that distinct it from the rest of the kingdoms as that our sacred ancestors flag use to be very similar to some other flags especially the ones used in the marine signs, our noble vision decided to distinct our joyful flag by making the five-pointed seal of Solomon in the middle in green, asking the almighty god to keep it waving with the winds of fortune and ambition for this time and the becoming, Amen and peace.

— Mawlay Yusef, 17 November 1915

In accordance with the seventh article of the constitution, the emblem of the Kingdom shall be a red flag with a five-pointed green star in the center.

The flag shall be made with fabric of bright red, opaque and rectangular in shape. The star shall be open, palm green, made of five continuous branches and woven in the same fabric where it must be visible on both sides of the flag. One of its points must point upwards. The hoist [vertical dimension of a flag] of the flag equals two thirds (2/3) of its fly [horizontal length of a flag]. The star is inscribed in an invisible circle whose radius equals one sixth (1/6) of the flag's fly [horizontal length of a flag] and whose centre is the intersection point of the invisible diagonal lines of the flag's rectangular shape.

The width of each one of the branches of the star shall be 1/20 of its length.

— Mohammed VI, 23 November 2005

Wide and vertical presentations

On 8 May 2010, a Moroccan flag with a size of 60,409.78 square metres (650,000 sq ft; 14.9 acres), weighing 20,000 kilograms (22 short tons), was set in Dakhla, a city in the disputed territory of Western Sahara. It was certified by Guinness World Records as the largest flag ever draped.

=== Other historical flags ===
Flag of Morocco under the Alawi dynasty (1666–1915)

Flag of the Republic of the Rif (1921–1926)

Merchant flag of the French protectorate in Morocco (1919–1956)

Merchant flag of the Spanish protectorate in Morocco (1937–1956)

Merchant flag of the Tangier International Zone (1953–1957)

== Other national flags ==
Civil ensign

Naval ensign

Naval jack

Royal flag

Royal standard

== See also ==
- Coat of arms of Morocco
- List of Moroccan flags
- Flag of Vietnam, a very similar flag
- Bonnie Blue flag, a similar flag that has an inverse design
