= List of World Aquatics member federations =

This is a list of national federations that are members of World Aquatics, the international federation for swimming and water sports. As of 29 July 2025, there are 210 countries/members (one national federation is allowed per sport nation).

== Continental Associations ==
Members are grouped by continent, and there are 5 continental associations of which they can choose to be a member:

- Africa (53): Africa Aquatics
- Americas (45): PanAm Aquatics
- Asia (45): Asia Aquatics
- Europe (52): European Aquatics
- Oceania (15): Oceania Aquatics

Note: The number following each continental name is the number of FINA members which fall into the given geographical area. It is not necessarily the number of members in the continental association.

== List of FINA National Federations ==
This list is based on the FINA Directory, with founding and affiliated dates coming from FINA's 2009 membership report.

Code	Country	Continent	Founded	Affiliated
AFG	Afghanistan	Asia		2008
AGU	Anguilla	Americas		2017
ALB	Albania	Europe	1931	1991
ALG	Algeria	Africa	1962	1963
AND	Andorra	Europe	1986	1986
ANG	Angola	Africa	1976	1980
ANT	Antigua and Barbuda	Americas	1986	1986
ARG	Argentina	Americas	1921	1924
ARM	Armenia	Europe	1993	1993
ARU	Aruba	Americas	1969	1985
ASA	American Samoa	Oceania	2003	2004
AUS	Australia	Oceania	1909	1909
AUT	Austria	Europe	1899	1909
AZE	Azerbaijan	Europe	1992	1993
BAH	Bahamas	Americas		1952
BAN	Bangladesh	Asia		1974
BAR	Barbados	Americas	1947	1951
BDI	Burundi	Africa	1994	2000
BEL	Belgium	Europe	1902	1908
BEN	Benin	Africa	2000	2001
BER	Bermuda	Americas	1974	1974
BIH	Bosnia and Herzegovina	Europe	1946/1992	1993
BIZ	Belize	Americas		
BHU	Bhutan	Asia		2017
BLR	Belarus	Europe	1959	1992
BOL	Bolivia	Americas	1935	1936
BOT	Botswana	Africa		2006
BRA	Brazil	Americas	1977	1978
BRN	Bahrain	Asia	1974	1979
BRU	Brunei	Asia		1984
BUL	Bulgaria	Europe	1931	1933
BUR	Burkina Faso	Africa	2000	2001
CAF	Central African Republic	Africa	2009	2009
CAM	Cambodia	Asia	1994	1996
CAN	Canada	Americas	1909	1910
CAY	Cayman Islands	Americas		1987
CGO	Congo	Africa	1970	1976
CHA	Chad	Africa		2004
CHI	Chile	Americas	1920	1926
CHN	China	Asia	1957	1979
CIV	Côte d'Ivoire	Africa	1960	1961
CMR	Cameroon	Africa		1984
COD	DR Congo	Africa		2008
COK	Cook Islands	Oceania		1998
COL	Colombia	Americas	1939	1940
COM	Comoros	Africa		1998
CPV	Cape Verde	Africa		2009
CRC	Costa Rica	Americas		1963
CRO	Croatia	Europe	1991	1992
CUB	Cuba	Americas	1920	1928
CUR	Curaçao	Americas		1928
CYP	Cyprus	Europe	1972	1973
CZE	Czech Republic	Europe	1919/1993	1919/1993
DEN	Denmark	Europe	1907	1908
DJI	Djibouti	Africa		2009
DMA	Dominica	Americas		1992
DOM	Dominican Republic	Americas	1974	1974
ECU	Ecuador	Americas	1982	1982
EGY	Egypt	Africa	1910	1924
ERI	Eritrea	Africa		2009
ESA	El Salvador	Americas	1950	1950
ESP	Spain	Europe	1920	1920
EST	Estonia	Europe	1910	1991
ETH	Ethiopia	Africa	1980	1985
FAR	Faroe Islands	Europe		1981
FIJ	Fiji	Oceania	1963	1964
FIN	Finland	Europe	1906	1908
FRA	France	Europe	1920	1908
FSM	Federated States of Micronesia	Oceania	1997	1998
GAB	Gabon	Africa		
GAM	Gambia	Africa		2009
GBR	(United Kingdom) Great Britain	Europe	1909	1908
GBS	Guinea-Bissau	Africa		2004
GEO	Georgia	Europe	1991	1992
GEQ	Equatorial Guinea	Africa	2000	2000
GER	Germany	Europe	1886	1908
GHA	Ghana	Africa		2004
GIB	Gibraltar	Europe	1946	1966
GRE	Greece	Europe	1927	1921
GRN	Grenada	Americas	1992	1992
GUA	Guatemala	Americas		1949
GUI	Guinea	Africa		
GUM	Guam	Oceania	1965	1966
GUY	Guyana	Americas	1973	1993
HAI	Haiti	Americas		2014
HKG	Hong Kong	Asia	1951	1951
HON	Honduras	Americas		1974
HUN	Hungary	Europe	1907	1908
INA	Indonesia	Asia	1951	1952
IND	India	Asia		1936
IRI	Iran	Asia	1946	1947
IRL	(Republic of Ireland) Ireland	Europe	1893	1927
IRQ	Iraq	Asia	1956	1957
ISL	Iceland	Europe	1951	1951
ISR	Israel	Europe	1951	1952
ISV	(United States Virgin Islands) Virgin Islands	Americas		1973
ITA	Italy	Europe	1899	1909
IVB	British Virgin Islands	Americas		2008
JAM	Jamaica	Americas		1936
JOR	Jordan	Asia	1976	1984
JPN	Japan	Asia		1920
KAZ	Kazakhstan	Asia	1992	1991
KEN	Kenya	Africa	1953	1954
KGZ	Kyrgyzstan	Asia	1994	1995
KOR	South Korea	Asia	1946	1948
KOS	Kosovo	Europe		2015
KSA	Saudi Arabia	Asia	1974	1976
KUW	Kuwait	Asia	1964	1968
LAO	Laos	Asia	1995	2000
LAT	Latvia	Europe	1905/1988	1932/1991
LBA	Libya	Africa		1963
LBN	Lebanon	Asia	1961	1961
LBR	Liberia	Africa	1999	2001
LCA	Saint Lucia	Americas	1988	1989
LES	Lesotho	Africa		2001
LIE	Liechtenstein	Europe	1981	1982
LTU	Lithuania	Europe	1924/1990	1992
LUX	Luxembourg	Europe	1924	1924
MAA	Sint Maarten	Americas	2010	2014
MAC	Macau	Asia	1956	1988
MAD	Madagascar	Africa	1964	1992
MAR	Morocco	Africa	1956	1957
MAS	Malaysia	Asia	1955	1955
MAW	Malawi	Africa	2000	2000
MDA	Moldova	Europe	1989	1992
MDV	Maldives	Asia	1983	1984
MEX	Mexico	Americas	1959	1960
MGL	Mongolia	Asia		1996
MHL	Marshall Islands	Oceania		1987
MKD	North Macedonia	Europe	1947	1993
MLI	Mali	Africa		1968/1975
MLT	Malta	Europe	1925	1928
MNE	Montenegro	Europe		2006
MON	Monaco	Europe	1976	1977
MOZ	Mozambique	Africa		1980
MRI	Mauritius	Africa	1975	1976
MTN	Mauritania	Africa	2000	2001
MYA	Myanmar	Asia	1948	1952/1994
NAM	Namibia	Africa	1963	1989
NCA	Nicaragua	Americas	1961	1962
NED	Netherlands	Europe	1888	1909
NEP	Nepal	Asia		1984
NGR	Nigeria	Africa	1958	1958
NIG	Niger	Africa		1964
NMA	Northern Mariana Islands	Oceania	1974	1986
NOR	Norway	Europe	1910	1912
NZL	New Zealand	Oceania	1890	1910
OMA	Oman	Asia	1975	1981
PAK	Pakistan	Asia	1948	1948
PAN	Panama	Americas		1950
PAR	Paraguay	Americas		1954
PER	Peru	Americas	1926	1928
PHI	Philippines	Asia	1927	1928
PLE	Palestine	Asia	1993	1999
PLW	Palau	Oceania		1996
PNG	Papua New Guinea	Oceania		1997
POL	Poland	Europe	1922	1923
POR	Portugal	Europe	1930	1930
PRK	North Korea	Asia	1946	1964
PUR	Puerto Rico	Americas	1957	1958
QAT	Qatar	Asia	1992	1993
ROU	Romania	Europe	1930	1923
RSA	South Africa	Africa	1908	1994
RUS	Russia	Europe	1991	1992
RWA	Rwanda	Africa	2000	2000
SAM	Samoa	Oceania	1998	1998
SEN	Senegal	Africa	1962	1962
SEY	Seychelles	Africa	1985	1987
SKN	Saint Kitts and Nevis	Americas		2009
SLE	Sierra Leone	Africa		1990
SLO	Slovenia	Europe	1922	1992
SMR	San Marino	Europe	1980	1981
SOL	Solomon Islands	Oceania	2009	1998
SOM	Somalia	Africa	1993	2005
SGP	Singapore	Asia	1939	1993
SRB	Serbia	Europe	1921	1923
SRI	Sri Lanka	Asia	1975	1975
STP	São Tomé and Príncipe	Africa		
SUD	Sudan	Africa		1961
SUI	Switzerland	Europe	1918	1920
SUR	Suriname	Americas	1953	1972
SVK	Slovakia	Europe	1990	1993
SWE	Sweden	Europe	1904	1908
SWZ	Swaziland	Africa	1979	1980
SYR	Syrian Arab Republic	Asia	1948	1952
TAN	United Republic of Tanzania	Africa	2006	2006
TCN	Turks and Caicos Islands	Americas	1996	2001
TGA	Tonga	Oceania		2010
THA	Thailand	Asia	1958	1959
TJK	Tajikistan	Asia	1996	1996
TKM	Turkmenistan	Asia		1995
TLS	Timor-Leste	Asia		
TOG	Togo	Africa		1984
TPE	Chinese Taipei	Asia	1973	1978
TTO	Trinidad and Tobago	Americas	1949	1951
TUN	Tunisia	Africa		1957
TUR	Turkey	Europe		1928
UAE	United Arab Emirates	Asia	1974	1981
UGA	Uganda	Africa		1995
UKR	Ukraine	Europe	1990	1992
URU	Uruguay	Americas	1918	1920
USA	(United States) USA	Americas	1909	1909
UZB	Uzbekistan	Asia	1974	1981
VAN	Vanuatu	Oceania		2009
VEN	Venezuela	Americas	1950	1955
VIE	Vietnam	Asia	1963	1952/1983
VIN	Saint Vincent and the Grenadines	Americas		1998
YEM	Yemen	Asia		2003
ZAM	Zambia	Africa		1963
ZIM	Zimbabwe	Africa	1915	1980

The Netherlands Antilles (AHO) was a member prior to its sports-nation status dissolution in 2011–2012; Curaçao and Sint Maarten originated out of that. Tahiti (TAH) was also a member from 1992 onwards, but as of 2016 is no longer listed as a member on FINA's website.

As of 2025, IOC members Kiribati, Nauru, South Sudan and Tuvalu are not members of World Aquatics.

Anguilla, Curaçao, Faroe Islands, Gibraltar, Macau, Northern Mariana Islands, Sint Maarten, and Turks and Caicos Islands are not IOC members.
