= Tennis at the 2019 African Games =

- Venue: Railway Club
- Location: Rabat, Morocco
- Dates: 23–31 August
- Competitors: 107 from 25 nations

Tennis at the 2019 African Games

Champions

Men's singles
- Mohamed Safwat; Egypt

Women's singles
- Mayar Sherif; Egypt

Men's doubles
- Tunisia (TUN); Aziz Dougaz; Skander Mansouri

Women's doubles
- Egypt (EGY); Rana Sherif Ahmed; Mayar Sherif

Men's team
- Morocco (MAR); Lamine Ouahab; Adam Moundir; Anas Fattar; Yassir Kilani

Women's team
- Egypt (EGY); Lamis Salama; Sandra Samir; Rana Sherif Ahmed; Mayar Sherif
- African Games

Tennis at the 2019 African Games was held from 23 to 31 August 2019 in Rabat, Morocco.

The event served as a qualifier for the 2020 Summer Olympics in Tokyo, Japan.

== Participating nations ==
- Benin (2)
- Botswana (4)
- Burundi (4)
- Democratic Republic of the Congo (4)
- Egypt (8)
- Equatorial Guinea (2)
- Ethiopia (8)
- Gabon (4)
- Ghana (6)
- Guinea (2)
- Ivory Coast (4)
- Kenya (8)
- Lesotho (2)
- Madagascar (6)
- Mali (2)
- Mauritania (1)
- Morocco (8)
- Namibia (7)
- Nigeria (8)
- Sierra Leone (2)
- South Africa (1)
- Togo (2)
- Tunisia (4)
- Uganda (2)
- Zimbabwe (6)

== Medalists ==
=== Men ===
Event	Gold	Silver	Bronze
Singles	Mohamed Safwat; Egypt	Karim-Mohamed Maamoun; Egypt	Adam Moundir; Morocco
Singles	Mohamed Safwat; Egypt	Karim-Mohamed Maamoun; Egypt	Aziz Dougaz; Tunisia
Doubles	Tunisia (TUN); Aziz Dougaz; Skander Mansouri	Morocco (MAR); Adam Moundir; Lamine Ouahab	Egypt (EGY); Karim-Mohamed Maamoun; Sherif Sabry
Doubles	Tunisia (TUN); Aziz Dougaz; Skander Mansouri	Morocco (MAR); Adam Moundir; Lamine Ouahab	Egypt (EGY); Akram El Sallaly; Mohamed Safwat
Team	Morocco (MAR); Lamine Ouahab; Adam Moundir; Anas Fattar; Yassir Kilani	Egypt (EGY); Akram El Sallaly; Karim-Mohamed Maamoun; Mohamed Safwat; Sherif Sabry	Tunisia (TUN); Aziz Dougaz; Skander Mansouri

=== Women ===
Event	Gold	Silver	Bronze
Singles	Mayar Sherif; Egypt	Chanel Simmonds; South Africa	Lamis Salama; Egypt
Singles	Mayar Sherif; Egypt	Chanel Simmonds; South Africa	Sandra Samir; Egypt
Doubles	Egypt (EGY); Rana Sherif Ahmed; Mayar Sherif	Egypt (EGY); Lamis Salama; Sandra Samir	Nigeria (NGR); Adesuwa Osabuohien; Barakat Quadre
Doubles	Egypt (EGY); Rana Sherif Ahmed; Mayar Sherif	Egypt (EGY); Lamis Salama; Sandra Samir	Morocco (MAR); Sara Akid; Rania Azziz
Team	Egypt (EGY); Lamis Salama; Sandra Samir; Rana Sherif Ahmed; Mayar Sherif	Morocco (MAR); Sara Akid; Rania Azziz; Rita Atik; Salma Ziouti	Nigeria (NGR); Adesuwa Osabuohien; Barakat Quadre; Blessing Samuel Audu; Aanu Enita Mercy Aiyegbusi

== Medal table ==
* Host nation (Morocco)

Rank	NOC	Gold	Silver	Bronze	Total
1	Egypt (EGY)	4	3	4	11
2	Morocco (MAR)*	1	2	2	5
3	Tunisia (TUN)	1	0	2	3
4	South Africa (RSA)	0	1	0	1
5	Nigeria (NGR)	0	0	2	2
Totals (5 entries)		6	6	10	22
