= Chess at the 2019 African Games =

- Venue: Grand Mogador City Center
- Location: Casablanca, Morocco
- Dates: 24–28 August

Chess at the 2019 African Games was held from 24 to 28 August 2019 in Casablanca, Morocco.

== Participating nations ==
- Algeria
- Angola
- Botswana
- Cape Verde
- Central African Republic
- Djibouti
- Eritrea
- Ethiopia
- Kenya
- Libya
- Malawi
- Mali
- Mauritania
- Morocco
- Namibia
- Nigeria
- São Tomé and Príncipe
- Sierra Leone
- Tunisia
- Uganda
- Zambia
- Zimbabwe

== Medal table ==
Rank	Nation	Gold	Silver	Bronze	Total
1	Egypt (EGY)	5	3	0	8
2	Algeria (ALG)	0	1	3	4
3	Zambia (ZAM)	0	1	0	1
4	Uganda (UGA)	0	0	1	1
4	Zimbabwe (ZIM)	0	0	1	1
Totals (5 entries)		5	5	5	15

== Medal summary ==
Event	Gold	Silver	Bronze
Rapid Mixed Team	Egypt; Ahmed Adly; Bassem Amin; Shrook Wafa; Shahenda Wafa	Algeria; Bilel Bellahcene; Adlane Arab; Lina Nassr; Sabrina Latreche	Zimbabwe; Rodwell Makoto; Emarald Takudzwa Mushore; Linda Dalitso Shaba; Colletah Wakuruwarewa
Rapid Men Individual	Ahmed Adly; Egypt	Bassem Amin; Egypt	Harold Wanyama; Uganda
Rapid Women Individual	Shrook Wafa; Egypt	Makumba Lorita Mwango; Zambia	Sabrina Latreche; Algeria
Blitz Men Individual	Bassem Amin; Egypt	Ahmed Adly; Egypt	Bilel Bellahcene; Algeria
Blitz Women Individual	Shrook Wafa; Egypt	Shahenda Wafa; Egypt	Lina Nassr; Algeria
