= Swimming at the 2019 African Games – Men's 1500 metre freestyle =

Swimming competition

Men's 1500 metre freestyle at the 2019 African Games
- Venue: Mohammed V Sports Complex – Olympic Pool
- Dates: 24 August
- Competitors: 7 from 5 nations
- Winning time: 15:19.49

Medalists
| gold medal | Ahmed Akram | Egypt |
| silver medal | Mohamed Agili | Tunisia |
| bronze medal | Marwan El-Amrawy | Egypt |

The Men's 1500 metre freestyle competition of the 2019 African Games was held on 24 August 2019.

== Records ==
Prior to the competition, the existing world and championship records were as follows.

| | Name | Nation | Time | Location | Date |
|---|---|---|---|---|---|
| World record | Sun Yang | China | 14:31.02 | London | 4 August 2012 |
| African record | Oussama Mellouli | Tunisia | 14:37.28 | Rome | 2 August 2009 |
| Games record | Ahmed Akram | Egypt | 15:11.68 | Brazzaville | 10 September 2015 |

== Results ==
| Rank | Lane | Name | Nationality | Time | Notes |
|---|---|---|---|---|---|
| 1st place, gold medalist(s) | 4 | Ahmed Akram | Egypt | 15:19.49 | |
| 2nd place, silver medalist(s) | 5 | Mohamed Agili | Tunisia | 15:26.15 | |
| 3rd place, bronze medalist(s) | 3 | Marwan El-Amrawy | Egypt | 15:32.43 | |
| 4 | 1 | Mohamed Djaballah | Algeria | 15:48.50 | NR |
| 5 | 6 | Roberto Gomes | South Africa | 15:48.53 | |
| 6 | 2 | Michael McGlynn | South Africa | 15:56.97 | |
| 7 | 8 | João Duarte | Angola | 17:50.14 | |
| | 7 | Lounis Khendriche | Algeria | Did not start | |
