= Swimming at the 2019 African Games – Men's 800 metre freestyle =

Men's 800 metre freestyle at the 2019 African Games
- Venue: Mohammed V Sports Complex – Olympic Pool
- Dates: 21 August
- Competitors: 10 from 7 nations
- Winning time: 7:57.21

Medalists
gold medal	Ahmed Akram	Egypt
silver medal	Mohamed Agili	Tunisia
bronze medal	Marwan Elkamash	Egypt

The Men's 800 metre freestyle competition of the 2019 African Games was held on 21 August 2019.

== Records ==
Prior to the competition, the existing world and championship records were as follows.

	Name	Nation	Time	Location	Date
World record	Zhang Lin	China	7:32.12	Rome	29 July 2009
African record	Oussama Mellouli	Tunisia	7:35.27	Rome	29 July 2009
Games record	Ahmed Akram	Egypt	7:55.36	Brazzaville	7 September 2015

== Results ==
Rank	Heat	Lane	Name	Nationality	Time	Notes
1st place, gold medalist(s)	2	5	Ahmed Akram	Egypt	7:57.21	
2nd place, silver medalist(s)	2	3	Mohamed Agili	Tunisia	7:57.87	
3rd place, bronze medalist(s)	2	4	Marwan Elkamash	Egypt	8:06.90	
4	2	7	Mohamed Djaballah	Algeria	8:08.88	NR
5	2	6	Brent Szurdoki	South Africa	8:12.87	
6	2	2	Michael McGlynn	South Africa	8:27.52	
7	2	1	Damien Otogbe	Togo	9:20.11	
8	1	4	João Duarte	Angola	9:22.57	
9	1	5	Solomon Beraki	Eritrea	12:11.63	
10	1	3	Nejim Tesfay	Eritrea	13:20.33	
