= Swimming at the 2019 African Games – Men's 100 metre freestyle =

Men's 100 metre freestyle at the 2019 African Games
- Venue: Mohammed V Sports Complex – Olympic Pool
- Dates: 21 August (heats and final)
- Competitors: 34 from 24 nations
- Winning time: 48.97

Medalists
gold medal	Oussama Sahnoune	Algeria
silver medal	Ali Khalafalla	Egypt
bronze medal	Mohamed Hassan	Egypt

The Men's 100 metre freestyle competition of the 2019 African Games was held on 21 August 2019.

== Records ==
Prior to the competition, the existing world and championship records were as follows.

	Name	Nation	Time	Location	Date
World record	César Cielo	Brazil	46.91	Rome	30 July 2009
African record	Lyndon Ferns	South Africa	47.79	Rome	29 July 2009
Games record	Salim Iles	Algeria	49.38	Algiers	12 July 2007

The following new records were set during this competition.

Date	Event	Name	Nation	Time	Record
21 August	Final	Oussama Sahnoune	Algeria	48.97	GR

== Results ==
=== Heats ===
The heats were started on 21 August at 10:30.

Rank	Heat	Lane	Name	Nationality	Time	Notes
1	3	4	Mohamed Hassan	Egypt	50.47	Q
2	4	4	Ali Khalafalla	Egypt	50.62	Q
3	3	5	Douglas Erasmus	South Africa	50.65	Q
4	5	3	Xander Skinner	Namibia	50.86	Q
5	5	4	Oussama Sahnoune	Algeria	50.94	Q
6	5	5	Ryan Coetzee	South Africa	51.37	Q
7	4	6	Mehdi Nazim Benbara	Algeria	51.55	Q
8	3	3	Samy Boutouil	Morocco	51.57	Q
9	4	5	Peter Wetzlar	Zimbabwe	51.78	
10	5	6	Steven Aimable	Senegal	51.92	
11	3	7	Phillip Adejumo	Nigeria	52.43	
12	5	7	Ridhwan Mohamed	Kenya	52.94	
13	4	2	Audai Hassouna	Libya	52.96	
14	3	6	El Hadj Adama Niane	Senegal	53.17	
15	5	2	Mathieu Marquet	Mauritius	53.42	
16	4	7	Filipe Gomes	Malawi	54.10	
17	3	1	Daniel Francisco	Angola	54.13	
18	3	2	Merwane El Merini	Morocco	54.19	
19	4	3	Mathieu Bachmann	Seychelles	54.31	
20	5	1	Swaleh Talib	Kenya	54.35	
21	5	8	Daniel Christian	Eritrea	54.46	
22	4	1	Ambala Atuhaire Ogola	Uganda	54.59	
23	4	8	Yellow Yeiyah	Nigeria	54.96	
24	3	8	Kitso Matija	Botswana	55.60	
25	2	4	Ayman Khatoun	Zimbabwe	56.23	
26	2	6	Mawupemon Otogbe	Togo	56.87	
27	2	3	Solomon Dzingai	Botswana	57.56	
28	2	5	Adama Ouedraogo	Burkina Faso	57.87	
29	2	2	Albachir Mouctar	Niger	1:00.02	
30	1	4	Shala Gekabel	Ethiopia	1:03.64	
31	2	7	Ebrima Buaro	The Gambia	1:04.48	
32	1	5	Mamadou Bah	Guinea	1:04.99	
33	2	1	Houssein Gaber Ibrahim	Djibouti	1:05.21	
34	1	3	Yordanos Belachew	Ethiopia	1:13.26	

=== Final ===
The final was started on 21 August at 17:15.

Rank	Lane	Name	Nationality	Time	Notes
1st place, gold medalist(s)	2	Oussama Sahnoune	Algeria	48.97	GR
2nd place, silver medalist(s)	5	Ali Khalafalla	Egypt	49.81	
3rd place, bronze medalist(s)	4	Mohamed Hassan	Egypt	49.85	
4	3	Douglas Erasmus	South Africa	50.31	
5	6	Xander Skinner	Namibia	50.53	
6	7	Ryan Coetzee	South Africa	50.60	
7	8	Samy Boutouil	Morocco	51.29	
8	1	Mehdi Nazim Benbara	Algeria	51.61	
