= Swimming at the 2019 African Games – Women's 1500 metre freestyle =

Women's 1500 metre freestyle at the 2019 African Games
- Venue: Mohammed V Sports Complex – Olympic Pool
- Dates: 21 August (final)
- Competitors: 6 from 4 nations
- Winning time: 17:06.71

Medalists
gold medal	Hania Moro	Egypt
silver medal	Samantha Randle	South Africa
bronze medal	Carla Antonopoulos	South Africa

The Women's 1500 metre freestyle competition of the 2019 African Games was held on 21 August 2019.

== Records ==
Prior to the competition, the existing world and championship records were as follows.

	Name	Nation	Time	Location	Date
World record	Katie Ledecky	United States	15:20.48	Indianapolis	16 May 2018
African record	Wendy Trott	South Africa	16:05.63	Shanghai	25 July 2011
Games record	Roxanne Tammadge	South Africa	17:03.22	Maputo	10 September 2011

== Results ==
=== Final ===
The final was started on 21 August at 17:00.

Rank	Lane	Name	Nationality	Time	Notes
1st place, gold medalist(s)	3	Hania Moro	Egypt	17:06.71	
2nd place, silver medalist(s)	4	Samantha Randle	South Africa	17:11.07	
3rd place, bronze medalist(s)	2	Carla Antonopoulos	South Africa	17:22.15	
4	5	Majda Chebaraka	Algeria	17:27.24	
5	1	Inass Rachidi	Morocco	18:30.85	
6	6	Douaa Eddahbi	Morocco	18:35.79	
