= Swimming at the 2019 African Games – Men's 50 metre butterfly =

Men's 50 metre butterfly at the 2019 African Games
- Venue: Mohammed V Sports Complex – Olympic Pool
- Dates: 22 August (heats and final)
- Competitors: 34 from 14 nations
- Winning time: 23.81

Medalists
gold medal	Abdelrahman Elaraby	Egypt
silver medal	Ali Khalafalla	Egypt
bronze medal	Ryan Coetzee	South Africa

The Men's 50 metre butterfly competition of the 2019 African Games was held on 22 August 2019.

== Records ==
Prior to the competition, the existing world and championship records were as follows.

	Name	Nation	Time	Location	Date
World record	Andriy Govorov	Ukraine	22.27	Rome	1 July 2018
African record	Roland Schoeman	South Africa	22.90	Rome	26 July 2009
Games record	Chad le Clos	South Africa	23.51	Brazzaville	8 September 2015

== Results ==
=== Heats ===
The heats were started on 22 August at 10:55.

Rank	Heat	Lane	Name	Nationality	Time	Notes
1	4	4	Abdelrahman Elaraby	Egypt	24.03	Q
2	5	5	Yusuf Tibazi	Morocco	24.22	Q
3	3	4	Ali Khalafalla	Egypt	24.25	Q
4	4	5	Douglas Erasmus	South Africa	24.26	Q
5	5	4	Ryan Coetzee	South Africa	24.54	Q
6	3	5	Abeiku Jackson	Ghana	24.62	Q
7	4	3	Ralph Goveia	Zambia	24.79	Q
8	5	3	Peter Wetzlar	Zimbabwe	24.87	Q, NR
9	3	6	Phillip Adejumo	Nigeria	25.13	
10	5	2	Yellow Yeiyah	Nigeria	25.24	
11	5	7	Issa Mohamed	Kenya	25.31	
12	5	6	Steven Aimable	Senegal	25.33	NR
13	4	6	Niklas Yeboah	Ghana	25.41	
14	4	2	Daniel Francisco	Angola	25.52	
15	3	3	Souhail Hamouchane	Morocco	25.58	
16	4	7	El Hadji Adama Niane	Senegal	25.63	
17	3	2	Mathieu Bachmann	Seychelles	25.99	
18	5	8	Xander Skinner	Namibia	26.10	
19	3	7	Efrem Ghimai	Eritrea	26.22	
20	3	1	Ridhwan Mohamed	Kenya	26.53	
20	4	1	Filipe Gomes	Malawi	26.53	
22	4	8	Andisiwe Tayali	Zimbabwe	26.83	
23	3	8	Simon Bachmann	Seychelles	26.98	
24	5	1	Adama Ouedraogo	Burkina Faso	27.17	
25	2	4	Belly-Crésus Ganira	Burundi	27.24	
26	2	2	Kumaren Naidu	Zambia	27.75	
27	2	3	Kitso Matija	Botswana	27.77	
28	2	6	Ousmane Touré	Mali	27.88	
29	2	5	Billy-Scott Irakose	Burundi	28.27	
30	2	7	Albachir Mouctar	Niger	28.55	
31	1	5	Shala Gekabel	Ethiopia	28.57	
32	1	3	Dienov Andres Koka	Republic of the Congo	29.50	
33	2	1	Julius Wyse	Sierra Leone	30.01	
34	1	4	Eméric Kpegba	Togo	32.33	

=== Final ===
The final was started on 22 August at 17:00.

Rank	Lane	Name	Nationality	Time	Notes
1st place, gold medalist(s)	4	Abdelrahman Elaraby	Egypt	23.81	
2nd place, silver medalist(s)	3	Ali Khalafalla	Egypt	23.88	
3rd place, bronze medalist(s)	2	Ryan Coetzee	South Africa	24.04	
4	6	Douglas Erasmus	South Africa	24.05	
5	5	Yusuf Tibazi	Morocco	24.15	
6	8	Peter Wetzlar	Zimbabwe	24.46	NR
7	7	Abeiku Jackson	Ghana	24.50	
8	1	Ralph Goveia	Zambia	24.90	
