= Swimming at the 2019 African Games – Women's 800 metre freestyle =

Women's 800 metre freestyle at the 2019 African Games
- Venue: Mohammed V Sports Complex – Olympic Pool
- Dates: 24 August (final)
- Competitors: 6 from 4 nations
- Winning time: 8:54.01

Medalists
gold medal	Hania Moro	Egypt
silver medal	Samantha Randle	South Africa
bronze medal	Majda Chebaraka	Algeria

The Women's 800 metre freestyle competition of the 2019 African Games was held on 24 August 2019.

== Records ==
Prior to the competition, the existing world and championship records were as follows.

	Name	Nation	Time	Location	Date
World record	Katie Ledecky	United States	8:04.79	Rio de Janeiro	12 August 2016
African record	Wendy Trott	South Africa	8:25.71	Rome	14 June 2012
Games record	Kirsty Coventry	Zimbabwe	8:43.89	Algiers	14 July 2007

== Results ==
=== Final ===
The final was started on 24 August.

Rank	Lane	Name	Nationality	Time	Notes
1st place, gold medalist(s)	4	Hania Moro	Egypt	8:54.01	
2nd place, silver medalist(s)	5	Samantha Randle	South Africa	8:55.32	
3rd place, bronze medalist(s)	6	Majda Chebaraka	Algeria	9:07.21	
4	3	Carla Antonopoulos	South Africa	9:07.74	
5	2	Inass Rachidi	Morocco	9:44.39	
6	7	Douaa Eddahbi	Morocco	9:44.62	
