= Swimming at the 2019 African Games – Women's 400 metre freestyle =

Women's 400 metre freestyle at the 2019 African Games
- Venue: Mohammed V Sports Complex – Olympic Pool
- Dates: 23 August (final)
- Competitors: 7 from 4 nations
- Winning time: 4:21.36

Medalists
gold medal	Hania Moro	Egypt
silver medal	Christin Mundell	South Africa
bronze medal	Majda Chebaraka	Algeria

The Women's 400 metre freestyle competition of the 2019 African Games was held on 23 August 2019.

== Records ==
Prior to the competition, the existing world and championship records were as follows.

	Name	Nation	Time	Location	Date
World record	Katie Ledecky	United States	3:56.46	Rio de Janeiro	7 August 2016
African record	Karin Prinsloo	South Africa	4:07.92	Perth	31 January 2014
Games record	Melissa Corfe	South Africa	4:15.53	Algiers	18 July 2007

== Results ==
=== Final ===
The final was held on 23 August.

Rank	Lane	Name	Nationality	Time	Notes
1st place, gold medalist(s)	4	Hania Moro	Egypt	4:21.36	
2nd place, silver medalist(s)	5	Christin Mundell	South Africa	4:22.95	
3rd place, bronze medalist(s)	6	Majda Chebaraka	Algeria	4:24.60	
4	3	Jessica Whelan	South Africa	4:26.20	
5	7	Sarah Soliman	Egypt	4:35.83	
6	2	Lina Khiyara	Morocco	4:40.05	
	1	Inass Rachidi	Morocco	Disqualified	
