= Swimming at the 2019 African Games – Women's 4 × 100 metre medley relay =

Women's 4 × 100 metre medley relay at the 2019 African Games
- Venue: Mohammed V Sports Complex – Olympic Pool
- Dates: 24 August
- Competitors: 20 from 5 nations
- Teams: 5
- Winning time: 4:12.42

Medalists
gold medal	Kerryn Herbst; Kaylene Corbett; Erin Gallagher; Emma Chelius	South Africa
silver medal	Rola Hussein; Sarah Soliman; Farida Osman; Hania Moro	Egypt
bronze medal	Sara El Tahawi; Hamida Rania Nefsi; Amel Melih; Majda Chebaraka	Algeria

The Women's 4 × 100 metre medley relay competition of the 2019 African Games was held on 24 August 2019.

== Records ==
Prior to the competition, the existing world and championship records were as follows.

	Team	Time	Location	Date
World record	United States	3:50.40	Gwangju	28 July 2019
African record	South Africa	4:03.62	Durban	6 April 2008
Games record	South Africa	4:10.90	Algiers	18 July 2007

== Results ==
=== Final ===
The final was started on 24 August.

Rank	Lane	Nation	Swimmers	Time	Notes
1st place, gold medalist(s)	6	South Africa	Kerryn Herbst (1:04.40); Kaylene Corbett (1:10.88); Erin Gallagher (1:00.27); Emma Chelius (56.87)	4:12.42	
2nd place, silver medalist(s)	3	Egypt	Rola Hussein (1:05.96); Sarah Soliman (1:13.53); Farida Osman (1:00.94); Hania Moro (59.64)	4:20.07	
3rd place, bronze medalist(s)	2	Algeria	Sara El Tahawi (1:06.43); Hamida Rania Nefsi (1:13.08); Amel Melih (1:04.43); Majda Chebaraka (58.95)	4:22.89	
	5	Kenya	Sylvia Brunlehner; Rebecca Kamau; Emily Muteti; Maria Brunlehner	Disqualified	
	4	Morocco	Yasmine Dgaimesh; Hiba Laknit; Lina Khiyara; Noura Mana	Disqualified	
