= Swimming at the 2019 African Games – Women's 50 metre freestyle =

Women's 50 metre freestyle at the 2019 African Games
- Venue: Mohammed V Sports Complex – Olympic Pool
- Dates: 21 August (heats and final)
- Competitors: 38 from 27 nations
- Winning time: 24.95

Medalists
gold medal	Erin Gallagher	South Africa
silver medal	Farida Osman	Egypt
bronze medal	Emma Chelius	South Africa

The Women's 50 metre freestyle competition of the 2019 African Games was held on 24 August 2019.

== Records ==
Prior to the competition, the existing world and championship records were as follows:

	Name	Nation	Time	Location	Date
World record	Sarah Sjöström	Sweden	23.67	Budapest	29 July 2017
African record	Farida Osman	Egypt	24.62	Budapest	29 July 2017
Games record	Farida Osman	Egypt	25.12	Brazzaville	10 September 2015

The following new records were set during this competition:

Date	Event	Name	Nation	Time	Record
24 August	Final	Erin Gallagher	South Africa	24.95	GR

== Results ==
=== Heats ===
The heats started on 24 August at 10:30.

Rank	Heat	Lane	Name	Nationality	Time	Notes
1	5	4	Farida Osman	Egypt	25.38	Q
2	4	4	Erin Gallagher	South Africa	25.55	Q
3	3	4	Emma Chelius	South Africa	25.77	Q
4	5	5	Amel Melih	Algeria	26.03	Q
5	4	5	Felicity Passon	Seychelles	26.05	Q, WD
6	4	3	Emily Muteti	Kenya	26.68	Q
7	3	5	Naomi Ruele	Botswana	26.74	Q, WD
8	3	3	Maria Brunlehner	Kenya	26.98	Q, WD
9	5	3	Amina Elsebelgy	Egypt	27.14	Q
10	3	8	Tilka Paljk	Zambia	27.36	Q
11	4	6	Jeanne Boutbien	Senegal	27.51	Q
12	5	6	Noura Mana	Morocco	27.60	
13	5	7	Catarina Sousa	Angola	27.68	NR
14	5	1	Timipame-ere Akiayefa	Nigeria	28.09	
15	4	7	Kiah Borg	Namibia	28.15	
16	4	2	Sophia Diagne	Senegal	28.29	
17	5	2	Nomvulo Mjimba	Zimbabwe	28.45	
18	3	7	Abibat Ogunbanwo	Nigeria	28.59	
19	3	2	Yasmine Dgaimesh	Morocco	28.63	
20	4	1	Robyn Lee	Zimbabwe	29.03	
21	3	6	Rebecca Ssengonzi	Uganda	29.23	
22	3	1	Khema Elizabeth	Seychelles	29.36	
23	5	8	Angelika Ouedraogo	Burkina Faso	29.52	
24	4	8	Caitlin Loo	Botswana	29.63	
25	1	7	Nafissath Radji	Benin	29.86	
26	2	4	Lombe Mwape	Zambia	30.03	
27	2	7	Rahel Gebresilassie	Ethiopia	31.96	
28	2	3	Aya Mpali	Gabon	32.63	
29	2	5	Chloe Sauvourel	Central African Republic	32.65	
30	2	6	Roukaya Mahamane	Niger	32.76	
31	1	4	Berhane Amare	Ethiopia	32.94	
32	2	8	Bellore Sangala	Republic of the Congo	33.17	
33	2	2	Odrina Kaze	Burundi	35.11	
34	1	5	Safia Houssein Barkat	Djibouti	35.64	
35	1	6	Mariama Touré	Guinea	37.67	
36	1	3	Isha Kanu	Sierra Leone	37.80	
37	2	1	Aminata Sangafe	Mali	38.80	
			Maria Ndogng Mangue	Equatorial Guinea	Disqualified	

=== Final ===
The final heat started on 24 August at 17:00.

Rank	Lane	Name	Nationality	Time	Notes
1st place, gold medalist(s)	5	Erin Gallagher	South Africa	24.95	GR
2nd place, silver medalist(s)	4	Farida Osman	Egypt	25.06	
3rd place, bronze medalist(s)	3	Emma Chelius	South Africa	25.25	
4	6	Amel Melih	Algeria	25.86	
5	2	Emily Muteti	Kenya	26.72	
6	7	Amina Elsebelgy	Egypt	26.90	
7	1	Tilka Paljk	Zambia	27.39	
8	8	Jeanne Boutbien	Senegal	27.53	
