= Tennis at the 2019 African Games – Men's doubles =

Men's doubles at the 2019 African Games
- Venue: Cheminots Club
- Dates: 24-29 August
- Competitors: 62 from 22 nations

Medalists
gold medal	Aziz Dougaz; Skander Mansouri	Tunisia
silver medal	Adam Moundir; Lamine Ouahab	Morocco
bronze medal	Akram El Sallaly; Mohamed Safwat	Egypt
bronze medal	Karim-Mohamed Maamoun; Sherif Sabry	Egypt

Men's doubles
- Tennis at the 2019 African Games

Events
Singles	men	women
Doubles	men	women
Team	men	women
- African Games

The men's doubles event at the 2019 African Games was held from 24 to 29 August at the Cheminots Club.

Wisdom Na-Adjrago and George Darko are the defending champion, but they doesn't participate in this year event.

== Medalists ==
Gold	Silver	Bronze
Aziz Dougaz (TUN) and Skander Mansouri	Adam Moundir (MAR) and Lamine Ouahab	Akram El Sallaly (EGY) and Mohamed Safwat
Aziz Dougaz (TUN) and Skander Mansouri	Adam Moundir (MAR) and Lamine Ouahab	Karim-Mohamed Maamoun (EGY) and Sherif Sabry

== Seeds ==
1. Aziz Dougaz (TUN) / Skander Mansouri (TUN) (champion; gold medalist)
2. Benjamin Lock (ZIM) / Courtney John Lock (ZIM) (Quarterfinal)
3. Akram El Sallaly (EGY) / Mohamed Safwat (EGY) (semifinal)
4. Adam Moundir (MAR) / Lamine Ouahab (MAR) (final; silver medalist)
5. Karim-Mohamed Maamoun (EGY) / Sherif Sabry (EGY) (semifinal)
6. Anas Fattar (MAR) / Yassir Kilani (MAR) (Quarterfinal)
7. Ismael Mzai (KEN) / Ibrahim Yego (KEN) (Quarterfinal)
8. Takanyi Garanganga (ZIM) / Mehluli Sibanda (ZIM) (Quarterfinal)

== Draw ==
Key

- Q = Qualifier
- WC = Wild card
- LL = Lucky loser
- Alt = Alternate
- ITF = ITF entry
- PR = Protected ranking
- SR = Special ranking
- SE = Special exempt
- JE = Junior exempt
- JR = Junior Accelerator Programme entrant
- CO = College Accelerator Programme entrant
- NG = Next Gen Accelerator Program entrant
- w/o = Walkover
- r = Retired
- d = Defaulted

=== Finals ===
Semifinals; 28 August
1	Aziz Dougaz (TUN); Skander Mansouri (TUN)	6	6
3	Akram El Sallaly (EGY); Mohamed Safwat (EGY)	1	1
4	Adam Moundir (MAR); Lamine Ouahab (MAR)	6	6
5	Karim-Mohamed Maamoun (EGY); Sherif Sabry (EGY)	3	2

Final; 29 August
1	Aziz Dougaz (TUN); Skander Mansouri (TUN)	6	7
4	Adam Moundir (MAR); Lamine Ouahab (MAR)	4	5

=== Top half ===
First round 25 August
A Klégou (BEN); S Monnou (BEN)	6	6
A Ahmed (ETH); M Sereche (ETH)	2	1
J Acquah (GHA); B Palm (GHA)	w/o
A Bagayoko (MLI); S Diallo (MLI)
S Ayella (UGA); D Oringa (UGA)
6	A Fattar (MAR); Y Kilani (MAR)	w/o
3	A El Sallaly (EGY); M Safwat (EGY)	7^{7}	6
K Cheruiyot (KEN); A Njogu (KEN)	6^{5}	2
A Ikondo (COD); B Bolangi (COD)	6	6
A Bationo (CIV); K Koffi (CIV)	1	4
J Erasmus (NAM); G Van Dyk (NAM)	6^{1}	0
S Emmanuel (NGR); J Ubong (NGR)	7^{7}	6
L Andriamasilalao (MAD); A Ratsimandresy (MAD)	1	3
8	T Garanganga (ZIM); M Sibanda (ZIM)	6	6

Second round 26 August
1	A Dougaz (TUN); S Mansouri (TUN)	6	7
A Klégou (BEN); S Monnou (BEN)	3	5
J Acquah (GHA); B Palm (GHA)	6	2	[5]
6	A Fattar (MAR); Y Kilani (MAR)	4	6	[10]
3	A El Sallaly (EGY); M Safwat (EGY)	6	6
A Ikondo (COD); B Bolangi (COD)	0	1
S Emmanuel (NGR); J Ubong (NGR)	1	3
8	T Garanganga (ZIM); M Sibanda (ZIM)	6	6

Quarterfinals; 27 August
1	A Dougaz (TUN); S Mansouri (TUN)	3	6	[10]
6	A Fattar (MAR); Y Kilani (MAR)	6	1	[6]
3	A El Sallaly (EGY); M Safwat (EGY)	6	6^{5}	[10]
8	T Garanganga (ZIM); M Sibanda (ZIM)	3	7^{7}	[2]

Semifinals; 28 August
1	A Dougaz (TUN); S Mansouri (TUN)	6	6
3	A El Sallaly (EGY); M Safwat (EGY)	1	1

=== Bottom half ===
First round 25 August
7	I Mzai (KEN); I Yego (KEN)	6	2	[10]
H Abban (GHA); I Nortey (GHA)	3	6	[8]
T Holmes (BOT); D Seetso (BOT)	2	6^{5}
N Motlojoa (LES); M Sempe (LES)	6	7^{7}
S Belay (ETH); U Fiseha (ETH)	0	2
B Alipoe-Tchotchodji (TOG); C Alipoe-Tchotchodji (TOG)	6	6
E Coulibaly (CIV); G Ouattara (CIV)	3	3
4	A Moundir (MAR); L Ouahab (MAR)	6	6
5	K-M Maamoun (EGY); S Sabry (EGY)	6	6
H Antchandie (GAB); W Lebendje (GAB)	1	1
W Bushamuka (COD); C Saidi Otupio (COD)	6	6
S El Hafedh (MTN); O Youbawa (MTN)	1	0
A Diallo (GUI); M Makadji (GUI)	3	1
A Bangura (SLE); B Kargbo (SLE)	6	6
E Audu (NGR); T Otuu (NGR)	3	3
2	B Lock (ZIM); CJ Lock (ZIM)	6	6

Second round 26 August
7	I Mzai (KEN); I Yego (KEN)	6	6
N Motlojoa (LES); M Sempe (LES)	3	3
B Alipoe-Tchotchodji (TOG); C Alipoe-Tchotchodji (TOG)	1	1
4	A Moundir (MAR); L Ouahab (MAR)	6	6
5	K-M Maamoun (EGY); S Sabry (EGY)	6	7
W Bushamuka (COD); C Saidi Otupio (COD)	2	5
A Bangura (SLE); B Kargbo (SLE)	1	2
2	B Lock (ZIM); CJ Lock (ZIM)	6	6

Quarterfinals; 27 August
7	I Mzai (KEN); I Yego (KEN)	2	1
4	A Moundir (MAR); L Ouahab (MAR)	6	6
5	K-M Maamoun (EGY); S Sabry (EGY)	7	7^{7}
2	B Lock (ZIM); CJ Lock (ZIM)	5	6^{4}

Semifinals; 28 August
4	A Moundir (MAR); L Ouahab (MAR)	6	6
5	K-M Maamoun (EGY); S Sabry (EGY)	3	2
