= Senegal at the 2019 African Games =

- Flag of Senegal
- IOC code: SEN
- NOC: Comité National Olympique et Sportif Sénégalais

in Rabat, Morocco 19 August 2019 – 31 August 2019
- Competitors: 127 (78 men and 49 women) in 16 sports
- Medals Ranked 22nd: Gold 1 Silver 5 Bronze 16 Total 22

African Games appearances (overview)
- 1965; 1973; 1978; 1987; 1991; 1995; 1999; 2003; 2007; 2011; 2015; 2019; 2023; 2027

Senegal competed at the 2019 African Games held from 19 to 31 August 2019 in Rabat, Morocco. In total, athletes representing Senegal won one gold medal, five silver medals and 16 bronze medals and the country finished in 22nd place in the medal table.

== Medal summary ==
=== Medal table ===
Medal	Name	Sport	Event	Date
Gold	Mbagnick Ndiaye	Judo	Men's +100 kg	18 August
Silver	Anta Sambou	Wrestling	Women's freestyle 68 kg	29 August
Silver	Oulimata Ba Fall; Combe Seck	Canoeing	Women's C-2 500 metres	29 August
Silver	Hassane Ramlaoui	Shooting	Men's skeet	30 August
Silver	Oulimata Ba Fall	Canoeing	Women's C-1 200 metres	30 August
Silver	Oulimata Ba Fall; Combe Seck	Canoeing	Women's C-2 200 metres	30 August
Bronze	Monica Sagna	Judo	Women's +78 kg	18 August
Bronze	Coumba Ndoye	Taekwondo	Women's –53 kg	21 August
Bronze	Moustapha Fall	Taekwondo	Men's –87 kg	21 August
Bronze	Ababacar Sadikh Soumaré	Taekwondo	Men's –80 kg	21 August
Bronze	Moustapha Kama	Taekwondo	Men's –54 kg	22 August
Bronze	Fallou Beye	Karate	Men's Kumite -60kg	26 August
Bronze	Abdou Cisse	Karate	Men's Kumite -84kg	26 August
Bronze	Women's team	Karate	Women's Kumite team	26 August
Bronze	Louis François Mendy	Athletics	Men's 110 metres hurdles	27 August
Bronze	Salimata D Sabaly	Fencing	Women's Individual Épée	27 August
Bronze	Men's team	Football	Men's tournament	29 August
Bronze	Combe Seck	Canoeing	Women's C-1 500 metres	29 August
Bronze	Amaou Diagne; Babacar Gaye; Babacar Keita	Fencing	Men's Team Sabre	29 August
Bronze	Senegal	Fencing	Women's Team Épée	29 August
Bronze	Jean Bernard Diatta	Wrestling	Men's freestyle 74 kg	30 August
Bronze	Senegal	Fencing	Men's Team Épée	30 August

Medals by sport
Sport	1st place, gold medalist(s)	2nd place, silver medalist(s)	3rd place, bronze medalist(s)	Total
Athletics	0	0	1	1
Canoeing	0	3	1	4
Fencing	0	0	4	4
Football	0	0	1	1
Judo	1	0	1	2
Karate	0	0	3	3
Shooting	0	1	0	1
Taekwondo	0	0	4	4
Wrestling	0	1	1	2
Total	1	5	16	22

== Athletics ==
Louis François Mendy won the bronze medal in the men's 110 metres hurdles event, the only medal won by an athlete representing Senegal in athletics.

Henry Bandiaky competed in the men's 100 metres and men's 200 metres. In both events he did not advance to the semifinals.

== Boxing ==
Four athletes represented Senegal in boxing: Marietou Diallo, Mamadou Fall, Mbagnick Ndiaye and Khadija Timera.

== Canoeing ==
Senegal competed in canoeing. Oulimata Ba Fall and Combe Seck were among the canoeists to represent Senegal and they won three silver medals and one bronze medal.

== Equestrian ==
Batj Gaye, Salif Keita, Babacar Ngom and Mohamed Seck represented Senegal in equestrian events.

== Fencing ==
Senegal competed in fencing and, in total, fencers representing Senegal won four bronze medals.

== Football ==
Senegal's national under-20 football team competed at the 2019 African Games. They won the bronze medal in the men's tournament.

== Handball ==
Senegal was scheduled to compete in handball at the 2019 African Games but ultimately did not compete.

== Judo ==
Ten athletes represented Senegal in judo.

Mbagnick Ndiaye won the gold medal in the men's +100 kg event and Monica Sagna won a bronze medal in the women's +78 kg event.

== Karate ==
Senegal competed in karate. Fallou Beye won bronze in the Men's Kumite -60kg event, Abdou Cisse won bronze in the Men's Kumite -84kg event and the women's team won bronze in the Women's Kumite team event.

== Shooting ==
Clement Fakhoury, Hassane Ramlaoui and Hassan Saleh competed in the men's skeet event.

== Swimming ==
Six athletes represented Senegal in swimming.

Men

Athlete	Event	Heat		Final	
Athlete	Event	Time	Rank	Time	Rank
Steven Aimable	50 m freestyle	23.80	13	did not advance	
Steven Aimable	100 m freestyle	51.92 NR	10	did not advance	
Steven Aimable	50 m backstroke	27.71 NR	10	did not advance	
Steven Aimable	50 m butterfly	25.33 NR	12	did not advance	
Steven Aimable	100 m butterfly	54.96	6 Q	55.03	7
Abdoul Niane	50 m breaststroke	29.56	13	did not advance	
El Hadji Adama Niane	50 m freestyle	23.75	11	did not advance	
El Hadji Adama Niane	100 m freestyle	53.17	14	did not advance	
El Hadji Adama Niane	50 m backstroke	39.48	20	did not advance	
El Hadji Adama Niane	50 m butterfly	25.63	16	did not advance	
Adama Thiaw Ndir	50 m breaststroke	31.07	18	did not advance	
Adama Thiaw Ndir	100 m breaststroke	1:07.34	14	did not advance	
Abdoul Niane; Steven Aimable; El Hadji Adama Niane; Adama Thiaw Ndir	4×100 m freestyle relay	—N/a		3:29.30 NR	5
Steven Aimable; Adama Thiaw Ndir; El Hadji Adama Niane; Abdoul Niane	4×100 m medley relay	—N/a		3:57.50 NR	5

Women

Athlete	Event	Heat		Final	
Athlete	Event	Time	Rank	Time	Rank
Jeanne Boutbien	50 m freestyle	27.51 NR	11 QR	27.53	8
Jeanne Boutbien	100 m freestyle	59.19	7 Q	59.35	7
Sophia Diagne	50 m freestyle	28.29	16	did not advance	
Sophia Diagne	50 m backstroke	32.33	16	did not advance	
Sophia Diagne	50 m butterfly	30.22	14	did not advance	

Mixed

Athlete	Event	Heat		Final	
Athlete	Event	Time	Rank	Time	Rank
Abdoul Niane; El Hadji Adama Niane; Sophia Diagne; Jeanne Boutbien	4×100 m freestyle relay	3:46.48 NR	3 Q	3:43.89 NR	4
Sophia Diagne; Abdoul Niane*; Adama Thiaw Ndir; Steven Aimable; Jeanne Boutbien	4×100 m medley relay	4:15.24	4 Q	4:10.17 NR	4

Legend: (*) = Swimmers who participated in the heat only.

== Table tennis ==
Ibrahima Diaw, Mohamed Gueye and Hamidou Sow are scheduled to compete in table tennis.

== Taekwondo ==
Senegal competed in Taekwondo.

Athlete	Event	Round of 32	Round of 16	Quarterfinals	Semifinals	Final	
Athlete	Event	Opposition Result	Opposition Result	Opposition Result	Opposition Result	Opposition Result	Rank
Ngoné Fall	Women's –46 kg	—N/a	Mansour (EGY); W 25–5	Mbubu (COD); L 26–28	did not advance		
Sokhna Diarra Bousso Seck	Women's –49 kg	—N/a	Amarh (GHA); L 8–29	did not advance			

== Triathlon ==
Mamadou Diop finished in 9th place in the men's event.

Hamadel Nestor Ndiaye finished in 15th place in the men's event.

Anta Ndiaye finished in 10th place in the women's event.

Sall Adji Mame Awa finished in 15th place in the women's event.

== Volleyball ==
Senegal's women's national volleyball team competed in the women's volleyball tournament at the 2019 African Games.

== Wrestling ==
Senegal competed in wrestling. In total, wrestlers representing Senegal won one silver medal and one bronze medal and the country finished 7th in the wrestling medal table.
