= Swimming at the 2019 African Games – Men's 400 metre freestyle =

Swimming competition

Men's 400 metre freestyle at the 2019 African Games
- Venue: Mohammed V Sports Complex – Olympic Pool
- Dates: 23 August (final)
- Competitors: 8 from 5 nations
- Winning time: 3:48.94

Medalists
gold medal	Mohamed Agili	Tunisia
silver medal	Marwan Elkamash	Egypt
bronze medal	Ahmed Akram	Egypt

The Men's 400 metre freestyle competition of the 2019 African Games was held on 23 August 2019.

== Records ==
Prior to the competition, the existing world and championship records were as follows.

	Name	Nation	Time	Location	Date
World record	Paul Biedermann	Germany	3:40.07	Rome	26 July 2009
African record	Oussama Mellouli	Tunisia	3:41.11	Rome	26 July 2009
Games record	Ahmed Akram	Egypt	3:48.06	Brazzaville	9 September 2015

== Results ==
=== Final ===
The final was started on 23 August at 17:00.

Rank	Lane	Name	Nationality	Time	Notes
1st place, gold medalist(s)	3	Mohamed Agili	Tunisia	3:48.94	
2nd place, silver medalist(s)	5	Marwan Elkamash	Egypt	3:50.95	
3rd place, bronze medalist(s)	4	Ahmed Akram	Egypt	3:51.81	
4	1	Mohamed Djaballah	Algeria	3:56.02	NR
5	6	Brent Szurdoki	South Africa	3:56.76	
6	7	Roberto Gomes	South Africa	3:58.84	
7	2	Lounis Khendriche	Algeria	4:03.20	
8	8	João Duarte	Angola	4:30.83	
