= Sierra Leone at the 2019 African Games =

- Flag of Sierra Leone
- IOC code: SLE
- NOC: National Olympic Committee of Sierra Leone

in Rabat, Morocco 19 August 2019 – 31 August 2019
- Competitors: 34 (20 men and 14 women) in 9 sports
- Medals: Gold 0 Silver 0 Bronze 0 Total 0

African Games appearances
- 1991; 1995; 1999; 2003; 2007; 2011; 2015; 2019; 2023

Sierra Leone competed at the 2019 African Games held from 19 to 31 August 2019 in Rabat, Morocco.

== Athletics ==
Sierra Leone competed in several events in athletics.

Julius Morie and Alpha Breezy Kamara competed in the men's 100 metres event. Neither of them qualified to compete in the semifinals.

Fatmata Awolo and Elma Sesay competed in the women's 100 metres event. Neither of them qualified to compete in the semifinals.

Maggie Barrie competed in the women's 200 metres and women's 400 metres events. In the 200 metres event she advanced to compete in the final and in the 400 metres event she reached the semifinals.

Maggie Barrie, Elma Sesay, Fatmata Awolo, Mary Thomas Tarawally competed in the women's 4 × 400 metres relay event. They finished in 7th place.

== Boxing ==
John Browne, Deedra Arvella Chestnut, Zainab Keita and Samuel Kamara represented Sierra Leone in boxing.

== Chess ==
Sierra Leone competed in the men's blitz individual and men's rapid individual events. Sierra Leone was also scheduled to compete in the mixed team event but ultimately did not compete in that event.

== Judo ==
Frederick Harris and Christian Bangura were scheduled to compete in judo but did not compete in any events.

== Karate ==
Victor Amara Jr (men's kata individual) and Abubakarr Kamara (men's kumite -60kg) represented Sierra Leone in karate.

== Swimming ==
Joshua Jonathan Julius Wyse and Isha Kanu competed in swimming.

Wyse competed in the men's 50 metre butterfly and men's 50 metre freestyle events. Kanu competed in the women's 50 metre breaststroke and women's 50 metre freestyle events.

== Tennis ==
Bassie Sorie Kargbo competed in the men's singles event. He won his first match against Gideon Van Dyk and in his second match he was eliminated by Aziz Dougaz.

Kargbo and Amadu Bangura also competed in the men's doubles event. They advanced to the second round where they were eliminated by Benjamin Lock and Courtney John Lock (representing Zimbabwe).

Fudia Kargbo competed in the women's singles event. She competed against Barakat Quadre and she did not advance to the next match.

== Volleyball ==
Sierra Leone competed in beach volleyball in both the men's tournament and women's tournament.

Ishmail Bangura and John Sorie Kamara competed in the men's tournament and Gladys Mabinty Fofana and Francess Lansana competed in the women's tournament.

== Wrestling ==
Three athletes represented Sierra Leone in wrestling.

Key:

- VT – Victory by fall.
- PP – Decision by points – the loser with technical points.
- PO – Decision by points – the loser without technical points.
- ST – Great superiority – the loser without technical points and a margin of victory of at least 8 (Greco-Roman) or 10 (freestyle) points.
- SP – Technical superiority – the loser with technical points and a margin of victory of at least 8 (Greco-Roman) or 10 (freestyle) points.
- IN - Victory by injury - the loser is injured before or during a bout.

Men's freestyle

Athlete	Event	Qualification	Quarterfinal	Semifinal	Repechage 1	Final / BM	
Athlete	Event	Opposition Result	Opposition Result	Opposition Result	Opposition Result	Opposition Result	Rank
Mohamed Swaray	−65 kg	Bye	E Djekoundakom (CHA); L 0–6 ^{VT}	did not advance			13
Mohamed Bundu	−97 kg	Bye	A Mbo (COD); L 1–9 ^{VT}	did not advance			9

Men's Greco-Roman

Athlete	Event	Group Stages			
Athlete	Event	Opposition Result	Opposition Result	Opposition Result	Rank
Mohamed Bundu	−97 kg	A Boudjemline (ALG); L 0–10 ^{ST}	N Hassan (EGY); L 0–5 ^{VT}	A Mbo (COD); L 0–8 ^{ST}	4

Women's freestyle

Athlete	Event	Group Stages			
Athlete	Event	Opposition Result	Opposition Result	Opposition Result	Rank
Massah Jalloh	−76 kg	B Onyebuchi (NGR); L 0–8 ^{VT}	A Youin (CIV); L 0–6 ^{VT}	M Ahmed (EGY); L 0–2 ^{VT}	4
