= Swimming at the 2019 African Games – Men's 200 metre freestyle =

Men's 200 metre freestyle at the 2019 African Games
- Venue: Mohammed V Sports Complex – Olympic Pool
- Dates: 22 August (heats and final)
- Competitors: 17 from 14 nations
- Winning time: 1:49.10

Medalists
gold medal	Marwan Elkamash	Egypt
silver medal	Mohamed Agili	Tunisia
bronze medal	Yassin Elshamaa	Egypt

The Men's 200 metre freestyle competition of the 2019 African Games was held on 22 August 2019.

== Records ==
Prior to the competition, the existing world and championship records were as follows.

	Name	Nation	Time	Location	Date
World record	Paul Biedermann	Germany	1:42.00	Rome	28 July 2009
African record	Chad le Clos	South Africa	1:45.20	Rio de Janeiro	8 August 2016
Games record	Devon Brown	South Africa	1:47.77	Brazzaville	6 September 2015

== Results ==
=== Heats ===
The heats were started on 22 August at 10:15.

Rank	Heat	Lane	Name	Nationality	Time	Notes
1	2	4	Mohamed Agili	Tunisia	1:51.63	Q
2	1	4	Yassin Elshamaa	Egypt	1:52.43	Q
3	3	3	Martin Binedell	South Africa	1:53.05	Q
4	3	4	Marwan Elkamash	Egypt	1:53.19	Q
5	2	3	Mohamed Djaballah	Algeria	1:53.62	Q
6	2	5	Igor Mogne	Mozambique	1:54.11	Q
7	3	5	Brent Szurdoki	South Africa	1:54.15	Q
8	1	3	Xander Skinner	Namibia	1:54.41	Q
9	1	5	Audai Hassouna	Libya	1:54.91	
10	3	6	Adil Assouab	Morocco	1:59.46	
11	2	6	Ambala Atuhaire Ogola	Uganda	2:01.19	
12	3	7	Damien Otogbe	Togo	2:09.02	
13	3	2	João Duarte	Angola	2:10.76	
14	1	2	Billy-Scott Irakose	Burundi	2:14.43	
15	2	2	Belly-Crésus Ganira	Burundi	2:16.22	
16	2	7	Solomon Dzingai	Botswana	2:19.05	
17	1	7	Abdelmalik Muktar	Ethiopia	2:44.62	

=== Final ===
The final was started on 22 August at 17:15.

Rank	Lane	Name	Nationality	Time	Notes
1st place, gold medalist(s)	6	Marwan Elkamash	Egypt	1:49.10	
2nd place, silver medalist(s)	4	Mohamed Agili	Tunisia	1:49.22	
3rd place, bronze medalist(s)	5	Yassin Elshamaa	Egypt	1:49.40	
4	3	Martin Binedell	South Africa	1:51.93	
5	1	Brent Szurdoki	South Africa	1:52.83	
6	7	Igor Mogne	Mozambique	1:52.93	
7	2	Mohamed Djaballah	Algeria	1:53.12	
8	8	Xander Skinner	Namibia	1:55.10	
