= Fencing at the 2019 African Games =

African fencing games held in 2019

- Venue: Moulay Rachid National Sports Center – Hall 1
- Location: Salé, Morocco
- Dates: 26–30 August

Fencing at the 2019 African Games was held from 26 to 30 August 2019 in Salé, Morocco.

The event served as a qualifier for the 2020 Summer Olympics in Tokyo, Japan.

== Participating nations ==
- Angola
- Democratic Republic of the Congo
- Egypt
- Ghana
- Ivory Coast
- Libya
- Madagascar
- Mali
- Morocco
- Namibia
- Senegal
- Togo
- Tunisia

== Medal table ==
* Host nation (Morocco)

Rank	Nation	Gold	Silver	Bronze	Total
1	Egypt (EGY)	8	5	6	19
2	Tunisia (TUN)	3	5	2	10
3	Morocco (MAR)*	1	2	4	7
4	Senegal (SEN)	0	0	4	4
5	Togo (TOG)	0	0	2	2
6	Democratic Republic of the Congo (COD)	0	0	1	1
6	Ivory Coast (CIV)	0	0	1	1
6	Libya (LBA)	0	0	1	1
6	Mali (MLI)	0	0	1	1
6	Mauritius (MRI)	0	0	1	1
Totals (10 entries)		12	12	23	47

== Medal summary ==
=== Men ===
Event	Gold	Silver	Bronze
Individual Foil	Alaaeldin Aboelkasem; Egypt	Mohamed Ayoub Ferjani; Tunisia	Mohamed Hamza; Egypt
Individual Foil	Alaaeldin Aboelkasem; Egypt	Mohamed Ayoub Ferjani; Tunisia	Mohamed Samandi; Tunisia
Individual Sabre	Farès Ferjani; Tunisia	Medhat Moataz; Egypt	Mohab Samer; Egypt
Individual Sabre	Farès Ferjani; Tunisia	Medhat Moataz; Egypt	Ahmed Ferjani; Tunisia
Individual Épée	Houssam El Kord; Morocco	Ahmed Saleh; Egypt	Mohammed Yasseen; Egypt
Individual Épée	Houssam El Kord; Morocco	Ahmed Saleh; Egypt	Satya Gunput; Mauritius
Team Foil	Egypt (EGY)	Tunisia (TUN)	Ivory Coast (CIV)
Team Foil	Egypt (EGY)	Tunisia (TUN)	Morocco (MAR)
Team Sabre	Egypt (EGY); Mohamed Abdelaal; Mazen Elarb; Medhat Moatez; Mohab Samer	Tunisia (TUN); Ahmed Ferjani; Farès Ferjani; Hichem Samandi	Mali (MLI); Boubacar Ballo; Gaoussou Coulibaly; Abdoul Kane; Mahamadou Samake
Team Sabre	Egypt (EGY); Mohamed Abdelaal; Mazen Elarb; Medhat Moatez; Mohab Samer	Tunisia (TUN); Ahmed Ferjani; Farès Ferjani; Hichem Samandi	Senegal (SEN); Amaou Diagne; Babacar Gaye; Babacar Keita
Team Épée	Egypt (EGY)	Morocco (MAR)	Libya (LBA)
Team Épée	Egypt (EGY)	Morocco (MAR)	Senegal (SEN)

=== Women ===
Event	Gold	Silver	Bronze
Individual Foil	Inès Boubakri; Tunisia	Noha Hany; Egypt	Yara Elsharkawy; Egypt
Individual Foil	Inès Boubakri; Tunisia	Noha Hany; Egypt	Youssra Zakarani; Morocco
Individual Sabre	Nada Hafez; Egypt	Nour Hassaballah; Egypt	Lina Aly; Egypt
Individual Sabre	Nada Hafez; Egypt	Nour Hassaballah; Egypt	Jeanne Frebault; Democratic Republic of the Congo
Individual Épée	Sarra Besbes; Tunisia	Sara Nounou; Egypt	Nardin Ehab; Egypt
Individual Épée	Sarra Besbes; Tunisia	Sara Nounou; Egypt	Salimata D Sabaly; Senegal
Team Foil	Egypt (EGY)	Tunisia (TUN)	Morocco (MAR)
Team Foil	Egypt (EGY)	Tunisia (TUN)	Togo (TOG)
Team Sabre	Egypt (EGY)	Tunisia (TUN)	Togo (TOG)
Team Épée	Egypt (EGY)	Tunisia (TUN)	Morocco (MAR)
Team Épée	Egypt (EGY)	Tunisia (TUN)	Senegal (SEN)
