= Libya at the 2019 African Games =

- Flag of Libya
- IOC code: LBA
- NOC: Libyan Olympic Committee

in Rabat, Morocco 19 August 2019 – 31 August 2019
- Competitors: 29 (27 men and 2 women) in 13 sports
- Medals Ranked 29th: Gold 0 Silver 2 Bronze 2 Total 4

African Games appearances
- 1978; 1987; 1991; 1995; 1999; 2003; 2007; 2011; 2015; 2019; 2023

Libya competed at the 2019 African Games held from 19 to 31 August 2019 in Rabat, Morocco. In total, athletes representing Libya won two silver medals and two bronze medals and the country finished in 29th place in the medal table, shared with Mali.

== Medal summary ==
=== Medal table ===
Medal	Name	Sport	Event	Date
Silver	Ahsaan Shabi	Weightlifting	Men's 67 kg Clean & Jerk	26 August
Silver	Ahsaan Shabi	Weightlifting	Men's 67 kg	26 August
Bronze	Ahsaan Shabi	Weightlifting	Men's 67 kg Snatch	26 August
Bronze	Libya	Fencing	Men's Team Épée	30 August

Medals by sport
Sport	1st place, gold medalist(s)	2nd place, silver medalist(s)	3rd place, bronze medalist(s)	Total
Fencing	0	0	1	1
Weightlifting	0	2	1	3
Total	0	2	2	4

== Archery ==
Muhanad Almujreesi competed in the men's individual event.

== Athletics ==
Hadel Aboud competed in the women's 100 metres event. She was disqualified after a false start. She also competed in the women's long jump event.

Retag Asaiah was scheduled to compete in the women's discus throw and women's hammer throw events.

Mohamed Mansour finished in 4th place in the men's discus throw event.

== Boxing ==
Two athletes are scheduled to represent Libya in boxing: Ibrahim Ali and Abdlbasit Bin Khayr.

== Chess ==
Abobker Elarabi competed in chess in the men's rapid individual and men's blitz individual events.

== Fencing ==
Abdussalam Abujtela, Abdulmalek Al Ghadi and Khaled Buhdeima are scheduled to compete in fencing.

== Judo ==
Two athletes represented Libya in judo: Mohamed Senusi (Men's -100 kg) and Ali Omar (Men's +100 kg).

Athlete	Event	Round of 32	Round of 16	Quarterfinals	Semifinals	Repechage 1	Final / BM	
Athlete	Event	Opposition Result	Opposition Result	Opposition Result	Opposition Result	Opposition Result	Opposition Result	Rank
Mohamed Senusi	Men's -100 kg	Kosi Samuzu (COD); L	did not advance					
Ali Omar	Men's +100 kg	Sidibe (BUR); L	did not advance					

== Karate ==
Hussin Alturki, Mohamed Dabaa and Gebril Mohamed competed in karate.

== Rowing ==
Two athletes represented Libya in rowing: Alhussein Gambour and Abdussalam Said.

== Swimming ==
Audai Hassouna competed in swimming in the men's 100 metres freestyle and in the men's 200 metres freestyle events.

== Taekwondo ==
Taha Alaswad (men's –87 kg) and Ramadan Elwafi (men's –68 kg) competed in Taekwondo.

== Volleyball ==
Fuad Elmaarug and Mohamed Ikhbayri competed in beach volleyball in the men's tournament.

== Weightlifting ==
Ahmed Abuzriba (men's 89 kg), Abdullah Bousheehah (men's 61 kg) and Ahsaan Shabi (men's 67 kg) competed in weightlifting.

Shabi won the silver medal in his event.
