= Mohamed Lagili =

Tunisian swimmer (born 1997)

Personal information
- Born: 27 May 1997 (age 29)

Sport
- Sport: Swimming
Medal record
Men's swimming
Representing Tunisia
African Games
Gold medal – first place	2019 Rabat	400 m freestyle
Silver medal – second place	2019 Rabat	200 m freestyle
Silver medal – second place	2019 Rabat	800 m freestyle
Silver medal – second place	2019 Rabat	1500 m freestyle
African Championships
Silver medal – second place	2018 Algiers	4×200 m freestyle
Silver medal – second place	2022 Tunis	200 m freestyle
Bronze medal – third place	2018 Algiers	4×100 m freestyle
Bronze medal – third place	2018 Algiers	4×100 m mixed medley
Bronze medal – third place	2022 Tunis	400 m freestyle

Mohamed Lagili (born 27 May 1997) is a Tunisian swimmer. He competed in the men's 200 metre freestyle event at the 2017 World Aquatics Championships. In 2019, he represented Tunisia at the 2019 African Games held in Rabat, Morocco.
