= Tennis at the 2019 African Games – Men's singles =

Men's Tennis singles at the 2019 African Games
- Venue: Cheminots Club
- Dates: 24–29 August
- Competitors: 63 from 23 nations

Medalists
gold medal	Mohamed Safwat	Egypt
silver medal	Karim-Mohamed Maamoun	Egypt
bronze medal	Adam Moundir	Morocco
bronze medal	Aziz Dougaz	Tunisia

Men's singles
- Tennis at the 2019 African Games

Events
Singles	men	women
Doubles	men	women
Team	men	women
- African Games

The men's singles event at the 2019 African Games was held from 24 to 29 August at the Cheminots Club.

Denis Indondo is the defending champion, but he doesn't participate in this year event.

This event is a qualification event to the 2020 Summer Olympics. The winner is qualify to the men's singles event, if he meets the following requirements: His ranking is within the top 300 on the ATP Singles Rankings of 7 June 2021 and doesn't qualify any other athlete from his nation via Direct Acceptance.

Mohamed Safwat of Egypt won the gold medal, defeating his fellow countryman Karim-Mohamed Maamoun in the final, 6–3, 6–4.

== Medalists ==
Gold	Silver	Bronze
Mohamed Safwat (EGY)	Karim-Mohamed Maamoun (EGY)	Adam Moundir (MAR)
Mohamed Safwat (EGY)	Karim-Mohamed Maamoun (EGY)	Aziz Dougaz (TUN)

== Seeds ==
1. Mohamed Safwat (EGY) (champion; gold medalist)
2. Karim-Mohamed Maamoun (EGY) (final; silver medalist)
3. Skander Mansouri (TUN) (Quarterfinal)
4. Aziz Dougaz (TUN) (semifinal)
5. Benjamin Lock (ZIM) (Quarterfinal)
6. Adam Moundir (MAR) (semifinal)
7. Lamine Ouahab (MAR) (Quarterfinal)
8. Takanyi Garanganga (ZIM) (third round)
9. Anas Fattar (MAR) (Quarterfinal)
10. Alexis Klégou (BEN) (first round)
11. Mehluli Sibanda (ZIM) (second round)
12. Yassir Kilani (MAR) (third round)
13. Courtney John Lock (ZIM) (third round)
14. Sherif Sabry (EGY) (third round)
15. Eliakim Coulibaly (CIV) (third round)
16. Sylvester Emmanuel (NGR) (third round)

== Draw ==
Key

- Q = Qualifier
- WC = Wild card
- LL = Lucky loser
- Alt = Alternate
- ITF = ITF entry
- PR = Protected ranking
- SR = Special ranking
- SE = Special exempt
- JE = Junior exempt
- JR = Junior Accelerator Programme entrant
- CO = College Accelerator Programme entrant
- NG = Next Gen Accelerator Program entrant
- w/o = Walkover
- r = Retired
- d = Defaulted

=== Finals ===
Quarterfinals; 27 August
1	Mohamed Safwat (EGY)	7^{7}	6
7	Lamine Ouahab (MAR)	6^{5}	2
4	Aziz Dougaz (TUN)	6	6
5	Benjamin Lock (ZIM)	3	4
6	Adam Moundir (MAR)	5	6	6
3	Skander Mansouri (TUN)	7	4	2
9	Anas Fattar (MAR)	4	2
2	Karim-Mohamed Maamoun (EGY)	6	6

Semifinals; 28 August
1	Mohamed Safwat (EGY)	6	6
4	Aziz Dougaz (TUN)	3	2
6	Adam Moundir (MAR)	3	6	3
2	Karim-Mohamed Maamoun (EGY)	6	4	6

Final; 29 August
1	Mohamed Safwat (EGY)	6	6
2	Karim-Mohamed Maamoun (EGY)	3	4

=== Top half ===
==== Section 1 ====
First round 24 August
E Audu (NGR)	6	6
F Rasendra (MAD)	1	1
M Sempe (LES)	1	1
W Lebendje (GAB)	6	6
S Belay (ETH)	1	0
13	CJ Lock (ZIM)	6	6
10	A Klégou (BEN)	6	4	3
C Saidi Otupio (COD)	1	6	6
A Njogu (KEN)	6	6
B Alipoe-Tchotchodji (TOG)	4	0
S El Hafedh (MTN)	0	0
J Acquah (GHA)	6	6
K Koffi (CIV)	1	0
7	L Ouahab (MAR)	6	6

Second round 25 August
1	M Safwat (EGY)	6	6
E Audu (NGR)	2	1
W Lebendje (GAB)	0	1
13	CJ Lock (ZIM)	6	6
C Saidi Otupio (COD)	1	3
A Njogu (KEN)	6	6
J Acquah (GHA)	2	1
7	L Ouahab (MAR)	6	6

Third round 26 August
1	M Safwat (EGY)	6	6
13	CJ Lock (ZIM)	0	2
A Njogu (KEN)	4	3
7	L Ouahab (MAR)	6	6

Quarterfinals; 27 August
1	M Safwat (EGY)	7^{7}	6
7	L Ouahab (MAR)	6^{5}	2

==== Section 2 ====
First round 24 August
4	A Dougaz (TUN)	6	6
I Mzai (KEN)	4	0
B Kargbo (SLE)	6	7
G Van Dyk (NAM)	2	5
J Ubong (NGR)	6	6
A Bagayoko (MLI)	1	1
H Abban (GHA)	4	2
15	E Coulibaly (CIV)	6	6
12	Y Kilani (MAR)	6	6
D Oringa (UGA)	4	4
A Diallo (GUI)	1	0
A El Sallaly (EGY)	6	6
A Ikondo (COD)	6	6
T Holmes (BOT)	3	2
A Ahmed (ETH)	0	0
5	B Lock (ZIM)	6	6

Second round 25 August
4	A Dougaz (TUN)	6	6
B Kargbo (SLE)	0	0
J Ubong (NGR)	4	0^{r}
15	E Coulibaly (CIV)	6	3
12	Y Kilani (MAR)	6	6
A El Sallaly (EGY)	3	2
A Ikondo (COD)	1	0
5	B Lock (ZIM)	6	6

Third round 26 August
4	A Dougaz (TUN)	7^{7}	6
15	E Coulibaly (CIV)	6^{1}	2
12	Y Kilani (MAR)	3	6	3
5	B Lock (ZIM)	6	0	6

Quarterfinals; 27 August
4	A Dougaz (TUN)	6	6
5	B Lock (ZIM)	3	4

=== Bottom half ===
==== Section 3 ====
First round 24 August
6	A Moundir (MAR)	6	6
D Seetso (BOT)	0	0
L Andriamasilalao (MAD)	6	6
J Erasmus (NAM)	1	3
H Antchandie (GAB)	6	6
M Sereche (ETH)	0	0
N Motlojoa (LES)	1	0
11	M Sibanda (ZIM)	6	6
14	S Sabry (EGY)	6	6
A Bationo (CIV)	3	3
K Cheruiyot (KEN)	6	6
M Makadji (GUI)	0	0
I Nortey (GHA)	6	6
T Otuu (NGR)	3	2
W Bushamuka (COD)	3	0
3	S Mansouri (TUN)	6	6

Second round 25 August
6	A Moundir (MAR)	6	6
L Andriamasilalao (MAD)	1	3
H Antchandie (GAB)	6	3	7
11	M Sibanda (ZIM)	2	6	5
14	S Sabry (EGY)	6	7^{7}
K Cheruiyot (KEN)	4	6^{5}
I Nortey (GHA)	1	4
3	S Mansouri (TUN)	6	6

Third round 26 August
6	A Moundir (MAR)	6	6
H Antchandie (GAB)	3	4
14	S Sabry (EGY)	1	6	3
3	S Mansouri (TUN)	6	4	6

Quarterfinals; 27 August
6	A Moundir (MAR)	5	6	6
3	S Mansouri (TUN)	7	4	2

==== Section 4 ====
First round 24 August
8	T Garanganga (ZIM)	6	6
I Yego (KEN)	4	2
C Alipoe-Tchotchodji (TOG)	6	6
F Boesi (GEQ)	0	0
B Palm (GHA)	7	6
S Ayella (UGA)	5	0
U Fiseha (ETH)	0	3
9	A Fattar (MAR)	6	6
16	S Emmanuel (NGR)	2	6	6
S Diallo (MLI)	6	4	0
G Ouattara (CIV)	7^{8}	6
A Ratsimandresy (MAD)	6^{6}	0
S Monnou (BEN)	6	6
B Bolangi (COD)	4	2
C Van Schalkwyk (NAM)	0	0
2	K-M Maamoun (EGY)	6	6

Second round 25 August
8	T Garanganga (ZIM)	6	6
C Alipoe-Tchotchodji (TOG)	2	1
B Palm (GHA)	1	2
9	A Fattar (MAR)	6	6
16	S Emmanuel (NGR)	6	6
G Ouattara (CIV)	4	4
S Monnou (BEN)	2	1
2	K-M Maamoun (EGY)	6	6

Third round 26 August
8	T Garanganga (ZIM)	7^{14}	3	2
9	A Fattar (MAR)	6^{12}	6	6
16	S Emmanuel (NGR)	0	1
2	K-M Maamoun (EGY)	6	6

Quarterfinals; 27 August
9	A Fattar (MAR)	4	2
2	K-M Maamoun (EGY)	6	6
