= Tennis at the 2019 African Games – Women's singles =

Women's Tennis singles at the 2019 African Games
- Venue: Cheminots Club
- Dates: 24-29 August
- Competitors: 37 from 17 nations

Medalists
gold medal	Mayar Sherif	Egypt
silver medal	Chanel Simmonds	South Africa
bronze medal	Lamis Salama	Egypt
bronze medal	Sandra Samir	Egypt

Women's singles
- Tennis at the 2019 African Games

Events
Singles	men	women
Doubles	men	women
Team	men	women
- African Games

The women's singles event at the 2019 African Games was held from 24 to 29 August at the Cheminots Club.

Sandra Samir is the defending champion, who try defend her title, but she defeated by South African Chanel Simmonds in the semifinal.

This event is a qualification event to the 2020 Summer Olympics. The winner is qualify to the Women's singles event, if she meets the following requirements: Her ranking is within the top 300 on the ATP Singles Rankings of 7 June 2021 and doesn't qualify any other athlete from her nation via Direct Acceptance.

Mayar Sherif of Egypt won the gold medal, defeating South African Chanel Simmonds in the final, 6–3, 6–3.

== Medalists ==
Gold	Silver	Bronze
Mayar Sherif (EGY)	Chanel Simmonds (RSA)	Lamis Salama (EGY)
Mayar Sherif (EGY)	Chanel Simmonds (RSA)	Sandra Samir (EGY)

== Seeds ==
1. Mayar Sherif (EGY) (champion; gold medalist)
2. Chanel Simmonds (RSA) (final; silver medalist)
3. Sandra Samir (EGY) (semifinal)
4. Lamis Salama (EGY) (semifinal)
5. Chiraz Bechri (TUN) (third round)
6. Célestine Avomo (GAB) (Quarterfinal)
7. Angella Okutoyi (KEN) (third round)
8. Judith Muraa (KEN) (third round)
9. Faith Omurunga (KEN) (second round)
10. Salma Ziouti (MAR) (Quarterfinal)
11. Barakat Quadre (NGR) (Quarterfinal)
12. Sara Akid (MAR) (Quarterfinal)
13. Feryel Ben Hassen (TUN) (third round)
14. Allyson Onya (COD) (third round)
15. Alicia Owegi (KEN) (second round)
16. Rania Azziz (MAR) (third round)

== Draw ==
Key

- Q = Qualifier
- WC = Wild card
- LL = Lucky loser
- Alt = Alternate
- ITF = ITF entry
- PR = Protected ranking
- SR = Special ranking
- SE = Special exempt
- JE = Junior exempt
- JR = Junior Accelerator Programme entrant
- CO = College Accelerator Programme entrant
- NG = Next Gen Accelerator Program entrant
- w/o = Walkover
- r = Retired
- d = Defaulted

=== Finals ===
Quarterfinals; 27 August
1	Mayar Sherif (EGY)	6	6
6	Célestine Avomo (GAB)	4	2
4	Lamis Salama (EGY)	7	6
10	Salma Ziouti (MAR)	5	2
12	Sara Akid (MAR)	1	4
3	Sandra Samir (EGY)	6	6
11	Barakat Quadre (NGR)	2	2
2	Chanel Simmonds (RSA)	6	6

Semifinals; 28 August
1	Mayar Sherif (EGY)	6	6
4	Lamis Salama (EGY)	0	0
3	Sandra Samir (EGY)	2	2
2	Chanel Simmonds (RSA)	6	6

Final; 29 August
1	Mayar Sherif (EGY)	6	6
2	Chanel Simmonds (RSA)	3	3

=== Top half ===
==== Section 1 ====
First round 24 August
R Atik (MAR)	6	6
T Iariniaina (MAD)	4	0

Second round 25 August
1	M Sherif (EGY)	6	6
R Atik (MAR)	2	1
MJ Ayingono (GEQ)	0	0
14	A Onya (COD)	6	6
9	F Omurunga (KEN)	2	0
A Osabuohien (NGR)	6	6
M Shumet (ETH)	2	2
6	C Avomo (GAB)	6	6

Third round 26 August
1	M Sherif (EGY)	6	6
14	A Onya (COD)	0	0
A Osabuohien (NGR)	4	6^{6}
6	C Avomo (GAB)	6	7^{8}

Quarterfinals; 27 August
1	M Sherif (EGY)	6	6
6	C Avomo (GAB)	4	2

==== Section 2 ====
First round 24 August
L Theron (NAM)	6	6
B Matsiwe (ZIM)	1	1
MP Biansumba (CIV)	6	6
Z Samuel (ETH)	0	1

Second round 25 August
4	L Salama (EGY)	6	6
L Theron (NAM)	2	1
B Audu (NGR)	1	5
13	F Ben Hassen (TUN)	6	7
10	S Ziouti (MAR)	6	6
M Ibrahim (GHA)	0	0
MP Biansumba (CIV)	2	3
7	A Okutoyi (KEN)	6	6

Third round 26 August
4	L Salama (EGY)	6	7
13	F Ben Hassen (TUN)	1	5
10	S Ziouti (MAR)	6	6
7	A Okutoyi (KEN)	4	3

Quarterfinals; 27 August
4	L Salama (EGY)	7	6
10	S Ziouti (MAR)	5	2

=== Bottom half ===
==== Section 3 ====
First round 24 August
C Monnayoo (BOT)	1	1
E Bagerbaseh (GHA)	6	6

Second round 25 August
5	C Bechri (TUN)	6	6
N Ali (ETH)	0	0
A Aiyegbusi (NGR)	1	1
12	S Akid (MAR)	6	6
15	A Owegi (KEN)	2	1
S Radilofe (MAD)	6	6
E Bagerbaseh (GHA)	0	1
3	S Samir (EGY)	6	6

Third round 26 August
5	C Bechri (TUN)	6^{2}	2
12	S Akid (MAR)	7^{7}	6
S Radilofe (MAD)	0	0
3	S Samir (EGY)	6	6

Quarterfinals; 27 August
12	S Akid (MAR)	1	4
3	S Samir (EGY)	6	6

==== Section 4 ====
First round 24 August
M Nyonda (GAB)	0	1
RS Ahmed (EGY)	6	6

Second round 25 August
8	J Muraa (KEN)	w/o
V Bhunu (ZIM)
F Kargbo (SLE)	0	1
11	B Quadre (NGR)	6	6
16	R Azziz (MAR)	6	6
E Bosmans (COD)	0	0
RS Ahmed (EGY)	1	0
2	C Simmonds (RSA)	6	6

Third round 26 August
8	J Muraa (KEN)	1	1
11	B Quadre (NGR)	6	6
16	R Azziz (MAR)	2	1
2	C Simmonds (RSA)	6	6

Quarterfinals; 27 August
11	B Quadre (NGR)	2	2
2	C Simmonds (RSA)	6	6
