= Sophia Diagne =

Senegalese swimmer

Personal information
- Full name: Sophia Catherine Diagne
- Nationality: Senegalese
- Born: 10 November 1998 (age 27)

Sport
- Sport: Swimming

Sophia Catherine Diagne (born 10 November 1998) is a Senegalese swimmer. She competed in the women's 50 metre backstroke at the 2019 World Aquatics Championships held in Gwangju, South Korea. In 2019, she also represented Senegal at the 2019 African Games held in Rabat, Morocco. She competed in the women's 50 metre backstroke, women's 50 metre butterfly and women's 50 metre freestyle events.
