= Egypt at the 2019 African Games =

- Flag of Egypt
- IOC code: EGY
- NOC: Egyptian Olympic Committee
- Website: www.egyptianolympic.org (in Arabic and English)

in Rabat, Morocco 19 August 2019 – 31 August 2019
- Competitors: 330 (198 men and 132 women) in 25 sports
- Medals Ranked 1st: Gold 102 Silver 98 Bronze 73 Total 273

African Games appearances (overview)
- 1965; 1973; 1978; 1987; 1991; 1995; 1999; 2003; 2007; 2011; 2015; 2019; 2023

Egypt competed at the 2019 African Games held from 19 to 31 August 2019 in Rabat, Morocco. In total, 297 athletes were expected to represent Egypt at the games. This later increased to 330 athletes. Athletes representing the country won 102 gold medals, 98 silver medals and 73 bronze medals and the country finished 1st in the medal table.

The 2019 African Games were the 12th edition of the continental multi-sport event. The games featured over 6,500 athletes from 54 countries competing in 26 sports. Egypt's impressive medal haul included victories in athletics, boxing, weightlifting, taekwondo, and karate, among other sports. The country's performance in the games was particularly notable, as it marked the first time since 1991 that Egypt had finished at the top of the medal table. The success was celebrated throughout the country, with many lauding the achievements of the Egyptian athletes as a source of national pride.

Later five Egyptian athletes (Abderrahmane Al Sayed, Ibrahim Moustafa, Samar Hossein, Sara Ahmed Samir, Farag Salma) were disqualified due to anti-doping violations.

== Medal summary ==
=== Medal table ===
Medal	Name	Sport	Event	Date
Gold	Ali Abdelmouati	Judo	Men's -73 kg	17 August
Gold	Abdelrahman Mohamed	Judo	Men's -81 kg	17 August
Gold	Ramadan Darwish	Judo	Men's -100 kg	18 August
Gold	Ali Hazem	Judo	Men's -90 kg	18 August
Gold	Farida El Askalany; Doaa Elghobashy	Beach volleyball	Women's tournament	21 August
Gold	Ahmed Akram	Swimming	Men's 800 metre freestyle	21 August
Gold	Hania Moro	Swimming	Women's 1500 metre freestyle	21 August
Gold	Farida Osman	Swimming	Women's 200 metre butterfly	21 August
Gold	Marwan Elkamash	Swimming	Men's 200 metre freestyle	22 August
Gold	Abdelrahman Elaraby	Swimming	Men's 50 metre butterfly	22 August
Gold	Hania Moro	Swimming	Women's 200 metre freestyle	22 August
Gold	Farida Osman	Swimming	Women's 50 metre butterfly	22 August
Gold	Hedaya Malak	Taekwondo	Women's –67 kg	22 August
Gold	Maisoun Tolba	Taekwondo	Women's –73 kg	22 August
Gold	Abdelkhalek El-Banna; Dareen Hegazy	Rowing	Mixed relay 2 × 500 metres single sculls	23 August
Gold	Mohamed Samy	Swimming	Men's 50 metre backstroke	23 August
Gold	Hania Moro	Swimming	Women's 400 metre freestyle	23 August
Gold	Farida Osman	Swimming	Women's 100 metre butterfly	23 August
Gold	Marwan El-Amrawy; Ahmed Akram; Marwan Elkamash; Yassin Elshamaa	Swimming	Men's 4 × 200 metre freestyle relay	23 August
Gold	Mahmoud Helmy; Khalid Assar; Omar Assar; Mohamed Elbeialy; Ahmed Saleh	Table tennis	Men's team	23 August
Gold	Yousra Abdel Razek; Farah Abdelaziz; Mariam Alhodaby; Reem Eleraky; Dina Meshref	Table tennis	Women's team	23 August
Gold	Ahmed Saad	Weightlifting	Men's 67 kg snatch	23 August
Gold	Ahmed Saad	Weightlifting	Men's 67 kg clean & jerk	23 August
Gold	Ahmed Saad	Weightlifting	Men's 67 kg total	23 August
Gold	Ragab Abdelhay	Weightlifting	Men's 102 kg snatch	23 August
Gold	Ragab Abdelhay	Weightlifting	Men's 102 kg clean & jerk	23 August
Gold	Ragab Abdelhay	Weightlifting	Men's 102 kg total	23 August
Gold	Ali Khalafalla	Swimming	Men's 50 metre freestyle	24 August
Gold	Ahmed Akram	Swimming	Men's 1500 metre freestyle	24 August
Gold	Hania Moro	Swimming	Women's 800 metre freestyle	24 August
Gold	Basmla ElSalamoney	Triathlon	Women's individual	24 August
Gold	Mohamed Ehab	Weightlifting	Men's 81 kg snatch	24 August
Gold	Mohamed Ehab	Weightlifting	Men's 81 kg clean & jerk	24 August
Gold	Mohamed Ehab	Weightlifting	Men's 81 kg total	24 August
Gold	Karim Abokahla	Weightlifting	Men's 89 kg snatch	24 August
Gold	Karim Abokahla	Weightlifting	Men's 89 kg clean & jerk	24 August
Gold	Karim Abokahla	Weightlifting	Men's 89 kg total	24 August
Gold	Gaber Mohamed	Weightlifting	Men's 109 kg clean & jerk	24 August
Gold	Gaber Mohamed	Weightlifting	Men's 109 kg total	24 August
Gold	Rania Mahmoud	Weightlifting	Women's 71 kg snatch	24 August
Gold	Rania Mahmoud	Weightlifting	Women's 71 kg clean & jerk	24 August
Gold	Rania Mahmoud	Weightlifting	Women's 71 kg total	24 August
Gold	Halima Abbas	Weightlifting	Women's +87 kg snatch	24 August
Gold	Halima Abbas	Weightlifting	Women's +87 kg clean & jerk	24 August
Gold	Halima Abbas	Weightlifting	Women's +87 kg total	24 August
Gold	Ahmed Adly; Bassem Amin; Shrook Wafa; Shahenda Wafa	Chess	Mixed rapid team	25 August
Gold	Omar Assar; Dina Meshref	Table tennis	Mixed team	25 August
Gold	Shehab Ahmed	Athletics	Men's discus throw	26 August
Gold	Alaaeldin Abouelkassem	Fencing	Men's foil individual	26 August
Gold	Malek Salama	Karate	Men's kumite -60 kg	26 August
Gold	Yassmin Hamdy	Karate	Women's kumite -55 kg	26 August
Gold	Ahmed Kamar	Shooting	Men's trap	26 August
Gold	Maggy Ashmawy	Shooting	Women's trap	26 August
Gold	Ahmed Adly	Chess	Men's rapid individual	27 August
Gold	Shrook Wafa	Chess	Women's rapid individual	27 August
Gold	Nada Hafez	Fencing	Women's sabre individual	27 August
Gold	Farah Hussein; Farah Salem; Mandy Mohamed; Nancy Taman; Zeina Ibrahim	Gymnastics	Women's team all-around	27 August
Gold	Ahmed Kamar; Maggy Ashmawy	Shooting	Mixed trap	27 August
Gold	Bassem Amin	Chess	Men's blitz individual	28 August
Gold	Shrook Wafa	Chess	Women's blitz individual	28 August
Gold	Farah Hussein	Gymnastics	Women's individual all-around	28 August
Gold	Haithem Mahmoud	Wrestling	Men's 60 kg Greco-Roman	28 August
Gold	Mohamed Ibrahim El-Sayed	Wrestling	Men's 67 kg Greco-Roman	28 August
Gold	Abdellatif Mohamed	Wrestling	Men's 130 kg Greco-Roman	28 August
Gold	Mostafa El Gamel	Athletics	Men's hammer throw	29 August
Gold	Doha Hany; Hadia Hosny	Badminton	Women's doubles	29 August
Gold	Abdelrahman Oraby	Boxing	Men's light heavyweight	29 August
Gold	Yousry Hafez	Boxing	Men's super heavyweight	29 August
Gold	Mohamed Abdelaal; Medhat Bahgat; Mazen Elarb; Mohab Shawky	Fencing	Men's sabre team	29 August
Gold	Shahd Ahmed; Yara El-Sharkawy; Noha Hany; Noura Mohamed	Fencing	Women's foil team	29 August
Gold	Nardin Ehab; Rodaina Gaafar; Ayah Mahdy; Sara Nounou	Fencing	Women's épée team	29 August
Gold	Ali Zahran	Gymnastics	Men's rings	29 August
Gold	Karim Mohamed	Gymnastics	Men's horizontal bar	29 August
Gold	Nancy Taman	Gymnastics	Women's vault	29 August
Gold	Farah Hussein	Gymnastics	Women's uneven bars	29 August
Gold	Farah Hussein	Gymnastics	Women's balance beam	29 August
Gold	Mandy Mohamed	Gymnastics	Women's floor exercise	29 August
Gold	Dina Meshref	Table tennis	Women's singles	29 August
Gold	Mohamed Safwat	Tennis	Men's singles	29 August
Gold	Mayar Sherif	Tennis	Women's singles	29 August
Gold	Rana Sherif Ahmed; Mayar Sherif	Tennis	Women's doubles	29 August
Gold	Sherif Mohamed	Archery	Men's individual recurve	30 August
Gold	Bahaaeldin Aly; Sherif Mohamed; Youssof Tolba	Archery	Men's team recurve	30 August
Gold	Amal Adam; Mira Elchammaa; Reem Mansour	Archery	Women's team recurve	30 August
Gold	Reem Mansour; Youssof Tolba	Archery	Mixed team recurve	30 August
Gold	Alaaeldin Aboelkasem; Mohamed Ashour; Mohamed Hamza; Youssef Moussa	Fencing	Men's foil team	30 August
Gold	Ahmed Elsayed; Mahmoud Mohsen; Mohamed Saleh; Mohammed Yasseen	Fencing	Men's épée team	30 August
Gold	Logayn Faramawe; Lina Aly; Nada Hafez; Nour Montaser	Fencing	Women's sabre team	30 August
Gold	Hosam Mohamed Merghany	Wrestling	Men's 97 kg freestyle	30 August
Gold	Khaled Omr Abdalla	Wrestling	Men's 125 kg freestyle	30 August
Gold	Lamis Alhussein Abdel Aziz; Sandra Samir; Rana Sherif Ahmed; Mayar Sherif	Tennis	Women's team	31 August
Silver	Gantan Elaskary	Snooker	Women's single	20 August
Silver	Abdelkhalek El-Banna	Rowing	Men's single sculls 1000 metres	21 August
Silver	Dareen Hegazy	Rowing	Women's single sculls 1000 metres	21 August
Silver	Ahmed Abdelaal	Rowing	Men's lightweight single sculls 1000 metres	21 August
Silver	Abdelhamid Abdelrahman	Snooker	Men's single	21 August
Silver	Ali Khalafalla	Swimming	Men's 100 metre freestyle	21 August
Silver	Youssef El-Kamash	Swimming	Men's 50 metre breaststroke	21 August
Silver	Farida Osman	Swimming	Women's 50 metre freestyle	21 August
Silver	Farida Osman	Swimming	Women's 100 metre freestyle	21 August
Silver	Abdelrahman Elaraby; Marwan Elkamash; Ali Khalafalla; Mohamed Samy	Swimming	Men's 4 × 100 metre freestyle relay	21 August
Silver	Amina Elsebelgy; Yasmin Hassan; Hania Moro; Farida Osman	Swimming	Women's 4 × 100 metre freestyle relay	21 August
Silver	Nour Abdelsalam	Taekwondo	Women's –49 kg	21 August
Silver	Salaheldin Khairy	Taekwondo	Men's –87 kg	21 August
Silver	Abdelrahman Darwish	Taekwondo	Men's +87 kg	21 August
Silver	Nayel Nassar; Abdel-Qader Saïd; Mouda Zeyada; Mohamed Talaat	Equestrian	Team jumping	22 August
Silver	Abdelkhalek El-Banna	Rowing	Men's single sculls 500 metres	22 August
Silver	Dareen Hegazy	Rowing	Women's single sculls 500 metres	22 August
Silver	Youssef El-Kamash	Swimming	Men's 100 metre breaststroke	22 August
Silver	Ali Khalafalla	Swimming	Men's 50 metre butterfly	22 August
Silver	Mohamed Samy; Youssef El-Kamash; Farida Osman; Amina Elsebelgy / Rola Hussein; Mohamed Eissawy; Ali Khalafalla	Swimming	4 × 100 metre mixed medley relay	22 August
Silver	Moaz Azat	Taekwondo	Men's –54 kg	22 August
Silver	Marwan Elkamash	Swimming	Men's 400 metre freestyle	23 August
Silver	Youssef El-Kamash	Swimming	Men's 200 metre breaststroke	23 August
Silver	Nour Elgendy; Logaine Abdellatif; Farida Samra; Hania Moro	Swimming	Women's 4 × 200 metre freestyle relay	23 August
Silver	Mohamed Samy; Ali Khalafalla; Amina Elsebelgy; Farida Osman; Abdelrahman Elaraby / Amina Elsebelgy; Ahmed Salem; Farida Samra	Swimming	4 × 100 metre mixed freestyle relay	23 August
Silver	Abdelrahman Wael	Taekwondo	Men's –68 kg	23 August
Silver	Seif Eissa	Taekwondo	Men's –74 kg	23 August
Silver	Radwa Nada	Taekwondo	Women's –57 kg	23 August
Silver	Rewan Refaei	Taekwondo	Women's –62 kg	23 August
Silver	Mohamed Samy	Swimming	Men's 100 metre backstroke	24 August
Silver	Yassin Elshamaa	Swimming	Men's 200 metre individual medley	24 August
Silver	Mohamed Samy; Youssef El-Kamash; Khaled Morad; Ali Khalafalla	Swimming	Men's 4 × 100 metre medley relay	24 August
Silver	Rola Hussein; Sarah Soliman; Farida Osman; Hania Moro	Swimming	Women's 4 × 100 metre medley relay	24 August
Silver	Ahmed Elsayed	Weightlifting	Men's 81 kg clean & jerk	24 August
Silver	Ahmed Elsayed	Weightlifting	Men's 81 kg total	24 August
Silver	Gaber Mohamed	Weightlifting	Men's 109 kg snatch	24 August
Silver	Heba Ahmed	Weightlifting	Women's 49 kg clean & jerk	24 August
Silver	Heba Ahmed	Weightlifting	Women's 49 kg total	24 August
Silver	Basma Ibrahim	Weightlifting	Women's 59 kg snatch	24 August
Silver	Basma Ibrahim	Weightlifting	Women's 59 kg clean & jerk	24 August
Silver	Basma Ibrahim	Weightlifting	Women's 59 kg total	24 August
Silver	Esraa El-Sayed	Weightlifting	Women's 64 kg snatch	24 August
Silver	Esraa El-Sayed	Weightlifting	Women's 64 kg clean & jerk	24 August
Silver	Esraa El-Sayed	Weightlifting	Women's 64 kg total	24 August
Silver	Salma Farag	Weightlifting	Women's 81 kg snatch	24 August
Silver	Salma Farag	Weightlifting	Women's 81 kg total	24 August
Silver	Shaimaa Khalaf	Weightlifting	Women's +87 kg snatch	24 August
Silver	Shaimaa Khalaf	Weightlifting	Women's +87 kg clean & jerk	24 August
Silver	Shaimaa Khalaf	Weightlifting	Women's +87 kg total	24 August
Silver	Basem Alian; Serageldin Elsayed; Mohamed Mohamed; Kareem Moussa	3x3 basketball	Men's tournament	25 August
Silver	Ahmed Saleh; Farah Abdelaziz	Table tennis	Mixed team	25 August
Silver	Medhat Moataz	Fencing	Men's sabre individual	26 August
Silver	Noha Hany	Fencing	Women's foil individual	26 August
Silver	Ahmed Shawky	Karate	Men's kata individual	26 August
Silver	Mohamed Sayed; Ahmed Shawky; Youssef Hammad	Karate	Men's kata team	26 August
Silver	Sarah Sayed	Karate	Women's kata individual	26 August
Silver	Toka Hesham Mohamed; Asmaa Mahmoud; Shahd Sedek	Karate	Women's kata team	26 August
Silver	Abdalla Abdelaziz	Karate	Men's kumite -75 kg	26 August
Silver	Radwa Sayed	Karate	Women's kumite -50 kg	26 August
Silver	Feryal Abdelaziz	Karate	Women's kumite -68 kg	26 August
Silver	Menna Shaaban Okila	Karate	Women's kumite +68 kg	26 August
Silver	Ahmed Saleh; Mohamed Elbeialy	Table tennis	Men's doubles	26 August
Silver	Fatma Elbendary	Athletics	Women's pole vault	27 August
Silver	Mohamed Magdi Hamza	Athletics	Men's shot put	27 August
Silver	Mustafa Mohamed	Athletics	Men's decathlon	27 August
Silver	Bassem Amin	Chess	Men's rapid individual	27 August
Silver	Nour Montaser	Fencing	Women's sabre individual	27 August
Silver	Sara Nounou	Fencing	Women's épée individual	27 August
Silver	Mohamed Moubarak; Mohamed Afify; Zaid Khater; Karim Mohamed; Ali Zahran	Gymnastics	Men's team all-around	27 August
Silver	Ahmed Adly	Chess	Men's blitz individual	28 August
Silver	Shahenda Wafa	Chess	Women's blitz individual	28 August
Silver	Ahmed Saleh	Fencing	Men's épée individual	28 August
Silver	Farah Salem	Gymnastics	Women's individual all-around	28 August
Silver	Mohamed Zahab Khalil	Wrestling	Men's 77 kg Greco-Roman	28 August
Silver	Noureldin Hassan	Wrestling	Men's 97 kg Greco-Roman	28 August
Silver	Alaa El Ashry	Athletics	Men's hammer throw	29 August
Silver	Adham Hatem Elgamal; Doha Hany	Badminton	Mixed doubles	29 August
Silver	Ali Ahmed; Momen Mahran; Ahmed Elbedwihy; Mahmoud Awad	Canoeing	Men's K-4 500 metres	29 August
Silver	Samaa Ahmed; Farah Mohamed; Habiba Ahmed; Rawan Abouarram	Canoeing	Women's K-4 500 metres	29 August
Silver	Zaid Khater	Gymnastics	Men's parallel bars	29 August
Silver	Farah Salem	Gymnastics	Women's vault	29 August
Silver	Zeina Sharaf	Gymnastics	Women's uneven bars	29 August
Silver	Mandy Mohamed	Gymnastics	Women's balance beam	29 August
Silver	Nancy Taman	Gymnastics	Women's floor exercise	29 August
Silver	Abd Aziz Ahab; Abd Elfatah Ali; Abdelrahman Taha; Ahmed Rady; Abdelrahman Mohamed; Kassem Ahmed; Khaled Walid; Omar Dahroug / Omar El-Wakil; Omar Khaled; Mohab Said; Mohsen Ramadan; Ramadan Shady; Saif Hany; Seif El-Deraa; Shehab Ahmed	Handball	Men's tournament	29 August
Silver	Karim-Mohamed Maamoun	Tennis	Men's singles	29 August
Silver	Lamis Alhussein Abdel Aziz; Sandra Samir	Tennis	Women's doubles	29 August
Silver	Eman Guda Ebrahim	Wrestling	Women's 57 kg freestyle	29 August
Silver	Bassant Hemida	Athletics	Women's 200 metres	30 August
Silver	Momen Mahran; Ali Ahmed	Canoeing	Men's K-2 200 metres	30 August
Silver	Farah Mohamed; Samaa Ahmed	Canoeing	Women's K-2 200 metres	30 August
Silver	Amira Aboushokka	Shooting	Women's skeet	30 August
Silver	Samy Moustafa	Wrestling	Men's 74 kg freestyle	30 August
Silver	Akram El Sallaly; Karim-Mohamed Maamoun; Sherif Sabry; Sherif Sabry	Tennis	Men's team	31 August
Bronze	Mohamed Abdelmawgoud	Judo	Men's -66 kg	17 August
Bronze	Abdalla Osman	Judo	Men's -81 kg	17 August
Bronze	Lamiaa Alzenan	Judo	Women's -57 kg	17 August
Bronze	Kariman Shafik	Judo	Women's +78 kg	18 August
Bronze	Maryam Mahmoud	Rowing	Women's lightweight single sculls 1000 metres	21 August
Bronze	Mohamed Samy	Swimming	Men's 100 metre freestyle	21 August
Bronze	Marwan Elkamash	Swimming	Men's 800 metre freestyle	21 August
Bronze	Yassin Elshamaa	Swimming	Men's 200 metre backstroke	21 August
Bronze	Ahmed Salem	Swimming	Men's 200 metre butterfly	21 August
Bronze	Mohamed Kota	Rowing	Men's lightweight single sculls 500 metres	22 August
Bronze	Maryam Mahmoud	Rowing	Women's lightweight single sculls 500 metres	22 August
Bronze	Yassin Elshamaa	Swimming	Men's 200 metre freestyle	22 August
Bronze	Ahmed Salem	Swimming	Men's 400 metre individual medley	22 August
Bronze	Sarah Soliman	Swimming	Women's 100 metre breaststroke	22 August
Bronze	Mennatullah Abdalaal	Taekwondo	Women's +73 kg	22 August
Bronze	Ahmed Akram	Swimming	Men's 400 metre freestyle	23 August
Bronze	Rawan Eldamaty	Swimming	Women's 200 metre breaststroke	23 August
Bronze	Mohamed Alakrady; Yara Sharafeldin	Snooker	Mixed doubles	24 August
Bronze	Marwan El-Amrawy	Swimming	Men's 1500 metre freestyle	24 August
Bronze	Mohamed Abdelaziz	Weightlifting	Men's 109 kg clean & jerk	24 August
Bronze	Neama Said	Weightlifting	Women's 64 kg snatch	24 August
Bronze	Neama Said	Weightlifting	Women's 64 kg clean & jerk	24 August
Bronze	Neama Said	Weightlifting	Women's 64 kg total	24 August
Bronze	Salma Farag	Weightlifting	Women's 81 kg clean & jerk	24 August
Bronze	Abdelrahman Abdelhakim; Adham Hatem Elgamal; Mohamed Mostafa Kamel; Ahmed Salah; Nour Ahmed Youssri; Jana Ashraf; Doha Hany; Hadia Hosny	Badminton	Team	25 August
Bronze	Mohamed Elbeialy; Reem Eleraky	Table tennis	Mixed team	25 August
Bronze	Basmla ElSalamoney; Rehab Hussein; Mohamed Khalil; Mohamed Shehata	Triathlon	Mixed relay	25 August
Bronze	Mohamed Hamza	Fencing	Men's foil individual	26 August
Bronze	Mohab Samer	Fencing	Men's sabre individual	26 August
Bronze	Yara El-Sharkawy	Fencing	Women's foil individual	26 August
Bronze	Aly Ismail	Karate	Men's kumite -67 kg	26 August
Bronze	Taha Mahmoud	Karate	Men's kumite +84 kg	26 August
Bronze	Abdalla Abdelaziz; Aly Ismail; Ali El-Sawy; Mohamed Ahmed Ramadan; Youssef Badawy; Hanafy Mamdouh; Taha Mahmoud	Karate	Men's kumite team	26 August
Bronze	Giana Farouk	Karate	Women's kumite -61 kg	26 August
Bronze	Farah Abdelaziz; Yousra Abdel Razek	Table tennis	Women's doubles	26 August
Bronze	Bassant Hemida	Athletics	Women's 100 metres	27 August
Bronze	Dina Eltabaa	Athletics	Women's pole vault	27 August
Bronze	Mostafa Amr Hassan	Athletics	Men's shot put	27 August
Bronze	Lina Mohamed	Fencing	Women's sabre individual	27 August
Bronze	Nardin Ehab	Fencing	Women's épée individual	27 August
Bronze	Ahmed Elbedwihy; Amr Abouzeid	Canoeing	Men's K-2 1000 metres	28 August
Bronze	Mohammed Yasseen	Fencing	Men's épée individual	28 August
Bronze	Mohamed Moubarak	Gymnastics	Men's individual all-around	28 August
Bronze	Mohamed Metwally	Wrestling	Men's 87 kg Greco-Roman	28 August
Bronze	Islam Mohamed	Athletics	Men's hammer throw	29 August
Bronze	Abdelrahman Abdelhakim; Mohamed Mostafa Kamel	Badminton	Men's doubles	29 August
Bronze	Adham Hatem Elgamal; Ahmed Salah	Badminton	Men's doubles	29 August
Bronze	Doha Hany	Badminton	Women's singles	29 August
Bronze	Ahmed Abdelmoneim	Boxing	Men's middleweight	29 August
Bronze	Youssef Moussa	Boxing	Men's heavyweight	29 August
Bronze	Samaa Ahmed	Canoeing	Women's K-1 500 metres	29 August
Bronze	Farah Mohamed; Habiba Ahmed	Canoeing	Women's K-2 500 metres	29 August
Bronze	Mohamed Moubarak	Gymnastics	Men's rings	29 August
Bronze	Mohamed Moubarak	Gymnastics	Men's vault	29 August
Bronze	Omar Assar	Table tennis	Men's singles	29 August
Bronze	Farah Abdelaziz	Table tennis	Women's singles	29 August
Bronze	Karim-Mohamed Maamoun; Sherif Sabry	Tennis	Men's doubles	29 August
Bronze	Akram El Sallaly; Mohamed Safwat	Tennis	Men's doubles	29 August
Bronze	Lamis Alhussein Abdel Aziz	Tennis	Women's singles	29 August
Bronze	Sandra Samir	Tennis	Women's singles	29 August
Bronze	Samar Amer	Wrestling	Women's 68 kg freestyle	29 August
Bronze	Mona Ahmed	Wrestling	Women's 76 kg freestyle	29 August
Bronze	Youssof Tolba	Archery	Men's individual recurve	30 August
Bronze	Amal Adam	Archery	Women's individual recurve	30 August
Bronze	Ali Ahmed	Canoeing	Men's K-1 200 metres	30 August
Bronze	Samaa Ahmed	Canoeing	Women's K-1 200 metres	30 August
Bronze	Sarkis Martayan	Shooting	Men's skeet	30 August
Bronze	Gamal Mohamed	Wrestling	Men's 57 kg freestyle	30 August
Bronze	Amr Reda Hussen	Wrestling	Men's 65 kg freestyle	30 August
Bronze	Khaled El-Moatamadawi	Wrestling	Men's 86 kg freestyle	30 August
Bronze	Egypt	Volleyball	Men's tournament	31 August

Medals by sport
Sport	1st place, gold medalist(s)	2nd place, silver medalist(s)	3rd place, bronze medalist(s)	Total
3x3 basketball	0	1	0	1
Archery	4	0	2	6
Athletics	2	5	4	11
Badminton	1	1	4	6
Boxing	2	0	2	4
Canoeing	0	4	5	9
Chess	5	3	0	8
Equestrian	0	1	0	1
Fencing	8	5	6	19
Gymnastics	8	7	3	18
Handball	0	1	0	1
Judo	4	0	4	8
Karate	2	8	4	14
Rowing	1	5	3	9
Shooting	3	1	2	6
Snooker	0	2	1	3
Swimming	14	17	10	41
Table tennis	4	2	4	10
Taekwondo	2	8	1	11
Tennis	4	3	4	11
Triathlon	1	0	1	2
Volleyball	1	0	1	2
Weightlifting	23	16	4	43
Wrestling	5	4	7	16
Total	94	94	72	260

Medals by date
Day	Date	1st place, gold medalist(s)	2nd place, silver medalist(s)	3rd place, bronze medalist(s)	Total
1	16 August	0	0	0	0
2	17 August	2	0	3	5
3	18 August	2	0	1	3
4	19 August	0	0	0	0
5	20 August	1	1	0	2
6	21 August	3	11	6	20
7	22 August	6	7	6	19
8	23 August	7	7	2	16
9	24 August	4	7	1	12
10	25 August	2	4	3	9
11	26 August	10	12	7	29
12	27 August	4	15	10	29
13	28 August	18	10	5	33
14	29 August	20	13	19	56
15	30 August	22	10	9	41
16	31 August	1	1	1	3
Total		102	98	73	273

Medals by gender
Gender	1st place, gold medalist(s)	2nd place, silver medalist(s)	3rd place, bronze medalist(s)	Total
Male	54	47	39	140
Female	43	46	29	118
Mixed	5	5	5	15
Total	102	98	73	273

== 3x3 basketball ==
The Egyptian men's team won the silver medal in the 3x3 basketball at the 2019 African Games, losing to Madagascar in the final. They were represented by Basem Alian Serageldin Elsayed Mohamed Mohamed and Kareem Moussa.

The women's team did not make it out of the preliminary round.

== Archery ==
Egypt successfully competed in archery at the 2019 African games, winning 4 gold and 2 bronze medals.

== Athletics ==
Egypt competed in athletics.

== Badminton ==
Egypt competed in badminton with 8 players (4 men and 4 women).

In total badminton players representing Egypt won one gold medal, one silver medal and four bronze medals.

== Boxing ==
In total boxers representing Egypt won two gold medals and two bronze medals. The country finished in 4th place in the boxing medal table.

== Equestrian ==
Egypt competed in equestrian events. Athletes representing Egypt won the silver medal in the team jumping event.

== Fencing ==
Egypt competed in fencing. In total athletes representing Egypt in fencing won eight gold medals, five silver medals and six bronze medals.

== Handball ==
Egypt competed in the men's tournament and the team won the silver medal.

== Judo ==
Mohamed Abdelmawgoud, Nouran Adam and Lamiaa Alzenan were among the athletes to represent Egypt in judo.

== Karate ==
Egypt competed in karate. Giana Farouk, Feryal Abdelaziz and Menna Shaaban Okila were among the athletes to compete. In total athletes representing Egypt in karate won two gold medals, eight silver medals and four bronze medals and the country finished in 2nd place in the karate medal table.

== Rowing ==
In total, rowers representing Egypt won one gold medal, five silver medals and three bronze medals.

== Shooting ==
Egypt competed in shooting. In total sport shooters representing Egypt won three gold medals, one silver medal and two bronze medals.

== Snooker ==
On 20 August, Gantan Elaskary beat fellow Egyptian Yara Sharafeldin. Later that same day, Sharafeldin would lose to against Morocco's Youssra Matine 2-1. Elaskary would go on to earn the country a silver medal.

Abdelrahman Abdelhamid and Mohamed Alakrady are scheduled to compete for the men.

== Swimming ==
Swimmers representing Egypt won 14 gold medals, 17 silver medals and 10 bronze medals and the country finished in 2nd place in the swimming medal table.

== Table tennis ==
Omar Assar and Dina Meshref, both three-time champions and represented Egypt at the 2012 Summer Olympics represented their country again. Assar leads the continental rankings for men's table tennis while Meshref leads for the women.

Assar won a bronze medal in the men's singles event and he also won the gold medal in the men's team event together with Ahmed Saleh and Khalid Assar. Saleh and Mohamed Elbeialy won the silver medal in the men's doubles event.

== Taekwondo ==
In total, athletes representing Egypt in Taekwondo won two gold medals, eight silver medals and one bronze medal and the country finished in 3rd place in the Taekwondo medal table.

== Tennis ==
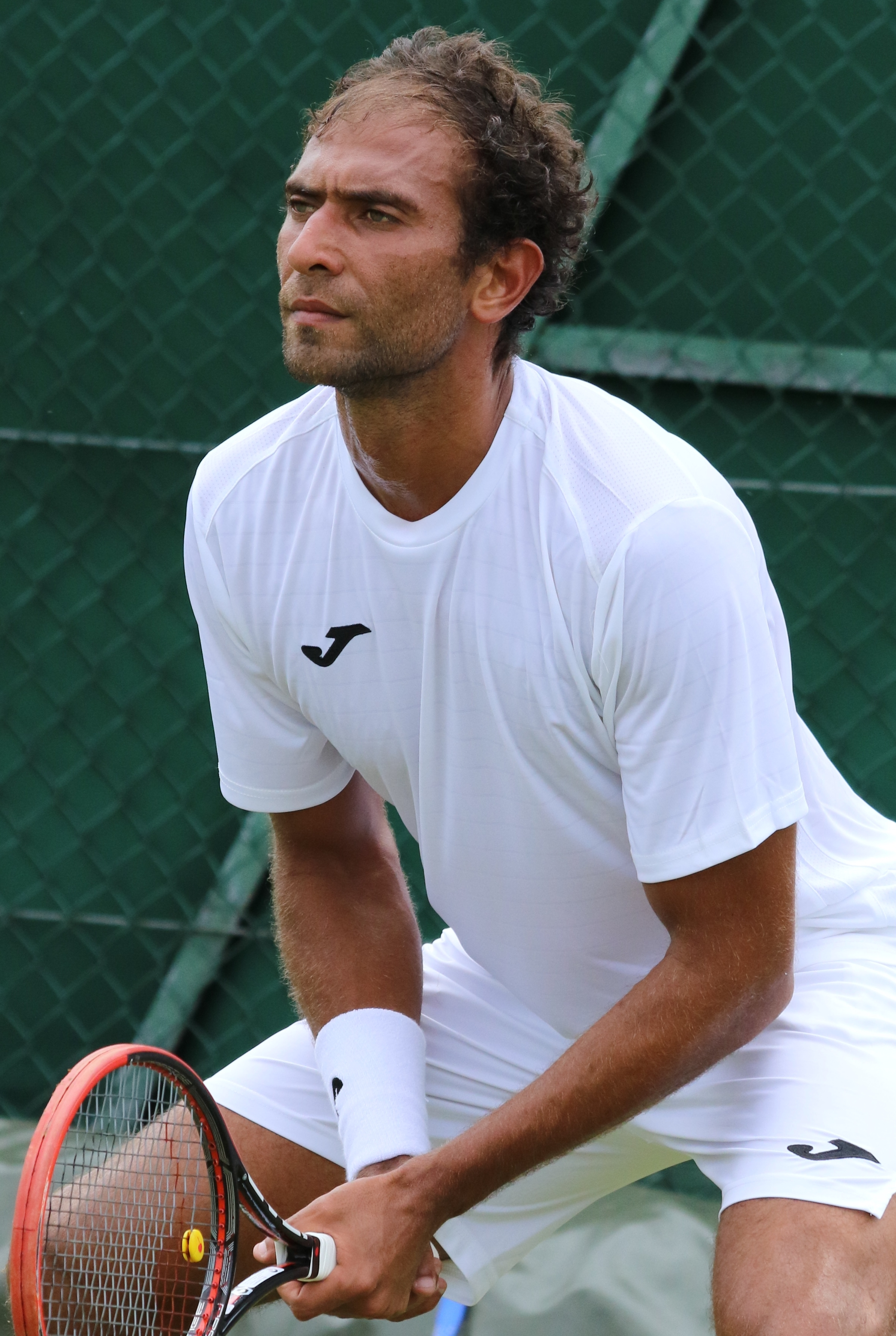
Mohamed Safwat (2016)

Mohamed Safwat won the gold medal in the men's singles event and Karim-Mohamed Maamoun won the silver medal in that event.

Mayar Sherif won the gold medal in the women's singles event. Both Lamis Alhussein Abdel Aziz and Sandra Samir won the bronze medals in the same event.

In the men's doubles even two teams won the bronze medals: Akram El Sallaly and Mohamed Safwat as well as Karim-Mohamed Maamoun and Sherif Sabry.

== Triathlon ==
Basmla ElSalamoney, Rehab Hussein, Mohamed Khalil and Mohamed Shehata competed in triathlon.

ElSalamoney won the gold medal in the women's event. The country also won the bronze medal in the mixed relay event.

== Volleyball ==
On 5 June, Egypt's men team qualified for the African Games after winning a match against Kenya. The men's team has previously won the in five separate games prior and is expected to perform well again in 2019.

On 20 August, Egypt's Beach volleyball women's team (Farida Elaskalany and Doaa Elghobashy) beat Kenya in the finals to win the country its fifth gold medal.

== Weightlifting ==
Egypt is in contention for the gold medal along with Tunisia and Nigeria. Mohamed Ihab, 2016 olympic bronze medalist and the countries most decorated, will be trying to earn a top spot in preparation for the 2020 Tokyo Olympic Games.

Later five Egyptian athletes (Abderrahmane Al Sayed, Ibrahim Moustafa, Samar Hossein, Sara Ahmed Samir, Farag Salma) were disqualified due to anti-doping violations.

== Wrestling ==
Wrestlers representing Egypt won five gold medals, four silver medals and seven bronze medals and the country finished in 2nd place in the wrestling medal table.
