= Uganda at the 2019 African Games =

- Flag of Uganda
- IOC code: UGA
- NOC: Uganda Olympic Committee

in Rabat, Morocco 19 August 2019 – 31 August 2019
- Competitors: 78 (38 men and 40 women) in 12 sports
- Medals Ranked 28th: Gold 0 Silver 2 Bronze 8 Total 10

African Games appearances (overview)
- 1965; 1973; 1978; 1987; 1991; 1995; 1999; 2003; 2007; 2011; 2015; 2019; 2023

Uganda competed at the 2019 African Games held from 19 to 31 August 2019 in Rabat, Morocco. Initially 77 athletes were scheduled to represent Uganda. This later rose to 78 athletes. Athletes representing Uganda won two silver medals and eight bronze medals and the country finished in 28th place in the medal table.

== Medal summary ==
=== Medal table ===
Medal	Name	Sport	Event	Date
Silver	Isaac Masembe	Boxing	Men's featherweight (57 kg)	29 August
Silver	David Semmuju	Boxing	Men's middleweight (75 kg)	29 August
Bronze	Halimah Nakaayi	Athletics	Women's 800 metres	27 August
Bronze	Harold Wanyama	Chess	Rapid Men Individual	27 August
Bronze	Gladys Mbabazi; Aisha Nakiyemba	Badminton	Women's doubles	28 August
Bronze	Hellen Bakale	Boxing	Women's middleweight (75kg)	28 August
Bronze	Zubairi Kubo	Weightlifting	Men's 96 kg Snatch	29 August
Bronze	Zubairi Kubo	Weightlifting	Men's 96 kg Clean & Jerk	29 August
Bronze	Zubairi Kubo	Weightlifting	Men's 96 kg	29 August
Bronze	Stella Wonruku; Nasiba Nabirye; Emily Nanziri; Leni Shida	Athletics	Women's 4 × 400 metres relay	30 August

Medals by sport
Sport	1st place, gold medalist(s)	2nd place, silver medalist(s)	3rd place, bronze medalist(s)	Total
Athletics	0	0	2	2
Badminton	0	0	1	1
Boxing	0	2	1	3
Chess	0	0	1	1
Weightlifting	0	0	3	3
Total	0	2	8	10

== 3x3 basketball ==
Uganda competed in 3x3 basketball. The women's team reached the quarterfinals in the women's tournament.

== Athletics ==
Uganda competed in athletics.

Jacent Nyamahunge competed in the women's 100 metres event. She finished in 13th place in the semifinals. She also competed in the women's 200 metres event where she finished in 15th place in the semifinals. Emily Nanziri also competed in the women's 200 metres event; she finished in 30th place in the heats and she did not advance.

Leni Shida competed in the women's 400 metres event. She finished in 6th place in the final.

Halimah Nakaayi won the bronze medal in the women's 800 metres event.

Esther Chebet finished in 5th place in the women's 1500 metres event.

Sarah Chelangat and Stella Chesang competed in the women's 5000 metres event and they finished in 4th and 7th place respectively. Chesang was also scheduled to compete in the women's 10,000 metres event but she did not start. Rachael Zena Chebet did compete in that event and she finished in 7th place.

In the women's 4 × 400 metres relay the bronze medal was won by Stella Wonruku, Nasiba Nabirye, Emily Nanziri and Leni Shida.

One athlete represented Uganda in the women's half marathon: Linet Toroitich Chebet. She finished in 9th place.

Two athletes represented Uganda in the women's javelin throw event: Josephine Joyce Lalam and Lucy Aber. They finished in 4th and 9th place respectively.

== Badminton ==
Uganda competed in badminton. Six players (three men and three women) represented Uganda in this discipline: Brian Kasirye, Devis Senono, Daniel Mihigo, Aisha Nakiyemba, Gladys Mbabazi and Mable Namakoye

Gladys Mbabazi and Aisha Nakiyemba won the bronze medal in the women's doubles event.

== Boxing ==
Uganda competed in boxing. Six men and two women were scheduled to represent Uganda in boxing: Shadir Musa Bwogi, Champion Busingye, Isaac Masembe, Joshua Tukamuhebwa, David Kavuma Ssemujju, Solomon Geko, Hellen Baleke and Jalia Nalia.

In total, two silver medals and one bronze medal were won in boxing.

== Chess ==
Uganda competed in chess. Two chess players were scheduled to compete: Arthur Ssegwanyi and Harold Wanyama. Wanyama won the country a bronze medal during the Men's rapid individual event.

== Cycling ==
Uganda competed in cycling. No cyclists won a medal.

== Handball ==
Uganda women's national handball team competed in the women's tournament and they reached the quarterfinals where they were eliminated by the Angola women's team.

== Swimming ==
Two athletes represented Uganda in swimming.

Men

Athlete	Event	Heat		Final	
Athlete	Event	Time	Rank	Time	Rank
Ambala Atuhaire	50 m freestyle	25.02	27	did not advance	
Ambala Atuhaire	100 m freestyle	54.59	22	did not advance	
Ambala Atuhaire	200 m freestyle	2:01.19 NR	11	did not advance	
Ambala Atuhaire	100 m backstroke	1:02.90 NR	13	did not advance	
Ambala Atuhaire	100 m butterfly	59.16 NR	23	did not advance	

Women

Athlete	Event	Heat		Final	
Athlete	Event	Time	Rank	Time	Rank
Rebecca Ssengonzi	50 m freestyle	29.23	21	did not advance	
Rebecca Ssengonzi	50 m butterfly	29.49 NR	11	did not advance	
Rebecca Ssengonzi	100 m butterfly	1:05.16 NR	9	did not advance	
Rebecca Ssengonzi	200 m butterfly	2:34.24 NR	7 Q	Withdrawn	

== Table tennis ==
Amina Lukaaya, Eddy Omongole, Rita Nakhumitsa and Ludia Magandlen Natunga competed in table tennis.

== Tennis ==
Uganda entered two tennis players into the African Games.

Men

Athlete	Event	Round of 64	Round of 32	Round of 16	Quarterfinals	Semifinals	Final / BM	
Athlete	Event	Opposition Score	Opposition Score	Opposition Score	Opposition Score	Opposition Score	Opposition Score	Rank
David Oringa	Men's singles	Y Kilani (MAR); L 4–6, 4–6	did not advance					
Simon Ayella	Men's singles	B Palm (GHA); L 5–7, 0–6	did not advance					
Simon Ayella; David Oringa	Men's doubles	—N/a	A Fattar / Y Kilani (MAR); L w/o	did not advance				

== Weightlifting ==
Uganda competed in weightlifting. Four athletes were scheduled to compete: Davis Niyoyita, Julius Ssekitoleko, Hakim Musoke Ssempereza and Zubairi Kubo.

Zubairi Kubo won the bronze medals in all three men's 96kg events.

== See also ==
- Uganda at the African Games
