= Gabon at the 2019 African Games =

- Flag of Gabon
- IOC code: GAB
- NOC: Comité Olympique Gabonais

in Rabat, Morocco 19 August 2019 – 31 August 2019
- Competitors: 28 (19 men and 9 women) in 8 sports
- Medals Ranked 20th: Gold 2 Silver 0 Bronze 4 Total 6

African Games appearances
- 1965; 1973; 1978; 1987; 1991; 1995; 1999; 2003; 2007; 2011; 2015; 2019; 2023

Gabon competed at the 2019 African Games held from 19 to 31 August 2019 in Rabat, Morocco. In total, athletes representing Gabon won two gold medals and four bronze medals and the country finished 20th in the medal table.

== Medal summary ==
=== Medal table ===
Medal	Name	Sport	Event	Date
Gold	Karene Agono	Judo	Women's -70 kg	18 August
Gold	Sarah Myriam Mazouz	Judo	Women's -78 kg	18 August
Bronze	Luc Manongho	Judo	Men's -100 kg	18 August
Bronze	Anthony Obame	Taekwondo	Men's +87 kg	21 August
Bronze	Urgence Mouega	Taekwondo	Women's -67 kg	22 August
Bronze	Nguema Edang Marie	Karate	Men's -75 kg	26 August

Medals by sport
Sport	1st place, gold medalist(s)	2nd place, silver medalist(s)	3rd place, bronze medalist(s)	Total
Judo	2	0	1	3
Karate	0	0	1	1
Taekwondo	0	0	2	2
Total	2	0	4	6

Medals by date
Day	Date	1st place, gold medalist(s)	2nd place, silver medalist(s)	3rd place, bronze medalist(s)	Total
3	18 August	2	0	1	3
5	21 August	0	0	1	1
6	22 August	0	0	1	1
10	26 August	0	0	1	1
Total		2	0	4	6

== Athletics ==
Two athletes represented Gabon in athletics.

Guy Maganga competed in the men's 100 metres and men's 200 metres events. In the men's 100 metres event he did not qualify in the heats and in the men's 200 metres event he finished in 4th place in the final.

Pierrick Moulin competed in the women's 100 metres and women's 200 metres events. For both events, she competed in the heats and did not advance to the semifinals.

== Boxing ==
Two athletes competed in boxing: Junior Mikamou and Franck Mombey.

Mikamou competed in the men's flyweight (52kg) event and Mombey competed in the men's featherweight (57kg) event. Neither of them won a medal.

== Judo ==
Seven athletes represented Gabon in judo: Karene Agono, Philomene Dialli, Aboubakre Gotalowia, Junior Kouamba, Harnold Koussou, Luc Manongho and Sarah Myriam Mazouz.

== Karate ==
Ulrich Ndong (men's Kumite -84kg), Nguema Edang Marie (men's Kumite -75kg), David Obissa (men's Kumite -60kg) and Brolin Youla (men's Kumite -67kg) competed in karate.

Marie won a bronze medal in his event.

== Swimming ==
Two swimmers represented Gabon in swimming.

Adam Mpali competed in the men's 50 metre breaststroke and in the men's 50 metre freestyle events. In both events he did not advance to compete in the final.

Aya Mpali competed in the women's 50 metre freestyle and the women's 50 metre butterfly events. In both events she did not advance to compete in the final.

== Table tennis ==
Andy Bringaud and Tresor Ndong competed in table tennis in the men's singles and men's doubles events.

== Taekwondo ==
In total, five athletes represented Gabon in Taekwondo.

Anthony Obame competed at the 2019 African Games. He won the bronze medal in the men's +87 kg event.

Urgence Mouega won the bronze medal in the Women's -67 kg event.

Leila Bamizock competed in the women's –46 kg event, Amar Moussa competed in the men's –68 kg event and Hermen Doupassou competed in the men's –74 kg event.

== Tennis ==
Herve Antchandie, Wilfrid Lebendje, Celestine Avomo and Maria Nyonda competed in tennis.

Antchandie and Lebendje competed in the men's singles event. Together they also competed in the men's doubles event.

Avomo and Nyonda competed in the women's singles event. Together they also competed in the women's doubles event.
