= Athletics at the 2019 African Games – Men's hammer throw =

The men's hammer throw event at the 2019 African Games was held on 29 August in Rabat.

== Results ==
Rank	Name	Nationality	#1	#2	#3	#4	#5	#6	Result	Notes
1st place, gold medalist(s)	Mostafa El Gamel	Egypt	69.71	69.36	70.14	72.50	70.25	x	72.50	
2nd place, silver medalist(s)	Alaa El Ashry	Egypt	70.12	71.20	71.15	x	71.22	72.04	72.04	
3rd place, bronze medalist(s)	Eslam Moussad Seria	Egypt	70.24	x	70.41	x	70.73	71.36	71.36	
4	Saad Ouahdi	Morocco	61.78	65.42	65.33	62.54	x	x	65.42	
5	Dominic Ondigi Abunda	Kenya	57.83	53.26	57.45	x	58.49	61.31	61.31	
6	Walid Araba	Morocco	58.37	59.66	x	58.38	x	x	59.66	
7	Nicolas Li Yun Fong	Mauritius	x	57.31	59.30	x	56.89	56.25	59.30	
