= Zimbabwe at the 2019 African Games =

- Flag of Zimbabwe
- IOC code: ZIM
- NOC: Zimbabwe Olympic Committee

in Rabat, Morocco 19 August 2019 – 31 August 2019
- Competitors: 67 (41 men and 26 women) in 12 sports
- Flag bearer: Benjamin Lock
- Medals Ranked 31st: Gold 0 Silver 1 Bronze 3 Total 4

African Games appearances (overview)
- 1987; 1991; 1995; 1999; 2003; 2007; 2011; 2015; 2019; 2023

Zimbabwe competed at the 2019 African Games held from 19 to 31 August 2019 in Rabat, Morocco. Zimbabwe competed in 12 sports. In total, athletes representing the country won one silver medal and three bronze medals and the country finished in 31st place in the medal table, shared with Republic of the Congo.

== Medal summary ==
=== Medal table ===
Medal	Name	Sport	Event	Date
Silver	Laurelle Brown	Triathlon	Women's event	24 August
Bronze	Robyn Lee	Swimming	Women's 200 metre backstroke	21 August
Bronze	Andie Kuipers	Triathlon	Women's event	24 August
Bronze	Rodwell Makoto; Emarald Takudzwa Mushore; Linda Dalitso Shaba; Colletah Wakuruwarewa	Chess	Mixed team event	25 August

Medals by sport
Sport	1st place, gold medalist(s)	2nd place, silver medalist(s)	3rd place, bronze medalist(s)	Total
Chess	0	0	1	1
Swimming	0	0	1	1
Triathlon	0	1	1	2
Total	0	1	3	4

== Archery ==
Rebecca Minnaar and Humayoon Poonja competed in archery.

Poonja competed in the men's individual recurve event and Minnaar competed in the women's individual recurve event. Both competed in the mixed team recurve event as well.

== Athletics ==
Dickson Kamungeremu and Ngoni Makusha competed in the men's 100 metres event. Both were eliminated in the semifinals.

Ngoni Makusha, Tatenda Tsumba and Kundai Maguranyanga competed in the men's 200 metres event. Makusha and Tsumba were both eliminated in the semifinals.

Faith Dube competed in the women's 200 metres event. She did not advance to the semifinals.

== Chess ==
Rodwell Makoto, Emarald Takudzwa Mushore, Linda Dalitso Shaba and Colletah Wakuruwarewa competed in chess. They won the bronze medal in the rapid mixed team event.

== Equestrian ==
Zimbabwe competed in both the individual jumping event and the team jumping event.

== Judo ==
Seven athletes represented Zimbabwe in judo: Lazarus Arufandika, Janine Vimbai Kayaya, Benjamin Mashayi, Majaji Tapiwa Seth Keith Musariri, Moses Mutende, Sydney Alex Mutero and Christi-Rose Maria Pretorius.

== Swimming ==
Five swimmers represented Zimbabwe in swimming.

Robyn Lee won the bronze medal in the women's 200 metre backstroke event.

Men

Athlete	Event	Heat		Final	
Athlete	Event	Time	Rank	Time	Rank
Ayman Khatoun	50 m freestyle	25.39	30	did not advance	
Ayman Khatoun	100 m freestyle	56.23	25	did not advance	
Ayman Khatoun	50 m backstroke	29.54	17	did not advance	
Ayman Khatoun	100 m backstroke	1:03.57	15	did not advance	
Andisiwe Tayali	50 m backstroke	29.29	15	did not advance	
Andisiwe Tayali	100 m backstroke	1:03.50	14	did not advance	
Andisiwe Tayali	50 m butterfly	26.83	22	did not advance	
Andisiwe Tayali	100 m butterfly	58.91	19	did not advance	
Andisiwe Tayali	200 m medley	2:30.92	12	did not advance	
Peter Wetzlar	50 m freestyle	23.19	7 Q	23.28	8
Peter Wetzlar	100 m freestyle	51.78	9	did not advance	
Peter Wetzlar	50 m butterfly	24.87	8 Q	24.46	6
Peter Wetzlar	100 m butterfly	55.88	12	did not advance	

Women

Athlete	Event	Heat		Final	
Athlete	Event	Time	Rank	Time	Rank
Robyn Lee	50 m freestyle	29.03	20	did not advance	
Robyn Lee	100 m freestyle	1:00.99	11	did not advance	
Robyn Lee	200 m freestyle	2:11.34	7 Q	2:10.16	7
Robyn Lee	50 m backstroke	31.00	9	did not advance	
Robyn Lee	100 m backstroke	1:06.95	5 Q	1:05.50	5
Robyn Lee	200 m backstroke	—N/a		2:22.50	3rd place, bronze medalist(s)
Robyn Lee	50 m butterfly	29.37	10	did not advance	
Robyn Lee	100 m butterfly	1:06.71	11	did not advance	
Nomvulo Mjimba	50 m freestyle	28.45	17	did not advance	
Nomvulo Mjimba	100 m freestyle	1:01.69	13	did not advance	
Nomvulo Mjimba	50 m breaststroke	37.03	9 QR	37.03	8
Nomvulo Mjimba	50 m butterfly	29.91	13	did not advance	
Nomvulo Mjimba	100 m butterfly	1:08.45	12	did not advance	

Mixed

Athlete	Event	Heat		Final	
Athlete	Event	Time	Rank	Time	Rank
Robyn Lee; Nomvulo Mjimba; Ayman Khatoun; Peter Wetzlar	4×100 m freestyle relay	3:58.07	8 Q	Withdrawn	
Robyn Lee; Peter Wetzlar; Ayman Khatoun*; Andisiwe Tayali; Nomvulo Mjimba	4×100 m medley relay	4:23.65	8 Q	4:19.85	8

Legend: (*) = Swimmers who participated in the heat only.

== Taekwondo ==
Three athletes represented Zimbabwe: Spencer Kondo (men's –68 kg), Lazarus Kuzivakwashe Maringehosi (men's –80 kg) and Kudzai Chimombe (men's –87 kg) competed in Taekwondo.

== Tennis ==
Valeria Shamiso Bhunu, Beverly Nyasha Matsiwe, Takanyi Garanganga, Benjamin Lentaigne Lock, Courtney John Ingram Lock and Mehluli Don Ayanda Sibanda competed in tennis.

Garanganga, Sibanda, Lock and Lock competed in the men's singles event.

Garanganga and Sibanda as well as Lock and Lock competed in the men's doubles event.

Garanganga, Sibanda, Lock and Lock also competed in the men's team event.

Bhunu and Matsiwe competed in the women's singles event.

== Triathlon ==
Matthew Denslow, Jordyn Jacobs, Andie Kuipers and Laurelle Brown competed in triathlon events.

Kuipers won the bronze medal in the women's event with a time of 1:08:57. Brown won the silver medal in the women's event with a time of 1:07:52.

In the men's event Denslow finished 11th with a time of 1:08:08 and Jacobs finished 14th with a time of 1:09:03.

== Volleyball ==
Nyengeterai Danai Guyo and Progress O Gasa represented Zimbabwe in beach volleyball in the women's tournament. They finished in 13th place.
