= Michael McGlynn (swimmer) =

South African swimmer

Personal information
- Nationality: South Africa
- Born: 1 February 2000 (age 25)

Sport
- Sport: Swimming
- Event: Marathon swimming

Michael McGlynn (born 1 February 2000) is a South African marathon swimmer. He competed in the 2020 Summer Olympics.
