= Athletics at the 2019 African Games – Men's discus throw =

The men's discus throw event at the 2019 African Games was held on 26 August in Rabat.

== Results ==
Rank	Name	Nationality	#1	#2	#3	#4	#5	#6	Result	Notes
1st place, gold medalist(s)	Shehab Mohamed Abdalaziz	Egypt	51.05	57.41	59.29	x	x	x	59.29	
2nd place, silver medalist(s)	Dotun Ogundeji	Nigeria	54.15	51.33	52.10	x	55.28	57.82	57.82	
3rd place, bronze medalist(s)	Elbachir Mbarki	Morocco	x	x	48.29	56.92	x	56.07	56.92	
4	Mohamed Wadah Mansour	Libya	56.67	56.58	56.31	x	55.22	55.03	56.67	
5	Christopher Jonathan Sophie	Mauritius	53.67	x	55.88	x	54.60	x	55.88	NR
6	Ryan Williams	Namibia	x	51.65	50.59	x	47.45	53.01	53.01	
7	Aly Abdelmagied	Egypt	x	46.72	47.21	44.40	x	49.81	49.81	
8	Akram Sassi	Tunisia	45.52	49.63	47.68	x	x	46.62	49.63	
9	Mamush Taye	Ethiopia	42.76	46.04	46.46				46.46	
10	Sie Fahige Kambou	Burkina Faso	x	45.01	46.33				46.33	
