= Ivory Coast at the 2019 African Games =

- Flag of Ivory Coast
- IOC code: CIV
- NOC: Comité National Olympique de Côte d'Ivoire

in Rabat, Morocco 19 August 2019 – 31 August 2019
- Competitors: 69 (44 men and 25 women) in 10 sports
- Medals Ranked 12th: Gold 5 Silver 5 Bronze 8 Total 18

African Games appearances
- 1965; 1973; 1978; 1987; 1991; 1995; 1999; 2003; 2007; 2011; 2015; 2019; 2023

Ivory Coast competed at the 2019 African Games held from 19 to 31 August 2019 in Rabat, Morocco. In total, athletes representing Ivory Coast won five gold medals, five silver medals and eight bronze medals and the country finished in 12th place in the medal table.

== Medal summary ==
=== Medal table ===
Medal	Name	Sport	Event	Date
Gold	Cheick Sallah Cissé	Taekwondo	Men's –80 kg	21 August
Gold	Seydou Gbané	Taekwondo	Men's –87 kg	21 August
Gold	Bouma Ferimata Coulibaly	Taekwondo	Women's –49 kg	21 August
Gold	Marie-Josée Ta Lou	Athletics	Women's 100 metres	27 August
Gold	Esmei Anne Marcelle Diombo	Archery	Women's individual	30 August
Silver	Issa Diakite	Taekwondo	Men's –58 kg	22 August
Silver	Marie Frédérique Ekpitini	Taekwondo	Women's –67 kg	22 August
Silver	Arthur Cissé	Athletics	Men's 100 metres	27 August
Silver	Amy Youin	Wrestling	Women's freestyle 76 kg	29 August
Silver	Esmei Anne Marcelle Diombo; Fatou Gbane; Ekpobi Anne-marie Eleonord Yedagne	Archery	Women's team	30 August
Bronze	Christ Seri	Taekwondo	Men's –63 kg	22 August
Bronze	Aminata Charlene Traore	Taekwondo	Women's +73 kg	22 August
Bronze	Aaron Kobenan	Taekwondo	Men's –68 kg	23 August
Bronze	Banassa Diomandé	Taekwondo	Women's –57 kg	23 August
Bronze	Koumba Nanah-Hélène Ibo	Taekwondo	Women's –62 kg	23 August
Bronze	N'de Caroline Yapi	Wrestling	Women's freestyle 50 kg	29 August
Bronze	Men's team	Fencing	Men's Team Foil	30 August
Bronze	Marie-Josée Ta Lou	Athletics	Women's 200 metres	30 August

Medals by sport
Sport	1st place, gold medalist(s)	2nd place, silver medalist(s)	3rd place, bronze medalist(s)	Total
Archery	1	1	0	2
Athletics	1	1	1	3
Fencing	0	0	1	1
Taekwondo	3	2	5	10
Wrestling	0	1	1	2
Total	5	5	8	18

== Archery ==
Six athletes represented Ivory Coast in archery. In total, two medals were won.

Esmei Anne Marcelle Diombo won the gold medal in the women's individual recurve event.

Diombo, Fatou Gbane and Ekpobi Anne-marie Eleonord Yedagne also won the silver medal in the women's team event.

== Athletics ==
Ivory Coast competed in several events in athletics.

Marie-Josée Ta Lou won the gold medal in the women's 100 metres event and Arthur Cissé won the silver medal in the men's 100 metres event.

Marie-Josée Ta Lou also won the bronze medal in the women's 200 metres event.

== Canoeing ==
Amian Valentin Amian and Noutai Jean Vignon competed in canoeing. Amian competed in the men's K-1 200 metres and men's K-1 1000 metres events and Vignon competed in the men's C-1 200 metres and men's C-1 1000 metres events.

== Chess ==
Foua Aroll Junior, Franklin Kouya Tyeoulou Bernadin, Madeleine Lorng Yowel and Marie Yavo Tchetche represented Ivory Coast in chess.

== Fencing ==
Ivory Coast competed in fencing.

Fencers representing Ivory Coast won a bronze medal in the men's team foil event.

== Judo ==
Seven athletes represented Ivory Coast in judo: Daouda Junior Dabone, Maïmouna Kenza Diarrassouba, Salimata Fofana, Bamadou Ouattara, Abdalah Sorogo and Nandjo Yoann Wilfried Yapi.

== Rowing ==
Enrico Semon Bouehi, Riccardo Monti Bouehi and Kouadio Franck N'Dri were scheduled to compete; only Riccardo Monti Bouehi and Kouadio Franck N'Dri competed in their events.

== Taekwondo ==
Cheick Sallah Cissé and Ruth Gbagbi were scheduled to compete in taekwondo at the 2019 African Games. Cheick Sallah Cissé previously won gold at the 2015 African Games.

In total athletes representing Ivory Coast in Taekwondo won three gold medals, two silver medals and five bronze medals.

== Tennis ==
Abdoulaziz Bationo, Eliakim Coulibaly, Kouadio Guillaume Koffi, Gueninle Abdoul Karim Ouattara and Marie Perla Biansumbra competed in tennis.

Bationo, Coulibaly, Koffi and Ouattara competed in the men's singles event.

Bationo and Koffi also competed in the men's doubles event.

Perla Biansumbra competed in the women's singles event.

== Wrestling ==
Ivory Coast competed in wrestling.

Eight athletes competed in wrestling: Abasse Abdoulaye Aladji, Nagoma Celine Bakayoko, Guy Alain Lago, Ulrich Elyse Manouan, Christ Emmanuel N'dri, Adama Tangara, N'de Caroline Yapi and Amy Youin.
