= Mali at the 2019 African Games =

- Flag of Mali
- IOC code: MLI
- NOC: Comité National Olympique et Sportif du Mali

in Rabat, Morocco 19 August 2019 – 31 August 2019
- Competitors: 98 (59 men and 39 women) in 11 sports
- Medals Ranked 29th: Gold 0 Silver 2 Bronze 2 Total 4

African Games appearances
- 1965; 1973; 1978; 1987–1991; 1995; 1999; 2003; 2007; 2011; 2015; 2019; 2023

Mali competed at the 2019 African Games held from 19 to 31 August 2019 in Rabat, Morocco. In total, athletes representing Mali won two silver medals and two bronze medals and the country finished in 29th place in the medal table, shared with Libya.

== Medal summary ==
=== Medal table ===
Medal	Name	Sport	Event	Date
Silver	Gnere Dembele; Assetou Diakite; Aissata Maiga; Djeneba N'Diaye	3x3 basketball	Women's tournament	25 August
Silver	Marine Fatoumata Colerte Camara	Boxing	Women's -57 kg	29 August
Bronze	Seydou Fofana	Taekwondo	Men's -74 kg	23 August
Bronze	Boubacar Ballo; Gaoussou Coulibaly; Abdoul Kane; Mahamadou Samake	Fencing	Men's Sabre Team	29 August

Medals by sport
Sport	1st place, gold medalist(s)	2nd place, silver medalist(s)	3rd place, bronze medalist(s)	Total
3x3 basketball	0	1	0	1
Boxing	0	1	0	1
Fencing	0	0	1	1
Taekwondo	0	0	1	1
Total	0	2	2	4

== 3x3 basketball ==
Gnere Dembele, Assetou Diakite, Aissata Maiga and Djeneba N'Diaye competed in 3x3 basketball and won the silver medal in the women's tournament.

== Athletics ==
Mali competed in athletics.

Issa Sangare competed in the men's 100 metres event. He did not qualify to compete in the semifinals.

Mustapha Traoré competed in the men's 200 metres event. He did not qualify to advance to the semifinals.

Koumba Sidibe competed in the women's 200 metres event. She did not qualify to advance to the semifinals.

Djakaridia Bamba competed in the men's 400 metres event. He did not qualify to advance to the semifinals.

Kadia Dembele competed in the women's 400 metres event. She did not qualify to advance to the semifinals.

== Boxing ==
Four athletes were scheduled to compete in boxing: Marine Fatoumata Colerte Camara, Zakaria Diarra, Daouda Sidibe and Ibrahim Soumare. Marine Fatoumata Colerte Camara won the bronze medal in the women's featherweight (-57 kg) event.

== Chess ==
Abdoulaye Coulibaly, Tenin Nato Diakite, Clarice Kone and Bakary Traore competed in chess.

== Fencing ==
Boubacar Ballo, Gaoussou Coulibaly, Keletigui Julien Diabate, Abdoul Kafar Kane, Mahamadou Samake and Souleymane Sanogo are scheduled to compete in fencing.

== Football ==
Mali's national under-20 football team and Mali's women's national under-20 football team competed at the 2019 African Games.

In the men's tournament the team finished in 4th place and in the women's tournament the team did not advance to compete in the semi-finals.

== Judo ==
Five athletes represented Mali in judo: Youssouf Diallo, Djeneba Konetio, Kante Lamine, Kadidiatou Maiga and Karounga Soumano.

== Karate ==
Awa Sacko, Amadou Diallo, Modibo Sacko, Souleymane Sinayoko and Mamadou Ouattara competed in karate.

== Swimming ==
Four athletes represented Mali in swimming.

Men

Athlete	Event	Heat		Final	
Athlete	Event	Time	Rank	Time	Rank
Sebastien Kouma	50 m breaststroke	28.82	7 Q	28.96	8
Sebastien Kouma	100 m breaststroke	1:04.30	9	did not advance	
Ousmane Touré	50 m buttrerfly	27.88	28	did not advance	
Ousmane Touré	100 m butterfly	1:02.67	26	did not advance	

Women

Athlete	Event	Heat		Final	
Athlete	Event	Time	Rank	Time	Rank
Aichata Konate	50 m breaststroke	47.41	15	did not advance	
Aminata Sangafe	50 m freestyle	38.80	37	did not advance	
Aminata Sangafe	50 m breaststroke	48.13	16	did not advance	

== Taekwondo ==
Mali competed in Taekwondo. Seydou Fofana won a bronze medal in the Men's -74 kg event.

== Tennis ==
Abdoulaye Bagayoko and Seydou Diallo competed in the men's singles event.
