= Hania Moro =

Egyptian swimmer (born 1996)

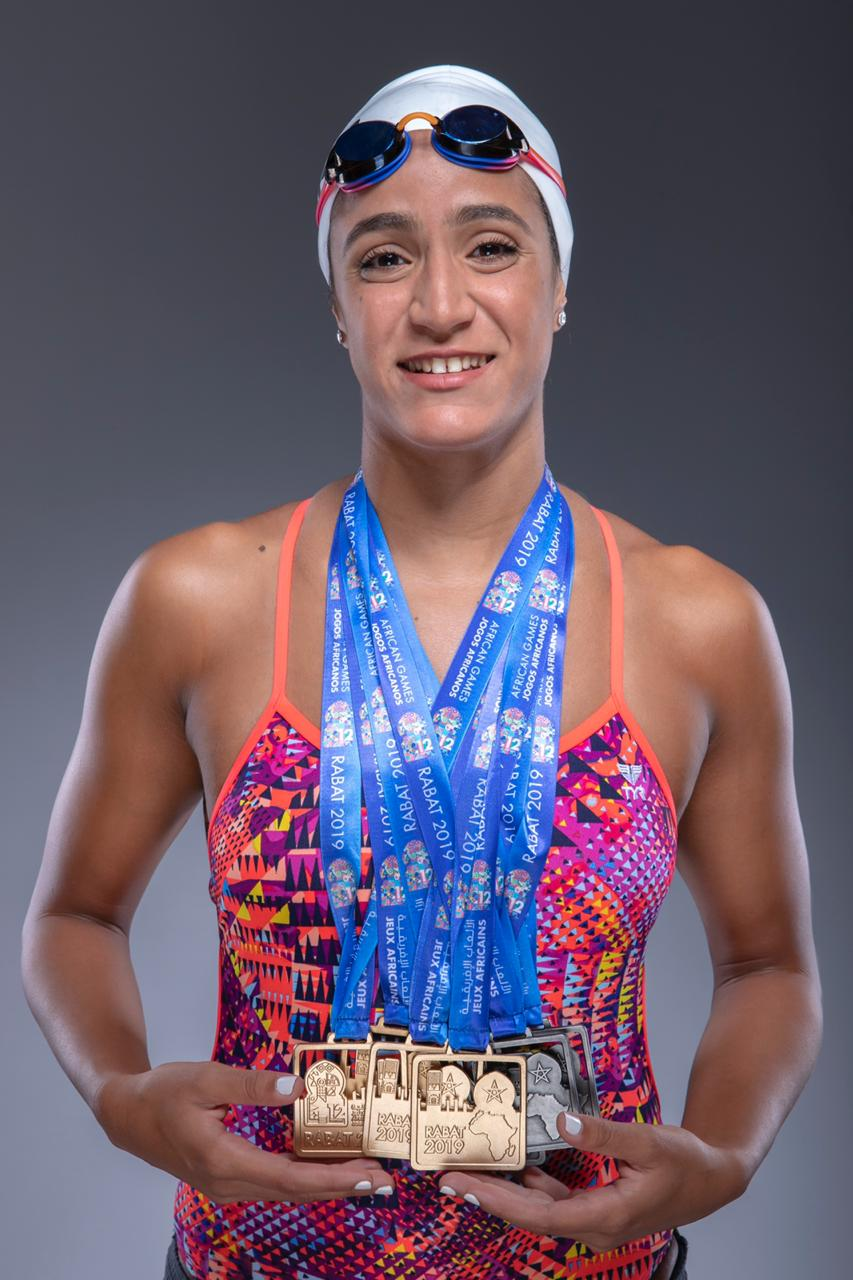
- Hania Moro after 2019 African Games

Personal information
- Born: 1 October 1996 (age 29)

Sport
- Sport: Swimming
Medal record
Representing Egypt
African Games
Gold medal – first place	2019 Rabat	200m freestyle
Gold medal – first place	2019 Rabat	400m freestyle
Gold medal – first place	2019 Rabat	800m freestyle
Gold medal – first place	2019 Rabat	1500m freestyle
Silver medal – second place	2019 Rabat	4x100m freestyle relay
Silver medal – second place	2019 Rabat	4x200m freestyle relay
Silver medal – second place	2019 Rabat	4x100m freestyle relay

Hania Moro (born 1 October 1996) is an iconic Egyptian swimmer. She competed in the women's 400 metre freestyle event at the 2017 World Aquatics Championships. In 2019, she represented Egypt at the 2019 African Games held in Rabat, Morocco.
