= Angola at the 2019 African Games =

- Flag of Angola
- IOC code: ANG
- NOC: Angolan Olympic Committee

in Rabat, Morocco 19 August 2019 – 31 August 2019
- Competitors: 93 (63 men and 30 women) in 14 sports
- Medals Ranked 16th: Gold 2 Silver 2 Bronze 4 Total 8

African Games appearances
- 1987; 1991; 1995; 1999; 2003; 2007; 2011; 2015; 2019; 2023

Angola competed at the 2019 African Games held from 19 to 31 August 2019 in Rabat, Morocco. In total, two gold medals, two silver medals and four bronze medals were won and the country finished in 16th place in the medal table, shared with Namibia.

== Medal summary ==
=== Medal table ===
Medal	Name	Sport	Event	Date
Gold	Men's team	Handball	Men's tournament	29 August
Gold	Women's team	Handball	Women's tournament	29 August
Silver	Manuel Jose Miego Antonio; Aldair Domingos Paulo Neto	Canoeing	Men's C-2 1000 metres	28 August
Silver	Manuel Jose Miego Antonio; Aldair Domingos Paulo Neto	Canoeing	Men's C-2 200 metres	30 August
Bronze	Acácio Quifucussa	Judo	Men's -73 kg	17 August
Bronze	Diassonema Mucungui	Judo	Women's -57 kg	17 August
Bronze	Lia Lima	Swimming	Women's 200 metre butterfly	21 August
Bronze	Sanda Benilson	Canoeing	Men's C-1 1000 metres	28 August

Medals by sport
Sport	1st place, gold medalist(s)	2nd place, silver medalist(s)	3rd place, bronze medalist(s)	Total
Canoeing	0	2	1	3
Handball	2	0	0	2
Judo	0	0	2	2
Swimming	0	0	1	1
Total	2	2	4	8

== 3x3 basketball ==
Angola competed in 3x3 basketball in the men's tournament. The team reached the quarterfinals where they were eliminated by Madagascar.

== Athletics ==
Three athletes represented Angola in athletics.

Neide Dias competed in the women's 1500 metres event and she finished in 8th place. She was also scheduled to compete in the women's 800 metres event but she did not start.

Edson Oliveira competed in the men's 110 metres hurdles event. He competed in the heats but did not advance to the final.

Venâncio Tchingombe competed in the men's half marathon. He finished in 19th place.

== Boxing ==
Five athletes represented Angola in boxing: Pedro Mafisi Cuca, Nafital Afonso Goma, Ernesto Segunda Silvestre Gomes, Francisco Manuel Gomes and Luvumbo Kiala Júnior.

== Canoeing ==
Manuel José Miego António, Simão Manuel Camazaulo, Jairo Francisco Domingos and Aldair Domingos Paulo Neto were scheduled to compete in canoeing.

Sanda Benilson won the bronze medal in the men's C-1 1000 metres event.

Manuel José Miego António and Aldair Domingos Paulo Neto won the silver medals in the men's C-2 200 metres and men's C-2 1000 metres events.

== Chess ==
Esperança Manassa Caxita, Luzia Pirez, Adérito João Assis Pedro and David Miguel Silva competed in chess.

== Fencing ==
Francisco Xavier Da R. Chocolate Manuel competed in fencing in the men's individual foil event. He reached the 1/8 finals where he was eliminated by Mohamed Aziz Metoui (representing Tunisia).

== Gymnastics ==
Angola competed in gymnastics.

== Handball ==
Both Angola's national handball team and women's national handball team competed in the men's tournament and women's tournament respectively. Both the men's team and women's team won the gold medal in their tournaments.

== Judo ==
Two athletes won a medal: Acácio Quifucussa won the bronze medal in the men's -73 kg event and Diassonema Mucungui won the bronze medal in the women's -57 kg event.

== Karate ==
Twizana Mayavanga Daniel, Aldrovandi Rodrigues Manuel Muango and Adilson Patrício Malheiros Neto competed in karate.

== Swimming ==
Four swimmers were scheduled to compete in swimming: João Nunes De Oliveira Frias Duarte, Daniel Francisco, Lia Ana Martins Becker Lima and Catarina Sousa. Lia Ana Martins Becker Lima won the bronze medal in the women's 200 metre butterfly.

== Table tennis ==
Angola competed in table tennis.

Isabel De Oliveira Albino, Elizandro Quibuco André, Aléssio Peter Da Fonseca António, Domingos Francisco Manuel and Ruth Da Conceição De Sousa Tavares competed in table tennis.
