= Swimming at the 2019 African Games =

- Venue: Mohammed V Sports Complex – Olympic Pool
- Location: Casablanca, Morocco
- Dates: 21–24 August
- Nations: 37

Swimming at the 2019 African Games was held from 21 to 24 August 2019 in Casablanca, Morocco.

The event served as a qualifier for the 2020 Summer Olympics in Tokyo, Japan.

== Schedule ==
H	Heats	F	Final

Event↓/Date →	21st Wed		22nd Thu		23rd Fri		24th Sat	
Men's 50 m freestyle							H	F
Men's 100 m freestyle	H	F						
Men's 200 m freestyle			H	F				
Men's 400 m freestyle					F			
Men's 800 m freestyle	F							
Men's 1500 m freestyle							F	
Men's 50 m backstroke					H	F		
Men's 100 m backstroke							H	F
Men's 200 m backstroke	H	F						
Men's 50 m breaststroke	H	F						
Men's 100 m breaststroke			H	F				
Men's 200 m breaststroke					H	F		
Men's 50 m butterfly			H	F				
Men's 100 m butterfly					H	F		
Men's 200 m butterfly	F							
Men's 200 m individual medley							H	F
Men's 400 m individual medley			F					
Men's 4 × 100 m freestyle relay	F							
Men's 4 × 200 m freestyle relay					F			
Men's 4 × 100 m medley relay							F	
Women's 50 m freestyle							H	F
Women's 100 m freestyle	H	F						
Women's 200 m freestyle			H	F				
Women's 400 m freestyle					F			
Women's 800 m freestyle							F	
Women's 1500 m freestyle	F							
Women's 50 m backstroke					H	F		
Women's 100 m backstroke							H	F
Women's 200 m backstroke	F							
Women's 50 m breaststroke	H	F						
Women's 100 m breaststroke			H	F				
Women's 200 m breaststroke					F			
Women's 50 m butterfly			H	F				
Women's 100 m butterfly					H	F		
Women's 200 m butterfly	H	F						
Women's 200 m individual medley							H	F
Women's 400 m individual medley			F					
Women's 4 × 100 m freestyle relay	F							
Women's 4 × 200 m freestyle relay			F					
Women's 4 × 100 m medley relay							F	
Mixed 4 × 100 m freestyle relay					H	F		
Mixed 4 × 100 m medley relay			H	F				

== Participating nations ==
- Algeria
- Angola
- Benin
- Botswana
- Burkina Faso
- Burundi
- Central African Republic
- Republic of the Congo
- Democratic Republic of the Congo
- Djibouti
- Egypt
- Equatorial Guinea
- Eritrea
- Ethiopia
- Gabon
- The Gambia
- Ghana
- Guinea
- Kenya
- Libya
- Malawi
- Mali
- Mauritius
- Morocco
- Mozambique
- Namibia
- Niger
- Nigeria
- Senegal
- Seychelles
- Sierra Leone
- South Africa
- Togo
- Tunisia
- Uganda
- Zambia
- Zimbabwe

== Medal table ==
* Host nation (Morocco)

Rank	Nation	Gold	Silver	Bronze	Total
1	South Africa (RSA)	20	13	12	45
2	Egypt (EGY)	14	17	10	41
3	Algeria (ALG)	5	7	8	20
4	Seychelles (SEY)	2	1	1	4
5	Tunisia (TUN)	1	3	2	6
6	Botswana (BOT)	0	1	1	2
7	Morocco (MAR)*	0	0	4	4
8	Angola (ANG)	0	0	1	1
8	Kenya (KEN)	0	0	1	1
8	Zambia (ZAM)	0	0	1	1
8	Zimbabwe (ZIM)	0	0	1	1
Totals (11 entries)		42	42	42	126

== Medal summary ==
=== Men's events ===
Event	Gold		Silver		Bronze	
50 m freestyle	Ali Khalafalla; Egypt	22.17; GR	Oussama Sahnoune; Algeria	22.19	Brad Tandy; South Africa	22.21
100 m freestyle	Oussama Sahnoune; Algeria	48.97; GR	Ali Khalafalla; Egypt	49.81	Mohamed Samy; Egypt	49.85
200 m freestyle	Marwan Elkamash; Egypt	1:49.10	Mohamed Agili; Tunisia	1:49.22	Yassin Elshamaa; Egypt	1:49.40
400 m freestyle	Mohamed Agili; Tunisia	3:48.94	Marwan Elkamash; Egypt	3:50.95	Ahmed Akram; Egypt	3:51.81
800 m freestyle	Ahmed Akram; Egypt	7:57.21	Mohamed Agili; Tunisia	7:57.87	Marwan Elkamash; Egypt	8:06.90
1500 m freestyle	Ahmed Akram; Egypt	15:19.49	Mohamed Agili; Tunisia	15:26.15	Marwan El-Amrawy; Egypt	15:32.43
50 m backstroke	Mohamed Samy; Egypt	25.26; GR	Abdellah Ardjoune; Algeria	25.61 NR	Driss Lahrichi; Morocco	26.12
100 m backstroke	Abdellah Ardjoune; Algeria	55.02; GR, NR	Mohamed Samy; Egypt	55.57	Martin Binedell; South Africa	56.20
200 m backstroke	Martin Binedell; South Africa	1:59.03; GR	Abdellah Ardjoune; Algeria	2:00.38 NR	Yassin Elshamaa; Egypt	2:03.17
50 m breaststroke	Michael Houlie; South Africa	27.41	Youssef El-Kamash; Egypt	27.52 NR	Wassim Elloumi; Tunisia	28.27
100 m breaststroke	Alaric Basson; South Africa	1:00.96	Youssef El-Kamash; Egypt	1:01.52	Michael Houlie; South Africa	1:01.55
200 m breaststroke	Alaric Basson; South Africa	2:14.21; GR	Youssef El-Kamash; Egypt	2:14.83 NR	Adnan Beji; Tunisia	2:15.73
50 m butterfly	Abdelrahman Elaraby; Egypt	23.81	Ali Khalafalla; Egypt	23.88	Ryan Coetzee; South Africa	24.04
100 m butterfly	Ryan Coetzee; South Africa	53.70	Alard Basson; South Africa	53.88	Yusuf Tibazi; Morocco	53.89
200 m butterfly	Jaouad Syoud; Algeria	2:01.01 NR	Lounis Khendriche; Algeria	2:02.49	Ahmed Salem; Egypt	2:03.79
200 m individual medley	Jaouad Syoud; Algeria	2:02.49	Yassin Elshamaa; Egypt	2:03.98	Neil Fair; South Africa	2:04.15
400 m individual medley	Ramzi Chouchar; Algeria	4:23.53 NR	Ayrton Sweeney; South Africa	4:26.88	Ahmed Salem; Egypt	4:28.35
4 × 100 m freestyle relay	South Africa (RSA); Brad Tandy (51.05); Ryan Coetzee (50.61); Martin Binedell (50.12); Douglas Erasmus (49.85)	3:21.63	Egypt (EGY); Abdelrahman Elaraby (51.57); Marwan Elkamash (51.59); Ali Khalafalla (49.27); Mohamed Samy (49.40)	3:21.83	Morocco (MAR); Souhail Hamouchane (52.11); Driss Lahrichi (51.44); Merwane El Merini (52.04); Samy Boutouil (50.33)	3:25.92 NR
4 × 200 m freestyle relay	Egypt (EGY); Marwan El-Amrawy (1:50.98); Ahmed Akram (1:50.98); Marwan Elkamash (1:53.02); Yassin Elshamaa (1:50.43)	7:25.41	South Africa (RSA); Martin Binedell (1:51.87); Brent Szurdoki (1:50.79); Alard Basson (1:56.70); Alaric Basson (1:55.77)	7:35.13	Algeria (ALG); Mohamed Anisse Djaballah (1:53.54); Lounis Khendriche (1:54.87); Ramzi Chouchar (1:55.28); Moncef Aymen Balamane (1:57.80)	7:41.49
4 × 100 m medley relay	South Africa (RSA); Martin Binedell (56.46); Alaric Basson (1:00.70); Ryan Coetzee (53.18); Douglas Erasmus (49.90)	3:40.24; GR	Egypt (EGY); Mohamed Samy (56.84); Youssef El-Kamash (1:01.17); Khaled Morad (55.17); Ali Khalafalla (48.92)	3:42.10	Algeria (ALG); Abdellah Ardjoune (56.30); Moncef Aymen Balamane (1:02.38); Jaouad Syoud (54.01); Mehdi Nazim Benbara (50.78)	3:43.47 NR

=== Women's events ===
Event	Gold		Silver		Bronze	
50 m freestyle	Erin Gallagher; South Africa	24.95; GR, NR	Farida Osman; Egypt	25.06	Emma Chelius; South Africa	25.25
100 m freestyle	Erin Gallagher; South Africa	55.13; GR	Farida Osman; Egypt	55.62	Emma Chelius; South Africa	55.86
200 m freestyle	Hania Moro; Egypt	2:04.31	Christin Mundell; South Africa	2:04.75	Majda Chebaraka; Algeria	2:05.51
400 m freestyle	Hania Moro; Egypt	4:21.36	Christin Mundell; South Africa	4:22.95	Majda Chebaraka; Algeria	4:24.60
800 m freestyle	Hania Moro; Egypt	8:54.01	Samantha Randle; South Africa	8:55.32	Majda Chebaraka; Algeria	9:07.21
1500 m freestyle	Hania Moro; Egypt	17:06.71	Samantha Randle; South Africa	17:11.07	Carla Antonopoulos; South Africa	17:22.15
50 m backstroke	Erin Gallagher; South Africa	29.05	Felicity Passon; Seychelles	29.17 NR	Naomi Ruele; Botswana	29.22
100 m backstroke	Felicity Passon; Seychelles	1:02.42	Naomi Ruele; Botswana	1:02.62	Kerryn Herbst; South Africa	1:03.76
200 m backstroke	Felicity Passon; Seychelles	2:14.55 NR	Samantha Randle; South Africa	2:15.55	Robyn Lee; Zimbabwe	2:22.50
50 m breaststroke	Kaylene Corbett; South Africa	32.20; GR	Christin Mundell; South Africa	32.70	Tilka Paljk; Zambia	32.92
100 m breaststroke	Kaylene Corbett; South Africa	1:09.75	Christin Mundell; South Africa	1:10.67	Sarah Soliman; Egypt	1:13.36
200 m breaststroke	Kaylene Corbett; South Africa	2:29.23	Christin Mundell; South Africa	2:35.30	Rawan Eldamaty; Egypt	2:39.22
50 m butterfly	Farida Osman; Egypt	25.94; GR	Erin Gallagher; South Africa	26.24 NR	Emma Chelius; South Africa	27.40
100 m butterfly	Farida Osman; Egypt	58.79; GR	Erin Gallagher; South Africa	59.34	Felicity Passon; Seychelles	1:00.61 NR
200 m butterfly	Nour Elgendy; Egypt	2:18.21	Hamida Rania Nefsi; Algeria	2:20.33	Lia Lima; Angola	2:21.51
200 m individual medley	Jessica Whelan; South Africa	2:19.44	Hamida Rania Nefsi; Algeria	2:20.57	Christin Mundell; South Africa	2:21.70
400 m individual medley	Samantha Randle; South Africa	4:55.31	Hamida Rania Nefsi; Algeria	4:58.55	Jessica Whelan; South Africa	5:01.35
4 × 100 m freestyle relay	South Africa (RSA); Erin Gallagher (55.42); Jessica Whelan (58.83); Kerryn Herbst (58.32); Emma Chelius (56.31)	3:48.88; GR	Egypt (EGY); Amina Elsebelgy (59.00); Yasmin Hassan (59.11); Hania Moro (58.97); Farida Osman (56.45)	3:53.53	Algeria (ALG); Amel Melih (57.07) NR; Hamida Rania Nefsi (59.63); Sara El Tahawi (1:02.02); Majda Chebaraka (59.56)	3:58.28
4 × 200 m freestyle relay	South Africa (RSA); Christin Mundell (2:05.98); Jessica Whelan (2:08.07); Carla Antonopoulos (2:09.67); Erin Gallagher (2:06.85)	8:30.57	Egypt (EGY); Nour Elgendy (2:12.37); Logaine Abdellatif (2:10.35); Farida Samra (2:09.24); Hania Moro (2:08.33)	8:40.29	Algeria (ALG); Majda Chebaraka (2:08.34); Amel Melih (2:07.99); Sara El Tahawi (2:16.42); Hamida Rania Nefsi (2:10.00)	8:42.75
4 × 100 m medley relay	South Africa (RSA); Kerryn Herbst (1:04.40); Kaylene Corbett (1:10.88); Erin Gallagher (1:00.27); Emma Chelius (56.87)	4:12.42	Egypt (EGY); Rola Hussein (1:05.96); Sarah Soliman (1:13.53); Farida Osman (1:00.94); Hania Moro (59.64)	4:20.07	Kenya (KEN); Sylvia Brunlehner (1:06.94); Rebecca Kamau (1:13.87); Emily Muteti (1:02.80); Maria Brunlehner (58.11)	4:21.72

=== Mixed events ===
Event	Gold		Silver		Bronze	
4 × 100 m freestyle relay	South Africa (RSA); Douglas Erasmus (50.42); Ryan Coetzee (49.74); Emma Chelius (55.87); Erin Gallagher (55.21); Carla Antonopoulos^{[a]} Brad Tandy^{[a]} Kerryn Herbst^{[a]}	3:31.24; AF, GR	Egypt (EGY); Mohamed Samy (49.86); Ali Khalafalla (49.75); Amina Elsebelgy (58.27); Farida Osman (56.43); Abdelrahman Elaraby^{[a]} Amina Elsebelgy^{[a]} Ahmed Salem^{[a]} Farida Samra^{[a]}	3:34.31 NR	Algeria (ALG); Mehdi Nazim Benbara (51.69); Jaouad Syoud (50.39); Amel Melih (58.02); Majda Chebaraka (59.72); Moncef Aymen Balamane^{[a]} Ramzi Chouchar^{[a]} Hamida Rania Nefsi^{[a]}	3:39.82 NR
4 × 100 m medley relay	South Africa (RSA); Martin Binedell (55.43); Michael Houlie (59.96); Erin Gallagher (58.98); Emma Chelius (56.39); Neil Fair^{[a]} Kaylene Corbett^{[a]} Alard Basson^{[a]} Kerryn Herbst^{[a]}	3:50.76; GR	Egypt (EGY); Mohamed Samy (55.28); Youssef El-Kamash (1:00.83); Farida Osman (59.09); Amina Elsebelgy (58.73); Rola Hussein^{[a]} Mohamed Eissawy^{[a]} Ali Khalafalla^{[a]}	3:53.93 NR	Morocco (MAR); Driss Lahrichi (56.55); Hiba Laknit (1:16.02); Yusuf Tibazi (55.59); Noura Mana (1:00.12); Adil Assouab^{[a]} Samy Boutouil^{[a]}	4:08.28 NR

^{a} Swimmers who participated in the heats only and received medals.
