= Swimming at the 2019 African Games – Men's 50 metre breaststroke =

Men's 50 metre breaststroke at the 2019 African Games
- Venue: Mohammed V Sports Complex – Olympic Pool
- Dates: 21 August (heats and final)
- Competitors: 31 from 19 nations
- Winning time: 27.41

Medalists
gold medal	Michael Houlie	South Africa
silver medal	Youssef El-Kamash	Egypt
bronze medal	Wassim Elloumi	Tunisia

The Men's 50 metre breaststroke competition of the 2019 African Games was held on 21 August 2019.

== Records ==
Prior to the competition, the existing world and championship records were as follows.

	Name	Nation	Time	Location	Date
World record	Adam Peaty	United Kingdom	25.95	Budapest	25 July 2017
African record	Cameron van der Burgh	South Africa	26.54	Budapest	25 July 2017
Games record	Cameron van der Burgh	South Africa	27.18	Brazzaville	7 September 2015

== Results ==
=== Heats ===
The heats were started on 21 August at 10:55.

Rank	Heat	Lane	Name	Nationality	Time	Notes
1	3	4	Youssef El-Kamash	Egypt	27.70	Q
2	4	4	Michael Houlie	South Africa	27.94	Q
3	4	3	Adnan Beji	Tunisia	28.30	Q
4	3	5	Wassim Elloumi	Tunisia	28.34	Q
5	2	4	Brad Tandy	South Africa	28.54	Q
6	4	5	Mohamed Eissawy	Egypt	28.76	Q
7	2	5	Sebastien Kouma	Mali	28.82	Q
8	3	3	Adrian Robinson	Botswana	28.97	Q
9	4	6	Moncef Aymen Balamane	Algeria	29.06	R
10	2	6	Ralph Goveia	Zambia	29.26	R, NR
11	3	6	Samuele Rossi	Seychelles	29.30	
12	2	3	Samy Boutouil	Morocco	29.42	
13	3	2	Abdoul Niane	Senegal	29.56	
14	4	1	Ahllan Bique	Mozambique	29.94	
15	4	7	Adam Chajid	Morocco	30.33	
16	4	2	Ramzi Chouchar	Algeria	30.38	
17	4	8	Kumaren Naidu	Zambia	30.61	
18	2	2	Adama Ndir	Senegal	31.07	
19	2	7	Samuel Ndonga	Kenya	31.16	
19	3	7	Gregory Anodin	Mauritius	31.16	
21	3	8	Ethan Fischer	Botswana	31.71	
22	2	1	Jonathan Chung Yee	Mauritius	32.25	
23	3	1	Adama Ouedraogo	Burkina Faso	32.98	
24	1	5	Momodou Saine	The Gambia	34.41	
25	2	8	Henok Locheriya Lochaber	Ethiopia	34.88	
26	1	3	Abdelmalik Muktar	Ethiopia	35.02	
27	1	4	Tindwende Sawadogo	Burkina Faso	35.27	
28	1	6	Adam Mpali	Gabon	36.68	NR
29			Munyu Kupiata	Democratic Republic of the Congo	38.80	
30			Fabrice Mopama	Democratic Republic of the Congo	40.69	
31			Diosdado Gyanga	Equatorial Guinea	42.97	

=== Final ===
The final was started on 21 August at 17:00.

Rank	Lane	Name	Nationality	Time	Notes
1st place, gold medalist(s)	5	Michael Houlie	South Africa	27.41	
2nd place, silver medalist(s)	4	Youssef El-Kamash	Egypt	27.52	NR
3rd place, bronze medalist(s)	6	Wassim Elloumi	Tunisia	28.27	
4	2	Brad Tandy	South Africa	28.32	
5	7	Mohamed Eissawy	Egypt	28.34	
6	3	Adnan Beji	Tunisia	28.48	
7	8	Adrian Robinson	Botswana	28.88	
8	1	Sebastien Kouma	Mali	28.96	
