= Swimming at the 2019 African Games – Men's 100 metre breaststroke =

Men's 100 metre breaststroke at the 2019 African Games
- Venue: Mohammed V Sports Complex – Olympic Pool
- Dates: 22 August (heats and final)
- Competitors: 19 from 15 nations
- Winning time: 1:00.96

Medalists
gold medal	Alaric Basson	South Africa
silver medal	Youssef El-Kamash	Egypt
bronze medal	Michael Houlie	South Africa

The Men's 100 metre breaststroke competition of the 2019 African Games was held on 22 August 2019.

== Records ==
Prior to the competition, the existing world and championship records were as follows.

	Name	Nation	Time	Location	Date
World record	Adam Peaty	United Kingdom	56.88	Gwangju	21 July 2019
African record	Cameron van der Burgh	South Africa	58.46	London	29 July 2012
Games record	Cameron van der Burgh	South Africa	1:00.19	Brazzaville	6 September 2015

== Results ==
=== Heats ===
The heats were started on 22 August at 10:35.

Rank	Heat	Lane	Name	Nationality	Time	Notes
1	2	5	Alaric Basson	South Africa	1:01.56	Q
2	1	4	Youssef El-Kamash	Egypt	1:01.89	Q
3	3	3	Adnan Beji	Tunisia	1:02.41	Q
4	2	4	Michael Houlie	South Africa	1:02.74	Q
5	1	5	Mohamed Eissawy	Egypt	1:02.83	Q
6	3	5	Wassim Elloumi	Tunisia	1:03.09	Q
7	2	3	Moncef Aymen Balamane	Algeria	1:03.59	Q
8	3	6	Adrian Robinson	Botswana	1:03.84	Q
9	1	3	Sebastien Kouma	Mali	1:04.30	R
10	1	6	Adam Chajid	Morocco	1:06.63	R
11	1	2	Ahllan Bique	Mozambique	1:06.66	
12	2	2	Jonathan Chung Yee	Mauritius	1:07.06	
13	3	2	Samuele Rossi	Seychelles	1:07.21	
14	2	6	Adama Ndir	Senegal	1:07.34	
15	3	7	Ethan Fischer	Botswana	1:08.72	
16	1	7	Kumaren Naidu	Zambia	1:10.69	
17	2	7	Samuel Ndonga	Kenya	1:11.19	
18	2	2	Henok Locheriya Lochaber	Ethiopia	1:51.11	
	3	1	Momodou Saine	The Gambia	Disqualified	
	3	4	Fabrice Mopama	Democratic Republic of the Congo	Did not start	

=== Final ===
The final was started on 22 August at 17:00.

Rank	Lane	Name	Nationality	Time	Notes
1st place, gold medalist(s)	4	Alaric Basson	South Africa	1:00.96	
2nd place, silver medalist(s)	5	Youssef El-Kamash	Egypt	1:01.52	
3rd place, bronze medalist(s)	6	Michael Houlie	South Africa	1:01.55	
4	7	Wassim Elloumi	Tunisia	1:02.24	
5	3	Adnan Beji	Tunisia	1:02.45	
6	2	Mohamed Eissawy	Egypt	1:03.24	
7	8	Adrian Robinson	Botswana	1:03.43	
8	1	Moncef Aymen Balamane	Algeria	1:03.44	
