= Swimming at the 2019 African Games – Men's 50 metre freestyle =

2019 swimming competition

Men's 50 metre freestyle at the 2019 African Games
- Venue: Mohammed V Sports Complex – Olympic Pool
- Dates: 24 August (heats and final)
- Competitors: 46 from 31 nations
- Winning time: 22.17

Medalists
gold medal	Ali Khalafalla	Egypt
silver medal	Oussama Sahnoune	Algeria
bronze medal	Brad Tandy	South Africa

The Men's 50 metre freestyle competition of the 2019 African Games was held on 24 August 2019.

== Records ==
Prior to the competition, the existing world and championship records were as follows.

	Name	Nation	Time	Location	Date
World record	César Cielo	Brazil	20.91	São Paulo	18 December 2009
African record	Roland Schoeman	South Africa	21.67	Beijing	16 August 2008
African record	Roland Schoeman	South Africa	21.67	Barcelona	2 August 2013
Games record	Salim Iles	Algeria	22.34	Algiers	18 July 2007
Games record	Gideon Louw	South Africa	22.34	Maputo	10 September 2011

The following new records were set during this competition.

Date	Event	Name	Nation	Time	Record
21 August	Heat	Brad Tandy	South Africa	22.24	GR
21 August	Final	Ali Khalafalla	Egypt	22.17	GR

== Results ==
=== Heats ===
The heats were started on 24 August at 10:20.

Rank	Heat	Lane	Name	Nationality	Time	Notes
1	6	4	Brad Tandy	South Africa	22.24	Q GR
2	6	5	Ali Khalafalla	Egypt	22.41	Q
3	4	4	Douglas Erasmus	South Africa	22.66	Q
4	5	4	Oussama Sahnoune	Algeria	22.67	Q
5	5	3	Mehdi Nazim Benbara	Algeria	23.13	Q
6	6	3	Souhail Hamouchane	Morocco	23.18	Q
7	6	6	Xander Skinner	Namibia	23.19	Q
7	4	5	Peter Wetzlar	Zimbabwe	23.19	Q
9	5	5	Abdelrahman Elaraby	Egypt	23.34	
10	4	3	Abeiku Jackson	Ghana	23.57	
11	5	2	El Hadj Adama Niane	Senegal	23.75	
12	4	2	Merwane El Merini	Morocco	23.79	
13	5	6	Steven Aimable	Senegal	23.80	
14	5	7	Issa Mohamed	Kenya	24.02	
15	6	8	Ralph Goveia	Zambia	24.17	
16	5	1	Swaleh Talib	Kenya	24.37	
17	4	7	Yellow Yeiyah	Nigeria	24.39	
18	5	8	Daniel Francisco	Angola	24.41	
19	6	7	Gregory Anodin	Mauritius	24.48	
20	6	1	Efrem Ghimai	Eritrea	24.51	
21	4	8	Samuele Rossi	Seychelles	24.57	
22	4	6	Mathieu Bachmann	Seychelles	24.64	
23	4	1	Filipe Gomes	Malawi	24.65	
24	3	5	Ahllan Bique	Mozambique	24.85	
25	6	2	Mathieu Marquet	Mauritius	24.89	
26	3	6	Billy-Scott Irakose	Burundi	24.90	
27	3	4	Ambala Atuhaire Ogola	Uganda	25.02	
28	3	7	Seydoli Alaassan	Niger	25.20	
29	3	3	Belly-Crésus Ganira	Burundi	25.31	
30	3	8	Ayman Khatoun	Zimbabwe	25.39	
31	3	1	Adama Ouedraogo	Burkina Faso	25.67	
32	3	2	Kitso Matija	Botswana	26.03	
33	2	4	Solomon Dzingai	Botswana	26.40	
34	2	5	Kumaren Naidu	Zambia	26.45	
35	2	2	Abdelmalik Muktar	Ethiopia	26.71	
36	2	3	Julius Wyse	Sierra Leone	27.29	
37	2	6	Tindwende Sawadogo	Burkina Faso	27.72	
38	1	5	Eméric Kpegba	Togo	27.75	
39	2	8	Mamadou Bah	Guinea	27.91	
40	2	1	Ebrima Buaro	The Gambia	28.36	
41	1	4	Houssein Gaber	Djibouti	28.37	
42	1	3	Adam Mpali	Gabon	28.45	
43	2	7	Shala Gekabel	Ethiopia	28.89	
44	1	1	Diosdado Miko	Equatorial Guinea	30.80	
45	1	7	Munyu Kupiata	Democratic Republic of the Congo	31.45	
	1	2	Jonathan Mubikayi	Democratic Republic of the Congo	Disqualified	

=== Final ===
The final was started on 24 August at 17:00.

Rank	Lane	Name	Nationality	Time	Notes
1st place, gold medalist(s)	5	Ali Khalafalla	Egypt	22.17	GR
2nd place, silver medalist(s)	6	Oussama Sahnoune	Algeria	22.19	
3rd place, bronze medalist(s)	4	Brad Tandy	South Africa	22.21	
4	3	Douglas Erasmus	South Africa	22.57	
5	1	Xander Skinner	Namibia	23.09	
6	7	Souhail Hamouchane	Morocco	23.10	
7	2	Mehdi Nazim Benbara	Algeria	23.14	
8	8	Peter Wetzlar	Zimbabwe	23.28	
