= Swimming at the 2019 African Games – Men's 100 metre butterfly =

Men's 100 metre butterfly at the 2019 African Games
- Venue: Mohammed V Sports Complex – Olympic Pool
- Dates: 23 August (heats and final)
- Competitors: 29 from 20 nations
- Winning time: 53.70

Medalists
gold medal	Ryan Coetzee	South Africa
silver medal	Alard Basson	South Africa
bronze medal	Yusuf Tibazi	Morocco

The Men's 100 metre butterfly competition of the 2019 African Games was held on 23 August 2019.

== Records ==
Prior to the competition, the existing world and championship records were as follows.

	Name	Nation	Time	Location	Date
World record	Caeleb Dressel	United States	49.50	Gwangju	26 July 2019
African record	Chad le Clos	South Africa	50.56	Kazan	8 August 2015
Games record	Chad le Clos	South Africa	51.24	Brazzaville	7 September 2015

== Results ==
=== Heats ===
The heats were started on 23 August at 10:45.

Rank	Heat	Lane	Name	Nationality	Time	Notes
1	4	3	Jaouad Syoud	Algeria	54.39	Q
2	2	2	Phillip Adejumo	Nigeria	54.56	Q NR
3	4	6	Alard Basson	South Africa	54.57	Q
3	2	4	Mohamed Samy	Egypt	54.57	Q
5	3	4	Ryan Coetzee	South Africa	54.77	Q
6	4	5	Steven Aimable	Senegal	54.96	Q
7	2	3	Ralph Goveia	Zambia	55.10	Q
8	2	5	Yusuf Tibazi	Morocco	55.14	Q
9	3	3	Abeiku Jackson	Ghana	55.20	
10	3	5	Khaled Morad	Egypt	55.25	
11	2	6	Samy Boutouil	Morocco	55.84	
12	4	2	Peter Wetzlar	Zimbabwe	55.88	
13	3	6	Igor Mogne	Mozambique	56.68	
14	3	2	Mathieu Bachmann	Seychelles	57.34	
15	4	7	Niklas Yeboah	Ghana	57.36	
16	3	1	Daniel Francisco	Angola	58.55	
17	3	7	Simon Bachmann	Seychelles	58.57	
18	4	1	Ridhwan Mohamed	Kenya	58.73	
19	4	4	Andisiwe Tayali	Zimbabwe	58.91	
20	3	8	Maaher Harunani	Kenya	58.96	
21	2	1	Xander Skinner	Namibia	59.09	
22	1	4	Adrian Robinson	Botswana	59.12	
23	1	3	Atuhaire Ambala	Uganda	59.16	NR
24	2	7	Daniel Christian	Eritrea	59.99	
25	4	8	Belly-Crésus Ganira	Burundi	1:01.21	
26	2	8	Ousmane Touré	Mali	1:02.67	
27	1	5	Billy-Scott Irakose	Burundi	1:03.68	
28	1	6	Ethan Fischer	Botswana	1:06.23	
29	1	2	Shala Gekabel	Ethiopia	1:09.00	

=== Final ===
The final was started on 23 August at 17:00.

Rank	Lane	Name	Nationality	Time	Notes
1st place, gold medalist(s)	2	Ryan Coetzee	South Africa	53.70	
2nd place, silver medalist(s)	3	Alard Basson	South Africa	53.88	
3rd place, bronze medalist(s)	8	Yusuf Tibazi	Morocco	53.89	NR
4	4	Jaouad Syoud	Algeria	53.95	
5	5	Phillip Adejumo	Nigeria	54.20	NR
6	6	Mohamed Samy	Egypt	54.50	
7	7	Steven Aimable	Senegal	55.03	
8	1	Ralph Goveia	Zambia	55.50	
