= Swimming at the 2019 African Games – Men's 200 metre individual medley =

Swimming competition

Men's 200 metre medley at the 2019 African Games
- Venue: Mohammed V Sports Complex – Olympic Pool
- Dates: 24 August
- Competitors: 12 from 7 nations
- Winning time: 2:02.49

Medalists
gold medal	Jaouad Syoud	Algeria
silver medal	Yassin Elshamaa	Egypt
bronze medal	Neil Fair	South Africa

The Men's 200 metre medley competition of the 2019 African Games was held on 24 August 2019.

== Records ==
Prior to the competition, the existing world and championship records were as follows.

	Name	Nation	Time	Location	Date
World record	Ryan Lochte	United States	1:54.00	Shanghai	28 July 2011
African record	Darian Townsend	South Africa	1:57.03	Montpellier	25 April 2009
Games record	Chad le Clos	South Africa	2:00.70	Maputo	10 September 2011

== Results ==
=== Heats ===
The heats were started on 24 August at 11:35.

Rank	Heat	Lane	Name	Nationality	Time	Notes
1	2	4	Jaouad Syoud	Algeria	2:07.58	Q
2	1	4	Mohamed Samy	Egypt	2:08.03	Q
3	2	3	Neil Fair	South Africa	2:08.09	Q
4	1	3	Ramzi Chouchar	Algeria	2:08.13	Q
5	1	5	Yassin Elshamaa	Egypt	2:09.34	Q
6	2	5	Ayrton Sweeney	South Africa	2:09.87	Q
7	2	6	Abdeljabbar Regragui	Morocco	2:10.78	Q
8	1	6	Adrian Robinson	Botswana	2:16.13	Q
9	2	1	Swaleh Talib	Kenya	2:21.36	
10	1	2	Maaher Harunani	Kenya	2:23.52	
10	2	7	Ethan Fischer	Botswana	2:23.52	
12	1	7	Andisiwe Tayali	Zimbabwe	2:30.92	

=== Final ===
The final was started on 24 August at 17:00.

Rank	Lane	Name	Nationality	Time	Notes
1st place, gold medalist(s)	4	Jaouad Syoud	Algeria	2:02.49	
2nd place, silver medalist(s)	2	Yassin Elshamaa	Egypt	2:03.98	
3rd place, bronze medalist(s)	3	Neil Fair	South Africa	2:04.15	
4	5	Mohamed Samy	Egypt	2:04.87	
4	7	Ayrton Sweeney	South Africa	2:04.87	
6	6	Ramzi Chouchar	Algeria	2:06.32	
7	1	Abdeljabbar Regragui	Morocco	2:10.27	
8	8	Adrian Robinson	Botswana	2:14.83	
