= Swimming at the 2019 African Games – Men's 200 metre breaststroke =

Men's 200 metre breaststroke at the 2019 African Games
- Venue: Mohammed V Sports Complex – Olympic Pool
- Dates: 23 August (heats and final)
- Competitors: 16 from 10 nations
- Winning time: 2:14.21

Medalists
gold medal	Alaric Basson	South Africa
silver medal	Youssef El-Kamash	Egypt
bronze medal	Adnan Beji	Tunisia

The Men's 200 metre breaststroke competition of the 2019 African Games was held on 23 August 2019.

== Records ==
Prior to the competition, the existing world and championship records were as follows.

	Name	Nation	Time	Location	Date
World record	Anton Chupkov	Russia	2:06.12	Gwangju	26 July 2019
African record	Neil Versfeld	South Africa	2:09.61	Rome	30 July 2009
Games record	Sofiane Daid	Algeria	2:14.27	Algiers	16 July 2007

The following new records were set during this competition.

Date	Event	Name	Nation	Time	Record
23 August	Final	Alaric Basson	South Africa	2:14.21	GR

== Results ==
=== Heats ===
The heats were started on 23 August at 11:15.

Rank	Heat	Lane	Name	Nationality	Time	Notes
1	2	4	Alaric Basson	South Africa	2:15.31	Q
2	1	8	Youssef El-Kamash	Egypt	2:17.41	Q
3	1	5	Adnan Beji	Tunisia	2:19.00	Q
4	2	6	Faris Mashaly	Egypt	2:19.28	Q
5	2	5	Wassim Elloumi	Tunisia	2:19.51	Q
6	1	3	Moncef Aymen Balamane	Algeria	2:19.57	Q
7	2	3	Ramzi Chouchar	Algeria	2:20.07	Q
8	1	4	Ayrton Sweeney	South Africa	2:20.41	Q
9	1	6	Jonathan Chung Yee	Mauritius	2:21.81	R
10	2	2	Adam Chajid	Morocco	2:28.84	R
11	1	2	Abdeljabbar Regragui	Morocco	2:30.65	
12	2	7	Samuele Rossi	Seychelles	2:31.01	
13	2	1	Ahllan Bique	Mozambique	2:32.31	
14	1	7	Adrian Robinson	Botswana	2:35.91	
15	1	1	Ethan Fischer	Botswana	2:36.13	
	2	8	Henok Locheriya Lochaber	Ethiopia	Did not start	

=== Final ===
The final was started on 23 August at 17:00.

Rank	Lane	Name	Nationality	Time	Notes
1st place, gold medalist(s)	4	Alaric Basson	South Africa	2:14.21	GR
2nd place, silver medalist(s)	5	Youssef El-Kamash	Egypt	2:14.83	
3rd place, bronze medalist(s)	3	Adnan Beji	Tunisia	2:15.73	
4	2	Wassim Elloumi	Tunisia	2:16.83	
5	8	Ayrton Sweeney	South Africa	2:17.33	
6	7	Moncef Aymen Balamane	Algeria	2:18.20	
7	1	Ramzi Chouchar	Algeria	2:18.65	
8	6	Faris Mashaly	Egypt	2:19.07	
