= Swimming at the 2019 African Games – Women's 200 metre breaststroke =

Women's 200 metre breaststroke at the 2019 African Games
- Venue: Mohammed V Sports Complex – Olympic Pool
- Dates: 23 August (final)
- Competitors: 8 from 5 nations
- Winning time: 2:29.23

Medalists
gold medal	Kaylene Corbett	South Africa
silver medal	Christin Mundell	South Africa
bronze medal	Rawan Eldamaty	Egypt

The Women's 200 metre breaststroke competition of the 2019 African Games was held on 23 August 2019.

== Records ==
Prior to the competition, the existing world and championship records were as follows.

	Name	Nation	Time	Location	Date
World record	Rikke Møller Pedersen	Denmark	2:19.11	Barcelona	1 August 2013
African record	Tatjana Schoenmaker	South Africa	2:21.79	Gwangju	25 July 2019
Games record	Penny Heyns	South Africa	2:28.00	Johannesburg	13 September 1999

== Results ==
=== Final ===
The final was started on 23 August at 17:00.

Rank	Lane	Name	Nationality	Time	Notes
1st place, gold medalist(s)	4	Kaylene Corbett	South Africa	2:29.23	
2nd place, silver medalist(s)	5	Christin Mundell	South Africa	2:35.30	
3rd place, bronze medalist(s)	2	Rawan Eldamaty	Egypt	2:39.22	
4	7	Rebecca Kamau	Kenya	2:39.37	
5	6	Hamida Nefsi	Algeria	2:40.60	
6	1	Hiba Laknit	Morocco	2:46.01	
7	8	Nada Jalal	Morocco	3:00.78	
	3	Nour Elgendy	Egypt	Disqualified	
