= Swimming at the 2019 African Games – Women's 200 metre butterfly =

Women's 200 metre butterfly at the 2019 African Games
- Venue: Mohammed V Sports Complex – Olympic Pool
- Dates: 21 August (heats and final)
- Competitors: 9 from 7 nations
- Winning time: 2:18.21

Medalists
gold medal	Nour Elgendy	Egypt
silver medal	Hamida Nefsi	Algeria
bronze medal	Lia Lima	Angola

The Women's 200 metre butterfly competition of the 2019 African Games was held on 21 August 2019.

== Records ==
Prior to the competition, the existing world and championship records were as follows.

	Name	Nation	Time	Location	Date
World record	Liu Zige	China	2:01.81	Jinan	21 October 2009
African record	Katheryn Meaklim	South Africa	2:09.41	Beijing	12 August 2008
Games record	Mandy Loots	South Africa	2:12.46	Maputo	10 September 2011

== Results ==
=== Heats ===
The heats were started on 21 August at 10:00.

Rank	Heat	Lane	Name	Nationality	Time	Notes
1	1	3	Hamida Nefsi	Algeria	2:21.69	Q
2	2	5	Lia Lima	Angola	2:23.16	Q
3	2	4	Nour Elgendy	Egypt	2:24.04	Q
4	1	5	Rawan Eldamaty	Egypt	2:24.06	Q
5	1	4	Carla Antonopoulos	South Africa	2:24.13	Q
6	2	3	Jessica Whelan	South Africa	2:26.98	Q
7	2	6	Rebecca Ssengonzi	Uganda	2:34.24	Q, WD, NR
8	1	6	Nada Jalal	Morocco	2:35.61	Q
9	2	2	Caitlin Loo	Botswana	2:47.62	Q

=== Final ===
The final was started on 21 August at 17:00.

Rank	Lane	Name	Nationality	Time	Notes
1st place, gold medalist(s)	3	Nour Elgendy	Egypt	2:18.21	
2nd place, silver medalist(s)	4	Hamida Nefsi	Algeria	2:20.33	
3rd place, bronze medalist(s)	5	Lia Lima	Angola	2:21.51	NR
4	6	Rawan Eldamaty	Egypt	2:22.42	
5	2	Carla Antonopoulos	South Africa	2:23.05	
6	7	Jessica Whelan	South Africa	2:26.57	
7	8	Nada Jalal	Morocco	2:32.15	
8	9	Caitlin Loo	Botswana	2:47.51	
