= Swimming at the 2019 African Games – Women's 200 metre individual medley =

Women's 200 metre medley at the 2019 African Games
- Venue: Mohammed V Sports Complex – Olympic Pool
- Dates: 24 August (heats and final)
- Competitors: 12 from 8 nations
- Winning time: 2:19.44

Medalists
gold medal	Jessica Whelan	South Africa
silver medal	Hamida Rania Nefsi	Algeria
bronze medal	Christin Mundell	South Africa

The Women's 200 metre medley competition of the 2019 African Games was held on 24 August 2019.

== Records ==
Prior to the competition, the existing world and championship records were as follows.

	Name	Nation	Time	Location	Date
World record	Katinka Hosszú	Hungary	2:06.12	Kazan	3 August 2015
African record	Kirsty Coventry	Zimbabwe	2:08.59	Beijing	13 August 2008
Games record	Kirsty Coventry	Zimbabwe	2:13.02	Algiers	18 July 2007

== Results ==
=== Heats ===
The heats were started on 24 August at 11:20.

Rank	Heat	Lane	Name	Nationality	Time	Notes
1	2	4	Jessica Whelan	South Africa	2:22.67	Q
2	1	4	Christin Mundell	South Africa	2:24.01	Q
3	2	5	Nour Elgendy	Egypt	2:24.64	Q
4	1	5	Hamida Rania Nefsi	Algeria	2:24.89	Q
5	1	3	Rebecca Kamau	Kenya	2:25.87	Q
6	2	2	Maria Brunlehner	Kenya	2:25.95	Q
7	2	3	Rawan Eldamaty	Egypt	2:26.03	Q
8	2	6	Lina Khiyara	Morocco	2:29.78	Q
9	1	6	Lia Lima	Angola	2:33.31	
10	2	7	Abibat Ogunbanwo	Nigeria	2:34.84	
11	1	2	Nada Jalal	Morocco	2:38.97	
	1	7	Caitlin Loo	Botswana	Disqualified	

=== Final ===
The final was started on 24 August at 17:00.

Rank	Lane	Name	Nationality	Time	Notes
1st place, gold medalist(s)	4	Jessica Whelan	South Africa	2:19.44	
2nd place, silver medalist(s)	6	Hamida Rania Nefsi	Algeria	2:20.57	
3rd place, bronze medalist(s)	5	Christin Mundell	South Africa	2:21.70	
4	2	Rebecca Kamau	Kenya	2:22.18	
5	3	Nour Elgendy	Egypt	2:24.00	
6	7	Maria Brunlehner	Kenya	2:24.02	
7	1	Rawan Eldamaty	Egypt	2:27.39	
8	8	Lina Khiyara	Morocco	2:28.06	
