= Swimming at the 2019 African Games – Women's 100 metre backstroke =

Women's 100 metre backstroke at the 2019 African Games
- Venue: Mohammed V Sports Complex – Olympic Pool
- Dates: 24 August (heats and final)
- Competitors: 17 from 11 nations
- Winning time: 1:02.42

Medalists
gold medal	Felicity Passon	Seychelles
silver medal	Naomi Ruele	Botswana
bronze medal	Kerryn Herbst	South Africa

The Women's 100 metre backstroke competition of the 2019 African Games was held on 24 August 2019.

== Records ==
Prior to the competition, the existing world and championship records were as follows.

	Name	Nation	Time	Location	Date
World record	Regan Smith	United States	57.57	Gwangju	28 July 2019
African record	Kirsty Coventry	Zimbabwe	58.77	Beijing	11 August 2008
Games record	Kirsty Coventry	Zimbabwe	1:00.86	Maputo	7 September 2011

== Results ==
=== Heats ===
The heats were started on 24 August at 11:00.

Rank	Heat	Lane	Name	Nationality	Time	Notes
1	2	4	Felicity Passon	Seychelles	1:03.22	Q
2	1	4	Kerryn Herbst	South Africa	1:04.60	Q
3	3	4	Naomi Ruele	Botswana	1:05.29	Q
4	2	5	Rola Hussein	Egypt	1:06.12	Q
5	3	5	Robyn Lee	Zimbabwe	1:06.95	Q
6	1	5	Hiba Fahsi	Morocco	1:07.15	Q
7	3	3	Sara El Tahawi	Algeria	1:07.21	Q
8	3	2	Sylvia Brunlehner	Kenya	1:07.31	Q, WD
9	2	3	Camille Koenig	Mauritius	1:07.34	Q
10	3	6	Lewethu Mbatha	South Africa	1:07.83	R
11	2	6	Catarina Sousa	Angola	1:08.02	
12	1	3	Logaine Abdelatif	Egypt	1:08.26	
13	1	6	Yasmine Dgaimesh	Morocco	1:09.85	
14	2	2	Imara-Bella Thorpe	Kenya	1:11.67	
15	1	2	Timipame-ere Akiayefa	Nigeria	1:14.44	
16	3	7	Khema Elizabeth	Seychelles	1:20.58	
	2	7	Genet Demissia	Ethiopia	Disqualified	

=== Final ===
The final was started on 24 August at 17:00.

Rank	Lane	Name	Nationality	Time	Notes
1st place, gold medalist(s)	4	Felicity Passon	Seychelles	1:02.42	
2nd place, silver medalist(s)	3	Naomi Ruele	Botswana	1:02.62	
3rd place, bronze medalist(s)	5	Kerryn Herbst	South Africa	1:03.76	
4	6	Rola Hussein	Egypt	1:05.29	
5	2	Robyn Lee	Zimbabwe	1:05.50	
6	8	Camille Koenig	Mauritius	1:07.29	
7	1	Sara El Tahawi	Algeria	1:07.37	
8	7	Hiba Fahsi	Morocco	1:07.40	
