= Swimming at the 2019 African Games – Women's 400 metre individual medley =

Swimming competition

Women's 400 metre medley at the 2019 African Games
- Venue: Mohammed V Sports Complex – Olympic Pool
- Dates: 22 August
- Competitors: 7 from 4 nations
- Winning time: 4:55.31

Medalists
gold medal	Samantha Randle	South Africa
silver medal	Hamida Rania Nefsi	Algeria
bronze medal	Jessica Whelan	South Africa

The Women's 400 metre medley competition of the 2019 African Games was held on 22 August 2019.

== Records ==
Prior to the competition, the existing world and championship records were as follows.

	Name	Nation	Time	Location	Date
World record	Katinka Hosszú	Hungary	4:26.36	Rio de Janeiro	6 August 2016
African record	Kirsty Coventry	Zimbabwe	4:29.89	Beijing	9 August 2008
Games record	Kirsty Coventry	Zimbabwe	4:39.91	Algiers	12 July 2007

== Results ==
Rank	Lane	Name	Nationality	Time	Notes
1st place, gold medalist(s)	4	Samantha Randle	South Africa	4:55.31	
2nd place, silver medalist(s)	5	Hamida Rania Nefsi	Algeria	4:58.55	
3rd place, bronze medalist(s)	3	Jessica Whelan	South Africa	5:01.35	
4	6	Rawan Eldamaty	Egypt	5:09.74	
5	2	Nour Elgendy	Egypt	5:17.43	
6	7	Lina Khiyara	Morocco	5:22.69	
7	1	Nada Jalal	Morocco	5:24.44	
