= Equestrian at the 2019 African Games =

- Venue: Dar Essalam
- Location: Rabat, Morocco
- Dates: 21–24 August

Equestrian at the 2019 African Games was held from 21 to 24 August 2019 in Rabat, Morocco.

The event served as a qualifier for the 2020 Summer Olympics in Tokyo, Japan.

The team event was held on 21 and 22 August and the individual event was held on 21 and 24 August.

== Participating nations ==
- Algeria
- Egypt
- Morocco
- Senegal
- Tunisia
- Zambia
- Zimbabwe

== Medal table ==
* Host nation (Morocco)

Rank	Nation	Gold	Silver	Bronze	Total
1	Morocco (MAR)*	2	1	1	4
2	Egypt (EGY)	0	1	0	1
3	Algeria (ALG)	0	0	1	1
Totals (3 entries)		2	2	2	6

== Medal summary ==
Event	Gold	Silver	Bronze
Team jumping	Morocco	Egypt	Algeria
Individual jumping	El Ghali Boukaa; Morocco	Abdelkebir Ouaddar; Morocco	Vincent Zacharias Bourguignon; Morocco
