= Imane Taleb =

Algerian karateka (born 1996)

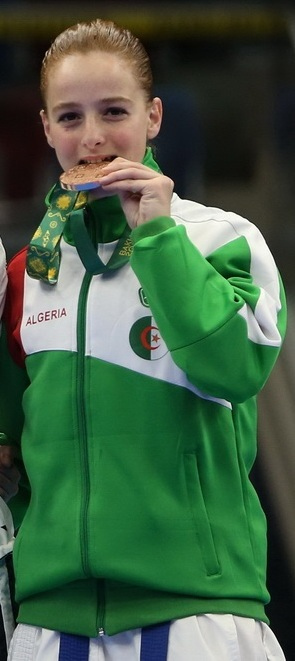
- Born: November 3, 1996 (age 29)
- Nationality: Algeria

Imane Taleb (born 3 November 1996) is an Algerian karateka who has represented Algeria in international competitions. She has claimed medals in Islamic Solidarity Games, African Games and in African Karate Championships representing Algeria mainly taking part in the kumite category. On 26 August 2019, she claimed her first African Games medal in the 50 kg kumite category during the 2019 African Games.

== Career ==
She won a bronze medal in the women's 50 kg kumite category at the 2017 African Karate Championship and later went onto clinch the gold medal in the 2018 African Karate Championships in the same category. She also bagged a bronze medal in the women's 50 kg category during the 2017 Islamic Solidarity Games.

She won one of the bronze medals in her event at the 2019 African Karate Championships held in Gaborone, Botswana. She also represented Algeria at the 2019 African Games and claimed a bronze medal in the women's kumite 50 kg event.
