= Noura Mana =

Moroccan swimmer (born 1997)

Personal information
- Born: 12 December 1997 (age 28)

Sport
- Sport: Swimming
Medal record
Women's swimming
Representing Morocco
African Games
| Bronze medal – third place | 2019 Rabat | 4×100 m mixed medley |

Noura Mana (born 12 December 1997) is a Moroccan swimmer. She competed in the women's 50 metre freestyle event at the 2016 Summer Olympics. In 2019, she represented Morocco at the 2019 African Games held in Rabat, Morocco. She competed in the women's 50 metre freestyle and women's 100 metre freestyle events.
