= Samuele Rossi =

Seychellois swimmer

Personal information
- Born: 22 January 2001 (age 25)

Sport
- Sport: Swimming

Samuele Rossi (born 22 January 2001) is a Seychellois swimmer. In 2019, he represented Seychelles at the 2019 World Aquatics Championships held in Gwangju, South Korea and he finished in 91st place in the heats in the men's 50 metre freestyle event. In the men's 50 metre backstroke he finished in 69th place in the heats.

In 2018, he represented Seychelles at the 2018 Commonwealth Games held in Gold Coast, Australia. He competed in the men's 50 metre breaststroke, men's 100 metre breaststroke and men's 200 metre breaststroke events. He also competed in the men's 200 metre individual medley.

He represented Seychelles at the 2019 African Games held in Rabat, Morocco. He competed in three men's breaststroke events: 50 metre, 100 metre and 200 metre as well as the men's 50 metre freestyle. In each event he did not advance to compete in the final.
