= Hiba Feredj =

Algerian Table Tennis Player (born 1999)

Personal information
- Nationality: Algerian
- Born: 10 May 1999 (age 27) Algeria

Sport
- Country: Algeria
- Sport: Table Tennis

Hiba Feredj (born 10 May 1999) is a table tennis player who competes internationally for Algeria. In April 2022 she was ranked 463rd in the ITTF's women's World Rankings.

== Early life ==
Feredj was born in Algeria, moving to England when she was six. Aged 12, she started playing table tennis at London Academy in Edgware.

== Career ==
During her days at the London Academy, she competed in the English Schools Individual Table Tennis Championships and won which made her "British under-13s female number one". She participated in the 2017 ITTF World Junior Championships, her last event in the junior age group.

In previous competitions she led her Algeria team to beat Nigeria and Egypt.
