= Samantha Randle =

South African swimmer (born 1998)

Personal information
- Born: 24 November 1998 (age 27)

Sport
- Sport: Swimming
Medal record
Women's swimming
Representing South Africa
African Games
Gold medal – first place	2019 Rabat	400 m medley
Silver medal – second place	2019 Rabat	800 m medley
Silver medal – second place	2019 Rabat	1500 m freestyle
Silver medal – second place	2019 Rabat	200 m backstroke
African Championships
Gold medal – first place	2022 Tunis	1500 m freestyle
Silver medal – second place	2022 Tunis	400 m medley
Bronze medal – third place	2022 Tunis	400 m freestyle
Bronze medal – third place	2022 Tunis	200 m backstroke

Samantha Randle (born 24 November 1998) is a South African swimmer. She competed in the women's 1500 metre freestyle event at the 2017 World Aquatics Championships. In 2019, she represented South Africa at the 2019 African Games held in Rabat, Morocco.
