= Boubekeur Rebahi =

Algerian judo player

Personal information
- Born: 6 December 1999 (age 26)
- Occupation: Judoka
- Years active: 2018–2022
- Height: 160 cm (5 ft 3 in)
- Weight: 66 kg (146 lb)

Sport
- Sport: Judo
- Rank: 1st dan black belt
- Team: Algeria national judo team

Profile at external databases
- IJF: 32117
- JudoInside.com: 105972

Boubekeur Rebahi (born 6 December 1999) is an Algerian, male Judoka, who represented his country in different international tournaments.

== Career ==
Rebahi won a bronze medal at the African Cup U18 in Tunis in 2016. He also won a bronze medal at the 2019 African Games in Rabat and a silver medal at the 2019 African Cup U21 in Tunis. He was a player at the 2021 African Judo Championships. Boubekeur, won the 2022 African Open Tunis and the 2022 African Open Algiers. He participated in the 2021 Islamic Solidarity Games. He was one of 16 judokas players selected by the National Technical Department for the 2022 African Championships in Oran as well as the Mediterranean Games in the same year in Oran.
