= Botswana at the 2019 African Games =

- Flag of Botswana
- IOC code: BOT
- NOC: Botswana National Olympic Committee

in Rabat, Morocco 19 August 2019 – 31 August 2019
- Competitors: 103 (60 men and 43 women) in 12 sports
- Medals Ranked 13th: Gold 5 Silver 3 Bronze 6 Total 14

African Games appearances (overview)
- 1991; 1995; 1999; 2003; 2007; 2011; 2015; 2019; 2023

Botswana competed at the 2019 African Games held from 19 to 31 August 2019 in Rabat, Morocco. In total, 103 athletes represented Botswana at the games. Athletes representing Botswana won five gold medals, three silver medals and six bronze medals and the country finished in 13th place in the medal table.

== Medal summary ==
=== Medal table ===
Medal	Name	Sport	Event	Date
Gold	Leungo Scotch	Athletics	Men's 400 metres	28 August
Gold	Galefele Moroko	Athletics	Women's 400 metres	28 August
Gold	Zibani Ngozi; Ditiro Nzamani; Onkabetse Nkobolo; Leungo Scotch	Athletics	Men's 4 × 400 metres relay	29 August
Gold	Mohamed Otukile	Boxing	Men's flyweight (52 kg)	29 August
Gold	Keamogetse Kenosi	Boxing	Women's featherweight (57 kg)	29 August
Silver	Naomi Ruele	Swimming	Women's 100 metre backstroke	24 August
Silver	Aratwa Kasemang	Boxing	Women's lightweight (60 kg)	29 August
Silver	Oarabile Babolayi; Oratile Nowe; Amantle Montsho; Galefele Moroko	Athletics	Women's 4 × 400 metres relay	30 August
Bronze	Karabo Kula	Taekwondo	Women's -46 kg	21 August
Bronze	Naomi Ruele	Swimming	Women's 50 metres backstroke	23 August
Bronze	Ofentse Bakwadi	Karate	Men Kata individual	26 August
Bronze	Men's team	Karate	Men Kata team	26 August
Bronze	Men's team	Karate	Men Kumite team	26 August
Bronze	Women's team	Karate	Women Kata team	26 August

Medals by sport
Sport	1st place, gold medalist(s)	2nd place, silver medalist(s)	3rd place, bronze medalist(s)	Total
Athletics	3	1	0	4
Boxing	2	1	0	3
Karate	0	0	4	4
Swimming	0	1	1	2
Taekwondo	0	0	1	1
Total	5	3	6	14

== Athletics ==
Nijel Amos and Isaac Makwala were scheduled to compete at the 2019 African Games. Amantle Montsho will also represent Botswana in athletics.

Leungo Scotch won the men's 400 metres event and Galefele Moroko won the women's 400 metres event.

== Boxing ==
Nine athletes were scheduled to compete in boxing.

Boxers representing Botswana won two gold medals and one silver medal and the country finished 2nd in the boxing medal table.

== Chess ==
Botswana is scheduled to compete in chess. Four chess players are scheduled to compete: Phemelo Khetho, Providence Oatlhotse, Onkemetse Linda Francis and Refilwe Tsutsu Gabatshwana.

== Cycling ==
Botswana competed in events in both road cycling and mountain bike cycling.

== Judo ==
Thato Lebang, Tirelo Lekoko, Edwin Sello, Letlhogile Tsheko, Gwafila Tema, Happy Taukobong, Victoria Leagajang and Lucky Mabaka will represent Botswana in judo.

== Karate ==
Botswana competed in karate. In total, athletes representing Botswana won four bronze medals.

== Swimming ==
Six athletes represented Botswana in swimming.

Men

Athlete	Event	Heat		Final	
Athlete	Event	Time	Rank	Time	Rank
Solomon Dzingai	50 m freestyle	26.40	33	did not advance	
Solomon Dzingai	100 m freestyle	57.56	27	did not advance	
Solomon Dzingai	200 m freestyle	2:19.05	16	did not advance	
Ethan Fischer	50 m breaststroke	31.71	21	did not advance	
Ethan Fischer	100 m breaststroke	1:08.72	15	did not advance	
Ethan Fischer	200 m breaststroke	2:36.13	15	did not advance	
Ethan Fischer	100 m butterfly	1:06.23	28	did not advance	
Ethan Fischer	200 m individual medley	2:23.52	10	did not advance	
Kitso Matija	50 m freestyle	26.03	32	did not advance	
Kitso Matija	100 m freestyle	55.60	24	did not advance	
Kitso Matija	50 m butterfly	27.77	27	did not advance	
Adrian Robinson	50 m breaststroke	28.97	8 Q	28.88	7
Adrian Robinson	100 m breaststroke	1:03.84	8 Q	1:03.43	7
Adrian Robinson	200 m breaststroke	2:35.91	14	did not advance	
Adrian Robinson	100 m butterfly	59.12	22	did not advance	
Adrian Robinson	200 m individual medley	2:16.13	8 Q	2:14.83	8
Kitso Matija; Ethan Fischer; Solomon Dzingai; Adrian Robinson	4×100 m freestyle relay	—N/a		3:49.93	7

Women

Athlete	Event	Heat		Final	
Athlete	Event	Time	Rank	Time	Rank
Caitlin Loo	50 m freestyle	29.63	24	did not advance	
Caitlin Loo	100 m freestyle	1:07.70	18	did not advance	
Caitlin Loo	200 m freestyle	2:23.08	12	did not advance	
Caitlin Loo	50 m butterfly	31.48	16	did not advance	
Caitlin Loo	100 m butterfly	1:11.04	13	did not advance	
Caitlin Loo	200 m butterfly	2:47.62	9 QR	2:47.51	8
Caitlin Loo	200 m individual medley	DSQ		did not advance	
Naomi Ruele	50 m freestyle	26.74	7 Q	Withdrawn	
Naomi Ruele	100 m freestyle	58.77	6 Q	59.30	6
Naomi Ruele	50 m backstroke	29.62	2 Q	29.22	3rd place, bronze medalist(s)
Naomi Ruele	100 m backstroke	1:05.29	3 Q	1:02.62	2nd place, silver medalist(s)

Mixed

Athlete	Event	Heat		Final	
Athlete	Event	Time	Rank	Time	Rank
Kitso Matija; Naomi Ruele; Caitlin Loo; Adrian Robinson	4×100 m freestyle relay	3:58.76	9 QR	3:57.66	8
Naomi Ruele; Adrian Robinson; Caitlin Loo; Kitso Matija	4×100 m medley relay	4:15.65	5 Q	4:16.45	7

== Taekwondo ==
Botswana competed in Taekwondo. Two athletes represented Botswana: Karabo Kula and Wardell Ernest Samothsozo. Kula won the bronze medal in the women's –46 kg event.

== Tennis ==
Denzel Seetso, Mark Nawa, Tshegofatso Tsiang and Ekua Refilwe Youri will represent Botswana in tennis.

== Volleyball ==
In June 2019 Botswana women's national volleyball team competed in the women's tournament at the 2019 African Games. The men's team was also scheduled to compete but ultimately did not compete.

== Weightlifting ==
Botswana competed in weightlifting. Four weightlifters represented Botswana: Bokang Alphius Kagiso, Kgotla Alphius Kgaswane, Magdeline Moyengwa and Dikabelo Solomon.

== See also ==
- Botswana at the African Games
