= Zambia at the 2019 African Games =

- Flag of Zambia
- IOC code: ZAM
- NOC: National Olympic Committee of Zambia

in Rabat, Morocco 19 August 2019 – 31 August 2019
- Competitors: 68 (34 men and 34 women) in 9 sports
- Medals Ranked 24th: Gold 1 Silver 1 Bronze 3 Total 5

African Games appearances (overview)
- 1965; 1973; 1978; 1987; 1991; 1995; 1999; 2003; 2007; 2011; 2015; 2019; 2023

Zambia competed at the 2019 African Games held from 19 to 31 August 2019 in Rabat, Morocco. In total, athletes representing Zambia won one gold medal, one silver medal and three bronze medals and the country finished in 24th place in the medal table.

== Medal summary ==
=== Medal table ===
Medal	Name	Sport	Event	Date
Gold	Sydney Siame	Athletics	Men's 200 metres	30 August
Silver	Makumba Mwango	Chess	Women's Rapid Individual	27 August
Bronze	Tilka Paljk	Swimming	Women's 50 m breaststroke	21 August
Bronze	Everisto Mulenga	Boxing	Men's 57 kg	28 August
Bronze	Kalombo Mulenga	Badminton	Men's singles	29 August

Medals by sport
Sport	1st place, gold medalist(s)	2nd place, silver medalist(s)	3rd place, bronze medalist(s)	Total
Athletics	1	0	0	1
Badminton	0	0	1	1
Boxing	0	0	1	1
Chess	0	1	0	1
Swimming	0	0	1	1
Total	1	1	3	5

Medals by date
Day	Date	1st place, gold medalist(s)	2nd place, silver medalist(s)	3rd place, bronze medalist(s)	Total
6	21 August	0	0	1	1
12	27 August	0	1	0	1
13	28 August	0	0	1	1
14	29 August	0	0	1	1
15	30 August	1	0	0	1
Total		1	1	3	5

Medals by gender
Gender	1st place, gold medalist(s)	2nd place, silver medalist(s)	3rd place, bronze medalist(s)	Total
Male	1	0	2	3
Female	0	1	1	2
Mixed	0	0	0	0
Total	1	1	3	5

== Athletics ==
Eight athletes competed in athletics: Lumeka Katundu, Luchembe Kennedy, Hellen Makumba, Agness Mazala, Daniel Mbewe, Suwilanji Theresa Fotwe Mpondela, Rhodah Njobvu and Sydney Siame.

Sydney Siame won the gold medal in the men's 200 metres event.

Luchembe Kennedy competed in the men's 400 metres event. He qualified in the heats to compete in the semifinals.

Hellen Makumba competed in the women's 100 metres and women's 4 × 100 metres relay events. In the 100 metres event she qualified to compete in the semifinals.

Agness Mazala also competed in the women's 100 metres event. She did not qualify to compete in the semifinals.

== Badminton ==
Zambia competed in badminton with four players. Kalombo Mulenga won the bronze medal in the men's singles event.

== Boxing ==
Five athletes were scheduled to compete in boxing: Ben Banda, Mbachi Kaonga, Everisto Mulenga, Benny Sichuundu Muziyo and Nkumbu Silungwe.

Everisto Mulenga won the bronze medal in the men's featherweight (57kg) event.

== Chess ==
Stanley Boston Chumfwa, Anndrew Kalenda Kayonde, Mwangala Linah Mululu and Makumba Lorita Mwango competed in chess.

Mwango won the silver medal in the women's rapid individual event.

== Equestrian ==
Ariana Frances Barclay Castle, Diana Dakik, Amber Estelle Homles and Anna Bunty Howard competed in equestrian.

Castle competed in the individual jumping event and Dakik, Homles and Howard competed in both the individual jumping and team jumping events.

== Football ==
Zambia's women's national football team was scheduled to compete in the women's tournament but withdrew and did not compete in their scheduled matches.

== Handball ==
Zambia's national handball team competed in the men's tournament. They were eliminated in the quarterfinals by Angola.

== Judo ==
Five athletes represented Zambia in judo: Andrew Sande Kaswanga, Steven Mung'andu, Mathew Mwango, Taonga Soko and Simon Zulu.

Athlete	Event	Round of 32	Round of 16	Quarterfinals	Semifinals	Repechage 1	Final / BM	
Athlete	Event	Opposition Result	Opposition Result	Opposition Result	Opposition Result	Opposition Result	Opposition Result	Rank
Andrew Sande Kaswanga	Men's -81 kg	Bye	Cherouk (ALG); L	Did not advance				
Mathew Mwango	Men's -73 kg	Bougeuroua (ALG); L	Did not advance					
Taonga Soko	Women's -57 kg	—N/a	Mianbigue (CHA); W	Halata (ALG); L	Did not advance	Marie Sarah Samuelle Sylva (MRI); L	Did not advance	
Simon Zulu	Men's -60 kg	Dabone (CIV); L	Dhouibi (TUN); L	Did not advance				

== Swimming ==
Four athletes represented Zambia in swimming:

Men

Athlete	Event	Heat		Final	
Athlete	Event	Time	Rank	Time	Rank
Ralph Goveia	50 m freestyle	24.17	15	Did not advance	
Ralph Goveia	50 m breaststroke	29.26	10	Did not advance	
Ralph Goveia	50 m butterfly	24.79	7 Q	24.90	8
Ralph Goveia	100 m butterfly	55.10	7 Q	55.50	8
Kumaren Naidu	50 m freestyle	26.45	34	Did not advance	
Kumaren Naidu	50 m breaststroke	30.61	17	Did not advance	
Kumaren Naidu	100 m breaststroke	1:10.69	16	Did not advance	
Kumaren Naidu	50 m butterfly	27.75	26	Did not advance	

Women

Athlete	Event	Heat		Final	
Athlete	Event	Time	Rank	Time	Rank
Lombe Mwape	50 m freestyle	30.03	26	Did not advance	
Lombe Mwape	100 m freestyle	1:05.99	17	Did not advance	
Lombe Mwape	50 m backstroke	36.29	18	Did not advance	
Tilka Paljk	50 m freestyle	27.36	10 QR	27.39	7
Tilka Paljk	50 m breaststroke	32.67	1 Q	32.92	3rd place, bronze medalist(s)
Tilka Paljk	100 m breaststroke	1:15.71	5 Q	1:13.78	4

Mixed

Athlete	Event	Heat		Final	
Athlete	Event	Time	Rank	Time	Rank
Kumaren Naidu; Tilka Paljk; Ralph Goveia; Lombe Mwape	4×100 m medley relay	4:27.78	10	Did not advance	
