= Lamia Eddinari =

Moroccan judoka (born 1999)

Personal information
- Nationality: Moroccan
- Born: 19 July 1999 (age 26)

Sport
- Country: Morocco
- Sport: Judo
- Weight class: –52 kg
Medal record
Women's judo
Representing Morocco
African Games
Bronze medal – third place	2019 Rabat	–52 kg
African Junior Championships
Bronze medal – third place	2019 Dakar	–52 kg

Lamia Eddinari (born July 19, 1999) is a Moroccan judoka. Her last victory was in the African Junior Championships 2019 where she won a gold medal in the women's half lightweight 52 kg.

== Achievement ==
Eddinari won a bronze medal at the African Games in Rabat in 2019. She also won a bronze medal at the African Open in Dakar in 2021.
