= Mozambique at the 2019 African Games =

- Flag of Mozambique
- IOC code: MOZ
- NOC: Comité Olímpico Nacional de Moçambique

in Rabat, Morocco 19 August 2019 – 31 August 2019
- Competitors: 19 (13 men and 6 women) in 7 sports
- Medals Ranked 23rd: Gold 1 Silver 3 Bronze 1 Total 5

African Games appearances
- 1987; 1991; 1995; 1999; 2003; 2007; 2011; 2015; 2019; 2023

Mozambique competed at the 2019 African Games held from 19 to 31 August 2019 in Rabat, Morocco. In total, athletes representing Mozambique won one gold medal, three silver medals and one bronze medal and the country finished 23rd in the medal table.

== Medal summary ==
=== Medal table ===
Medal	Name	Sport	Event	Date
Gold	Nordino Mussa; Tualibudine Mussa	Canoeing	Men's C-2 200 metres	30 August
Silver	Rady Gramane	Boxing	Women's middleweight (75kg)	29 August
Silver	Alcinda Panguane	Boxing	Women's welterweight (69kg)	29 August
Silver	Joaquim Lobo	Canoeing	Men's C-1 200 metres	30 August
Bronze	Jéssica Moiane; Mércia Mucheza	Beach volleyball	Women's tournament	20 August

Medals by sport
Sport	1st place, gold medalist(s)	2nd place, silver medalist(s)	3rd place, bronze medalist(s)	Total
Beach volleyball	0	0	1	1
Boxing	0	2	0	2
Canoeing	1	1	0	2
Total	1	3	1	5

== Athletics ==
Two athletes represented Mozambique in athletics.

Cecilia Guambe competed in the women's 100 metres hurdles event. She competed in the heats and did not qualify to advance to the final. She was also scheduled to compete in the women's 400 metres hurdles event but she did not start.

Creve Armando Machava competed in the men's 400 metres hurdles event. He qualified in the heats but did not finish in the final.

== Boxing ==
Three athletes competed in boxing: Rady Gramane, Alcinda Panguane and Juliano Máquina.

Gramane won the silver medal in the women's middleweight (75kg) event.

Panguane won the silver medal in the women's welterweight (69kg) event.

Máquina competed in the men's flyweight (52kg) event.

== Canoeing ==
Joaquim Lobo won the silver medal in the men's C-1 200 metres event.

Nordino Mussa and Tualibudine Mussa won the gold medal in the men's C-2 200 metres event.

== Judo ==
Three athletes represented Mozambique in judo: Jacira Ferreira, Kevin Loforte and Ayton Siquir.

== Karate ==
Irene Bechane and Marinela Muchanga competed in karate.

== Swimming ==
Ahllan Bique and Igor Mogne represented Mozambique in swimming.

Ahllan Bique competed in the men's 50 metre freestyle, men's 50 metre breaststroke, men's 100 metre breaststroke and men's 200 metre breaststroke events.

Igor Mogne competed in the men's 100 metre butterfly and men's 200 metre freestyle events.

== Volleyball ==
In June 2019, Mozambique's national volleyball team qualified to compete at the 2019 African Games.

Jéssica Moiane and Mércia Mucheza won the bronze medal in the women's beach volleyball tournament.
