= Brad Tandy =

South African swimmer (born 1991)

Personal information
- Full name: Bradley Edward Tandy
- National team: South Africa
- Born: 2 May 1991 (age 35) Ladysmith, KwaZulu-Natal, South Africa
- Height: 1.91 m (6 ft 3 in)
- Weight: 86 kg (190 lb)

Sport
- Sport: Swimming
- Strokes: Freestyle
- College team: The River; University of Arizona
Medal record
Men's swimming
Representing South Africa
African Games
Gold medal – first place	2019 Rabat	4×100 m freestyle
Gold medal – first place	2019 Rabat	Mixed 4×100 m freestyle
Bronze medal – third place	2019 Rabat	50 m freestyle
World Championships (SC)
Bronze medal – third place	2018 Hangzhou	50 m freestyle
Commonwealth Games
Silver medal – second place	2018 Gold Coast	50 m freestyle
Bronze medal – third place	2018 Gold Coast	4×100 m medley

Bradley Edward Tandy (born 2 May 1991) is a retired South African Olympic swimmer. He represented his country at the 2016 Summer Olympics, where he competed in the 50 m freestyle event, finishing 6th overall with a time of 21.79 seconds. In 2018, Tandy won a bronze medal in the 4x100 medley relay at the Commonwealth Games, alongside teammates Chad Le Clos, Cameron van der Burgh and Calvyn Justus. At the same event, he secured a silver medal for the 50 m freestyle with a time of 21.81 seconds.

Tandy competed in the men's 50 metre freestyle event at the 2020 Summer Olympics. The following year, he won the silver medal in the 50 metre freestyle with a time of 22.49 seconds at the 2022 South Africa National Swimming Championships before announcing his retirement.
