= Algeria at the 2019 African Games =

- Flag of Algeria
- IOC code: ALG
- NOC: Algerian Olympic Committee

in Rabat, Morocco 19 August 2019 – 31 August 2019
- Competitors: 255 (143 men and 112 women) in 23 sports
- Medals Ranked 3rd: Gold 36 Silver 35 Bronze 54 Total 125

African Games appearances (overview)
- 1965; 1973; 1978; 1987; 1991; 1995; 1999; 2003; 2007; 2011; 2015; 2019; 2023

Algeria competed at the 2019 African Games held from 19 to 31 August 2019 in Rabat, Morocco. On 17 August, judo events began two days before the opening ceremony on the first day, Algeria achieved 9 medals, including two gold medals by Wail Ezzine in weight 66 kg and Faïza Aissahine in weight 52 kg. On the second and last day were content with only two medals silver and bronze.

== Medal summary ==
=== Medal table ===
Medal	Name	Sport	Event	Date
Gold	Wail Ezzine	Judo	Men's -66 kg	17 August
Gold	Faïza Aissahine	Judo	Women's -52 kg	17 August
Gold	Sid Ali Boudina	Rowing	LW Men's Single Sculls 1000 m	21 August
Gold	Nawel Chiali	Rowing	Women's Single sculls 1000 m	21 August
Gold	Amina Rouba	Rowing	LW Women's Single Sculls 1000 m	21 August
Gold	Oussama Sahnoune	Swimming	Men's 100m freestyle	21 August
Gold	Jaouad Syoud	Swimming	Men's 200m butterfly	21 August
Gold	Nawel Chiali	Rowing	Women's Single sculls 500 m	22 August
Gold	Amina Rouba	Rowing	LW Women's Single Sculls 500 m	22 August
Gold	Ramzi Chouchar	Swimming	Men's 400m Individual Medley	22 August
Gold	Abdellah Ardjoune	Swimming	Men's 100m backstroke	24 August
Gold	Jaouad Syoud	Swimming	Men's 200m individual medley	24 August
Gold	Algeria	Karate	Men's Kumite Team	26 August
Gold	Chaima Midi	Karate	Women's -61kg	26 August
Gold	Mohamed Sofiene Boudjadja; Sami Kherouf	Table tennis	Men's Doubles	26 August
Gold	Amine Bouanani	Athletics	Men's 100 m hurdles	27 August
Gold	Larbi Bourrada	Athletics	Men's Decathlon	27 August
Gold	Hillal Metidji	Gymnastics	Men's Individual all-around	27 August
Gold	Hillal Metidji; Mohamed Bourguieg; Ahmed Anes Maoudj; Mohamed Aouicha; Islem Lettreuch	Gymnastics	Men's Team	27 August
Gold	Ahmed Anes Maoudj	Gymnastics	Men's Pommel Horse	28 August
Gold	Abdelkrim Ouakali	Wrestling	Men's Greco-Roman 77 kg	28 August
Gold	Bachir Sid Azara	Wrestling	Men's Greco-Roman 87 kg	28 August
Gold	Adem Boudjemline	Wrestling	Men's Greco-Roman 97 kg	28 August
Gold	Koceila Mammeri; Linda Mazri	Badminton	Mixed Doubles	29 August
Gold	Youcef Reguigui	Cycling	Men's Road Race	29 August
Gold	Abdelmalik Lahoulou	Athletics	Men's 400m Hurdles	29 August
Gold	Mohamed Bourguieg	Gymnastics	Men's Vault	29 August
Gold	Hichem Khalil Cherabi	Athletics	Men's Pole Vault	29 August
Gold	Hillal Metidji	Gymnastics	Men's Parallel Bars	29 August
Gold	Abdelhafid Benchebla	Boxing	Men's Heavyweight	29 August
Gold	Roumaysa Boualam	Boxing	Women's Flyweight	29 August
Gold	Rabeh Chouya	Weightlifting	Men's +109 kg	30 August
Gold	Rabeh Chouya	Weightlifting	Men's +109 kg CleanL-Jerk	30 August
Gold	Rabeh Chouya	Weightlifting	Men's +109 kg Snatch	30 August
Gold	Yasser Triki	Athletics	Men's Long Jump	30 August
Gold	Koceila Mammeri; Linda Mazri	Badminton	Mixed Doubles	30 August
Gold	Abdelhak Kherbache	Wrestling	Men's Freestyle −57 kg	30 August
Silver	Yamina Halata	Judo	Women's -57 kg	17 August
Silver	Amina Belkadi	Judo	Women's -63 kg	17 August
Silver	Mohamed Sofiane Belrekaa	Judo	Men's +100 kg	18 August
Silver	Rania Hamida Nefsi	Swimming	Women's 200m butterfly	21 August
Silver	Abdellah Ardjoune	Swimming	Men's 200m backstroke	21 August
Silver	Lounis Khendriche	Swimming	Men's 200m butterfly	21 August
Silver	Sid Ali Boudina	Rowing	LW Men's Single Sculls 500 m	22 August
Silver	Rania Hamida Nefsi	Swimming	Women's 400m Individual Medley	22 August
Silver	Abdellah Ardjoune	Swimming	Men's 50m backstroke	23 August
Silver	Oussama Sahnoune	Swimming	Men's 50m freestyle	24 August
Silver	Rania Hamida Nefsi	Swimming	Women's 200m Individual Medley	24 August
Silver	Oussama Hellal; Imene Maldji; Nazim Omar Benyelles; Kahina Mebarki	Triathlon	Mixed Team Relay	25 August
Silver	Mohamed Abderrahime Belarbi; Halla Bouksani; Yassimina Chibah; Seïf-Eddine Larbaoui; Koceila Mammeri; Linda Mazri; Youcef Sabri Medel; Mohamed Abdelaziz Ouchefoun; Malak Ouchefoun	Badminton	Mixed Team	25 August
Silver	Adlane Arab; Lina Nassr; Sabrina Latreche; Bilel Youcef Bellahcene	Chess	Rapid Mixed Team	25 August
Silver	Mohamed Faycel Bouakel	Karate	Men's Kumite -67kg	26 August
Silver	Hocine Daikhi	Karate	Men's +84kg	26 August
Silver	Lahna Salem; Sofia Nair; Chama Temmami; Medina Medjahdi; Fatima Ahlem Mokhtari	Gymnastics	Women's Team	26 August
Silver	Nafaa Sariak	Weightlifting	Men's 73 kg	27 August
Silver	Nafaa Sariak	Weightlifting	Men's 73 kg CleanL-Jerk	27 August
Silver	Nafaa Sariak	Weightlifting	Men's 73 kg Snatch	27 August
Silver	Yasser Triki	Athletics	Men's Triple Jump	27 August
Silver	Mohamed Bourguieg	Gymnastics	Men's Individual all-around	27 August
Silver	Mohamed Bourguieg	Gymnastics	Men's Pommel Horse	28 August
Silver	Mohamed Aouicha	Gymnastics	Men's Floor Exercise	28 August
Silver	Mohamed Bourguieg	Gymnastics	Men's Rings	28 August
Silver	Saddam Messaoui	Weightlifting	Men's 96 kg	29 August
Silver	Saddam Messaoui	Weightlifting	Men's 96 kg CleanL-Jerk	29 August
Silver	Saddam Messaoui	Weightlifting	Men's 96 kg Snatch	29 August
Silver	Ahmed Anes Maoudj	Gymnastics	Men's Vault	29 August
Silver	Hillal Metidji	Gymnastics	Men's Horizontal Bar	29 August
Silver	Fateh Benfredjallah	Wrestling	Men's Freestyle −86 kg	30 August
Silver	Bouchra Fatima Zohra Hirech	Weightlifting	Women's 87 kg	30 August
Silver	Bouchra Fatima Zohra Hirech	Weightlifting	Women's 87 kg CleanL-Jerk	30 August
Silver	Bouchra Fatima Zohra Hirech	Weightlifting	Women's 87 kg Snatch	30 August
Bronze	Hadjer Mecerem	Judo	Women's -48 kg	17 August
Bronze	Meriem Moussa	Judo	Women's -52 kg	17 August
Bronze	Salim Rebahi	Judo	Men's -60 kg	17 August
Bronze	Boubekeur Rebahi	Judo	Men's -66 kg	17 August
Bronze	Imad Eddine Cherouk	Judo	Men's -81 kg	17 August
Bronze	Kaouthar Ouallal	Judo	Women's -78 kg	18 August
Bronze	Oussama Habiche	Rowing	Men's Single Sculls 1000 m	21 August
Bronze	Amel Melih; Rania Hamida Nefsi; Majda Chebaraka; Souad Nafissa Cherouati	Swimming	Women's 4x100m freestyle	21 August
Bronze	Oussama Habiche	Rowing	Men's Single Sculls 500 m	22 August
Bronze	Majda Chebaraka	Swimming	Women's 200m freestyle	22 August
Bronze	Majda Chebaraka; Souad Nafissa Cherouati; Amel Melih; Rania Hamida Nefsi	Swimming	Women's 4x200m Freestyle Relay	22 August
Bronze	Ali Boughrab; Mohamed Mesrati; Anis Smati; Sofiane Mesraoui	Equestrian	Men's Team jumping	22 August
Bronze	Hiba Feredj; Katia Kessaci; Lynda Loghraibi	Table tennis	Women's Team	23 August
Bronze	Majda Chebaraka; Oussama Sahnoune; Amel Melih; Mehdi Nazim Benbara	Swimming	4x100m Free Relay Mixed	23 August
Bronze	Kamel Ait Daoud; Nihad Benchadli	Rowing	Relay 2 × 500 metres single sculls Mixed	23 August
Bronze	Jaouad Syoud; Ramzi Chouchar; Lounis Khendriche; Moncef Aymen Balamane	Swimming	Men's 4x200m freestyle	23 August
Bronze	Majda Chebaraka	Swimming	Women's 400m freestyle	23 August
Bronze	Oussama Hellal	Triathlon	Men's Elite	24 August
Bronze	Majda Chebaraka	Swimming	Women's 800m freestyle	24 August
Bronze	Sara Ain Elhayet El Tahawi; Souad Nafissa Cherouati; Amel Melih; Rania Hamida Nefsi	Swimming	Women's 4x100m Freestyle Relay	24 August
Bronze	Jaouad Syoud; Abdellah Ardjoune; Lounis Khendriche; Moncef Aymen Balamane	Swimming	Men's 4x100m medley relay	24 August
Bronze	Meryam Benmiloud	Weightlifting	Women's 55 kg	26 August
Bronze	Meryam Benmiloud	Weightlifting	Women's 55 kg CleanL-Jerk	26 August
Bronze	Meryam Benmiloud	Weightlifting	Women's 55 kg Snatch	26 August
Bronze	Saadia Zeggane	Shooting	Women's Trap	26 August
Bronze	Lahna Salem	Gymnastics	Women's Individual All-Around	26 August
Bronze	Abdelhakim Haoua	Karate	Men's Kata individual	26 August
Bronze	Algeria	Karate	Men's Kata Team	26 August
Bronze	Anis Samy Brahimi	Karate	Men's -84kg	26 August
Bronze	Algeria	Karate	Women's Kata Team	26 August
Bronze	Algeria	Karate	Women's Kumite Team	26 August
Bronze	Lamya Matoub	Karate	Women's -68kg	26 August
Bronze	Widad Draou	Karate	Women's Kumite -55kg	26 August
Bronze	Imane Taleb	Karate	Women's Kumite -50kg	26 August
Bronze	Manel Kamilia Hadj Said	Karate	Women's Kata individual	26 August
Bronze	Katia Kessaci; Lynda Loghraibi	Table tennis	Women's Doubles	26 August
Bronze	Sabrina Latreche	Chess	Women's Rapid Individual	27 August
Bronze	Oussama Mordjane	Boxing	Men's Bantamweight	28 August
Bronze	Mohamed Houmri	Boxing	Men's Light Heavyweight	28 August
Bronze	Lahna Salem	Gymnastics	Women's Uneven Bars	28 August
Bronze	Oussama Djbali	Canoeing	Men's K1 1000m	28 August
Bronze	Mohamed Flissi	Boxing	Men's Flyweight	28 August
Bronze	Bilel Youcef Bellahcene	Chess	Men's Blitz Individual	28 August
Bronze	Lina Nassr	Chess	Women's Blitz Individual	28 August
Bronze	Hamza Haloui	Wrestling	Men's Greco-Roman 130 kg	28 August
Bronze	Abdennour Laouni	Wrestling	Men's Greco-Roman 60 kg	28 August
Bronze	Abdelmalek Merabet	Wrestling	Men's Greco-Roman 67 kg	28 August
Bronze	Algeria	Canoeing	Men's K4 500m	29 August
Bronze	Nassim Saidi	Cycling	Men's Road Race	29 August
Bronze	Sofia Nair	Gymnastics	Women's Beam	29 August
Bronze	Larbi Bourrada	Athletics	Men's Pole Vault	29 August
Bronze	Lahna Salem	Gymnastics	Women's Floor Exercise	29 August
Bronze	Mohamed Aouicha	Gymnastics	Men's Horizontal Bar	29 August
Bronze	Imad Eddine Bakri; Abdelmajid Hocine; Ayoub Rahlaoui	Archery	Men's Team Recurve	30 August

Medals by sport
Sport	1st place, gold medalist(s)	2nd place, silver medalist(s)	3rd place, bronze medalist(s)	Total
Archery	0	0	1	1
Athletics	5	1	1	7
Badminton	1	1	0	2
Boxing	2	0	3	5
Cycling	1	0	1	2
Canoeing	0	0	2	2
Chess	0	1	3	4
Equestrian	0	0	1	1
Judo	2	3	6	11
Gymnastics	5	7	5	17
Karate	2	2	9	13
Rowing	5	1	3	9
Shooting	0	0	1	1
Swimming	5	7	8	20
Table tennis	1	0	2	3
Triathlon	0	1	1	2
Volleyball	0	1	0	1
Weightlifting	3	9	3	15
Wrestling	4	1	4	9
Total	36	35	54	125

Medals by date
Day	Date	1st place, gold medalist(s)	2nd place, silver medalist(s)	3rd place, bronze medalist(s)	Total
1	16 August	0	0	0	0
2	17 August	2	2	5	9
3	18 August	0	1	1	2
4	19 August	0	0	0	0
5	20 August	0	0	0	0
6	21 August	5	3	2	10
7	22 August	3	2	4	9
8	23 August	0	1	5	6
9	24 August	2	2	4	8
10	25 August	0	3	0	3
11	26 August	2	3	14	19
12	27 August	4	2	4	10
13	28 August	4	3	10	17
14	29 August	8	5	6	19
15	30 August	3	4	4	11
16	31 August	0	0	0	0
Total		33	32	60	125

Medals by gender
Gender	1st place, gold medalist(s)	2nd place, silver medalist(s)	3rd place, bronze medalist(s)	Total
Male	25	22	28	75
Female	7	6	30	43
Mixed	2	3	2	7
Total	33	32	60	125

Multiple medalists
Name	Sport	1st place, gold medalist(s)	2nd place, silver medalist(s)	3rd place, bronze medalist(s)	Total
Majda Chebaraka	Swimming	0	0	6	6
Rania Hamida Nefsi	Swimming	0	2	3	5
Jaouad Syoud	Swimming	2	0	2	4
Abdellah Ardjoune	Swimming	1	2	1	4
Oussama Sahnoune	Swimming	1	1	1	3
Souad Nafissa Cherouati	Swimming	0	0	3	3
Ramzi Chouchar	Swimming	1	0	2	3
Nawel Chiali	Rowing	2	0	0	2
Amina Rouba	Rowing	2	0	0	2
Sid Ali Boudina	Rowing	1	1	0	2
Oussama Habiche	Rowing	0	0	2	2

== Archery ==
Algeria competed in archery.

== Athletics ==
Algeria competed in athletics with 11 (8 men and 3 women).

Key

- Note – Ranks given for track events are within the athlete's heat only
- Q = Qualified for the next round
- q = Qualified for the next round as a fastest loser or, in field events, by position without achieving the qualifying target
- NR = National record
- N/A = Round not applicable for the event
- Bye = Athlete not required to compete in round

Men
Track & road events

Athlete	Event	Heat		Semifinal		Final	
Athlete	Event	Result	Rank	Result	Rank	Result	Rank
Lyes Mokdal	100 m hurdles	—N/a		13.98	Q	DQ	
Mohamed Amine Bouanani	100 m hurdles	—N/a		13.74	Q	13.60	1st place, gold medalist(s)
Abdelmalik Lahoulou	400 m hurdles	—N/a		50..03	1 Q		1st place, gold medalist(s)
Mohamed Belbachir	800 m	1:50.23	Q	1:48.12	Q	1:46.10	7
Bilal Tabti	3000 m steeplechase	—N/a				8:45.59	10

Field events

Athlete	Event	Final	
Athlete	Event	Distance	Position
Yasser Triki	Triple Jump	16.71	2nd place, silver medalist(s)
Yasser Triki	Long Jump	8.01	1st place, gold medalist(s)
Hichem Khalil Cherabi	Pole vault	5.00	1st place, gold medalist(s)
Larbi Bourrada	Pole vault	4.70	3rd place, bronze medalist(s)

Combined events – Decathlon

Athlete	Event	100 m	LJ	SP	HJ	400 m	110H	DT	PV	JT	1500 m	Final	Rank
Larbi Bourrada	Result	11.18	6.85	12.55	1.96	50.66	14.81	37.82	4.60	59.69	5:08.32	6073	1st place, gold medalist(s)
Larbi Bourrada	Points											6073	1st place, gold medalist(s)

Women
Track & road events

Athlete	Event	Semifinal		Final	
Athlete	Event	Result	Rank	Result	Rank
Loubna Benhadja	400 m hurdles	1:01.04	5	Did not advance	
Souad Azzi	20 km walk	—N/a		1:38:48	5
Zouina Bouzebra	Hammer throw	—N/a		63.34	4

== Badminton ==
Algeria competed in badminton with 9 athletes (5 men and 4 women).

Athlete	Event	Round Robin			Quarterfinals	Semifinal	Final / BM	
Athlete	Event	Opposition Result	Opposition Result	Rank	Opposition Result	Opposition Result	Opposition Result	Rank
Mohamed Abderrahime Belarbi; Halla Bouksani; Yassimina Chibah; Seïf-Eddine Larbaoui; Koceila Mammeri; Linda Mazri; Youcef Sabri Medel; Mohamed Abdelaziz Ouchefoun; Malak Ouchefoune	Mixed team	Democratic Republic of the Congo; W 5–0	Uganda; W 5–0	1 Q	Kenya; W 3–0	South Africa; W 3–2	Nigeria; L 0–3	2nd place, silver medalist(s)

== Boxing ==
Algeria participate in Boxing with 11 boxers (8 men and 3 Women),.

Men

Athlete	Event	Round of 32	Round of 16	Quarterfinals	Semifinals	Final	
Athlete	Event	Opposition Result	Opposition Result	Opposition Result	Opposition Result	Opposition Result	Rank
Mohamed Flissi	Flyweight	Bye	Rodrigues (CPV); W 5–0	Sulemanu (GHA); W 3–2	Mahommed (BOT); L 2–3	Did not advance	3rd place, bronze medalist(s)
Oussama Mordjane	Bantamweight	Bye	Mokhotho (LES); W 5–0	Mombey (GAB); W 3–2	Msembe (UGA); L KO R1	Did not advance	3rd place, bronze medalist(s)
Reda Benbaziz	Lightweight	Gomes (ANG); W 5–0	Mmopiemang (BOT); W 5–0	Colin (MRI); L 2–3	Did not advance		
Kramou Chemseddine	Welterweight	—N/a	Boudrar (MAR); L 0–5	Did not advance			
Sofiane Tabi	Middleweight	Fall (SEN); W 5–0	Quartey (GHA); W 5–0	Abdelmoneim (EGY); L 3–3	Did not advance		
Mohamed Houmri	Light Heavyweight	—N/a	Lawal (NGR); W 5–0	Abdoul Kader (NIG); W RSC	Abdelgawwad (EGY); L 1–4	Did not advance	3rd place, bronze medalist(s)
Abdelhafid Benchebla	Heavyweight	—N/a	Akankolim (GHA); W 5–0	Junior (ANG); W 5–0	Bye	Baalla (MAR); W 3–1	1st place, gold medalist(s)
Chouaib Bouloudinat	Super Heavyweight	—N/a	Kutsuke (GHA); W 5–0	Hafez (EGY); L 1–4	Did not advance		

Women

Athlete	Event	Round of 16	Quarterfinals	Semifinals	Final	
Athlete	Event	Opposition Result	Opposition Result	Opposition Result	Opposition Result	Rank
Roumaïssa Boualem	Flyweight	Mohamed (EGY); W 5–0	Modukanele (BOT); W 5–0	Oriyomi (NGR); W 5–0	Mouttaki (MAR); W 3–2	1st place, gold medalist(s)
Fatma Zohra Abdelkader	Featherweight	Oshoba (NGR); L 0–5	Did not advance			
Imane Khelif	Lightweight	Bye	Hlimi Moulahi (TUN); L 1–4	Did not advance		

== Cycling ==
Algeria competed in cycling with 11 cyclists.

=== Road ===
Athlete	Event	Time	Rank
Azzedine Lagab	Men's Individual Time Trial	49:55.729	9
Youcef Reguigui	Men's Individual Time Trial	52:58.675	20
Racha Belkacem Benounane	Women's Individual Time Trial	46:23.638	15
Aïcha Tihar	Women's Individual Time Trial	47:26.314	16

=== Mountain biking ===
Athlete	Event	Time	Rank
Abdelghani Fellah	Men's Cross Country	-4 Lap	16
Julien Bernard Foucart	Men's Cross Country	DNS	
Youcef Khelil	Men's Cross Country	-1 Lap	11
Racha Belkacem Benounane	Women's Cross Country	-2 Lap	7
Yasmine El Meddah	Women's Cross Country	-2 Lap	8
Aïcha Tihar	Women's Cross Country	DNS	
Abdelghani Fellah	Men's Cross Country Marathon	DNF	23
Julien Bernard Foucart	Men's Cross Country Marathon	2:13:36.146	18
Youcef Khelil	Men's Cross Country Marathon	2:04:33.140	8
Aïcha Tihar	Women's Cross Country Marathon	DNS	

== Equestrian ==
Algeria competed in equestrian with six team members. They won the bronze medal in the Men's Team jumping event.

== Football ==
Algeria women's national under-20 football team competed in the women's tournament at the 2019 African Games.

=== Group stage ===
==== Group A ====
Pos	Team	Pld	W	D	L	GF	GA	GD	Pts	Qualification
1	Morocco (H)	1	1	0	0	3	2	+1	3	Advance to semi-final
2	Algeria	1	0	0	1	2	3	−1	0	Advance to semi-final
3	Equatorial Guinea	0	0	0	0	0	0	0	0	
4	Mali	0	0	0	0	0	0	0	0	

First match(es) will be played: unknown. Source:
(H) Hosts

== Handball ==
Both Algeria's national handball team and women's national handball team competed in handball.

Men

=== Group B ===
Pos	Team	Pld	W	D	L	GF	GA	GD	Pts	Qualification
1	Angola	4	3	1	0	109	86	+23	7	Quarterfinals
2	Algeria	4	2	2	0	101	94	+7	6	Quarterfinals
3	DR Congo	4	1	2	1	89	94	−5	4	Quarterfinals
4	Nigeria	4	1	1	2	91	93	−2	3	Quarterfinals
5	Burkina Faso	4	0	0	4	92	115	−23	0	

Source: AG 2019
Rules for classification: 1) Points; 2) Head-to-head points; 3) Head-to-head goal difference; 4) Head-to-head goals scored; 5) Goal difference; 6) Goals scored; 7) Draw.

20 August 2019; 14:00	Algeria	31–26	Burkina Faso	Salle Complexe Sportif Mohammed V, Casablanca
20 August 2019; 14:00		(13–14)		Salle Complexe Sportif Mohammed V, Casablanca
20 August 2019; 14:00		Report		Salle Complexe Sportif Mohammed V, Casablanca

21 August 2019; 18:00	Algeria	24–22	Nigeria	Salle Complexe Sportif Mohammed V, Casablanca
21 August 2019; 18:00		(7–11)		Salle Complexe Sportif Mohammed V, Casablanca
21 August 2019; 18:00		Report		Salle Complexe Sportif Mohammed V, Casablanca

22 August 2019; 16:00	DR Congo	20–20	Algeria	Salle Complexe Sportif Mohammed V, Casablanca
22 August 2019; 16:00		(10–11)		Salle Complexe Sportif Mohammed V, Casablanca
22 August 2019; 16:00		Report		Salle Complexe Sportif Mohammed V, Casablanca

25 August 2019; 16:00	Angola	26–26	Algeria	Mohammed V Sports Complex
25 August 2019; 16:00		(13–10)		Mohammed V Sports Complex

=== Quarterfinals ===
26 August 2019; 14:00	Algeria	33–18	Guinea	Salle Complexe Sportif Mohammed V, Casablanca
26 August 2019; 14:00		(12–8)		Salle Complexe Sportif Mohammed V, Casablanca
26 August 2019; 14:00		Report		Salle Complexe Sportif Mohammed V, Casablanca

Women

=== Group B ===
Pos	Team	Pld	W	D	L	GF	GA	GD	Pts	Qualification
1	Cameroon	4	4	0	0	155	94	+61	8	Quarterfinals
2	Algeria	4	3	0	1	113	110	+3	6	Quarterfinals
3	Tunisia	4	2	0	2	135	106	+29	4	Quarterfinals
4	Uganda	4	1	0	3	79	119	−40	2	Quarterfinals
5	Kenya	4	0	0	4	72	125	−53	0	9th place game

Source: AG 2019
Rules for classification: 1) Points; 2) Head-to-head points; 3) Head-to-head goal difference; 4) Head-to-head goals scored; 5) Goal difference; 6) Goals scored; 7) Draw.

20 August 2019; 12:00	Cameroon	33–26	Algeria	Salle Complexe Sportif Mohammed V, Casablanca
20 August 2019; 12:00		(16–11)		Salle Complexe Sportif Mohammed V, Casablanca
20 August 2019; 12:00		Report		Salle Complexe Sportif Mohammed V, Casablanca

22 August 2019; 18:00	Algeria	26–24	Tunisia	Salle Ibrahim Zahar, Casablanca
22 August 2019; 18:00		(15–12)		Salle Ibrahim Zahar, Casablanca
22 August 2019; 18:00		Report		Salle Ibrahim Zahar, Casablanca

24 August 2019; 14:00	Algeria	28–25	Kenya	Salle Ibrahim Zahar, Casablanca
24 August 2019; 14:00		(14–12)		Salle Ibrahim Zahar, Casablanca
24 August 2019; 14:00		Report		Salle Ibrahim Zahar, Casablanca

25 August 2019; 12:00	Algeria	33–28	Uganda	Salle Complexe Sportif Mohammed V, Casablanca
25 August 2019; 12:00		(12–13)		Salle Complexe Sportif Mohammed V, Casablanca
25 August 2019; 12:00		Report		Salle Complexe Sportif Mohammed V, Casablanca

=== Quarterfinals ===
26 August 2019; 12:00	Algeria	27–29	Guinea	Salle Ibrahim Zahar, Casablanca
26 August 2019; 12:00		(15–10)		Salle Ibrahim Zahar, Casablanca
26 August 2019; 12:00		Report		Salle Ibrahim Zahar, Casablanca

== Judo ==
Men

Athlete	Event	Round of 32	Round of 16	Quarterfinals	Semifinals	Repechage	Final / BM	
Athlete	Event	Opposition Result	Opposition Result	Opposition Result	Opposition Result	Opposition Result	Opposition Result	Rank
Salim Rebahi	-60 kg	Bye	Ramadan (CHA); W 100–001 S	Diop (SEN); W 001–000	Dhouibi (TUN); L 001 S–011 S	Did not advance	Agbo (NGR); W 100–003 S	3rd place, bronze medalist(s)
Boubekeur Rebahi	-66 kg	Ikomo (COD); W 100–000	Kevin (MOZ); W 100–000	Ismael (NIG); W 100–001 S	Boushita (MAR); L 000–100	Did not advance	Mung'andu (ZAM); W 100–001 S	3rd place, bronze medalist(s)
Wail Ezzine	-66 kg	Bye	Begue (MRI); W 010–000	Mabulu (RSA); W 100–000	Abdelmawgoud (EGY); W 012 S–000	Did not advance	Boushita (MAR); W 012 S–000	1st place, gold medalist(s)
Réda Bougueroua	-73 kg	Mwango (ZAM); W 100–000	El Meziati (MAR); L 001 S–100	Did not advance				
Imad Eddine Cherouk	-81 kg	Bye	Kaswanga (ZAM); W 100–001 S	Moutti (MAR); L 003 S–100	Did not advance	Ranaivoarisoa (MAD); W 100–003 S	Koamba (GAB); W 012 S–000	3rd place, bronze medalist(s)
Abderrahim Bouchoukh	-90 kg	Bye	Chakiri (MAR); W 100–001 S	Dolassem (CMR); L 003 S–100	Did not advance	Malot (CAF); W 011 S–001 S	Feuillet (MRI); L 000–100	4
Houari Belhadeuf	-100 kg	—N/a	Bye		Lahboub (MAR); L 002 S–100	Did not advance	Kosi Samuzu (COD)	4
Mohamed El Mehdi Lili	+100 kg	—N/a	Bye	Perrine (MRI); W 100–000	Ndiaye (SEN); L 002 S–012 S	Did not advance	Jaballah (TUN)	4
Mohamed Sofiane Belrekaa	+100 kg	—N/a	Bye	Hajji (MAR); W 100–000	Elnaggar (EGY); W 100–001 S	Did not advance	Ndiaye (SEN); L 000–100	2nd place, silver medalist(s)

Women

Athlete	Event	Round of 32	Round of 16	Quarterfinals	Semifinals	Repechage	Final / BM	
Athlete	Event	Opposition Result	Opposition Result	Opposition Result	Opposition Result	Opposition Result	Opposition Result	Rank
Hadjer Mecerem	-48 kg	Bye		Diarrassouba (CIV); W 100–000	Whitebooi (RSA); L 001 S–011 S	Did not advance	Joceline (CMR); W 100–012 S	3rd place, bronze medalist(s)
Meriem Moussa	-52 kg	Bye		Adam (EGY); W 100–001 S	Aissahine (ALG); L 003 S–100	Did not advance	Tieffenbach (MAD); W 100–000	3rd place, bronze medalist(s)
Faïza Aissahine	-52 kg	Bye	Taukobong (BOT); W 100–000	Eddinari (MAR); W 100–003 S	Moussa (ALG); W 100–003 S	Did not advance	Iraoui (MAR); W 100–001 S	1st place, gold medalist(s)
Yamina Halata	-57 kg	Bye		Soko (ZAM); W 100–011 S	Alzenan (EGY); W 100–000	Did not advance	Khelifi (TUN); L 002 S–100	2nd place, silver medalist(s)
Imene Agouar	-63 kg	Bye		Memunatu (NIG); W 100–000	Helene (CMR); L 012 S–010 S	Jean Pierre (MRI); W 100–000	Bjaoui (TUN); L 001 S–100	4
Amina Belkadi	-63 kg	Bye		Razafy (MAD); W 011 S–002 S	Bjaoui (TUN); W 012 S–001 S	Did not advance	Helene (CMR); L 002 S–100	2nd place, silver medalist(s)
Souad Bellakehal	-70 kg	—N/a	Bye	Hajanirina Zo (MAD); W 011 S–002 S	Agono (GAB); L 002 S–012 S	Did not advance	Memneloum (CHA); L 000–100	4
Kaouthar Ouallal	-78 kg	—N/a	Bye	Chakir (MAR); W 100–001 S	Mazouz (GAB); L 000–100	Did not advance	Hamed (EGY); W 100–002 S	3rd place, bronze medalist(s)
Sonia Asselah	+78 kg	—N/a	Bye	Elshazly (EGY); L 003 S–100	Did not advance	Sagna (SEN); L 003 S–100	Did not advance	

== Karate ==
Algeria competed in karate and the country finished 3rd in the karate medal table.

== Rowing ==
Algeria is scheduled to compete in Rowing with 4 (2 men and 2 Women).

Athlete	Event	Heats		Repechage		Final	
Athlete	Event	Time	Rank	Time	Rank	Time	Rank
Sid Ali Boudina	LW Men's Single Sculls 1000 m	3:28.96	1 FA	—N/a		3:30.82	1st place, gold medalist(s)
Nawel Chiali	Women's Single sculls 1000 m	3:59.80	1 FA	—N/a		3:56.62	1st place, gold medalist(s)
Oussama Habiche	Men's Single Sculls 1000 m	3:32.39	1 FA	—N/a		3:31.63	3rd place, bronze medalist(s)
Amina Rouba	LW Women's Single Sculls 1000 m	3:55.23	2 FA	—N/a		3:55.01	1st place, gold medalist(s)
Nawel Chiali	Women's Single Sculls 500m	1:55.99	2 FA	—N/a		1:47.28	1st place, gold medalist(s)
Oussama Habiche	Men's Single Sculls 500m	1:38.10	2 FA	—N/a		1:35.89	3rd place, bronze medalist(s)
Amina Rouba	LW Women's Single Sculls 500m	1:49.68	1 FA	—N/a		1:44.54	1st place, gold medalist(s)
Sid Ali Boudina	LW Men's Single Sculls 500m	1:38.74	1 FA	—N/a		1:34.08	2nd place, silver medalist(s)
Kamel Aït Daoud; Nihad Benchadli	Relay 2 × 500 metres single sculls	3:31.02	2	3:28.11	1 FB	3:56.79	3rd place, bronze medalist(s)

Qualification Legend: FA=Final A (medal); FB=Final B (non-medal); R=Repechage

== Shooting ==
Algeria competed in shooting with 14 (9 men and 5 Women). In total sport shooters representing Algeria won one bronze medal and the country finished in 4th place in the shooting medal table.

== Swimming ==
Men

Athlete	Event	Heat		Final	
Athlete	Event	Time	Rank	Time	Rank
Mehdi Nazim Benbara	50m freestyle	23.13	2 Q	23.14	7
Oussama Sahnoune	50m freestyle	22.67	1 Q	22.19	2nd place, silver medalist(s)
Mehdi Nazim Benbara	100m freestyle	51.55	2 Q	51.61	8
Oussama Sahnoune	100m freestyle	50:94	2 Q	48.97 GR	1st place, gold medalist(s)
Mohamed Anisse Djaballah	200m freestyle	1:53.62	2 Q	1:53.12	7
Moncef Aymen Balamane	50m breaststroke	29:06	4	—N/a	
Ramzi Chouchar	50m breaststroke	30:38	6	—N/a	
Moncef Aymen Balamane	200m breaststroke	2:19.57	3 Q	2:18.20	6
Ramzi Chouchar	200m breaststroke	2:20.07	4 Q	2:18.65	7
Moncef Aymen Balamane	100m breatstroke	1:03.59	3 Q	1:03.44	9
Abdellah Ardjoune	50m backstroke	25.88	1 Q	25.61	2nd place, silver medalist(s)
Mohamed Ryad Bouhamdi	50m backstroke	26.46	2 Q	26.67	5
Mohamed Ryad Bouhamdi	100m backstroke	58.65	2 Q	57.12	5
Abdellah Ardjoune	100m backstroke	56.77	2 Q	55.02 GR	1st place, gold medalist(s)
Mohamed Ryad Bouhamdi	200m backstroke	2:07.04	2 Q	2:07.04	6
Abdellah Ardjoune	200m backstroke	2:02.73	2 Q	2:02.73	2nd place, silver medalist(s)
Jaouad Syoud	100m butterfly	54.39	1 Q	53.95	4
Jaouad Syoud	200m butterfly	2:01.72	1 Q	2:01.01	1st place, gold medalist(s)
Lounis Khendriche	200m butterfly	2:04.30	4	2:02.49	2nd place, silver medalist(s)
Ramzi Chouchar	200m Individual Medley	2:08.13	2 Q	2:06.32	6
Jaouad Syoud	200m Individual Medley	2:07.58	1 Q	2:02.49	1st place, gold medalist(s)
Ramzi Chouchar	400m Individual Medley	—N/a		4:23.53	1st place, gold medalist(s)
Jaouad Syoud	400m Individual Medley	—N/a		4:31.55	5
Mohamed Anisse Djaballah	1500m freestyle	—N/a		15:48.50	4
Lounis Khendriche	1500m freestyle	—N/a		DNS	
Jaouad Syoud; Abdellah Ardjoune; Oussama Sahnoune; Moncef Aymen Balamane	4x100m Medley Relay	—N/a		3:43.47	3rd place, bronze medalist(s)
Jaouad Syoud; Ramzi Chouchar; Lounis Khendriche; Moncef Aymen Balamane	4x200m freestyle	—N/a		7:41.49	3rd place, bronze medalist(s)

Qualification Legend: FA=Final A (medal); FB=Final B (non-medal)

Women

Athlete	Event	Heat		Final	
Athlete	Event	Time	Rank	Time	Rank
Amel Melih	50m freestyle	26.03	2 Q	25.86	4
Amel Melih	50m butterfly	27.59	1 Q	27.41	4
Amel Melih	100m freestyle	57.70	2 Q	57.14	4
Majda Chebaraka	200m freestyle	2:07.38	2 Q	2:05.51	3rd place, bronze medalist(s)
Majda Chebaraka	400m freestyle	—N/a		4:24.60	3rd place, bronze medalist(s)
Majda Chebaraka	800m freestyle	—N/a		9:07.21	3rd place, bronze medalist(s)
Rania Hamida Nefsi	200m butterfly	2:21:69	1 Q	2:20.33	2nd place, silver medalist(s)
Amel Melih	50m backstroke	29.62	1 Q	29.93	6
Sara Ain Elhayet El Tahawi	50m backstroke	29.77	3 Q	31.37	8
Sara Ain Elhayet El Tahawi	100m backstroke	1:07.21	3 Q	1:07.37	7
Sara Ain Elhayet El Tahawi	200m backstroke	—N/a		2:24.43	5
Rania Hamida Nefsi	200m Individual Medley	2:24.89	2 Q	2:20.57	2nd place, silver medalist(s)
Rania Hamida Nefsi	400m Individual Medley	—N/a		4:58.55	2nd place, silver medalist(s)
Amel Melih; Rania Hamida Nefsi; Majda Chebaraka; Souad Nafissa Cherouati	4x100m freestyle	3:58.96	3	3:58.28	3rd place, bronze medalist(s)
Sara Ain Elhayet El Tahawi; Souad Nafissa Cherouati; Amel Melih; Rania Hamida Nefsi	4x100m Medley Relay	—N/a		4:22.89	3rd place, bronze medalist(s)
Majda Chebaraka; Souad Nafissa Cherouati; Amel Melih; Rania Hamida Nefsi	4x200m freestyle	—N/a		8:42.75	3rd place, bronze medalist(s)

Qualification Legend: FA=Final A (medal); FB=Final B (non-medal)

Mixed

Athlete	Event	Heat		Final	
Athlete	Event	Time	Rank	Time	Rank
Oussama Sahnoune; Amel Melih; Majda Chebaraka; Mehdi Nazim Benbara	4x100m Free Relay Mixed	3:51.71	2 Q	3:39.82	3rd place, bronze medalist(s)

Qualification Legend: FA=Final A (medal); FB=Final B (non-medal)

== Table tennis ==
Algeria competed in table tennis with 8 (4 men and 4 Women).

Athlete	Event	Round of 16	Quarterfinals	Semifinals	Final	
Athlete	Event	Opposition Result	Opposition Result	Opposition Result	Opposition Result	Rank
[[]]	Men's singles					
[[]] [[]]	Men's Doubles					
[[]]	Women's Singles					
[[]] [[]]	Women's Doubles					
Larbi Bouriah; Sami Kherouf; Mohamed Sofiene Boudjadja	Men's Team	Pool D Aden – Habteyes – Dufera (ETH); W 3 – 0 Sow – Gueye (SEN); L 2 – 3	Did not advance			
Hiba Feredj; Katia Kessaci; Lynda Loghraibi	Women's Team	Pool C Monga – Akemba – Kindandi (COD); W 3 – 0 Hosenally – Kinoo – Jalim (MRI); W 3 – 0	Nejdanova Ira – Jolie – Roseline (CGO); W 3 – 0	Helmy – Meshref – Farah Abdelaziz (EGY); L 0 – 3	Garci – Baklouti – Saidani (TUN); W 3 – 1	3rd place, bronze medalist(s)
[[]] [[]]	Mixed Doubles					

== Taekwondo ==
Athlete	Event	Round of 32	Round of 16	Quarterfinals	Semifinals	Final	
Athlete	Event	Opposition Result	Opposition Result	Opposition Result	Opposition Result	Opposition Result	Rank
Mohamed Guerfi	Men's –58 kg	Bye	Frederic (CMR); W 25–17	Neffati (TUN); L 6–25	Did not advance		
Sofiane Djeddou	Men's –68 kg	Elwafi (LBA); L 8–11	Did not advance				
Lyes Ouchaoua	Men's –74 kg	—N/a	Samothsozo (BOT); L 14–24	Did not advance			
Islam Guetfaya	Men's –80 kg	—N/a	Silvere (CMR); W 27–11	Mahboubi (MAR); L 10–20	Did not advance		
Aicha Mehdi	Women's –49 kg	—N/a	Diallo (GUI); L 15–20	Did not advance			
Thanina Medouni	Women's –57 kg	—N/a	Amina (CHA); W 12–6	Laaraj (MAR); L 1–13	Did not advance		
Wafaa Remaoun	Women's –62 kg	—N/a	Bye	Ibo (CIV); L 8–18	Did not advance		
Djamila Achouak Boudra	Women's –67 kg	—N/a		Expitini (CIV); L 12–15	Did not advance		
Racha Atmani	Women's –73 kg	—N/a	Oloo (KEN); L 5–7	Did not advance			
Linda Azzeddine	Women's +73 kg	—N/a	Bye	Ogallo (KEN); L 4–13	Did not advance		

== Volleyball ==
Algeria women's national volleyball team is scheduled to compete in the 2019 African Games. The men's team is also scheduled to compete.

=== Beach ===
==== Pool C ====
Pos	Team	Pld	W	L	Pts	SW	SL	SR	SPW	SPL	SPR
1	(Rwanda) Ntagengwa–Kavalo	3	3	0	6	6	1	6.000	140	107	1.308
2	(Angola) Sequeira–Figueiredo	3	2	1	5	5	3	1.667	162	137	1.182
3	(Algeria) Farouk–Mohamed-Islem	3	1	2	4	3	4	0.750	128	149	0.859
4	(Benin) Tamou–Tohouegnon	3	0	3	3	0	6	0.000	93	130	0.715

Athlete	Event	Preliminary round	Standing	Quarterfinals	Semifinals	Final / BM	
Athlete	Event	Opposition Score	Standing	Opposition Score	Opposition Score	Opposition Score	Rank
Mohamed Islem Kallouche; Farouk Tizit	Men's	Pool C Tamou – Goudjo (BEN); W 2 – 0 (25–23, 21–19); Kavalo – Ntagengwa (RWA); L 0 – 2 (13–21, 12–21); Figueiredo – Sequeira (ANG); L 1 – 2 (25–23, 13–21, 19–21)	3	Did not advance			
Salima Bechar; Melissa Souami	Women's	Pool C Mukandayisenga – Munezero (RWA); L 0 – 2 (17–21, 13–21); Gasa – Guyo (ZIM); W 2 – 0 (21–19, 21–14); Bonne – Cousin (MRI); L 1 – 2 (21–18, 14–21, 10–15)	3	Did not advance			

== Weightlifting ==
Algeria competed in weightlifting.

In total weightlifters representing Algeria won six silver medals and nine bronze medals.

== Wrestling ==
Algeria competed in wrestling with 15 (11 men and 4 Women).

Men's Freestyle

Athlete	Event	Round of 16	Quarterfinal	Semifinal	Repechage 1	Final / BM	
Athlete	Event	Opposition Result	Opposition Result	Opposition Result	Opposition Result	Opposition Result	Rank
Abdelhak Kherbache	−57 kg	—N/a					
Mohamed Al-Amine Lakel	−65 kg	—N/a					
Ishak Boukhors	−74 kg	—N/a					
Fateh Benferdjallah	−86 kg	—N/a					
Mohamed Fardj	−92 kg	—N/a					

Women's Freestyle

Athlete	Event	Round of 16	Quarterfinal	Semifinal	Repechage	Final / BM	
Athlete	Event	Opposition Result	Opposition Result	Opposition Result	Opposition Result	Opposition Result	Rank
Ibtissem Doudou	−50 kg	—N/a					
Lamia Chemlal	−53 kg	—N/a					
Rayane Houfaf	−57 kg	—N/a					
Amel Hammiche	−68 kg	—N/a					

Men's Greco-Roman

Athlete	Event	Round of 16	Quarterfinal	Semifinal	Repechage	Final / BM	
Athlete	Event	Opposition Result	Opposition Result	Opposition Result	Opposition Result	Opposition Result	Rank
Abdennour Laouni	−60 kg	—N/a					3rd place, bronze medalist(s)
Abdelmalek Merabet	−67 kg	—N/a					3rd place, bronze medalist(s)
Abdelkrim Ouakali	−77 kg	—N/a					1st place, gold medalist(s)
Bachir Sid Azara	−87 kg	—N/a					1st place, gold medalist(s)
Adem Boudjemline	−97 kg	—N/a					1st place, gold medalist(s)
Hamza Haloui	−130 kg	—N/a					3rd place, bronze medalist(s)
