= Seychelles at the 2019 African Games =

- Flag of Seychelles
- IOC code: SEY
- NOC: Seychelles Olympic and Commonwealth Games Association

in Rabat, Morocco 19 August 2019 – 31 August 2019
- Competitors: 40 (21 men and 19 women) in 7 sports
- Flag bearer: Felicity Passon
- Medals Ranked 18th: Gold 2 Silver 1 Bronze 1 Total 4

African Games appearances
- 1987; 1991; 1995; 1999; 2003; 2007; 2011; 2015; 2019; 2023

Seychelles competed at the 2019 African Games held from 19 to 31 August 2019 in Rabat, Morocco. In total, athletes representing Seychelles won one gold medal, one silver medal and two bronze medals and the country finished 18th in the medal table. All medals were won in swimming by Felicity Passon. Passon also served as flag bearer at the opening ceremony of the 2019 African Games.

== Medal summary ==
=== Medal table ===
Medal	Name	Sport	Event	Date
Gold	Felicity Passon	Swimming	Women's 200 m backstroke	21 August
Gold	Felicity Passon	Swimming	Women's 100 m backstroke	24 August
Silver	Felicity Passon	Swimming	Women's 50 m backstroke	23 August
Bronze	Felicity Passon	Swimming	Women's 100 m butterfly	23 August

Medals by sport
Sport	1st place, gold medalist(s)	2nd place, silver medalist(s)	3rd place, bronze medalist(s)	Total
Swimming	2	1	1	4
Total	2	1	1	4

== Athletics ==
Eight athletes were scheduled to compete in athletics: Ned Justeen Azemia, Stefano Bibi, Norris Brioche, Natasha Chetty, Sharry Dodin, Leeroy Henriette, Iven Moise and Dylan Sicobo.

Sharry Dodin, Dylan Sicobo and Leeroy Henriette competed in the men's 100 metres. Dodin and Henriette were also scheduled to compete in the men's 200 metres event but they did not start.

Stefano Bibi competed in the men's 400 metres event and he did not advance to the semifinals.

Ned Justeen Azemia competed in the men's 400 metres hurdles event and he did not advance to compete in the final.

Iven Moise competed in the men's 5000 metres event and he finished in 25th place.

Natasha Chetty competed in the women's high jump event. She finished in a shared 9th place with Basant Hassan (representing Egypt).

Norris Brioche competed in the men's high jump event. He finished in a shared 8th place with Mieguery Kwenda and Mohamed Younes Idris.

== Badminton ==
Allisen Camille competed in badminton in the women's singles event. She was eliminated in the first round.

== Boxing ==
Three athletes competed in boxing: Andrick Allisop (men's 63kg), Shain Barnsley Boniface (men's 69kg) and Jovet Nicol Jean (men's 81kg).

All three competed in one match and all three did not advance to the next round.

== Canoeing ==
Tony Lespoir competed in canoeing. He competed in the Men's K1 200 metres event and he finished 4th in the semi-finals.

== Judo ==
Derick Croisee (men's −81 kg), Dominic Dugasse (men's −100 kg) and Nantenaina Finesse (men's −90 kg) represented Seychelles in judo.

== Swimming ==
Five swimmers represented Seychelles in swimming: Mathieu Bachmann, Simon Bachmann, Khema Elizabeth, Felicity Passon and Samuele Rossi.

Felicity Passon won two gold medals, one silver medal and one bronze medal - these are also all medals won by athletes representing Seychelles at the 2019 African Games.

== Volleyball ==
Seychelles competed in the women's tournament. The women's team lost two out of three games and did not advance to the semi-finals.

== Weightlifting ==
Steven Baccus, Clementina Agricole, Rick Confiance and Chakira Mary Rose were scheduled to compete in weightlifting. Baccus and Rose did not compete in their events.

Agricole competed in the women's 59 kg events and Confiance competed in the men's 73 kg events.
