= Adrian Robinson (swimmer) =

Botswana swimmer (born 2000)

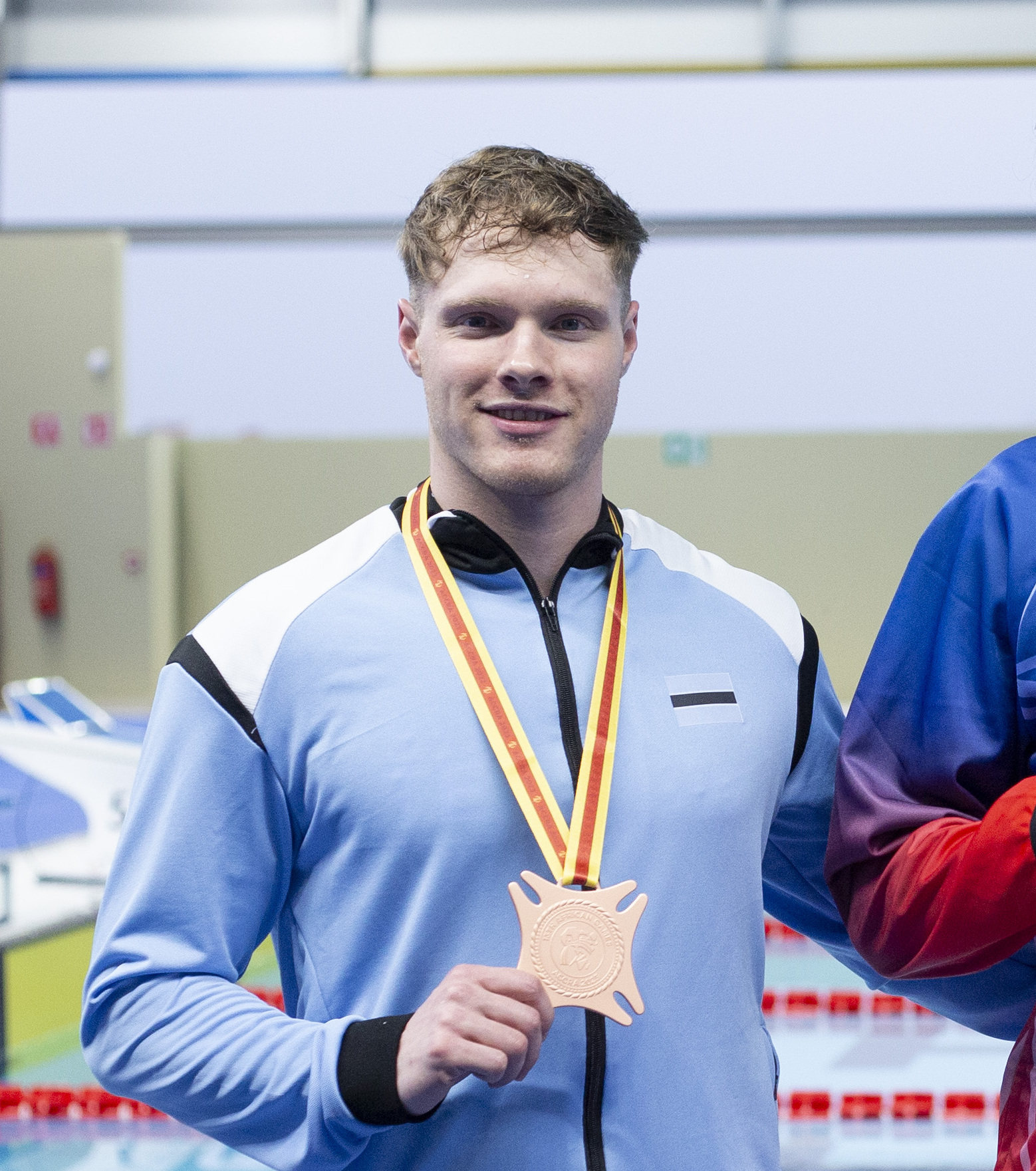
- 2023 African Games

Personal information
- Born: 11 April 2000 (age 26)

Sport
- Sport: Swimming
Medal record
Men's swimming
Representing Botswana
African Games
Bronze medal – third place	2023 Accra	50 m breaststroke
Bronze medal – third place	2023 Accra	100 m breaststroke

Adrian Robinson (born 11 April 2000) is a Botswana swimmer.

== Career ==
Robinson born in Botswana, before moving to Canada at 10 where he started taking swimming seriously, then South Africa for high school. He competed in the men's 50 metre breaststroke event at the 2017 World Aquatics Championships. In 2019, he represented Botswana at the 2019 African Games held in Rabat, Morocco.
