= Morocco at the 2019 African Games =

- Flag of Morocco
- IOC code: MAR
- NOC: Moroccan Olympic Committee

in Rabat, Morocco 19 August 2019 – 31 August 2019
- Competitors: 409 (228 men and 181 women)
- Medals Ranked 5th: Gold 31 Silver 32 Bronze 55 Total 118

African Games appearances (overview)
- 1973; 1978; 1987–2015; 2019; 2023

Morocco competed at the 2019 African Games held from 19 to 31 August 2019 in Rabat, Morocco. This was the first time that Morocco hosted the competition. It was also the first time since the 1978 All-Africa Games that Morocco took part in the competition after being banned. In total, athletes representing Morocco won 31 gold medals, 32 silver medals, and 46 bronze medals and the country finished in 5th place in the medal table.

== Medal summary ==
=== Medal table ===
Medal	Name	Sport	Event	Date
Gold	Issam Bassou	Judo	Men's -60 kg	17 August
Gold	Chaimae Eddinari	Judo	Women's -48 kg	17 August
Gold	Badr Siwane	Triathlon	Men's event	24 August
Gold	Mohamed Hamout	Boxing	Men's featherweight (57 kg)	29 August
Gold	Abdelhaq Nadir	Boxing	Men's lightweight (63 kg)	29 August
Gold	Tarik Allali	Boxing	Men's middleweight (75 kg)	29 August
Gold	Khadija El-Mardi	Boxing	Women's middleweight (75 kg)	29 August
Silver	Abderrahmane Boushita	Judo	Men's -66 kg	17 August
Silver	Ahmed El Meziati	Judo	Men's -73 kg	17 August
Silver	Hamza Kabdani	Judo	Men's -81 kg	17 August
Silver	Soumiya Iraoui	Judo	Women's -52 kg	17 August
Silver	Hamza Kabdani	Judo	Men's -81 kg	18 August
Silver	Mohammed El Mehdi Essadiq	Triathlon	Men's event	24 August
Bronze	Younes Saddiki	Judo	Men's -60 kg	17 August
Bronze	Lamiae Eddinari	Judo	Women's -52 kg	17 August
Bronze	Aziza Chakir	Judo	Women's -48 kg	17 August
Bronze	Sofia Belattar	Judo	Women's -63 kg	17 August
Bronze	Morocco	Swimming	Men's 4 × 100 m freestyle relay	21 August
Bronze	Morocco	Swimming	4 × 100 m medley relay mixed	22 August
Bronze	Sarah Juliette Saidi Fraincart	Rowing	Women's single sculls 500 metres	22 August
Bronze	Yusuf Tibazi	Swimming	Men's 100 m butterfly	23 August
Bronze	Yusuf Tibazi	Swimming	Men's 50 m backstroke	23 August
Bronze	Oumayma Bel Ahbib	Boxing	Women's welterweight (69 kg)	28 August

Medals by sport
Sport	1st place, gold medalist(s)	2nd place, silver medalist(s)	3rd place, bronze medalist(s)	Total
Athletics	0	6	5	11
Boxing	4	2	1	7
Canoeing	1	0	1	2
Cycling	0	0	1	1
Equestrian	2	1	1	4
Fencing	1	2	4	7
Football	0	0	1	1
Gymnastics	0	0	2	2
Handball	0	0	1	1
Karate	9	4	2	15
Judo	2	5	4	11
Rowing	0	0	1	1
Shooting	2	3	2	7
Snooker	3	1	2	6
Swimming	0	0	4	4
Taekwondo	5	2	4	11
Tennis	1	2	2	5
Triathlon	1	1	0	2
Volleyball	0	1	1	2
Weightlifting	0	1	13	14
Wrestling	0	1	3	4
Total	31	32	55	118

Medals by date
Day	Date	1st place, gold medalist(s)	2nd place, silver medalist(s)	3rd place, bronze medalist(s)	Total
1	16 August	0	0	0	0
2	17 August	2	4	4	10
3	18 August	0	1	0	1
6	21 August	0	0	1	1
7	22 August	0	0	2	2
8	23 August	0	0	2	2
9	24 August	1	1	0	2
Total		3	6	9	18

== Archery ==
Omar El Boussouni, Ismail Elalaoui, Mohamed Jelloun, Malak Charif, Loubna Farfra and Maryem Zamkhakh competed in archery. They did not win any medals.

== Athletics ==
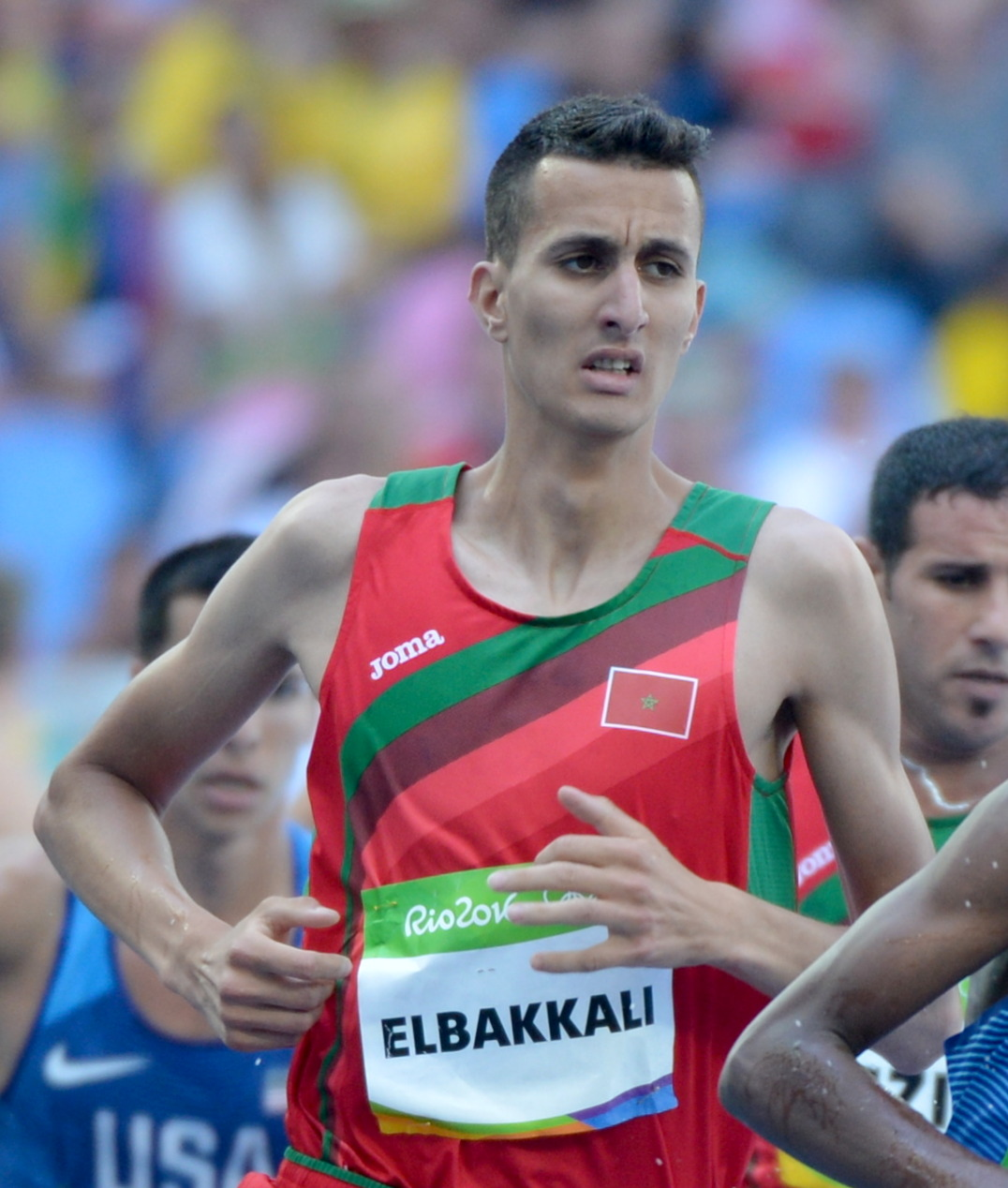
Soufiane El Bakkali (2016)

Athletes representing Morocco in athletics won six silver medals and five bronze medals and the country finished in 14th place in the athletics medal table.

Mohamed Reda El Aaraby won the silver medal in the men's half marathon and Hamza Sahli won the bronze medal in that event.

Marouane Kacimi won the silver medal in the men's long jump event.

Oussama Nabil won the bronze medal in the men's 800 metres event.

Soufiane El Bakkali won the bronze medal in the men's 3000 metres steeplechase event.

Elbachir Mbarki won the bronze medal in the men's discus throw event.

Marouane Kacimi won the bronze medal in the men's decathlon.

== Badminton ==
Morocco competed in badminton. No medals were won.

== Boxing ==
Morocco competed in boxing and, in total, four gold medals, two silver medals and one bronze medal were won. The country finished 1st in the boxing medal table.

== Canoeing ==
Laila Bouchir and Chaymaa Guemra won the gold medal in the women's K-2 200 metres event.

Bouchir and Guemra also competed in the women's K-4 500 metres event together with Zina Aboudalal and Salma Khabot and they won the bronze medal.

== Chess ==
Hicham Hamdouchi, Mohamed Tissir, Firdaous Mayar El Idrissi and Rania Sbai are scheduled to compete in chess.

== Equestrian ==
Morocco competed in equestrian and won two gold medals, one silver medal and one bronze medal.

In the team jumping event Morocco won the gold medal.

In the individual jumping event all medals went to equestrians representing Morocco: El Ghali Boukaa won the gold medal, Abdelkebir Ouaddar won the silver medal and Vincent Zacharias Bourguignon won the bronze medal.

== Fencing ==
Morocco competed in fencing. Fencers representing Morocco won one gold medal, two silver medals and four bronze medals. The country finished third in the fencing medal table.

== Football ==
Morocco competed in both the men's tournament and women's tournament.

The men's team competed in the group stage and did not advance to the semi-finals.

The women's team won the bronze medal in their tournament.

== Gymnastics ==
Morocco competed in gymnastics.

In total, two medals were won: the bronze medal in the men's team all-around event and Nabil Zouhair won the bronze medal in the men's floor exercise event.

== Handball ==
Both Morocco's national handball team and women's national football team competed in handball.

The men's team won the bronze medal in the men's tournament.

The women's team reached the quarterfinals.

== Judo ==
Men

- –60 kg: (gold) Issam Bassou
- –60 kg: (bronze) Younes Saddiki
- –66 kg: (silver) Abderrahmane Boushita
- –73 kg: (silver) Hamza Kabdani
- –100 kg: (silver) Mohammed Lahboub

Women

- –48 kg: (gold) Chaimae Eddinari
- –52 kg: (silver) Soumiya Iraoui
- –52 kg: (bronze) Lamia Eddinari
- –63 kg: (bronze) Sofia Belattar

== Karate ==
Morocco competed in karate. In total, athletes representing Morocco won nine gold medals, four silver medals and two bronze medals and the country finished 1st in the karate medal table.

== Rowing ==
Abdeslam Assermouh, Hicham Benabdallah, Manal Chaffoui, Achraf El Alami, Majdouline El Allaoui, Abdelhak Ellamman and Sarah Juliette Saidi Fraincart are scheduled to compete in rowing.

== Shooting ==
Morocco competed in shooting. In total, athletes representing Morocco won two gold medals, three silver medals and two bronze medals and the country finished 2nd in the shooting medal table.

== Snooker ==
Amine Amiri, Yassine Bellamine, Hakima Kissai and Youssra Matine competed in snooker. In total, they won three gold medals, one silver medal and two bronze medals.

== Swimming ==
Swimmers representing Morocco won four bronze medals in total.

Driss Lahrichi won the bronze medal in the men's 50 metre backstroke event.

Yusuf Tibazi won the bronze medal in the men's 100 metre butterfly event.

Souhail Hamouchane, Driss Lahrichi, Merwane El Merini and Samy Boutouil won the bronze medal in the men's 4 × 100 metre freestyle relay event.

Driss Lahrichi, Hiba Laknit, Yusuf Tibazi, Noura Mana, Adil Assouab and Samy Boutouil won the bronze medal in the 4 × 100 metre mixed medley relay event.

== Table tennis ==
Morocco competed in table tennis.

== Taekwondo ==
In total, five gold medals, two silver medals and four bronze medals were won in Taekwondo and Morocco finished in 1st place in the Taekwondo medal table.

== Tennis ==
Morocco competed in tennis. Tennis players representing Morocco won one gold medal, two silver medals and two bronze medals.

== Triathlon ==
Badr Siwane won the gold medal in the men's event and Mohammed El Mehdi Essadiq won the silver medal in that event.

Nabil Kouzkouz also competed in the men's event. He finished in 5th place.

Karima Kanoun, Samia M'Safer and Oumaima El Atrassi also competed in the women's event. They finished in 8th, 12th and 13th place respectively.

In the mixed relay event Morocco finished in 4th place.

== Volleyball ==
Morocco men's national volleyball team competed in the men's tournament.

The women's national volleyball team won the bronze medal in the women's tournament.

== Weightlifting ==
Morocco competed in weightlifting and won one silver medal and four bronze medals.

Issam Harfi won the silver medal in the men's 55 kg Snatch event. He also won the bronze medals in the 55 kg Clean & jerk and 55 kg Total events.

Mohamed Moulabbi won the bronze medal in the men's 67 kg Clean & jerk event and the 67 kg Total event.

== Wrestling ==
Ten athletes represented Morocco in wrestling.

Key:

- VT – Victory by fall.
- PP – Decision by points – the loser with technical points.
- PO – Decision by points – the loser without technical points.
- ST – Great superiority – the loser without technical points and a margin of victory of at least 8 (Greco-Roman) or 10 (freestyle) points.
- SP – Technical superiority – the loser with technical points and a margin of victory of at least 8 (Greco-Roman) or 10 (freestyle) points.
- IN - Victory by injury - the loser is injured before or during a bout.
- FO - Victory by forfeit - the loser is forfeit a bout.

Men's freestyle

Athlete	Event	Qualification	Quarterfinal	Semifinal	Repechage 1	Final / BM	
Athlete	Event	Opposition Result	Opposition Result	Opposition Result	Opposition Result	Opposition Result	Rank
Chakir Ansari	−57 kg	R Meunier (MRI); W 12–2 ^{SP}	B Andriamalala (MAD); W 12–1 ^{SP}	E Welson (NGR); L 10–12 ^{PP}	Bye	K Vleermuis (NAM); W 10–0 ^{ST}	3rd place, bronze medalist(s)
Otmane El Bahja	−65 kg	AR Hussen (EGY); L 7–12 ^{PP}	Did not advance				10
Rabii Regani	−74 kg	J Marianne (MRI); W 10–0 ^{ST}	O John (NGR); L 0–10 ^{ST}	Did not advance	J Diatta (SEN); L 2–13 ^{SP}	Did not advance	8
Oussama Regani	−86 kg	U Manouan (CIV); W 9–2 ^{PP}	A Barraj (TUN); L 2–13 ^{SP}	Did not advance	K El-Moatamadawi (EGY); L 0–10 ^{ST}	Did not advance	8
Fahd Naji	−97 kg	Bye	J Folane (BUR); W 19–8 ^{SP}	S Tamarau (NGR); L 0–8 ^{VT}	Bye	M Fardj (ALG); L 0–10 ^{ST}	5
Athlete	Event	Group stages		Semifinal	Bronze medal bout	Final	
Athlete	Event	Opposition Result	Standing	Opposition Result	Opposition Result	Opposition Result	Rank
Anas Lamkabber	−125 kg	Group A A Tangara (CIV): W 13–2 ^{SP} A Guennichi (TUN): W 0–0 ^{FO} R Mabuba (COD): W 11–1 ^{SP}	1	S Boltic (NGR); L 0–0 ^{IN}	R Mabuba (COD); W 9–2 ^{PP}	Did not advance	3rd place, bronze medalist(s)

Men's Greco-Roman

Athlete	Event	Qualification	Quarterfinal	Semifinal	Repechage 1	Final / BM	
Athlete	Event	Opposition Result	Opposition Result	Opposition Result	Opposition Result	Opposition Result	Rank
Reda Moueniss	−87 kg	S Bouba (CHA); W 7–0 ^{VT}	B Sid Azara (ALG); L 0–8 ^{ST}	Did not advance	T Okeke (NGR); L 1–2 ^{PP}	Did not advance	7
Athlete	Event	Group stages		Semifinal	Bronze medal bout	Final	
Athlete	Event	Opposition Result	Standing	Opposition Result	Opposition Result	Opposition Result	Rank
Fouad Fajari	−60 kg	Group B H Mahmoud (EGY): L 1–3 ^{PP} K Koech (KEN): W 6–0 ^{VT}	2	A Laouni (ALG); W 3–1 ^{PP}	Bye	H Mahmoud (EGY); L 1–1 ^{PP}	2nd place, silver medalist(s)
Aziz Boualem	−67 kg	Group A M Elsayed (EGY): L 0–10 ^{ST} E Djekoundakom (CHA): L 0–0 ^{IN} A Merabet (ALG): L 0–0 ^{IN}	4	Did not advance			6
Zied Ait Ouagram	−77 kg	Group A AE Ouakali (ALG): L 2–4 ^{PP} R Wina (COD): W 7–1 ^{PP}	2	MZ Khalil (EGY); L 4–5 ^{PP}	E Nworie (NGR); W 12–2 ^{SP}	Did not advance	3rd place, bronze medalist(s)
Anas Lamkabber	−130 kg	Group A A Mohamed (EGY): L 0–8 ^{ST} D Malick (CHA): W 9–0 ^{ST} H Haloui (ALG): L 0–9 ^{ST}	3	Did not advance			5
