= South Africa at the 2019 African Games =

- Flag of South Africa
- IOC code: RSA
- NOC: South African Sports Confederation and Olympic Committee

in Rabat, Morocco 19 August 2019 – 31 August 2019
- Competitors: 153 in 11 sports
- Flag bearer (opening): Geronay Whitebooi
- Flag bearer (closing): Bridgitte Hartley
- Medals Ranked 4th: Gold 36 Silver 26 Bronze 25 Total 87

African Games appearances (overview)
- 1995; 1999; 2003; 2007; 2011; 2015; 2019; 2023

South Africa competed at the 2019 African Games held from 19 to 31 August 2019 in Rabat, Morocco. In total, 153 athletes represented South Africa in 11 sports. Athletes representing South Africa won 36 gold medals, 26 silver medals and 25 bronze medals and the country finished in 3rd place in the medal table.

== Medal summary ==
=== Medal table ===
| Medal | Name | Sport | Event | Date |
|---|---|---|---|---|
| Gold | Michael Houlie | Swimming | Men's 50m Breaststroke | 21 August |
| Gold | Kaylene Corbett | Swimming | Women's 50m Breaststroke | 21 August |
| Gold | Erin Gallagher | Swimming | Women's 100m Freestyle | 21 August |
| Gold | Martin Binedell | Swimming | Men's 200m Backstroke | 21 August |
| Gold | South Africa | Swimming | Men's 4x100m Freestyle | 21 August |
| Gold | South Africa | Swimming | Women's 4x100m Freestyle | 21 August |
| Gold | Tiffany Keep | Cycling | Women’s Cross-Country | 21 August |
| Gold | Alaric Basson | Swimming | Men's 100m Breaststroke | 22 August |
| Gold | Kaylene Corbett | Swimming | Women's 100m Breaststroke | 22 August |
| Gold | Samantha Randle | Swimming | Women's 400m Individual Medley | 22 August |
| Gold | South Africa | Swimming | Women's 4x200m Freestyle Relay | 22 August |
| Gold | South Africa | Swimming | 4x100m Medley Relay Mixed | 22 August |
| Gold | Johanita Scholtz | Badminton | Women's singles | 29 August |
| Gold | Mpho Links | Athletics | Men's high jump | 30 August |
| Gold | Chrisjan Coetzee | Canoeing | Men's K-1 200 metres | 30 August |
| Silver | Geronay Whitebooi | Judo | Women's -48 kg | 17 August |
| Silver | Unelle Snyman | Judo | Women's -78 kg | 18 August |
| Silver | Christin Mundell | Swimming | Women's 50m Breaststroke | 21 August |
| Silver | Samantha Randle | Swimming | Women's 1500m freestyle | 21 August |
| Silver | Samantha Randle | Swimming | Women's 200m backstroke | 21 August |
| Silver | Erin Gallagher | Swimming | Women's 50m Butterfly | 22 August |
| Silver | Christin Mundell | Swimming | Women's 200m Freestyle | 22 August |
| Silver | Christin Mundell | Swimming | Women's 100m Breaststroke | 22 August |
| Silver | Ayrton Sweeney | Swimming | Men's 400m Individual Medley | 22 August |
| Silver | Yolandi Stander | Athletics | Women's discus throw | 26 August |
| Silver | Jo-Ane van Dyk | Athletics | Women's javelin throw | 28 August |
| Silver | Louis Hattingh | Canoeing | Men's K-1 1000 metres | 28 August |
| Silver | Thapelo Phora | Athletics | Men's 400 metres | 28 August |
| Silver | South Africa | Athletics | Women's 4 × 100 metres relay | 28 August |
| Silver | Chanel Simmonds | Tennis | Women's singles | 29 August |
| Silver | South Africa | Athletics | Men's 4 × 400 metres relay | 30 August |
| Silver | Ischke Senekal | Athletics | Women's shot put | 30 August |
| Bronze | Emma Chelius | Swimming | Women's 100m Freestyle | 21 August |
| Bronze | Carla Antonopoulos | Swimming | Women's 1500m freestyle | 21 August |
| Bronze | Ryan Coetzee | Swimming | Men's 50m Butterfly | 22 August |
| Bronze | Emma Chelius | Swimming | Women's 50m Butterfly | 22 August |
| Bronze | Michael Houlie | Swimming | Men's 100m Breaststroke | 22 August |
| Bronze | Jessica Wehlan | Swimming | Women's 400m Individual Medley | 22 August |
| Bronze | Megan de Beer; Johanita Scholtz | Badminton | Women's doubles | 29 August |

Medals by sport
| Sport | 1st place, gold medalist(s) | 2nd place, silver medalist(s) | 3rd place, bronze medalist(s) | Total |
| Athletics | 1 | 6 | 10 | 17 |
| Badminton | 1 | 0 | 2 | 3 |
| Canoeing | 8 | 1 | 1 | 10 |
| Cycling | 6 | 3 | 0 | 9 |
| Judo | 0 | 2 | 0 | 2 |
| Swimming | 20 | 13 | 12 | 45 |
| Tennis | 0 | 1 | 0 | 1 |
| Total | 36 | 26 | 25 | 87 |

Medals by date
| Day | Date | 1st place, gold medalist(s) | 2nd place, silver medalist(s) | 3rd place, bronze medalist(s) | Total |
| 1 | 16 August | 0 | 0 | 0 | 0 |
| 2 | 17 August | 0 | 1 | 0 | 1 |
| 3 | 18 August | 0 | 1 | 0 | 1 |
| 5 | 21 August | 7 | 3 | 2 | 12 |
| 6 | 22 August | 5 | 4 | 4 | 13 |
| 13 | 29 August | 0 | 1 | 0 | 1 |
| Total | | 12 | 10 | 6 | 28 |

== Archery ==
South Africa competed in archery. Morgan Blewett, Vivien De Klerk, Rhyn Potgieter and Catharina Whitehead represented South Africa in archery.

Blewett, De Klerk and Potgieter competed in the men's individual and men's team events. Whitehead competed in the women's individual event. Whitehead and De Klerk also competed in the mixed team event.

== Athletics ==
38 athletes were scheduled to compete in athletes. Antonio Alkana, Lindsay Hanekom, Zenéy van der Walt and Sunette Viljoen were among the athletes to compete in the 2019 African Games.

In total, athletes representing South Africa won one gold medal, six silver medals and ten bronze medals and the country finished in 10th place in the athletics medal table.

== Badminton ==
South Africa competed in badminton with 8 athletes (4 men's and 4 women's).

Johanita Scholtz won the gold medal in the women's singles event.

Megan de Beer and Johanita Scholtz won the bronze medal in the women's doubles event.

In the team event South Africa also won a bronze medal.

== Beach volleyball ==
Grant Goldschmidt and Leo Williams competed in the men's beach volleyball tournament. They finished in 4th place.

== Canoeing ==
Bridgitte Hartley is part of the team to represent South Africa in canoeing at the 2019 African Games.

== Cycling ==
South Africa competed in cycling.

The following athletes represented South Africa in cycling:

- Men: Ryan Gibbons, Stefan de Bod, Jayde Julius, Clint Hendricks, Kent Main, Jason Oosthuizen
- Women: Ashleigh Moolman-Pasio, Maroesjka Matthee, Joanna van de Winkel, Zanri Rossouw, Carla Oberholzer, Tiffany Keep

In total, cyclists representing South Africa won six gold medals and three silver medals and the country finished 1st in the cycling medal table.

== Football ==
South Africa competed in football at the 2019 African Games, both in the men's tournament and the women's tournament.

In both tournaments the teams did not advance from the group stage to the semi-finals. Both the men's team and women's team lost all their matches.

== Judo ==
South Africa competed in judo. In total five athletes represented South Africa in judo.

Two medals were won:

- Women -48kg: (silver) Geronay Whitebooi
- Women -78kg: (silver) Unelle Snyman

== Karate ==
South Africa competed in karate.

== Swimming ==
24 swimmers were scheduled to compete in the 2019 African Games. Michael Houlie represented South Africa at the 2019 African Games.

South Africa finished in 1st place in the swimming medal table with 20 gold medals, 13 silver medals and 12 bronze medals.

== Table tennis ==
South Africa competed in table tennis.

== Tennis ==
Chanel Simmonds was the only player to represent South Africa in tennis at the 2019 African Games. She won the silver medal in the women's singles event.

== Weightlifting ==
Mona Pretorius was one of the weightlifters to represent South Africa at the 2019 African Games.
