= 2018 African Swimming Championships – Men's 50 metre freestyle =

Men's 50 metre freestyle at the 2018 African Swimming Championships
- Venue: Mohamed Boudiaf Olympic Complex
- Dates: 15 September (heats and final)
- Competitors: 47 from 28 nations
- Winning time: 22.51

Medalists
gold medal	Ali Khalafalla	Egypt
silver medal	Bradley Vincent	Mauritius
bronze medal	Abdelrahman Sameh	Egypt

The Men's 50 metre freestyle competition of the 2018 African Swimming Championships was held on 15 September 2018.

== Records ==
Prior to the competition, the existing world and championship records were as follows.

	Name	Nation	Time	Location	Date
World record	César Cielo	Brazil	20.91	São Paulo	18 December 2009
African record	Roland Schoeman	South Africa	21.67	Beijing	16 August 2008
Championship record	Oussama Sahnoune	Algeria	22.39	Bloemfontein	21 October 2016

== Results ==
=== Heats ===
The heats were started on 15 September at 09:40.

Rank	Name	Nationality	Time	Notes
1	Bradley Vincent	Mauritius	23.04	Q
2	Ali Khalafalla	Egypt	23.05	Q
3	Abdelrahman Sameh	Egypt	23.12	Q
4	Yusuf Tibazi	Morocco	23.70	Q
5	Matthew Bowers	South Africa	23.71	Q
6	Souhail Hamouchane	Morocco	23.77	Q
7	Alaric Basson	South Africa	23.81	Q
8	Abeiku Jackson	Ghana	23.84	Q
9	El Hadji Adama Niane	Senegal	23.86	
10	Ralph Goveia	Zambia	24.19	NR
11	Mohamed Ali Chaouchi	Tunisia	24.32	
12	Filipe Gomes	Malawi	24.47	
12	Swaleh Talib	Kenya	24.47	
14	Daniel Francisco	Angola	24.49	
15	Mario Ervedosa	Angola	24.55	
16	Dean Hoffman	Seychelles	24.95	
17	Atuhaire Ambala	Uganda	25.04	
18	Adam Moncherry	Seychelles	25.05	
19	Ovesh Purahoo	Mauritius	25.38	
20	Mohammed Yousuf Bin Mousa	Libya	25.41	
21	Samuel Ndonga	Kenya	25.50	
22	Chase Onorati	Zimbabwe	25.98	
23	Herinirina John Rakotomavo	Madagascar	26.25	
24	Abobakr Fadlalla Abbas	Sudan	26.33	
25	Troy Nestor Pina	Cape Verde	26.36	
26	Adnan Kabuye	Uganda	26.51	
27	Edilson Paco	Mozambique	26.63	
28	Liam Emmett	Eswatini	26.78	
29	Ayaan Chand	Botswana	27.12	
30	Mohamed Aziz Ghaffari	Tunisia	27.37	
31	Sithembiso Mamba	Eswatini	27.42	
32	Maemo Sebikiri	Botswana	27.87	
33	Zinhle Bekker	Botswana	27.88	
34	Jefferson Kpanou	Benin	28.35	
35	Sami Yousif	Sudan	28.47	
36	Houssein Gaber Ibrahim	Djibouti	29.02	
37	Omar Darboe	Gambia	29.12	
38	Abdoul Nignan	Burkina Faso	29.38	
39	David Hillah-Ayite	Togo	30.86	
40	Jegan Jobe	Gambia	30.97	
41	Elom Dossou	Togo	32.23	
42	Jere Gomegzani	Malawi	32.76	
43	Landry Koumondji	Benin	33.13	
	Heriniavo Rasolonjatovo	Madagascar	Did not start	
	Isobo Confidence	Nigeria	Did not start	
	Oduni Chukwuka	Nigeria	Did not start	
	Mamadou Mouctar	Niger	Did not start	

=== Final ===
The final was started on 15 September.

Rank	Lane	Name	Nationality	Time	Notes
1st place, gold medalist(s)	5	Ali Khalafalla	Egypt	22.51	
2nd place, silver medalist(s)	4	Bradley Vincent	Mauritius	22.86	
3rd place, bronze medalist(s)	3	Abdelrahman Sameh	Egypt	23.03	
4	7	Souhail Hamouchane	Morocco	23.40	
5	2	Matthew Bowers	South Africa	23.72	
6	6	Yusuf Tibazi	Morocco	23.75	
7	1	Alaric Basson	South Africa	23.82	
8	8	Abeiku Jackson	Ghana	23.97	
