= 2018 African Swimming Championships – Men's 50 metre butterfly =

Men's competitive sporting event

Men's 50 metre butterfly at the 2018 African Swimming Championships
- Venue: Mohamed Boudiaf Olympic Complex
- Dates: 12 September (heats and final)
- Competitors: 36 from 26 nations
- Winning time: 23.71

Medalists
gold medal	Abdelrahman Sameh	Egypt
silver medal	Ali Khalafalla	Egypt
bronze medal	Yusuf Tibazi	Morocco

The Men's 50 metre butterfly competition of the 2018 African Swimming Championships was held on 15 September 2018.

== Records ==
Prior to the competition, the existing world and championship records were as follows.

	Name	Nation	Time	Location	Date
World record	Andriy Govorov	Ukraine	22.27	Rome	1 July 2018
African record	Roland Schoeman	South Africa	22.90	Rome	26 July 2009
Championship record	Jason Dunford	Kenya	23.50	Johannesburg	3 December 2008

== Results ==
=== Heats ===
The heats were started on 12 September at 10:25.

Rank	Name	Nationality	Time	Notes
1	Yusuf Tibazi	Morocco	24.28	Q
2	Ali Khalafalla	Egypt	24.57	Q
3	Abeiku Jackson	Ghana	24.63	Q
4	Ralph Goveia	Zambia	24.71	Q
5	Abdelrahman Sameh	Egypt	24.83	Q
6	Alaric Basson	South Africa	25.09	Q
7	Bradley Vincent	Mauritius	25.46	Q
8	Daniel Francisco	Angola	26.05	Q
9	Souhail Hamouchane	Morocco	26.06	
10	Aimen Benabid	Algeria	26.17	
11	Filipe Gomes	Malawi	26.44	
12	El Hadji Adama Niane	Senegal	26.63	
13	Adam Moncherry	Seychelles	26.71	
14	Kobe Ndebele	South Africa	26.75	
15	Isihaka Irankunda	Rwanda	27.15	
16	Herinirina John Rakotomavo	Madagascar	27.25	
17	Ganira Belly-Cresus	Burundi	27.48	
18	Mathieu Marquet	Mauritius	27.55	
19	Chase Onorati	Zimbabwe	27.58	
19	Swaleh Talib	Kenya	27.58	
21	Troy Nestor Pina	Cape Verde	27.84	
22	Billy-Scott Irakose	Burundi	28.00	
23	Edilson Paco	Mozambique	28.29	
23	Alvin Omondi	Kenya	28.29	
25	Mohammed Yousuf Bin Mousa	Libya	28.39	
26	Sithembiso Mamba	Eswatini	28.68	
27	Simonga Dlamini	Eswatini	28.86	
28	Adnan Kabuye	Uganda	29.24	
29	Ahmed Izzeldin Salih	Sudan	29.37	
30	Ayaan Chand	Botswana	29.50	
31	Maemo Sebikiri	Botswana	30.51	
32	Zinhle Bekker	Botswana	30.90	
33	Jefferson Kpanou	Benin	33.40	
	Sokomayi Mubikayi	Democratic Republic of the Congo	Did not start	
	Onyemeehi Opute	Nigeria	Did not start	
	Isobo Confidence	Nigeria	Did not start	

=== Final ===
The final was started on 12 September.

Rank	Lane	Name	Nationality	Time	Notes
1st place, gold medalist(s)	2	Abdelrahman Sameh	Egypt	23.71	
2nd place, silver medalist(s)	5	Ali Khalafalla	Egypt	24.10	
3rd place, bronze medalist(s)	4	Yusuf Tibazi	Morocco	24.11	NR
4	6	Ralph Goveia	Zambia	24.67	
5	3	Abeiku Jackson	Ghana	24.68	
6	7	Alaric Basson	South Africa	24.85	
7	1	Bradley Vincent	Mauritius	25.46	
8	8	Daniel Francisco	Angola	26.00	
