= 2018 African Swimming Championships – 4 × 100 metre mixed freestyle relay =

Mixed 4 × 100 metre freestyle relay at the 2018 African Swimming Championships
- Venue: Mohamed Boudiaf Olympic Complex
- Dates: 11 September
- Competitors: 51 from 11 nations
- Teams: 11
- Winning time: 3:36.94

Medalists
gold medal	Ali Khalafalla; Farida Osman; Samiha Mohsen; Mohamed Samy	Egypt
silver medal	Jacques Van Wyk; Erin Gallagher; Alaric Basson; Hannah Kiely; Matthew Bowers; Janie Coetzer; Lesley Blignaut; Ayrton Sweeney	South Africa
bronze medal	Aimen Benabid; Nesrine Medjahed; Mehdi Nazim Benbara; Amel Melih	Algeria

The Mixed 4 × 100 metre freestyle relay competition of the 2018 African Swimming Championships was held on 11 September 2018.

== Records ==
Prior to the competition, the existing world and championship records were as follows.

	Team	Time	Location	Date
World record	United States	3:27.28	Rome	2 August 2009
African record	South Africa	3:31.38	Budapest	29 July 2007
Championship record	—			

The following new records were set during this competition.

Date	Event	Nation	Time	Record
11 September	Heat	Algeria	3:42.43	CR
11 September	Final	Egypt	3:36.94	CR

== Results ==
=== Heats ===
The heats were started on 11 September at 12:15.

Rank	Nation	Swimmers	Time	Notes
1	Algeria	Aimen Benabid (53.44); Nesrine Medjahed (59.72); Mehdi Nazim Benbara (51.64); Amel Melih (57.63)	3:42.43	Q CR
2	Egypt	Ali Khalafalla (52.35); Farida Osman (58.88); Samiha Mohsen (59.93); Mohamed Samy (52.77)	3:43.93	Q
3	Tunisia	Mohamed Aziz Ghaffari (51.78); Farah Benkhelil (59.79); Menna Kchouk (1:01.29); Mohamed Ali Chaouchi (53.45)	3:46.31	Q
4	South Africa	Matthew Bowers (53.14); Janie Coetzer (1:00.32); Lesley Blignaut (1:00.67); Ayrton Sweeney (53.02)	3:47.15	Q
5	Morocco	Samy Boutouil (53.49); Yasmeen Boutouil (1:01.07); Noura Mana (1:00.13); Yusuf Tibazi (56.05)	3:50.74	Q
6	Mauritius	Mathieu Marquet (52.15); Ovesh Purahoo (54.55); Camille Koenig (1:03.19); Tessa Ip Hen Cheung (1:01.74)	3:51.63	Q NR
7	Kenya	Swaleh Talib (54.73); Alvin Omondi (55.98); Imara-Bella Thorpe (1:01.06); Rebecca Kamau (1:02.99)	3:54.76	Q NR
8	Senegal	El Hadji Adama Niane (53.01); Ndeye Tabara Diagne (1:00.28); Adama Ndir (55.91); Amadou Ndiaye (1:07.66)	3:56.86	Q NR
9	Angola	Mario Ervedosa (57.39); Lia Lima (1:05.32); Daniel Francisco (55.07); Catarina Sousa (1:00.62)	3:58.40	NR
10	Mozambique	Edilson Paco (58.46); Ahllan Bique (55.71); Jannat Bique (1:06.39); Denise Mabasso (1:08.59)	4:09.15	
11	Uganda	Adnan Kabuye (58.66); Avice Meya (1:06.38); Selina Katumba (1:06.15); Atuhaire Ambala (58.42)	4:09.61	NR

=== Final ===
The final was started on 11 September.

Rank	Lane	Nation	Swimmers	Time	Notes
1st place, gold medalist(s)	5	Egypt	Ali Khalafalla (50.84); Farida Osman (56.58); Samiha Mohsen (1:00.37); Mohamed Samy (49.15)	3:36.94	CR NR
2nd place, silver medalist(s)	6	South Africa	Jacques Van Wyk (51.08); Erin Gallagher (55.02); Alaric Basson (51.58); Hannah Kiely (59.36)	3:37.04	
3rd place, bronze medalist(s)	4	Algeria	Aimen Benabid (52.77); Nesrine Medjahed (59.48); Mehdi Nazim Benbara (51.23); Amel Melih (56.91)	3:40.39	NR
4	3	Tunisia	Mohamed Aziz Ghaffari (51.30); Farah Benkhelil (59.40); Menna Kchouk (1:00.94); Mohamed Agili (51.41)	3:43.05	
5	7	Mauritius	Mathieu Marquet (52.80); Bradley Vincent (50.38); Camille Koenig (1:01.50); Tessa Ip Hen Cheung (1:02.41)	3:47.09	NR
6	2	Morocco	Yusuf Tibazi (54.02); Yasmeen Boutouil (1:01.57); Noura Mana (1:00.19); Samy Boutouil (52.85)	3:48.63	NR
7	1	Kenya	Swaleh Talib (54.58); Alvin Omondi (56.91); Imara-Bella Thorpe (1:01.70); Rebecca Kamau (1:02.75)	3:55.94	
8	8	Senegal	El Hadji Adama Niane (53.49); Jeanne Boutbien (1:01.02); Adama Ndir (55.11); Ndeye Tabara Diagne (1:07.55)	3:57.17	
