= 2018 FINA World Swimming Championships (25 m) – Men's 100 metre freestyle =

Men's 100 metre freestyle at the 2018 FINA World Swimming Championships (25 m)
- Venue: Hangzhou Sports Park Stadium
- Dates: 15 December (heats and semifinals); 16 December (final)
- Competitors: 114
- Winning time: 45.62

Medalists
gold medal	Caeleb Dressel	United States
silver medal	Vladimir Morozov	Russia
bronze medal	Chad le Clos	South Africa

The men's 100 metre freestyle competition of the 2018 FINA World Swimming Championships (25 m) was held on 15 and 16 December 2018.

== Records ==
Prior to the competition, the existing world and championship records were as follows.

	Name	Nation	Time	Location	Date
World record	Amaury Leveaux	France	44.94	Berlin	13 December 2008
Championship record	Vladimir Morozov	Russia	45.51	Doha	3 December 2014

== Results ==
=== Heats ===
The heats were started on 15 December at 10:36.

Rank	Heat	Lane	Name	Nationality	Time	Notes
1	9	0	Caeleb Dressel	United States	45.98	Q
2	12	4	Vladimir Morozov	Russia	46.20	Q
3	12	5	Vladislav Grinev	Russia	46.38	Q
4	11	4	Blake Pieroni	United States	46.39	Q
5	12	2	Simonas Bilis	Lithuania	46.65	Q
6	12	3	Katsumi Nakamura	Japan	46.70	Q
7	10	6	Marcelo Chierighini	Brazil	46.89	Q
8	12	7	Alessandro Miressi	Italy	46.94	Q
9	8	6	Shane Ryan	Ireland	46.97	Q
10	9	8	Mehdy Metella	France	46.99	Q
11	10	4	Cameron McEvoy	Australia	47.08	Q
12	12	0	Danas Rapšys	Lithuania	47.11	Q
13	12	6	Sergii Shevtsov	Ukraine	47.15	Q
14	11	3	Lorenzo Zazzeri	Italy	47.16	Q
15	10	5	Chad le Clos	South Africa	47.17	Q
16	12	1	Jesse Puts	Netherlands	47.23	Q
17	11	5	Oussama Sahnoune	Algeria	47.33	
18	8	5	Daniel Hunter	New Zealand	47.36	
19	11	2	Louis Townsend	Australia	47.38	
20	10	2	Kenneth To	Hong Kong	47.47	
21	10	7	Christoffer Carlsen	Sweden	47.50	
22	9	6	Mislav Sever	Croatia	47.56	
23	8	7	Velimir Stjepanović	Serbia	47.57	
24	10	8	Damian Wierling	Germany	47.58	
25	10	1	Kristian Golomeev	Greece	47.63	
26	11	8	Stan Pijnenburg	Netherlands	47.67	
27	12	9	Artsiom Machekin	Belarus	47.85	
28	9	3	Ben Hockin	Paraguay	47.91	
28	11	7	Emmanuel Vanluchene	Belgium	47.91	
30	12	8	Kaiya Seki	Japan	47.94	
31	9	1	Maxim Lobanovskij	Hungary	48.03	
32	11	0	Cao Jiwen	China	48.04	
33	8	3	Jan Świtkowski	Poland	48.08	
34	7	5	Cristian Quintero	Venezuela	48.14	
35	10	9	Markus Lie	Norway	48.16	
35	11	6	Konrad Czerniak	Poland	48.16	
37	8	9	Ali Khalafalla	Egypt	48.17	NR
38	9	5	Alexander Trampitsch	Austria	48.24	
39	8	4	Nils Liess	Switzerland	48.34	
40	9	2	Bradley Vincent	Mauritius	48.35	
41	10	0	Hou Yuije	China	48.59	
42	9	9	Adil Kaskabay	Kazakhstan	48.82	
43	9	4	Kregor Zirk	Estonia	48.87	
44	8	2	Andrew James Digby	Thailand	48.91	
45	7	4	Guido Buscaglia	Argentina	49.18	
46	8	8	Riku Pöytäkivi	Finland	49.27	
47	9	7	Julien Henx	Luxembourg	49.48	
48	7	1	Lin Chien-Liang	China	49.57	
49	7	0	Nikola Bjelajac	Bosnia and Herzegovina	49.59	
50	7	6	Virdhawal Khade	India	49.67	
51	7	8	Alex Sobers	Barbados	49.71	
52	6	7	Mohammed Bedour	Jordan	49.73	
53	8	1	Igor Mogne	Mozambique	49.82	
54	6	4	Isaac Beitia Lasso	Panama	50.03	
55	8	0	Dado Fenrir Jasminuson	Iceland	50.19	
56	7	2	Sebastian Arispe	Peru	50.21	
57	6	3	Jean-Luc Zephir	Saint Lucia	50.44	
58	5	4	Sina Gholampour	Iran	50.47	
59	5	3	S.J.Bernardina	Curaçao	50.48	
60	6	2	Kaloyan Bratanov	Bulgaria	50.52	
61	7	3	Abdoul Niane	Senegal	50.55	
62	6	1	Pedro Chiancone	Uruguay	50.57	
63	7	9	Giorgi Biganishvili	Georgia	50.62	
64	7	7	Kyle Abeysinghe	Sri Lanka	50.78	
65	5	1	Dan Siminel	Moldova	50.92	
66	6	5	Jhonny Pérez	Dominican Republic	51.03	
67	5	7	Kohen Kerr	Bahamas	51.18	
68	6	9	Stefano Mitchell	Antigua and Barbuda	51.23	
69	5	6	Souhail Hamouchane	Morocco	51.30	
70	5	8	Delron Felix	Grenada	51.35	
71	4	7	Danilo Rosafio	Kenya	51.37	
72	6	6	Matt Galea	Malta	51.40	
73	6	8	Nixon Hernández	El Salvador	51.43	
74	4	5	Issa al Adawi	Oman	51.48	
75	3	7	Dean Hoffman	Seychelles	51.58	
76	5	9	Vladimir Mamikonyan	Armenia	51.59	
77	2	9	Bakr Al-Dulaimi	Iraq	51.73	
78	4	4	Mohammad Rahman	Bangladesh	51.76	
79	6	0	Sidrell Williams	Jamaica	52.11	
80	4	2	Gianluca Pasolini	San Marino	52.55	
81	5	5	Firas Saidi	Qatar	52.58	
82	2	1	Musa Zhalayev	Turkmenistan	52.84	
83	4	6	Hilal Hemed Hilal	Tanzania	52.88	
84	2	6	Heriniavo Rasolonjatovo	Madagascar	53.30	
85	3	0	Delgerkhuu Myagmar	Mongolia	53.41	
86	4	8	Noel Keane	Palau	53.67	
87	5	2	Christian Nikles	Brunei	53.74	
88	4	3	Thomas Morriss	Samoa	53.79	
89	5	0	Chase Onorati	Zimbabwe	53.85	
90	1	5	Shane Cadogan	Saint Vincent and the Grenadines	53.88	
91	3	8	Kener Torrez	Nicaragua	54.33	
92	1	4	Fadhil Saleh	Uganda	54.36	
93	2	2	James Hendrix	Guam	54.46	
94	1	3	Colins Ebingha	Nigeria	54.85	
95	4	1	Nabeel Hatoum	Palestine	55.26	
96	3	4	Dion Kadriu	Kosovo	55.36	
97	4	0	Josh Tarere	Papua New Guinea	55.66	
98	4	9	Kaleo Kihleng	Federated States of Micronesia	55.83	
99	2	3	Finau Ohuafi	Tonga	55.90	
100	3	9	Carel Irakoze	Burundi	56.28	
101	3	5	Lennosuke Suzuki	Northern Mariana Islands	56.91	
102	2	5	Yousif Ibrahim	Sudan	57.42	
103	2	8	Chanthol Thoeun	Cambodia	57.61	
104	2	4	Nadeem Younas	Pakistan	58.00	
105	3	1	Vadym Semkiv	Saint Martin	59.53	
106	1	6	Tokelo Makepe	Botswana	1:02.54	
107	3	3	Clifton Daromani	Solomon Islands	1:04.67	
108	3	6	Mamadou Tahirou Bah	Guinea	1:07.56	
109	2	7	D.R.da Silva	Timor-Leste	1:10.42	
	2	0	Fenel Lamour	Haiti	DNS	
	10	3	César Cielo	Brazil	DNS	
	11	1	Huseyin Sakci	Turkey	DNS	
	11	9	Dylan Carter	Trinidad and Tobago	DNS	
	3	2	Phillip Kinono	Marshall Islands	DSQ	

=== Semifinals ===
The semifinals were started on 15 December at 19:15.

==== Semifinal 1 ====
Rank	Lane	Name	Nationality	Time	Notes
1	4	Vladimir Morozov	Russia	45.93	Q
2	3	Katsumi Nakamura	Japan	46.24	Q
3	5	Blake Pieroni	United States	46.31	Q
4	2	Mehdy Metella	France	46.53	Q
5	6	Alessandro Miressi	Italy	46.84	
6	1	Lorenzo Zazzeri	Italy	46.98	
7	8	Jesse Puts	Netherlands	47.23	
8	7	Danas Rapšys	Lithuania	47.25	

==== Semifinal 2 ====
Rank	Lane	Name	Nationality	Time	Notes
1	8	Chad le Clos	South Africa	45.89	Q
2	4	Caeleb Dressel	United States	46.09	Q
3	5	Vladislav Grinev	Russia	46.23	Q
4	3	Simonas Bilis	Lithuania	46.46	Q
5	7	Cameron McEvoy	Australia	46.69	
6	1	Sergii Shevtsov	Ukraine	46.86	
7	2	Shane Ryan	Ireland	46.93	
7	6	Marcelo Chierighini	Brazil	46.93	

=== Final ===
The final was held on 16 December at 18:35.

Rank	Lane	Name	Nationality	Time	Notes
1st place, gold medalist(s)	3	Caeleb Dressel	United States	45.62	NR
2nd place, silver medalist(s)	5	Vladimir Morozov	Russia	45.64	
3rd place, bronze medalist(s)	4	Chad le Clos	South Africa	45.89	
4	6	Vladislav Grinev	Russia	45.92	
5	1	Simonas Bilis	Lithuania	46.11	NR
6	8	Mehdy Metella	France	46.51	
7	2	Katsumi Nakamura	Japan	46.57	
7	7	Blake Pieroni	United States	46.57	
