= 2018 African Swimming Championships – Men's 4 × 100 metre freestyle relay =

Men's 4 × 100 metre freestyle relay at the 2018 African Swimming Championships
- Venue: Mohamed Boudiaf Olympic Complex
- Dates: 13 September
- Competitors: 24 from 6 nations
- Teams: 6
- Winning time: 3:21.61

Medalists
gold medal	Abdelrahman Sameh; Mohamed Samy; Marwan Elkamash; Ali Khalafalla	Egypt
silver medal	Jacques Van Wyk; Alaric Basson; Matthew Bowers; Ayrton Sweeney	South Africa
bronze medal	Mohamed Agili; Mohamed Ali Chaouchi; Ahmed Hafnaoui; Mohamed Aziz Ghaffari	Tunisia

The Men's 4 × 100 metre freestyle relay competition of the 2018 African Swimming Championships was held on 13 September 2018.

== Records ==
Prior to the competition, the existing world and championship records were as follows.

	Team	Time	Location	Date
World record	United States	3:08.24	Beijing	11 August 2008
African record	South Africa	3:11.93	Rome	26 July 2009
Championship record	South Africa	3:22.76	Bloemfontein	19 October 2016

The following new records were set during this competition.

Date	Event	Nation	Time	Record
13 September	Final	Egypt	3:21.61	CR

== Results ==
=== Final ===
The final was started on 13 September.

Rank	Nation	Swimmers	Time	Notes
1st place, gold medalist(s)	Egypt	Abdelrahman Sameh (51.42); Mohamed Samy (49.88); Marwan Elkamash (50.91); Ali Khalafalla (49.40)	3:21.61	CR
2nd place, silver medalist(s)	South Africa	Jacques Van Wyk (51.60); Alaric Basson (51.71); Matthew Bowers (52.21); Ayrton Sweeney (51.28)	3:26.80	
3rd place, bronze medalist(s)	Tunisia	Mohamed Agili (51.72); Mohamed Ali Chaouchi (53.03); Ahmed Hafnaoui (52.55); Mohamed Aziz Ghaffari (50.62)	3:27.92	
4	Algeria	Mehdi Nazim Benbara (51.86); Lounis Khendriche (53.16); Mohamed Djaballah (52.58); Aimen Benabid (52.23)	3:29.83	
5	Morocco	Yusuf Tibazi (53.44); Souhail Hamouchane (52.66); Samy Boutouil (53.33); Driss Lahrichi (52.92)	3:32.35	
6	Mauritius	Ovesh Purahoo (54.52); Jonathan Chung Yee (59.58); Bradley Vincent (51.16); Mathieu Marquet (52.59)	3:37.85	
	Nigeria		Did not start	
