= 2018 African Swimming Championships – Men's 100 metre butterfly =

Men's 100 metre butterfly at the 2018 African Swimming Championships
- Venue: Mohamed Boudiaf Olympic Complex
- Dates: 11 September (heats and final)
- Competitors: 25 from 18 nations
- Winning time: 53.72

Medalists
gold medal	Mohamed Samy	Egypt
silver medal	Yusuf Tibazi	Morocco
bronze medal	Ralph Goveia	Zambia

The Men's 100 metre butterfly competition of the 2018 African Swimming Championships was held on 11 September 2018.

== Records ==
Prior to the competition, the existing world and championship records were as follows.

	Name	Nation	Time	Location	Date
World record	Michael Phelps	United States	49.82	Rome	1 August 2009
African record	Chad le Clos	South Africa	50.56	Kazan	8 August 2015
Championship record	Jason Dunford	Kenya	52.49	Johannesburg	7 December 2008

== Results ==
=== Heats ===
The heats were started on 11 September at 09:30.

Rank	Name	Nationality	Time	Notes
1	Alaric Basson	South Africa	54.69	Q
2	Mohamed Samy	Egypt	55.20	Q
3	Abeiku Jackson	Ghana	55.57	Q
4	Yusuf Tibazi	Morocco	55.64	Q
5	Ralph Goveia	Zambia	55.94	Q
6	Abdelrahman Sameh	Egypt	56.00	Q
7	Mohamed Malek Masmoudi	Tunisia	56.70	Q
8	Bradley Vincent	Mauritius	57.30	Q
9	Samy Boutouil	Morocco	57.77	
10	Daniel Francisco	Angola	58.82	
11	Kobe Ndebele	South Africa	59.22	
12	Chase Onorati	Zimbabwe	59.59	
13	Herinirina John Rakotomavo	Madagascar	1:00.20	
14	Isihaka Irankunda	Rwanda	1:00.53	
15	Adam Moncherry	Seychelles	1:01.56	
16	Ganira Belly-Cresus	Burundi	1:01.65	
17	Troy Nestor Pina	Cape Verde	1:02.29	
18	Ovesh Purahoo	Mauritius	1:02.51	
19	Edilson Paco	Mozambique	1:03.20	
20	Simonga Dlamini	Eswatini	1:03.69	
21	Sithembiso Mamba	Eswatini	1:05.82	
22	Billy-Scott Irakose	Burundi	1:06.75	
23	Ayaan Chand	Botswana	1:09.11	
	Onyemeehi Opute	Nigeria	Did not start	
	Isobo Confidence	Nigeria	Did not start	

=== Final ===
The final was started on 12 September.

Rank	Lane	Name	Nationality	Time	Notes
1st place, gold medalist(s)	5	Mohamed Samy	Egypt	53.72	
2nd place, silver medalist(s)	6	Yusuf Tibazi	Morocco	54.20	
3rd place, bronze medalist(s)	2	Ralph Goveia	Zambia	54.53	
4	4	Alaric Basson	South Africa	54.79	
5	3	Abeiku Jackson	Ghana	55.18	
6	7	Abdelrahman Sameh	Egypt	56.53	
7	1	Mohamed Malek Masmoudi	Tunisia	56.59	
8	8	Bradley Vincent	Mauritius	56.66	
