= Swimming at the 2019 African Games – Men's 4 × 100 metre medley relay =

Men's 4 × 100 metre medley relay at the 2019 African Games
- Venue: Mohammed V Sports Complex – Olympic Pool
- Dates: 24 August
- Competitors: 24 from 6 nations
- Teams: 6
- Winning time: 3:40.24

Medalists
gold medal	Martin Binedell; Alaric Basson; Ryan Coetzee; Douglas Erasmus	South Africa
silver medal	Mohamed Samy; Youssef El-Kamash; Khaled Morad; Ali Khalafalla	Egypt
bronze medal	Abdellah Ardjoune; Moncef Aymen Balamane; Jaouad Syoud; Mehdi Nazim Benbara	Algeria

The Men's 4 × 100 metre medley relay competition of the 2019 African Games was held on 24 August 2019.

== Records ==
Prior to the competition, the existing world and championship records were as follows.

	Team	Time	Location	Date
World record	United States	3:27.28	Rome	2 August 2009
African record	South Africa	3:31.53	Rome	2 August 2009
Games record	Egypt	3:42.44	Brazzaville	11 September 2015

The following new records were set during this competition.

Date	Event	Name	Nation	Time	Record
24 August	Final	Martin Binedell; Alaric Basson; Ryan Coetzee; Douglas Erasmus	South Africa	3:40.24	GR

== Results ==
=== Final ===
The final was started on 24 August.

Rank	Lane	Nation	Swimmers	Time	Notes
1st place, gold medalist(s)	7	South Africa	Martin Binedell (56.46); Alaric Basson (1:00.70); Ryan Coetzee (53.18); Douglas Erasmus (49.90)	3:40.24	GR
2nd place, silver medalist(s)	4	Egypt	Mohamed Samy (56.84); Youssef El-Kamash (1:01.17); Khaled Morad (55.17); Ali Khalafalla (48.92)	3:42.10	
3rd place, bronze medalist(s)	5	Algeria	Abdellah Ardjoune (56.30); Moncef Aymen Balamane (1:02.38); Jaouad Syoud (54.01); Mehdi Nazim Benbara (50.78)	3:43.47	NR
4	3	Morocco	Driss Lahrichi (56.70); Adam Chajid (1:06.78); Yusuf Tibazi (54.05); Samy Boutouil (51.29)	3:48.82	NR
5	6	Senegal	Steven Aimable (58.40); Adama Ndir (1:05.65); El Hadji Adama Niane (1:00.49); Abdoul Niane (52.96)	3:57.50	NR
6	2	Kenya	Swaleh Talib (1:04.88); Samuel Ndonga (1:10.52); Maaher Harunani (59.36); Ridhwan Mohamed (54.83)	4:09.59	
