= 2018 African Swimming Championships – Men's 100 metre freestyle =

Men's 100 metre freestyle at the 2018 African Swimming Championships
- Venue: Mohamed Boudiaf Olympic Complex
- Dates: 12 September (heats and final)
- Competitors: 37 from 24 nations
- Winning time: 49.39

Medalists
gold medal	Mohamed Samy	Egypt
silver medal	Ali Khalafalla	Egypt
bronze medal	Bradley Vincent	Mauritius

The Men's 100 metre freestyle competition of the 2018 African Swimming Championships was held on 12 September 2018.

== Records ==
Prior to the competition, the existing world and championship records were as follows.

	Name	Nation	Time	Location	Date
World record	César Cielo	Brazil	46.91	Rome	30 July 2009
African record	Lyndon Ferns	South Africa	47.79	Rome	29 July 2009
Championship record	Oussama Sahnoune	Algeria	49.60	Bloemfontein	18 October 2016

The following new records were set during this competition.

Date	Event	Name	Nationality	Time	Record
12 September	Final	Mohamed Samy	Egypt	49.39	CR

== Results ==
=== Heats ===
The heats were started on 12 September at 09:50.

Rank	Name	Nationality	Time	Notes
1	Mohamed Aziz Ghaffari	Tunisia	52.04	Q
2	Mohamed Samy	Egypt	52.12	Q
3	Bradley Vincent	Mauritius	52.25	Q
4	Ali Khalafalla	Egypt	52.45	Q
5	Jacques van Wyk	South Africa	52.47	Q
6	Matthew Bowers	South Africa	52.58	Q
7	El Hadji Adama Niane	Senegal	53.02	Q
8	Abeiku Jackson	Ghana	53.45	Q NR
9	Mohamed Ali Chaouchi	Tunisia	53.83	
10	Samy Boutouil	Morocco	53.84	
11	Filipe Gomes	Malawi	54.06	
12	Ovesh Purahoo	Mauritius	54.49	
13	Dean Hoffman	Seychelles	54.50	
14	Swaleh Talib	Kenya	54.62	
15	Ahllan Bique	Mozambique	55.30	
16	Mohammed Yousuf Bin Mousa	Libya	55.81	
17	Daniel Francisco	Angola	56.29	
18	Mario Ervedosa	Angola	56.31	
19	Atuhaire Ambala	Uganda	56.55	
20	Belly-Cresus Ganira	Burundi	56.73	
21	Billy-Scott Irakose	Burundi	56.96	
22	Chase Onorati	Zimbabwe	57.05	
23	Herinirina John Rakotomavo	Madagascar	57.56	
24	Adnan Kabuye	Uganda	58.07	
25	Isihaka Irankunda	Rwanda	58.16	
26	Adam Moncherry	Seychelles	59.46	
27	Sithembiso Mamba	Eswatini	1:00.91	
28	Ayaan Chand	Botswana	1:01.05	
29	Liam Emmett	Eswatini	1:01.06	
30	Zinhle Bekker	Botswana	1:02.17	
31	Maemo Sebikiri	Botswana	1:02.92	
32	Houssein Gaber Ibrahim	Djibouti	1:08.11	
33	Omar Darboe	Gambia	1:08.70	
34	Jegan Jobe	Gambia	1:11.71	
	Sokomayi Mubikayi	Democratic Republic of the Congo	Did not start	
	Heriniavo Rasolonjatovo	Madagascar	Did not start	
	Isobo Confidence	Nigeria	Did not start	

=== Final ===
The final was started on 12 September.

Rank	Lane	Name	Nationality	Time	Notes
1st place, gold medalist(s)	5	Mohamed Samy	Egypt	49.39	CR
2nd place, silver medalist(s)	6	Ali Khalafalla	Egypt	49.89	
3rd place, bronze medalist(s)	3	Bradley Vincent	Mauritius	50.24	
4	2	Jacques van Wyk	South Africa	51.21	
5	4	Mohamed Aziz Ghaffari	Tunisia	51.34	
6	7	Matthew Bowers	South Africa	52.48	
7	1	El Hadji Adama Niane	Senegal	53.25	
8	8	Abeiku Jackson	Ghana	53.44	NR
