= 2018 African Swimming Championships – Men's 50 metre breaststroke =

Men's 50 metre breaststroke at the 2018 African Swimming Championships
- Venue: Mohamed Boudiaf Olympic Complex
- Dates: 11 September (heats and final)
- Competitors: 32 from 21 nations
- Winning time: 28.04

Medalists
gold medal	Youssef El-Kamash	Egypt
silver medal	Wassim Elloumi	Tunisia
bronze medal	Alaric Basson	South Africa

The Men's 50 metre breaststroke competition of the 2018 African Swimming Championships was held on 11 September 2018.

== Records ==
Prior to the competition, the existing world and championship records were as follows.

	Name	Nation	Time	Location	Date
World record	Adam Peaty	Great Britain	25.95	Budapest	25 July 2017
African record	Cameron van der Burgh	South Africa	26.54	Budapest	25 July 2017
Championship record	Cameron van der Burgh	South Africa	28.05	Bloemfontein	17 October 2016

The following new records were set during this competition.

Date	Event	Name	Nationality	Time	Record
11 September	Heats	Youssef El-Kamash	Egypt	27.95	CR

== Results ==
=== Heats ===
The heats were started on 11 September at 11:30.

Rank	Name	Nationality	Time	Notes
1	Youssef El-Kamash	Egypt	27.95	Q CR
2	Wassim Elloumi	Tunisia	28.30	Q
3	Alaric Basson	South Africa	28.37	Q
4	Mario Ervedosa	Angola	28.89	Q
5	Siar Abderrazak	Algeria	29.01	Q
6	Beji Adnane	Tunisia	29.08	Q
7	Ralph Goveia	Zambia	29.32	Q
8	Moncef Aymen Balamane	Algeria	29.49	Q
9	Reece Whitaker	South Africa	29.70	
10	Samy Boutouil	Morocco	30.18	
11	Filipe Gomes	Malawi	30.48	
12	Adama Ndir	Senegal	30.49	
13	Ahllan Bique	Mozambique	30.94	
14	Samuel Ndonga	Kenya	30.98	
15	Yusuf Tibazi	Morocco	31.30	
16	Jonathan Chung Yee	Mauritius	31.86	
17	Isihaka Irankunda	Rwanda	32.36	
18	Simonga Dlamini	Eswatini	33.71	
19	Swaleh Talib	Kenya	34.02	
20	Ayaan Chand	Botswana	34.76	
21	Yaya Yeressa	Guinea	35.52	
22	Liam Emmett	Eswatini	35.74	
23	Omar Darboe	Gambia	36.14	
24	Abdoul Nignan	Burkina Faso	36.88	
25	Zinhle Bekker	Botswana	37.33	
26	Landry Koumondji	Benin	37.42	
27	Jefferson Kpanou	Benin	40.02	
28	Jere Gomegzani	Malawi	45.07	
	Jegan Jobe	Gambia	Disqualified	
	Fabrice Mopama	Democratic Republic of the Congo	Did not start	
	Onyemeehi Opute	Nigeria	Did not start	
	Oduni Chukwuka	Nigeria	Did not start	

=== Final ===
The final was started on 11 September.

Rank	Lane	Name	Nationality	Time	Notes
1st place, gold medalist(s)	4	Youssef El-Kamash	Egypt	28.04	
2nd place, silver medalist(s)	5	Wassim Elloumi	Tunisia	28.25	NR=
3rd place, bronze medalist(s)	3	Alaric Basson	South Africa	28.42	
4	2	Siar Abderrazak	Algeria	28.97	
5	7	Beji Adnane	Tunisia	29.11	
6	8	Moncef Aymen Balamane	Algeria	29.24	
7	6	Mario Ervedosa	Angola	29.70	
	1	Ralph Goveia	Zambia	Did not start	
