= Swimming at the 2019 African Games – 4 × 100 metre mixed freestyle relay =

Mixed 4 × 100 metre freestyle relay at the 2019 African Games
- Venue: Mohammed V Sports Complex – Olympic Pool
- Dates: 23 August (heats and final)
- Competitors: 49 from 10 nations
- Teams: 10
- Winning time: 3:31.24

Medalists
gold medal	Douglas Erasmus; Ryan Coetzee; Emma Chelius; Erin Gallagher; Carla Antonopoulos; Brad Tandy; Kerryn Herbst	South Africa
silver medal	Mohamed Samy; Ali Khalafalla; Amina Elsebelgy; Farida Osman; Abdelrahman Elaraby; Ahmed Salem; Farida Samra	Egypt
bronze medal	Mehdi Nazim Benbara; Jaouad Syoud; Amel Melih; Majda Chebaraka; Moncef Aymen Balamane; Ramzi Chouchar; Hamida Rania Nefsi	Algeria

The Mixed 4 × 100 metre freestyle relay competition of the 2019 African Games was held on 23 August 2019.

== Records ==
Prior to the competition, the existing world and championship records were as follows.

	Team	Time	Location	Date
World record	United States	3:19.40	Gwangju	27 July 2019
African record	South Africa	3:31.38	Budapest	29 July 2017
Games record	South Africa	3:31.56	Brazzaville	15 September 2015

The following new records were set during this competition.

Date	Event	Name	Nation	Time	Record
23 August	Final	Douglas Erasmus; Ryan Coetzee; Emma Chelius; Erin Gallagher	South Africa	3:31.24	AF, GR

== Results ==
=== Heats ===
The heats were started on 23 August at 11:35.

Rank	Heat	Lane	Nation	Swimmers	Time	Notes
1	2	7	South Africa	Carla Antonopoulos (1:01.24); Douglas Erasmus (52.85); Brad Tandy (51.31); Kerryn Herbst (58.59)	3:43.99	Q
2	2	4	Egypt	Abdelrahman Elaraby (53.19); Amina Elsebelgy (59.29); Ahmed Salem (52.93); Farida Samra (59.18)	3:44.59	Q
3	1	5	Senegal	El Hadji Adama Niane (52.29); Abdoul Niane (51.95); Jeanne Boutbien (59.52); Sophia Diagne (1:02.72)	3:46.48	Q
4	2	5	Kenya	Ridhwan Mohamed (53.20); Maria Brunlehner (1:00.77); Emily Muteti (1:02.20); Issa Mohamed (54.00)	3:50.17	Q
5	1	4	Algeria	Moncef Aymen Balamane (55.68); Ramzi Chouchar (54.69); Hamida Rania Nefsi (1:02.15); Majda Chebaraka (59.19)	3:51.71	Q
6	1	6	Nigeria	Phillip Adejumo (52.55); Abibat Ogunbanwo (1:02.41); Timipame-ere Akiayefa (1:03.00); Yellow Yeiyah (54.64)	3:52.60	Q
7	2	3	Morocco	Souhail Hamouchane (53.97); Noura Mana (1:00.41); Lina Khiyara (1:02.98); Merwane El Merini (55.35)	3:52.71	Q
8	1	3	Zimbabwe	Robyn Lee (1:02.18); Nomvulo Mjimba (1:03.36); Ayman Khatoun (57.51); Peter Wetzlar (55.02)	3:58.07	Q, WD
9	1	2	Botswana	Kitso Matija (55.87); Naomi Ruele (1:02.97); Caitlin Loo (1:04.92); Adrian Robinson (55.00)	3:58.76	Q
10	2	6	Angola	Daniel Francisco (54.44); João Duarte (1:00.68); Lia Lima (1:05.72); Catarina Sousa (59.06)	3:59.90	

=== Final ===
The final was started on 23 August.

Rank	Lane	Nation	Swimmers	Time	Notes
1st place, gold medalist(s)	4	South Africa	Douglas Erasmus (50.42); Ryan Coetzee (49.74); Emma Chelius (55.87); Erin Gallagher (55.21)	3:31.24	AF, GR; NR
2nd place, silver medalist(s)	5	Egypt	Mohamed Samy (49.86); Ali Khalafalla (49.75); Amina Elsebelgy (58.27); Farida Osman (56.43)	3:34.31	
3rd place, bronze medalist(s)	2	Algeria	Mehdi Nazim Benbara (51.69); Jaouad Syoud (50.39); Amel Melih (58.02); Majda Chebaraka (59.72)	3:39.82	NR
4	3	Senegal	Abdoul Niane (52.08); El Hadji Adama Niane (51.67); Sophia Diagne (1:01.49); Jeanne Boutbien (58.65)	3:43.89	NR
5	1	Morocco	Souhail Hamouchane (52.57); Noura Mana (1:00.57); Lina Khiyara (1:00.63); Merwane El Merini (54.25)	3:48.02	NR
6	6	Kenya	Ridhwan Mohamed (52.93); Maria Brunlehner (1:00.25); Emily Muteti (1:01.71); Issa Mohamed (53.43)	3:48.32	
7	7	Nigeria	Phillip Adejumo (51.89); Abibat Ogunbanwo (1:01.86); Timipame-ere Akiayefa (1:02.07); Yellow Yeiyah (55.08)	3:50.90	NR
8	8	Botswana	Kitso Matija (56.03); Naomi Ruele (1:00.41); Caitlin Loo (1:05.38); Adrian Robinson (55.84)	3:57.66	
