= Ralph Goveia =

Zambian swimmer (born 1996)

Personal information
- Full name: Ralph Wesley Goveia
- Nationality: Zambia
- Born: 8 March 1996 (age 30)

Sport
- Sport: Swimming
- Strokes: butterfly
Medal record
African Championships
Bronze medal – third place	2018 Algiers	100 m butterfly

Ralph Wesley Goveia Assafrao (born March 8, 1996) is a Zambian swimmer. He competed at the 2016 Summer Olympics in the men's 100 metre butterfly event; his time of 54.84 seconds in the heats did not qualify him for the semifinals.

== Major results ==
=== Individual ===
==== Long course ====
Year	Competition	Venue	Position	Event	Notes
Representing Zambia
2013	World Championships	Barcelona, Spain	58th (h)	50 m butterfly	26.31
2013	World Championships	Barcelona, Spain	49th (h)	100 m butterfly	57.66
2014	Commonwealth Games	(United Kingdom) Glasgow, Great Britain	24th (h)	100 m breaststroke	1:07.54
2014	Commonwealth Games	(United Kingdom) Glasgow, Great Britain	18th (h)	50 m butterfly	25.35
2014	Commonwealth Games	(United Kingdom) Glasgow, Great Britain	19th (h)	100 m butterfly	56.33
2014	Commonwealth Games	(United Kingdom) Glasgow, Great Britain	19th (h)	200 m medley	2:13.90
2014	Youth Olympic Games	Nanjing, China	22nd (h)	50 m butterfly	25.33
2014	Youth Olympic Games	Nanjing, China	18th (h)	100 m butterfly	56.16
2015	World Championships	Kazan, Russia	46th (h)	50 m butterfly	25.16
2015	World Championships	Kazan, Russia	55th (h)	100 m butterfly	56.34
2015	African Games	Brazzaville, Republic of the Congo	10th (h)	50 m breaststroke	29.92
2015	African Games	Brazzaville, Republic of the Congo	9th (h)	100 m breaststroke	1:08.14
2015	African Games	Brazzaville, Republic of the Congo	6th	50 m butterfly	25.25
2015	African Games	Brazzaville, Republic of the Congo	7th	100 m butterfly	56.38
2015	African Games	Brazzaville, Republic of the Congo	-	200 m medley *^{1}	DNS
2016	Olympic Games	Rio de Janeiro, Brazil	38th (h)	100 m butterfly	54.84
2016	African Championships	Bloemfontein, South Africa	8th	50 m freestyle	24.86
2016	African Championships	Bloemfontein, South Africa	9th (h)	100 m freestyle	54.00
2016	African Championships	Bloemfontein, South Africa	10th (h)	200 m freestyle	2:02.09
2016	African Championships	Bloemfontein, South Africa	4th	50 m butterfly	25.17
2016	African Championships	Bloemfontein, South Africa	4th	100 m butterfly	55.46
2017	World Championships	Budapest, Hungary	39th (h)	50 m butterfly	24.56
2017	World Championships	Budapest, Hungary	53rd (h)	100 m butterfly	54.86
2018	Commonwealth Games	Gold Coast, Australia	-	50 m breaststroke	DNS
2018	Commonwealth Games	Gold Coast, Australia	14th (sf)	50 m butterfly	24.49
2018	Commonwealth Games	Gold Coast, Australia	10th (sf)	100 m butterfly	54.10
2018	African Championships	Algiers, Algeria	10th (h)	50 m freestyle	24.19
2018	African Championships	Algiers, Algeria	-	50 m breaststroke *^{2}	DNS
2018	African Championships	Algiers, Algeria	4th	50 m butterfly	24.67
2018	African Championships	Algiers, Algeria	3rd	100 m butterfly	54.53
2019	World Championships	Gwangju, South Korea	54th (h)	50 m butterfly	25.08
2019	World Championships	Gwangju, South Korea	49th (h)	100 m butterfly	55.14
2019	African Games	Casablanca, Morocco	15th (h)	50 m freestyle	24.17
2019	African Games	Casablanca, Morocco	10th (h)	50 m breaststroke	29.26
2019	African Games	Casablanca, Morocco	8th	50 m butterfly	24.90
2019	African Games	Casablanca, Morocco	8th	100 m butterfly	55.10

Note:

- ^{1} Did not start in the final. (At the heats, he finished 8th place with 2:13.12 new national record.)
- ^{2} Did not start in the final. (At the heats, he finished 7th place with 29.32 new national record.)

==== Short course ====
Year	Competition	Venue	Position	Event	Notes
Representing Zambia
2012	World Championships	Istanbul, Turkey	74th (h)	50 m butterfly	26.34
2012	World Championships	Istanbul, Turkey	72nd (h)	100 m butterfly	58.90
2012	World Championships	Istanbul, Turkey	55th (h)	100 m medley	1:02.46
2016	World Championships	Windsor, Canada	63rd (h)	50 m freestyle	23.27
2016	World Championships	Windsor, Canada	61st (h)	50 m breaststroke	28.79
2016	World Championships	Windsor, Canada	34th (h)	50 m butterfly	24.00
2016	World Championships	Windsor, Canada	39th (h)	100 m butterfly	53.63
2016	World Championships	Windsor, Canada	46th (h)	100 m medley	57.15
2018	World Championships	Hangzhou, China	45th (h)	50 m butterfly	24.18
2018	World Championships	Hangzhou, China	46th (h)	100 m butterfly	54.42

=== Relay ===
==== Long course ====
Year	Competition	Venue	Position	Event	Notes
Representing Zambia
2014	Commonwealth Games	(United Kingdom) Glasgow, Great Britain	13th (h)	4 × 100 m freestyle	3:49.62
2014	Commonwealth Games	(United Kingdom) Glasgow, Great Britain	13th (h)	4 × 100 m medley	4:12.10
2015	World Championships	Kazan, Russia	20th (h)	4 × 100 m mixed medley	4:14.40
2019	African Games	Casablanca, Morocco	10th (h)	4 × 100 m mixed medley	4:27.78

==== Short course ====
Year	Competition	Venue	Position	Event	Notes
Representing Zambia
2016	World Championships	Windsor, Canada	23rd (h)	4 × 50 m mixed medley	1:50.01
