= Ryan Coetzee (swimmer) =

South African swimmer (born 1995)

Personal information
- Nationality: South African
- Born: 12 August 1995 (age 30) Phalaborwa
- Height: 1.84 m (6 ft 0 in)
- Weight: 90 kg (198 lb)

Sport
- Sport: Swimming
- Strokes: Butterfly, freestyle
- College team: University of Tennessee
Medal record
Men's swimming
Representing South Africa
Commonwealth Games
Bronze medal – third place	2018 Gold Coast	50 m butterfly
Bronze medal – third place	2018 Gold Coast	4×100 m medley
African Games
Gold medal – first place	2019 Casablanca	100 m butterfly
Gold medal – first place	2019 Casablanca	4×100 m freestyle
Gold medal – first place	2019 Casablanca	4×100 m medley
Gold medal – first place	2019 Casablanca	4×100 m mixed freestyle
Bronze medal – third place	2019 Casablanca	50 m butterfly
World Junior Championships
Bronze medal – third place	2013 Dubai	4×100 m medley

Ryan Coetzee (born 12 August 1995) is a South African swimmer. He competed in the men's 100 metre butterfly at the 2019 World Aquatics Championships. In 2018, Coetzee won bronze medals in the Men's 50m Butterfly and 4x100 medley relay at the Commonwealth Games.
