= List of Moroccan records in swimming =

The Moroccan Records in Swimming are the fastest times ever swum by an individual from Morocco. These national records are maintained by Morocco's swimming federation, the Royal Moroccan Swimming Federation (FRMN).

FRMN keeps records for both for men and women, for events in long course (50m) and short course (25m) courses. Records are kept in the following events (by stroke):

- freestyle (libre): 50, 100, 200, 400, 800 and 1500;
- backstroke (dos): 50, 100 and 200;
- breaststroke (brasse): 50, 100 and 200;
- butterfly (papillon): 50, 100 and 200;
- individual medley (4 Nages): 100 (25m only), 200 and 400;
- relays: 4x50 free, 4x100 free, 4x200 free, 4x50 medley, and 4 × 100 medley.

All records were achieved in finals unless otherwise specified.

== Long course (50 m) ==
=== Men ===
Event	Time		Name	Club	Date	Meet	Location	Ref
50 m freestyle	22.71		Marwane Sebbata	USCM	26 July 2024	Moroccan Summer Championships	Casablanca, Morocco	
50 m freestyle	22.35	not ratified	Mehdi Ayoubi	Club Aquatique Montréal	4 August 2017	Canadian Championships	Montreal, Canada	
100 m freestyle	50.04	h	Marwane Sebbata	Morocco	30 July 2025	World Championships	Singapore, Singapore	
100 m freestyle	49.93	not ratified	Mehdi Ayoubi	Club Aquatique Montréal	27 July 2017	Canadian Junior Championships	Toronto, Canada	
200 m freestyle	1:51.32	c	Ryan Barbe	Dauphins Du Toec	12 June 2022	French Championships	Rennes, France	
400 m freestyle	3:55.59	h	Ryan Barbe	Dauphins Du Toec	11 June 2022	French Championships	Rennes, France	
800 m freestyle	8:17.91		Ilias El Fallaki	C.N. Alcala	20 June 2024	Spanish Championships	Palma de Mallorca, Spain	
1500 m freestyle	16:08.43		Ilias El Fallaki	-	8 December 2023	-	Port Louis, Mauritius	
50 m backstroke	25.93	tt, =	Driss Lahrichi	Canet 66 Natation	18 April 2019	French Championships	Rennes, France	
50 m backstroke	25.93	h, =	Driss Lahrichi	Morocco	23 August 2019	African Games	Casablanca, Morocco	
100 m backstroke	56.22		Driss Lahrichi	Morocco	24 August 2019	African Games	Casablanca, Morocco	
200 m backstroke	2:04.92		Driss Lahrichi	COD Meknès	4 July 2019	Moroccan Championships	Casablanca, Morocco	
50 m breaststroke	27.78	h	Samy Boutouil	Morocco	29 July 2025	World Championships	Singapore, Singapore	
100 m breaststroke	1:03.38		Samy Boutouil	CN Antibes	30 March 2025	French Southern Region Spring Championships	Saint-Raphaël, France	
200 m breaststroke	2:21.03		Kziber Bakr	FUS	26 July 2024	Moroccan Summer Championships	Casablanca, Morocco	
50m butterfly	24.11		Yusuf Tibazi	Morocco	12 September 2018	African Championships	Algiers, Algeria	
100m butterfly	53.78	h	Yusuf Tibazi	Albany Armada	17 May 2024	Atlanta Classic	Atlanta, United States	
200m butterfly	2:02.49		Said Saber	CN Cannes	14 September 2018	African Championships	Algiers, Algeria	
200m individual medley	2:05.35		Morad Berrada	Morocco	21 December 2011	Pan Arab Games	Doha, Qatar	
400m individual medley	4:25.58	b	Morad Berrada	Nautic Club Nîmes	18 March 2012	French Championships	Dunkirk, France	
4×50m freestyle relay	1:43.53		Youssef Hafdi; Alae Guerrouani; Mahdi Zidouhia; Aziz Toumi	-	22 December 2001	-	Casablanca, Morocco	
4×100m freestyle relay	3:25.92		Souhail Hamouchane (52.11); Driss Lahrichi (51.44); Merwane El Merini (52.04); Samy Boutouil (50.33)	Morocco	21 August 2019	African Games	Casablanca, Morocco	
4×200m freestyle relay	7:46.58		Adil Asouab; Abdeljabbar Regragui; Youssef Hemri; Ali Hemri	Morocco	5 August 2018	-	Casablanca, Morocco	
4×50m medley relay	1:54.46		Youssef Hafdi; Alae Guerrouani; Mahdi Zidouhia; Aziz Toumi	-	22 December 2001	-	Casablanca, Morocco	
4×100m medley relay	3:48.82		Driss Lahrichi (56.70); Adam Chajid (1:06.78); Yusuf Tibazi (54.05); Samy Boutouil (51.29)	Morocco	24 August 2019	African Games	Casablanca, Morocco	

Legend: # – Record awaiting ratification by Fédération Royale Marocaine de Natation; WR – World record; AF – African record;
Records not set in finals: h – heat; sf – semifinal; r – relay 1st leg; rh – relay heat 1st leg; b – B final; † – en route to final mark; so – swim-off; tt – time trial

=== Women ===
Event	Time		Name	Club	Date	Meet	Location	Ref
50m freestyle	26.81		Noura Mana	-	1 July 2018	Coupe du Trone	Casablanca, Morocco	
100m freestyle	58.30		Sara El Bekri	Morocco	17 September 2010	African Championships	Casablanca, Morocco	
200m freestyle	2:03.10		Sara El Bekri	Morocco	17 December 2011	Pan Arab Games	Doha, Qatar	
400m freestyle	4:17.55		Sara El Bekri	Morocco	19 December 2011	Pan Arab Games	Doha, Qatar	
800m freestyle	8:49.57		Sara El Bekri	Lagardère Paris Racing	24 February 2012	Grand Prix Jean-Boiteux	Bordeaux, France	
1500m freestyle	17:04.85		Sara El Bekri	Lagardère Paris Racing	17 February 2012	Sarcelles Meet	Sarcelles, France	
50m backstroke	30.01		Hiba Fahsi	Morocco	24 July 2018	African Youth Games	Algiers, Algeria	
100m backstroke	1:04.82		Hiba Fahsi	Morocco	15 July 2018	Arab Championships	Rades, Tunisia	
200m backstroke	2:20.73		Hiba Fahsi	Morocco	23 July 2018	African Youth Games	Algiers, Algeria	
50m breaststroke	31.54		Sara El Bekri	Lyon Natation	22 April 2009	French Championships	Montpellier, France	
100m breaststroke	1:08.21	h	Sara El Bekri	Morocco	29 July 2012	Olympic Games	London, United Kingdom	
200m breaststroke	2:25.86	sf	Sara El Bekri	Morocco	1 August 2012	Olympic Games	London, United Kingdom	
50m butterfly	27.47	h	Imane El Barodi	Morocco	1 August 2025	World Championships	Singapore, Singapore	
50m butterfly	27.40	'#'	Imane El Barodi	Morocco	9 November 2025	Islamic Solidarity Games	Riyadh, Saudi Arabia	
100m butterfly	1:03.35	b	Sherazade Ramond	CS Meaux Natation	22 May 2009	French Junior Championships	Chalon-sur-Saône, France	
200m butterfly	2:16.21		Sara El Bekri	Morocco	19 December 2011	Pan Arab Games	Doha, Qatar	
200m individual medley	2:17.24		Sara El Bekri	Morocco	22 December 2011	Pan Arab Games	Doha, Qatar	
400m individual medley	4:48.04		Sara El Bekri	Morocco	18 December 2011	Pan Arab Games	Doha, Qatar	
4×50m freestyle relay	1:59.25		Imane Boulaamane; Marwa Boulaamane; Lilia Karrakchou; Kenza Lyagoubi	CNJ	19 July 2008	-	Rabat, Morocco	
4×100m freestyle relay	4:00.33		Imane Houda El Barodi (1:01.28); Noura Mana (59.64); Hiba Fahsi (59.15); Yasmeen Boutouil (1:00.26)	Morocco	15 July 2018	Arab Championships	Rades, Tunisia	
4×200m freestyle relay	8:43.40		Rania El Abdi (2:12.84); Shahrazad Ramond (2:13.78); Noufissa Chbihi (2:10.51); Sara El Bekri (2:06.27)	Morocco	13 September 2011	African Championships	Casablanca, Morocco	
4×50m medley relay	2:14.74		Lilia Karrakchou; Rita El Boukhari; Kenza Lyagoubi; Imane Boulaamane	CNJ	19 July 2008	-	Rabat, Morocco	
4×100m medley relay	4:22.21		Imane Boulaamane (1:08.81); Sara El Bekri (1:08.05); Noufissa Chbihi (1:05.06); Marwa El Banar (1:00.29)	Morocco	17 December 2011	Pan Arab Games	Doha, Qatar	

Legend: # – Record awaiting ratification by Fédération Royale Marocaine de Natation; WR – World record; AF – African record;
Records not set in finals: h – heat; sf – semifinal; r – relay 1st leg; rh – relay heat 1st leg; b – B final; † – en route to final mark; so – swim-off; tt – time trial

=== Mixed relay ===
Event	Time	Name	Club	Date	Meet	Location	Ref
4×100 m freestyle relay	3:48.02	Souhail Hamouchane (52.57); Noura Mana (1:00.57); Lina Khiyara (1:00.63); Merwane El Merini (54.25)	Morocco	23 August 2019	African Games	Casablanca, Morocco	
4×100 m medley relay	4:08.28 (Note: by official result source; 4:08.11 by FRMN source; probably a typo)	Driss Lahrichi (56.55); Hiba Laknit (1:16.02); Yusuf Tibazi (55.59); Noura Mana (1:00.12)	Morocco	22 August 2019	African Games	Casablanca, Morocco	

Legend: # – Record awaiting ratification by Fédération Royale Marocaine de Natation; WR – World record; AF – African record;
Records not set in finals: h – heat; so – swim-off

== Short course (25 m) ==
=== Men ===
Event	Time		Name	Club	Date	Meet	Location	Ref
50 m freestyle	22.12		Marwane Sebbata	-	23 June 2024	Moroccan Regional Championships	Salé, Morocco	
100 m freestyle	48.48	h	Marwane Sebbata	Morocco	11 December 2024	World Championships	Budapest, Hungary	
200 m freestyle	1:46.53		Yassine Sebbata	C.N. Palma de Mallorca	19 December 2025	Spanish Club Cup First Division	Pontevedra, Spain	
400m freestyle	3:53.41		Ali Hemri	Laval	7 November 2021	Coupe Universitaire 3	Quebec City, Canada	
800m freestyle	8:11.47		Ali Hemri	Laval	27 November 2021	Quebec Cup	Quebec City, Canada	
1500m freestyle	15:50.09		Ali Hemri	Laval	24 November 2019	Coupe Universitaire 2	Québec, Canada	
50m backstroke	25.06		Marwane Sebbata	-	23 June 2024	Moroccan Regional Championships	Salé, Morocco	
100m backstroke	53.68	h	Driss Lahrichi	Canet 88 Natation	13 December 2019	French Championships	Angers, France	
200m backstroke	1:57.58	h	Driss Lahrichi	Canet 88 Natation	15 November 2018	French Championships	Montpellier, France	
50m breaststroke	26.81	h	Samy Boutouil	Morocco	14 December 2024	World Championships	Budapest, Hungary	
100m breaststroke	59.55		Samy Boutouil	Grenoble Alp'38	25 October 2025	French Championships	Taverny, France	
200m breaststroke	2:18.54		Bakr Kziber	Fath Union Sport	19 October 2024	NVB Back-to-School Meeting	Villefranche-sur-Saône, France	
50m butterfly	24.11		Yassine Sebbata	USCM	22 June 2025	Moroccan Regional Championships	Salé, Morocco	
100m butterfly	53.93	h	Samy Boutouil	Morocco	17 December 2021	World Championships	Abu Dhabi, United Arab Emirates	
200m butterfly	2:00.02	h	Nouamane Batahi	CN Cannes	18 November 2016	French Championships	Angers, France	
100m individual medley	54.55	h	Samy Boutouil	CN Marseille	6 November 2022	French Championships	Chartres, France	
200m individual medley	2:03.59	h	Morad Berrada	Nautic Club Nîmes	4 December 2011	French Championships	Angers, France	
400m individual medley	4:18.78	h	Morad Berrada	Nautic Club Nîmes	3 December 2011	French Championships	Angers, France	
4×50m freestyle relay	1:41.18		Marwane Sebbata; Hamza Kamal; Omar Benmoussa; Ilyas Elfallak	Morocco	24 October 2021	-	Abu Dhabi, United Arab Emirates	
4×100m freestyle relay	3:24.52	not ratified	Souhail Hamouchane; Adil Assouab; Driss Lahrichi; Mehdi Ayoubi	CODM	27 January 2018	Moroccan Championships	Meknes, Morocco	
4×200m freestyle relay	7:48.34		Salaheddine Arigui; Bakr Kziber; Badr Ben Assila; Said Saber	AS.FAR	11 April 2015	-	Meknes, Morocco	
4×50m medley relay	1:31.37	not ratified	Nizar El Alami; Mehdi Moulay Berkchi; Kalil Alaoui; El Mehdi Chabadi	USCM	16 May 2010	Region III Criterium	Rabat, Morocco	
4×100m medley relay	3:47.77		Driss Lahrichi; Ahmed Reda Ennaim; Said Saber; Souhail Hamouchane	CODM	12 February 2017	Moroccan Championships	Meknes, Morocco	

Legend: # – Record awaiting ratification by Fédération Royale Marocaine de Natation; WR – World record; AF – African record;
Records not set in finals: h – heat; sf – semifinal; r – relay 1st leg; rh – relay heat 1st leg; b – B final; † – en route to final mark; so – swim-off; tt – time trial

=== Women ===
Event	Time		Name	Club	Date	Meet	Location	Ref
50 m freestyle	26.32	h	Imane El Barodi	Morocco	20 December 2021	World Championships	Abu Dhabi, United Arab Emirates	
100 m freestyle	57.62		Yasmeen Boutouil	CSM Clamart	21 December 2014	French Championships N2	Chevreuse, France	
200 m freestyle	2:02.02		Lina Khiyara	Perron	25 November 2018	Hasseltse 200 meters	Hasselt, Belgium	
400 m freestyle	4:16.17		Sara El Bekri	Lagardere Paris Racing	19 November 2011	Saint-Dizier Meet	Saint-Dizier, France	
800 m freestyle	8:46.14		Sara El Bekri	Lagardere Paris Racing	18 November 2011	Saint-Dizier Meet	Saint-Dizier, France	
1500 m freestyle	17:05.75		Malak Meqdar	CN Epinettes Paris	30 November 2024	Paris Winter Championship	Paris, France	
50m backstroke	29.22	h	Hiba Fahsi	Morocco	14 December 2018	World Championships	Hangzhou, China	
100m backstroke	1:04.34	h	Yasmeen Boutouil	CSM Clamart	19 November 2015	French Championships	Angers, France	
200m backstroke	2:15.95	h	Hiba Fahsi	Morocco	13 December 2018	World Championships	Hangzhou, China	
50m breaststroke	31.21	b	Imane El Barodi	Morocco	31 October 2024	French Championships	Montpellier, France	
100m breaststroke	1:06.50		Sara El Bekri	Lagardere Paris Racing	2 December 2011	French Championships	Angers, France	
200m breaststroke	2:23.54	h	Sara El Bekri	Lagardere Paris Racing	3 December 2011	French Championships	Angers, France	
50m butterfly	27.62	c	Imane El Barodi	Morocco	3 November 2024	French Championships	Montpellier, France	
100m butterfly	1:02.58		Sara El Bekri	Lagardere Paris Racing	13 November 2011	Autumn National Meet	Compiègne, France	
200m butterfly	2:13.41		Sara El Bekri	Lagardere Paris Racing	19 November 2011	Saint-Dizier Meet	Saint-Dizier, France	
100m individual medley	1:02.98	h	Sara El Bekri	Morocco	16 December 2010	World Championships	Dubai, United Arab Emirates	
200m individual medley	2:15.39	h	Sara El Bekri	Morocco	18 December 2010	World Championships	Dubai, United Arab Emirates	
400m individual medley	4:48.22	h	Sara El Bekri	Morocco	15 December 2010	World Championships	Dubai, United Arab Emirates	
4×50m freestyle relay	1:54.61		Sofia Garnoussi; Malak Meqdar; Zineb Atillah; Inass Allaoui	Morocco	24 October 2021	Arab Championships	Abu Dhabi, United Arab Emirates	
4×100m freestyle relay	4:05.50		Doha Fahsi; Mariam Sellaf; Hiba Laknit; Hiba Fahsi	OCK	27 January 2018	Moroccan Championships	Meknes, Morocco	
4×200m freestyle relay	9:02.06		Ghita Assouab; Kenza El Mhamedi; Kenza Laissaoui; Meryem Bada	CODM	11 April 2015	-	Meknes, Morocco	
4×50m medley relay	2:08.66		Sofia Garnoussi; Malak Meqdar; Zineb Atillah; Inass Allaoui	Morocco	25 October 2021	Arab Championships	Abu Dhabi, United Arab Emirates	
4×100m medley relay	4:32.79		Sofia Garnoussi; Malak Meqdar; Meryem Bahajoub; Inass Allaoui	Morocco	27 October 2021	Arab Championships	Abu Dhabi, United Arab Emirates	

Legend: # – Record awaiting ratification by Fédération Royale Marocaine de Natation; WR – World record; AF – African record;
Records not set in finals: h – heat; sf – semifinal; r – relay 1st leg; rh – relay heat 1st leg; b – B final; † – en route to final mark; so – swim-off; tt – time trial

=== Mixed relay ===
Event	Time	Name	Club	Date	Meet	Location	Ref
4×100 m freestyle relay	4:00.16	Mehdi Moulay Berkchi; Miriam Eide; Nizar El Alami; Yasmeen Boutouil	USCM	23 January 2016	-	Meknès, Morocco	
4×100 m medley relay	4:23.10	Imane Boulaamane; Ahmed Reda Ennaim; Nouaamane Batahi; Ghita Assouab	CODM	24 January 2016	-	Meknès, Morocco	

Legend: # – Record awaiting ratification by Fédération Royale Marocaine de Natation; WR – World record; AF – African record;
Records not set in finals: h – heat; so – swim-off
