= Amel Melih =

Algerian swimmer (born 1993)

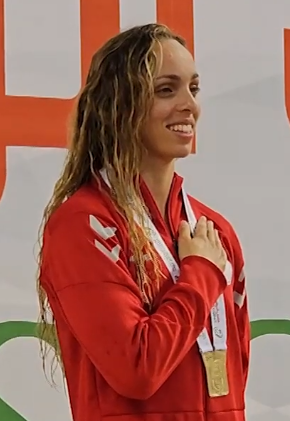
- Melih in 2023

Personal information
- Native name: آمال مليح
- Nationality: Algerian
- Born: 6 October 1993 (age 32) Lyon, France
- Height: 1.74 m (5 ft 9 in)
- Weight: 63 kg (139 lb)

Sport
- Sport: Swimming
- Strokes: Backstroke, freestyle
- Club: SAL Saint-Priest Natation
Medal record
Women's swimming
Representing Algeria
Event	1st	2nd	3rd
African Championships	3	5	10
African Games	0	0	8
Islamic Solidarity Games	0	1	2
Total	3	6	20
African Championships
Gold medal – first place	2016 Bloemfontein	50 m freestyle
Gold medal – first place	2016 Bloemfontein	100 m freestyle
Gold medal – first place	2016 Bloemfontein	4×100 m freestyle
Gold medal – first place	2024 Luanda	50 m freestyle
Gold medal – first place	2024 Luanda	50 m butterfly
Gold medal – first place	2024 Luanda	4×100 m freestyle
Gold medal – first place	2024 Luanda	4×100 m mixed freestyle
Silver medal – second place	2016 Bloemfontein	50 m backstroke
Silver medal – second place	2016 Bloemfontein	4×200 m freestyle
Silver medal – second place	2018 Algiers	4×200 m freestyle
Silver medal – second place	2018 Algiers	4×100 m mixed medley
Silver medal – second place	2021 Accra	50 m backstroke
Silver medal – second place	2024 Luanda	4×100 m mixed medley
Bronze medal – third place	2021 Accra	100 m freestyle
Bronze medal – third place	2016 Bloemfontein	4×100 m medley
Bronze medal – third place	2016 Bloemfontein	4×100 m mixed freestyle
Bronze medal – third place	2016 Bloemfontein	4×100 m mixed medley
Bronze medal – third place	2018 Algiers	50 m freestyle
Bronze medal – third place	2018 Algiers	50 m backstroke
Bronze medal – third place	2018 Algiers	50 m butterfly
Bronze medal – third place	2018 Algiers	4×100 m freestyle
Bronze medal – third place	2018 Algiers	4×100 m medley
Bronze medal – third place	2018 Algiers	4×100 m mixed freestyle
African Games
Bronze medal – third place	2011 Maputo	50 m backstroke
Bronze medal – third place	2011 Maputo	100 m backstroke
Bronze medal – third place	2011 Maputo	4×100 m freestyle
Bronze medal – third place	2011 Maputo	4×200 m freestyle
Bronze medal – third place	2011 Maputo	4×100 m medley
Bronze medal – third place	2019 Rabat	4×100 m freestyle
Bronze medal – third place	2019 Rabat	4×200 m freestyle
Bronze medal – third place	2019 Rabat	4×100 m mixed freestyle
Islamic Solidarity Games
Silver medal – second place	2017 Baku	50 m freestyle
Bronze medal – third place	2017 Baku	50 m backstroke
Bronze medal – third place	2017 Baku	100 m backstroke

Amel Melih (Arabic: آمال مليح; born 6 October 1993) is an Algerian swimmer. She represented Algeria at the 2020 Summer Olympics. Her time of 25.77 in the women's 50m freestyle was not enough to advance out of the heats and she finished in 35th place overall. She finished 39th overall in the women's 100m freestyle with a time of 56.65. She was the flag bearer for Algeria during the opening ceremony along with Mohamed Flissi.

She represented Algeria at the 2022 Mediterranean Games held in Oran, Algeria.

Olympic Games
Preceded by Sonia Asselah	Flag bearer for Algeria; 2020 Tokyo with Mohamed Flissi	Succeeded by Yasser Triki; Amina Belkadi
