= List of Ghanaian records in swimming =

The Ghanaian records in swimming are the fastest ever performances of swimmers from Ghana, which are recognised and ratified by the Ghana Swimming Association.

All records were set in finals unless noted otherwise.

== Long Course (50 m) ==
=== Men ===
Event	Time		Name	Club	Date	Meet	Location	Ref
50 m freestyle	22.92		Abeiku Jackson	Ghana	March 2020	African Zone 2 Championships	Accra, Ghana	
100 m freestyle	50.67		Harry Stacey	Ghana	30 April 2024	African Championships	Luanda, Angola	
200 m freestyle	2:04.76		Abeiku Jackson	Ghana	June 2016	45th International Pfingstschwimmfest	Arnsberg, Germany	
400 m freestyle	5:47.85	h	Christian Nortey	Ghana	11 March 2024	African Games	Accra, Ghana	
800 m freestyle								
1500 m freestyle								
50 m backstroke	26.48	h	Abeiku Jackson	Ghana	24 July 2026	Commonwealth Games	Glasgow, United Kingdom	
100 m backstroke	56.52	h	Jason Arthur	Ghana	5 April 2018	Commonwealth Games	Gold Coast, Australia	
200 m backstroke	2:03.91	h	Jason Arthur	Ghana	9 April 2018	Commonwealth Games	Gold Coast, Australia	
50 m breaststroke	30.90	h	Harry Stacey	Ghana	12 March 2024	African Games	Accra, Ghana	
100 m breaststroke	1:17.94	h	Ivan Snowden	Ghana	10 March 2024	African Games	Accra, Ghana	
200 m breaststroke	3:08.58	h	Hector Ankrah	Ghana	11 March 2024	African Games	Accra, Ghana	
50 m butterfly	23.87		Abeiku Jackson	Ghana	21 June 2024	BRICS Games	Kazan, Russia	
100 m butterfly	53.08		Abeiku Jackson	Ghana	19 June 2024	BRICS Games	Kazan, Russia	
200 m butterfly	2:11.75		Abeiku Jackson	Ghana	March 2020	Africa Zone 2 Championships	Accra, Ghana	
200 m individual medley	2:07.44	h	Jason Arthur	Ghana	10 April 2018	Commonwealth Games	Gold Coast, Australia	
400 m individual medley								
4×100 m freestyle relay	3:37.05		Harry Stacey (50.95); Niklas Yeboah (56.70); Kow Jackson (56.63); Jackson Abeku (52.77)	Ghana	12 March 2024	African Games	Accra, Ghana	
4×200 m freestyle relay								
4×100 m medley relay	4:04.98	h	Niklas Yeboah (1:05.81); Harry Stacey (1:09.22); Jackson Abeku (54.15); Kow Jackson (55.80)	Ghana	13 March 2024	African Games	Accra, Ghana	

Legend: # – Record awaiting ratification by Ghana Swimming Association; WR – World record; AF – African record; e – equalled existing record;
Records not set in finals: h – heat; sf – semifinal; r – relay 1st leg; rh – relay heat 1st leg; b – B final; † – en route to final mark; so – swim-off; tt – time trial

=== Women ===
Event	Time		Name	Club	Date	Meet	Location	Ref
50 m freestyle	26.48	h	Joselle Mensah	Ghana	2 August 2025	World Championships	Singapore, Singapore	
100 m freestyle	58.98	h	Joselle Mensah	Ghana	31 July 2025	World Championships	Singapore, Singapore	
200 m freestyle	2:13.02	r	Kaya Forson	R.C. Mediterráneo	13 July 2019	Andalusian Championships	Mairena del Aljarafe, Spain	
400 m freestyle								
800 m freestyle								
1500 m freestyle								
50 m backstroke	30.62		Nubia Adjei	Ghana	11 March 2024	African Games	Accra, Ghana	
100 m backstroke	1:09.26		Nubia Adjei	Ghana	6 March 2020	African Zone 2 Championships	Accra, Ghana	
200 m backstroke	2:28.70	h	Kaya Forson	R.C. Mediterráneo	23 July 2016	Andalusian Championships	Málaga, Spain	
50 m breaststroke	33.73	h	Joselle Mensah	Ghana	12 March 2024	African Games	Accra, Ghana	
100 m breaststroke	1:24.02		Unilez Takye	Ghana	21 August 2022	African Championships	Tunis, Tunisia	
200 m breaststroke								
50 m butterfly	29.14	h	Joselle Mensah	Ghana	10 March 2024	African Games	Accra, Ghana	
100 m butterfly	1:13.40	tt	Zaira Forson	R.C. Mediterráneo	4 May 2019	Andalusian Circuit	Fuengirola, Spain	
200 m butterfly	2:39.20	h	Zaira Forson	Ghana	24 July 2019	World Championships	Gwangju, South Korea	
200 m individual medley	2:34.59	h	Kaya Forson	Ghana	21 July 2019	World Championships	Gwangju, South Korea	
400 m individual medley								
4×100 m freestyle relay								
4×200 m freestyle relay								
4×100 m medley relay								

Legend: # – Record awaiting ratification by Ghana Swimming Association; WR – World record; AF – African record; e – equalled existing record;
Records not set in finals: h – heat; sf – semifinal; r – relay 1st leg; rh – relay heat 1st leg; b – B final; † – en route to final mark; so – swim-off; tt – time trial

=== Mixed relay ===
Event	Time	Name	Club	Date	Meet	Location	Ref
4×100 m freestyle relay	3:42.97	Harry Stacey (51.78); Abeiku Jackson (51.72); Unilez Takyi Unilez (1:00.90); Joselle Mensah (58.57)	Ghana	9 March 2024	African Games	Accra, Ghana	
4×100 m medley relay	4:09.33	Nubia Adjei (1:09.53); Harry Stacey (1:07.61); Abeiku Jackson (54.06); Joselle Mensah (58.13)	Ghana	10 March 2024	African Games	Accra, Ghana	

Legend: # – Record awaiting ratification by Ghana Swimming Association; WR – World record; AF – African record; e – equalled existing record;
Records not set in finals: h – heat; so – swim-off

== Short Course (25 m) ==
=== Men ===
Event	Time		Name	Club	Date	Meet	Location	Ref
50 m freestyle	21.68	h	Harry Stacey	Seminole	29 October 2026	World Championship Trials	Westmont, United States	
100 m freestyle	48.06	h	Harry Stacey	Ghana	18 October 2025	World Cup	Westmont, United States	
200 m freestyle								
400 m freestyle								
800 m freestyle								
1500 m freestyle								
50 m backstroke								
100 m backstroke								
200 m backstroke								
50 m breaststroke	38.18	h	Ebenezer Osabutey	Ghana	15 December 2018	World Championships	Hangzhou, China	
100 m breaststroke	1:24.49	h	Ebenezer Osabutey	Ghana	11 December 2018	World Championships	Hangzhou, China	
200 m breaststroke								
50 m butterfly	23.02	h	Harry Stacey	Ghana	19 October 2025	World Cup	Westmont, United States	
100 m butterfly	52.36	h	Abeiku Jackson	Ghana	17 December 2022	World Championships	Melbourne, Australia	
200 m butterfly								
100 m individual medley								
200 m individual medley								
400 m individual medley								
4×50 m freestyle relay								
4×100 m freestyle relay								
4×200 m freestyle relay								
4×50 m medley relay								
4×100 m medley relay								

Legend: # – Record awaiting ratification by Ghana Swimming Association; WR – World record; AF – African record; e – equalled existing record;
Records not set in finals: h – heat; sf – semifinal; r – relay 1st leg; rh – relay heat 1st leg; b – B final; † – en route to final mark; so – swim-off; tt – time trial

=== Women ===
Event	Time		Name	Club	Date	Meet	Location	Ref
50 m freestyle	27.21	h	Unilez Takyi	Ghana	20 December 2021	World Championships	Abu Dhabi, United Arab Emirates	
100 m freestyle	59.09	h	Kaya Forson	R.C. Mediterráneo	4 November 2018	Algarve International Meeting	Vila Real de Santo António, Portugal	
200 m freestyle								
400 m freestyle								
800 m freestyle								
1500 m freestyle								
50 m backstroke	29.96	h	Nubia Adjei	Ghana	15 December 2022	World Championships	Melbourne, Australia	
100 m backstroke								
200 m backstroke								
50 m breaststroke								
100 m breaststroke								
200 m breaststroke								
50 m butterfly	29.11	h	Nubia Adjei	Ghana	13 December 2022	World Championships	Melbourne, Australia	
100 m butterfly								
200 m butterfly								
100 m individual medley								
200 m individual medley	2:31.46	h	Kaya Forson	Ghana	11 December 2018	World Championships	Hangzhou, China	
400 m individual medley								
4×50 m freestyle relay								
4×100 m freestyle relay								
4×200 m freestyle relay								
4×50 m medley relay								
4×100 m medley relay								

Legend: # – Record awaiting ratification by Ghana Swimming Association; WR – World record; AF – African record; e – equalled existing record;
Records not set in finals: h – heat; sf – semifinal; r – relay 1st leg; rh – relay heat 1st leg; b – B final; † – en route to final mark; so – swim-off; tt – time trial
