= 2016 FINA World Swimming Championships (25 m) – Men's 50 metre butterfly =

Men's 50 metre butterfly at the 2016 FINA World Swimming Championships (25 m)
- Venue: WFCU Centre
- Dates: 9 December (heats and semifinals); 10 December (final)
- Competitors: 110 from 86 nations
- Winning time: 21.98

Medalists
gold medal	Chad Le Clos	South Africa
silver medal	Tom Shields	United States
bronze medal	David Morgan	Australia

The Men's 50 metre butterfly competition of the 2016 FINA World Swimming Championships (25 m) was held on 9 and 10 December 2016.

== Records ==
Prior to the competition, the existing world and championship records were as follows.

	Name	Nation	Time	Location	Date
World record	Steffen Deibler	Germany	21.80	Berlin	14 November 2009
Championship record	Chad le Clos	South Africa	21.95	Doha	6 December 2014

== Results ==
=== Heats ===
The heats were held at 10:01.

Rank	Heat	Lane	Name	Nationality	Time	Notes
1	12	5	Nicholas Santos	Brazil	22.53	Q
2	11	3	Takeshi Kawamoto	Japan	22.62	Q
3	11	4	Aleksandr Popkov	Russia	22.68	Q
4	12	3	David Morgan	Australia	22.69	Q
5	9	5	Albert Subirats	Venezuela	22.75	Q
6	13	5	Adam Barrett	Great Britain	22.76	Q
7	11	5	Tom Shields	United States	22.79	Q
8	13	4	Chad Le Clos	South Africa	22.84	Q
9	11	0	Dylan Carter	Trinidad and Tobago	22.85	Q
9	13	3	Yauhen Tsurkin	Belarus	22.85	Q
11	8	3	Daniel Carranza	Mexico	22.89	Q
12	13	7	Andriy Khloptsov	Ukraine	23.01	Q
13	12	4	Andriy Hovorov	Ukraine	23.07	Q
14	13	6	Pavel Sankovich	Belarus	23.09	WD
15	13	2	Daniil Pakhomov	Russia	23.11	Q
16	13	8	Mindaugas Sadauskas	Lithuania	23.22	Q
17	12	1	Miguel Ortiz-Cañavate	Spain	23.27	WD
18	12	2	Li Zhuhao	China	23.29	Q
19	11	2	Riku Poytakivi	Finland	23.30	
20	10	7	Marius Kusch	Germany	23.39	
21	12	7	Brad Tandy	South Africa	23.40	
22	11	7	Deividas Margevicius	Lithuania	23.42	
23	13	0	Ryan Pini	Papua New Guinea	23.46	
24	12	9	Benjamin Hockin	Paraguay	23.48	
25	11	1	Matthew Josa	United States	23.49	
26	12	8	Jesper Björk	Sweden	23.62	
27	8	5	Nao Horomura	Japan	23.69	
28	13	9	Mislav Sever	Croatia	23.74	
29	10	5	Magnus Jakupsson	Denmark	23.77	
30	10	1	Iskender Baskalov	Turkey	23.81	
31	10	0	Justin Plaschka	Jamaica	23.92	
32	10	2	Kristian Golomeev	Greece	23.93	
33	10	9	Adam Halas	Slovakia	23.98	
34	9	8	Ralph Goveia	Zambia	24.00	
35	10	4	Marcos Barale	Argentina	24.12	
36	9	3	Oliver Elliot	Chile	24.17	
36	10	3	Antani Ivanov	Bulgaria	24.17	
38	8	4	Bryan Alvarez	Costa Rica	24.20	
39	10	8	Chun Nam Derick Ng	Hong Kong	24.21	
40	9	1	Pavel Izbisciuc	Moldova	24.23	
41	1	3	Yonel Govindin	France	24.25	
42	10	6	Anthony Barbar	Lebanon	24.33	
43	1	1	Norbert Trandafir	Romania	24.37	
44	11	9	Adi Mesetovic	Bosnia and Herzegovina	24.39	
45	7	5	Ho Lun Raymond Mak	Hong Kong	24.49	
46	5	0	Mackenzie Darragh	Canada	24.54	
47	7	2	Gabriel Lopes	Portugal	24.58	
48	9	7	Ljupcho Angelovski	Macedonia	24.69	
49	9	4	Dylan Koo	Singapore	24.73	
50	1	2	Igor Mogne	Mozambique	24.81	
51	9	2	Ivan Cocunubo	Canada	24.83	
52	8	0	Navaphat Wongcharoen	Thailand	24.92	
53	8	1	Jhonny Pérez	Dominican Republic	24.97	
54	7	1	Jordy Groters	Aruba	24.99	
55	8	6	Ivo Kunzle Savastano	Paraguay	25.05	
56	7	3	Ivan Soruco	Bolivia	25.06	
56	7	8	João Matias	Angola	25.06	
58	8	2	Sam Seghers	Papua New Guinea	25.19	
59	9	9	Adam Ismail Allouche	Algeria	25.21	
60	7	7	Issa Abdulla Hemed Mohamed	Kenya	25.26	
61	7	9	Adrian Hoek	Curaçao	25.28	
62	6	1	Noah Abdulaziz Al-Khulaifi	Qatar	25.39	
63	5	8	Akaki Vashakidze	Georgia	25.51	
64	7	6	Jean Pierre Monteagudo	Peru	25.56	
65	6	5	Keanan Michael Dols	Jamaica	25.58	
66	6	3	Abdoul Niane	Senegal	25.67	
67	5	3	Hannibal David Gaskin	Guyana	25.71	
68	8	9	Ka Kun Sio	Macau	25.84	
69	6	2	James Sanderson	Gibraltar	25.88	
69	6	6	Christian Nikles	Brunei	25.88	
71	6	4	Delgerkhuu Myagmar	Mongolia	25.91	
71	6	7	Yeziel Morales Miranda	Puerto Rico	25.91	
73	6	0	Hilal Hemed Hilal	Tanzania	25.96	
73	7	0	Stefano Mitchell	Antigua and Barbuda	25.96	
75	5	2	Xander Skinner	Namibia	25.97	
76	6	8	Abdullah Al-Doori	Iraq	26.00	
77	5	1	Mathieu Marquet	Mauritius	26.05	
78	1	6	Sébastien Kouma	Mali	26.08	
78	1	7	Michael Stafrace	Malta	26.08	
80	5	7	George Jabbour	Honduras	26.19	
81	4	2	Matthew Ives	Botswana	26.36	
82	4	4	Matt Dylan Savitz	Gibraltar	26.47	
83	5	5	Vahan Mkhitaryan	Armenia	26.61	
84	5	4	Nuno Miguel Rola	Angola	26.64	
85	5	6	Jeremy Bryan Lim	Philippines	26.74	
86	4	7	Rainier Rafaela	Curaçao	26.76	
87	9	0	Teimuraz Kobakhidze	Georgia	26.87	
88	5	9	Arnold Kisulo	Uganda	27.35	
89	4	3	Andrew Fowler	Guyana	27.40	
89	4	5	Issa Abdullah Hemed Mohamed	Kenya	27.40	
91	2	5	Temaruata Strickland	Cook Islands	27.58	
91	4	6	Meriton Veliu	Kosovo	27.58	
93	3	3	Nabeel Hatoum	Palestine	27.63	
94	4	1	Mark Hoare	Eswatini	28.12	
95	4	0	Cruz Halbich	Saint Vincent and the Grenadines	28.49	
96	2	9	Salofi Charles Welch	Northern Mariana Islands	28.67	
97	3	7	Sergey Sihanouvong	Laos	28.84	
98	2	3	Michael Swift	Malawi	29.02	
99	4	9	Tommy Imazu	Guam	29.18	
100	3	2	Christian Villacrusis	Northern Mariana Islands	29.33	
101	1	4	Alassane Seydou	Niger	29.38	
101	3	1	Albarchir Mouctar	Niger	29.38	
103	3	6	Fakhriddin Madkamov	Tajikistan	29.62	
104	1	5	Ismail Muthasim Adnan	Maldives	29.79	
105	3	4	Slava Sihanouvong	Laos	29.81	
106	2	4	Dennis Hamis Mhini	Tanzania	30.45	
107	2	6	Pap Jonga	Gambia	30.58	
108	3	8	Aaron de Freitas	Saint Vincent and the Grenadines	31.17	
109	2	1	Simphiwe Dlamini	Eswatini	32.39	
110	2	0	Christian Nassif	Central African Republic	35.88	
	2	2	Athoumane Athoumane	Comoros		DNS
	2	7	Saidu Kamara	Sierra Leone		DNS
	2	8	Komora Ishmael	Sierra Leone		DNS
	3	0	Chaoili Aonzoudine	Comoros		DNS
	3	5	Djalonka Koulibaly	Guinea		DNS
	3	9	Mamadou Diallo	Guinea		DNS
	4	8	Belly-Cresus Ganira	Burundi		DNS
	6	9	Paul Elaisa	Fiji		DNS
	7	4	Thibaut Danho	Ivory Coast		DNS
	8	7	Meli Malani	Fiji		DNS
	8	8	Abeiku Jackson	Ghana		DNS
	9	6	Viktor Bromer	Denmark		DNS
	11	6	Mehdy Metella	France		DNS
	11	8	Artyom Kozlyuk	Uzbekistan		DNS
	12	0	Jonathan Gómez	Colombia		DNS
	12	6	Jesse Puts	Netherlands		DNS
	13	1	Tommaso D'Orsogna	Australia		DNS

=== Semifinals ===
The semifinals were held at 19:02.

==== Semifinal 1 ====
Rank	Lane	Name	Nationality	Time	Notes
1	6	Chad Le Clos	South Africa	22.41	Q
2	5	David Morgan	Australia	22.62	Q
3	4	Takeshi Kawamoto	Japan	22.74	Q
4	2	Yauhen Tsurkin	Belarus	22.82	
5	7	Andriy Khloptsov	Ukraine	22.88	
6	3	Adam Barrett	Great Britain	22.92	
7	1	Daniil Pakhomov	Russia	23.00	
8	8	Li Zhuhao	China	23.52	

==== Semifinal 2 ====
Rank	Lane	Name	Nationality	Time	Notes
1	6	Tom Shields	United States	22.38	Q
2	2	Dylan Carter	Trinidad and Tobago	22.53	Q
3	5	Aleksandr Popkov	Russia	22.69	Q
4	1	Andriy Hovorov	Ukraine	22.70	Q
5	2	Albert Subirats	Venezuela	22.76	Q
6	4	Nicholas Santos	Brazil	22.82	
7	8	Mindaugas Sadauskas	Lithuania	22.87	
8	7	Daniel Carranza	Mexico	22.96	

=== Final ===
The final was held at 19:10

Rank	Lane	Name	Nationality	Time	Notes
1st place, gold medalist(s)	5	Chad Le Clos	South Africa	21.98	
2nd place, silver medalist(s)	4	Tom Shields	United States	22.40	
3rd place, bronze medalist(s)	6	David Morgan	Australia	22.47	
4	7	Andriy Hovorov	Ukraine	22.55	
5	2	Aleksandr Popkov	Russia	22.56	
6	8	Albert Subirats	Venezuela	22.62	
7	3	Dylan Carter	Trinidad and Tobago	22.68	
8	1	Takeshi Kawamoto	Japan	22.84	
