= List of Zambian records in swimming =

The Zambian records in swimming are the fastest ever performances of swimmers from Zambia, which are recognised and ratified by the Zambia Amateur Swimming Union.

All records were set in finals unless noted otherwise.

== Long Course (50 m) ==
=== Men ===
Event	Time		Name	Club	Date	Meet	Location	Ref
50 m freestyle	23.36	h	Damien Shamambo	Zambia	25 July 2026	Commonwealth Games	Glasgow, United Kingdom	
100 m freestyle	52.62		Tom Donker	Zambia	April 2016	CANA Zone IV Championships	Mauritius	
200 m freestyle	1:57.24		Tom Donker	Zambia	April 2016	CANA Zone IV Championships	Mauritius	
400 m freestyle	4:09.69	h	Mulenga Cole	Zambia	19 August 2025	World Junior Championships	Otopeni, Romania	
800 m freestyle	8:33.55		Ralph Goveia	-		-		
1500 m freestyle								
50 m backstroke	27.40		Tom Donker	Zambia	21 April 2016	CANA Zone IV Championships	Mauritius	
100 m backstroke	58.66		Tom Donker	Zambia	16 February 2017	CANA Zone IV Championships	Bulawayo, Zimbabwe	
200 m backstroke	2:12.34		Tom Donker	Zambia	April 2016	CANA Zone IV Championships	Mauritius	
50 m breaststroke	28.49		Zach Moyo	Nova Cent'n	29 March 2026	Legacy Meet	London, United Kingdom	
100 m breaststroke	1:05.01	h	Zach Moyo	Zambia	24 July 2026	Commonwealth Games	Glasgow, United Kingdom	
200 m breaststroke	2:34.43	h	Alexandros Axiotis	Zambia	1 August 2013	World Championships	Barcelona, Spain	
50 m butterfly	24.49	sf	Ralph Goveia	Zambia	5 April 2018	Commonwealth Games	Gold Coast, Australia	
100 m butterfly	54.10	sf	Ralph Goveia	Zambia	8 April 2018	Commonwealth Games	Gold Coast, Australia	
200 m butterfly	2:02.36	'#' (Note: citizenship unclear)	Moisés Saldívar Guzmán	Anv Puebla	21 February 2025	Segunda Copa Internacional	Veracruz, Mexico	
200 m individual medley	2:13.12	h	Ralph Goveia	Zambia	11 September 2015	African Games	Brazzaville, Congo	
400 m individual medley								
4×100 m freestyle relay	3:49.62	h	Ralph Goveia (55.05); Matthew Shone (58.75); Milimo Mweetwa (1:00.33); Alexandros Axiotis (55.49)	Zambia	25 July 2014	Commonwealth Games	Glasgow, United Kingdom	
4×200 m freestyle relay								
4×100 m medley relay	4:12.10	h	Milimo Mweetwa (1:08.70); Alexandros Axiotis (1:08.02); Ralph Goveia (57.69); Matthew Shone (57.69)	Zambia	29 July 2014	Commonwealth Games	Glasgow, United Kingdom	

Legend: # – Record awaiting ratification by Zambia Amateur Swimming Union; WR – World record; AF – African record;
Records not set in finals: h – heat; sf – semifinal; r – relay 1st leg; rh – relay heat 1st leg; b – B final; † – en route to final mark; so – swim-off; tt – time trial

=== Women ===
Event	Time		Name	Club	Date	Meet	Location	Ref
50 m freestyle	26.27		Mia Phiri	Zambia	13 March 2024	African Games	Accra, Ghana	
100 m freestyle	58.47	h	Jade Howard	Zambia	10 August 2016	Olympic Games	Rio de Janeiro, Brazil	
200 m freestyle								
400 m freestyle								
800 m freestyle								
1500 m freestyle								
50 m backstroke	29.17		Mia Phiri	Zambia	11 March 2024	African Games	Accra, Ghana	
100 m backstroke	1:04.05		Mia Phiri	Zambia	12 March 2024	African Games	Accra, Ghana	
200 m backstroke	2:35.92	h	Marlise Findlay	Zambia	9 December 2023	African Junior Championships	Saint Pierre, Mauritius	
50 m breaststroke	32.05	sf	Tilka Paljk	Zambia	5 April 2018	Commonwealth Games	Gold Coast, Australia	
100 m breaststroke	1:12.01	h	Tilka Paljk	Zambia	8 April 2018	Commonwealth Games	Gold Coast, Australia	
200 m breaststroke	2:55.98	h	Tilka Paljk	Zambia	6 August 2015	World Championships	Kazan, Russia	
50 m butterfly	27.57		Mia Phiri	Zambia	10 March 2024	African Games	Accra, Ghana	
100 m butterfly	1:03.62		Mia Phiri	East Carolina Aquatics	29 March 2024	ISCA International Senior Cup	St. Petersburg, United States	
200 m butterfly	3:06.91		Mia Phiri	Zambia	19 February 2017	CANA Zone IV Championships	Bulawayo, Zimbabwe	
200 m individual medley	2:39.91		Mia Phiri	Zambia	23 February 2020	CANA Zone IV Championships	Gaborone, Botswana	
400 m individual medley								
4×100 m freestyle relay	4:18.18			Zambia	6 December 2023	African Junior Championships	Mauritius, Mauritius	
4×200 m freestyle relay								
4×100 m medley relay								

Legend: # – Record awaiting ratification by Zambia Amateur Swimming Union; WR – World record; AF – African record;
Records not set in finals: h – heat; sf – semifinal; r – relay 1st leg; rh – relay heat 1st leg; b – B final; † – en route to final mark; so – swim-off; tt – time trial

=== Mixed relay ===
Event	Time		Name	Club	Date	Meet	Location	Ref
4×100 m freestyle relay								
4×100 m medley relay	4:27.78	h	Moonarala Naidu (1:08.34); Tilka Palik (1:15.70); Ralph Goveia (56.80); Lombe Mwape (1:06.94)	Zambia	22 August 2019	African Games	Casablanca, Morocco	

Legend: # – Record awaiting ratification by Zambia Amateur Swimming Union; WR – World record; AF – African record;
Records not set in finals: h – heat; so – swim-off

== Short Course (25 m) ==
=== Men ===
Event	Time		Name	Club	Date	Meet	Location	Ref
50 m freestyle	23.27	h	Ralph Goveia	Zambia	8 December 2016	World Championships	Windsor, Canada	
100 m freestyle	52.94	h	Mulenga Cole	Zambia	5 July 2025	Region 5 Games	Swakopmund, Namibia	
200 m freestyle	1:52.38		Mulenga Cole	Zambia	6 July 2025	Region 5 Games	Swakopmund, Namibia	
400 m freestyle	3:57.93		Mulenga Cole	Zambia	8 July 2025	Region 5 Games	Swakopmund, Namibia	
800 m freestyle	9:13.38		Naested Smit	Zambia	21 March 2018	CANA Zone IV Championships	Lilongwe, Malawi	
1500 m freestyle								
50 m backstroke	27.60	h	Alexandros Axiotis	Zambia	30 September 2014	FINA World Cup Event 3	Hong Kong, Hong Kong	
100 m backstroke	59.79	h	Alexandros Axiotis	Zambia	29 September 2014	FINA World Cup Event 3	Hong Kong, Hong Kong	
200 m backstroke	2:11.30	h	Mulenga Cole	Zambia	7 July 2025	Region 5 Games	Swakopmund, Namibia	
50m breaststroke	28.02	h	Zach Moyo	Zambia	14 December 2024	World Championships	Budapest, Hungary	
100m breaststroke	1:02.15	h	Zach Moyo	Zambia	11 December 2024	World Championships	Budapest, Hungary	
200m breaststroke	2:27.41		Alexandros Axiotis	Zambia	19 October 2017	CANA Zone III Championships	Dar es Salaam, Tanzania	
50m butterfly	24.00	h	Ralph Goveia	Zambia	9 December 2016	World Championships	Windsor, Canada	
100m butterfly	53.63	h	Ralph Goveia	Zambia	7 December 2016	World Championships	Windsor, Canada	
200m butterfly	2:15.01		Naested Smit	Zambia	24 March 2018	CANA Zone IV Championships	Lilongwe, Malawi	
100m individual medley	57.15	h	Ralph Goveia	Zambia	8 December 2016	World Championships	Windsor, Canada	
200m individual medley	2:07.82		Mulenga Cole	Zambia	7 July 2025	Region 5 Games	Swakopmund, Namibia	
400m individual medley								
4×50m freestyle relay	1:41.72		Thomas Savory; Matthew Shone; Milimo Mweetwa; Mulenga Kangololo	Zambia	27 April 2014	CANA Zone III & IV Championships	Kampala, Uganda	
4×100m freestyle relay	3:47.80		Thomas Savory; Mulenga Kangololo; Milimo Mweetwa; Matthew Shone	Zambia	25 April 2014	CANA Zone III & IV Championships	Kampala, Uganda	
4×200m freestyle relay								
4×50m medley relay	1:51.92		Naested Smit (28.37); Kumaren Naidu (31.12); Darren Van Rensburg (27.61); Mapalo Mataka (24.82)	Zambia	21 March 2018	CANA Zone IV Championships	Lilongwe, Malawi	
4×100m medley relay								

Legend: # – Record awaiting ratification by Zambia Amateur Swimming Union; WR – World record; AF – African record;
Records not set in finals: h – heat; sf – semifinal; r – relay 1st leg; rh – relay heat 1st leg; b – B final; † – en route to final mark; so – swim-off; tt – time trial

=== Women ===
Event	Time		Name	Club	Date	Meet	Location	Ref
50 m freestyle	26.15	h	Jade Howard	Zambia	11 December 2016	World Championships	Windsor, Canada	
100 m freestyle	57.50	h	Jade Howard	Zambia	7 December 2016	World Championships	Windsor, Canada	
200 m freestyle	2:11.95		Jade Phiri	Co Manch Aq	22 June 2025	Wigan Best Future Stars Summer Meet	Wigan, United Kingdom	
400 m freestyle	4:41.58		Jade Phiri	Co Manch Aq	21 June 2025	Wigan Best Future Stars Summer Meet	Wigan, United Kingdom	
800 m freestyle	10:16.43		Mia Phiri	Zambia	18 October 2017	CANA Zone III Championships	Dar es Salaam, Tanzania	
1500 m freestyle								
50m backstroke	29.79	h	Jade Howard	Zambia	9 December 2016	World Championships	Windsor, Canada	
100m backstroke	1:04.35	h	Jade Howard	Zambia	6 December 2016	World Championships	Windsor, Canada	
200m backstroke	2:26.50		Mia Phiri	Zambia	23 March 2018	CANA Zone IV Championships	Lilongwe, Malawi	
50m breaststroke	31.74		Tilka Paljk	Zambia	21 March 2018	CANA Zone IV Championships	Lilongwe, Malawi	
100m breaststroke	1:10.17		Tilka Paljk	Zambia	23 March 2018	CANA Zone IV Championships	Lilongwe, Malawi	
200m breaststroke	2:39.00		Tilka Paljk	Zambia	22 March 2018	CANA Zone IV Championships	Lilongwe, Malawi	
50 m butterfly	28.12	b	Jade Phiri	Co Manch Aq	16 November 2024	BUCS Championships	Sheffield, United Kingdom	
100 m butterfly	1:03.19	h	Jade Phiri	Co Manch Aq	1 November 2025	SENW Regional Winter Championships	Manchester, United Kingdom	
200 m butterfly	2:37.86		Mia Phiri	Zambia	19 October 2017	CANA Zone III Championships	Dar es Salaam, Tanzania	
100m individual medley	1:07.48	h	Ellen Lendra Hight	Zambia	10 April 2008	World Championships	Manchester, Great Britain	
200m individual medley	2:24.15		Tilka Paljk	Zambia	24 March 2018	CANA Zone IV Championships	Lilongwe, Malawi	
400m individual medley								
4×50m freestyle relay	1:54.54		Johanna Buys (27.64); Elizabeth Buys (29.48); Victora Cowles (30.78); Tilka Paljk (26.64)	Zambia	24 March 2018	CANA Zone IV Championships	Lilongwe, Malawi	
4×100m freestyle relay	4:11.47		Tilka Paljk (59.31); Johanna Buys (1:01.96); Elizabeth Buys (1:05.65); Chibwe Chungu (1:04.55)	Zambia	22 March 2018	CANA Zone IV Championships	Lilongwe, Malawi	
4×200m freestyle relay								
4×50m medley relay	2:04.42		Abigail Joubert (34.46); Tilka Paljk (31.81); Johanna Buys (29.19); Chibwe Chungu (28.96)	Zambia	21 March 2018	CANA Zone IV Championships	Lilongwe, Malawi	
4×100m medley relay								

Legend: # – Record awaiting ratification by Zambia Amateur Swimming Union; WR – World record; AF – African record;
Records not set in finals: h – heat; sf – semifinal; r – relay 1st leg; rh – relay heat 1st leg; b – B final; † – en route to final mark; so – swim-off; tt – time trial

=== Mixed relay ===
Event	Time		Name	Club	Date	Meet	Location	Ref
4×50 m freestyle relay								
4×50 m medley relay	1:50.01	h	Jade Howard (30.08); Alex Axiotis (29.32); Ralph Goveia (24.20); Tilka Paljk (26.41)	Zambia	8 December 2016	World Championships	Windsor, Canada	
4×100 m medley relay	4:15.22		Naested Smit (1:01.87); Tilka Paljk (1:11.43); Johanna Buys (1:07.18); Mapalo Mataka (54.74)	Zambia	23 March 2018	CANA Zone IV Championships	Lilongwe, Malawi	

Legend: # – Record awaiting ratification by Zambia Amateur Swimming Union; WR – World record; AF – African record;
Records not set in finals: h – heat; so – swim-off
