= Abeiku Jackson =

Ghanaian swimmer (born 2000)

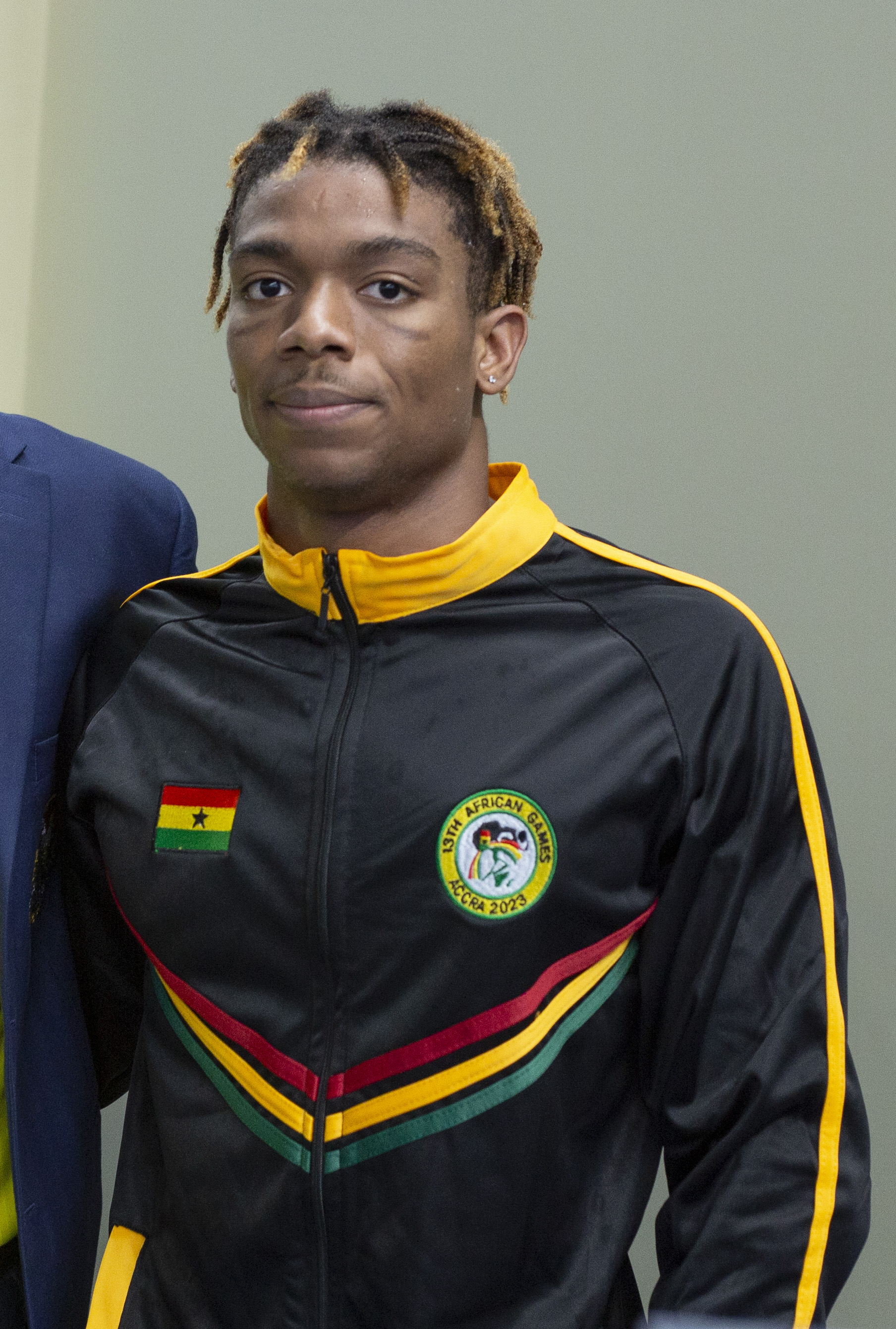
- Jackson in 2024

Personal information
- Full name: Abeiku Gyekye Jackson
- Born: 12 April 2000 (age 26) Accra, Ghana
- Education: Roman Ridge School
- Height: 170 cm (5 ft 7 in)

Sport
- Sport: Swimming
- Events: 50m and 100m freestyle 50m and 100m butterfly
Medal record
Men's swimming
Representing Ghana
African Championships
Silver medal – second place	2021 Accra	50 m butterfly
Bronze medal – third place	2021 Accra	100 m butterfly
Gold medal – first place	2022 Tunis	100 m butterfly
Silver medal – second place	2022 Tunis	50 m butterfly

Abeiku Gyekye Jackson (also spelled Abeku, born 12 April 2000 in Accra) is a Ghanaian swimmer specialising in the 50 and 100 metre butterfly. He competed in the 100m freestyle, 50m butterfly, and 100m butterfly at the 2014 Commonwealth Games. He holds Ghanaian national records in 13 disciplines, including freestyle, butterfly, breaststroke and backstroke events over distances from 50 to 400 metres. His older brother Kwesi Abbiw Jackson and younger brother Kow Asafua Jackson are also swimmers.

Jackson represented Ghana in the 50 metre freestyle at the 2016 Summer Olympics in Rio de Janeiro, Brazil. Jackson and female swimmer Kaya Forson, who competed in the 200 metre freestyle in Rio, became the first Ghanaians ever to compete in swimming at the Olympic Games.

He competed in the men's 100 metre butterfly event at the 2020 Summer Olympics.

== Competition record ==
=== Individual ===
==== Long course ====
Year	Competition	Venue	Position	Event	Notes
Representing Ghana
2014	Commonwealth Games	(United Kingdom) Glasgow, Great Britain	44th (h)	100 m freestyle	56.47
2014	Commonwealth Games	(United Kingdom) Glasgow, Great Britain	33rd (h)	50 m butterfly	27.21
2014	Commonwealth Games	(United Kingdom) Glasgow, Great Britain	31st (h)	100 m butterfly	1:01.40
2015	World Championships	Kazan, Russia	70th (h)	50 m freestyle	24.72
2015	World Championships	Kazan, Russia	98th (h)	100 m freestyle	56.94
2015	World Championships	Kazan, Russia	55th (h)	50 m butterfly	26.41
2016	Olympic Games	Rio de Janeiro, Brazil	55th (h)	50 m freestyle	24.30
2017	World Championships	Budapest, Hungary	-	100 m freestyle	DNS
2017	World Championships	Budapest, Hungary	-	50 m butterfly	DNS
2018	Commonwealth Games	Gold Coast, Australia	24th (h)	50 m freestyle	23.47
2018	Commonwealth Games	Gold Coast, Australia	16th (sf)	50 m butterfly	24.86
2018	Commonwealth Games	Gold Coast, Australia	15th (sf)	100 m butterfly	54.79
2018	African Championships	Algiers, Algeria	8th	50 m freestyle	23.97
2018	African Championships	Algiers, Algeria	8th	100 m freestyle	53.44
2018	African Championships	Algiers, Algeria	5th	50 m butterfly	24.68
2018	African Championships	Algiers, Algeria	5th	100 m butterfly	55.18
2018	Youth Olympic Games	Buenos Aires, Argentina	15th (sf)	50 m butterfly	24.90
2018	Youth Olympic Games	Buenos Aires, Argentina	18th (h)	100 m butterfly	54.52
2019	World Championships	Gwangju, South Korea	50th (h)	50 m butterfly	24.85
2019	World Championships	Gwangju, South Korea	47th (h)	100 m butterfly	54.94
2019	African Games	Casablanca, Morocco	10th (h)	50 m freestyle	23.57
2019	African Games	Casablanca, Morocco	7th	50 m butterfly	24.50
2019	African Games	Casablanca, Morocco	9th (h)	100 m butterfly	55.20
2021	Olympic Games	Tokyo, Japan	45th (h)	100 m butterfly	53.39
2021	African Championships	Accra, Ghana	2nd	50 m butterfly	24.18
2021	African Championships	Accra, Ghana	3rd	100 m butterfly	53.98
2022	World Championships	Budapest, Hungary	37th (h)	50 m butterfly	24.11
2022	World Championships	Budapest, Hungary	44th (h)	100 m butterfly	54.67
2022	Commonwealth Games	(United Kingdom) Smethwick, Great Britain	23rd (h)	50 m freestyle	23.62
2022	Commonwealth Games	(United Kingdom) Smethwick, Great Britain	17th (h)	50 m butterfly	24.19
2022	Commonwealth Games	12th (sf)	100 m butterfly	53.79	
2022	African Championships	Tunis, Tunisia	2nd	50 m butterfly	24.08
2022	African Championships	Tunis, Tunisia	1st	100 m butterfly	53.89
2023	World Championships	Fukuoka, Japan	48th (h)	50 m butterfly	24.14
2023	World Championships	Fukuoka, Japan	42nd (h)	100 m butterfly	53.73
2024	World Championships	Doha, Qatar	36th (h)	50 m butterfly	24.29
2024	World Championships	Doha, Qatar	38th (h)	100 m butterfly	54.28
2024	African Games	Accra, Ghana	10th (h)	50 m freestyle	23.59
2024	African Games	Accra, Ghana	2nd	50 m butterfly	24.23
2024	African Games	Accra, Ghana	3rd	100 m butterfly	53.80
2024	BRICS Games	Kazan, Russia	3rd	50 m butterfly	23.87
2024	BRICS Games	Kazan, Russia	3rd	100 m butterfly	53.08

==== Short course ====
Year	Competition	Venue	Position	Event	Notes
Representing Ghana
2014	World Championships	Doha, Qatar	100th (h)	50 m butterfly	26.78
2014	World Championships	Doha, Qatar	79th (h)	100 m butterfly	59.94
2016	World Championships	Windsor, Canada	-	50 m freestyle	DNS
2016	World Championships	Windsor, Canada	-	50 m butterfly	DNS
2022	World Championships	Melbourne, Australia	50th (h)	50 m butterfly	23.87
2022	World Championships	Melbourne, Australia	34th (h)	100 m butterfly	52.36

=== Relay ===
==== Long course ====
Year	Competition	Venue	Position	Event	Notes
Representing Ghana
2019	World Championships	Gwangju, South Korea	31st (h)	4 × 100 m mixed medley	4:21.40
2024	African Games	Accra, Ghana	7th	4 × 100 m freestyle	3:37.05
2024	African Games	Accra, Ghana	4th	4 × 100 m mixed freestyle	3:42:97
2024	African Games	Accra, Ghana	5th	4 × 100 m mixed medley	4:09.33
