= Ali Khalafalla =

Egyptian swimmer (born 1996)

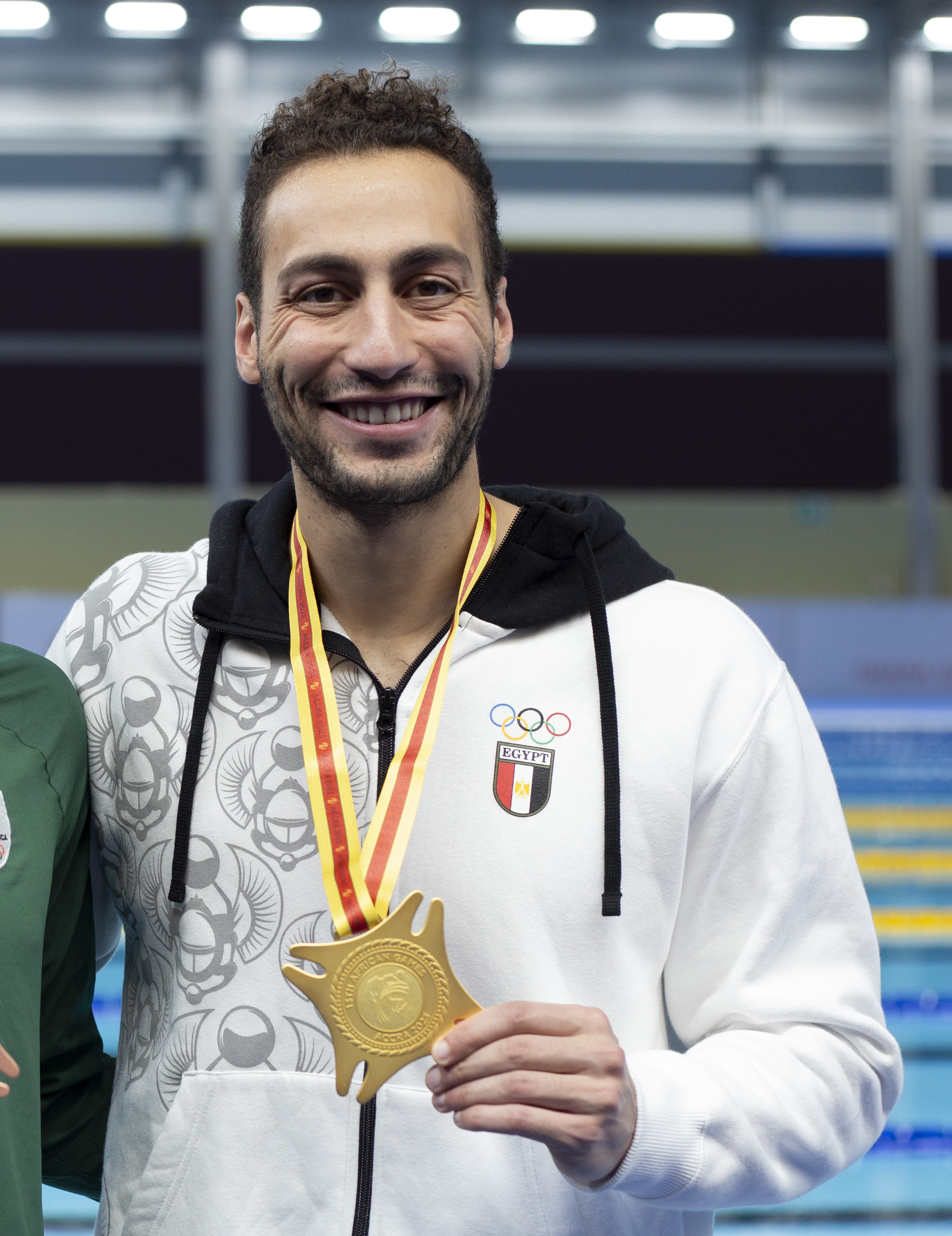
- 2023 African Games

Personal information
- Native name: على أحمد محمود على خلف الله
- Full name: Ali Ahmad Mahmoud Ali Khalafalla
- Nationality: Egyptian
- Born: 13 May 1996 (age 30) Cairo, Egypt
- Height: 1.82 m (6 ft 0 in)
- Weight: 82 kg (181 lb)

Sport
- Country: Egypt
- Sport: Swimming
- Strokes: Freestyle
- University team: Indiana University

Achievements and titles
- Personal bests: 50 m freestyle: 21.97 (2018); 50 m freestyle: 21.94 (2021)
Medal record
Men's swimming
Representing Egypt
Event	1st	2nd	3rd
African Games	1	6	0
African Championships	4	2	1
Mediterranean Games	0	0	1
Total	5	8	2
African Games
Gold medal – first place	2019 Casablanca	50 m freestyle
Silver medal – second place	2019 Casablanca	100 m freestyle
Silver medal – second place	2019 Casablanca	50 m butterfly
Silver medal – second place	2019 Casablanca	4×100 m freestyle
Silver medal – second place	2019 Casablanca	4×100 m medley
Silver medal – second place	2019 Casablanca	Mixed 4×100 m freestyle
Silver medal – second place	2019 Casablanca	Mixed 4×100 m medley
African Championships
Gold medal – first place	2018 Algiers	50 m freestyle
Gold medal – first place	2018 Algiers	4×100 m freestyle
Gold medal – first place	2018 Algiers	4×100 m medley
Gold medal – first place	2018 Algiers	Mixed 4×100 m freestyle
Gold medal – first place	2021 Accra	50 m freestyle
Silver medal – second place	2018 Algiers	100 m freestyle
Silver medal – second place	2018 Algiers	50 m butterfly
Silver medal – second place	2021 Accra	50 m butterfly
Bronze medal – third place	2018 Algiers	100 m backstroke
Mediterranean Games
Bronze medal – third place	2018 Tarragona	50 m freestyle

Ali Khalafalla (Arabic: على أحمد محمود على خلف الله; born 13 May 1996) is an Egyptian Olympic swimmer. He represented his country at the 2016 Summer Olympics and 2020 Summer Olympics. He placed 23rd in the 50 Freestyle, in Rio 2016. In Tokyo 2020, he placed 24th in the same event. A feat that has never been accomplished in Egypt's history.

After breaking the Egyptian record that stood strong for 22 years, he set a new Egyptian record in California in 2017 which paved the way to become the fastest Egyptian swimmer in Egypt's history with a time of 22.12. He further took Egypt's sprint swimming further after he clocked his personal best in Tarragona, Spain at the 2018 Mediterranean Games. Thus becoming the first and only Egyptian to break the 22 second barrier in the 50 freestyle with a time of 21.97 seconds. in 2021, the best time and Egyptian record in the 50 meters freestyle was lowered and currently stands at 21.94.

He attended Fork Union Military Academy in Fork Union, Virginia for three years before graduating. At FUMA, he led the team to a back-to-back VISAA State Swimming Championships titles in 2013 and 2014. He currently holds the Virginia state records in the 50 and 100 freestyle events.

Ali then attended Indiana University from 2015 to 2019 and played a role in the team's success to two Big Ten Championships Titles, and a third-place finish at the 2018 NCAA Swimming Championships. He graduated in 2019 with a Management in Public Affairs bachelor's degree.
