= Yusuf Tibazi =

Moroccan swimmer

Personal information
- Nationality: Moroccan
- Born: 13 March 1996 (age 30) Arleta, California, U.S.

Sport
- Sport: Swimming
- Strokes: butterfly
- College team: UC Santa Barbara Gauchos
Medal record
African Games
| Bronze medal – third place | 2019 Casablanca | 100 m butterfly |
| Bronze medal – third place | 2019 Casablanca | 4×100 m mixed medley relay |
African Championships
| Silver medal – second place | 2018 Algiers | 100 m butterfly |
| Bronze medal – third place | 2018 Algiers | 50 m butterfly |

Yusuf Tibazi (born March 13, 1996) is an American born Moroccan swimmer. He competed at the 2019 World Aquatics Championships. In 2016 Tibazi compete on the 2016 U.S. Olympic Trials, but didn't qualify the 2016 Summer Olympics. In 2018 Tibazi gave Moroccan nationality, and represent his country in 2018 African Swimming Championships where he won 2 medals.

== Major results ==
=== Individual ===
==== Long course ====
| Year | Competition | Venue | Position | Event | Notes |
Representing Morocco
| 2018 | African Championships | Algiers, Algeria | 6th | 50 m freestyle | 23.75 |
| 2018 | African Championships | Algiers, Algeria | 15th (h) | 50 m breaststroke | 31.30 |
| 2018 | African Championships | Algiers, Algeria | 3rd | 50 m butterfly | 24.11 |
| 2018 | African Championships | Algiers, Algeria | 2nd | 100 m butterfly | 54.20 |
| 2019 | World Championships | Gwangju, South Korea | 37th (h) | 50 m butterfly | 24.18 |
| 2019 | World Championships | Gwangju, South Korea | 40th (h) | 100 m butterfly | 54.21 |
| 2019 | African Games | Casablanca, Morocco | 5th | 50 m butterfly | 24.15 |
| 2019 | African Games | Casablanca, Morocco | 3rd | 100 m butterfly | 53.89 |

=== Relay ===
==== Long course ====
| Year | Competition | Venue | Position | Event | Notes |
Representing Morocco
| 2018 | African Championships | Algiers, Algeria | 5th | 4 × 100 m freestyle | 3:32.35 |
| 2018 | African Championships | Algiers, Algeria | 6th | 4 × 100 m mixed freestyle | 3:48.63 |
| 2019 | African Games | Casablanca, Morocco | 4th | 4 × 100 m medley | 3:48.82 |
| 2019 | African Games | Casablanca, Morocco | 3rd | 4 × 100 m mixed medley | 4:08.28 |
| 2022 | African Championships | Tunis, Tunisia | 6th | 4 × 100 m mixed medley | 4:18.49 |
