= 2016 African Swimming Championships =

12th African Swimming Championships
- Host city: Bloemfontein (South Africa)
- Date(s): 16–23 October 2016
- Venue(s): Stadium Swimming Pool Bloemfontein
- Nations participating: 17
- Events: 44

The 12th African Swimming Championships were held 16–23 October 2016 in Bloemfontein (South Africa).

Competition location was the Stadium Swimming Pool in Bloemfontein.

== Participating countries ==
Countries which sent teams were:

- Algeria
- Angola
- Benin
- Botswana
- Congo
- Egypt
- Mauritius
- Morocco
- Mozambique
- Namibia
- Nigeria
- Senegal
- Seychelles
- South Africa
- Sudan
- Zambia
- Zimbabwe

== Medal standings ==
Final medal standings for the 2016 African Swimming Championships are:

Rank	Nation	Gold	Silver	Bronze	Total
1	South Africa (RSA)	33	16	13	62
2	Algeria (ALG)	7	7	6	20
3	Egypt (EGY)	3	20	18	41
4	Seychelles (SEY)	1	1	2	4
5	Morocco (MAR)	0	0	3	3
6	Senegal (SEN)	0	0	1	1
Totals (6 entries)		44	44	43	131

== Results ==
=== Men ===
Games	Gold		Silver		Bronze	
50m Free	Oussama Sahnoune; Algeria	22.39	Douglas Erasmus; South Africa	22.55	Mohamed Samy; Egypt	23.08
100m Free	Oussama Sahnoune; Algeria	49.60 CR	Calvyn Justus; South Africa	50.21	Mohamed Samy; Egypt	50.29
200m Free	Myles Brown; South Africa	1:50.93	Marwan El-Amrawy; Egypt	1:51.60	Calvyn Justus; South Africa	1:51.92
400m Free	Myles Brown; South Africa	3:54.80	Marwan El-Amrawy; Egypt	3:56.45	Lounis Khendriche; Algeria	4:02.15
800m Free	Marwan El-Amrawy; Egypt	8:13.07	Brent Szurdoki; South Africa	8:14.75	Josh Dannhauser; South Africa	8:18.57
1500m Free	Brent Szurdoki; South Africa	15:37.65	Marwan El-Amrawy; Egypt	15:48.33	Josh Dannhauser; South Africa	16:00.17
50m Back	Mohamed Samy; Egypt	26.62	Jacques van Wyk; South Africa	27.12	Driss Lahrichi; Morocco	27.59
100m Back	Jacques van Wyk; South Africa	56.50	Mohamed Samy; Egypt	57.31	Neil de Villiers; South Africa	57.43
200m Back	Martin Binedell; South Africa	2:03.43	Neil Fair; South Africa	2:04.33	Ahmed Hamdy; Egypt	2:07.45
50m Breast	Cameron van der Burgh; South Africa	28.05 CR	Michael Houlie; South Africa	28.63	Ahmed Shamlool; Egypt	28.92
100m Breast	Alaric Basson; South Africa	1:03.12	Michael Houlie; South Africa	1:03.46	Hassan Yasser; Egypt	1:03.66
200m Breast	Ayrton Sweeney; South Africa	2:16.96	Alaric Basson; South Africa	2:20.82	Hassan Yasser; Egypt	2:21.17
50m Fly	Douglas Erasmus; South Africa	24.33	Hassan Yasser; Egypt	24.64	Alard Basson; South Africa	24.83
100m Fly	Chad le Clos; South Africa	52.69	Mohamed Samy; Egypt	54.91	Alard Basson; South Africa	55.05
200m Fly	Eben Vorster; South Africa	2:01.03	Ahmed Hamdy; Egypt	2:03.27	Lounis Khendriche; Algeria	2:03.48
200m IM	Jarryd Baxter; South Africa	2:04.68	Neil Fair; South Africa	2:05.37	Mohamed Samy; Egypt	2:08.22
400m IM	Ayrton Sweeney; South Africa	4:27.80	Ahmed Hamdy; Egypt	4:30.22	Neil Fair; South Africa	4:31.41
4x100m Free Relay	South Africa; Douglas Erasmus, Calvyn Justus, Eben Vorster, Myles Brown	3:22.76; CR	Egypt; Ihab Salem Salem, Marwan Elamrawy, Ahmed Hamdy, Mohamed Samy	3:25.52	Senegal; El Hadji Adama Diane, Adama Thiaw Ndir, Matar Samb, Abdul Khadre Mbaya Niane	3:59.50
4x200m Free Relay	South Africa; Josh Dannhauser, Brent Szurdoki, Calvyn Justus, Myles Brown	7:36.80	Egypt; Ihab Salem Salem, Mohamed Samy, Marwan Elamrawy, Ahmed Hamdy	7:38.89	Morocco; Said Saber, Driss Lahrichi, Nouamane Battahi, Adil Assouab	8:10.37
4x100m Medley Relay	South Africa; Jacques van Wyk, Alaric Basson, Alard Basson, Calvyn Justus	3:44.60	Egypt; Mohamed Samy, Hassan Yasser, Ahmed Hamdy, Ihab Salem Salem	3:51.91	Morocco; Driss Lahrichi, Ahmed Reda Ennaim, Nouamane Battahi, Adil Assouab	3:58.31

=== Women ===
Games	Gold		Silver		Bronze	
50m Free	Amel Melih; Algeria	26.72	Rowan El Badry; Egypt	27.02	Alexus Laird; Seychelles	27.03
100m Free	Amel Melih; Algeria	58.28	Gabi Grobler (South Africa) South AFrica	58.54	Samantha Labuschagne (South Africa) South AFrica	59.38
200m Free	Caitlin Kat; South Africa	2:06.07	Rebecca Meder; South Africa	2:06.16	Souad Nefissa Cherouati; Algeria	2:07.51
400m Free	Caitlin Kat; South Africa	4:24.74	Souad Nefissa Cherouati; Algeria	4:26.44	Jessica Whelan; South Africa	4:29.68
800m Free	Souad Nefissa Cherouati; Algeria	9:10.29	Reem Mohamed Hussein; Egypt	9:13.85	Michelle Weber; South Africa	9:15.89
1500m Free	Charlise Oberholzer; South Africa	17:20.44	Souad Nefissa Cherouati; Algeria	17:44.35	Michelle Weber; South Africa	17:55.43
50m Back	Alexus Laird; Seychelles	30.68	Amel Melih (Algeria) South Africa	31.08	Ingy Abouzaid; Egypt	31.72
100m Back	Mariella Venter; South Africa	1:02.44 CR	Alexus Laird; Seychelles	1:05.53	Ingy Abouzaid; Egypt	1:06.50
200m Back	Mariella Venter; South Africa	2:14.33	Nathania van Niekerk; South Africa	2:15.49	Alexus Laird; Seychelles	2:22.67
50m Breast	Kaylene Corbett; South Africa	32.58 CR	Hanim Abrahams; South Africa	33.08	Mai Atef Abdelfattah; Egypt	33.44
100m Breast	Kaylene Corbett; South Africa	1:11.81	Hanim Abrahams; South Africa	1:12.35	Mai Atef Abdelfattah; Egypt	1:12.49
200m Breast	Kaylene Corbett; South Africa	2:33.09	Hanim Abrahams; South Africa	2:36.57	Rowida Mohamed; Egypt	2:41.71
50m Fly	Nathania van Niekerk; South Africa	28.15	Lesley Blignaut; South Africa	29.23	Mariam Sakr; Egypt	29.42
100m Fly	Nathania van Niekerk; South Africa	1:02.61	Mariam Sakr; Egypt	1:03.11	Rowida Mohamed; Egypt	1:03.23
200m Fly	Sarah Hadj Abderrahmane; Algeria	2:15.75	Mariam Sakr; Egypt	2:18.88	Rowida Mohamed; Egypt	2:20.00
200m IM	Rebecca Meder; South Africa	2:20.37	Rania Hamida Nefsi; Algeria >	2:22.16	Rowida Mohamed; Egypt	2:22.38
400m IM	Rebecca Meder; South Africa	4:58.51	Rania Hamida Nefsi; Algeria	5:02.58	Rowida Mohamed; Egypt	5:05.51
4x100m Free Relay	Algeria; Sarah Hadj Abderrahmane, Souad Nefissa Cherouati, Rania Hamida Nefsi, Amel Melih	4:00.92	Egypt; Rowida Mohamed, Rowan El Badry, Mariam Sakr, Mai Atef Abdelfattah	4:06.62		
4x200m Free Relay	South Africa; Nathania van Niekerk, Caitlin Kat, Jessica Whelan, Rebecca Meder	8:39.00	Algeria; Sarah Hadj Abderrahmane, Rania Hamida Nefsi, Amel Melih, Souad Nefissa Cherouati	8:56.87	Egypt; Reem Mohamed Hussein, Ingy Abouzaid, Rowan El Badry, Mariam Sakr	9:06.63
4x100m Medley Relay	South Africa; Mariella Venter, Kaylene Corbett, Nathania van Niekerk, Gabi Grobler	4:18.92	Egypt; Ingy Abouzaid, Mai Atef Abdelfattah, Mariam Sakr, Rowan El Badry	4:21.71	Algeria; Amel Melih, Rania Hamida Nefsi, Sarah Hadj Abderrahmane, Souad Nefissa Cherouati	4:18.61

=== Mixed ===
Games	Gold		Silver		Bronze	
4x100m Free Relay	South Africa; Calvyn Justus, Gabi Grobler, Samantha Labuschagne, Myles Brown	3:37.02; CR	Egypt; Rowan El Badry, Ihab Salem Salem, Mohamed Samy, Mai Atef Abdelfattah	3:43.01	Algeria; Oussama Sahnoune, Lounis Khendriche, Amel Melih, Souad Nefissa Cherouati	3:43.32
4x100m Medley Relay	South Africa; Mariella Venter, Alaric Basson, Alard Basson, Gabi Grobler	3:59.28; CR	Egypt; Mohamed Samy, Hassan Yasser, Mariam Sakr, Rowan El Badry	4:06.12	Algeria; Amel Melih, Ramzi Chouchar, Sarah Hadj Abderrahmane, Oussama Sahnoune	4:18.61

=== Open water race ===
Games	Gold		Silver		Bronze	
5 k (men)	Youssef Hossam; Egypt	1:00:09.36	Marwan Elamrawy; Egypt	1:00:20.34	Danie Marais; South Africa	1:00:22.11
5 k (women)	Michelle Weber; South Africa	1:12:13.26	Souad Nefissa Cherouati; Algeria	1:12:13.62	Carmen le Roux; South Africa	1:12:16.37
