= Abdoul Niane =

Senegalese swimmer

Personal information
- Full name: Abdoul Khadre Mbaye Niane
- Born: 20 August 1988 (age 37)

Sport
- Sport: Swimming

Abdoul Khadre Mbaye Niane (born 20 August 1988) is a Senegalese swimmer. He competed in the men's 50 metre freestyle event at the 2016 Summer Olympics.

== Major results ==
=== Individual ===
==== Long course ====
Year	Competition	Venue	Position	Event	Notes
Representing Senegal
2008	African Championships	Johannesburg, South Africa	6th	100 m freestyle	55.28
2008	African Championships	Johannesburg, South Africa	7th	200 m freestyle	2:08.07
2016	Olympic Games	Rio de Janeiro, Brazil	48th (h)	50 m freestyle	23.66
2016	African Championships	Bloemfontein, South Africa	4th	50 m freestyle	23.44
2016	African Championships	Bloemfontein, South Africa	7th	100 m freestyle	52.70
2016	African Championships	Bloemfontein, South Africa	9th (h)	200 m freestyle	2:02.03
2016	African Championships	Bloemfontein, South Africa	4th	50 m breaststroke	29.55

=== Relay ===
==== Long course ====
Year	Competition	Venue	Position	Event	Notes
Representing Senegal
2008	African Championships	Johannesburg, South Africa	3rd	4 x 100 m freestyle	3:42.24
2016	African Championships	Bloemfontein, South Africa	3rd	4 x 100 m freestyle	3:39.50
2016	African Championships	Bloemfontein, South Africa	4th	4 x 200 m freestyle	8:26.43
2016	African Championships	Bloemfontein, South Africa	4th	4 x 100 m medley	4:08.56
