= Mario Ervedosa =

Angolan swimmer

Personal information
- Born: 28 May 1998 (age 28)

Sport
- Sport: Swimming

Mario Ervedosa (born 28 May 1998) is an Angolan swimmer. He competed in the men's 50 metre breaststroke event at the 2017 World Aquatics Championships.
