= Abdelrahman Sameh =

Egyptian swimmer (born 2000)

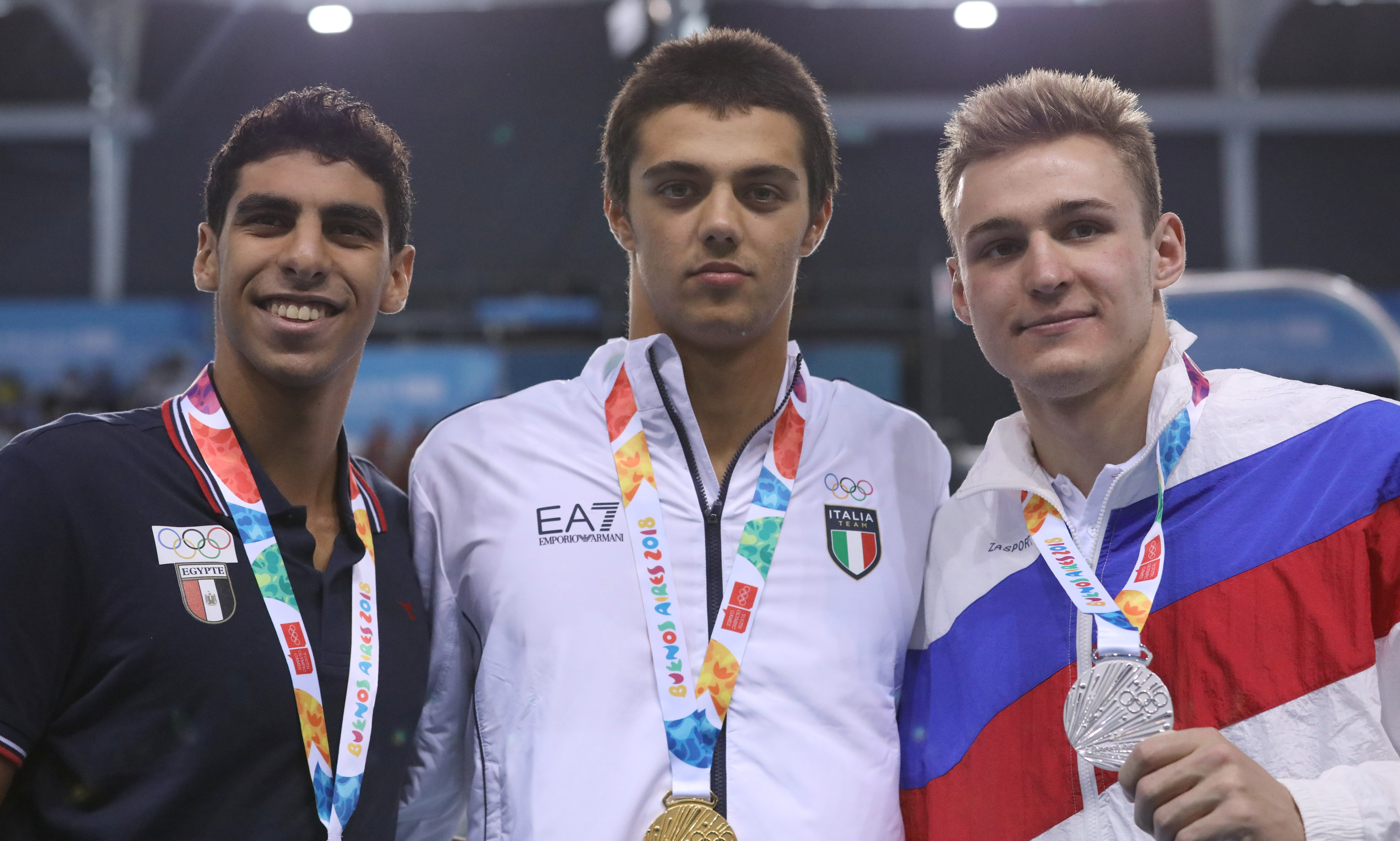
- Abdelrahman Sameh in 2018 (left)

Personal information
- Full name: Abdelrahman Sameh Mahmoud Kamel Elsayed Mohamed Elaraby
- Nationality: Egyptian
- Born: 9 March 2000 (age 26)
- Height: 1.90 m (6 ft 3 in)
- Weight: 75 kg (165 lb)

Sport
- Sport: Swimming
- College team: Notre Dame (2023–2024); Louisville (2018–2023)
Medal record
Men's swimming
Representing Egypt
Summer Youth Olympics
Bronze medal – third place	2018 Buenos Aires	50 m freestyle
Mediterranean Games
Gold medal – first place	2026 Taranto	50 m butterfly

Abdelrahman Sameh Mahmoud Kamel Elsayed Mohamed Elaraby (Arabic: عبد الرحمن سامح, born 9 March 2000) is an Egyptian swimmer. He won the bronze medal at the 2018 Youth Olympic Games in the 50 metre freestyle. He made the final in the men's 50 metre butterfly at the 2023 World Aquatics Championships, finishing 8th. At the second stop of the 2023 swimming world cup series in Athens, Sameh won gold in the 50 metre butterfly and competed in the men's 50 metre butterfly at the 2019 World Aquatics Championships.

After his gold medal on October 15, 2023, he said "Honestly, I don't know if I should be celebrating this or not. My brothers and sisters are being killed in Palestine right now." He also reported being the subject of death threats for his support of Palestine.
