= Bradley Vincent =

South African-Mauritian swimmer

Personal information
- Full name: Bradley Ronald Vincent
- Nationality: South African-Mauritian
- Born: 30 November 1991 (age 34) Cape Town, South Africa
- Height: 195 cm (6 ft 5 in)
- Weight: 89 kg (196 lb)
Medal record
Men's swimming
Representing Mauritius
African Championships
| Silver medal – second place | 2018 Algiers | 50 m freestyle |
| Bronze medal – third place | 2018 Algiers | 100 m freestyle |

Bradley Ronald Vincent (born 30 November 1991) is a South African-Mauritian competitive swimmer. He competed at the 2016 Summer Olympics in Rio de Janeiro, in the men's 100 metre freestyle. He starts at the Swimming World Cup 2017 and broke his own record (22,82) about 50m Freestyle.

In October 2022, he was handed a 3-year ban by the Mauritian Olympic Committee for gross misconduct during the Commonwealth Games 2022 in Birmingham.
