= Chase Onorati =

Zimbabwean swimmer (born 1999)

Personal information
- Nationality: Zimbabwean
- Born: 20 August 1999 (age 26)

Sport
- Sport: Swimming

Chase Onorati (born 20 August 1999) is a Zimbabwean swimmer. He competed in the men's 100 metre butterfly event at the 2018 FINA World Swimming Championships (25 m), in Hangzhou, China.
