= Souhail Hamouchane =

Moroccan swimmer (born 1997)

Personal information
- Born: 26 November 1997 (age 28)

Sport
- Sport: Swimming
Medal record
Representing Morocco
African Games
Bronze medal – third place	2019 Rabat	4x100m freestyle relay

Souhail Hamouchane (born 26 November 1997) is a Moroccan swimmer. He competed in the men's 100 metre freestyle event at the 2017 World Aquatics Championships. In 2019, he represented Morocco at the 2019 African Games held in Rabat, Morocco.
