= Alaric Basson =

South African swimmer (born 1996)

Personal information
- Full name: Alaric Bennedict Basson
- Nationality: South African
- Born: 16 February 1996 (age 30) Uitenhage, South Africa

Sport
- Sport: Swimming
- Strokes: Breaststroke, freestyle
Medal record
Men's swimming
Representing South Africa
Event	1st	2nd	3rd
African Games	0	1	0
African Championships	3	5	3
Total	3	6	3
African Games
Silver medal – second place	2015 Brazzaville	4×100 m mixed medley
African Championships
Gold medal – first place	2016 Bloemfontein	100 m breaststroke
Gold medal – first place	2016 Bloemfontein	4×100 m medley
Gold medal – first place	2016 Bloemfontein	4×100 m mixed medley
Silver medal – second place	2016 Bloemfontein	200 m breaststroke
Silver medal – second place	2018 Algiers	100 m breaststroke
Silver medal – second place	2018 Algiers	4×100 m freestyle
Silver medal – second place	2018 Algiers	4×100 m medley
Silver medal – second place	2018 Algiers	4×100 m mixed freestyle
Bronze medal – third place	2018 Algiers	50 m breaststroke
Bronze medal – third place	2018 Algiers	200 m breaststroke
Bronze medal – third place	2018 Algiers	4×200 m freestyle

Alaric Bennedict Basson (born 16 February 1996) is a South African swimmer. He competed in the men's 200 metre breaststroke at the 2019 World Aquatics Championships. His twin brother Alard is also a swimmer.
