= Samy Boutouil =

Moroccan swimmer (born 2000)

Personal information
- Nationality: Moroccan
- Born: 3 October 2000 (age 25)

Sport
- Sport: Swimming
Medal record
Men's swimming
Representing Morocco
African Games
Bronze medal – third place	2019 Rabat	4×100 m freestyle
Bronze medal – third place	2019 Rabat	4×100 m mixed medley

Samy Boutouil (born 3 October 2000) is a Moroccan swimmer. He competed in the men's 100 metre freestyle at the 2020 Summer Olympics. He won two bronze medals at the 2019 African Games.
