= Algeria at the 2025 World Aquatics Championships =

- Flag of Algeria
- World Aquatics code: ALG
- National federation: Algerian Swimming Federation
- Website: www.fanatation.dz

in Singapore
- Competitors: 3 in 1 sport
- Medals: Gold 0 Silver 0 Bronze 0 Total 0

World Aquatics Championships appearances
- 1973; 1975; 1978; 1982; 1986; 1991; 1994; 1998; 2001; 2003; 2005; 2007; 2009; 2011; 2013; 2015; 2017; 2019; 2022; 2023; 2024; 2025

Algeria is competing at the 2025 World Aquatics Championships in Singapore from 11 July to 3 August 2025.

== Competitors ==
The following is the list of competitors in the Championships.

Sport	Men	Women	Total
Swimming	2	1	3
Total	2	1	3

== Swimming ==
Men

Athlete	Event	Heat		Semifinal		Final	
Athlete	Event	Time	Rank	Time	Rank	Time	Rank
Oussama Sahnoune	50 m freestyle	DNS					
Jaouad Syoud	200 m breaststroke	DNS					
Jaouad Syoud	200 m medley	2:00.99	24	Did not advance			
Jaouad Syoud	400 m medley	DNS					

Women

Athlete	Event	Heat		Semifinal		Final	
Athlete	Event	Time	Rank	Time	Rank	Time	Rank
Amel Melih	50 m freestyle	25.70	35	Did not advance			
Amel Melih	50 m backstroke	29.47	38	Did not advance			
Amel Melih	50 m butterfly	27.64	43	Did not advance			
