= List of Algerian records in swimming =

The Algerian Records in swimming are the fastest times ever swum by a swimmer representing Algeria. These records are kept/maintained by the Algeria's national swimming federation: Fédération Algerienne de Natation (FAN).

Records are recognized for males and females in the following long course (50m) and short course (25m) events:

- freestyle: 50, 100, 200, 400, 800 and 1500;
- backstroke: 50, 100 and 200;
- breaststroke: 50, 100 and 200;
- butterfly: 50, 100 and 200;
- individual medley (I.M.): 100 (25m only), 200 and 400;
- relays: 4x100 free, 4x200 free, and 4 × 100 medley.

All records were set in finals unless noted otherwise.

== Long course (50m) ==
=== Men ===
Event	Time		Name	Club	Date	Meet	Location	Ref
50 m freestyle	21.82		Oussama Sahnoune	Algeria	14 July 2018	Arab Championships	Rades, Tunisia	
100 m freestyle	48.00		Oussama Sahnoune	Algeria	24 June 2018	Mediterranean Games	Tarragona, Spain	
200 m freestyle	1:50.02		Oussama Sahnoune	GS Pétroliers	25 July 2013	Algerian Championships	Algiers, Algeria	
400 m freestyle	3:56.02		Mohamed Djaballah	Algeria	23 August 2019	African Games	Casablanca, Morocco	
800 m freestyle	8:08.88		Mohamed Djaballah	Algeria	21 August 2019	African Games	Casablanca, Morocco	
1500 m freestyle	15:48.50		Mohamed Djaballah	Algeria	24 August 2019	African Games	Casablanca, Morocco	
50 m backstroke	25.61		Abdellah Ardjoune	Algeria	23 August 2019	African Games	Casablanca, Morocco	
100 m backstroke	55.02		Abdellah Ardjoune	Algeria	24 August 2019	African Games	Casablanca, Morocco	
200 m backstroke	2:00.38		Abdellah Ardjoune	Algeria	21 August 2019	African Games	Casablanca, Morocco	
50 m breaststroke	27.85		Jaouad Syoud	Algeria	9 July 2023	Pan Arab Games	Oran, Algeria	
100 m breaststroke	1:01.18		Jaouad Syoud	Algeria	21 August 2022	African Championships	Tunis, Tunisia	
200 m breaststroke	2:13.35		Jaouad Syoud	Algeria	23 July 2022	Arab Championships	Oran, Algeria	
50 m butterfly	24.02	h	Jaouad Syoud	Olympic Nice Natation	5 April 2022	French Championships	Limoges, France	
100 m butterfly	52.08		Jaouad Syoud	Olympic Nice Natation	17 July 2021	French Summer Championships	Dunkirk, France	
200 m butterfly	1:57.88		Jaouad Syoud	Olympic Nice Natation	7 April 2022	French Championships	Limoges, France	
200 m individual medley	1:58.12	h	Jaouad Syoud	Olympic Nice Natation	8 April 2022	French Championships	Limoges, France	
400 m individual medley	4:19.02		Jaouad Syoud	Olympic Nice Natation	15 June 2021	French Championships	Chartres, France	
4 × 100 m freestyle relay	3:20.87		Jaouad Syoud (50.20); Fares Benzidoune (51.61); Oussama Sahnoune (48.27); Mehdi Benbara (50.79)	Algeria	23 July 2022	Arab Championships	Oran, Algeria	
4×200 m freestyle relay	7:32.50		Ryad Djendouci; Mehdi Hamama; Badis Djendouci; Nabil Kebbab	Algeria	13 July 2007	African Games	Algiers, Algeria	
4×100 m medley relay	3:39.22		Abdellah Ardjoune (55.39); Aimene Balamane (1:02.04); Jaouad Syoud (52.16); Oussama Sahnoune (49.63)	Algeria	21 July 2022	Arab Championships	Oran, Algeria	

Legend: # – Record awaiting ratification by Fédération Algerienne de Natacion; e – equalled existing record;
Records not set in finals: h – heat; sf – semifinal; r – relay 1st leg; rh – relay heat 1st leg; b – B final; † – en route to final mark; so – swim-off; tt – time trial

=== Women ===
Event	Time		Name	Club	Date	Meet	Location	Ref
50 m freestyle	25.36		Amel Melih	Algeria	1 June 2021	Mare Nostrum	Canet-en-Roussillon, France	
100 m freestyle	55.87		Amel Melih	Algeria	6 July 2023	Pan Arab Games	Oran, Algeria	
200 m freestyle	2:02.63		Majda Chebaraka	Algeria	7 September 2015	African Games	Brazzaville, Congo	
400 m freestyle	4:19.24		Majda Chebaraka	Algeria	8 September 2015	African Games	Brazzaville, Congo	
800 m freestyle	8:57.34		Souad Cherouati	Algeria	28 April 2017	Golden Tour	Amiens, France	
1500 m freestyle	17:01.12		Souad Cherouati	Algeria	6 April 2017	Swim Cup	Eindhoven, Netherlands	
50 m backstroke	29.03		Amel Melih	Chabab Riadhi Belouizdad	2 August 2026	Algerian Championships	Oran, Algeria	
100 m backstroke	1:03.02	h	Amel Melih	Algeria	7 April 2016	Arab Championships	Dubai, United Arab Emirates	
200 m backstroke	2:19.67		Djihene Benchadli	Chabab Riadhi Belouizdad	1 August 2026	Algerian Championships	Oran, Algeria	
50 m breaststroke	32.58		Hannah Taleb	Algeria	6 April 2016	Arab Championships	Dubai, United Arab Emirates	
100 m breaststroke	1:11.70		Hannah Taleb	Algeria	5 April 2016	Arab Championships	Dubai, United Arab Emirates	
200 m breaststroke	2:33.33	=	Hamida Rania Nefsi	Algeria	10 July 2023	Pan Arab Games	Oran, Algeria	
200 m breaststroke	2:33.33	=	Hamida Rania Nefsi	Algeria	11 March 2024	African Games	Accra, Ghana	
50m butterfly	27.14		Amel Melih	Algeria	1 May 2024	African Championships	Luanda, Angola	
100m butterfly	1:01.22	h, =	Fella Bennaceur	Algeria	26 July 2009	World Championships	Rome, Italy	
100m butterfly	1:01.22	=	Nesrine Medjahed	Algeria	9 July 2023	Pan Arab Games	Oran, Algeria	
200m butterfly	2:14.78		Sarah Hadi	Algeria	4 April 2016	Arab Championships	Dubai, United Arab Emirates	
200m individual medley	2:19.83		Hamida Rania Nefsi	Algeria	5 April 2016	Arab Championships	Dubai, United Arab Emirates	
400m individual medley	4:52.13		Rania Hamida Nefsi	Regina Optimist Dolphin Swim Club	19 February 2019	Speedo Eastern Canadian Open	Montreal, Canada	
4 × 100 m freestyle relay	3:51.80		Nesrine Medjahed (57.46); Ryma Benmansour (57.59); Maha Djouahra (58.73); Lilia Sihem Midouni (58.02)	Algeria	8 May 2026	African Championships	Oran, Algeria	
4 × 200 m freestyle relay	8:33.30		Amel Melih; Rania Nefsi; Majda Chebaraka; Nesrine Medjahed	Algeria	10 September 2018	African Championships	Algiers, Algeria	
4 × 100 m medley relay	4:18.96		Meroua Merniz (1:04.15); Lina Mahi (1:15.17); Lilia Sihem Midouni (1:02.71); Nesrine Medjahed (56.93)	Algeria	9 May 2026	African Championships	Oran, Algeria	

Legend: # – Record awaiting ratification by Fédération Algerienne de Natacion; WR – World record; AF – African record; e – equalled existing record;
Records not set in finals: h – heat; sf – semifinal; r – relay 1st leg; rh – relay heat 1st leg; b – B final; † – en route to final mark; so – swim-off; tt – time trial

=== Mixed relay ===
Event	Time	Name	Club	Date	Meet	Location	Ref
4 × 100 m freestyle relay	3:35.50	Mehdi Benfekih (50.59); Fares Benzidoun (51.82); Ryma Benmansour (57.22); Amel Melih (55.87)	Chabab Riadhi Belouizdad	1 August 2026	Algerian Championships	Oran, Algeria	
4 × 100 m medley relay	3:57.72	Abdellah Ardjoune (55.72); Hamida Rania Nefsi (1:12.28); Jaouad Syoud (52.40); Nesrine Medjahed (57.32)	Algeria	22 July 2022	Arab Championships	Oran, Algeria	

Legend: # – Record awaiting ratification by Fédération Algerienne de Natacion; WR – World record; AF – African record; e – equalled existing record;
Records not set in finals: h – heat; so – swim-off

== Short course (25m) ==
=== Men ===
Event	Time		Name	Club	Date	Meet	Location	Ref
50m freestyle	21.26		Oussama Sahnoune	CN Marseille	1 December 2017	French Championships	Montpellier, France	
100m freestyle	46.42		Oussama Sahnoune	CN Marseille	3 December 2017	French Championships	Montpellier, France	
200m freestyle	1:46.97	b	Fares Benzidoun	Villejuif Natation	31 October 2026	French Championships	Angers, France	
400m freestyle	3:48.17		Mohamed Semmar	CR belouizdad	30 December 2025	Algerian Winter Championships	Oran, Algeria	
800m freestyle	7:59.53		Mehdi Dahamna	MC Alger	31 December 2025	Algerian Winter Championships	Oran, Algeria	
1500m freestyle	15:18.15		Lounis Khendriche	USMA	31 January 2019	Algerian Championships	Algiers, Algeria	
50m backstroke	24.80		Mehdi Benbara	CR belouizdad	30 December 2025	Algerian Winter Championships	Oran, Algeria	
100m backstroke	53.34		Abdellah Ardjoune	MC Alger	1 January 2026	Algerian Winter Championships	Oran, Algeria	
200m backstroke	1:56.89		Abdellah Ardjoune	Stipendium Hungaricum	7 November 2026	Hungarian Championships	Kaposvár, Hungary	
50m breaststroke	27.70		Nabil Kebbab	Algeria	31 March 2011	Algerian Championships	Algiers, Algeria	
100m breaststroke	59.83		Jaouad Syoud	Olympic Nice Natation	20 November 2022	Interclubs Toutes Catégories - Région Sud - Poule A	Monaco, Monaco	
200m breaststroke	2:09.44	h	Jaouad Syoud	Olympic Nice Natation	4 November 2022	French Championships	Chartres, France	
50m butterfly	23.66	h	Oussama Sahnoune	CN Marseille	2 December 2017	French Championships	Montpellier, France	
100m butterfly	51.26		Oussama Sahnoune	CN Marseille	30 November 2017	French Championships	Montpellier, France	
200m butterfly	1:55.69		Jaouad Syoud	Algeria	26 October 2021	Arab Championships	Abu Dhabi, United Arab Emirates	
100m individual medley	53.96	h	Jaouad Syoud	Algeria	12 December 2024	World Championships	Budapest, Hungary	
200m individual medley	1:56.36	h	Jaouad Syoud	Algeria	10 December 2024	World Championships	Budapest, Hungary	
400m individual medley	4:11.71	h	Jaouad Syoud	Algeria	14 December 2024	World Championships	Budapest, Hungary	
4 × 100 m freestyle relay	3:16.10	h	Salim Iles (48.54); Nabil Kebbab (46.63); Badis Djendouci (50.50); Mehdi Hamama (50.43)	Algeria	9 April 2008	World Championships	Manchester, Great Britain	
4 × 200 m freestyle relay	7:17.88	h	Nabil Kebbab (1:48.74); Badis Djendouci (1:49.54); Aghiles Slimani (1:49.81); Mehdi Hamama (1:49.79)	Algeria	10 April 2008	World Championships	Manchester, Great Britain	
4 × 100 m medley relay	3:39.29		Moncef Benbara (55.08); Ramzi Chouchar (1:02.34); Fares Benzidoun (52.97); Mehdi Benfekih (48.90)	CR belouizdad	2 January 2026	Algerian Winter Championships	Oran, Algeria	

Legend: # – Record awaiting ratification by Fédération Algerienne de Natacion; e – equalled existing record;
Records not set in finals: h – heat; sf – semifinal; r – relay 1st leg; rh – relay heat 1st leg; b – B final; † – en route to final mark; so – swim-off; tt – time trial

=== Women ===
Event	Time		Name	Club	Date	Meet	Location	Ref
50m freestyle	25.09	h, =	Amel Melih	Algeria	16 December 2022	World Championships	Melbourne, Australia	
50m freestyle	25.09	h, =	Amel Melih	Algeria	14 December 2024	World Championships	Budapest, Hungary	
100m freestyle	54.99	c	Amel Melih	Villeurbanne Natation	29 October 2026	French Championships	Angers, France	
200m freestyle	2:02.52	r, =	Majda Chebaraka	Stade Française o Courbevoie	8 November 2015	Regional Club Championships	Paris, France	
200m freestyle	2:02.52	r, =	Ryma Benmansour	CR belouizdad	29 December 2025	Algerian Winter Championships	Oran, Algeria	
400m freestyle	4:12.16		Souad Cherouati	GS Pétroliers	17 February 2017	Championnat Open d'hiver	Algiers, Algeria	
800m freestyle	8:44.01		Souad Cherouati	Algeria	2 November 2018	Grand Prix Zrenjanin	Zrenjanin, Serbia	
1500m freestyle	16:44.53		Souad Cherouati	Algeria	10 December 2017	International Austrian Championships	Graz, Austria	
50m backstroke	28.36	b	Amel Melih	Villeurbanne Natation	29 October 2026	French Championships	Angers, France	
100m backstroke	1:01.95	rh	Amel Melih	Algeria	11 December 2016	World Championships	Windsor, Canada	
100m backstroke	1:01.79	'#'	Meroua Merniz	CR belouizdad	23 February 2025	Algerian Championships	Algiers, Algeria	
200m backstroke	2:14.45		Meroua Merniz	CR belouizdad	29 December 2025	Algerian Winter Championships	Oran, Algeria	
50m breaststroke	32.38	h	Amira Kouza	ASSN Alger	3 December 2014	World Championships	Doha, Qatar	
100m breaststroke	1:09.62		Hannah Taleb Bendiab	Algeria	19 December 2015	ASA Winter Meet	Sheffield, Great Britain	
200m breaststroke	2:28.60	h	Rania Hamida Nefsi	Neptune Natation	23 November 2023	Coupe du Quebec Senior	Montreal, Canada	
50m butterfly	27.17		Lilia Sihem Midouni	Stipendium Hungaricum	6 November 2026	Hungarian Championships	Kaposvár, Hungary	
100m butterfly	1:01.20	h	Fella Bennaceur	Stade Française o Courbevoie	4 December 2009	France 25m Championships	Chartres, France	
200m butterfly	2:13.60		Fella Bennaceur	?	13 November 2010	?	Paris, France	
100m individual medley	1:02.94		Nesrine Medjahed	MC Alger	31 December 2025	Algerian Winter Championships	Oran, Algeria	
200m individual medley	2:17.13		Rania Hamida Nefsi	Algeria	1 November 2019	Festival par equipe section 1	Quebec, Canada	
400m individual medley	4:46.36		Rania Hamida Nefsi	Gsp	23 January 2020	Algerian Championships	Bab Ezzouar, Algeria	
4 × 100 m freestyle relay	3:52.41		Samara Abdellaoui (58.45); Meroua Merniz (59.18); Djihene Benchadli (59.20); Ryma Benmansour (55.58)	CR belouizdad	1 January 2026	Algerian Winter Championships	Oran, Algeria	
4 × 200 m freestyle relay	8:33.90		Ryma Benmansour (2:05.31); Ines Hadji-Kouidri (2:13.26); Meroua Merniz (2:07.23); Samara Abdellaoui (2:08.10)	CR belouizdad	30 December 2025	Algerian Winter Championships	Oran, Algeria	
4 × 100 m medley relay	4:17.25		Imène Zitouni; Melissa Touami; Lilia Sihem Midouni; Nesrine Medjahed	MC Alger	2 January 2026	Algerian Winter Championships	Oran, Algeria	

Legend: # – Record awaiting ratification by Fédération Algerienne de Natacion; e – equalled existing record;
Records not set in finals: h – heat; sf – semifinal; r – relay 1st leg; rh – relay heat 1st leg; b – B final; † – en route to final mark; so – swim-off; tt – time trial

=== Mixed relay ===
Event	Time		Name	Club	Date	Meet	Location	Ref
4×50 m freestyle relay	1:36.27		Mehdi Benbara (22.48); Mehdi Benfekih (21.81); Meroua Merniz (26.43); Ryma Benmansour (25.55)	CR belouizdad	31 December 2025	Algerian Winter Championships	Oran, Algeria	
4×50 m medley relay	1:47.56	h	Ryad Djendouci (25.32); Amira Raja Kouza (32.12); Jugurtha Boumali (24.05); Souad Nafissa Charouati (26.07)	Algeria	4 December 2014	World Championships	Doha, Qatar	

Legend: # – Record awaiting ratification by Fédération Algerienne de Natacion; e – equalled existing record;
Records not set in finals: h – heat; so – swim-off
