= List of Sudanese records in swimming =

The Sudanese records in swimming are the fastest ever performances of swimmers from Sudan, which are recognised and ratified by the Sudan Amateur Swimming Association.

All records were set in finals unless noted otherwise.

== Long Course (50 m) ==
=== Men ===
Event	Time		Name	Club	Date	Meet	Location	Ref
50 m freestyle	24.60	h	Ziyad Saleem	Schroeder YMCA	1 May 2021	TYR 18&U Spring Cup	Des Moines, United States	
100 m freestyle	53.33	tt	Ziyad Saleem	Schroeder YMCA	19 November 2020	WI WEST November Time Trial	Brown Deer, United States	
200 m freestyle	2:02.03		Adam Ahmed	Hadak Al Ahram	12 December 2024	Egyptian Championships	Cairo, Egypt	
400 m freestyle	4:22.65		Adam Ahmed	Hadak Al Ahram	25 April 2024	Egyptian Cup	Alexandria, Egypt	
800 m freestyle	8:52.06		Adam Ahmed	Hadak Al Ahram	8 December 2024	Egyptian Championships	Cairo, Egypt	
1500 m freestyle	17:04.28		Adam Ahmed	Hadak Al Ahram	13 December 2024	Egyptian Championships	Cairo, Egypt	
50 m backstroke	26.14	r	Ziyad Saleem	Schroeder YMCA Swim Team	29 July 2021	Wisconsin 13&O Championships	Pleasant Prairie, United States	
100 m backstroke	55.19		Ziyad Saleem	Schroeder YMCA Swim Team	21 June 2024	WI LAKE Western Great Lakes Open	Brown Deer, United States	
200 m backstroke	2:00.23		Ziyad Saleem	University of California-Berkeley	3 February 2024	Triton Invitational	San Diego, United States	
50 m breaststroke	28.92	h	Abobakr Abbas	Sudan	3 May 2024	African Championships	Luanda, Angola	
100 m breaststroke	1:04.24		Abobakr Abbas	Sudan	20 July 2022	Arab Championships	Oran, Algeria	
200 m breaststroke	2:19.57		Abobakr Abbas	Sudan	14 October 2021	African Championships	Accra, Ghana	
50 m butterfly	26.30	†	Ziyad Saleem	Schroeder YMCA Swim Team	29 April 2021	TYR 18&U Spring Cup	Des Moines, United States	
100 m butterfly	56.51	b	Ziyad Saleem	Schroeder YMCA Swim Team	29 April 2021	TYR 18&U Spring Cup	Des Moines, United States	
200 m butterfly	2:50.64	h	Mohamed B. Ahmed Ibrahim	Sudan	10 September 2015	African Games	Brazzaville, Congo	
200 m individual medley	2:20.52		Rami Elias					
400 m individual medley								
4×100 m freestyle relay	4:27.44		Ahmed I. Izzeldin Salih (1:04.40); [[]]; [[]]; [[]]	Sudan	9 September 2015	African Games	Brazzaville, Congo	
4×200 m freestyle relay								
4×100 m medley relay								

Legend: # – Record awaiting ratification by Sudan Amateur Swimming Association; WR – World record; AF – African record; e – equalled existing record;
Records not set in finals: h – heat; sf – semifinal; r – relay 1st leg; rh – relay heat 1st leg; b – B final; † – en route to final mark; so – swim-off; tt – time trial

=== Women ===
Event	Time		Name	Club	Date	Meet	Location	Ref
50 m freestyle	31.83	h	Leena Mohamedahmed	Sudan	17 February 2024	World Championships	Doha, Qatar	
100 m freestyle	1:04.75		Rana Saadeldin	AL Wasl Club	16 November 2024	Etihad Cup	Abu Dhabi, United Arab Emirates	
200 m freestyle	2:21.27		Rana Saadeldin	-	27 June 2026	Open Championships	Abu Dhabi, United Arab Emirates	
400 m freestyle								
800 m freestyle								
1500 m freestyle								
50 m backstroke	36.32	h	Rana Saadeldin	Sudan	26 July 2023	World Championships	Fukuoka, Japan	
50 m backstroke	35.55	'#'	Rana Saadeldin	AL Wasl Club	16 November 2024	Etihad Cup	Abu Dhabi, United Arab Emirates	
100 m backstroke								
200 m backstroke								
50 m breaststroke								
100 m breaststroke								
200 m breaststroke								
50 m butterfly	31.33		Rana Saadeldin	AL Wasl Club	16 November 2024	Etihad Cup	Abu Dhabi, United Arab Emirates	
100 m butterfly								
200 m butterfly								
200 m individual medley								
400 m individual medley								
4×100 m freestyle relay								
4×200 m freestyle relay								
4×100 m medley relay								

Legend: # – Record awaiting ratification by Sudan Amateur Swimming Association; WR – World record; AF – African record; e – equalled existing record;
Records not set in finals: h – heat; sf – semifinal; r – relay 1st leg; rh – relay heat 1st leg; b – B final; † – en route to final mark; so – swim-off; tt – time trial

== Short Course (25 m) ==
=== Men ===
Event	Time		Name	Club	Date	Meet	Location	Ref
50 m freestyle	23.95	h	Abobakr Abass	Stipendium Hungaricum	5 November 2026	Hungarian Championships	Kaposvár, Hungary	
100 m freestyle	55.40	h	Yousif Ibrahim	Sudan	11 December 2024	World Championships	Budapest, Hungary	
200 m freestyle	2:06.14	h	Yousif Ibrahim	Stipendium Hungaricum	7 November 2025	Hungarian Championships	Debrecen, Hungary	
400 m freestyle	5:03.19		Badreldin Mohamed	Sudan	19 October 2017	CANA Zone III Championships	Dar es Salaam, Tanzania	
800 m freestyle	11:01.28		Badreldin Mohamed	Sudan	18 October 2017	CANA Zone III Championships	Dar es Salaam, Tanzania	
1500 m freestyle								
50 m backstroke	25.30		Ziyad Saleem	Sudan	24 October 2021	Arab Championships	Abu Dhabi, United Arab Emirates	
100 m backstroke	53.90		Ziyad Saleem	Sudan	26 October 2021	Arab Championships	Abu Dhabi, United Arab Emirates	
200 m backstroke	1:57.44		Ziyad Saleem	Sudan	27 October 2021	Arab Championships	Abu Dhabi, United Arab Emirates	
50 m breaststroke	28.25	h	Abobakr Abass	Stipendium Hungaricum	7 November 2026	Hungarian Championships	Kaposvár, Hungary	
100 m breaststroke	1:01.15	h	Abobakr Abass	Sudan	16 December 2021	World Championships	Abu Dhabi, United Arab Emirates	
200 m breaststroke	2:15.90		Abobakr Abass	Sudan	26 October 2021	Arab Championships	Abu Dhabi, United Arab Emirates	
50m butterfly	26.04	h	Abobakr Abass	Sudan	6 November 2026	Hungarian Championships	Kaposvár, Hungary	
100m butterfly	1:05.84		Badreldin Mohamed	Sudan	19 October 2017	CANA Zone III Championships	Dar es Salaam, Tanzania	
200m butterfly	2:47.87		Badreldin Mohamed	Sudan	20 October 2017	CANA Zone III Championships	Dar es Salaam, Tanzania	
100m individual medley	1:06.04	h	Yousif Ibrahim	Stipendium Hungaricum	8 November 2025	Hungarian Championships	Debrecen, Hungary	
200m individual medley								
400m individual medley								
4×50m freestyle relay	1:45.32		Abdelaziz Abdelaziz; Izzeldin Ahmed; Yousif Bashier; Aboakr Fadlalla	Sudan	20 October 2017	CANA Zone III Championships	Dar es Salaam, Tanzania	
4×100m freestyle relay								
4×200m freestyle relay								
4×50m medley relay								
4×100m medley relay								

Legend: # – Record awaiting ratification by Sudan Amateur Swimming Association; WR – World record; AF – African record; e – equalled existing record;
Records not set in finals: h – heat; sf – semifinal; r – relay 1st leg; rh – relay heat 1st leg; b – B final; † – en route to final mark; so – swim-off; tt – time trial

=== Women ===
Event	Time		Name	Club	Date	Meet	Location	Ref
50 m freestyle	28.99		Rana Saadeldin	Speedo Swim Squads	6 December 2025	Speedo Invitational Meet	Dubai, United Arab Emirates	
100 m freestyle	1:03.64	h	Rana Saadeldin	Sudan	11 December 2024	World Championships	Budapest, Hungary	
200 m freestyle	2:28.46		Badreldin Ridaallah	Sudan	19 October 2017	CANA Zone III Championships	Dar es Salaam, Tanzania	
200 m freestyle	2:18.44	'#'	Rana Saadeldin	Speedo Swim Squads	6 December 2025	Speedo Invitational Meet	Dubai, United Arab Emirates	
400 m freestyle	4:53.98		Rana Saadeldin	Speedo Swim Squads	24 November 2024	Speedo Invitational Meet	Dubai, United Arab Emirates	
800 m freestyle								
1500 m freestyle								
50 m backstroke	41.78	h	Leena Mohamedahmed	Sudan	19 December 2021	World Championships	Abu Dhabi, United Arab Emirates	
100 m backstroke								
200 m backstroke								
50 m breaststroke	48.64		Sami Haneen	Sudan	18 October 2017	CANA Zone III Championships	Dar es Salaam, Tanzania	
100 m breaststroke								
200 m breaststroke								
50 m butterfly	35.94	h	Leena Mohamedahmed	Sudan	10 December 2024	World Championships	Budapest, Hungary	
100 m butterfly	1:11.47		Rana Saadeldin	Speedo Swim Squads	23 November 2024	Speedo Invitational Meet	Dubai, United Arab Emirates	
200 m butterfly								
100 m individual medley	1:15.62		Rana Saadeldin	Speedo Swim Squads	24 November 2024	Speedo Invitational Meet	Dubai, United Arab Emirates	
200 m individual medley								
400 m individual medley								
4×50 m freestyle relay								
4×100 m freestyle relay								
4×200 m freestyle relay								
4×50 m medley relay								
4×100 m medley relay								

Legend: # – Record awaiting ratification by Sudan Amateur Swimming Association; WR – World record; AF – African record; e – equalled existing record;
Records not set in finals: h – heat; sf – semifinal; r – relay 1st leg; rh – relay heat 1st leg; b – B final; † – en route to final mark; so – swim-off; tt – time trial

=== Mixed relay ===
Event	Time	Name	Club	Date	Meet	Location	Ref
4×50 m freestyle relay							
4×50 m medley relay	2:30.56	Sami Haneen; Badreldin Ridaallah; Badreldin Mohamed; Yousif Bashier	Sudan	18 October 2017	CANA Zone III Championships	Dar es Salaam, Tanzania	

Legend: # – Record awaiting ratification by Sudan Amateur Swimming Association; e – equalled existing record;
Records not set in finals: h – heat; so – swim-off
