= Swimming at the 2019 African Games – Men's 4 × 200 metre freestyle relay =

Men's 4 × 200 metre freestyle relay at the 2019 African Games
- Venue: Mohammed V Sports Complex – Olympic Pool
- Dates: 23 August
- Competitors: 16 from 4 nations
- Teams: 4
- Winning time: 7:25.41

Medalists
gold medal	Marwan El-Amrawy; Ahmed Akram; Marwan Elkamash; Yassin El-Shamaa	Egypt
silver medal	Martin Binedell; Brent Szurdoki; Alard Basson; Alaric Basson	South Africa
bronze medal	Mohamed Djaballah; Lounis Khendriche; Ramzi Chouchar; Moncef Aymen Balamane	Algeria

The Men's 4 × 200 metre freestyle relay competition of the 2019 African Games was held on 23 August 2019.

== Records ==
Prior to the competition, the existing world and championship records were as follows.

	Team	Time	Location	Date
World record	United States	6:58.55	Rome	31 July 2009
African record	South Africa	7:08.01	Rome	31 July 2009
Games record	South Africa	7:18.62	Brazzaville	10 September 2015

== Results ==
=== Final ===
The final was started on 23 August.

Rank	Lane	Nation	Swimmers	Time	Notes
1st place, gold medalist(s)	4	Egypt	Marwan El-Amrawy (1:50.98); Ahmed Akram (1:50.98); Marwan Elkamash (1:53.02); Yassin El-Shamaa (1:50.43)	7:25.41	
2nd place, silver medalist(s)	6	South Africa	Martin Binedell (1:51.87); Brent Szurdoki (1:50.79); Alard Basson (1:56.70); Alaric Basson (1:55.77)	7:35.13	
3rd place, bronze medalist(s)	5	Algeria	Mohamed Djaballah (1:53.54); Lounis Khendriche (1:54.87); Ramzi Chouchar (1:55.28); Moncef Aymen Balamane (1:57.80)	7:41.49	
4	3	Morocco	Samy Boutouil (1:56.53); Adil Assouab (1:57.93); Abdeljabbar Regragui (1:57.88); Driss Lahrichi (1:55.35)	7:47.69	NR
