= Swimming at the 2019 African Games – Men's 50 metre backstroke =

Men's 50 metre backstroke at the 2019 African Games
- Venue: Mohammed V Sports Complex – Olympic Pool
- Dates: 23 August (heats and final)
- Competitors: 20 from 13 nations
- Winning time: 25.26

Medalists
gold medal	Mohamed Samy	Egypt
silver medal	Abdellah Ardjoune	Algeria
bronze medal	Driss Lahrichi	Morocco

The Men's 50 metre backstroke competition of the 2019 African Games was held on 23 August 2019.

== Records ==
Prior to the competition, the existing world and championship records were as follows.

	Name	Nation	Time	Location	Date
World record	Kliment Kolesnikov	Russia	24.00	Glasgow	4 August 2018
African record	Gerhard Zandberg	South Africa	24.34	Rome	2 August 2009
Games record	Gerhard Zandberg	South Africa	25.68	Algiers	16 July 2007

The following new records were set during this competition.

Date	Event	Name	Nation	Time	Record
23 August	Final	Mohamed Samy	Egypt	25.26	GR

== Results ==
=== Heats ===
The heats were started on 23 August at 11:25.

Rank	Heat	Lane	Name	Nationality	Time	Notes
1	2	5	Abdellah Ardjoune	Algeria	25.88	Q NR
2	2	4	Driss Lahrichi	Morocco	25.93	Q =NR
3	3	4	Mohamed Samy	Egypt	26.15	Q
4	3	3	Mohamed Bouhamdi	Algeria	26.46	Q
5	3	6	Merwane El Merini	Morocco	26.93	Q
6	1	4	Ali Khalafalla	Egypt	27.08	Q
7	1	5	Martin Binedell	South Africa	27.20	Q
8	1	3	Neil Fair	South Africa	27.22	Q
9	2	3	Jason Arthur	Ghana	27.46	
10	3	5	Steven Aimable	Senegal	27.71	
11	2	6	Niklas Yeboah	Ghana	28.20	
12	2	2	Efrem Ghimai	Eritrea	28.44	
13	1	6	Gregory Anodin	Mauritius	28.61	
14	2	7	Simon Bachmann	Seychelles	29.01	
15	1	2	Andisiwe Tayali	Zimbabwe	29.29	
16	1	7	Swaleh Talib	Kenya	29.50	
17	3	7	Ayman Khatoun	Zimbabwe	29.54	
18	3	1	Seydoli Alaassan	Niger	30.02	
19	3	8	Jamalke Gnakobo	Ethiopia	34.29	
20	3	2	El Hadji Adama Niane	Senegal	39.48	

=== Final ===
The final was started on 23 August at 17:00.

Rank	Lane	Name	Nationality	Time	Notes
1st place, gold medalist(s)	3	Mohamed Samy	Egypt	25.26	GR
2nd place, silver medalist(s)	4	Abdellah Ardjoune	Algeria	25.61	NR
3rd place, bronze medalist(s)	5	Driss Lahrichi	Morocco	26.12	
4	1	Martin Binedell	South Africa	26.64	
5	6	Mohamed Bouhamdi	Algeria	26.67	
6	7	Ali Khalafalla	Egypt	26.88	
7	2	Merwane El Merini	Morocco	27.11	
8	8	Neil Fair	South Africa	27.12	
