= 2023 Arab Swimming Championships =

- Host city: Abu Dhabi, UAE
- Date(s): 27–30 October

The 2023 Arab Swimming Championships was the 6th edition of the Arab Swimming Championships and was held from 27 to 30 October 2023 in Abu Dhabi, UAE.

== Medal standings ==
Host country

Rank	Nation	Gold	Silver	Bronze	Total
1	Algeria (ALG)	13	3	4	20
2	Lebanon (LIB)	10	15	7	32
3	Tunisia (TUN)	6	10	9	25
4	Qatar (QAT)	5	6	4	15
5	Syria (SYR)	4	3	3	10
6	Bahrain (BHR)	2	1	8	11
7	Saudi Arabia (KSA)	1	2	3	6
8	Morocco (MAR)	1	1	2	4
Totals (8 entries)		42	41	40	123

== Results ==
=== Men ===
Games	Gold		Silver	Bronze
50m freestyle				
100m freestyle				
200m freestyle				
400m freestyle				
800m freestyle	Rami Rahmouni; Tunisia	8:15.29	Ilyes Fallagui; Morocco	Heni Mosfar; Tunisia
1500m freestyle				
50m backstroke	Abdellah Ardjoune; Algeria			
100m backstroke	Abdellah Ardjoune; Algeria			
200m backstroke			Abdellah Ardjoune; Algeria	
50m breaststroke				
100m breaststroke	Sultan Alotaibi; Saudi Arabia			
200m breaststroke	Jaouad Syoud; Algeria			
50m butterfly				
100m butterfly				
200m butterfly	Jaouad Syoud; Algeria			
200m individual medley	Jaouad Syoud; Algeria			
400m individual medley	Jaouad Syoud; Algeria			
4x100m freestyle relay				
4x200m freestyle relay				
4x100m Medley Relay				

=== Women ===
Games	Gold	Silver	Bronze
50m freestyle	Nesrine Medjahed; Algeria		
100m freestyle	Nesrine Medjahed; Algeria		
200m freestyle			
400m freestyle			
800m freestyle			
1500m freestyle			
50m backstroke			
100m backstroke			Imene Kawthar Zitouni; Algeria
200m backstroke		Imene Kawthar Zitouni; Algeria	Jihane Benchadli; Algeria
50m breaststroke			
100m breaststroke			
200m breaststroke			
50m butterfly	Nesrine Medjahed; Algeria		
100m butterfly	Nesrine Medjahed; Algeria		
200m butterfly			Jihane Benchadli; Algeria
200m individual medley	Imene Kawthar Zitouni; Algeria		Jihane Benchadli; Algeria
400m individual medley		Imene Kawthar Zitouni; Algeria	
4x100m freestyle relay			
4x200m freestyle relay			
4x100m Medley Relay			

=== Mixed ===
Games	Gold	Silver	Bronze
4x100m freestyle relay	Algeria		
4x100m medley relay	Algeria		
