= Swimming at the 2019 African Games – Men's 200 metre backstroke =

Men's 200 metre backstroke at the 2019 African Games
- Venue: Mohammed V Sports Complex – Olympic Pool
- Dates: 21 August (heats and final)
- Competitors: 9 from 5 nations
- Winning time: 1:59.03

Medalists
gold medal	Martin Binedell	South Africa
silver medal	Abdellah Ardjoune	Algeria
bronze medal	Yassin Elshamaa	Egypt

The Men's 200 metre backstroke competition of the 2019 African Games was held on 21 August 2019.

== Records ==
Prior to the competition, the existing world and championship records were as follows.

	Name	Nation	Time	Location	Date
World record	Aaron Peirsol	United States	1:51.92	Rome	31 July 2009
African record	George Du Rand	South Africa	1:55.75	Rome	30 July 2009
Games record	Darren Murray	South Africa	2:01.74	Maputo	7 September 2011

The following new records were set during this competition.

Date	Event	Name	Nation	Time	Record
21 August	Heats	Martin Binedell	South Africa	2:01.38	GR
21 August	Final	Martin Binedell	South Africa	1:59.03	GR

== Results ==
=== Heats ===
The heats were started on 21 August at 11:15.

Rank	Heat	Lane	Name	Nationality	Time	Notes
1	2	4	Martin Binedell	South Africa	2:01.38	Q GR
2	2	5	Abdellah Ardjoune	Algeria	2:02.73	Q
3	2	3	Yassin Elshamaa	Egypt	2:05.77	Q
4	1	3	Driss Lahrichi	Morocco	2:06.99	Q
5	1	4	Mohamed Bouhamdi	Algeria	2:07.04	Q
6	1	6	Adil Assouab	Morocco	2:08.68	Q
7	1	5	Jason Arthur	Ghana	2:08.76	Q
8	2	2	Mogammad Ra'eez Warley	South Africa	2:08.83	Q
9	2	6	Abdelrahman Hegazy	Egypt	2:09.80	

=== Final ===
The final was started on 21 August at 17:00.

Rank	Lane	Name	Nationality	Time	Notes
1st place, gold medalist(s)	4	Martin Binedell	South Africa	1:59.03	GR
2nd place, silver medalist(s)	5	Abdellah Ardjoune	Algeria	2:00.38	NR
3rd place, bronze medalist(s)	3	Yassin Elshamaa	Egypt	2:03.17	
4	6	Driss Lahrichi	Morocco	2:05.24	
5	2	Mohamed Bouhamdi	Algeria	2:05.94	
6	8	Mogammad Ra'eez Warley	South Africa	2:08.03	
7	7	Adil Assouab	Morocco	2:09.22	
8	1	Jason Arthur	Ghana	2:09.28	
