= 2022 Arab Swimming Championships =

- Host city: Oran, Algeria
- Date: 20–24 July
- Venue: Miloud Hadefi Complex Aquatic Center
- Nations: 12
- Athletes: +200
- Events: 42

The 2022 Arab Swimming Championships (Arabic: البطولة العربية للسباحة 2022) was the 5th edition of the Arab Swimming Championships and was held from 20 to 24 July 2022 in Bir El Djir, Oran, Algeria at the Miloud Hadefi Complex Aquatic Center.

== Participating countries ==
12 countries took part in the competition:

- Algeria
- Egypt
- Iraq
- Jordan
- Tunisia
- Kuwait
- Libya
- Oman
- Palestine
- Qatar
- Saudi Arabia
- Sudan

== Medal standings ==
Host country

Rank	Nation	Gold	Silver	Bronze	Total
1	Egypt (EGY)	23	14	15	52
2	Algeria (ALG)*	14	18	13	45
3	Tunisia (TUN)	1	5	5	11
4	Kuwait (KUW)	1	3	2	6
5	Jordan (JOR)	1	1	4	6
Totals (5 entries)		40	41	39	120

== Results ==
=== Men ===
Games	Gold		Silver		Bronze	
50m freestyle	Oussama Sahnoune; Algeria	22.45	Youssef Ramadan; Egypt	22.57	Abdelrahman Elaraby; Egypt	22.86
100m freestyle	Oussama Sahnoune; Algeria	49.21	Youssef Ramadan; Egypt	49.40	Waleed Abdulrazzaq; Kuwait	50.88
200m freestyle	Marwan Elkamash; Egypt	1:49.36	Yassine El Shammaa; Egypt	1:49.86	Sofiane Achour Talet; Algeria	1:53.55
400m freestyle	Marwan Elkamash; Egypt	3:53.53	Lounis Khendriche; Algeria	3:59.65	Mohamed Khalil Ben Ajmia; Tunisia	4:01.06
800m freestyle	Marwan Elkamash; Egypt	8:11.00	Mohamed Khalil Ben Ajmia; Tunisia	8:15.55	Lounis Khendriche; Algeria	8:20.60
1500m freestyle	Marwan Elkamash; Egypt	15:33.70	Mohamed Moselhy; Egypt	15:46.36	Mohamed Khalil Ben Ajmia; Tunisia	15:55.97
50m backstroke	Ali Al Zamil; Kuwait	25.72	Abdellah Ardjoune; Algeria	25.99	Mehdi Nazim Benbara; Algeria	26.65
100m backstroke	Abdellah Ardjoune; Algeria	55.68	Mohamed Mohamady ( Egypt); Ali Al Zamil ( Kuwait)	56.96		
200m backstroke	Mohamed Mohamady; Egypt	2:00.84 NR	Abdellah Ardjoune; Algeria	2:01.86	Yassine Elshammaa; Egypt	2:03.90
50m breaststroke	Mohamed Eissawy; Egypt	28.37	Adnene Beji; Tunisia	28.60	Amro Al-Wir; Jordan	28.68
100m breaststroke	Amro Al-Wir; Jordan	1:02.64	Adnene Beji; Tunisia	1:03.03	Aimene Moncef Balamane; Algeria	1:03.24
200m breaststroke	Jaouad Syoud; Algeria	2:13.35 NR	Amro Al-Wir; Jordan	2:14.15	Ramzi Chouchar; Algeria	2:18.44
50m butterfly	Abdelrahman El Araby; Egypt	23.86	Waleed Abdulrazzaq; Kuwait	23.93 NR	Youssef Ramadan; Egypt	23.96
100m butterfly	Youssef Ramadan; Egypt	52.15	Waleed Abdulrazzaq; Kuwait	54.29	Abdalla Youssef; Egypt	55.02
200m butterfly	Jaouad Syoud; Algeria	1:58.17	Lounis Khendriche; Algeria	2:03.02	Mohamed Omar; Egypt	2:03.46
200m individual medley	Jaouad Syoud; Algeria	1:58.93	Yassine El Shammaa; Egypt	2:02.85	Ramzi Chouchar; Algeria	2:05.41
400m individual medley	Jaouad Syoud; Algeria	4:19.47	Ramzi Chouchar; Algeria	4:26.47	Kareem Mohammed; Egypt	4:33.52
4x100m freestyle relay	Egypt; Yassine El Shammaa, Marwan Elkamash, Abdelrahman Elaraby, Youssef Ramadan	3:18.96	Algeria; Jaouad Syoud, Fares Benzidoun, Oussama Sahnoune, Mehdi Nazim Benbara	3:20.87 NR	Kuwait; Waleed Abdulrazzaq, Saud Al Shamroukh, Abdulrazzaq Al Dawaihi, Abdulaziz Al Dawaihi	3:30.78
4x200m freestyle relay	Not played					
4x100m Medley Relay	Algeria; Abdellah Ardjoune, Aimene Moncef Balamane, Jaouad Syoud, Oussama Sahnoune	3:39.22 NR	Egypt; Mohamed Mohamady, Mohamed Eissawy, Youssef Ramadan, Abdelrahman Elaraby	3:41.83	No third place^{1}	

^1 Kuwaiti team represented by Ali Al Zamil, Rashed Al Tarmoom, Waleed Abdulrazzaq, Abdulaziz Al Dawaihi were disqualified. Jordanian team withdrew.

=== Women ===
Games	Gold		Silver		Bronze	
50m freestyle	Farida Osman; Egypt	25.80	Nesrine Medjahed; Algeria	26.21	Carine Abdelmalak; Egypt	26.87
100m freestyle	Farida Osman; Egypt	56.06	Nésrine Medjahed; Algeria	57.21	Carine Abdelmalak; Egypt	59.74
200m freestyle	Samara Abdellaoui; Algeria	2:08.73	Rima Benmansour; Algeria	2:09.03	Layla Rabie; Egypt	2:12.86
400m freestyle	Lujaine Abdellah; Egypt	4:25.97	Maram Souissi; Tunisia	4:33.49	Samara Abdellaoui; Algeria	4:33.88
800m freestyle	Maram Souissi; Tunisia	9:21.36	Samara Abdellaoui; Algeria	9:21.43	Layla Rabie; Egypt	9:41.23
1500m freestyle	Nadine Kareem; Egypt	17:53.66	Lamees Elsokkary; Egypt	17:53.72	Maram Souissi; Tunisia	18:04.01
50m backstroke	Samiha Mohsen; Egypt	29.23	Sara Hemida; Egypt	29.95	Meroua Merniz; Algeria	30.46
100m backstroke	Samiha Mohsen; Egypt	1:03.65	Meroua Merniz; Algeria	1:04.04	Sara Hemida; Egypt	1:05.74
200m backstroke	Samiha Mohsen; Egypt	2:20.00	Imene Kawthar Zitouni; Algeria	2:22.42	Meriem Tebal; Algeria	2:26.27
50m breaststroke	Hedy Hamouda; Egypt	33.37	Habiba Belghith; Tunisia	33.71	Ismahane Larbi Youcef; Algeria	34.65
100m breaststroke	Hamida Rania Nefsi; Algeria	1:12.47	Hedy Hamouda; Egypt	1:13.10	Julie Salah; Egypt	1:14.31
200m breaststroke	Hamida Rania Nefsi; Algeria	2:36.07	Rawan Eldamaty; Egypt	2:37.61	Julie Salah; Egypt	2:39.22
50m butterfly	Farida Osman; Egypt	26.12	Sara Hemida; Egypt	28.08	Nesrine Medjahed; Algeria	28.24
100m butterfly	Farida Osman; Egypt	1:00.72	Nesrine Medjahed; Algeria	1:03.18	Rawan Eldamaty; Egypt	1:03.90
200m butterfly	Hlaa Diab; Egypt	2:21.22	Lilia Sihem Midouni; Algeria	2:24.21	Jihane Benchadli; Algeria	2:27.82
200m individual medley	Hamida Rania Nefsi; Algeria	2:21.52	Rawan Eldamaty; Egypt	2:23.18	Jihane Benchadli; Algeria	2:24.24
400m individual medley	Hamida Rania Nefsi; Algeria	4:57.79	Imene Kawthar Zitouni; Algeria	5:03.55	Rawan Eldamaty; Egypt	5:04.69
4x100m freestyle relay	Egypt; Samiha Mohsen, Carine Abdelmalak, Farida Osman, Sara Hemida	3:54.09	Algeria; Lilia Sihem Midouni, Nesrine Medjahed, Rima Benmansour, Jihane Benchadli	3:55.31	Jordan; Mariam Mithqal, Talita Baqlah, Nadine Fanous, Karin Belbeisi	4:13.20
4x200m freestyle relay	Not played					
4x100m Medley Relay	Egypt; Samiha Mohsen, Hedy Hamouda, Farida Osman, Sara Hemida	4:15.31	Algeria; Meroua Merniz, Hamida Rania Nefsi, Imene Kawthar Zitouni, Nesrine Medjahed	4:19.77 NR	Jordan; Karin Belbeisi, Mariam Mithqal, Talita Baqlah, Nadine Fanous	4:46.96

=== Mixed ===
Games	Gold		Silver		Bronze	
4x100m freestyle relay	Algeria; Oussama Sahnoune, Jaouad Syoud, Nesrine Medjahed, Jihane Benchadli	3:37.80 NR	Egypt; Farida Osman, Carine Abdelmalak, Abdelrahman Elaraby, Youssef Ramadan	3:39.80	Jordan; Mohammed Bedour, Mariam Mithqal, Talita Baqlah, Ziyad Al Salous	3:50.02
4x100m medley relay	Egypt; Samiha Mohsen, Mohamed Eissawy, Farida Osman, Youssef Ramadan	3:56.08	Algeria; Abdellah Ardjoune, Hamida Rania Nefsi, Jaouad Syoud, Nesrine Medjahed	3:57.72 NR	Tunisia; Abderrahmen Ben Hadj Salem, Adnene Beji, Roua Ben Fraj, Habiba Belghith	4:08.65
