= Swimming at the 2019 African Games – Men's 200 metre butterfly =

Men's 200 metre butterfly at the 2019 African Games
- Venue: Mohammed V Sports Complex – Olympic Pool
- Dates: 21 August (final)
- Competitors: 8 from 5 nations
- Winning time: 2:01.01

Medalists
gold medal	Jaouad Syoud	Algeria
silver medal	Lounis Khendriche	Algeria
bronze medal	Ahmed Salem	Egypt

The Men's 200 metre butterfly competition of the 2019 African Games was held on 21 August 2019.

== Records ==
Prior to the competition, the existing world and championship records were as follows.

	Name	Nation	Time	Location	Date
World record	Kristóf Milák	Hungary	1:50.73	Gwangju	24 July 2019
African record	Chad le Clos	South Africa	1:52.96	London	31 July 2012
Games record	Chad le Clos	South Africa	1:56.37	Maputo	9 September 2011

== Results ==
=== Final ===
The final was started on 21 August at 17:00.

Rank	Lane	Name	Nationality	Time	Notes
1st place, gold medalist(s)	4	Jaouad Syoud	Algeria	2:01.01	NR
2nd place, silver medalist(s)	6	Lounis Khendriche	Algeria	2:02.49	
3rd place, bronze medalist(s)	5	Ahmed Salem	Egypt	2:03.79	
4	3	Khaled Morad	Egypt	2:04.83	
5	2	Alard Basson	South Africa	2:06.92	
6	7	Ayrton Sweeney	South Africa	2:07.08	
7	8	Abdeljabbar Regragui	Morocco	2:11.44	
8	1	Maaher Harunani	Kenya	2:12.52	
