= Swimming at the 2019 African Games – Men's 100 metre backstroke =

Men's 100 metre backstroke competition of the 2019 African Games

Men's 100 metre backstroke at the 2019 African Games
- Venue: Mohammed V Sports Complex – Olympic Pool
- Dates: 24 August (heats and final)
- Competitors: 16 from 10 nations
- Winning time: 55.02

Medalists
| gold medal | Abdellah Ardjoune | Algeria |
| silver medal | Mohamed Samy | Egypt |
| bronze medal | Martin Binedell | South Africa |

The Men's 100 metre backstroke competition of the 2019 African Games was held on 24 August 2019.

== Records ==
Prior to the competition, the existing world and championship records were as follows.

| | Name | Nation | Time | Location | Date |
|---|---|---|---|---|---|
| World record | Ryan Murphy | United States | 51.85 | Rio de Janeiro | 13 August 2016 |
| African record | Christopher Reid | South Africa | 53.12 | Durban | 11 April 2016 |
| Games record | Charl Crous | South Africa | 55.26 | Maputo | 9 September 2011 |

The following new records were set during this competition.

| Date | Event | Name | Nation | Time | Record |
|---|---|---|---|---|---|
| 24 August | Final | Abdellah Ardjoune | Algeria | 55.02 | GR |

== Results ==
=== Heats ===
The heats were started on 24 August at 11:10.

| Rank | Heat | Lane | Name | Nationality | Time | Notes |
|---|---|---|---|---|---|---|
| 1 | 3 | 4 | Martin Binedell | South Africa | 56.43 | Q |
| 2 | 3 | 5 | Abdellah Ardjoune | Algeria | 56.77 | Q |
| 3 | 1 | 4 | Driss Lahrichi | Morocco | 56.94 | Q |
| 4 | 2 | 4 | Mohamed Samy | Egypt | 57.19 | Q |
| 5 | 2 | 5 | Jason Arthur | Ghana | 57.61 | Q |
| 6 | 3 | 3 | Abdelrahman Hegazy | Egypt | 58.49 | Q |
| 7 | 1 | 5 | Mohamed Bouhamdi | Algeria | 58.65 | Q |
| 8 | 2 | 3 | Adil Assouab | Morocco | 59.01 | Q |
| 9 | 3 | 6 | Xander Skinner | Namibia | 59.28 | |
| 10 | 1 | 3 | Mogammad Ra'eez Warley | South Africa | 59.61 | |
| 11 | 1 | 6 | Simon Bachmann | Seychelles | 1:01.74 | |
| 12 | 2 | 6 | Niklas Yeboah | Ghana | 1:02.59 | |
| 13 | 2 | 2 | Ambala Atuhaire Ogola | Uganda | 1:02.90 | |
| 14 | 1 | 2 | Andisiwe Tayali | Zimbabwe | 1:03.50 | |
| 15 | 3 | 2 | Ayman Khatoun | Zimbabwe | 1:03.57 | |
| 16 | 3 | 7 | Jamalke Gnakobo | Ethiopia | 1:17.19 | |

=== Final ===
The final was started on 24 August at 17:00.

| Rank | Lane | Name | Nationality | Time | Notes |
|---|---|---|---|---|---|
| 1st place, gold medalist(s) | 5 | Abdellah Ardjoune | Algeria | 55.02 | GR |
| 2nd place, silver medalist(s) | 6 | Mohamed Samy | Egypt | 55.57 | |
| 3rd place, bronze medalist(s) | 4 | Martin Binedell | South Africa | 56.20 | |
| 4 | 3 | Driss Lahrichi | Morocco | 56.22 | |
| 5 | 1 | Mohamed Bouhamdi | Algeria | 57.12 | |
| 6 | 2 | Jason Arthur | Ghana | 57.54 | |
| 7 | 7 | Abdelrahman Hegazy | Egypt | 58.30 | |
| 8 | 8 | Adil Assouab | Morocco | 58.46 | |
