= 2016 Arab Swimming Championships =

- Host city: Dubai, United Arab Emirates
- Date(s): 4–7 April
- Venue(s): Hamdan Sports Complex
- Nations participating: 11
- Events: 42

The 3rd Arab Swimming Championships were held from 4 to 7 April 2016 in Dubai, United Arab Emirates at the Hamdan Sports Complex.

== Participating countries ==
- Algeria
- Bahrain
- Egypt
- Iraq
- Jordan
- Lebanon
- Morocco
- Oman
- Palestine
- Tunisia
- United Arab Emirates

== Medal standings ==
Rank	Nation	Gold	Silver	Bronze	Total
1	Egypt (EGY)	19	18	12	49
2	Algeria (ALG)	15	9	10	34
3	Tunisia (TUN)	8	12	17	37
4	Morocco (MAR)	0	2	1	3
5	Jordan (JOR)	0	1	2	3
Totals (5 entries)		42	42	42	126

== Results ==
=== Men ===
Games	Gold		Silver		Bronze	
50m freestyle	Oussama Sahnoune; Algeria	22.27	Salem Ihab; Egypt	22.97	Adham Abdelmajid; Egypt	23.20
100m freestyle	Mohamed Samy; Egypt	49.64	Nazim Belkhodja; Algeria	50.76	Youssef Hammoud; Egypt	50.77
200m freestyle	Mehdi Lagili; Tunisia	1:50.10	Ahmed Akram; Egypt	1:50.33	Omar Elewa; Egypt	1:50.50
400m freestyle	Ahmed Akram; Egypt	4:00.78	Mehdi Lagili; Tunisia	4:01.33	Ahmed Mathlouthi; Tunisia	4:01.40
800m freestyle	Ahmed Akram; Egypt	7:58.59	Ahmed Mathlouthi; Tunisia	8:05.76	Marwan El-Amrawy; Egypt	8:06.41
1500m freestyle	Ahmed Akram; Egypt	15:08.05	Marwan El-Amrawy; Egypt	15:34.93	Mehdi Lagili; Tunisia	15:49.37
50m backstroke	Youssef Abdallah; Egypt	25.75	Marwane El Merini; Morocco	27.01	Riyad Djendouci; Algeria	27.04
100m backstroke	Youssef Abdallah; Egypt	55.32	Driss Lahrichi; Morocco	58.50	Taki Mrabet; Tunisia	58.86
200m backstroke	Abdallah Ardjoune; Algeria	2:06.68	Salah Amine; Egypt	2:07.20	Anis Belghriche; Algeria	2:07.88
50m breaststroke	Wassim Elloumi; Tunisia	28.53	Ahmed Shamlool; Egypt	28.63	Talel Mrabet; Tunisia	29.24
100m breaststroke	Wassim Elloumi; Tunisia	1:02.87	Talel Mrabet; Tunisia	1:02.97	Hassan Yasser; Egypt	1:03.22
200m breaststroke	Talel Mrabet; Tunisia	2:17.24	Wassim Elloumi; Tunisia	2:18.71	Hassan Yasser; Egypt	2:21.59
50m butterfly	Omar Eissa; Egypt	24.24	Youssef Hammoud; Egypt	24.64	Bilel Attig; Tunisia	25.27
100m butterfly	Omar Eissa; Egypt	53.56	Mohamed Samy; Egypt	54.58	Taki Mrabet; Tunisia	55.48
200m butterfly	Ahmed Hamdy; Egypt	2:03.49	Lounis Khendriche; Algeria	2:03.52	Nabil Kaddache; Algeria	2:03.68
200m individual medley	Ahmed Mathlouthi; Tunisia	2:02.62	Taki Mrabet; Tunisia	2:03.49	Salah Amine; Egypt	2:04.72
400m individual medley	Ahmed Mathlouthi; Tunisia	4:21.51	Taki Mrabet; Tunisia	4:21.80	Salah Amine; Egypt	4:26.18
4x100m freestyle relay	Egypt; Omar Eissa, Youssef Hammoud, Salem Ihab, Mohamed Samy	3:22.81	Algeria; Oussama Sahnoune, Lyes Abdelghani Nefsi, Badis Djendouci, Nazim Belkhodja	3:25.03	Tunisia; Mohamed Ali Chaouachi, Ahmed Mathlouthi, Bilel Attig, Mehdi Lagili	3:27.74
4x200m freestyle relay	Egypt; Mohamed Samy, Marwan El-Amrawy, Marwan Elkamash, Omar Elewa	7:23.96	Tunisia; Ahmed Mathlouthi, Taki Mrabet, Mohamed Ali Chaouachi, Mehdi Lagili	7:24.30	Algeria; Neil Kaddache, Imededdine Tchouar, Ramzi Chouchar, Lounis Khendriche	7:51.76
4x100m medley relay	Tunisia; Taki Mrabet, Wassim Elloumi, Bilel Attig, Talel Mrabet	3 min 52 s 78	Algeria; Anis Belghriche, Lyes Abdelghani Nefsi, Badis Djendouci, Nazim Belkhodja	3 min 53 s 19	Morocco; Driss Lahrichi, Ahmed Ridha Ennaïm, Said Saber, Marwane El Merini	3 min 53 s 39

=== Women ===
Games	Gold		Silver		Bronze	
50m freestyle	Farida Osman; Egypt	25.60	Rowan El Badry; Egypt	26.75	Amel Melih; Algeria	26.94
100m freestyle	Farida Osman; Egypt	55.98	Farah Ben Khelil; Tunisia	58.80	Talita Baqlah; Jordan	59.16
200m freestyle	Majda Chebaraka; Algeria	2:04.38	Rim Ouennich; Tunisia	2:04.41	Yasmin Mamdouh; Egypt	2:05.81
400m freestyle	Souad Nafissa Cherouati; Algeria	4:21.78	Rim Ouennich; Tunisia	4:21.99	Roaia Mashaly; Egypt	4:24.41
800m freestyle	Souad Nafissa Cherouati; Algeria	9:55.44	Majda Chebaraka; Algeria	9:55.44	Roaia Mashaly; Egypt	10:12.12
1500m freestyle	Souad Nafissa Cherouati; Algeria	17:12.79	Roaia Mashaly; Egypt	17:25.72	Majda Chebaraka; Algeria	17:30.38
50m backstroke	Amel Melih; Algeria	30.49	Asma Sammoud; Tunisia	30.85	Talita Baqlah; Jordan	31.49
100m backstroke	Amel Melih; Algeria	1:06.23	Mariam Sakr; Egypt	1:06.40	Engy Abu Zayd; Egypt	1:06.76
200m backstroke	Rim Ouennich; Tunisia	2:19.10	Engy Abu Zayd; Egypt	2:20.33	Rania Hamida Nafsi; Algeria	2:25.26
50m breaststroke	Hana Taleb; Algeria	32.58	Mai Atif; Egypt	33.55	Habiba Belghith; Tunisia	33.56
100m breaststroke	Hana Taleb; Algeria	1:11.70	Mai Atif; Egypt	1:13.39	Sarra Lajnef; Tunisia	1:14.26
200m breaststroke	Hana Taleb; Algeria	2:35.56	Rowaida Heshem; Egypt	2:38.09	Sarra Lajnef; Tunisia	2:39.81
50m butterfly	Farida Osman; Egypt	26.52	Talita Baqlah; Jordan	28.54	Asma Sammoud; Tunisia	28.65
100m butterfly	Farida Osman; Egypt	1:00.07	Sarah Hadi; Algeria	1:03.01	Asma Sammoud; Tunisia	1:04.71
200m butterfly	Sarah Hadi; Algeria	2:14.78	Rowaida Heshem; Egypt	2:16.65	Samar Khacha; Algeria	2:22.91
200m individual medley	Rania Hamida Nafsi; Algeria	2:19.83	Rowaida Heshem; Egypt	2:21.53	Sarra Lajnef; Tunisia	2:22.60
400m individual medley	Rania Hamida Nafsi; Algeria	4:54.31	Rowaida Heshem; Egypt	4:56.88	Souad Nafissa Cherouati; Algeria	5:04.31
4x100m freestyle relay	Egypt; Rowan El Badry, Yasmin Mamdouh, Roaia Mashaly, Farida Osman	3:52.66	Algeria; Amel Melih, Nesrine Medjahed, Souad Nafissa Cherouati, Majda Chebaraka	3:55.18	Tunisia; Farah Ben Khelil, Asma Sammoud, Sarra Lajnef, Rim Ouenniche	3:59.80
4x200m freestyle relay	Algeria; Majda Chebaraka, Hamida Rania Nefsi, Sarah Hadi, Souad Nafissa Cherouati	8:35.15	Egypt; Roaia Mashaly, Yasmin Mamdouh, Mariam Sakr, Rowan El Badry	8:36.88	Tunisia; Farah Ben Khelil, Asma Sammoud, Sarra Lajnef, Rim Ouenniche	8:57.98
4x100m medley relay	Egypt; Engy Abu Zayd, Rowaida Heshem, Farida Osman, Rowan El Badry	4:21.01	Algeria; Amel Melih, Hana Taleb, Samar Khacha, Nesrine Medjahed	4:22.29	Tunisia; Rim Ouenniche, Sarra Lajnef, Asma Sammoud, Farah Ben Khelil	4:25.51

=== Mixed ===
Games	Gold		Silver		Bronze	
4x100m freestyle relay	Egypt; Rowan El Badry, Youssef Hammoud, Farida Osman, Mohamed Samy	3:37.22	Algeria; Nazim Belkhodja, Amel Melih, Badis Djendouci, Majda Chebaraka	3:41.01	Tunisia; Rim Ouennich, Mehdi Lagili, Farah Benkhelil, Mohamed Ali Chaouachi	3:43.91
4x100m medley relay	Egypt; Youssef Abdallah, Hassan Yasser, Farida Osman, Rowan El Badry	3:58.87	Tunisia; Rim Ouennich, Farah Benkhelil, Bilel Attig, Mohamed Ali Chaouachi	4:07.83	Algeria; Amel Melih, Sarah Hadi, Oussama Sahnoune, Aymen Benabid	4:11.38
