= Algeria at the 2024 World Aquatics Championships =

- Flag of Algeria
- FINA code: ALG
- National federation: Algerian Swimming Federation
- Website: www.fanatation.dz

in Doha, Qatar
- Competitors: 3 in 1 sport
- Medals: Gold 0 Silver 0 Bronze 0 Total 0

World Aquatics Championships appearances
- 1973; 1975; 1978; 1982; 1986; 1991; 1994; 1998; 2001; 2003; 2005; 2007; 2009; 2011; 2013; 2015; 2017; 2019; 2022; 2023; 2024

Algeria competed at the 2024 World Aquatics Championships in Doha, Qatar from 2 to 18 February.

== Competitors ==
The following is the list of competitors in the Championships.

Sport	Men	Women	Total
Swimming	2	1	3
Total	2	1	3

== Swimming ==
Algeria entered 3 swimmers.

Men

Athlete	Event	Heat		Semifinal		Final	
Athlete	Event	Time	Rank	Time	Rank	Time	Rank
Oussama Sahnoune	50 metre freestyle	22.76	36	Did not advance			
Jaouad Syoud	50 metre butterfly	24.32	37	Did not advance			
Jaouad Syoud	100 metre butterfly	53.96	34	Did not advance			
Jaouad Syoud	200 metre individual medley	2:01.13	15 Q	2:00.11	11	Did not advance	
Jaouad Syoud	400 metre individual medley	4:23.66	16	—		Did not advance	

Women

Athlete	Event	Heat		Semifinal		Final	
Athlete	Event	Time	Rank	Time	Rank	Time	Rank
Amel Melih	50 metre freestyle	25.90	34	Did not advance			
Amel Melih	100 metre freestyle	57.00	31	Did not advance			
Amel Melih	50 metre butterfly	27.34	31	Did not advance			
