= Algeria at the 2017 World Aquatics Championships =

- Flag of Algeria
- World Aquatics code: ALG
- National federation: Algerian Swimming Federation
- Website: www.fanatation.dz

in Budapest, Hungary
- Competitors: 4 in 2 sports
- Medals: Gold 0 Silver 0 Bronze 0 Total 0

World Aquatics Championships appearances
- 1973; 1975; 1978; 1982; 1986; 1991; 1994; 1998; 2001; 2003; 2005; 2007; 2009; 2011; 2013; 2015; 2017; 2019; 2022; 2023; 2024; 2025

Algeria is scheduled to compete at the 2017 World Aquatics Championships in Budapest, Hungary from 14 July to 30 July.

== Open water swimming ==
Algeria has entered one open water swimmer

Athlete	Event	Time	Rank
Souad Cherouati	Women's 5 km	1:02:02.5	33
Souad Cherouati	Women's 10 km	2:08:38.1	39

== Swimming ==
Algerian swimmers have achieved qualifying standards in the following events (up to a maximum of 2 swimmers in each event at the A-standard entry time, and 1 at the B-standard):

Athlete	Event	Heat		Semifinal		Final	
Athlete	Event	Time	Rank	Time	Rank	Time	Rank
Nazim Belkhodja	Men's 50 m butterfly	25.43	55	did not advance			
Mehdi Benbara	Men's 50 m backstroke	26.57	41	did not advance			
Mehdi Benbara	Men's 100 m backstroke	57.59	37	did not advance			
Oussama Sahnoune	Men's 50 m freestyle	22.27	20	did not advance			
Oussama Sahnoune	Men's 100 m freestyle	48.75	14 Q	48.33	9	did not advance	
Souad Cherouati	Women's 800 m freestyle	9:05.67	32	—N/a		did not advance	
Souad Cherouati	Women's 1500 m freestyle	17:25.00	22	—N/a		did not advance	
