= USM Alger (disambiguation) =

USM Alger is an Algerian football club.

USM Alger may also refer to:

- USM Alger (basketball)
- USM Alger Swimming Team
