= Swimming at the 2019 African Games – Men's 4 × 100 metre freestyle relay =

Men's 4 × 100 metre freestyle relay at the 2019 African Games
- Venue: Mohammed V Sports Complex – Olympic Pool
- Dates: 21 August
- Competitors: 28 from 7 nations
- Teams: 7
- Winning time: 3:21.63

Medalists
gold medal	Brad Tandy; Ryan Coetzee; Martin Binedell; Douglas Erasmus	South Africa
silver medal	Abdelrahman Elaraby; Marwan Elkamash; Ali Khalafalla; Mohamed Samy	Egypt
bronze medal	Souhail Hamouchane; Driss Lahrichi; Merwane El Merini; Samy Boutouil	Morocco

The Men's 4 × 100 metre freestyle relay competition of the 2019 African Games was held on 21 August 2019.

== Records ==
Prior to the competition, the existing world and championship records were as follows.

	Team	Time	Location	Date
World record	United States	3:08.24	Beijing	11 August 2008
African record	South Africa	3:11.93	Rome	26 July 2009
Games record	South Africa	3:19.42	Maputo	8 September 2011

== Results ==
=== Final ===
The final was started on 21 August.

Rank	Lane	Nation	Swimmers	Time	Notes
1st place, gold medalist(s)	7	South Africa	Brad Tandy (51.05); Ryan Coetzee (50.61); Martin Binedell (50.12); Douglas Erasmus (49.85)	3:21.63	
2nd place, silver medalist(s)	4	Egypt	Abdelrahman Elaraby (51.57); Marwan Elkamash (51.59); Ali Khalafalla (49.27); Mohamed Samy (49.40)	3:21.83	
3rd place, bronze medalist(s)	3	Morocco	Souhail Hamouchane (52.11); Driss Lahrichi (51.44); Merwane El Merini (52.04); Samy Boutouil (50.33)	3:25.92	NR
4	5	Algeria	Jaouad Syoud (51.32); Mehdi Nazim Benbara (50.77); Ramzi Chouchar (53.01); Moncef Aymen Balamane (52.62)	3:27.72	
5	6	Senegal	Abdoul Niane (52.00); Steven Aimable (51.69); El Hadji Adama Niane (51.44); Adama Ndir (54.17)	3:29.30	NR
6	2	Kenya	Swaleh Talib (53.56); Samuel Ndonga (56.45); Issa Mohamed (53.07); Ridhwan Mohamed (53.04)	3:36.12	
7		Botswana	Kitso Matija (55.62); Ethan Fischer (58.89); Solomon Dzingai (1:00.13); Adrian Robinson (55.29)	3:49.93	
