= Algeria at the 2023 World Aquatics Championships =

- Flag of Algeria
- FINA code: ALG
- National federation: Algerian Swimming Federation

in Fukuoka, Japan
- Competitors: 2 in 1 sport
- Medals: Gold 0 Silver 0 Bronze 0 Total 0

World Aquatics Championships appearances
- 1973; 1975; 1978; 1982; 1986; 1991; 1994; 1998; 2001; 2003; 2005; 2007; 2009; 2011; 2013; 2015; 2017; 2019; 2022; 2023; 2024

Algeria is set to compete at the 2023 World Aquatics Championships in Fukuoka, Japan from 14 to 30 July.

== Swimming ==
Algeria entered 3 swimmers.

Men

Athlete	Event	Heat		Semifinal		Final	
Athlete	Event	Time	Rank	Time	Rank	Time	Rank
Oussama Sahnoune	50 metre freestyle	23.26	58	Did not advance			
Oussama Sahnoune	100 metre freestyle	51.10	56	Did not advance			
Jaouad Syoud	100 metre breaststroke	Did not start					
Jaouad Syoud	50 metre butterfly	Did not start					
Jaouad Syoud	100 metre butterfly	Did not start					
Jaouad Syoud	200 metre butterfly	Did not start					
Jaouad Syoud	200 metre individual medley	Did not start					
Jaouad Syoud	400 metre individual medley	Did not start					

Women

Athlete	Event	Heat		Semifinal		Final	
Athlete	Event	Time	Rank	Time	Rank	Time	Rank
Amel Melih	50 metre freestyle	25.89	41	Did not advance			
Amel Melih	50 metre butterfly	27.79	36	Did not advance			
