= Algeria at the 2013 World Aquatics Championships =

- Flag of Algeria
- FINA code: ALG
- National federation: Algerian Swimming Federation
- Website: www.fanatation.dz

in Barcelona, Spain
- Competitors: 1 in 1 sports
- Medals: Gold 0 Silver 0 Bronze 0 Total 0

World Aquatics Championships appearances
- 1973; 1975; 1978; 1982; 1986; 1991; 1994; 1998; 2001; 2003; 2005; 2007; 2009; 2011; 2013; 2015; 2017; 2019; 2022; 2023; 2024

Algeria is competing at the 2013 World Aquatics Championships in Barcelona, Spain between 19 July and 4 August 2013.

== Swimming ==
Algerian swimmers earned qualifying standards in the following events (up to a maximum of 2 swimmers in each event at the A-standard entry time, and 1 at the B-standard):

Men

Athlete	Event	Heat		Semifinal		Final	
Athlete	Event	Time	Rank	Time	Rank	Time	Rank
Oussama Sahnoune	50 m freestyle	22.41	20	did not advance			
Oussama Sahnoune	100 m freestyle	49.81	27	did not advance			
