= 2018 Arab Swimming Championships =

Swimming competition

- Host city: Radès, Tunisia
- Date: 12–15 July
- Venue: Radès Olympic Pool
- Nations: 12
- Events: 42

The 4th Arab Swimming Championships were held from 12 to 15 July 2018 in Radès, Tunisia at the Radès Olympic Pool.

== Participating countries ==
- Algeria
- Iraq
- Jordan
- Lebanon
- Libya
- Morocco
- Oman
- Palestine
- Saudi Arabia
- Sudan
- Tunisia
- United Arab Emirates

== Medal standings ==
Host country

Rank	Nation	Gold	Silver	Bronze	Total
1	Tunisia (TUN)*	22	17	17	56
2	Algeria (ALG)	9	11	8	28
3	Morocco (MAR)	6	7	2	15
4	Jordan (JOR)	3	4	7	14
5	Lebanon (LIB)	2	3	6	11
6	Saudi Arabia (KSA)	0	0	1	1
6	Yemen (YEM)	0	0	1	1
Totals (7 entries)		42	42	42	126

== Results ==
=== Men ===
Games	Gold		Silver		Bronze	
50m freestyle	Oussama Sahnoune; Algeria	21.82	Souhail Hamouchane; Morocco	22.93	Nazim Belkhodja; Algeria	23.27
100m freestyle	Oussama Sahnoune; Algeria	48.72	Mohamed Aziz Ghaffari; Tunisia	51.19	Nazim Belkhodja; Algeria	51.22
200m freestyle	Khader Baqlah; Jordan	1:47.53	Mehdi Lagili; Tunisia	1:48.50	Mohamed Ayoub Hafnaoui; Tunisia	1:51.22
400m freestyle	Mehdi Lagili; Tunisia	3:53.47	Khader Baqlah; Jordan	3:53.57	Mohamed Ayoub Hafnaoui; Tunisia	3:56.08
800m freestyle	Mehdi Lagili; Tunisia	8:18.78	Lounis Kandrich; Algeria	8:22.77	Malek Louissi; Tunisia	8:26.24
1500m freestyle	Khader Baqlah; Jordan	15:50.20	Mehdi Lagili; Tunisia	16:01.25	Mohamed Anis Jaballah; Algeria	16:13.98
50m backstroke	Driss Lahrichi; Morocco	26.70	Mehdi Nazim Benbara; Algeria	26.84	Mohamed Aziz Ghaffari; Tunisia	27.07
100m backstroke	Driss Lahrichi; Morocco	56.98	Aimen Benabid; Algeria	58.03	Mohamed Aziz Ghaffari; Tunisia	58.26
200m backstroke	Driss Lahrichi; Morocco	2:05.36	Fares Jelassi; Tunisia	2:08.36	Mohamed Aziz Ghaffari; Tunisia	2:09.53
50m breaststroke	Wassim Elloumi; Tunisia	28.28	Abderezak Siar; Algeria	29.03	Adnen Beji; Tunisia	29.44
100m breaststroke	Wassim Elloumi; Tunisia	1:01.39	Adnen Beji; Tunisia	1:03.72	Amro Al Wir; Jordan	1:04.17
200m breaststroke	Wassim Elloumi; Tunisia	2:15.25	Adnen Beji; Tunisia	2:17.44	Amro Al Wir; Jordan	2:19.39
50m butterfly	Oussama Sahnoune; Algeria	24.41	Souhail Hamouchane; Morocco	25.02	Habib Youssef Bouarich; Saudi Arabia	25.06
100m butterfly	Oussama Sahnoune; Algeria	53.50	Khader Baqlah; Jordan	53.94	Mokhtar Al-Yamani; Yemen	56.23
200m butterfly	Said Saber; Morocco	2:02.70	Melek Masmoudi; Tunisia	2:03.43	Lounis Kandrich; Algeria	2:03.66
200m individual medley	Haythem Mbarki; Tunisia	2:05.89	Ramzi Chouchar; Algeria	2:05.97	Melek Masmoudi; Tunisia	2:06.54
400m individual medley	Haythem Mbarki; Tunisia	4:27.63	Melek Masmoudi; Tunisia	4:27.63	Ramzi Chouchar; Algeria	4:28.55
4x100m freestyle relay	Algeria; Mohamed Anis Jaballah, Aimen Benabid, Mehdi Nazim Benbara, Nazim Belkhodja	3:28.79	Tunisia; Mohamed Aziz Ghaffari, Wassim Elloumi, Omar Moussa, Mehdi Lagili	3:28.95	Jordan; Mohammed Omar Bedour, Mohammed Riad Jaber, Khaled Awadallah, Khader Baqlah	3:32.89
4x200m freestyle relay	Tunisia; Mohamed Ayoub Hafnaoui, Mohamed Aziz Ghaffari, Malek Louissi, Mehdi Lagili	7:41.94	Algeria; Mohamed Anis Jaballah, Ramzi Chouchar, Aimen Benabid, Lounis Kandrich	7:48.86	Jordan; Mohammed Omar Bedour, Mohammed Riad Jaber, Khaled Awadallah, Khader Baqlah	7:58.07
4x100m Medley Relay	Tunisia; Mohamed Aziz Ghaffari, Wassim Elloumi, Omar Moussa, Mehdi Lagili	3:48.89	Algeria; Mehdi Nazim Benbara, Abderezak Siar, MohEddine Galdem, Nazim Belkhodja	3:50.27	Morocco; Driss Lahrichi, Ahmed Yassine Fliyou, Said Saber, Souhail Hamouchane	3:53.39

=== Women ===
Games	Gold		Silver		Bronze	
50m freestyle	Nesrine Medjahed; Algeria	26.37	Farah Benkhelil; Tunisia	26.41	Talita Baqlah; Jordan	26.83
100m freestyle	Farah Benkhelil; Tunisia	57.68	Nesrine Medjahed; Algeria	57.92	Ines Barbouch; Tunisia	59.21
200m freestyle	Rim Ouennich; Tunisia	2:06.03	Gabriella Doueihy; Lebanon	2:06.30	Mana Kchok; Tunisia	2:08.54
400m freestyle	Rim Ouennich; Tunisia	4:28.06	Gabriella Doueihy; Lebanon	4:28.63	Rebecca Mezher; Lebanon	4:34.88
800m freestyle	Gabriella Doueihy; Lebanon	9:06.94	Alya Gara; Tunisia	9:16.93	Rebecca Mezher; Lebanon	9:29.88
1500m freestyle	Gabriella Doueihy; Lebanon	17:23.65	Alya Gara; Tunisia	17:35.61	Ons Maalaoui; Tunisia	18:21.94
50m backstroke	Farah Ben Khelil; Tunisia	29.98	Hiba Fahsi; Morocco	30.33	Talita Baqlah; Jordan	31.06
100m backstroke	Rim Ouennich; Tunisia	1:04.38	Hiba Fahsi; Morocco	1:04.82	Mana Kchok; Tunisia	1:07.22
200m backstroke	Rim Ouennich; Tunisia	2:21.39	Mana Kchok; Tunisia	2:23.78	Hiba Fahsi; Morocco	2:23.93
50m breaststroke	Imane Houda El Barodi; Morocco	33.57	Nesrine Jelliti; Tunisia	33.98	Habiba Belghith; Tunisia	34.18
100m breaststroke	Imane Houda El Barodi; Morocco	1:14.62	Habiba Belghith; Tunisia	1:15.30	Nesrine Jelliti; Tunisia	1:14.82
200m breaststroke	Habiba Belghith; Tunisia	2:39.87	Rania Hamida Nafsi; Algeria	2:40.18	Nesrine Jelliti; Tunisia	2:41.59
50m butterfly	Talita Baqlah; Jordan	28.60	Nesrine Medjahed; Algeria	28.87	Hiba Doueihy; Lebanon	29.25
100m butterfly	Nesrine Medjahed; Algeria	1:03.26	Hiba Doueihy; Lebanon	1:04.09	Ines Barbouch; Tunisia	1:04.31
200m butterfly	Alya Gara; Tunisia	2:21.73	Mariem Imen Kaldi; Algeria	2:25.65	Hiba Doueihy; Lebanon	2:27.26
200m individual medley	Rania Hamida Nafsi; Algeria	2:22.55	Farah Benkhelil; Tunisia	2:30.48	lidya Safadi; Jordan	2:33.07
400m individual medley	Rania Hamida Nafsi; Algeria	5:00.75	Alya Gara; Tunisia	5:01.70	Nesrine Jelliti; Tunisia	5:09.64
4x100m freestyle relay	Tunisia; Mana Kchok, Farah Benkhelil, Ines Barbouch, Rim Ouennich	3:57.10	Morocco; Imane Houda El Barodi, Noura Mana, Hiba Fahsi, Yasmeen Boutouil	4:00.33	Lebanon; Rebecca Mezher, Marie Khoury, Jennifer Mallah, Gabriella Doueihy	4:03.17
4x200m freestyle relay	Tunisia; Mana Kchok, Farah Benkhelil, Ines Barbouch, Rim Ouennich	8:38.70	Morocco; Noura Mana, Hiba Laknit, Hiba Fahsi, Yasmeen Boutouil	8:54.02	Lebanon; Hiba Doueihy, Rebecca Mezher, Marie Khoury, Gabriella Doueihy	8:55.42
4x100m medley relay	Tunisia; Rim Ouennich (1:05.63); Habiba Belghith (1:14.19); Ines Barbouch (1:04.10); Farah Benkhelil (57.57)	4:21.49	Morocco; Hiba Fahsi (1:06.36); Imane El Barodi (1:13.55); Hiba Laknit (1:06.65); Noura Mana (58.97)	4:25.53	Algeria; Imen Zitouni (1:09.05); Rania Nafsi (1:16.01); Mariem Kaldi (1:07.76); Nesrine Medjahed (58.13)	4:30.95

=== Mixed ===
Games	Gold		Silver		Bronze	
4x100m freestyle relay	Tunisia; Mohamed Aziz Ghaffari, Rim Ouennich, Farah Benkhelil, Mehdi Lagili	3:38.90	Jordan; Khader Baqlah, Mohammed Omar Bedour, Rahaf Baqlah, Talita Baqlah	3:42.36	Algeria; Mehdi Nazim Benbara, Nesrine Medjahed, Rania Hamida Nafsi, Nazim Belkhodja	3:44.22
4x100m medley relay	Tunisia; Rim Ouennich, Wassim Elloumi, Ines Barbouch, Mohamed Aziz Ghaffari	4:03.99	Jordan; Talita Baqlah, Mohammed Omar Bedour, Rahaf Baqlah, Amro El Wir	4:07.77	Algeria; Rania Hamida Nafsi, Mehdi Nazim Benbara, Nesrine Medjahed, Nazim Belkhodja	4:08.97
