= Ghana at the 2019 African Games =

- Flag of Ghana
- IOC code: GHA
- NOC: Ghana Olympic Committee

in Rabat, Morocco 19 August 2019 – 31 August 2019
- Competitors: 91 in 14 sports
- Flag bearer: Derek Abrefa
- Medals Ranked 15th: Gold 2 Silver 2 Bronze 9 Total 13

African Games appearances
- 1965; 1973; 1978; 1987; 1991; 1995; 1999; 2003; 2007; 2011; 2015; 2019; 2023

Ghana competed at the 2019 African Games held from 19 to 31 August 2019 in Rabat, Morocco. Ghana competed in 14 sports. Ghana's participation was made possible by financial support from the Ghanaian government. In total, athletes representing Ghana won two gold medals, two silver medals and nine bronze medals and the country finished in 15th place in the medal table.

== Medal summary ==
=== Medal table ===
| Medal | Name | Sport | Event | Date |
|---|---|---|---|---|
| Gold | Sean Safo-Antwi; Benjamin Azamati-Kwaku; Martin Owusu-Antwi; Joseph Amoah | Athletics | Men's 4 × 100 metres relay | 28 August |
| Gold | Rose Amoanimaa Yeboah | Athletics | Women's high jump | 27 August |
| Silver | Forrester Osei | Weightlifting | Men's 89 kg Clean & Jerk | 28 August |
| Silver | Deborah Acquah | Athletics | Women's long jump | 29 August |
| Bronze | Winnifred Ntumi | Weightlifting | Women's 45 kg Snatch | 25 August |
| Bronze | Winnifred Ntumi | Weightlifting | Women's 45 kg Clean & Jerk | 25 August |
| Bronze | Winnifred Ntumi | Weightlifting | Women's 45 kg | 25 August |
| Bronze | David Akwei | Weightlifting | Men's 61 kg Clean & Jerk | 26 August |
| Bronze | Shakul Samed | Boxing | Men's light heavyweight (81kg) | 28 August |
| Bronze | Grace Obour | Athletics | Women's 400 metres | 28 August |
| Bronze | Christian Amoah | Weightlifting | Men's 89 kg Snatch | 28 August |
| Bronze | Christian Amoah | Weightlifting | Men's 89 kg Clean & Jerk | 28 August |
| Bronze | Christian Amoah | Weightlifting | Men's 89 kg | 28 August |

Medals by sport
| Sport | 1st place, gold medalist(s) | 2nd place, silver medalist(s) | 3rd place, bronze medalist(s) | Total |
| Athletics | 2 | 1 | 1 | 4 |
| Boxing | 0 | 0 | 1 | 1 |
| Weightlifting | 0 | 1 | 7 | 8 |
| Total | 2 | 2 | 9 | 13 |

== Athletics ==
Ghana competed in athletics. The following male athletes competed: Sean Safo-Antwi, Benjamin Azamati, Edwin Gadayi, Joseph Paul Amoah, Martin Owusu Antwi, Jeff Hammond and Abubakar Mohammed. The following female athletes competed: Hor Halutie, Flings Owusu Agyapong, Gemima Acheampong, Persis William-Mensah, Regina Yeboah, Grace Obour, Deborah Acquah, Rose Yeboah and Abigail Kwarteng.

Sean Safo-Antwi, Benjamin Azamati-Kwaku, Martin Owusu-Antwi and Joseph Amoah won the gold medal in the men's 4 × 100 metres relay event.

Rose Amoanimaa Yeboah won the gold medal in the women's high jump event.

Deborah Acquah won the silver medal in the women's long jump event.

Grace Obour won the bronze medal in the women's 400 metres event.

== Badminton ==
Ghana competed in badminton with four male athletes: Ebenezer Andrews, Michael Baah, Emmanuel Botwe and Daniel Sam.

They competed in the men's singles event and in the men's doubles event.

== Beach volleyball ==
Kelvin Katey Carboo and Samuel Tetteh Essilfie competed in beach volleyball in the men's tournament. They finished in 8th place.

== Boxing ==
Ghana competed in boxing. In total, eight men and two women represented Ghana in boxing.

== Cycling ==
Ghana competed in cycling.

== Fencing ==
Ghana competed in fencing. Abubakari Alhassan Samba, Bashiru Iddrisu, Eric Mallick and Isaac Teinor competed in several events in fencing.

== Football ==
Ghana's national under-20 football team competed in the men's tournament at the 2019 African Games. Emmanuel Toku was the team captain.

The team played in three matches in the group stage and did not advance to the semi-finals.

== Judo ==
Five athletes competed in judo: Victor Ahiavor, Eleazer Dodoo, Lambert Fiazuku, Frank Terkpor and Bismark Yartey.

== Karate ==
Edmund Asante Amoako, Dickson Acolatse, Patrick Amakye, Emmanuel Kobina Agyei and Felix Donkor competed in karate.

== Swimming ==
Three athletes represented Ghana in swimming:

Men

| Athlete | Event | Heat | | Final | |
| Athlete | Event | Time | Rank | Time | Rank |
|---|---|---|---|---|---|
| Jason Arthur | 50 m backstroke | 27.46 | 9 | did not advance | |
| Jason Arthur | 100 m backstroke | 57.61 | 5 Q | 57.54 | 6 |
| Jason Arthur | 200 m backstroke | 2:08.76 | 7 Q | 2:09.28 | 8 |
| Abeku Jackson | 50 m freestyle | 23.57 | 10 | did not advance | |
| Abeku Jackson | 50 m butterfly | 24.62 | 6 Q | 24.50 | 7 |
| Abeku Jackson | 100 m butterfly | 55.20 | 9 | did not advance | |
| Niklas Yeboah | 50 m backstroke | 28.20 | 11 | did not advance | |
| Niklas Yeboah | 100 m backstroke | 1:02.59 | 12 | did not advance | |
| Niklas Yeboah | 50 m butterfly | 25.41 | 13 | did not advance | |
| Niklas Yeboah | 100 m butterfly | 57.36 | 15 | did not advance | |

== Table tennis ==
Ghana competed in table tennis. No medals were won.

Derek Abrefa was among the table tennis players to represent Ghana.

== Taekwondo ==
Five athletes competed in Taekwondo.

| Athlete | Event | Round of 32 | Round of 16 | Quarterfinals | Semifinals | Final | |
| Athlete | Event | Opposition Result | Opposition Result | Opposition Result | Opposition Result | Opposition Result | Rank |
|---|---|---|---|---|---|---|---|
| Kezia Gbedze | Women's –46 kg | —N/a | Mbubu (COD); L 11–37 | did not advance | | | |
| Henrietta Amarh | Women's –49 kg | —N/a | Seck (SEN); W 29–8 | Coulibaly (CIV); L 24–14 | did not advance | | |
| Benson Nii Adom Addo | Men's –58 kg | Bye | Betel (CHA); L 9–17 | did not advance | | | |
| Selasi Damalie | Men's –63 kg | —N/a | Khezami (TUN); L 3–23 | did not advance | | | |
| Julian Nii Aryee | Men's –68 kg | Lô (SEN); L 2–28 | did not advance | | | | |

== Tennis ==
Herman Abban, Isaac Teitei Nortey, Benjamin Palm, Johnson Acquah and coach Fred Egyir represented Ghana in tennis.

== Weightlifting ==
Ghana competed in weightlifting. In total, athletes representing Ghana won one silver medal and seven bronze medals in weightlifting.

Winnifred Ntumi won all three bronze medals in the women's 45 kg events.

David Akwei won the bronze medal in the men's 61 kg Clean & Jerk event.

Christian Amoah won the bronze medals in the men's 89 kg events. Forrester Osei also won the silver medal in the men's 89 kg Clean & Jerk event.
