= Swimming at the 2019 African Games – Men's 400 metre individual medley =

Swimming competition

Men's 400 metre medley at the 2019 African Games
- Venue: Mohammed V Sports Complex – Olympic Pool
- Dates: 22 August
- Competitors: 7 from 4 nations
- Winning time: 4:23.53

Medalists
gold medal	Ramzi Chouchar	Algeria
silver medal	Ayrton Sweeney	South Africa
bronze medal	Ahmed Salem	Egypt

The Men's 400 metre medley competition of the 2019 African Games was held on 22 August 2019.

== Records ==
Prior to the competition, the existing world and championship records were as follows.

	Name	Nation	Time	Location	Date
World record	Michael Phelps	United States	4:03.84	Beijing	10 August 2008
African record	Oussama Mellouli	Tunisia	4:10.53	Pescara	29 June 2009
Games record	Chad le Clos	South Africa	4:16.88	Maputo	6 September 2011

== Results ==
Rank	Lane	Name	Nationality	Time	Notes
1st place, gold medalist(s)	6	Ramzi Chouchar	Algeria	4:23.53	
2nd place, silver medalist(s)	4	Ayrton Sweeney	South Africa	4:26.88	
3rd place, bronze medalist(s)	3	Ahmed Salem	Egypt	4:28.35	
4	7	Neil Fair	South Africa	4:28.55	
5	5	Jaouad Syoud	Algeria	4:31.50	
6	2	Yassin Elshamaa	Egypt	4:37.70	
7	1	Abdeljabbar Regragui	Morocco	4:47.15	
