= Tunisian Swimming Federation =

National governing body for aquatic sports in Tunisia

- الجامعة التونسية للسباحة; Fédération Tunisienne de Natation
- Sport: Swimming, open water swimming and water polo
- Jurisdiction: National
- Abbreviation: FTN
- Founded: 1956
- Affiliation: World Aquatics
- Regional affiliation: Africa Aquatics
- Affiliation date: 1970
- Headquarters: El Menzah, Tunis, Tunisia
- President: Hédia Mansour

Official website
- www.ftndigital.com
- (Tunisia)

The Tunisian Swimming Federation (French: Fédération Tunisienne de Natation, FTN) is the national governing body for swimming, open water swimming and water polo in Tunisia. Founded in 1956, it organises the national championships, manages the national teams and affiliates some 45 clubs and more than 5,000 licensed swimmers. It is a member of World Aquatics and a founding member of the African confederation Africa Aquatics.

Tunisian swimmers trained under the federation have won three Olympic gold medals, through Oussama Mellouli in 2008 and 2012 and Ahmed Hafnaoui in 2021, and Ahmed Jaouadi won two world titles in 2025. In May 2024 the federation's board was dissolved by the Tunisian government after the national flag was concealed at a meet it organised while Tunisia was under World Anti-Doping Agency sanctions, and World Aquatics installed a stabilization committee to run it until new elections.

== History ==
The federation was founded in 1956, the year of Tunisian independence. In 1970 it was one of the seven founding members of the African Swimming Confederation (CANA), now Africa Aquatics, alongside Algeria, Morocco, Egypt, Nigeria, Senegal and Guinea. It is affiliated to World Aquatics under the country code TUN, with its headquarters at the El Menzah Olympic pool in Tunis.

The federation's swimmers account for half of Tunisia's Olympic gold medals. Oussama Mellouli won the 1500-metre freestyle at the 2008 Summer Olympics in Beijing and the 10-kilometre open water race at the 2012 Summer Olympics in London, and Ahmed Hafnaoui won the 400-metre freestyle at the 2020 Summer Olympics in Tokyo. In 2025 Ahmed Jaouadi won the 800-metre and 1500-metre freestyle at the 2025 World Aquatics Championships in Singapore. The same year Al Jazeera reported that these results were achieved with very limited infrastructure: Tunisia had eleven swimming pools in total, of which only three were open, the largest being the Olympic pool at Radès south of Tunis.

Tunisia hosted the 2018 Arab Swimming Championships at the Radès Olympic pool from 12 to 15 July 2018, finishing top of the medal table.

== Competitions ==
The federation runs the national championships in pool swimming, open water and water polo, and the Tunisian Cup in water polo.

=== Tunisian Open Masters ===
Since 2016 the federation has organised the Tunisian Open Masters (TOM), an annual international masters swimming meet for swimmers aged 25 and over, launched in partnership with the French Swimming Federation, which publishes its results. The meet combines a long course pool programme at Radès with open water races at Yasmine Hammamet, and is held each May. Announced entries have ranged from 250 swimmers from 18 countries in 2022 to 350 swimmers from 29 countries in 2019. Regular overseas entrants have included the French masters world champion Nicolas Granger and Mouhamedou Diop of Senegal, president of Africa Aquatics; at the 2026 edition Jean-Claude Lestideau of France set a European masters record in the 80 to 84 age group.

Year	Dates	Venue	Swimmers	Countries
2016	21–23 October	Radès		
2019	1–3 May	Radès	350	29
2022	11–15 May	Radès, Hammamet	250	18
2024	8–12 May	Radès, Yasmine Hammamet	c. 300	20
2025	6–10 May	Radès, Yasmine Hammamet	330	18
2026	12–17 May	Radès, Yasmine Hammamet		

Entries as announced by the organisers. Editions not listed are not covered by the sources cited.

== Controversies ==
=== 2024 flag affair and dissolution ===
In April 2024 the World Anti-Doping Agency declared Tunisia's national anti-doping agency (ANAD) non-compliant with the World Anti-Doping Agency (WADA), one consequence being that the Tunisian flag could not be flown at covered sporting events. During the seventh Tunisian Open Masters at Radès Olympic Swimming Pool, the flag was covered with a red cloth while those of the other participating nations were displayed. On 10 May 2024 President Kais Saied made an unannounced visit to the pool, raised the flag himself and ordered criminal and administrative measures.

The Ministry of Youth and Sports dissolved the federation's board the same day and appointed a provisional bureau chaired by Mohamed Zribi. In the following days seven sports officials were arrested, among them the federation's president and the former director general of ANAD, Mourad Hambli. On 14 May World Aquatics approved a stabilization committee, also chaired by Zribi, to run the federation's day-to-day operations, amend its constitution and hold new elections within six months. WADA reinstated ANAD as compliant on 15 May 2024, and in June called publicly for Hambli's release, with the support of the national anti-doping organisations of France, Kenya and South Africa.

=== Governance since 2024 ===
The provisional bureau ran the federation for eighteen months. At an elective general assembly on 20 December 2025 a single list led by Hédia Mansour obtained the required majority, and she became president for the 2025 to 2028 term. On 24 April 2026 Mansour and other members of the bureau announced their resignation, citing "pressures and threats" and what she described as administrative and financial irregularities inherited from the previous management. In July 2026 La Presse de Tunisie noted that she nevertheless remained in office.

== See also ==
- Sport in Tunisia
- List of Tunisian records in swimming
- Tunisia men's national water polo team
