= Algeria at the 2011 World Aquatics Championships =

- Flag of Algeria
- FINA code: ALG
- National federation: Algerian Swimming Federation
- Website: www.fanatation.dz

in Shanghai, China
- Competitors: 2 in 1 sports
- Medals: Gold 0 Silver 0 Bronze 0 Total 0

World Aquatics Championships appearances
- 1973; 1975; 1978; 1982; 1986; 1991; 1994; 1998; 2001; 2003; 2005; 2007; 2009; 2011; 2013; 2015; 2017; 2019; 2022; 2023; 2024

Algeria competed at the 2011 World Aquatics Championships in Shanghai, China between July 16 and 31, 2011.

== Swimming ==
Algeria qualified 2 swimmers.

Men

Athlete	Event	Heats		Semifinals		Final	
Athlete	Event	Time	Rank	Time	Rank	Time	Rank
Nabil Kebbab	50 m freestyle	DNS		Did not advance			
Nabil Kebbab	100 m freestyle	49.85	33	Did not advance			
Nabil Kebbab	50 m breaststroke	28.25	26	Did not advance			
Nabil Kebbab	100 m breaststroke	1:04.50	61	Did not advance			
Sofiane Daid	200 m breaststroke	2:18.32	37	Did not advance			
