= Jason Arthur =

Ghanaian swimmer

Personal information
- Born: 18 November 1997 (age 28)

Sport
- Sport: Swimming

Jason Arthur (born 18 November 1997) is a Ghanaian swimmer. In 2019, he represented Ghana at the 2019 World Aquatics Championships in Gwangju, South Korea.

In 2018, he represented Ghana at the 2018 Commonwealth Games held in Gold Coast, Australia.

In 2019, he represented Ghana at the 2019 African Games held in Rabat, Morocco. He competed in the men's 50 metre backstroke, men's 100 metre backstroke and men's 200 metre backstroke events. His best result came in the 100 metre event where he finished in 6th place in the final.
