= 2024 African Swimming Championships =

16th African Swimming Championships
- Host city: Luanda, Angola
- Date(s): 30 April–4 May
- Nations participating: 42
- Events: 42

The 16th African Swimming Championships were held from 30 April to 4 May 2024 in Luanda, Angola.

== Medal table ==
* Host nation (Angola)

Rank	Nation	Gold	Silver	Bronze	Total
1	Egypt (EGY)	15	19	13	47
2	South Africa (RSA)	13	14	11	38
3	Algeria (ALG)	9	5	11	25
4	Sudan (SUD)	2	1	0	3
5	Senegal (SEN)	1	1	3	5
6	Uganda (UGA)	1	1	2	4
7	Mauritius (MRI)	1	0	0	1
8	Angola (ANG)*	0	1	0	1
9	Ghana (GHA)	0	0	1	1
9	Tunisia (TUN)	0	0	1	1
Totals (10 entries)		42	42	42	126

== Medal summary ==
=== Men ===
Games	Gold		Silver		Bronze	
50m freestyle	Abdelrahman Adnan; Egypt	22.59	Omar Radwan; Egypt	22.61	Clayton Jimmie; South Africa	22.65
100m freestyle	Clayton Jimmie; South Africa	50.44	Kris Mihaylov; South Africa	50.63	Harry Stacey; Ghana	50.67
200m freestyle	Abdalla Nasr; Egypt	1:50.54	Ibrahim Shams El Din; Egypt	1:51.09	Fares Benzidoune; Algeria	1:53.14
400m freestyle	Kris Mihaylov; South Africa	3:57.14	Ibrahim Shams El Din; Egypt	3:58.88	Marwan El-Amrawy; Egypt	3:59.14
800m freestyle	Kris Mihaylov; South Africa	8:19.68	Marwan El-Amrawy; Egypt	8:20.83	Ahmed Ali; Egypt	8:31.73
1500m freestyle	Kris Mihaylov; South Africa	15:52.62	Marwan El-Amrawy; Egypt	16:03.08	Ahmed Ali; Egypt	16:23.22
50m backstroke	Abdelrahman Atia; Egypt	26.26	Ziyad Saleem; Sudan	26.29	Steven Kilian Aimable; Senegal	26.55
100m backstroke	Ziyad Saleem; Sudan	56.37	Abdelrahman Atia; Egypt	56.97	Lance Cromhout; South Africa	57.55
200m backstroke	Ziyad Saleem; Sudan	2:02.64	Abdelrahman Adnan; Egypt	2:04.72	Adrian van Wyk; South Africa	2:05.55
50m breaststroke	Chris Smith; South Africa	27.66	Mohamed Hossam; Egypt	28.04	Jaouad Syoud; Algeria	28.22
100m breaststroke	Chris Smith; South Africa	1:02.16	Jaouad Syoud; Algeria	1:02.63	Mohamed Hossam; Egypt	1:03.10
200m breaststroke	Jaouad Syoud; Algeria	2:15.14	Karim Mahmoud; Egypt	2:18.73	Ramzi Chouchar; Algeria	2:18.94
50m butterfly	Omar Radwan; Egypt	24.34	Jarden Eaton; South Africa	24.38	Abdelrahman Adnan; Egypt	24.60
100m butterfly	Abdalla Nasr; Egypt	53.49	Jarden Eaton; South Africa	53.57	Abdelrahman Adnan; Egypt	54.11
200m butterfly	Abdalla Nasr; Egypt	2:00.06	Jaouad Syoud; Algeria	2:01.68	Fares Benzidoune; Algeria	2:03.20
200m individual medley	Jaouad Syoud; Algeria	2:02.12	Karim Mahmoud; Egypt	2:05.24	Ramzi Chouchar; Algeria	2:09.37
400m individual medley	Jaouad Syoud; Algeria	4:24.17	Karim Mahmoud; Egypt	4:28.23	Ramzi Chouchar; Algeria	4:30.49
4 × 100 m freestyle relay	Egypt; Mohamed Yasser Omar; Ibrahim Shams El Din; Abdelrahman Adnan; Abdalla Nasr	3:23.53	Algeria; Mohamed Abdelhakim Hamour; Fares Benzidoune; Mehdi Nazim Benbara; Jaouad Syoud	3:24.25	South Africa; Jarden Eaton; Benjamin Plattner; Adrian van Wyk; Kris Mihaylov	3:32.19
4 × 200 m freestyle relay	Egypt; Mohamed Yasser Omar; Marwan El-Amrawy; Ibrahim Shams El Din; Abdalla Nasr	7:33.92	Algeria; Mohamed Abdelhakim Hamour; Fares Benzidoune; Jaouad Syoud; Ramzi Chouchar	7:41.35	South Africa; Adrian van Wyk; Lance Cromhout; Ethan Bailey; Kris Mihaylov	7:43.79
4 × 100 m medley relay	Egypt; Abdelrahman Atia; Mohamed Hossam; Abdalla Nasr; Abdelrahman Adnan	3:43.37	South Africa; Lance Cromhout; Chris Smith; Jarden Eaton; Clayton Jimmie	3:44.36	Algeria; Mehdi Nazim Benbara; Jaouad Syoud; Fares Benzidoune; Mohamed Abdelhakim Hamour	3:48.13

=== Women ===
Games	Gold		Silver		Bronze	
50m freestyle	Amel Melih; Algeria	25.73	Kirabo Namutebi; Uganda	25.86	Gloria Muzito; Uganda	25.88
100m freestyle	Gloria Muzito; Uganda	56.78	Nadine Amin; Egypt	57.62	Oumy Diop; Senegal	58.16
200m freestyle	Lojine Hamed; Egypt	2:04.84	Corne van Schalkwyk; South Africa	2:05.08	Lamees Elsokkary; Egypt	2:10.19
400m freestyle	Lojine Hamed; Egypt	4:25.38	Corne van Schalkwyk; South Africa	4:27.97	Lamees Elsokkary; Egypt	4:29.35
800m freestyle	Lojine Hamed; Egypt	9:10.72	Lamees Elsokkary; Egypt	9:12.76	Marony Jacobs; South Africa	9:22.85
1500m freestyle	Lojine Hamed; Egypt	17:41.48	Lamees Elsokkary; Egypt	17:43.33	Marony Jacobs; South Africa	17:53.09
50m backstroke	Sara El-Sammany; Egypt	29.58	Cassidy Burgess; South Africa	29.84	Oumy Diop; Senegal	30.23
100m backstroke	Cassidy Burgess; South Africa	1:03.08	Sara El-Sammany; Egypt	1:04.12	Grace Morris; South Africa	1:04.38
200m backstroke	Anishta Teeluck; Mauritius	2:17.96	Grace Morris; South Africa	2:20.20	Cassidy Burgess; South Africa	2:22.98
50m breaststroke	Lara van Niekerk; South Africa	31.05	Simone Moll; South Africa	31.29	Kirabo Namutebi; Uganda	32.99
100m breaststroke	Simone Moll; South Africa	1:08.05	Lara van Niekerk; South Africa	1:09.07	Habiba Belghith; Tunisia	1:13.15
200m breaststroke	Lara van Niekerk; South Africa	2:33.34	Simone Moll; South Africa	2:33.45	Hamida Rania Nefsi; Algeria	2:34.11
50m butterfly	Amel Melih; Algeria	27.14	Oumy Diop; Senegal	27.67	Sara El-Sammany; Egypt	27.73
100m butterfly	Oumy Diop; Senegal	1:02.55	Jaime Mote; South Africa	1:02.85	Nesrine Medjahed; Algeria	1:03.20
200m butterfly	Jaime Mote; South Africa	2:18.70	Lia Lima; Angola	2:20.22	Jasmine Eissa; Egypt	2:22.95
200m individual medley	Rania Hamida Nefsi; Algeria	2:20.59	Nadine Amin; Egypt	2:20.87	Grace Morris; South Africa	2:24.36
400m individual medley	Rania Hamida Nefsi; Algeria	4:57.10	Nadine Amin; Egypt	5:08.26	Jasmine Eissa; Egypt	5:12.02
4 × 100 m freestyle relay	Algeria; Amel Melih; Lilia Siham Midouni; Majda Chebaraka; Nesrine Medjahed	3:52.09 NR	South Africa; Corne van Schalkwyk; Grace Morris; Lara van Niekerk; Jaime Mote	3:55.93	Egypt; Hla Naanoush; Lamees Elsokkary; Lojine Hamed; Nadine Amin	3:56.59
4 × 200 m freestyle relay	Egypt; Lojine Hamed; Hla Naanoush; Nadine Amin; Lamees Elsokkary	8:39.23	South Africa; Marony Jacobs; Jaime Mote; Grace Morris; Corne van Schalkwyk	8:46.26	Algeria; Nesrine Medjahed; Majda Chebaraka; Hamida Rania Nefsi; Lilia Siham Midouni	8:48.24
4 × 100 m medley relay	South Africa; Cassidy Burgess; Simone Moll; Jaime Mote; Corne van Schalkwyk	4:16.91	Egypt; Sara El-Sammany; Ganat Soliman; Hla Naanoush; Nadine Amin	4:24.73	Algeria; Nesrine Medjahed; Rania Hamida Nefsi; Lilia Siham Midouni; Majda Chebaraka	4:30.87

=== Mixed ===
Games	Gold		Silver		Bronze	
4 × 100 m freestyle relay	Algeria; Mehdi Nazim Benbara; Amel Melih; Nesrine Medjahed; Jaouad Syoud	3:36.92	Egypt; Mohamed Yasser Omar; Sara El-Sammany; Nadine Amin; Abdelrahman Adnan	3:39.16	South Africa; Jaime Mote; Grace Morris; Adrian van Wyk; Jarden Eaton	3:45.10
4 × 100 m medley relay	South Africa; Lance Cromhout; Lara van Niekerk; Jaime Mote; Clayton Jimmie	4:00.86	Algeria; Mehdi Nazim Benbara; Jaouad Syoud; Nesrine Medjahed; Amel Melih	4:01.02	Egypt; Sara El-Sammany; Youssef El-Kamash; Abdelrahman Adnan; Nadine Amin	4:01.74

Results:
