= USM Alger Swimming Team =

USM Alger
- Leagues: Algerian Swimming Championship
- Founded: 1978
- Arena: Piscine du complexe Mohamed boudiaf
- Location: 2, avenue Ziar Abdelkader Bab El Oued; Algiers, Algeria 16007
- Team colors: black, Red
- President: Fouad Djabrouni
- Head coach: Ali Maansri
- Championships: Algerian Championship

Union sportive de la médina d'Alger (Swimming) (Arabic: الإتحاد الرياضي لمدينة الجزائر للسباحة), referred to as USM Alger SN for a short, is a swimming club based in Algiers, Algeria that played in the Algerian Swimming Championship is the best club in algeria the male category, and especially females.

== History ==
USM Alger Swimming Team was founded in 1978 and is considered one of the strongest clubs in Algeria with GS Pétroliers, especially in the girls category, where it often controls its championships in all categories. On June 20, 2020, while training swimmer Manal Haboub died of a heart attack at the age of 17, while she was preparing to pass the baccalaureate exams. 48 hours after the death in the middle of training in the pool of the Mohamed Boudiaf complex, the swimming federation imposed a medical certificate of good health for any athlete who goes to training. An administrative measure which releases all responsibility of the clubs and the federation for any incident or drama which occurs in the basin. If an athlete does not present the famous document, he will not be able to take part in the training.

Following the decision of Saïd Allik not to seek another term, a significant transition took place within USM Alger’s Club Sportif Amateur (CSA). After over 30 years at the helm, Allik expressed his desire to pass the torch and give an opportunity to new leadership. On September 18, 2024, Djabrouni Fouad, a long-time member of the club’s judo section, was elected as the new president of CSA/USMA. Djabrouni won the vote with 16 out of 24 ballots cast, defeating the other candidate, treasurer Khebaz Hamid, who received 7 votes.

== Honours ==
- Algerian Swimming Championship

Algerian OPEN Swimming Champion 2013–14, 2015–16, 2021
Algerian JUNIOR Swimming Champion 2013–14
Champion of Algeria by Points Minimes 2016–17 Girls and boys in Setif
Champion of Algeria Benjamins 2016–17 Girls and boys
Algerian Swimming interclubs Champion 2017.

- Algerian JUNIOR Swimming runners–up Girls and boys 2020.
- Boys 5 gold, 7 silver and 6 bronze
- Girls 6 gold and 2 silver

== Notable Swimmers ==
- Oussama Sahnoune
- Mohamed Ryad Bouhamidi
- Ramzi Chouchar
- Lounis Khendriche
- Jugurtha Boumali
- Nazim Belkhodja
- Moncef Aymen Balamane
