= Martin Binedell =

South African swimmer (born 1995)

Personal information
- Born: 30 July 1995 (age 30) Pietermaritzburg, South Africa
- Height: 1.87 m (6 ft 2 in)
- Weight: 87 kg (192 lb)

Sport
- Sport: Swimming
Medal record
Men's swimming
Representing South Africa
Commonwealth Games
Bronze medal – third place	2018 Gold Coast	4×100 m medley
African Games
Gold medal – first place	2015 Brazzaville	200 m backstroke
Gold medal – first place	2019 Rabat	200 m backstroke
Gold medal – first place	2019 Rabat	4×100 m freestyle
Gold medal – first place	2019 Rabat	4×100 m medley
Gold medal – first place	2019 Rabat	4×100 m mixed medley
Silver medal – second place	2019 Rabat	4×200 m freestyle
Bronze medal – third place	2019 Rabat	100 m backstroke
African Championships
Gold medal – first place	2016 Bloemfontein	200 m backstroke
Gold medal – first place	2021 Accra	200 m backstroke
Silver medal – second place	2021 Accra	100 m backstroke

Martin Binedell (born 30 July 1995) is a South African swimmer. He competed in the men's 200 metre backstroke event at the 2017 World Aquatics Championships. In 2019, he represented South Africa at the 2019 African Games held in Rabat, Morocco. He also competed in the men's 200 metre backstroke event at the 2020 Summer Olympics.
