= Arab Swimming Championships =

Sport competition

- Status: active
- Genre: sporting event
- Date: mid-year
- Frequency: Biennial
- Location: various
- Inaugurated: 2012
- Most recent: Abu Dhabi 2023
- Previous event: Oran 2022
- Next event: TBD
- Organiser: ASC

The Arab Swimming Championships (Arabic: البطولة العربية للسباحة) are the Arab championships in the sport of Swimming. It is organized by the Arab Swimming Confederation (ASC) and held biennially. The first edition was held in August 2012 in Amman, Jordan.

== Championships ==
=== Long Course ===
Year	Dates	Edition	Location	Countries	Athletes	Events	Events Details	Winner	Second	Third
2012	28–31 August	1	Amman, Jordan	9	85	?	? (M), ? (W), ? (Mix.)	Algeria	Kuwait	Jordan
2014	4–7 September	2	Casablanca, Morocco	10	~100	42	20 (M), 20 (W), 2 (Mix.)	Egypt	Algeria	Jordan
2016	4–7 April	3	(United Arab Emirates) Dubai, UAE	11	135	42	20 (M), 20 (W), 2 (Mix.)	Egypt	Algeria	Tunisia
2018	12–15 July	4	Radès, Tunisia	12	?	42	20 (M), 20 (W), 2 (Mix.)	Tunisia	Algeria	Morocco
2022	20–24 July	5	Oran, Algeria	12	+200	42	20 (M), 20 (W), 2 (Mix.)	Egypt	Algeria	Tunisia
2023	27–30 October	6	(United Arab Emirates) Abu Dhabi, UAE	16				Algeria	Lebanon	Tunisia

=== Short Course ===
Year	Dates	Edition	Location	Countries	Athletes	Events	Events Details	Winner	Second	Third
2021	24–27 October	1	(United Arab Emirates) Abu Dhabi, UAE	16	174	100	? (M), ? (W), ? (Mix.)	Egypt	Tunisia	Qatar

== See also ==
- Junior Arab Swimming Championships
- Arab Aquatics Championships
