= Algeria at the 2019 World Aquatics Championships =

- Flag of Algeria
- FINA code: ALG
- National federation: Fédération Algérienne de Natation

in Gwangju, South Korea
- Competitors: 3 in 1 sport
- Medals: Gold 0 Silver 0 Bronze 0 Total 0

World Aquatics Championships appearances
- 1973; 1975; 1978; 1982; 1986; 1991; 1994; 1998; 2001; 2003; 2005; 2007; 2009; 2011; 2013; 2015; 2017; 2019; 2022; 2023; 2024

Algeria competed at the 2019 World Aquatics Championships in Gwangju, South Korea from 12 to 28 July.

== Swimming ==
Algeria has entered three swimmers.

Men

Athlete	Event	Heat		Semifinal		Final	
Athlete	Event	Time	Rank	Time	Rank	Time	Rank
Oussama Sahnoune	50 m freestyle	22.37	24	did not advance			
Oussama Sahnoune	100 m freestyle	49.08	23	did not advance			
Jaouad Syoud	200 m individual medley	2:01.76	27	did not advance			
Jaouad Syoud	400 m individual medley	4:28.65	30	—		did not advance	

Women

Athlete	Event	Heat		Semifinal		Final	
Athlete	Event	Time	Rank	Time	Rank	Time	Rank
Souad Cherouati	800 m freestyle	9:12.30	35	—		did not advance	
Souad Cherouati	1500 m freestyle	17:25.12	28	—		did not advance	
