= Ziyad Saleem =

Sudanese-American swimmer

Personal information
- Born: March 24, 2003 (age 23) Milwaukee, Wisconsin, U.S.
- Education: University of California, Berkeley
- Height: 6 ft 3 in (191 cm)
- Weight: 180 lb (82 kg)

Sport
- Country: Sudan
- Sport: Swimming
- Strokes: Backstroke
- College team: California Golden Bears
Medal record
Men's swimming
Representing Sudan
African Championships
Gold medal – first place	2024 Luanda	100 m backstroke
Gold medal – first place	2024 Luanda	200 m backstroke
Silver medal – second place	2024 Luanda	50 m backstroke
Islamic Solidarity Games
Silver medal – second place	2021 Konya	200 m backstroke
Bronze medal – third place	2021 Konya	100 m backstroke

Ziyad Saleem (born 24 March 2003) is a Sudanese-American swimmer. Born in the United States, he competes internationally for Sudan. He competed at the 2024 Summer Olympics.

== Early life ==
Saleem was born on 24 March 2003 in Milwaukee, Wisconsin, being one of three children. His parents and much of his family comes from Sudan, with most having fled the country due to war. He has dual Sudanese-American citizenship. He began swimming at a young age, with his parents having enrolled him in a course at age three.

Saleem attended Rufus King International High School in Milwaukee where he competed for the swimming team, being a four-time finalist in the Wisconsin DI state championships. As a junior, he won the 100m backstroke event at the Wisconsin DI championships with a time of 49.3 seconds. He was a USA Swimming Scholastic All-American in 2020. Saleem also competed for the Schroeder YMCA swimming team. He was a finalist in the 100m and 200m at the 2019 Minneapolis Sectional tournament, competed at the 2019 Junior Nationals and won the 200m backstroke event at the 2020 Wisconsin 13&O Championships.

Saleem signed to swim in college for the California Golden Bears.

== College career ==
Saleem competed for California as a freshman in the 2021–22 season, being a member of the California team that won the Pac-12 Conference championship and the National Collegiate Athletic Association (NCAA) national championship. In 2022–23, he competed at the Pac-12 Championships and reached the finals of the 100m backstroke event. He helped the Golden Bears win another team NCAA national championship in 2023.

== International career ==
Saleem competes internationally for Sudan. In 2019, he competed at the CANA Junior African Championships in Tunisia, winning three silver medals (in the 50, 100 and 200 backstroke) and being the first Sudanese since the country's independence to advance to the finals of an event. In 2021, he won three gold medals at the Arab Swimming Age Group Championships, and he also participated at the FINA World Swimming Championships (25m) that year for Sudan.

Saleem competed at the FINA World Championships in 2022 and won a silver and bronze medal at the 2021 Islamic Solidarity Games (held in 2022). He also won a silver and bronze medal at the 2022 African Swimming Championships. He placed 24th in the 200m backstroke at the 2023 World Aquatics Championships. In 2024, he won a total of three medals – two gold (100m, 200m backstroke) and one silver (50m backstroke) – at the African Swimming Championships. He became Sudan's first-ever gold medalist at the event.

Saleem later received a spot to represent Sudan at the 2024 Summer Olympics. Competing in the 200m backstroke, where he placed 9th. ,.
