= Abdellah Ardjoune =

Algerian swimmer (born 2001)

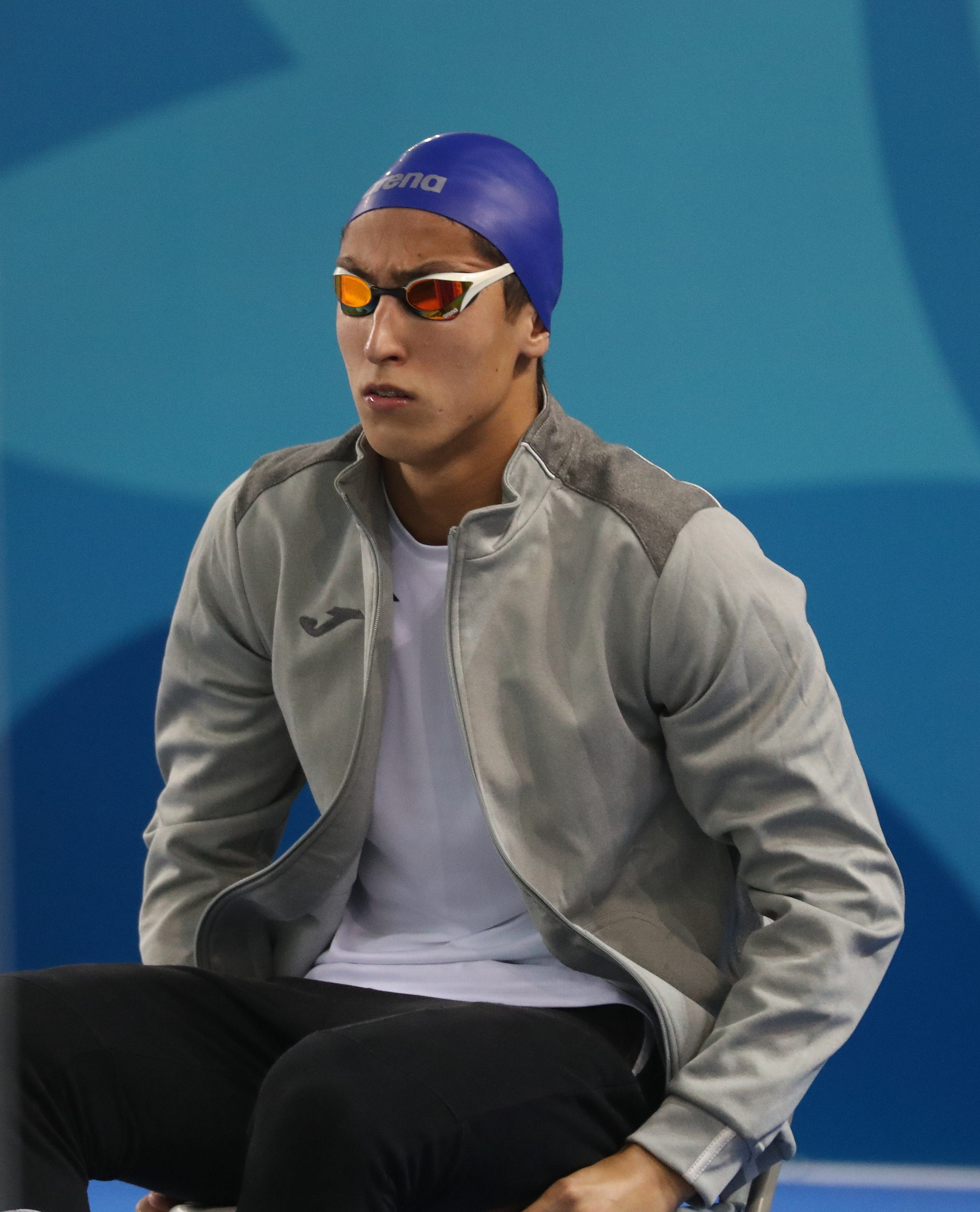

Personal information
- Born: 21 February 2001 (age 25)

Sport
- Sport: Swimming
Medal record
Men's swimming
Representing Algeria
African Games
Gold medal – first place	2019 Rabat	100 m backstroke
Silver medal – second place	2019 Rabat	50 m backstroke
Silver medal – second place	2019 Rabat	200 m backstroke
Bronze medal – third place	2019 Rabat	4×100 m medley relay
African Championships
Gold medal – first place	2022 Tunis	100 m backstroke
Gold medal – first place	2022 Tunis	200 m backstroke
Silver medal – second place	2021 Accra	50 m backstroke
Silver medal – second place	2022 Tunis	50 m backstroke
Silver medal – second place	2022 Tunis	4×100 m medley relay
Silver medal – second place	2022 Tunis	4×100 m mixed medley
Bronze medal – third place	2018 Algiers	50 m backstroke

Abdellah Ardjoune (born 21 February 2001) is an Algerian swimmer.

He represented Algeria at the 2018 Summer Youth Olympics held in Buenos Aires, Argentina and at the 2018 African Swimming Championships held in Algiers, Algeria.

He competed in swimming at the 2019 African Games held in Rabat, Morocco. He won the gold medal in the 100 metre backstroke event. He also set a new Games record in this event with a time of 55.02. He won the silver medals in both the 50 metre backstroke and 200 metre backstroke events. He also won the bronze medal in the 4 × 100 m medley relay event.

He represented Algeria at the 2022 Mediterranean Games held in Oran, Algeria. He competed in the 50 metre backstroke, 100 metre backstroke and 200 metre backstroke events. He also competed in the men's 4 × 100 metre medley relay.
