= Jaouad Syoud =

Algerian swimmer (born 1999)

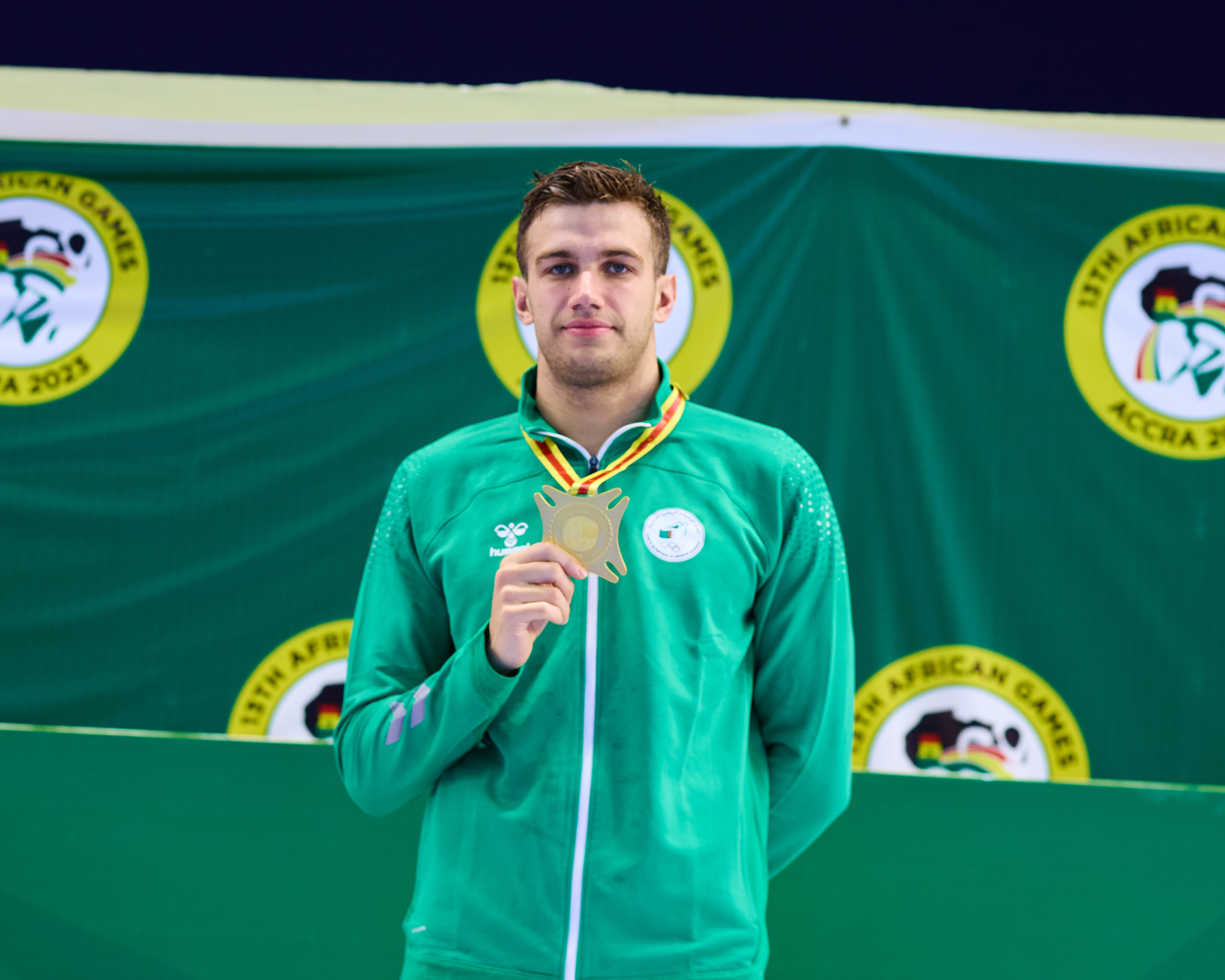
- Syoud wins gold in 2023 African Games.

Personal information
- Full name: Jaouad Syoud
- Born: 17 September 1999 (age 26) Constantine, Algeria

Sport
- Sport: Swimming
- Club: Olympic Nice
Medal record
Men's swimming
Representing Algeria
Event	1st	2nd	3rd
Mediterranean Games	1	1	1
African Championships	19	10	5
Arab Championships	12	2	0
African Games	6	1	6
Arab Games	11	0	0
Islamic Solidarity Games	3	3	0
Total	52	17	12
African Games
Gold medal – first place	2019 Rabat	200 m butterfly
Gold medal – first place	2019 Rabat	200 m medley
Gold medal – first place	2023 Accra	200 m breaststroke
Gold medal – first place	2023 Accra	400 m individual medley
Gold medal – first place	2023 Accra	50 m breaststroke
Gold medal – first place	2023 Accra	200 m individual medley
Silver medal – second place	2023 Accra	100 m breaststroke
Bronze medal – third place	2019 Rabat	4×100 m medley
Bronze medal – third place	2019 Rabat	4×100 m mixed freestyle
Bronze medal – third place	2023 Accra	4 x 200 m freestyle relay
Bronze medal – third place	2023 Accra	4 x 100 m med relay mixed
Bronze medal – third place	2023 Accra	4 x 100 m free relay mixed
Bronze medal – third place	2023 Accra	4 x 100 m medley relay
African Championships
Gold medal – first place	2026 Oran	50 m backstroke
Gold medal – first place	2026 Oran	200 m breaststroke
Gold medal – first place	2026 Oran	200 m butterfly
Gold medal – first place	2026 Oran	200 m medley
Gold medal – first place	2026 Oran	400 m medley relay
Gold medal – first place	2026 Oran	4×100 m medley
Gold medal – first place	2024 Luanda	200 m breaststroke
Gold medal – first place	2024 Luanda	200 m medley
Gold medal – first place	2024 Luanda	400 m medley
Gold medal – first place	2024 Luanda	4×100 m freestyle relay mixed
Gold medal – first place	2022 Tunis	50 m breaststroke
Gold medal – first place	2022 Tunis	100 m breaststroke
Gold medal – first place	2022 Tunis	200 m breaststroke
Gold medal – first place	2022 Tunis	200 m butterfly
Gold medal – first place	2022 Tunis	200 m medley
Gold medal – first place	2022 Tunis	400 m medley
Gold medal – first place	2022 Tunis	4×100 m medley
Gold medal – first place	2021 Accra	100 m butterfly
Gold medal – first place	2021 Accra	200 m medley
Silver medal – second place	2026 Oran	4×100 m freestyle relay mixed
Silver medal – second place	2024 Luanda	100 m breaststroke
Silver medal – second place	2024 Luanda	200 m butterfly
Silver medal – second place	2024 Luanda	4×100 m freestyle relay
Silver medal – second place	2024 Luanda	4×200 m freestyle relay
Silver medal – second place	2024 Luanda	4×100 m medley relay mixed
Silver medal – second place	2022 Tunis	100 m butterfly
Silver medal – second place	2022 Tunis	4×100 m freestyle relay
Silver medal – second place	2022 Tunis	4×100 m freestyle relay mixed
Silver medal – second place	2022 Tunis	4×100 m medley relay mixed
Bronze medal – third place	2026 Oran	4×100 m freestyle relay
Bronze medal – third place	2026 Oran	4×200 m freestyle relay
Bronze medal – third place	2024 Luanda	50 m breaststroke
Bronze medal – third place	2024 Luanda	4×100 m medley relay
Bronze medal – third place	2021 Accra	100 m breaststroke
Mediterranean Games
Gold medal – first place	2022 Oran	200 m medley
Silver medal – second place	2022 Oran	100 m butterfly
Bronze medal – third place	2022 Oran	200 m butterfly
Islamic Solidarity Games
Gold medal – first place	2021 Konya	200 m medley
Gold medal – first place	2021 Konya	400 m medley
Gold medal – first place	2025 Riyadh	400 m medley
Silver medal – second place	2021 Konya	200 m butterfly
Silver medal – second place	2025 Riyadh	200 m medley
Silver medal – second place	2025 Riyadh	200 m breaststroke
Arab Swimming Championships
Gold medal – first place	2023 Abu Dhabi	200 m breaststroke
Gold medal – first place	2023 Abu Dhabi	200 m butterfly
Gold medal – first place	2023 Abu Dhabi	200 m medley
Gold medal – first place	2023 Abu Dhabi	400 m medley
Gold medal – first place	2023 Abu Dhabi	4×100 m mixed freestyle relay
Gold medal – first place	2023 Abu Dhabi	4×100 m mixed medley relay
Gold medal – first place	2022 Oran	200 m medley
Gold medal – first place	2022 Oran	400 m medley
Gold medal – first place	2022 Oran	200 m butterfly
Gold medal – first place	2022 Oran	200 m breaststroke
Gold medal – first place	2022 Oran	4×100 m medley relay
Gold medal – first place	2022 Oran	4×100 m mixed freestyle relay
Silver medal – second place	2022 Oran	4×100 m freestyle relay
Silver medal – second place	2022 Oran	4×100 m mixed medley relay
Arab Games
Gold medal – first place	2023 Oran	50 m Breaststroke
Gold medal – first place	2023 Oran	50 m Butterfly
Gold medal – first place	2023 Oran	100 m Butterfly
Gold medal – first place	2023 Oran	200 m Butterfly
Gold medal – first place	2023 Oran	200 m Individual Medley
Gold medal – first place	2023 Oran	400 m Individual Medley
Gold medal – first place	2023 Oran	4 × 100 m Freestyle Relay
Gold medal – first place	2023 Oran	4 × 100 m Medley Relay
Gold medal – first place	2023 Oran	4 × 200 m Freestyle Relay
Gold medal – first place	2023 Oran	4 × 100 m Freestyle Relay
Gold medal – first place	2023 Oran	4 × 100 m Medley Relay

Jaouad Syoud (born 17 September 1999) is an Algerian swimmer. He is a six-time gold medalist at the African Games.

== Career ==
He competed in the men's 200 metre individual medley event at the 2018 FINA World Swimming Championships (25 m) held in Hangzhou, China.

He also represented Algeria at the 2019 World Aquatics Championships in Gwangju, South Korea in the 200 metre individual medley and 400 metre individual medley events.

He also competed in swimming at the 2019 African Games held in Morocco. He won two gold medals and two bronze medals.

He represented Algeria at the 2022 Mediterranean Games held in Oran, Algeria. In total, he won one gold, one silver and one bronze medal.

== Major results ==
=== Individual ===
==== Long course ====
Year	Competition	Venue	Position	Event	Notes
Representing Algeria
2019	World Championships	Gwangju, South Korea	27th (h)	200 m medley	2:01.76
2019	World Championships	Gwangju, South Korea	30th (h)	400 m medley	4:28.65
2019	African Games	Casablanca, Morocco	4th	100 m butterfly	53.95
2019	African Games	Casablanca, Morocco	1st	200 m butterfly	2:01.01
2019	African Games	Casablanca, Morocco	1st	200 m medley	2:02.49
2019	African Games	Casablanca, Morocco	4th	400 m medley	4:31.55

==== Short course ====
Year	Competition	Venue	Position	Event	Notes
Representing Algeria
2018	World Championships	Hangzhou, China	30th (h)	200 m medley	2:00.10

=== Relay ===
==== Long course ====
Year	Competition	Venue	Position	Event	Notes
Representing Algeria
2019	African Games	Casablanca, Morocco	3rd	4 × 100 m medley	3:43.47
2019	African Games	Casablanca, Morocco	3rd	4 × 200 m freestyle	7:41.49

Arab Championship, Abu Dhabi 2021

year	competition	venue	position	Event	Notes
Representing Algerie
2021	Arab short course Championship	Abu dhabi, UAE	1st	400 m medley	
2021	Arab short course Championship	Abu dhabi, UAE	1st	200 m medley	
2021	Arab short course Championship	Abu dhabi, UAE	1st	100 m medley	
2021	Arab short course Championship	Abu dhabi, UAE	1st	200 m butterfley	
