= Ramzi Chouchar =

Algerian swimmer (born 1997)

Personal information
- Born: 16 June 1997 (age 29)

Sport
- Sport: Swimming
- Club: USM Alger
Medal record
Men's swimming
Representing Algeria
African Games
Gold medal – first place	2019 Rabat	400 m individual medley
Bronze medal – third place	2019 Rabat	4×200 m freestyle relay
Bronze medal – third place	2019 Rabat	4×100 m freestyle relay mixed
African Championships
Silver medal – second place	2024 Luanda	4×200 m freestyle relay
Bronze medal – third place	2021 Accra	200 m butterfly
Bronze medal – third place	2021 Accra	3 km open water
Bronze medal – third place	2024 Luanda	200 m breaststroke
Bronze medal – third place	2024 Luanda	200 m individual medley
Bronze medal – third place	2024 Luanda	400 m individual medley

Ramzi Chouchar (born 16 June 1997) is an Algerian swimmer.

He competed at the 2017 Islamic Solidarity Games and the 2018 Mediterranean Games. He also competed at the 2016 Arab Swimming Championships and 2018 Arab Swimming Championships as well as the 2016 African Swimming Championships and the 2018 African Swimming Championships.

He represented Algeria at the 2019 African Games held in Rabat, Morocco. He won the gold medal in the men's 400 metres individual medley event. He also won the bronze medals in the men's 4×200 metres freestyle relay and the mixed 4×100 metres freestyle relay events. Chouchar only swam in the heats in the mixed 4×100 metres freestyle relay event.

He represented Algeria at the 2022 Mediterranean Games held in Oran, Algeria. He competed in the men's 100 metre breaststroke and men's 200 metre breaststroke events as well as the men's 200 metre individual medley and men's 400 metre individual medley events.
