= Driss Lahrichi =

Moroccan swimmer (born 1997)

Personal information
- Born: 2 December 1997 (age 28)

Sport
- Sport: Swimming
Medal record
Men's swimming
Representing Morocco
African Games
Bronze medal – third place	2019 Rabat	50 m backstroke
Bronze medal – third place	2019 Rabat	4×100 m freestyle
Bronze medal – third place	2019 Rabat	4×100 m mixed medley
African Championships
Bronze medal – third place	2016 Bloemfontein	50 m backstroke
Bronze medal – third place	2016 Bloemfontein	4×200 m freestyle
Bronze medal – third place	2016 Bloemfontein	4×100 m medley

Driss Lahrichi (born 2 December 1997) is a Moroccan swimmer. He competed in the men's 100 metre backstroke event at the 2016 Summer Olympics. In 2019, he represented Morocco at the 2019 African Games held in Rabat, Morocco.
