= Nesrine Medjahed =

Algerian swimmer (born 1999)

Personal information
- Nationality: Algerian
- Born: 28 August 1999 (age 27) Mostaganem, Algeria

Sport
- Sport: Swimming
- Strokes: Freestyle

Nesrine Medjahed (born 28 August 1999) is an Algerian swimmer. She competed in the women's 100m freestyle event at the 2024 Summer Olympics, where she finished 24th in the heats.
