= Algerian Aquatics Federation =

National governing body for the sport of swimming in Algeria

Coordinates: 36°45′56.5″N 2°59′17.4″E

- الإتحاد الجزائري للألعاب المائية; Fédération Algérienne de Natation
- Sport: Swimming, Water polo, Diving, Artistic swimming, Open water swimming and High diving
- Jurisdiction: National
- Founded: 1962
- Affiliation: World Aquatics
- Regional affiliation: Africa Aquatics
- Affiliation date: 1970
- Headquarters: Dély Ibrahim, Algiers, Algeria
- President: Zahafi Nasreddine
- Secretary: Medjhoum Abdelkrim

Official website
- www.fanatation.dz
- (Algeria)

Former logo

The Algerian Aquatics Federation (French: Fédération Algérienne de Natation) is the national governing body for the aquatic sports of swimming, water polo, diving, artistic swimming, open water swimming and high diving in Algeria. The body oversees the management and development of the sport from the national team at the elite level, the conduct of national and international events, through to grass roots participation.

The national governing body was founded by Mustapha Larfaoui in 1962, the same year Algeria gained its independence from France, and joined FINA shortly afterwards. Larfaoui served as president between 1962 and 1983 and from 1985 to 1989.

In 1970, the federation became a founding member of the African continental confederation CANA (now Africa Aquatics), alongside Morocco, Tunisia, Egypt, Nigeria, Senegal and Guinea.

It is also a member of the Arab Swimming Confederation and the Mediterranean Swimming Confederation.

The organisation is currently led by Zahafi Nasreddine as president and Medjhoum Abdelkrim as general secretary.
