= 2010 African Swimming Championships =

International swimming competition

10th African Swimming Championships
- Host city: Casablanca, Morocco
- Date: September 13–19, 2010
- Venue(s): Mohammed V Sport Complex (pool); Sidi Abbed beach (open water}
- Nations: 21
- Athletes: 220+
- Events: 42

The 10th African Swimming Championships were held September 13–19, 2010 in Casablanca, Morocco. The event was hosted by the Royal Moroccan Swimming Federation. It featured pool competition in a 50m (long course) pool; and Open Water races.

Competition locations were:

- pool: Mohammed V Sport Complex (Complexe sportif Mohammed V)
- open water: Sidi Abbed beach in Temara.

== Participating countries ==
Over 200 swimmers from 21 countries participated in the 10th Championships, making it the largest ever (both in terms of number of swimmers and number of countries). Countries which sent teams were:

- Algeria
- Angola
- Benin
- Cameroon^{1}
- Congo
- Côte d'Ivoire
- Egypt
- Ghana
- Guinea
- Kenya
- Lesotho
- Libya
- Madagascar
- Mauritius
- Morocco
- Namibia
- Niger
- Nigeria
- Senegal
- South Africa
- Tunisia
- ^{1} While swimmers from Cameroon entered the Championships, they did not attend the meet (reportedly because they could not afford the plane tickets to Morocco).

== Schedule ==
Date	Monday; 13 September 2010	Tuesday; 14 September 2010	Wednesday; 15 September 2010	Thursday; 16 September 2010
E v e n t s	100 free (w); 100 breast (m); 400 IM (w); 200 free (m); 50 back (w); 50 back (m); 4x200 Free Relay (w)	100 fly (m); 200 free (w); 400 IM (m); 200 breast (w); 50 breast (m); 50 fly (w); 800 free (m)	400 free (w); 100 free (m); 100 back (w); 200 back (m); 50 breast (w); 50 fly (m); 4x100 Free Relay (w); 4x200 Free Relay (m)	100 fly (w); 400 free (m); 100 breast (w); 200 breast (m); 800 free (w); 4x100 Free Relay (m)
Date	Friday; 17 September 2010	Saturday; 18 September 2010	Sunday; 19 September 2010	Pool events at Mohammed V Sports Complex in Casablanca Open Water events at Sidi Abbed beach in Temara
E v e n t s	200 fly (m); 200 IM (w); 100 back (m); 50 free (w); 1500 free (m); 4x100 Medley Relay (w)	200 fly (w); 50 free (m); 200 back (w); 200 IM (m); 1500 free (w); 4x100 Medley Relay (m)	[Open Water] 5K (m); 5K (w)	Pool events at Mohammed V Sports Complex in Casablanca Open Water events at Sidi Abbed beach in Temara

Preliminary heats began at 10:00 am; finals at 4:00 pm Open Water races began at 10:00 am

== Results ==
=== Men ===
Games	Gold		Silver		Bronze	
50m Free	David Dunford; Kenya	22.69	Jason Dunford; Kenya	22.83	Werner Bosman; South Africa	22.99
100m Free	Nabil Kebbab; Algeria	49.96	Jason Dunford; Kenya	50.39	David Dunford; Kenya	50.55
200m Free	Ahmed Mathlouthi; Tunisia	1:49.90; CR	Jay-Cee Thomson; South Africa	1:51.51	Mohamed Farhoud; Egypt	1:53.14
400m Free	Jay-Cee Thomson; South Africa	3:53.12; CR	Ahmed Mathlouthi; Tunisia	3:56.15	Devon Brown; South Africa	3:57.64
800m Free	Ahmed Mathlouthi; Tunisia	8:10.17	Mohamed Farhoud; Egypt	8:10.43	Devon Brown; South Africa	8:12.58
1500m Free						
50m Back	Darren Murray; South Africa	26.56	Garth Tune; South Africa	27.03	Mohamed Khaled Hussein; Egypt	27.09
100m Back	Darren Murray; South Africa	55.67; CR	Mohamed Khaled Hussein; Egypt	58.09	Taki Mrabet; Tunisia	58.53
200m Back	Darren Murray; South Africa	2:01.44	Taki Mrabet; Tunisia	2:04.93	Mohamed Khaled Hussein; Egypt	2:05.28
50m Breast	Nabil Kebbab; Algeria	28.93	Sofiane Daid; Algeria	29.16	William Diering; South Africa	29.26
100m Breast	Nabil Kebbab; Algeria	1:02.98	William Diering; South Africa	1:03.13	Sofiane Daid; Algeria	1:03.73
200m Breast	William Diering; South Africa	2:15.65; CR	Sofiane Daid; Algeria	2:16.53	Sherif Madkour; Egypt	2:19.25
50m Fly	Jason Dunford; Kenya	24.09	Neil Watson; South Africa	24.40	Garth Tune; South Africa	24.41
100m Fly	Jason Dunford; Kenya	52.66	Neil Watson; South Africa	53.80	Garth Tune; South Africa	54.35
200m Fly	Wesley Gilchrist; South Africa	2:00.72; CR	Marwan Osman; Egypt	2:04.08	Mostafa Atef Mostafa; Egypt	2:06.00
200m IM	Jay-Cee Thomson; South Africa	2:02.95; CR	Taki Mrabet; Tunisia	2:04.92	Wesley Gilchrist; South Africa	2:06.73
400m IM	Jay-Cee Thomson; South Africa	4:21.06; CR	Taki Mrabet; Tunisia	4:24.80	Devon Brown; South Africa	4:32.52
4x100m Free Relay	South Africa; Jay-Cee Thomson, Wesley Gilchrist, Neil Watson, Werner Bosman	3:23.99; CR	Algeria; Oussama Sahnoun, Ryad Djendouci, Badis Djendouci, Nabil Kebbab	3:24.04	Egypt; Ahmed Saaid Abdelrehim, Sheheb Younes, Adham Abdelmegid, Mohamed Khaled Hussein	3:27.40
4x200m Free Relay	South Africa; Daniel Marais, Jay-Cee Thomson, Devon Brown, Wesley Gilchrist	7:29.21; CR	Tunisia; Walid Naouar, Taki Mrabet, Tallel M'Rabet, Ahmed Mathlouthi	7:33.06	Algeria; Badis Djendouci, Mahrez Mebarek, Naoufel Benabid, Ryad Djendouci	7:34.65
4x100m Medley Relay	South Africa; Darren Murray, William Diering, Garth Tune, Neil Watson	3:43.53; CR	Algeria; Naoufel Benabid, Sofiane Daid, Ryad Djendouci, Nabil Kebbab	3:50.07	Egypt; Mohamed Khaled Hussein, Ahmed Kamal El Din, Marwan Osman, Sheheb Younes	3:50.87
5K; Open Water	Hadeil Mohamed; Egypt	40:50.36	Daniel Marais; Egypt	40:51.31	Abdul-Malick Railoun; South Africa	41:33.12

=== Women ===
Games	Gold		Silver		Bronze	
50m Free	Karin Prinsloo; South Africa	26.31	Farida Osman; Egypt	26.72	Chanelle van Wyk; South Africa	26.76
100m Free	Karin Prinsloo; South Africa	56.40	Leone Vorster; South Africa	57.50	Sara El Bekri; Morocco	58.30; NR
200m Free	Leone Vorster; South Africa	2:02.75	Rene Warnes; South Africa	2:04.95	Zaineb Khalfallah; Tunisia	2:05.09
400m Free	Leone Vorster; South Africa	4:18.86	Rene Warnes; South Africa	4:19.22	Shahd Mostafa; Egypt	4:25.88
800m Free	Kathryn Meaklim; South Africa	8:55.12	Rene Warnes; South Africa	8:57.42	Malya Mghezzi Bakhouche; Algeria	9:06.94
1500m Free						
50m Back	Chanelle van Wyk; South Africa	29.31	Jessica Ashley-Cooper; South Africa	29.90	Farida Osman; Egypt	31.19
100m Back	Chanelle van Wyk; South Africa	1:02.32; CR	Jessica Ashley-Cooper; South Africa	1:04.15	Engi El Shazli; Egypt	1:07.42
200m Back	Mandy Loots; South Africa	2:15.66; CR	Jessica Ashley-Cooper; South Africa	2:17.28	Sarra Lajnef; Tunisia	2:25.04
50m Breast	Sara El Bekri; Morocco	33.04	Sarra Lajnef; Tunisia	33.67	Ronwyn Roper; South Africa	33.79
100m Breast	Sara El Bekri; Morocco	1:10.82; CR	Sarra Lajnef; Tunisia	1:12.05	Kathryn Meaklim; South Africa	1:12.11
200m Breast	Sarra Lajnef; Tunisia	2:32.16; CR	Sara El Bekri; Morocco	2:32.43	Kathryn Meaklim; South Africa	2:32.77
50m Fly	Farida Osman; Egypt	27.28; CR	Vanessa Mohr; South Africa	27.29	Chanelle van Wyk; South Africa	27.59
100m Fly	Vanessa Mohr; South Africa	59.72; CR	Mandy Loots; South Africa	59.76	Farida Osman; Egypt	1:02.05
200m Fly	Mandy Loots; South Africa	2:11.97; CR	Bianca Meyer; South Africa	2:18.25	Nesrine Khelifati; Tunisia	2:18.69
200m IM	Mandy Loots; South Africa	2:16.77; CR	Sarra Lajnef; Tunisia	2:20.23	Bianca Meyer; South Africa	2:20.52
400m IM	Kathryn Meaklim; South Africa	4:45.76; CR	Sarra Lajnef; Tunisia	4:52.53	Bianca Meyer; South Africa	4:52.69
4x100m Free Relay	South Africa; Karin Prinsloo, Leone Vorster, Chanelle van Wyk, Mandy Loots	3:50.15; CR	Egypt; Farida Osman, Mei Atef Mostafa, Rowan Elbadry, Shahd Mostafa	3:58.02	Tunisia; Sarra Lajnef, Mariem Meddeb, Sendo Ayari, Zaineb Khalfallah	3:59.02
4x200m Free Relay	South Africa; Leone Vorster, Kathryn Meaklim, Jessica Ashley-Cooper, Rene Warnes	8:27.61; CR	Tunisia; Sendo Ayari, Sarra Lajnef, Maroua Mathlouthi, Zaineb Khalfallah	8:31.71	Algeria; Malya Mghezzi Bakhouche, Fella Bennaceur, Lydia Yefsah, Sarah Hadj Abderrahmane	8:41.58
4x100m Medley Relay	South Africa; Vanessa Mohr, Chanelle van Wyk, Kathryn Meaklim, Karin Prinsloo	4:09.53; CR	Morocco; Imane Boulaamane, Sara El Bekri, Shahrazad Ramond, Noufissa Chbihi	4:22.88	Egypt; Engi El Shazli, Mei Atef Mostafa, Farida Osman, Rowan Elbadry	4:23.38
5K; Open Water	Jessica Roux; South Africa	45:02.78	Sara El Bekri; Morocco	46:28.06	Malya Mgehezzi Bakhouche; Algeria	46:30.08

== Medal standings ==
Final medal standings for the 2010 African Swimming Championships are:

Rank	Nation	Gold	Silver	Bronze	Total
1	South Africa (RSA)	27	15	16	58
2	Tunisia (TUN)	3	10	4	17
3	Algeria (ALG)	3	4	6	13
4	Kenya (KEN)	3	2	1	6
5	Egypt (EGY)	2	6	12	20
6	Morocco (MAR)	2	3	1	6
Totals (6 entries)		40	40	40	120
