= Swimming at the 2007 Arab Games =

Swimming at the 2007 Pan Arab Games

The swimming competition at the 11th Arab Games was held November 12–18, 2007 in Cairo, Egypt. The competition featured 40 events (20 for males, 20 for females) swum in a long course (50 m) pool.

== Participating nations ==
Nations with swimmers at the 2007 Arab Games were:

- Algeria
- Bahrain
- Egypt
- Jordan
- Kuwait
- Libya
- Morocco
- Oman
- Palestine
- Qatar
- Saudi Arabia
- Syria
- Tunisia
- United Arab Emirates

== Event schedule ==
Prelims and finals held in all events, save the 800 and 1500 freestyles and the relays, with the male event preceding the female event.

12 November	13 November	14 November	15 November	16 November	17 November	18 November
100 fly 200 breast 800 free	50 free 200 back 400 I.M. 4x200 Free Relay	200 fly 50 breast 200 free	1500 free 200 IM; 4x100 Free Relay	50 back 100 breast 100 free	50 fly 100 back 400 free	4x100 Medley Relay

== Results ==
=== Men ===
Event	Gold		Silver		Bronze	
50 freestyle	Mohamed Mamdou Abdel Hamed; Egypt	22.36	Mohamad Ahmed Madwah; Kuwait	23.13	Nabil Kebbab; Algeria	23.20
100 freestyle	Nabil Kebbab; Algeria	50.91	Mohamad Ahmed Madwah; Kuwait	51.36	Mohamed Mamdou Abdel Hamed; Egypt	51.45
200 freestyle	Nabil Kebbab; Algeria	1:51.25	Badis Djendouci; Algeria	1:53.28	Hossin Medhat Abou Al Kasem; Egypt	1:53.94
400 freestyle	Ahmed Mathlouthi; Tunisia	4:00.10	Mohamed El Sayed Gad Allah; Egypt	4:00.70	Mohamed Maher Abdel Mougid; Egypt	4:00.83
800 freestyle	Ahmed Mathlouthi; Tunisia	8:15.52	Mohamed Mettiji; Tunisia; Naeim Mohamed Massri; Syria	8:23.92	not awarded	
1500 freestyle	Ahmed Mathlouthi; Tunisia	16:03.96	Mohamed El Sayed Gad Allah; Egypt	16:06.80	Naeim Mohmed Massri; Syria	16:26.74
50 backstroke	Ahmed Moustafa Hussein; Egypt	26.86	Mehdi Addadi; Algeria	27.38	Amine Kouame; Morocco	26.65; NR
100 backstroke	Ahmed Moustafa Hussein; Egypt	57.46	Taki Mrabet; Tunisia	59.11	Mehdi Addadi; Algeria	59.53
200 backstroke	Taki Mrabet; Tunisia	2:06.31	Naoufel Benabid; Algeria	2:10.08	Al Yousuf Yousuf Essa; Saudi Arabia	2:10.89
50 breaststroke	Sofiane Daid; Algeria	29.50	Amkudmani Ahmed Safwan; Saudi Arabia	29.52	Ayman Mohamed Khatab; Egypt	29.88
100 breaststroke	Sofiane Daid; Algeria	1:02.88	Wael Kobrously; Libya	1:05.65	Mehdi Hamama; Algeria	1:05.66
200 breaststroke	Sofiane Daid; Algeria	2:16.90	Sherif Ali Madkour; Egypt	2:22.78	Abdel Rhaman Fahd Albader; Kuwait	2:24.16
50 butterfly	Mohamed Mamdou Abdel Hamed; Egypt	25.05	Ahmed Salah Abdou; Egypt	25.07	Ryad Djendouci; Algeria	26.11
100 butterfly	Ahmed Salah Abdou; Egypt	54.48	Rami Aneis; Syria	56.98	Ryad Djendouci; Algeria	57.03
200 butterfly	Ahmed Salah Abdou; Egypt	2:03.44	Aghiles Slimani; Algeria	2:04.81	Ahmed Said Esaa; Egypt	2:05.92
200 I.M.	Taki Mrabet; Tunisia	2:10.04	Ahmed Mathlouthi; Tunisia	2:10.12	Mehdi Hamama; Algeria	2:12.05
400 I.M.	Ahmed Mathlouthi; Tunisia	4:31.06	Mehdi Hamama; Algeria	4:31.46	Mohamed El Sayed Gad Allah; Egypt	4:35.66
4×100; Free Relay	Algeria; Badis Djendouci, Ryad Djendouci, Mehdi Hamama, Nabil Kebbab	3:26.99	Egypt; Ahmed Yaser Al Kafrawy, Abdel Rahman Abu Bakr, Hossin Medhat Abou Al Kasem, Mohmed Mamdou Abdel Hamed	3:27.59	Kuwait; Mohamed Ahmed Madwah, Dawoud Mohamed Alkholeify, Marzouk Feisal Al Salem, Waled Jalil Al Kahtani	3:30.59
4×200; Free Relay	Algeria; Badis Djendouci, Mehrez Mebarek, Ryad Djendouci, Nabil Kebbab	7:37.41	Egypt; Abdel Rahman Abu Bakr, Adhm Ali Abdel Mougid, Hossin Medhat Abou Al Kasem, Mohamed Maher Abdel Mougid	7:40.23	Tunisia; Mohmed Mettiji, Ahmed Mathlouthi, Taki Mrabet, Abdelkhalek Skander	7:48.29
4×100; Medley Relay	Algeria; Naoufel Benabid, Sofiane Daid, Aghiles Slimani, Nabil Kebbab	3:46.76; NR	Egypt; Ahmed Moustafa Hussein, Ayman Mohamed Khatab, Ahmed Salah Abdou, Abdel Rahman Abu Bakr	3:48.65	Tunisia; Taki Mrabet, Ahmed Salah, Abdelkhalek Skander, Ahmed Mathlouthi	4:00.89

=== Women ===
Event	Gold		Silver		Bronze	
50 freestyle	Salma Abdel Raouf Zenhoum; Egypt	27.04	Sarra Chahed; Tunisia	27.16	Amina Magdy; Egypt	27.88
100 freestyle	Sarra Chahed; Tunisia	57.95	Sarah El Bekri; Morocco	59.96; NR	Hebatalla Yehya Abdel Rahman; Egypt	1:00.00
200 freestyle	Maroua Mathlouthi; Tunisia	2:04.14; NR	Sarra Chahed; Tunisia	2:07.52	Sarah El Bekri; Morocco	2:09.38; NR
400 freestyle	Maroua Mathlouthi; Tunisia	4:23.50	Sarah El Bekri; Morocco	4:29.37; NR	Malya Mghezzi Bakhouche; Algeria	4:31.80
800 freestyle	Maroua Mathlouthi; Tunisia	9:05.09	Malya Mghezzi Bakhouche; Algeria	9:21.08	Sara Magdy Al Basha; Egypt	9:39.99
1500 freestyle	Maroua Mathlouthi; Tunisia	18:22.86	Seham Ahmed Al Kerm; Egypt	18:27.77	Sara Magdy Al Basha; Egypt	18:41.80
50 backstroke	Dina Moustafa Hegazy; Egypt	31.29	Karima Lahmar; Algeria	31.96	Ingy Sameh; Egypt	32.23
100 backstroke	Dina Moustafa Hegazy; Egypt	1:06.17	Karima Lahmar; Algeria	1:08.05	Ingy Sameh; Egypt	1:08.16
200 backstroke	Dina Moustafa Hegazy; Egypt	2:24.66	Ingy Sameh; Egypt	2:27.71	Layla Amr Alghoul; Jordan	2:29.97
50 breaststroke	Salma Abdel Raouf Zenhoum; Egypt	33.35	Mériem Lamri; Algeria	33.74	Amira Rajaa Kouza; Algeria	34.00
100 breaststroke	Sara El Bekri; Morocco	1:12.01	Salma Abdel Raouf Zenhoum; Egypt	1:13.84	Mériem Lamri; Algeria	1:14.13
200 breaststroke	Sarah El Bekri; Morocco	2:33.61	Lydia Yefsah; Algeria	2:39.33	Salma Raouf Gasser; Egypt	2:41.11
50 butterfly	Farida Osman; Egypt	28.86	Mariem Meddeb; Tunisia	29.49	Razane Taha; Jordan	30.55
100 butterfly	Sarah Hadjabderahmane; Algeria	1:04.81	Mariem Meddeb; Tunisia	1:04.92	Amina Fatima Serir; Algeria	1:05.83
200 butterfly	Sarah Hadjabderahmane; Algeria	2:20.31	Mariem Meddeb; Tunisia	2:21.73	Amina Fatima Serir; Algeria; Marim Magdy; Egypt	2:27.58
200 I.M.	Maroua Mathlouthi; Tunisia	2:20.30	Sarra Lajnef; Tunisia	2:22.59	Salma Abdel Raouf Zenhoum; Egypt	2:25.61
400 I.M.	Maroua Mathlouthi; Tunisia	5:00.47	Sarra Lajnef; Tunisia	5:11.01	Seham Ahmed Al Kerm; Egypt	5:24.83
4×100; Free Relay	Tunisia; Zaineb Khlfallah, Maroua Mathlouthi, Sarra Lajnef, Sarra Chahed	3:56.76	Egypt; Salma Abdel Raouf Zenhoum, Hebatalla Yehya Abdel Rahman, Amina Magdy, Dina Moustafa Hegazy	3:57.69	Algeria; Fella Rym Hadjamer, Amina Fatima Serir, Malya Mghezzi Bakhouche, Amira Rajas Kouza	4:04.97
4×200; Free Relay	Tunisia; Sarra Chahed, Houda Al Moutaref, Sarra Lajnef, Marous Methlouthi	8:40.29	Egypt; Salma Abdel Raouf Zenhoum, Hebatalla Yehya Abdel Rahman, Dina Moustafa Hegazy, Amina Magdy	8:45.78	Algeria; Malya Mghezzi Bakhouche, Amira Rajaa Kouza, Smina Fatima Serir, Sarah Hadjabderahmane	8:46.89
4×100; Medley Relay	Tunisia; Sarra Chahed, Sarra Lajnef, Mariem Meddeb, Maroua Mathlouthi	4:26.50	Egypt; Dina Moustafa Hegazy, Salma Abdel Raouf Zenhoum, Farida Hesham, Hebatalla Yehya Abdel Rahman	4:28.05	Algeria; Karima Lahmar, Mériem Lamri, Sarah Hadjabderahmane, Amira Rajaa Kouza	4:29.61
