= 2008 African Swimming Championships =

The 9th African Swimming Championships were held at Ellis Park, Johannesburg, South Africa from 1–7 December 2008.

== Participants ==
Swimmers from 18 countries competed at the 2008 African Swimming Championships:

- Algeria
- Angola
- Côte d'Ivoire
- Egypt
- Guinea
- Kenya
- Mauritius
- Morocco
- Mozambique
- Namibia
- Nigeria
- Senegal
- South Africa
- Swaziland
- Tanzania
- Tunisia
- Uganda
- Zimbabwe

== Results ==
=== Medal standings ===
Rank	Nation	Gold	Silver	Bronze	Total
1	South Africa (RSA)	13	20	9	42
2	Tunisia (TUN)	13	7	11	31
3	Kenya (KEN)	5	3	2	10
4	Senegal (SEN)	2	0	4	6
5	Zimbabwe (ZIM)	0	1	3	4
6	Egypt (EGY)	0	1	0	1
6	Namibia (NAM)	0	1	0	1
8	Nigeria (NGR)	0	0	2	2
9	Angola (ANG)	0	0	1	1
9	Morocco (MAR)	0	0	1	1
Totals (10 entries)		33	33	33	99

=== Men's events ===
Event	Gold		Silver		Bronze	
50 m freestyle	Oussama Mellouli; Tunisia	23.26	Timothy Ferris; Zimbabwe	24.08	Yellow Yeiyah; Nigeria	24.15
100 m freestyle	Oussama Mellouli; Tunisia	49.81	Jason Dunford; Kenya	50.05	Farouk Ben Jeddi; Tunisia	53.23
200 m freestyle	Oussama Mellouli; Tunisia	1:50.28	Jason Dunford; Kenya	1:52.09	Riaan Schoeman; South Africa	1:52.76
400 m freestyle	Oussama Mellouli; Tunisia	3:58:17	Riaan Schoeman; South Africa	3:58.57	Ahmed Mathlouthi; Tunisia	4:06.22
800 m freestyle	Oussama Mellouli; Tunisia	8:20:73	Riaan Schoeman; South Africa	8:24.17	Ahmed Mathlouthi; Tunisia	8:26.09
1500 m freestyle	Oussama Mellouli; Tunisia	16:12.00	Chad Ho; South Africa	16:18.34	Ahmed Mathlouthi; Tunisia	17:34.47
50 m backstroke	Jason Dunford; Kenya	26.73	Darren Murray; South Africa	26.85	Oussama Mellouli; Tunisia	26.92
100 m backstroke	George du Rand; South Africa	55.92	Darren Murray; South Africa	57.89	Amine Kouam; Morocco	59.53
200 m backstroke	George du Rand; South Africa	2:01.02	Darren Murray; South Africa	2:06.08	Taki Mrabet; Tunisia	2:10.82
50 m breaststroke	Malick Fall; Senegal	28:38	Thabang Moeketsane; South Africa	29:15	Chad le Clos; South Africa	30:55
100 m breaststroke	Malick Fall; Senegal	1:02.71	William Diering; South Africa	1:02.72	Thabang Moeketsane; South Africa	1:04.30
200 m breaststroke	William Diering; South Africa	2:16:00	Oussama Mellouli; Tunisia	2:17.57	Chad le Clos; South Africa	2:24.20
50 m butterfly	Jason Dunford; Kenya	23.50	Garth Tune; South Africa	24.42	Yellow Yeiyah; Nigeria	25.27
100 m butterfly	Jason Dunford; Kenya	52.49	Garth Tune; South Africa	54.25	George du Rand; South Africa	54.65
200 m butterfly						
200 m individual medley	Oussama Mellouli; Tunisia	2:06.04	Chad le Clos; South Africa	2:06.76	Taki Mrabet; Tunisia	2:08.54
400 m individual medley	Oussama Mellouli; Tunisia	4:25.16	Riaan Schoeman; South Africa	4:27.40	Taki Mrabet; Tunisia	4:37.31
4 x 100 m freestyle relay	Tunisia; Farouk Ben Jeddi; Ahmed Mathlouthi; Taki Mbaret; Oussama Mellouli	3:29.79	South Africa; George du Rand; Pierre Wirth; Garth Tune; Riaan Schoeman	3:32.34	Senegal; Malick Fall; Matar Samb; Abdou Khadre Niane; Papa Madiop Ndong	3:42.24
4x200m freestyle relay						
4 x 100 m medley relay	South Africa; Darren Murray; Thabang Moeketsane; Garth Tune; George du Rand	3:48.46	Tunisia; Taki Mbaret; Oussama Mellouli; Farouk Ben Jeddi; Ahmed Mathlouthi	3:57.85	Angola; Matias João; Pedro Pinotes; Paulo Rebelo; Hélder Foretes	4:11.98
5 km open water	Chad Ho; South Africa	58.39	Aziz Mazen; South Africa	1:00.56	Abdul-Malick Railoun; South Africa	1:00.59

=== Women's events ===
Event	Gold		Silver		Bronze	
50 m freestyle	Sarra Chahed; Tunisia	26.79	Achieng Ajulu-Bushell; Kenya	26.88	Megan Scott; South Africa	27.24
100 m freestyle	Melissa Corfe; South Africa	58.10	Sarra Chahed; Tunisia	58:21	Achieng Ajulu-Bushell; Kenya	58:72
200 m freestyle	Zeineb Khalfallah; Tunisia	2:08.04	Dominique Dryding; South Africa	2:10.28	Moira Fraser; Zimbabwe	2:10.58
400m freestyle						
800m freestyle						
1500m freestyle						
50 m backstroke	Sarra Chahed; Tunisia	31:08	Rene Warnes; South Africa	31.58	Binta Zahra Diop; Senegal	32:44
100 m backstroke	Mandy Loots; South Africa	1:05.21	Jonay Briedenhann; Namibia	1:08.04	Kirsten Lapham; Zimbabwe	1:10.12
200m backstroke						
50 m breaststroke	Achieng Ajulu-Bushell; Kenya	32:64	Sarra Lajnef; Tunisia	34:07	Robyn Ferguson; South Africa	35:03
100 m breaststroke	Achieng Ajulu-Bushell; Kenya	1:12.88	Sarra Lajnef; Tunisia	1:13.30	Jessica Liss; South Africa	1:13.49
200 m breaststroke	Jessica Liss; South Africa	2:33.39	Sarra Lajnef; Tunisia	2:40.54	Maxine Heard; Zimbabwe	2:44.30
50 m butterfly	Mandy Loots; South Africa	27:66	Megan Scott; South Africa	28:63	Binta Zahra Diop; Senegal	28:66
100 m butterfly	Mandy Loots; South Africa	1:00.58	Megan Scott; South Africa	1:03.46	Mariem Meddeb; Tunisia	1:04.01
200m butterfly						
200 m individual medley	Mandy Loots; South Africa	2:18.91	Jessica Liss; South Africa	2:23.90	Sarra Lajnef; Tunisia	2:24.74
400m individual medley						
4 x 100 m freestyle relay	Tunisia; Zeineb Khalfallah; Sarra Lajnef; Mariem Meddeb; Sarra Chahed	3:58.45	South Africa; Megan Scott; Dominique Dryding; Robyn Ferguson; Mandy Loots	4:06.54	Kenya; Pina Ercolano; Sylvia Brunlehner; Rachita Shah; Achieng Ajulu-Bushell	4:16.33; NR
4x200m freestyle relay						
4 x 100 m medley relay	South Africa; Amanda Loots; Jessica Liss; Megan Scott; Dominique Dryding	4:23.65	Tunisia; Sarra Chahed; Sarra Lajnef; Mariem Meddeb; Zeineb Khalfallah	4:29.42	Senegal; Marieme Faye; Fatou Kine Diop; Binta Zahra Diop; Ouleye Diallo	4:46.37
5 km open water	Natalie du Toit; South Africa	1:04.01	Dominique Dryding; South Africa	1:06.43	Sarra Lajnef; Tunisia	1:10.08

== See also ==
- 2008 in swimming
