= 2006 African Swimming Championships =

The 8th African Swimming Championships were held in Dakar, Senegal from September 11 to September 16, 2006.

== Medal table ==
| Rank | Nation | Gold | Silver | Bronze | Total |
|---|---|---|---|---|---|
| 1 | South Africa (RSA) | 20 | 10 | 8 | 38 |
| 2 | Algeria (ALG) | 8 | 9 | 7 | 24 |
| 3 | Tunisia (TUN) | 5 | 10 | 5 | 20 |
| 4 | Kenya (KEN) | 4 | 4 | 1 | 9 |
| 5 | Egypt (EGY) | 2 | 4 | 9 | 15 |
| 6 | Seychelles (SEY) | 1 | 1 | 3 | 5 |
| 7 | Morocco (MAR) | 0 | 1 | 2 | 3 |
| 7 | Senegal (SEN) | 0 | 1 | 2 | 3 |
| 9 | Zimbabwe (ZIM) | 0 | 0 | 3 | 3 |
| Totals (9 entries) | | 40 | 40 | 40 | 120 |

== Medal summary ==
=== Men's events ===
| Event | Gold | | Silver | | Bronze | |
| 50 m freestyle | Salim Iles; Algeria | 22.65 | Shaun Harris; South Africa | 22.96 | Jason Dunford; Kenya | 23.31 |
| 100 m freestyle | Nabil Kebbab; Algeria | 50.57 | Jason Dunford; Kenya | 51.07 | Shaun Harris; South Africa | 51.29 |
| 200 m freestyle | Nabil Kebbab; Algeria | 1:52.05 | Jason Dunford; Kenya | 1:53.69 | John Ellis; South Africa | 1:54.65 |
| 400 m freestyle | Ahmed Mathlouthi; Tunisia | 3:58.75 | Mohamed Mettigi; Tunisia | 4:02.13 | Mohamed Magdy; Egypt | 4:02.92 |
| 800 m freestyle | Mohamed Magdy; Egypt | 8:21.12 | Mohamed Mettigi; Tunisia | 8:22.74 | Ahmed Mathlouthi; Tunisia | 8:24.00 |
| 1500 m freestyle | Chad Ho; South Africa | 15:52.52 | Mohamed Magdy; Egypt | 16:03.21 | Ahmed Mathlouthi; Tunisia | 16:07.11 |
| 50 m breaststroke | Thabang Moeketsane; South Africa | 28.95 | Malick Fall; Senegal | 29.47 | Mehdi Hamama; Algeria | 30.24 |
| 100 m breaststroke | Thabang Moeketsane; South Africa | 1:03.39 | Sofiane Daid; Algeria | 1:03.78 | Malick Fall; Senegal | 1:04.18 |
| 200 m breaststroke | Sofiane Daid; Algeria | 2:17.67 | Thabang Moeketsane; South Africa | 2:19.41 | Sherif Madkour; Egypt | 2:23.73 |
| 50 m butterfly | Salim Iles; Algeria | 24.75 | Jason Dunford; Kenya | 24.88 | Fouche Venter; South Africa | 25.17 |
| 100 m butterfly | Jason Dunford; Kenya | 53.88 | Ahmed Salah; Egypt | 55.00 | Fouche Venter; South Africa | 55.40 |
| 200 m butterfly | Ahmed Salah; Egypt | 2:02.95 | Sofiane Daid; Algeria | 2:03.64 | Mostafa Atef; Egypt | 2:05.60 |
| 50 m backstroke | Jason Dunford; Kenya | 26.83 | David Dunford; Kenya | 26.98 | Stuart Rogers; South Africa | 27.04 |
| 100 m backstroke | David Dunford; Kenya | 58.17 | Stuart Rogers; South Africa | 58.98 | Naoufel Benabid; Algeria | 59.26 |
| 200 m backstroke | David Dunford; Kenya | 2:06.48 | Stuart Rogers; South Africa | 2:06.74 | Naoufel Benabid; Algeria | 2:06.93 |
| 200 m individual medley | Taki Mrabet; Tunisia | 2:06.84 | Ahmed Mathlouthi; Tunisia | 2:06.99 | Mehdi Hamama; Algeria | 2:07.14 |
| 400 m individual medley | Stuart Rogers; South Africa | 4:31.48 | Taki Mrabet; Tunisia | 4:33.54 | Mohamed Gadallah; Egypt | 4:34.81 |
| 4 × 100 m freestyle relay | Algeria (50.83) Nabil Kebbab (53.99) Badis Djendouci (53.05) Naoufel Benabid (50.28) Salim Iles | 3:28.15 | South Africa (51.35) Shaun Harris (53.36) Ryan De Klerk (52.65) Stuart Rogers (51.11) Fouche Venter | 3:28.47 | Egypt (52.29) Mohamed Mamdouh (53.82) Ahmed Salah (54.08) Ahmed Mustafa (51.62) Abdel Rahman A. Bakr | 3:31.81 |
| 4 × 200 m freestyle relay | Algeria (1:57.27) Medhi Hamama (1:55.91) Ryad Djendouci (1:59.17) Naoufel Benabid (1:52.97) Nabil Kebbab | 7:45.32 | Tunisia (1:59.96) Mohamed Mettigi (1:56.81) Anouar Bennaceur (1:56.98) Taki Mrabet (1:56.72) Ahmed Mathlouthi | 7:50.47 | Egypt (1:58.18) Mohamed Magdy (1:58.12) Aziz Mazen (1:59.01) Mohammed Gad Allah (1:57.88) Abdel Rahman A. Bakr | 7:53.19 |
| 4 × 100 m medley relay | South Africa (58.95) Stuart Rogers (1:02.47) Thabang Moeketsane (54.72) Fouche Venter (50.38) Shaun Harris | 3:46.52 | Algeria (58.93) Naoufel Benabid (1:02.53) Sofiane Daid (57.24) Nabil Kebbab (50.42) Salim Iles | 3:49.12 | Egypt (1:00.76) Mohamed Tarek Salah (1:05.71) Ayman Khatab (54.80) Ahmed Salah (52.07) Abdel Rahman A. Bakr | 3:53.34 |

=== Women's events ===
| Event | Gold | | Silver | | Bronze | |
| 50 m freestyle | Sarra Chahed; Tunisia | 27:13 | Marielle Rogers; South Africa | 27:44 | Samantha Richter; Zimbabwe | 27:56 |
| 100 m freestyle | Leone Vorster; South Africa | 57:67 | Sarra Chahed; Tunisia | 58:01 | Samantha Richter; Zimbabwe | 59:44 |
| 200 m freestyle | Leone Vorster; South Africa | 2:01.92 | Maroua Mathlouthi; Tunisia | 2:06.81 | Shrone Austin; Seychelles | 2:07.60 |
| 400 m freestyle | Leone Vorster; South Africa | 4:17.44 | Natalie du Toit; South Africa | 4:24.83 | Shrone Austin; Seychelles | 4:26.21 |
| 800 m freestyle | Maroua Mathlouthi; Tunisia | 8:57.69 | Shrone Austin; Seychelles | 9:04.09 | Natalie du Toit; South Africa | 9:12.21 |
| 1500 m freestyle | Shrone Austin; Seychelles | 17:07.28 | Maroua Mathlouthi; Tunisia | 17:27.32 | Natalie du Toit; South Africa | 17:49.42 |
| 50 m breaststroke | Tamaryn Laubscher; South Africa | 33:33 | Meriem Lamri; Algeria | 34:02 | Sara El Bekri; Morocco | 34:05 |
| 100 m breaststroke | Tamaryn Laubscher; South Africa | 1:11.84 | Meriem Lamri; Algeria | 1:12.95 | Sara El Bekri; Morocco | 1:14.17 |
| 200 m breaststroke | Tamaryn Laubscher; South Africa | 2:32.64 | Sara El Bekri; Morocco | 2:37.97 | Lydia Yefsah; Algeria | 2:38.93 |
| 50 m butterfly | Elzanne Werth; South Africa | 28:57 | Leone Vorster; South Africa | 28:65 | Samantha Richter; Zimbabwe | 29:13 |
| 100 m butterfly | Elzanne Werth; South Africa | 1:02.57 | Fella Bennaceur; Algeria | 1:03.41 | Mariem Meddeb; Tunisia | 1:04.42 |
| 200 m butterfly | Sarah Hadjabderahmane; Algeria | 2:16.72 | Louise Smyth; South Africa | 2:19.26 | Mariem Meddeb; Tunisia | 2:24.06 |
| 50 m backstroke | Lehesta Kemp; South Africa | 30.96 | Dina Hegazy; Egypt | 31:22 | Khadija Ciss; Senegal | 31:44 |
| 100 m backstroke | Lehesta Kemp; South Africa | 1:04.93 | Dina Hegazy; Egypt | 1:05.51 | Karima Lahmar; Algeria | 1:07.24 |
| 200 m backstroke | Lehesta Kemp; South Africa | 2:20.99 | Tanya Bouffe; South Africa | 2:22.03 | Dina Hegazy; Egypt | 2:23.07 |
| 200 m individual medley | Tamaryn Laubscher; South Africa | 2:21.76 | Maroua Mathlouthi; Tunisia | 2:22.85 | Tanya Bouffe; South Africa | 2:23.91 |
| 400 m individual medley | Maroua Mathlouthi; Tunisia | 4:55.58 | Souad Nafisa Cherouati; Algeria | 5:03.50 | Shrone Austin; Seychelles | 5:09.15 |
| 4 × 100 m freestyle relay | South Africa (59.68) Elzanne Werth (59.28) Tamaryn Laubscher (59.56) Lehesta Kemp (57.33) Leone Vorster | 3:55.85 | Tunisia (58.05) Sarra Chahed (59.92) Nadia Chahed (1:00.81) Mariem Meddeb (59.79) Maroua Mathlouthi | 3:58.17 | Algeria (1:00.18) Fella Bennaceur (1:01.40) Souad Nafisa Cherouati (1:01.76) Sarah Hadjabderahmane (1:00.06) Kenza Matoub | 4:03.40 |
| 4 × 200 m freestyle relay | South Africa (2:05.76) Leone Vorster (2:07.27) Elzanne Werth (2:12.98) Louise Smyth (2:10.19) Tamaryn Laubscher | 8:36.20 | Algeria (2:08.21) Kenza Matoub (2:10.79) Fella Bennaceur (2:11.50) Souad Nafisa Cherouati (2:10.10) Sarah Hadjabderahmane | 8:40.60; NR | Tunisia (2:10.48) Sarra Chahed (2:13.61) Raoudha Rebai (2:14.98) Mariem Meddeb (2:06.76) Maroua Mathlouthi | 8:45.86 |
| 4 × 100 m medley relay | South Africa (1:05.69) Lehesta Kemp (1:11.32) Tamaryn Laubscher (1:03.75) Elzanne Werth (57.98) Leone Vorster | 4:18.74 | Algeria (1:08.16) Karima Lahmar (1:14.95) Mériem Lamri (1:05.27) Sarah Hadjabderahmane (58.71) Fella Bennaceur | 4:27.09 | Egypt (1:06.62) Dina Hegazy (1:16.87) Salma Raouf Gasser (1:06.47) May Attef (1:00.22) Heba Yehia | 4:30.18 |
