= 2012 African Swimming Championships =

International swimming competition

11th African Swimming Championships
- Host city: Nairobi, Kenya
- Date: September 10–15, 2012
- Venue(s): Moi Aquatics Complex, Kasarani
- Nations: 16
- Athletes: ?
- Events: 40

The 11th African Swimming Championships were held September 10–15, 2012 in Nairobi, Kenya.

Competition location was the Moi Aquatics Complex in Kasarani.

== Participating countries ==
Countries which sent teams were:

- Algeria
- Angola
- Benin
- Botswana
- Egypt
- Ghana
- Kenya
- Mauritius
- Namibia
- Nigeria
- Rwanda
- Senegal
- Seychelles
- South Africa
- Tunisia
- Uganda

== Results ==
=== Men ===
Games	Gold		Silver		Bronze	
50m Free	Jason Dunford; Kenya	23.01	Oussama Sahnoune; Algeria	23.11	Abdelmegid Mohamed; Egypt	23.42
100m Free	Myles Brown; South Africa	51.06	Jason Dunford; Kenya	51.20	Oussama Sahnoune; Algeria	51.60
200m Free	Myles Brown; South Africa	1'52.10	Ahmed Mathlouthi; Tunisia	1'53.19	Jason Dunford; Kenya	1'54.79
400m Free	Myles Brown; South Africa	3'57.59	Ahmed Mathlouthi; Tunisia	4'05.74	Lyes Nefsi; Algeria	4'08.36
800m Free	Myles Brown; South Africa	8'20.32	Ahmed Mathlouthi; Tunisia	8'31.81	Ali Ahmed Marwan; Egypt	8'32.89
1500m Free	Myles Brown; South Africa	16'04.69	Ali Ahmed Marwan; Egypt	16'25.48	Pedro Pinotes; Angola	16'45.60
50m Back	Ricky Ellis; South Africa	26.74	Jason Dunford; Kenya	27.18	Ryad Djendouci; Algeria	27.20
100m Back	Ricky Ellis; South Africa	57.75	Taki Mrabet; Tunisia	58.76	Michael Meyer; South Africa	59.42
200m Back	Taki Mrabet; Tunisia	2'06.65	Myles Brown; South Africa	2'07.19	Ricky Ellis; South Africa	2'08.52
50m Breast	Malick Fall; Senegal	28.57	Wasim Ellouni; Tunisia	28.80	Talel Mrabet; Tunisia	29.16
100m Breast	Wasim Ellouni; Tunisia	1'04.01	Malick Fall; Senegal	1'04.52	Michael Meyer; South Africa	1'04.87
200m Breast	Taki Mrabet; Tunisia	2'20.89	Talel Mrabet; Tunisia	2'21.35	Ahmed El Din Kamal; Egypt	2'21.59
50m Fly	Jason Dunford; Kenya	24.05	Oussama Sahnoune; Algeria	25.49	Joao Matias; Angola	25.59
100m Fly	Jason Dunford; Kenya	53.16	Marawan Osman; Egypt	55.47	Oussama Sahnoune; Algeria	55.79
200m Fly	Ahmed Akram Abbas; Egypt	2'04.92	Marawan Osman; Egypt	2'05.35	Myles Brown; South Africa	2'05.45
200m IM	Taki Mrabet; Tunisia	2'05.11	Michael Meyer; South Africa	2'06.32	Ayrton Sweeney; South Africa	2'06.74
400m IM	Ayrton Sweeney; South Africa	4'27.60	Taki Mrabet; Tunisia	4'28.22	Gadalla El Sayed; Egypt	4'32.77
4x100m Free Relay	South Africa	3'30.52	Egypt	3'31.09	Algeria	3'31.45
4x200m Free Relay	South Africa	7'42.68	Egypt	7'44.80	Tunisia	7'48.06
4x100m Medley Relay	Egypt	3'51.29	Tunisia	3'53.49	South Africa	3'53.66

=== Women ===
Games	Gold		Silver		Bronze	
50m Free	Lehesta Kemp; South Africa	26.08	Mai Atef Abdelfatta; Egypt	27.24	Hossam Rowan; Egypt	27.35
100m Free	Lehesta Kemp; South Africa	57.98	Kyna Pereira (South Africa) South AFrica	58.32	Zeineb Khalfalla; Tunisia	58.83
200m Free	Michelle Weber; South Africa	2:03.80	Kyna Pereira; South Africa	2:04.24	Zeineb Khalfalla; Tunisia	2:06.89
400m Free	Michelle Weber; South Africa	4:19.60	Reem Kaseem; Egypt	4:26.55	Rene Warnes; South Africa	4:28.25
800m Free	Michelle Weber; South Africa	8:50.45 CR	Kyna Pereira; South Africa	9:05.77	Reem Kaseem; Egypt	9:16.70
1500m Free	Michelle Weber; South Africa	16:46.46 CR	Kyna Pereira; South Africa	17:14.24	Reem Kaseem; Egypt	17:28.34
50m Back	Lehesta Kemp; South Africa	30.67	Nathania Van Niekerk; South Africa	30.69	Asma Sammod; Tunisia	31.06
100m Back	Lehesta Kemp; South Africa	1:03.68	Nathania Van Niekerk; South Africa	1:04.96	Marym Rahman El Sayed; Egypt	1:06.98
200m Back	Nathania Van Niekerk; South Africa	2:20.30	Rene Warnes; South Africa	2:21.99	Hania Hany; Egypt	2:22.35
50m Breast	Tara Nicholas; South Africa	33.15	Mai Atef Abdelfatta; Egypt	33.56	Rowida Mohamed; Egypt	34.39
100m Breast	Tara Nicholas; South Africa	1:12.47	Mai Atef Abdelfatta; Egypt	1:13.26	Rowida Mohamed; Egypt	1:14.99
200m Breast	Rowida Mohamed; Egypt	2:37.41	Mai Atef Abdelfatta; Egypt	2:38.75	Tara Nicholas; South Africa	2:39.98
50m Fly	Mandy Loots; South Africa	27.75	Lehesta Kemp; South Africa	28.44	Fella Bennaceur; Algeria	28.97
100m Fly	Mandy Loots; South Africa	1:00.64	Rene Warnes; South Africa	1:03.40	Fella Bennaceur; Algeria	1:04.39
200m Fly	Mandy Loots; South Africa	2:15.85	Michelle Weber; South Africa	2:20.41	Marym Rahman El Sayed; Egypt	2:21.30
200m IM	Mandy Loots; South Africa	2:20.55	Rene Warnes; South Africa	2:22.60	Rowida Mohamed; Egypt	2:26.05
400m IM	Rene Warnes; South Africa	4:59.82	Mandy Loots; South Africa	5:04.28	Rowida Mohamed; Egypt	5:09.63
4x100m freestyle relay	South Africa; Kyna Pereira; Michelle Weber; Rene Warnes; Lehesta Kemp	3:55.54	Egypt; Hossam Rowan; Reem Kaseem; Hania Hany; Mai Atef Abdelfatta	4:01.38	Algeria; Fella Bennaceur; Amel Melih; Amel Lalla; Nesrine Khelifati	4:02.67
4x200m freestyle relay	South Africa; Kyna Pereira; Michelle Weber; Rene Warnes; Lehesta Kemp	8:39.57	Egypt; Hossam Rowan; Reem Kaseem; Hania Hany; Shahd Osman	8:53.64	Algeria; Amel Melih; Fella Bennaceur; Souad Cherouati; Nesrine Khelifati	9:06.66
4x100m medley relay	South Africa; Nathania van Niekerk; Tara Nicholas; Mandy Loots; Lehesta Kemp	4:18.31	Egypt; Hania Hany; Mai Atef Abdelfatta; Marym Rahman El Sayed; Hossam Rowan	4:29.08	Algeria; Amel Melih; Nesrine Khelifati; Fella Bennaceur; Amel Lalla	4:34.61

== Medal standings ==
Final medal standings for the 2012 African Swimming Championships are:

Rank	Nation	Gold	Silver	Bronze	Total
1	South Africa (RSA)	29	14	8	51
2	Tunisia (TUN)	4	8	5	17
3	Egypt (EGY)	3	13	14	30
4	Kenya (KEN)	3	2	1	6
5	Senegal (SEN)	1	1	0	2
6	Algeria (ALG)	0	2	10	12
7	Angola (ANG)	0	0	2	2
Totals (7 entries)		40	40	40	120
