= List of Nigerian records in swimming =

Nigerian records in swimming

The Nigerian Records in Swimming are the fastest times ever swum by a swimmer representing Nigeria. These records are kept/maintained by the Nigeria Aquatics Federation (NAqF).

Records are recognized for the following long course (50m) events:

- freestyle: 50, 100, 200, 400, 800 and 1500;
- backstroke: 50, 100 and 200;
- breaststroke: 50, 100 and 200;
- butterfly: 50, 100 and 200;
- individual medley (I.M.): 100, 200 and 400;
- relays: 4x100 free, 4x200 free, and 4 × 100 medley.

All records were set in finals unless noted otherwise.

== Long Course (50m) ==
=== Men ===
Event	Time		Name	Club	Date	Meet	Location	Ref
50 m freestyle	22.21	h	Abduljabar Adama	Nigeria	21 August 2025	World Junior Championships	Otopeni, Romania	
100 m freestyle	49.98	h	Abduljabar Adama	Mount Kelly	16 April 2026	British Championships	London, United Kingdom	
200 m freestyle	1:55.95		Philip Adejumo	Nashville Aquatic Club	19 July 2019	SE Southeastern Championships	Huntsville, United States	
400 m freestyle	4:28.38		Samson Opuakpo	Nigeria	8 September 2011	All-Africa Games	Maputo, Mozambique	
800 m freestyle	9:40.42		Samson Opuakpo	Delta State	April 2006	Nigeria Sports Festival	Abeokuta, Nigeria	
1500 m freestyle	18:31.55		Yimisi Yolomi	-	1989	-		
50 m backstroke	27.58		Samson Opuakpo	Nigeria	5 September 2011	All-Africa Games	Maputo, Mozambique	
100 m backstroke	1:01.10	h	Abduljabar Adama	Mt Kelly	24 July 2023	British Summer Championships	Sheffield, Great Britain	
200 m backstroke	2:22.70		Samson Opuakpo	Nigeria	July 2007	African Games	Algiers, Algeria	
50 m breaststroke	28.89	h	Tobi Sijuade	Nigeria	12 March 2024	African Games	Accra, Ghana	
100 m breaststroke	1:06.63	h	Adeope Oluwatobiloba	Nigeria	10 March 2024	African Games	Accra, Ghana	
200 m breaststroke	2:33.09		Eric Williams	Nigeria	September 2006	African Championships	Dakar, Senegal	
50 m butterfly	23.32	sf, so	Abduljabar Adama	Nigeria	28 July 2026	Commonwealth Games	Glasgow, United Kingdom	
100 m butterfly	52.81	h	Abduljabar Adama	Mount Kelly	17 April 2026	British Championships	London, United Kingdom	
200 m butterfly	2:09.43		Clinton Opute	Nigeria	9 March 2024	African Games	Accra, Ghana	
200 m individual medley	2:15.40	h	Clinton Opute	Nigeria	24 July 2026	Commonwealth Games	Glasgow, United Kingdom	
400 m individual medley	5:06.01		Samson Opuakpo	Nigeria	July 2007	African Games	Algiers, Algeria	
4×100 m freestyle relay	3:26.01		Abduljabar Adama (52.28); Clinton Opute (51.23); Tobi Sijuade (51.10); Colins Ebingha (51.40)	Nigeria	12 March 2024	African Games	Accra, Ghana	
4×200 m freestyle relay	8:18.09		Tebesa Nemine; Samson Opuakpo; Oluseyi Fatayi Williams; Otiko Kpiliboh	Nigeria	13 July 2007	African Games	Algiers, Algeria	
4×100 m medley relay	4:04.41		Olufolahon Oluwole; Eric Williams; Musa Bakare; Gentle Offoin	Nigeria	October 2003	African Games	Abuja, Nigeria	

Legend: # – Record awaiting ratification by Nigeria Swimming Federation; WR – World record; AF – African record;
Records not set in finals: h – heat; sf – semifinal; r – relay 1st leg; rh – relay heat 1st leg; b – B final; † – en route to final mark; so – swim-off; tt – time trial

=== Women ===
Event	Time		Name	Club	Date	Meet	Location	Ref
50 m freestyle	27.14	h	Adaku Nwandu	Nigeria	8 September 2023	World Junior Championships	Netanya, Israel	
100 m freestyle	59.74	h	Abiola Ogunbanwo	Nigeria	28 July 2021	Olympic Games	Tokyo, Japan	
200 m freestyle	2:15.44	h	Abiola Ogunbanwo	Nigeria	23 July 2019	World Championships	Gwangju, South Korea	
400 m freestyle	4:59.90		Ifiezibe Gagbe	Nigeria	13 July 2007	African Games	Algiers, Algeria	
800 m freestyle	10:45.50		R. Fibgele	-	1981	-		
1500 m freestyle			-		-			
50 m backstroke	31.06		Obia Inyengiyikabo	Nigeria	October 2003	African Games	Abuja, Nigeria	
100 m backstroke	1:07.78		Obia Inyengiyikabo	Nigeria	October 2003	African Games	Abuja, Nigeria	
200 m backstroke	2:43.64		Obia Inyengiyikabo	Rivers	1992			
50 m breaststroke	33.81		Racheal Tonjor	Nigeria	7 September 2011	African Games	Maputo, Mozambique	
100 m breaststroke	1:15.49		Racheal Tonjor	Nigeria	7 September 2011	African Games	Maputo, Mozambique	
200 m breaststroke	2:51.93		Blessing Forcados	Nigeria	13 July 2007	African Games	Algiers, Algeria	
50 m butterfly	28.21	h	Timipame-ere Akiayefa	Nigeria	1 August 2025	World Championships	Singapore, Singapore	
100 m butterfly	1:05.24	h	Adaku Nwandu	Nigeria	8 September 2023	World Junior Championships	Netanya, Israel	
200 m butterfly	2:41.76		Ikhaghomi Joshua	-	1992	-		
200 m individual medley	2:39.49		Ikhaghomi Joshua	Rivers	1992	-		
400 m individual medley	5:57.87		D. Edema	-	1991	-		
4×100 m freestyle relay	4:15.43			Nigeria	1991	-		
4×200 m freestyle relay	10:20.18			Nigeria	1987	-		
4×100 m medley relay	4:46.26			Nigeria	1991	-		

Legend: # – Record awaiting ratification by Nigeria Swimming Federation; WR – World record; AF – African record;
Records not set in finals: h – heat; sf – semifinal; r – relay 1st leg; rh – relay heat 1st leg; b – B final; † – en route to final mark; so – swim-off; tt – time trial

=== Mixed relay ===
Event	Time		Name	Club	Date	Meet	Location	Ref
4×100 m freestyle relay	3:48.83	h	Clinton Opute (52.71); Colins Obi Ebingha (51.52); Dorcas Abeng (1:02.21); Adaku Nwandu (1:02.39)	Nigeria	29 July 2023	World Championships	Fukuoka, Japan	
4×100 m medley relay	4:24.61		Samson Opuakpo (1:02.39); Racheal Tonjor (1:22.32); Ifeakachukwu Nmor (57.16); Ifiezibe Gagbe (1:02.74)	Nigeria	10 September 2015	All-Africa Games	Brazzaville, Congo	

Legend: # – Record awaiting ratification by Nigeria Swimming Federation; WR – World record; AF – African record;
Records not set in finals: h – heat; so – swim-off

== Short Course (25m) ==
=== Men ===
Event	Time		Name	Club	Date	Meet	Location	Ref
50 m freestyle	21.44		Abduljabar Adama	Mount Kelly	13 December 2025	Swim England National Winter Championships	Sheffield, United Kingdom	
100 m freestyle	48.35	b	Abduljabar Adama	Mount Kelly	14 December 2025	Swim England National Winter Championships	Sheffield, United Kingdom	
200 m freestyle	1:58.54	h	Leon Osayi Owie	SG Siegen	2 November 2019	NRW Championships	Wuppertal, Germany	
400 m freestyle	4:15.84	h	Clinton Opute	Nigeria	19 December 2024	Vladimir Salnikov Cup	Saint Petersburg, Russia	
800 m freestyle	9:10.37		Leon Osayi Owie	SG Siegen	26 October 2019	49. Internationaler Tag der langen Strecken	Siegen, Germany	
1500 m freestyle	17:47.79		Leon Osayi Owie	SG Siegen	26 October 2019	49. Internationaler Tag der langen Strecken	Siegen, Germany	
50 m backstroke	26.17	h	Samson Opuakpo	Nigeria	14 December 2012	World Championships	Istanbul, Turkey	
100 m backstroke	59.17	h	Samson Opuakpo	Nigeria	12 December 2012	World Championships	Istanbul, Turkey	
200 m backstroke	2:37.85		Clinton Opute	Nigeria	25 November 2022	Russian Championships	Russia	
50 m breaststroke	29.33		Abduljabar Adama	Mount Kelly	5 October 2024	1st Chance Qualifier SC L2 Meet	Portsmouth, United Kingdom	
100 m breaststroke	1:11.13	h	Forsight Osamezu	Nigeria	3 December 2014	World Championships	Doha, Qatar	
200 m breaststroke								
50 m butterfly	22.82		Abduljabar Adama	Mount Kelly	11 December 2025	Swim England National Winter Championships	Sheffield, United Kingdom	
100 m butterfly	51.38		Abduljabar Adama	Mount Kelly	13 December 2025	Swim England National Winter Championships	Sheffield, United Kingdom	
200 m butterfly	2:20.20	h	Sunday Price Ayejon	Nigeria	13 April 2008	World Championships	Manchester, United Kingdom	
100 m individual medley	58.32		Abduljabar Adama	Mount Kelly	5 October 2024	1st Chance Qualifier SC L2 Meet	Portsmouth, United Kingdom	
200 m individual medley	2:17.52	h	Clinton Opute	Nigeria	21 December 2024	Vladimir Salnikov Cup	Saint Petersburg, Russia	
400 m individual medley	5:01.59		Leon Osayi Owie	SG Siegen	26 October 2019	49. Internationaler Tag der langen Strecken	Siegen, Germany	
4×50 m freestyle relay								
4×100 m freestyle relay								
4×200 m freestyle relay								
4×50 m medley relay								
4×100 m medley relay								

Legend: # – Record awaiting ratification by Nigeria Swimming Federation; WR – World record; AF – African record;
Records not set in finals: h – heat; sf – semifinal; r – relay 1st leg; rh – relay heat 1st leg; b – B final; † – en route to final mark; so – swim-off; tt – time trial

=== Women ===
Event	Time		Name	Club	Date	Meet	Location	Ref
50 m freestyle	26.94	h	Ngozi Monu	Nigeria	12 April 2008	Short Course Worlds	Manchester, United Kingdom	
100 m freestyle	59.95		Ngozi Monu	-	2008			
200 m freestyle	2:13.83	h	Ngozi Monu	Nigeria	13 April 2008	Short Course Worlds	Manchester, United Kingdom	
400 m freestyle								
800 m freestyle								
1500 m freestyle								
50 m backstroke	35.47	h	Uche Monu	Nigeria	12 April 2008	Short Course Worlds	Manchester, United Kingdom	
100 m backstroke	1:14.83	h	Uche Monu	Nigeria	9 April 2008	Short Course Worlds	Manchester, United Kingdom	
200 m backstroke								
50 m breaststroke	35.35	h	Rachael Tonjor	Nigeria	12 December 2012	World Championships	Istanbul, Turkey	
100 m breaststroke	1:17.95	h	Rachael Tonjor	Nigeria	5 December 2014	World Championships	Doha, Qatar	
200 m breaststroke								
50 m butterfly	31.02	h	Faith Edorodoin	Nigeria	13 December 2012	World Championships	Istanbul, Turkey	
100 m butterfly	1:09.60	h	Faith Edorodoin	Nigeria	15 December 2012	World Championships	Istanbul, Turkey	
200 m butterfly								
100 m individual medley	1:15.60	h	Rachael Tonjor	Nigeria	16 December 2010	World Championships	Dubai, United Arab Emirates	
200 m individual medley								
400 m individual medley								
4×50 m freestyle relay								
4×100 m freestyle relay								
4×200 m freestyle relay								
4×50 m medley relay								
4×100 m medley relay								

Legend: # – Record awaiting ratification by Nigeria Swimming Federation; WR – World record; AF – African record;
Records not set in finals: h – heat; sf – semifinal; r – relay 1st leg; rh – relay heat 1st leg; b – B final; † – en route to final mark; so – swim-off; tt – time trial
