= Melissa Corfe =

South African swimmer (born 1986)

Personal information
- Full name: Melissa Jane Corfe
- National team: South Africa
- Born: 20 January 1986 (age 40) Durban, South Africa
- Height: 1.75 m (5 ft 9 in)
- Weight: 61 kg (134 lb)

Sport
- Sport: Swimming
- Strokes: Freestyle, backstroke
- Club: Mr. Price Seagulls S.C.
Medal record
Women's swimming
Representing South Africa
All-Africa Games
Gold medal – first place	2007 Algiers	100 m freestyle
Gold medal – first place	2007 Algiers	200 m freestyle
Gold medal – first place	2007 Algiers	400 m freestyle
Silver medal – second place	2007 Algiers	100 m backstroke
Silver medal – second place	2007 Algiers	200 m backstroke

Melissa Jane Corfe (born 20 January 1986) is a South African swimmer, who specialised in freestyle and backstroke events. She is a multiple-time South African champion and record holder for her respective events. Corfe represented her nation South Africa at the 2008 Summer Olympics, and has won a total of five medals, including three golds in the women's freestyle (100, 200, and 400 m), at the 2007 All-Africa Games in Algiers, Algeria. She also set two national records (both long and short course), as a member of the South African swimming team, in the freestyle and medley relays, at the 2008 FINA World Short Course Championships in Manchester, England.

== 2008 Summer Olympics ==
Corfe competed for South Africa in five swimming events at the 2008 Summer Olympics in Beijing. She crushed three national records and cleared FINA A-standards each in the 200 m freestyle (1:59.76), 400 m freestyle (4:08.70), and 200 m backstroke (2:10.03) at the South African Championships four months earlier in Johannesburg to assure her selection to the nation's Olympic swimming team.

On the first night of the Games, Corfe teamed up with Wendy Trott, Mandy Loots, and Katheryn Meaklim in the 4 × 100 m freestyle relay. Swimming the lead-off leg in heat two, Corfe recorded a fastest split of 55.93 seconds, but the South African foursome had to settle for last place out of fifteen registered nations with a total time of 3:51.14. The following night, in the 400 m freestyle, Corfe headed into the 750-metre turn with a marvelous fourth-place swim in the last of six heats, but faded down the stretch on a sprint challenge to pick up the sixth spot and seventeenth overall in 4:10.54.

On the third night of the prelims, Corfe failed to break a two-minute barrier in the 200 m freestyle. She lost in a close race against fourth-place finalist Paulina Barzycka of Poland by three hundredths of a second (0.03), dropping to sixth place and thirty-third overall in 2:00.95. In her third and final individual event, 200 m backstroke, Corfe cruised to seventh place in heat four with a 2:12.64, just six seconds behind the defending Olympic champion Kirsty Coventry of the neighbouring Zimbabwe, sharing a twenty-second place tie with Ukraine's Kateryna Zubkova in the prelims.

On the last day of the preliminaries, Corfe reunited her South African teammates Loots, Suzaan van Biljon, and Lize-Mari Retief in the 4 × 100 m medley relay. Swimming the backstroke leg, Corfe posted a split of 1:02.62 to give the South African foursome a twelfth-place overall finish in the prelims with a total time of 4:04.20.
