= Jason Dunford =

Kenyan swimmer (born 1986)

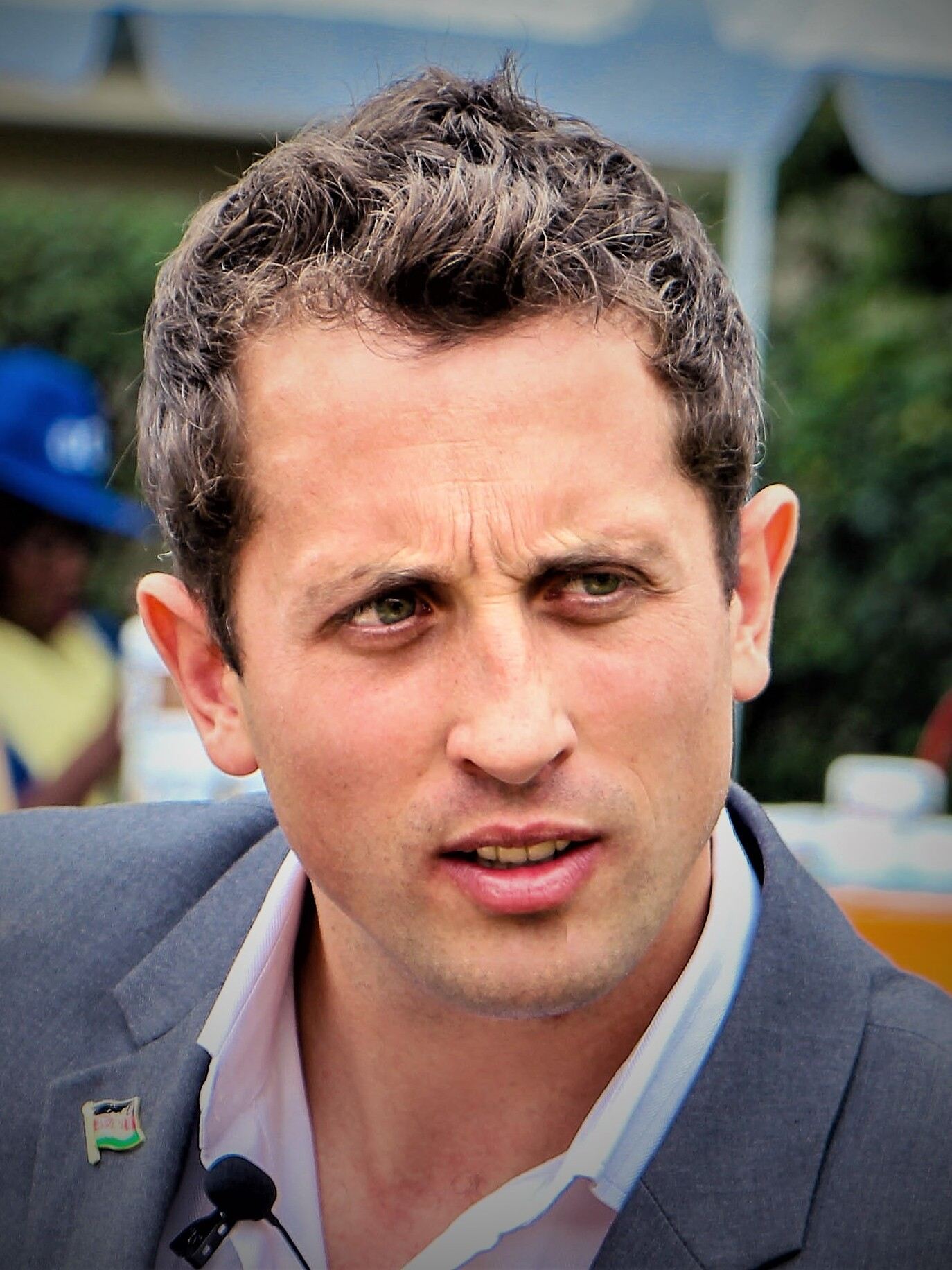
- Dunford in 2017

Personal information
- Full name: Jason Edward Dunford
- Nickname: "Samaki Mkuu"
- Nationality: Kenya United States
- Born: 28 November 1986 (age 39) Nairobi, Kenya
- Height: 6 ft 0 in (1.83 m)
- Weight: 170 lb (77 kg)

Sport
- Sport: Swimming
- Strokes: Butterfly, freestyle
- Club: Stanford, PASA, ADN Swim Project
- College team: Stanford University
Medal record
Men's swimming
Representing Kenya
Commonwealth Games
Gold medal – first place	Delhi 2010	50 m butterfly
All-Africa Games
Gold medal – first place	2007 Algiers	50 m butterfly
Gold medal – first place	2007 Algiers	100 m butterfly
Gold medal – first place	2007 Algiers	200 m butterfly
Gold medal – first place	2011 Maputo	50 m butterfly
Gold medal – first place	2011 Maputo	100 m butterfly
Silver medal – second place	2007 Algiers	50 m freestyle
Silver medal – second place	2007 Algiers	100 m backstroke
Silver medal – second place	2011 Maputo	100 m freestyle
Silver medal – second place	2011 Maputo	50 m backstroke
Silver medal – second place	2011 Maputo	200 m butterfly
Bronze medal – third place	2007 Algiers	100 m freestyle
Bronze medal – third place	2007 Algiers	200 m freestyle
Bronze medal – third place	2007 Algiers	50 m backstroke
Bronze medal – third place	2011 Maputo	50 m freestyle
Bronze medal – third place	2011 Maputo	4×100 m freestyle
Bronze medal – third place	2011 Maputo	4×200 m freestyle
Bronze medal – third place	2011 Maputo	4×100 m medley
Summer Universiade
Gold medal – first place	2009 Belgrade	100 m butterfly
Silver medal – second place	2009 Belgrade	50 m butterfly
Bronze medal – third place	2009 Belgrade	100 m freestyle
African Championships
Gold medal – first place	2006 Dakar	100 m butterfly
Gold medal – first place	2006 Dakar	50 m backstroke
Gold medal – first place	2008 Johannesburg	50 m backstroke
Gold medal – first place	2008 Johannesburg	50 m butterfly
Gold medal – first place	2008 Johannesburg	100 m butterfly
Gold medal – first place	2010 Casablanca	50 m butterfly
Gold medal – first place	2010 Casablanca	100 m butterfly
Gold medal – first place	2012 Nairobi	50 m freestyle
Gold medal – first place	2012 Nairobi	50 m butterfly
Gold medal – first place	2012 Nairobi	100 m butterfly
Silver medal – second place	2006 Dakar	100 m freestyle
Silver medal – second place	2006 Dakar	200 m freestyle
Silver medal – second place	2006 Dakar	50 m butterfly
Silver medal – second place	2008 Johannesburg	100 m freestyle
Silver medal – second place	2008 Johannesburg	200 m freestyle
Silver medal – second place	2010 Casablanca	50 m freestyle
Silver medal – second place	2010 Casablanca	100 m freestyle
Silver medal – second place	2012 Nairobi	100 m freestyle
Silver medal – second place	2012 Nairobi	50 m backstroke
Bronze medal – third place	2006 Dakar	50 m freestyle
Bronze medal – third place	2012 Nairobi	200 m freestyle

Jason Edward Dunford, OGW, OLY (born 28 November 1986), also known as Samaki Mkuu, is a Kenyan Olympic swimmer, media personality, rapper and entrepreneur. During his swimming career he was predominantly a butterfly and freestyle sprinter winning gold medals at the Commonwealth Games, Universiade, All-Africa Games and African Championships, and reaching finals at the Olympics, World Championships and Short Course World Championships. He also held African, Universiade and Olympic records. He has worked as a broadcast journalist for the BBC, is a co-founder and adviser to software company, Safi, and is the CEO of Baila Entertainment whilst performing as Samaki Mkuu, one half of the rap duo Romantico & Samaki Mkuu.

== Family life ==
Jason is the son of Martin and Geraldine Dunford. Martin Dunford is the Chairman of the Tamarind Group, which owns the Carnivore Restaurant. Geraldine is granddaughter to Abraham Block, the founder of Block Hotels, an African hospitality conglomerate that previously owned The Norfolk Hotel, Keekorock, Treetops, Nyali Beach Hotel and the New Stanley, among others. Martin was the vice-chairman of the Kenya Swimming Federation and the patron of the Nairobi Amateur Swimming Association (NASA).

He has two brothers, Robert and David. His older brother, Robert, is a graduate of the London School of Economics and has several ultra-marathon swimming firsts to his name. His younger brother, David, was also an international swimmer and represented Kenya from 2005 to 2012.

On 28 June 2014, he married Lauren Dunford (née Finzer) of Albany, California, daughter of William Finzer and Brigid McCaw.

== Career ==
=== Early career ===
Jason Dunford started swimming competitively in 1991, at the age of five and it was while at Kenton College, a primary school in Nairobi, under coach Andrew Nderu, that he began to establish himself as a top swimmer in age group for the region. At 13, the talented swimmer moved to study on a scholarship at Marlborough College in the United Kingdom.

Dunford competed in various races at the 2004 Short Course World Championships in Indianapolis, and 2005 World Championships in Montreal, but the young swimmer failed to advance past the heats.

While at Marlborough College he met coach Peter O'Sullivan, himself a former Great Britain International Swimmer in the 400 m Individual medley. O'Sullivan had swum at the University of Georgia, and it was he who encouraged Jason to look to college in the US to develop his swimming career. In 2005, after finishing his A-Levels, Dunford moved to Stanford University in the United States where he earned a swimming scholarship. In 2009, he graduated with a BA in Human biology, in 2012, he completed his MS in Earth Systems, and in 2016 he returned to the same campus, graduating with his MBA from the Stanford Graduate School of Business in June 2018.

In Shanghai he reached semi-finals in two events: 100 metres freestyle and 100 metres butterfly. He missed the 2006 Commonwealth Games due to a conflict with preparations for his first NCAA Championships.

The 2006 African Swimming Championships in Dakar, Senegal, marked a breakthrough moment for him as he became the first Kenyan ever to win a continental swimming medal with gold in the 100m butterfly on the first day of competition. He went on to finish the competition with two gold medals (100m butterfly and 50m backstroke), three silvers (50m butterfly, 100m and 200m freestyle) and one bronze (50m freestyle). He also broke a number of national records. His younger brother David Dunford also performed well, winning two golds and one silver (100m backstroke, 200m backstroke and 50m backstroke).

His success in 2006 earned him second place in the Kenyan Sportsman of the Year award, behind Alex Kipchirchir, one of Kenya's many world-class runners. His brother David Dunford was selected as the Most Promising Sportsman at the same awards.

Dunford participated in several races at the 2007 World Championships in Melbourne, Australia. His best result was reaching a 100 m butterfly final, where he finished eighth. On his way to final, he clocked 51.85, a new African record to beat Commonwealth Games Champion, Ryan Pini of Papua New Guinea in a swim-off for the 8th spot in the final. He also became the first Kenyan swimmer to qualify for the Olympics, gaining qualification for the 2008 Summer Olympics in Beijing, China in the 100m butterfly as well as the 100m freestyle. On earlier occasions, some Kenyan swimmers have participated in the Olympics, but only on the IOC swimming wild card.

At the 2007 All-Africa Games in Algiers Jason Dunford won three gold medals (50m, 100m and 200m butterfly), two silver (50m freestyle, 100m backstroke) and three bronze (50m backstroke, 100m and 200 m freestyle). For his efforts at these games and the Melbourne World Championships, Dunford was awarded the Safaricom Kenyan Sportsman of the Year Award for 2007.

=== 2008/2009 – Olympics, World Championships and Universiade ===
He participated the 2008 FINA Short Course World Championships in Manchester in April 2008 and reached the 100m butterfly final, finishing 8th.

At the 2008 Olympics he competed in two events. In the 100-metre freestyle heats, he finished 24th overall, missing the semi-finals. He did, however, set a new national record of 49.06. In his main event, the 100-metre butterfly, he qualified for the semi-finals, posting a new Olympic record of 51.14, and simultaneously bettering his own African record. The previous Olympic record (51.25) was set by Michael Phelps at the 2004 Olympics. Dunford's Olympic record did not last long; just a few minutes later Milorad Čavić of Serbia recorded 50.76, followed by two other swimmers (including Phelps) who beat Dunford's time. He reached the final and finished fifth by swimming 51.47.

In December 2008 at the African Swimming Championships in Johannesburg he won three gold and two silver medals.

His first major competition in 2009 was the Summer Universiade in Belgrade, where he won the 100 meters butterfly race in a time of 51.29. In the semi-finals he had swum a new Universiade record 50.85, also beating the African record again. At the 50 meters butterfly race he got silver behind Jernej Godec of Slovenia, but was fastest in the semi-finals, his time 23.09 being new Universiade record, still in force after the final, Dunford was also the bronze medalist over 100 metres freestyle in a time of 48.73.

At the 2009 World Championships he finished sixth in the 50 m butterfly and 100 m butterfly races. In the 100 fly semi-finals he set a new African and Commonwealth record of 50.78.

=== 2010 – Commonwealth Games ===
Dunford continued his continental medal hunting at 2010 African Swimming Championships winning two gold medals in butterfly and two freestyle silver medals.

He competed at the 2010 Commonwealth Games in Delhi taking the 50 m butterfly gold medal. It was the first swimming medal for Kenya at the Commonwealth Games.

In the presidential honors list for 2010, Jason Dunford was awarded an Order of the Grand Warrior from President Mwai Kibaki for his services rendered to the nation. This awarded elevated him from a Head of State Commendation he had received two years prior.

=== 2011 – World Championships and All Africa Games ===
Dunford placed 4th in the 100m butterfly and 7th in the 50m butterfly at the Shanghai World Championships.

Then at the All Africa Games in Maputo he won gold medals in the 50 and 100m butterfly, silvers in the 50m backstroke, 100m freestyle and 200m butterfly and a bronze in the 50m freestyle.

=== 2012 – Summer Olympics ===
At the 2012 Summer Olympics, Dunford competed in the men's 100 m butterfly only, finishing in 12th place. He was also Kenya's flag bearer.

=== 2014 – Commonwealth Games ===
At the 2014 Commonwealth Games, Dunford reached the final in the 50 and 100 m butterfly. After representing Kenya for just shy of a decade, this was his final international competition.

=== 2014 - 2016 ===
After retiring from swimming, Jason worked for two companies based in the San Francisco Bay Area, GreenCitizen and Sunrun, working in sales, business development and project management roles.

=== 2016 - 2018 – Stanford Graduate School of Business ===
In 2016, Jason enrolled at the Stanford Graduate School of Business to pursue his MBA, following earlier attainment of a BA in Human Biology and an MS in Earth Systems from Stanford University.

During the course of his MBA, he co-founded Safi Analytics with his wife Lauren and founded his own talk-show J-Talk Live.

=== 2018 - 2019 – the BBC and the emergence of Samaki Mkuu ===
After graduation with his MBA in June 2018, Dunford joined the BBC as a bilingual, broadcast journalist working on a new Africa TV business team led by Africa business editor Larry Madowo, where he reported and produced for the shows Smart Money, Biashara Bomba, Money Daily and Mitikasi Leo. In October, 2019 Jason left the BBC to pursue his music career full-time.

Dunford began rapping in September 2018 after an invitation from Romantico to collaborate on the single Mbaya. In writing his rap for the first verse, he discovered his stage name Samaki Mkuu, composing the line "Naogelea nitakuwa Samaki Mkuu". The experience led to the formation of the duo Romantico & Samaki Mkuu, the creation of the new sound Gengetone, a merger of Genge and Reggaeton, that includes Swahili, Spanish and English lyrics. The duo's second song, Baila Baila, was a collaboration with the King of Genge, Jua Cali and was released in April 2019. Their third song, Chikicha, which launched in June 2019, was a collaboration with Munju Reh. Their fourth release, Caro, came out in November 2019. Samaki Mkuu then released his first single, a collaboration with his former colleague at the BBC, Peter Mwangangi and American folk singer, Sheeba Marie. Romantico & Samaki Mkuu released One, their first album together on 18 December 2019, with 11 gengetone tracks featuring artists Phoebe Alice-Ritchie, Dinah Ndombi, Peter Mwangangi, Sheeba Marie and Munju Reh.

=== 2020 - The development of a music career ===
Following the release of their first album, Romantico & Samaki Mkuu followed up with the release of their gengetone dance track Tiki Tiki featuring Sergeant Nyakundi Next came the release of Namba Yako featuring Zambian Afropop musician, Roberto.

On 1 April 2020, Samaki Mkuu released his second album, Unified:Un Ultimo Ulimwengu, a collaboration with Jus of Jabali Afrika featuring guest artists Romantico, Yawezekana Strong, Achienge Guyo and Daktare Dan.

Following that, Samaki Mkuu and Jabali Afrika released videos for several of the tracks on the album including COVID-19, Aoko (Remix), Bila Baba, a dedication to Dads, released on Father's Day, 2020 and Freedom, released on 4 July 2020.

The music video for the track Mombasa was released on 17 July 2020 as a dedication to the city. Mombasa appears as the 7th track on Jabali Afrika's 8th studio album, Khusaire, released on 28 June 2020, on which Samaki Mkuu is also featured on the tracks Free My Soul, The Music, Global Solidarity and Hope.

In 2021, Dunford was part of a collaboration for the track Usiende Mbali by Antonio Carmona of Ketama, Romantico & Samaki Mkuu, featuring Jabali Afrika and Sanaipei Tande.

Dunford's first solo album as Samaki Mkuu, title Ocean Waters was released in 2021

Awards and achievements
Preceded by Alex Kipchirchir	Kenyan Sportsman of the Year; 2007	Succeeded by Samuel Wanjiru
Olympic Games
Preceded by Grace Momanyi	Flagbearer for Kenya; 2012 London	Succeeded by Shehzana Anwar
