= Swimming at the 2011 All-Africa Games =

The Swimming competition at the 10th All-Africa Games was held on 5–10 September 2011 at the Zimpeto Olympic Pool in Zimpeto, Maputo, Mozambique. It featured 46 long course (50 m) events, 6 of which are disability/Paralympic classification. All events were prelims/finals format, except the 800 and 1500 freestyles, which was a timed final (each entrance swims one time, fastest heat swims at night).

== Event schedule ==
Date	Monday 5 September	Tuesday 6 September	Wednesday 7 September
E v e n t s	100 free (w); 100 breast (m); 400 IM (w); 200 free (m); 50 back (w); 50 back (m); 4 × 200 Free Relay (w)	100 fly (m); 200 free (w); 400 IM (m); 200 breast (w); 50 breast (m); 50 fly (w); 800 free (m)	400 free (w); 100 free (m); 100 back (w); 200 back (m); 50 breast (w); 50 fly (m); 4 × 100 Free Relay (w); 4 × 200 Free Relay (m)
Date	Thursday 8 September	Friday 9 September	Saturday 10 September
E v e n t s	100 fly (w); 400 free (m); 100 free (w S6-S10); 100 free (m S6-S10); 100 breast (w); 200 breast (m); 800 free (w); 4 × 100 Free Relay (m)	200 fly (m); 200 IM (w); 100 back (m); 100 back (w S6-S10); 100 back (m S6-S10); 50 free (w); 1500 free (m); 4 × 100 Medley Relay (w)	200 fly (w); 50 free (m); 200 back (w); 200 IM (m S6-10); 200 IM (w S6-10); 200 IM (m); 1500 free (w); 4 × 100 Medley Relay (m)

m= men's event, w= women's event, S6-S10= disability classification
Prelims begin daily at 9:00 a.m., finals at 5:00 p.m.

== Participating nations ==
25 nations entered in Swimming at the 2011 All Africa Games:

- Algeria (13)
- Angola
- Botswana
- Republic of the Congo
- Ivory Coast (4)
- Egypt (2)
- Ethiopia
- Kenya
- Liberia
- Libya
- Mali
- Mozambique
- Namibia
- Nigeria (10)
- Rwanda
- Senegal
- Seychelles
- South Africa (42)
- Swaziland
- Tanzania
- Togo
- Tunisia
- Uganda
- Zambia
- Zimbabwe (8)

== Results ==
=== Men's results ===
Event	Gold		Silver		Bronze	
50 m freestyle	Gideon Louw; South Africa	22.34 =GR	David Dunford; Kenya	22.74	Jason Dunford; Kenya	22.87
100 m freestyle	David Dunford; Kenya	49.48	Jason Dunford; Kenya	49.71	Gideon Louw; South Africa	49.80
200 m freestyle	Ahmed Mathlouthi; Tunisia	1:48.95 GR	Darian Townsend; South Africa	1:49.04	Jean Basson; South Africa	1:51.06
400 m freestyle	Ahmed Mathlouthi; Tunisia	3:54.03 GR	Riaan Schoeman; South Africa	3:58.49	Mark Randall; South Africa	3:59.82
800 m freestyle	Ahmed Mathlouthi; Tunisia	8:10.00	Mark Randall; South Africa	8:10.04	Jasper Venter; South Africa	8:21.76
1500 m freestyle						
50 m backstroke	Charl Crous; South Africa	26.06	Jason Dunford; Kenya	26.19	Garth Tune; South Africa	26.74
100 m backstroke	Charl Crous; South Africa	55.26 GR	Darren Murray; South Africa	55.96	Mohamed Hussein; Egypt	57.63
200 m backstroke	Darren Murray; South Africa	2:01.74 GR	Charl Crous; South Africa	2:01.88	Taki Mrabet; Tunisia	2:05.19
50 m breaststroke	Cameron van der Burgh; South Africa	27.81	Malick Fall; Senegal	28.33	Nabil Kebbab; Algeria	28.71
100 m breaststroke	Cameron van der Burgh; South Africa	1:02.44	Wassim Elloumi; Tunisia	1:03.17	Nabil Kebbab; Algeria	1:03.80
200 m breaststroke	Taki Mrabet; Tunisia	2:16.51	Wassim Elloumi; Tunisia	2:18.58	Sofiane Daid; Algeria	2:19.74
50 m butterfly	Jason Dunford; Kenya	23.57 GR	Neil Watson; South Africa	24.31	Garth Tune; South Africa	24.70
100 m butterfly	Jason Dunford; Kenya	52.13 GR	Chad le Clos; South Africa	52.17	Neil Watson; South Africa	55.14
200 m butterfly	Chad le Clos; South Africa	1:56.37 GR	Jason Dunford; Kenya	2:02.52	Pedro Pinotes; Angola	2:05.47
200 m I.M.	Chad le Clos; South Africa	2:00.70 GR	Darian Townsend; South Africa	2:01.76	Taki Mrabet; Tunisia	2:03.46
400 m I.M.	Chad le Clos; South Africa	4:16.88 GR	Taki Mrabet; Tunisia	4:21.11	Riaan Schoeman; South Africa	4:25.32
4 × 100 m freestyle relay	South Africa; Leith Shankland; Chad le Clos; Gideon Louw; Darian Townsend	3:19.42 GR	Algeria; Nabil Kebbab; Oussama Sahnoune; Jughurtha Boumalie; Ryad Djendouci	3:26.51	Kenya; Jason Dunford; David Dunford; Rama Vyombo; Kiptolo Boit	3:29.84
4 × 200 m freestyle relay	South Africa; Jasper Venter; Riaan Schoeman; Leith Shankland; Darian Townsend	7:33.63 GR	Algeria; Badis Djendouci; Ryad Djendouci; Abdelghani Nefsi; Youghorta Haddad	7:49.59	Kenya; David Dunford; Amar Shah; Kiptolo Boit; Jason Dunford	8:01.07
4 × 100 m medley relay	South Africa; Charl Crous; Darian Townsend; Chad le Clos; Gideon Louw	3:46.74	Algeria; Badis Djendouci; Sofiane Daid; Oussama Sahnoune; Nabil Kebbab	3:51.09	Kenya; David Dunford; Amar Shah; Jason Dunford; Rama Vyombo	3:53.55
Multi-Class (S6-S10); 100 freestyle	Kevin Paul; South Africa	55.44	Achmat Hassiem; South Africa	55.65	Kevin Waller; South Africa	1:02.92
Multi-Class (S6-S10); 100 backstroke	Achmat Hassiem; South Africa	1:11.39	Kevin Waller; South Africa	1:18.62	Silvio Lopes; Angola	1:22.59
Multi-Class (S6-S10); 200 I.M.	Kevin Paul; South Africa	2:19.05	Achmat Hassiem; South Africa	2:29.01	Titilayo Badmus; Nigeria	2:56.73

=== Women's results ===
Event	Gold		Silver		Bronze	
50 m freestyle	Karin Prinsloo; South Africa	25.98	Nicole Horn; Zimbabwe	26.73	Suzaan van Biljon; South Africa	26.75
100 m freestyle	Karin Prinsloo; South Africa	56.05 GR	Nicole Horn; Zimbabwe	58.01	Zeineb Khalfallah; Tunisia	58.11
200 m freestyle	Karin Prinsloo; South Africa	1:59.84 GR	Zeineb Khalfallah; Tunisia	2:05.44	Natasha De Vos; South Africa	2:06.20
400 m freestyle	Roxanne Tammadge; South Africa	4:19.73	Sarra Lejnef; Tunisia	4:20.75 NR	Rene Warnes; South Africa	4:21.58
800 m freestyle	Roxanne Tammadge; South Africa	8:54.64	Rene Warnes; South Africa	8:59.23	Shrone Austin; Seychelles	9:08.10
1500 m freestyle	Roxanne Tammadge; South Africa	17:03.22 GR	Melia Mghezzi; Algeria	17:21.95	Shrone Austin; Seychelles	17:27.76
50 m backstroke	Karin Prinsloo; South Africa	29.28	Mandy Loots; South Africa	29.76	Amel Melih; Algeria	31.01
100 m backstroke	Kirsty Coventry; Zimbabwe	1:00.86 GR	Karin Prinsloo; South Africa	1:01.46	Amel Melih; Algeria	1:07.27
200 m backstroke	Kirsty Coventry; Zimbabwe	2:12.40	Mandy Loots; South Africa	2:16.68	Natasha De Vos; South Africa	2:18.18
50 m breaststroke	Suzaan van Biljon; South Africa	32.88	Miriam Corsini; Mozambique	33.74	Racheal Tonjor; Nigeria	33.81 NR
100 m breaststroke	Suzaan van Biljon; South Africa	1:10.40	Sarra Lajnef; Tunisia	1:12.78	Samantha Welch; Zimbabwe	1:15.39
200 m breaststroke	Suzaan van Biljon; South Africa	2:31.53	Sarra Lajnef; Tunisia	2:34.17	Kathryn Meaklim; South Africa	2:36.16
50 m butterfly	Farida Osman; Egypt	27.08 GR	Mandy Loots; South Africa	27.30	Binta Zahra Diop; Senegal	28.45
100 m butterfly	Mandy Loots; South Africa	59.86 GR	Kirsty Coventry; Zimbabwe	1:02.20	Bianca Meyer; South Africa	1:03.14
200 m butterfly	Mandy Loots; South Africa	2:12.46 GR	Bianca Meyer; South Africa	2:16.66	Sarah Hadj Abdelrahmane; Algeria	2:20.61
200 m I.M.	Kirsty Coventry; Zimbabwe	2:13.70	Mandy Loots; South Africa	2:15.71	Kathryn Meaklim; South Africa	2:18.60
400 m I.M.	Kirsty Coventry; Zimbabwe	4:44.34	Kathryn Meaklim; South Africa	4:46.33	Bianca Meyer; South Africa	4:51.20
4 × 100 m freestyle relay	South Africa; Karin Prinsloo; Natasha De Vos; Roxanne Tammadge; Suzaan van Biljon	3:53.93	Zimbabwe; Kirsty Coventry; Samantha Welch; Kirsten Lapham; Nicole Horn	3:57.81	Algeria; Fella Bennaceur; Malia Mghezzi Bekhouche; Sarah Hadj Abdelrahmane; Amel Melih	4:02.84
4 × 200 m freestyle relay	South Africa; Roxanne Tammadge; Rene Warnes; Karin Prinsloo; Dominique Dryding	8:28.20	Zimbabwe; Kirsten Lapham; Nicole Horn; Samantha Welch; Kirsty Coventry	8:42.23	Algeria; Malia Mghezzi Bekhouche; Fella Bennaceur; Amel Melih; Sarah Hadj Abdelrahmane	8:57.78
4 × 100 m medley relay	South Africa; Karin Prinsloo; Suzaan van Biljon; Mandy Loots; Natasha De Vos	4:14.00	Zimbabwe; Kirsten Lapham; Samantha Welch; Kirsty Coventry; Nicole Horn	4:24.01	Algeria; Amel Melih; Malia Mghezzi Bekhouche; Sarah Hadj Abdelrahmane; Fella Bennaceur	4:29.29
Multi-Class (S6-S10); 100 freestyle	Natalie Du Toit; South Africa	1:03.24	Shireen Sapiro; South Africa	1:07.62	Emily Gray; South Africa	1:08.77
Multi-Class (S6-S10); 100 backstroke	Natalie Du Toit; South Africa	1:10.86	Shireen Sapiro; South Africa	1:11.93	Irene Bandeira; Angola	1:57.66
Multi-Class (S6-S10); 200 I.M.	Natalie Du Toit; South Africa	2:35.01	Emily Gray; South Africa	2:50.20	Vera Toma Agbe-Ere; Nigeria	3:14.06

=== Medal standings ===
Swimming medal standings upon completion of the competition are:

Rank	Nation	Gold	Silver	Bronze	Total
1	South Africa	33	22	18	73
2	Tunisia	4	7	3	14
3	Zimbabwe	4	6	1	11
4	Kenya	3	4	4	11
5	Egypt	1	0	1	2
6	Algeria	0	4	9	13
7	Senegal	0	1	1	2
8	Mozambique	0	1	0	1
9	Angola	0	0	3	3
9	Nigeria	0	0	3	3
11	Seychelles	0	0	2	2
Totals (11 entries)		45	45	45	135
