= David Dunford =

Kenyan swimmer (born 1988)

Personal information
- Full name: David Harvey Dunford
- Nationality: Kenya
- Born: 29 September 1988 (age 37) Nairobi, Kenya
- Height: 6 ft 4 in (1.93 m)
- Weight: 185 lb (84 kg)

Sport
- Sport: Swimming
- Strokes: Freestyle, Backstroke
- College team: Stanford University
Medal record
Men's swimming
Representing Kenya
All-Africa Games
Gold medal – first place	2011 Maputo	100 m freestyle
Silver medal – second place	2011 Maputo	50 m freestyle
Bronze medal – third place	2011 Maputo	4×100 m freestyle
Bronze medal – third place	2011 Maputo	4×200 m freestyle
Bronze medal – third place	2011 Maputo	4×100 m medley

David Harvey Dunford (born 29 September 1988) is a swimmer from Kenya who specializes in sprint freestyle. He is an African champion, Commonwealth Games finalist and the second Kenyan swimmer in history to qualify for the Olympic Games (the first was his older brother Jason Dunford).

== Career ==
His first major senior competition was the 2005 World Championships in Montreal, but the young swimmer failed to advance heats.

At the 2006 Short Course World Championships in Shanghai he reached the 200 metres backstroke final, finishing 8th. At the 2006 Commonwealth Games, he participated in several races, his best result being reaching a final and finishing 7th at 50 metre freestyle. Later that year, at the 2006 African Swimming Championships he won the 100 metres and 200 metres backstroke, becoming the first Kenyan African Champion alongside his brother Jason. David Dunford was selected as the Most Promising Sportsman in Kenya in 2006.

In 2007, he participated in the World Championships and All-Africa Games.

He competed in the 2008 FINA Short Course World Championships in Manchester in April 2008 and reached the 50m and 100m freestyle semifinals, finishing 12th in both races.

David Dunford competed at the 2008 Summer Olympics in Beijing. In the 50 metres freestyle race, he finished 20th overall in heats and missed the semifinals by only 0.12 seconds. He did not compete in the 2008 African Swimming Championships due to his studies.

At the 2009 Summer Universiade he reached the 50 metres freestyle final, finishing sixth. At the 2009 World Championships he reached the semifinals in the 50m freestyle.

At the 2012 Summer Olympics, he competed in the 50 and 100 metre freestyle.

== Personal life ==
Dunford is the son of Martin and Geraldine Dunford. Martin Dunford is the Chairman of the Tamarind Group, which owns the Carnivore Restaurant in Nairobi; Geraldine, granddaughter of Abraham Block, founder of Block Hotels, is the marketing executive. Martin is also the vice chairman of the Kenya Swimming Federation and the patron of the Nairobi Amateur Swimming Association (NASA). He has two brothers, Robert and Jason. Jason is also a swimmer and represents Kenya.

After early childhood in Kenya, David Dunford went to Marlborough College, a secondary school in the United Kingdom, after which he attended Stanford University in California, where he studied Management Science and Engineering.
