= Zimpeto Olympic Pool =

Swimming venue in Mozambique

- Interactive map of Zimpeto Olympic Pool
- Address: Zimpeto, Maputo, Mozambique
- Coordinates: 25.8290°S 32.5792°E

Construction
- Opened: 2011

The Zimpeto Olympic Pool, also written as Zimpeto National Stadium Olympic and Piscina Olimpica de Zimpeto is a swimming venue in Zimpeto, a neighborhood of Maputo, Mozambique with an Olympic-size swimming pool. It is owned by the Sports Development Fund of the government.

== History ==
The venue was built for the 2011 All-Africa Games and hosted the swimming competitions at the 2011 All-Africa Games.

On 20 February 2016 a wall surrounding the pool collapsed after the summer 2016 swimming championship. The trainer of the national swimming team Frederico dos Santos was killed when he was in his car when the wall fell on his car. Ten other people were injured. During the day of the disaster it was hot with temperatures being over 44 degrees following by rain and high winds in the evening. The wall has not been rebuilt.

An investigation was launched into the cause of the collapse. In March 2016 Portuguese companies Mota Engil and Soares da Costa who built the stadium were accused of negligence. After denying responsibility, it was on 29 March 2016 announced the companies agreed to pay full compensation for the damage and the death of dos Santos.

In March 2017 Filipe Nyusi, the president of Mozambique, visited the swimming pool. He was very critical and accused the senior staff of the Ministry of Youth neglect of the swimming pool. There were cracks in the wall, the bathrooms were closed, the toilets clogged and without water.
