= Swimming at the 2010 Commonwealth Games – Men's 50 metre butterfly =

The Men's 50 metre butterfly event at the 2010 Commonwealth Games took place on 5 and 6 October 2010, at the SPM Swimming Pool Complex.

Six heats were held, with most containing the maximum number of swimmers (eight). The heat in which a swimmer competed did not formally matter for advancement, as the swimmers with the top sixteen times advance to the semifinals and the top eight times from there qualified for the finals.

== Heats ==
Rank	Name	Nationality	Time	Heat	Lane	Notes
1	Jason Dunford	Kenya	23.61	6	4	
2	Geoffrey Huegill	Australia	23.66	5	4	
3	Roland Schoeman	South Africa	23.76	6	5	
4	Mitchell Patterson	Australia	23.92	4	3	
5	Antony James	England	24.37	6	3	
6	Andrew Lauterstein	Australia	24.63	4	4	
7	Andrew Mayor	Scotland	24.70	6	6	
8	Virdhawal Khade	India	24.72	5	2	
9	Daniel Bell	New Zealand	24.81	5	5	
10	Ryan Pini	Papua New Guinea	24.90	5	3	
11	Ian Powell	Guernsey	25.13	6	7	
11	Moss Burmester	New Zealand	25.13	4	2	
13	Cadell Lyons	Trinidad and Tobago	25.16	4	6	
14	Alexandre Bakhtiarov	Cyprus	27.52	3	2	

== Semifinals ==
=== Semifinal 1 ===
Rank	Lane	Name	Nationality	Time	Notes
1	4	Geoffrey Huegill	Australia	23.62	Q
2	5	Mitchell Patterson	Australia	23.77	Q
3	3	Andrew Lauterstein	Australia	24.17	Q
4	6	Virdhawal Khade	India	24.38	Q
5	1	Joshua McLeod	Trinidad and Tobago	24.88	
6	2	Moss Burmester	New Zealand	24.99	
7	7	Cadell Lyons	Trinidad and Tobago	25.13	
8	8	Ramadhan Vyombo	Kenya	25.58	

=== Semifinal 2 ===
Rank	Lane	Name	Nationality	Time	Notes
1	4	Jason Dunford	Kenya	23.45	Q
2	5	Roland Schoeman	South Africa	23.75	Q
3	2	Ryan Pini	Papua New Guinea	24.36	Q
4	3	Antony James	England	24.40	Q
5	6	Andrew Mayor	Scotland	24.70	
6	1	Alexandre Bakhtiarov	Cyprus	25.14	
7	7	Ian Powell	Guernsey	25.25	
8	8	Jarryd Gregoire	Trinidad and Tobago	25.54	

== Final ==
Rank	Lane	Name	Nationality	Time	Notes
1st place, gold medalist(s)	4	Jason Dunford	Kenya	23.35	
2nd place, silver medalist(s)	5	Geoffrey Huegill	Australia	23.37	
3rd place, bronze medalist(s)	3	Roland Schoeman	South Africa	23.44	
4	6	Mitchell Patterson	Australia	23.65	
5	2	Andrew Lauterstein	Australia	23.88	
6	1	Virdhawal Khade	India	24.29	
7	7	Ryan Pini	Papua New Guinea	24.61	
8	8	Antony James	England	24.63	
