= Reem Kaseem =

Egyptian swimmer (born 1995)

Personal information
- Full name: Reem Mohamed Hussein Elsayed Kassem
- Born: 1 October 1995 (age 31)

Sport
- Sport: Swimming

Reem Kaseem (born 1 October 1995) is an Egyptian swimmer. She competed in the women's marathon 10 kilometre event at the 2016 Summer Olympics.

== Major results ==
=== Individual ===
==== Long course ====
Year	Competition	Venue	Position	Event	Notes
Representing Egypt
2012	African Championships	Nairobi, Kenya	2nd	400 m freestyle	4:26.55
2012	African Championships	Nairobi, Kenya	3rd	800 m freestyle	9:16.70
2012	African Championships	Nairobi, Kenya	3rd	1500 m freestyle	17:28.34
2013	Mediterranean Games	Mersin, Turkey	11th (h)	400 m freestyle	4:28.60
2013	Mediterranean Games	Mersin, Turkey	9th	800 m freestyle	9:10.72
2013	Islamic Solidarity Games	Palembang, Indonesia	2nd	400 m freestyle	4:23.11
2013	Islamic Solidarity Games	Palembang, Indonesia	2nd	800 m freestyle	8:59.26
2013	Islamic Solidarity Games	Palembang, Indonesia	1st	1500 m freestyle	17:08.13
2015	African Games	Brazzaville, Republic of the Congo	7th	400 m freestyle	4:37.20
2015	African Games	Brazzaville, Republic of the Congo	5th	800 m freestyle	9:25.11
2015	African Games	Brazzaville, Republic of the Congo	6th	1500 m freestyle	17:54.32

==== Open water swimming ====
Year	Competition	Venue	Position	Event	Notes
Representing Egypt
2015	World Championships	Kazan, Russia	43rd	10 km	2:09:22.3
2016	Olympic Games	Rio de Janeiro, Brazil	25th	10 km	2:05:19.1
2017	World Championships	Budapest, Hungary	47th	10 km	2:11:57.4
