= Darren Murray (swimmer) =

South African swimmer (born 1991)

Personal information
- Nationality: South Africa
- Born: April 2, 1991 (age 35) Cape Town, South Africa
- Height: 183 cm (6 ft 0 in)
- Weight: 72 kg (159 lb)

Sport
- Sport: Swimming
- Event: Backstroke
Medal record
Representing South Africa
All-Africa Games
Gold medal – first place	2011 Maputo	200m Backstroke
Silver medal – second place	2011 Maputo	100m Backstroke
- Updated on 24 September 2012

Darren James Parker Murray (born April 2, 1991, in Cape Town) is a South African swimmer. Qualified for the 2012 Summer Olympics as the first person of colour to represent South Africa in swimming at the Olympics. He competed in the Men's 200 metre backstroke, finishing in 25th place overall in the heats. During his teenage development, Murray recorded the 3rd fastest time in the world for his respective age category and discipline.

Murray has also competed at the 2008 and 2010 African Swimming Championships, the 2009, 2011 and 2013 World Aquatics Championships, the 2012 FINA World Swimming Championships (25 m), the 2011 All-Africa Games, and the 2014 Commonwealth Games.
