= Charl Crous =

South African swimmer (born 1990)

Personal information
- Nationality: South Africa
- Born: 25 September 1990 (age 35) Johannesburg, South Africa
- Height: 194 cm (6 ft 4 in)
- Weight: 88 kg (194 lb)

Sport
- Sport: Swimming
- Event: Backstroke
Medal record
Representing South Africa
Commonwealth Games
Silver medal – second place	2010 Delhi	4x100m Medley Relay
All-Africa Games
Gold medal – first place	2011 Maputo	50m Backstroke
Gold medal – first place	2011 Maputo	100m Backstroke
Gold medal – first place	2011 Maputo	4x100m Medley Relay
Silver medal – second place	2011 Maputo	200m Backstroke
- Updated on 24 September 2012

Charl Crous (born 25 September 1990 in Johannesburg) is a South African swimmer. At the 2012 Summer Olympics he finished 33rd overall in the heats in the Men's 100 metre backstroke. He was also part of the South African 4 × 100 m medley relay team.
