= Malick Fall (swimmer) =

Senegalese swimmer (born 1985)

Personal information
- Nationality: Senegal
- Born: 11 December 1985 (age 40) Dakar, Senegal

Sport
- Sport: Swimming
- Strokes: Breaststroke

Malick Fall (born 11 December 1985 in Dakar) is an Olympic swimmer from Senegal. He has swum for Senegal at the 2000, 2004, 2008, and the 2012 Olympics, without winning a medal. He is West Africa's most successful swimmer. He was Senegal's flag-bearer at the 2004 Olympics.

He has swum for Senegal at:

- Olympics: 2000, 2004, 2008, 2012
- World Championships: 2001, 2003, 2005, 2007, 2009, 2011, 2013, 2015
- African Games: 2003 (1 silver, 2 bronze), 2007 (2 bronze), 2011 (1 silver)
- African Swimming Championships: 2002 (1 silver, 2 bronze), 2004 (2 gold, 1 silver, 1 bronze), 2006 (1 silver, 1 bronze), 2008 (2 gold, 1 bronze), 2012 (1 gold, 1 silver)

Olympic Games
Preceded by Mame Tacko Diouf	Flagbearer for Senegal; 2004 Athens	Succeeded by Leyti Seck
