= Darian Townsend =

South African-American swimmer (born 1984)

Personal information
- Full name: Darian Roy Townsend
- National team: South Africa; United States
- Born: 28 August 1984 (age 42) Pinetown, KwaZulu-Natal, South Africa
- Height: 1.96 m (6 ft 5 in)
- Weight: 87 kg (192 lb)
- Spouse: Claire Townsend

Sport
- Sport: Swimming
- Strokes: Freestyle, medley
- Club: Seals Swim Club, S.A. YMCA Westside Silverfins
- College team: University of Florida; University of Arizona
- Coach: W. Riddin, G. Hill, (Seals SC); Gregg Troy (U. Florida); F. Busch, R. DeMont (U of A)
Medal record
Men's Swimming
Representing South Africa
Olympic Games
Gold medal – first place	2004 Athens	4×100 m freestyle
Commonwealth Games
Bronze medal – third place	2010 Delhi	4×100 m freestyle
Bronze medal – third place	2010 Delhi	4×200 m freestyle
All-Africa Games
Gold medal – first place	2011 Maputo	4×100 m freestyle
Gold medal – first place	2011 Maputo	4×200 m freestyle
Gold medal – first place	2011 Maputo	4×100 m medley
Silver medal – second place	2011 Maputo	200 m freestyle
Bronze medal – third place	2007 Algiers	200 m medley
Representing United States
World Championships (SC)
Gold medal – first place	2014 Doha	4×200 m freestyle
Gold medal – first place	2014 Doha	4×50 m mixed free
Silver medal – second place	2014 Doha	4×50 m freestyle
Silver medal – second place	2014 Doha	4×100 m medley
Bronze medal – third place	2014 Doha	4×100 m freestyle
Pan American Games
Silver medal – second place	2015 Toronto	4×200 m freestyle
Bronze medal – third place	2015 Toronto	4×100 m freestyle

Darian Roy Townsend (born 28 August 1984) was a competition swimmer who swam for the University of Arizona and a 2004 Athens Olympic gold medalist in the 4x100 meter freestyle relay who competed for South Africa. He became a U.S. citizen during the summer of 2014 and has subsequently represented the United States in international events. After retiring from elite competition, he later worked as a swimming coach in the Tucson area. He now is the head coach at Phoenix Swim Club.

He was born in Pinetown, KwaZulu-Natal, South Africa, on 28 August 1984, and attended Merchiston Preparatory School and Maritzburg College, where he matriculated in 2002. He participated at a high level in water polo. In high school, he swam for the Seals Pietermaritzburg, where he was coached by Wayne Riddin and Graham Hill. During his high school years, he won eight school championships, each in record times. He captured first place in the U16 School Championships in the 200 free with a time of 1:49.00, the 200 IM with a time of 2:00.00 and in the 100 back with a time of 56.4 seconds. He received first-place finishes in the U17 School Championships in the 200 IM, 100 breast, and the 50 fly.

== 2004 Athens Olympic gold ==
At the age of 19 on August 15, 2004, Townsend was a member of the South African men's 4×100 metre freestyle relay team that won gold and broke the world record at the 2004 Summer Olympics in Athens, Greece. The Olympic 4x100 meter Olympic gold medal South African relay team consisted of Roland Schoeman, Lyndon Ferns, Townsend, and Ryk Neethling.

As one of the 4x100 relay events faster South African swimmers, Roland Schoeman's opening leg opened up a small lead that remained throughout the race defeating the second place Netherlands teams by a second at the finish and more decisively defeating the United States team which took the bronze, but had often dominated the event. As anchor, Ryk Neethling swam the fastest time of the South African relay team, cementing the win in a close finish.

Townsend competed in the 2008 Beijing Olympics for South Africa in the 200 meter freestyle, 4x100 and 4x200 meter freestyle relays, the 200 meter individual medley and the 4x100 meter medley relay. In the 2012 London Olympics, he competed in the 4x100 and 4x200 freestyle relays, and the 200 meter individual medley. His best finish was in the 4x100 meter relay where he placed fifth.

== College swimming ==
=== Florida ===
He first attended the University of Florida and competed for the Florida Gators swimming and diving team in 2005 and 2006, where he was trained and managed by Head Coach Gregg Troy. At Florida, he was a 2005 NCAA Champion in the 800 Freestyle Relay. In the SEC Conference, he was a 2005 SEC Champion in the 200 freestyle, the 800 freestyle relay that set U.S. Open, NCAA, and SEC records, the 400 freestyle and medley relay. While at Florida, he was a six time All American .

=== University of Arizona ===
From 2006-2008, he swam for the University of Arizona Wildcats, under American Swimming Coaches Association Hall of Fame Coach Frank Busch, and Assistant Coach Rick DeMont. DeMont had been a 1500 and 400-meter world record holder, a 1972 Olympian who initially won the 400-meter Olympic competition, and had excelled as a former University of Arizona swimming competitor.

During his first year with Arizona, Townsend captured the 200-meter freestyle NCAA championship and the 800-meter freestyle relay NCAA championship in 2006, helping the Arizona men finish third as a team. In 2008 with Arizona, Townsend won a national title in the 200-meter individual medley and competed as a member of the 400-meter free and 400 medley National Championship relay teams.

== International competition ==
In international competition, Townsend won five medals including two golds at the All Africa games in Algiers and Maputo in 2007 and 2011 in freestyle and medley events.

In 2014, Townsend became a US citizen. He competed for the US at the 2015 Pan American Games, capturing a silver and bronze medal in relays. At the 2014 Short-Course World Championships in Doha, while again competing for the U.S., he won five medals, including two golds in relays.

In 2017, Darian retired from competitive swimming in 2017, though in one of his last events as an elite swimmer, he competed in the 2017 Midmar Mile.

=== Coaching ===
Shortly after graduating the University Arizona, he took graduate courses at Arizona and assisted with coaching at Tucson Ford Aquatics where he also continued his training.

Townsend has served as Head Coach of the YMCA West Side Silver Fins. He has also served as the Senior Aquatics Director for the Southwest Valley Family YMCA in Phoenix, Arizona.

He has been active in United States Masters Swimming. He has held over 25 Master’s age group-based World Records. In 2018, Townsend was recognized as one of Swimming World magazine’s Top 12 World Masters Swimmers of the Year, having previously received the honor in both 2014 and 2016.

Currently, he is coaching the Paradise Valley location of Phoenix Swim Club.

=== Honors ===
In August, 2024, he was inducted into the South Africa Sports Hall of Fame, along with the three other swimmers who won the gold medal in the 4x100 meter freestyle relay at the 2004 Athens Olympics.

== See also ==
- List of Commonwealth Games medallists in swimming (men)
- List of University of Florida Olympians
- List of Olympic medalists in swimming (men)
- World record progression 200 metres individual medley
- World record progression 4 × 100 metres freestyle relay

Records
Preceded by Ryan Lochte	Men's 200-metre individual medley world record-holder (short course); 15 November 2009 – 17 December 2010	Succeeded by Ryan Lochte
