= Salim Iles =

Algerian swimmer (born 1975)

Personal information
- Nationality: Algerian
- Born: 14 May 1975 (age 51) Oran, Algeria
- Height: 1.88 m (6 ft 2 in)
- Weight: 88 kg (194 lb)

Sport
- Sport: Swimming
- Strokes: Freestyle
- Club: Racing Club de France
Medal record
Men's swimming
Representing Algeria
World Championships (SC)
Silver medal – second place	2004 Indianapolis	100 m freestyle
Bronze medal – third place	2002 Moscow	100 m freestyle
All-Africa Games
Gold medal – first place	1995 Harare	100 m freestyle
Gold medal – first place	2003 Abuja	50 m freestyle
Gold medal – first place	2003 Abuja	100 m freestyle
Gold medal – first place	2007 Algiers	50 m freestyle
Gold medal – first place	2007 Algiers	100 m freestyle
Silver medal – second place	1999 Johannesburg	100 m freestyle
Bronze medal – third place	1999 Johannesburg	50 m freestyle
African Championships
Gold medal – first place	2006 Dakar	50 m freestyle
Gold medal – first place	2006 Dakar	100 m freestyle
Mediterranean Games
Silver medal – second place	1997 Bari	50 m freestyle
Gold medal – first place	1997 Bari	100 m freestyle
Gold medal – first place	2001 Tunis	50 m freestyle
Gold medal – first place	2001 Tunis	100 m freestyle
Gold medal – first place	2005 Almería	50 m freestyle
Gold medal – first place	2005 Almería	100 m freestyle

Salim Iles (born 14 May 1975, in Oran) is an Algerian swimmer who competes in the freestyle events.

He was named Algerian Sportsman of the Year in 1998. He is a scholarship holder with the Olympic Solidarity program.

== Olympic achievements ==
- 2004 Olympic Games - eighth place (50m freestyle)
- 2004 Olympic Games - seventh place (100m freestyle)
- 2000 Olympic Games - semi-finalist (100m freestyle)

Olympic Games
Preceded by Christelle Douibi	Flagbearer for Algeria; 2008 Beijing	Succeeded by Mehdi-Selim Khelifi
