= Nabil Kebbab =

Algerian swimmer (born 1983)

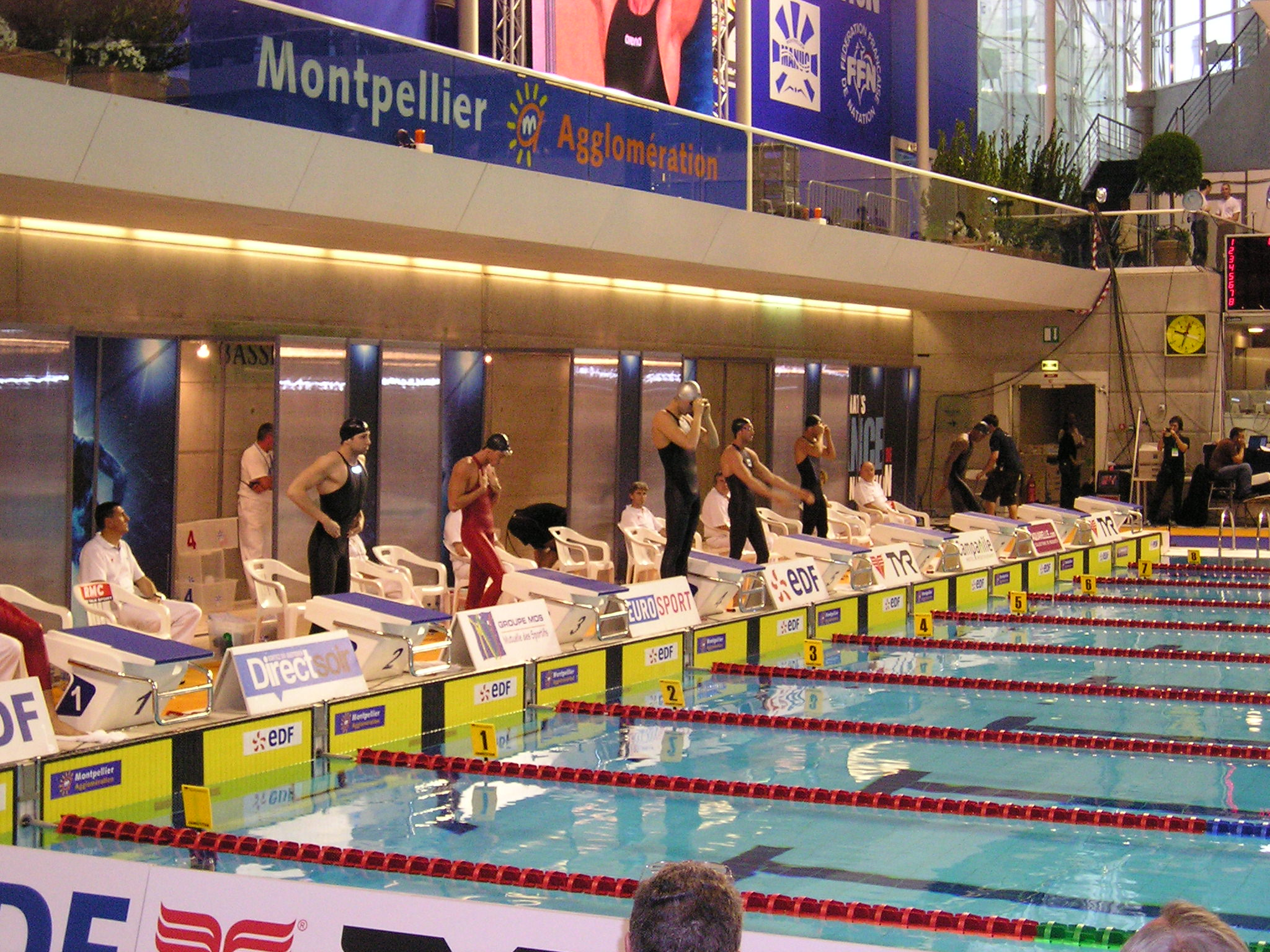

Personal information
- Native name: نبيل كباب
- Nationality: Algeria
- Born: 30 December 1983 (age 42) Tizi Ouzou, Algeria
- Height: 1.94 m (6 ft 4 in)
- Weight: 90 kg (198 lb)

Sport
- Sport: Swimming
- Strokes: Freestyle
- Club: CN Marseille
Medal record
African Championships
Gold medal – first place	2006 Dakar	100 m freestyle
Gold medal – first place	2006 Dakar	100 m freestyle
Gold medal – first place	2010 Dakar	100×4 m Freestyle
Gold medal – first place	2010 Dakar	200×4 m Freestyle
Gold medal – first place	2010 Casablanca	100 m freestyle
Gold medal – first place	2010 Casablanca	50 m breaststroke
Gold medal – first place	2010 Casablanca	100 m breaststroke
All-Africa Games
Gold medal – first place	2007 Algiers	200 m freestyle
Silver medal – second place	2007 Algiers	100 m freestyle
Silver medal – second place	2011 Maputo	4×100m freestyle
Silver medal – second place	2011 Maputo	4×100m medley
Bronze medal – third place	2011 Maputo	50m breaststroke
Bronze medal – third place	2011 Maputo	100m breaststroke
Mediterranean Games
Bronze medal – third place	2005 Almería	100 m freestyle
Bronze medal – third place	2009 Pescara	100 m freestyle

Nabil Kebbab (Arabic: نبيل كباب; born 30 December 1983) is an Algerian swimmer who competes in the freestyle events. He won the bronze medal in the men's 100 m freestyle event at the 2005 Mediterranean Games, and represented his native African country at the 2008 Summer Olympics and 2012 Summer Olympics.
