= Riaan Schoeman =

South African swimmer (born 1989)

Personal information
- Nationality: South Africa
- Born: 18 September 1989 (age 36) Vereeniging, South Africa
- Height: 176 cm (5 ft 9 in)
- Weight: 72 kg (159 lb)

Sport
- Sport: Swimming
- Event(s): Freestyle, Medley
Medal record
Representing South Africa
Commonwealth Games
Bronze medal – third place	2010 Delhi	400m Medley
All-Africa Games
Gold medal – first place	2007 Algiers	400m Medley
Gold medal – first place	2011 Maputo	4x200m Freestyle
Silver medal – second place	2007 Algiers	800m Freestyle
Silver medal – second place	2007 Algiers	1500m Freestyle
Silver medal – second place	2007 Algiers	200m Medley
Silver medal – second place	2011 Maputo	400m Freestyle
Bronze medal – third place	2011 Maputo	400m Medley
- Updated on 24 September 2012

Riaan Schoeman (born 18 September 1989) is a South African swimmer who specializes in the Individual Medley and Freestyle events. He is a multiple-time South African champion and record holder for the Individual Medley and Freestyle events. Schoeman also competes in open water events and was victorious in the 2009 edition of the Midmar Mile. His brother Henri Schoeman is also an athlete, winning bronze in the 2016 Summer Olympics triathlon.

Throughout his career he has been ranked as high as second in the 400m Individual Medley world rankings and has consistently finished among the top ten. Schoeman has represented South Africa at the 2008 Summer Olympics in Beijing and the 2012 Summer Olympics in London.

At the 2010 Commonwealth Games in Delhi, India, Schoeman claimed a bronze medal in the 400m Individual Medley. He has also competed in both the 2007 All-Africa Games in Algiers as well as the 2011 All-Africa Games held in Maputo, he received seven medals throughout these Games.
