= Suzaan van Biljon =

South African swimmer (born 1988)

Personal information
- Full name: Suzaan van Biljon
- Nationality: South Africa
- Born: 26 April 1988 (age 38) Bloemfontein, South Africa
- Height: 1.78 m (5 ft 10 in)
- Weight: 54 kg (119 lb)

Sport
- Sport: Swimming
- Strokes: Breaststroke
Medal record
World Championships (SC)
Gold medal – first place	2008 Manchester	200 m breaststroke
Silver medal – second place	2006 Shanghai	100 m breaststroke
Bronze medal – third place	2008 Manchester	100 m breaststroke
Pan Pacific Championships
Gold medal – first place	2006 Victoria	200 m breaststroke
Commonwealth Games
Bronze medal – third place	2006 Melbourne	200 m breaststroke
All-Africa Games
Gold medal – first place	2007 Algiers	50 m breaststroke
Gold medal – first place	2007 Algiers	100 m breaststroke
Gold medal – first place	2007 Algiers	200 m breaststroke
Gold medal – first place	2011 Maputo	4×100m freestyle relay
Gold medal – first place	2011 Maputo	4×100m medley relay
Bronze medal – third place	2011 Maputo	50m freestyle

Suzaan van Biljon (born 26 April 1988 in Bloemfontein, South Africa) is an Olympic-swimmer from South Africa. She swam for South Africa at the 2008 and 2012 Olympic Games. At the 2012 Olympics, she finished 7th in the 200 metre breaststroke final.

Her brother, Pite, is an international cricketer who has represented the South Africa cricket team.

== Affiliations ==
- TuksSport - University of Pretoria, South Africa

Awards
Preceded by (Zimbabwe) Kirsty Coventry	African Swimmer of the Year; 2006	Succeeded by (Zimbabwe) Kirsty Coventry
