= Swimming at the 2007 All-Africa Games =

The Swimming competition at the 9th All-Africa Games were held in Algiers, Algeria, 11 – 18 July 2007. 121 swimmers from 16 nations were entered into the 7-day competition.

All events were swum in a 50-meter (long course) pool.

== Participating nations ==
121 swimmers from 17 nations were entered in the Swimming competition:

- Algeria (18)
- Angola (6)
- Burundi (4)
- Ivory Coast (1)
- Guinea (5)
- Libya (5)
- Madagascar (1)
- Mauritius (1)
- Mali (7)
- Mozambique (6)
- Namibia (8)
- Niger (2)
- Nigeria (14)
- Senegal (16)
- South Africa (24)
- Zambia (3)}

== Event schedule ==
Date	Thursday; July 12	Friday; July 13	Saturday; July 14	Sunday; July 15
E v e n t s	400 free (m); 100 free (w); 100 breast (m); 400 IM (w); 100 fly (m); 800 Free Relay (w)	50 fly (w); 200 free (m); 200 free (w); 400 IM (m); 200 breast (w); 800 Free Relay (m)	50 breast (m); 100 free (m); 100 back (w); 200 back (m); 800 free (w); 400 Free Relay (w)	off
Date	Monday; July 16	Tuesday; July 17	Wednesday; July 18	
E v e n t s	50 back (w); 50 back (m); 100 fly (w); 200 breast (m); 100 breast (w); 800 free (m); 400 Free Relay (m)	50 breast (w); 50 fly (m); 200 fly (w); 200 IM (m); 200 back (w); 1500 free (w); 400 Medley Relay (m)	400 free (w); 50 free (m); 50 fre (w); 200 fly (m); 200 IM (w); 100 back (m); 1500 free (m); 400 Medley Relay (w)	

m= men's event, w= women's event

== Results ==
=== Men ===
Event	Gold		Silver		Bronze	
50 m freestyle	Salim Iles; Algeria	22.34	Jason Dunford; Kenya	22.73	Gideon Louw; South Africa	22.81
100 m freestyle	Salim Iles; Algeria	49.38	Nabil Kebbab; Algeria	49.82	Jason Dunford; Kenya	50.09
200 m freestyle	Nabil Kebbab; Algeria	1:50.30; NR	Jean Basson; South Africa	1:50.:33	Jason Dunford; Kenya	1:50.64
400 m freestyle	Troyden Prinsloo; South Africa	3:55.29	Ahmed Mathlouthi; Tunisia	3:55.75	Jean Basson; South Africa	3:57.97
800 m freestyle	Troyden Prinsloo; South Africa	8:02.84	Riaan Schoeman; South Africa	8:11.23	Mohamed Gadallah; Egypt	8:16.10
1500 m freestyle	Troyden Prinsloo; South Africa	15:24.93	Riaan Schoeman; South Africa	15:58.:31	Mohamed Gadallah; Egypt	16:05.20
50 m backstroke	Gerhard Zandberg; South Africa	25.68	Ahmed Hussein; Egypt	26.13	Jason Dunford; Kenya	26.31
100 m backstroke	Gerhard Zandberg; South Africa	56.53	Jason Dunford; Kenya	57.57	Garth Tune; South Africa	58.54
200 m backstroke	George du Rand; South Africa	2:02.69	Ahmed Hussein; Egypt	2:05.03	Taki Mrabet; Tunisia	2:05.35
50 m breaststroke	Cameron van der Burgh; South Africa	27.74	Thabang Moeketsane; South Africa	28.89	Malick Fall; Senegal	29.26
100 m breaststroke	Cameron van der Burgh; South Africa	1:02.05	Sofiane Daid; Algeria	1:02.11	Thabang Moeketsane; South Africa	1:02.54
200 m breaststroke	Sofiane Daid; Algeria	2:14.27	William Diering; South Africa	2:14.32	Malick Fall; Senegal	2:22.10
50 m butterfly	Jason Dunford; Kenya	23.91	Yellow Yeiyah (Nigeria)	24.46	Garth Tune; South Africa	25.02
100 m butterfly	Jason Dunford; Kenya	53.40	George du Rand; South Africa	54.97	Ahmed Nada; Egypt	55.85
200 m butterfly	Jason Dunford; Kenya	2:02.82	Ahmed Nada; Egypt	2:03.35	Ahmed Aboughazala; Egypt	2:05.12
200 m I.M.	Ahmed Mathlouthi; Tunisia	2:05.21	Riaan Schoeman; South Africa	2:05.23	Darian Townsend; South Africa	2:06.10
400 m I.M.	Riaan Schoeman; South Africa	4:21.91	Ahmed Mathlouthi; Tunisia	4.27.00	Taki Mrabet; Tunisia	4.28.83
4 × 100 m freestyle relay	South Africa	3:22.52	Algeria	3:24.36	Egypt	3:29.76
4 × 200 m freestyle relay	South Africa	7.31.70	Algeria	7.32.50; NR	Tunisia	7.43.53
4 × 100 m medley relay	South Africa	3:44.92	Algeria	3:47.31	Egypt	3:49.60

=== Women ===
Event	Gold		Silver		Bronze	
50 m freestyle	Kirsty Coventry; Zimbabwe	26.19	Heather Brand; Zimbabwe	26.65	Sarra Chahed; Tunisia	26.72
100 m freestyle	Melissa Corfe; South Africa	57.44	Liezi Mari Burger; South Africa	58.03	Heather Brand; Zimbabwe	58.08
200 m freestyle	Melissa Corfe; South Africa	2:02.45	Maroua Mathlouthi; Tunisia	2:05.11	Kathryn Meaklim; South Africa	2:06.32
400 m freestyle	Melissa Corfe; South Africa	4:15.53	Kathryn Meaklim; South Africa	4:21.97	Maroua Mathlouthi; Tunisia	4:25.83
800 m freestyle	Kirsty Coventry; Zimbabwe	8:43.89	Maroua Mathlouthi; Tunisia	8:57.91	Dominique Dryding; South Africa	9:13.12
1500 m freestyle	Natalie du Toit; South Africa	17:06.05	Maroua Mathlouthi; Tunisia	17:22.83; NR	Dominique Dryding; South Africa	17:31.51
50 m backstroke	Kirsty Coventry; Zimbabwe	28.89	Chanelle Van Wyk; South Africa	30.35	Jessica Pengelly; South Africa	30.90
100 m backstroke	Kirsty Coventry; Zimbabwe	1:01.28	Melissa Corfe; South Africa	1:05.64	Karima Lahmar; Algeria	1:06.92; NR
200 m backstroke	Kirsty Coventry; Zimbabwe	2:10.66	Melissa Corfe; South Africa	2:13.88	Jessica Pengelly; South Africa	2:15.59
50 m breaststroke	Suzaan van Biljon; South Africa	32.62	Amira Kouza; Algeria	33.03; NR	Meriem Lamri; Algeria	33.25
100 m breaststroke	Suzaan van Biljon; South Africa	1:09.74	Kirsty Coventry; Zimbabwe	1:11.86	Meriem Lamri; Algeria	1:12.39
200 m breaststroke	Suzaan van Biljon; South Africa	2:32.30	Jessica Pengelly; South Africa	2:32.30	Lydia Yefsah; Algeria	2:37.72
50 m butterfly	Mandy Loots; South Africa	27.60	Heather Brand; Zimbabwe	27.89	Binta Zahra Diop; Senegal	28.35
100 m butterfly	Mandy Loots; South Africa	1:00.:09	Heather Brand; Zimbabwe	1:00.61	Ellen Hight; Zambia	1:03.38
200 m butterfly	Mandy Loots; South Africa	2:14.28	Kathryn Meaklim; South Africa	2:14.77	Heather Brand; Zimbabwe	2:17.59
200 m I.M.	Kirsty Coventry; Zimbabwe	2:13.02	Jessica Pengelly; South Africa	2:17.79	Sarra Lajnef; Tunisia	2:23.26
400 m I.M.	Kirsty Coventry; Zimbabwe	4:39.91	Jessica Pengelly; South Africa	4:43.97	Kathryn Meaklim; South Africa	4.48.06
4 × 100 m freestyle relay	South Africa	3.56.05	Egypt	3.59.47	Tunisia	3.59.99
4 × 200 m freestyle relay	South Africa	8.28.46	Zimbabwe	8.38.20	Algeria	8.42.62
4 × 100 m medley relay	South Africa	4:10.90	Zimbabwe	4:21.60	Algeria	4:24.54; NR

=== Medal standings ===
Rank	Nation	Gold	Silver	Bronze	Total
1	South Africa	25	15	12	52
2	Zimbabwe	7	6	2	15
3	Algeria	4	6	6	16
4	Kenya	3	2	3	8
5	Tunisia	1	5	7	13
6	Egypt	0	4	6	10
7	Namibia	0	1	0	1
7	Nigeria	0	1	0	1
9	Senegal	0	0	3	3
10	Zambia	0	0	1	1
Totals (10 entries)		40	40	40	120
