= Maroua Mathlouthi =

Tunisian swimmer (born 1988)

Personal information
- Full name: Maroua Mathlouthi
- National team: Tunisia
- Born: 22 August 1988 (age 37) Tunis, Tunisia
- Height: 1.60 m (5 ft 3 in)
- Weight: 58 kg (128 lb)

Sport
- Sport: Swimming
- Strokes: Individual medley
- Club: Amiens Metropole Natation (FRA)
- College team: Southern Methodist University (U.S.)
Medal record
Women's swimming
Representing Tunisia
All-Africa Games
Silver medal – second place	2007 Algiers	200 m freestyle
Silver medal – second place	2007 Algiers	400 m freestyle
Silver medal – second place	2007 Algiers	1500 m freestyle
Bronze medal – third place	2007 Algiers	800 m freestyle

Maroua Mathlouthi (born August 22, 1988 in Tunis) is a Tunisian swimmer, who specialized in freestyle and individual medley events. She is a multiple-time Pan Arab Games champion, and a two-time gold medalist for her respective categories (800 m freestyle and 400 m individual medley) at the 2006 African Swimming Championships in Dakar, Senegal. Mathlouthi had won a total of four medals, including three silver for the women's freestyle (200, 400, and 1500 m) at the 2007 All-Africa Games in Algiers, Algeria.

Mathlouthi was slated to compete in a medley double at the 2008 Summer Olympics in Beijing, but withdrew from the competition for personal and health reasons.

Mathlouthi also served as a varsity swimmer of the SMU Mustangs at the Southern Methodist University in Dallas, Texas, and a member of Amiens Metropole Natation in Amiens, France. She is also the sister of Ahmed Mathlouthi, who competed in the men's 200 m freestyle at the 2012 Summer Olympics in London.
