= Ahmed Salah Abdou =

Egyptian swimmer

Personal information
- Born: December 6, 1986 (age 39) Cairo, Egypt

Sport
- Sport: Swimming
Medal record
Representing Egypt
African Games
Silver medal – second place	2007 Algiers	200m butterfly
Bronze medal – third place	2003 Abuja	100m butterfly
Bronze medal – third place	2007 Algiers	100m butterfly

Ahmed Salah Abdou Nada (Arabic: أحمد صلاح عبده ندا; born 6 December 1986), also known as Ahmed Salah Abdou or Ahmed Nada, is an Egyptian swimmer, who specialized in butterfly events. He represented his nation Egypt at the 2008 Summer Olympics, finishing among the top 60 swimmers in the men's 100 m butterfly.

Nada competed for the Egyptian swimming team in the men's 100 m butterfly at the 2008 Summer Olympics in Beijing. He charged his way to the top of the field in 54.48 to clear the FINA-B cut (54.70) by about two tenths of a second (0.2) at the Pan Arab Games one year earlier in Cairo. Swimming in heat two, Nada fought off a sprint challenge against Saudi Arabia's Bader Al-Muhana on the final lap, until both touched the wall in a matching fifth-place time in 55.59. Sharing a tie with Al-Muhana for sixty-first overall in the prelims, Nada did not advance to the semifinals.
