= Oussama Sahnoune =

Algerian swimmer (born 1992)

Personal information
- Native name: Oussama Sahnoune
- Nationality: Algerian
- Born: 2 August 1992 (age 34) Constantine, Algeria
- Height: 1.86 m (6 ft 1 in)
- Weight: 80 kg (180 lb)

Sport
- Sport: Swimming
- Strokes: Freestyle
- Club: Benfica
Medal record
Representing Algeria
Mediterranean Games
Gold medal – first place	2018 Tarragona	100 m freestyle
Silver medal – second place	2018 Tarragona	50 m freestyle
Bronze medal – third place	2022 Oran	50 m freestyle
African Games
Gold medal – first place	2019 Rabat	100 m freestyle
Silver medal – second place	2011 Maputo	4×100 m freestyle
Silver medal – second place	2011 Maputo	4×100 m medley
Silver medal – second place	2019 Rabat	50 m freestyle
African Championships
Gold medal – first place	2016 Bloemfontein	50 m freestyle
Gold medal – first place	2016 Bloemfontein	100 m freestyle
Gold medal – first place	2022 Tunis	100 m freestyle
Gold medal – first place	2022 Tunis	4×100 m medley
Silver medal – second place	2022 Tunis	4×100 m freestyle
Silver medal – second place	2022 Tunis	4×100 m mixed freestyle
Silver medal – second place	2012 Nairobi	50 m freestyle
Silver medal – second place	2012 Nairobi	50 m butterfly
Silver medal – second place	2022 Tunis	50 m freestyle
Bronze medal – third place	2012 Nairobi	100 m freestyle
Bronze medal – third place	2012 Nairobi	100 m butterfly
Bronze medal – third place	2012 Nairobi	4×100 m freestyle
Bronze medal – third place	2016 Bloemfontein	4×100 m mixed freestyle
Bronze medal – third place	2016 Bloemfontein	4×100 m mixed medley

Oussama Sahnoune (Arabic: أسامة سحنون; born 2 August 1992) is an Algerian swimmer who competes in the freestyle events. He competed in the men's 50 metre and men's 100 metre freestyle events at the 2016 Summer Olympics.

== Olympic achievements ==
- 2016 Summer Olympics - 25th place (50m freestyle)
- 2016 Summer Olympics - 31st place (100m freestyle).
- 2020 Summer Olympics - 37th place (50m freestyle)
- 2020 Summer Olympics - 37th place (100m freestyle)

== World Aquatics Championships achievements ==
- 2013 World Aquatics Championships - (20th place), (50m freestyle).
- 2013 World Aquatics Championships - (27th place), (100m freestyle).
- 2017 World Aquatics Championships - (20th place), (50m freestyle).
- 2017 World Aquatics Championships - (9th place) (Semi final),(100m freestyle).
- 2019 World Aquatics Championships - (24th place), (50m freestyle).
- 2019 World Aquatics Championships - (23rd place), (100m freestyle).
- 2022 World Aquatics Championships - (33rd place), (50m freestyle).
- 2023 World Aquatics Championships - (58th place), (50m freestyle).
- 2023 World Aquatics Championships - (56th place), (100m freestyle).

== Career best times ==
=== Long course (50-meter pool) ===
Event	Time	Venue	Date	Notes
50 m freestyle	21.82	tunis	15 July 2018	NR
100 m freestyle	48.00	Tarragona	24 June 2018	NR
200 m freestyle	1:50.02	Algiers	19 June 2013	NR
50 m butterfly	24.37	Marseille	6 April 2018	
100 m butterfly	53.50	Tunis	July 2018	
200 m butterfly	2:08.52	Bordeaux	1 June 2014	
200 m IM	2:10.40	Montpellier	28 February 2015	
