= Sofiane Daid =

Algerian swimmer (born 1982)

Personal information
- Full name: سفيان دايد
- Nationality: Algeria
- Born: 6 November 1982 (age 43) Tizi Ouzou, Kabylie, Algeria
- Height: 1.83 m (6 ft 0 in)
- Weight: 78 kg (172 lb)

Sport
- Sport: Swimming
- Strokes: Breaststroke
- Club: Largardère Paris
Medal record
Gold medal – first place	2006 Dakar	200m Breaststroke
Silver medal – second place	2006 Dakar	100m Breaststroke
Silver medal – second place	2006 Dakar	200m Butterfly
Silver medal – second place	2010 Casablanca	50 m breaststroke
Silver medal – second place	2010 Casablanca	200 m breaststroke
Bronze medal – third place	2010 Casablanca	100 m breaststroke
All-Africa Games
Gold medal – first place	2007 Algiers	200 breast
Silver medal – second place	2007 Algiers	100 breast
Silver medal – second place	2003 Abuja	50 breast
Silver medal – second place	2003 Abuja	100 breast
Silver medal – second place	2011 Maputo	4×100m medley relay
Bronze medal – third place	2011 Maputo	200m breaststroke
Mediterranean Games
Bronze medal – third place	2005 Almería	200 m breaststroke

Sofiane Daid (born 6 November 1982) is a two-time Olympic breaststroke swimmer from Algeria. He swam for Algeria at the 2004 and 2008 Olympics.

He has swum for Algeria at the:

- Olympics: 2004, 2008
- All-Africa Games: 2003, 2007, 2011
- Mediterranean Games: 2005
- World Championships: 2005, 2007, 2009, 2011
- African Championships: 2006, 2010
