= Sara El Bekri =

Moroccan swimmer (born 1987)

Personal information
- National team: MAR
- Born: 2 July 1987 (age 39) Casablanca, Morocco
- Height: 1.72 m (5 ft 8 in)
- Weight: 64 kg (141 lb)

Sport
- Sport: Swimming
- Strokes: Breaststroke
Medal record
Women's swimming
Representing Morocco
Pan Arab Games
Gold medal – first place	2011 Doha	50 m breaststroke
Gold medal – first place	2011 Doha	100 m breaststroke
Gold medal – first place	2011 Doha	200 m breaststroke
Gold medal – first place	2011 Doha	200 m butterfly
Gold medal – first place	2011 Doha	400 m medley
Silver medal – second place	2011 Doha	200 m freestyle
Silver medal – second place	2011 Doha	400 m freestyle
Silver medal – second place	2011 Doha	800 m freestyle
Silver medal – second place	2011 Doha	200 m medley
Silver medal – second place	2011 Doha	4×100 m medley
African Championships
Gold medal – first place	2010 Casablanca	50 m breaststroke
Gold medal – first place	2010 Casablanca	100 m breaststroke
Silver medal – second place	2006 Dakar	200 m breaststroke
Silver medal – second place	2010 Casablanca	200 m breaststroke
Silver medal – second place	2010 Casablanca	4×100 m medley
Silver medal – second place	2010 Casablanca	5 km open water
Bronze medal – third place	2006 Dakar	50 m breaststroke
Bronze medal – third place	2006 Dakar	100 m breaststroke
Bronze medal – third place	2010 Casablanca	100 m freestyle

Sara El Bekri (Arabic: سارة البكري; born 2 July 1987) is a Moroccan swimmer who competes in the women's 400m individual medley.

At the 2008 Summer Olympics, she competed in the women's 100 and 200 m breaststroke, but did not qualify for either final. At the 2012 Summer Olympics she finished 32nd overall in the heats in the Women's 400 metre individual medley and failed to reach the final. She also competed in the 100 and 200 metre breaststroke without reaching those finals.
