= Mandy Loots =

South African swimmer

Personal information
- Full name: Amanda Toni Loots
- Born: 3 August 1978 (age 47) Gwelo, Rhodesia
- Height: 1.68 m (5 ft 6 in)
- Weight: 59 kg (130 lb)

Sport
- Sport: Swimming
- Strokes: butterfly
Medal record
All-Africa Games
| Gold medal – first place | 2011 Maputo | 100m butterfly |
| Gold medal – first place | 2011 Maputo | 200m butterfly |
| Gold medal – first place | 2011 Maputo | 4×100m medley relay |
| Silver medal – second place | 2011 Maputo | 50m backstroke |
| Silver medal – second place | 2011 Maputo | 200m backstroke |
| Silver medal – second place | 2011 Maputo | 50m butterfly |
| Silver medal – second place | 2011 Maputo | 200m medley |

Amanda Toni "Mandy" Loots (born 3 August 1978 in Gwelo, Rhodesia) is a South African Olympic and national-record-holding swimmer.

== Swimming career ==
Loots swam for South Africa at the 1996, 2000 and 2008 Olympics.

Despite being of South African nationality she won the ASA National British Championships over 100 metres butterfly and the 400 metres medley in 1999.

At the 1999 All-Africa Games, she was South Africa's most decorated athlete at the Games, winning 6 gold medals. In November 2009, she set the African Record and South African Record in the short-course (25m) 200 fly.

She has swum for South Africa at the:

- Olympics: 1996, 2000, 2008
- Commonwealth Games: 1994, 2002, 2006
- All-Africa Games: 1999, 2007
- African Swimming Championships: 2008, 2010

Awards
| Preceded by (Zimbabwe) Kirsty Coventry | African Swimmer of the Year; 2010 | Succeeded by (Zimbabwe) Kirsty Coventry |
