= Mehdi Hamama =

Algerian swimmer

Personal information
- Full name: Mehdi Hamama
- Nationality: Algeria
- Born: 7 May 1985 (age 41) Algiers, Algeria
- Height: 1.87 m (6 ft 2 in)
- Weight: 88 kg (194 lb)

Sport
- Sport: Swimming
- Strokes: Individual medley

Mehdi Hamama (Arabic: مهدي حمامة; born May 7, 1985) is an Algerian swimmer, who specialized in individual medley events. He represented his nation Algeria at the 2008 Summer Olympics, placing himself among the top 50 swimmers in the men's 200 m individual medley.

Hamama competed for Algeria in the men's 200 m individual medley at the 2008 Summer Olympics in Beijing. Two months before the Games, he eclipsed a FINA B-standard entry time of 2:05.54 at the Mare Nostrum Barcelona Meet in Spain. Rallying from fifth on the breaststroke leg in heat one, Hamama put up a tremendous effort to improve his lifetime best and smash a sub-2:05 barrier for the fourth spot in 2:04.91. Hamama failed to advance into the semifinals, as he placed forty-first overall in the prelims.
