= Taki Mrabet =

Tunisian swimmer (born 1989)

Taki M'Rabet
Personal information
- Nationality: Tunisia
- Born: 28 February 1989 (age 37) Paris, France
- Height: 178 cm (5 ft 10 in)
- Weight: 78 kg (172 lb)

Sport
- Sport: Swimming
- Event(s): Medley, freestyle, backstroke, breaststroke, butterfly
Medal record
Representing Tunisia
All-Africa Games
Bronze medal – third place	2007 Algiers	200 m backstroke
Bronze medal – third place	2007 Algiers	400 m medley
Gold medal – first place	2011 Maputo	200 m breaststroke
Silver medal – second place	2011 Maputo	400 m medley
Bronze medal – third place	2011 Maputo	200 m backstroke
Bronze medal – third place	2011 Maputo	200 m medley
Pan Arab Games
Gold medal – first place	2007 Cairo	200 m backstroke
Gold medal – first place	2007 Cairo	200 m medley
Silver medal – second place	2007 Cairo	100 m backstroke
Bronze medal – third place	2007 Cairo	4×200 m freestyle
Bronze medal – third place	2007 Cairo	4×100 m Medley
Gold medal – first place	2011 Doha	4×100 m freestyle
Gold medal – first place	2011 Doha	4×200 m freestyle
Silver medal – second place	2011 Doha	200 m backstroke
Silver medal – second place	2011 Doha	200 m breaststroke
Silver medal – second place	2011 Doha	200 m medley
Silver medal – second place	2011 Doha	400 m medley
Silver medal – second place	2011 Doha	4×100 m medley
Bronze medal – third place	2011 Doha	50m butterfly
Bronze medal – third place	2011 Doha	100m butterfly
Mediterranean Games
Bronze medal – third place	2013 Mersin	400 m medley
- Updated on 24 September 2012

Taki Mrabet (born 28 February 1989, in Paris) is a Tunisian swimmer who competed at the 2012 Summer Olympics. He competed in the men's 200 and 400m individual medley.
