= Ahmed Mathlouthi =

Tunisian swimmer (born 1989)

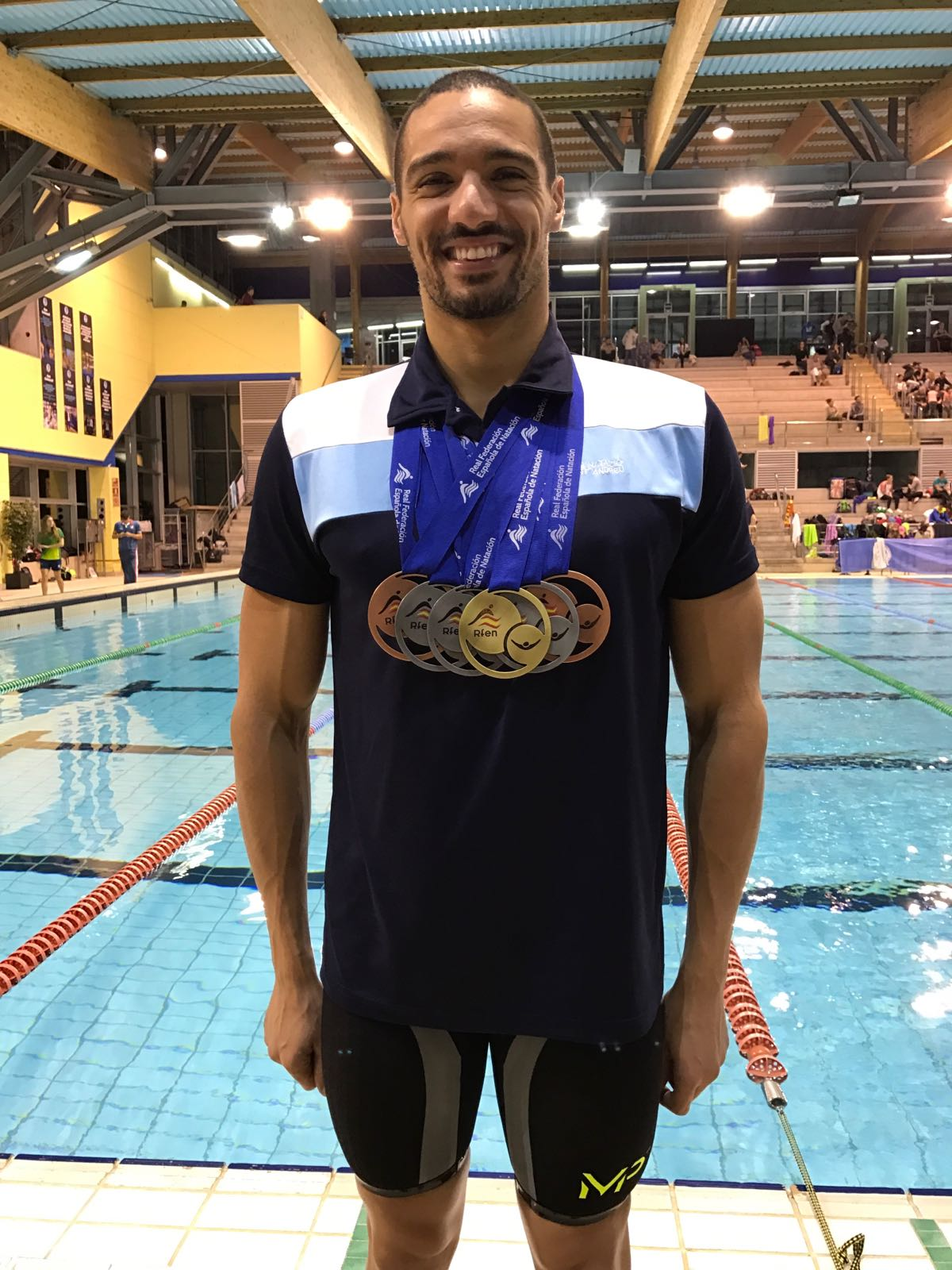

Personal information
- Nationality: Tunisian
- Born: 18 December 1989 (age 36) Tunis, Tunisia
- Height: 190 cm (75 in)
- Weight: 90 kg (198 lb)

Sport
- Sport: Swimming
- Event: Freestyle
- Club: Espérance Sportive de Tunis
Medal record
Men's swimming
Representing Tunisia
All-Africa Games
Gold medal – first place	2007 Algiers	200m Medley
Silver medal – second place	2007 Algiers	400m Freestyle
Silver medal – second place	2007 Algiers	400m Medley
Gold medal – first place	2011 Maputo	200m Freestyle
Gold medal – first place	2011 Maputo	400m Freestyle
Gold medal – first place	2011 Maputo	800m Freestyle
Pan Arab Games
Gold medal – first place	2007 Cairo	400m Freestyle
Gold medal – first place	2007 Cairo	800m Freestyle
Gold medal – first place	2007 Cairo	1500m Freestyle
Gold medal – first place	2007 Cairo	400m Medley
Silver medal – second place	2007 Cairo	200m Medley
Bronze medal – third place	2007 Cairo	4x200m Freestyle
Bronze medal – third place	2007 Cairo	4x100m Medley
Gold medal – first place	2011 Doha	4x100m Freestyle
Gold medal – first place	2011 Doha	4x200m Freestyle
Silver medal – second place	2011 Doha	4x100m Medley
Bronze medal – third place	2011 Doha	200m Freestyle
Bronze medal – third place	2011 Doha	400m Freestyle
Bronze medal – third place	2011 Doha	1500m Freestyle
- Updated on 24 September 2012

Ahmed Mathlouthi (born 18 December 1989 in Tunis) is a Tunisian swimmer. He competed at the 2012 Summer Olympics and the 2016 Summer Olympics. As well as being a multiple times All-Africa Games medalist, he has also won 3 medals at Swimming World Cup events.
