= 2008 FINA Swimming World Cup =

The 2008 FINA/ARENA Swimming World Cup was held in October and November 2008. The meet scheduling matched that of the 2007 series, with all meets held short course metres (25 m) format.

The series winners were Cameron van der Burgh of South Africa and Marieke Guehrer of Australia.

== Venues ==
The 2008 World Cup was staged at seven venues on five continents, with each meet following a heats and finals format for all events, with the exception of the 800 m and 1500 m freestyle and 400 m individual medley events which were heat-declared winners. The Brazil meet at Belo Horizonte was held as a three-day meet with evening heats and finals the following morning, with the remaining six meets being held over two days with morning heats and evening finals on each day. The order of events at each meet was the same.

Date	Location	Results
10–12 October	Belo Horizonte, Brazil	
17–18 October	Durban, South Africa	
25–26 October	Sydney, Australia	
1–2 November	Singapore	
8–9 November	Moscow, Russia	
11–12 November	Stockholm, Sweden	
15–16 November	Berlin, Germany	

== Results ==
=== Overall World Cup ===
At each meet of the World Cup circuit in 2008, the FINA Points Table was used to rank all swim performances at the meet. The top 10 men and top 10 women were then awarded World Cup points. Bonus points were awarded for a world record broken (20 points) or equalled (10 points). The number of World Cup points awarded were doubled for the final meet of the World Cup in Berlin.

Rank on FINA Points	World Cup points awarded
1	25
2	20
3	16
4	13
5	10
6	7
7	5
8	3
9	2
10	1

The final rankings are shown below. Bonus points were awarded to eight swimmers for each of the twelve new world record standards set during the meets.

==== Men ====
Rank	Name	Nationality	Points awarded (Bonus)							Total
Rank	Name	Nationality	BRA	RSA	AUS	SIN	RUS	SWE	GER	Total
1	Cameron van der Burgh	South Africa	–	25	–	25	25 (40)	25 (20)	32	192
2	Peter Marshall	United States	–	10	–	3	–	20 (40)	40 (20)	133
3	Randall Bal	United States	7	16	–	20	–	16	50 (20)	129
4	Robert Hurley	Australia	–	–	20 (20)	16	20	7	2	85
5	Christian Sprenger	Australia	25	20	10	5	10	–	–	70
6	Oussama Mellouli	Tunisia	3	13	13	10	5	1	20	65
7	Matt Jaukovic	Australia	–	–	25 (20)	7	2	2	6	62
8	Paul Biedermann	Germany	–	–	–	–	–	–	26 (20)	46
9	Stanislav Donets	Russia	20	–	16	–	7	–	–	43
10	Stefan Nystrand	Sweden	5	2	–	2	13	13	–	35
11	Evgeny Korotyshkin	Russia	10	–	–	1	1	3	10	25
12	Igor Borysik	Ukraine	–	–	–	–	16	5	–	21
13	Darian Townsend	South Africa	–	3	–	–	3	–	14	20
14	César Cielo Filho	Brazil	16	–	–	–	–	–	–	16
15	Thiago Pereira	Brazil	2	–	–	13	–	–	–	15
16	Nicholas Santos	Brazil	13	–	–	–	–	–	–	13
17	Frédérick Bousquet	France	–	–	–	–	–	10	–	10
18=	Ashley Delaney	Australia	–	–	7	–	–	–	–	7
18=	William Diering	South Africa	–	7	–	–	–	–	–	7
20=	George Du Rand	South Africa	–	5	–	–	–	–	–	5
20=	Chris Wright	Australia	–	–	5	–	–	–	–	5
22	Alain Bernard	France	–	–	–	–	–	–	4	4
23	Kyle Richardson	Australia	–	–	3	–	–	–	–	3
24	Nick D'Arcy	Australia	–	–	2	–	–	–	–	2
25=	Felipe Lima	Brazil	–	1	–	–	–	–	–	1
25=	Felipe Silva	Brazil	1	–	–	–	–	–	–	1
25=	Lachlan Staples	Australia	–	–	1	–	–	–	–	1

==== Women ====
Rank	Name	Nationality	Points awarded (Bonus)							Total
Rank	Name	Nationality	BRA	RSA	AUS	SIN	RUS	SWE	GER	Total
1	Marieke Guehrer	Australia	25	25	25	25	16	13	50 (20)	199
2	Therese Alshammar	Sweden	16	13	–	16	20	20 (20)	32	137
3	Kathryn Meaklim	South Africa	3	16	10	13	–	16	20	78
4	Tao Li	Singapore	–	–	–	20	13	1	26	60
5	Sarah Katsoulis	Australia	–	–	5	10	10	7	14	46
6	Melissa Ingram	New Zealand	–	10	13	7	7	–	4	41
7	Coralie Balmy	France	–	–	–	–	–	–	40	40
8	Valentina Artemyeva	Russia	13	–	–	–	25	–	–	38
9	Josefin Lillhage	Sweden	20	7	–	–	1	3	2	33
10	Hanna-Maria Seppälä	Finland	–	–	–	–	–	25	–	25
11=	Cate Campbell	Australia	–	–	20	–	–	–	–	20
11=	Jessica Pengelly	South Africa	–	20	–	–	–	–	–	20
13	Emily Seebohm	Australia	–	–	16	–	–	–	–	16
14	Petra Granlund	Sweden	–	–	–	–	–	5	10	15
15=	Tara Kirk	United States	10	–	–	2	–	–	–	12
15=	Fabíola Molina	Brazil	7	5	–	–	–	–	–	12
17	Jeanette Ottesen	Denmark	–	–	–	–	–	10	–	7
18	Lotte Friis	Denmark	–	–	–	–	–	2	6	8
19=	Jade Edmistone	Australia	–	–	7	–	–	–	–	7
19=	Sarah Sjöström	Sweden	–	–	2	5	–	–	–	7
21	Sophie Edington	Australia	5	1	–	–	–	–	–	6
22	Elena Sokolova	Russia	–	–	–	–	5	–	–	5
23	Melissa Corfe	South Africa	–	3	–	1	–	–	–	4
24=	Ellen Fullerton	Australia	–	–	3	–	–	–	–	3
24=	Kristel Köbrich	Chile	–	–	–	–	3	–	–	3
24=	Kelly Stubbins	Australia	–	–	–	3	–	–	–	3
27=	Brooke Bishop	United States	2	–	–	–	–	–	–	2
27=	Olga Detenyuk	Russia	–	–	–	–	2	–	–	2
27=	Mandy Loots	South Africa	–	2	–	–	–	–	–	2
30=	Bronte Barratt	Australia	–	–	1	–	–	–	–	1
30=	Carolina Henao	Colombia	1	–	–	–	–	–	–	1

=== Event winners ===
==== 50 m freestyle ====
Meet	Men			Women		
Meet	Winner	Nationality	Time	Winner	Nationality	Time
Belo Horizonte	César Cielo Filho	Brazil	21.32	Brooke Bishop	United States	24.66
Durban	Stefan Nystrand	Sweden	21.42	Therese Alshammar	Sweden	24.46
Sydney	Kyle Richardson	Australia	21.45	Cate Campbell	Australia	23.97
Singapore	Stefan Nystrand	Sweden	21.39	Therese Alshammar	Sweden	24.33
Moscow	Lyndon Ferns	South Africa	21.59	Therese Alshammar	Sweden	24.60
Stockholm	Frédérick Bousquet	France	20.97	Marieke Guehrer	Australia	24.25
Berlin	Alain Bernard	France	21.25	Therese Alshammar	Sweden	24.16

==== 100 m freestyle ====
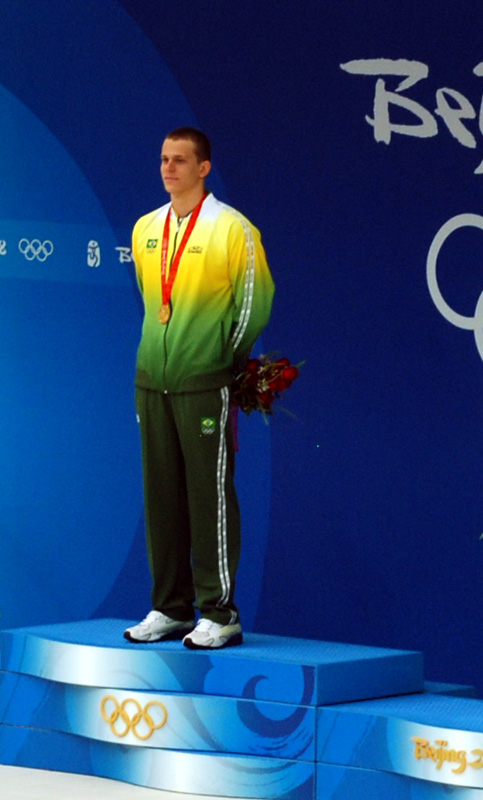
César Cielo Filho, winner of the men's 50 m and 100 m freestyle at the first leg of the 2008 World Cup in Belo Horizonte.

Meet	Men			Women		
Meet	Winner	Nationality	Time	Winner	Nationality	Time
Belo Horizonte	César Cielo Filho	Brazil	47.18	Marieke Guehrer	Australia	53.27
Durban	Darian Townsend	South Africa	47.24	Josefin Lillhage	Sweden	53.07
Sydney	Stefan Nystrand	Sweden	47.45	Marieke Guehrer	Australia	53.15
Singapore	Stefan Nystrand	Sweden	46.78	Sarah Sjöström	Sweden	53.94
Moscow	Stefan Nystrand	Sweden	46.57	Josefin Lillhage	Sweden	53.47
Stockholm	Stefan Nystrand	Sweden	46.03	Hanna-Maria Seppälä	Finland	52.44
Berlin	Alain Bernard	France	46.28	Josefin Lillhage	Sweden	52.87

==== 200 m freestyle ====
Meet	Men			Women		
Meet	Winner	Nationality	Time	Winner	Nationality	Time
Belo Horizonte	Oussama Mellouli	Tunisia	1:44.58	Josefin Lillhage	Sweden	1:57.05
Durban	Oussama Mellouli	Tunisia	1:43.62	Josefin Lillhage	Sweden	1:55.91
Sydney	Oussama Mellouli	Tunisia	1:43.05	Ellen Fullerton	Australia	1:56.35
Singapore	Oussama Mellouli	Tunisia	1:44.47	Kelly Stubbins	Australia	1:56.38
Moscow	Darian Townsend	South Africa	1:43.44	Josefin Lillhage	Sweden	1:56.00
Stockholm	Oussama Mellouli	Tunisia	1:42.86	Petra Granlund	Sweden	1:54.77
Berlin	Paul Biedermann	Germany	1:40.83 WR	Coralie Balmy	France	1:54.05

==== 400 m freestyle ====
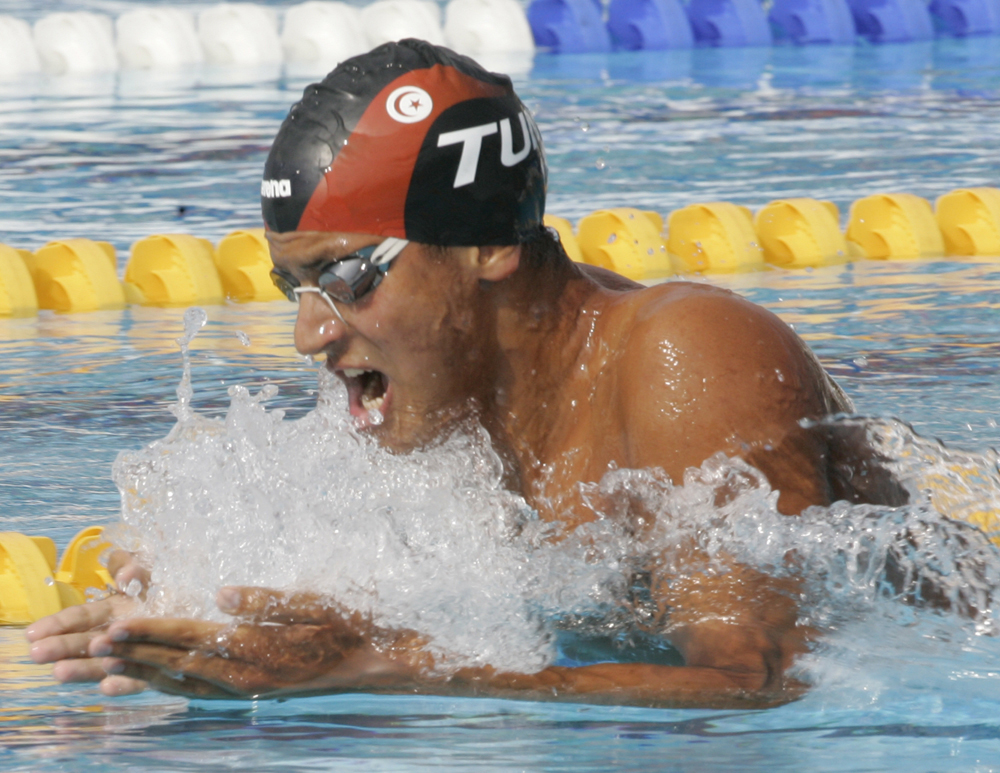
Oussama Mellouli, winner of twenty-eight World Cup titles in 2008, including six titles the 400 m freestyle.

Meet	Men			Women		
Meet	Winner	Nationality	Time	Winner	Nationality	Time
Belo Horizonte	Armando Negreiros	Brazil	3:45.78	Kathryn Meaklim	South Africa	4:14.95
Durban	Oussama Mellouli	Tunisia	3:42.32	Melissa Ingram	New Zealand	4:05.62
Sydney	Oussama Mellouli	Tunisia	3:40.49	Melissa Ingram	New Zealand	4:03.31
Singapore	Oussama Mellouli	Tunisia	3:42.37	Melissa Ingram	New Zealand	4:04.55
Moscow	Oussama Mellouli	Tunisia	3:40.52	Elena Sokolova	Russia	4:03.99
Stockholm	Oussama Mellouli	Tunisia	3:38.42	Lotte Friis	Denmark	4:02.64
Berlin	Oussama Mellouli	Tunisia	3:36.75	Coralie Balmy	France	3:56.24 WC

==== 1500 m (men) / 800 m (women) freestyle ====
Meet	Men			Women		
Meet	Winner	Nationality	Time	Winner	Nationality	Time
Belo Horizonte	Oussama Mellouli	Tunisia	15:16.43	Kathryn Meaklim	South Africa	8:49.76
Durban	Oussama Mellouli	Tunisia	14:54.73	Kathryn Meaklim	South Africa	8:42.50
Sydney	Oussama Mellouli	Tunisia	14:43.05	Kathryn Meaklim	South Africa	8:32.62
Singapore	Oussama Mellouli	Tunisia	15:06.05	Melissa Corfe	South Africa	8:35.75
Moscow	Oussama Mellouli	Tunisia	14:34.31	Elena Sokolova	Russia	8:18.52
Stockholm	Mads Glæsner	Denmark	14:38.87	Lotte Friis	Denmark	8:14.99
Berlin	Mads Glæsner	Denmark	14:38.97	Lotte Friis	Denmark	8:14.41

==== 50 m backstroke ====
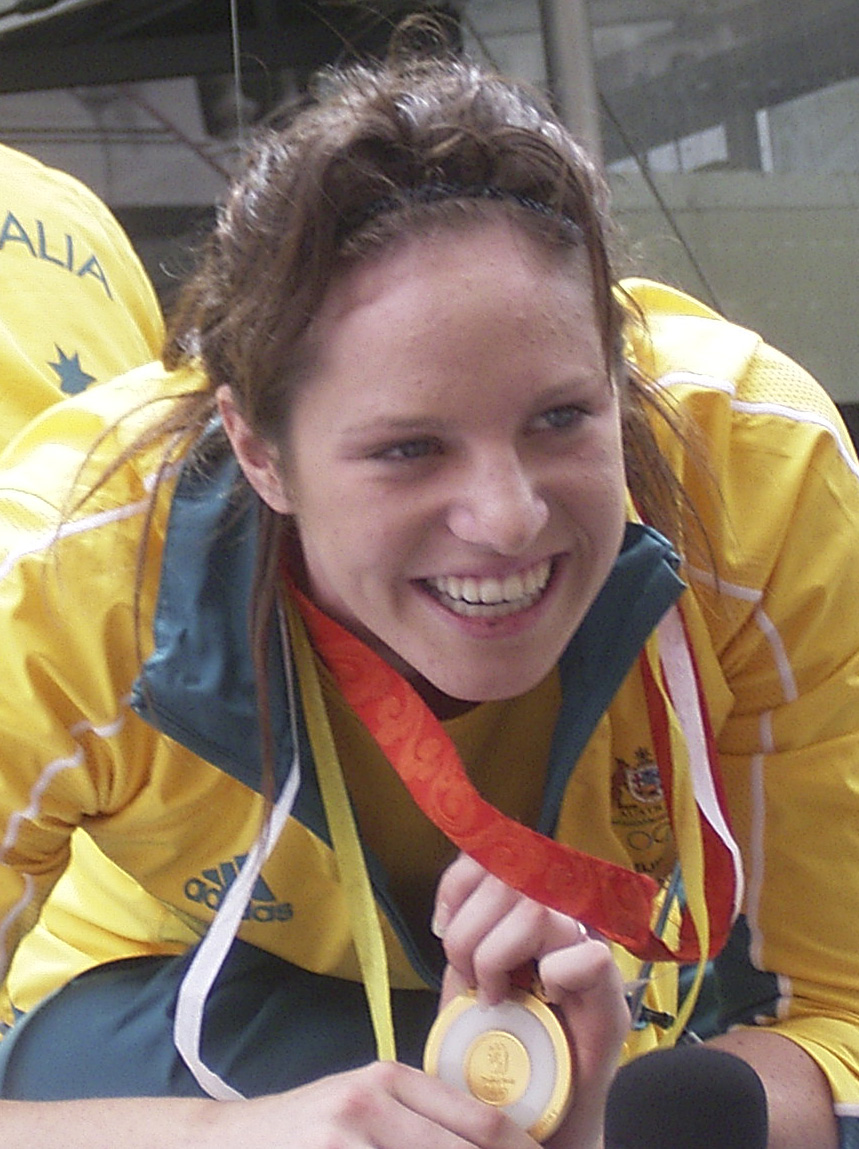
Emily Seebohm, winner of the women's 50 m and 100 m backstroke and 100 m individual medley at the Sydney leg of the 2008 World Cup.

Meet	Men			Women		
Meet	Winner	Nationality	Time	Winner	Nationality	Time
Belo Horizonte	Randall Bal	United States	23.87	Fabíola Molina	Brazil	27.60
Durban	Randall Bal	United States	23.64	Fabíola Molina	Brazil	27.39
Sydney	Robert Hurley	Australia	23.24 WR	Emily Seebohm	Australia	27.21
Singapore	Randall Bal	United States	23.35	Sophie Edington	Australia	27.56
Moscow	Robert Hurley	Australia	23.54	Fabíola Molina	Brazil	27.34
Stockholm	Peter Marshall	United States	23.05 WR	Sanja Jovanović	Croatia	27.16
Berlin	Randall Bal	United States	22.87 WR	Sanja Jovanović	Croatia	27.19

==== 100 m backstroke ====
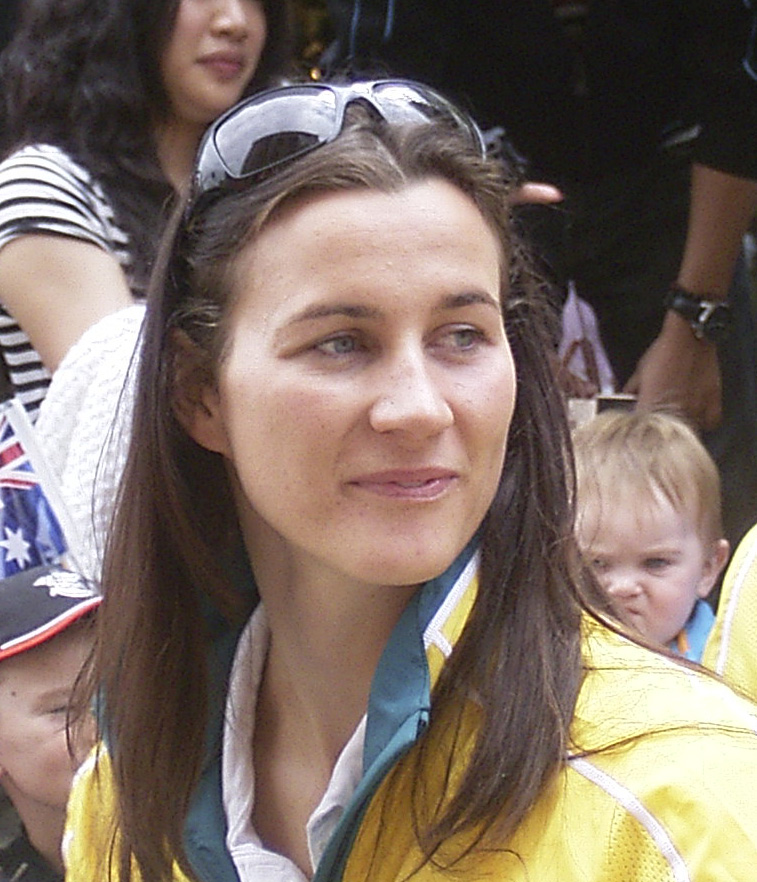
Sophie Edington, winner of the women's 50 m and 100 m backstroke at the Singapore meet.

Meet	Men			Women		
Meet	Winner	Nationality	Time	Winner	Nationality	Time
Belo Horizonte	Stanislav Donets	Russia	50.82	Fabíola Molina	Brazil	59.07
Durban	Randall Bal	United States	50.88	Fabíola Molina	Brazil	59.15
Sydney	Stanislav Donets	Russia	50.75	Emily Seebohm	Australia	57.91
Singapore	Robert Hurley	Australia	50.28 WC	Sophie Edington	Australia	59.02
Moscow	Robert Hurley	Australia	50.51	Anastasia Zuyeva	Russia	58.81
Stockholm	Peter Marshall	United States	49.94 WR	Fabíola Molina	Brazil	58.67
Berlin	Peter Marshall	United States	49.63 WR	Daniela Samulski	Germany	58.03

==== 200 m backstroke ====
Meet	Men			Women		
Meet	Winner	Nationality	Time	Winner	Nationality	Time
Belo Horizonte	Randall Bal	United States	1:54.11	Carolina Colorado	Colombia	2:09.12
Durban	George Du Rand	South Africa	1:51.82	Melissa Ingram	New Zealand	2:04.98
Sydney	Robert Hurley	Australia	1:52.39	Melissa Ingram	New Zealand	2:04.75
Singapore	Ashley Delaney	Australia	1:52.31	Melissa Ingram	New Zealand	2:05.63
Moscow	Ryosuke Irie	Japan	1:52.61	Melissa Ingram	New Zealand	2:04.93
Stockholm	Ryosuke Irie	Japan	1:51.71	Melissa Ingram	New Zealand	2:04.88
Berlin	Ryosuke Irie	Japan	1:51.34	Melissa Ingram	New Zealand	2:04.31

==== 50 m breaststroke ====
Meet	Men			Women		
Meet	Winner	Nationality	Time	Winner	Nationality	Time
Belo Horizonte	Christian Sprenger	Australia	26.89	Valentina Artemyeva	Russia	30.78
Durban	Cameron van der Burgh	South Africa	26.45	Suzaan van Biljon	South Africa	32.42
Sydney	Christian Sprenger	Australia	26.93	Jade Edmistone	Australia	30.43
Singapore	Cameron van der Burgh	South Africa	26.37	Tara Kirk	United States	30.78
Moscow	Cameron van der Burgh	South Africa	26.08 WR	Valentina Artemyeva	Russia	29.86 WC
Stockholm	Cameron van der Burgh	South Africa	25.94 WR	Sarah Katsoulis	Australia	30.37
Berlin	Cameron van der Burgh	South Africa	26.05	Tara Kirk	United States	30.43

==== 100 m breaststroke ====
Meet	Men			Women		
Meet	Winner	Nationality	Time	Winner	Nationality	Time
Belo Horizonte	Christian Sprenger	Australia	58.19	Tara Kirk	United States	1:06.71
Durban	Cameron van der Burgh	South Africa	57.99	Suzaan van Biljon	South Africa	1:08.77
Sydney	Christian Sprenger	Australia	58.47	Sarah Katsoulis	Australia	1:05.79
Singapore	Cameron van der Burgh	South Africa	58.19	Sarah Katsoulis	Australia	1:05.70
Moscow	Cameron van der Burgh	South Africa	56.88 WR	Valentina Artemyeva	Russia	1:04.71
Stockholm	Cameron van der Burgh	South Africa	57.06	Sarah Katsoulis	Australia	1:04.84
Berlin	Cameron van der Burgh	South Africa	57.32	Sarah Katsoulis	Australia	1:05.07

==== 200 m breaststroke ====
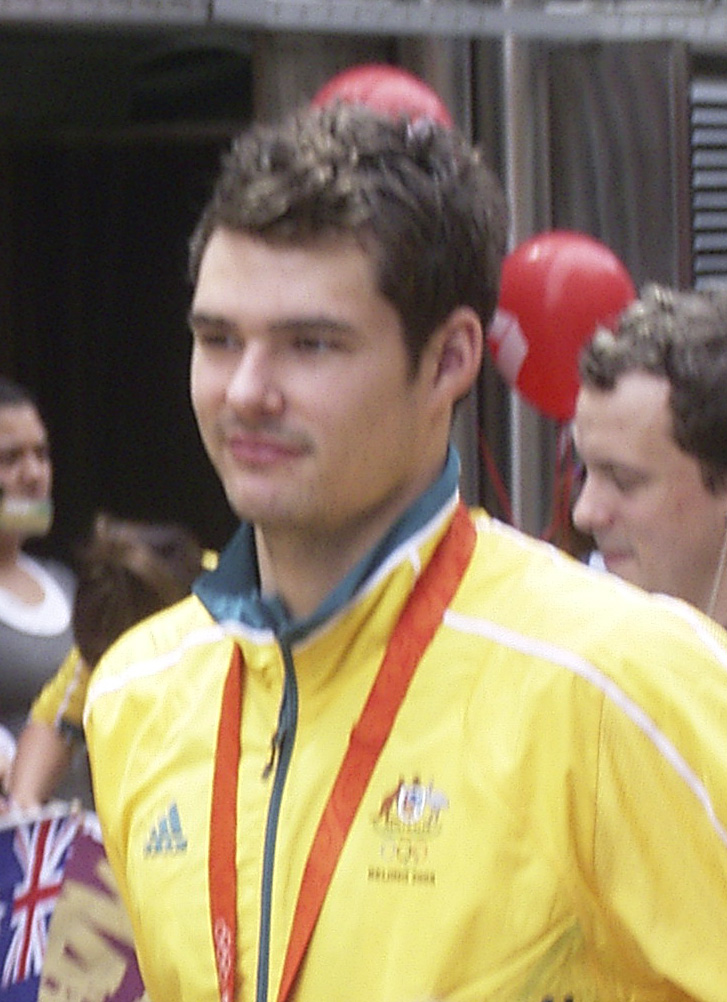
Christian Sprenger, winner of nine World Cup titles in 2008, including the men's 200 m breaststroke at each of the first five meets.

Meet	Men			Women		
Meet	Winner	Nationality	Time	Winner	Nationality	Time
Belo Horizonte	Christian Sprenger	Australia	2:07.58	Tara Kirk	United States	2:27.00
Durban	Christian Sprenger	Australia	2:06.07	Kathryn Meaklim	South Africa	2:24.49
Sydney	Christian Sprenger	Australia	2:06.43	Kathryn Meaklim	South Africa	2:23.86
Singapore	Christian Sprenger	Australia	2:05.48	Joline Höstman	Sweden	2:23.21
Moscow	Christian Sprenger	Australia	2:05.75	Olga Detenyuk	Russia	2:21.70
Stockholm	Igor Borysik	Ukraine	2:05.68	Kathryn Meaklim	South Africa	2:22.07
Berlin	Igor Borysik	Ukraine	2:05.77	Sarah Katsoulis	Australia	2:23.09

==== 50 m butterfly ====
Meet	Men			Women		
Meet	Winner	Nationality	Time	Winner	Nationality	Time
Belo Horizonte	Nicholas Santos	Brazil	23.06	Marieke Guehrer	Australia	25.63
Durban	Neil Watson	South Africa	23.81	Marieke Guehrer	Australia	25.56
Sydney	Matt Jaukovic	Australia	22.50 WR	Marieke Guehrer	Australia	25.46
Singapore	Matt Jaukovic	Australia	22.82	Marieke Guehrer	Australia	25.56
Moscow	Matt Jaukovic	Australia	23.12	Therese Alshammar	Sweden	25.53
Stockholm	Matt Jaukovic	Australia	22.85	Therese Alshammar	Sweden	25.31 WR
Berlin	Matt Jaukovic	Australia	22.58	Marieke Guehrer	Australia	24.99 WR

==== 100 m butterfly ====
Meet	Men			Women		
Meet	Winner	Nationality	Time	Winner	Nationality	Time
Belo Horizonte	Evgeny Korotyshkin	Russia	50.86	Marieke Guehrer	Australia	57.51
Durban	Garth Tune	South Africa	52.19	Marieke Guehrer	Australia	57.03
Sydney	Matt Jaukovic	Australia	50.50	Marieke Guehrer	Australia	56.88
Singapore	Evgeny Korotyshkin	Russia	50.84	Tao Li	Singapore	56.85
Moscow	Matt Jaukovic	Australia	50.68	Marieke Guehrer	Australia	56.97
Stockholm	Evgeny Korotyshkin	Russia	50.22	Tao Li	Singapore	56.87
Berlin	Evgeny Korotyshkin	Russia	49.74 WC	Tao Li	Singapore	56.28 WC

==== 200 m butterfly ====
Meet	Men			Women		
Meet	Winner	Nationality	Time	Winner	Nationality	Time
Belo Horizonte	Kaio de Almeida	Brazil	1:56.74	Mandy Loots	South Africa	2:09.78
Durban	Sebastien Rousseau	South Africa	1:55.73	Mandy Loots	South Africa	2:07.84
Sydney	Chris Wright	Australia	1:53.37	Kathryn Meaklim	South Africa	2:08.85
Sydney	Nick D'Arcy	Australia	1:53.37	Kathryn Meaklim	South Africa	2:08.85
Singapore	Chris Wright	Australia	1:54.38	Amy Smith	Australia	2:07.39
Moscow	Nikolay Skvortsov	Russia	1:52.90	Amy Smith	Australia	2:06.64
Stockholm	Nikolay Skvortsov	Russia	1:52.33	Petra Granlund	Sweden	2:06.44
Berlin	Nikolay Skvortsov	Russia	1:51.78	Petra Granlund	Sweden	2:06.00

==== 100 m individual medley ====
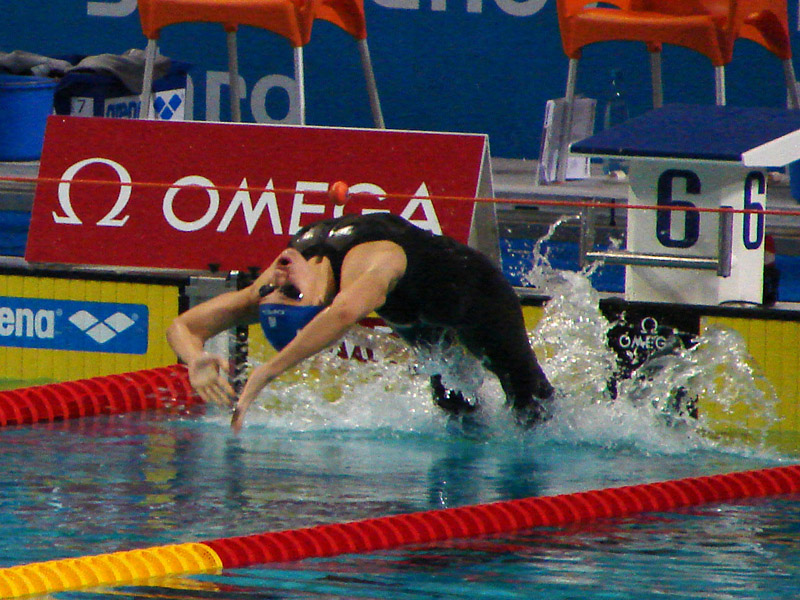
Hanna-Maria Seppälä, winner of the women's 100 m freestyle and 100 m individual medley at Stockholm.

Meet	Men			Women		
Meet	Winner	Nationality	Time	Winner	Nationality	Time
Belo Horizonte	Thiago Pereira	Brazil	53.75	Fabíola Molina	Brazil	1:01.52
Durban	Darian Townsend	South Africa	53.37	Fabíola Molina	Brazil	1:01.31
Sydney	Oussama Mellouli	Tunisia	53.84	Emily Seebohm	Australia	1:00.39
Singapore	Thiago Pereira	Brazil	52.74	Svetlana Karpeeva	Russia	1:01.61
Moscow	Darian Townsend	South Africa	53.97	Olga Klyuchnikova	Russia	1:01.37
Stockholm	Oussama Mellouli	Tunisia	52.78	Hanna-Maria Seppälä	Finland	59.07
Berlin	Darian Townsend	South Africa	51.80	Tara Kirk	United States	1:00.88

==== 200 m individual medley ====
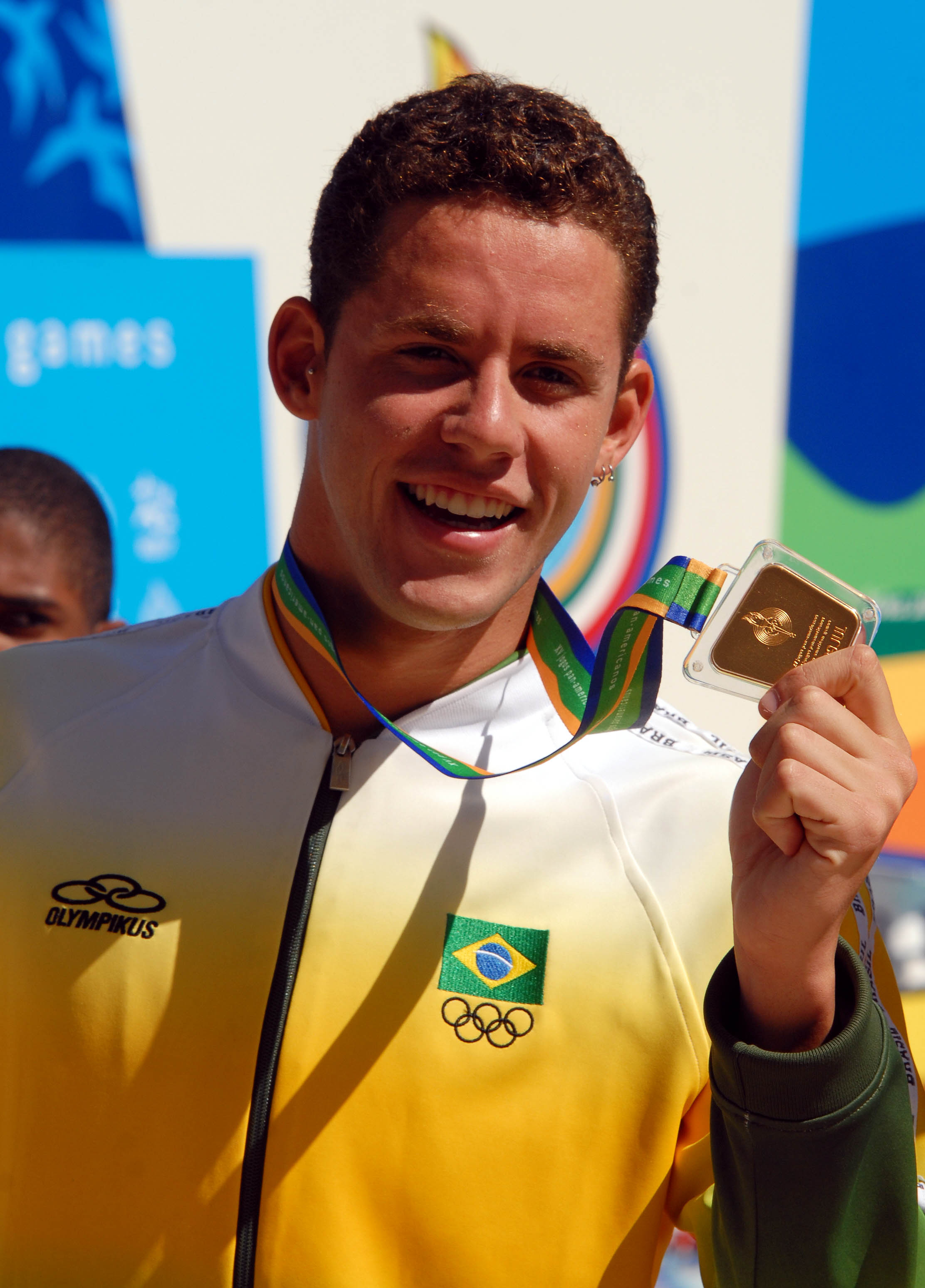
Thiago Pereira, winner of the men's 100 m and 200 m individual medley at both Belo Horizonte and Singapore.

Meet	Men			Women		
Meet	Winner	Nationality	Time	Winner	Nationality	Time
Belo Horizonte	Thiago Pereira	Brazil	1:56.33	Kathryn Meaklim	South Africa	2:12.50
Durban	Oussama Mellouli	Tunisia	1:56.73	Kathryn Meaklim	South Africa	2:10.09
Sydney	Oussama Mellouli	Tunisia	1:56.30	Kathryn Meaklim	South Africa	2:10.03
Singapore	Thiago Pereira	Brazil	1:53.76	Kathryn Meaklim	South Africa	2:10.59
Moscow	Oussama Mellouli	Tunisia	1:55.10	Tomoya Fukuda	Japan	2:11.25
Stockholm	Darian Townsend	South Africa	1:54.96	Kathryn Meaklim	South Africa	2:09.54
Berlin	Oussama Mellouli	Tunisia	1:52.41 WC	Theresa Michalak	Germany	2:10.92

==== 400 m individual medley ====
Meet	Men			Women		
Meet	Winner	Nationality	Time	Winner	Nationality	Time
Belo Horizonte	Oussama Mellouli	Tunisia	4:17.68	Kathryn Meaklim	South Africa	4:38.11
Durban	Oussama Mellouli	Tunisia	4:08.84	Jessica Pengelly	South Africa	4:30.45
Sydney	Oussama Mellouli	Tunisia	4:06.47	Kathryn Meaklim	South Africa	4:31.52
Singapore	Oussama Mellouli	Tunisia	4:02.93	Kathryn Meaklim	South Africa	4:32.31
Moscow	Oussama Mellouli	Tunisia	4:07.97	Svetlana Karpeeva	Russia	4:41.26
Stockholm	Chris Christensen	Denmark	4:11.47	Kathryn Meaklim	South Africa	4:27.21 WC
Berlin	Robert Margalis	United States	4:13.30	Kathryn Meaklim	South Africa	4:29.41

Legend: WR – World record; (WR) – World record when swum (earning bonus World Cup points); WC – World Cup record; (WC) – World Cup record when swum

== See also ==
- List of World Cup records in swimming
- 2008 in swimming
