= 50 metres butterfly =

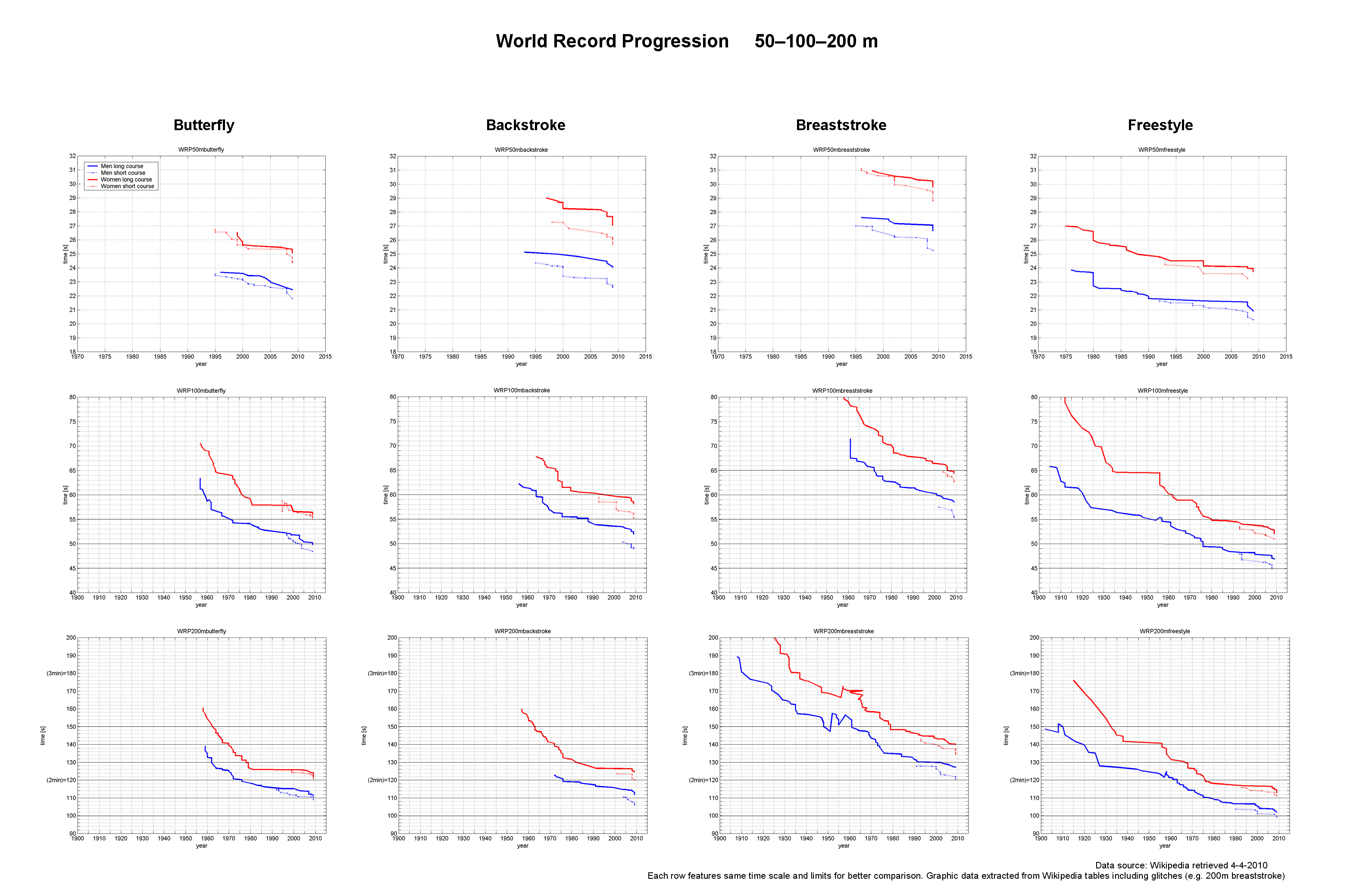
Graphs of the progression of the World Records in all four strokes (50m, 100m and 200m distances).

The 50 metres butterfly is an event in competitive swimming. World records are ratified by World Aquatics (formerly FINA). The current long course world record holders are Ukraine's Andriy Govorov and Sweden's Sarah Sjöström, while the current short course world record holders are Russia's Egor Kornev and the US' Gretchen Walsh.

The men's and women's events have been contested at the World Aquatics Championships since 2001; the current world champions (long course) are France's Maxime Grousset, and Walsh. The men's and women's events have been contested at the World Aquatics Swimming Championships (25m) since 1999; the current world champions (short course) are Switzerland's Noè Ponti, and Walsh.

== World record progression ==
=== Men long course ===
#	Time		Name	Nationality	Date	Meet	Location	Ref
WB	23.68		Denis Pankratov	Russia	10 Aug 1996	Meet of Champions	Mulhouse, France	
1	23.60		Geoff Huegill	Australia	14 May 2000	Australia Championships	Sydney, Australia	
2	23.44	sf	Geoff Huegill	Australia	27 Jul 2001	World Championships	Fukuoka, Japan	
3	23.43		Matt Welsh	Australia	21 Jul 2003	World Championships	Barcelona, Spain	
4	23.30		Ian Crocker	United States	29 Feb 2004	Big 12 Time Trials	Austin, United States	
5	23.01	sf	Roland Schoeman	South Africa	24 Jul 2005	World Championships	Montreal, Canada	
6	22.96		Roland Schoeman	South Africa	25 Jul 2005	World Championships	Montreal, Canada	
7	22.43	sf	Rafael Muñoz	Spain	5 April 2009	Spanish Championships	Málaga, Spain	
8	22.27		Andriy Govorov	Ukraine	1 July 2018	Sette Colli Trophy	Rome, Italy	

Legend: # – Record awaiting ratification by FINA; e – equalled existing record;
Records not set in finals: h – heat; sf – semifinal; r – relay 1st leg; rh – relay heat 1st leg; b – B final; † – en route to final mark; so – swim-off; tt – time trial

=== Men short course ===
#	Time		Name	Nationality	Date	Meet	Location	Ref
1	24.11		Marcel Gery	Canada	23 February 1990	World Cup	Leicester, United Kingdom	
2	24.05		Nils Rudolph	Germany	29 March 1991	World Cup	Sheffield, United Kingdom	
3	23.72		Mark Foster	Great Britain	13 February 1993	World Cup	Gelsenkirchen, Germany	
3	23.72	=	Mark Foster	Great Britain	19 March 1994	World Cup	Gelsenkirchen, Germany	
5	23.68		Mark Foster	Great Britain	22 March 1994	World Cup	Sheffield, United Kingdom	
6	23.55		Mark Foster	Great Britain	11 February 1995	World Cup	Sheffield, United Kingdom	
7	23.45		Mark Foster	Great Britain	15 December 1995	-	Sheffield, United Kingdom	
8	23.35		Denis Pankratov	Russia	8 February 1997	World Cup	Paris, France	
9	23.30		Miloš Milošević	Croatia	12 December 1998	European Championships	Sheffield, United Kingdom	
10	23.21		Michael Klim	Australia	5 September 1999	Australian Championships	Canberra, Australia	
11	23.19	h	Lars Frölander	Sweden	19 March 2000	World Championships	Athens, Greece	
12	23.11	tt	Michael Klim	Australia	19 June 2000	AIS Meet	Canberra, Australia	
13	22.87		Mark Foster	Great Britain	17 January 2001	World Cup	Sheffield, United Kingdom	
14	22.84		Geoff Huegill	Australia	7 December 2001	World Cup	Melbourne, Australia	
14	22.84	=	Geoff Huegill	Australia	22 January 2002	World Cup	Stockholm, Sweden	
16	22.74	h	Geoff Huegill	Australia	26 January 2002	World Cup	Berlin, Germany	
17	22.71		Ian Crocker	United States	10 October 2004	World Championships	Indianapolis, United States	
18	22.60		Kaio de Almeida	Brazil	17 December 2005	Brazilian Championships	Santos, Brazil	
19	22.50		Matt Jaukovic	Australia	25 October 2008	World Cup	Sydney, Australia	
20	22.29		Amaury Leveaux	France	6 December 2008	French Championships	Angers, France	
21	22.18	h	Amaury Leveaux	France	14 December 2008	European Championships	Rijeka, Croatia	
22	22.06		Steffen Deibler	Germany	24 October 2009	International Festival	Aachen, Germany	
23	21.80		Steffen Deibler	Germany	14 November 2009	World Cup	Berlin, Germany	
24	21.75		Nicholas Santos	Brazil	6 October 2018	World Cup	Budapest, Hungary	
24	21.75	=	Szebasztián Szabó	Hungary	6 November 2021	European Championships	Kazan, Russia	
26	21.67	h	Noè Ponti	Switzerland	20 October 2024	World Cup	Shanghai, China	
27	21.50	h	Noè Ponti	Switzerland	2 November 2024	World Cup	Singapore	
28	21.43	sf	Noè Ponti	Switzerland	10 December 2024	World Championships	Budapest, Hungary	
29	21.32		Noè Ponti	Switzerland	11 December 2024	World Championships	Budapest, Hungary	
30	21.28		Egor Kornev	Russia	10 October 2026	World Cup	Tashkent, Uzbekistan	

Legend: # – Record awaiting ratification by FINA; e – equalled existing record;
Records not set in finals: h – heat; sf – semifinal; r – relay 1st leg; rh – relay heat 1st leg; b – B final; † – en route to final mark; so – swim-off; tt – time trial

=== Women long course ===
#	Time		Name	Nationality	Date	Meet	Location	Ref
1	26.54		Inge de Bruijn	Netherlands	18 Jun 1999	Netherlands Championships	Amersfoort, Netherlands	
2	26.39		Anna-Karin Kammerling	Sweden	1 Jul 1999	Sweden Championships	Halmstad, Sweden	
3	26.29		Anna-Karin Kammerling	Sweden	27 Jul 1999	European Championships	Istanbul, Turkey	
4	25.83	h	Inge de Bruijn	Netherlands	20 May 2000	Mare Nostrum	Monte Carlo, Monaco	
5	25.64	h	Inge de Bruijn	Netherlands	26 May 2000	Super Speedo Grand Prix	Sheffield, United Kingdom	
6	25.57		Anna-Karin Kammerling	Sweden	30 Jul 2002	European Championships	Berlin, Germany	
7	25.46		Therese Alshammar	Sweden	13 Jun 2007	Mare Nostrum	Barcelona, Spain	
8	25.33		Marleen Veldhuis	Netherlands	19 April 2009	Swim Cup Amsterdam	Amsterdam, Netherlands	
9	25.28	sf	Marleen Veldhuis	Netherlands	31 July 2009	World Championships	Rome, Italy	
10	25.07	sf	Therese Alshammar	Sweden	31 July 2009	World Championships	Rome, Italy	
11	24.43		Sarah Sjöström	Sweden	5 July 2014	Swedish Championships	Borås, Sweden	

Legend: # – Record awaiting ratification by FINA; e – equalled existing record;
Records not set in finals: h – heat; sf – semifinal; r – relay 1st leg; rh – relay heat 1st leg; b – B final; † – en route to final mark; so – swim-off; tt – time trial

=== Women short course ===
#	Time		Name	Nationality	Date	Meet	Location	Ref
1	27.54		Christiane Sievert	East Germany	10 Feb 1990	World Cup	Bonn, Germany	
2	27.25		Inge de Bruijn	Netherlands	6 Dec 1991	European Sprint Championships	Gelsenkirchen, Germany	
3	27.11		Kristin Topham	Canada	20 Feb 1992	Canadian Winter National Championships	Winnipeg, Canada	
4	26.73		Amy Van Dyken	United States	1 Feb 1995	World Cup	Espoo, Finland	
5	26.56	h	Angela Kennedy	Australia	12 Feb 1995	World Cup	Sheffield, United Kingdom	
6	26.55	†	Misty Hyman	United States	19 Apr 1997	World Championships	Gothenburg, Sweden	
7	26.48		Jenny Thompson	United States	29 Nov 1997	Canada Open	Toronto, Canada	
8	26.05	h	Jenny Thompson	United States	2 Dec 1998	World Cup	College Station, United States	
9	26.00		Jenny Thompson	United States	18 Nov 1999	World Cup	College Park, United States	
10	25.64		Anna-Karin Kammerling	Sweden	10 Dec 1999	European Championships	Lisbon, Portugal	
11	25.60		Anna-Karin Kammerling	Sweden	15 Dec 2000	European Championships	Valencia, Spain	
12	25.36		Anna-Karin Kammerling	Sweden	25 Jan 2001	World Cup	Stockholm, Sweden	
13	25.33		Anna-Karin Kammerling	Sweden	12 Mar 2005	Swedish Championships	Gothenburg, Sweden	
14	25.32		Felicity Galvez	Australia	11 Apr 2008	World Championships	Manchester, United Kingdom	
15	25.31		Therese Alshammar	Sweden	12 Nov 2008	World Cup	Stockholm, Sweden	
16	24.99		Marieke Guehrer	Australia	15 Nov 2008	World Cup	Berlin, Germany	
17	24.75		Therese Alshammar	Sweden	17 Oct 2009	World Cup	Durban, South Africa	
18	24.46		Therese Alshammar	Sweden	11 Nov 2009	World Cup	Stockholm, Sweden	
19	24.38		Therese Alshammar	Sweden	22 Nov 2009	World Cup	Singapore	
20	24.02	h	Gretchen Walsh	United States	10 December 2024	World Championships	Budapest, Hungary	
21	23.94	sf	Gretchen Walsh	United States	10 December 2024	World Championships	Budapest, Hungary	
22	23.72		Gretchen Walsh	United States	11 October 2025	World Cup	Carmel, United States	

Legend: # – Record awaiting ratification by FINA; e – equalled existing record;
Records not set in finals: h – heat; sf – semifinal; r – relay 1st leg; rh – relay heat 1st leg; b – B final; † – en route to final mark; so – swim-off; tt – time trial

== All-time top 25 ==
Tables show data for two definitions of "Top 25" - the top 25 50 m butterfly times and the top 25 athletes:
- denotes top performance for athletes in the top 25 50 m butterfly times
- denotes lesser performances, still in the top 25 50 m butterfly times, by repeat athletes
- denotes top performance (only) for other top 25 athletes who fall outside the top 25 50 m butterfly times

=== Men long course ===
- Correct as of August 2026

Ath.#	Perf.#	Time	Athlete	Nation	Date	Place	Ref.
1	1	22.27	Andriy Govorov	Ukraine	1 July 2018	Rome	
2	2	22.35	Caeleb Dressel	United States	22 July 2019	Gwangju	
3	3	22.36	Egor Kornev	Russia	10 August 2026	Paris	
4	4	22.43	Rafael Muñoz	Spain	5 April 2009	Málaga	
	5	22.45	Muñoz #2		5 April 2009	Málaga	
	6	22.48	Muñoz #3		22 April 2009	Montpellier	
	6	22.48	Govorov #2		7 August 2018	Glasgow	
5	6	22.48	Maxime Grousset	France	28 July 2025	Singapore	
	9	22.49	Muñoz #4		22 April 2009	Montpellier	
	9	22.49	Grousset #2		10 August 2026	Paris	
	9	22.49	Grousset #3		10 August 2026	Paris	
6	12	22.51	Noè Ponti	Switzerland	28 July 2025	Singapore	
	13	22.52	Kornev #2		11 August 2026	Paris	
	14	22.53	Govorov #3		16 June 2018	Monaco	
	14	22.53	Ponti #2		10 August 2026	Paris	
	16	22.54	Grousset #4		11 August 2026	Paris	
	17	22.57	Dressel #2		21 July 2019	Gwangju	
	17	22.57	Dressel #3		19 June 2022	Budapest	
	19	22.59	Kornev #3		10 June 2026	Kazan	
7	19	22.59	Ilya Kharun	(Note: Ilya Kharun initially represented Canada before announcing in January 2026 his intention to switch sporting citizenship to the US. Under World Aquatics rules, athletes must cease representing their former nation for 12 months before they can represent their new nation; Kharun becomes eligible to represent the US in October 2026. The attributed nation (or lack thereof) indicates which team he represented at the time.)	29 July 2026	Irvine	
8	21	22.60	Nicholas Santos	Brazil	11 May 2019	Budapest	
	22	22.61	Santos #2		3 May 2017	Rio de Janeiro	
	22	22.61	Grousset #5		27 July 2025	Singapore	
9	24	22.62	Oleg Kostin	Russia	19 April 2023	Kazan	
	25	22.64	Kharun #2		24 May 2026	Monaco	
10		22.67	Milorad Čavić	Serbia	27 July 2009	Rome	
10		22.67	Thomas Ceccon	Italy	28 July 2025	Singapore	
12		22.68	Diogo Ribeiro	Portugal	10 August 2026	Paris	
12		22.68	Hryhory Pekarski	Belarus	11 August 2026	Paris	
14		22.69	Sean Niewold	Netherlands	2 July 2026	Eindhoven	
15		22.70	Henrique Martins	Brazil	26 June 2017	Belo Horizonte	
16		22.71	Luca Armbruster	Germany	10 August 2026	Paris	
17		22.72	Nyls Korstanje	Netherlands	26 May 2025	London	
18		22.73	Matt Targett	Australia	27 July 2009	Rome	
18		22.73	Ben Armbruster	Australia	29 July 2026	Glasgow	
18		22.73	Kyle Chalmers	Australia	29 July 2026	Glasgow	
21		22.74	Ben Proud	Great Britain	27 July 2025	Singapore	
22		22.75	Kristóf Milák	Hungary	10 August 2026	Paris	
23		22.76	César Cielo	Brazil	24 April 2012	Rio de Janeiro	
24		22.79	Michael Andrew	United States	19 June 2022	Budapest	
24		22.79	Dare Rose	United States	23 July 2023	Fukuoka	
24		22.79	Stergios Bilas	Greece	10 August 2026	Paris	

=== Men short course ===
- Correct as of November 2026

Ath.#	Perf.#	Time	Athlete	Nation	Date	Place	Ref.
1	1	21.28	Egor Kornev	Russia	10 October 2026	Tashkent	
2	2	21.32	Noè Ponti	Switzerland	11 December 2024	Budapest	
	3	21.43	Ponti #2		10 December 2024	Budapest	
3	4	21.46	Ilya Kharun	United States	31 October 2026	Westmont	
	5	21.50	Ponti #3		2 November 2024	Singapore	
	6	21.51	Ponti #4		2 December 2025	Lublin	
	7	21.53	Ponti #5		10 December 2024	Budapest	
	8	21.54	Ponti #6		3 December 2025	Lublin	
	9	21.61	Kharun #2		31 October 2026	Westmont	
4	10	21.62	Nyls Korstanje	Netherlands	10 December 2024	Budapest	
4	10	21.62	Caeleb Dressel	United States	31 October 2026	Westmont	
	12	21.64	Ponti #7		2 November 2024	Singapore	
	12	21.64	Kornev #2		3 October 2026	Baku	
	14	21.65	Ponti #8		12 April 2025	Uster	
	15	21.67	Ponti #9		20 October 2024	Shanghai	
	15	21.67	Kharun #3		11 December 2024	Budapest	
	17	21.68	Ponti #10		20 October 2024	Shanghai	
	17	21.68	Korstanje #2		11 December 2024	Budapest	
	19	21.69	Kharun #4		19 October 2025	Westmont	
	19	21.69	Kornev #3		7 November 2026	Saint Petersburg	
	21	21.73	Kornev #4		7 November 2025	Kazan	
	22	21.74	Korstanje #3		2 November 2024	Singapore	
6	23	21.75	Nicholas Santos	Brazil	6 October 2018	Budapest	
6	23	21.75	Szebasztián Szabó	Hungary	6 November 2021	Kazan	
6	23	21.75	Tyler Ray	United States	31 October 2026	Westmont	
9		21.80	Steffen Deibler	Germany	14 November 2009	Berlin	
10		21.86	Guilherme Caribé	Brazil	3 September 2026	São Paulo	
11		21.87	Roland Schoeman	South Africa	14 November 2009	Berlin	
12		21.90	Ben Armbruster	Australia	29 September 2025	Sydney	
13		21.91	Joshua Liendo	Canada	25 October 2025	Toronto	
14		21.93	Teong Tzen Wei	Singapore	25 October 2025	Toronto	
15		21.95	Chad le Clos	South Africa	6 December 2014	Doha	
15		21.95	Maxime Grousset	France	2 December 2025	Lublin	
17		21.96	Sun Jiajun	China	24 September 2024	Wuhan	
17		21.96	Isaac Cooper	Australia	10 October 2026	Tashkent	
19		21.98	Dylan Carter	Trinidad and Tobago	20 December 2021	Abu Dhabi	
19		21.98	Oleg Kostin	Russia	7 November 2026	Saint Petersburg	
21		21.99	Tom Shields	United States	9 October 2021	Budapest	
21		21.99	Marius Kusch	Germany	10 December 2024	Budapest	
23		22.01	Michele Busa	Italy	11 December 2024	Budapest	
24		22.02	Matteo Rivolta	Italy	20 December 2021	Abu Dhabi	
25		22.05	Hryhory Pekarski	Belarus	10 December 2024	Budapest	

=== Women long course ===
- Correct as of August 2026

Ath.#	Perf.#	Time	Athlete	Nation	Date	Place	Ref.
1	1	24.43	Sarah Sjöström	Sweden	5 July 2014	Borås	
2	2	24.51	Gretchen Walsh	United States	26 June 2026	Rome	
	3	24.60	Sjöström #2		29 July 2017	Budapest	
	4	24.63	Sjöström #3		17 February 2024	Doha	
	5	24.65	Walsh #2		12 August 2026	Irvine	
	6	24.66	Walsh #3		4 June 2025	Indianapolis	
	7	24.69	Sjöström #4		5 April 2015	Eindhoven	
	8	24.73	Sjöström #5		21 June 2024	Rome	
	9	24.74	Sjöström #6		28 July 2023	Fukuoka	
	10	24.76	Sjöström #7		14 June 2017	Barcelona	
	11	24.77	Sjöström #8		29 July 2023	Fukuoka	
	12	24.79	Sjöström #9		26 July 2019	Gwangju	
	13	24.83	Walsh #4		2 August 2025	Singapore	
	14	24.87	Sjöström #10		18 August 2014	Berlin	
	15	24.88	Sjöström #11		16 February 2024	Doha	
	16	24.89	Sjöström #12		21 May 2023	Monaco	
	17	24.90	Sjöström #13		11 June 2017	Monaco	
	18	24.91	Walsh #5		26 June 2026	Rome	
	18	24.91	Walsh #6		12 August 2026	Irvine	
	20	24.92	Sjöström #14		25 April 2024	Stockholm	
	21	24.93	Walsh #7		2 May 2025	Fort Lauderdale	
	22	24.95	Sjöström #15		18 June 2017	Canet-en-Roussillon	
	22	24.95	Sjöström #16		24 June 2022	Budapest	
	22	24.95	Sjöström #17		2 June 2024	Monaco	
	25	24.96	Sjöström #18		8 August 2015	Kazan	
	25	24.96	Sjöström #19		8 April 2017	Stockholm	
	25	24.96	Sjöström #20		13 August 2022	Rome	
3		24.99	Kate Douglass	United States	12 August 2026	Irvine	
4		25.05	Zhang Yufei	China	29 July 2023	Fukuoka	
5		25.07	Therese Alshammar	Sweden	31 July 2009	Rome	
6		25.11	Rikako Ikee	Japan	10 June 2018	Canet-en-Roussillon	
7		25.12	Roos Vanotterdijk	Belgium	12 August 2026	Paris	
8		25.17	Mélanie Henique	France	19 June 2021	Chartres	
9		25.20	Fran Halsall	Great Britain	24 July 2014	Glasgow	
10		25.23	Taylor Ruck	Canada	12 August 2026	Irvine	
11		25.24	Jeanette Ottesen	Denmark	3 August 2013	Barcelona	
11		25.24	Ranomi Kromowidjojo	Netherlands	13 March 2021	Amsterdam	
13		25.28	Marleen Veldhuis	Netherlands	31 July 2009	Rome	
14		25.30	Arina Surkova	Russia	19 April 2023	Kazan	
15		25.31	Holly Barratt	Australia	16 August 2019	Singapore	
15		25.31	Alexandria Perkins	Australia	2 August 2025	Singapore	
17		25.33	Marie Wattel	France	13 August 2022	Rome	
17		25.33	Torri Huske	United States	28 June 2023	Indianapolis	
19		25.37	Lu Ying	China	8 August 2015	Kazan	
20		25.38	Farida Osman	Egypt	24 June 2022	Budapest	
21		25.39	Erin Gallagher	South Africa	1 August 2025	Singapore	
22		25.43	Claire Curzan	United States	24 June 2022	Budapest	
22		25.43	Hazel Ouwehand	New Zealand	23 May 2025	Auckland	
24		25.47	Cate Campbell	Australia	1 March 2018	Gold Coast	
25		25.48	Marieke Guehrer	Australia	1 August 2009	Rome	
25		25.48	Kelsi Dahlia	United States	29 July 2017	Budapest	
25		25.48	Kelsi Dahlia	United States	26 July 2018	Irvine	
25		25.48	Kelsi Dahlia	United States	27 July 2019	Gwangju	
25		25.48	Wu Qingfeng	China	20 June 2026	Hangzhou	

=== Women short course ===
- Correct as of October 2026

Ath.#	Perf.#	Time	Athlete	Nation	Date	Place	Ref.
1	1	23.72	Gretchen Walsh	United States	11 October 2025	Carmel	
	2	23.80	Walsh #2		30 October 2026	Westmont	
	3	23.90	Walsh #3		18 October 2025	Westmont	
	4	23.91	Walsh #4		24 October 2025	Toronto	
	5	23.94	Walsh #5		10 December 2024	Budapest	
	6	24.01	Walsh #6		11 December 2024	Budapest	
	7	24.02	Walsh #7		10 December 2024	Budapest	
	7	24.02	Walsh #8		16 October 2026	Charlottesville	
	9	24.13	Walsh #9		11 October 2025	Carmel	
	10	24.18	Walsh #10		14 December 2024	Budapest	
	11	24.19	Walsh #11		24 October 2025	Toronto	
	12	24.26	Walsh #12		18 October 2025	Westmont	
	13	24.37	Walsh #13		13 December 2024	Budapest	
2	14	24.38	Therese Alshammar	Sweden	22 November 2009	Singapore	
3	15	24.42	Kate Douglass	United States	1 November 2024	Singapore	
4	16	24.43	Béryl Gastaldello	France	11 December 2024	Budapest	
5	17	24.44	Ranomi Kromowidjojo	Netherlands	19 December 2021	Abu Dhabi	
	18	24.46	Alshammar #2		11 November 2009	Stockholm	
	19	24.47	Kromowidjojo #2		14 December 2018	Hangzhou	
	20	24.49	Kromowidjojo #3		12 December 2020	Eindhoven	
	20	24.49	Walsh #14		25 October 2025	Toronto	
6	22	24.50	Sarah Sjöström	Sweden	7 November 2021	Kazan	
	23	24.51	Kromowidjojo #4		10 November 2018	Tokyo	
	23	24.51	Sjöström #2		19 December 2021	Abu Dhabi	
	23	24.51	Walsh #15		19 October 2025	Westmont	
7		24.55	Claire Curzan	United States	19 December 2021	Abu Dhabi	
8		24.56	Mélanie Henique	France	5 December 2019	Glasgow	
8		24.56	Roos Vanotterdijk	Belgium	15 October 2026	Astana	
10		24.58	Arina Surkova	Russia	22 November 2023	Saint Petersburg	
11		24.59	Inge Dekker	Netherlands	1 September 2014	Dubai	
12		24.60	Alexandria Perkins	Australia	18 October 2025	Westmont	
13		24.61	Martine Damborg	Denmark	3 December 2025	Lublin	
14		24.64	Torri Huske	United States	14 December 2022	Melbourne	
14		24.64	Maggie Mac Neil	Canada	14 December 2022	Melbourne	
16		24.68	Tessa Giele	Netherlands	10 December 2024	Budapest	
17		24.69	Marieke Guehrer	Australia	15 November 2009	Berlin	
18		24.71	Jeanette Ottesen	Denmark	5 December 2014	Doha	
18		24.71	Rikako Ikee	Japan	13 January 2018	Tokyo	
18		24.71	Zhang Yufei	China	14 December 2022	Melbourne	
21		24.75	Holly Barratt	Australia	29 October 2021	Kazan	
22		24.76	Maaike de Waard	Netherlands	10 December 2024	Budapest	
23		24.80	Madeline Banic	United States	22 November 2020	Budapest	
24		24.86	Kelsi Dahlia	United States	21 November 2021	Eindhoven	
25		24.90	Felicity Galvez	Australia	17 December 2010	Dubai	

== World champions (long course) ==
=== Men ===
Edition	Winner	Time	Notes	Ref.
(Japan) Fukuoka 2001	Geoff Huegill (AUS)	23.50	(Note: Geoff Huegill set a world record of 23.44 in the semifinals.)	
(Spain) Barcelona 2003	Matt Welsh (AUS)	23.43	WR	
(Canada) Montreal 2005	Roland Schoeman (RSA)	22.96	WR	
(Australia) Melbourne 2007	Roland Schoeman (RSA)	23.18		
(Italy) Rome 2009	Milorad Čavić (SRB)	22.67	CR	
(China) Shanghai 2011	César Cielo (BRA)	23.10		
(Spain) Barcelona 2013	César Cielo (BRA)	23.01		
(Russia) Kazan 2015	Florent Manaudou (FRA)	22.97		
(Hungary) Budapest 2017	Ben Proud (GBR)	22.75		
(South Korea) Gwangju 2019	Caeleb Dressel (USA)	22.35	CR	
(Hungary) Budapest 2022	Caeleb Dressel (USA)	22.57		
(Japan) Fukuoka 2023	Thomas Ceccon (ITA)	22.68		
(Qatar) Doha 2024	Diogo Ribeiro (POR)	22.97		
Singapore 2025	Maxime Grousset (FRA)	22.48		

=== Women ===
Edition	Winner	Time	Notes	Ref.
(Japan) Fukuoka 2001	Inge de Bruijn (NED)	25.90	CR	
(Spain) Barcelona 2003	Inge de Bruijn (NED)	25.84	CR	
(Canada) Montreal 2005	Danni Miatke (AUS)	26.11		
(Australia) Melbourne 2007	Therese Alshammar (SWE)	25.91	(Note: Therese Alshammar set a championship record of 25.82 in the semifinals.)	
(Italy) Rome 2009	Marieke Guehrer (AUS)	25.48	(Note: Therese Alshammar set a world record of 25.07 in the semifinals.)	
(China) Shanghai 2011	Inge Dekker (NED)	25.71		
(Spain) Barcelona 2013	Jeanette Ottesen (DEN)	25.24		
(Russia) Kazan 2015	Sarah Sjöström (SWE)	24.96	CR	
(Hungary) Budapest 2017	Sarah Sjöström (SWE)	24.60	CR	
(South Korea) Gwangju 2019	Sarah Sjöström (SWE)	25.02		
(Hungary) Budapest 2022	Sarah Sjöström (SWE)	24.95		
(Japan) Fukuoka 2023	Sarah Sjöström (SWE)	24.77		
(Qatar) Doha 2024	Sarah Sjöström (SWE)	24.63		
Singapore 2025	Gretchen Walsh (USA)	24.83		

== World champions (short course) ==
=== Men ===
Edition	Winner	Time	Notes	Ref.
Hong Kong 1999	Mark Foster (GBR)	23.61	CR	
(Greece) Athens 2000	Mark Foster (GBR)	23.30	(Note: Lars Frölander set a championship record of 23.19 in the heats.)	
(Russia) Moscow 2002	Geoff Huegill (AUS)	22.89	CR	
(United States) Indianapolis 2004	Ian Crocker (USA)	22.71	WR	
(China) Shanghai 2006	Matt Welsh (AUS)	23.05		
(United Kingdom) Manchester 2008	Adam Pine (AUS)	22.78	(Note: Adam Pine set a championship record of 22.70 in the semifinals.)	
(United Arab Emirates) Dubai 2010	Albert Subirats (VEN)	22.40	CR	
(Turkey) Istanbul 2012	Nicholas Santos (BRA)	22.22	CR	
(Qatar) Doha 2014	Chad le Clos (RSA)	21.95	CR	
(Canada) Windsor 2016	Chad le Clos (RSA)	21.98		
(China) Hangzhou 2018	Nicholas Santos (BRA)	21.81	CR	
(United Arab Emirates) Abu Dhabi 2021	Nicholas Santos (BRA)	21.93		
(Australia) Melbourne 2022	Nicholas Santos (BRA)	21.78	CR	
(Hungary) Budapest 2024	Noè Ponti (SUI)	21.32	WR	

=== Women ===
Edition	Winner	Time	Notes	Ref.
Hong Kong 1999	Jenny Thompson (USA)	26.18	(Note: Inge de Bruijn set a world record of 26.16 in the heats.)	
(Greece) Athens 2000	Jenny Thompson (USA)	26.13	CR	
(Russia) Moscow 2002	Anna-Karin Kammerling (SWE)	25.55	CR	
(United States) Indianapolis 2004	Jenny Thompson (USA)	25.89		
(China) Shanghai 2006	Therese Alshammar (SWE)	25.76		
(United Kingdom) Manchester 2008	Felicity Galvez (AUS)	25.32	WR	
(United Arab Emirates) Dubai 2010	Therese Alshammar (SWE)	24.87	CR	
(Turkey) Istanbul 2012	Lu Ying (CHN)	25.14		
(Qatar) Doha 2014	Sarah Sjöström (SWE)	24.58	CR	
(Canada) Windsor 2016	Jeanette Ottesen (DEN)	24.92		
(China) Hangzhou 2018	Ranomi Kromowidjojo (NED)	24.47	CR	
(United Arab Emirates) Abu Dhabi 2021	Ranomi Kromowidjojo (NED)	24.44	CR	
(Australia) Melbourne 2022	Torri Huske (USA)	24.64		
(Australia) Melbourne 2022	Maggie Mac Neil (CAN)	24.64		
(Hungary) Budapest 2024	Gretchen Walsh (USA)	24.01	(Note: Gretchen Walsh set a world record of 23.94 in the semifinals.)	
