= 2009 FINA Swimming World Cup =

Sport Event

The 2009 FINA Swimming World Cup was a series of five short course (25 m) swimming meets, held in October and November 2009.

== Meets ==
The 2009 World Cup was staged at five venues on three continents, with each meet following a morning heats and evening finals format for all events, with the exception of the 800 m and 1500 m freestyle and 400 m individual medley events which were heat-declared winners. The order of events at each meet was the same. A sixth meet originally scheduled to be held in Rio de Janeiro, Brazil on 23–25 October was cancelled.

Meet	Dates	Location	Results
1	16–17 October	Durban, South Africa	Results
2	6–7 November	Moscow, Russia	Results
3	10–11 November	Stockholm, Sweden	Results
4	14–15 November	Berlin, Germany	Results
5	21–22 November	Singapore	Results

== Results ==
=== Overall World Cup ===
At each meet of the World Cup circuit in 2009, the FINA Points Table was used to rank all swim performances at the meet. The top 10 men and top 10 women were then awarded World Cup points. Bonus points were awarded for a world record broken (20 points) or equalled (10 points). The number of World Cup points awarded was doubled for the final meet of the World Cup in Singapore.

Rank on FINA Points	World Cup points awarded
1	25
2	20
3	16
4	13
5	10
6	7
7	5
8	3
9	2
10	1

The overall rankings are shown below.

==== Men ====
Rank	Name	Nationality	Points awarded (Bonus)					Total
Rank	Name	Nationality	RSA	RUS	SWE	GER	SIN	Total
1	Cameron van der Burgh	South Africa	16	25	25	25 (40)	32	163
2	Roland Schoeman	South Africa	25	20	16	20	50	131
3	Peter Marshall	United States	20 (20)	7	13 (20)		26 (20)	126
4	Arkady Vyatchanin	Russia	1	3	3	13 (20)	40	80
5	Evgeny Korotyshkin	Russia		13 (20)		5 (20)		58
6	Paul Biedermann	Germany				10 (40)		50
7	Felipe Silva	Brazil			20	7	20	47
8	Steffen Deibler	Germany	10			16 (20)		46
9	Sergey Fesikov	Russia	7	10		3 (20)		40
10	George Du Rand	South Africa	3	16 (20)				39
11	Kaio de Almeida	Brazil			10 (20)			30
12	Neil Versfeld	South Africa	13		7		10	30
13	Darian Townsend	South Africa	5	2	2	(20)		29
14	Nicholas Santos	Brazil				1	14	15
15	Markus Rogan	Austria	2		5			7
16	Matthew Abood	Australia					6	6
17	Stanislav Donets	Russia		5				5
18	Christian Sprenger	Australia					4	4
19	Gerhard Zandberg	South Africa				2		2
20	Guilherme Guido	Brazil					2	2
21	Stefan Nystrand	Sweden			1			1
22	Igor Borysik	Ukraine		1				1

==== Women ====
Rank	Name	Nationality	Points awarded (Bonus)					Total
Rank	Name	Nationality	RSA	RUS	SWE	GER	SIN	Total
1	Jessica Hardy	United States	20 (20)	25 (20)	20 (20)	25 (20)	40	210
2	Therese Alshammar	Sweden	25 (40)	13	25 (20)	7	50 (20)	200
3	Hinkelien Schreuder	Netherlands	13	7	2	16 (20)	26	84
4	Marieke Guehrer	Australia	16	20 (20)	13	10		79
5	Zhao Jing	China			16 (60)			76
6	Shiho Sakai	Japan				20 (40)		60
7	Leisel Jones	Australia		1	3	13 (40)		57
8	Liu Zige	China			(20)	5 (20)		45
9	Felicity Galvez	Australia	10	10	5 (20)			45
10	Evelyn Verrasztó	Hungary		16 (20)				36
11	Kathryn Meaklim	South Africa					14 (20)	34
12	Francesca Halsall	Great Britain			1		32	33
13	Sarah Katsoulis	Australia					20	20
14	Gao Chang	China			10	3		13
15	Emily Seebohm	Australia					10	10
16	Aya Terakawa	Japan			7			7
17	Inge Dekker	Netherlands	3				4	7
18	Fabíola Molina	Brazil	7					7
19	Elizabeth Simmonds	Great Britain					6	6
20	Kseniya Moskvina	Russia		5				5
21	Ranomi Kromowidjojo	Netherlands	5					5
22	Hanna-Maria Seppälä	Finland		3				3
23	Daniela Samulski	Germany				2		2
24	Whitney Myers	United States					2	2
25	Rikke Møller-Pedersen	Denmark		2				2
26	Lara Jackson	United States	2					2
27	Rie Kaneto	Japan				1		1
28	Sarah Sjöström	Sweden	1					1

=== Event winners ===
==== 50 m freestyle ====
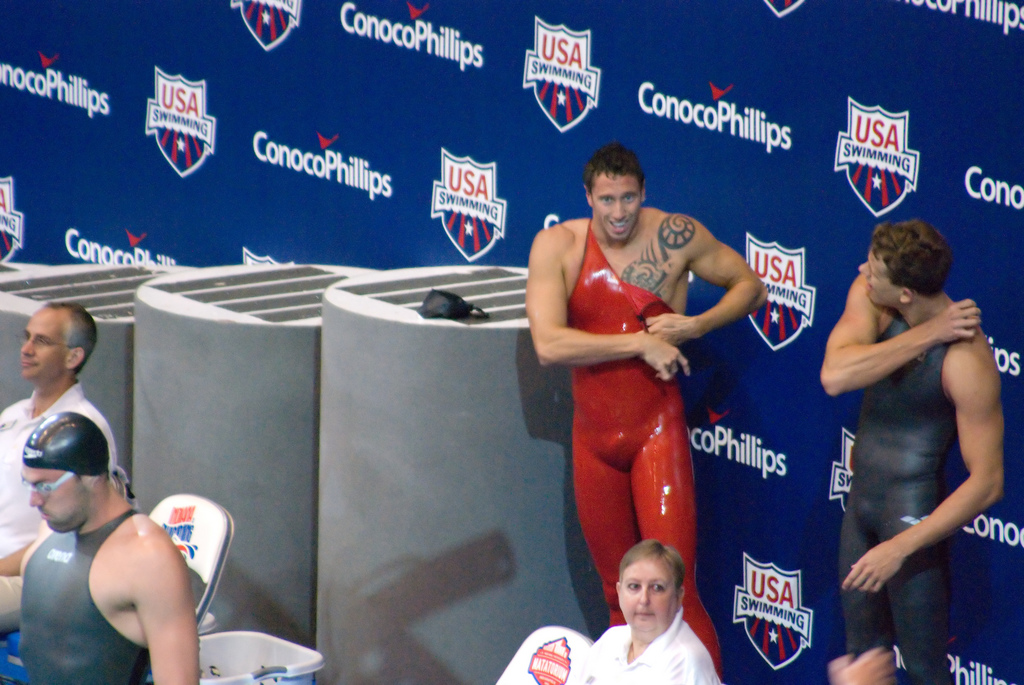
Frédérick Bousquet, winner of the men's 50 m freestyle in Stockholm.

Meet	Men			Women		
Meet	Winner	Nationality	Time	Winner	Nationality	Time
Durban	Stefan Nystrand	Sweden	21.29	Therese Alshammar	Sweden	23.74
Moscow	Roland Schoeman	South Africa	20.88 (WC)	Marieke Guehrer	Australia	23.92
Stockholm	Frédérick Bousquet	France	20.64 (WC)	Therese Alshammar	Sweden	23.75
Berlin	Roland Schoeman	South Africa	20.57 WC	Therese Alshammar	Sweden	23.34 (WC)
Singapore	Nicholas Santos	Brazil	20.75	Therese Alshammar	Sweden	23.27 WC

==== 100 m freestyle ====
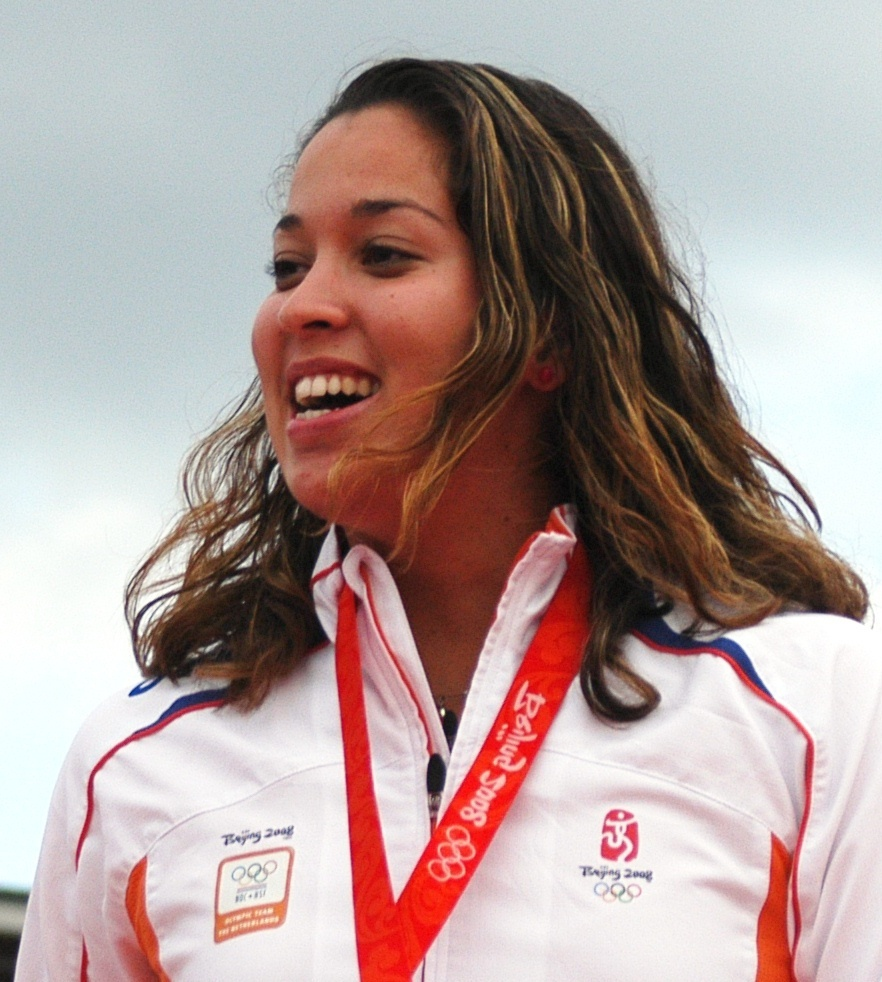
Ranomi Kromowidjojo, winner of the women's 100 m freestyle in Durban.

Meet	Men			Women		
Meet	Winner	Nationality	Time	Winner	Nationality	Time
Durban	Sergey Fesikov	Russia	46.30	Ranomi Kromowidjojo	Netherlands	52.46
Moscow	Sergey Fesikov	Russia	45.87	Jeanette Ottesen	Denmark	52.22
Stockholm	Stefan Nystrand	Sweden	45.54 (WC)	Francesca Halsall	Great Britain	51.61 (WC)
Berlin	Brent Hayden	Canada	45.56	Jeanette Ottesen	Denmark	51.95
Singapore	Matthew Abood	Australia	45.46 WC	Francesca Halsall	Great Britain	51.19 WC

==== 200 m freestyle ====
Meet	Men			Women		
Meet	Winner	Nationality	Time	Winner	Nationality	Time
Durban	Darian Townsend	South Africa	1:42.79	Felicity Galvez	Australia	1:57.60
Moscow	Alexander Sukhorukov	Russia	1:42.13	Sarah Sjöström	Sweden	1:54.02
Stockholm	Brent Hayden	Canada	1:41.65	Coralie Balmy	France	1:53.71
Berlin	Paul Biedermann	Germany	1:39.37 WR	Sarah Sjöström	Sweden	1:53.77
Singapore	Darian Townsend	South Africa	1:41.65	Petra Granlund	Sweden	1:54.76

==== 400 m freestyle ====
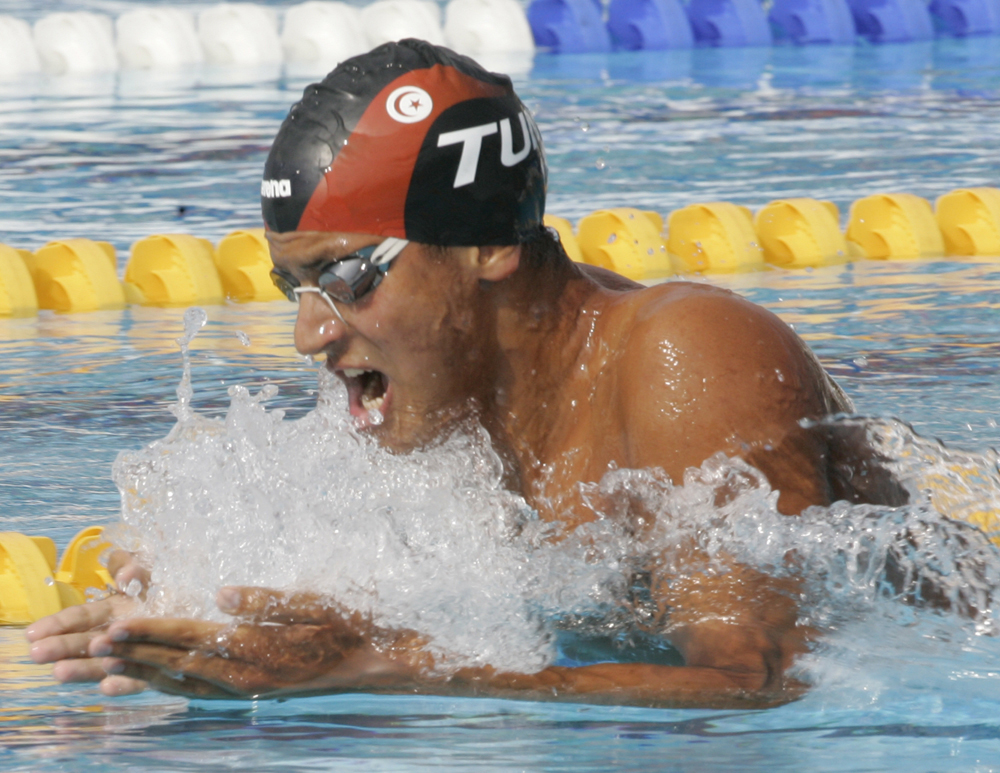
Oussama Mellouli, winner of the men's 400 m freestyle and 400 m individual medley in Singapore.

Meet	Men			Women		
Meet	Winner	Nationality	Time	Winner	Nationality	Time
Durban	Dominik Meichtry	Switzerland	3:42.09	Jessica Pengelly	South Africa	4:11.62
Moscow	Nikita Lobintsev	Russia	3:38.40	Lotte Friis	Denmark	4:01.96
Stockholm	Mads Glæsner	Denmark	3:38.78	Coralie Balmy	France	3:57.75
Berlin	Paul Biedermann	Germany	3:32.77 WR	Lotte Friis	Denmark	4:01.21
Singapore	Oussama Mellouli	Tunisia	3:39.18	Blair Evans	Australia	4:02.77

==== 1500 m (men) / 800 m (women) freestyle ====
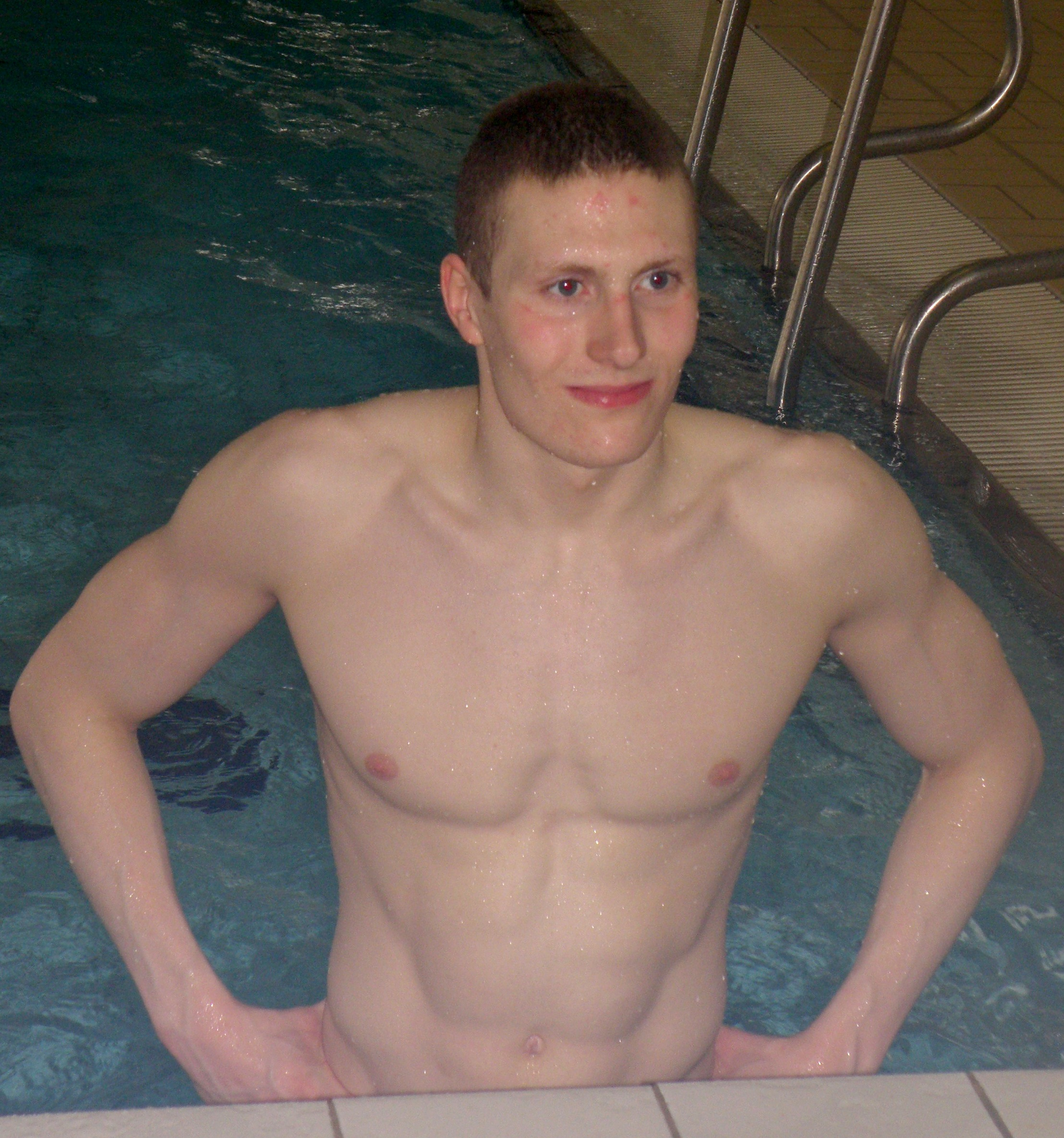
Pál Joensen, winner of the men's 1500 m freestyle in Moscow.

Meet	Men			Women		
Meet	Winner	Nationality	Time	Winner	Nationality	Time
Durban	Heerden Herman	South Africa	14:49.17	Kathryn Meaklim	South Africa	8:29.51
Moscow	Pál Joensen	Faroe Islands	14:32.64	Lotte Friis	Denmark	8:12.94
Stockholm	Federico Colbertaldo	Italy	14:28.35 WC	Lotte Friis	Denmark	8:07.94 (WC)
Berlin	Federico Colbertaldo	Italy	14:29.46	Lotte Friis	Denmark	8:04.61 WC
Singapore	Robert Hurley	Australia	14:32.47	Blair Evans	Australia	8:17.21

==== 50 m backstroke ====
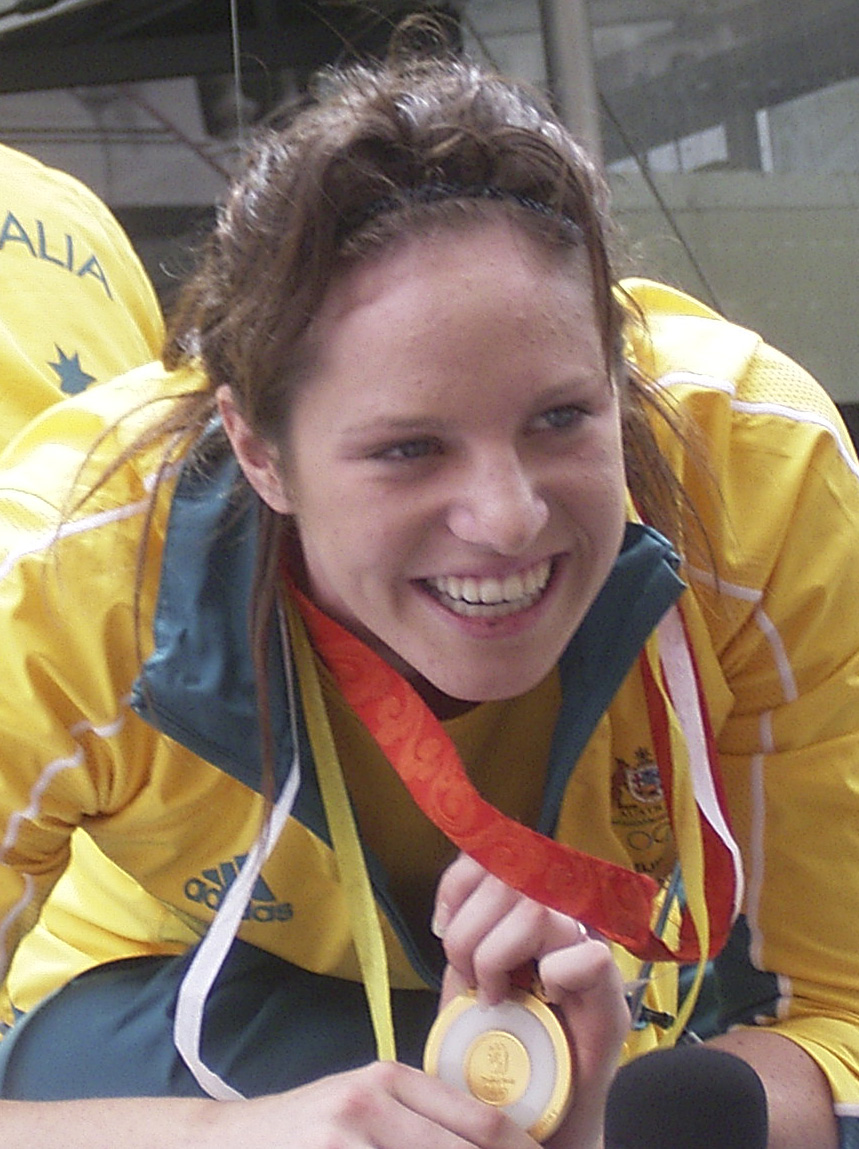
Emily Seebohm, winner of the women's 50 m backstroke in Singapore.

Meet	Men			Women		
Meet	Winner	Nationality	Time	Winner	Nationality	Time
Durban	Peter Marshall	United States	22.75 (WR)	Hinkelien Schreuder	Netherlands	26.55 (WC)
Moscow	Peter Marshall; Stanislav Donets	United States; Russia	22.94	Marieke Guehrer	Australia	26.17 (WR)
Stockholm	Peter Marshall	United States	22.73 (WR)	Zhao Jing	China	25.82 WR
Berlin	Gerhard Zandberg	South Africa	22.85	Marieke Guehrer	Australia	26.09
Singapore	Peter Marshall	United States	22.61 WR	Emily Seebohm	Australia	26.55

==== 100 m backstroke ====
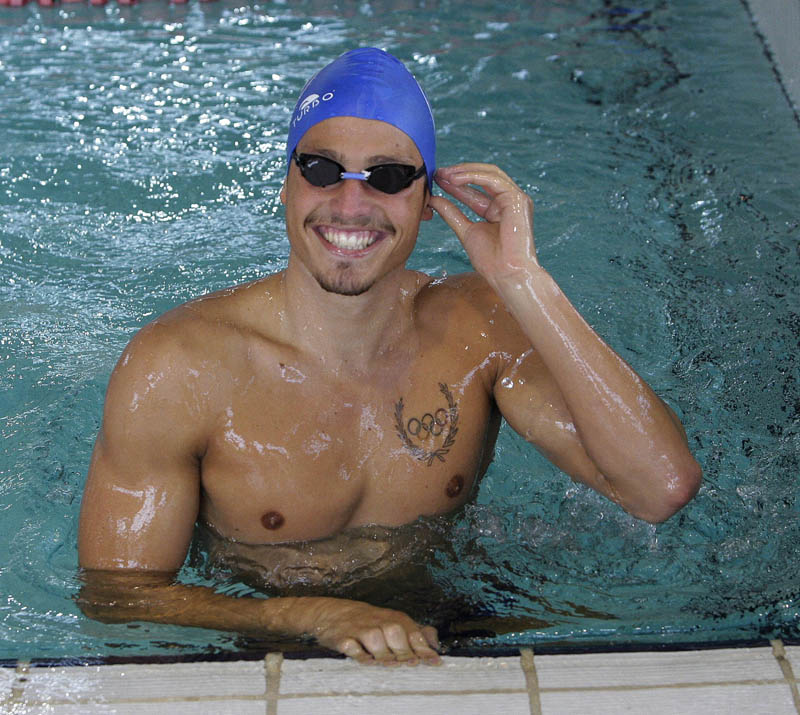
Aschwin Wildeboer, winner of the men's 100 m backstroke in Berlin.

Meet	Men			Women		
Meet	Winner	Nationality	Time	Winner	Nationality	Time
Durban	Peter Marshall	United States	49.40 (WC)	Fabíola Molina	Brazil	57.77
Moscow	Peter Marshall	United States	49.49	Kseniya Moskvina	Russia	56.66
Stockholm	Peter Marshall	United States	49.29 WC	Shiho Sakai	Japan	56.42 (WC)
Berlin	Aschwin Wildeboer	Spain	49.55	Shiho Sakai	Japan	55.23 WR
Singapore	Guilherme Guido	Brazil	49.63	Marieke Guehrer	Australia	56.97

==== 200 m backstroke ====
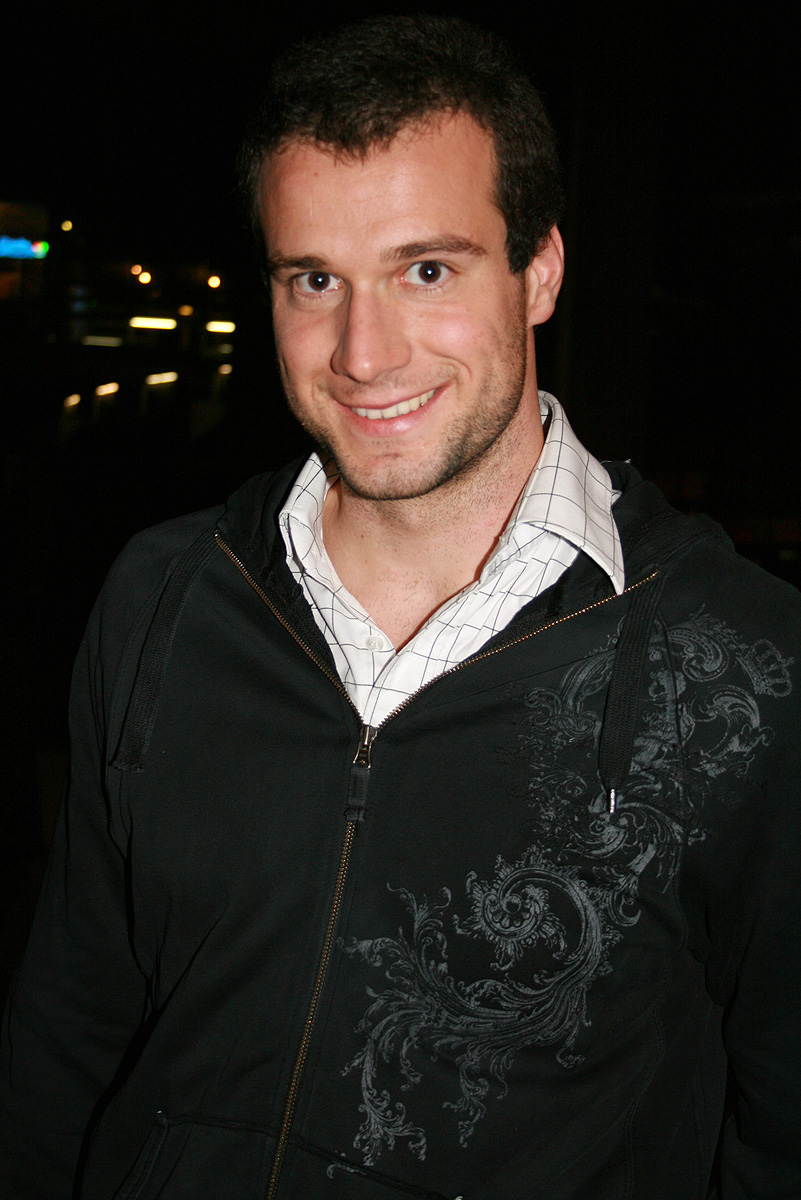
Markus Rogan, winner of the men's 200 m backstroke in Stockholm.

Meet	Men			Women		
Meet	Winner	Nationality	Time	Winner	Nationality	Time
Durban	George Du Rand	South Africa	1:49.53	Whitney Myers	United States	2:07.96
Moscow	George Du Rand	South Africa	1:47.08 WR	Daryna Zevina	Ukraine	2:04.59
Stockholm	Markus Rogan	Austria	1:47.64 NR	Elizabeth Simmonds	Great Britain	2:02.01 (WC)
Berlin	Arkady Vyatchanin	Russia	1:46.11 WR	Shiho Sakai	Japan	2:00.18 WR
Singapore	Arkady Vyatchanin	Russia	1:46.41	Elizabeth Simmonds	Great Britain	2:01.48

==== 50 m breaststroke ====
Meet	Men			Women		
Meet	Winner	Nationality	Time	Winner	Nationality	Time
Durban	Roland Schoeman	South Africa	25.90 (WC)	Jessica Hardy	United States	29.45 (WR)
Moscow	Cameron van der Burgh	South Africa	25.58 (WC)	Jessica Hardy	United States	29.36 (WR)
Stockholm	Cameron van der Burgh	South Africa	25.68	Jessica Hardy	United States	29.29*
Berlin	Cameron van der Burgh	South Africa	25.25 WR	Jessica Hardy	United States	28.80 WR
Singapore	Roland Schoeman	South Africa	25.58	Jessica Hardy	United States	29.09

* Jessica Hardy set a new world record of 28.96 seconds in the heats of this event in Stockholm.

==== 100 m breaststroke ====
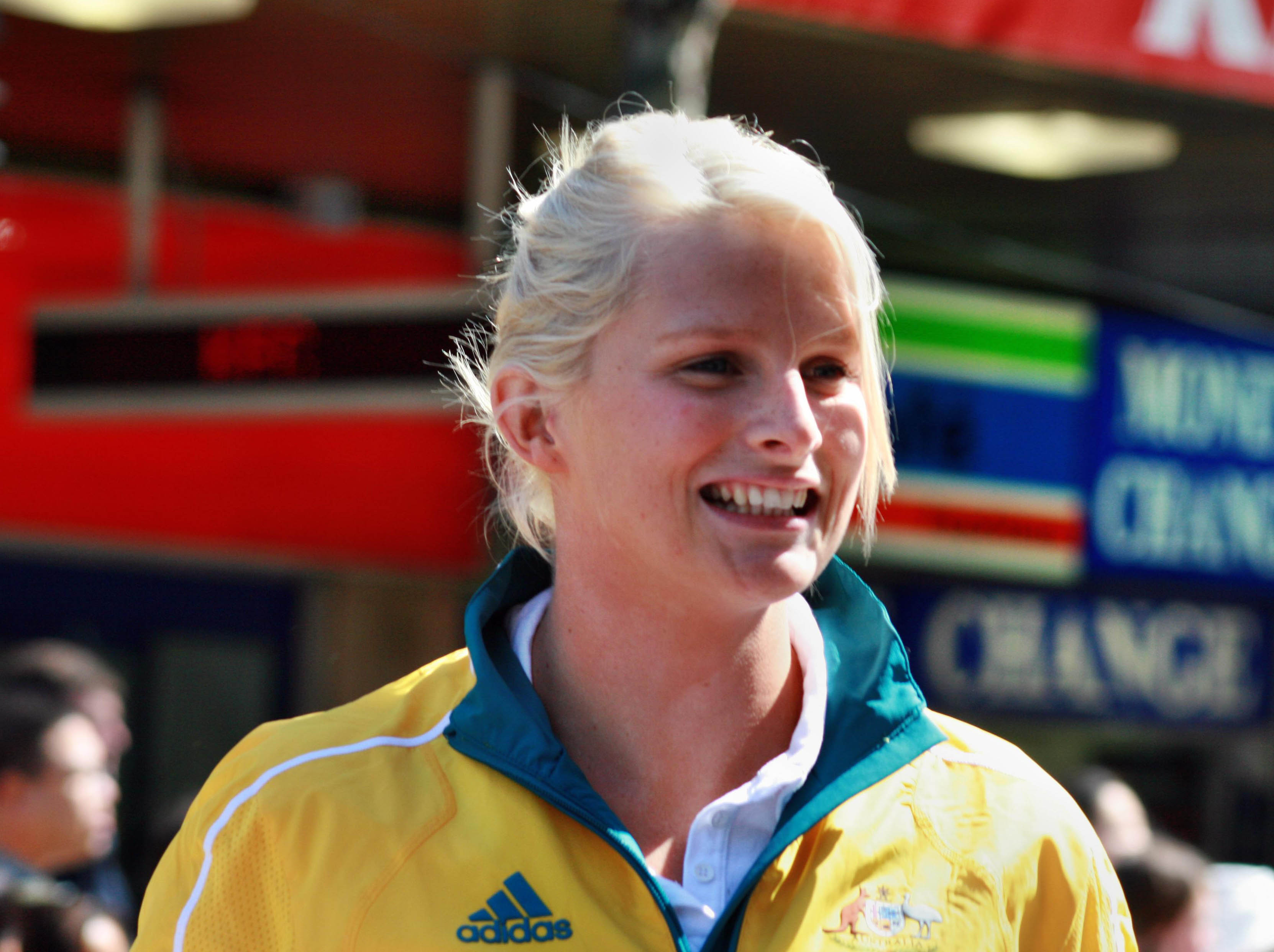
Leisel Jones, winner of the women's 100 m breaststroke in Stockholm and Berlin, and the 200 m breaststroke in Berlin.

Meet	Men			Women		
Meet	Winner	Nationality	Time	Winner	Nationality	Time
Durban	Cameron van der Burgh	South Africa	56.60 (WC)	Jessica Hardy	United States	1:04.15 (WC)
Moscow	Cameron van der Burgh	South Africa	56.36 (WC)	Jessica Hardy	United States	1:03.75 (WC)
Stockholm	Cameron van der Burgh	South Africa	56.17 (WC)	Leisel Jones	Australia	1:03.74 (WC)
Berlin	Cameron van der Burgh	South Africa	55.61 WR	Leisel Jones	Australia	1:03.00 WR
Singapore	Cameron van der Burgh	South Africa	56.25	Sarah Katsoulis	Australia	1:03.73

==== 200 m breaststroke ====
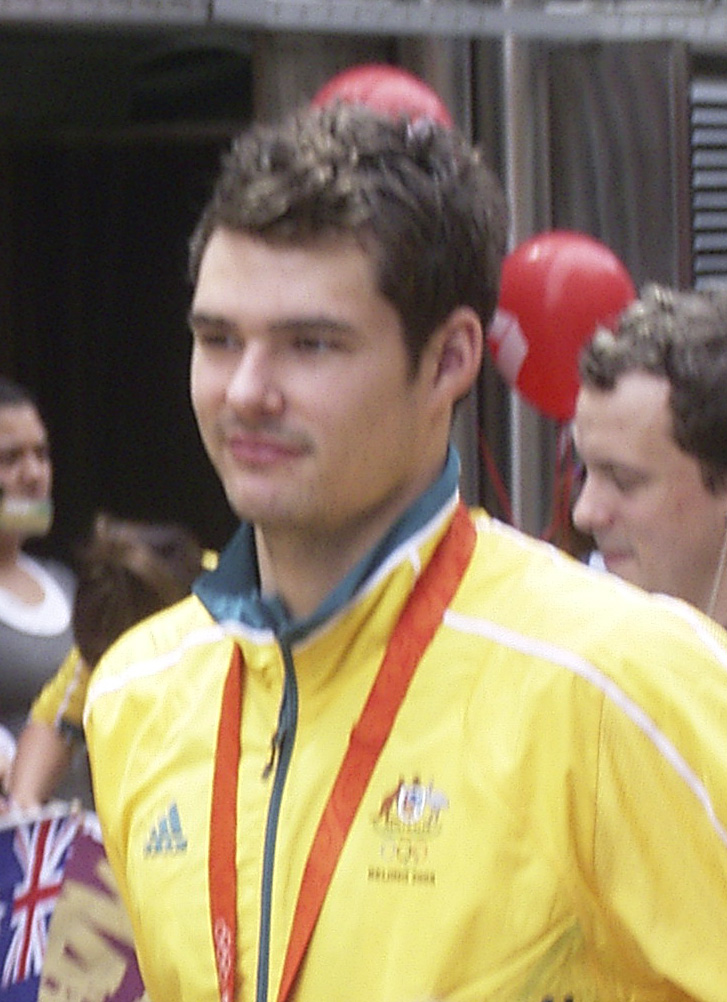
Christian Sprenger, winner of the men's 200 m breaststroke in Singapore.

Meet	Men			Women		
Meet	Winner	Nationality	Time	Winner	Nationality	Time
Durban	Neil Versfeld	South Africa	2:03.35	Nađa Higl	Serbia	2:20.41
Moscow	Neil Versfeld	South Africa	2:04.15	Rikke Møller-Pedersen	Denmark	2:19.58
Stockholm	Neil Versfeld	South Africa	2:02.67 (WC)	Nađa Higl	Serbia	2:18.54
Berlin	Melquiades Alvarez	Spain	2:02.67*	Leisel Jones	Australia	2:15.42 WR
Singapore	Christian Sprenger	Australia	2:02.65	Kathryn Meaklim	South Africa	2:20.52

* Neil Versfeld set a new World Cup record of 2:02.56 seconds in the heats of this event in Berlin.

==== 50 m butterfly ====
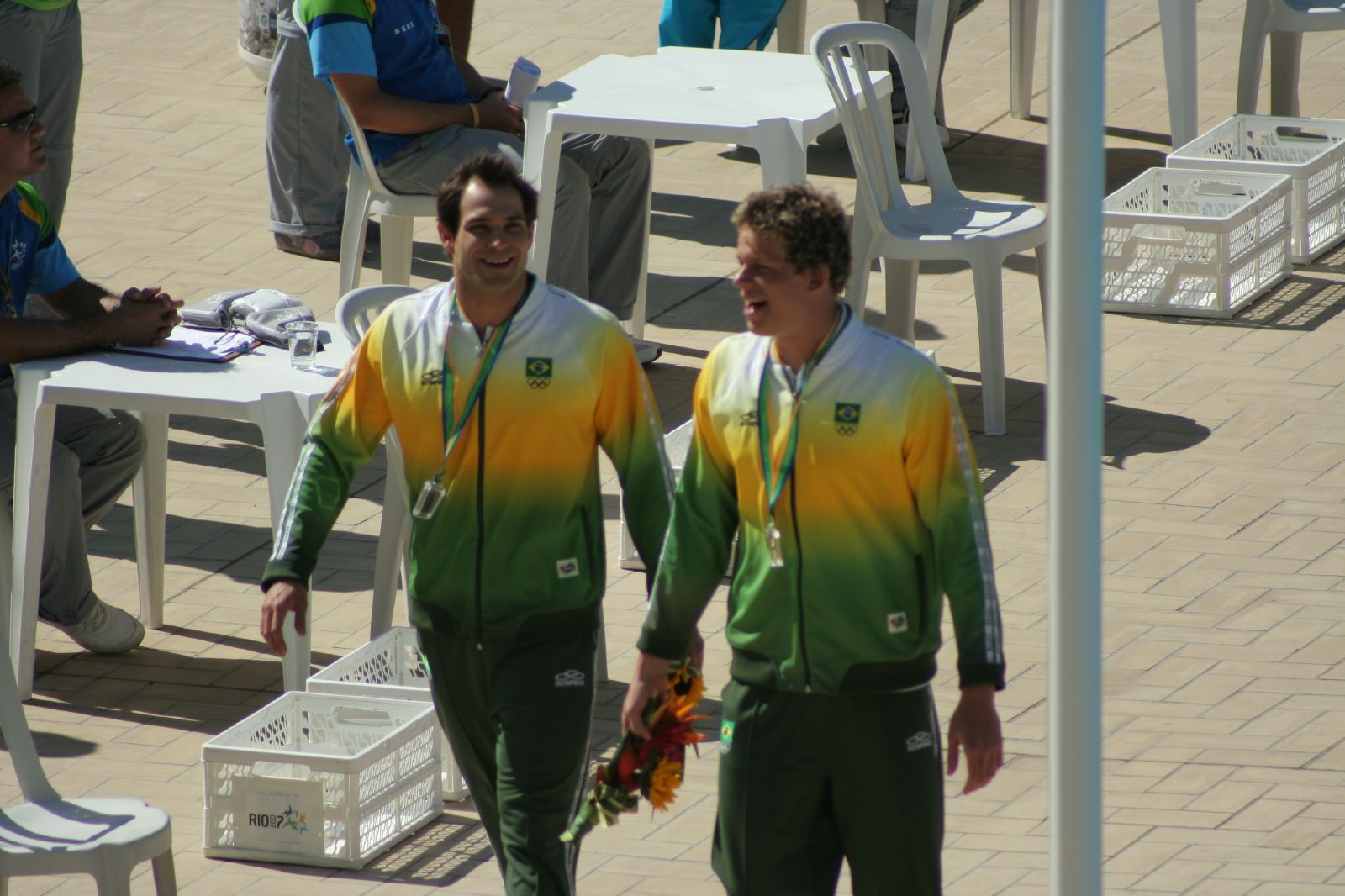
Nicholas Santos (left), winner of the men's 50 m freestyle and 50 m butterfly in Singapore.

Meet	Men			Women		
Meet	Winner	Nationality	Time	Winner	Nationality	Time
Durban	Roland Schoeman	South Africa	22.32 (WC)	Therese Alshammar	Sweden	24.75 (WR)
Moscow	Roland Schoeman	South Africa	22.33	Therese Alshammar	Sweden	25.10
Stockholm	Roland Schoeman	South Africa	22.08 (WC)	Therese Alshammar	Sweden	24.46 (WR)
Berlin	Steffen Deibler	Germany	21.80 WR	Marieke Guehrer	Australia	24.69
Singapore	Nicholas Santos	Brazil	22.16	Therese Alshammar	Sweden	24.38 WR

==== 100 m butterfly ====
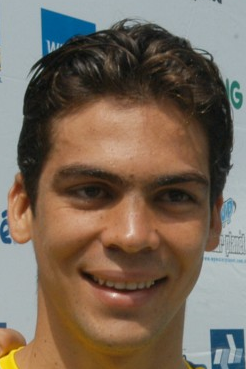
Kaio de Almeida, winner of the men's 100 m and 200 m butterfly in Stockholm.

Meet	Men			Women		
Meet	Winner	Nationality	Time	Winner	Nationality	Time
Durban	Yevgeny Korotyshkin	Russia	50.23	Therese Alshammar	Sweden	56.12 (WC)
Moscow	Yevgeny Korotyshkin	Russia	48.99 (WR)	Felicity Galvez	Australia	55.82 (WC)
Stockholm	Kaio de Almeida	Brazil	49.44	Felicity Galvez	Australia	55.46 WR
Berlin	Yevgeny Korotyshkin	Russia	48.48 WR	Felicity Galvez	Australia	55.62
Singapore	Mitchell Patterson	Australia	49.51	Felicity Galvez	Australia	56.07

==== 200 m butterfly ====
Meet	Men			Women		
Meet	Winner	Nationality	Time	Winner	Nationality	Time
Durban	Chad le Clos	South Africa	1:54.45	Felicity Galvez	Australia	2:05.55
Moscow	Nikolay Skvortsov	Russia	1:51.30	Joanna Maranhão	Brazil	2:04.01 (WC)
Stockholm	Kaio de Almeida	Brazil	1:49.11 WR	Liu Zige	China	2:02.50 (WR)
Berlin	Nikolay Skvortsov	Russia	1:50.58	Liu Zige	China	2:00.78 WR
Singapore	Kazuya Kaneda	Japan	1:51.54	Jessicah Schipper	Australia	2:03.27

==== 100 m individual medley ====
Meet	Men			Women		
Meet	Winner	Nationality	Time	Winner	Nationality	Time
Durban	Sergey Fesikov	Russia	51.96	Jessica Hardy	United States	59.93*
Moscow	Sergey Fesikov	Russia	51.45 (WC)	Hinkelien Schreuder	Netherlands	58.88
Stockholm	Gerhard Zandberg	South Africa	51.77	Zhao Jing	China	58.40 (WR)
Berlin	Sergey Fesikov	Russia	50.96**	Hinkelien Schreuder	Netherlands	57.74 WR
Singapore	Darian Townsend	South Africa	52.11	Hinkelien Schreuder	Netherlands	58.32

* Therese Alshammar set a new world record of 58.51 seconds in the heats of this event in Durban.
** Sergey Fesikov set a new world record of 50.95 seconds in the heats of this event in Berlin.

==== 200 m individual medley ====
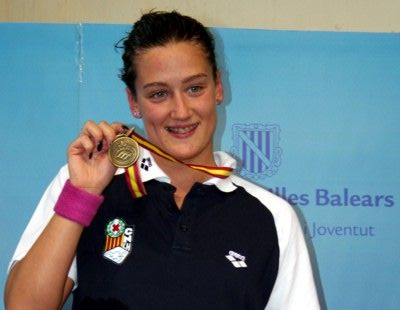
Mireia Belmonte García, winner of the women's 200 m and 400 m individual medley in Stockholm.

Meet	Men			Women		
Meet	Winner	Nationality	Time	Winner	Nationality	Time
Durban	Darian Townsend	South Africa	1:53.13	Whitney Myers	United States	2:09.10
Moscow	Darian Townsend	South Africa	1:52.93	Evelyn Verrasztó	Hungary	2:06.01 WR
Stockholm	Darian Townsend	South Africa	1:51.79 (WC)	Mireia Belmonte García	Spain	2:06.44
Berlin	Darian Townsend	South Africa	1:51.55 WR	Li Jiaxing	China	2:07.34
Singapore	Darian Townsend	South Africa	1:52.49	Whitney Myers	United States	2:06.20

==== 400 m individual medley ====
Meet	Men			Women		
Meet	Winner	Nationality	Time	Winner	Nationality	Time
Durban	Chad le Clos	South Africa	4.05.04	Kathryn Meaklim	South Africa	4:30.53
Moscow	Dávid Verrasztó	Hungary	4:03.45	Joanna Maranhão	Brazil	4:26.98 (WC)
Stockholm	Joseph Roebuck	Great Britain	4:03.29	Mireia Belmonte García	Spain	4:26.40 (WC)
Berlin	Chad le Clos	South Africa	4:02.18	Tanya Hunks	Canada	4:30.52
Singapore	Oussama Mellouli	Tunisia	4:05.79	Kathryn Meaklim	South Africa	4:22.88 WR

Legend: WR – World record; (WR) – World record when swum (earning bonus World Cup points); WC – World Cup record; (WC) – World Cup record when swum

== See also ==
- List of World Cup records in swimming
