= Matt Jaukovic =

Australian swimmer

Personal information
- Nationality: Australia
- Born: 17 November 1985 (age 40) Montenegro
- Height: 1.80 m (5 ft 11 in)

Sport
- Sport: Swimming
- Strokes: Backstroke, butterfly
Medal record
Men's swimming
Representing Australia
Event	1st	2nd	3rd
Swimming World Cup	7	3	0
Total	7	3	0
Swimming World Cup
Gold medal – first place	2008 Sydney	50 m butterfly
Gold medal – first place	2008 Sydney	100 m butterfly
Gold medal – first place	2008 Singapore	50 m butterfly
Gold medal – first place	2008 Moscow	50 m butterfly
Gold medal – first place	2008 Moscow	100 m butterfly
Gold medal – first place	2008 Stockholm	50 m butterfly
Gold medal – first place	2008 Berlin	50 m butterfly
Silver medal – second place	2008 Singapore	100 m butterfly
Silver medal – second place	2008 Stockholm	100 m butterfly
Silver medal – second place	2008 Berlin	100 m butterfly

Matija "Matt" Jaukovic (born 17 November 1985) is an Australian and former Montenegrin competitive swimmer. He is a former world record-holder in the short course 50 metre butterfly. Over the course of his career he has also held Commonwealth, Oceanian, Australian national, and Australian All Comers records in the short course 50 metre butterfly as well as an Australian All Comers record in the 100 metre butterfly. He won a total of 10 medals in international competitions, all at the FINA Swimming World Cup, seven of which were gold medals and three of which were silver medals. Before competing representing Australia, he set a Montenegrin national record in the 100 metre backstroke.

== Early life and education ==
Jaukovic was born in Montenegro before moving to Australia to study law and gaining Australian citizenship.

== Swimming career ==
=== 2004 European Aquatics Championships ===
Jaukovic represented Montenegro, competing as part of the joined Montenegro and Serbia (SCG) team, at the 2004 European Aquatics Championships in Madrid, Spain. He set a Montenegrin national record in the prelims heats of the 100 metre backstroke with a time of 59.39 seconds, ranked 33rd overall and did not advance to the semifinals.

=== 2008 Australian Short Course Championships ===
At the 2008 Australian Short Course Swimming Championships held in Melbourne in September, Jaukovic set a new Australian All Comers record in the 100 metre butterfly with his time of 50.37 seconds, breaking the approximately eight-year-old record set by Geoff Huegill at 50.71 seconds.

=== 2008 FINA Swimming World Cup ===
==== Stop 3: Sydney ====
2008 World Cup – Sydney
Gold medal – first place	50 m butterfly	22.50 (WR)
Gold medal – first place	100 m butterfly	50.50

Jaukovic started competition in the 2008 FINA Swimming World Cup at the third stop of the competition circuit, swimming a time of 23.00 seconds in the prelims heats of the 50 metre butterfly and qualifying for the final ranking first overall. In the final of the 50 metre butterfly, Jaukovic won the gold medal in the event with a world record and World Cup record time of 22.50 seconds, finishing 0.99 seconds ahead of the next fastest swimmer, and earning 1039 points on the FINA scoring system for his swim. His time of 22.50 seconds broke the world record set over two years earlier by Kaio Almeida of Brazil at 22.60 seconds. With his world record in the 50 metre butterfly, he became the third Australian swimmer to hold the world record in the event after Michael Klim and Geoff Huegill. The next day, 26 October, he competed in the prelims heats of the 100 metre butterfly, qualifying for the final ranking first with his time of 51.83 seconds. He wrapped up his competition at the Sydney World Cup stop with a second gold medal, this time in the 100 metre butterfly where he finished first with a time of 50.50 seconds in the final.

==== Stop 4: Singapore ====
2008 World Cup – Singapore
Gold medal – first place	50 m butterfly	22.82
Silver medal – second place	100 m butterfly	51.46

After arriving in Singapore for the fourth stop of the World Cup, Jaukovic competed in his first event on the first day of competition, 1 November, advancing to the final of the 50 metre butterfly after swimming a 23.27 in the prelims heats. Later the same day, he won the gold medal in the final with a time of 22.82 seconds, finishing over two tenths of a second ahead of silver medalist Yevgeny Korotyshkin of Russia. The second and final day of competition in Singapore, Jaukovic qualified for the final of the 100 metre butterfly with his time of 51.90 seconds that ranked his fastest overall in the prelims heats. In the final, he won the silver medal with his time of 51.46 seconds, only being out-touched at the wall by Yevgeny Korotyshkin.

==== Stop 5: Moscow ====
2008 World Cup – Moscow
Gold medal – first place	50 m butterfly	23.12
Gold medal – first place	100 m butterfly	50.68

Moving on to his third World Cup stop, and the fifth stop of the World Cup circuit this time held in Moscow, Russia, Jaukovic once again started competition on day one, 8 November, with the prelims heats of the 50 metre butterfly, finishing with a time of 23.29 seconds and qualifying for the final ranked first overall. In the final he won his third gold medal of the World Cup circuit in the event, finishing less than two tenths of a second ahead of Kohei Kawamoto of Japan in a time of 23.12 seconds. The next day Jaukovic ranked first across all prelims heats in the 100 metre butterfly with a swim of 51.45 seconds, advancing to the final later in the day. Come race time in the final, he swam a 50.68 to earn the gold medal in the event, narrowly touching ahead of Yevgeny Korotyshkin by four hundredths of a second.

==== Stop 6: Stockholm ====
2008 World Cup – Stockholm
Gold medal – first place	50 m butterfly	22.85
Silver medal – second place	100 m butterfly	50.31

On 11 November, the first day of competition of the World Cup stop in Stockholm, Sweden, Jaukovic ranked first in the prelims heats of the 50 metre butterfly with his time of 23.02, which was about a quarter of a second ahead of the second ranked swimmer, Lyndon Ferns of South Africa. In the final of the event later the same day, Jaukovic won his fourth gold medal in the 50 metre butterfly with a time of 22.85 seconds, making it his fourth consecutive gold medal in the race at FINA Swimming World Cup competition. The following day, 12 November, he advanced to the final of the 100 metre butterfly with a time of 51.72 seconds and overall number one ranking from the prelims heats. Jaukovic won the silver medal in the final with a personal best time of 50.31 seconds and was flanked in finishing by two Russian swimmers, with Yevgeny Korotyshkin taking the gold medal and Nikolay Skvortsov winning the bronze medal.

==== Stop 7: Berlin ====
2008 World Cup – Berlin
Gold medal – first place	50 m butterfly	22.58
Silver medal – second place	100 m butterfly	50.70

At the seventh and final stop of the 2008 World Cup circuit, held in Berlin, Germany, Jaukovic commenced competition on the first day, 15 November, finishing ranked first in the prelims heats of the 50 metre butterfly with a time of 23.10 seconds. In the final he went five-for-five, winning his fifth gold medal out of a possible five gold medals, in the 50 metre butterfly with a time of 22.58 seconds that was just eight hundredths of a second off his own world record time, two hundredths of a second faster than the former world record of 22.60 seconds by Kaio Almeida, and three tenths of a second faster than second-place finisher Johannes Dietrich of Germany. On 16 November in his last event of the World Cup circuit, the 100 metre butterfly, Jaukovic ranked second overall in the prelims heats with a time of 51.81 seconds and advanced to the final. In the evening final, he won his third silver medal of the World Cup circuit in the event with a time of 50.70 seconds and finished only behind Yevgeny Korotyshkin who won the gold medal in the event with a new World Cup record time of 49.74 seconds.

=== 2009 Australian Short Course Championships ===
In August, at the 2009 Australian Short Course Swimming Championships in Hobart, Jaukovic lowered his personal best time in the 50 metre butterfly to a 22.28 and setting new Oceanian, Commonwealth, Australian, and Australian All Comers records in the event. The Oceanian and Australian records remained unbroken for over 12 years until Kyle Chalmers swam representing Australia at the 2021 FINA Swimming World Cup and broke the records with a time of 22.24 seconds.

== Career best times ==
Personal bests
Event	Long course	Short course
50 m butterfly	23.62	22.28 (ACR, Former OC, CR, NR)
100 m butterfly	52.56	50.31
(OC) – Oceanian record (CR) – Commonwealth record (NR) – Australian record (ACR) – Australian All Comers record

== World records ==
=== Representing Australia ===
==== Short course metres (25 m pool) ====
No.	Event	Time	Meet	Location	Date	Age	Status	Ref
1	50 m butterfly	22.50	2008 FINA Swimming World Cup	Sydney	25 October 2008	22	Former	

== Continental and national records ==
=== Representing Montenegro ===
==== Long course metres (50 m pool) ====
No.	Event	Time		Meet	Location	Date	Age	Type	Status	Ref
1	100 m backstroke	59.39	h	2004 European Aquatics Championships	Madrid, Spain	10 May 2004	18	NR	Current	

Legend: NR – Montenegrin record; e – equalled existing record;
Records not set in finals: h – heat; sf – semifinal; r – relay 1st leg; rh – relay heat 1st leg; b – B final; † – en route to final mark; so – swim-off; tt – time trial

=== Representing Australia ===
==== Short course metres (25 m pool) ====
No.	Event	Time	Meet	Location	Date	Age	Type	Status	Notes	Ref
1	100 m butterfly	50.37	2008 Australian Short Course Championships	Melbourne	21 September 2008	22	ACR	Former		
2	50 m butterfly	22.50	2008 FINA Swimming World Cup	Sydney	25 October 2008	22	OC, NR, ACR	Former	Former WR, CR	
3	50 m butterfly (2)	22.28	2009 Australian Short Course Championships	Hobart	10 August 2009	23	OC, NR, ACR	Current ACR	Former CR	

Legend: WR – World record; OC – Oceanian record; CR – Commonwealth record; NR – Australian record; e – equalled existing record; ACR – Australian All Comers record;
Records not set in finals: h – heat; sf – semifinal; r – relay 1st leg; rh – relay heat 1st leg; b – B final; † – en route to final mark; so – swim-off; tt – time trial

== See also ==
- World record progression 50 metres butterfly
- Montenegrin Australians

Records
Preceded by Kaio de Almeida	Men's 50 metre butterfly world record holder (short course); 25 October 2008 – 6 December 2008	Succeeded by Amaury Leveaux
