= William Diering =

South African swimmer (born 1986)

Personal information
- Full name: William Grant Diering
- National team: South Africa
- Born: 7 May 1986 (age 40) Sandton, Gauteng, South Africa
- Height: 1.82 m (6 ft 0 in)
- Weight: 67 kg (148 lb)

Sport
- Sport: Swimming
- Strokes: Breaststroke
- Club: TuksSport
Medal record
Men's swimming
Representing South Africa
World Championships (SC)
Bronze medal – third place	2008 Manchester	200 m breaststroke
All-Africa Games
Silver medal – second place	2007 Algiers	200 m breaststroke

William Grant Diering (born 7 May 1986) is a South African swimmer, who specialized in breaststroke events. He finished twelfth in the 200 m breaststroke at the 2008 Summer Olympics, and also set a new South African record (2:06.85) to earn a bronze medal at the FINA World Short Course Championships few months later in Manchester, England.

Diering competed for the South African swimming squad, alongside his teammate Neil Versfeld, in the men's 200 m breaststroke at the 2008 Summer Olympics in Beijing. Leading up to the Games, he captured the men's 200 m breaststroke title at the South African Championships in Johannesburg with a new national record of 2:11.88 to assure his selection to the Olympic team under the FINA A-cut (2:13.70) and shave 1.72 seconds off the standard previously set by Terence Parkin in 2000. Swimming in heat six, Diering threw down a new African record in 2:10.39 to grab the eighth seed for the semifinals, and then enjoyed his teammate Versfeld joining him to the roster by 0.11 seconds to round out the top four of their heat. Followed by the next morning's semifinals, Diering missed the top eight final with a twelfth-place time in 2:10.21, and lost a spirited challenge for another African record feat to Versfeld (2:10.06) by just a small fraction of a second.

Shortly after the Olympics, Diering edged out Tunisia's Oussama Mellouli by nearly two seconds to claim the 200 m breaststroke title at the African Swimming Championships in Johannesburg with a time of 2:16.00.
