= Kaio de Almeida =

Brazilian swimmer (born 1984)

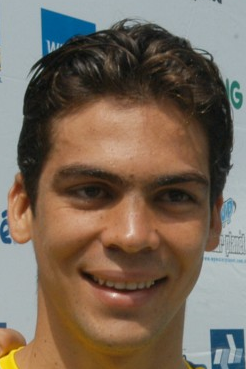
- Almeida in 2006

Personal information
- Full name: Kaio Márcio Ferreira Costa de Almeida
- Nationality: Brazil
- Born: 19 October 1984 (age 41) João Pessoa, Paraíba, Brazil
- Height: 1.75 m (5 ft 9 in)
- Weight: 76 kg (168 lb)

Sport
- Sport: Swimming
- Strokes: Butterfly
- Club: Fiat/Minas
Medal record
Men's swimming
Representing Brazil
World Championships (SC)
Gold medal – first place	2006 Shanghai	100m butterfly
Silver medal – second place	2010 Dubai	200m butterfly
Bronze medal – third place	2006 Shanghai	50m butterfly
Bronze medal – third place	2010 Dubai	100m butterfly
Bronze medal – third place	2010 Dubai	4×100m medley
Pan American Games
Gold medal – first place	2007 Rio	100m butterfly
Gold medal – first place	2007 Rio	200m butterfly
Gold medal – first place	2011 Guadalajara	4x100m medley
Gold medal – first place	2015 Toronto	4×200 m freestyle
Silver medal – second place	2003 Santo Domingo	200m butterfly
Silver medal – second place	2003 Santo Domingo	4x100 m medley
Silver medal – second place	2007 Rio	4x100m medley
Bronze medal – third place	2003 Santo Domingo	100m butterfly
Bronze medal – third place	2011 Guadalajara	200m butterfly

Kaio Márcio Ferreira Costa de Almeida (born 19 October 1984) is a Brazilian swimmer who specializes in the butterfly. He is also known by the reduced versions of his name: Kaio Márcio, Kaio Márcio de Almeida, Kaio Almeida, or Kaio de Almeida.

Almeida was nine years old when he began swimming in Esporte Clube Cabo Branco in João Pessoa. He suffered from asthma attacks and began swimming for medical reasons, and under the influence of his father, José Márcio. At the time, Almeida was nicknamed "Gordo" (fat), a nickname he lost at age 15 when he lost weight and began to train and compete regularly. As of February 2015, he competes for the swimming team of Minas Tênis Clube.

== International career ==
=== 2003 ===
At the age of 18, Almeida competed in the 200-meter butterfly semifinal at the 2003 World Aquatics Championships in Barcelona, where he ranked 13th. He also swam the 100-meter butterfly, ranking 22nd. In the 100-meter butterfly, he broke the Brazilian record with a time of 53.98 seconds. In the 200-meter butterfly, he broke a 20-year South American record set by Ricardo Prado in 1983. Almeida's time was 1:58.83 and the record was 1:59.00.

In August, Almeida competed at the 2003 Pan American Games in Santo Domingo, where he won silver medals in the 200-meter butterfly and 4×100-meter medley, and a bronze in the 100-meter butterfly. He broke his Brazilian records in the 100-meter butterfly with a time of 53.44 seconds, and in the 200-meter butterfly with a time of 1:58.10, both getting the Olympic index. In the 4×100-meter medley, he broke the South American record with a time of 3:40.02.

=== 2004 ===
In June 2004, participating in the second stage of the Circuit Mare Nostrum in Canet, France, Almeida broke the long-course South American record in the 200-meter butterfly with a time of 1:57.38, which was set by the Venezuelan Rafael Vidal since 1984 (1:57.51). Almeida participated in 2004 Summer Olympics in Athens, where he finished 17th in the 100-meter butterfly, 19th in 200-meter butterfly and 15th in 4×100-meter medley. On 10 September 2004, Almeida broke the South American record in the 50-meter butterfly with a time of 23.33 seconds. The previous record of 23.41 seconds was set in 2001 by Nicholas Santos.

Almeida competed at the 2004 FINA World Swimming Championships (25 m) held in Indianapolis in October. He finished fourth in the 4×100-meter medley, breaking the South American record with a time of 3:33.02, along with César Cielo, Guilherme Guido and Eduardo Fischer. He also finished fourth in the 50-meter butterfly—only three hundredths of a second away from winning a bronze medal, and seven hundredths of a second away from winning a silver medal. Almeida broke the South American record in the semifinals with a time of 23.22 seconds, and in the final with a time of 23.29 seconds. His semifinal time was the same as that of the silver medalist Mark Foster. Almeida finished fifth in the 100-meter butterfly—only 12 hundredths of a second away from winning a bronze medal. In this event, he broke the South American record twice with times of 52.18 seconds in the heats and 51.80 seconds in the final.

=== 2005 ===
Almeida competed in the 2005 World Aquatics Championships in Montreal, where he was a finalist in the 100-meter butterfly, finishing in seventh place. He also ranked 14th in the 200-meter butterfly and 17th in the 50-meter butterfly.

In 2005, he twice broke the South American record in the 50-meter butterfly with times of 23.17 seconds on 9 September and 22.92 seconds on 21 November. On 17 December, he established a new world record in the short-course 50-meter butterfly with a time of 22.60 seconds. The former world record holder was Ian Crocker of the US, with a time of 22.71 seconds in October 2004. Almeida's record was beaten in 2008 by Australian Matt Jaukovic, who improved the record to 22.50 seconds. On December, Almeida also broke the short-course South American record in the 100-meter butterfly with a time of 50.62 seconds and in the 200-meter butterfly with a time of 1:53.27. He finished among the top three in the world rankings of the butterfly races, became the world record holder in the 50-meter, and finished second in the 100-meter and third in the 200-meter.

=== 2006 ===
Almeida won the gold medal in the 100-meter butterfly in the 2006 FINA World Swimming Championships (25 m) held in Shanghai. It was his biggest title. In the same competition, he also won a bronze medal in the 50-meter butterfly and finished 10th in the 200-meter butterfly. Almeida swam at the 2006 Pan Pacific Swimming Championships, where he finished eighth in the 100-meter butterfly and in the 200-meter butterfly.

=== 2007 ===
At the 2007 Pan American Games in Rio de Janeiro, Almeida won gold medals in the 100-meter butterfly with a time of 52.05 seconds—a Pan American Games record— and the 200-meter butterfly in 1:55.45 seconds—a Pan record and South American record—and a silver in the 4×100-meter medley in 3:35.81 seconds—a South American record.

=== 2008 ===
In 2008, Almeida reached the final of the 200-meter butterfly in the 2008 Summer Olympics in Beijing, finishing in seventh place. He finished 15th in the 100-meter butterfly and 14th in the 4×100-meter medley.

=== 2009 ===
On 8 May 2009, at Maria Lenk Aquatic Center, Almeida swam the 200-meter butterfly in 1:53.92 seconds; the fifth-fastest time in the race's history and a South American record. The day before, he broke the South American record for the 100-meter butterfly with a time of 51.64 seconds, but he did not swam the final, in which Gabriel Mangabeira set a new record of 51.21 seconds.

At the 2009 World Aquatics Championships in Rome, Almeida finished in fourth place in the 200-meter butterfly with a time of 1:54.27. He ranked 20th in the 50-meter butterfly and 29th in the 100-meter butterfly.

In the Stockholm stage of the FINA World Cup in November 2009, Almeida broke his South American record in the heats of the 200-meter butterfly with a time of 1:51.46 seconds. At the finals, he set a world record in the short-course 200-meter butterfly in 1:49.11 seconds. Almeida's record was beaten in 2013 by South African Chad le Clos, who improved the record to 1:49.04. A day later, he won another gold, beating the South American record for the 100-meter butterfly twice with times of 50.34 seconds in the heats and 49.44 seconds in the final.

=== 2010 ===
Almeida competed at the 2010 Pan Pacific Swimming Championships in Irvine, California, where he finished fifth in the 200-meter butterfly and 11th in the 100-meter butterfly.

At the 2010 FINA World Swimming Championships (25 m) in Dubai, Almeida won bronze in the 100-meter butterfly with a time of 50.33 seconds. In the 200-meter butterfly, he won silver with a time of 1:51.56 seconds. Along with teammates César Cielo, Felipe França and Guilherme Guido, Almeida broke the South American record for the 4×100-meter medley with a time of 3:23.12 seconds, winning the bronze medal.

=== 2011 ===
In the 2011 World Aquatics Championships held in Shanghai, Almeida finished 10th in the 200-meter butterfly, 25th in the 100-meter butterfly and 14th in the 4×100-meter medley. In the 2011 Pan American Games in Guadalajara, Almeida won the gold in the 4×100-meter medley and bronze in the 200-meter butterfly.

=== 2012 ===
At the 2012 Summer Olympics in London, Almeida finished 15th in the 4×100-meter medley, 17th in the 200-meter butterfly, and 28th in the 100-meter butterfly. At the 2012 FINA World Swimming Championships (25 m) in Istanbul, he finished fourth in the 4 × 100 meter medley, 11th in the 50-meter butterfly and 18th in the 100-meter butterfly.

=== Retirement and return ===
Almeida retired from swimming and tried to turn a politician, but returned to the pools.

=== 2015 ===
At the 2015 Pan American Games in Toronto, Ontario, Canada, Almeida won a gold medal in the 4×200-metre freestyle relay, by participating at heats. He also finished 5th in the 200 metre butterfly.

=== 2016 ===
At the 2016 Summer Olympics, he competed in the Men's 200-metre butterfly, going to the semifinals, finishing in 14th place.

=== 2018 ===
At the 2018 South American Swimming Championships in Trujillo, Peru, he won a silver medal in the 200 metre butterfly.

== Records ==
Kaio de Almeida is the current holder of the following records:

Race	Time	Date	Record	Pool
200m butterfly	1:53.92	8 May 2009	South American	Long Course
100m butterfly	49.44	11 November 2009	South American	Short Course
4 × 100 m medley	3:23.12	19 December 2010	South American	Short Course

Almeida is a former holder of the following records:

Race	Time	Date	Record	Pool
100m butterfly	51.64	6 May 2009	South American	Long Course
4 × 100 m medley	3:35.81	22 July 2007	South American	Long Course
50m butterfly	22.60	17 December 2005	World	Short Course
50m butterfly	22.44	10 November 2009	South American	Short Course
200m butterfly	1:49.11	10 November 2009	World	Short Course

== See also ==
- List of world records in swimming
- List of Pan American Games records in swimming
- List of South American records in swimming

Records
Preceded by (United States) Ian Crocker	Men's 50 metre butterfly world record holder (short course); 17 December 2005 – 25 October 2008	Succeeded by (Australia) Matt Jaukovic
Preceded by (Russia) Nikolay Skvortsov	Men's 200 metre butterfly world record holder (short course); 10 November 2009 – 7 August 2013	Succeeded by (South Africa) Chad le Clos
