= Tomoya Fukuda =

Japanese footballer

Tomoya Fukuda 福田友也
Personal information
- Full name: Tomoya Fukuda
- Date of birth: September 10, 1992 (age 34)
- Place of birth: Minano, Saitama, Japan
- Height: 1.82 m (5 ft 11 1/2 in)
- Position: Defender

Team information
- Current team: Shinagawa CC Yokohama

Youth career
- 2012–2015: Kokushikan University

Senior career*
Years	Team	Apps	(Gls)
2016–2017	Machida Zelvia	0	(0)
2017	→ Grulla Morioka (loan)	32	(1)
2018–2019	Grulla Morioka	66	(4)
2020–	Shinagawa CC Yokohama		
- * Club domestic league appearances and goals as of 23 February 2020

Tomoya Fukuda (福田友也, Fukuda Tomoya; born September 10, 1992) is a Japanese football player for Shinagawa CC Yokohama.

== Career statistics ==
Updated to 23 February 2020.

Appearances and goals by club, season and competition
Club	Season	League			Emperor's Cup		Total	
Club	Season	Division	Apps	Goals	Apps	Goals	Apps	Goals
Machida Zelvia	2016	J2 League	0	0	1	0	1	0
Grulla Morioka	2017	J3 League	32	1	2	0	34	1
Grulla Morioka	2018	J3 League	32	0	0	0	32	0
Grulla Morioka	2019	J3 League	34	4	1	0	35	4
Career total			98	5	4	0	102	5
