= Katheryn Meaklim =

South African swimmer (born 1989)

Personal information
- Born: July 20, 1989 (age 36) Johannesburg, South Africa

Sport
- Sport: Swimming
Medal record
Representing South Africa
African Games
Silver medal – second place	2011 Maputo	400m individual medley
Bronze medal – third place	2011 Maputo	200m individual medley

Katheryn Meaklim (born 20 July 1989) is a South African swimmer who mainly competes in the Women's 200 and 400 m individual medley.

At the 2008 Summer Olympics she competed in the 200 m butterfly, the 400 m individual medley and the 4 x 100 m freestyle relay.

At the 2012 Summer Olympics she finished 16th overall in the heats in the Women's 400 metre individual medley and failed to reach the final, and had the same result in the 200 m individual medley.

Meaklim is the daughter of Zimbabwean athlete Mariette Van Heerden.
