= Marieke D'Cruz =

Australian swimmer

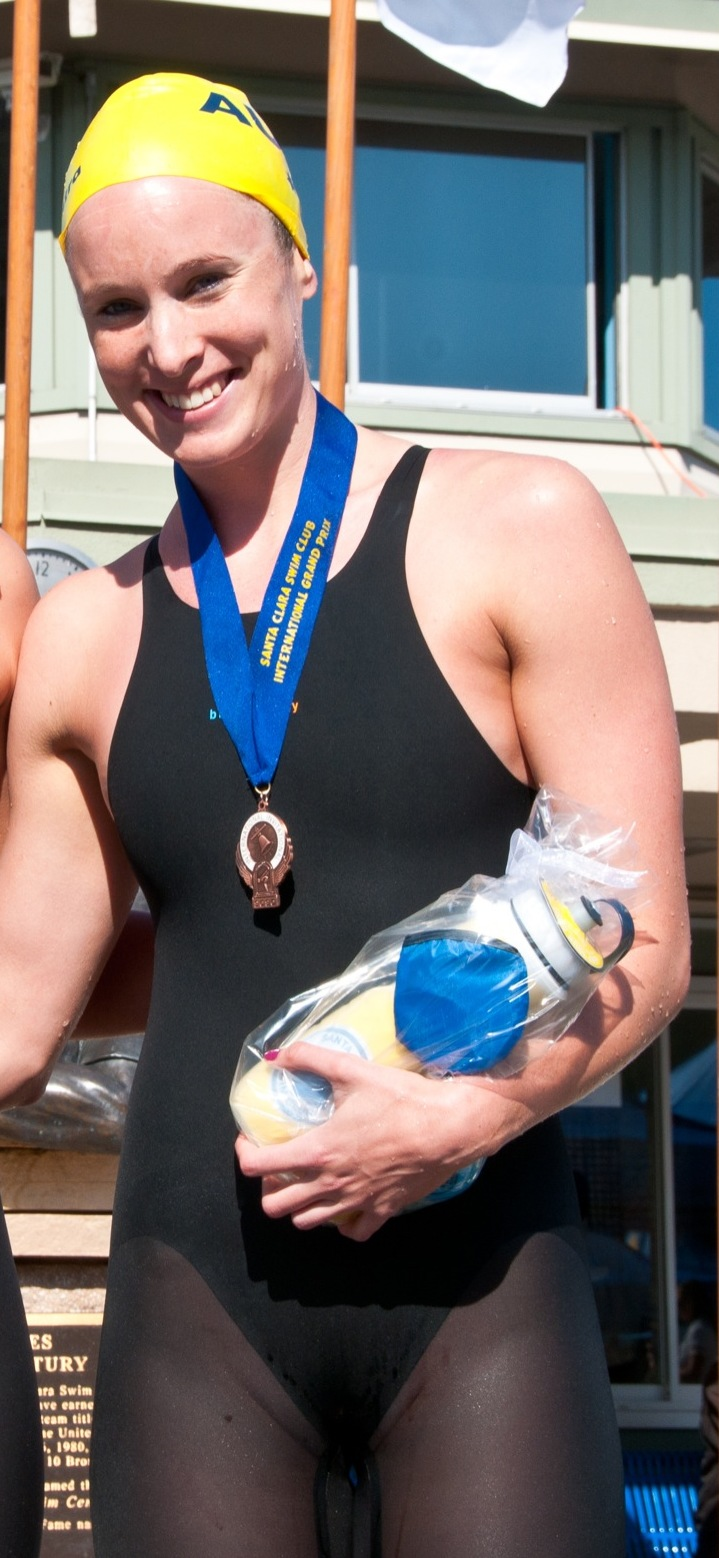

Personal information
- Full name: Marieke Katherine D'Cruz (née Guehrer)
- Nickname: MG
- Nationality: Australia
- Born: 9 February 1986 (age 40) Adelaide, South Australia, Australia
- Height: 1.85 m (6 ft 1 in)
- Weight: 74 kg (163 lb)

Sport
- Sport: Swimming
- Strokes: Backstroke, Butterfly, Freestyle
- Club: SOPAC
Medal record
Representing Australia
World Championships (LC)
Gold medal – first place	2009 Rome	50 m butterfly
Bronze medal – third place	2009 Rome	4×100 m freestyle
World Championships (SC)
Silver medal – second place	2012 Istanbul	4×100 m freestyle
Silver medal – second place	2012 Istanbul	4×100 m medley
Bronze medal – third place	2010 Dubai	4×100 m medley
Pan Pacific Championships
Gold medal – first place	2010 Irvine	50 m butterfly
Commonwealth Games
Gold medal – first place	2010 Delhi	4×100 m freestyle
Silver medal – second place	2010 Delhi	50 m butterfly
Universiade
Gold medal – first place	2011 Shenzhen	4×100 m freestyle
Silver medal – second place	2011 Shenzhen	50 m butterfly

Marieke Katherine D'Cruz (née Guehrer; born 9 February 1986) is an Australian swimmer who is the former world record holder in the 50 metres butterfly short course. She clocked 24.99 seconds

After her breakout meet in late 2008, D'Cruz broke her personal best times in several events, also breaking the short course 50 m butterfly world record. At the 2009 Telstra Aus trials, she earned an individual spot in the 100 m freestyle clocking 54.28 along with a spot on the 4×100 m freestyle relay team. The next day she clocked 25.60 s in the 50 m Butterfly, easily making the qualifying time and becoming the third fastest in history in that event, after some thunderous times posted in the semi-finals, the fasted qualifiers failed to match their times in the final, and Guehrer won gold.

At the 2009 World Aquatics Championships, D'Cruz picked up her first medal on day one with a bronze medal in the 4×100 m freestyle relay. With a tremendously fast semi-finals in the 50 m butterfly, from lane 6 Guehrer caused an upset capturing gold.

At the 2010 Commonwealth Games, D'Cruz won silver in the 50m butterfly final to Francesca Halsall and won gold in the 4×100 m freestyle relay.

== Career Best Times ==
- LONG COURSE (50m Pool)
  - 50m butterfly– 25.48 (Commonwealth Record)
  - 100m butterfly – 58.08
  - 50m freestyle – 24.87
- SHORT COURSE (25m Pool)
  - 50m butterfly– 24.69 (Commonwealth Record)
  - 50m freestyle – 23.74 (Commonwealth Record)
  - 50m backstroke – 25.98 (Commonwealth Record)
  - 50m butterfly 100m backstroke (Australian Record)

== See also ==
- List of World Aquatics Championships medalists in swimming (women)
- List of Commonwealth Games medallists in swimming (women)
- World record progression 50 metres backstroke
- World record progression 50 metres butterfly

Records
Preceded by Therese Alshammar	Women's 50 metre butterfly world record holder (short course); 15 November 2008 – 17 October 2009	Succeeded by Therese Alshammar
Preceded by Sanja Jovanović	Women's 50 metre backstroke world record holder (short course); 6 November 2009 – 10 November 2009	Succeeded by Zhao Jing
Sporting positions
Preceded by Therese Alshammar	Female World Cup Overall Winner; 2008	Succeeded by Jessica Hardy
