= Algeria at the 2011 Arab Games =

- IOC code: ALG
- NOC: Algerian Olympic Committee

in Algeria December 9, 2011 – December 23, 2011
- Competitors: 211 in 18 sports
- Medals Ranked 5th: Gold 16 Silver 31 Bronze 41 Total 88

Arab Games appearances (overview)
- 1965; 1976; 1985; 1992; 1997; 1999; 2004; 2007; 2011; 2023; 2027

Algeria participated at the 12th Arab Games in Doha, Qatar, from 9 to 23 December 2011. Its delegation was expected to include 211 athletes competing in 18 sports.

Algeria has previously participated in 7 editions (1965, 1985, 1992, 1997, 1999, 2004, 2007), and is third in the overall standings before the start of this edition.

== Medals ==
=== Medals by sport ===
Algeria finished fifth in the overall standings, winning 88 medals, including 16 gold, 31 silver and 41 bronze.

Sport	Gold	Silver	Bronze	Total
Judo	3	6	6	15
Athletics	3	3	3	9
Karate	2	4	5	11
Gymnastics	2	0	2	4
Chess	2	0	0	2
Swimming	1	9	6	16
Cycling	1	1	3	5
Shooting	1	1	0	2
Handball	1	0	0	1
Weightlifting	0	3	0	3
Boxing	0	2	5	7
Wrestling	0	1	4	5
Volleyball	0	1	1	2
Sailing	0	0	4	4
Taekwondo	0	0	2	2
Totals (15 entries)	16	31	41	88

=== Medalists ===
==== Judo ====
Medal	Name	Event	Date
Gold	Amar Benikhlef	Men's 90 kg	10 December
Gold	Meriem Moussa	Women's 57 kg	11 December
Gold	Sonia Asselah	Women's Open	12 December
Silver	Amina Temmar	Women's 78 kg	10 December
Silver	Sonia Asselah	Women's +78 kg	10 December
Silver	Kahina Saidi	Women's 63 kg	11 December
Silver	El Arbi Grini	Men's 73 kg	11 December
Silver	Sabrina Saidi	Women's 48 kg	12 December
Silver	Lyes Saker	Men's 60 kg	12 December
Bronze	Yacine Meskine	Men's 100 kg	10 December
Bronze	Bilel Zouani	Men's +100 kg	10 December
Bronze	Abderrahmane Benamadi	Men's 81 kg	11 December
Bronze	Aicha Benabderahmane	Women's 70 kg	11 December
Bronze	Mohamed Tayeb	Men's Open	12 December
Bronze	Soraya Haddad	Women's 52 kg	12 December

==== Athletics ====
Medal	Name	Event	Date
Gold	Tahani Romaissa Belabiod	Long Jump Women	16 December
Gold	Baya Rahouli	Triple Jump Women	19 December
Gold	Issam Nima	Triple Jump Men	20 December
Silver	Amina Ferguen	100m Hurdles Women	15 December
Silver	Miloud Rahmani	400m Hurdles Men	17 December
Silver	Othman Hadj Lazib	110m Hurdles Men	20 December
Bronze	Tahani Romaissa Belabiod	100m Hurdles Women	15 December
Bronze	Mourad Souissi	Decathlon Men	20 December
Bronze	Fassila Fnides; Djamila Bensalem; Asma Amar-Belhadj; Houria Moussa	4 × 400 m Women	20 December

==== Karate ====
Medal	Name	Event	Date
Gold	Kamelia Manal Hadj Said	Women's Kata Individual	19 December
Gold	Nabil Hamidouche	Men's Kumite -84kg	20 December
Silver	Ilhem Eldjou	Women's Kumite -55kg	19 December
Silver	Nesrine Kherrar	Women's Kumite -61kg	20 December
Silver	Zahira Abdelkader	Women's Kumite -68kg	20 December
Silver	Selma Bedja; Kamelia Manal Hadj Said; Yasmine Mouloud	Women's Kata team	20 December
Bronze	Wualid Bouabaoub	Men's Kumite -75kg	19 December
Bronze	Dyhia Chikhi	Women's Kumite -50kg	19 December
Bronze	Missipsa Hamadini	Men's Kumite +84kg	20 December
Bronze	Wualid Bouabaoub; Chaffik Boualaouad; Abdelkrim Bouamria; Abderezak Boucetta; Houssam Halouane; Missipsa Hamadini; Nabil Hamidouche	Men's Kumite team	21 December
Bronze	Zahira Abdelkader; Fatma Zohra Chibaoui; Ilhem Eldjou; Nesrine Kherrar	Women's Kumite team	21 December

==== Gymnastics ====
Medal	Name	Event	Date
Gold	Sid Ali Ferdjani	Men's Parallel Bars	14 December
Gold	Tewfik Chikhi	Men's Trampoline Individual	20 December
Bronze	Amine Airour; Sid Ali Ferdjani; Mohamed Amir Hacib; Hillal Metidji; Belkacem Tahi	Men's Team All-Around	10 December
Bronze	Hillal Metidji	Men's Individual All-Around	12 December

==== Chess ====
Medal	Name	Event	Date
Gold	Mohamed Haddouche	Men's Individual Rapid	12 December
Gold	Amina Mezioud; Amira Hamza; Khadidja Latreche; Sabrina Latreche; Zineb Dina Abdi	Women's Team Classical	22 December

==== Swimming ====
Medal	Name	Event	Date
Gold	Amel Melih	Women, 100m Backstroke	21 December
Silver	Fella Bennaceur	Women, 100m Butterfly	17 December
Silver	Nabil Kebbab	Men, 50m Freestyle	19 December
Silver	Nabil Kebbab	Men, 100m Breaststroke	19 December
Silver	Amel Melih	Women, 50m Backstroke	19 December
Silver	Nesrine Khelifatie	Women, 200m Butterfly	19 December
Silver	Nabil Kebbab; Jugurtha Boumali; Badis Djendouci; Oussama Sahnoune; Ryad Djendouci*	Men, 4 × 100 m Freestyle	20 December
Silver	Fella Bennaceur; Malia Meghazi Bakhouch; Souad Cherouatie; Nesrine Khelifatie	Women, 4 × 200 m Freestyle	20 December
Silver	Oussama Sahnoune	Men, 100m Freestyle	21 December
Silver	Fella Bennaceur	Women, 50m Butterfly	22 December
Bronze	Fella Bennaceur; Amel Melih; Malia Meghazi Bakhouch; Souad Cherouatie	Women, 4 × 100 m Freestyle	18 December
Bronze	Nabil Kebbab	Men, 50m Breaststroke	18 December
Bronze	Fella Bennaceur	Women, 50m Backstroke	19 December
Bronze	Sarah Hadj Abderrahmane	Women, 200m Butterfly	19 December
Bronze	Fella Bennaceur	Women, 100m Backstroke	21 December
Bronze	Nabil Kebbab	Men, 100m Freestyle	21 December

==== Cycling ====
Medal	Name	Event	Date
Gold	Azzedine Lagab; Abdelmalek Madani; Youcef Reguigui	Men's Team Road Race	23 December
Silver	Azzedine Lagab	Men's Individual Road Race	23 December
Bronze	Abdelah Benyoucef; Abderrahmane Bourezza; Azzedine Lagab; Abdelmalek Madani	Men's Team Time Trial	19 December
Bronze	Azzedine Lagab	Men's Individual Time Trial	21 December
Bronze	Youcef Reguigui	Men's Individual Road Race	23 December

==== Shooting ====
Medal	Name	Event	Date
Gold	Amine Adjabi	Men's 10m Air Pistol	12 December
Silver	Amine Abjabi; Fateh Ziadi	Men's 10m Air Pistol Team	12 December

==== Weightlifting ====
Medal	Name	Event	Date
Silver	Kenza Filali	Women's -53kg	13 December
Silver	Touria Kendouci	Women's +75kg	15 December
Silver	Amir Belhout	Men's -77kg	16 December

==== Boxing ====
Medal	Name	Event	Date
Silver	Sid Ali Berrag	Men -64kg	20 December
Silver	Abdelatif Sahnoune	Men -91kg	20 December
Bronze	Ahmed Meziane	Men -49kg	20 December
Bronze	Reda Benbaziz	Men -56kg	20 December
Bronze	Saad Kadous	Men -75kg	20 December
Bronze	Zohir Kedache	Men -69kg	21 December
Bronze	Kamel Rahmani	Men +91kg	21 December

==== Wrestling ====
Medal	Name	Event	Date
Silver	Messaoud Zeghdane	Greco-Roman 84kg	16 December
Bronze	Mohammed Bouterfassa	Greco-Roman 55kg	16 December
Bronze	Mohamed Serir	Greco-Roman 66kg	16 December
Bronze	Tarek Aziz Benaissa	Greco-Roman 60kg	17 December
Bronze	Rabah Siramdane	Freestyle 66kg	19 December

==== Sailing ====
Medal	Name	Event	Date
Bronze	Riyadh Djemai	Laser Men	19 December
Bronze	Billel Nedjari	Laser 4.7 Open	19 December
Bronze	Mohamed Midoun	Laser Radial Open	19 December
Bronze	Ismahane Horch	Optimist Women	20 December

==== Taekwondo ====
Medal	Name	Event	Date
Bronze	Sid Ali Larbi Cherif	Men's -74kg	14 December
Bronze	Linda Azzeddine	Women's +73kg	17 December

=== Medals by gender ===
Medals by gender
Gender	1st place, gold medalist(s)	2nd place, silver medalist(s)	3rd place, bronze medalist(s)	Total	Percentage
Male	8	14	27	49	55.68%
Female	8	17	12	37	42.05%
Mixed	0	0	2	2	2.27%
Total	16	31	41	88	100%

=== Medals by date ===
Medals by date
Day	Date	1st place, gold medalist(s)	2nd place, silver medalist(s)	3rd place, bronze medalist(s)	Total
1	10 December	1	2	3	6
2	11 December	1	2	2	5
3	12 December	3	3	3	9
4	13 December	0	1	0	1
5	14 December	1	0	1	2
6	15 December	0	2	1	3
7	16 December	1	2	2	5
8	17 December	0	2	2	4
9	18 December	0	0	2	2
10	19 December	2	5	9	16
11	20 December	3	8	7	18
12	21 December	2	2	7	11
13	22 December	1	1	1	3
14	23 December	1	1	1	3
Total		16	31	41	88

=== Multiple medalists ===
Multiple medalists
Name	Sport	1st place, gold medalist(s)	2nd place, silver medalist(s)	3rd place, bronze medalist(s)	Total
Fella Bennaceur	Swimming	0	3	3	6
Nabil Kebbab	Swimming	0	3	2	5
Azzedine Lagab	Cycling	1	1	2	4
Amel Melih	Swimming	1	1	1	3
Kamelia Manal Hadj Said	Karate	1	1	0	2
Sonia Asselah	Judo	1	1	0	2
Amine Adjabi	Shooting	1	1	0	2
Nabil Hamidouche	Karate	1	0	1	2
Abdelmalek Madani	Cycling	1	0	1	2
Youcef Reguigui	Cycling	1	0	1	2
Tahani Romaissa Belabiod	Athletics	1	0	1	2
Sid Ali Ferdjani	Gymnastics	1	0	1	2
Nesrine Khelifatie	Swimming	0	2	0	2
Oussama Sahnoune	Swimming	0	2	0	2
Ilhem Eldjou	Karate	0	1	1	2
Nesrine Kherrar	Karate	0	1	1	2
Zahira Abdelkader	Karate	0	1	1	2
Malia Meghazi Bakhouch	Swimming	0	1	1	2
Souad Cherouatie	Swimming	0	1	1	2
Hillal Metidji	Gymnastics	0	0	2	2
Wualid Bouabaoub	Karate	0	0	2	2
Missipsa Hamadini	Karate	0	0	2	2

== Handball ==
=== Women ===
==== Final round ====
Team	Pld	W	D	L	GF	GA	GD	Pts
Algeria	6	5	1	0	221	85	+136	11
Tunisia	6	4	1	1	240	94	+146	9
Jordan	6	2	0	4	93	212	−119	4
Qatar	6	0	0	6	73	236	−163	0

Source: Official website

13 December; 18:00	Tunisia	16–23	Algeria	Aspire Zone - Women's Indoor Hall, Doha
13 December; 18:00		(11–9)		Aspire Zone - Women's Indoor Hall, Doha

14 December; 18:00	Qatar	9–46	Algeria	Aspire Zone - Women's Indoor Hall, Doha
14 December; 18:00		(4–22)		Aspire Zone - Women's Indoor Hall, Doha

16 December; 16:00	Algeria	45–9	Jordan	Aspire Zone - Women's Indoor Hall, Doha
16 December; 16:00		(20–7)		Aspire Zone - Women's Indoor Hall, Doha

18 December; 16:00	Algeria	29–29	Tunisia	Aspire Zone - Women's Indoor Hall, Doha
18 December; 16:00		(15–12)		Aspire Zone - Women's Indoor Hall, Doha

19 December; 14:00	Algeria	43-8	Qatar	Aspire Zone - Women's Indoor Hall, Doha
19 December; 14:00		(21-2)		Aspire Zone - Women's Indoor Hall, Doha

21 December; 11:00	Jordan	14–35	Algeria	Aspire Zone - Women's Indoor Hall, Doha
21 December; 11:00		(3–17)		Aspire Zone - Women's Indoor Hall, Doha

== Volleyball ==
=== Men's ===
==== Preliminary round ====
Pos	Team	Pld	W	L	Pts	SPW	SPL	SPR	SW	SL	SR
1	Egypt	5	5	0	10	421	300	1.403	15	1	15.000
2	Algeria	5	4	1	9	349	284	1.229	12	3	4.000
3	Bahrain	5	3	2	8	375	346	1.084	10	6	1.667
4	Jordan	5	2	3	7	355	388	0.915	6	11	0.545
5	Iraq	5	1	4	6	344	438	0.785	5	14	0.357
6	Sudan	5	0	5	5	336	424	0.792	3	15	0.200

Source: Official website

Date	Time		Score		Set 1	Set 2	Set 3	Set 4	Set 5	Total
10 Dec	17:00	Algeria	3–0	Jordan	25–23	25–22	25–17			75–62
11 Dec	17:00	Sudan	0–3	Algeria	20–25	15–25	11–25			46–75
13 Dec	15:00	Algeria	3–0	Bahrain	25–22	25–19	25–18			75–59
15 Dec	17:00	Egypt	3–0	Algeria	25–16	25–11	25–22			75–49
17 Dec	13:00	Algeria	3-0	Iraq	25–12	25–16	25–14			75–42

===== Semifinals =====
Date	Time		Score		Set 1	Set 2	Set 3	Set 4	Set 5	Total
19 Dec	19:00	Algeria	0–3	Qatar	20–25	21–25	20–25			61–75

===== Bronze medal match =====
Date	Time		Score		Set 1	Set 2	Set 3	Set 4	Set 5	Total
22 Dec	17:00	Kuwait	0–3	Algeria	23–25	17–25	24–26			64–76

=== Women's ===
==== Final round ====
Pos	Team	Pld	W	L	Pts	SPW	SPL	SPR	SW	SL	SR
1	Egypt	4	4	0	8	322	174	1.851	12	1	12.000
2	Algeria	4	3	1	7	312	171	1.825	10	3	3.333
3	United Arab Emirates	4	2	2	6	218	207	1.053	6	6	1.000
4	Kuwait	4	1	3	5	169	313	0.540	3	10	0.300
5	Qatar	4	0	4	4	167	323	0.517	1	12	0.083

Source: Official website

Date	Time		Score		Set 1	Set 2	Set 3	Set 4	Set 5	Total
14 Dec	15:00	Algeria	3–0	Qatar	25–7	25–4	25–5			75–16
16 Dec	13:00	United Arab Emirates	0–3	Algeria	8–25	14–25	11–25			33–75
18 Dec	12:00	Kuwait	0–3	Algeria	9–25	11–25	5–25			25–75
21 Dec	19:00	Algeria	1–3	Egypt	25–22	23–25	19–25	20–25		87–97

== Basketball ==
=== Men ===
source: Official website

==== First phase ====
Team	Pld	W	L	PF	PA	PD	Pts
Algeria	3	3	0	254	178	+76	6
Egypt	3	2	1	272	196	+76	5
Iraq	3	1	2	216	237	−21	4
Sudan	3	0	3	253	284	−131	3

December 10
13:15

Algeria	85–68	Iraq
Scoring by quarter: 24−17, 31−15, 12−15, 18−21

Al Gharafa Sports Club-Indoor Hall, Doha

December 11
17:45

Sudan	37–88	Algeria
Scoring by quarter: 2−21, 13−29, 12−17, 10−21

Al Gharafa Sports Club-Indoor Hall, Doha

December 14
17:45

Egypt	73–81	Algeria
Scoring by quarter: 18−13, 20−17, 17−24, 18−27

Al Gharafa Sports Club-Indoor Hall, Doha

==== Second phase ====
Team	Pld	W	L	PF	PA	PD	Pts
Jordan	2	2	0	155	139	+16	4
Qatar	2	1	1	138	133	+5	3
Algeria	2	0	2	124	145	-21	2

December 18
17:45

Jordan	78–68	Algeria
Scoring by quarter: 13−10, 17−28, 22−14, 26−16

Al Gharafa Sports Club-Indoor Hall, Doha

December 20
13:15

Algeria	56–67	Qatar
Scoring by quarter: 8−17, 15−12, 17−15, 16−23

Al Gharafa Sports Club-Indoor Hall, Doha

===== Placings 5th–6th =====
December 21
13:15

Algeria	92–79	Kuwait
Scoring by quarter: 25−22, 29−16, 12−24, 26−17

Al Gharafa Sports Club-Indoor Hall, Doha

== Paralympic ==
=== Medals by sport ===
Sport	Gold	Silver	Bronze	Total
athletics	4	5	2	11
Goalball	0	1	0	1
Totals (2 entries)	4	6	2	12

=== Medalists ===
==== Athletics ====
Medal	Name	Event	Date
Gold	Nassima Saifi	Women's Discus throw F57/58	21 December
Gold	Saifa Djalel	Women's Shot put F57/58	21 December
Gold	Sofiane Hamdi	Men's 100m T37	21 December
Gold	Madjid Djemai	Men's 1500m T37	22 December
Silver	Nadia Medjmedj	Women's Discus throw F57/58	21 December
Silver	Souheila Hariki	Women's Shot put F32/33/34	21 December
Silver	Nadia Medjmedj	Women's Shot put F57/58	21 December
Silver	Redhouane Ait Said	Men's Shot put F57/58	22 December
Silver	Kheireddine Ougour	Men's Discus throw F42	22 December
Bronze	Nassima Saifi	Women's Shot put F57/58	21 December
Bronze	Brahim Bouzertini	Men's Shot put F42	21 December

=== Medals by gender ===
Medals by gender
Gender	1st place, gold medalist(s)	2nd place, silver medalist(s)	3rd place, bronze medalist(s)	Total	Percentage
Male	2	3	1	6	50%
Female	2	3	1	6	50%
Total	4	6	2	12	100%

=== Medals by date ===
Medals by date
Day	Date	1st place, gold medalist(s)	2nd place, silver medalist(s)	3rd place, bronze medalist(s)	Total
1	20 December	0	1	0	1
2	21 December	3	3	2	8
3	22 December	1	2	0	3
Total		4	6	2	12

=== Multiple medalists ===
Multiple medalists
Name	Sport	1st place, gold medalist(s)	2nd place, silver medalist(s)	3rd place, bronze medalist(s)	Total
Nassima Saifi	Athletics	1	0	1	2
Nadia Medjmedj	Athletics	0	2	0	2

== Goalball ==
=== Group stage ===
Qualified for the quarterfinals

Team	W	D	L	GF	GA	GD
Algeria	5	0	0	55	7	+48
Egypt	4	0	1	49	21	+28
Qatar	3	0	2	39	29	+10
Palestine	2	0	3	26	45	-19
Sudan	1	0	4	18	49	-31
Lebanon	0	0	5	21	57	-36

Source: Official website

2011-12-13
Algeria	10-0	Palestine
2011-12-14
Algeria	10-0	Sudan
2011-12-15
Algeria	13-3	Qatar
2011-12-16
Algeria	11-1	Lebanon
2011-12-17
Algeria	11-3	Egypt

=== Quarterfinals ===
2011-12-19
Algeria	6-1	Libya

=== Semifinals ===
2011-12-20
Algeria	8-1	Saudi Arabia

=== Gold medal game ===
2011-12-20
Iraq	5-2	Algeria
