= List of Tunisian records in swimming =

The Tunisian records in swimming are the fastest ever performances of swimmers from Tunisia, which are recognised and ratified by the Federation Tunisienne de Natation (FTN).

All records were set in finals unless noted otherwise.

== Long Course (50 m) ==
=== Men ===
Event	Time		Name	Club	Date	Meet	Location	Ref
50 m freestyle	23.03		Oussama Mellouli	Tunisia	19 December 2011	Pan Arab Games	Doha, Qatar	
100 m freestyle	49.55		Oussama Mellouli	Tunisia	21 December 2011	Pan Arab Games	Doha, Qatar	
200 m freestyle	1:46.44		Oussama Mellouli	Tunisia	30 June 2009	Mediterranean Games	Pescara, Italy	
400 m freestyle	3:40.70	AF	Ahmed Hafnaoui	Tunisia	23 July 2023	World Championships	Fukuoka, Japan	
800 m freestyle	7:35.27	AF	Oussama Mellouli	Tunisia	29 July 2009	World Championships	Rome, Italy	
1500 m freestyle	14:31.54	AF	Ahmed Hafnaoui	Tunisia	30 July 2023	World Championships	Fukuoka, Japan	
50 m backstroke	26.65		Oussama Mellouli	Tunisia	29 September 2004	Pan Arab Games	Algiers, Algeria	
100 m backstroke	55.69	b	Mohamed-Yassine Ben Abbes	Grenoble Alp'38	15 June 2025	French Championships	Montpellier, France	
200 m backstroke	1:58.35		Mohamed-Yassine Ben Abbes	Grenoble Alp'38	17 June 2025	French Championships	Montpellier, France	
50 m breaststroke	28.02		Adnan Beji	Tunisia	23 August 2022	African Championships	Tunis, Tunisia	
100 m breaststroke	1:01.26		Wassim Elloumi	Tunisia	10 September 2018	African Championships	Algiers, Algeria	
200 m breaststroke	2:14.35	b	Wassim Elloumi	SO Millau	28 May 2017	French Championships	Schiltigheim, France	
50m butterfly	24.67	h	Belhassen Ben Miled	SC Thionvillois	27 June 2026	French Championships	Saint-Étienne, France	
100m butterfly	53.73		Oussama Mellouli	Tunisia	18 December 2011	Pan Arab Games	Doha, Qatar	
200m butterfly	1:58.12		Oussama Mellouli	-	9 April 2011	-	Michigan, United States	
200m individual medley	1:58.38		Oussama Mellouli	Tunisia	27 June 2009	Mediterranean Games	Pescara, Italy	
400m individual medley	4:10.53	AF	Oussama Mellouli	Tunisia	29 June 2009	Mediterranean Games	Pescara, Italy	
4 × 100 m freestyle relay	3:23.87		Taki Mrabet; Talel M'Rabet; Ahmed Mathlouthi; Oussama Mellouli	Tunisia	20 December 2011	Pan Arab Games	Doha, Qatar	
4 × 200 m freestyle relay	7:21.56		Farouk Ben Jeddi (1:52.44); Ahmed Mathlouthi (1:47.38); Taki Mrabet (1:54.29); Oussama Mellouli (1:47.45)	Tunisia	29 June 2009	Mediterranean Games	Pescara, Italy	
4 × 100 m medley relay	3:46.67		Taki Mrabet; Wassim Elloumi; Oussama Mellouli; Ahmed Mathlouthi	Tunisia	22 December 2011	Pan Arab Games	Doha, Qatar	

Legend: # – Record awaiting ratification by FTN; WR – World record; AF – African record; e – equalled existing record;
Records not set in finals: h – heat; sf – semifinal; r – relay 1st leg; rh – relay heat 1st leg; b – B final; † – en route to final mark; so – swim-off; tt – time trial

=== Women ===
Event	Time		Name	Club	Date	Meet	Location	Ref
50 m freestyle	26.32		Senda Gharbi	-	-	-		
100 m freestyle	57.33		Zeineb Khalfalah	-	28 September 2011	-	Algiers, Algeria	
200 m freestyle	2:03.78	h	Rim Quenniche	Amiens Métropole Natation	25 May 2017	French Championships	Schiltigheim, France	
400 m freestyle	4:13.50		Jamila Boulakbech	Martigues Natation	2 July 2026	French Championships	Saint-Étienne, France	
800 m freestyle	8:44.01		Jamila Boulakbech	Martigues Natation	27 May 2026	Mare Nostrum	Canet-en-Roussillon, France	
1500 m freestyle	16:46.56		Jamila Boulakbech	Tunisia	22 August 2026	Mediterranean Games	Taranto, Italy	
50 m backstroke	29.98		Farah Benkhelil	Tunisia	13 July 2018	Arab Championships	Rades, Tunisia	
50 m backstroke	29.90	#	Kenza Chachay	Speedo Swim Squads	8 February 2026	Dubai Open Championships	Dubai, United Arab Emirates	
100 m backstroke	1:03.58	b	Rim Ouennich	Tunisia	25 May 2018	French Championships	Saint-Raphaël, France	
200 m backstroke	2:19.10		Rim Ouennich	Tunisia	4 April 2016	6th Dubai International Championships	Dubai, United Arab Emirates	
50m breaststroke	32.35		Habiba Belghith	AL Wasl	15 February 2025	Dubai Open Championships	Dubai, United Arab Emirates	
100m breaststroke	1:10.60		Sarra Lajnef	Tunisia	26 July 2009	World Championships	Rome, Italy	
200m breaststroke	2:29.55		Sarra Lajnef	Tunisia	29 June 2009	Mediterranean Games	Pescara, Italy	
50m butterfly	28.33		Roua Ben Fradj	Tunisia	21 August 2022	African Championships	Tunis, Tunisia	
100m butterfly	1:02.61		Roua Ben Fradj	Tunisia	22 August 2022	African Championships	Tunis, Tunisia	
200m butterfly	2:18.69		Nesrine Khelifeti	Tunisia	18 September 2010	African Championships	Casablanca, Morocco	
200m individual medley	2:17.81		Sarra Lajnef	Tunisia	27 June 2009	Mediterranean Games	Pescara, Italy	
400m individual medley	4:51.37		Sarra Lajnef	-	30 June 2011	-	Glasgow, Scotland	
4 × 100 m freestyle relay	3:55.76		Zeineb Khalfallah; Myriam Meddeb; Farah Ben Khelil; Sarra Lajnef	Tunisia	18 December 2011	Pan Arab Games	Doha, Qatar	
4 × 200 m freestyle relay	8:31.71		Sendo Ayari; Sarra Lajnef; Maroua Mathlouthi; Zaineb Khalfallah	Tunisia	13 September 2010	African Championships	Casablanca, Morocco	
4 × 100 m medley relay	4:21.49		Rim Ouennich (1:05.63); Habiba Belghith (1:14.19); Ines Barbouch (1:04.10); Farah Benkhelil (57.57)	Tunisia	14 July 2018	Arab Championships	Rades, Tunisia	

Legend: # – Record awaiting ratification by FTN; WR – World record; AF – African record; e – equalled existing record;
Records not set in finals: h – heat; sf – semifinal; r – relay 1st leg; rh – relay heat 1st leg; b – B final; † – en route to final mark; so – swim-off; tt – time trial

=== Mixed relay ===
Event	Time	Name	Club	Date	Meet	Location	Ref
4 × 100 m freestyle relay	3:38.90	Mohamed Aziz Ghaffari (50.99); Rim Ouennich (59.04); Farah Ben Khelil (58.61); Mehdi Lagili (50.26)	Tunisia	12 July 2018	Arab Championships	Rades, Tunisia	
4 × 100 m medley relay	4:03.41	Rim Ouennich (1:05.37); Wassim Elloumi (1:02.96); Asma Sammoud (1:03.60); Mohamed Mehdi Laagili (51.48)	Tunisia	10 September 2015	African Games	Brazzaville, Congo	

Legend: # – Record awaiting ratification by FTN; WR – World record; AF – African record; e – equalled existing record;
Records not set in finals: h – heat; so – swim-off

== Short Course (25 m) ==
=== Men ===
Event	Time		Name	Club	Date	Meet	Location	Ref
50 m freestyle	22.83		Ahmed Mathlouthi	-	27 December 2009	Tunisian Winter Championships	Tunis, Tunisia	
100 m freestyle	48.87		Oussama Mellouli	-	17 December 2005	-	Mennecy, United States	
200 m freestyle	1:42.02		Oussama Mellouli	Tunisia	15 December 2010	World Championships	Dubai, United Arab Emirates	
400 m freestyle	3:36.75	AF	Oussama Mellouli	Tunisia	15 November 2008	World Cup	Berlin, Germany	
800 m freestyle	7:31.93	AF	Ahmed Jaouadi	Tunisia	14 December 2024	World Championships	Budapest, Hungary	
1500 m freestyle	14:10.94	AF	Ahmed Hafnaoui	Tunisia	21 December 2021	World Championships	Abu Dhabi, United Arab Emirates	
50m backstroke	25.42		Oussama Mellouli	-	27 December 2011	Tunisian Winter Championships	Tunis, Tunisia	
100m backstroke	52.55		Oussama Mellouli	-	29 December 2011	Tunisian Winter Championships	Tunis, Tunisia	
200m backstroke	1:54.27		Mohamed-Yassine Ben Abbes	Tunisia	29 October 2026	French Championships	Angers, France	
50m breaststroke	27.34	sf	Adnane Beji	University of Nevada	18 October 2024	UNLV vs Simon Fraser Dual Meet	Las Vegas, United States	
100m breaststroke	59.55		Adnane Beji	Vojvodina	8 November 2020	Mladost Meet	Zagreb, Croatia	
200m breaststroke	2:09.62		Adnane Beji	Tunisia	13 December 2019	French Championships	Angers, France	
50m butterfly	24.25		Oussama Mellouli	-	28 December 2011	Tunisian Winter Championships	Tunis, Tunisia	
100m butterfly	53.16	h	Émile Fouzaï	ZPC Amersfoort	21 December 2024	Dutch Championships	Den Haag, Netherlands	
200m butterfly	1:57.69		Émile Fouzaï	ZPC Amersfoort	20 December 2024	Dutch Championships	Den Haag, Netherlands	
100m individual medley	52.78		Oussama Mellouli	Tunisia	11 November 2008	World Cup	Stockholm, Sweden	
200m individual medley	1:52.41		Oussama Mellouli	Tunisia	16 November 2008	World Cup	Berlin, Germany	
400m individual medley	3:57.40	AF	Oussama Mellouli	Trojan Swim Club	16 December 2010	World Championships	Dubai, United Arab Emirates	
4 × 50 m freestyle relay								
4 × 100 m freestyle relay	3:20:12		Mohamed Ayoub Hafnaoui; Mohamed Mahdi Laajili; Mohamed Aziz Ghaffari; Mohamed Ali Chouachi	Tunisia	29 December 2011	Tunisian Winter Championships	Tunis, Tunisia	
4 × 200 m freestyle relay	7:08:32		Mohamed Ayoub Hafnaoui; Mohamed Mahdi Laajili; Mohamed Aziz Ghaffari; Mohamed Ali Chouachi	Tunisia	28 December 2019	Tunisian Winter Championships	Tunis, Tunisia	
4 × 50 m medley relay								
4 × 100 m medley relay	3:34.04			Tunisia	30 December 2011	Tunisian Winter Championships	Tunis, Tunisia	

Legend: # – Record awaiting ratification by FTN; WR – World record; AF – African record; e – equalled existing record;
Records not set in finals: h – heat; sf – semifinal; r – relay 1st leg; rh – relay heat 1st leg; b – B final; † – en route to final mark; so – swim-off; tt – time trial

=== Women ===
Event	Time		Name	Club	Date	Meet	Location	Ref
50 m freestyle	26.12		Senda Gharbi	Tunisia	1989	-	Tunis, Tunisia	
100 m freestyle	56.36		Senda Gharbi	Tunisia	1987	-	Tunis, Tunisia	
200 m freestyle	2:01.83		Maroua Mathlouthi	Tunisia	13 April 2008	World Championships	Manchester, Great Britain	
400 m freestyle	4:16.09		Jamila Boulakbeche	Martigues Natation	26 October 2025	French Championships	Taverny, France	
800 m freestyle	8:40.47		Jamila Boulakbeche	Martigues Natation	25 October 2025	French Championships	Taverny, France	
1500 m freestyle	16:30.18		Jamila Boulakbeche	Martigues Natation	23 October 2025	French Championships	Taverny, France	
50 m backstroke	29.47		Rim Oueniche	-	27 December 2019	Tunisian Winter Championships	Tunis, Tunisia	
100 m backstroke	1:02.24		Leslie Belkacemi	EST	25 December 2018	Tunisian Winter Championships	El Menzah, Tunisia	
200 m backstroke	2:16.60		Maroua Mathlouthi	-	25 December 2008	Tunisian Winter Championships	Tunis, Tunisia	
50 m breaststroke	31.78		Sarra Lajnef	-	29 December 2009	Tunisian Winter Championships	Tunis, Tunisia	
100 m breaststroke	1:08.10		Habiba Belghith	Olympica	25 December 2025	Tunisian Winter Championships	Tunis, Tunisia	
200 m breaststroke	2:28.13		Sarra Lajnef	-	30 December 2009	Tunisian Winter Championships	Tunis, Tunisia	
50 m butterfly	28.35		Ines Barbouch	Mouettes De Paris	24 October 2021	National Meeting of Autumn Paris	Paris, France	
100 m butterfly	1:02.35		Mariem Meddeb	-	4 December 2009	-	Chartres, France	
200 m butterfly	2:18.30		Mariem Meddeb	-	16 January 2005	-	Dunkerque, France	
100m individual medley	1:03.20	h	Sarra Lajnef	Tunisia	16 December 2010	World Championships	Dubai, United Arab Emirates	
200m individual medley	2:13.76	h	Sarra Lajnef	Tunisia	18 December 2010	World Championships	Dubai, United Arab Emirates	
400m individual medley	4:45.40	h	Sarra Lajnef	Tunisia	15 December 2010	World Championships	Dubai, United Arab Emirates	
4 × 50 m freestyle relay								
4 × 100 m freestyle relay	3:59.57			Tunisia	29 December 2011	Tunisian Winter Championships	Tunis, Tunisia	
4 × 200 m freestyle relay	8:38.15			Tunisia	28 December 2011	Tunisian Winter Championships	Tunis, Tunisia	
4 × 50 m medley relay								
4 × 100 m medley relay	4:23.71			Tunisia	29 December 2009	Tunisian Winter Championships	Tunis, Tunisia	

Legend: # – Record awaiting ratification by FTN; WR – World record; AF – African record; e – equalled existing record;
Records not set in finals: h – heat; sf – semifinal; r – relay 1st leg; rh – relay heat 1st leg; b – B final; † – en route to final mark; so – swim-off; tt – time trial
