= Judo at the 2018 Mediterranean Games – Men's 60 kg =

Judo competitions

Men's 60 kg at the 2018 Mediterranean Games
- Venue: Cambrils Pavilion
- Date: 27 June
- Competitors: 10 from 10 nations

Medalists
gold medal	Francisco Garrigós	Spain
silver medal	Fraj Dhouibi	Tunisia
bronze medal	Bekir Özlü	Turkey
bronze medal	David Štarkel	Slovenia

The men's 60 kg competition in judo at the 2018 Mediterranean Games was held on 27 June at the Cambrils Pavilion in Cambrils.

== Schedule ==
All times are Central European Summer Time (UTC+2).

Date	Time	Round
June 27, 2018	10:00	Round of 16
June 27, 2018	11:04	Quarterfinals
June 27, 2018	12:24	Semifinals
June 27, 2018	14:24	Repechage
June 27, 2018	17:16	Bronze medal
June 27, 2018	17:24	Final

== Results ==
=== Main Round ===
Round of 16
Jolan Florimont (FRA)	10
Diego Rea (ITA)	00
David Štarkel (SLO)	10
Suleiman Al Refayi (SYR)	00

Quarterfinals
Francisco Garrigós (ESP)	10
Jolan Florimont (FRA)	00
Issam Bassou (MAR)	10
Salim Rabahi (ALG)	00
Bekir Özlü (TUR)	10
David Štarkel (SLO)	00
Fraj Dhouibi (TUN)	10
Yann Siccardi (MON)	00

Semifinals
Francisco Garrigós (ESP)	10
Issam Bassou (MAR)	00
Bekir Özlü (TUR)	01
Fraj Dhouibi (TUN)	10

Final
Francisco Garrigós (ESP)	10
Fraj Dhouibi (TUN)	00

=== Repechage ===
Repechage		Third place
Jolan Florimont (FRA)	01
Salim Rabahi (ALG)	00	Jolan Florimont (FRA)	00
		Bekir Özlü (TUR)	10

Repechage		Third place
David Štarkel (SLO)	10
Yann Siccardi (MON)	00	David Štarkel (SLO)	10
		Issam Bassou (MAR)	00
