= World Aquatics Masters Championships =

World championship

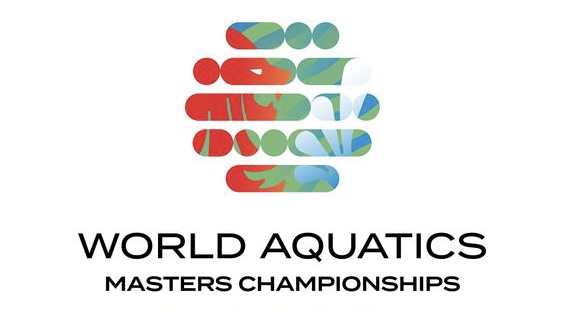
- Status: Active
- Genre: Sporting event
- Date: Mid-year
- Frequency: Biennial
- Country: Varying
- Inaugurated: 1986
- Most recent: Singapore 2025
- Previous event: Doha 2024
- Next event: Budapest 2027
- Participants: 85 Federations
- Organiser: World Aquatics
- Website: https://www.worldaquatics.com/

The World Aquatics Masters Championships (formerly the FINA World Masters Championships) are an international multi-sport aquatics championships for competitors aged 25 years and older, in accordance with World Aquatics rules and regulations. It is the highest level of masters swimming in the world. The championships are usually held biennially, with competition in all five World Aquatics disciplines: swimming, diving, water polo, open water swimming, and artistic swimming. Starting in 2015, the competition has been held jointly with the World Aquatics Championships.

== History ==
The event is organised by World Aquatics, the global governing body for aquatic sports. Originally called the FINA World Masters Championships, now the World Aquatics Masters Championships since Fukuoka 2023 after FINA rebranded to World Aquatics. Competition is for athletes aged 25 and older, with a minimum age of 30 in water polo.

The first edition of the championships under this formal masters program was held in 1986 in Tokyo, Japan. The championships draw a global field of international athletes, the 2025 edition in Singapore — the first time the event was held in Southeast Asia — hosted around 6,000 athletes from approximately 100 countries.

Over the decades, the championships have grown into the premier global competition for masters aquatics. Participation has increased substantially as masters sport and the aquatics sports in general have expanded worldwide, with athletes representing clubs and national federations across every continent. The event has also evolved to accommodate the continued growth of masters competition, with programmes expanding across all five aquatic disciplines and age categories extending into the oldest age groups. Competitors at the championships range from former Olympic and world-class athletes to lifelong competitive participants, reflecting the championships' emphasis on lifelong participation, international friendship, and competitive excellence.

A significant milestone in the event's development came at Kazan 2015, when the World Aquatics Masters Championships began being staged alongside the World Aquatics Championships. This integration enabled masters athletes to compete in many of the same world-class venues as they are set up for elite competition and strengthened the profile of masters aquatics within the international sporting calendar. In 2023, following the governing body's rebranding from FINA to World Aquatics, the championships adopted their current title, the World Aquatics Masters Championships, while maintaining the competition's traditions and continuing to attract thousands of competitors from around the world to compete at the pinnacle of international masters swimming. The Budapest 2027 World Aquatics Championships will mark an even closer alignment, running elite and masters programs concurrently in June and July, 2027.

== Disciplines ==
The Championships typically include competition in:

Swimming – held in 50 m long course pools with age groups divided in five-year increments.

Open Water Swimming – usually contested over distances such as 3 km.

Diving – including springboard, platform, and synchronised events.

Artistic Swimming – solo, duet, mixed duet, and team routines.

Water Polo – with age-group tournaments for both men's and women's teams.

Age groups begin at 25–29 (or 30–34 in water polo) and progress in five-year increments (25–29, 30–34, 35–39, etc.) without an upper limit and discipline is separated into gender and age categories. This structure ensures fair competition within comparable age brackets. Relay teams use combined age totals, allowing teams to form squads across multiple age groups. Competitors represent both their registered club/team and compete under the flag of their national federation.

== Editions ==
Number	Year	Location	Dates	Results
Non-FINA World Masters Championships
-	1978	Toronto, Canada	30–31 August	
-	1984	Christchurch, New Zealand	24–28 April	
FINA World Masters Championships
1	1986	Tokyo, Japan	12–16 July	
2	1988	Brisbane, Australia	10–15 October	
3	1990	Rio de Janeiro, Brazil	6–13 August	
4	1992	(United States) Indianapolis, USA	25 June–5 July	
5	1994	Montreal, Canada	4–10 July	
6	1996	(United Kingdom) Sheffield, Great Britain	23 June–3 July	
7	1998	Casablanca, Morocco	19–30 June	
8	2000	Munich, Germany	29 July–4 August	
9	2002	Christchurch, New Zealand	21 March–3 April	
10	2004	Riccione, Italy	1–13 June	
11	2006	(United States) Stanford, USA	4–17 August	
12	2008	Perth, Australia	18–25 April	
13	2010	Gothenburg-Borås, Sweden	27 July–7 August	
14	2012	Riccione, Italy	3–17 June	
15	2014	Montreal, Canada	27 July–10 August	
Jointly with the World Aquatics Championships
16	2015	Kazan, Russia	5–16 August	
17	2017	Budapest, Hungary	7–20 August	
18	2019	Gwangju, South Korea	5–18 August	
19	2023	Fukuoka, Japan	2–11 August	
20	2024	Doha, Qatar	23 February–3 March	
21	2025	Singapore	26 July–22 August	
22	2027	Budapest, Hungary		
23	2029	Beijing, China		

== Host cities ==
Host cities of the World Aquatics Masters Championships

== Swimming Results ==
Results are archived on the Masters section on the World Aquatics website.

=== 2025 ===
* Host nation (Singapore)

Swimming at the Singapore 2025 World Aquatics Masters Championships
Rank	Country	Gold	Silver	Bronze	Total
1	Australia (AUS)	58	50	52	160
2	Germany (GER)	54	48	45	147
3	United States (USA)	50	31	29	110
4	Great Britain (GBR)	40	34	26	100
5	Italy (ITA)	35	33	31	99
6	Japan (JPN)	28	23	32	83
7	Russia (RUS)	25	36	33	94
8	Canada (CAN)	25	13	15	53
9	Spain (ESP)	20	14	17	51
10	Brazil (BRA)	14	9	17	40
11	China (CHN)	12	11	11	34
12	Hungary (HUN)	10	9	5	24
13	South Africa (RSA)	10	7	3	20
14	Hong Kong (HKG)	10	2	5	17
15	Paraguay (PAR)	9	6	7	22
16	Switzerland (SUI)	8	8	6	22
17	Mexico (MEX)	8	5	8	21
18	Chinese Taipei (TPE)	6	2	0	8
19	Thailand (THA)	5	4	6	15
20	Greece (GRE)	5	3	5	13
21	Denmark (DEN)	4	7	0	11
22	Finland (FIN)	4	6	4	14
23	United Arab Emirates (UAE)	4	2	2	8
24	Slovenia (SLO)	4	1	2	7
25	Poland (POL)	3	9	7	19
26	Romania (ROU)	3	3	1	7
27	Luxembourg (LUX)	3	1	4	8
28	New Zealand (NZL)	3	1	3	7
29	Slovakia (SVK)	3	0	0	3
30	Argentina (ARG)	2	8	3	13
31	Ireland (IRL)	2	4	2	8
32	Belgium (BEL)	2	2	2	6
33	Sweden (SWE)	2	2	1	5
34	Bulgaria (BUL)	2	1	2	5
35	France (FRA)	1	4	7	12
36	Portugal (POR)	1	1	2	4
37	Israel (ISR)	1	1	0	2
38	Peru (PER)	1	0	6	7
39	Belarus (BLR)	1	0	3	4
40	Macau (MAC)	1	0	0	1
41	Czech Republic (CZE)	0	5	1	6
42	Egypt (EGY)	0	3	1	4
42	Ukraine (UKR)	0	3	1	4
44	Norway (NOR)	0	1	2	3
45	India (IND)	0	1	1	2
45	Panama (PAN)	0	1	1	2
47	Netherlands (NED)	0	0	2	2
48	Austria (AUT)	0	0	1	1
48	South Korea (KOR)	0	0	1	1
Totals (49 entries)		479	415	415	1,309

=== 2024 ===
* Host nation (Qatar)

Swimming at the Doha 2024 World Aquatics Masters Championships
Rank	Nation	Gold	Silver	Bronze	Total
1	Italy	53	44	37	134
2	Germany	44	39	34	117
3	Brazil	34	28	19	81
4	United States	33	29	11	73
5	Great Britain	32	30	25	87
6	Russia	28	26	20	74
7	Australia	26	27	22	75
8	South Africa	18	7	16	41
9	Hungary	16	16	23	55
10	Paraguay	15	6	3	24
11	Japan	12	16	17	45
12	Netherlands	9	7	7	23
13	Egypt	8	8	7	23
14	Spain	8	6	14	28
15	Canada	8	2	5	15
16	Switzerland	7	7	6	20
17	France	7	7	4	18
18	Denmark	6	4	2	12
19	Israel	6	4	1	11
20	Luxembourg	6	1	0	7
21	Romania	5	5	1	11
22	United Arab Emirates	5	3	1	9
23	Greece	5	0	0	5
24	Serbia	4	5	6	15
25	New Zealand	4	5	4	13
26	Austria	4	3	7	14
27	Slovenia	4	2	3	9
28	Mexico	4	1	1	6
29	Czech Republic	4	0	1	5
30	Chile	4	0	0	4
31	Ireland	3	3	5	11
32	Estonia	3	3	2	8
33	Finland	3	2	1	6
34	China	2	3	3	8
35	Belgium	2	3	1	6
36	Singapore	1	3	2	6
37	Lithuania	0	2	2	4
38	Norway	0	1	2	3
39	Chinese Taipei	0	1	1	2
40	Thailand	0	0	3	3
41	Poland	0	0	2	2
Totals (41 entries)		433	359	321	1,113

=== 2023 ===
* Host nation (Japan)

Swimming at the Fukuoka 2023 World Aquatics Masters Championships
Rank	Nation	Gold	Silver	Bronze	Total
1	Japan*	143	165	168	476
2	Great Britain	33	23	18	74
3	Germany	31	28	21	80
4	Italy	28	25	20	73
5	Australia	27	22	21	70
6	United States	26	22	27	75
7	Canada	14	11	13	38
8	Paraguay	14	4	4	22
9	Spain	10	18	16	44
10	Israel	10	7	2	19
11	France	6	11	7	24
12	Czech Republic	6	5	5	16
13	South Africa	6	3	2	11
14	Brazil	5	5	11	21
15	Switzerland	5	1	1	7
16	Mexico	5	0	8	13
17	New Zealand	4	5	2	11
18	Chile	4	4	2	10
19	Greece	4	1	0	5
20	Denmark	3	4	1	8
21	Egypt	3	3	1	7
22	Sweden	3	2	4	9
23	Luxembourg	3	2	0	5
24	Hungary	2	5	9	16
25	Argentina	2	4	2	8
26	Serbia	2	2	0	4
27	Latvia	2	1	0	3
28	Slovenia	2	0	2	4
29	Slovakia	2	0	1	3
30	Peru	1	7	4	12
31	Belgium	1	5	4	10
32	Romania	1	4	2	7
33	Lithuania	1	2	2	5
34	Austria	1	2	0	3
35	Norway	1	0	1	2
35	Poland	1	0	1	2
37	Estonia	1	0	0	1
38	Chinese Taipei	0	2	3	5
39	Ireland	0	2	2	4
40	China	0	2	0	2
41	Turkey	0	0	3	3
42	India	0	0	1	1
42	Singapore	0	0	1	1
42	Ukraine	0	0	1	1
Totals (44 entries)		413	409	393	1,215

=== 2019 ===
* Host nation (South Korea)

Swimming at the Gwangju 2019 World Aquatics Masters Championships
Rank	Nation	Gold	Silver	Bronze	Total
1	Great Britain	45	42	39	126
2	United States	40	24	35	99
3	Japan	33	30	26	89
4	Brazil	23	17	25	65
5	Thailand	21	6	4	31
6	Australia	18	9	3	30
7	South Africa	14	8	5	27
8	Russia	12	9	10	31
9	Hungary	11	7	11	29
10	Germany	6	4	0	10
11	Denmark	6	3	1	10
12	Israel	6	0	1	7
13	Romania	5	4	2	11
14	Italy	4	14	0	18
15	Netherlands	4	8	3	15
16	China	4	5	4	13
17	Canada	2	2	7	11
18	South Korea*	1	7	12	20
19	France	1	3	3	7
20	Sweden	1	2	2	5
21	Ukraine	1	1	5	7
22	Spain	0	4	1	5
23	Mexico	0	2	4	6
24	Greece	0	1	0	1
24	Norway	0	1	0	1
24	Singapore	0	1	0	1
24	Switzerland	0	1	0	1
28	Croatia	0	0	1	1
28	Egypt	0	0	1	1
28	New Zealand	0	0	1	1
Totals (30 entries)		258	215	206	679

== Notable competitors ==
A number of prominent international athletes, Olympians and Olympic gold medalists, world champions, and other notable figures from aquatic sport have competed at the championships. The following list includes competitors and figures that have competed at the World Aquatics Masters Championships.

- (United Kingdom) Jane Asher — British Masters swimmer who has won more than 20 gold medals at the World Aquatics Masters Championships and set more than 100 Masters world records. She was inducted into the International Swimming Hall of Fame in 2006 and was awarded the British Empire Medal in 2018.
- (United States) Ryan Bailey — American water polo player who competed at four consecutive Summer Olympics from 2000 to 2012. He won a silver medal at the 2008 Summer Olympics and later competed in Masters water polo.
- Joelle Bekhazi — Canadian water polo player who represented Canada at the 2020 Summer Olympics in Tokyo and made nearly 600 international appearances during her career. Bekhazi later competed in Masters water polo, including at the 2023 World Aquatics Masters Championships in Kumamoto.
- (Ukraine) Svitlana Bondarenko — Ukrainian breaststroke swimmer who competed at three Olympic Games between 1996 and 2004. She won European Championship medals during her international career and later competed in Masters swimming.
- (United States) Richard Burns — American Masters swimmer and one of the most accomplished athletes in the history of Masters swimming. Burns competed across numerous age groups, set numerous Masters world records and was inducted as an International Swimming Hall of Fame Masters Swimmer in 2026.
- (Socialist Federal Republic of Yugoslavia) Anton Cerer — Yugoslav swimmer who competed at the 1936 and 1948 Summer Olympics and won two European Championship medals. After emigrating to the United States, Cerer became a highly successful Masters swimmer, dominating his age group at World Masters Championships into his eighties. He died at the age of 90 while training for the FINA World Masters Championships.
- Mark Chay — Singaporean former Olympic swimmer who represented Singapore at the 2000 and 2004 Summer Olympics. Chay later became a leading sports administrator, including serving as president of Singapore Aquatics, and has remained closely involved with international swimming and aquatics.
- Alex Fong — Hong Kong swimmer who represented Hong Kong at the 2000 Summer Olympics in Sydney. Fong later became a singer and actor while continuing to participate in swimming and marathon swimming, including long-distance open-water events.
- (Japan) Noriko Inada — Japanese swimmer who competed at three Olympic Games, in 1992, 2000 and 2004. Inada later became a prominent Masters swimmer and set three world records in the 35–39 age group at the 2014 World Aquatics Masters Championships.
- (United States) Craig Klass — American water polo player who won a silver medal at the 1988 Summer Olympics. After his elite career, Klass competed in Masters water polo with the Olympic Club and was inducted into the USA Water Polo Hall of Fame in 2000.
- (The Bahamas) Percy Knowles — Bahamian sailor who represented the Bahamas at four Summer Olympics between 1960 and 1972. Although his Olympic career was in sailing, Knowles later competed in Masters swimming and took part in the 2010 World Aquatics Masters Championships in Sweden.
- (United Kingdom) Jennifer Knobbs — British-Canadian artistic swimmer who represented Great Britain at the 2012 Summer Olympics in London. She subsequently competed in Masters artistic swimming, including at the World Masters Championships.
- (Japan) Mikako Kotani — Japanese former artistic swimmer who competed at the 1988 Summer Olympics and 1992 Summer Olympics, winning a bronze medal in the solo event and another bronze in the duet at the 1992 Games. Kotani later returned to artistic swimming as a Masters competitor and won gold in the mixed duet at the 2024 World Aquatics Masters Championships in Doha.
- Sarra Lajnef — Tunisian swimmer who represented Tunisia at the 2012 Summer Olympics in London and subsequently competed in Masters swimming at international level.
- (Ukraine) Oleh Lisohor — Ukrainian breaststroke swimmer and former world champion who competed at three Olympic Games. Lisohor won the 50-metre breaststroke at the 2001 World Aquatics Championships and 2007 World Aquatics Championships and later competed in Masters swimming.
- Jim Montgomery — American Olympic champion and former world-record holder. Montgomery won three gold medals and one bronze medal at the 1976 Summer Olympics and became the first man to break the 50-second barrier in the 100-metre freestyle. He subsequently became deeply involved in Masters swimming and founded and coached Masters programmes in the United States.
- Giorgi Mshvenieradze — Soviet water polo player who won Olympic gold at the 1980 Summer Olympics and bronze at the 1988 Summer Olympics. Mshvenieradze later competed in Masters water polo at international Masters championships.
- (South Africa) Ryk Neethling — South African Olympic champion who competed at four consecutive Olympic Games from 1996 to 2008. He won gold in the men's 4 × 100-metre freestyle relay at the 2004 Summer Olympics and later appeared in Masters competition.
- (Malaysia) Cindy Ong Pik Yin — Malaysian swimmer and five-time FINA World Masters champion. Ong began competing in Masters competition in 2017 and won five gold and two silver medals at the 2019 World Aquatics Masters Championships in Gwangju.
- Yoshihiko Osaki — Japanese Olympic swimmer who won a silver and a bronze medal at the 1960 Summer Olympics. Osaki became an important figure in the development of Masters swimming in Japan and was involved in the organisation of the first FINA World Masters Championships in Tokyo in 1986. He later competed successfully in Masters swimming and won multiple World Masters titles.
- (United States) Karlyn Pipes — American swimmer and one of the most decorated athletes in Masters swimming. Pipes has set hundreds of Masters world records and was inducted into the International Swimming Hall of Fame in 2015 and the International Masters Swimming Hall of Fame in 2007.
- Claudia Poll — Costa Rican Olympic champion who won the 200-metre freestyle at the 1996 Summer Olympics, becoming Costa Rica's first Olympic gold medallist. She also won two bronze medals at the 2000 Summer Olympics and later competed in Masters swimming.
- (United Kingdom) Michael Read — English long-distance swimmer who was selected to represent Great Britain at the 1960 Summer Olympics. Read became one of the most successful English Channel swimmers, completing 33 crossings, and later competed in Masters open-water swimming. At the 2024 World Aquatics Masters Championships, he competed in the open-water programme at the age of 82.
- (Japan) Toshio Tajima — Japanese Masters swimmer who competed at the inaugural 1986 World Aquatics Masters Championships in Tokyo and subsequently competed at five further editions of the championships. Tajima won two gold, two silver and three bronze medals at the World Masters Championships and set 21 Masters world records. He was inducted into the International Swimming Hall of Fame Masters Hall of Fame in 2026.
- (Russia) Mikhail Vekovishchev — Russian swimmer and Olympic medallist who won silver in the men's 4 × 200-metre freestyle relay at the 2020 Summer Olympics. He has also won medals at World and European Championships and has competed in Masters swimming.

== See also ==
- Masters Swimming
- World Aquatics Championships
- World Masters Games
- European Aquatics Masters Championships
- European Masters Games
