= Chess at the 2011 Arab Games =

Chess at the 2011 Pan Arab Games
- Venue: Aspire Zone
- Location: Doha, Qatar
- Dates: 10–22 December

At the 2011 Pan Arab Games, the chess events were held at Aspire Zone in Doha, Qatar, from 10 to 22 December. A total of 6 events were contested.

== Medal summary ==
=== Men ===
Event	Gold	Silver	Bronze
Rapid Individual	Mohamed Haddouche (ALG)	Bassem Amin (EGY)	Saleh Salem (UAE)
Blitz Individual	Mohamad Al-Modiahki (QAT)	Ahmed Adly (EGY)	Mohammed Al-Sayed (QAT)
Classical Team	Egypt (EGY); Ahmed Adly; Bassem Amin; Ibrahim Labib; Kareim Wageih; Mohamed Ezat	Qatar (QAT); Ghanem Al-Sulaiti; Hamad Al-Tamimi; Husein Nezad; Mohamad Al-Modiahki; Mohammed Al-Sayed	Morocco (MAR); Abdelaziz Onkoud; Ismael Karim; Mohamed Tissir; Rachid Hifad; Sebbar Ali

=== Women ===
Event	Gold	Silver	Bronze
Rapid Individual	Zhu Chen (QAT)	Khaled Mona (EGY)	Natalie Fuad (JOR)
Blitz Individual	Zhu Chen (QAT)	Iman Al-Rufaye (IRQ)	Laila Elamri (MAR)
Classical Team	Algeria (ALG); Amina Mezioud; Amira Hamza; Khadidja Latreche; Sabrina Latreche; Zineb Dina Abdi	Jordan (JOR); Alshaeby Boshra; Ghayda Alattar; Lougain Dahdal; Natalie Fuad; Razan Al Shaeby	Egypt (EGY); Alaa El Din Yosra; Ayah Moaataz; Eman Elansary; Khaled Mona; Shrook Wafa

== Medal table ==
* Host nation (Qatar)

Rank	Nation	Gold	Silver	Bronze	Total
1	Qatar*	3	1	1	5
2	Algeria	2	0	0	2
3	Egypt	1	3	1	5
4	Jordan	0	1	1	2
5	Iraq	0	1	0	1
6	Morocco	0	0	2	2
7	United Arab Emirates	0	0	1	1
Totals (7 entries)		6	6	6	18
