= Ayah Moaataz =

Egyptian chess player (born 1997)

Personal information
- Born: 15 March 1997 (age 29)

Chess career
- Country: Egypt
- Title: Woman Grandmaster (2022)
- FIDE rating: 2059 (September 2022)
- Peak rating: 2133 (April 2022)

Ayah Moaataz (born 15 March 1997) is an Egyptian chess player and Woman Grandmaster.

She came shared second (fourth on tiebreak) with 6.5/9 in the Under 16/18 African Youth Championships in South Africa in 2012.

Moaataz played first board for the Egyptian women's team at the 2011 Pan Arab Games, where her team won the bronze medal and also played board three at the 41st Chess Olympiad in Tromso, scoring 6.5/11.

She came second at the African Women's Chess Championship in 2013 scoring 7/9 and qualified for the Women's World Chess Championship 2014 by winning the Egyptian Women's Championship in Cairo in early 2014.

Moaataz is coached by the Algerian FIDE Trainer and Fide Master Saim Mohamed Ilias
