= Swimming at the 2011 Arab Games =

Swimming at the 2011 Pan Arab Games
- Venue: Hamad Aquatic Center
- Location: Doha, Qatar

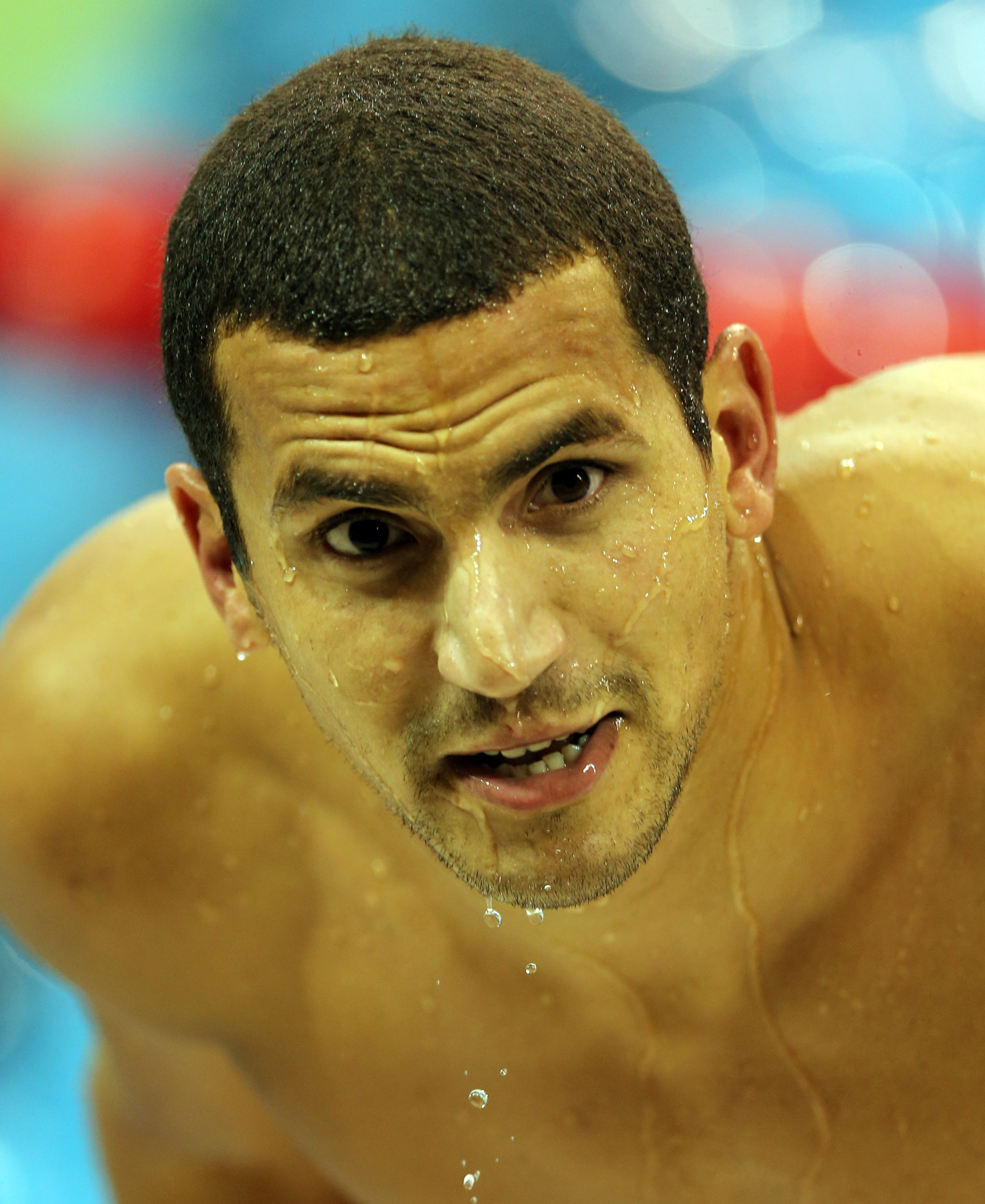
Tunisian swimmer Oussama Mellouli won 16 Medal.

Swimming at the 2011 Arab Games was held at Hamad Aquatic Center in Doha, Qatar from 17 to 22 December. A total of 38 long course (50m) events were contested. The top medal-winning athletes from the Games both came from Swimming: Tunisia's Oussama Mellouli (15 golds, 1 silver) and Egypt's Farida Osman (7 golds).

== Participating nations ==
17 nations entered 115 swimmers (77 males, 38 females) at the 2011 Arab Games:

- Algeria (13)
- Comoros (3)
- Djibouti (3)
- Egypt (16)
- Iraq (5)
- Jordan (9)
- Kuwait (10)
- Lebanon (3)
- Libya (6)
- Morocco (11)
- Oman (1)
- Palestine (5)
- Qatar (8)
- Saudi Arabia (5)
- Sudan (4)
- Tunisia (10)
- United Arab Emirates (3)

== Results ==
=== Men ===
Event	Gold		Silver		Bronze	
50m Freestyle	Oussama Mellouli (TUN)	23.03 NR	Nabil Kebbab (ALG)	23.12	Shehab Younis (EGY)	23.19
100m Freestyle	Oussama Mellouli (TUN)	49.55 NR	Oussama Sahnoune (ALG)	50.41	Nabil Kebbab (ALG)	50.48
200m Freestyle	Oussama Mellouli (TUN)	1:48.85	Marawan Aly (EGY)	1:51.71	Ahmed Mathlouthi (TUN)	1:51.91
400m Freestyle	Oussama Mellouli (TUN)	3:54.16	Mohamed Farhoud (EGY)	3:56.35	Ahmed Mathlouthi (TUN)	3:57.93
1500m Freestyle	Oussama Mellouli (TUN)	15:33.05	Mohamed Farhoud (EGY)	15:55.16	Ahmed Mathlouthi (TUN)	16:21.68
50m Backstroke	Abdullah Althuwaini (KUW)	26.41	Mohamed Hussein (EGY)	26.63	Amine Kouame (MAR)	27.04
100m Backstroke	Oussama Mellouli (TUN)	55.92 NR	Abdullah Althuwaini (KUW)	56.40	Mohamed Hussein (EGY)	56.85
200m Backstroke	Oussama Mellouli (TUN)	2:02.67 NR	Taki Mrabet (TUN)	2:03.61	Mohamed Hussein (EGY)	2:05.44
50m Breaststroke	Wassim Elloumi (TUN)	28.77	Talel M'Rabet (TUN)	29.13	Nabil Kebbab (ALG); Ahmed Bayoumy (EGY)	29.17
100m Breaststroke	Wassim Elloumi (TUN)	1:02.47 NR	Nabil Kebbab (ALG)	1:02.60	Ahmed Bayoumy (EGY)	1:04.43
200m Breaststroke	Oussama Mellouli (TUN)	2:16.53	Taki Mrabet (TUN)	2:18.06	Mohamed Gadallh (EGY)	2:19.67
50m Butterfly	Oussama Mellouli (TUN)	24.90 NR	Bilal Achelhi (MAR)	25.34	Marwan Hellal (EGY); Taki Mrabet (TUN)	25.36
100m Butterfly	Oussama Mellouli (TUN)	53.73 NR	Yousef Alaskari (KUW)	54.00	Taki Mrabet (TUN)	54.54
200m Butterfly	Oussama Mellouli (TUN)	1:59.98	Yousef Alaskari (KUW)	2:00.75	Marwan Hellal (EGY)	2:03.22
200m Individual Medley	Oussama Mellouli (TUN)	1:59.99	Taki Mrabet (TUN)	2:02.22	Morad Berrada (MAR)	2:05.35
400m Individual Medley	Oussama Mellouli (TUN)	4:15.94	Taki Mrabet (TUN)	4:18.15	Morad Berrada (MAR)	4:28.27
4 × 100 m Freestyle Relay	Tunisia (TUN); Taki Mrabet; Talel M'Rabet; Ahmed Mathlouthi; Oussama Mellouli	3:23.87 NR	Algeria (ALG); Nabil Kebbab; Jugurtha Boumali; Badis Djendouci; Oussama Sahnoune; Ryad Djendouci*	3:24.09	Kuwait (KUW); Abdullah Althuwaini; Yousef Alaskari; Mohammad Madouh; Salman Qali; Sooud Altattar*; Abbas Qali*	3:25.18
4 × 200 m Freestyle Relay	Tunisia (TUN); Talel M'Rabet; Ahmed Mathlouthi; Taki Mrabet; Oussama Mellouli	7:28.26 NR	Kuwait (KUW); Yousef Alaskari; Mohammad Madouh; Abdullah Althuwaini; Sooud Altayyar	7:34.68	Egypt (EGY); Marawan Aly; Mohamed Gadallh; Adham Abdelmegid; Mohamed Farhoud	7:36.44
4 × 100 m Medley Relay	Egypt (EGY); Mohamed Hussein; Ahmed Bayoumy; Marwan Hellal; Adham Abdelmegid	3:46.37	Tunisia (TUN); Taki Mrabet; Wassim Elloumi; Oussama Mellouli; Ahmed Mathlouthi	3:46.67 NR	Kuwait (KUW); Abdullah Althuwaini; Ahmad Albader; Yousef Alaskari; Mohammad Madouh; Shuaib Althuwaini*; Abbas Qali*	3:51.94

=== Women ===
Event	Gold		Silver		Bronze	
50m Freestyle	Farida Osman (EGY)	25.96	Mai Mostafa (EGY)	26.84	Katya Bachrouche (LIB)	26.91
100m Freestyle	Farida Osman (EGY)	56.50	Zeineb Khalfallah (TUN)	58.04	Rowan Elbadry (EGY)	58.38
200m Freestyle	Katya Bachrouche (LIB)	2:01.83	Sara El Bekri (MAR)	2:03.10 NR	Zeineb Khalfallah (TUN)	2:05.04
400m Freestyle	Katya Bachrouche (LIB)	4:15.24	Sara El Bekri (MAR)	4:17.55 NR	Sarra Lajnef (TUN)	4:23.03
800m Freestyle	Katya Bachrouche (LIB)	8:44.50	Sara El Bekri (MAR)	8:49.67 NR	Reem Kassem (EGY)	9:02.71
50m Backstroke	Farida Osman (EGY)	30.25	Amel Melih (ALG)	30.61	Fella Bennaceur (ALG)	31.17
100m Backstroke	Amel Melih (ALG)	1:06.20	Hania Moro (EGY)	1:06.22	Fella Bennaceur (ALG)	1:06.41
200m Backstroke	Hania Moro (EGY)	2:19.33	Sarra Lajnef (TUN)	2:21.90 NR	Sara Hayajna (JOR)	2:24.34
50m Breaststroke	Sara El Bekri (MAR)	32.12	Mai Mostafa (EGY)	33.38	Sarra Lajnef (TUN)	34.26
100m Breaststroke	Sara El Bekri (MAR)	1:08.42	Sarra Lejnef (TUN)	1:11.14	Mai Mostafa (EGY)	1:11.82
200m Breaststroke	Sara El Bekri (MAR)	2:27.17	Sarra Lajnef (TUN)	2:33.26	Rowida Ibrahim (EGY)	2:34.54
50m Butterfly	Farida Osman (EGY)	26.58	Fella Bennaceur (ALG)	28.49	Talita Baqlah (JOR)	28.71
100m Butterfly	Farida Osman (EGY)	1:00.50	Fella Bennaceur (ALG)	1:02.45	Katya Bachrouche (LIB)	1:02.77
200m Butterfly	Sara El Bekri (MAR)	2:16.21 NR	Nesrine Khelifatie (ALG)	2:17.62	Sarah Hadj Abderrahmane (ALG)	2:20.25
200m Individual Medley	Katya Bachrouche (LIB)	2:17.10	Sara El Bekri (MAR)	2:17.24 NR	Sarra Lejnef (TUN)	2:18.91
400m Individual Medley	Sara El Bekri (MAR)	4:48.04 NR	Sarra Lajnef (TUN)	4:52.90	Rowida Ibrahim (EGY)	4:59.47
4 × 100 m Freestyle Relay	Egypt (EGY); Rowan Elbadry; Shahd Mostafa; Mai Mostafa; Farida Osman	3:53.02	Tunisia (TUN); Zeineb Khalfallah; Myriam Meddeb; Farah Ben Khelil; Sarra Lajnef	3:55.76 NR	Algeria (ALG); Fella Bennaceur; Amel Melih; Malia Meghazi Bakhouch; Souad Cherouatie	3:59.88
4 × 200 m Freestyle Relay	Egypt (EGY); Rowan Elbadry; Hania Moro; Reem Kassem; Shahd Mostafa	8:32.40	Algeria (ALG); Fella Bennaceur; Malia Meghazi Bakhouch; Souad Cherouatie; Nesrine Khelifatie	8:35.34	Tunisia (TUN); Farah Ben Khelil; Sarra Lajnef; Asma Ben Boukhatem; Zeineb Khalfallah	8:38.13
4 × 100 m Medley Relay	Egypt (EGY); Hania Moro; Mai Mostafa; Farida Osman; Rowan Elbadry	4:19.47	Morocco (MAR); Imane Boulaamane; Sara El Bekri; Noufissa Chbihi; Marwa El Banar	4:22.21 NR	Tunisia (TUN); Farah Ben Khelil; Sarra Lajnef; Myriam Meddeb; Zeineb Khalfallah	4:23.75 NR

=== Medal standings ===
Rank	Nation	Gold	Silver	Bronze	Total
1	Tunisia	17	12	11	40
2	Egypt	10	7	14	31
3	Morocco	5	6	3	14
4	Lebanon	4	0	2	6
5	Algeria	1	9	6	16
6	Kuwait	1	4	2	7
7	Jordan	0	0	2	2
Totals (7 entries)		38	38	40	116
