= Beach volleyball at the 2011 Arab Games =

This article shows the women's tournament at the 2011 Pan Arab Games. Only men participated in this first edition of beach volleyball at the Pan Arab Games.

== Preliminary round ==
=== Pool A ===
Pos	Team	Pld	W	L	Pts	SPW	SPL	SPR	SW	SL	SR
1	(Lebanon) Abi Chedid / Fares	5	4	1	9	232	167	1.389	9	3	3.000
2	(Oman) Al Housni / Al Shereiqi	5	4	1	9	199	181	1.099	8	3	2.667
3	(Palestine) Al Arqan / Tafesh	5	3	2	8	204	183	1.115	7	4	1.750
4	(Algeria) Boutefnouchet / Smahi	5	2	3	7	178	202	0.881	4	7	0.571
5	(Egypt) Abdelnaeim / Shahin	5	1	4	6	185	195	0.949	3	8	0.375
6	(Sudan) Faris / Ahmed	5	1	4	6	116	186	0.624	2	8	0.250

Date		Score		Set 1	Set 2	Set 3
10 Dec	(Egypt) Abdelnaeim / Shahin	0–2	(Oman) Al Housni / Al Shereiqi	11–21	19–21	
10 Dec	(Algeria) Boutefnouchet / Smahi	0–2	(Palestine) Al Arqan / Tafesh	16–21	17–21	
10 Dec	(Sudan) Faris / Ahmed	0–2	(Lebanon) Abi Chedid / Fares	7–21	9–21	
11 Dec	(Algeria) Boutefnouchet / Smahi	2–0	(Sudan) Faris / Ahmed	21–11	21–11	
11 Dec	(Oman) Al Housni / Al Shereiqi	2–1	(Lebanon) Abi Chedid / Fares	21–17	19–21	15–13
11 Dec	(Palestine) Al Arqan / Tafesh	2–0	(Egypt) Abdelnaeim / Shahin	21–18	21–15	
12 Dec	(Sudan) Faris / Ahmed	0–2	(Palestine) Al Arqan / Tafesh	9–21	11–21	
12 Dec	(Egypt) Abdelnaeim / Shahin	0–2	(Lebanon) Abi Chedid / Fares	16–21	10–21	
12 Dec	(Oman) Al Housni / Al Shereiqi	2–0	(Algeria) Boutefnouchet / Smahi	21–14	21–17	
13 Dec	(Egypt) Abdelnaeim / Shahin	2–0	(Sudan) Faris / Ahmed	21–9	21–7	
13 Dec	(Lebanon) Abi Chedid / Fares	2–0	(Algeria) Boutefnouchet / Smahi	21–10	21–9	
13 Dec	(Palestine) Al Arqan / Tafesh	0–2	(Oman) Al Housni / Al Shereiqi	12–21	15–21	
14 Dec	(Lebanon) Abi Chedid / Fares	2–1	(Palestine) Al Arqan / Tafesh	21–19	19–21	15–11
14 Dec	(Oman) Al Housni / Al Shereiqi	0–2	(Sudan) Faris / Ahmed	18–21	0–21	inj
14 Dec	(Algeria) Boutefnouchet / Smahi	2–1	(Egypt) Abdelnaeim / Shahin	15–21	21–18	17–15

=== Pool B ===
Pos	Team	Pld	W	L	Pts	SPW	SPL	SPR	SW	SL	SR
1	(Bahrain) Marhoon / Qarqoor	4	4	0	8	171	111	1.541	8	0	MAX
2	(Qatar) Ahmed / Malik	4	3	1	7	163	111	1.468	6	2	3.000
3	(Libya) Al Marug / Al Tumi	4	2	2	6	128	149	0.859	4	4	1.000
4	(Kuwait) Dashti / Al Asaaf	4	1	3	5	117	178	0.657	2	7	0.286
5	(Iraq) Sabbar / Al Aug	4	0	4	4	155	185	0.838	1	8	0.125
6	(Djibouti) Elmi / Saleh	0	0	0	0	0	0	—	0	0	—

Date		Score		Set 1	Set 2	Set 3
10 Dec	(Kuwait) Dashti / Al Asaaf	0–2	(Libya) Al Marug / Al Tumi	13–21	9–21	
10 Dec	(Bahrain) Marhoon / Qarqoor	2–0	(Djibouti) Elmi / Saleh	21–8	21–2	
10 Dec	(Qatar) Ahmed / Malik	2–0	(Iraq) Sabbar / Al Aug	21–16	21–19	
11 Dec	(Libya) Al Marug / Al Tumi	2–0	(Djibouti) Elmi / Saleh	21–8	21–9	
11 Dec	(Iraq) Sabbar / Al Aug	1–2	(Kuwait) Dashti / Al Asaaf	18–21	22–20	12–15
11 Dec	(Qatar) Ahmed / Malik	0–2	(Bahrain) Marhoon / Qarqoor	18–21	19–21	
12 Dec	(Bahrain) Marhoon / Qarqoor	2–0	(Iraq) Sabbar / Al Aug	21–10	21–18	
12 Dec	(Djibouti) Elmi / Saleh	0–2	(Kuwait) Dashti / Al Asaaf	12–21	8–21	
12 Dec	(Qatar) Ahmed / Malik	2–0	(Libya) Al Marug / Al Tumi	21–9	21–8	
13 Dec	(Kuwait) Dashti / Al Asaaf	0–2	(Bahrain) Marhoon / Qarqoor	9–21	13–21	
13 Dec	(Iraq) Sabbar / Al Aug	0–2	(Libya) Al Marug / Al Tumi	22–24	18–21	
13 Dec	(Djibouti) Elmi / Saleh	0–2	(Qatar) Ahmed / Malik	0–21	0–21	dns
14 Dec	(Libya) Al Marug / Al Tumi	0–2	(Bahrain) Marhoon / Qarqoor	22–24	2–21	inj
14 Dec	(Kuwait) Dashti / Al Asaaf	0–2	(Qatar) Ahmed / Malik	8–21	9–21	

(Djibouti) Elmi & Saleh disqualified so their results are not counted

=== Pool C ===
Pos	Team	Pld	W	L	Pts	SPW	SPL	SPR	SW	SL	SR
1	(Oman) Al Subhi / Al Balushi	5	5	0	10	242	176	1.375	10	2	5.000
2	(Morocco) Ourhdach / Boukhare	5	4	1	9	225	190	1.184	8	4	2.000
3	(Bahrain) Husain / Ebrahim	5	3	2	8	234	174	1.345	8	4	2.000
4	(Yemen) Al-Awlaqi / Mohammed	5	2	3	7	214	202	1.059	6	6	1.000
5	(Jordan) Duqmaq / Thamer	5	1	4	6	134	209	0.641	2	8	0.250
6	(Iraq) Naser / Younus	5	0	5	5	116	214	0.542	0	10	0.000

Date		Score		Set 1	Set 2	Set 3
10 Dec	(Jordan) Duqmaq / Thamer	0–2	(Morocco) Ourhdach / Boukhare	9–21	17–21	
10 Dec	(Yemen) Al-Awlaqi / Mohammed	0–2	(Bahrain) Husain / Ebrahim	12–21	17–21	
10 Dec	(Iraq) Naser / Younus	0–2	(Oman) Al Subhi / Al Balushi	7–21	13–21	
11 Dec	(Morocco) Ourhdach / Boukhare	0–2	(Oman) Al Subhi / Al Balushi	17–21	11–21	
11 Dec	(Bahrain) Husain / Ebrahim	2–0	(Jordan) Duqmaq / Thamer	21–10	21–10	
11 Dec	(Yemen) Al-Awlaqi / Mohammed	2–0	(Iraq) Naser / Younus	21–13	21–14	
12 Dec	(Iraq) Naser / Younus	0–2	(Bahrain) Husain / Ebrahim	6–21	3–21	
12 Dec	(Oman) Al Subhi / Al Balushi	2–0	(Jordan) Duqmaq / Thamer	21–11	21–11	
12 Dec	(Yemen) Al-Awlaqi / Mohammed	1–2	(Morocco) Ourhdach / Boukhare	21–19	15–21	17–19
13 Dec	(Oman) Al Subhi / Al Balushi	2–1	(Yemen) Al-Awlaqi / Mohammed	21–17	18–21	15–10
13 Dec	(Bahrain) Husain / Ebrahim	1–2	(Morocco) Ourhdach / Boukhare	16–21	21–18	13–15
13 Dec	(Jordan) Duqmaq / Thamer	2–0	(Iraq) Naser / Younus	21–18	25–23	
14 Dec	(Morocco) Ourhdach / Boukhare	2–0	(Iraq) Naser / Younus	21–7	21–12	
14 Dec	(Jordan) Duqmaq / Thamer	0–2	(Yemen) Al-Awlaqi / Mohammed	10–21	10–21	
14 Dec	(Oman) Al Subhi / Al Balushi	2–1	(Bahrain) Husain / Ebrahim	26–28	21–18	15–12

=== Pool D ===
Pos	Team	Pld	W	L	Pts	SPW	SPL	SPR	SW	SL	SR
1	(Egypt) Abdelnaeim / Atta	4	4	0	8	189	152	1.243	8	1	8.000
2	(Yemen) Mahfoudh / Al-Zawiya	4	3	1	7	160	133	1.203	6	2	3.000
3	(Jordan) Ahmad /Abu Al Roob	4	2	2	6	162	135	1.200	4	4	1.000
4	(Qatar) Ebrahim / Abdulkhaleq	4	1	3	5	148	169	0.876	3	6	0.500
5	(Sudan) Mamour / Osman	4	0	4	4	98	168	0.583	0	8	0.000
6	(Kuwait) Abdulmajieid / Al Shayji	0	0	0	0	0	0	—	0	0	—

Date		Score		Set 1	Set 2	Set 3
10 Dec	(Egypt) Abdelnaeim / Atta	2–0	(Yemen) Mahfoudh / Al-Zawiya	21–16	21–18	
10 Dec	(Sudan) Mamour / Osman	0–2	(Qatar) Ebrahim / Abdulkhaleq	11–21	14–21	
10 Dec	(Jordan) Ahmad /Abu Al Roob	2–1	(Kuwait) Abdulmajieid / Al Shayji	17–21	21–19	15–11
11 Dec	(Qatar) Ebrahim / Abdulkhaleq	1–2	(Egypt) Abdelnaeim / Atta	26–24	13–21	7–15
11 Dec	(Yemen) Mahfoudh / Al-Zawiya	2–0	(Kuwait) Abdulmajieid / Al Shayji	21–8	21–17	
11 Dec	(Sudan) Mamour / Osman	0–2	(Jordan) Ahmad /Abu Al Roob	5–21	12–21	
12 Dec	(Sudan) Mamour / Osman	0–2	(Yemen) Mahfoudh / Al-Zawiya	13–21	12–21	
12 Dec	(Jordan) Ahmad /Abu Al Roob	2–0	(Qatar) Ebrahim / Abdulkhaleq	21–18	21–13	
12 Dec	(Kuwait) Abdulmajieid / Al Shayji	0–2	(Egypt) Abdelnaeim / Atta	0–21	0–21	dns
13 Dec	(Kuwait) Abdulmajieid / Al Shayji	0–2	(Sudan) Mamour / Osman	0–21	0–21	inj
13 Dec	(Egypt) Abdelnaeim / Atta	2–0	(Jordan) Ahmad /Abu Al Roob	22–20	23–21	
13 Dec	(Qatar) Ebrahim / Abdulkhaleq	0–2	(Yemen) Mahfoudh / Al-Zawiya	16–21	13–21	
14 Dec	(Yemen) Mahfoudh / Al-Zawiya	2–0	(Jordan) Ahmad /Abu Al Roob	21–18	21–19	
14 Dec	(Egypt) Abdelnaeim / Atta	2–0	(Sudan) Mamour / Osman	21–12	21–19	

(Kuwait) Abdulmajieid & Al Shayji disqualified so their results are not counted

=== Final round ===
Round of 16
Date		Score		Set 1	Set 2	Set 3
15 Dec	(Lebanon) Abi Chedid / Fares	2–1	(Yemen) Al-Awlaqi / Mohammed	18–21	21–12	15–6
15 Dec	(Libya) Al Marug / Al Tumi	2–0	(Yemen) Mahfoudh / Al-Zawiya	21–18	21–12	
15 Dec	(Oman) Al Subhi / Al Balushi	2–0	(Algeria) Boutefnouchet / Smahi	21–8	21–14	
15 Dec	(Qatar) Ahmed / Malik	2–0	(Jordan) Jamil / Shareef	21–13	21–17	
15 Dec	(Bahrain) Marhoon / Qarqoor	2–0	(Qatar) Ebrahim / Abdulkhaleq	21–11	21–19	
15 Dec	(Palestine) Al Arqan / Tafesh	0–2	(Morocco) Ourhdach / Boukhare	18–21	17–21	
15 Dec	(Egypt) Okasha / Atta	2–0	(Kuwait) Dashti / Al Asaaf	21–16	21–13	
15 Dec	(Oman) Al Housni / Al Shereiqi	2–0	(Bahrain) Husain / Ebrahim	23–21	21–18	

Quarterfinals; December 15
(Lebanon) Abi Chedid / Fares	21	21
(Libya) Al Marug / Al Tumi	18	12
(Oman) Al Subhi / Al Balushi	21	22
(Qatar) Ahmed / Malik	13	20
(Bahrain) Marhoon / Qarqoor	21	15	15
(Morocco) Ourhdach / Boukhare	17	21	11
(Egypt) Okasha / Atta	13	13
(Oman) Al Housni / Al Shereiqi	21	21

Semifinals; December 16
(Lebanon) Abi Chedid / Fares	19	0	inj
(Oman) Al Subhi / Al Balushi	21	21
(Bahrain) Marhoon / Qarqoor	21	12	13
(Oman) Al Housni / Al Shereiqi	19	21	15

Gold medal match December 16
(Oman) Al Subhi / Al Balushi	21	15	15
(Oman) Al Housni / Al Shereiqi	17	21	9
Bronze medal match
(Lebanon) Abi Chedid / Fares	0	0	inj
(Bahrain) Marhoon / Qarqoor	21	21
