= Mohamed Srour =

Egyptian artistic gymnast (born 1986)

- محمد سيد محمد سرور
- Full name: Mohamed Sayed Mohamed Srour
- Born: 18 January 1986 (age 40) Cairo, Egypt

Gymnastics career
- Discipline: Men's artistic gymnastics
- Country represented: Egypt; (2008–2011)
Medal record
Men's artistic gymnastics
Event	1st	2nd	3rd
African Games	2	2	0
Arab Games	1	0	1
Total	3	2	1
Representing Egypt
African Games
Gold medal – first place	2003 Abuja	Floor
Gold medal – first place	2007 Algiers	Vault
Silver medal – second place	2007 Algiers	Team
Silver medal – second place	2007 Algiers	Floor
Arab Games
Gold medal – first place	2011 Doha	Team
Bronze medal – third place	2011 Doha	Vault

Mohamed Sayed Mohamed Srour (born 18 January 1986) is an Egyptian male artistic gymnast, representing his nation at international competitions. He participated at the 2008 Summer Olympics in Beijing, China.

== Olympic results ==
Floor exercise	Horizontal Bar	Individual All-Around	Parallel Bars	Pommeled Horse	Rings
73rd place	57th place	44th place	75th place	64th place	70th place
