= Algerian Chess Championship =

The Algerian Chess Championship is currently organized by FADE, the Algerian Chess Federation (French: Fédération Algérienne des échecs), which was established in 1973. It joined FIDE in 1974 and held the first national championships in 1975.

== National championship winners ==
Year	Champion
1975	Chaabi
1976	Boulsane
1977	Abdelatif Henni
1978	Abdelatif Kharchi
1979	Abdelatif Kharchi
1980	Zitouni Cherrad
1981	Aziz Madani Benhadi
1982	Abdelhamid Slimani
1983	Abderahmane Bousmaha
1985	Abderahmane Bousmaha
1986	Kamel Sebih
1988	Mahfoud Boudiba
1989	Kamel Sebih
1990	Kamel Sebih
1991	Abd'Ennacer Bammoune
1992	Abdelnour Ahmed Zaid
1993	Kamel Sebih
1994	Ryad Rizouk
1995	Mohamed Henni
1996	Mohamed Henni
1997	Mohamed Henni
1998	Mohamed Henni
1999	Aimen Rizouk
2000	Mohamed Henni
2001	Saad Belouadah
2002	Saad Belouadah
2003	Mohamed Henni
2004	Saad Belouadah
2005	Mohamed Haddouche
2006	Badr-Eddine Khelfallah
2007	Saad Belouadah
2008	Tarek Goutali
2009	Mohamed Haddouche
2010	Saad Belouadah
2011	Mohamed Haddouche
2012	Mohamed Haddouche
2013	Mohamed Haddouche
2014	Mohamed Haddouche
2015	Mohamed Haddouche
2016	Chafik Talbi
2017	Mohamed Haddouche
2018	Bilel Bellahcene
2019	Chafik Talbi
2020	Cancelled due to COVID-19
2021	Djabri Massinas
2022	Djabri Massinas
2023	Djabri Massinas
2024	Abdellah Amrane
