= Tameem Al-Kubati =

Yemeni taekwondo practitioner

Personal information
- Nationality: Yemeni
- Born: January 1, 1987 (age 39) Sana'a, North Yemen

Sport
- Country: Yemen
- Sport: Taekwondo
- Event: Men's 68 kg
Medal record
Men's taekwondo
Representing Yemen
Asian Championships
Bronze medal – third place	2008 Luoyang	Finweight
Pan Arab Games
Gold medal – first place	2011 Doha	Finweight

Tameem Mohammed Ahmed Al-Kubati (born 1 January 1989 in Sana'a) is a Yemeni taekwondo practitioner.

Al-Kubati won a bronze medal at the 2008 Asian Taekwondo Championships and a gold medal at the 2011 Pan Arab Games.

He competed at the 2012 Summer Olympics in the 58kg event. He was the flag bearer of the Yemeni sports team during the opening ceremonies. On August 8, he advanced from the preliminaries to the quarterfinals by defeating Gabriel Mercedes of the Dominican Republic (8-3). In the quarterfinals, he was defeated by Óscar Muñoz of Colombia (2-14).
