= Cindy Ong Pik Yin =

Malaysian swimmer

Cindy Ong Pik Yin JBP, PPT
Personal information
- Born: 7 June 1984 (age 42) Ipoh, Perak, Malaysia
- Education: Drury University
- Occupation: Swimmer
Medal record
Women's Swimming
Representing Malaysia
World Masters Championships
Gold medal – first place	2019 Gwangju	100 m freestyle
Gold medal – first place	2019 Gwangju	50 m butterfly
Gold medal – first place	2019 Gwangju	100 m butterfly
Silver medal – second place	2019 Gwangju	50 m freestyle
Silver medal – second place	2019 Gwangju	50 m breastroke

Cindy Ong Pik Yin is a Malaysian competitive swimmer. She has been swimming competitively since 1989. She is a World Masters Champion.

== Early life ==
Ong was born in Ipoh, Perak, Malaysia. She is the younger sibling of Allen Ong, Malaysian former swimmer, and niece of Ong Mei Lin, who was one of Malaysia's first female swimmers to represent the country in the Olympics.

== Career ==
=== Swimming ===
Training and competing throughout pregnancy, she clinched second place at the Malaysia Masters Speedo International Championship despite being 8 months pregnant.

In 2017, Ong competed in her first World Masters Championship.

Seven months following the delivery of her third child, she competed among 9,000 participants in the 2017 FINA World Masters in Budapest, Hungary, placing 5th in the 100m Freestyle event.

She achieved the title of World No.1 in the 2020 FINA World Masters 50 meter Freestyle race.

Ong is currently ranked No. 2 in the 100 meter Butterfly, out touched by Spain's Erika Villa.

=== Coach ===
Ong is also a certified swimming coach.

- Amateur Swimming Union of Malaysia (ASUM) Level 2 Swimming Coach
- Amateur Swimming Union of Malaysia (ASUM) Certified Swimming Instructor
- National Sports Council of Malaysia (NSC) Level 2 Sports Science
- Amateur Swimming Union of Malaysia (ASUM) Technical Official Grade 3
- Life Saving Society Malaysia (LSSM) Bronze Medallion
- Life Saving Society of Malaysia Certificate of Cardio Pulmonary Resuscitation (LSSM CPR)
- International Life Saver (ILS)
- Ex-head coach, Stingray Swimming Club (2006–2011)

== Accolades ==
She was presented with the title of Perak's Sportswoman of the Year in 2005, in recognition of breaking 5 Malaysia national records, winning 6 gold medals and bagging the Best Sportswoman title at the 2004 SUKMA Games.

For all of these, and for her significant contribution to the overall Malaysian swimming sport, Ong was awarded the Pingat Pekerti Terpilih title in 2006.

In the 2004 Sukma Games, Ong won 6 gold medals, contributed 12.8% of the medal tally for Perak and was awarded the Best Sportswoman Award.

In the 2019 FINA World Masters Championship in Gwangju, South Korea, Ong won 5 gold and 2 silver medals from that championship.

Shortly after, she was recognized by The Malaysia Book of Records for the Most Gold Medals Won by an Individual Swimmer in a World Masters Championship (FEMALE) in 2019.

== Advocacy and safe sport ==
Ong has been an advocate for athlete welfare and safe sport, particularly following her public disclosures in 2021 regarding sexual harassment in competitive swimming.

In 2025, she was invited by UNESCO to participate in a global consultation on developing policy standards for inclusive, equitable, and safe sport. She was the first and only Malaysian selected to join a focus group of international athletes and experts contributing to the framework.

The consultation, conducted in collaboration with the Sport & Rights Alliance, aimed to incorporate athlete perspectives into global safeguarding policies and standards.

== Education ==
Ong was awarded the Drury Academic Honor Scholarship and obtained a Bachelor of Arts (Hons) in Psychology & Sociology from Drury University, Missouri, United States.

She later completed a PhD in Interdepartmental Studies, majoring in Sport Science (Swimming), at a university in Paris, France. Her graduation was confirmed in 2026.

== Personal life ==
Ong was married to an Asian American. She has three children: Hayden, Kiara, and Connor. The couple divorced in 2023 following proceedings that began in 2020, which included custody arrangements for their children.

=== Sexual Assault ===
In May 2021, Ong came forward on how she had encountered sexual harassment and assault over the years, including from a national coach when she was a teenager. After this was shared, then the former Youth and Sports Minister, Datuk Seri Reezal Merican Naina Merican ordered his officers and the National Sports Council (NSC) to contact and assist Ong and help lodge a police report about the acts committed on Ong. Ong decided not to pursue a case against the coach or publicly name him as she believed too much time has passed. Ong is now an advocate for anti sexual harassment and wishes to be a catalyst of change for others.

=== Searching a missing plane ===
Ong's grandfather was reported to be one of the first Malaysians to own a private airplane. However, the current status and the condition of the airplane are unknown. Ong is now actively searching for the plane's current whereabouts.

== Prominent awards and rankings ==
Year	Award	Category	Result	References
	All Time Top 10 FINA Masters World Ranking	50m Butterfly Long Course 35-39 age-group		
2020	Japan Masters National Record Holder	50m freestyle	Fastest, 26.71	
2020	Japan Masters National Record Holder	100m butterfly	Second fastest, 1:04.31	
2019	FINA World Masters		Multiple Gold Medalist	
2019	Malaysia Book of Records for Most Gold Medals Won by Individual Swimmer in World Masters Championship (FEMALE)			
2019	World Masters Rankings	50m Butterfly Long Course	2nd	
2019	World Masters Rankings	100m Butterfly Long Course	1st	
2019	World Masters Rankings	Relay 160-199 Mixed Freestyle Long Course	1st	
2019	World Masters Rankings	Relay 160-199 Mixed Medley Long Course	2nd	
2019	World Masters Rankings	50m Butterfly Short Course	3rd	
2019	World Masters Rankings	100m Butterfly Short Course	3rd	
2017	Japan Masters Ranking	50m Freestyle Short Course	1st	
2017	Japan Masters Ranking	25m Butterfly Short Course	2nd	
2017	Japan Masters Ranking	50m Breaststroke Short Course	1st	
2017	Japan Masters Ranking	50m Breaststroke Short Course	1st	
2006	Pingat Pekerti Terpilih (P.P.T) Title Recognition by the Sultan of Perak, Malaysia		Awarded	
2005	Perak SportsWoman of the year		Nominated and chosen	
2004	SUKMA (Malaysian Games)	6 gold medals, 5 national records; Awarded the Most Outstanding Female Athlete Award		
2001	JBP (Jasa Bakti PEMADAM) by Ministry of Education & United Nations (as a role model for the young generation)		Awarded title	
2000	Most Outstanding Female Athlete Award in SUPER, (Perak Sports)			

=== Masters Swimming ===
Medal Record
Year	Competition	Location	(gold) Gold	(silver) Silver	(bronze) Bronze	Record(s)
2020	Tokyoto Spring Short Course Meters	Tokyo, Japan	7	1		2
2019	Milo/PraKL Age Group Swimming Championship	Malaysia	5			5
2019	SEASF Masters Swimming Championship	Jakarta, Indonesia	10	2		10
2019	FINA World Masters Championship	Gwangju, Korea	5	2		
2019	Super Renang/PIAG (Perak Invitational Age Group) Swimming Championship Ipoh	Ipoh, Malaysia	2			
2019	Aminovital Singapore Masters Swimming Championship	Singapore	8			
2019	Japan Masters Swimming Sprint Championship	Tokyo, Japan	7	1		
2019	Speedo Malaysia International Masters Swimming Championship (MVP of the meet)	Malaysia	13			11
2019	Indonesia Open Aquatic Championship Master Swimming	Jakarta, Indonesia	7	1		
2018	MILO/PraKL Age Group Swimming Championship	Kuala Lumpur, Malaysia	3			
2018	Southeast Asia Pacific (SEAP) Singapore	Singapore	9	1		
2018	Malaysia Invitational Age Group Swimming Championship	Malaysia			1	
2018	Asian Masters Swimming Championship	Nagoya, Japan	7			7
2018	Asia Pacific Masters Games	Penang, Malaysia	6			6
2018	Singapore Masters Short Course Swimming Championship	Singapore	8		1	
2018	Speedo Malaysia International Masters Swimming Championship	Malaysia	5			5
2017	Southeast Asia Pacific (SEAP) Singapore	Singapore	9	1		3
2017	FINA World Masters Championship	Budapest, Hungary				
2017	Japan Masters Swimming Sprint Championship	Tokyo, Japan	8			
2017	Speedo Malaysia International Masters Swimming, Championship	Kuching, Sarawak, Malaysia	7			7
2016	Southeast Asia Pacific (SEAP) Singapore	Singapore	5			3
2016	Japan Masters Long Course Swimming Championship (@ 3 months pregnant)	Japan	5	1		
2016	Singapore Masters Short Course Swimming Championship (@ 6 months pregnant)	Singapore	4	2	1	
2016	Speedo Malaysia International Masters Swimming Championship (@ 8 months pregnant)	Malaysia		2		

=== Malaysian Amateur Swimming achievements ===
Year	Achievements
1998-2004	Member of the Malaysian National Team
N/A	Multiple Malaysian Records Holder
1998 - 2008	Participated in 5 SUKMA (Malaysian Games)
2004	SUKMA (Malaysian Games): (gold) 6 gold medals, 5 national records; Awarded the Most Outstanding Female Athlete Award.; First time in Malaysian history for a swimmer to break 5 national records in a single meet
N/A	Qualified for Athens Olympic Games in 4 events
2001	Southeast Asian Games medalist, en route breaking the national record
2000	SUKMA (Malaysian Games) gold medal, national and meet record
1999	Malaysian Open gold medalist en route breaking 50m freestyle national record at age 15

=== Collegiate achievements in the United States ===
Year	Achievements
2001-2004	Drury University Athletic Scholarship recipient
N/A	Member of Drury University's Women's Varsity Swimming Team
N/A	Ranked top ten in 4 events in NCAA Division 2 top 50 times to date
N/A	Drury University team record holder of the 100, 200 Butterfly, 4 x 50 Freestyle Relay and 4 x 50 Medley Relay
N/A	NCAA Division 2 Championship qualifier – individual and team
2004	US National Champion & record holder in 200 Butterfly in NCAA Division 2 Swimming & Diving Championship
2004	Drury University's MVP Women's Program
2003-2004	Nominated and chosen as National Swimmer of the Week by collegeswimming.com twice in a season
2002-2004	Participated in varsity Conference and NCAA Division 2 Swimming & Diving Championship
2002-2004	Drury Panther Honor Roll
2002-2004	18 times NCAA 2 All-American honor by the College Swimming Coaches Association of America
2002-2004	8 times Conference (one of NCAA's conferences) Champion
2002-2003	Outstanding swimmer of the meet at Christmas Invitational at the University of Arkansas, Little Rock
2002	NCAA Division 2 Championship silver medal 200 fly
