= Safaa Rashed =

Iraqi weightlifter (born 1990)

Safaa Al-Jumaili
Personal information
- Full name: Safaa Rashid Mahmood Al-Jumaili
- Nationality: Iraqi
- Born: 1 January 1990 (age 36)
- Height: 1.72 m (5 ft 8 in)
- Weight: 85 kg (187 lb)

Sport
- Country: Iraq
- Sport: Weightlifting
- Event: 85 kg
Medal record
Men's weightlifting
Representing Iraq
Asian Games
Gold medal – first place	2018 Jakarta	85 kg
Islamic Solidarity Games
Gold medal – first place	2017 Baku	85 kg
Pan Arab Games
Bronze medal – third place	2011 Doha	85 kg
- Updated on 24 August 2018

Safaa Rashid Mahmood Al-Jumaili (born 1 January 1990, Diyala) is an Iraqi weightlifter competing in the 85 kg category. He competed at the 2012 Summer Olympics.

== Major results ==
Year	Venue	Weight	Snatch (kg)				Clean & Jerk (kg)				Total	Rank
Year	Venue	Weight	1	2	3	Rank	1	2	3	Rank	Total	Rank
Representing Iraq
Olympic Games
2012	(United Kingdom) London, Great Britain	85 kg	145	150	~~156~~	13	~~195~~	195	~~200~~	10	345	11
World Championships
2018	Ashgabat, Turkmenistan	81 kg	150	~~155~~	155	11	191	~~196~~	~~201~~	9	346	8
2010	Antalya, Turkey	77 kg	141	~~146~~	~~146~~	23	177	181	~~185~~	14	322	DSQ
2009	Goyang, South Korea	77 kg	130	137	140	21	175	~~185~~	~~185~~	21	315	20
Asian Games
2018	Jakarta, Indonesia	85 kg	155	159	~~162~~	2	196	~~202~~	202	1	361	1st place, gold medalist(s)
Asian Championships
2015	Phuket, Thailand	85 kg	145	150	155	6	196	~~200~~	~~200~~	4	351	6
2013	Astana, Kazakhstan	85 kg	~~155~~	~~155~~	156	2	195	~~202~~	~~202~~	2	351	DSQ
2012	Pyeongtaek, South Korea	85 kg	150	~~155~~	155	4	195	203	~~206~~	4	358	4
