= Sarra Lajnef =

Tunisian swimmer and triathlete

Personal information
- Born: 5 September 1989 (age 36) Tunisia
- Height: 5 ft 10 in (178 cm)
- Weight: 135 lb (61 kg)

Sport
- Sport: Swimming
- Strokes: Breastroke, Individual Medley
- Club: SLT
- College team: Florida Gators
Medal record
Representing United Arab Emirates
FINA Masters World Championships
Gold medal – first place	2019 Gwangju	3K Open Water
Gold medal – first place	2019 Gwangju	100m Breaststroke
Gold medal – first place	2019 Gwangju	200m Breaststroke
Gold medal – first place	2019 Gwangju	200m IM
Bronze medal – third place	2019 Gwangju	400m IM
Representing Tunisia
FINA Masters World Championships
Gold medal – first place	2015 Kazan	200m IM
Silver medal – second place	2015 Kazan	100m Breaststroke
Silver medal – second place	2015 Kazan	200m Breaststroke
Silver medal – second place	2015 Kazan	200m Freestyle
10th Senior African Swimming Championships
Gold medal – first place	2013 Casablanca	200m Breaststroke(Meet Record)
Silver medal – second place	2013 Casablanca	100m Breaststroke
Silver medal – second place	2013 Casablanca	50m Breaststroke
Silver medal – second place	2013 Casablanca	200m IM
Silver medal – second place	2013 Casablanca	400m IM
Silver medal – second place	2013 Casablanca	800m Freestyle relay
Bronze medal – third place	2013 Casablanca	200m Backstroke (Tunisian Record)
Bronze medal – third place	2013 Casablanca	400m Freestyle relay
All-Africa Games
Silver medal – second place	2011 Maputo	400m Freestyle (Tunisian Record)
Silver medal – second place	2011 Maputo	100m Breaststroke
Silver medal – second place	2011 Maputo	200m Breaststroke
Pan Arab Games
Silver medal – second place	2011 Doha	100m Breaststroke
Silver medal – second place	2011 Doha	200m Breaststroke
Silver medal – second place	2011 Doha	200m Backststroke (Tunisian Record)
Silver medal – second place	2011 Doha	400m Individual Medley
Silver medal – second place	2011 Doha	4x100m Freestyle Relay
Bronze medal – third place	2011 Doha	50m Breaststroke
Bronze medal – third place	2011 Doha	400m Freestyle
Bronze medal – third place	2011 Doha	200m Individual Medley
Bronze medal – third place	2011 Doha	4x200m Freestyle Relay
Bronze medal – third place	2011 Doha	4x100m Medley Relay

Sarra Lajnef (Arabic: سارة الأجنف, born 5 September 1989, in Tunisia) is a multisport athlete who represented Tunisia and United Arab Emirates at international level. She started as a swimmer to then expand her athletic career into rowing then triathlon. She broke 5 Guinness World Records, 2 in 2022, 2 in 2023 and the last one in 2026 during the Dubai Marathon.

At the World Master Games 2026, in Abu Dhabi, Lajnef was one of the most decorated athletes in the games with 7 medals in 3 different sports: Swimming, Rowing and Obstacle Course.

At the 2012 Summer Olympics in London, she became the first Tunisian female swimmer to qualify with FINA qualifying standards. She competed in the women's 200 metre breaststroke.

Lajnef is one of the most decorated Tunisian female swimmers and has to today the highest number of individual national records. She has won medals in several editions of the FINA World Masters Championships, African Games and Arab Games.

Lajnef was the UAE Rowing Champion between 2017 and 2023 in single, double, double mix, quad and quad mix.
