= Taekwondo at the 2011 Arab Games =

Taekwondo competition

Taekwondo at the 2011 Pan Arab Games
- Venue: Qatar Sports Club
- Location: Doha, Qatar

At the 2011 Pan Arab Games, the taekwondo events were held at Qatar Sports Club in Doha, Qatar from 14–17 December. A total of 16 events were contested.

== Medal summary ==
=== Men ===
Event	Gold	Silver	Bronze
-54kg	Tameem Al-Kubati (YEM)	Hussein Elsayed (EGY)	Ahmed Edbeb (LBA)
-54kg	Tameem Al-Kubati (YEM)	Hussein Elsayed (EGY)	Abderrahmane Guennouni (MAR)
-58kg	Tamer Bayoumi (EGY)	Mohamed Tlish (LBA)	Yaser Ba-Matraf (YEM)
-58kg	Tamer Bayoumi (EGY)	Mohamed Tlish (LBA)	Mohamed Dhair (QAT)
-63kg	Ouahid Briki (TUN)	Kanaan Kanaan (JOR)	Abdulrouf Gerwash (LBA)
-63kg	Ouahid Briki (TUN)	Kanaan Kanaan (JOR)	Ahmed Soliman (EGY)
-68kg	Abdallah Ahmed (EGY)	Hussein Bahadil (IRQ)	Khalid Boulabhaiem (MAR)
-68kg	Abdallah Ahmed (EGY)	Hussein Bahadil (IRQ)	Said Salih (QAT)
-74kg	Anas Aladarbi (JOR)	Ahmed Saad (QAT)	Ahmed Ali (PLE)
-74kg	Anas Aladarbi (JOR)	Ahmed Saad (QAT)	Sid Ali Larbi Cherif (ALG)
-80kg	Issam Chernoubi (MAR)	Nabil Hassan (JOR)	Mahmoud Abdelrahim (QAT)
-80kg	Issam Chernoubi (MAR)	Nabil Hassan (JOR)	Mahmoud Said (EGY)
-87kg	Ali Haggag (EGY)	Abdulkarim Danar (BHR)	Mohammed Kahla (PLE)
-87kg	Ali Haggag (EGY)	Abdulkarim Danar (BHR)	Salam Shammari (IRQ)
+87kg	Mohammad Imar (JOR)	Mohamed Hassan (EGY)	Abdelqader Aladhmi (QAT)
+87kg	Mohammad Imar (JOR)	Mohamed Hassan (EGY)	Abdelkader Zrouri (MAR)

=== Women ===
Event	Gold	Silver	Bronze
-46kg	Aya Ali (EGY)	Christina Altmaizy (JOR)	Fadia Farhani (TUN)
-46kg	Aya Ali (EGY)	Christina Altmaizy (JOR)	Naima Nadir (MAR)
-49kg	Sanaa Atabrour (MAR)	Radwa Nada (EGY)	Kaltham Al-Mutawah (QAT)
-49kg	Sanaa Atabrour (MAR)	Radwa Nada (EGY)	Dana Touran (JOR)
-53kg	Rahma Ben Ali (TUN)	Shahd Tarman (JOR)	Lamyaa Bekkali (MAR)
-53kg	Rahma Ben Ali (TUN)	Shahd Tarman (JOR)	Mennatallah Darwish (EGY)
-57kg	Hedaya Wahba (EGY)	Hajiba Enhari (MAR)	Marah Alsqour (JOR)
-57kg	Hedaya Wahba (EGY)	Hajiba Enhari (MAR)	Hadeel Fawzy (QAT)
-62kg	Nihel Borji (TUN)	Samira Saadalla (EGY)	Aisha Almansouri (QAT)
-62kg	Nihel Borji (TUN)	Samira Saadalla (EGY)	Naima Bakkal (MAR)
-67kg	Nancy Abu Bader (JOR)	Hend Mostafa (EGY)	Hakima El Meslahy (MAR)
-67kg	Nancy Abu Bader (JOR)	Hend Mostafa (EGY)	Mariam Mahmoud (SUD)
-73kg	Khaoula Ben Hamza (TUN)	Rima Ananbeh (JOR)	Abrar Alfahad (KUW)
-73kg	Khaoula Ben Hamza (TUN)	Rima Ananbeh (JOR)	Nahla Elwakil (EGY)
+73kg	Wiam Dislam (MAR)	Heba Morsi (EGY)	Linda Azzeddine (ALG)
+73kg	Wiam Dislam (MAR)	Heba Morsi (EGY)	Nadin Dawani (JOR)

== Medal table ==
* Host nation (Qatar)

Rank	Nation	Gold	Silver	Bronze	Total
1	Egypt	5	6	4	15
2	Tunisia	4	0	1	5
3	Jordan	3	5	3	11
4	Morocco	3	1	7	11
5	Yemen	1	0	1	2
6	Qatar*	0	1	7	8
7	Libya	0	1	2	3
8	Iraq	0	1	1	2
9	Bahrain	0	1	0	1
10	Algeria	0	0	2	2
10	Palestine	0	0	2	2
12	Kuwait	0	0	1	1
12	Sudan	0	0	1	1
Totals (13 entries)		16	16	32	64
