= Goalball at the 2011 Arab Games =

Goalball at the 2011 Pan Arab Games
- Venue: Al Sadd Sports Club
- Location: Doha, Qatar
- Dates: 11–16 December

At the 2011 Pan Arab Games, the goalball events were held at Al Sadd Sports Club in Doha, Qatar from 13–20 December. A total of 11 teams played with only a men's tournament played.

== Results ==
Tournament Results

=== Group stage ===
| Qualified for the quarterfinals |

==== Group A ====
| Team | W | D | L | GF | GA | GD |
|---|---|---|---|---|---|---|
| Algeria | 5 | 0 | 0 | 55 | 7 | +48 |
| Egypt | 4 | 0 | 1 | 49 | 21 | +28 |
| Qatar | 3 | 0 | 2 | 39 | 29 | +10 |
| Palestine | 2 | 0 | 3 | 26 | 45 | -19 |
| Sudan | 1 | 0 | 4 | 18 | 49 | -31 |
| Lebanon | 0 | 0 | 5 | 21 | 57 | -36 |

2011-12-13
| Algeria | 10-0 | Palestine |
| Lebanon | 3-13 | Egypt |
| Sudan | 0-10 | Qatar |
2011-12-14
| Egypt | 10-4 | Qatar |
| Lebanon | 8-11 | Palestine |
| Algeria | 10-0 | Sudan |
2011-12-15
| Palestine | 1-11 | Egypt |
| Sudan | 13-8 | Lebanon |
| Algeria | 13-3 | Qatar |
2011-12-16
| Palestine | 5-13 | Qatar |
| Algeria | 11-1 | Lebanon |
| Sudan | 2-12 | Egypt |
2011-12-17
| Sudan | 3-9 | Palestine |
| Algeria | 11-3 | Egypt |
| Lebanon | 1-9 | Qatar |

==== Group B ====
| Team | W | D | L | GF | GA | GD |
|---|---|---|---|---|---|---|
| Iraq | 4 | 0 | 0 | 41 | 6 | +35 |
| Saudi Arabia | 3 | 0 | 1 | 28 | 17 | +11 |
| United Arab Emirates | 2 | 0 | 2 | 20 | 29 | -9 |
| Libya | 1 | 0 | 3 | 23 | 29 | -6 |
| Bahrain | 0 | 0 | 4 | 11 | 42 | -31 |

2011-12-13
| Iraq | 9-4 | Saudi Arabia |
| Bahrain | 4-14 | Libya |
2011-12-14
| Bahrain | 3-12 | Saudi Arabia |
| Iraq | 11-1 | United Arab Emirates |
2011-12-15
| Libya | 6-10 | United Arab Emirates |
| Iraq | 10-0 | Bahrain |
2011-12-16
| Saudi Arabia | 4-2 | Libya |
| United Arab Emirates | 6-4 | Bahrain |
2011-12-17
| Iraq | 11-1 | Libya |
| United Arab Emirates | 3-8 | Saudi Arabia |

=== Tournament bracket ===
Quarterfinals (2011-12-19)
1 | Iraq | 10
4 | Palestine | 0
2 | Egypt | 12
3 | United Arab Emirates | 4
1 | Algeria | 6
4 | Libya | 1
2 | Saudi Arabia | 3
3 | Qatar | 2

Semifinals (2011-12-20)
Iraq | 11
Egypt | 5
Algeria | 8
Saudi Arabia | 1

Gold medal game (2011-12-20)
Iraq | 5
Algeria | 2
Bronze medal game
Egypt | 4
Saudi Arabia | 6

== Final standing ==
| Rank | Team |
|---|---|
| Gold medal | Iraq |
| Silver medal | Algeria |
| Bronze medal | Saudi Arabia |
| 4 | Egypt |
| 5 | Qatar |
| 6 | United Arab Emirates |
| 7 | Libya |
| 8 | Palestine |
| 9 | Bahrain |
| 10 | Sudan |
| 11 | Lebanon |
