= Mohamed Haddouche =

Algerian chess grandmaster (born 1984)

Personal information
- Born: 19 August 1984 (age 41) Sidi Bel Abbes, Algeria

Chess career
- Country: Algeria
- Title: Grandmaster (2014)
- FIDE rating: 2490 (July 2026)
- Peak rating: 2529 (March 2015)

Mohamed Haddouche is an Algerian chess grandmaster.

== Chess career ==
Haddouche is an eight-time winner of the Algerian Chess Championship, most recently in 2017.

He has represented his country in five Chess Olympiads: 2006, 2008, 2010, 2012 and 2014. He has won three medals in chess events at the African Games: gold and silver in 2003, and a second gold in 2007. He has also won three medals in chess events at the Pan Arab Games: silver and bronze in 2007, and gold in 2011.

He played in the Chess World Cup 2017, being defeated by Ding Liren in the first round.

He took second place at the 2018 Ivory Coast Rapid and Blitz Invitational.

He won the Arab Individual Chess Championship in Sharjah, UAE in 2018.
