= Karate at the 2011 Arab Games =

Karate competition

Karate at the 2011 Pan Arab Games
- Venue: Qatar Sports Club
- Location: Doha, Qatar
- Dates: 19-21 December

At the 2011 Pan Arab Games, the karate events were held at Qatar Sports Club in Doha, Qatar from 19–21 December. A total of 16 events were contested.

== Medal summary ==
=== Men ===
Event	Gold	Silver	Bronze
-60kg	Abdullah Jamal Dalool (QAT)	Mohamed Aly (EGY)	Abdullah Almutairi (KUW)
-60kg	Abdullah Jamal Dalool (QAT)	Mohamed Aly (EGY)	Redouane Ksseksou (MAR)
-67kg	Abdelilah Boujedi (MAR)	Mohamed Hasnaoui (TUN)	Abdullah Alotaibi (KUW)
-67kg	Abdelilah Boujedi (MAR)	Mohamed Hasnaoui (TUN)	Abdulaziz Jamal (QAT)
-75kg	Nizar Halim (MAR)	Marwan Al Khammassi (TUN)	Wualid Bouabaoub (ALG)
-75kg	Nizar Halim (MAR)	Marwan Al Khammassi (TUN)	Tamer Mourssy (EGY)
-84kg	Nabil Hamidouche (ALG)	Younis Alaaraj (QAT)	Fahad Alrashidi (KSA)
-84kg	Nabil Hamidouche (ALG)	Younis Alaaraj (QAT)	Hany Keshta (EGY)
+84kg	Ossama Mansour (EGY)	Majed Saleh (KSA)	Missipsa Hamadini (ALG)
+84kg	Ossama Mansour (EGY)	Majed Saleh (KSA)	Mohamed Ridha Ouaz (TUN)
Individual Kata	Marwan Almaazmi (UAE)	Mostafa Khalil (EGY)	Adham Abdulnassir (QAT)
Individual Kata	Marwan Almaazmi (UAE)	Mostafa Khalil (EGY)	Idrees Saeed (IRQ)
Team Kata	Egypt (EGY); Ibrahim Ahmed; Mostafa Khalil; Ahmed Shawky	United Arab Emirates (UAE); Marwan Almaazmi; Hamad Alnajjar; Humaid Alzarouni	Morocco (MAR); Billal Benkacem; Adnane El Hakimi; Mohammed El Hanni
Team Kata	Egypt (EGY); Ibrahim Ahmed; Mostafa Khalil; Ahmed Shawky	United Arab Emirates (UAE); Marwan Almaazmi; Hamad Alnajjar; Humaid Alzarouni	Qatar (QAT); Adham Abdulnassir; Ahmed Alaa Adem; Ali Ahmed Hamad
Team Kumite	Egypt (EGY); Mohamed Aly; Ahmed Elshafei; Hany Keshta; Ossama Mansour; Mohanad Mohammed; Tamer Mourssy; Ahmed Solyman	Morocco (MAR); Soufiane Boudabouz; Abdelilah Boujedi; Moatassim El Fouzari; Nizar Halim; Redouane Ksseksou; Hicham Rahi	Algeria (ALG); Wualid Bouabaoub; Chaffik Boualaouad; Abdelkrim Bouamria; Abderezak Boucetta; Houssam Halouane; Missipsa Hamadini; Nabil Hamidouche
Team Kumite	Egypt (EGY); Mohamed Aly; Ahmed Elshafei; Hany Keshta; Ossama Mansour; Mohanad Mohammed; Tamer Mourssy; Ahmed Solyman	Morocco (MAR); Soufiane Boudabouz; Abdelilah Boujedi; Moatassim El Fouzari; Nizar Halim; Redouane Ksseksou; Hicham Rahi	Kuwait (KUW); Saidhashem Alali; Ahmad Aldousari; Abdullah Almutairi; Hamad Alnweam; Abdullah Alotaibi; Saad Alrashidi; Ahmad Mohammad

=== Women ===
Event	Gold	Silver	Bronze
-50kg	Yasmeen Rashed (EGY)	Manayer Salmeen (KUW)	Raghed Almohtasib (JOR)
-50kg	Yasmeen Rashed (EGY)	Manayer Salmeen (KUW)	Dyhia Chikhi (ALG)
-55kg	Dhouha Ben Othman (TUN)	Ilhem Eldjou (ALG)	Nadia Abdelrahman (EGY)
-55kg	Dhouha Ben Othman (TUN)	Ilhem Eldjou (ALG)	Boolein Najjar (JOR)
-61kg	Randa Fayad (EGY)	Nesrine Kherrar (ALG)	Bouthaina Hasnaoui (TUN)
-61kg	Randa Fayad (EGY)	Nesrine Kherrar (ALG)	Soukaina Zahraoui (MAR)
-68kg	Rahima Nouasse (MAR)	Zahira Abdelkader (ALG)	Heba Abdelhamid (EGY)
-68kg	Rahima Nouasse (MAR)	Zahira Abdelkader (ALG)	Maio Khalil (PLE)
+68kg	Kaouther Hasnaoui (TUN)	Manar Shath (JOR)	Abrar Abdulsayed (KUW)
+68kg	Kaouther Hasnaoui (TUN)	Manar Shath (JOR)	Fatima Zohra Nouasse (MAR)
Individual Kata	Kamelia Hadj Said (ALG)	Sarah Aly (EGY)	Salma Assila (MAR)
Individual Kata	Kamelia Hadj Said (ALG)	Sarah Aly (EGY)	Manayer Salmeen (KUW)
Team Kata	Egypt (EGY); Randa Abdelaziz; Nehal Alashkar; Mai Salama	Algeria (ALG); Selma Bedja; Kamelia Hadj Said; Yasmine Mouloud	Kuwait (KUW); Abrar Abdulsayed; Sara Hamzah; Manayer Salmeen
Team Kata	Egypt (EGY); Randa Abdelaziz; Nehal Alashkar; Mai Salama	Algeria (ALG); Selma Bedja; Kamelia Hadj Said; Yasmine Mouloud	Morocco (MAR); Fatima El Kahiri; Chadia Errbiay; Ahlam Nadir
Team Kumite	Egypt (EGY); Yasmeen Rashed; Nadia Abdelrahman; Randa Fayad; Heba Abdekhamid	Tunisia (TUN); Faten Aissa; Dhouha Ben Othman; Bouthaina Hasnaoui; Kaouther Hasnaoui	Algeria (ALG); Zahira Abdelkader; Fatma Zohra Chibaoui; Ilhem Eldjou; Nesrine Kherrar
Team Kumite	Egypt (EGY); Yasmeen Rashed; Nadia Abdelrahman; Randa Fayad; Heba Abdekhamid	Tunisia (TUN); Faten Aissa; Dhouha Ben Othman; Bouthaina Hasnaoui; Kaouther Hasnaoui	Morocco (MAR); Jihane Jabour; Soukaina Zahraoui; Rahima Nouasse; Fatima Nouasse

== Medal table ==
* Host nation (Qatar)

Rank	Nation	Gold	Silver	Bronze	Total
1	Egypt	7	3	4	14
2	Morocco	3	1	7	11
3	Algeria	2	4	5	11
4	Tunisia	2	3	2	7
5	Qatar*	1	1	3	5
6	United Arab Emirates	1	1	0	2
7	Kuwait	0	1	6	7
8	Jordan	0	1	2	3
9	Saudi Arabia	0	1	1	2
10	Iraq	0	0	1	1
10	Palestine	0	0	1	1
Totals (11 entries)		16	16	32	64
