= Judo at the 2011 Arab Games =

Judo competition

Judo Judo at the 2011 Pan Arab Games
- Venue: Qatar SC Stadium
- Location: Doha, Qatar
- Dates: 10–12 December

Competition at external databases
- Links: JudoInside

At the 2011 Pan Arab Games, the judo events were held at Qatar Sports Club in Doha, Qatar from 10–12 December. A total of 16 events were contested.

== Medal summary ==
=== Men ===
Event	Gold	Silver	Bronze
-60 kg	Ali Khousrof (YEM)	Lyes Saker (ALG)	Fraj Dhouibi (TUN)
-60 kg	Ali Khousrof (YEM)	Lyes Saker (ALG)	Yassine Moudatir (MAR)
-66 kg	Houssem Khalfaoui (TUN)	Rachid El Kadiri (MAR)	Mohammad Alajmi (KUW)
-66 kg	Houssem Khalfaoui (TUN)	Rachid El Kadiri (MAR)	Ahmed Elkawisah (LBA)
-73 kg	Hussein Hafiz (EGY)	El Arbi Grini (ALG)	Hamza Barhoumi (TUN)
-73 kg	Hussein Hafiz (EGY)	El Arbi Grini (ALG)	Alaa Bassou (MAR)
-81 kg	Hatem Abd el Akher (EGY)	Vacant	Hussein Al-Aameri (IRQ)
-81 kg	Hatem Abd el Akher (EGY)	Vacant	Abderrahmane Benamadi (ALG)
-90 kg	Amar Benikhlef (ALG)	Aly Darwish (EGY)	Ghanem Aldikan (KUW)
-90 kg	Amar Benikhlef (ALG)	Aly Darwish (EGY)	Mohamed El Assri (MAR)
-100 kg	Yousef Alenezi (KUW)	Vacant	Adil Fikri (MAR)
-100 kg	Yousef Alenezi (KUW)	Vacant	Yacine Meskine (ALG)
+100 kg	El Mehdi Malki (MAR)	Faical Jaballah (TUN)	Mohamed Taha (EGY)
+100 kg	El Mehdi Malki (MAR)	Faical Jaballah (TUN)	Bilel Zouani (ALG)
Open	Faical Jaballah (TUN)	Ghanem Aldikan (KUW)	Jalal Benalla (MAR)
Open	Faical Jaballah (TUN)	Ghanem Aldikan (KUW)	Mohamed Tayeb (ALG)

=== Women ===
Event	Gold	Silver	Bronze
-48 kg	Amani El Khalfaoui (TUN)	Sabrina Saidi (ALG)	Salha Al-Badi (QAT)
-48 kg	Amani El Khalfaoui (TUN)	Sabrina Saidi (ALG)	Wafae Idrissi Chorfi (MAR)
-52 kg	Hanane Kerroumi (MAR)	Hela Ayari (TUN)	Lea Farhat (LIB)
-52 kg	Hanane Kerroumi (MAR)	Hela Ayari (TUN)	Soraya Haddad (ALG)
-57 kg	Meriem Moussa (ALG)	Fatima Ait Ali (MAR)	Nesria Jlassi (TUN)
-57 kg	Meriem Moussa (ALG)	Fatima Ait Ali (MAR)	Sally Raguib (DJI)
-63 kg	Rizlen Zouak (MAR)	Kahina Saidi (ALG)	Caren Chammas (LIB)
-63 kg	Rizlen Zouak (MAR)	Kahina Saidi (ALG)	Asma El Bjaoui (TUN)
-70 kg	Assmaa Niang (MAR)	Houda Miled (TUN)	Aicha Benaderahmane (ALG)
-70 kg	Assmaa Niang (MAR)	Houda Miled (TUN)	Sahar Husain (KUW)
-78 kg	Hana Mereghni (TUN)	Amina Temmar (ALG)	Rawdha Al-Abdulla (QAT)
-78 kg	Hana Mereghni (TUN)	Amina Temmar (ALG)	Odette Malkoun (LIB)
+78 kg	Nihel Cheikh Rouhou (TUN)	Sonia Asselah (ALG)	Sarah Alsalem (KUW)
+78 kg	Nihel Cheikh Rouhou (TUN)	Sonia Asselah (ALG)	Rania El Kilali (MAR)
Open	Sonia Asselah (ALG)	Caren Chammas (LIB)	Nihel Cheikh Rouhou (TUN)
Open	Sonia Asselah (ALG)	Caren Chammas (LIB)	Rania El Kilali (MAR)

== Doping ==
Two athletes from Judo were caught using performance-enhancing drugs. Gold medalist Safouane Attaf from Morocco in Men's -81 kg and gold medalist Gaballa Mahmoud from Egypt, which was a mistake of his doctor who prescribed a flu medicine which had an extract of a substance included in the doping list, in the Men's -100 kg were caught and stripped of their medals. The silver medalists have since been upgraded to gold, however no bronze medalists have moved up to silver.

== Medal table ==
* Host nation (Qatar)

Rank	Nation	Gold	Silver	Bronze	Total
1	Tunisia	5	3	5	13
2	Morocco	4	2	8	14
3	Algeria	3	6	6	15
4	Egypt	2	1	1	4
5	Kuwait	1	1	4	6
6	Yemen	1	0	0	1
7	Lebanon	0	1	3	4
8	Qatar*	0	0	2	2
9	Djibouti	0	0	1	1
9	Iraq	0	0	1	1
9	Libya	0	0	1	1
Totals (11 entries)		16	14	32	62
