= Wrestling at the 2011 Arab Games =

2011 wrestling event

Wrestling at the 2011 Pan Arab Games
- Venue: Aspire Zone
- Location: Doha, Qatar

At the 2011 Pan Arab Games, the wrestling events were held at Aspire Zone in Doha, Qatar from 16–20 December. A total of 14 events were contested.

== Medal summary ==
=== Men ===
==== Freestyle ====
Event	Gold	Silver	Bronze
-55kg	Anmar Rashed (IRQ)	Basheer El-Yamani (YEM)	Mohammed Alhenaitem (QAT)
-60kg	Hassan Ibrahim (EGY)	Abdullrahman Ibrahim (QAT)	Billel Ben Douissa (TUN)
-60kg	Hassan Ibrahim (EGY)	Abdullrahman Ibrahim (QAT)	Ali Walid Haqi (IRQ)
-66kg	Abdou Ahmed (EGY)	Haithem Belaiech (TUN)	Ali Mohamed Al-Obaidi (IRQ)
-66kg	Abdou Ahmed (EGY)	Haithem Belaiech (TUN)	Rabah Siramdane (ALG)
-74kg	Ramzi Almarafi (JOR)	Mohamed Al Qubaisi (UAE)	Wissam Almoalla (IRQ)
-74kg	Ramzi Almarafi (JOR)	Mohamed Al Qubaisi (UAE)	Walid Hasabelnabi (EGY)
-84kg	Adnen Rhimi (TUN)	Ahmed Aboumansour (EGY)	Farqad Al-Mwali (IRQ)
-84kg	Adnen Rhimi (TUN)	Ahmed Aboumansour (EGY)	Mahmoud Hamid (JOR)
-96kg	Saleh Emara (EGY)	Rochdi Rhimi (TUN)	Salih Hamid (SUD)
-96kg	Saleh Emara (EGY)	Rochdi Rhimi (TUN)	Mohammed Suhalh (IRQ)
-120kg	Mohammed Abdulmalek (IRQ)	Hani Marafi (JOR)	Abdelraouf Eldesoki (EGY)
-120kg	Mohammed Abdulmalek (IRQ)	Hani Marafi (JOR)	Salem Salem (KSA)

==== Greco-Roman ====
Event	Gold	Silver	Bronze
-55kg	Mohammed Al-Saedi (IRQ)	Mostafa Mohamed (EGY)	Mohammed Bouterfassa (ALG)
-55kg	Mohammed Al-Saedi (IRQ)	Mostafa Mohamed (EGY)	Saber Bouthouri (TUN)
-60kg	Ahmed Al-Saeedi (IRQ)	Sayed Hamed (EGY)	Omar Abdulqader (QAT)
-60kg	Ahmed Al-Saeedi (IRQ)	Sayed Hamed (EGY)	Tarek Aziz Benaissa (ALG)
-66kg	Ibrahim Abdelbaki (EGY)	Taha Al-Salihi (IRQ)	Yousef Hasanat (JOR)
-66kg	Ibrahim Abdelbaki (EGY)	Taha Al-Salihi (IRQ)	Mohamed Serir (ALG)
-74kg	Zied Ayet Ikram (TUN)	Islam Tolba (EGY)	Ramzi Almarafi (JOR)
-74kg	Zied Ayet Ikram (TUN)	Islam Tolba (EGY)	Aymen Mohsen (IRQ)
-84kg	Karam Gaber (EGY)	Messaoud Zeghdane (ALG)	Haikel Achouri (TUN)
-84kg	Karam Gaber (EGY)	Messaoud Zeghdane (ALG)	Adil Al-Ayadi (IRQ)
-96kg	Yahia Abu Tabeekh (JOR)	Houssine Ayari (TUN)	Mostafa Hamed (EGY)
-96kg	Yahia Abu Tabeekh (JOR)	Houssine Ayari (TUN)	Saif Ali Qasim (IRQ)
-120kg	Hani Marafi (JOR)	Abdelrahman Eltarabily (EGY)	Radhouane Chebbi (TUN)
-120kg	Hani Marafi (JOR)	Abdelrahman Eltarabily (EGY)	Zakaria Echiheb (MAR)

== Medal table ==
* Host nation (Qatar)

Rank	Nation	Gold	Silver	Bronze	Total
1	Egypt	5	5	3	13
2	Iraq	4	1	8	13
3	Jordan	3	1	3	7
4	Tunisia	2	3	4	9
5	Algeria	0	1	4	5
6	Qatar*	0	1	2	3
7	United Arab Emirates	0	1	0	1
7	Yemen	0	1	0	1
9	Morocco	0	0	1	1
9	Saudi Arabia	0	0	1	1
9	Sudan	0	0	1	1
Totals (11 entries)		14	14	27	55

== Officials ==
The Jury of Appeal consisted of Ibrahim Cicioglu (Turkey), Bahman Talebi (Iran), Regine Le Gleut (France), and Anastasia Migkipi (Greece). Migkipi and Le Gleut were the only women serving on the five-member Jury of Appeal, reflecting the increasing participation of women in senior technical officiating and governance roles in international wrestling.
