= Gymnastics at the 2011 Arab Games =

Gymnastics at the 2011 Pan Arab Games
- Venue: Aspire Zone
- Location: Doha, Qatar
- Dates: 10–20 December

At the 2011 Pan Arab Games, the gymnastics events were held at Aspire Dome in Doha, Qatar from 10 to 14 December (Artistic) and 19–20 December (Trampoline). A total of 15 events were contested.

== Medal summary ==
=== Men ===
==== Artistic ====
Event	Gold	Silver	Bronze
Individual All-Around	Mohamed El-Saharty (EGY)	Ashraf Mostafa (EGY)	Hillal Metidji (ALG)
Team All-Around	Egypt (EGY); Mohamed El-Saharty; Ashraf Mostafa; Islam Shahin; Mohamed Srour; Ali Zahran	Qatar (QAT); Ahmed Al Dayani; Nasser Al Hamad; Ahmad Al Romaihi; Mahmood Al Sadi; Malek Al Yahri	Algeria (ALG); Amine Airour; Sid Ali Ferdjani; Mohamed Amir Hacib; Hillal Metidji; Belkacem Tahi
Floor	Wajdi Bouallègue (TUN)	Jad Mazahreh (JOR)	Nashwan Al-Harazi (YEM)
Horizontal Bar	Mohamed El-Saharty (EGY)	Mahmood Al Sadi (QAT)	Jad Mazahreh (JOR)
Parallel Bars	Sid Ali Ferdjani (ALG)	Islam Shahin (EGY)	Mohamed El-Saharty (EGY)
Pommel Horse	Mohamed El-Saharty (EGY)	Nashwan Al-Harazi (YEM)	Islam Shahin (EGY)
Rings	Ali Zahran (EGY)	Wajdi Bouallègue (TUN)	Mahmood Al Sadi (QAT)
Vault	Mohamed El-Saharty (EGY)	Jad Mazahreh (JOR)	Mohamed Srour (EGY)

==== Trampoline ====
Event	Gold	Silver	Bronze
Individual	Tewfik Chikhi (ALG)	Abdulla Fayrouz (QAT)	Faraj Al Hamad (QAT)

=== Women ===
==== Artistic ====
Event	Gold	Silver	Bronze
Individual All-Around	Salma El Said (EGY)	Shaden Wohdan (QAT)	Aya Mahgoub (EGY)
Beam	Shaden Wohdan (QAT)	Salma El Said (EGY)	Aya Mahgoub (EGY)
Floor	Shaden Wohdan (QAT)	Salma El Said (EGY)	Chaimaa Zemzami (MAR)
Uneven Bars	Salma El Said (EGY)	Aya Mahgoub (EGY)	Shaden Wohdan (QAT)
Vault	Aya Mahgoub (EGY)	Shaden Wohdan (QAT)	Chaimaa Zemzami (MAR)

==== Trampoline ====
Event	Gold	Silver	Bronze
Individual	Fatima Salem Abdulla (QAT)	Nadeen Wehdan (QAT)	Ashrakat Ismail (EGY)

== Medal table ==
* Host nation (Qatar)

Rank	Nation	Gold	Silver	Bronze	Total
1	Egypt	9	5	6	20
2	Qatar*	3	6	3	12
3	Algeria	2	0	2	4
4	Tunisia	1	1	0	2
5	Jordan	0	2	1	3
6	Yemen	0	1	1	2
7	Morocco	0	0	2	2
Totals (7 entries)		15	15	15	45
