= Weightlifting at the 2011 Arab Games =

Weightlifting at the 2011 Pan Arab Games
- Venue: Al Dana Hall
- Location: Doha, Qatar

At the 2011 Pan Arab Games, the weightlifting events were held at Al Dana Hall in Doha, Qatar from 13–17 December. A total of 12 events were contested.

== Medal summary ==
=== Men ===
Event	Gold	Silver	Bronze
-56 kg	Suhail Al Kulaibi (OMA)	Mansour Al-Saleem (KSA)	Yasir Al-Hamadani (IRQ)
-62 kg	Karrar Kadhum (IRQ)	Ahmed Saad (EGY)	Mohammed Ali (IRQ)
-69 kg	Mohamed Abdelbaki (EGY)	Hamza Jomni (TUN)	Ali Al Eduhailib (KSA)
-77 kg	Ibrahim Abdelbaki (EGY)	Amir Belhout (ALG)	Marwan Abdussalam (LBA)
-85 kg	Ragab Abdalla (EGY)	Tarek Abdelazim (EGY)	Safaa Al-Jumaili (IRQ)
-94 kg	Gaber Mohamed (EGY)	Mohamed Doghmane (TUN)	Riyadh Al-Tameemi (IRQ)
-105 kg	Ibrahim Moursi (EGY)	Husam Hamada (PLE)	Mohamed Ben Said (LBA)
+105 kg	Abdelrahman Mohamed Elsayed (EGY)	Hassan Alhusaini (KUW)	Issa Ibrahim Al Ansari (QAT)

=== Women ===
Event	Gold	Silver	Bronze
-53 kg	Soumaya Fatnassi (TUN)	Kenza Filali (ALG)	Asmahan Elayyan (JOR)
-58 kg	Nadia Hosni (TUN)	Alya Agalain (SUD)	Vacant
-75 kg	Abir Khalil (EGY)	Mohasin Mohamed (SUD)	Abbas Yasmin (UAE)
+75 kg	Nahla Mohamed (EGY)	Touria Kendouci (ALG)	Rola Ali (JOR)

== Doping ==
One athlete from Weightlifting was caught using performance-enhancing drugs. Silver medalist Ayecha Albalooshi from United Arab Emirates who participated in Women's -58 kg was caught and stripped of her medal. The bronze medalist has since been upgraded to silver, however as all of the other participants weren't able to finish the event no one has been upgraded to bronze.

== Medal table ==
Rank	Nation	Gold	Silver	Bronze	Total
1	Egypt	8	2	0	10
2	Tunisia	2	2	0	4
3	Iraq	1	0	4	5
4	Oman	1	0	0	1
5	Algeria	0	3	0	3
6	Sudan	0	2	0	2
7	Saudi Arabia	0	1	1	2
8	Kuwait	0	1	0	1
8	Palestine	0	1	0	1
10	Jordan	0	0	2	2
10	Libya	0	0	2	2
12	Qatar	0	0	1	1
12	United Arab Emirates	0	0	1	1
Totals (13 entries)		12	12	11	35
