= Sailing at the 2011 Arab Games =

Sailing at the 2011 Pan Arab Games
- Venue: Doha Sailing Club
- Location: Doha, Qatar

At the 2011 Pan Arab Games, the sailing events were held at Doha Sailing Club in Doha, Qatar from 14–20 December. A total of 6 events were contested.

== Medal summary ==
=== Men ===
Event	Gold	Silver	Bronze
Laser	Abdulrahim Sadiq (BHR)	Zine Khairat (TUN)	Riyadh Djemai (ALG)
Optimist	Hamood Al Zaidi (UAE)	Dhiaeddine Chaabane (TUN)	Suhail Al Ghailani (UAE)
470	Bahrain (BHR); Ahmed Abdulla Sadiq; Ebrahim Abdulla Sadiq	Qatar (QAT); Mohammed Almuhanandi; Jassim Alsulaiti	Kuwait (KUW); Saoud Almasoud; Salem Qaly

=== Women ===
Event	Gold	Silver	Bronze
Optimist	Khouloud Mansy (EGY)	Ines Gmati (TUN)	Ismahane Horch (ALG)

=== Open ===
Event	Gold	Silver	Bronze
Laser 4.7	Faris Ahmad Albakri (QAT)	Mohamed Ben Naceur (TUN)	Billel Nedjari (ALG)
Laser Radial	Youssef Akrout (TUN)	Ahmad Abdullateef (KUW)	Mohamed Midoun (ALG)

== Medal table ==
* Host nation (Qatar)

Rank	Nation	Gold	Silver	Bronze	Total
1	Bahrain	2	0	0	2
2	Tunisia	1	4	0	5
3	Qatar*	1	1	0	2
4	United Arab Emirates	1	0	1	2
5	Egypt	1	0	0	1
6	Kuwait	0	1	1	2
7	Algeria	0	0	4	4
Totals (7 entries)		6	6	6	18
