= Khadidja Latreche =

Algerian chess player (born 1990)

Personal information
- Born: 1990 (age 35–36)

Chess career
- Country: Algeria
- Title: Woman International Master (2013)
- Peak rating: 1936 (November 2011)

Khadidja Latreche (born 1990) is an Algerian chess player. She played for the Algerian women's teams which won the gold medal at the 2011 Pan Arab Games and silver medal at the 2011 All-African Games, and which competed at the 2008, 2010 and 2012 Chess Olympiads.
