= List of African Games medalists in swimming (men) =

This is the complete list of men's African Games medalists in swimming from 1965 to 2019. Before 2015 it was known as the All-Africa Games.

== Men's events ==
=== 50m Freestyle ===
Event	Gold		Silver		Bronze	
1987	Mohamed Youssef; Egypt	24.43s	Samir Bouchlaghem; Tunisia		Heath Wirthe; Zimbabwe; Mohamed Diop; Senegal	
1991	Pedro Lima; Angola	23.98s	Mohamed Youssef; Egypt	24.28s	Musa Bakare; Nigeria	24.35s
1995	Peter Williams; South Africa	?	Donald Morrison; South Africa	?	Tamer Hamed; Egypt	?
1999	Brendon Dedekind; South Africa	22.36; GR	Nicholas Folker; South Africa	22.83	Salim Iles; Algeria	23.02
2003	Salim Iles; Algeria	22.71	Stephan Ackerman; South Africa	23.66	Kurt Muller; South Africa	23.83
2007	Salim Iles; Algeria	22.34	Jason Dunford; Kenya	22.73	Gideon Louw; South Africa	22.81
2011	Gideon Louw; South Africa	22.34	David Dunford; Kenya	22.74	Jason Dunford; Kenya	22.87
2015	Douglas Erasmus; South Africa	22.61	Mazen El Kamash; Egypt	22.97	Clayton Jimmie; South Africa	22.98
2019	Ali Khalafalla; Egypt	22.17; GR	Oussama Sahnoune; Algeria	22.19	Brad Tandy; South Africa	22.21

=== 100m Freestyle ===
Event	Gold		Silver		Bronze	
1965	Marwan Elghizaoui; Egypt	57.5s	Ahmed Sayed Zine; Egypt	58.9s	Mohamed Ladjali; Algeria	01:02.2
1973	Alaa Gabr; Egypt	57.00s	Ali Gnawi; Egypt	57.02s	Ali Gharbi; Tunisia	57.20s
1978	Ali Gharbi; Tunisia	55.94s	Bernard Gueye; Ivory Coast	55.86s	John Ebito; Nigeria	55.42s
1987	Mohamed Youssef; Egypt	53.84s	Ilyes Mahfoudhia; Algeria	54.55s	Vaughan Smith; Zimbabwe	54.62s
1991	Moustafa Amine; Egypt	53.74s	Abdallah Benchekour; Algeria	53.87s	Amine Ahmed Amine; Egypt	53.91s
1995	Salim Iles; Algeria	?	Mark Duncan; South Africa	?	Tamer Zenhum; Egypt	?
1999	Brendon Dedekind; South Africa	50.50	Salim Iles; Algeria	50.58	Nicholas Folker; South Africa	50.61
2003	Salim Iles; Algeria	50.32	Stephan Ackerman; South Africa	51.54	Haitham Hazem; Egypt	52.26
2007	Salim Iles; Algeria	49.38	Nabil Kebbab; Algeria	49.82	Jason Dunford; Kenya	50.09
2011	David Dunford; Kenya	49.48	Jason Dunford; Kenya	49.71	Gideon Louw; South Africa	49.80
2015	Clayton Jimmie; South Africa	49.93	Mohamed Samy; Egypt	49.97	Caydon Muller; South Africa	50.28
2019	Oussama Sahnoune; Algeria	48.97; GR	Ali Khalafalla; Egypt	49.81	Mohamed Samy; Egypt	49.85

=== 200m Freestyle ===
Event	Gold		Silver		Bronze	
1965	Ahmed Mahmoud Rezk; Egypt	02:14.2	Marwan Elghizaoui; Egypt	02:20.1	Alassane Gueye; Senegal	02:24.0
1973	Ali Gnawi; Egypt	02:03.6	Ali Gharbi; Tunisia	02:05.3	Youssef Ahmed Amine; Egypt	02:06.2
1978	Ali Gharbi; Tunisia	01:56.2	Habib Soukni; Tunisia	02:02.8	Khaled Abu Gabal; Egypt	02:03.6
1987	Moustafa Amine; Egypt	01:59.1	Ibrahim Tamer; Egypt		Sofiane Benchekour; Algeria	
1991	Hatem Seif; Egypt	01:54.7	Moustafa Amine; Egypt	01:56.9	Abdallah Benchekour; Algeria	01:59.3
1995	Salim Iles; Algeria	?	Gary Alberty; South Africa	?	Mark Jollands; South Africa	?
1999	Herman Louw; South Africa	1:52.68	Glen Walshaw; Zimbabwe	1:55.85	Terence Parkin; South Africa	1:56.78
2003	Oussama Mellouli; Tunisia	1:52.94	Stephan Ackerman; South Africa	1:54.17	Nic Wilson; South Africa	1:54.82
2007	Nabil Kebbab; Algeria	1:50.30; NR	Jean Basson; South Africa	1:50.:33	Jason Dunford; Kenya	1:50.64
2011	Ahmed Mathlouthi; Tunisia	1:48.95	Darian Townsend; South Africa	1:49.04	Jean Basson; South Africa	1:51.06
2015	Myles Brown; South Africa	1:47.77 GR	Marwan El Kamash; Egypt	1:48.58	Ahmed Mathlouthi; Tunisia	1:49.29
2019	Marwan Elkamash; Egypt	1:49.10	Mohamed Agili; Tunisia	1:49.22	Yassin Elshamaa; Egypt	1:49.40

=== 400m Freestyle ===
Event	Gold		Silver		Bronze	
1965	Ahmed Mahmoud Rezk; Egypt	04:45.0	Mahmoud Magdy Moustafa; Egypt	04:55.8	Hakim Khemissa; Algeria	05:13.7
1973	Ali Gharbi; Tunisia	04:25.2	Ali Gnawi; Egypt	04:25.8	Adel Youssef; Egypt	04:36.7
1978	Ali Gharbi; Tunisia	04:08.2	Khaled Abu Gabal; Egypt	04:23.1	Habib Soukni; Tunisia	04:24.8
1987	Ibrahim Tamer; Egypt	04:15.1	Samir Bouchlaghem; Tunisia	04:16.1	Fayçal Mbarek; Algeria	04:16.2
1991	Hatem Seif; Egypt	03:59.6	Ibrahim Tamer; Egypt	04:08.5	Mustapha Essanai; Tunisia	04:13.2
1995	Frans Neethling; South Africa	?	Mark Jollands; South Africa	?	Hatem Seif; Egypt	?
1999	Ryno Markgraaff; South Africa	4:06.93	James Willcox; South Africa	4:08.00	Glen Walshaw; Zimbabwe	4:09.65
2003	Oussama Mellouli; Tunisia	4:00.43	Anouar Ben Naceur; Tunisia	4:06.51	Mahrez Mebarek; Algeria	4:07.59
2007	Troyden Prinsloo; South Africa	3:55.29	Ahmed Mathlouthi; Tunisia	3:55.75	Jean Basson; South Africa	3:57.97
2011	Ahmed Mathlouthi; Tunisia	3:54.03	Riaan Schoeman; South Africa	3:58.49	Mark Randall; South Africa	3:59.82
2015	Ahmed Akram; Egypt	3:48.06 GR	Myles Brown; South Africa	3:48.69	Ahmed Mathlouthi; Tunisia	3:51.47
2019	Mohamed Agili; Tunisia	3:48.94	Marwan Elkamash; Egypt	3:50.95	Ahmed Akram; Egypt	3:51.81

=== 800m Freestyle ===
Event	Gold		Silver		Bronze	
2003	Oussama Mellouli; Tunisia	8:12.26	Omar El Gamal; Egypt	8:33.49	Khaled Hanafy; Egypt	8:36.78
2007	Troyden Prinsloo; South Africa	8:02.84	Riaan Schoeman; South Africa	8:11.23	Mohamed Gadallah; Egypt	8:16.10
2011	Ahmed Mathlouthi; Tunisia	8:10.00	Mark Randall; South Africa	8:10.04	Jan Venter; South Africa	8:21.76
2015	Ahmed Akram; Egypt	7:55.36 GR	Marwan El Kamash; Egypt	7:59.54	Myles Brown; South Africa	7:59.57
2019	Ahmed Akram; Egypt	7:57.21	Mohamed Agili; Tunisia	7:57.87	Marwan Elkamash; Egypt	8:06.90

=== 1500m Freestyle ===
Event	Gold		Silver		Bronze	
1978	Ali Gharbi; Tunisia	16:45.8	Samir Bouchlaghem; Tunisia	17:15.3	Habib Soukni; Tunisia	17:30.2
1987	Samir Bouchlaghem; Tunisia	17:18.4	Mohamed Maaroof; Egypt	17:18.4	Fayçal Mbarek; Algeria	17:51.1
1991	Hatem Seif; Egypt	16:00.8	Benoît Fleurot; Mauritius	16:48.9	Mohamed Maaroof; Egypt	16:54.4
1995	Frans Neethling; South Africa	?	Hatem Seif; Egypt	?	Lourens Appelcryn; South Africa	?
1999	Denis Sirringhaus; South Africa	16:17.53	Ryno Markgraaff; South Africa	16:50.96	Herbert Couacud; Mauritius	16:59.31
2003	Oussama Mellouli; Tunisia	15:35.97	Omar El Gamal; Egypt	16:21.49	Khaled Hanafy; Egypt	16:40.61
2007	Troyden Prinsloo; South Africa	15:24.93	Riaan Schoeman; South Africa	15:58.:31	Mohamed Gadallah; Egypt	16:05.20
2011						
2015	Ahmed Akram; Egypt	15:11.68 GR	Ahmed Mathlouthi; Tunisia	15:30.36	Brent Szurdoki; South Africa	15:35.48
2019	Ahmed Akram; Egypt	15:19.49	Mohamed Agili; Tunisia	15:26.15	Marwan El-Amrawy; Egypt	15:32.43

=== 50m Backstroke ===
Event	Gold		Silver		Bronze	
2003	Ahmed Hussein; Egypt	25.89	Simon Thirsk; South Africa	27.04	Haitham Hazem; Egypt	27.30
2007	Gerhard Zandberg; South Africa	25.68	Ahmed Hussein; Egypt	26.13	Jason Dunford; Kenya	26.31
2011	Charl Crous; South Africa	26.06	Jason Dunford; Kenya	26.19	Garth Tune; South Africa	26.74
2015	Mohamed Samy; Egypt	25.71	Richard Ellis; South Africa	25.89	Mohamed Khaled; Egypt	26.16
2019	Mohamed Samy; Egypt	25.26; GR	Abdellah Ardjoune; Algeria	25.61 NR	Driss Lahrichi; Morocco	26.12

=== 100m Backstroke ===
Event	Gold		Silver		Bronze	
1965	Ahmed Abdelbasset; Egypt	01:07.9	Adel Youssef Amine; Egypt	01:08.8	Hamadi Achour; Tunisia	01:11.1
1973	Youssef Ahmed Amine; Egypt	01:02.1	Ali Gharbi; Tunisia	01:05.8	Gharib Attia; Egypt	01:05.6
1978	Ali Gharbi; Tunisia	01:03.4	Sherif Amine; Egypt	01:06.2	Youssef Sahnoune; Algeria	01:06.3
1987	Moustafa Amine; Egypt	01:01.6	Sofiane Benchekour; Algeria		Imed Shafei; Egypt	
1991	Amine Ahmed Amine; Egypt	59.83s	Sofiane Benchekour; Algeria	01:00.8	Brett Halford; Zimbabwe	01:01.8
1995	Barend Nortje; South Africa	?	Gary Albertyn; South Africa	?	Mohamed Madani; Egypt	?
1999	Mehdi Addadi; Algeria	58.28	Benjamin Lo-Pinto; Seychelles	59.64	Haitham Hazem; Egypt	59.91
2003	Ahmed Hussein; Egypt	55.75	Simon Thirsk; South Africa	57.60	Haitham Hazem; Egypt	58.46
2007	Gerhard Zandberg; South Africa	56.53	Jason Dunford; Kenya	57.57	Garth Tune; South Africa	58.54
2011	Charl Crous; South Africa	55.26	Darren Murray; South Africa	55.96	Mohamed Hussein; Egypt	57.63
2015	Richard Ellis; South Africa	55.83	David de Villiers; South Africa	55.84	Mohamed Samy; Egypt	56.31
2019	Abdellah Ardjoune; Algeria	55.02; GR, NR	Mohamed Samy; Egypt	55.57	Martin Binedell; South Africa	56.20

=== 200m Backstroke ===
Event	Gold		Silver		Bronze	
1973	Adel Youssef; Egypt	02:22.4	Christopher Adingupu; Nigeria	02:26.2	Gharib Attia; Egypt	02:26.9
1978	Ali Gharbi; Tunisia	02:20.2	Samir Bouchlaghem; Tunisia	02:21.7	Raouf Nour; Egypt	02:23.2
1987	Sofiane Benchekour; Algeria	02:13.6	Imed Shafei; Egypt	02:16.4	Mohamed Zouaoui; Tunisia	02:18.1
1991	Sofiane Benchekour; Algeria	02:10.4	Mustapha Essanai; Tunisia	02:13.9	Amine Ahmed Amine; Egypt	
1995	Gary Albertyn; South Africa	?	Michael Windisch; South Africa	?	Mohamed Madani; Egypt	?
1999	Brett Rogers; South Africa	2:08.83	George Du Rand; South Africa	2:10.41	Benjamin Lo-Pinto; Seychelles	2:11.21
2003	Ahmed Hussein; Egypt	2:02.46	Jeff Norton; South Africa	2:07.42	Simon Thirsk; South Africa	2:09.79
2007	George Du Rand; South Africa	2:02.69	Ahmed Hussein; Egypt	2:05.03	Taki Mrabet; Tunisia	2:05.35
2011	Darren Murray; South Africa	2:01.74	Charl Crous; South Africa	2:01.88	Taki Mrabet; Tunisia	2:05.19
2015	Martin Binedell; South Africa	2:02.23	Richard Ellis; South Africa	2:02.32	Mohamed Khaled; Egypt	2:04.35
2019	Martin Binedell; South Africa	1:59.03; GR	Abdellah Ardjoune; Algeria	2:00.38 NR	Yassin Elshamaa; Egypt	2:03.17

=== 50m Breaststroke ===
Event	Gold		Silver		Bronze	
2003	Kurt Muller; South Africa	28.75	Sofiane Daid; Algeria	29.10	Malick Fall; Senegal	29.28
2007	Cameron van der Burgh; South Africa	27.74	Thabang Moeketsane; South Africa	28.89	Malick Fall; Senegal	29.26
2011	Cameron van der Burgh; South Africa	27.81	Malick Fall; Senegal	28.33	Nabil Kebbab; Algeria	28.71
2015	Cameron van der Burgh; South Africa	27.18 GR	Youssef El-Kamash; Egypt	28.10	Wassim Elloumi; Tunisia	28.62
2019	Michael Houlie; South Africa	27.41	Youssef El-Kamash; Egypt	27.52 NR	Wassim Elloumi; Tunisia	28.27

=== 100m Breaststroke ===
Event	Gold		Silver		Bronze	
1973	Mohsen Abdelkawi; Egypt	01:13.1	Omar Mouloud; Algeria	01:15.6	Gharib Attia; Egypt	01:15.6
1978	Mohamed Farag; Egypt	01:11.9	Achraf Farah; Egypt	01:12.5	Chedly Wahbi; Tunisia	01:13.3
1987	Ayman Nadim; Egypt	01:11.8	Tarek Khalafallah; Egypt		Abdelhamid Daoud; Algeria	
1991	Abderrazak Bella; Algeria	01:07.6	Paraguay Dija; Nigeria	01:08.1	Bernard Desmarais; Zimbabwe	01:08.3
1995	Herman Louw; South Africa	?	Brett Peterson; South Africa	?	Shemseddine Mahmoud; Egypt	?
1999	Brett Petersen; South Africa	1:02.63	Chris Stewart; South Africa	1:06.01	Alan Ogden; Zimbabwe	1:08.08
2003	Kurt Muller; South Africa	1:02.99	Sofiane Daid; Algeria	1:04.05	Ayman Khattab; Egypt	1:04.10
2007	Cameron van der Burgh; South Africa	1:02.05	Sofiane Daid; Algeria	1:02.11	Thabang Moeketsane; South Africa	1:02.54
2011	Cameron van der Burgh; South Africa	1:02.44	Wassim Elloumi; Tunisia	1:03.17	Nabil Kebbab; Algeria	1:03.80
2015	Cameron van der Burgh; South Africa	1:00.19 GR	Youssef El-Kamash; Egypt	1:02.42	Wassim Elloumi; Tunisia	1:02.79
2019	Alaric Basson; South Africa	1:00.96	Youssef El-Kamash; Egypt	1:01.52	Michael Houlie; South Africa	1:01.55

=== 200m Breaststroke ===
Event	Gold		Silver		Bronze	
1965	Hany Mohamed Nassim; Egypt	02:50.6	Guy Woodhouse; Kenya	03:04.3	Abdelkader Belhoucine; Algeria	03:06.7
1973	Mohsen Abdelkawi; Egypt	02:41.8	Gharib Attia; Egypt	02:46.7	Chaffai Boubguira; Tunisia	02:48.0
1978	Hédi Belhassen; Tunisia	02:39.9	Djamel Yahiouche; Algeria	02:41.8	Mohamed Farag; Egypt	02:43.6
1987	Nebil Ben Aissa; Tunisia	02:31.3	Hakim Chaouachi; Tunisia	02:37.6	Ahmed Digha; Algeria	02:38.5
1991	Jörg Lindemeier; Namibia	02:27.9	Abderrazak Bella; Algeria	02:28.5	Shamsedine Mahmoud; Egypt	02:30.1
1995	Herman Louw; South Africa	?	Adrian Bosch; South Africa	?	Shemseddine Mahmoud; Egypt	?
1999	Terence Parkin; South Africa	2:16.29; GR	Greg Owen; South Africa	2:21.14	Ayman Khattab; Egypt	2:26.98
2003	Neil Versfeld; South Africa	2:16.86	Ayman Khattab; Egypt	2:18.49	Malick Fall; Senegal	2:20.33
2007	Sofiane Daid; Algeria	2:14.27	William Diering; South Africa	2:14.32	Malick Fall; Senegal	2:22.10
2011	Taki Mrabet; Tunisia	2:16.51	Wassim Elloumi; Tunisia	2:18.58	Sofiane Daid; Algeria	2:19.74
2015	Ayrton Sweeney; South Africa	2:14.41	Wassim Elloumi; Tunisia	2:17.80	Youssef El-Kamash; Egypt	2:19.03
2019	Alaric Basson; South Africa	2:14.21; GR	Youssef El-Kamash; Egypt	2:14.83 NR	Adnan Beji; Tunisia	2:15.73

=== 50m Butterfly ===
Event	Gold		Silver		Bronze	
2003	Stephan Ackerman; South Africa	24.79	Haitham Hazem; Egypt	24.84	Kurt Muller; South Africa	25.21
2007	Jason Dunford; Kenya	23.91	Yellow Yeiyah (Nigeria)	24.46	Garth Tune; South Africa	25.02
2011	Jason Dunford; Kenya	23.57 GR	Neil Watson; South Africa	24.31	Garth Tune; South Africa	24.70
2015	Chad le Clos; South Africa	23.51	Omar Eissa; Egypt	24.18	Ahmed Bahgat; Egypt	24.94
2019	Abdelrahman Elaraby; Egypt	23.81	Ali Khalafalla; Egypt	23.88	Ryan Coetzee; South Africa	24.04

=== 100m Butterfly ===
Event	Gold		Silver		Bronze	
1965	Abdelhay Suleiman; Egypt	01:04.3	Jarir Hussein Mansour; Egypt	01:05.3	Anis Bahri; Tunisia	01:13.7
1973	John Ebito; Nigeria	01:01.6	Adel Youssef; Egypt	01:02.5	Noredine Boutaghou; Algeria	01:30.8
1978	John Ebito; Nigeria	58.51s	Ali Gharbi; Tunisia	01:00.4	Bernard Gueye; Ivory Coast	01:00.7
1987	Ahmed Ghanem; Egypt	58.96s	Mohamed Samy; Egypt	01:00.3	Graham Thompson; Zimbabwe	01:00.5
1991	Salah Khalef; Algeria	58.43s	Musa Bakare; Nigeria	58.57s	Pedro Lima; Angola	58.59s
1995	Tamer Zenhum; Egypt	?	Theo Verster; South Africa	?	Salah Khalef; Algeria	?
1999	Ryan Kelly; South Africa	54.66	Theo Verster; South Africa	54.75	Mehdi Addadi; Algeria	56.30
2003	Haitham Hazem; Egypt	54.81	Stephan Ackerman; South Africa	54.95	Ahmed Salah; Egypt	55.25
2007	Jason Dunford; Kenya	53.40	George Du Rand; South Africa	54.97	Ahmed Salah; Egypt	55.85
2011	Jason Dunford; Kenya	52.13	Chad le Clos; South Africa	52.17	Neil Watson; South Africa	55.14
2015	Chad le Clos; South Africa	51.24 GR	Omar Eissa; Egypt	53.54	Nico Meyer; South Africa	55.26
2019	Ryan Coetzee; South Africa	53.70	Alard Basson; South Africa	53.88	Yusuf Tibazi; Morocco	53.89

=== 200m Butterfly ===
Event	Gold		Silver		Bronze	
1973	Noredine Boutaghou; Algeria	02:24.3	Ali Gnawi; Egypt	02:25.1	Medhat Saad; Egypt	02:28.0
1978	Samir Bouchlaghem; Tunisia	02:14.1	Magdy Lashine; Egypt	02:16.6	Ahmed Eid; Egypt	02:18.0
1987	Samir Bouchlaghem; Tunisia	02:09.2	Ahmed Ghanem; Egypt		Imed Bouchlaghem; Tunisia	
1991	Ibrahim Tamer; Egypt	02:07.4	Salah Khalef; Algeria	02:08.2	Mohamed Maaroof; Egypt	02:13.2
1995	Brynn Andrew; South Africa	?	Theo Verster; South Africa	?	Hichem Rochdy; Egypt	?
1999	Theo Verster; South Africa	2:04.69; GR	Raazik Nordien; South Africa	2:08.75	Fares Attar; Algeria	2:10.11
2003	Ahmed Salah; Egypt	2:02.91	Ahmed El Abbadi; Egypt	2:03.99	Anouar Ben Naceur; Tunisia	2:05.15
2007	Jason Dunford; Kenya	2:02.82	Ahmed Salah; Egypt	2:03.35	Ahmed Aboughazala; Egypt	2:05.12
2011	Chad le Clos; South Africa	1:56.37 GR	Jason Dunford; Kenya	2:02.52	Pedro Pinotes; Angola	2:05.47
2015	Ahmed Akram; Egypt	1:58.87 NR	Myles Brown; South Africa	1:59.28	Ahmed Hamdy; Egypt	2:01.54
2019	Jaouad Syoud; Algeria	2:01.01 NR	Lounis Khendriche; Algeria	2:02.49	Ahmed Salem; Egypt	2:03.79

=== 200m I.M. ===
Event	Gold		Silver		Bronze	
1973	Gharib Attia; Egypt	02:20.7	Ali Gharbi; Tunisia	02:23.5	Youssef Ahmed Amine; Egypt	02:24.2
1987	Samir Bouchlaghem; Tunisia	02:16.5	Imed Shafei; Egypt	02:19.0	Ibrahim Tamer; Egypt	02:19.3
1991	Ibrahim Tamer; Egypt	02:12.1	Graham Thompson; Zimbabwe	02:15.3	Yacine Benchekour; Algeria	
1995	Gary Albertyn; South Africa	?	Tamer Zeruhn; Egypt	?	Glen Walshaw; Zimbabwe	?
1999	Theo Verster; South Africa	2:04.10; GR	Terence Parkin; South Africa	2:07.97	Kenny Roberts; Seychelles	2:11.00
2003	Oussama Mellouli; Tunisia	2:06.91	Malick Fall; Senegal	2:09.08	Neil Versfeld; South Africa	2:09.91
2007	Ahmed Mathlouthi; Tunisia	2:05.21	Riaan Schoeman; South Africa	2:05.23	Darian Townsend; South Africa	2:06.10
2011	Chad le Clos; South Africa	2:00.70 GR	Darian Townsend; South Africa	2:01.76	Taki Mrabet; Tunisia	2:03.46
2015	Myles Brown; South Africa	2:01.71	Mohamed Khaled; Egypt	2:02.38	Ayrton Sweeney; South Africa	2:04.22
2019	Jaouad Syoud; Algeria	2:02.49	Yassin Elshamaa; Egypt	2:03.98	Neil Fair; South Africa	2:04.15

=== 400m I.M ===
Event	Gold		Silver		Bronze	
1978	Samir Bouchlaghem; Tunisia	05:01.5	Sharif Amine; Egypt	05:08.7	Youssef Sahnoune; Algeria	05:13.4
1987	Samir Bouchlaghem; Tunisia	04:54.6	Ibrahim Tamer; Egypt	04:59.8	Imed Shafei; Egypt	05:04.5
1991	Ibrahim Tamer; Egypt	04:49.9	Yacine Benchekour; Algeria	04:51.8	Benoît Fleurot; Mauritius	
1995	Michael Windisch; South Africa	?	Wade Ferguson; South Africa	?	Chris Shaw; Zimbabwe	?
1999	Terence Parkin; South Africa	4:35.29	Adrian Bosch; South Africa	4:39.06	Kenny Roberts; Seychelles	4:46.26
2003	Oussama Mellouli; Tunisia	4:29.68	Neil Versfeld; South Africa	4:39.37	Omar El Gamal; Egypt	4:46.08
2007	Riaan Schoeman; South Africa	4:21.91	Ahmed Mathlouthi; Tunisia	4.27.00	Taki Mrabet; Tunisia	4.28.83
2011	Chad le Clos; South Africa	4:16.88 GR	Taki Mrabet; Tunisia	4:21.11	Riaan Schoeman; South Africa	4:25.32
2015	Ayrton Sweeney; South Africa	4:21.83	Pedro Pinotes; Angola	4:23.12	Ahmed Hamdy; Egypt	4:23.87
2019	Ramzi Chouchar; Algeria	4:23.53 NR	Ayrton Sweeney; South Africa	4:26.88	Ahmed Salem; Egypt	4:28.35

=== 4 × 100 m Free Relay ===
Event	Gold		Silver		Bronze	
1973	Egypt	03:48.7	Algeria	03:57.9	Nigeria	04:04.3
1987	Egypt	03:39.3	Algeria	03:40.8	Tunisia	03:44.0
1991	Egypt	03:34.9	Algeria	03:35.3	Nigeria	03:39.6
1995	South Africa	?	Algeria	?	Egypt	?
1999	South Africa; Brett Rogers, Brett Petersen, Ryan Kelly, Brendon Dedekind	3:51.45	Algeria	3:54.91	Egypt	3:58.22
2003	Algeria	3:27.05	South Africa	3:29.63	Egypt	3:55.25
2007	South Africa	3:22.52	Algeria	3:24.36	Egypt	3:29.76
2011	South Africa; Leith Shankland; Chad le Clos; Gideon Louw; Darian Townsend	3:19.42 GR	Algeria; Nabil Kebbab; Oussama Sahnoune; Jughurtha Boumalie; Ryad Djendouci	3:26.51	Kenya; Jason Dunford; David Dunford; Rama Vyombo; Kiptolo Boit	3:29.84
2015	South Africa; Douglas Erasmus (50.29); Clayton Jimmie (49.67); Calvyn Justus (50.05); Caydon Muller (49.68)	3:19.69	Egypt; Omar Eissa (50.61); Mohamed Khaled (49.98); Marwan El Kamash (50.27); Mohamed Samy (49.36)	3:20.22	Algeria; Badis Djendouci (52.26); Nazim Belkhodja (50.60); Riyad Djendouci (52.28); Lies Abdelghani Nefsi (51.02)	3:26.16
2019	South Africa (RSA); Brad Tandy (51.05); Ryan Coetzee (50.61); Martin Binedell (50.12); Douglas Erasmus (49.85)	3:21.63	Egypt (EGY); Abdelrahman Elaraby (51.57); Marwan Elkamash (51.59); Ali Khalafalla (49.27); Mohamed Samy (49.40)	3:21.83	Morocco (MAR); Souhail Hamouchane (52.11); Driss Lahrichi (51.44); Merwane El Merini (52.04); Samy Boutouil (50.33)	3:25.92 NR

=== 4 × 200 m Free Relay ===
Event	Gold		Silver		Bronze	
1965	Egypt; Hany Mohamed Nassim, Ahmed Sayed Zine, Marwan Elghizaoui, Ahmed Mahmoud Rezk	09:04.4	(Algeria) Algeria; Kamel Boughida, Sayed Salalet, Hakim Khemissa, Mohamed Ladjali	09:47.2	(Tunisia) Tunisia; Tijani Meddeb, Said Karâa, Jacques Younes, Badreddine Berrabah	09:54.5
1973	Egypt	08:30.7	Algeria	08:40.6	Nigeria	09:30.5
1978	Tunisia	08:25.2	Egypt	08:32.5	Algeria	08:36.8
1987	Egypt	08:08.5	Tunisia	08:16.2	Algeria	08:19.4
1991	Egypt	07:51.1	Algeria	08:00.9	Zimbabwe	08:10.8
1995	South Africa	?	Egypt	?	Algeria	?
1999	South Africa; Herman Louw, James Willcox, Ryno Maarkgraaf, Terence Parkin	7:41.91	Algeria	7:58.54	Seychelles; Kenny Roberts, Jean-Paul Adam, Benjamin Lo-Pinto, Barnsley Albert	8:04.98
2003	South Africa	7:42.45	Algeria	7:45.22	Egypt	7:50.91
2007	South Africa	7.31.70	Algeria	7.32.50; NR	Tunisia	7.43.53
2011	South Africa; Jan Venter; Riaan Schoeman; Leith Shankland; Darian Townsend	7:33.63	Algeria; Badis Djendouci; Ryad Djendouci; Abdelghani Nefsi; Youghorta Haddad	7:49.59	Kenya; David Dunford; Amar Shah; Kiptolo Boit; Jason Dunford	8:01.07
2015	South Africa; Brent Szurdoki (1:51.94); Calvyn Justus (1:50.68); Myles Brown (1:48.05); Chad le Clos (1:47.95)	7:18.62 GR	Egypt; Marwan El Amrawy (1:51.60); Mohamed Samy (1:50.63); Ahmed Akram (1:48.61); Marwan El Kamash (1:49.81)	7:20.65	Tunisia; Mohamed Mehdi Laagili (1:51.01); Mohamed Ali Chaouachi (1:53.81); Wassim Elloumi (2:01.37); Ahmed Mathlouthi (1:58.87)	7:45.06
2019	Egypt (EGY); Marwan El-Amrawy (1:50.98); Ahmed Akram (1:50.98); Marwan Elkamash (1:53.02); Yassin Elshamaa (1:50.43)	7:25.41	South Africa (RSA); Martin Binedell (1:51.87); Brent Szurdoki (1:50.79); Alard Basson (1:56.70); Alaric Basson (1:55.77)	7:35.13	Algeria (ALG); Mohamed Anisse Djaballah (1:53.54); Lounis Khendriche (1:54.87); Ramzi Chouchar (1:55.28); Moncef Aymen Balamane (1:57.80)	7:41.49

=== 4 × 100 m Medley Relay ===
Event	Gold		Silver		Bronze	
1965	Egypt	04:26.7	Tunisia	04:52.8	Algeria	
1973	Egypt	04:17.3	Nigeria	04:25.0	Algeria	04:28.2
1978	Tunisia	04:13.2	Algeria	04:16.8	Nigeria	04:17.3
1987	Egypt	04:05.7	Algeria	04:08.5	Tunisia	04:11.2
1991	Egypt	04:01.2	Nigeria	04:05.8	Zimbabwe	04:09.2
1995	South Africa	?	Egypt	?	Algeria	?
1999	South Africa	3:51.45	Algeria	3:54.91	Egypt	3:58.22
2003	Egypt	3:46.67	South Africa	3:47.92	Algeria	3:55.25
2007	South Africa	3:44.92	Algeria	3:47.31	Egypt	3:49.60
2011	South Africa; Charl Crous; Darian Townsend; Chad le Clos; Gideon Louw	3:46.74	Algeria; Badis Djendouci; Sofiane Daid; Oussama Sahnoune; Nabil Kebbab	3:51.09	Kenya; David Dunford; Amar Shah; Jason Dunford; Rama Vyombo	3:53.55
2015 medley relay	Egypt; Mohamed Khaled (56.85); Youssef El-Kamash (1:02.10); Omar Eissa (54.16); Mohamed Samy (49.33)	3:42.44	South Africa; Richard Ellis (55.90); Ayrton Sweeney (1:03.39); Nico Meyer (54.37); Clayton Jimmie (49.19)	3:42.85	Tunisia; Ahmed Mathlouthi (58.10); Wassim Elloumi (1:02.93); Mohamed Mehdi Laagili (59.16); Mohamed Ali Chaoachi (51.81)	3:52.00
2019	South Africa (RSA); Martin Binedell (56.46); Alaric Basson (1:00.70); Ryan Coetzee (53.18); Douglas Erasmus (49.90)	3:40.24; GR	Egypt (EGY); Mohamed Samy (56.84); Youssef El-Kamash (1:01.17); Khaled Morad (55.17); Ali Khalafalla (48.92)	3:42.10	Algeria (ALG); Abdellah Ardjoune (56.30); Moncef Aymen Balamane (1:02.38); Jaouad Syoud (54.01); Mehdi Nazim Benbara (50.78)	3:43.47 NR
