= South Africa at the 2000 Summer Olympics =

- IOC code: RSA
- NOC: South African Sports Confederation and Olympic Committee
- Website: www.sascoc.co.za

in Sydney
- Competitors: 127 (89 men and 38 women) in 17 sports
- Flag bearer: Hezekiél Sepeng
- Medals Ranked 55th: Gold 0 Silver 2 Bronze 3 Total 5

Summer Olympics appearances (overview)
- 1904; 1908; 1912; 1920; 1924; 1928; 1932; 1936; 1948; 1952; 1956; 1960; 1964–1988; 1992; 1996; 2000; 2004; 2008; 2012; 2016; 2020; 2024; 2028

South Africa competed at the 2000 Summer Olympics in Sydney, Australia.

The South African Airways had one of their Boeing 747-300s specially painted in rainbow colours to transport the South African Olympic team to Sydney. The aircraft was fondly dubbed the Ndizani.

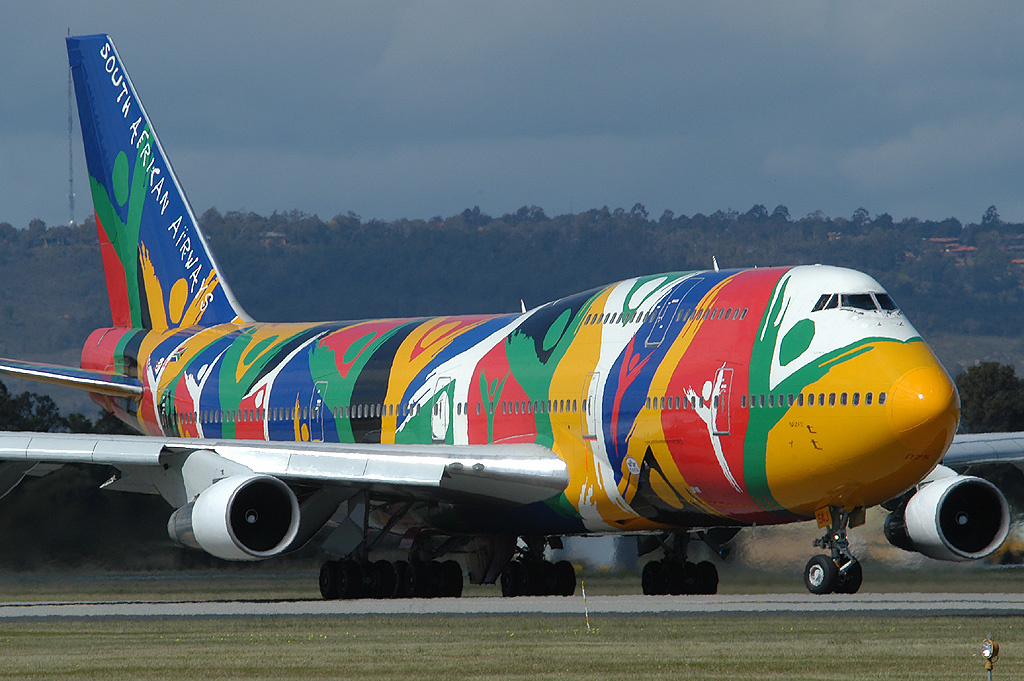
The SAA Boeing 747-300 Ndizani that had flown the athletes to Sydney.

== Medalists ==
Medal	Name	Sport	Event	Date
Silver	Terence Parkin	Swimming	Men's 200 metre breaststroke	20 September
Silver	Hestrie Cloete	Athletics	Women's high jump	30 September
Bronze	Penelope Heyns	Swimming	Women's 100 metre breaststroke	19 September
Bronze	Frantz Kruger	Athletics	Men's discus throw	25 September
Bronze	Llewellyn Herbert	Athletics	Men's 400 metres hurdles	27 September

== Competitors ==
The following is the list of number of competitors in the Games.

Sport	Men	Women	Total
Archery	0	2	2
Athletics	18	5	23
Baseball	24	–	24
Boxing	3	–	3
Canoeing	1	1	2
Cycling	3	1	4
Field hockey	0	16	16
Football	16	0	16
Judo	0	1	1
Modern pentathlon	0	1	1
Rowing	6	2	8
Sailing	2	0	2
Shooting	3	0	3
Swimming	8	6	14
Tennis	3	2	5
Triathlon	1	1	2
Wrestling	1	–	1
Total	89	38	127

== Archery ==
South Africa returned two of the archers that had competed four years earlier. Again, Lewis had the nation's only victory.

Women

Athlete	Event	Ranking round		Round of 32	Round of 16	Quarterfinals	Semifinals	Final	
Athlete	Event	Score	Seed	Score	Score	Score	Score	Score	Rank
Jill Borresen	Individual	635	18	Michelle Tremelling (AUS); L 147-162	Did not advance				
Kirstin Lewis	Individual	615	48	Natalia Nasaridze (TUR); W 154-153	Cristina Ioriatti (ITA); L 154-145	Did not advance			

== Athletics ==
Men
Track & road events

Athlete	Event	Heat		Quarterfinal		Semifinal		Final	
Athlete	Event	Result	Rank	Result	Rank	Result	Rank	Result	Rank
Johan Botha	800 m	01:46.91	13 q	—N/a		01:45.49	11	Did not advance	
Werner Botha	800 m	01:47.83	22 Q	—N/a		01:46.53	16	Did not advance	
Shaun Bownes	100 m hurdles	13.53	5 Q	13.54	7 Q	13.41	9	Did not advance	
Llewellyn Herbert	400 m hurdles	49.25	3 Q	—N/a		48.38	2 Q	47.81	Bronze medal
Arnaud Malherbe	400 m	45.73	21 q	45.59	21	Did not advance			
Johannes Maremane	Marathon	—N/a						2:21:25	43
Hendrick Mokganyetsi	400 m	45.22	2 Q	45.15	5 Q	45.52	8 Q	45.52	6
Alwyn Myburgh	400 m hurdles	49.57	10 q	—N/a		49.25	13	Did not advance	
Hendrick Ramaala	Marathon	—N/a						2:16:19	12
Hezekiél Sepeng	800 m	01:47.46	19 Q	—N/a		01:44.85	8 q	01:45.29	4
Josia Thugwane	Marathon	—N/a						2:16:59	20
Mathew Quinn	100 m	10.44	37 Q	10.27	17	Did not advance			
Werner Botha; Llewellyn Herbert; Arnaud Malherbe; Hendrick Mokganyetsi; Alwyn Myburgh; Hezekiél Sepeng	4 × 400 m relay	03:04.08	2 Q	—N/a		03:01.25	6	Did not advance	

Field events

Athlete	Event	Qualification		Final	
Athlete	Event	Distance	Position	Distance	Position
Okkert Brits	Pole vault	5.65	7 q	5.80	7
Frantz Kruger	Discus Throw	67.54	2 Q	68.19	Bronze medal
Burger Lambrechts	Shot put	19.75	14	Did not advance	
Frits Potgieter	Discus Throw	61.56	18	Did not advance	
Karel Potgieter	Shot put	19.02	22	Did not advance	
Janus Robberts	Shot put	19.79	12 q	20.32	7

Women
Track & road events

Athlete	Event	Heat		Quarterfinal		Semifinal		Final	
Athlete	Event	Result	Rank	Result	Rank	Result	Rank	Result	Rank
Elana Meyer	10,000 m	32:35.32	7 Q	—N/a				31:14.70	8
Colleen De Reuck	Marathon	—N/a						2:36:48	31
Heide Seyerling	400 m	51.92	16 Q	50.87	7 Q	51.06	7 Q	50.05	6

Field events

Athlete	Event	Qualification		Final	
Athlete	Event	Distance	Position	Distance	Position
Hestrie Cloete	High Jump	1.94	1 Q	2.01	Silver medal
Elmarie Gerryts	Pole vault	4.30	7 q	NM	

== Baseball ==
South Africa's first appearance in the Olympic baseball tournament resulted in a last-place finish. The baseball team finished the preliminary round with a 1–6 record, having lost by 10 runs or more four times. The only team that South Africa defeated was the Netherlands.

Men

=== Preliminary round ===
Pos	Team	Pld	W	L	RF	RA	RD	PCT	GB	Qualification
1	Cuba	7	6	1	50	17	+33	.857 (Note: Cuba defeated the United States 6–1.)	—	Advance to knockout round
2	United States	7	6	1	42	14	+28	.857	—	Advance to knockout round
3	South Korea	7	4	3	40	26	+14	.571 (Note: South Korea defeated Japan 7–6.)	2	Advance to knockout round
4	Japan	7	4	3	41	23	+18	.571	2	Advance to knockout round
5	Netherlands	7	3	4	19	29	−10	.429	3	
6	Italy	7	2	5	33	43	−10	.286 (Note: Italy defeated Australia 8–7.)	4	
7	Australia (H)	7	2	5	30	41	−11	.286	4	
8	South Africa	7	1	6	11	73	−62	.143	5	

(H) Hosts
Notes:

17 September	Cuba	16–0 (F/7)	South Africa	Blacktown Olympic Park; Attendance: 3,082
17 September		Boxscore		Blacktown Olympic Park; Attendance: 3,082

18 September	United States	11–1 (F/7)	South Africa	Blacktown Olympic Park; Attendance: 3,474
18 September		Boxscore		Blacktown Olympic Park; Attendance: 3,474

19 September	South Africa	0–13 (F/7)	Italy	Blacktown Olympic Park; Attendance: 2,511
19 September		Boxscore		Blacktown Olympic Park; Attendance: 2,511

20 September	South Africa	4–10	Australia	Blacktown Olympic Park; Attendance: 3,459
20 September		Boxscore		Blacktown Olympic Park; Attendance: 3,459

22 September	South Africa	0–8	Japan	Blacktown Olympic Park; Attendance: 3,512
22 September		Boxscore		Blacktown Olympic Park; Attendance: 3,512

23 September	Netherlands	2–3 (F/10)	South Africa	Blacktown Olympic Park; Attendance: 3,484
23 September		Boxscore		Blacktown Olympic Park; Attendance: 3,484

24 September	South Korea	13–3 (F/8)	South Africa	Sydney Baseball Stadium; Attendance: 13,864
24 September		Boxscore		Sydney Baseball Stadium; Attendance: 13,864

Team Roster

- Neil Adonis
- Clint Alfino
- Francisco Alfino
- Paul Bell
- Vaughn Berriman
- Jason Cook

- Errol Davis
- Simon de la Rey
- Nick Dempsey
- Ashley Dove
- Darryl Gonsalves
- Brian Harrell

- Tim Harrell
- Richard Harrell
- Ian Holness
- Kevin Johnson
- Willem Kemp
- More MacKay

- Liall Mauritz
- Glen Morris
- Alan Phillips
- Darryn Smith
- Russell van Niekerk

== Boxing ==
Men

Athlete	Event	Round of 32	Round of 16	Quarterfinals	Semifinals	Final	
Athlete	Event	Opposition Result	Opposition Result	Opposition Result	Opposition Result	Opposition Result	Rank
Phumzile Matyhila	Flyweight	—N/a	Suleiman Bilali (KEN); L RSC	Did not advance			
Jeffrey Mathebula	Featherweight	Nouzeddine Medjehoud (ALG); W 10-5	Bekzat Sattarkhanov (KAZ); L 5-16	Did not advance			
Danie Venter	Light heavyweight	Ihab Al-Youssef (SYR); W 12-9	Gurcharan Singh (IND); L RSC	Did not advance			

== Canoeing ==
=== Sprint ===
Men

Athlete	Event	Heats		Semifinals		Final	
Athlete	Event	Time	Rank	Time	Rank	Time	Rank
Alan van Coller	K-1 500 m	01:41.805	5 Q	1:40.656	3 Q	02:04.981	8
Alan van Coller	K-1 1000 m	03:39.573	4 Q	03:41.727	4	Did not advance	

Women

Athlete	Event	Heats		Semifinals		Final	
Athlete	Event	Time	Rank	Time	Rank	Time	Rank
Ruth Nortje	K-1 500 m	01:51.047	3 Q	BYE		02:20.274	7

== Cycling ==
=== Road Cycling ===
Athlete	Event	Time	Rank
David George	Men's road race	5:45:51	86
Robert Owen Hunter	Men's road race	DNF	

=== Track ===
Athlete	Event	Time	Rank
Garen Bloch	Men's 1000m time trial	01:04.478	8

=== Mountain biking ===
Athlete	Event	Time	Rank
Erica Lynn Green	Women's cross-country	2:03:32.37	25

== Football ==
=== Men's team competition ===
Team Roster

- Emile Baron
- Fabian McCarthy
- David Kannemeyer
- Nkhiphitheni Matombo
- Matthew Booth
- Quinton Fortune
- Stanton Fredericks
- Daniel Matsau
- Toni Nhleko
- Steve Lekoelea
- Jabu Pule
- Dumisa Ngobe
- Abram Nteo
- Aaron Mokoena
- Siyabonga Nomvethe
- Delron Buckley
- Benni McCarthy
- Brian Baloyi
- Lebohang Kukane
- Mzunani Mgwigwi
- Patrick Mbuthu
- Rowen Fernandez

Group D

Team	Pld	W	D	L	GF	GA	GD	Pts
Brazil	3	2	0	1	5	4	+1	6
Japan	3	2	0	1	4	3	+1	6
South Africa	3	1	0	2	5	5	0	3
Slovakia	3	1	0	2	4	6	−2	3

14 September 2000
20:00

South Africa	1–2	Japan
Nomvethe 31'	Report	Takahara 45+1', 79'

Bruce Stadium, Canberra
Attendance: 17,500
Referee: Stéphane Bré (France)

17 September 2000
19:00

Brazil	1–3	South Africa
Edu 11'	Report	Fortune 10'; Nomvethe 74'; Lekoelea 90'

Brisbane Cricket Ground, Brisbane
Attendance: 36,326
Referee: Bruce Grimshaw (New Zealand)

20 September 2000
20:00

Slovakia	2–1	South Africa
Czinege 64'; Šlahor 72'	Report	McCarthy 75'

Bruce Stadium, Canberra
Attendance: 14,562
Referee: Mario Sánchez Yantén (Chile)

== Hockey ==
=== Pool D ===
Team	Pld	W	D	L	GF	GA	Pts
New Zealand	4	2	1	1	7	5	7
China	4	2	0	2	4	5	6
Netherlands	4	1	2	1	9	9	5
Germany	4	1	2	1	6	6	5
South Africa	4	1	1	2	4	5	1

Advanced to medal round

17 September 2000
20:30

Germany	2–1	South Africa
Rinne 28'; Becker 50'	Report	Agliotti 7'

Umpires:
Lee Mi-Ok (KOR)
Kazuko Yasueda (JPN)

19 September 2000
13:30

Netherlands	2–2	South Africa
Boomgaardt 12'; Smabers 16'	Report	Coetzee 52'; Dare 61'

Umpires:
Kazuko Yasueda (JPN)
Gill Clarke (GBR)

21 September 2000
18:30

New Zealand	1–0	South Africa
Smith 54'	Report

Umpires:
Judith Barnesby (AUS)
Lee Mi-Ok (KOR)

22 September 2000
18:30

China	0–1	South Africa
	Report	Geyser 52'

Umpires:
Angela Lario (ESP)
Gill Clarke (GBR)

=== Crossover ===
25 September 2000
10:30

Great Britain	3–2	South Africa
Simpson 3'; Clewlow 12'; Smith 38'	Report	Dare 6'; Coetzee 31'

Umpires:
Renee Chatas (USA)
Angela Lario (ESP)

=== Ninth and tenth place ===
27 September 2000
08:30

South Africa	0–3	South Korea
	Report	Kim Eun-Jin 23', 26'; Yoo Hee-Joo 35+'

Umpires:
Michele Arnold (AUS)
Renee Cohen (NED)

Team Roster

'

- Marilyn Agliotti
- Kerry Bee
- Caryn Bentley
- Lindsey Carlisle

- Pietie Coetzee
- Alison Dare
- Jacqueline Geyser
- Anli Kotze

- Michele MacNaughton
- Luntu Ntloko
- Karen Roberts
- Karen Symons

- Inke van Wyk
- Carina van Zyl
- Paola Vidulich
- Susan Wessels

== Judo ==
Women

Athlete	Event	Round of 32	Round of 16	Quarterfinals	Semifinals	Repechage 1	Repechage 2	Repechage 3	Final / BM	
Athlete	Event	Opposition Result	Opposition Result	Opposition Result	Opposition Result	Opposition Result	Opposition Result	Opposition Result	Opposition Result	Rank
Tania Tallie	−48 kg	Zhao (CHN); L	Did not advance							

== Modern pentathlon ==
One female pentathlete represented South Africa in 2000.

Women

Athlete	Event	Shooting (10 m air pistol)	Fencing (épée one touch)	Swimming (200 m freestyle)	Riding (show jumping)	Running (3000 m)	Total points	Final rank
Athlete	Event	Points	Points	Points	Points	Points	Total points	Final rank
Karina Gerber	Women's	928	720	1109	1040	820	4617	18

== Rowing ==
Athlete	Event	Heats		Repechage		Semifinals		Final	
Athlete	Event	Time	Rank	Time	Rank	Time	Rank	Time	Rank
Ramon di Clemente; Donovan Cech	Men's coxless pair	6:43.23	2 SA/B	—N/a		6:33.15	3 FA	6:43.10	6
Mark Rowand; Ross Hawkins; Roger Tobler; Mike Hasselbach	Men's lightweight coxless four	6:17.88	3 'SA/B	—N/a		6:02.09	3 FA	6:07.67	5
Helen Fleming; Colleen Orsmond	Women's coxless pair	7:17.83	1 FA	—N/a				7:16.84	5

Qualification Legend: FA=Final A (medal); FB=Final B (non-medal); FC=Final C (non-medal); FD=Final D (non-medal); FE=Final E (non-medal); FF=Final F (non-medal); SA/B=Semifinals A/B; SC/D=Semifinals C/D; SE/F=Semifinals E/F; R=Repechage

== Sailing ==
Men

Athlete	Event	Race											Net points	Final rank
Athlete	Event	1	2	3	4	5	6	7	8	9	10	M	Net points	Final rank
Ian Richard Ainslie	Finn	7	17	17	~~19~~	~~22~~	15	7	7	12	9	11	99	14

Open

Athlete	Event	Race											Net points	Final rank
Athlete	Event	1	2	3	4	5	6	7	8	9	10	M	Net points	Final rank
Gareth Blanckenberg	Laser	~~24~~	10	~~32~~	6	1	11	4	21	19	12	8	92	9

== Shooting ==
Men

Athlete	Event	Qualification		Final	
Athlete	Event	Points	Rank	Total	Rank
Corne Basson	50m rifle three positions	1125	44	Did not advance	
Corne Basson	50m rifle prone	583	47	Did not advance	
Jaco Henn	50m rifle three positions	1145	36	Did not advance	
Jaco Henn	50m rifle prone	585	44	Did not advance	
Frans Swart	Trap	109	23	Did not advance	

== Swimming ==
Men

Athlete	Event	Heat		Semi final		Final	
Athlete	Event	Time	Rank	Time	Rank	Time	Rank
Brendon Dedekind	50 m freestyle	22.46	8 Q	22.39	9	Did not advance	
Ryk Neethling	200 m freestyle	DNS		Did not advance			
Ryk Neethling	400 m freestyle	03:48.08	3 Q	—N/a		03:48.52	8
Ryk Neethling	1500 m freestyle	15:09.12	4 Q	—N/a		15:00.48	5
Terence Parkin	100 m breaststroke	01:03.20	28	Did not advance			
Terence Parkin	200 m breaststroke	02:15.06	10 Q	02:13.57	6 Q	02:12.50	Silver medal
Terence Parkin	200 m individual medley	02:03.33	17	Did not advance			
Terence Parkin	400 m individual medley	04:18.14	Q	—N/a		04:16.92	5
Brett Petersen	100 m breaststroke	01:02.20	11 Q	01:01.42	5 Q	01:01.63	7
Roland Schoeman	50 m freestyle	22.53	10 Q	22.41	10	Did not advance	
Roland Schoeman	100 m freestyle	49.74	10 Q	49.84	15	Did not advance	
Simon Thirsk	100 m backstroke	57.06	30	Did not advance			
Simon Thirsk	200 m backstroke	DNS		Did not advance			
Theo Verster	100 m butterfly	53.95	18	Did not advance			
Theo Verster	200 m butterfly	02:00.90	26	Did not advance			
Theo Verster	200 m individual medley	02:03.64	20	Did not advance			
Roland Schoeman; Brendon Dedekind; Nicholas Folker; Terence Parkin	4 × 100 m freestyle relay	03:21.28	11	Did not advance			
Simon Thirsk; Brett Petersen; Theo Verster; Nicholas Folker	4 × 100 m medley relay	03:42.44	13	Did not advance			

Women

Athlete	Event	Heat		Final B		Final	
Athlete	Event	Time	Rank	Time	Rank	Time	Rank
Penny Heyns	100 m breaststroke	01:07.85	2 Q	01:08.33	5 Q	01:07.55	Bronze medal
Penny Heyns	200 m breaststroke	02:30.17	20	Did not advance			
Mandy Loots	100 m butterfly	59.94	16 Q	59.63	12	Did not advance	
Mandy Loots	200 m butterfly	02:11.38	14 Q	02:10.58	12	Did not advance	
Heleen Muller	50 m freestyle	26.07	25	Did not advance			
Heleen Muller	100 m freestyle	55.45	5 Q	55.24	3 Q	55.19	6
Heleen Muller	200 m freestyle	01:59.89	2 Q	02:00.04	9	Did not advance	
Renate du Plessis	100 m butterfly	01:01.32	28	Did not advance			
Sarah Poewe	100 m breaststroke	01:08.06	4 Q	01:07.48	1 Q	01:07.85	4
Sarah Poewe	200 m breaststroke	02:27.84	9 Q	02:25.54	5 Q	02:25.72	6
Charlene Wittstock	100 m backstroke	01:03.18	17	Did not advance			
Charlene Wittstock	200 m backstroke	2:15.10	16 Q	2:14.95	14	Did not advance	
Mandy Loots; Heleen Muller; Sarah Poewe; Charlene Wittstock	4 × 100 m medley relay	04:07.19	5 Q	—N/a		04:05.15	5

== Taekwondo ==
South Africa has qualified a single taekwondo jin.

Athlete	Event	Round of 16	Quarterfinals	Semifinals	Repechage 1	Repechage 2	Final / BM	
Athlete	Event	Opposition Result	Opposition Result	Opposition Result	Opposition Result	Opposition Result	Opposition Result	Rank
Donald Ravenscroft	Men's +80 kg	Nikolaidis (GRE); L WO	Did not advance					

== Tennis ==
Men

Athlete	Event	Round of 64	Round of 32	Round of 16	Quarterfinals	Semifinals	Final / BM	
Athlete	Event	Opposition Score	Opposition Score	Opposition Score	Opposition Score	Opposition Score	Opposition Score	Rank
Wayne Ferreira	Singles	Haas (GER); L 2–6, 5–7	Did not advance					=33
David Adams; John-Laffnie de Jager	Doubles	—N/a	Abaroa / Hernández (MEX); W 6–4, 7–6^{(7–5)}	Kafelnikov / Safin (RUS); W 6–3, 3–6, 9–7	Knowles / Merklein (BAH); W 4–6, 6–2, 14–12	Lareau / Nestor (CAN); L 1–6, 2–6	Corretja / Costa (ESP); L 6–2, 4–6, 3–6	4

Women

Athlete	Event	Round of 64	Round of 32	Round of 16	Quarterfinals	Semifinals	Final / BM	
Athlete	Event	Opposition Score	Opposition Score	Opposition Score	Opposition Score	Opposition Score	Opposition Score	Rank
Amanda Coetzer	Singles	Kis (HUN); W 6–1, 6–1	Kremer (LUX); W 4–6, 6–3, 6–4	Appelmans (BEL); W 6–3, 6–1	Dokic (AUS); L 1–6, 6–1, 1–6	Did not advance		=5
Amanda Coetzer; Liezel Horn	Doubles	—N/a	Mandula / Marosi-Aracama (HUN); L 4–6, 3–6	Did not advance				=17

== Triathlon ==
Athlete	Event	Swim (1.5 km)	Trans 1	Bike (40 km)	Trans 2	Run (10 km)	Total Time	Rank
Conrad Stoltz	Men's	18:47.39	41	57:38.60	1	33:58.40	1:50:24.39	20
Lizel Moore	Women's	21:01.48	41	1:08:32.90	28	38:43.81	2:08:18.19	30

== Wrestling ==
Freestyle

Athlete	Event	Elimination Pool				Quarterfinal	Semifinal	Final / BM	
Athlete	Event	Opposition Result	Opposition Result	Opposition Result	Rank	Opposition Result	Opposition Result	Opposition Result	Rank
Jannie du Toit	−76 kg	Khinchagov (UZB); L 1–11	Allahverdiyev (AZE); L 5–8	—N/a	3	Did not advance			14
