= Swimming at the African Games =

- Swimming
- Frequency: Every four years
- Inaugurated: 1965 (Republic of the Congo) Brazzaville
- Most recent: 2023 (Ghana) Accra
- Best: South Africa (RSA)

Swimming has been part of African Games since its inaugural edition in 1965 and has continued to feature prominently at the competition in each of its subsequent editions.

== Editions ==
Games	Year	Host city	Countries	Swimmers			Events			Best nation
Games	Year	Host city	Countries	Men	Women	Total	Men	Women	Mixed	Best nation
1	1965	(Republic of the Congo) Brazzaville			—N/a		8	—N/a	—N/a	United Arab Republic
2	1973	(Nigeria) Lagos					13	9	—N/a	Egypt
3	1978	(Algeria) Algiers					13	13	—N/a	Tunisia
4	1987	(Kenya) Nairobi					16	16	—N/a	Tunisia
5	1991	(Egypt) Cairo					16	16	—N/a	Egypt
6	1995	(Zimbabwe) Harare					16	16	—N/a	South Africa
7	1999	(South Africa) Johannesburg	18			128	16	16	—N/a	South Africa
8	2003	(Nigeria) Abuja	21	63	54	117	20	20	—N/a	South Africa
9	2007	(Algeria) Algiers	19			121	20	20	—N/a	South Africa
10	2011	(Mozambique) Maputo	25				20	20	—N/a	South Africa
11	2015	(Republic of the Congo) Brazzaville					20	20	2	South Africa
12	2019	(Morocco) Rabat	37				20	20	2	South Africa
13	2023	(Ghana) Accra					20	20	2	South Africa

== Medal table ==
As of 2023:

Rank	Nation	Gold	Silver	Bronze	Total
1	South Africa (RSA)	201	135	104	440
2	Egypt (EGY)	108	115	104	327
3	Tunisia (TUN)	52	37	48	137
4	Algeria (ALG)	36	58	74	168
5	Zimbabwe (ZIM)	21	28	31	80
6	Kenya (KEN)	6	7	8	21
7	Nigeria (NGR)	4	12	15	31
8	Mauritius (MRI)	3	4	3	10
9	Seychelles (SEY)	2	4	9	15
10	Namibia (NAM)	2	3	12	17
11	Madagascar (MAD)	1	4	8	13
12	Angola (ANG)	1	1	6	8
13	Senegal (SEN)	0	2	9	11
14	Botswana (BOT)	0	2	3	5
15	Ghana (GHA)	0	1	3	4
16	Ivory Coast (CIV)	0	1	1	2
17	Mozambique (MOZ)	0	1	0	1
18	Zambia (ZAM)	0	0	9	9
19	Morocco (MAR)	0	0	5	5
20	Uganda (UGA)	0	0	1	1
Totals (20 entries)		437	415	453	1,305

== Games records ==
All records were set in finals unless noted otherwise. All times are swum in a long-course (50m) pool.

=== Men ===
Event	Time	Name	Nationality	Date	Meet	Location	Ref
50m freestyle	22.02	Ali Khalafalla	Egypt	13 March 2024	2023 African Games	Accra, Ghana	
100m freestyle	48.97	Oussama Sahnoune	Algeria	21 August 2019	2019 African Games	Casablanca, Morocco	
200m freestyle	1:47.77	Devon Brown	South Africa	6 September 2015	2015 African Games	Brazzaville, Congo	
400m freestyle	3:48.06	Ahmed Akram	Egypt	9 September 2015	2015 African Games	Brazzaville, Congo	
800m freestyle	7:55.36	Ahmed Akram	Egypt	7 September 2015	2015 African Games	Brazzaville, Congo	
1500m freestyle	15:11.68	Ahmed Akram	Egypt	10 September 2015	2015 African Games	Brazzaville, Congo	
50m backstroke	25.26	Mohamed Samy	Egypt	23 August 2019	2019 African Games	Casablanca, Morocco	
100m backstroke	55.02	Abdellah Ardjoune	Algeria	24 August 2019	2019 African Games	Casablanca, Morocco	
200m backstroke	1:59.03	Martin Binedell	South Africa	21 August 2019	2019 African Games	Casablanca, Morocco	
50m breaststroke	27.18	Cameron van der Burgh	South Africa	7 September 2015	2015 African Games	Brazzaville, Congo	
100m breaststroke	1:00.19	Cameron van der Burgh	South Africa	6 September 2015	2015 African Games	Brazzaville, Congo	
200m breaststroke	2:14.21	Alaric Basson	South Africa	23 August 2019	2019 African Games	Casablanca, Morocco	
50m butterfly	23.51	Chad le Clos	South Africa	8 September 2015	2015 African Games	Brazzaville, Congo	
100m butterfly	51.24	Chad le Clos	South Africa	7 September 2015	2015 African Games	Brazzaville, Congo	
200m butterfly	1:56.37	Chad le Clos	South Africa	9 September 2011	2011 All-Africa Games	Maputo, Mozambique	
200m individual medley	2:00.70	Chad le Clos	South Africa	10 September 2011	2011 All-Africa Games	Maputo, Mozambique	
400m individual medley	4:16.88	Chad le Clos	South Africa	6 September 2011	2011 All-Africa Games	Maputo, Mozambique	
4×100m freestyle relay	3:19.42	Leith Shankland; Chad le Clos; Gideon Louw; Darian Townsend	South Africa	8 September 2011	2011 All-Africa Games	Maputo, Mozambique	
4×200m freestyle relay	7:18.62	Brent Szurdoki (1:51.94); Calvyn Justus (1:50.68); Devon Brown (1:48.05); Chad le Clos (1:47.95)	South Africa	8 September 2015	2015 African Games	Brazzaville, Congo	
4×100m medley relay	3:40.24	Martin Binedell (56.46); Alaric Basson (1:00.70); Ryan Coetzee (53.18); Douglas Erasmus (49.90)	South Africa	24 August 2019	2019 African Games	Casablanca, Morocco	

Legend: # – Record awaiting ratification by CANA; WR – World record; AF – African record; e – equalled existing record;
Records not set in finals: h – heat; sf – semifinal; r – relay 1st leg; rh – relay heat 1st leg; b – B final; † – en route to final mark; so – swim-off; tt – time trial

=== Women ===
Event	Time	Name	Nationality	Date	Meet	Location	Ref
50m freestyle	24.72	Farida Osman	Egypt	13 March 2024	2023 African Games	Accra, Ghana	
100m freestyle	55.13	Erin Gallagher	South Africa	21 August 2019	2019 African Games	Casablanca, Morocco	
200m freestyle	1:59.84	Karin Prinsloo	South Africa	6 September 2011	2011 All-Africa Games	Maputo, Mozambique	
400m freestyle	4:15.53	Melissa Corfe	South Africa	July 2007	2007 All-Africa Games	Algiers, Algeria	
800m freestyle	8:43.89	Kirsty Coventry	Zimbabwe	July 2007	2007 All-Africa Games	Algiers, Algeria	
1500m freestyle	16:47.61	Catherine van Rensburg	South Africa	9 March 2024	2023 African Games	Accra, Ghana	
50m backstroke	28.76	Caitlin de Lange	South Africa	11 March 2024	2023 African Games	Accra, Ghana	
100m backstroke	1:00.86	Kirsty Coventry	Zimbabwe	7 September 2011	2011 All-Africa Games	Maputo, Mozambique	
200m backstroke	2:10.66	Kirsty Coventry	Zimbabwe	July 2007	2007 All-Africa Games	Algiers, Algeria	
50m breaststroke	31.91	Simone Moll	South Africa	12 March 2024	2023 African Games	Accra, Ghana	
100m breaststroke	1:07.58	Penny Heyns	South Africa	September 1999	1999 All-Africa Games	Johannesburg, South Africa	
200m breaststroke	2:28.00	Penny Heyns	South Africa	September 1999	1999 All-Africa Games	Johannesburg, South Africa	
50m butterfly	25.94	Farida Osman	Egypt	22 August 2019	2019 African Games	Casablanca, Morocco	
100m butterfly	58.79	Farida Osman	Egypt	23 August 2019	2019 African Games	Casablanca, Morocco	
200m butterfly	2:12.46	Mandy Loots	South Africa	10 September 2011	2011 All-Africa Games	Maputo, Mozambique	
200m individual medley	2:13.02	Kirsty Coventry	Zimbabwe	July 2007	2007 All-Africa Games	Algiers, Algeria	
400m individual medley	4:39.91	Kirsty Coventry	Zimbabwe	July 2007	2007 All-Africa Games	Algiers, Algeria	
4×100m freestyle relay	3:48.47	Farida Osman (55.86); Nour El-Gendy (57.53); Lojine Hamed (57.54); Nadine Abdallah (57.54)	Egypt	12 March 2024	2023 African Games	Accra, Ghana	
4×200m freestyle relay	8:20.28	Rene Warnes (2:04.51); Marlies Ross (2:06.57); Charlise Oberholzer (2:08.04); Karin Prinsloo (2:01.16)	South Africa	6 September 2015	2015 African Games	Brazzaville, Congo	
4×100m medley relay	4:10.90		South Africa	July 2007	2007 All-Africa Games	Algiers, Algeria	

Legend: # – Record awaiting ratification by CANA; WR – World record; AF – African record; e – equalled existing record;
Records not set in finals: h – heat; sf – semifinal; r – relay 1st leg; rh – relay heat 1st leg; b – B final; † – en route to final mark; so – swim-off; tt – time trial

=== Mixed relay ===
Event	Time		Name	Nationality	Date	Meet	Location	Ref
4×100m freestyle relay	3:31.24	AF	Douglas Erasmus (50.42); Ryan Coetzee (49.74); Emma Chelius (55.87); Erin Gallagher (55.21)	South Africa	23 August 2019	2019 African Games	Casablanca, Morocco	
4×100m medley relay	3:50.76		Martin Binedell (55.43); Michael Houlie (59.96); Erin Gallagher (58.98); Emma Chelius (56.39)	South Africa	22 August 2019	2019 African Games	Casablanca, Morocco	

Legend: # – Record awaiting ratification by CANA; WR – World record; AF – African record; e – equalled existing record;
Records not set in finals: h – heat; so – swim-off

== See also ==
- List of African Games medalists in swimming
- List of African Games medalists in swimming (women)
