= Swimming at the 2015 African Games – Men's 1500 metre freestyle =

Men's 1500 metre freestyle at the 2015 African Games
- Venue: Kintele Aquatic Complex
- Date: September 10, 2015
- Competitors: 5 from 4 nations

Medalists
| gold medal | Ahmed Akram | Egypt |
| silver medal | Ahmed Mathlouthi | Tunisia |
| bronze medal | Brent Szurdoki | South Africa |

The Men's 1500 metre freestyle event at the 2015 African Games took place on 10 September 2015 at Kintele Aquatic Complex.

== Schedule ==
All times are Congo Standard Time (UTC+01:00)

| Date | Time | Event |
|---|---|---|
| Thursday, 10 September 2015 | 18:22 | Final |

== Records ==
Prior to the competition, the existing world and championship records were as follows.

| | Name | Nation | Time | Location | Date |
|---|---|---|---|---|---|
| World record | Sun Yang | China | 14:31.02 | London | 4 August 2012 |
| African record | Oussama Mellouli | Tunisia | 14:37.28 | Rome | 2 August 2009 |
| Games record | Troyden Prinsloo | South Africa | 15:24.93 | Algiers | 18 July 2007 |

The following new records were set during this competition.

| Date | Event | Name | Nation | Time | Record |
|---|---|---|---|---|---|
| 10 September | Final | Ahmed Akram | Egypt | 15:11.68 | GR |

== Results ==
=== Final ===
The final were held on 10 September.

| Rank | Lane | Name | Nationality | Time | Notes |
|---|---|---|---|---|---|
| 1st place, gold medalist(s) | 4 | Ahmed Akram | Egypt | 15:11.68 | GR |
| 2nd place, silver medalist(s) | 3 | Ahmed Mathlouthi | Tunisia | 15:30.35 | |
| 3rd place, bronze medalist(s) | 6 | Brent Szurdoki | South Africa | 15:35.48 | |
| 4 | 5 | Marwan El-Amrawy | Egypt | 16:12.82 | |
| 5 | 2 | Imad Tchouar | Algeria | 16:18.80 | |
