= Swimming at the 2015 African Games – Men's 800 metre freestyle =

Men's 800 metre freestyle at the 2015 African Games
- Venue: Kintele Aquatic Complex
- Date: September 7, 2015
- Competitors: 6 from 4 nations
- Winning time: 7:55.36

Medalists
gold medal	Ahmed Akram	Egypt
silver medal	Marwan Elkamash	Egypt
bronze medal	Devon Brown	South Africa

The Men's 800 metre freestyle event at the 2015 African Games took place on 7 September 2015 at Kintele Aquatic Complex.

== Schedule ==
All times are Congo Standard Time (UTC+01:00)

Date	Time	Event
Monday, 7 September 2015	18:13	Final

== Records ==
Prior to the competition, the existing world and championship records were as follows.

	Name	Nation	Time	Location	Date
World record	Zhang Lin	China	7:32.12	Rome	29 July 2009
African record	Oussama Mellouli	Tunisia	7:35.27	Rome	29 July 2009
Games record	Troyden Prinsloo	South Africa	8:02.84	Algiers	16 July 2007

The following new records were set during this competition.

Date	Event	Name	Nation	Time	Record
7 September	Final	Ahmed Akram	Egypt	7:55.36	GR

== Results ==
=== Final ===
The final were held on 7 September.

Rank	Lane	Name	Nationality	Time	Notes
1st place, gold medalist(s)	4	Ahmed Akram	Egypt	7:55.36	GR
2nd place, silver medalist(s)	5	Marwan Elkamash	Egypt	7:59.54	
3rd place, bronze medalist(s)	3	Devon Brown	South Africa	7:59.57	
4	2	Brent Szurdoki	South Africa	8:07.18	
5	6	Ahmed Mathlouthi	Tunisia	8:17.74	
6	7	Imad Tchouar	Algeria	8:25.75	
