= Mehdi Addadi =

Algerian swimmer (born 1978)

Personal information
- Full name: Mehdi Addadi
- Nickname: Mehdi Addadi
- National team: Algeria
- Born: 13 February 1978 (age 48) Dély Ibrahim, Algiers, Algeria
- Height: 1.79 m (5 ft 10 in)
- Weight: 70 kg (154 lb)

Sport
- Sport: Swimming
- Strokes: Backstroke, butterfly
- College team: University of Maryland, Baltimore County (U.S.)
- Coach: Chad Cradock (U.S.)
Medal record
Men's swimming
Representing Algeria
All-Africa Games
Gold medal – first place	1999 Johannesburg	100 m backstroke
Bronze medal – third place	1999 Johannesburg	100 m butterfly

Mehdi Addadi (Arabic: مهدي عدادي; born February 13, 1978) is an Algerian former swimmer, who specialized in sprint backstroke and butterfly events. He collected two medals, a gold and a bronze, from the All-Africa Games, and later represented Algeria, along with Salim Iles, at the 2000 Summer Olympics.

While studying in the United States, Addadi was named 2001 Most Valuable Swimmer at the Eastern College Athletic Conference Championships, and 2002 Most Outstanding Swimmer by the University of Maryland, Baltimore County. He also played for the university's swimming and diving team, under head coach Chad Cradock.

== Career ==
=== Early years ===
Addadi was born in Dély Ibrahim, Algiers, the son of Ibrahim and Salima Addadi. Coming from an athletic pedigree, he started his sporting career at the age of nine. Recreationally, he swam with his brother in the local pool across the city's suburbs, until a prominent coach spotted and later asked them to join the national team. Ten years later, in 1997, Addadi left his homeland Algeria to move to the United States, where he received a full scholarship to attend Bolles School in Jacksonville, Florida. Fluent only in Arabic and French, he credited Bolles as a primary institution to learn English, and also, a training ground to prepare for college career. During his short stay, Addadi trained under Gregg Troy, a coach who produced numerous top-class swimmers including Ryan Lochte.

Addadi attended the University of Maryland, Baltimore County in Baltimore, Maryland, where he played for the UMBC Retrievers swimming and diving team under head coach Chad Cradock. Serving as the team captain, he held the school's records in the 100-yard backstroke (48.85), 200-yard backstroke (1:49.29), and 100-yard butterfly (48.67), and later became a prizewinner of four different records in both freestyle and medley relays. In his senior season, Addadi was named the Most Outstanding Swimmer of the Year at the Eastern College Athletic Conference Championships after breaking a school record in the 100-yard butterfly. In the spring of 2002, Addadi graduated from the university with a bachelor's degree in financial economics.

=== International career ===
In 1999, Addadi attended the All-Africa Games in Johannesburg, South Africa. He broke the host nation's stranglehold after winning the 100 m backstroke title in 58.28, edging out Seychelles' Benjamin Lo-Pinto by almost a full body length. He also added a bronze to his hardware in the 100 m butterfly at 56.30, finishing just outside a top two finish from the South Africans.

At the 2000 Summer Olympics in Sydney, Addadi competed only in two individual events for Algeria, along with Salim Iles. After collecting two medals from the All-Africa Games, his entry times of 58.28 (100 m backstroke) and 56.30 (100 m butterfly) were both officially accredited under a FINA B-standard. On the second day of the Games, Addadi placed forty-sixth in the 100 m backstroke. Swimming in heat two, he raced to a sixth seed in 58.74, just a 1.62-second deficit off a winning time set by South Korea's Sung Min. Five days later, in the 100 m butterfly, Addadi challenged seven other swimmers in the same heat, including Guam's 28-year-old Daniel O'Keeffe and Bosnia's three-time Olympian Janko Gojković. He held off a fast-pacing O'Keeffe by a hundredth of a second (0.01) to snatch a third spot and forty-fourth overall in an Algerian record of 56.04.
