= Swimming at the 1999 All-Africa Games =

Swimming at the 7th All-Africa Games was held 12–18 September 1999 at the Ellis Park Aquatic Complex in Johannesburg, South Africa. The six-day meet featured events in a 50-meter (long course) pool.

== Participating nations ==
128 swimmers from 18 nations were entered in the competition. Among those with swimmers were:

- Algeria
- Angola
- Egypt
- Kenya
- Madagascar
- Mauritius
- Mozambique
- Namibia
- Nigeria
- Senegal
- Seychelles
- South Africa
- Swaziland
- Tunisia
- Zambia
- Zimbabwe

== Schedule ==
Note: Events are listed on correct day, but possibly not in the right order.

Date	12 September	September 13	14 September
E v e n t s	100 free (w); 100 breast (m); 400 IM (w); 200 free (m); 4 × 200 Free Relay (w)	200 breast (w); 100 fly (m); 200 free (w); 400 IM (m); 4 × 200 Free Relay (m)	100 free (m); 400 free (w); 200 back (m); 100 back (w); 4 × 100 Free Relay (w)
Date	15 September	September 16	17 September
E v e n t s	100 fly (w); 200 breast (m); 100 breast (w); 400 free (m); 800 free (w); 4 × 100 Free Relay (m)	50 free (m); 200 IM (w); 200 fly (m); 100 back (m); 1500 free (m); 4 × 100 Medley Relay (w)	200 fly (w); 200 IM (m); 200 back (w); 50 free (w); 4 × 100 Medley Relay

m= men's event, w= women's event

== Results ==
=== Men ===
Event	Gold		Silver		Bronze	
50 m Freestyle	Brendon Dedekind; South Africa	22.36; GR	Nicholas Folker; South Africa	22.83	Salim Iles; Algeria	23.02
100 m Freestyle^{m1}	Brendon Dedekind; South Africa	50.50	Salim Iles; Algeria	50.58	Nicholas Folker; South Africa	50.61
200 m Freestyle	Herman Louw; South Africa	1:52.68	Glen Walshaw; Zimbabwe	1:55.85	Terence Parkin; South Africa	1:56.78
400 m Freestyle	Ryno Markgraaff; South Africa	4:06.93	James Willcox; South Africa	4:08.00	Glen Walshaw; Zimbabwe	4:09.65
1500 m Freestyle	Denis Sirringhaus; South Africa	16:17.53	Ryno Markgraaff; South Africa	16:50.96	Herbert Couacud; Mauritius	16:59.31
100 m Backstroke	Mehdi Addadi; Algeria	58.28	Benjamin Lo-Pinto; Seychelles	59.64	Haitham Hazem; Egypt	59.91
200 m Backstroke	Brett Rogers; South Africa	2:08.83	George Du Rand; South Africa	2:10.41	Benjamin Lo-Pinto; Seychelles	2:11.21
100 m Breaststroke	Brett Petersen; South Africa	1:02.63	Chris Stewart; South Africa	1:06.01	Alan Ogden; Zimbabwe	1:08.08
200 m Breaststroke	Terence Parkin; South Africa	2:16.29; GR	Greg Owen; South Africa	2:21.14	Ayman Khattab; Egypt	2:26.98
100 m Butterfly	Ryan Kelly; South Africa	54.66	Theo Verster; South Africa	54.75	Mehdi Addadi; Algeria	56.30
200 m Butterfly	Theo Verster; South Africa	2:04.69; GR	Raazik Nordien; South Africa	2:08.75	Fares Attar; Algeria	2:10.11
200 m I.M.	Theo Verster; South Africa	2:04.10; GR	Terence Parkin; South Africa	2:07.97	Kenny Roberts; Seychelles	2:11.00
400 m I.M	Terence Parkin; South Africa	4:35.29	Adrian Bosch; South Africa	4:39.06	Kenny Roberts; Seychelles	4:46.26
4 × 100 m Free Relay	South Africa; Brett Rogers, Brett Petersen, Ryan Kelly, Brendon Dedekind	3:51.45	Algeria	3:54.91	Egypt	3:58.22
4 × 200 m Free Relay	South Africa; Herman Louw, James Willcox, Ryno Maarkgraaf, Terence Parkin	7:41.91	Algeria	7:58.54	Seychelles; Kenny Roberts, Jean-Paul Adam, Benjamin Lo-Pinto, Barnsley Albert	8:04.98
4 × 100 m Medley Relay	South Africa	3:51.45	Algeria	3:54.91	Egypt	3:58.22

^{m1} In prelims of the men's 100 free, Algeria's Salim Iles set a new Games Record (GR) of 50.36.

=== Women ===
Event	Gold		Silver		Bronze	
50 m Freestyle	Rania Elwani; Egypt; Stacey Bowley; South Africa	26.56	not awarded		Kirsty Coventry; Zimbabwe	26.72
100 m Freestyle	Charlene Wittstock; South Africa	57.46	Teresa Moodie; Zimbabwe	58.04	Rania Elwani; Egypt	58.12
200 m Freestyle	Kim van Selm; South Africa	2:05.50	Kirsten van Heerden; South Africa	2:06.15	Rania Elwani; Egypt	2:08.08
400 m Freestyle	Kim van Selm; South Africa	4:26.50	Kirsten van Heerden; South Africa	4:27.04	Boutheina Elouer; Tunisia	4:40.03
800 m Freestyle	Kim van Selm; South Africa	9:13.30	Bronwyn Dedekind; South Africa	9:19.04	Maha Elmerghany; Egypt	9:44.72
100 m Backstroke	Charlene Wittstock; South Africa	1:04.31	Kirsty Coventry; Zimbabwe	1:05.29	Taryn Ternent; South Africa	1:05.95
200 m Backstroke	Mandy Loots; South Africa	2:21.22	Taryn Cokayne; South Africa	2:23.27	Mandy Leach; Zimbabwe	2:29.14
100 m Breaststroke^{w1}	Penny Heyns; South Africa	1:07.58; GR	Ziada Jardine; South Africa	1:15.31	Lauren Harvey; Zimbabwe	1:18.05
200 m Breaststroke^{w1}	Penny Heyns; South Africa	2:28.00; GR	Sarah Poewe; South Africa	2:32.80	Lauren Harvey; Zimbabwe	2:53.17
100 m Butterfly	Mandy Loots; South Africa	1:01.32; GR	Candice Crafford; South Africa	1:03.64	Teresa Moodie; Zimbabwe	1:05.18
200 m Butterfly	Mandy Loots; South Africa	2:16.02; GR	Natalie du Toit; South Africa	2:19.80	Kenza Bennaceur; Algeria	2:33.54
200 m I.M.	Mandy Loots; South Africa	2:20.02; GR	Kirsty Coventry; Zimbabwe	2:23.42	Mandy Leach; Zimbabwe	2:25.53
400 m I.M	Mandy Loots; South Africa	4:59.50; GR	Natalie du Toit; South Africa	5:06.62	Kenza Bennaceur; Algeria	5:29.60
4 × 100 m Free Relay^{w2}	Zimbabwe; Kirsty Coventry, Tanya Gurr, Mandy Leach, Teresa Moody	3:53.45	South Africa; Charlene Wittstock, Stacey Bowley, Candice Crafford, Kim van Selm	3:54.31	Egypt	4:11.06
4 × 200 m Free Relay	South Africa; Kirsten van Heerden, Stacey Bowley, Bronwyn Dedekind, Kim van Selm	8:36.76	Zimbabwe	8:47.56	Egypt	9:18.40
4 × 100 m Medley Relay	South Africa; Charlene Wittstock, Penny Heyns, Mandy Loots, Stacey Bowley	4:11.57; GR	Zimbabwe	4:28.96	Egypt	4:48.17

^{w1} In winning the Women's 100 and 200 Breaststrokes, South Africa's Penny Heynes defended the 2 titles she won at the 1995 All-Africa Games.
^{w2} Order of swimmers for the women's 4 × 100 Free Relay may be off, however, Moody (Zimbabwe) and Van Selm (South Africa) were the fourth swimmers for their relays.

=== Medal standings ===
Rank	Nation	Gold	Silver	Bronze	Total
1	South Africa	30	20	3	53
2	Zimbabwe	1	6	8	15
3	Algeria	1	4	5	10
4	Egypt	1	0	10	11
5	Seychelles	0	1	4	5
6	Mauritius	0	0	1	1
6	Tunisia	0	0	1	1
Totals (7 entries)		33	31	32	96
