= Kenza Bennaceur =

Algerian swimmer (born 1976)

Personal information
- Full name: Kenza Bennaceur
- Nationality: Algeria
- Born: 14 January 1976 (age 50) Algiers, Algeria

Sport
- Sport: Swimming
- Strokes: Butterfly, medley
Medal record
Women's swimming
Representing Algeria
All-Africa Games
Bronze medal – third place	1999 Johannesburg	200 m butterfly
Bronze medal – third place	1999 Johannesburg	400 m medley

Kenza Bennaceur (Arabic: كنزة بن ناصر; born January 14, 1976) is an Algerian former swimmer, who specialized in butterfly and in individual medley events. She won two bronze medals in the 200 m butterfly (2:33.54) and 400 m individual medley (5:29.60) at the 1999 All-Africa Games in Johannesburg, South Africa.

Bennaceur competed only in the women's 100 m butterfly at the 2000 Summer Olympics in Sydney. She achieved a FINA B-cut of 1:07.00 from the All-Africa Games. Swimming in heat two, Bennaceur decided to scratch out from the race, and then withdrew from the Games for personal and health reasons on the first day of prelims.
