= Lize-Mari Retief =

South African swimmer (born 1986)

Personal information
- Nationality: South Africa
- Born: 30 November 1986 (age 39) Bloemfontein, South Africa

Sport
- Sport: Swimming
Medal record
Commonwealth Games
Bronze medal – third place	Melbourne 2006	50 fly
All-Africa Games
Gold medal – first place	Abuja 2003	50 back
Gold medal – first place	Abuja 2003	50 fly
Gold medal – first place	Abuja 2003	100 fly
Gold medal – first place	Abuja 2003	200 fly
Gold medal – first place	Abuja 2003	200 IM
Silver medal – second place	Abuja 2003	200 back

Lize-Mari Retief (born 30 November 1986 in Bloemfontein, South Africa) is an Olympic and national-record-holding swimmer from South Africa. She swam for South Africa at the 2008 Olympics.

At the 2008 South African Nationals in April, she set 3 South African Records: 50 free, 50 fly and 100 fly.

She has swum for South Africa at the:

- Olympics: 2008
- Commonwealth Games: 2006
- All-Africa Games: 2003

At the 2003 All-Africa Games, she won the most individual medals of any female swimmer: 5 golds and 1 silver.
