= Ali Gharbi =

Tunisian swimmer (1955–2009)

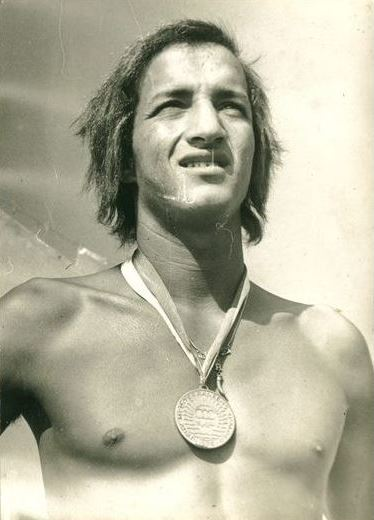
- Ali Gharbi

Personal information
- Born: 18 April 1955
- Died: 12 December 2009 (aged 54)

Sport
- Sport: Swimming
Medal record
Men's swimming
Representing Tunisia
Mediterranean Games
Gold medal – first place	1975 Algiers	400 m freestyle
Bronze medal – third place	1975 Algiers	1500 m freestyle
All-Africa Games
Gold medal – first place	1973 Lagos	400 m freestyle
Gold medal – first place	1978 Algiers	100 m freestyle
Gold medal – first place	1978 Algiers	200 m freestyle
Gold medal – first place	1978 Algiers	400 m freestyle
Gold medal – first place	1978 Algiers	1500 m freestyle
Gold medal – first place	1978 Algiers	100 m backstroke
Gold medal – first place	1978 Algiers	200 m backstroke
Silver medal – second place	1973 Lagos	200 m freestyle
Silver medal – second place	1973 Lagos	100 m backstroke
Silver medal – second place	1973 Lagos	200 m medley
Silver medal – second place	1978 Algiers	100 m butterfly

Ali Gharbi (18 April 1955 - 12 December 2009) was a Tunisian former swimmer who competed in the 1976 Summer Olympics. He was considered the best Arab and African swimmer before the rise of Oussama Mellouli. In 1977, he joined his teammate in the national team, Myriam Mizouni, at Esperance Sportif in Tunis and, together, they won numerous events. He died at the age of 54 after a long illness.
