= Kenny Roberts (swimmer) =

Seychellois swimmer (born 1978)

Personal information
- Full name: Kenny Roberts
- National team: Seychelles
- Born: 12 May 1978 (age 48) Victoria, Seychelles
- Height: 1.80 m (5 ft 11 in)
- Weight: 75 kg (165 lb)

Sport
- Sport: Swimming
- Strokes: Freestyle, breaststroke, medley
- Club: Bolles School (US)
- College team: Clemson University (US)
Medal record
Men's swimming
Representing the Seychelles
All-Africa Games
Bronze medal – third place	1999 Johannesburg	200 m medley
Bronze medal – third place	1999 Johannesburg	400 m medley

Kenny Roberts (born 12 May 1978) is a Seychellois former swimmer, who specialised in sprint freestyle, but also competed in breaststroke and in individual medley. He represented the Seychelles in all three editions of the Olympic Games, since the nation made its comeback in 1992. While studying in the United States, he played for the Bolles School's Sharks Club, under head coach Gregg Troy, and later for the Clemson University's swimming and diving team, also known as the Clemson Tigers. Currently, Roberts is the chairman of the Seychelles Swimming Association (SSA).

Roberts made his official debut, as a 14-year-old, at the 1992 Summer Olympics in Barcelona. He failed to reach the top 16 final in any of his individual events, finishing sixty-eighth in the 50 m freestyle (26.78), seventy-second in the 100 m freestyle (58.86), fifty-eighth in the 100 m breaststroke (1:16.52), and fifty-first in the 200 m individual medley (2:30.35). He was disqualified in the 200 m breaststroke for an illegal dolphin kick during the race.

At the 1996 Summer Olympics in Atlanta, Roberts swam only in the 100 m freestyle. He placed fifty-second on the morning prelims in a Seychellois record of 52.89.

Three years later, at the 1999 All-Africa Games in Johannesburg, South Africa, Roberts won two bronze medals for Seychelles, in the 200 m individual medley (2:11.00), and the 400 m individual medley (4:46.26).

Eight years after competing in his first Olympics, Roberts swam for the third time in the 100 m freestyle, as a 22-year-old, at the 2000 Summer Olympics in Sydney. He achieved a FINA B-cut of 52.59 from the All-Africa Games. He challenged seven other swimmers in heat three, including Trinidad and Tobago's 16-year-old George Bovell. Coming from sixth on the initial length, Roberts faded down the stretch to pick up a seventh seed in a time of 53.91, just 1.32 seconds below his entry standard. Roberts failed to advance into the semi-finals for his third Olympic run, as he placed sixty-first overall in the prelims.
