= Swimming at the 2003 All-Africa Games =

Swimming at the 8th All-Africa Games was held October 5–11, 2003 in Abuja, Nigeria. 117 swimmers from 21 nations swam in the meet. Competition was held in a 50-meter (long course) pool.

The 2003 edition saw the addition to the Games program of the 50s of the strokes (Backstroke, Breaststroke and Butterfly), the Men's 800 Freestyle and the Women's 1500 Freestyle, bringing the total number of events to 40.

== Results ==
=== Men ===
Event	Gold		Silver		Bronze	
50 m Freestyle	Salim Iles; Algeria	22.71	Stephan Ackerman; South Africa	23.66	Kurt Muller; South Africa	23.83
100 m Freestyle	Salim Iles; Algeria	50.32	Stephan Ackerman; South Africa	51.54	Haitham Hazem; Egypt	52.26
200 m Freestyle	Oussama Mellouli; Tunisia	1:52.94	Stephan Ackerman; South Africa	1:54.17	Nic Wilson; South Africa	1:54.82
400 m Freestyle	Oussama Mellouli; Tunisia	4:00.43	Anouar Ben Naceur; Tunisia	4:06.51	Mahrez Mebarek; Algeria	4:07.59
800 m Freestyle	Oussama Mellouli; Tunisia	8:12.26	Omar El Gamal; Egypt	8:33.49	Khaled Hanafy; Egypt	8:36.78
1500 m Freestyle	Oussama Mellouli; Tunisia	15:35.97	Omar El Gamal; Egypt	16:21.49	Khaled Hanafy; Egypt	16:40.61
50 m Backstroke	Ahmed Hussein; Egypt	25.89	Simon Thirsk; South Africa	27.04	Haitham Hazem; Egypt	27.30
100 m Backstroke	Ahmed Hussein; Egypt	55.75	Simon Thirsk; South Africa	57.60	Haitham Hazem; Egypt	58.46
200 m Backstroke	Ahmed Hussein; Egypt	2:02.46	Jeff Norton; South Africa	2:07.42	Simon Thirsk; South Africa	2:09.79
50 m Breaststroke	Kurt Muller; South Africa	28.75	Sofiane Daid; Algeria	29.10	Malick Fall; Senegal	29.28
100 m Breaststroke	Kurt Muller; South Africa	1:02.99	Sofiane Daid; Algeria	1:04.05	Ayman Khattab; Egypt	1:04.10
200 m Breaststroke	Neil Versfeld; South Africa	2:16.86	Ayman Khattab; Egypt	2:18.49	Malick Fall; Senegal	2:20.33
50 m Butterfly	Stephan Ackerman; South Africa	24.79	Haitham Hazem; Egypt	24.84	Kurt Muller; South Africa	25.21
100 m Butterfly	Haitham Hazem; Egypt	54.81	Stephan Ackerman; South Africa	54.95	Ahmed Salah; Egypt	55.25
200 m Butterfly	Ahmed Salah; Egypt	2:02.91	Ahmed El Abbadi; Egypt	2:03.99	Anouar Ben Naceur; Tunisia	2:05.15
200 m I.M.	Oussama Mellouli; Tunisia	2:06.91	Malick Fall; Senegal	2:09.08	Neil Versfeld; South Africa	2:09.91
400 m I.M	Oussama Mellouli; Tunisia	4:29.68	Neil Versfeld; South Africa	4:39.37	Omar El Gamal; Egypt	4:46.08
4 × 100 m Free Relay	Algeria	3:27.05	South Africa	3:29.63	Egypt	3:55.25
4 × 200 m Free Relay	South Africa	7:42.45	Algeria	7:45.22	Egypt	7:50.91
4 × 100 m Medley Relay	Egypt	3:46.67	South Africa	3:47.92	Algeria	3:55.25

=== Women ===
Event	Gold		Silver		Bronze	
50 m Freestyle	Lauren Roets; South Africa	26.31	Ngozi Monu; Nigeria	27.71	Nadia Chahed; Tunisia	28.16
100 m Freestyle	Lauren Roets; South Africa	56.79	Christin Zwiegers; South Africa	57.90	Salma Zeinhoum; Egypt	58.53
200 m Freestyle	Lauren Roets; South Africa	2:06.27	Kirsten van Heerden; South Africa	2:08.84	Khadua Ciss; Senegal	2:09.00
400 m Freestyle	Kirsten van Heerden; South Africa	4:28.19	Heba Selim; Egypt	4:29.13	Shrone Austin; Seychelles	4:30.84
800 m Freestyle	Natalie du Toit; South Africa	9:09.66	Shrone Austin; Seychelles	9:13.03	Heba Selim; Egypt	9:17.15
1500 m Freestyle	Velia van Rensburg; South Africa	17:24.64	Shrone Austin; Seychelles	17:30.27	Heba Selim; Egypt	17:35.23
50 m Backstroke	Lize-Mari Retief; South Africa	30.10	Romy Altmann; South Africa	30.29	Inyengiyik Obia; Nigeria	31.06
100 m Backstroke	Romy Altmann; South Africa	1:02.89	Jo-Ann Bergman; South Africa	1:07.61	Sarah Chahed; Tunisia	1:07.94
200 m Backstroke	Romy Altmann; South Africa	2:15.15	Lize-Mari Retief; South Africa	2:22.50	Soha Abdallah; Egypt	2:26.12
50 m Breaststroke	Ingrid Haiden; South Africa	32.89	Ziada Jardine; South Africa	32.99	Salma Zeinhoum; Egypt	33.33
100 m Breaststroke	Ingrid Haiden; South Africa	1:11.00	Salma Zeinhoum; Egypt	1:11.92	Ziada Jardine; South Africa	1:12.82
200 m Breaststroke	Ingrid Haiden; South Africa	2:32.66	Salma Zeinhoum; Egypt	2:37.20	Ziada Jardine; South Africa	2:43.50
50 m Butterfly	Lize-Mari Retief; South Africa	27.56	Lauren Sparg; South Africa	28.53	May Raafat; Egypt	29.78
100 m Butterfly	Lize-Mari Retief; South Africa	1:01.78	Lauren Sparg; South Africa	1:02.63	May Raafat; Egypt	1:05.01
200 m Butterfly	Lize-Mari Retief; South Africa	2:17.47	Chanelle Van Wyk; South Africa	2:20.05	May Raafat; Egypt	2:20.80
200 m I.M.	Lize-Mari Retief; South Africa	2:21.64	Salma Zeinhoum; Egypt	2:23.89	Bianca Meyer; South Africa	2:24.42
400 m I.M	Bianca Meyer; South Africa	5:03.06	Shrone Austin; Seychelles	5:09.41	Kirsten van Heerden; South Africa	5:13.75
4 × 100 m Free Relay	South Africa	3:52.74	Egypt	4:04.68	Tunisia	4:04.68
4 × 200 m Free Relay	South Africa	8:40.84	Egypt	8:45.18	Tunisia	9:53.35
4 × 100 m Medley Relay	South Africa	4:11.37	Egypt	4:31.84	Tunisia	4:37.84

=== Medal standings ===
Rank	Nation	Gold	Silver	Bronze	Total
1	South Africa	25	19	9	53
2	Egypt	6	12	18	36
3	Tunisia	6	1	6	13
4	Algeria	3	3	2	8
5	Seychelles	0	3	1	4
6	Senegal	0	1	3	4
7	Nigeria	0	1	1	2
Totals (7 entries)		40	40	40	120
