= Haitham Hazem =

Egyptian swimmer (born 1978)

Haitham Hassan
Personal information
- Full name: Haitham Hazem Mohamed; Hassan
- National team: Egypt
- Born: 8 November 1978 (age 47) Alexandria, Egypt
- Height: 1.96 m (6 ft 5 in)
- Weight: 92 kg (203 lb)

Sport
- Sport: Swimming
- Strokes: Backstroke, butterfly, medley
- Club: Alexandria Sport Club
- College team: Oakland University (U.S.)
- Coach: Pete Hovland (U.S.)
Medal record
Men's swimming
Representing Egypt
All-Africa Games
Gold medal – first place	2003 Abuja	100 m butterfly
Silver medal – second place	2003 Abuja	50 m butterfly
Bronze medal – third place	1999; Johannesburg	100 m backstroke
Bronze medal – third place	2003 Abuja	100 m freestyle
Bronze medal – third place	2003 Abuja	50 m backstroke
Bronze medal – third place	2003 Abuja	100 m backstroke

Haitham Hazem Mohamed Hassan (Arabic: هيثم حازم محمد حسن; born 8 November 1978) is an Egyptian former swimmer, who specialized in backstroke, butterfly, and individual medley events. He collected a total of six medals (one gold, one silver, and four bronze) from the All-Africa Games, and later represented Egypt at the 2000 Summer Olympics. While studying in the United States, Hassan was named 2000 Mid-Continent Conference Athlete of the Year and 2001 Swimmer of the Year by The Summit League. He also played for the Oakland University's swimming and diving team, under head coach Pete Hovland.

== College career ==
Hassan, a native of Alexandria, Egypt, started his sporting career in his early teenage years as a member of Alexandria Sports Club. At age nineteen, Hassan accepted an athletic scholarship to attend the Oakland University in Rochester, Michigan, where he played for the Oakland Golden Grizzlies swimming and diving team under head coach Pete Hovland. In 2000, he set Mid-Con records in the 100-yard butterfly (48.70) and 200-yard individual medley (1:50.60), and was also part of the 200-yard medley relay team that claimed a first-place finish at the Mid-Continental Conference Championships. In 2001, Hassan was named Men's Swimmer of the Year by The Summit League, after seizing a lead in the 100-yard butterfly (48.24), 200-yard butterfly (1:48.30), and 200-yard individual medley (1:49.70) from the same tournament. Hassan graduated from the university with a Bachelor of Science degree major in mechanical engineering.

== International career ==
Hassan made his official worldwide debut, as a member of the Egyptian squad, at the 1999 All-Africa Games in Johannesburg, South Africa, where he earned a bronze medal in the 100 m backstroke at 59.91.

At the 2000 Summer Olympics in Sydney, Hassan competed only in three individual events. He posted FINA B-standards of 57.53 (100 m backstroke), 55.91 (100 m butterfly), and 2:07.51 (200 m individual medley) from the U.S. and Egyptian National Championships. Marching in the parade of nations during the opening ceremony, Hassan recalled his proudest moment: “I was so happy, I couldn’t take it, I was swimming the very next day, but I didn’t care about getting tired or worn out. I wanted to be there. I had to see the Opening Ceremonies". Two days after the opening, Hassan placed forty-fourth in the 100 m backstroke. Swimming in heat three, he rounded out the field to last place in 58.67, nearly a 1.4-second deficit behind winner Blaž Medvešek of Slovenia. In the 200 m individual medley, Hassan finished fifty-first in 2:09.92, more than two seconds off his entry time. The following day, in the 100 m butterfly, Hassan delivered a worst performance with a fifty-third-place effort on the morning prelims. Swimming in the same heat, he escaped from behind to earn a sixth seed in a time of 56.42. Frustrated and upset, he explained what went wrong from his final event: “I felt like I was moving my arms faster than I had ever done but I wasn’t catching any water. I was so mad, but I’m not a quitter.”

Three years later, at the 2003 All-Africa Games in Abuja, Nigeria, Hassan won a total of five medals, including his first ever gold in the 100 m butterfly (54.81). He also collected a silver in the 50 m butterfly (24.84), and three bronze each in the 50 m backstroke (27.30), 100 m backstroke (58.46), and 100 m freestyle (52.26).

In 2004, Hassan announced his retirement from a short-term career in swimming. He is currently working as a head coach for the American Swimming Academy in Alexandria, and also for swimmer Amr El Sayed, who competed for both the same collegiate and national team in middle-distance freestyle at the 2010 Summer Youth Olympics in Singapore.

== Personal life ==
Following his only Olympic stint, Hassan married his longtime girlfriend Samar at a traditional Islamic ceremony in his hometown Alexandria before returning to Oakland University for his college swimming season.
