= Graham Thompson (swimmer) =

Zimbabwean swimmer (born 1964)

Personal information
- Born: 2 May 1964 (age 62)

Sport
- Sport: Swimming
Medal record
Men's swimming
Representing Zimbabwe
All-Africa Games
| Silver medal – second place | 1991 Cairo | 200 m medley |
| Bronze medal – third place | 1987 Nairobi | 100 m butterfly |

Graham Thompson (born 2 May 1964) is a Zimbabwean butterfly, freestyle and medley swimmer. He competed in four events at the 1988 Summer Olympics.
