= Glen Walshaw =

Zimbabwean swimmer (born 1976)

Personal information
- Full name: Glen Walshaw
- National team: Zimbabwe
- Born: 25 July 1976 (age 49) Harare, Zimbabwe
- Height: 1.88 m (6 ft 2 in)
- Weight: 75 kg (165 lb)
- Spouse: Eileen Walshaw

Sport
- Sport: Swimming
- Strokes: Freestyle
- College team: University of Alabama (U.S.)
- Coach: Jonty Skinner (U.S.)
Medal record
Men's swimming
Representing Zimbabwe
All-Africa Games
Silver medal – second place	1999 Johannesburg	200 m freestyle
Bronze medal – third place	1999 Johannesburg	400 m freestyle

Glen Walshaw (born 25 July 1976) is a Zimbabwean former swimmer, who specialized in sprint and middle-distance freestyle events. He is a double medalist at the All-Africa Games (1999), and later represented Zimbabwe at the 2000 Summer Olympics in Sydney. For almost thirteen years, Walshaw currently holds a Zimbabwean record in the 200 m freestyle. While studying in the United States, he received two All-American honors in the freestyle relay as a member of the Alabama Crimson Tide swimming and diving team.

At the 1999 All-Africa Games in Johannesburg, South Africa, Walshaw won a total of two medals: a silver medal in the 200 m freestyle (1:55.85) and bronze in the 400 m freestyle (4:09.65).

Walshaw competed in a freestyle double (both 100 and 200 m) at the 2000 Summer Olympics in Sydney. He posted FINA B-standards of 52.08 (100 m freestyle) and 1:52.75 (200 m freestyle) from the U.S. National Championships in Fort Lauderdale, Florida. In the 200 m freestyle, Walshaw placed fortieth on the morning prelims. Swimming in heat four, he rounded out the field to last place in a new Zimbabewan record of 1:54.70. Two days later, in the 100 m freestyle, Walshaw challenged seven other swimmers in the same heat, including Fiji's three-time Olympian Carl Probert. He raced to seventh place and fifty-second overall in 52.53, more than half a second off his entry time.
