= Vaughan Smith (swimmer) =

Zimbabwean swimmer (born 1969)

Personal information
- Born: 16 April 1969 (age 57)

Sport
- Sport: Swimming
Medal record
Men's swimming
Representing Zimbabwe
All-Africa Games
Bronze medal – third place	1987 Nairobi	100 m freestyle

Vaughan Smith (born 16 April 1969) is a Zimbabwean freestyle and medley swimmer. He competed in four events at the 1988 Summer Olympics.
