= Anouar Ben Naceur =

Tunisian swimmer (born 1983)

Personal information
- Full name: Anouar Ben Naceur
- National team: Tunisia
- Born: 22 August 1983 (age 42)
- Height: 1.75 m (5 ft 9 in)

Sport
- Sport: Swimming
- Strokes: Freestyle
Medal record
Men's swimming
Representing Tunisia
All-Africa Games
Silver medal – second place	2003 Abuja	200 m freestyle

Anouar Ben Naceur (Arabic: انور بن ناصر; born August 22, 1983) is a Tunisian former swimmer, who specialized in freestyle events. He won a silver medal in the 400 m freestyle at the 2003 All-Africa Games in Abuja, Nigeria, placing second behind fellow Tunisian Oussama Mellouli with a time of 4:06.51.

Ben Naceur qualified for the men's 200 m freestyle at the 2004 Summer Olympics in Athens, by clearing a FINA B-standard entry time of 1:54.93 from the All-Africa Games in Abuja one year earlier. He challenged seven other swimmers in heat two, including dual citizen Mihail Alexandrov of Bulgaria. He edged out Singapore's Mark Chay in a close race for fourth seed by a hundredth of a second (0.01), posting his lifetime best of 1:54.69. Ben Naceur failed to advance into the semifinals, as he placed fiftieth overall in the preliminaries.
