= Simon Thirsk =

South African swimmer (born 1977)

Personal information
- Full name: Simon Thirsk
- National team: South Africa
- Born: 15 May 1977 (age 49) Cape Town, South Africa
- Height: 1.79 m (5 ft 10 in)
- Weight: 72 kg (159 lb)

Sport
- Sport: Swimming
- Strokes: Backstroke
- Club: Camps Bay Aquatics Club
- College team: University of Hawaii (US)
- Coach: Sam Freas (US)
Medal record
Men's swimming
Representing South Africa
Universiade
Gold medal – first place	1999 Palma	100 m backstroke
All-Africa Games
Silver medal – second place	2003 Abuja	50 m backstroke
Silver medal – second place	2003 Abuja	100 m backstroke
Bronze medal – third place	2003 Abuja	200 m backstroke

Simon Thirsk (born 15 May 1977 in Cape Town) is a retired South African swimmer, who specialised in backstroke events.

== Career and awards ==
Thirsk won a gold medal in the 100 m backstroke at the 1999 Summer Universiade, and later represented South Africa at the 2000 Summer Olympics. While residing in the United States, Thirsk played for the University of Hawaii's swimming and diving team, also known as the Hawaii Rainbow Warriors, under head coach Sam Freas.

Thirsk burst onto the global scene at the 1999 Summer Universiade in Palma de Mallorca. In the 100 m backstroke, he fought off a challenge from Japan's Keitaro Konnai to power home with South Africa's first ever gold in 55.97.

At the 2000 Summer Olympics in Sydney, Thirsk competed only in two swimming events. After winning a gold medal from the University Games, his entry time of 55.97 was officially accredited under a FINA A-standard. In the 100 m backstroke, Thirsk challenged seven other swimmers in heat six, including Cuba's Olympic silver medalist Rodolfo Falcón and Australia's overwhelming favourite Matt Welsh. He rounded out the field to last place and thirtieth overall by a 2.36-second deficit behind winner Welsh in 57.06. Thirsk also teamed up with Brett Petersen, Nicholas Folker, and Theo Verster in the 4 × 100 m medley relay. Leading off a backstroke leg in heat two, Thirsk recorded a split of 56.88, but the South Africans finished the race in fourth place and thirteenth overall with a final time of 3:42.44.

Three years later, at the 2003 All-Africa Games in Abuja, Nigeria, Thirsk collected a total of three medals: two silvers in the 50 m backstroke (27.04) and 100 m backstroke (57.60), and a single bronze in the 200 m backstroke (2:09.79).
