= Brett Petersen =

South African swimmer

Personal information
- Full name: Brett Petersen
- National team: South Africa
- Born: 9 September 1976 (age 49) East London, South Africa
- Height: 1.91 m (6 ft 3 in)
- Weight: 95 kg (209 lb)

Sport
- Sport: Swimming
- Strokes: Breaststroke
- College team: Florida State University (US)
- Coach: Neil Harper (US)
Medal record
Men's swimming
Representing South Africa
Goodwill Games
Silver medal – second place	2001 Brisbane	50 m breaststroke
All-Africa Games
Gold medal – first place	1999 Johannesburg	100 m breaststroke

Brett Petersen (born 9 September 1976) is a South African former swimmer, who specialised in breaststroke events. He won a gold medal in the 100 m breaststroke at the 1999 All-Africa Games, and later became a top 8 finalist in the same distance at the 2000 Summer Olympics. While studying in the United States, Petersen was part of the 200-yard medley relay team that claimed a top finish at the 1998 Atlantic Coast Conference Swimming Championships. Petersen also played for the Florida State Seminoles swimming and diving team under head coach Neil Harper, and later became a graduate of management information systems at the Florida State University in Tallahassee, Florida.

Petersen established his swimming history at the 1999 Pan Pacific Swimming Championships in Sydney, where he placed fourth in the 100 m breaststroke, just a small fraction outside the podium. On that same year, Petersen powered home with a gold medal for South Africa in the 100 m breaststroke (1:02.63) at the All-Africa Games in Johannesburg.

At the 2000 Summer Olympics in Sydney, Petersen competed only in two swimming events. He established a South African record and achieved a FINA A-standard of 1:01.62 from the Olympic trials in Johannesburg. In the 100 m breaststroke, Petersen finished seventh in a time of 1:01.63, holding off Switzerland's Remo Lütolf by a quarter of a second (0.25). Petersen also teamed up with Simon Thirsk, Nicholas Folker, and Theo Verster in the 4 × 100 m medley relay. Swimming a breaststroke leg in heat two, Petersen recorded a split of 1:02.51, but the South Africans finished the race in fourth place and thirteenth overall with a final time of 3:42.44.

At the 2001 Goodwill Games in Brisbane, Petersen fought off a challenge from Australia's Simon Cowley to pick up a silver medal in the 50 m breaststroke (28.72).

The following year, at the 2002 Commonwealth Games in Manchester, England, Petersen failed to receive a single medal in any of his individual events, finishing fourth in the 50 m breaststroke (28.64) and fifth in the 100 m breaststroke (1:02.14).
