= Nicholas Folker =

South African swimmer (born 1976)

Personal information
- Full name: Nicholas Folker
- National team: South Africa
- Born: 26 October 1976 (age 49) Pietermaritzburg, South Africa
- Height: 1.93 m (6 ft 4 in)
- Weight: 85 kg (187 lb)

Sport
- Sport: Swimming
- Strokes: Freestyle
- Club: Pietermaritzburg Seals
- College team: University of Hawaii (U.S.)
- Coach: Sam Freas (U.S.)
Medal record
Men's swimming
Representing South Africa
Universiade
Bronze medal – third place	1999 Palma	100 m freestyle
All-Africa Games
Silver medal – second place	1999 Johannesburg	50 m freestyle
Bronze medal – third place	1999 Johannesburg	100 m freestyle

Nicholas Folker (born October 26, 1976) is a South African former swimmer, who specialized in sprint freestyle events. He captured two medals at the 1999 All-Africa Games, and later represented South Africa at the 2000 Summer Olympics. Folker was schooled in Kwa-Zulu Natal, South Africa. His primary years were spent at Cowan House Preparatory School, after which he attended Michaelhouse. In recognition of his achievements and dedication to swimming, Michaelhouse renamed one of its swimming pools the Folker Pool. While moving on to reside in the United States, Folker achieved school records in a sprint freestyle double and also trained for the University of Hawaii's swimming and diving team, also known as the Hawaii Rainbow Warriors, under the tutelage of head coach Sam Freas.

Folker made his own swimming history at the 1999 Summer Universiade in Palma de Mallorca, Spain, where he earned a bronze medal in the 100 m freestyle at 50.77, finishing behind Russia's Denis Pimankov and Italy's Mauro Gallo. When his nation South Africa hosted the All-Africa Games in Johannesburg on that year, Folker added two more medals to his career hardware in front of a massive home crowd: a silver in the 50 m freestyle (22.83) and another bronze in the 100 m freestyle (50.61).

At the 2000 Summer Olympics in Sydney, Folker competed in two swimming events with only six days in between. First, he teamed up with Roland Mark Schoeman, Brendon Dedekind, and deaf-mute Terence Parkin in the 4 × 100 m freestyle relay. Swimming the third leg in heat two, Folker overhauled a 50-second barrier and recorded a split of 49.57, but the South Africans missed the top 8 final by 1.09 seconds, finishing in fifth place and eleventh overall with an African standard of 3:21.28. Because of his powerful effort in the freestyle relay, Folker was selected to join with Simon Thirsk, Brett Petersen, and Theo Verster in the 4 × 100 m medley relay six days later. During the prelims race, he swam a freestyle leg in the same heat with a scintillating anchor of 49.53 to deliver a fourth-place finish and thirteenth overall for the South Africans in 3:42.44.

The following year, at the 2001 Goodwill Games in Brisbane, Australia, Folker, along with his teammate Schoeman and Latin American sprinters José Meolans (Argentina) and Fernando Scherer (Brazil), captured a silver medal for the all-stars team in the freestyle relay (3:18.78).

Since his sporting career ended in 2004, Folker worked as a strength and conditioning coach for the California Golden Bears men's swimming and diving team at the University of California, Berkeley. He was hired to be an assistant coach at his alma mater, the Hawaii Rainbow Warriors and Rainbow Wahine swimming and diving teams in September 2019. Currently, Folker works as a coach at Gulliver Preparatory School in Miami, Florida.
