= Theo Verster =

South African swimmer (born 1975)

Personal information
- Full name: Theophilus Verster
- National team: South Africa
- Born: 14 January 1975 (age 51) Durban, South Africa
- Height: 1.78 m (5 ft 10 in)
- Weight: 68 kg (150 lb)

Sport
- Sport: Swimming
- Strokes: Butterfly, medley
- Club: Pietermaritzburg Seals
- Coach: Alisdair Hatfield
Medal record
Men's swimming
Representing South Africa
All-Africa Games
Gold medal – first place	1999 Johannesburg	200 m butterfly
Gold medal – first place	1999 Johannesburg	200 m medley
Silver medal – second place	1999 Johannesburg	100 m butterfly

Theophilus "Theo" Verster (born 14 January 1975) is a South African former swimmer, who specialised in butterfly and in individual medley events. He won three medals at the 1999 All-Africa Games, and later represented South Africa at the 2000 Summer Olympics. He also held an African record of 55.04 from the 2002 Telkom International Sprint Challenge that defeated Terence Parkin for a top finish and sliced off Brendon Dedekind's standard by 0.37 of a second. During his sporting career, Verster trained full-time under his personal coach Alisdair Hatfield.

Verster ascended to prominence in the global scene at the 1999 Pan Pacific Swimming Championships in Sydney, placing seventh each in the 100 m butterfly (54.28) and 200 m individual medley (2:04.24). On that same year, at the All-Africa Games in Johannesburg, Verster established meet records to claim two golds each in the 200 m butterfly (2:04.69) and in the 200 m individual medley (2:04.10). In the 100 m butterfly, he was upstaged by teammate Kelly on a head-to-head race, ending up only with a silver in 54.75.

At the 2000 Summer Olympics in Sydney, Verster built a monstrous program of four swimming events. He posted FINA A-standards of 53.86 (100 m butterfly), 2:01.63 (200 m butterfly), and 2:03.11 (200 m individual medley) from the South African Championships in Johannesburg. On the third day of the Games, Verster placed twenty-sixth in the 200 m butterfly. Swimming in heat three, he picked up a fourth seed by almost a full body length behind winner Vladan Marković of Yugoslavia in 2:00.90. Two days later, in the 200 m individual medley, Verster finished twentieth in 2:03.64, nearly a small fraction of a second outside the semi-final field. In his final individual event, 100 m butterfly, Verster posted a time of 53.95 from heat five, but missed again the semi-finals by 0.14 of a second with an eighteenth-place effort. Verster also teamed up with Simon Thirsk, Brett Petersen, and Nicholas Folker in the 4 × 100 m medley relay. Swimming a butterfly leg in heat two, Verster recorded a split of 53.52, a national record, but the South Africans finished the race in fourth place and thirteenth overall with a final time of 3:42.44.

Verster also sought his entry bid for the 2004 Summer Olympics in Athens, but finished fourth in the 100 m butterfly (54.82) at the South African Championships, handing over to his teammate Eugene Botes. Shortly after the trials, Verster announced his retirement from swimming. He is currently working as a full-time coach for Saint Andrew's School for Girls in Johannesburg.
