= Penelope Heyns =

South African swimmer (born 1974)

Penny Heyns
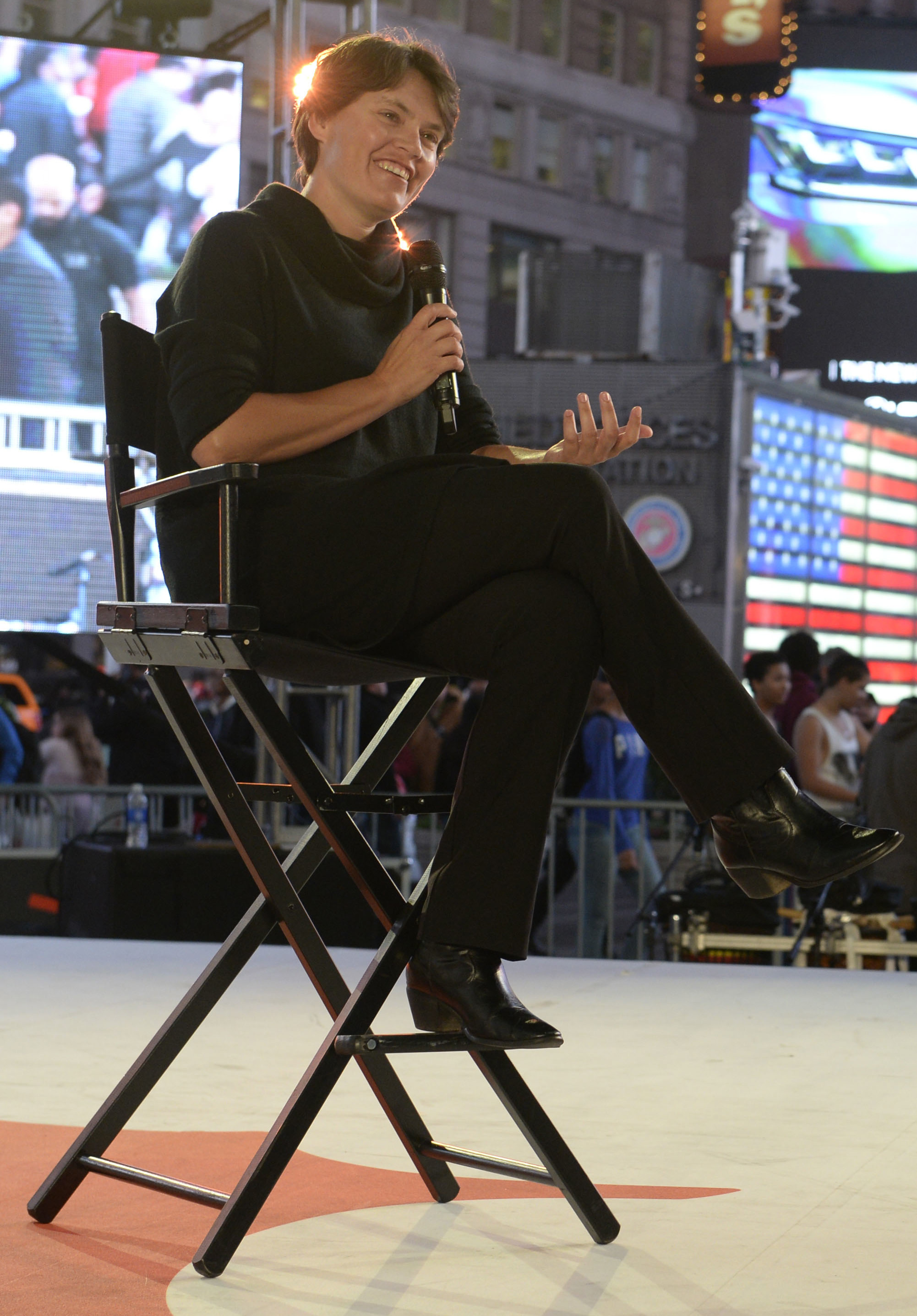
- Penelope Heyns in Times Square, New York (2015)

Personal information
- Full name: Penelope Heyns
- Nickname: Penny
- Nationality: South Africa
- Born: 8 November 1974 (age 51) Springs, Transvaal (now Gauteng)
- Height: 5 ft 9 in (175 cm)
- Weight: 139 lb (63 kg)

Sport
- Sport: Swimming
- Strokes: breaststroke
- College team: University of Nebraska–Lincoln, USA
Medal record
Women's swimming
Representing South Africa
Olympic Games
Gold medal – first place	1996 Atlanta	100 m breaststroke
Gold medal – first place	1996 Atlanta	200 m breaststroke
Bronze medal – third place	2000 Sydney	100 m breaststroke
World Championships (SC)
Silver medal – second place	1999 Hong Kong	50 m breaststroke
Silver medal – second place	1999 Hong Kong	100 m breaststroke
Silver medal – second place	1999 Hong Kong	200 m breaststroke
Pan Pacific Championships
Gold medal – first place	1995 Atlanta	100 m breaststroke
Gold medal – first place	1999 Sydney	100 m breaststroke
Gold medal – first place	1999 Sydney	200 m breaststroke
Silver medal – second place	1995 Atlanta	200 m breaststroke
Silver medal – second place	1997 Fukuoka	100 m breaststroke
Commonwealth Games
Bronze medal – third place	1994 Victoria	100 m breaststroke
Goodwill Games
Gold medal – first place	1998 New York	100 m breaststroke
Gold medal – first place	1998 New York	200 m breaststroke
Summer Universiade
Gold medal – first place	1995 Fukuoka	100 m breaststroke
Gold medal – first place	1995 Fukuoka	200 m breaststroke
Silver medal – second place	1997 Catania	100 m breaststroke
All-Africa Games
Gold medal – first place	1995 Harare	100 m breaststroke
Gold medal – first place	1995 Harare	200 m breaststroke
Gold medal – first place	1995 Harare	4 x 100 m medley
Gold medal – first place	1999 Johannesburg	100 m breaststroke
Gold medal – first place	1999 Johannesburg	200 m breaststroke
Gold medal – first place	1999 Johannesburg	4 x 100 m medley

Penelope ("Penny") Heyns OIS (born 8 November 1974) is a South African former swimmer, who is best known for being the only woman in the history of the Olympic Games to have won both the 100 m and 200 m breaststroke events – at the 1996 Atlanta Olympic Games – making her South Africa's first post-apartheid Olympic gold medallist following South Africa's re-admission to the Games in 1992. Along with Australian champion Leisel Jones, Heyns is regarded as one of the greatest breaststroke swimmers.

== Sporting career ==
Heyns was the youngest member of the South African Olympic team at the 1992 Summer Olympics in Barcelona. She was also a member of the South African squad at the 1994 Commonwealth Games, where she won a bronze medal in the 200 m breaststroke event.

Heyns broke her first world record, the 100 m breaststroke, in Durban in March 1996. Heyns was again part of the South African Olympic team in Atlanta in 1996, where she won the gold medal for the 100 m breaststroke (also breaking the world record for the event) as well as the gold medal for the 200 m breaststroke (also breaking the Olympic record for the event). This made her the only woman in the history of the Olympic Games to have won both the 100 m and 200 m breaststroke events. During the 1998 Goodwill Games in New York, Heyns set the 50 m breaststroke world record. In 1999, Heyns set a spate of eleven world records in three months, swimming at events on three different continents. This made her the simultaneous holder of five out of the possible six breaststroke world records, a feat that had never been achieved before in the history of swimming.

Heyns was named by Swimming World magazine as the Female World Swimmer of the Year in 1996 and 1999. She was also a member of the South African Olympic team at the 2000 Olympic Games in Sydney. She won a bronze medal in the 100 m breaststroke.

Heyns retired from competitive swimming in 2001. In 2004 Heyns was an athlete's commission member of the International Swimming Federation (FINA). She is a businesswoman, motivational and public speaker, and television presenter. She has also completed an autobiography.

Heyns was voted 52nd in the Top 100 Great South Africans in 2004. She has an Olympic size swimming pool named after in the town of Sasolburg, Free State In 2024 Penny Heyns’ double gold win at Atlanta Olympics was judged as one of the top moments in South African women’s sport.

== See also ==
- List of members of the International Swimming Hall of Fame
- List of Olympic medalists in swimming (women)
- World record progression 50 metres breaststroke

Awards
Preceded by Krisztina Egerszegi	World Swimmer of the Year; 1996	Succeeded by Claudia Poll
Preceded by Jenny Thompson	World Swimmer of the Year; 1999	Succeeded by Inge de Bruijn
