= Ahmed Akram =

Egyptian swimmer (born 1996)

Personal information
- Full name: Ahmed Akram Mahmoud
- National team: Egypt
- Born: 20 October 1996 (age 29) Cairo, Egypt
- Height: 1.88 m (6 ft 2 in)
- Weight: 80 kg (180 lb)

Sport
- Sport: Swimming
- Strokes: freestyle, butterfly
- College team: University of South Carolina
Medal record
Men's swimming
Representing Egypt
All-Africa Games
| Gold medal – first place | 2015 Brazzaville | 400 m freestyle |
| Gold medal – first place | 2015 Brazzaville | 800 m freestyle |
| Gold medal – first place | 2015 Brazzaville | 1500 m freestyle |
| Gold medal – first place | 2015 Brazzaville | 200 m butterfly |
| Silver medal – second place | 2015 Brazzaville | 4×200 m freestyle |
Youth Olympic Games
| Gold medal – first place | 2014 Nanjing | 800 m freestyle |

Ahmed Akram Mahmoud (born 20 October 1996) is an Egyptian competitive swimmer who is an African and youth olympic champion as well as the Egyptian record holder in the 800 and 1500-metre freestyle and 200m butterfly. He finished fourth in the 1500-metre freestyle at the 2015 World Aquatics Championships. Ahmed placed 11th at the Rio Olympics in 2016 in the 1500-metre freestyle. He currently swims with club coach Matt Magee at ONEflow Aquatics in Neckarsulm, Germany.
