= Swimming at the 2015 African Games – 4×100 metre medley mixed =

Mixed 4×100 metre medley relay at the 2015 African Games
- Venue: Kintele Aquatic Complex
- Location: Brazzaville, Republic of the Congo
- Dates: 10 September 2015
- Competitors: 32 from 8 nations
- Winning time: 3:31.56

Medalists
gold medal	Mohamed Samy; Youssef El-Kamash; Farida Osman; Rowan El Badry	Egypt
silver medal	Jessica Ashley-Cooper; Alaric Basson; Nico Meyer; Karin Prinsloo	South Africa
bronze medal	Kirsty Coventry; James Lawson; Tarryn Rennie; Sean Gunn	Zimbabwe

The 4×100 metre medley mixed event at the 2015 African Games took place on 10 September 2015 at Kintele Aquatic Complex.

== Schedule ==
All times are Congo Standard Time (UTC+01:00)

Date	Time	Event
Thursday, 10 September 2015	19:10	Final

== Results ==
=== Final ===
Rank	Lane	Nation	Swimmers	Time	Notes
1st place, gold medalist(s)	5	Egypt (EGY)	Mohamed Samy (57.28); Youssef El-Kamash (1:02.67); Farida Osman (59.27); Rowan El Badry (56.82)	3:56.04	GR
2nd place, silver medalist(s)	4	South Africa (RSA)	Jessica Ashley-Cooper (1:03.79); Alaric Basson (1:03.04); Nico Meyer (54.63); Karin Prinsloo (54.81)	3:56.27	
3rd place, bronze medalist(s)	1	Zimbabwe (ZIM)	Kirsty Coventry (1:02.10); James Lawson (1:02.92); Tarryn Rennie (1:05.08); Sean Gunn (50.68)	4:00.78	
4	6	Tunisia (TUN)	Rim Ouennich (1:05.37); Wassim Elloumi (1:02.96); Asma Sammoud (1:03.60); Mohamed Mehdi Laagili (51.48)	4:03.41	
5	2	Algeria (ALG)	Riyad Djendouci (58.97); Abdelkader Afane (1:04.36); Hamida Rania Nefsi (1:05.52); Majda Chebaraka (59.24)	4:08.09	
6	3	Kenya (KEN)	Hamdan Bayusuf (1:00.91); Rebecca Kamau (1:12.38); Issa Abdellah (58.73); Sylvia Brunlehner (59.86)	4:11.88	
7	8	Nigeria (NGR)	Samson Opuakpo (1:02.39); Racheal Tonjor (1:22.32); Ifeakachukwu Nmor (57.16); Ifiezibe Gagbe (1:02.74)	4:24.61	
8	7	Mozambique (MOZ)	Igor Mogne (1:01.54); Valdo Lourecon (1:13.72); Gessica Stagno (1:07.26); Gisela Cossa (1:05.63)	4:28.15	
