= Swimming at the 2015 African Games – 4×100 metre freestyle mixed =

Mixed 4×100 metre freestyle relay at the 2015 African Games
- Venue: Kintele Aquatic Complex
- Location: Brazzaville, Republic of the Congo
- Dates: 7 September 2015
- Competitors: 32 from 8 nations
- Winning time: 3:31.56

Medalists
gold medal	Chad le Clos; Clayton Jimmie; Marlies Ross; Karin Prinsloo	South Africa
silver medal	Rowan El Badry; Mohammed Khaled; Farida Osman; Mohamed Samy	Egypt
bronze medal	Nazim Belkhodja; Souad Nafissa Cherouati; Badis Djendouci; Majda Chebaraka	Algeria

The 4×100 metre freestyle mixed event at the 2015 African Games took place on 7 September 2015 at Kintele Aquatic Complex.

== Schedule ==
All times are Congo Standard Time (UTC+01:00)

Date	Time	Event
Monday, 7 September 2015	18:46	Final

== Results ==
=== Final ===
Rank	Lane	Nation	Swimmers	Time	Notes
1st place, gold medalist(s)	4	South Africa (RSA)	Chad le Clos (48.50); Clayton Jimmie (50.22); Marlies Ross (57.10); Karin Prinsloo (55.74)	3:31.56	GR
2nd place, silver medalist(s)	5	Egypt (EGY)	Rowan El Badry (56.71); Mohammed Khaled (50.69); Farida Osman (55.69); Mohamed Samy (49.43)	3:32.52	
3rd place, bronze medalist(s)	6	Algeria (ALG)	Nazim Belkhodja (50.70); Souad Nafissa Cherouati (58.36); Badis Djendouci (52.25); Majda Chebaraka (59.62)	3:40.93	
4	3	Tunisia (TUN)	Farah Ben Khelil (59.24); Mohamed Ali Chaouachi (52.09); Rim Ouennich (58.38); Mohamed Mehdi Laagili (51.47)	3:41.18	
5	8	Zimbabwe (ZIM)	Peter Wetzlar (52.89); Tarryn Rennie (1:00.53); Kirsty Coventry (57.91); Sean Gunn (50.72)	3:42.05	NR
6	2	Mauritius (MRI)	Bradley Vincent (51.37); Olivia De Maroussem (1:01.31); Heather Arseth (58.35); Mathieu Marquet (51.86)	3:42.89	
7	1	Kenya (KEN)	Edward Ilako (54.99); Sylvia Brunlehner (59.67); Emily Muteti (1:01.80); Issa Abdellah (53.40)	3:49.86	
8	7	Mozambique (MOZ)	Igor Mogne (52.39); Denilson da Costa (55.09); Gessica Stagno (1:03.12); Gisela Cossa (1:05.33)	3:55.93	
