= Swimming at the 2015 African Games – Men's 100 metre freestyle =

Men's 100 metre freestyle at the 2015 African Games
- Venue: Kintele Aquatic Complex
- Date: September 8, 2015
- Competitors: 35 from 21 nations
- Winning time: 49.93

Medalists
| gold medal | Clayton Jimmie | South Africa |
| silver medal | Mohamed Samy | Egypt |
| bronze medal | Caydon Muller | South Africa |

The Men's 100 metre freestyle event at the 2015 African Games took place on 8 September 2015 at Kintele Aquatic Complex.

== Schedule ==
All times are Congo Standard Time (UTC+01:00)

| Date | Time | Event |
|---|---|---|
| Tuesday, 8 September 2015 | 10:00 | Heat 1 |
| Tuesday, 8 September 2015 | 10:03 | Heat 2 |
| Tuesday, 8 September 2015 | 10:06 | Heat 3 |
| Tuesday, 8 September 2015 | 10:09 | Heat 4 |
| Tuesday, 8 September 2015 | 10:12 | Heat 5 |
| Tuesday, 8 September 2015 | 17:15 | Final |

== Records ==
Prior to the competition, the existing world and championship records were as follows.

| | Name | Nation | Time | Location | Date |
|---|---|---|---|---|---|
| World record | César Cielo | Brazil | 46.91 | Rome | 30 July 2009 |
| African record | Lyndon Ferns | South Africa | 47.79 | Rome | 29 July 2009 |
| Games record | Salim Iles | Algeria | 49.38 | Algiers | 14 July 2007 |

== Results ==
=== Heats ===
The heats were held on 8 September.

| Rank | Heat | Lane | Name | Nationality | Time | Notes |
|---|---|---|---|---|---|---|
| 1 | 4 | 5 | Caydon Muller | South Africa | 49.93 | Q |
| 2 | 5 | 4 | Clayton Jimmie | South Africa | 50.29 | Q |
| 3 | 4 | 4 | Mohamed Samy | Egypt | 50.81 | Q |
| 4 | 3 | 4 | Bradley Vincent | Mauritius | 51.07 | Q |
| 5 | 3 | 5 | Nazim Belkhodja | Algeria | 51.45 | Q |
| 6 | 3 | 3 | Sean Gunn | Zimbabwe | 51.62 | Q |
| 7 | 5 | 5 | Adham Abdelmegid | Egypt | 51.64 | Q |
| 8 | 5 | 6 | Mohamed Lagili | Tunisia | 51.91 | Q |
| 9 | 4 | 6 | Mathieu Marquet | Mauritius | 52.07 | |
| 10 | 4 | 3 | Mohamed Ali Chaouachi | Tunisia | 52.14 | |
| 11 | 5 | 2 | Abdoul Niane | Senegal | 52.76 | |
| 12 | 5 | 3 | Badis Djendouci | Algeria | 53.02 | |
| 13 | 3 | 6 | Peter Wetzlar | Zimbabwe | 53.30 | |
| 14 | 4 | 1 | Samson Opuakpo | Nigeria | 54.23 | |
| 15 | 5 | 7 | Andre van der Merwe | Botswana | 55.12 | |
| 16 | 3 | 7 | Edward Ilako | Kenya | 55.35 | |
| 17 | 4 | 7 | Denilson da Costa | Mozambique | 55.44 | |
| 18 | 5 | 8 | Kwesi Abbiw Jackson | Ghana | 55.69 | |
| 19 | 5 | 1 | Adama Thiaw Ndir | Senegal | 55.75 | |
| 20 | 4 | 8 | Jörn Diekmann | Namibia | 56.31 | |
| 21 | 1 | 3 | Hilal Hemed Hilal | Tanzania | 56.46 | |
| 22 | 3 | 1 | Emidio Cuna | Mozambique | 56.61 | |
| 23 | 2 | 5 | Emile Bakale | Republic of the Congo | 58.33 | |
| 24 | 2 | 4 | Mamadou Soumaré | Mali | 58.41 | |
| 25 | 1 | 5 | Ammaar Ghadiyali | Tanzania | 58.50 | |
| 26 | 3 | 8 | Michael Botha | Botswana | 58.67 | |
| 27 | 2 | 3 | Dawit Mengistu | Ethiopia | 1:01.36 | |
| 28 | 2 | 6 | Yousif Bashir Ibrahim | Sudan | 1:05.70 | |
| 29 | 2 | 1 | Oumar Kaba | Guinea | 1:08.79 | |
| 30 | 2 | 2 | Anauskajynior Ndinga | Republic of the Congo | 1:09.11 | |
| 31 | 2 | 8 | Mubikayi Sokomai | Democratic Republic of the Congo | 1:09.19 | |
| | | | Richard Asante Yeboah | Ghana | Disqualified | |
| | | | Gamba Banga | Democratic Republic of the Congo | Disqualified | |
| | | | Thibaut Amani Danho | Ivory Coast | Did not start | |
| | | | Issa Abdellah | Kenya | Did not start | |

=== Final ===
The final were held on 8 September.

| Rank | Lane | Name | Nationality | Time | Notes |
|---|---|---|---|---|---|
| 1st place, gold medalist(s) | 5 | Clayton Jimmie | South Africa | 49.93 | |
| 2nd place, silver medalist(s) | 3 | Mohamed Samy | Egypt | 49.97 | |
| 3rd place, bronze medalist(s) | 4 | Caydon Muller | South Africa | 50.28 | |
| 4 | 6 | Bradley Vincent | Mauritius | 50.39 | |
| 5 | 7 | Sean Gunn | Zimbabwe | 51.14 | |
| 6 | 2 | Nazim Belkhodja | Algeria | 51.23 | |
| 7 | 1 | Adham Abdelmegid | Egypt | 51.63 | |
| 8 | 8 | Mohamed Lagili | Tunisia | 52.12 | |
