= Swimming at the 2015 African Games – Women's 100 metre freestyle =

Women's swimming competition

Women's 100 metre freestyle at the 2015 African Games
- Venue: Kintele Aquatic Complex
- Date: September 6, 2015
- Competitors: 15 from 12 nations

Medalists
gold medal	Farida Osman	Egypt
silver medal	Karin Prinsloo	South Africa
bronze medal	Rwan El Badry	Egypt

The women's 100 metre freestyle event at the 2015 African Games took place on 6 September 2015 at Kintele Aquatic Complex.

== Schedule ==
All times are Congo Standard Time (UTC+01:00)

Date	Time	Event
Sunday, 6 September 2015	10:00	Heats
Sunday, 6 September 2015	17:00	Final

== Records ==
Prior to the competition, the existing world and championship records were as follows.

	Name	Nation	Time	Location	Date
World record	Britta Steffen	Germany	52.07	Rome	31 July 2009
African record	Karin Prinsloo	South Africa	54.48	Durban	9 April 2014
Games record	Karin Prinsloo	South Africa	56.05	Maputo	5 September 2011

The following new records were set during this competition.

Date	Event	Name	Nation	Time	Record
6 September	Heats	Karin Prinsloo	South Africa	55.86	GR
6 September	Final	Farida Osman	Egypt	55.41	GR

== Results ==
=== Heats ===
The heats were held on 6 September.

Rank	Heat	Athlete	Time	Notes
1	2	Karin Prinsloo (RSA)	55.86	Q
2	1	Farida Osman (EGY)	56.91	Q
3	2	Rwan El Badry (EGY)	57.11	Q
4	2	Marlies Ross (RSA)	57.66	Q
5	2	Majda Chebaraka (ALG)	58.59	Q
6	2	Naomi Ruele (BOT)	59.12	Q
7	1	Farah Ben Khelil (TUN)	59.75	Q
8	1	Sylvia Brunlehner (KEN)	59.84	Q
9	1	Heather Arseth (MRI)	1:00.13	
10	2	Tarryn Rennie (ZIM)	1:00.49	
11	1	Emily Muteti (KEN)	1:00.58	
12	2	Ifiezibe Gagbe (NGR)	1:01.90	
13	1	Ana Nobrega (ANG)	1:02.17	
14	1	Christa Kaimansa Sowah (GHA)	1:07.97	
15	2	Stefan Bellore Sangala (CGO)	1:19.10	

=== Final ===
The final were held on 6 September.

Rank	Athlete	Time	Notes
1st place, gold medalist(s)	Farida Osman (EGY)	55.41	GR, NR
2nd place, silver medalist(s)	Karin Prinsloo (RSA)	55.69	
3rd place, bronze medalist(s)	Rwan El Badry (EGY)	57.03	
4	Majda Chebaraka (ALG)	57.94	
4	Marlies Ross (RSA)	57.94	
6	Farah Ben Khelil (TUN)	59.51	
7	Sylvia Brunlehner (KEN)	59.72	
8	Tarryn Rennie (ZIM)	1:00.81	
