= Swimming at the 2015 African Games – Women's 4×100 metre freestyle relay =

Women's 4×100 metre freestyle relay at the 2015 African Games
- Venue: Kintele Aquatic Complex
- Date: September 8, 2015
- Competitors: 20 from 5 nations

Medalists
gold medal	Marlies Ross, Jessica Ashley Cooper, Vannessa Mohr, Karin Prinsloo	South Africa
silver medal	Rowan El Badry, Salma Saber, Maii Atif, Farida Osman	Egypt
bronze medal	Rim Ouennich, Farah Ben Khelil, Asma Ben Boukhatem, Asma Sammoud	Tunisia

The women's 4×100 metre freestyle relay event at the 2015 African Games took place on 8 September 2015 at Kintele Aquatic Complex.

== Schedule ==
All times are Congo Standard Time (UTC+01:00)

Date	Time	Event
Tuesday, 8 September 2015	18:13	Final

== Results ==
=== Final ===
Rank	Team	Time	Notes
1st place, gold medalist(s)	South Africa (RSA)	3:49.04	GR
	Marlies Ross	57.91	
	Jessica Ashley Cooper	57.14	
	Vannessa Mohr	58.50	
	Karin Prinsloo	55.49	
2nd place, silver medalist(s)	Egypt (EGY)	3:50.30	NR
	Rowan El Badry	56.71	
	Salma Saber	58.43	
	Maii Atif	1:00.13	
	Farida Osman	55.03	
3rd place, bronze medalist(s)	Tunisia (TUN)	3:59.55	
	Rim Ouennich	59.61	
	Farah Ben Khelil	59.69	
	Asma Ben Boukhatem	1:01.15	
	Asma Sammoud	59.10	
4	Algeria (ALG)	4:01.26	
	Majda Chebaraka	59.69	
	Souad Nafissa Cherouati	59.45	
	Hamida Rania Nefsi	1:00.89	
	Hannah Taleb Bendiab	1:01.23	
5	Kenya (KEN)	4:02.64	
	Emily Muteti	1:01.13	
	Sylvia Brunlehner	1:00.60	
	Talisa Lanoe	1:02.30	
	Rebecca Kamau	58.61	
6	Mozambique (MOZ)	NP	
	—		
	—		
	—		
	—		
