= Swimming at the 2015 African Games – Men's 50 metre freestyle =

Men's 50 metre freestyle at the 2015 African Games
- Venue: Kintele Aquatic Complex
- Date: September 11, 2015
- Competitors: 46 from 25 nations
- Winning time: 22.61

Medalists
gold medal	Douglas Erasmus	South Africa
silver medal	Mazen Elkamash	Egypt
bronze medal	Clayton Jimmie	South Africa

The Men's 50 metre freestyle event at the 2015 African Games took place on 11 September 2015 at Kintele Aquatic Complex.

== Schedule ==
All times are Congo Standard Time (UTC+01:00)

Date	Time	Event
Friday, 11 September 2015	10:10	Heat 1
Friday, 11 September 2015	10:12	Heat 2
Friday, 11 September 2015	10:14	Heat 3
Friday, 11 September 2015	10:16	Heat 4
Friday, 11 September 2015	10:18	Heat 5
Friday, 11 September 2015	10:20	Heat 6
Friday, 11 September 2015	17:15	Final

== Records ==
Prior to the competition, the existing world and championship records were as follows.

	Name	Nation	Time	Location	Date
World record	César Cielo	Brazil	20.91	São Paulo	18 December 2009
African record	Roland Schoeman	South Africa	21.67	Beijing	16 August 2008
African record	Roland Schoeman	South Africa	21.67	Barcelona	2 August 2013
Games record	Salim Iles; Gideon Louw	Algeria; South Africa	22.34; 22.34	Algiers; Maputo	17 July 2007; 10 September 2011

== Results ==
=== Heats ===
The heats were held on 11 September.

Rank	Heat	Lane	Name	Nationality	Time	Notes
1	5	4	Douglas Erasmus	South Africa	22.67	Q
2	5	5	Mazen Elkamash	Egypt	23.13	Q
3	6	5	Clayton Jimmie	South Africa	23.15	Q
4	4	5	Bradley Vincent	Mauritius	23.29	Q
5	5	3	Sean Gunn	Zimbabwe	23.56	Q
6	4	4	Nazim Belkhodja	Algeria	23.64	Q
7	6	4	Adham Abdelmegid	Egypt	23.97	Q
8	5	7	Mathieu Marquet	Mauritius	23.98	Q
9	6	3	Abdoul Niane	Senegal	24.04	
10	4	2	Edward Ilako	Kenya	24.09	
10	4	7	Thibaut Amani Danho	Ivory Coast	24.09	
12	5	6	Peter Wetzlar	Zimbabwe	24.17	
13	4	6	Issa Abdellah	Kenya	24.35	
14	6	1	Ifeakachukwu Nmor	Nigeria	24.50	
15	6	7	Denilson da Costa	Mozambique	24.75	
16	6	2	Samson Opuakpo	Nigeria	24.76	
17	6	6	Mohamed Lagili	Tunisia	24.80	
18	4	3	Mohamed Ali Chaouachi	Tunisia	24.83	
19	5	2	Adama Thiaw Ndir	Senegal	24.96	
20	1	4	Hilal Hemed Hilal	Tanzania	25.15	
21	5	8	Andre van der Merwe	Botswana	25.27	
22	4	1	Kwesi Abbiw Jackson	Ghana	25.28	
23	5	1	Emidio Cuna	Mozambique	25.48	
24	6	8	Emile Bakale	Republic of the Congo	26.18	
25	3	4	Mamadou Soumaré	Mali	26.39	
26	3	5	Michael Botha	Botswana	26.43	
27	4	8	Matthew Shone	Zambia	26.53	
28	3	6	Jörn Diekmann	Namibia	26.55	
29	1	3	Ammaar Ghadiyali	Tanzania	26.68	
30	3	3	Ismah Serunjoji	Uganda	27.06	
31	1	6	Osman Kamara	Sierra Leone	27.39	
32	3	7	Eméric Kpegba	Togo	27.76	
33	2	3	Richard Asante Yeboah	Ghana	27.83	
34	3	8	Dawit Mengistu	Ethiopia	27.97	
35	3	1	Dienov Andres Koka	Republic of the Congo	28.46	
36	1	2	Moris Beals	Sierra Leone	28.54	
37	1	7	Juan Daniel Nzo Ekang	Equatorial Guinea	28.78	
38	2	4	Yousif Bashir Ibrahim	Sudan	29.08	
39	3	2	Ahmed Izzeldin Salih	Sudan	29.68	
40	2	2	Franck Enyanga-Mokomo	Democratic Republic of the Congo	29.76	
41	2	5	Emmanuel Thompson	Ghana	30.20	
42	2	6	Ali Saleh Abdoulkader	Djibouti	31.16	
43	2	1	Gamba Banga	Democratic Republic of the Congo	31.62	
44	2	7	Houssein Gaber Ibrahim	Djibouti	31.73	
45	1	1	Sergio Mba Ayecaba	Equatorial Guinea	32.27	
	2	8	Mubikayi Sokomai	Democratic Republic of the Congo	Did not start	

=== Final ===
The final were held on 11 September.

Rank	Lane	Name	Nationality	Time	Notes
1st place, gold medalist(s)	4	Douglas Erasmus	South Africa	22.61	
2nd place, silver medalist(s)	5	Mazen Elkamash	Egypt	22.97	
3rd place, bronze medalist(s)	3	Clayton Jimmie	South Africa	22.98	
4	6	Bradley Vincent	Mauritius	23.07	
5	2	Sean Gunn	Zimbabwe	23.29	
6	1	Adham Abdelmegid	Egypt	23.46	
7	7	Nazim Belkhodja	Algeria	23.54	
8	8	Mathieu Marquet	Mauritius	23.92	
