= Swimming at the 2015 African Games – Women's 50 metre freestyle =

Women's 50 metre freestyle at the 2015 African Games
- Venue: Kintele Aquatic Complex
- Date: September 10, 2015
- Competitors: 25 from 20 nations

Medalists
gold medal	Farida Osman	Egypt
silver medal	Karin Prinsloo	South Africa
bronze medal	Rwan El Badry	Egypt

The women's 50 metre freestyle event at the 2015 African Games took place on 10 September 2015 at Kintele Aquatic Complex.

== Schedule ==
All times are Congo Standard Time (UTC+01:00)

Date	Time	Event
Thursday, 10 September 2015	10:25	Heat 1
Thursday, 10 September 2015	10:27	Heat 2
Thursday, 10 September 2015	10:29	Heat 3
Thursday, 10 September 2015	18:08	Final

== Results ==
=== Heats ===
The heats were held on 10 September.

Rank	Heat	Athlete	Time	Notes
1	3	Farida Osman (EGY)	25.49	Q GR
2	2	Karin Prinsloo (RSA)	25.90	Q
3	3	Rowan El Badry (EGY)	26.10	Q
4	2	Alexus Laird (SEY)	26.87	Q
5	1	Sylvia Brunlehner (KEN)	26.77	Q
6	3	Rim Ouennich (TUN)	26.93	Q
7	2	Naomi Ruele (BOT)	27.14	Q
8	2	Tarryn Rennie (ZIM)	27.52	Q
9	1	Farah Ben Khelil (TUN)	27.53	
10	2	Emily Muteti (KEN)	27.59	
11	1	Ifiezibe Gagbe (NGR)	28.22	
12	3	Ana Nobrega (ANG)	28.93	
13	2	Christa Kaimansa Sowah (GHA)	30.28	
14	3	Avice Meya (UGA)	31.65	
15	3	Rahel Gebresilassie (ETH)	32.11	NR
16	1	Stefan Bellore Sangala (CGO)	32.62	
17	2	Adzo Kpossi (TOG)	33.62	
18	1	Pilar Ndong Mangue (GEQ)	38.22	
19	2	Natasha Emefa Addah (GHA)	39.09	
20	1	Mariama Dioulde Sow (GUI)	43.44	
21	3	Safia Houssein Barkat (DJI)	43.55	
22	1	Jalloh Bunturabie (SLE)	51.56	
23	1	Olivia De Maroussen (MRI)	NP	
24	1	Fatoumata Samassekou (MLI)	NP	
25	3	Vanessa Mohr (RSA)	NP	

=== Final ===
The final were held on 10 September.

Rank	Athlete	Time	Notes
1st place, gold medalist(s)	Farida Osman (EGY)	25.12	
2nd place, silver medalist(s)	Karin Prinsloo (RSA)	25.79	
3rd place, bronze medalist(s)	Rwan El Badry (EGY)	26.04	
4	Alexus Laird (SEY)	26.47	
5	Rim Ouennich (TUN)	26.91	
6	Sylvia Brunlehner (KEN)	26.92	
7	Naomi Ruele (BOT)	27.01	NR
8	Tarryn Rennie (ZIM)	27.71	
