= Swimming at the 2015 African Games – Men's 50 metre backstroke =

Men's 50 metre backstroke at the 2015 African Games
- Venue: Kintele Aquatic Complex
- Date: September 6, 2015
- Competitors: 19 from 12 nations
- Winning time: 25.71

Medalists
gold medal	Mohamed Samy	Egypt
silver medal	Richard Ellis	South Africa
bronze medal	Mohamed Khaled	Egypt

The Men's 50 metre backstroke event at the 2015 African Games took place on 6 September 2015 at Kintele Aquatic Complex.

== Schedule ==
All times are Congo Standard Time (UTC+01:00)

Date	Time	Event
Sunday, 6 September 2015	10:30	Heat 1
Sunday, 6 September 2015	10:32	Heat 2
Sunday, 6 September 2015	10:34	Heat 3
Sunday, 6 September 2015	17:47	Final

== Records ==
Prior to the competition, the existing world and championship records were as follows.

	Name	Nation	Time	Location	Date
World record	Liam Tancock	United Kingdom	24.04	Rome	2 August 2009
African record	Gerhard Zandberg	South Africa	24.34	Rome	2 August 2009
Games record	Gerhard Zandberg	South Africa	25.68	Algiers	16 July 2007

== Results ==
=== Heats ===
The heats were held on 6 September.

Rank	Heat	Lane	Name	Nationality	Time	Notes
1	2	4	Mohamed Samy	Egypt	26.43	Q
2	3	4	Richard Ellis	South Africa	26.54	Q
3	2	5	David De Villiers	South Africa	26.58	Q
4	3	5	Mohamed Khaled	Egypt	26.71	Q
5	2	3	Hamdan Bayusuf	Kenya	27.39	Q
6	1	4	Riyad Djendouci	Algeria	27.76	Q
7	1	5	Peter Wetzlar	Zimbabwe	28.24	Q
8	3	6	Mohamed Ali Chaouachi	Tunisia	28.56	Q
9	1	6	Samson Opuakpo	Nigeria	28.91	
10	1	2	Kimani Maina	Kenya	29.01	
11	1	3	Mohamed Lagili	Tunisia	29.03	
12	3	2	Denilson da Costa	Mozambique	29.29	
13	3	3	Sean Gunn	Zimbabwe	29.34	
14	2	6	Emile Bakale	Republic of the Congo	29.48	
15	2	2	Matar Samb	Senegal	30.21	
16	3	7	Adama Ndir	Senegal	30.40	
17	1	7	Yousif Bashir Ibrahim	Sudan	35.83	
18	3	1	Moris Beals	Sierra Leone	37.47	
19	2	7	Ahmed Izzeldin Salih	Sudan	38.49	

=== Final ===
The final were held on 6 September.

Rank	Lane	Name	Nationality	Time	Notes
1st place, gold medalist(s)	4	Mohamed Samy	Egypt	25.71	
2nd place, silver medalist(s)	5	Richard Ellis	South Africa	25.89	
3rd place, bronze medalist(s)	6	Mohamed Khaled	Egypt	26.16	
4	3	David De Villiers	South Africa	26.52	
5	2	Hamdan Bayusuf	Kenya	27.21	
6	7	Riyad Djendouci	Algeria	27.35	
7	1	Peter Wetzlar	Zimbabwe	27.68	
8	8	Mohamed Ali Chaouachi	Tunisia	28.14	
