= Swimming at the 2015 African Games – Women's 200 metre freestyle =

Women's 200 metre freestyle at the 2015 African Games
- Venue: Kintele Aquatic Complex
- Date: September 7, 2015
- Competitors: 11 from 7 nations

Medalists
| gold medal | Karin Prinsloo | South Africa |
| silver medal | Marlies Ross | South Africa |
| bronze medal | Majda Chebaraka | Algeria |

The women's 200 metre freestyle event at the 2015 African Games took place on 7 September 2015 at Kintele Aquatic Complex.

== Schedule ==
All times are Congo Standard Time (UTC+01:00)

| Date | Time | Event |
|---|---|---|
| Monday, 7 September 2015 | 10:08 | Heat 1 |
| Monday, 7 September 2015 | 10:12 | Heat 2 |
| Monday, 7 September 2015 | 17:17 | Final |

== Results ==
=== Heats ===
| Rank | Heat | Athlete | Time | Notes |
|---|---|---|---|---|
| 1 | 2 | Karin Prinsloo (RSA) | 2:01.76 | Q |
| 2 | 1 | Marlies Ross (RSA) | 2:05.20 | Q |
| 3 | 1 | Rwan Elbadry (EGY) | 2:05.59 | Q |
| 4 | 2 | Majda Chebaraka (ALG) | 2:07.70 | Q |
| 5 | 2 | Rim Ouennich (TUN) | 2:07.94 | Q |
| 6 | 2 | Rebecca Kamau (KEN) | 2:08.23 | Q |
| 7 | 1 | Salma Saber (EGY) | 2:09.48 | Q |
| 8 | 2 | Talita Marie Te Flan (CIV) | 2:11.48 | Q |
| 9 | 2 | Farah Ben Khelil (TUN) | 2:14.13 | |
| 10 | 1 | Olivia De Maroussen (MRI) | NS | |
| 11 | 1 | Rania Hamida Nefsi (ALG) | NS | |

=== Final ===
| Rank | Athlete | Time | Notes |
|---|---|---|---|
| 1st place, gold medalist(s) | Karin Prinsloo (RSA) | 2:00.14 | |
| 2nd place, silver medalist(s) | Marlies Ross (RSA) | 2:02.61 | |
| 3rd place, bronze medalist(s) | Majda Chebaraka (ALG) | 2:02.63 | |
| 4 | Rwan Elbadry (EGY) | 2:05.03 | |
| 5 | Rebecca Kamau (KEN) | 2:07.03 | |
| 6 | Rim Ouennich (TUN) | 2:07.07 | |
| 7 | Salma Saber (EGY) | 2:08.44 | |
| 8 | Talita Marie Te Flan (CIV) | 2:10.69 | |
