= Swimming at the 2015 African Games – Women's 200 metre Individual medley =

Women's 200 metre Individual medley at the 2015 African Games
- Venue: Kintele Aquatic Complex
- Date: September 10, 2015
- Competitors: 13 from 9 nations

Medalists
gold medal	Kirsty Coventry	Zimbabwe
silver medal	Marlies Ross	South Africa
bronze medal	Rene Warnes	South Africa

The women's 200 metre Individual medley event at the 2015 African Games took place on 10 September 2015 at Kintele Aquatic Complex.

== Schedule ==
All times are Congo Standard Time (UTC+01:00)

Date	Time	Event
Thursday, 10 September 2015	10:09	Heat 1
Thursday, 10 September 2015	10:13	Heat 2
Thursday, 10 September 2015	17:46	Final

== Results ==
=== Heats ===
Rank	Heat	Athlete	Time	Notes
1	2	Kirsty Coventry (ZIM)	2:18.64	Q
2	2	Rene Warnes (RSA)	2:19.80	Q
3	1	Marlies Ross (RSA)	2:20.74	Q
4	1	Rebecca Kamau (KEN)	2:22.73	Q
5	1	Yara Emad (EGY)	2:23.52	Q
6	1	Souad Nafissa Cherouati (ALG)	2:24.48	Q
7	2	Rwioda Heshem (EGY)	2:25.05	Q
8	1	Asma Sammoud (TUN)	2:25.11	Q
9	2	Hamida Rania Nefsi (ALG)	2:26.84	
10	2	Farah Ben Khelil (TUN)	2:27.46	
11	2	Tessa Ip Hen Chung (MRI)	2:35.39	
12	1	Gisela Cossa (MOZ)	2:51.70	
13	2	Shannon Hassen (ZAM)	NP	

=== Final ===
Rank	Athlete	Time	Notes
1st place, gold medalist(s)	Kirsty Coventry (ZIM)	2:16.05	
2nd place, silver medalist(s)	Marlies Ross (RSA)	2:17.57	
3rd place, bronze medalist(s)	Rene Warnes (RSA)	2:18.98	
4	Rwioda Heshem (EGY)	2:19.76	
5	Rebecca Kamau (KEN)	2:20.40	
6	Yara Emad (EGY)	2:21.97	
7	Souad Nafissa Cherouati (ALG)	2:23.15	
8	Asma Sammoud (TUN)	2:25.04	
