= Algeria at the 2015 African Games =

- IOC code: ALG
- NOC: Algerian Olympic Committee
- Website: COA.dz
- Competitors: 235 in 18 sports
- Medals Ranked 4th: Gold 40 Silver 42 Bronze 36 Total 118

African Games appearances (overview)
- 1965; 1973; 1978; 1987; 1991; 1995; 1999; 2003; 2007; 2011; 2015; 2019; 2023

Algeria, participated at the 2015 African Games held in the city of Brazzaville, Republic of the Congo. It participated with 235 athletes in 18 sports.

== Medal summary ==
=== Medal table ===
Medal	Name	Sport	Event	Date
Gold	Mohamed Bourguieg; Hillal Metidji; Ahmed Anes Maoudj; Mohamed Aouicha; Mohamed Reghib	Gymnastics	Men's Team All-Around	5 September
Gold	Farah Boufadene	Gymnastics	Women's vault	6 September
Gold	Farah Boufadene	Gymnastics	Women's uneven bars	6 September
Gold	Mohamed Aouicha	Gymnastics	Men's pommel horse	6 September
Gold	Rania Hamida Nefsi	Swimming	Women's 400m Medley	6 September
Gold	Kamilia Manal Hadj Said	Karate	Women's Kata	7 September
Gold	Lydia Besebs	Karate	Women's Individual Kumite -50 kg	7 September
Gold	Abdelatif Benkhaled	Karate	Men's Individual Kumite -67 kg	7 September
Gold	Mohamed Bourguieg	Gymnastics	Men's vault	7 September
Gold	Mohamed Reghib	Gymnastics	Men's horizontal bar	7 September
Gold	Siham Mansouri	Gymnastics	Women's Individual	7 September
Gold	Siham Mansouri; Sofiane Sahraoui	Gymnastics	Mixed Pairs	7 September
Gold	Lamya Matoub	Karate	Women's Individual Kumite -68 kg	8 September
Gold	Kamilia Manal Hadj Said; Selma Bedja; Yamina Belabès	Karate	Women's Kata team	8 September
Gold	Majda Chebaraka	Swimming	Women's 800m freestyle	9 September
Gold	Lamya Matoub; Lydia Besbes; Saida Djedra	Karate	Women's Team Kumite	9 September
Gold	Majda Chebaraka	Swimming	Women's 1500m freestyle	11 September
Gold	Mohamed Flissi	Boxing	Men's 52 kg	12 September
Gold	Réda Benbaaziz	Boxing	Men's 60 kg	12 September
Gold	Souhila Bouchene	Boxing	Women's -51 kg	12 September
Gold	Abdelkader Chadi	Boxing	Men's -64 kg	12 September
Gold	Abdelhafid Benchebla	Boxing	Men's -81 kg	12 September
Gold	Sabrina Saidi	Judo	Women's -48 kg	13 September
Gold	Djazia Haddad	Judo	Women's -52 kg	13 September
Gold	Houd Zourdani	Judo	Men's -66 kg	13 September
Gold	Ratiba Tariket	Judo	Women's -57 kg	13 September
Gold	Kaouthar Ouallal	Judo	Women's -78 kg	14 September
Gold	Lyes Bouyacoub	Judo	Men's -100 kg	14 September
Gold	Abderrahmane Benamadi	Judo	Men's -90 kg	14 September
Gold	Algeria men's national volleyball team	Volleyball	Men's tournament	14 September
Gold	Abdelmalik Lahoulou	Athletics	Men's 400 m hurdles	16 September
Gold	Hichem Khalil Cherabi	Athletics	Men's Pole Vault	16 September
Gold	Abdennour Laaouni	Wrestling	Men's 59 kg	16 September
Gold	Tarek Benaissa	Wrestling	Men's 66 kg	16 September
Gold	Adem Boudjemline	Wrestling	Men's 85 kg	16 September
Gold	Romain Trolliet	Taekwondo	Men's 58 kg	17 September
Gold	Zouheir Iftene	Wrestling	Men's 65 kg	18 September
Silver	Roman Djitli	Fencing	Men's Individual Foil	3 September
Silver	Narimene Elhaouari; Anissa Khelfaoui; Louiza Khelfaoui; Khadidja Zerabib	Fencing	Women's Team Foil	5 September
Silver	Mohamed Bourguieg	Gymnastics	Men's Individual All-Around	5 September
Silver	Sonia Abdiche; Sarah Atrouz; Abik Boungab; Amira Hayet Sabah El Hafaia	Fencing	Women's Team Sabre	6 September
Silver	Souad Nafissa Cherouati	Swimming	Women's 400m Medley	6 September
Silver	Mouad Outis	Karate	Men's Kata	7 September
Silver	Abdelkrim Bouamria	Karate	Men's Individual Kumite -60 kg	7 September
Silver	Ahmed Anes Maoudj	Gymnastics	Men's vault	7 September
Silver	Hillal Metidji	Gymnastics	Men's parallel bar	7 September
Silver	Sourour Mediouni; Cheyma Said Saoud; Siham Mansouri	Gymnastics	Women's Mixed Trio	7 September
Silver	Majda Chebaraka	Swimming	Women's 400m Freestyle	8 September
Silver	[[ ]] [[ ]] [[ ]]	Karate	Men's Kata Team	8 September
Silver	Imène Atif	Karate	Women's Individual Kumite +68 kg	8 September
Silver	Saida Djebra	Karate	Women's Individual Kumite −61 kg	8 September
Silver	Mouad Achache	Karate	Men's Individual Kumite −84 kg	8 September
Silver	Amor Fenni	Weightlifting	Men's Snatch 56 kg	8 September
Silver	Youcef Hassani; Mouad Achache; Abdelatif Benkhaled; Samy Brahimi; Walid Bouaboub	Karate	Men's Team Kumite	9 September
Silver	Abderrahmane Mansouri; Adil Barbari; Abderrahmane Bechlagheme; Nassim Saidi	Cycling	Men's Team time trials	10 September
Silver	Messaoud Seddam	Weightlifting	Men's Snatch 94 kg	11 September
Silver	Messaoud Seddam	Weightlifting	Men's Clean & Jerk 94 kg	11 September
Silver	Messaoud Seddam	Weightlifting	Men's Total 94 kg	11 September
Silver	Khalil Litim	Boxing	Men's 56 kg	12 September
Silver	Kamel Haroune	Judo	Men's -60 kg	13 September
Silver	Souad Belakhal	Judo	Women's -63 kg	13 September
Silver	Lyes Mokdell	Athletics	Men's 110 m hurdles	14 September
Silver	Sonia Asselah	Judo	Women's +78 kg	14 September
Silver	Bilal Zouani	Judo	Men's +100 kg	14 September
Silver	Miloud Rahmani	Athletics	Men's 400 m hurdles	16 September
Silver	Taoufik Makhloufi	Athletics	Men's 800 m	16 September
Silver	Hamza Haloui	Wrestling	Men's 98 kg	16 September
Silver	Hichem Bourmel	Wrestling	Men's 75 kg	16 September
Silver	Bachir Sidazara	Wrestling	Men's 80 kg	16 September
Silver	Hamza Moussaoui	Wrestling	Men's 74 kg	18 September
Silver	Abderahim Sayeh	Wrestling	Men's 61 kg	18 September
Bronze	Anissa Khelfaoui	Fencing	Women's Individual Foil	3 September
Bronze	Farah Boufadene	Gymnastics	Women's Individual all-around	5 September
Bronze	Rania Ben Ali Khodja; Farah Boufadene; Nesrine Negroune; Ahlem Mokhtari	Gymnastics	Women's Team all-around	5 September
Bronze	Mohamed Metidji	Gymnastics	Men's Individual All-Around	5 September
Bronze	Roman Djilti; Salim Heroui; Yanis Baptiste Mabed; Youcef Madi	Fencing	Men's Team Foil	6 September
Bronze	Hillal Metidji	Gymnastics	Men's pommel horse	6 September
Bronze	Hannah Taleb Bendiab; Majda Chebaraka; Rania Hamida Nefsi; Souad Nafissa Cherouati	Swimming	Women's 4 × 200 m freestyle relay	6 September
Bronze	Majda Chebaraka	Swimming	Women's 200m freestyle	7 September
Bronze	Rania Hamida Nefsi; Majda Chebaraka; Nazim Belkhodja; Badis Djendouci	Swimming	4 × 100 m freestyle mixed	7 September
Bronze	Mohamed Aouicha	Gymnastics	Men's horizontal bar	7 September
Bronze	Farah Boufadene	Gymnastics	Women's balance beam	7 September
Bronze	Saoud Cheyma Said	Gymnastics	Women's Individual	7 September
Bronze	Sofiane Sahraoui	Gymnastics	Men's Individual	7 September
Bronze	Badis Djendouci; Nazim Belkhodja; Riyad Djendouci; Lies Abdelghani Nefsi	Swimming	Men's 4 × 100 m freestyle relay	9 September
Bronze	Mohamed Sif Islam Belhouchet; Fayçal Oughlissi; Ahmed Ziadi	Pétanque	Men's three-member team	9 September
Bronze	Hossain Fardjallah	Weightlifting	Men's Snatch 85 kg	10 September
Bronze	Adil Barbari	Cycling	Men's time trial	11 September
Bronze	Souad Nafissa Cherouati	Swimming	Women's 1500m freestyle	11 September
Bronze	Ilham Mekhaled	Boxing	Women's -60 kg	11 September
Bronze	Mohamed Grimes	Boxing	Men's +91 kg	11 September
Bronze	Hamza Sanoun	Weightlifting	Men's Snatch +105 kg	11 September
Bronze	Adil Barbari	Cycling	Men's road race	13 September
Bronze	Aicha Ben Abderahmane	Judo	Women's -70 kg	14 September
Bronze	Salim Keddar	Athletics	Men's 1500 m	14 September
Bronze	Romaissa Tahani Belabiod	Athletics	Women's Long Jump	16 September
Bronze	Akrem Boudjemline	Wrestling	Men's 71 kg	16 September
Bronze	Abdelmalik Lahoulou; Miloud Rahmani; Sofiane Bouhadda; Miloud Laradt	Athletics	Men's 4 x 400 Relay	17 September
Bronze	Lynda Azzedine	Taekwondo	Women's 58 kg	17 September
Bronze	Mohamed Boudaraa	Wrestling	Men's 70 kg	18 September
Bronze	Abdelhak Kharbechi	Wrestling	Men's 57 kg	18 September

Medals by sport
Sport	1st place, gold medalist(s)	2nd place, silver medalist(s)	3rd place, bronze medalist(s)	Total
Gymnastics	8	4	8	20
Judo	7	4	1	12
Karate	6	7	0	13
Boxing	5	1	2	8
Wrestling	4	5	3	12
Para-athletics	3	6	3	12
Swimming	3	2	5	10
Athletics	2	3	3	8
Taekwondo	1	0	1	2
Volleyball	1	0	0	1
Weightlifting	0	4	2	6
Fencing	0	3	2	5
Cycling	0	1	2	3
Powerlifting	0	1	2	3
Petanque	0	0	1	1
Total	40	42	36	118

Medals by date
Day	Date	1st place, gold medalist(s)	2nd place, silver medalist(s)	3rd place, bronze medalist(s)	Total
1	3 September	0	1	1	2
2	4 September	0	0	0	0
3	5 September	1	2	3	6
4	6 September	4	2	3	9
5	7 September	7	5	6	18
6	8 September	2	6	0	8
7	9 September	2	1	2	5
8	10 September	0	1	1	2
9	11 September	1	3	5	9
10	12 September	5	2	2	9
11	13 September	4	2	1	7
12	14 September	4	3	2	9
13	15 September	1	0	1	2
14	16 September	5	7	3	15
15	17 September	3	4	2	9
16	18 September	1	2	2	5
Total		40	42	36	118

Medals by gender
Gender	1st place, gold medalist(s)	2nd place, silver medalist(s)	3rd place, bronze medalist(s)	Total
Male	21	30	21	72
Female	18	12	14	44
Mixed	1	0	1	2
Total	40	42	36	118

Multiple medalists
Name	Sport	1st place, gold medalist(s)	2nd place, silver medalist(s)	3rd place, bronze medalist(s)	Total
Majda Chebaraka	Swimming	2	1	3	6
Farah Boufadene	Gymnastics	2	0	3	5
Mohamed Bourguieg	Gymnastics	2	1	0	3
Siham Mansouri	Gymnastics	2	1	0	3
Mohamed Aouicha	Gymnastics	2	0	1	3
Rania Hamida Nefsi	Swimming	1	0	2	3
Messaoud Seddam	Weightlifting	0	3	0	3
Adil Barbari	Cycling	0	1	2	3
Souad Nafissa Cherouati	Swimming	0	1	2	3
Lamya Matoub	Karate	2	0	0	2
Abdelatif Benkhaled	Karate	1	1	0	2
Saida Djebra	Karate	1	1	0	2
Sofiane Sahraoui	Gymnastics	1	0	1	2
Abdelmalik Lahoulou	Athletics	1	0	1	2
Anissa Khelfaoui	Fencing	0	1	1	2
Roman Djitli	Fencing	0	1	1	2
Miloud Rahmani	Athletics	0	1	1	2
Badis Djendouci	Swimming	0	0	2	2
Nazim Belkhodja	Swimming	0	0	2	2

=== Paralympic sports ===
Medal	Name	Sport	Event	Date
Gold	Samir Nouioua	Athletics	Men's 1500 m	15 September
Gold	Souhila Lounis	Athletics	Women's 400 m T13	17 September
Gold	Nasima Saifi	Athletics	Women's Shot Put F54-57	17 September
Silver	Ahmed Hadj Biour	Powerlifting	Men's 49 kg	12 September
Silver	Kheireddine Ougour	Athletics	Men's Javelin Throw F42-44	16 September
Silver	Mourad Bachir	Athletics	Men's Shot Put F54-55	16 September
Silver	Safia Djalal	Athletics	Women's Shot Put F54-57	17 September
Silver	Sofiane Hamdi	Athletics	Men's 100 m T37	17 September
Silver	Abdelatif Baka	Athletics	Men's 400 m T13	17 September
Silver	Nassima Saifi	Athletics	Women's Discus Throw F54/57	17 September
Bronze	Samira Guerioua	Powerlifting	Women's 45 kg	12 September
Bronze	Hocine Bettir	Powerlifting	Men's 65 kg	12 September
Bronze	Maamar Harachif	Athletics	Men's 100 m T54	14 September
Bronze	Djamil Nasser	Athletics	Men's 200 m T12	15 September
Bronze	Mohamed Ouchene	Athletics	Men's Shot Put F56-57	16 September

== Athletics ==
Men

Women

== Badminton ==
Men

Athlete	Event	Round of 64	Round of 32	Round of 16	Quarterfinals	Semifinals	Final	
Athlete	Event	Opposition Score	Opposition Score	Opposition Score	Opposition Score	Opposition Score	Opposition Score	Rank
Adel Hamek	Singles	Paul (MRI); W 21–15, 19–21, 21–16	Ayittey (GHA); W 21–13, 21–17	Ekiring (UGA); L 15–21, 21–19, 9–21	did not advance			
Youcef Sabri Medel	Singles	Githitu (KEN); W 22–20, 23–21	Abah (NGR); L 13–21, 16–21	did not advance				
Mohamed Abderrahim Belarbi	Singles	Bye	Salah (EGY); L 15–21, 15–21	did not advance				
Mohamed Abderrahime Belarbi; Adel Hamek	Doubles	—N/a	Bye	Tawana; Thela (BOT); W 21–19, 21–10	Abah; Makanju (NGR); L 16–21, 21–19, 19–21	did not advance		
Mohamed Amine Guelmaoui; Youcef Sabri Medel	Doubles	Sam; Donkor (GHA); L 17–21, 19–21	did not advance					

Women

Athlete	Event	Round of 64	Round of 32	Round of 16	Quarterfinals	Semifinals	Final	
Athlete	Event	Opposition Score	Opposition Score	Opposition Score	Opposition Score	Opposition Score	Opposition Score	Rank
Halla Bouksani	Singles	Makubate (BOT); W 21–9, 20–22, 21–15	Issoko (CGO); W 21–9, 21–5	Chan Lam (MRI); L 11–21, 10–21	did not advance			
Linda Mazri	Singles	Bye	Camille (SEY); L 20–22, 7–21	did not advance				
Halla Bouksani; Linda Mazri	Doubles	Berhanu; Tura (ETH); L 12–21, 23–25	did not advance					

Mixed

Athlete	Event	Round of 32	Round of 16	Quarterfinals	Semifinals	Final	
Athlete	Event	Opposition Score	Opposition Score	Opposition Score	Opposition Score	Opposition Score	Rank
Mohamed Abderrahime Belarbi; Halla Bouksani	Doubles	Elewa; Ideh (NGR); L 21–23, 16–21	did not advance				
Mohamed Amine Guelmaoui; Linda Mazri	Doubles	Fagbemi; Maria (NGR); L 14–21, 16–21	did not advance				
Adel Hamek; Baya Nesrine	Doubles	Ndaba; Issoko (CGO); W 21–10, 21–6	Malan; Fry (RSA); L 24–26, 12–21	did not advance			

== Basketball ==
=== Roster ===
Algeria women's national basketball team – 2015 African Games – 9th place roster
Players
Coaches

Pos.	No.	Name	Age – Date of birth	Height	Club	Ctr.
SF	4	Samiya Boudjerima	27 – 26 April 1988	1.69 m (5 ft 7 in)	Olympique Club d'Alger	(Algeria)
F	5	Nesrine Taïbi	27 – 28 June 1988	1.87 m (6 ft 2 in)	GS Pétroliers	(Algeria)
F	6	Ikbal Chenaf	31 – 21 September 1983	1.80 m (5 ft 11 in)	GS Pétroliers	(Algeria)
G	7	Nadia Isli	32 – 14 March 1983	1.68 m (5 ft 6 in)	GS Pétroliers	(Algeria)
C	8	Soumeya Regani	27 – 16 August 1988	1.92 m (6 ft 4 in)	SMUC	(France)
SF	9	Lina Mahsas	21 – 20 June 1994	1.80 m (5 ft 11 in)	Poinçonnet Basket	(France)
SG	10	Lilia Refes	20 – 11 February 1995	1.67 m (5 ft 6 in)	GS Pétroliers	(Algeria)
SF	11	Sarah Nemmouchi	26 – 8 February 1989	1.80 m (5 ft 11 in)	AS Rognac	(France)
PF	12	Nesrine Boussaid	24 – 25 October 1990	1.78 m (5 ft 10 in)	Venelles BC	(France)
G	13	Shahnez Boushaki	29 – 22 October 1985	1.75 m (5 ft 9 in)	GS Pétroliers	(Algeria)
C	14	Soulef Necib	26 – 25 January 1989	1.93 m (6 ft 4 in)	Olympique Club d'Alger	(Algeria)
F	15	Lylia Tlemsani	18 – 13 July 1997	1.85 m (6 ft 1 in)	GS Pétroliers	(Algeria)

Head coach

- (Algeria) Azzedine Labouize

Assistant coach

- (Algeria) Lyacine Belal

Legend

- (C) Team captain
- Club field describes current club

=== Women ===
==== Group B ====
Qualified for the quarter-finals

Team	Pld	W	L	PF	PA	PD	Pts
Senegal	4	4	0	307	194	+113	8
Angola	4	3	1	222	209	+13	7
Ivory Coast	4	2	2	242	237	+5	6
Gabon	4	1	3	205	271	-66	5
Algeria	4	0	4	225	290	-65	4

9 September 2015
10:00

Boxscore

Algeria	51–61	Angola
Scoring by quarter: 9-6, 14-22, 14-18, 14-15
Pts: Boushaki 15; Rebs: Boushaki, Isli 4 Asts: 0		Pts: Ana 14; Rebs: Isabel 5 Asts: 0

Gymnase Makélékélé, Brazzaville
Referees: Armand Okoua (CGO), Guy Sani (CMR), Dorothy Okatch (BOT)

10 September 2015
12:00

Boxscore

Ivory Coast	72–56	Algeria
Scoring by quarter: 22-9, 14-17, 14-13, 22-17
Pts: Cisse 19; Rebs: Djedjemel 7 Asts: fofana 4		Pts: Mahsas 25; Rebs: Mahsas, Regani 5 Asts: Isli, Boudjerima 2

Gymnase Makélékélé, Brazzaville
Referees: Ambrose Mbalu (KEN), Hesham Metwaly (EGY), Dorothy Okatch (BOT)

20:00

Boxscore

Senegal	88–61	Algeria
Scoring by quarter: 32-20, 23-11, 15-15, 18-15
Pts: Dieng 15; Rebs: Ay.Traoré 6 Asts: Thiam 4		Pts: Mahsas 16; Rebs: chenaf 6 Asts: Isli 3

Gymnase Makélékélé, Brazzaville
Referees: Annie Muchenu (ZIM), Toussaint Niamien (CIV), Olusegun Adekanmbi (NGR)

14 September 2015
10:00

Boxscore

Algeria	57–69	Gabon
Scoring by quarter: 18-16, 5-23, 13-11, 21-19
Pts: Mahsas 12; Rebs: Regani 11; Asts: Boushaki, Isli 2		Pts: Mbaikoua 21; Rebs: Robert 24; Asts: Robert 4

Gymnase Makélékélé, Brazzaville
Referees: Abreu Muhimua (MOZ), Aissatou Diagne (SEN), Olusegun Adekanmbi (NGR)

== Boxing ==
Men

Athlete	Event	Round of 16	Quarterfinals	Semifinals	Final	
Athlete	Event	Opposition Result	Opposition Result	Opposition Result	Opposition Result	Rank
Zoheir Toudjine	Light flyweight		Zrgaw (ETH); L 1–2	did not advance		
Mohamed Flissi	Flyweight		Akimos (GHA); W 3–0	Mikamou (GAB); W 2–1	Nkolomoni (COD); W 3–0	1st place, gold medalist(s)
Khalil Litim	Bantamweight	Gicharu (KEN); W 3–0	Gefachew (ETH); W 3–0	Gomes (ANG); W 3–0	M'hamdi (TUN); L 1–2	2nd place, silver medalist(s)
Reda Benbaziz	Lightweight	Bartos (MOZ); W 3–0	Colin (MRI); W 2–1	Nelson (KEN); W 2–1	Sarouna (TOG); W 3–0	1st place, gold medalist(s)
Abdelkader Chadi	Light Welterweight	Mukibi (UGA); W 3–0	Tsedo (LES); W 3–0	Bagwasi (CGO); W 3–0	Jonas (NAM); W 2–1	1st place, gold medalist(s)
Zoheir Keddache	Welterweight	Khoai (LES); W 3–0	Massala (CGO); RSC	did not advance		
Ilyas Abbadi	Middleweight	Ademuyima (NGR); W 3–0	L'Muala (COD); RSC	did not advance		
Abdelhafid Benchabla	Light Heavyweight		Botumbe (COD); W 3–0	Kenneth (UGA); W 3–0	Orabi (EGY); W 2–1	1st place, gold medalist(s)
Chouaib Bouloudinat	Heavyweight		Apochi (NGR); L 1–2	did not advance		
Mohamed Grimes	Super Heavyweight		Camara (GUI); KO	Agnes (SEY); L 0–3	Did not advance	3rd place, bronze medalist(s)

== Cycling ==
=== Road ===
Athlete	Event	Time	Rank
Adil Barbari	Men's road race	3:30.08	3rd place, bronze medalist(s)
Abdelkader Belmokhtar	Men's road race	3:30.08	8
Abderrahmane Mansouri	Men's road race	3:30.08	10
Abderrahmane Bechelaghem	Men's road race	3:30.17	36
Nassim Saidi	Men's road race	3:30.08	11
Azzedine Lagab	Men's road race	DNF	
Abdelbasset Hannachi	Men's road race	DNF	
Abdellah Benyoucef	Men's road race	DNF	
Adil Barbari	Men's time trial	15:27.00	3rd place, bronze medalist(s)
Abdelkader Belmokhtar	Men's time trial	15:41.03	6
Abderrahmane Mansouri; Abderrahmane Bechelaghem; Nassim Saidi; Adil Barbari	Men's team time trial	29:50.54	2nd place, silver medalist(s)

== Swimming ==
Men

Athlete	Event	Heat		Final	
Athlete	Event	Time	Rank	Time	Rank
Nazim Belkhodja	50 metre freestyle	23.64	2 FB	23.54	7
Nazim Belkhodja	100 metre freestyle	51.45	2 FB	51.23	6
Badis Djendouci	100 metre freestyle	53.02	5 FB	—N/a	
Imad Eddine Tchouar	200 metre freestyle	1:59.40	3 FB	—N/a	
Imad Eddine Tchouar	400 metre freestyle	—N/a		4:03.59	7
Imad Eddine Tchouar	800 metre freestyle	—N/a		8:25.75	6
Imad Eddine Tchouar	1500 metre freestyle	—N/a		16:18.80	5
Riyad Djendouci	50 metre backstroke	27.76	1 FB	27.35	6
Riyad Djendouci	100 metre backstroke	59.95	3 FB	59.43	5
Lies Abdelghani Nefsi	200 metre backstroke	—N/a		2:14.97	7
Abdelkader Mohamme Afane	50 metre breaststroke	28.61	2 FB	28.75	4
Abdelkader Mohamme Afane	100 metre breaststroke	1:05.22	3 FB	1:04.50	8
Abdelkader Mohamme Afane	200 metre breaststroke	2:25.56	1 FB	2:21.75	4
Badis Djendouci	100 metre butterfly	58.46	4 FB	—N/a	
Lies Abdelghani Nefsi	200 metre Individual medley	—N/a		DNS	
Badis Djendouci; Nazim Belkhodja; Riyad Djendouci; Lies Abdelghani Nefsi	4×100 metre freestyle relay	—N/a		3:26.16	3rd place, bronze medalist(s)
Badis Djendouci; Abdelkader Mohamme Afane; Lies Abdelghani Nefsi; Imad Eddine Tchouar	4×200 metre freestyle relay	—N/a		7:57.69	4
Riyad Djendouci; Nazim Belkhodja; Lies Abdelghani Nefsi; Abdelkader Mohamme Afane	4×100 metre medley relay	—N/a		3:52.59	4

Qualification Legend: FA=Final A (medal); FB=Final B (non-medal)

Women

Athlete	Event	Heat		Final	
Athlete	Event	Time	Rank	Time	Rank
Majda Chebaraka	100 metre freestyle	58.59	5 FB	57.94	4
Majda Chebaraka	200 metre freestyle	2:07.70	4 FA	2:02.63	3rd place, bronze medalist(s)
Rania Hamida Nefsi	200 metre freestyle	DNS			
Majda Chebaraka	400 metre freestyle	—N/a		4:19.24	2nd place, silver medalist(s)
Majda Chebaraka	800 metre freestyle	—N/a		8:58.53	1st place, gold medalist(s)
Souad Nafissa Cherouati	800 metre freestyle	—N/a		DNS	
Majda Chebaraka	1500 metre freestyle	—N/a		17:07.82	1st place, gold medalist(s)
Souad Nafissa Cherouati	1500 metre freestyle	—N/a		17:18.35	3rd place, bronze medalist(s)
Hannah Taleb Bendiab	50 metre breaststroke	33.98	5 FB	33.84	7
Hannah Taleb Bendiab	100 metre breaststroke	1:16.44	7 FB	—N/a	
Hannah Taleb Bendiab	200 metre breaststroke	2:45.15	5 FB	2:42.09	6
Souad Nafissa Cherouati	200 metre Individual medley	2:24.48	6 FB	2:23.15	7
Hamida Rania Nefsi	200 metre Individual medley	2:26.84	9 FB	—N/a	
Hamida Rania Nefsi	400 metre Individual medley	—N/a		4:56.75	1st place, gold medalist(s)
Souad Nafissa Cherouati	400 metre Individual medley	—N/a		4:57.30	2nd place, silver medalist(s)
Majda Chebaraka; Souad Nafissa Cherouati; Hamida Rania Nefsi; Hannah Taleb Bendiab	4×100 metre freestyle relay	—N/a		4:01.26	4
Majda Chebaraka; Souad Nafissa Cherouati; Hamida Rania Nefsi; Hannah Taleb Bendiab	4×200 metre freestyle relay	—N/a		8:35.11	3rd place, bronze medalist(s)

Qualification Legend: FA=Final A (medal); FB=Final B (non-medal)

Mixed

Athlete	Event	Heat		Final	
Athlete	Event	Time	Rank	Time	Rank
Nazim Belkhodja; Souad Nafissa Cherouati; Badis Djendouci; Majda Chebaraka	4×100 metre freestyle mixed	—N/a		3:49.04	3rd place, bronze medalist(s)
Majda Chebaraka; Hamida Rania Nefsi; Riyad Djendouci; Abdelkader Mohamme Afane	4×100 metre medley mixed	—N/a		4:08.09	5

Qualification Legend: FA=Final A (medal); FB=Final B (non-medal)

== Volleyball ==
=== Group B ===
Pos	Team	Pld	W	L	Pts	SW	SL	SR	SPW	SPL	SPR	Qualification
1	Algeria	5	5	0	14	15	4	3.750	467	367	1.272	Semifinals
2	Rwanda	5	3	2	10	12	8	1.500	462	463	0.998	Semifinals
3	Cameroon	5	3	2	9	11	7	1.571	443	384	1.154	
4	Ghana	5	3	2	9	10	7	1.429	394	373	1.056	
5	Cape Verde	5	1	4	2	3	14	0.214	302	406	0.744	
6	Seychelles	5	0	5	1	4	15	0.267	372	447	0.832	

Date		Score		Set 1	Set 2	Set 3	Set 4	Set 5	Total
3 Sep	Algeria	3–2	Rwanda	27–29	25–17	25–19	24–26	15–10	116–101
6 Sep	Algeria	3–0	Seychelles	25–16	25–10	25–16	–	–	75–42
8 Sep	Algeria	3–1	Cameroon	29–27	27–25	24–26	25–21	–	105–99
10 Sep	Algeria	3–0	Cape Verde	25–8	25–15	25–17	–	–	75–40
12 Sep	Algeria	3–1	Ghana	21–25	25–17	25–20	25–23	–	96–85

==== Semifinals ====
Date		Score		Set 1	Set 2	Set 3	Set 4	Set 5	Total
13 Sep	Algeria	3–2	Egypt	25–16	20–25	19–25	25–18	15–6	104–90

==== Final ====
Date		Score		Set 1	Set 2	Set 3	Set 4	Set 5	Total
14 Sep	Algeria	3–0	Congo	25–20	25–22	27–25	–	–	77–67

=== Group B ===
Pos	Team	Pld	W	L	Pts	SW	SL	SR	SPW	SPL	SPR	Qualification
1	Cameroon	5	5	0	14	15	2	7.500	411	274	1.500	Semifinals
2	Kenya	5	4	1	13	14	4	3.500	420	337	1.246	Semifinals
3	Algeria	5	3	2	9	10	7	1.429	382	327	1.168	
4	Nigeria	5	2	3	6	7	12	0.583	337	388	0.869	
5	Cape Verde	5	1	4	2	4	14	0.286	324	423	0.766	
6	Mozambique	5	0	5	1	2	15	0.133	282	407	0.693	

Date		Score		Set 1	Set 2	Set 3	Set 4	Set 5	Total
2 Sep	Kenya	3–1	Algeria	23–25	25–19	25–15	25–23		98–82
6 Sep	Algeria	3–1	Nigeria	21–25	25–12	25–13	25–15		96–55
8 Sep	Algeria	3–0	Cape Verde	25–13	25–19	25–11			75–43
10 Sep	Algeria	0–3	Cameroon	19–25	15–25	20–25			54–75
12 Sep	Algeria	3–0	Mozambique	25–16	25–19	25–11			75–46
