= Swimming at the 2015 African Games – Women's 50 metre breaststroke =

Women's 50 metre breaststroke at the 2015 African Games
- Venue: Kintele Aquatic Complex
- Date: September 8, 2015

Medalists
gold medal	Tatjana Schoenmaker	South Africa
silver medal	Maii Atif	Egypt
bronze medal	Daniela Lindemeier	Namibia

The women's 50 metre breaststroke event at the 2015 African Games took place on 8 September 2015 at Kintele Aquatic Complex.

== Schedule ==
All times are Congo Standard Time (UTC+01:00)

Date	Time	Event
Tuesday, 8 September 2015	10:23	Heat 1
Tuesday, 8 September 2015	10:25	Heat 2
Tuesday, 8 September 2015	10:27	Heat 3
Tuesday, 8 September 2015	17:50	Final

== Results ==
=== Heats ===
Rank	Heat	Athlete	Time	Notes
1	2	Maii Atif (EGY)	32.45	Q GR
2	1	Tatjana Schoenmaker (RSA)	32.57	Q
3	2	Daniela Lindemeier (NAM)	32.74	Q
4	1	Kelly Gunnell (RSA)	33.05	Q
5	3	Hannah Taleb Bendiab (ALG)	33.98	Q
6	3	Rebecca Kamau (KEN)	33.99	Q
7	3	Nermine Balbaa (EGY)	34.06	Q
8	1	Farah Ben Khelil (TUN)	34.66	Q
9	2	Rachek Tonjor (NGR)	35.34	
10	2	Bonita Imsirovic (BOT)	35.43	
11	3	Natasha Oduor Owino (KEN)	37.86	
12	3	Gisela Cossa (MOZ)	39.18	
13	2	Avice Meya (UGA)	41.32	
14	3	Stefan Bellore Sangala (CGO)	41.66	
15	1	Jannat Bique (MOZ)	42.25	
16	1	Pilar Ndong Mangue (GEQ)	46.03	
17	2	Natasha Emefa Addah (GHA)	49.58	
18	1	Mariama Dioulde Sow (GUI)	52.59	
19	2	Jalloh Bunturabie (SLE)	55.11	
20	1	Shannon Hassen (ZAM)	NP	

=== Final ===
Rank	Athlete	Time	Notes
1st place, gold medalist(s)	Tatjana Schoenmaker (RSA)	32.49	
2nd place, silver medalist(s)	Maii Atif (EGY)	32.58	
3rd place, bronze medalist(s)	Daniela Lindemeier (NAM)	32.69	
4	Kelly Gunnell (RSA)	32.85	
5	Rebecca Kamau (KEN)	33.60	
6	Nermine Balbaa (EGY)	33.70	
7	Hannah Taleb Bendiab (ALG)	33.84	
8	Farah Ben Khelil (TUN)	34.35	
