= Swimming at the 2015 African Games – Men's 4×100 metre medley relay =

Men's 4×100 metre medley relay at the 2015 African Games
- Venue: Kintele Aquatic Complex
- Date: September 11, 2015
- Competitors: 32 from 8 nations

Medalists
| gold medal | Mohamed Khaled, Youssef El Kamash, Omar Eissa, Mohamed Samy | Egypt |
| silver medal | Richard Ellis, Ayrton Sweeney, Nico Meyer, Clayton Jimmie | South Africa |
| bronze medal | Ahmed Mathlouthi, Wassim Elloumi, Mohamed Mehdi Laagili, Mohamed Ali Chaoachi | Tunisia |

The Men's 4×100 metre medley relay event at the 2015 African Games took place on 11 September 2015 at Kintele Aquatic Complex.

== Schedule ==
All times are Congo Standard Time (UTC+01:00)

| Date | Time | Event |
|---|---|---|
| Friday, 11 September 2015 | 18:45 | Final |

== Results ==
=== Final ===
The final were held on 11 September.

| Rank | Team | Time | Notes |
|---|---|---|---|
| 1st place, gold medalist(s) | Egypt (EGY) | 3:42.44 | |
| | Mohamed Khaled | 56.85 | |
| | Youssef El Kamash | 1:02.10 | |
| | Omar Eissa | 54.16 | |
| | Mohamed Samy | 49.33 | |
| 2nd place, silver medalist(s) | South Africa (RSA) | 3:42.85 | |
| | Richard Ellis | 55.90 | |
| | Ayrton Sweeney | 1:03.39 | |
| | Nico Meyer | 54.37 | |
| | Clayton Jimmie | 49.19 | |
| 3rd place, bronze medalist(s) | Tunisia (TUN) | 3:52.00 | |
| | Ahmed Mathlouthi | 58.10 | |
| | Wassim Elloumi | 1:02.93 | |
| | Mohamed Mehdi Laagili | 59.16 | |
| | Mohamed Ali Chaoachi | 51.81 | |
| 4 | Algeria (ALG) | 3:52.59 | |
| | Riyad Djendouci | 59.73 | |
| | Abdelkader Mohamme Afane | 1:04.27 | |
| | Lies Abdelghani Nefsi | 58.53 | |
| | Nazim Belkhodja | 50.06 | |
| 5 | Senegal (SEN) | 3:58.66 | |
| | Matar Samba | 1:03.11 | |
| | Malick Fall | 1:03.23 | |
| | Ismael Eliot Kane | 59.56 | |
| | Abdoul Niane | 52.76 | |
| 6 | Kenya (KEN) | 4:00.51 | |
| | Hamdan Bayusuf | 1:01.22 | |
| | Tory Pragassa | 1:07.02 | |
| | Issa Abdellah | 58.53 | |
| | Kimani Maina | 53.74 | |
| 7 | Mozambique (MOZ) | 4:10.10 | |
| | Igor Mogne | 1:01.34 | |
| | Ahllan Bique | 1:13.41 | |
| | Valdo Lourecon | 59.88 | |
| | Denilso Da Costa | 55.47 | |
| 8 | Republic of the Congo (CGO) | 4:51.13 | |
| | Emile Rony Bakale | 1:04.15 | |
| | Dienov Andres Koka | 1:26.41 | |
| | Brynich Mibansa | 1:11.98 | |
| | Anauskajynior Ndinga | 1:08.59 | |
