= Swimming at the 2015 African Games – Women's 4×200 metre freestyle relay =

Water sports event

Women's 4×200 metre freestyle relay at the 2015 African Games
- Venue: Kintele Aquatic Complex
- Date: September 6, 2015
- Competitors: 16 from 4 nations

Medalists
gold medal	Rene Warnes, Marlies Ross, Charlise Oberholzer, Karin Prinsloo	South Africa
silver medal	Roaia Mashaly, Salma Saber, Mariam Sakr, Rowan El Badry	Egypt
bronze medal	Majda Chebaraka, Hamida Rania Nefsi, Souad Nafissa Cherouati, Hannah Taleb Bendiab	Algeria

The women's 4×200 metre freestyle relay event at the 2015 African Games took place on 6 September 2015 at Kintele Aquatic Complex.

== Schedule ==
All times are Congo Standard Time (UTC+01:00)

Date	Time	Event
Sunday, 6 September 2015	18:15	Final

== Results ==
=== Final ===
Rank	Team	Time	Notes
1st place, gold medalist(s)	South Africa (RSA)	8:20.28	
	Rene Warnes	2:04.51	
	Marlies Ross	2:06.57	
	Charlise Oberholzer	2:08.04	
	Karin Prinsloo	2:01.16	
2nd place, silver medalist(s)	Egypt (EGY)	8:30.84	NR
	Roaia Mashaly	2:05.51	
	Salma Saber	2:06.64	
	Mariam Sakr	2:07.20	
	Rowan El Badry	2:11.19	
3rd place, bronze medalist(s)	Algeria (ALG)	8:35.11	
	Majda Chebaraka	2:03.89	
	Hamida Rania Nefsi	2:13.31	
	Souad Nafissa Cherouati	2:08.26	
	Hannah Taleb Bendiab	2:09.65	
4	Tunisia (TUN)	8:47.08	
	Rim Ouennich	2:08.51	
	Asma Ben Boukhatem	2:09.44	
	Asma Sammoud	2:12.75	
	Farah Ben Khelil	2:16.38	
