= Swimming at the 2015 African Games – Women's 400 metre freestyle =

Women's 400 metre freestyle at the 2015 African Games
- Venue: Kintele Aquatic Complex
- Date: September 8, 2015
- Competitors: 7 from 5 nations

Medalists
gold medal	Karin Prinsloo	South Africa
silver medal	Majda Chebaraka	Algeria
bronze medal	Marlies Ross	South Africa

The women's 400 metre freestyle event at the 2015 African Games took place on 8 September 2015 at Kintele Aquatic Complex.

== Schedule ==
All times are Congo Standard Time (UTC+01:00)

Date	Time	Event
Tuesday, 8 September 2015	17:00	Final

== Results ==
=== Final ===
Rank	Athlete	Time	Notes
1st place, gold medalist(s)	Karin Prinsloo (RSA)	4:18.86	
2nd place, silver medalist(s)	Majda Chebaraka (ALG)	4:19.24	
3rd place, bronze medalist(s)	Marlies Ross (RSA)	4:19.43	
4	Roaia Mashaly (EGY)	4:24.76	
5	Talita Marie Te Flan (CIV)	4:29.64	
6	Asma Ben Boukhatem (TUN)	4:36.45	
7	Reem Kaseem (EGY)	4:37.20	
