= Swimming at the 2015 African Games – Women's 800 metre freestyle =

Swimming event at 2015 African Games

Women's 800 metre freestyle at the 2015 African Games
- Venue: Kintele Aquatic Complex
- Date: September 9, 2015
- Competitors: 8 from 5 nations

Medalists
gold medal	Majda Chebaraka	Algeria
silver medal	Charlise Oberholzer	South Africa
bronze medal	Roaia Mashaly	Egypt

The women's 800 metre freestyle event at the 2015 African Games took place on 9 September 2015 at Kintele Aquatic Complex.

== Schedule ==
All times are Congo Standard Time (UTC+01:00)

Date	Time	Event
Wednesday, 9 September 2015	17:50	Final

== Results ==
=== Final ===
Rank	Athlete	Time	Notes
1st place, gold medalist(s)	Majda Chebaraka (ALG)	8:58.53	
2nd place, silver medalist(s)	Charlise Oberholzer (RSA)	9:00.15	
3rd place, bronze medalist(s)	Roaia Mashaly (EGY)	9:07.94	
4	Talita Marie Te Flan (CIV)	9:12.18	
5	Reem Kaseem (EGY)	9:25.11	
6	Asma Ben Boukhatem (TUN)	9:32.98	
7	Megan Van Wyk (RSA)	NP	
8	Souad Nafissa Cherouati (ALG)	NP	
