= Swimming at the 2015 African Games – Men's 200 metre freestyle =

Men's 200 metre freestyle at the 2015 African Games
- Venue: Kintele Aquatic Complex
- Date: September 6, 2015
- Competitors: 18 from 12 nations
- Winning time: 1:47.77

Medalists
gold medal	Devon Brown	South Africa
silver medal	Marwan Elkamash	Egypt
bronze medal	Ahmed Mathlouthi	Tunisia

The Men's 200 metre freestyle event at the 2015 African Games took place on 6 September 2015 at Kintele Aquatic Complex.

== Schedule ==
All times are Congo Standard Time (UTC+01:00)

Date	Time	Event
Sunday, 6 September 2015	10:12	Heat 1
Sunday, 6 September 2015	10:16	Heat 2
Sunday, 6 September 2015	10:20	Heat 3
Sunday, 6 September 2015	17:25	Final

== Records ==
Prior to the competition, the existing world and championship records were as follows.

	Name	Nation	Time	Location	Date
World record	Paul Biedermann	Germany	1:42.00	Rome	28 July 2009
African record	Jean Basson	South Africa	1:45.67	Rome	28 July 2009
Games record	Ahmed Mathlouthi	Tunisia	1:48.95	Maputo	5 September 2011

The following new records were set during this competition.

Date	Event	Name	Nation	Time	Record
6 September	Final	Devon Brown	South Africa	1:47.77	GR

== Results ==
=== Heats ===
The heats were held on 6 September.

Rank	Heat	Lane	Name	Nationality	Time	Notes
1	1	4	Calvyn Justus	South Africa	1:50.77	Q
2	3	4	Devon Brown	South Africa	1:50.92	Q
3	3	5	Marwan El-Amrawy	Egypt	1:51.83	Q
4	2	4	Marwan Elkamash	Egypt	1:51.91	Q
5	1	5	Mohamed Lagili	Tunisia	1:52.56	Q
6	2	3	Ahmed Mathlouthi	Tunisia	1:52.64	Q
7	2	3	Sean Gunn	Zimbabwe	1:54.41	Q
8	3	6	Igor Mogne	Mozambique	1:54.60	Q
9	2	6	Mathieu Marquet	Mauritius	1:56.33	
10	3	3	Lies Nefsi	Algeria	1:57.06	
11	1	3	Imad Tchouar	Algeria	1:59.40	
12	1	6	Ismael Kane	Senegal	2:00.61	
13	3	2	Jörn Diekmann	Namibia	2:01.77	
14	2	2	Andre van der Merwe	Botswana	2:05.00	
15	3	7	Michael Botha	Botswana	2:14.97	
16	2	7	Emmanuel Ndonga	Kenya	2:21.34	
17	1	2	Ahllan Bique	Mozambique	2:27.91	
18	1	7	Oumar Kaba	Guinea	2:45.39	

=== Final ===
The final were held on 6 September.

Rank	Lane	Name	Nationality	Time	Notes
1st place, gold medalist(s)	5	Devon Brown	South Africa	1:47.77	GR
2nd place, silver medalist(s)	6	Marwan Elkamash	Egypt	1:48.58	
3rd place, bronze medalist(s)	7	Ahmed Mathlouthi	Tunisia	1:49.29	
4	4	Calvyn Justus	South Africa	1:49.58	
5	2	Mohamed Lagili	Tunisia	1:50.21	
6	3	Marwan El-Amrawy	Egypt	1:53.15	
7	8	Igor Mogne	Mozambique	1:53.77	
8	1	Sean Gunn	Zimbabwe	1:54.15	
