= Swimming at the 2015 African Games – Women's 50 metre backstroke =

Women's 50 metre backstroke at the 2015 African Games
- Venue: Kintele Aquatic Complex
- Date: September 6, 2015
- Competitors: 13 from 9 nations

Medalists
gold medal	Jessica Ashley Cooper	South Africa
silver medal	Naomi Ruele	Botswana
bronze medal	Alexus Laird	Seychelles

The women's 50 metre backstroke event at the 2015 African Games took place on 6 September 2015 at Kintele Aquatic Complex.

== Schedule ==
All times are Congo Standard Time (UTC+01:00)

Date	Time	Event
Sunday, 6 September 2015	10:25	Heat 1
Sunday, 6 September 2015	10:27	Heat 2
Sunday, 6 September 2015	17:37	Final

== Results ==
=== Heats ===
Rank	Heat	Athlete	Time	Notes
1	2	Jessica Ashley Cooper (RSA)	29.68	Q
2	2	Naomi Ruele (BOT)	29.91	Q
3	2	Rita Naude (RSA)	30.23	Q
4	1	Alexus Laird (SEY)	30.43	Q
5	2	Rim Ouennich (TUN)	30.90	Q
6	1	Mariam Sakr (EGY)	31.27	Q
7	2	Heather Arseth (MRI)	31.81	Q
8	1	Talisa Lanoe (KEN)	32.14	Q
9	1	Farah Ben Khelil (TUN)	32.20	
10	2	Anita Field (KEN)	32.73	
11	1	Malk Alnady (EGY)	32.90	
12	1	Shannon Hassen (ZAM)	33.27	
13	2	Jannat Bique (MOZ)	33.84	

=== Final ===
Rank	Athlete	Time	Notes
1st place, gold medalist(s)	Jessica Ashley Cooper (RSA)	29.05	
2nd place, silver medalist(s)	Naomi Ruele (BOT)	29.70	
3rd place, bronze medalist(s)	Alexus Laird (SEY)	30.07	
4	Rim Ouennich (TUN)	30.44	
5	Rita Naude (RSA)	30.58	
6	Mariam Sakr (EGY)	31.16	
7	Heather Arseth (MRI)	31.58	
8	Talisa Lanoe (KEN)	31.86	
