= Swimming at the 2015 African Games – Men's 400 metre freestyle =

Men's 400 metre freestyle at the 2015 African Games
- Venue: Kintele Aquatic Complex
- Date: September 9, 2015
- Competitors: 13 from 10 nations
- Winning time: 3:48.08

Medalists
gold medal	Ahmed Akram	Egypt
silver medal	Devon Brown	South Africa
bronze medal	Ahmed Mathlouthi	Tunisia

The Men's 400 metre freestyle event at the 2015 African Games took place on 9 September 2015 at Kintele Aquatic Complex.

== Schedule ==
All times are Congo Standard Time (UTC+01:00)

Date	Time	Event
Wednesday, 9 September 2015	10:07	Heat 1
Wednesday, 9 September 2015	10:13	Heat 2
Wednesday, 9 September 2015	17:20	Final

== Records ==
Prior to the competition, the existing world and championship records were as follows.

	Name	Nation	Time	Location	Date
World record	Paul Biedermann	Germany	3:40.07	Rome	26 July 2009
African record	Oussama Mellouli	Tunisia	3:41.11	Rome	26 July 2009
Games record	Ahmed Mathlouthi	Tunisia	3:54.03	Maputo	8 September 2011

The following new records were set during this competition.

Date	Event	Name	Nation	Time	Record
9 September	Final	Ahmed Akram	Egypt	3:48.08	GR

== Results ==
=== Heats ===
The heats were held on 9 September.

Rank	Heat	Lane	Name	Nationality	Time	Notes
1	1	4	Ahmed Akram	Egypt	4:00.04	Q
2	1	5	Ahmed Mathlouthi	Tunisia	4:00.55	Q
3	2	3	Calvyn Justus	South Africa	4:02.19	Q
4	2	4	Devon Brown	South Africa	4:02.48	Q
5	2	5	Marwan Elkamash	Egypt	4:02.50	Q
6	2	2	Igor Mogne	Mozambique	4:06.00	Q
7	2	6	Imad Tchouar	Algeria	4:07.44	Q
8	1	3	Mohamed Lagili	Tunisia	4:08.26	Q
9	1	6	Pedro Pinotes	Angola	4:08.74	
10	1	2	Sean Gunn	Zimbabwe	4:15.04	
11	2	7	Ismael Kane	Senegal	4:24.43	
12	1	7	Jörn Diekmann	Namibia	4:26.92	
13	2	1	Andre van der Merwe	Botswana	4:41.13	

=== Final ===
The final were held on 9 September.

Rank	Lane	Name	Nationality	Time	Notes
1st place, gold medalist(s)	4	Ahmed Akram	Egypt	3:48.06	GR NR
2nd place, silver medalist(s)	6	Devon Brown	South Africa	3:48.69	
3rd place, bronze medalist(s)	5	Ahmed Mathlouthi	Tunisia	3:51.47	
4	2	Marwan Elkamash	Egypt	3:56.27	
5	3	Calvyn Justus	South Africa	3:59.99	
6	8	Mohamed Lagili	Tunisia	4:01.89	
7	1	Imad Tchouar	Algeria	4:03.59	
8	7	Igor Mogne	Mozambique	4:04.11	NR
