= Swimming at the 2015 African Games – Women's 200 metre breaststroke =

Women's 200 metre breaststroke at the 2015 African Games
- Venue: Kintele Aquatic Complex
- Date: September 7, 2015
- Competitors: 10 from 8 nations

Medalists
gold medal	Tatjana Schoenmaker	South Africa
silver medal	Kelly Gunnell	South Africa
bronze medal	Daniela Lindemeier	Namibia

The women's 200 metre breaststroke event at the 2015 African Games took place on 7 September 2015 at Kintele Aquatic Complex.

== Schedule ==
All times are Congo Standard Time (UTC+01:00)

Date	Time	Event
Monday, 7 September 2015	10:16	Heat 1
Monday, 7 September 2015	10:20	Heat 2
Monday, 7 September 2015	17:34	Final

== Records ==
Prior to the competition, the existing world and championship records were as follows.

	Name	Nation	Time	Location	Date
World record	Rikke Møller Pedersen	Denmark	2:19.11	Barcelona	1 August 2013
African record	Suzaan van Biljon	South Africa	2:23.21	London	2 August 2012
Games record	Penny Heyns	South Africa	2:28.00	Johannesburg	13 September 1999

== Results ==
=== Heats ===
Rank	Heat	Athlete	Time	Notes
1	2	Tatjana Schoenmaker (RSA)	2:31.28	Q
2	1	Kelly Gunnell (RSA)	2:32.92	Q
3	2	Daniela Lindemeier (NAM)	2:33.42	Q
4	1	Rwioda Heshem (EGY)	2:41.16	Q
5	2	Hannah Taleb Bendiab (ALG)	2:45.15	Q
6	1	Nermine Balbaa (EGY)	2:46.14	Q
7	2	Tessa Ip Hen Chung (MRI)	2:50.96	Q
8	2	Bonita Imsirovic (BOT)	2:51.41	Q
9	1	Natasha Oduor Owino (KEN)	3:12.17	
10	2	Gisela Cossa (MOZ)	3:12.30	

=== Final ===
Rank	Athlete	Time	Notes
1st place, gold medalist(s)	Tatjana Schoenmaker (RSA)	2:28.84	
2nd place, silver medalist(s)	Kelly Gunnell (RSA)	2:31.52	
3rd place, bronze medalist(s)	Daniela Lindemeier (NAM)	2:34.23	
4	Rwioda Heshem (EGY)	2:35.48	
5	Nermine Balbaa (EGY)	2:41.51	
6	Hannah Taleb Bendiab (ALG)	2:42.09	
7	Tessa Ip Hen Chung (MRI)	2:50.96	
8	Bonita Imsirovic (BOT)	2:54.92	
