= Swimming at the 2015 African Games – Men's 200 metre backstroke =

Men's 200 metre backstroke at the 2015 African Games
- Venue: Kintele Aquatic Complex
- Date: September 8, 2015
- Competitors: 8 from 5 nations

Medalists
gold medal	Martin Binedell	South Africa
silver medal	Richard Ellis	South Africa
bronze medal	Mohamed Khaled	Egypt

The Men's 200 metre backstroke event at the 2015 African Games took place on 8 September 2015 at Kintele Aquatic Complex.

== Schedule ==
All times are Congo Standard Time (UTC+01:00)

Date	Time	Event
Tuesday, 8 September 2015	17:35	Final

== Results ==
=== Final ===
The final were held on 8 September.

Rank	Athlete	Time	Notes
1st place, gold medalist(s)	Martin Binedell (RSA)	2:02.23	
2nd place, silver medalist(s)	Richard Ellis (RSA)	2:02.32	
3rd place, bronze medalist(s)	Mohamed Khaled (EGY)	2:04.35	
4	Ahmed Hamdy (EGY)	2:04.42	
5	Igor Mogne (MOZ)	2:12.83	
6	Kimani Maina (KEN)	2:13.52	
7	Lies Abdelghani Nefsi (ALG)	2:14.97	
8	Emmanuel Ndonga (KEN)	2:34.01	
