= Swimming at the 2015 African Games – Women's 400 metre Individual medley =

Women's 400 metre Individual medley at the 2015 African Games
- Venue: Kintele Aquatic Complex
- Date: September 6, 2015
- Competitors: 7 from 4 nations

Medalists
gold medal	Hamida Rania Nefsi	Algeria
silver medal	Souad Nafissa Cherouati	Algeria
bronze medal	Rwioda Heshem	Egypt

The women's 400 metre Individual medley event at the 2015 African Games took place on 6 September 2015 at Kintele Aquatic Complex.

== Schedule ==
All times are Congo Standard Time (UTC+01:00)

Date	Time	Event
Sunday, 6 September 2015	17:10	Final

== Results ==
=== Final ===
Rank	Athlete	Time	Notes
1st place, gold medalist(s)	Hamida Rania Nefsi (ALG)	4:56.75	
2nd place, silver medalist(s)	Souad Nafissa Cherouati (ALG)	4:57.30	
3rd place, bronze medalist(s)	Rwioda Heshem (EGY)	4:58.88	
4	Marlies Ross (RSA)	5:01.79	
5	Yara Emad (EGY)	5:02.75	
6	Megan Van Wyk (RSA)	5:03.06	
7	Asma Sammoud (TUN)	5:14.71	
