= Swimming at the 2015 African Games – Women's 1500 metre freestyle =

Women's 1500 metre freestyle at the 2015 African Games
- Venue: Kintele Aquatic Complex
- Date: September 11, 2015
- Competitors: 7 from 5 nations

Medalists
| gold medal | Majda Chebaraka | Algeria |
| silver medal | Charlise Oberholzer | South Africa |
| bronze medal | Souad Nafissa Cherouati | Algeria |

The women's 1500 metre freestyle event at the 2015 African Games took place on 11 September 2015 at Kintele Aquatic Complex.

== Schedule ==
All times are Congo Standard Time (UTC+01:00)

| Date | Time | Event |
|---|---|---|
| Friday, 11 September 2015 | 17:50 | Final |

== Results ==
=== Final ===
| Rank | Athlete | Time | Notes |
|---|---|---|---|
| 1st place, gold medalist(s) | Majda Chebaraka (ALG) | 17:07.82 | |
| 2nd place, silver medalist(s) | Charlise Oberholzer (RSA) | 17:11.34 | |
| 3rd place, bronze medalist(s) | Souad Nafissa Cherouati (ALG) | 17:18.35 | |
| 4 | Talita Marie Te Flan (CIV) | 17:25.19 | |
| 5 | Roaia Mashaly (EGY) | 17:40.97 | |
| 6 | Reem Kaseem (EGY) | 17:54.32 | |
| 7 | Asma Ben Boukhatem (TUN) | 18:17.32 | |
