= Karate at the 2015 African Games =

Karate competitions

- Location: Republic of the Congo; Brazzaville
- Dates: 5-7 September

Karate at the 2015 African Games in Brazzaville was held between September 4–6, 2015.

== Results ==
=== Women's Kata ===
- (gold) Manal Kamilia Hadj Said (ALG)
- (silver) Sarah Sayed (EGY)
- (bronze) Maxine Willemse (RSA)
- (bronze) Sylvie Viviane Ambani (CMR)

=== Women's Kumite -50 KG ===
- (gold) Lydia Besbes (ALG)
- (silver) Lame Hetanang (BOT)
- (bronze) Radwa Sayed (EGY)
- (bronze) Cynthia Oyono Nisame (GAB)

=== Women's Kumite -55 KG ===
- (gold) Yasmin Attia (EGY)
- (silver) Mariane Ndiaye (SEN)
- (bronze) Mylene Oceanne Ganiero (BEN)
- (bronze) Thato Malunga (BOT)

=== Women's Kumite -61 KG ===
- (gold) Giana Lotfy (EGY)
- (silver) Saïda Djedra (ALG)
- (bronze) Rosine Joelle Tchuako (CMR)
- (bronze) Boutheina Hasnaoui (TUN)

=== Women's Kumite -68 KG ===
- (gold) Lamya Matoub (ALG)
- (silver) Meghan Booyens (RSA)
- (bronze) Merilynn Manthe (BOT)
- (bronze) Radwa Abdelsalam (EGY)

=== Women's Kumite +68 KG ===
- (gold) Mame Fatou Thiaw (SEN)
- (silver) Imene Atif (ALG)
- (bronze) Nina Youlou (CGO)
- (bronze) Aissa Faten (TUN)

=== Women's Team Kata ===
- (gold) Algeria
- (silver) Egypt
- (bronze) Botswana
- (bronze) Nigeria

=== Women's Team Kumite ===
- (gold) Algeria
- (silver) Senegal
- (bronze) Nigeria
- (bronze) Egypt

=== Men's Kata ===
- (gold) Ahmed Shawky (EGY)
- (silver) Outis Mouad (ALG)
- (bronze) Michael Du Plessis (RSA)
- (bronze) Ofentse Bakwadi (BOT)

=== Men's Kumite -60 KG ===
- (gold) Innocent Okemba (CGO)
- (silver) Abdelkrim Bouamria (ALG)
- (bronze) Balungile Ngcofe (RSA)
- (bronze) Nader Azzouzi (TUN)

=== Men's Kumite -67 KG ===
- (gold) Abdelatif Benkhaled (ALG)
- (silver) Dieudonne Mba Minisa Dany (GAB)
- (bronze) Ali Elsawy (EGY)
- (bronze) Jan Adriann Booyens (RSA)

=== Men's Kumite -75 KG ===
- (gold) Omar Abdel Rahman (EGY)
- (silver) Sandile Makgwali (RSA)
- (bronze) Adonai Mayinguidi (CGO)
- (bronze) El Hadji Ibrahima Mbaye (SEN)

=== Men's Kumite -84 KG ===
- (gold) Innocent Yves Andegue Mbia (CMR)
- (silver) Mouâd Achache (ALG)
- (bronze) Diego Mez Davy (CGO)
- (bronze) Mouhamed Diagne (SEN)

=== Men's Kumite +84 KG ===
- (gold) Dualde Malonga Kiminou (CGO)
- (silver) Ahmed Elasfar (EGY)
- (bronze) Ali Amin Adel Soliman (LBA)
- (bronze) Etienne Martial Nonagni Bayomog (CMR)

=== Men's Team Kata ===
- (gold) Egypt
- (silver) Algeria
- (bronze) South Africa
- (bronze) Republic of the Congo

=== Men's Team Kumite ===
- (gold) Egypt
- (silver) Algeria
- (bronze) Republic of the Congo
- (bronze) Senegal

== Medal table ==
As of September 08, 2015

Rank	Nation	Gold	Silver	Bronze	Total
1	Algeria (ALG)	6	7	0	13
2	Egypt (EGY)	6	3	4	13
3	Republic of the Congo (CGO)	2	0	5	7
4	Senegal (SEN)	1	2	3	6
5	Cameroon (CMR)	1	0	3	4
6	South Africa (RSA)	0	2	5	7
7	Botswana (BOT)	0	1	4	5
8	Gabon (GAB)	0	1	1	2
9	Tunisia (TUN)	0	0	3	3
10	Nigeria (NGR)	0	0	2	2
11	Benin (BEN)	0	0	1	1
11	Libya (LBA)	0	0	1	1
Totals (12 entries)		16	16	32	64
