= Swimming at the 2015 African Games – Men's 200 metre breaststroke =

Swimming event

Men's 200 metre breaststroke at the 2015 African Games
- Venue: Kintele Aquatic Complex
- Date: September 9, 2015
- Competitors: 11 from 9 nations

Medalists
gold medal	Ayrton Sweeney	South Africa
silver medal	Wassim Elloumi	Tunisia
bronze medal	Youssef El Kamash	Egypt

The Men's 200 metre breaststroke event at the 2015 African Games took place on 9 September 2015 at Kintele Aquatic Complex.

== Schedule ==
All times are Congo Standard Time (UTC+01:00)

Date	Time	Event
Wednesday, 9 September 2015	10:27	Heat 1
Wednesday, 9 September 2015	10:31	Heat 2
Wednesday, 9 September 2015	17:38	Final

== Results ==
=== Heats ===
The heats were held on 9 September.

=== Final ===
The final were held on 9 September.

Rank	Athlete	Time	Notes
1st place, gold medalist(s)	Ayrton Sweeney (RSA)	2:14.41	
2nd place, silver medalist(s)	Wassim Elloumi (TUN)	2:17.80	
3rd place, bronze medalist(s)	Youssef El Kamash (EGY)	2:19.03	
4	Abdelkader Mohamme Afane (ALG)	2:21.75	
5	Mohamed Eissa (EGY)	2:21.88	
6	James Lawson (ZIM)	2:22.52	
7	Edward Johannisen (RSA)	2:28.02	
8	Ahllan Bique (MOZ)	2:47.57	
