= Swimming at the 2015 African Games – Men's 100 metre backstroke =

Men's 100 metre backstroke at the 2015 African Games
- Venue: Kintele Aquatic Complex
- Date: September 10, 2015
- Competitors: 16 from 11 nations

Medalists
gold medal	Richard Ellis	South Africa
silver medal	David de Villiers	South Africa
bronze medal	Mohamed Samy	Egypt

The Men's 100 metre backstroke event at the 2015 African Games took place on 10 September 2015 at Kintele Aquatic Complex.

== Schedule ==
All times are Congo Standard Time (UTC+01:00)

Date	Time	Event
Thursday, 10 September 2015	10:18	Heat 1
Thursday, 10 September 2015	10:21	Heat 2
Thursday, 10 September 2015	17:52	Final

== Results ==
=== Heats ===
The heats were held on 10 September.

=== Final ===
The final were held on 10 September.

Rank	Athlete	Time	Notes
1st place, gold medalist(s)	Richard Ellis (RSA)	55.83	
2nd place, silver medalist(s)	David de Villiers (RSA)	55.84	
3rd place, bronze medalist(s)	Mohamed Samy (EGY)	56.31	
4	Mohamed Khaled (EGY)	56.50	
5	Riyad Djendouci (ALG)	59.43	
6	Hamdan Bayusuf (KEN)	1:00.47	
7	Mohamed Ali Chaouachi (TUN)	1:02.26	
8	BAKALE Emile Rony (CGO)	1:02.63	
