= Fencing at the 2015 African Games =

- Location: Republic of the Congo; Brazzaville
- Dates: 2–6 September

Fencing at the 2015 African Games in Brazzaville was held between September 2–6, 2015.

== Medal summary ==
=== Medal table ===
Rank	Nation	Gold	Silver	Bronze	Total
1	Egypt (EGY)	7	4	9	20
2	Tunisia (TUN)	4	4	2	10
3	South Africa (RSA)	1	0	0	1
4	Algeria (ALG)	0	3	2	5
5	Senegal (SEN)	0	1	4	5
6	Mali (MLI)	0	0	1	1
Totals (6 entries)		12	12	18	42

=== Results ===
Event	Gold	Silver	Bronze
Men's Individual Foil	Alaaeldin Abouelkassem (EGY)	Roman Djitli (ALG)	Mohamed Ayoub Ferjani (TUN); Mohamed Essam (EGY)
Men's Individual Sabre	Fares Ferjani (TUN)	Hichem Samandi (TUN)	Ziad Elsissy (EGY); Ahmed Ehab (EGY)
Men's Individual Epee	Ahmed Elsaghir (EGY)	Ayman Mohamed Fayez (EGY)	Mohannad Saif (EGY); Babacar Kadam (SEN)
Men's Team Sabre	Egypt	Tunisia	Senegal
Men's Team Foil	Egypt	Tunisia	Algeria
Men's Team Epee	Egypt	Senegal	Mali
Women's Individual Epee	Sarra Besbes (TUN)	Ayah Mahdy (EGY)	Nardin Ehab (EGY); Nourhan Desouky (EGY)
Women's Individual Foil	Ines Boubakri (TUN)	Haifa Jabri (TUN)	Anissa Khalfaoui (ALG); Hadil Elsharkawy (EGY)
Women's Individual Sabre	Mennatalla Ahmed (EGY)	Mariam El Sway (EGY)	Ndeye Fatou Thiam (SEN); Nour Montaser (EGY)
Women's Team Foil	Tunisia	Algeria	Egypt
Women's Team epee	South Africa	Egypt	Tunisia
Women's Team Sabre	Egypt	Algeria	Senegal
