= Clayton Jimmie =

South African swimmer (born 1995)

Personal information
- Born: 10 July 1995 (age 31) Durban, South Africa
- Height: 1.91 m (6 ft 3 in)
- Weight: 72 kg (159 lb)

Sport
- Sport: Swimming
Medal record
Men's swimming
Representing South Africa
Commonwealth Games
Silver medal – second place	2014 Glasgow	4×100 m freestyle
Bronze medal – third place	2014 Glasgow	4×100 m medley
African Games
Gold medal – first place	2015 Brazzaville	100 m freestyle
Gold medal – first place	2015 Brazzaville	4×100 m freestyle
Gold medal – first place	2015 Brazzaville	4×100 m mixed freestyle
Silver medal – second place	2015 Brazzaville	4×100 m medley
Bronze medal – third place	2015 Brazzaville	50 m freestyle
African Championships
Gold medal – first place	2021 Accra	50 m butterfly
Gold medal – first place	2022 Tunis	50 m freestyle
Gold medal – first place	2022 Tunis	50 m backstroke
Gold medal – first place	2022 Tunis	50 m butterfly
Gold medal – first place	2024 Luanda	100 m freestyle
Gold medal – first place	2024 Luanda	4×100 m mixed medley
Silver medal – second place	2022 Tunis	100 m freestyle
Silver medal – second place	2024 Luanda	4×100 m medley
Bronze medal – third place	2021 Accra	100 m freestyle
Bronze medal – third place	2022 Tunis	100 m butterfly
Bronze medal – third place	2024 Luanda	50 m freestyle

Clayton Jimmie (born 10 July 1995) is a South African swimmer. He competed in the men's 4 × 100 metre freestyle relay event at the 2017 World Aquatics Championships.

In April 2022, at the 2022 South Africa National Swimming Championships, Jimmie won the bronze medal in the 50 metre freestyle with a time of 22.82 seconds, achieved a qualifying time for the 2022 World Aquatics Championships in the event and was named to the South Africa roster in the event for the 2022 World Championships. On day five of the World Championships, held at Danube Arena in Budapest, Hungary, he placed 55th in the 100 metre freestyle with a time of 50.68 seconds. Later in the same prelims session, he placed eighteenth in the 4×100 metre mixed medley relay, splitting a 56.05 for the butterfly leg of the relay. Two days later, he placed 43rd in the 50 metre freestyle with a time of 22.74 seconds.

At the 2022 Commonwealth Games, held in Birmingham, England in July and August, Jimmie qualified for the semifinals of the 50 metre butterfly ranking 16th with a time of 24.17 seconds in the preliminaries. Later in the same preliminaries session, he was part of the South Africa relay team that was disqualified in the 4×100 metre mixed freestyle relay. For the semifinals of the 50 metre butterfly later the same day, he did not advance to the final, placing seventh in his semifinal heat. The following day, he helped qualify the 4×100 metre freestyle relay to the final ranking sixth, splitting a 50.28 for the second leg of the relay in the morning preliminaries. In the evening final, he lowered his split time for the second leg of the relay to a 50.12 to contribute to a time of 3:23.41 and sixth-place finish.

Day five of competition at the 2022 Commonwealth Games, Jimmie ranked fourteenth in the preliminaries of the 50 metre freestyle with a time of 22.98 seconds, qualifying for the semifinals. He placed eleventh in the semifinals with a time of 22.62 seconds.
