= Samson Opuakpo =

Nigerian swimmer

Personal information
- Full name: Samson Focados Opuakpo
- National team: Nigeria
- Born: 24 April 1986 (age 40) Delta State, Nigeria
- Weight: 70 kg (150 lb)

Sport
- Sport: Swimming
- Strokes: Backstroke, freestyle

Samson Samuel Opuakpo Forcados is professional swimmer in Nigeria who competes internationally for his country and a backstroke and freestyle swimmer. He currently holds the top backstroke and distance freestyler record in Nigeria.

His last result was

| 2016 | Olympic Games | Rio de Janeiro, Brazil | 59th (h) | 50 m freestyle | 24.85 |

The swimming competitions at the 2016 Summer Olympics in Rio de Janeiro took place from 6 to 13 August at the Olympic Aquatics Stadium.

== Major results ==
=== Individual ===
==== Long course ====
| Year | Competition | Venue | Position | Event | Notes |
Representing Nigeria
| 2009 | World Championships | Rome, Italy | 121st (h) | 50 m freestyle | 24.62 |
| 2009 | World Championships | Rome, Italy | 145th (h) | 100 m freestyle | 54.28 |
| 2009 | World Championships | Rome, Italy | 85th (h) | 50 m backstroke | 28.57 |
| 2009 | World Championships | Rome, Italy | 94th (h) | 100 m backstroke | 1:03.81 |
| 2011 | All-Africa Games | Maputo, Mozambique | 11th (h) | 50 m freestyle | 24.59 |
| 2011 | All-Africa Games | Maputo, Mozambique | 11th (h) | 100 m freestyle | 53.94 |
| 2011 | All-Africa Games | Maputo, Mozambique | 6th | 400 m freestyle | 4:28.38 |
| 2011 | All-Africa Games | Maputo, Mozambique | 6th | 50 m backstroke | 27.58 |
| 2011 | All-Africa Games | Maputo, Mozambique | 5th | 100 m backstroke | 1:01.19 |
| 2012 | African Championships | Nairobi, Kenya | 6th | 50 m freestyle | 23.83 |
| 2012 | African Championships | Nairobi, Kenya | 9th (h) | 100 m freestyle | 55.04 |
| 2012 | African Championships | Nairobi, Kenya | 5th | 50 m backstroke | 27.73 |
| 2012 | African Championships | Nairobi, Kenya | 9th (h) | 100 m backstroke | 1:03.90 |
| 2013 | World Championships | Barcelona, Spain | - | 100 m freestyle | DSQ |
| 2013 | World Championships | Barcelona, Spain | - | 50 m backstroke | DSQ |
| 2015 | World Championships | Kazan, Russia | 76th (h) | 50 m freestyle | 25.02 |
| 2015 | World Championships | Kazan, Russia | 57th (h) | 50 m backstroke | 28.70 |
| 2015 | African Games | (Republic of the Congo) Brazzaville, Congo | 16th (h) | 50 m freestyle | 24.76 |
| 2015 | African Games | (Republic of the Congo) Brazzaville, Congo | 14th (h) | 100 m freestyle | 54.23 |
| 2015 | African Games | (Republic of the Congo) Brazzaville, Congo | 9th (h) | 50 m backstroke | 28.91 |
| 2015 | African Games | (Republic of the Congo) Brazzaville, Congo | 13th (h) | 100 m backstroke | 1:04.50 |
| 2016 | Olympic Games | Rio de Janeiro, Brazil | 59th (h) | 50 m freestyle | 24.85 |

==== Short course ====
| Year | Competition | Venue | Position | Event | Notes |
Representing Nigeria
| 2012 | World Championships | Istanbul, Turkey | 74th (h) | 50 m freestyle | 23.82 |
| 2012 | World Championships | Istanbul, Turkey | 82nd (h) | 100 m freestyle | 52.18 |
| 2012 | World Championships | Istanbul, Turkey | 45th (h) | 50 m backstroke | 26.17 |
| 2012 | World Championships | Istanbul, Turkey | 52nd (h) | 100 m backstroke | 59.17 |
| 2012 | World Championships | Istanbul, Turkey | 63rd (h) | 50 m butterfly | 25.72 |

=== Relay ===
==== Long course ====
| Year | Competition | Venue | Position | Event | Notes |
Representing Nigeria
| 2009 | World Championships | Rome, Italy | 30th (h) | 4 × 100 m freestyle | 3:41.39 |
| 2011 | All-Africa Games | Maputo, Mozambique | 5th | 4 × 100 m freestyle | 3:39.66 |
| 2011 | All-Africa Games | Maputo, Mozambique | 7th | 4 × 200 m freestyle | 8:30.61 |
| 2011 | All-Africa Games | Maputo, Mozambique | 5th | 4 × 100 m medley | 3:59.66 |
