= Volleyball at the 2015 African Games – Men's tournament =

Tournament details
- Host country: Republic of the Congo
- Dates: 2–14 September
- Teams: 12
- Venue: 1 (in Brazzaville host cities)

Final positions
- Champions: Algeria (2nd title)

The Men's tournament of the volleyball competition of the 2015 African Games was held from September 4–15, 2015 in Brazzaville.

== Teams ==
- Algeria
- Egypt
- Cameroon
- Cape Verde
- Ghana
- Rwanda
- Congo
- Nigeria
- Botswana
- Gambia
- Mozambique
- Seychelles

== Preliminary round ==
Source :

=== Group A ===
Pos	Team	Pld	W	L	Pts	SW	SL	SR	SPW	SPL	SPR	Qualification
1	Congo	4	4	0	11	12	3	4.000	354	305	1.161	Semifinals
2	Egypt	4	3	1	10	11	4	2.750	368	310	1.187	Semifinals
3	Nigeria	4	2	2	6	8	6	1.333	334	304	1.099	
4	Mozambique	4	1	3	3	3	9	0.333	225	295	0.763	
5	Botswana	4	0	4	0	0	12	0.000	246	313	0.786	
6	Gambia	0	0	0	0	0	0	—	0	0	—	

Date		Score		Set 1	Set 2	Set 3	Set 4	Set 5	Total
2 Sep	Egypt	3–0	Mozambique	25–14	25–22	25–14	–	–	75–48
3 Sep	Nigeria	3–0	Botswana	25–18	25–22	25–15	–	–	75–55
3 Sep	Congo	wo	Gambia	–	–	–	–	–	–
5 Sep	Egypt	3–0	Botswana	25–14	25–20	38–36	–	–	88–70
5 Sep	Mozambique	wo	Gambia	–	–	–	–	–	–
5 Sep	Nigeria	1–3	Congo	20–25	27–29	25–19	23–25	–	95–98
7 Sep	Nigeria	3–0	Mozambique	25–17	25–20	25–15	–	–	75–52
7 Sep	Egypt	wo	Gambia	–	–	–	–	–	–
7 Sep	Botswana	0–3	Congo	19–25	16–25	19–25	–	–	54–75
9 Sep	Mozambique	0–3	Congo	14–25	10–25	26–28	–	–	50–78
9 Sep	Botswana	wo	Gambia	–	–	–	–	–	–
9 Sep	Egypt	3–1	Nigeria	25–21	24–26	25–21	25–21	–	99–89
11 Sep	Botswana	0–3	Mozambique	23–25	21–25	23–25	–	–	50–44
11 Sep	Egypt	2–3	Congo	21–25	25–19	25–19	22–25	13–15	106–103
11 Sep	Nigeria	wo	Gambia	–	–	–	–	–	–

=== Group B ===
Pos	Team	Pld	W	L	Pts	SW	SL	SR	SPW	SPL	SPR	Qualification
1	Algeria	5	5	0	14	15	4	3.750	467	367	1.272	Semifinals
2	Rwanda	5	3	2	10	12	8	1.500	462	463	0.998	Semifinals
3	Cameroon	5	3	2	9	11	7	1.571	443	384	1.154	
4	Ghana	5	3	2	9	10	7	1.429	394	373	1.056	
5	Cape Verde	5	1	4	2	3	14	0.214	302	406	0.744	
6	Seychelles	5	0	5	1	4	15	0.267	372	447	0.832	

Date		Score		Set 1	Set 2	Set 3	Set 4	Set 5	Total
2 Sep	Seychelles	2–3	Cape Verde	21–25	25–22	25–18	23–25	12–15	106–105
2 Sep	Cameroon	3–0	Ghana	25–20	25–22	25–14	–	–	75–56
3 Sep	Algeria	3–2	Rwanda	27–29	25–17	25–19	24–26	15–10	116–101
6 Sep	Rwanda	1–3	Ghana	20–25	27–29	25–22	27–25	–	97–103
6 Sep	Algeria	3–0	Seychelles	25–16	25–10	25–16	–	–	75–42
6 Sep	Cameroon	3–0	Cape Verde	25–16	25–14	25–16	–	–	75–46
8 Sep	Cape Verde	0–3	Ghana	20–25	17–25	16–25	–	–	53–75
8 Sep	Algeria	3–1	Cameroon	29–27	27–25	24–26	25–21	–	105–99
8 Sep	Rwanda	3–1	Seychelles	25–23	25–23	19–25	25–19	–	94–90
10 Sep	Seychelles	0–3	Ghana	15–25	14–25	23–25	–	–	52–75
10 Sep	Cameroon	1–3	Rwanda	25–16	27–29	23–25	21–25	–	96–95
10 Sep	Algeria	3–0	Cape Verde	25–8	25–15	25–17	–	–	75–40
12 Sep	Algeria	3–1	Ghana	21–25	25–17	25–20	25–23	–	96–85
12 Sep	Rwanda	3–0	Cape Verde	25–17	25–23	25–18	–	–	75–58
12 Sep	Cameroon	3–1	Seychelles	25–22	23–25	5–15	25–20	–	98–82

== Final round ==
=== Semifinals ===
Date		Score		Set 1	Set 2	Set 3	Set 4	Set 5	Total
13 Sep	Congo	3–1	Rwanda	25–23	20–25	25–18	25–23	–	95–89
13 Sep	Algeria	3–2	Egypt	25–16	20–25	19–25	25–18	15–6	104–90

=== Third place game ===
Date		Score		Set 1	Set 2	Set 3	Set 4	Set 5	Total
14 Sep	Egypt	3–2	Rwanda	25–27	26–24	24–26	25–17	15–13	115–107

=== Final ===
Date		Score		Set 1	Set 2	Set 3	Set 4	Set 5	Total
14 Sep	Algeria	3–0	Congo	25–20	25–22	27–25	–	–	77–67

== See also ==
- Volleyball at the 2015 African Games – Women's tournament
