= Naomi Ruele =

Botswana swimmer (born 1997)

Personal information
- Full name: Naomi Qutilah Keneilwe Ruele
- Nationality: Botswana
- Born: 13 January 1997 (age 29) Gaborone, Botswana

Sport
- Sport: Swimming
- College team: Florida International University
Medal record
Women's swimming
Representing Botswana
African Games
Silver medal – second place	2015 Brazzaville	50 m backstroke
Silver medal – second place	2019 Rabat	100 m backstroke
Bronze medal – third place	2019 Rabat	50 m backstroke

Naomi Ruele (born 13 January 1997) is a Botswana swimmer. She competed in the women's 50 metre freestyle event at the 2016 Summer Olympics where she ranked at #47 with a time of 26.23 seconds. She also swims for Florida International University, and has been named the Conference USA swimmer of the year with wins in the 50 free in a time of 22.11, 100 free in a time of 48.45 and 100 back in a time of 52.42.

== Early life ==
Naomi Ruele was born on 13 January 1997 in Gaborone, Botswana. She attended the Maru a Pula School.

== Swimming career ==
She was the first Motswana swimmer to qualify for the Youth Olympic Games, competing at Nanjing, China, in 2014 in the girls' 50 metre backstroke and 100 metre backstroke. She finished third in the 100 metre with a new personal best time of 1:04:2. Based on her time, she did not qualify for the semi-finals. She swam in the second heat of the 50 metre competition, finishing with a time of 29.86 seconds, one place outside of qualifying for the semi-finals as her time was 0.02 seconds slower than the swimmer in the 16th position.

Ruele won a bronze medal competing in the 50 metre backstroke at the 2014 South African swimming championships, also placing fifth in the 100 metre backstroke. She set personal bests of 27.42 seconds and 1:01:81 in the 50 metre and 100 metre freestyle respectively. While attending Florida International University, she was named the 2015/16 Conference USA swimmer of the year after finishing in first place in the 50 metre freestyle 12 times. At the Conference USA championships, she recorded a time of 22.33 seconds in the preliminary round and set a record of 22.23 seconds in the final. She swam in a further six events at the championships, three individually and four as part of a relay team. She won each time, for a total of seven gold medals, setting a further two records for her University in the 100 metre freestyle and the 200 metre freestyle relay.

Ruele swam for Florida International University from the years of 2015-2019. In her 4 years competing for the University she qualified for the NCAA Division 1 Women's Swimming and Diving Championships consecutively. She has been named Conference USA Swimmer of the Year 3 out of 4 times in her swimming career at Florida International University, having collected medals and records in the 50 freestyle, 100 freestyle and 100 backstroke individually, as well as helping her squad to podium places in the 400 Free Relay, 400 Medley Relay, 200 Medley Relay and 200 Free Relay.

She holds the Florida International University records in the 50 freestyle and 100 backstroke respectively. She was named by Botswana Youth publication as one of Botswana's Top 30 Under 30 Inspirational Youth.

=== Olympics ===
Ruele qualified for the 2016 Summer Olympics in Rio de Janeiro at the swimming meet at the Georgia Institute of Technology on 20 March 2016; she recorded a time of 26.07 seconds. This performance placed her inside the "B" qualifying time of 26.17, and she received a letter on 8 July stating that she had been chosen to represent Botswana. It marked the first occasion that Botswana had chosen more than one female athlete in a single Olympics team.

Around the same time as her selection, Ruele was named as the Junior Female Sportsperson of the Year by the Botswana National Sports Council. Competing at the Olympic Aquatics Stadium in Rio on 12 August in the women's 50 metre freestyle, she finished in second place in her heat with a time of 26.23 seconds. This meant that she finished 47th overall, and so failed to qualify for the following round.
