= Peter Wetzlar =

Zimbabwean swimmer

Personal information
- Born: 27 February 1997 (age 29) Harare, Zimbabwe

Sport
- Sport: Swimming
- College team: University of Kentucky

Peter Wetzlar (born 27 February 1997) is a Zimbabwean swimmer. He attended Westville Boys' High School in Durban, South Africa and the University of Kentucky. He competed in the men's 100 metre freestyle event at the 2017 World Aquatics Championships.

In 2019, Wetzlar represented Zimbabwe at the 2019 World Aquatics Championships held in Gwangju, South Korea, and he finished in 44th place in the heats in the men's 50 metre freestyle event. In the men's 100 metre freestyle he finished in 56th place in the heats.

Wetzlar competed at the 2020 Summer Olympics.
