= Souad Cherouati =

Algerian swimmer (born 1989)

Personal information
- Full name: Souad Nefissa Cherouati
- Nationality: Algerian
- Born: 10 February 1989 (age 37)

Sport
- Sport: Swimming
- Club: Benfica
Medal record
Women's swimming
Representing Algeria
African Games
Silver medal – second place	2015 Brazzaville	400 m medley
Bronze medal – third place	2015 Brazzaville	1500 m freestyle
Bronze medal – third place	2015 Brazzaville	4×200 m freestyle
Bronze medal – third place	2015 Brazzaville	4×100 m mixed freestyle
African Championships
Gold medal – first place	2016 Bloemfontein	800 m freestyle
Gold medal – first place	2016 Bloemfontein	4×100 m freestyle
Gold medal – first place	2018 Algiers	5 km open water
Silver medal – second place	2006 Dakar	400 m medley
Silver medal – second place	2006 Dakar	4×200 m freestyle
Silver medal – second place	2016 Bloemfontein	400 m freestyle
Silver medal – second place	2016 Bloemfontein	1500 m freestyle
Silver medal – second place	2016 Bloemfontein	4×200 m freestyle
Silver medal – second place	2016 Bloemfontein	5 km open water
Silver medal – second place	2018 Algiers	800 m freestyle
Silver medal – second place	2018 Algiers	1500 m freestyle
Bronze medal – third place	2006 Dakar	4×100 m freestyle
Bronze medal – third place	2016 Bloemfontein	200 m freestyle
Bronze medal – third place	2016 Bloemfontein	4×100 m medley
Bronze medal – third place	2016 Bloemfontein	4×100 m mixed freestyle
Bronze medal – third place	2018 Algiers	400 m freestyle
Bronze medal – third place	2018 Algiers	4×100 m freestyle
Islamic Solidarity Games
Gold medal – first place	2017 Baku	400 m freestyle
Gold medal – first place	2017 Baku	800 m freestyle
Gold medal – first place	2017 Baku	1500 m freestyle

Souad Nefissa Cherouati (born 10 February 1989) is an Algerian swimmer. She competed in the women's 1500 metre freestyle event at the 2017 World Aquatics Championships.

== Career ==
In 2019, she represented Algeria at the 2019 World Aquatics Championships held in Gwangju, South Korea. She competed in the women's 800 metre freestyle and women's 1500 metre freestyle events. In both events she did not advance to compete in the final.

She competed at the 2020 Summer Olympics in the women's marathon 10 km.
