= Denilson da Costa =

Mozambican swimmer

Personal information
- Nationality: Mozambican
- Born: 7 March 1998 (age 28) Maputo, Mozambique

Sport
- Sport: Swimming
- Club: Tubarões

Denilson da Costa (born 7 March 1998) is a Mozambican swimmer. He competed in the men's 50 metre butterfly event at the 2017 World Aquatics Championships.
