= Nazim Belkhodja =

Algerian swimmer (born 1990)

Personal information
- Born: 1 February 1990 (age 36)

Sport
- Sport: Swimming

Nazim Belkhodja (born 1 February 1990) is an Algerian swimmer. He competed in the men's 50 metre butterfly event at the 2017 World Aquatics Championships. He also competed at the 2015 African Games.
