= Rebecca Kamau =

Kenyan swimmer

Personal information
- Full name: Rebecca Wacui Kamau
- Nationality: Kenyan
- Born: 21 July 1999 (age 27)

Sport
- Sport: Swimming
- Strokes: Breaststroke; Individual medley
Medal record
Women's swimming
Representing Kenya
African Games
Bronze medal – third place	2019 Rabat	4×100 m medley relay

Rebecca Kamau (born 21 July 1999) is a Kenyan swimmer. She competed in the women's 100 metre breaststroke event at the 2017 World Aquatics Championships. In 2019, she represented Kenya at the 2019 African Games held in Rabat, Morocco and she won the bronze medal in the women's 4 × 100 metre medley relay.
