= Sylvia Brunlehner =

Kenyan swimmer

Personal information
- Full name: Sylvia Tanya Atieno Brunlehner
- Born: 13 February 1994 (age 32)
- Height: 182 cm (6 ft 0 in)

Sport
- Sport: Swimming
- Coach: Benedikt Schubert
Medal record
Women's swimming
Representing Kenya
African Games
Bronze medal – third place	2019 Rabat	4x100m medley relay

Sylvia Tanya Atieno Brunlehner (born 13 February 1994) is a Kenyan swimmer who has competed at several international competitions. Her sister is Maria Brunlehner.

She has represented Kenya in the following events:

- FINA World Championships: Roma 2009 (LC), Dubai 2010 (SC), Shanghai 2011 (LC), Istanbul 2012 (SC), Barcelona 2013 (LC), Windsor 2016 (SC)
- Commonwealth Games: Delhi 2010, Glasgow 2014, Gold Coast 2018
- Youth Commonwealth Games: Pune 2008 (LC)
- Youth Olympic Games: Singapore 2010 (LC)
- All-African Games: Algeria 2007 (LC), Mozambique 2011 (LC)Rabat 2019 (LC)
- African Championships: South Africa 2008 (LC), Morocco 2010 (LC)
- Africans Junior Championships: Mauritius 2010 (LC)
- African Youth Games: Morocco 2010 (LC)
- ITU Triathlon: Mauritius 2005, Zimbabwe 2010
