= Ghana at the 2015 African Games =

- Flag of Ghana
- IOC code: GHA
- NOC: Ghana Olympic Committee

in Brazzaville, Republic of the Congo 4 September 2015 – 19 September 2015
- Medals: Gold 0 Silver 0 Bronze 0 Total 0

African Games appearances
- 1965; 1973; 1978; 1987; 1991; 1995; 1999; 2003; 2007; 2011; 2015; 2019; 2023

Ghana competed at the 2015 African Games held in Brazzaville, Republic of the Congo.

== Medal summary ==
=== Medal table ===
Medal	Name	Sport	Event	Date
Gold	Women's team	Football	Women's tournament	
Bronze	Emmanuel Nartey	Judo	Men's 73 kg	

== Football ==
Ghana won the women's tournament.

== Judo ==
Emmanuel Nartey won one of the bronze medals in the men's 73 kg event.

== Swimming ==
Several swimmers represented Ghana at the 2015 African Games.
