= Sean Gunn (swimmer) =

Zimbabwean swimmer (born 1993)

Personal information
- Born: 23 December 1993 (age 32) Harare, Zimbabwe
- Height: 185 cm (6 ft 1 in)
- Weight: 80

Sport
- Sport: Swimming
- Strokes: Freestyle
- College team: University of Kentucky
Medal record
Men's swimming
Representing Zimbabwe
African Games
Bronze medal – third place	2015 Brazzaville	4×100 m mixed medley

Sean Michael Gunn (born 23 December 1993) is a Zimbabwean swimmer. He competed in the men's 100 metre freestyle event at the 2016 Summer Olympics.

== Personal life ==
In 2024, Gunn came out as a gay man.
