= Hamida Rania Nefsi =

Algerian swimmer (born 1997)

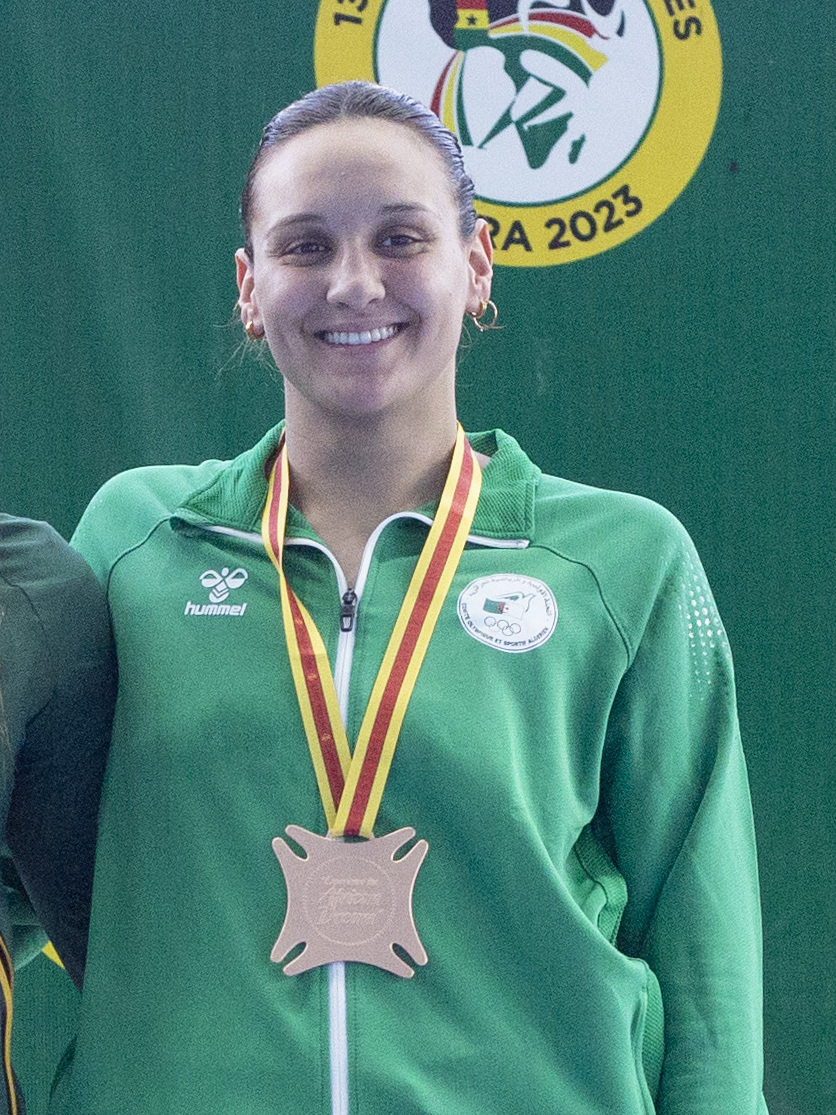
- 2023 African Games

Personal information
- Born: 17 November 1997 (age 28)

Sport
- Sport: Swimming
Medal record
Women's swimming
Representing Algeria
African Games
Gold medal – first place	2015 Brazzaville	400 m individual medley
Bronze medal – third place	2015 Brazzaville	4×200 m freestyle relay
Bronze medal – third place	2015 Brazzaville	4×100 m mixed freestyle
Silver medal – second place	2019 Rabat	200 m butterfly
Silver medal – second place	2019 Rabat	200 m individual medley
Silver medal – second place	2019 Rabat	400 m individual medley
Bronze medal – third place	2019 Rabat	4×400 m freestyle relay
Bronze medal – third place	2019 Rabat	4×200 m freestyle relay
Bronze medal – third place	2019 Rabat	4×100 m mixed freestyle relay
African Championships
Gold medal – first place	2024 Luanda	200 m individual medley
Gold medal – first place	2024 Luanda	400 m individual medley
Silver medal – second place	2022 Tunis	100 m breaststroke
Silver medal – second place	2022 Tunis	200 m breaststroke
Bronze medal – third place	2018 Algiers	200 m breaststroke
Bronze medal – third place	2024 Luanda	200 m breaststroke
Bronze medal – third place	2024 Luanda	4×200 m freestyle relay
Bronze medal – third place	2024 Luanda	4×100 m medley relay

Hamida Rania Nefsi (born 17 November 1997) is an Algerian swimmer.

She represented Algeria at the 2015 African Games and at the 2019 African Games. At the 2015 African Games she won one gold medal and two bronze medals and at the 2019 African Games she won three silver medals and three bronze medals.

At the 2018 African Swimming Championships held in Algiers, Algeria, she won the bronze medal in the women's 200 metre breaststroke event.

She represented Algeria at the 2022 Mediterranean Games held in Oran, Algeria.
