= Karin Prinsloo =

South African swimmer (born 1989)

Personal information
- Full name: Karin Prinsloo
- Nationality: South Africa
- Born: 2 December 1989 (age 36) Marble Hall, Limpopo, South Africa
- Height: 6 ft 0 in (183 cm)
- Weight: 154 lb (70 kg)

Sport
- Sport: Swimming
- Strokes: Backstroke, freestyle
- Club: Northern Tigers (University of Pretoria)
Medal record
All-Africa Games
Gold medal – first place	2011 Maputo	50 m freestyle
Gold medal – first place	2011 Maputo	100 m freestyle
Gold medal – first place	2011 Maputo	200 m freestyle
Gold medal – first place	2011 Maputo	50 m backstroke
Gold medal – first place	2011 Maputo	200 m butterfly
Gold medal – first place	2011 Maputo	4×100 m freestyle
Gold medal – first place	2011 Maputo	4×200 m freestyle
Gold medal – first place	2011 Maputo	4×100 m mixed medley
Gold medal – first place	2015 Brazzaville	200 m freestyle
Gold medal – first place	2015 Brazzaville	400 m freestyle
Gold medal – first place	2015 Brazzaville	4×100 m freestyle
Gold medal – first place	2015 Brazzaville	4×200 m freestyle
Gold medal – first place	2015 Brazzaville	4×100 m medley
Gold medal – first place	2015 Brazzaville	4×100 m mixed freestyle
Silver medal – second place	2011 Maputo	100 m backstroke
Silver medal – second place	2015 Brazzaville	50 m freestyle
Silver medal – second place	2015 Brazzaville	100 m freestyle
Silver medal – second place	2015 Brazzaville	100 m backstroke
Silver medal – second place	2015 Brazzaville	200 m backstroke
Silver medal – second place	2015 Brazzaville	4×100 m mixed medley

Karin Prinsloo (born 2 December 1989) is a South African swimmer. She was a member of the 2012 South Africa Olympic team, and competed in two individual events at the 2012 Summer Olympics in London.

== Personal life ==
Prinsloo was born in Marble Hall, Limpopo, in 1989 and she attended Ben Viljoen High School in Groblersdal, where she graduated in 2007.

Then she attended University of Pretoria in Pretoria, South Africa, where she is coached by Igor Omeltchenko.

== Swimming career ==
=== All Africa Games 2011 ===
Prinsloo narrowly missed out on the gold medal in the woman's 100 m backstroke, where she was up against African record holder Kirsty Coventry, of Zimbabwe. Coventry touched first in 1:00.86 with Prinsloo less than a second behind in 1:01.46 and Amel Melih, of Algeria, third in 1:07.27.

Prinsloo struck gold later as part of the women's 4 × 100 m relay team of Natasha de Vos, Roxanne Tammadge and Suzaan van Biljon.

=== 2012 Summer Olympics ===
At the 2012 Summer Olympics she finished 20th overall in the heats in the Women's 200 metre freestyle with a time of 1:59.24, and failed to reach the semifinals. She reached the finals of the 200 m backstroke, but was not fast enough to reach the final.

=== 2014 Commonwealth Games ===
At the 2014 Commonwealth Games, Prinsloo competed in the 100 m and 200 m freestyle, and the 4 × 100 m freestyle, 4 × 200 m freestyle and 4 × 100 m medley relays.

Awards
Preceded by (Zimbabwe) Kirsty Coventry	African Swimmer of the Year; 2013, 2014	Succeeded by (Zimbabwe) Kirsty Coventry
