= Nigeria at the 2015 African Games =

Nigeria at the 2015 All-Africa Games
- IOC code: NGR
- NOC: Nigerian Olympic Committee

in Brazzaville
- Competitors: 573 in 21 sports
- Flag bearer: Funke Oshonaike
- Medals Ranked 2nd: Gold 47 Silver 55 Bronze 42 Total 144

All-Africa Games appearances (overview)
- 1965; 1973; 1978; 1987; 1991; 1995; 1999; 2003; 2007; 2011; 2015; 2019; 2023; 2027

Youth appearances
- 2010; 2014

Nigeria participated at the 2015 All-Africa Games held in Brazzaville, Republic of the Congo. It participated with 573 athletes in 21 sports. Nigeria finished 2nd in the 2015 All-Africa Games medal table.

== Athletics ==
The following athletes competed for Nigeria in athletics and reached the finals.

Men
Athlete	Event	Place	Result	Notes
Ogho-Oghene Egwero	100 metres	2	10.17 seconds	
Seye Ogunlewe	100 metres	5	10.45s	
Nicholas Imhoaperamhe	100 metres	7	10.52s	
Divine Oduduru	200 metres	2	20.45s	
Tega Odele	200 metres	3	20.58s	
Obinna Metu	200 metres	5	20.74s	
Orukpe Erayokan	400 metres	6	45.73s	
Tyrone Akins	100m hurdles	3	13.54s	
Henry Okorie	400m hurdles	7	50.01s	
Samson Idiata	Long Jump	DSQ	7.83 metres	Disqualified for doping
Ezekiel Ewulo	Long Jump	6	7.39m	
Tosin Oke	Triple Jump	1	17.00m	
Olumide Olamigoke	Triple Jump	2	16.98	
Nathaniel Oghenewegba	4 × 400 m Relay	4	3:03.52	
Robert Simmonson	4 × 400 m Relay	4	3:03.52	
Henry Okorie	4 × 400 m Relay	4	3:03.52	
Orukpe Erayokan	4 × 400 m Relay	4	3:03.52	
Peter Moreno	Decathlon	7	6281	

Women
Athlete	Event	Place	Result	Notes
Cecilia Francis	100 metres	5	11.53 seconds	
Ngozi Onwumere	200 metres	2	23.24s	
Lawrette Ozoh	200 metres	3	23.37s	
Patience Okon George	400 metres	2	50.71s	
Adelowe Oluwatosin	400 metres	4	51.82s	
Margaret Etim	400 metres	5	52.64s	
Abike Egbeniyi	800 metres	8	2:09.36	
Amusan Oluwatobiloba	100m hurdles	1	13.15s	
Lindsay Lindley Weyinme	100m hurdles	3	13.3s	
Amaka Ogoegbunam	400m hurdles	1	55.86s	
Ajoke Odumonsu	400m hurdles	2	57.63s	
Doreen Amata	High Jump	2	1.85 metres	
Motunrayo Sasegbom	High Jump	5	1.80m	
Chinazom Amadi	Long Jump	DSQ	6.31m	Disqualified for doping
Eze Brume	Long Jump	4	6.23m	
Ibrhaim Blessing	Long Jump	9	5.84m	
Ibrhaim Blessing	Triple Jump	2	13.52m	
Hope Idhe	Triple Jump	6	12.90m	
Claire Uke	Shot Put	2	16.64m	
Claire Uke	Discus	1	54.25m	
Precious Ogunleye	Discus	4	48.18m	
Precious Ogunleye	Hammer Throw	5	58.84m	
Kelechi Nwanaga	Javelin	1	52.7m	
Cecila Francis	4 × 100 m relay	1	43.1s	
Blessing Okagbare	4 × 100 m relay	1	43.1s	
Ngozi Onwumere	4 × 100 m relay	1	43.1s	
Lawretta Ozoh	4 × 100 m relay	1	43.1s	
Rita Ossai	4 × 400 m relay	1	3:27.12	
Funke Oladoye	4 × 400 m relay	1	3:27.12	
Tosin Adeloye	4 × 400 m relay	1	3:27.12	
Patience Okon George	4 × 400 m relay	1	3:27.12	

== Badminton ==
The Nigerian National Badminton Team placed third, losing 0–3 to Mauritius in the Semifinal.

The following athletes/teams medaled for Nigeria.

Athlete	Event	Place
Grace Gabriel	Women's Singles	2
Clement Krobakpo	Men's Singles	3
Jinkan Ifraimu Ola Fagbemi	Men's Doubles	3
Enejoh Abah Victor Makanju	Men's Doubles	3
Grace Gabriel Maria Braimoh	Women's Doubles	3

== Basketball ==
The Men's team placed third after losing 60–61 to Egypt, and then beating Mali 57–55 in the third place match. The Women's team placed second after losing 57–73 to Mali in the final.

== Beach volleyball ==
The women's team beat South Africa 2–1 in the Final to claim gold.

== Cycling ==
The following athletes placed top ten in cycling for Nigeria.

Athlete	Event	Place	Time
Gladys Grikpa Tombrapa	Women's Road Race	2	1:45:10
Adejoku Durogbade	Women's Road Race	6	1:45:10
Grikpa Gladys Tombrapa	Women's Time Trial	5	NA
Emmanuel Innocent Akpan Qodiri Ajibade Eyo Effioke Kalizebe Caleb	Men's Team Time Trial	7	NA
Rosemary Marcus Grikpa Gladys Tombrapa Happy Okafor Glory Odiase	Women's Team Time Trial	3	NA

== Football ==
The men's team placed third after beating Congo in the 3rd place match. The game tied 0-0, and Nigeria won 5–3 in the penalty kick shootout. The woman's team placed 4th, losing the 3rd place match to Ivory Coast 1–2.
