= Majda Chebaraka =

Algerian swimmer (born 2000)

Personal information
- Born: 17 April 2000 (age 26)

Sport
- Sport: Swimming
Medal record
Women's swimming
Representing Algeria
African Games
Gold medal – first place	2015 Brazzaville	800 m freestyle
Gold medal – first place	2015 Brazzaville	1500 m freestyle
Silver medal – second place	2015 Brazzaville	400 m freestyle
Bronze medal – third place	2015 Brazzaville	200 m freestyle
Bronze medal – third place	2015 Brazzaville	4×200 m freestyle
Bronze medal – third place	2015 Brazzaville	4×100 m mixed freestyle
Bronze medal – third place	2019 Rabat	200 m freestyle
Bronze medal – third place	2019 Rabat	400 m freestyle
Bronze medal – third place	2019 Rabat	800 m freestyle
Bronze medal – third place	2019 Rabat	4×100 m freestyle
Bronze medal – third place	2019 Rabat	4×200 m freestyle
Bronze medal – third place	2019 Rabat	4×100 m mixed freestyle
African Championships
Gold medal – first place	2024 Luanda	4×100 m freestyle
Bronze medal – third place	2024 Luanda	4×200 m freestyle
Bronze medal – third place	2024 Luanda	4×100 m medley

Majda Chebaraka (born 17 April 2000) is an Algerian swimmer.

She competed at the 2016 Arab Swimming Championships and the 2018 African Swimming Championships.

She represented Algeria at the 2015 African Games and won two gold medals, one silver medal and three bronze medals. She won six bronze medals at the 2019 African Games.
