= Kenya at the 2015 African Games =

Kenya at the 2015 All-Africa Games
- IOC code: KEN
- NOC: National Olympic Committee of Kenya

in Brazzaville
- Competitors: 364 in 18 sports
- Medals Ranked 8th: Gold 6 Silver 9 Bronze 17 Total 32

All-Africa Games appearances (overview)
- 1965; 1973; 1978; 1987; 1991; 1995; 1999; 2003; 2007; 2011; 2015; 2019; 2023

Youth appearances
- 2010; 2014

Kenya, participated at the 2015 All-Africa Games held in the city of Brazzaville, in the Republic of the Congo. 364 athletes participated in 17 disciplines.

== Medal summary ==
=== Medal table ===
Medal	Name	Sport	Event	Date
1st place, gold medalist(s)	Clement Kemboi Kimutai (KEN)	Athletics	Men's 3000m steeplechase	13 September
1st place, gold medalist(s)	Margaret Chelimo Kipkemboi (KEN)	Athletics	Women's 5000m	13 September
1st place, gold medalist(s)	Kenya women's national volleyball team (KEN)	Volleyball	Women's tournament	14 September
1st place, gold medalist(s)	Grace Wanjiru Njue (KEN)	Athletics	Women's 20 km walk	15 September
1st place, gold medalist(s)	Alice Aprot Nawowuna (KEN)	Athletics	Women's 10,000m	16 September
1st place, gold medalist(s)	Raymond Kibet (KEN); Alex Sampao (KEN); Kiprono Koskei (KEN); Boniface Mweresa (KEN)	Athletics	Men's 4X400m relay	17 September
2nd place, silver medalist(s)	Hillary Kemboi Cheserek (KEN)	Athletics	Men's 3000m steeplechase	13 September
2nd place, silver medalist(s)	Rosemary Wanjiru (KEN)	Athletics	Women's 5000m	13 September
2nd place, silver medalist(s)	Leonard Barsoton (KEN)	Athletics	Men's 10,000m	14 September
2nd place, silver medalist(s)	Eunice Kadogo (KEN)	Athletics	Women's 100m	14 September
2nd place, silver medalist(s)	Annet Mwanzi (KEN)	Athletics	Women's 800m	14 September
2nd place, silver medalist(s)	Samuel Ireri Gathimba (KEN)	Athletics	Men's 20 km walk	15 September
2nd place, silver medalist(s)	Boniface Mweresa (KEN)	Athletics	Men's 400m	15 September
2nd place, silver medalist(s)	Luka Kanda (KEN)	Athletics	Men's half marathon	16 September
2nd place, silver medalist(s)	Gladys Kiptagelai (KEN)	Athletics	Women's 10,000m	16 September
3rd place, bronze medalist(s)	Mercy Joseph (KEN); Lavinia Martins (KEN)	Badminton	Women' doubles	8 September
3rd place, bronze medalist(s)	Mercy Apondi Obiero (KEN)	Weightlifting	Women' 69 kg snatch	9 September
3rd place, bronze medalist(s)	Mercy Apondi Obiero (KEN)	Weightlifting	Women' 69 kg clean & jerk	9 September
3rd place, bronze medalist(s)	Mercy Apondi Obiero (KEN)	Weightlifting	Women' 69 kg total	9 September
3rd place, bronze medalist(s)	Nick Okoth (KEN)	Boxing	Men's lightweight - 60 kg	10 September
3rd place, bronze medalist(s)	Elly Ajowi (KEN)	Boxing	Men's heavyweight - 91 kg	10 September
3rd place, bronze medalist(s)	Alice Aprot Nawowuna (KEN)	Athletics	Women's 5000m	13 September
3rd place, bronze medalist(s)	Purity Cherotich (KEN)	Athletics	Women's 3000m steeplechase	15 September
3rd place, bronze medalist(s)	Steper Wanboua (KEN)	Handisports	Men's 1500m, T45-46	15 September
3rd place, bronze medalist(s)	Hellen Nwawira Kariuki (KEN)	Powerlifting	Women's - 41 kg	15 September
3rd place, bronze medalist(s)	Job Kinyor (KEN)	Athletics	Men's 800m	16 September
3rd place, bronze medalist(s)	Hellen Syombua (KEN); Annet Mwanzi (KEN); Winnie Chebet (KEN); Maureen Nyatichi (KEN)	Athletics	Women's 4X400m relay	17 September
3rd place, bronze medalist(s)	Thomas Longosiwa (KEN)	Athletics	Men's 5000m	17 September
3rd place, bronze medalist(s)	Samuel Kimani (KEN)	Handisports	Men's 400m T11	17 September
3rd place, bronze medalist(s)	Beatrice Chepkoech (KEN)	Athletics	Women's 1500m	17 September
3rd place, bronze medalist(s)	Sammy Diego Nyongesa (KEN)	Wrestling	Men's GR 75 kg	18 September
3rd place, bronze medalist(s)	Holln Mkanga Ochieng (KEN)	Wrestling	Men's GR 130 kg	18 September

Medals by sport
Athletics	1st place, gold medalist(s)	2nd place, silver medalist(s)	3rd place, bronze medalist(s)	Total
Total	5	9	6	20
Badminton	1st place, gold medalist(s)	2nd place, silver medalist(s)	3rd place, bronze medalist(s)	Total
Total	0	0	1	1
Boxing	1st place, gold medalist(s)	2nd place, silver medalist(s)	3rd place, bronze medalist(s)	Total
Total	0	0	2	2
Volleyball	1st place, gold medalist(s)	2nd place, silver medalist(s)	3rd place, bronze medalist(s)	Total
Total	1	0	0	1
Weightlifting	1st place, gold medalist(s)	2nd place, silver medalist(s)	3rd place, bronze medalist(s)	Total
Total	0	0	3	3
Wrestling	1st place, gold medalist(s)	2nd place, silver medalist(s)	3rd place, bronze medalist(s)	Total
Total	0	0	2	2
Handisports	1st place, gold medalist(s)	2nd place, silver medalist(s)	3rd place, bronze medalist(s)	Total
Total	0	0	2	2
Powerlifting	1st place, gold medalist(s)	2nd place, silver medalist(s)	3rd place, bronze medalist(s)	Total
Total	0	0	1	1

Medals by date
Day	1st place, gold medalist(s)	2nd place, silver medalist(s)	3rd place, bronze medalist(s)	Total
8 September	0	0	1	1
9 September	0	0	3	3
10 September	0	0	2	2
13 September	2	2	1	5
14 September	1	3	0	4
15 September	1	2	3	6
16 September	1	2	1	4
17 September	1	0	4	5
18 September	0	0	2	2
19 September	0	0	0	0
Total	6	9	17	32
