= Kintélé Aquatic Complex =

Sports venue in the Republic of the Congo

- Kintélé Aquatic Complex
- Full name: Kintélé Aquatic Complex
- Location: Brazzaville, Republic of the Congo
- Capacity: 2,000

Tenant
- 2015 African Games

The Kintélé Aquatic Complex is a sports venue located in Brazzaville, Republic of the Congo. It is used for Swimming competitions. The venue was host to the swimming events of the 2015 African Games.
