= South Africa at the 2015 African Games =

South Africa at the 2015 All-Africa Games
- IOC code: RSA
- NOC: South African Sports Confederation and Olympic Committee
- Website: http://www.sascoc.co.za

in Brazzaville
- Competitors: 150 in 15 sports
- Flag bearer: Chad le Clos
- Medals Ranked 3rd: Gold 41 Silver 41 Bronze 40 Total 122

All-Africa Games appearances (overview)
- 1995; 1999; 2003; 2007; 2011; 2015; 2019; 2023

A team of more than 150 athletes flew the flag for South Africa at the 2015 All-Africa Games in Brazzaville, Republic of the Congo in September. South African athletes competed in a total of 15 different sports against their continental counterparts at the Games which ran 4–19 September while there was also representation by para-athletes in the power-lifting and athletics codes.

South African athletes participated in: athletics, badminton, basketball, boxing, cycling, fencing, gymnastics, judo, karate, swimming, table tennis, volleyball (beach), wrestling.

In total, 122 medals were won by South Africa.

== Athletics ==
- Men - Akani Simbine, Roscoe Engel, Henricho Bruintjies, Anaso Jobodwana, Wayde van Niekerk, Berend Koekemoer, Ofentse Mogowane, Mthembi Chauque, Rynardt van Rensburg, Johan Cronje, Dumisane Hlaselo, Stephen Mokoka, Antonio Alkana, Tshepo Lefete, Ruan de Vries, LJ van Zyl, Cornel Fredericks, Wouter Le roux, Lindsay Hanekom, Mpho Links, Chris Moleya, Eben Beukes, Ruswahl Samaai, Zarck Visser, Godfrey Khotso Mokoena, Orazio Cremona, Jaco Engelbrecht, Victor Hogan, Russell Tucker, Chris Harmse, Rocco van Rooyen, Philmar van Rensburg, Tobie Holtzhausen, Fredriech Pretorius, Willem Coertzen, Lebogang Shange, Wayne Snyman, Lusapho April
- Women - Carina Horn, Justine Palframan, Tamzin Thomas, Caster Semenya, Claudia Heunis, Wenda Nel, Annerie Ebersohn, Marilize Higgins, Julia du Plessis, Geraldine King, Deone Joubert, Jo-Ane Van Dyk, Bianca Erwee, Lynique Prinsloo, Matsi Dikotla, Patience Ntshingila, Sonia Smuts, Ischke Senekal, Geraldine Duvenage, Sunette Viljoen, Gezelle Bernard, Zinzi Chabangu, Nieka Du Toit, June Roelofse, Anel Oosthuizen, Corli Swart

== Para-athletics ==
- Men - Danie Breitenbach, Hilton Langenhoven, Jonathan Ntutu, Fanie van der Merwe, Gerrit Hendricks, Tyrone Pillay, Heugene Murray, Michael Louwrens, Christiaan du Plessis,
- Women - Ilse Hayes, Johanna Pretorius, Liezel Gouws, Carley Lomax
- Officials - Karin Le Roux, Raymond Julius, Marius Wessels

== Badminton ==
- Men - Jacob Maliekal, Andries Malan, Willem Viljoen, Prakash Vijayanath
- Women - Elsie de Villiers, Michelle Butler-Emmett, Jennifer Fry, Sandra le Grange
- Officials - Willie Joseph, Christoffer Dednam

== Boxing ==
- Men - Sibusiso Bandla, Ayabonga Sonjica, Luvuyo Sizani, Akani Phuzi, Paul Schafer
- Officials - Johannes Prinsloo, Nkosinathi Hlatshwayo

== Cycling ==
- Men - Hendrik Kruger, Reynard Butler, Thulasizwe Mxenge, Gustav Basson, Stefan de Bod, Emile Jacobs
- Women - Lise Olivier, Heidi Dalton, Anriette Schoeman, Zanele Tshoko
- Officials - Wimpie Gouws, David van Straaten, Brigitte Mileson

== Fencing ==
- Men - Robert McGregor, Alexander Collings, Mogamad Faai’q Gamieldien, Keith Sefularo, Sello Maduma, Joseph Maluleke, Thulani Manzini
- Women - Juliana Barret, Gisele Vicatos, Aphiwe Tuku, Tamaryn Carfoot
- Officials - Randall Daniels

== Gymnastics ==
- Men - Wilson Mafona, Terence Ledwaba, Ryan Patterson, Tiaan Grobler, Siphamandla Ngcobo
- Women - Dominique Mann, Kirsten Beckett, Claudia Cummins, Bianca Mann, Angela Maguire, Tylah Lotter
- Officials - Tseko Mogotsi, Alta Lategan, Ilse Laing, Andries Grobler

== Judo ==
- Men - Jacques van Zyl, Siyabulela Mabulu, Zack Piontek

== Karate ==
- Men - Michael du Plessis, Stefano Biagioni, Silvio Cerrone-Biagioni, Marius Madgwick, Jan Booysens, Sandile Makwali, Morgan Moss, Mphikeleli Mthimunye, Troy Futter, Theogran Pillay, Andre de Oliveira, Balungile Ncofe
- Women - Elsabe le Roux, Meghan Booyens, Noloyiso Bonga, Nicole Luther, Maxine Willemse
- Officials - Skosana Humphrey, Jody Young, Zachous Banyane

== Swimming ==
In the swimming code Olympic gold medallist Chad le Clos will be joined by fellow gold medallist Cameron van der Burgh who won two silver medals at the recent FINA world championships in Russia.

- Men - Alard Basson, Calvyn Justus, Alaric Basson, Chad le Clos, Martin Binedell, Daniel Marais, Myles Brown, Nico Meyer, David de Villiers, Caydon Muller, Richard Ellis, Daniel Ronaldson, Douglas Erasmus, Ayrton Sweeney, Clayton Jimmie, Brent Szurdoki, Edward Johannisen, Cameron van der Burgh
- Women - Jessica Lee Ashley – Cooper, Kelly Gunnell, Vanessa Mohr, Rita Naude, Charlise Oberholzer, Karin Prinsloo, Marlies Ross, Tatjana Schoenmaker, Megan van Wyk, Rene Warnes, Michelle Weber
- Officials - Nellie Silent, Graham Hill, Igor Omeltchenko, Sibani Makhanya

== Table Tennis ==
- Women - Danisha Patel, Zodwa Maphanga, Khanyisile Madlala, Caitlin Lingeveldt
- Officials - Neville Parker

== Volleyball (beach) ==
- Men - Clinton Stemmet, Leo Williams
- Women - Palesa Masinga, Randy Williams
- Officials - Gershon Rorich

== Para-powelifting ==
- Women - Chantelle Stierman
- Officials - Anita Barnard

== Wrestling ==
- Men - Jan Combrinck, Barco Badenhorst, Tiaan van der Merwe, Andries Schutte, Gert Coetzee, Armando Hietbrink, Martin Erasmus
- Women - Jeannie-Marie Coetzer, Zumicke Geringer, Refilwe Molongwana
- Officials - Gert van der Merwe, Nico Coetzee

== General team management ==
- Chef de Mission – Ezera Tshabangu, Leon Fleiser, Zandi Monyadi, Isaac Mdaka, Jessica Choga, Kagisho Matolong, Reabetswe Mpete
- Team attache - Pela Selomo
- Medical team - Chief Medical Officer – Dr Jerome Mampane, Dr Kgomotso Mogapi, Dr Mapitsi Maphoto, Dr Santa-Marie Venter.

Chief Physiotherapist – Sandhya Silal, Fikile Phasha, Greshne Van Wyk, Sarah Jane Fergusen, Danielle Munezero, Ashleigh Hansen, Venter, Given Baloyi, Avirlash Lukhan, Siyabonga Kunene, Sergant Motha and Hugh Everson, Ugendrie Govender
