= Egypt at the 2015 African Games =

Egypt at the 2015 All-Africa Games
- IOC code: EGY
- NOC: Egyptian Olympic Committee
- Website: http://www.egyptianolympic.org

in Brazzaville
- Competitors: 298 in 17 sports
- Flag bearer: Alaaeldin Abouelkassem
- Medals Ranked 1st: Gold 85 Silver 64 Bronze 68 Total 217

All-Africa Games appearances (overview)
- 1965; 1973; 1978; 1987; 1991; 1995; 1999; 2003; 2007; 2011; 2015; 2019; 2023

Youth appearances
- 2010; 2014

Egypt participated at the 2015 All-Africa Games held in the city of Brazzaville, Republic of the Congo. It participated with 298 athletes in 17 sports.

== Handball ==
Egypt won the handball final for men against Angola
