= List of Egyptian records in swimming =

The Egyptian Records in Swimming represent the fastest times a swimmer representing Egypt ever swam. These records are kept/maintained by the Egyptian Swimming Federation.

Records are recognized for both males and females in the following long course (50m) and short course (25m) events:

- freestyle: 50, 100, 200, 400, 800 and 1500;
- backstroke: 50, 100 and 200;
- breaststroke: 50, 100 and 200;
- butterfly: 50, 100 and 200;
- individual medley (I.M.): 100 (25m only), 200 and 400;
- relays: 4x50 free (25m only), 4x100 free, 4x200 free, 10x25 free (25m only), 10x50 free (50m only), 4x50 medley, and 4x100 medley.

All records were set in finals unless noted otherwise.

== Long course (50m) ==
=== Men ===
Event	Time		Name	Club	Date	Meet	Location	Ref
50 m freestyle	21.80		Abdelrahman Sameh	Egypt	21 June 2026	International Meet Zlatni Medvjed	Zagreb, Croatia	
100 m freestyle	48.77	h	Youssef Ramadan	Egypt	26 July 2023	World Championships	Fukuoka, Japan	
200 m freestyle	1:47.40	h	Marwan Elkamash	Egypt	24 July 2017	World Championships	Budapest, Hungary	
400 m freestyle	3:46.36	h	Marwan Elkamash	Egypt	23 July 2017	World Championships	Budapest, Hungary	
800 m freestyle	7:46.55	h	Marwan Elkamash	Egypt	25 July 2023	World Championships	Fukuoka, Japan	
1500 m freestyle	14:53.66		Ahmed Akram	Egypt	8 August 2015	World Championships	Kazan, Russia	
50m backstroke	24.93	h	Mohamed Samy	Egypt	8 April 2022	Berlin Open	Berlin, Germany	
100m backstroke	54.67	h	Mohamed Samy	Egypt	19 June 2022	World Championships	Budapest, Hungary	
200m backstroke	2:00.84		Mohamed Mohamady	Egypt	22 July 2022	Arab Championships	Oran, Algeria	
50m breaststroke	27.21	h	Youssef El-Kamash	Indiana	26 June 2021	Bahamian Championships	Nassau, Bahamas	
100m breaststroke	1:00.34	tt	Ahmed Ismail	Ohio State University	1 August 2026	U.S. National Championships	Irvine, United States	
200m breaststroke	2:14.83		Youssef El-Kamash	Egypt	23 August 2019	African Games	Casablanca, Morocco	
50m butterfly	22.80	AF	Abdelrahman Sameh	Egypt	18 May 2025	Mare Nostrum	Monte Carlo, Monaco	
100m butterfly	51.67	h	Youssef Ramadan	Egypt	29 July 2021	Olympic Games	Tokyo, Japan	
200m butterfly	1:57.85	h	Abdalla Nasr	Egypt	13 February 2024	World Championships	Doha, Qatar	
200m individual medley	2:00.22	sf	Mohamed Hussein	Egypt	5 August 2015	World Championships	Kazan, Russia	
400m individual medley	4:23.02	h	Ahmed Hamdy	Egypt	9 August 2015	World Championships	Kazan, Russia	
4×50m freestyle relay	1:36.25		Ahmed Salah Abdo; Joseph George; Ahmed Al Kafrawi; Mustafa Atef	Al Ahly SC	2007	Egyptian Cup	Cairo, Egypt	
4×100m freestyle relay	3:18.23	h	Ali Khalafalla (49.80); Mohamed Samy (48.89); Youssef Abdalla (50.27); Mohamed Hussein (49.27)	Egypt	23 July 2017	World Championships	Budapest, Hungary	
4×200m freestyle relay	7:16.95	h	Marwan Elkamash (1:48.80); Mohamed Samy (1:48.27); Ahmed Akram (1:48.89); Marwan El-Amrawy (1:50.99)	Egypt	28 July 2017	World Championships	Budapest, Hungary	
10×50m freestyle relay	4:08.76		Hassan Yasser Ezzat; Mohamed Emad Khalifa; Youssef Omar Shoeb; Mohamed Samy; Ahmed Kamal Hafez; Marawan Tarek Mohamed; Mohamed Ahmed Bahaa; Mostafa Akram Abdelmonem; Ahmed Wael Gallal; Aly Ahmed Sultan	Al Maadi	2014	Egyptian Championships	Cairo, Egypt	
4×50m medley relay	1:45.80			-	2014	Egyptian Championships	Cairo, Egypt	
4×100m medley relay	3:39.03	h	Mohamed Samy (55.23); Youssef El-Kamash (1:00.97); Abdelrahman Sameh (53.99); Ali Khalafalla (48.84)	Egypt	28 July 2019	World Championships	Gwangju, South Korea	

Legend: # – Record awaiting ratification by Egyptian Swimming Federation; WR – World record; AF – African record; e – equalled existing record;
Records not set in finals: h – heat; sf – semifinal; r – relay 1st leg; rh – relay heat 1st leg; b – B final; † – en route to final mark; so – swim-off; tt – time trial

=== Women ===
Event	Time		Name	Club	Date	Meet	Location	Ref
50m freestyle	24.62	sf, AF	Farida Osman	Egypt	29 July 2017	World Championships	Budapest, Hungary	
100m freestyle	54.93	h	Farida Osman	Egypt	25 July 2019	World Championships	Gwangju, South Korea	
200m freestyle	2:01.93	h	Rania Elwani	Egypt	18 September 2000	Olympic Games	Sydney, Australia	
400m freestyle	4:18.14		Lojine Abdallah	All Stars Swimming Academy	7 February 2026	Dubai Open Championships	Dubai, United Arab Emirates	
800m freestyle	8:47.67		Hania Moro	Retriever Aquatic Club	4 December 2019	U.S. Open	Atlanta, United States	
1500m freestyle	16:48.80		Hania Moro	Retriever Aquatic Club	7 December 2019	U.S. Open	Atlanta, United States	
50m backstroke	29.17	h	Samiha Mohsen	Egypt	11 October 2021	African Championships	Accra, Ghana	
100m backstroke	1:03.03	h	Dina Hegazy	Al Shams	27 July 2009	World Championships	Rome, Italy	
200m backstroke	2:14.28		Dina Hegazy	Trojan S.C.	19 June 2009	Swim Meet of Champions	Mission Viejo, United States	
50m breaststroke	32.14	h	Mai Atef Abdelfattah	Egypt	8 August 2015	World Championships	Kazan, Russia	
100m breaststroke	1:10.59		Mai Atef Abdelfattah	Egypt	September 2014	Arab Championships	Casablanca, Morocco	
200m breaststroke	2:33.13		Salma Abdelraouf Zinhom	Al Zohour	2002	Egyptian Championships	Cairo, Egypt	
50m butterfly	25.38	AF	Farida Osman	Egypt	24 June 2022	World Championships	Budapest, Hungary	
100m butterfly	57.66	AF	Farida Osman	Egypt	19 June 2022	World Championships	Budapest, Hungary	
200m butterfly	2:13.60	h	Nour Elgendy	Unattached	21 December 2024	Gyor Open	Gyor, Hungary	
200m individual medley	2:19.74		Nour Elgendy	Egypt	13 March 2024	African Games	Accra, Ghana	
400m individual medley	4:56.88		Rowida Hesham	Egypt	6 April 2016	6th Dubai International Championships	Dubai, United Arab Emirates	
4×50m freestyle relay	1:51.69		Heba Yehya; Salma Zenhom; Asmaa Katareya; May Atef Hassan	Al Ahly SC	2007	Egyptian Cup	Cairo, Egypt	
4×100m freestyle relay	3:48.47		Farida Osman (55.86); Nour El-Gendy (57.53); Lojine Hamed (57.54); Nadine Abdallah (57.54)	Egypt	12 March 2024	African Games	Accra, Ghana	
4×200m freestyle relay	8:30.84		Roaia Mashaly (2:05.51); Salma Saber (2:06.64); Mariam Sakr (2:07.20); Rowan El Badry (2:11.19)	Egypt	6 September 2015	African Games	Brazzaville, Congo	
10×50m free relay	4:56.31		Salma Gamal; Nadeen Salah; Nouran Folifel; Sameha Tarek; Habeba Essam; Shreifa Khashaba; Meira Mohamed; Malak Dahroug; Nada Khaled; Saba Ayman	Al Maadi	2012	Cairo Swimming Championship	Cairo, Egypt	
4×50m medley relay	2:05.72			-	2014	Egyptian Championships	Cairo, Egypt	
4×100m medley relay	4:15.18		Mariam Sakr (1:07.44); Maii Atif (1:11.10); Farida Osman (59.72); Rowan Elbadry (56.92)	Egypt	11 September 2015	African Games	Brazzaville, Congo	

Legend: # – Record awaiting ratification by Egyptian Swimming Federation; WR – World record; AF – African record; e – equalled existing record;
Records not set in finals: h – heat; sf – semifinal; r – relay 1st leg; rh – relay heat 1st leg; b – B final; † – en route to final mark; so – swim-off; tt – time trial

=== Mixed relay ===
Event	Time	Name	Club	Date	Meet	Location	Ref
4×100 m freestyle relay	3:34.31	Mohamed Samy (49.86); Ali Khalafalla (49.75); Amina Elsebelgy (58.27); Farida Osman (56.43)	Egypt	23 August 2019	African Games	Casablanca, Morocco	
4×100 m medley relay	3:53.93	Mohamed Samy (55.28); Youssef El-Kamash (1:00.83); Farida Osman (59.09); Amina Elsebelgy (58.73)	Egypt	22 August 2019	African Games	Casablanca, Morocco	

Legend: # – Record awaiting ratification by Egyptian Swimming Federation; WR – World record; AF – African record; e – equalled existing record;
Records not set in finals: h – heat; so – swim-off

== Short course (25m) ==
=== Men ===
Event	Time		Name	Club	Date	Meet	Location	Ref
50m freestyle	21.02	r	Youssef Ramadan	C.N. Sabadell	14 November 2026	Spanish Championships	Madrid, Spain	
100m freestyle	46.14	b	Youssef Ramadan	C.N. Sabadell	13 November 2026	Spanish Championships	Madrid, Spain	
200m freestyle	1:45.04	h	Abdalla Nasr	Egypt	15 December 2024	World Championships	Budapest, Hungary	
400m freestyle	3:40.94		Marwan El-Kamash	Egypt	21 October 2022	World Cup	Berlin, Germany	
800m freestyle	7:36.01		Marwan El-Kamash	Egypt	17 December 2022	World Championships	Melbourne, Australia	
1500m freestyle	14:35.93		Marwan El-Kamash	Egypt	22 October 2022	World Cup	Berlin, Germany	
50m backstroke	23.22		Youssef Ramadan	Egypt	26 October 2025	French Championships	Taverny, France	
100m backstroke	51.97		Mohamed Samy	DC Trident	12 November 2021	International Swimming League	Eindhoven, Netherlands	
200m backstroke	1:57.15		Mohamed Samy	DC Trident	5 November 2020	International Swimming League	Budapest, Hungary	
50m breaststroke	26.90	h	Youssef El-Kamash	Egypt	20 December 2021	World Championships	Abu Dhabi, United Arab Emirates	
100m breaststroke	59.18	h	Youssef El-Kamash	Egypt	16 December 2021	World Championships	Abu Dhabi, United Arab Emirates	
200m breaststroke	2:11.15	h	Youssef El-Kamash	Egypt	18 December 2021	World Championships	Abu Dhabi, United Arab Emirates	
50m butterfly	22.07		Youssef Ramadan	C.N. Sabadell	15 November 2026	Spainsh Championships	Madrid, Spain	
100m butterfly	49.14		Youssef Ramadan	C.N. Sabadell	14 November 2026	Spanish Championships	Madrid, Spain	
200m butterfly	1:53.42	h	Abdalla Nasr	Egypt	12 December 2024	World Championships	Budapest, Hungary	
100m individual medley	53.04		Mohamed Samy	DC Trident	6 November 2020	International Swimming League	Budapest, Hungary	
200m individual medley	1:55.74	h	Mohamed Samy	Egypt	16 December 2021	World Championships	Abu Dhabi, United Arab Emirates	
400m individual medley	4:15.92		Mohamed Samy	DC Trident	6 November 2020	International Swimming League	Budapest, Hungary	
4x50m freestyle relay	1:37.47			-	2008			
4x100m freestyle relay	3:18.49	h	Mohamed Samy (49.98); Marwan Elkamash (51.11); Abdelrahman Sameh (48.37); Youssef Ramadan (49.03)	Egypt	16 December 2021	World Championships	Abu Dhabi, United Arab Emirates	
4x200m freestyle relay	7:31.38	h	Hussein Medhat (1:50.67); Mohamed Maher (1:53.19); Mohamed Gadallah (1:54.69); Abdel El-Badrawy (1:52.83)	Egypt	10 April 2008	World Championships	Manchester, United Kingdom	
10x25m freestyle relay	1:57.31			-	2005			
4x50m medley relay	1:32.56	AF	Mohamed Samy (23.68); Youssef Elkamash (26.32); Youssef Ramadan (22.12); Abdelrahman Sameh (20.44)	Egypt	20 December 2021	World Championships	Abu Dhabi, United Arab Emirates	
4x100m medley relay	3:30.83	h, AF	Mohamed Samy (52.55); Youssef Elkamash (59.71); Youssef Ramadan (50.89); Abdelrahman Sameh (47.68)	Egypt	21 December 2021	World Championships	Abu Dhabi, United Arab Emirates	

Legend: # – Record awaiting ratification by Egyptian Swimming Federation; WR – World record; AF – African record; e – equalled existing record;
Records not set in finals: h – heat; sf – semifinal; r – relay 1st leg; rh – relay heat 1st leg; b – B final; † – en route to final mark; so – swim-off; tt – time trial

=== Women ===
Event	Time		Name	Club	Date	Meet	Location	Ref
50 m freestyle	24.37	AF	Farida Osman	LA Current	20 December 2019	International Swimming League	Las Vegas, United States	
100 m freestyle	54.42	h	Farida Osman	Egypt	17 December 2021	World Championships	Abu Dhabi, United Arab Emirates	
200 m freestyle	1:59.23		Rania Elwani	Egypt	19 March 1994	World Cup	Gelsenkirchen, Germany	
400 m freestyle	4:24.32	†	Reem Kassem	Egypt	17 October 2013	World Cup	Dubai, United Arab Emirates	
800 m freestyle	8:54.21		Reem Kassem	Egypt	17 October 2013	World Cup	Dubai, United Arab Emirates	
1500 m freestyle								
50m backstroke	28.12		Samiha Mohsen	Toronto Swim Club	24 March 2022	Canadian University Championships	Quebec City, Canada	
100m backstroke	1:01.01		Samiha Mohsen	University Of Calgary Varsity	24 November 2019	Canada West Championships	Lethbridge, Canada	
200m backstroke	2:15.85	h	Samiha Mohsen	Egypt	30 October 2022	World Cup	Toronto, Canada	
50m breaststroke	32.75		Salma Zienhom	Egypt	18 January 2003	World Cup	Paris, France	
100m breaststroke	1:09.45		Salma Zienhom	Egypt	17 January 2003	World Cup	Paris, France	
200m breaststroke	2:28.97		Salma Zienhom	Egypt	18 January 2003	World Cup	Paris, France	
50m butterfly	25.31	AF	Farida Osman	LA Current	17 November 2019	International Swimming League	College Park, United States	
100m butterfly	56.46	AF	Farida Osman	LA Current	20 December 2019	International Swimming League	Las Vegas, United States	
200m butterfly	2:23.07		-	-	2011			
100m individual medley	1:05.37	h	Mai Mostafa	Egypt	18 October 2013	World Cup	Dubai, United Arab Emirates	
200m individual medley	2:21.19		-	-	2011			
400m individual medley								
4x50m freestyle relay	1:55.92			-	2001	-	Cairo, Egypt	
4x100m freestyle relay	4:10.64			-	1999			
4x200m freestyle relay								
10x25m freestyle relay	2:19.00			-	2003			
4x50m medley relay	2:08.16			-	2008			
4x100m medley relay								

Legend: # – Record awaiting ratification by Egyptian Swimming Federation; e – equalled existing record;
Records not set in finals: h – heat; sf – semifinal; r – relay 1st leg; rh – relay heat 1st leg; b – B final; † – en route to final mark; so – swim-off; tt – time trial

=== Mixed relay ===
Event	Time	Name	Club	Date	Meet	Location	Ref
4×50 m freestyle relay	1:39.13		Egypt	18 October 2013	World Cup	Dubai, United Arab Emirates	
4×50 m medley relay	1:49.13	Mariam Sakr (29.92); Mai Mostafa (32.23); Ahmed Mousa (24.62); Shehab Younis (22.36)	Egypt	17 October 2013	World Cup	Dubai, United Arab Emirates	

Legend: # – Record awaiting ratification by Egyptian Swimming Federation; e – equalled existing record;
Records not set in finals: h – heat; so – swim-off
