= List of Senegalese records in swimming =

The Senegalese records in swimming are the fastest ever performances of swimmers from Senegal, which are recognised and ratified by the Fédération Sénégalaise de Natation et de Sauvetage (FSNS).

All records were set in finals unless noted otherwise.

== Long Course (50 m) ==
=== Men ===
Event	Time		Name	Club	Date	Meet	Location	Ref
50 m freestyle	23.08		Steven Aimable	Senegal	24 August 2022	African Championships	Tunis, Tunisia	
100 m freestyle	50.61	h	Matthieu Seye	Villejuif Natation	28 June 2026	French Championships	Saint-Étienne, France	
200 m freestyle	1:55.13		Matthieu Seye	Senegal	10 March 2024	African Games	Accra, Ghana	
400 m freestyle	4:13.64	h	Matthieu Seye	Senegal	11 March 2024	African Games	Accra, Ghana	
800 m freestyle	8:44.81		Amadou Ndiaye	Senegal	5 May 2026	African Championships	Oran, Algeria	
1500 m freestyle	17:06.71		Amadou Ndiaye	Senegal	14 September 2018	African Championships	Algiers, Algeria	
50 m backstroke	26.31		Steven Aimable	Senegal	11 March 2024	African Games	Accra, Ghana	
100 m backstroke	57.99		Matthieu Seye	CN Antibes	2 June 2024	National Spring Meeting - Southern Region	Aix-en-Provence, France	
200 m backstroke	2:08.44	h	Matthieu Seye	Senegal	27 July 2023	World Championships	Fukuoka, Japan	
50 m breaststroke	28.09							
100 m breaststroke	1:01.80							
200 m breaststroke	2:15.00							
50 m butterfly	24.35	c	Matthieu Seye	Villejuif Natation	14 June 2025	French Championships	Montpellier, France	
100 m butterfly	53.64	h	Steven Aimable	Senegal	29 July 2021	Olympic Games	Tokyo, Japan	
200 m butterfly	2:18.66							
200 m individual medley	2:06.94							
400 m individual medley	4:41.57							
4×100 m freestyle relay	3:27.92		Steven Aimable (51.61); El Hadji Adama Niane (51.98); Matthieu Seye (51.90); Karl Wilson Aimable (52.43)	Senegal	23 August 2022	African Championships	Tunis, Tunisia	
4×200 m freestyle relay	7:58.65		Amaduo N'Diaye; Matthieu Seye; Karl Wilson Aimable; Ousseynou Diop	Senegal	October 2021	African Championships	Accra, Ghana	
4×100 m medley relay	3:54.56		Matthieu Seye (58.91); Adama Thiaw Ndir (1:07.55); Steven Aimable (55.73); El Hadji Adama Niane (52.37)	Senegal	24 August 2022	African Championships	Tunis, Tunisia	

Legend: # – Record awaiting ratification by Fédération Sénégalaise de Natation et de Sauvetage; WR – World record; AF – African record; e – equalled existing record;
Records not set in finals: h – heat; sf – semifinal; r – relay 1st leg; rh – relay heat 1st leg; b – B final; † – en route to final mark; so – swim-off; tt – time trial

=== Women ===
Event	Time		Name	Club	Date	Meet	Location	Ref
50 m freestyle	27.06	h	Oumy Diop	Senegal	13 March 2024	African Games	Accra, Ghana	
100 m freestyle	57.48		Oumy Diop	Senegal	11 November 2025	Islamic Solidarity Games	Riyadh, Saudi Arabia	
200 m freestyle	2:05.51		Khadija Ciss	MANUC				
400 m freestyle	4:24.45		Khadija Ciss	MANUC				
800 m freestyle	9:02.54		Khadija Ciss	MANUC				
1500 m freestyle	18:35.02		Khadija Ciss	MANUC				
50 m backstroke	29.35		Oumy Diop	Senegal	7 May 2026	African Championships	Oran, Algeria	
100 m backstroke	1:05.48		Khadija Ciss	MANUC				
200 m backstroke	2:22.09		Khadija Ciss	MANUC				
50 m breaststroke	34.82							
100 m breaststroke	1:16.67							
200 m breaststroke	2:42.34							
50 m butterfly	27.03		Oumy Diop	Senegal	6 May 2026	African Championships	Oran, Algeria	
100 m butterfly	1:01.24		Oumy Diop	Senegal	22 August 2022	African Championships	Tunis, Tunisia	
200 m butterfly	2:31.24							
200 m individual medley	2:27.41		Khadija Ciss	MANUC				
400 m individual medley	5:15.93		Khadija Ciss	MANUC				
4×100 m freestyle relay	4:11.35		Jeanne Boutbien; Mariama Drame; Oumy Diop; Ndèye Dièye	Senegal	October 2021	African Championships	Accra, Ghana	
4×200 m freestyle relay	9:32.19		Jeanne Boutbien; Oumy Diop; Mariama Drame; Ndèye Dièye	Senegal	October 2021	African Championships	Accra, Ghana	
4×100 m medley relay	4:46.20		Khadidiatou Dieng (1:15.57); Ouleye Diallo (1:23.00); Binta Zahra Diop (1:02.31); Mareme Faye (1:05.32)	Senegal	1 August 2009	World Championships	Rome, Italy	

Legend: # – Record awaiting ratification by Fédération Sénégalaise de Natation et de Sauvetage; WR – World record; AF – African record; e – equalled existing record;
Records not set in finals: h – heat; sf – semifinal; r – relay 1st leg; rh – relay heat 1st leg; b – B final; † – en route to final mark; so – swim-off; tt – time trial

=== Mixed relay ===
Event	Time	Name	Club	Date	Meet	Location	Ref
4×100 m freestyle relay	3:43.89	Abdoul Niane (52.08); El Hadji Adama Niane (51.67); Sophia Diagne (1:01.49); Jeanne Boutbien (58.65)	Senegal	23 August 2019	African Games	Casablanca, Morocco	
4×100 m medley relay	4:10.17	Sophia Diagne (1:10.51); Adama Thiaw Ndir (1:05.54); Steven Aimable (55.31); Jeanne Boutbien (58.81)	Senegal	22 August 2019	African Games	Casablanca, Morocco	

Legend: # – Record awaiting ratification by Fédération Sénégalaise de Natation et de Sauvetage; WR – World record; AF – African record; e – equalled existing record;
Records not set in finals: h – heat; so – swim-off

== Short Course (25 m) ==
=== Men ===
Event	Time		Name	Club	Date	Meet	Location	Ref
50 m freestyle	22.42	h	Steven Aimable	Senegal	16 December 2022	World Championships	Melbourne, Australia	
100 m freestyle	48.89	h	Matthieu Seye	Villejuif Natation	1 November 2026	French Championships	Angers, France	
200 m freestyle	1:51.71	h	Matthieu Seye	Villejuif Natation	5 November 2024	French Championships	Chartres, France	
400 m freestyle								
800 m freestyle								
1500 m freestyle								
50 m backstroke	25.03	h	Steven Aimable	Senegal	11 October 2025	World Cup	Carmel, United States	
100 m backstroke	54.14	h	Matthieu Seye	Villejuif Natation	3 November 2024	French Championships	Montpellier, France	
200 m backstroke	1:59.14	c	Matthieu Seye	Villejuif Natation	3 November 2022	French Championships	Chartres, France	
50 m breaststroke	28.02							
100 m breaststroke	1:00.95							
200 m breaststroke	2:12.15	h	Malick Fall	Senegal	14 December 2012	World Championships	Istanbul, Turkey	
50 m butterfly	23.58	c	Matthieu Seye	Villejuif Natation	31 October 2026	French Championships	Angers, France	
100 m butterfly	52.62	h	Matthieu Seye	Villejuif Natation	29 October 2026	French Championships	Angers, France	
200 m butterfly	2:01.15	h	Steven Aimable	Senegal	12 December 2024	World Championships	Budapest, Hungary	
100 m individual medley								
200 m individual medley	2:04.31		Matthieu Seye	Villejuif Natation	19 October 2024	Meeting New Wave - Back to swim	Villejuif, France	
400 m individual medley								
4×50m freestyle relay								
4×100m freestyle relay								
4×200m freestyle relay								
4×50m medley relay								
4×100m medley relay								

Legend: # – Record awaiting ratification by Fédération Sénégalaise de Natation et de Sauvetage; WR – World record; AF – African record; e – equalled existing record;
Records not set in finals: h – heat; sf – semifinal; r – relay 1st leg; rh – relay heat 1st leg; b – B final; † – en route to final mark; so – swim-off; tt – time trial

=== Women ===
Event	Time		Name	Club	Date	Meet	Location	Ref
50m freestyle	26.45	h	Oumy Diop	Senegal	14 December 2024	World Championships	Budapest, Hungary	
100m freestyle	57.75	h	Jeanne Boutbien	Senegal	12 December 2018	World Championships	Hangzhou, China	
200m freestyle	2:03.24		Khadija Ciss	MANUC				
400m freestyle	4:19.96		Khadija Ciss	MANUC				
800m freestyle	8:52.32		Khadija Ciss	MANUC				
1500m freestyle								
50m backstroke	31.65		Khadija Ciss	MANUC				
100m backstroke	1:03.91		Khadija Ciss	MANUC				
200m backstroke	2:16.66		Khadija Ciss	MANUC				
50m breaststroke	35.49							
100m breaststroke	1:14.75							
200m breaststroke	2:34.28							
50m butterfly	27.66	h	Oumy Diop	Senegal	18 December 2021	World Championships	Abu Dhabi, United Arab Emirates	
100m butterfly	1:00.77	h	Oumy Diop	Senegal	13 December 2024	World Championships	Budapest, Hungary	
200m butterfly			Khadija Ciss	MANUC				
100m individual medley	1:10.85		Khadija Ciss	MANUC				
200m individual medley	2:21.61							
400m individual medley	5:14.92							
4×50m freestyle relay								
4×100m freestyle relay								
4×200m freestyle relay								
4×50m medley relay								
4×100m medley relay								

Legend: # – Record awaiting ratification by Fédération Sénégalaise de Natation et de Sauvetage; WR – World record; AF – African record; e – equalled existing record;
Records not set in finals: h – heat; sf – semifinal; r – relay 1st leg; rh – relay heat 1st leg; b – B final; † – en route to final mark; so – swim-off; tt – time trial

=== Mixed relay ===
Event	Time		Name	Club	Date	Meet	Location	Ref
4×50 m freestyle relay								
4×50 m medley relay	1:56.95	h	Ada Thioune (33.16); Amadou Ndiaye (31.42); Abdoul Niane (26.05); Jeanne Boutbien (26.32)	Senegal	13 December 2018	World Championships	Hangzhou, China	

Legend: # – Record awaiting ratification by Fédération Sénégalaise de Natation et de Sauvetage; WR – World record; AF – African record; e – equalled existing record;
Records not set in finals: h – heat; so – swim-off
