= List of African Championships records in swimming =

The African Championships records in swimming performances in each event at the biennial African Swimming Championships. The championships are organised by the African Swimming Confederation (CANA), and were last held in September 2018 in Algiers, Algeria. All events are held in long course (50 m) swimming pools.

== Men's events ==
Event	Time		Name	Nationality	Date	Meet	Location	Ref
50 m freestyle	22.27		Abdelrahman Sameh	Egypt	9 May 2026	2026 Championships	Oran, Algeria	
100 m freestyle	48.91		Youssef Ramadan	Egypt	5 May 2026	2026 Championships	Oran, Algeria	
200 m freestyle	1:49.35		Mohannad Yasser	Egypt	6 May 2026	2026 Championships	Oran, Algeria	
400 m freestyle	3:51.12		Marwan Elkamash	Egypt	13 September 2018	2018 Championships	Algiers, Algeria	
800 m freestyle	8:02.37		Marwan Elkamash	Egypt	11 September 2018	2018 Championships	Algiers, Algeria	
1500 m freestyle	15:26.40		Marwan Elkamash	Egypt	14 September 2018	2018 Championships	Algiers, Algeria	
50m backstroke	25.34		Mohamed Samy	Egypt	13 October 2021	2021 Championships	Accra, Ghana	
100m backstroke	55.31		Abdellah Ardjoune	Algeria	23 August 2022	2022 Championships	Tunis, Tunisia	
200m backstroke	2:00.54		Martin Binedell	South Africa	13 October 2021	2021 Championships	Accra, Ghana	
50m breaststroke	27.95	h	Youssef El-Kamash	Egypt	11 September 2018	2018 Championships	Algiers, Algeria	
100m breaststroke	1:01.18		Jaouad Syoud	Algeria	21 August 2022	2022 Championships	Tunis, Tunisia	
200m breaststroke	2:13.37		Jaouad Syoud	Algeria	22 August 2022	2022 Championships	Tunis, Tunisia	
50m butterfly	23.50		Jason Dunford	Kenya	3 Dec 2008	2008 Championships	Johannesburg, South Africa	
100m butterfly	52.36		Youssef Ramadan	Egypt	7 May 2026	2026 Championships	Oran, Algeria	
200m butterfly	1:58.98		Jaouad Syoud	Algeria	20 August 2022	2022 Championships	Tunis, Tunisia	
200m individual medley	2:00.05		Jaouad Syoud	Algeria	24 August 2022	2022 Championships	Tunis, Tunisia	
400m individual medley	4:21.06		Jay Cee Thomson	South Africa	14 September 2010	2010 Championships	Casablanca, Morocco	
4×100m freestyle relay	3:20.04		Yassin Hossam (50.25); Marwan Elkamash; Ali Khalafalla; Mohamed Samy	Egypt	October 2021	2021 Championships	Accra, Ghana	
4×200m freestyle relay	7:28.10		Marwan El-Amrawy (1:51.24); Marwan Elkamash (1:49.81); Ahmed Hamdy (1:53.20); Mohamed Samy (1:53.85)	Egypt	12 September 2018	2018 Championships	Algiers, Algeria	
4×100m medley relay	3:41.70		Youssef Abdalla Said (56.45); Youssef Elkamash (1:02.14); Ali Khalafalla (53.84); Mohamed Samy (49.27)	Egypt	16 October 2021	2021 Championships	Accra, Ghana	

Legend: # – Record awaiting ratification by CANA;
Records not set in finals: h – heat; sf – semifinal; r – relay 1st leg; rh – relay heat 1st leg; † – en route to final mark; so – swim-off

== Women's events ==
Event	Time	Name	Nationality	Date	Meet	Location	Ref
50m freestyle	25.11	Farida Osman	Egypt	14 September 2018	2018 Championships	Algiers, Algeria	
100m freestyle	54.79	Erin Gallagher	South Africa	10 September 2018	2018 Championships	Algiers, Algeria	
200m freestyle	2:01.92	Leone Vorster	South Africa	12 Sep 2006	2006 Championships	Dakar, Senegal	
400m freestyle	4:14.23	Melissa Corfe	South Africa	7 May 2004	2004 Championships	Casablanca, Morocco	
800m freestyle	8:50.45	Michelle Weber	South Africa	14 September 2012	2012 Championships	Nairobi, Kenya	
1500m freestyle	16:46.46	Michelle Weber	South Africa	16 September 2012	2012 Championships	Nairobi, Kenya	
50m backstroke	29.04	Erin Gallagher	South Africa	10 September 2018	2018 Championships	Algiers, Algeria	
100m backstroke	1:02.32	Chanelle Van Wyk	South Africa	16 September 2010	2010 Championships	Casablanca, Morocco	
200m backstroke	2:14.33	Mariella Venter	South Africa	22 October 2016	2016 Championships	Bloemfontein, South Africa	
50m breaststroke	31.99	Lara van Niekerk	South Africa	12 September 2018	2018 Championships	Algiers, Algeria	
100m breaststroke	1:10.81	Emily Visagie	South Africa	15 October 2021	2021 Championships	Accra, Ghana	
200m breaststroke	2:32.16	Sarra Lajnef	Tunisia	14 September 2010	2010 Championships	Casablanca, Morocco	
50m butterfly	26.16	Farida Osman	Egypt	11 September 2018	2018 Championships	Algiers, Algeria	
100m butterfly	59.03	Farida Osman	Egypt	13 September 2018	2018 Championships	Algiers, Algeria	
200m butterfly	2:11.97	Mandy Loots	South Africa	19 September 2010	2010 Championships	Casablanca, Morocco	
200m individual medley	2:15.45	Rebecca Meder	South Africa	15 October 2021	2021 Championships	Accra, Ghana	
400m individual medley	4:45.76	Kathryn Meaklim	South Africa	14 September 2010	2010 Championships	Casablanca, Morocco	
4×100m freestyle relay	3:49.91	Inge Weidemann (57.52); Caitlin De Lange (58.94); Hannah Robertson (56.98); Rebecca Meder (56.47)	South Africa	13 October 2021	2021 Championships	Accra, Ghana	
4×200m freestyle relay	8:26.35	Hannah Robertson; Leigh McMorran; Christin Mundell; Rebecca Meder	South Africa	11 October 2021	2021 Championships	Accra, Ghana	
4×100m medley relay	4:09.53	Chanelle Van Wyk (1:02.94); Kathryn Meaklim (1:11.51); Vanessa Mohr (59.51); Karin Prinsloo (55.57)	South Africa	18 September 2010	2010 Championships	Casablanca, Morocco	

Legend: # – Record awaiting ratification by CANA;
Records not set in finals: h – heat; sf – semifinal; r – relay 1st leg; rh – relay heat 1st leg; † – en route to final mark; so – swim-off

== Mixed relay ==
Event	Time	Name	Club	Date	Meet	Location	Ref
4×100m freestyle relay	3:34.02	Andrew Ross (51.04); Inge Weidemann (57.29); Rebecca Meder (56.25); Guy Brooks (49.44)	South Africa	12 October 2021	2021 Championships	Accra, Ghana	
4×100m medley relay	3:55.88	Samiha Mohsen (1:04.65); Youssef El-Kamash (1:01.45); Farida Osman (1:00.31); Mohamed Samy (49.47)	Egypt	14 September 2018	2018 Championships	Algiers, Algeria	

Legend: # – Record awaiting ratification by CANA; WR – World record; AF – African record;
Records not set in finals: h – heat; so – swim-off
