= 2018 African Swimming Championships – Men's 200 metre freestyle =

Men's 200 metre freestyle at the 2018 African Swimming Championships
- Venue: Mohamed Boudiaf Olympic Complex
- Dates: 10 September (heats and final)
- Competitors: 17 from 12 nations
- Winning time: 1:49.62

Medalists
gold medal	Mohamed Samy	Egypt
silver medal	Marwan Elkamash	Egypt
bronze medal	Mohamed Aziz Ghaffari	Tunisia

The Men's 200 metre freestyle competition of the 2018 African Swimming Championships was held on 10 September 2018.

== Records ==
Prior to the competition, the existing world and championship records were as follows.

	Name	Nation	Time	Location	Date
World record	Paul Biedermann	Germany	1:42.00	Rome	28 July 2009
African record	Chad le Clos	South Africa	1:45.20	Rio de Janeiro	8 August 2016
Championship record	Ahmed Mathlouthi	Tunisia	1:49.90	Casablanca	13 September 2010

The following new records were set during this competition.

Date	Event	Name	Nationality	Time	Record
10 September	Final	Mohamed Samy	Egypt	1:49.90	CR

== Results ==
=== Heats ===
The heats were started on 10 September at 10:10.

Rank	Name	Nationality	Time	Notes
1	Marwan Elkamash	Egypt	1:52.17	Q
2	Mohamed Aziz Ghaffari	Tunisia	1:52.48	Q
3	Mohamed Samy	Egypt	1:53.40	Q
4	Lounis Khendriche	Algeria	1:54.04	Q
4	Mohamed Agili	Tunisia	1:54.04	Q
6	Mathieu Marquet	Mauritius	1:54.43	Q
7	Ayrton Sweeney	South Africa	1:54.50	Q
8	Mohamed Djaballah	Algeria	1:54.75	Q
9	Dean Hoffman	Seychelles	2:02.36	
10	Ma'az Khota	South Africa	2:02.84	
11	Atuhaire Ambala	Uganda	2:03.65	
12	Alvin Omondi	Kenya	2:07.18	
13	Chase Onorati	Zimbabwe	2:08.11	
14	Ovesh Purahoo	Mauritius	2:09.49	
15	Belly-Cresus Ganira	Burundi	2:12.93	
16	Billy-Scott Irakose	Burundi	2:15.81	
17	Zinhle Bekker	Botswana	2:18.44	

=== Final ===
The final was started on 10 September.

Rank	Lane	Name	Nationality	Time	Notes
1st place, gold medalist(s)	3	Mohamed Samy	Egypt	1:49.62	CR
2nd place, silver medalist(s)	4	Marwan Elkamash	Egypt	1:49.88	
3rd place, bronze medalist(s)	5	Mohamed Aziz Ghaffari	Tunisia	1:50.07	
4	6	Mohamed Agili	Tunisia	1:50.28	
5	1	Ayrton Sweeney	South Africa	1:53.15	
6	8	Mohamed Djaballah	Algeria	1:54.02	
7	2	Lounis Khendriche	Algeria	1:54.20	
8	7	Mathieu Marquet	Mauritius	1:55.33	
