= 2018 African Swimming Championships – Men's 200 metre breaststroke =

Men's 200 metre breaststroke at the 2018 African Swimming Championships
- Venue: Mohamed Boudiaf Olympic Complex
- Dates: 13 September (heats and final)
- Competitors: 12 from 9 nations
- Winning time: 2:14.04

Medalists
gold medal	Ayrton Sweeney	South Africa
silver medal	Wassim Elloumi	Tunisia
bronze medal	Alaric Basson	South Africa

The Men's 200 metre breaststroke competition of the 2018 African Swimming Championships was held on 13 September 2018.

== Records ==
Prior to the competition, the existing world and championship records were as follows.

	Name	Nation	Time	Location	Date
World record	Ippei Watanabe	Japan	2:06.67	Tokyo	29 January 2017
African record	Neil Versfeld	South Africa	2:09.61	Rome	30 July 2009
Championship record	William Diering	South Africa	2:15.65	Casablanca	16 September 2010

The following new records were set during this competition.

Date	Event	Name	Nationality	Time	Record
13 September	Final	Ayrton Sweeney	South Africa	2:14.04	CR

== Results ==
=== Heats ===
The heats were started on 13 September at 10:05.

Rank	Name	Nationality	Time	Notes
1	Ayrton Sweeney	South Africa	2:19.92	Q
2	Youssef El-Kamash	Egypt	2:20.65	Q
3	Beji Adnane	Tunisia	2:21.33	Q
4	Wassim Elloumi	Tunisia	2:22.49	Q
5	Jonathan Chung Yee	Mauritius	2:22.63	Q
6	Alaric Basson	South Africa	2:23.93	Q
7	Moncef Aymen Balamane	Algeria	2:24.07	Q
8	Siar Abderrazak	Algeria	2:26.14	Q
9	Ahllan Bique	Mozambique	2:35.81	
10	Mario Ervedosa	Angola	2:44.75	
11	Ayaan Chand	Botswana	2:50.00	
	Sadiq Yahaya	Nigeria	Did not start	

=== Final ===
The final was started on 13 September.

Rank	Lane	Name	Nationality	Time	Notes
1st place, gold medalist(s)	4	Ayrton Sweeney	South Africa	2:14.04	CR
2nd place, silver medalist(s)	6	Wassim Elloumi	Tunisia	2:15.76	
3rd place, bronze medalist(s)	7	Alaric Basson	South Africa	2:16.16	
4	3	Beji Adnane	Tunisia	2:19.07	
5	5	Youssef El-Kamash	Egypt	2:19.25	
6	1	Moncef Aymen Balamane	Algeria	2:20.76	
7	2	Jonathan Chung Yee	Mauritius	2:23.55	
8	8	Siar Abderrazak	Algeria	2:26.74	
