= 2018 African Swimming Championships – Men's 200 metre individual medley =

Men's 200 metre individual medley at the 2018 African Swimming Championships
- Venue: Mohamed Boudiaf Olympic Complex
- Dates: 15 September (heats and final)
- Competitors: 12 from 8 nations
- Winning time: 2:01.21

Medalists
gold medal	Mohamed Samy	Egypt
silver medal	Ayrton Sweeney	South Africa
bronze medal	Moncef Aymen Balamane	Algeria

The Men's 200 metre individual medley competition of the 2018 African Swimming Championships was held on 15 September 2018.

== Records ==
Prior to the competition, the existing world and championship records were as follows.

	Name	Nation	Time	Location	Date
World record	Ryan Lochte	United States	1:54.00	Shanghai	28 July 2011
African record	Darian Townsend	South Africa	1:57.03	Montpellier	25 April 2009
Championship record	Jay-Cee Thomson	South Africa	2:02.95	Casablanca	18 September 2010

The following new records were set during this competition.

Date	Event	Name	Nationality	Time	Record
15 September	Final	Mohamed Samy	Egypt	2:01.21	CR

== Results ==
=== Heats ===
The heats were started on 15 September at 09:55.

Rank	Name	Nationality	Time	Notes
1	Mohamed Samy	Egypt	2:08.46	Q
2	Ahmed Hamdy	Egypt	2:08.80	Q
3	Ramzi Chouchar	Algeria	2:09.04	Q
4	Ayrton Sweeney	South Africa	2:09.12	Q
5	Moncef Aymen Balamane	Algeria	2:09.67	Q
6	Said Saber	Morocco	2:09.72	Q
7	Haythem Mbarki	Tunisia	2:10.26	Q
8	Ma'az Khota	South Africa	2:10.51	Q
9	Mathieu Marquet	Mauritius	2:10.83	
10	Mohamed Malek Masmoudi	Tunisia	2:10.96	
11	Atuhaire Ambala	Uganda	2:28.78	
12	Ahmed Izzeldin Salih	Sudan	2:39.78	

=== Final ===
The final was started on 15 September.

Rank	Lane	Name	Nationality	Time	Notes
1st place, gold medalist(s)	4	Mohamed Samy	Egypt	2:01.21	CR
2nd place, silver medalist(s)	6	Ayrton Sweeney	South Africa	2:02.16	
3rd place, bronze medalist(s)	2	Moncef Aymen Balamane	Algeria	2:05.23	
4	5	Ahmed Hamdy	Egypt	2:05.53	
5	3	Ramzi Chouchar	Algeria	2:08.96	
6	7	Said Saber	Morocco	2:10.08	
7	1	Haythem Mbarki	Tunisia	2:10.32	
8	8	Ma'az Khota	South Africa	2:11.53	
