= 2018 African Swimming Championships – Men's 400 metre freestyle =

Men's 400 metre freestyle at the 2018 African Swimming Championships
- Venue: Mohamed Boudiaf Olympic Complex
- Dates: 13 September (heats and final)
- Competitors: 13 from 8 nations
- Winning time: 3:51.12

Medalists
gold medal	Marwan Elkamash	Egypt
silver medal	Marwan El-Amrawy	Egypt
bronze medal	Mohamed Aziz Ghaffari	Tunisia

The Men's 400 metre freestyle competition of the 2018 African Swimming Championships was held on 13 September 2018.

== Records ==
Prior to the competition, the existing world and championship records were as follows.

	Name	Nation	Time	Location	Date
World record	Paul Biedermann	Germany	3:40.07	Rome	26 July 2009
African record	Oussama Mellouli	Tunisia	3:41.11	Rome	26 July 2009
Championship record	Jay-Cee Thomson	South Africa	3:53.12	Casablanca	16 September 2010

The following new records were set during this competition.

Date	Event	Name	Nationality	Time	Record
13 September	Final	Marwan Elkamash	Egypt	3:51.12	CR

== Results ==
=== Heats ===
The heats were started on 13 September at 09:40.

Rank	Name	Nationality	Time	Notes
1	Marwan Elkamash	Egypt	4:01.31	Q
2	Ruan Breytenbach	South Africa	4:02.71	Q
3	Lounis Khendriche	Algeria	4:02.83	Q
4	Mohamed Aziz Ghaffari	Tunisia	4:03.46	Q
5	Mohamed Djaballah	Algeria	4:03.51	Q
6	Marwan El-Amrawy	Egypt	4:06.59	Q
7	Mohamed Agili	Tunisia	4:06.77	Q
8	Righardt Muller	South Africa	4:11.64	Q
9	Mathieu Marquet	Mauritius	4:14.12	
10	Amadou Ndiaye	Senegal	4:15.97	
11	Dean Hoffman	Seychelles	4:21.38	
12	Ovesh Purahoo	Mauritius	4:45.72	
13	Zinhle Bekker	Botswana	4:53.56	

=== Final ===
The final was started on 10 September.

Rank	Lane	Name	Nationality	Time	Notes
1st place, gold medalist(s)	4	Marwan Elkamash	Egypt	3:51.12	CR
2nd place, silver medalist(s)	7	Marwan El-Amrawy	Egypt	3:55.52	
3rd place, bronze medalist(s)	6	Mohamed Aziz Ghaffari	Tunisia	3:56.68	
4	3	Lounis Khendriche	Algeria	3:56.95	
5	1	Mohamed Agili	Tunisia	3:57.89	
6	2	Mohamed Djaballah	Algeria	3:58.67	
7	5	Ruan Breytenbach	South Africa	4:00.42	
8	8	Righardt Muller	South Africa	4:09.79	
