= 2018 African Swimming Championships – Men's 1500 metre freestyle =

Men's 1500 metre freestyle at the 2018 African Swimming Championships
- Venue: Mohamed Boudiaf Olympic Complex
- Dates: 14 September (final)
- Competitors: 9 from 5 nations
- Winning time: 15:26.40

Medalists
| gold medal | Marwan Elkamash | Egypt |
| silver medal | Marwan El-Amrawy | Egypt |
| bronze medal | Ahmed Hafnaoui | Tunisia |

The Men's 1500 metre freestyle competition of the 2018 African Swimming Championships was held on 14 September 2018.

== Records ==
Prior to the competition, the existing world and championship records were as follows.

| | Name | Nation | Time | Location | Date |
|---|---|---|---|---|---|
| World record | Sun Yang | China | 14:31.02 | London | 4 August 2012 |
| African record | Oussama Mellouli | Tunisia | 14:37.28 | Rome | 2 August 2009 |
| Championship record | Troyden Prinsloo | South Africa | 15:29.93 | Casablanca | 7 May 2004 |

The following new records were set during this competition.

| Date | Event | Name | Nationality | Time | Record |
|---|---|---|---|---|---|
| 14 September | Final | Marwan Elkamash | Egypt | 15:26.40 | CR |

== Results ==
=== Final ranking ===
The races were started on 14 September at 10:00.

| Rank | Name | Nationality | Time | Notes |
|---|---|---|---|---|
| 1st place, gold medalist(s) | Marwan Elkamash | Egypt | 15:26.40 | CR |
| 2nd place, silver medalist(s) | Marwan El-Amrawy | Egypt | 15:32.23 | |
| 3rd place, bronze medalist(s) | Ahmed Hafnaoui | Tunisia | 15:45.46 | |
| 4 | Ruan Breytenbach | South Africa | 15:56.54 | |
| 5 | Mohamed Djaballah | Algeria | 15:57.39 | |
| 6 | Mohamed Agili | Tunisia | 16:12.46 | |
| 7 | Ali Merouane Betka | Algeria | 16:29.04 | |
| 8 | Righardt Muller | South Africa | 16:30.89 | |
| 9 | Amadou Ndiaye | Senegal | 17:06.71 | |
