= 2018 African Swimming Championships – Men's 400 metre individual medley =

Men's 400 metre individual medley at the 2018 African Swimming Championships
- Venue: Mohamed Boudiaf Olympic Complex
- Dates: 11 September (final)
- Competitors: 8 from 6 nations
- Winning time: 4:21.69

Medalists
gold medal	Ayrton Sweeney	South Africa
silver medal	Ruan Breytenbach	South Africa
bronze medal	Ahmed Hamdy	Egypt

The Men's 400 metre individual medley competition of the 2018 African Swimming Championships was held on 11 September 2018.

== Records ==
Prior to the competition, the existing world and championship records were as follows.

	Name	Nation	Time	Location	Date
World record	Michael Phelps	United States	4:03.84	Beijing	10 August 2008
African record	Oussama Mellouli	Tunisia	4:10.53	Pescara	29 June 2009
Championship record	Jay-Cee Thomson	South Africa	4:21.06	Casablanca	14 September 2010

== Results ==
=== Final ===
The final was started on 11 September.

Rank	Name	Nationality	Time	Notes
1st place, gold medalist(s)	Ayrton Sweeney	South Africa	4:21.69	
2nd place, silver medalist(s)	Ruan Breytenbach	South Africa	4:25.80	
3rd place, bronze medalist(s)	Ahmed Hamdy	Egypt	4:26.73	
4	Ramzi Chouchar	Algeria	4:29.82	
5	Haythem Mbarki	Tunisia	4:32.15	
6	Mohamed Malek Masmoudi	Tunisia	4:32.28	
7	Said Saber	Morocco	4:32.71	
8	Mathieu Marquet	Mauritius	4:47.78	
