= 2018 African Swimming Championships – Women's 100 metre backstroke =

Competition

Women's 100 metre backstroke at the 2018 African Swimming Championships
- Venue: Mohamed Boudiaf Olympic Complex
- Dates: 12 September (heats and final)
- Competitors: 15 from 11 nations
- Winning time: 1:04.19

Medalists
gold medal	Samiha Mohsen	Egypt
silver medal	Hannah Kiely	South Africa
bronze medal	Hiba Fahsi	Morocco

The Women's 100 metre backstroke competition of the 2018 African Swimming Championships was held on 12 September 2018.

== Records ==
Prior to the competition, the existing world and championship records were as follows.

	Name	Nation	Time	Location	Date
World record	Kathleen Baker	United States	58.00	Irvine	28 July 2018
African record	Kirsty Coventry	Zimbabwe	58.77	Beijing	11 August 2008
Championship record	Chanelle Van Wyk	South Africa	1:02.32	Casablanca	15 September 2010

== Results ==
=== Heats ===
The heats were started on 10 September at 10:00.

Rank	Name	Nationality	Time	Notes
1	Samiha Mohsen	Egypt	1:05.30	Q
2	Hiba Fahsi	Morocco	1:05.86	Q
3	Hannah Kiely	South Africa	1:06.58	Q
4	Camille Koenig	Mauritius	1:06.84	Q
5	Khwezi Duma	South Africa	1:08.05	Q
6	Imene Kawthar Zitouni	Algeria	1:09.66	Q
7	Menna Kchouk	Tunisia	1:09.76	Q
8	Catarina Sousa	Angola	1:10.23	Q
9	Imara-Bella Thorpe	Kenya	1:10.43	
10	Yasmeen Boutouil	Morocco	1:10.66	
11	Jihane Benchadli	Algeria	1:11.95	
12	Ada Thioune	Senegal	1:18.12	
	Jannat Bique	Mozambique	Did not finish	
	Chinoye Okolugbo	Nigeria	Did not start	
	Mappy Kegbe	Nigeria	Did not start	

=== Final ===
The final was started on 10 September.

Rank	Lane	Name	Nationality	Time	Notes
1st place, gold medalist(s)	4	Samiha Mohsen	Egypt	1:04.19	
2nd place, silver medalist(s)	3	Hannah Kiely	South Africa	1:04.53	
3rd place, bronze medalist(s)	5	Hiba Fahsi	Morocco	1:05.98	
4	6	Camille Koenig	Mauritius	1:06.83	
5	2	Khwezi Duma	South Africa	1:08.16	
6	7	Imene Kawthar Zitouni	Algeria	1:08.57	
7	8	Catarina Sousa	Angola	1:09.53	
8	1	Menna Kchouk	Tunisia	1:09.85	
