= Jeanne Boutbien =

French-Senegalese swimmer

Personal information
- Nationality: French; Senegalese
- Born: 8 April 1999 (age 27) Dakar, Senegal

Sport
- Sport: Swimming
Medal record
Women's swimming
Representing Senegal
African Championships
Bronze medal – third place	2021 Accra	4×100 m mixed freestyle

Jeanne Boutbien (born 8 April 1999) is a French-Senegalese swimmer. She competed in the women's 100 metre freestyle event at the 2017 World Aquatics Championships.

== Career ==
In 2019, she represented Senegal at the 2019 World Aquatics Championships held in Gwangju, South Korea. She competed in the women's 50 metre freestyle and women's 100 metre freestyle events. In both events she did not advance to compete in the semi-finals. She also competed in two mixed relay events, without winning a medal. In 2019, she also represented Senegal at the 2019 African Games held in Rabat, Morocco. She competed in both the women's 50 metre freestyle and women's 100 metre freestyle events, without winning a medal.

She competed in the women's 100 metre freestyle event at the 2020 Summer Olympics.

== Personal life ==
She was born in Dakar to French parents from Trégunc and obtained Senegalese citizenship in 2016.

Olympic Games
Preceded by Isabelle Sambou	Flag bearer for Senegal; Tokyo 2020 with Mbagnick Ndiaye	Succeeded by Louis François Mendy; Combe Seck
