= 2021 African Swimming Championships =

14th African Swimming Championships
- Host city: Accra, Ghana
- Date(s): 11–17 October
- Events: 43

The 14th African Swimming Championships were held from 11 to 17 October 2021 at the Trust Sports Emporium in Accra, Ghana.

== Participating countries ==
- Algeria
- Angola
- Benin
- Botswana
- Burkina Faso
- Burundi
- Cape Verde
- Egypt
- Gambia
- Ghana
- Guinea
- Madagascar
- Malawi
- Mauritius
- Morocco
- Mozambique
- Mali
- Niger
- Nigeria
- Namibia
- Senegal
- Seychelles
- South Africa
- Sudan
- Eswatini
- Tanzania
- Tunisia
- Uganda
- Zimbabwe

== Medal table ==
* Host nation (Ghana)

Rank	Nation	Gold	Silver	Bronze	Total
1	South Africa (RSA)	25	24	10	59
2	Egypt (EGY)	15	14	11	40
3	Algeria (ALG)	2	2	7	11
4	Senegal (SEN)	1	0	4	5
5	Tunisia (TUN)	0	2	0	2
6	Ghana (GHA)*	0	1	1	2
7	Mauritius (MRI)	0	1	0	1
8	Angola (ANG)	0	0	5	5
9	Cape Verde (CPV)	0	0	2	2
10	Morocco (MAR)	0	0	1	1
10	Namibia (NAM)	0	0	1	1
Totals (11 entries)		43	44	42	129

== Medal summary ==
=== Men ===
Games	Gold		Silver		Bronze	
50m freestyle	Ali Khalafalla; Egypt	22.48	Guy Brooks; South Africa	22.60	Yassin Hossam; Egypt	22.69
100m freestyle	Mohamed Samy; Egypt	50.23	Guy Brooks; South Africa	50.34	Clayton Jimmie; South Africa	50.79
200m freestyle	Marwan Elkamash; Egypt	1:50.17	Andrew Ross; South Africa	1:51.63	Guy Brooks; South Africa	1:51.99
400m freestyle	Marwan Elkamash; Egypt	3:55.93	Mohamed Ben Ajmia; Tunisia	3:59.97	Roberto Gomes; South Africa	4:03.72
800m freestyle	Marwan Elkamash; Egypt	8:04.88	Mohamed Moselhy; Egypt	8:06.25	Roberto Gomes; South Africa	8:27.33
1500m freestyle	Marwan Elkamash; Egypt	15:40.65	Mohamed Moselhy; Egypt	15:51.80	Roberto Gomes; South Africa	16:24.33
50m backstroke	Mohamed Samy; Egypt	25.34; CR	Abdellah Ardjoune; Algeria	25.78	Aly Khala Falah; Egypt	26.97
100m backstroke	Mohamed Samy; Egypt	56.23	Martin Binedell; South Africa	56.57	Abdellah Ardjoune; Algeria	56.67
200m backstroke	Martin Binedell; South Africa	2:00.54; CR	Mohamed Mohamady; Egypt	2:03.07	Ruan Ras; South Africa	2:03.98
50m breaststroke	Youssef Elkamash; Egypt	28.08	Matthew Randle; South Africa	28.70	Ronan Wantenaar; Namibia	28.71
100m breaststroke	Youssef Elkamash; Egypt	1:02.05	Matthew Randle; South Africa	1:03.06	Jaouad Syoud; Algeria	1:03.10
200m breaststroke	Bailey Musgrave; South Africa	2:14.47	Matthew Randle; South Africa	2:15.03	Youssef Elkamash; Egypt	2:18.03
50m butterfly	Clayton Jimmie; South Africa	24.13	Abeiku Jackson; Ghana Ali Khalafalla; Egypt	24.18	Not awarded	
100m butterfly	Jaouad Syoud; Algeria	52.89	Guy Brooks; South Africa	53.91	Abeiku Jackson; Ghana	53.98
200m butterfly	Ross Hartigan; South Africa	2:00.10; CR	Ras Ruan; South Africa	2:01.67	Ramzi Chouchar; Algeria	2:06.88
200m individual medley	Jaouad Syoud; Algeria	2:02.46	Mohamed Samy; Egypt	2:04.53	Yassin Elshamaa; Egypt	2:04.60
400m individual medley	Ruan Ras; South Africa	4:24.46	Yassin Elshamaa; Egypt	4:27.27	Salah Nour; Egypt	4:29.80
4x100m freestyle relay	Egypt	3:20.04; CR	South Africa	3:21.04	Senegal	3:32.93
4x200m freestyle relay	Egypt; Yassine Elshammaa; Mohamed Mohamady; Mohamed Samy Hassan; Marwan Elkamash	7:29.60	South Africa; Andrew Ross; Ross Hartigan; Luca Holtzhausen; Guy Brooks	7:34.09	Senegal; Amaduo N'Diaye; Matthieu Seye; Karl Wilson Aimable; Ousseynou Diop	7:58.65
4x100m medley relay	Egypt	3:41.70; CR	South Africa	3:45.80	Angola	4:02.03 NR
3 km open water	Mohamed Moselhy; Egypt	32:45.11	Mohamed Khalil Ben Ajmia; Tunisia	32:56.98	Ramzi Chouchar; Algeria	33:05.69

=== Women ===
Games	Gold		Silver		Bronze	
50m freestyle	Inge Weidemann; South Africa	25.83	Caitlin De Lange; South Africa	26.15	Amel Melih; Algeria	26.23
100m freestyle	Rebecca Meder; South Africa	56.22	Inge Weidemann; South Africa	56.31	Amel Melih; Algeria	57.58
200m freestyle	Rebecca Meder; South Africa	2:02.65	Christin Mundell; South Africa	2:04.60	Catarina Sousa; Angola	2:10.78
400m freestyle	Christin Mundell; South Africa	4:40.02	Stephanie Houtman; South Africa	4:40.17	Sara Abdelghany; Egypt	4:44.73
800m freestyle	Stephanie Houtman; South Africa	9:07.14	Samantha Randle; South Africa	9:07.95	Sara Abdelghany; Egypt	9:54.84
50m backstroke	Samiha Mohsen; Egypt	29.17	Amel Melih; Algeria	30.02	Caitlin De Lange; South Africa	30.09
100m backstroke	Rebecca Meder; South Africa	1:02.90	Samiha Mohsen; Egypt	1:04.73	Samantha Randle; South Africa	1:06.01
200m backstroke	Rebecca Meder; South Africa	2:16.74	Samantha Randle; South Africa	2:17.21	Samiha Mohsen; Egypt	2:23.00
50m breaststroke	Christin Mundell; South Africa	32.64	Sarah Soliman; Egypt	33.83	Jayla Pina; Cape Verde	34.65
100m breaststroke	Emily Visagie; South Africa	1:10.81; CR	Christin Mundell; South Africa	1:11.09	Nour Elgendy; Egypt	1:12.74
200m breaststroke	Emily Visagie; South Africa	2:35.35	Tessa Ip Hen Cheung; Mauritius	2:47.39	Reedah Shaw; South Africa	2:50.78
50m butterfly	Inge Weidemann; South Africa	27.14	Caitlin De Lange; South Africa	27.66	Amel Melih; Algeria	27.68
100m butterfly	Oumy Diop; Senegal	1:03.13	Inge Weidemann; South Africa	1:04.09	Lizanne Viljoen; South Africa	1:04.19
200m butterfly	Lizanne Viljoen; South Africa	2:19.35	Rawan Eldamaty; Egypt	2:23.07	Sara Abdelghany; Egypt	2:24.23
200m individual medley	Rebecca Meder; South Africa	2:15.45; CR	Emily Visagie; South Africa	2:24.45	Jayla Pina; Cape Verde	2:27.06
400m individual medley	Rebecca Meder; South Africa	4:55.36	Christin Mundell; South Africa	5:10.80	Sara Abdelghany; Egypt	5:20.43
4x100m freestyle relay	South Africa; Inge Weidemann; Caitlin De Lange; Hannah Robertson; Rebecca Meder	3:49.91; CR	Egypt; Nour Elgendy; Carine Abdelmalak; Farida Samra; Sara Elsammany	3:56.71	Senegal; Jeanne Boutbien; Mariama Drame; Oumy Diop; Ndèye Dièye	4:11.35
4x200m freestyle relay	South Africa	8:26.35; CR	Egypt	8:44.22	Angola	9:14.26
4x100m medley relay	South Africa	4:16.22	Egypt	4:19.34	Angola	4:40.76
3 km open water	Samantha Randle; South Africa	37:11.35	Stephanie Houtman; South Africa	38:23.18	Ayat Allah Elanouar; Morocco	38:48.52

=== Mixed ===
Games	Gold		Silver		Bronze	
4x100m freestyle relay	South Africa; Andrew Ross; Inge Weidemann; Rebecca Meder; Guy Brooks	3:34.02; CR	Egypt; Mohamed Samy Hassan; Ali Khalfalla; Diaa Nour; Farida Samra	3:39.03	Senegal; El Hadji Adama Hassan; Jeanne Boutbien; Matthieu Ousmane Seye; Oumy Diop	3:46.25
4x100m medley relay	South Africa	3:56.74	Egypt	3:58.28	Angola	4:14.58 NR
