= 2018 African Swimming Championships =

13th African Swimming Championships
- Host city: Algiers, Algeria
- Date: 10–16 September
- Events: 44

The 13th African Swimming Championships were held from 10 to 16 September 2018 at the Mohamed Boudiaf Olympic Complex in Algiers, Algeria and at Boukourdane Lake.

== Participating countries ==
- Algeria
- Angola
- Benin
- Botswana
- Burkina Faso
- Burundi
- Cape Verde
- Djibouti
- Egypt
- Gambia
- Ghana
- Guinea
- Kenya
- Libya
- Madagascar
- Malawi
- Mauritius
- Morocco
- Mozambique
- Niger
- Rwanda
- Senegal
- Seychelles
- South Africa
- Sudan
- Eswatini
- Togo
- Tunisia
- Uganda
- Zambia
- Zimbabwe

== Medal standings ==
Host nation

Rank	Nation	Gold	Silver	Bronze	Total
1	Egypt (EGY)	28	14	6	48
2	South Africa (RSA)	12	18	10	40
3	Algeria (ALG)*	3	6	13	22
4	Tunisia (TUN)	1	3	8	12
5	Morocco (MAR)	0	2	4	6
6	Mauritius (MRI)	0	1	1	2
6	Zambia (ZAM)	0	1	1	2
Totals (7 entries)		44	45	43	132

== Results ==
=== Men ===
Games	Gold		Silver		Bronze	
50m freestyle	Ali Khalafalla; Egypt	22.51	Bradley Vincent; Mauritius	22.86	Abdelrahman Sameh; Egypt	23.03
100m freestyle	Mohamed Samy; Egypt	49.39; CR	Ali Khalafalla; Egypt	49.89	Bradley Vincent; Mauritius	50.24
200m freestyle	Mohamed Samy; Egypt	1:49.62; CR	Marwan Elkamash; Egypt	1:49.88	Mohamed Aziz Ghaffari; Tunisia	1:50.07
400m freestyle	Marwan Elkamash; Egypt	3:51.12; CR	Marwan El-Amrawy; Egypt	3:55.52	Mohamed Aziz Ghaffari; Tunisia	3:56.68
800m freestyle	Marwan Elkamash; Egypt	8:02.37; CR	Marwan El-Amrawy; Egypt	8:07.42	Ahmed Hafnaoui; Tunisia	8:08.74
1500m freestyle	Marwan Elkamash; Egypt	15:26.40; CR	Marwan El-Amrawy; Egypt	15:32.23	Ahmed Hafnaoui; Tunisia	15:45.46
50m backstroke	Mohamed Samy; Egypt	25.49; CR	Jacques van Wyk; South Africa	25.90	Abdellah Ardjoune; Algeria	26.54
100m backstroke	Mohamed Samy; Egypt	55.49; CR	Jacques van Wyk; South Africa	55.54	Ali Khalafalla; Egypt	56.70
200m backstroke	Mohamed Ryad Bouhamidi; Algeria	2:05.13	Jacques van Wyk; South Africa	2:05.76	Mohamed Samy; Egypt	2:06.88
50m breaststroke	Youssef Elkamash; Egypt	28.04	Wassim Elloumi; Tunisia	28.25 =NR	Alaric Basson; South Africa	28.42
100m breaststroke	Wassim Elloumi; Tunisia	1:01.26; CR, NR	Youssef Elkamash; Egypt Alaric Basson; South Africa	1:01.54	Not awarded	
200m breaststroke	Ayrton Sweeney; South Africa	2:14.04; CR	Wassim Elloumi; Tunisia	2:15.76	Alaric Basson; South Africa	2:16.16
50m butterfly	Abdelrahman Sameh; Egypt	23.71	Ali Khalafalla; Egypt	24.10	Yusuf Tibazi; Morocco	24.11; NR
100m butterfly	Mohamed Samy; Egypt	53.72	Yusuf Tibazi; Morocco	54.20	Ralph Goveia; Zambia	54.53
200m butterfly	Marwan Elkamash; Egypt	2:00.96	Ruan Breytenbach; South Africa	2:01.20	Said Saber; Morocco	2:02.49
200m individual medley	Mohamed Samy; Egypt	2:01.21; CR	Ayrton Sweeney; South Africa	2:02.16	Moncef Aymen Balamane; Algeria	2:05.23
400m individual medley	Ayrton Sweeney; South Africa	4:21.69	Ruan Breytenbach; South Africa	4:25.80	Ahmed Hamdi; Egypt	4:26.73
4 × 100 m freestyle relay	Egypt; Abdelrahman Sameh (51.42); Marwan Elkamash (50.91); Mohamed Samy (49.88); Ali Khalafalla (49.40)	3:21.61; CR	South Africa; Jacques van Wyk (51.60); Matthew Bowers (52.21); Alaric Basson (51.71); Ayrton Sweeney (51.28)	3:26.80	Tunisia; Mohamed Mehdi Agili (51.72); Ahmed Hafnaoui (52.55); Mohamed Ali Chaouchi (53.03); Mohamed Aziz Ghaffari (50.62)	3:27.92
4 × 200 m freestyle relay	Egypt; Marwan El-Amrawy (1:51.24); Marwan Elkamash (1:49.81); Ahmed Hamdy (1:53.20); Mohamed Samy (1:53.85)	7:28.10; CR	Tunisia; Mohamed Mehdi Agili (1:51.44); Mohamed Ali Chaouchi (1:55.74); Ahmed Hafnaoui (1:53.21); Mohamed Aziz Ghaffari (1:51.16)	7:31.55	South Africa; Ruan Breytenbach (1:56.78); Alaric Basson (1:55.03); Ayrton Sweeney (1:51.75); Alard Basson (1:54.63)	7:38.19
4 × 100 m medley relay	Egypt; Mohamed Samy; Youssef Elkamash; Marwan Elkamash; Ali Khalafalla	3:42.87; CR	South Africa; Jacques van Wyk; Alaric Basson; Alard Basson; Ayrton Sweeney	3:43.21	Algeria; Abdallah Ardjoune; Moncef Aymen Balamane; Lounis Khendriche; Mehdi Nazim Benbara	3:48.26
5 km open water	Marwan El-Amrawy; Egypt	57:55.21	Said Saber; Morocco	58:21.42	Adel El-Behary; Egypt	59:23.50

=== Women ===
Games	Gold		Silver		Bronze	
50m freestyle	Farida Osman; Egypt	25.11; CR	Erin Gallagher; South Africa	25.17	Amel Melih; Algeria	26.15
100m freestyle	Erin Gallagher; South Africa	54.79; CR	Farida Osman; Egypt	56.80	Nesrine Medjahed; Algeria	58.09
200m freestyle	Hania Moro; Egypt	2:04.46	Jessica Whelan; South Africa	2:06.14	Janie Coetzer; South Africa	2:07.08
400m freestyle	Hania Moro; Egypt	4:21.76	Jessica Whelan; South Africa	4:23.76	Souad Nafissa Cherouati; Algeria	4:24.42
800m freestyle	Hania Moro; Egypt	8:56.95	Souad Nafissa Cherouati; Algeria	9:01.68	Janie Coetzer; South Africa	9:12.79
1500m freestyle	Hania Moro; Egypt	17:15.45	Souad Nafissa Cherouati; Algeria	17:21.41	Samantha Randle; South Africa	17:25.08
50m backstroke	Erin Gallagher; South Africa	29.04; CR	Samiha Mohsen; Egypt	29.51; NR	Amel Melih; Algeria	29.67
100m backstroke	Samiha Mohsen; Egypt	1:04.19	Hannah Kiely; South Africa	1:04.53	Hiba Fahsi; Morocco	1:05.98
200m backstroke	Samantha Randle; South Africa	2:17.15	Hannah Kiely; South Africa	2:22.01	Hiba Fahsi; Morocco	2:22.18
50m breaststroke	Lara van Niekerk; South Africa	31.99; CR	Tilka Paljk; Zambia	32.15	Jade Simons; South Africa	33.10
100m breaststroke	Lara van Niekerk; South Africa	1:11.13	Rowaida Hesham; Egypt	1:12.01	Jade Simons; South Africa	1:12.19
200m breaststroke	Lara van Niekerk; South Africa	2:35.25	Rowaida Hesham; Egypt	2:38.99	Hamida Rania Nefsi; Algeria	2:40.10
50m butterfly	Farida Osman; Egypt	26.16; CR	Erin Gallagher; South Africa	26.64	Amel Melih; Algeria	27.52
100m butterfly	Farida Osman; Egypt	59.03; CR	Erin Gallagher; South Africa	1:00.45	Nesrine Medjahed; Algeria	1:04.75
200m butterfly	Rowida Hesham; Egypt	2:20.25	Hamida Rania Nefsi; Algeria	2:21.59	Jessica Whelan; South Africa	2:22.79
200m individual medley	Jessica Whelan; South Africa	2:19.91	Hamida Rania Nefsi; Algeria	2:21.72	Farah Ben Khelil; Tunisia	2:21.76
400m individual medley	Hamida Rania Nefsi; Algeria	4:56.96	Samantha Randle; South Africa	4:59.75	Jessica Whelan; South Africa	5:00.66
4 × 100 m freestyle relay	South Africa; Lesley Blignaut (59.86); Hannah Kiely (58.67); Janie Coetzer (59.34); Erin Gallagher (54.76)	3:52.63	Egypt; Hania Moro (59.06); Rowida Hesham (1:02.36); Samiha Mohsen (58.65); Farida Osman (55.20)	3:55.27	Algeria; Nesrine Medjahed (57.98); Hamida Rania Nefsi (1:00.26); Souad Nafissa Cherouati (1:00.33); Amel Melih (57.08)	3:55.65; NR
4 × 200 m freestyle relay	South Africa; Jessica Whelan (2:08.08); Janie Coetzer (2:06.89); Tori Oliver (2:12.89); Erin Gallagher (2:02.03)	8:29.89	Algeria; Amel Melih; Majda Chebaraka; Hamida Rania Nefsi; Nesrine Medjahed	8:33.30; NR	Tunisia; Menna Kchouk (2:11.78); Alia Gara (2:20.38); Habiba Belghith (2:14.34); Farah Benkhelil (2:18.90)	9:05.40
4 × 100 m medley relay	South Africa; Hannah Kiely (1:04.94); Lara van Niekerk (1:10.40); Erin Gallagher (58.55); Lesley Blignaut (58.94)	4:12.83	Egypt; Samiha Mohsen (1:04.39); Rowida Hesham (1:13.18); Farida Osman (59.41); Hania Moro (58.98)	4:15.96	Algeria; Imene Kawthar Zitouni (1:09.06); Hamida Rania Nefsi (1:15.80); Nesrine Medjahed (1:04.53); Amel Melih (57.07)	4:26.46
5 km open water	Souad Nafissa Cherouati; Algeria	1:02:49.02	Sandy Atef; Egypt	1:02:50.48	Dana Akl; Egypt	1:03:43.81

=== Mixed ===
Games	Gold		Silver		Bronze	
4 × 100 m freestyle relay	Egypt; Ali Khalafalla (50.84); Samiha Mohsen (1:00.37); Farida Osman (56.58); Mohamed Samy (49.15)	3:36.94; CR, NR	South Africa; Jacques van Wyk (51.08); Alaric Basson (51.58); Erin Gallagher (55.02); Hannah Kiely (59.36); Matthew Bowers^{[a]} Lesley Blignaut^{[a]} Janie Coetzer^{[a]} Ayrton Sweeney^{[a]}	3:37.04	Algeria; Aimen Benabid (52.77); Mehdi Nazim Benbara (51.23); Nesrine Medjahed (59.48); Amel Melih (56.91)	3:40.39; NR
4 × 100 m medley relay	Egypt; Samiha Mohsen (1:04.65); Youssef El-Kamash (1:01.45); Farida Osman (1:00.31); Mohamed Samy (49.47)	3:55.88; CR, NR	Algeria; Abdellah Ardjoune (57.07); Moncef Aymen Balamane (1:03.00); Nesrine Medjahed (1:05.76); Amel Melih (56.96)	4:02.79; NR	Tunisia; Farah Ben Khelil (1:06.88); Wassim Elloumi (1:01.00); Alia Gara (1:06.56); Mohamed Mehdi Agili (51.17); Adnane Beji^{[a]} Haythem Mbarki^{[a]}	4:05.61

^{a} Swimmers who participated in the heats only and received medals.
