= Rebecca Meder =

South African swimmer (born 2002)

Personal information
- Nationality: South African
- Born: 31 July 2002 (age 24) Cape Town, South Africa

Sport
- Sport: Swimming
Medal record
Women's swimming
Representing South Africa
Commonwealth Games
Bronze medal – third place	2026 Glasgow	4×100 m relay
Bronze medal – third place	2026 Glasgow	4×100 m medley relay
African Championships
Gold medal – first place	2016 Bloemfontein	200 m medley
Gold medal – first place	2016 Bloemfontein	400 m medley
Gold medal – first place	2016 Bloemfontein	4×200 m freestyle
Gold medal – first place	2021 Accra	100 m freestyle
Gold medal – first place	2021 Accra	200 m freestyle
Gold medal – first place	2021 Accra	100 m backstroke
Gold medal – first place	2021 Accra	200 m backstroke
Gold medal – first place	2021 Accra	200 m medley
Gold medal – first place	2021 Accra	400 m medley
Gold medal – first place	2021 Accra	4×100 m freestyle
Gold medal – first place	2021 Accra	4×200 m freestyle
Gold medal – first place	2021 Accra	4×100 m medley
Gold medal – first place	2021 Accra	4×100 m mixed freestyle
Gold medal – first place	2021 Accra	4×100 m mixed medley
Silver medal – second place	2016 Bloemfontein	200 m freestyle
Commonwealth Youth Games
Silver medal – second place	2017 Nassau	400 m medley
Bronze medal – third place	2017 Nassau	200 m freestyle
Bronze medal – third place	2017 Nassau	800 m freestyle
African Junior Championships
Gold medal – first place	2017 Cairo	100 m freestyle
Gold medal – first place	2017 Cairo	400 m freestyle
Gold medal – first place	2017 Cairo	800 m freestyle
Gold medal – first place	2017 Cairo	200 m medley
Gold medal – first place	2017 Cairo	400 m medley
Gold medal – first place	2017 Cairo	4×100 m freestyle
Gold medal – first place	2017 Cairo	4×200 m freestyle
Silver medal – second place	2017 Cairo	200 m freestyle

Rebecca Meder (born 31 July 2002) is a South-African-born swimmer who represented South Africa until November 2026, and has since represented New Zealand.. She is the African record holder in the 100 metre individual medley and the South African record holder in the long course and short course 200 metre individual medley. At the 2022 World Short Course Championships, she placed sixth in the final of the 100 metre individual medley. In the 200 metre individual medley at the 2022 Commonwealth Games, she placed fourth in the final. At the 2021 African Championships, she won 11 gold medals, six in individual events and five in relay events, swimming on the finals relay for each of the five relay events.

== Career ==
Meder qualified to compete at the 2018 World Short Course Championships in the 200 metre individual medley when she was 16 years old. She competed in the women's 200 metre freestyle at the 2019 World Aquatics Championships. In 2021, she represented South Africa at the 2020 Summer Olympics held in Tokyo, Japan. Following the Olympic Games, she returned to international competition in October at the 2021 African Swimming Championships in Accra, Ghana, winning a total of eleven gold medals, six in the individual events 100 metre freestyle, 200 metre freestyle, 100 metre backstroke, 200 metre backstroke, 200 metre individual medley, 400 metre individual medley, and five as a finals relay member in the 4×100 metre freestyle relay, 4×200 metre freestyle relay, 4×100 metre medley relay, 4×100 metre mixed freestyle relay, and 4×100 metre mixed medley relay.

=== 2022 ===
From her performances at the 2022 South Africa National Swimming Championships, Meder was named to the South Africa team for the 2022 World Aquatics Championships in the 100 metre backstroke, 200 metre individual medley, and 400 metre individual medley. She did not enter to compete in the events at the Championships. In June, she was named to the South Africa team for the 2022 Commonwealth Games.

==== 2022 Commonwealth Games ====
Meder placed ninth in the 400 metre individual medley at the 2022 Commonwealth Games, held in Birmingham, England, with a time of 4:51.65. The following day, she finished fourth in her preliminaries heat in the 100 metre backstroke and qualified for the semifinals. She qualified for the final in the evening semifinals. For the preliminaries of the 50 metre butterfly on day three, she tied Quah Ting Wen of Singapore for eleventh-rank with a time of 27.16 seconds and qualified for the semifinals. Later in the day, she placed eleventh in the semifinals with a time of 26.84 seconds and did not qualify for the final. Approximately 90 minutes later, she placed seventh in the final of the 100 metre backstroke.

On the fourth day of competition, Meder ranked second in the preliminaries of the 200 metre individual medley with a 2:12.57, which was 0.45 seconds behind first-ranked Summer McIntosh of Canada, and qualified for the semifinals. She placed fourth in the final, finishing less than a second and a half behind bronze medalist Abbie Wood of England with a South African record time of 2:12.01. The following day, she started with a time of 29.55 seconds in the 50 metre backstroke preliminaries, qualifying for the semifinals ranking thirteenth. Later in the morning, she helped qualify the 4×100 metre mixed medley relay to the final ranking fourth, swimming the backstroke leg of the relay in 1:02.50. In the evening semifinals of the 50 metre backstroke, she finished in 28.69 seconds, ranking eighth overall and qualifying for the final. On the finals mixed medley relay later in the session, Pieter Coetze substituted in for her on the backstroke leg, and the relay placed fourth. On Day six, she placed eighth in the final of the 50 metre backstroke with a 28.66. Later in the finals session, she swam the backstroke portion of the 4×100 metre medley relay in 1:01.39, contributing to a fourth-place finish in a new African record and South African record time of 3:59.63.

Later in August, and following the Commonwealth Games, Meder achieved a personal best time and qualifying time for the 2022 World Short Course Championships in the 200 metre breaststroke with a 2:23.37 at the 2022 South Africa Short Course Championships.

==== 2022 World Short Course Championships ====
On the first day of the 2022 World Short Course Championships, in Melbourne, Australia, Meder placed tenth in the 200 metre individual medley with a South African record time of 2:07.47, which broke a 13-year-old record in the event from Katheryn Meaklim at 2:07.54. Later the same day, she helped achieve thirteenth place in the 4×100 metre freestyle relay, anchoring the relay with a time of 54.19 seconds to a new African record time of 3:41.57. On The second day of competition, she split a 1:57.67 for the anchor leg of the 4×200 metre freestyle relay to help place tenth in a time of 8:04.85. On the morning of day three, she set a new African record in the 100 metre individual medley with a personal best time of 59.38 seconds and advanced to the semifinals ranked eighth. Later the same morning, she helped achieve an African record in the 4×50 metre freestyle relay, splitting a 25.14 for the second leg to contribute to the record time of 1:40.50 and an overall placing of eleventh. In the evening semifinals of the 100 metre individual medley, she lowered her African record mark to 58.98 seconds and qualified for the final ranking fifth.

On the morning of day four, Meder placed nineteenth in the 200 metre breaststroke with a time of 2:23.64. In the evening, she brought the African record in the 100 metre individual medley down to 58.46 in the final of the event, finishing less than one second behind gold medalist Marrit Steenbergen of the Netherlands to place sixth. On the fifth morning, she finished in a time of 58.04 seconds in the preliminaries of the 100 metre butterfly to place nineteenth. On The sixth and final day, she helped set a new African record in the preliminaries of the 4×100 metre medley relay in a time of 3:59.64, splitting a 57.68 for the butterfly leg of the relay to help finish in twelfth-place.

=== 2023 ===
In the 200 metre individual medley on day two of the 2023 South African National Championships in April, Meder won the national title with a personal best, new South African record, and 2023 World Aquatics Championships qualifying time of 2:11.39. On the third day, she won the silver medal in the 100 metre freestyle with a personal best time of 54.88 seconds before winning the gold medal in the 400 metre individual medley with a time of 4:50.55. With a time of 59.76 seconds in the final of the 100 metre butterfly on day four, she won the silver medal. The fifth and final morning, she swam a 4:24.09 in the morning preliminaries of the 400 metre freestyle and did not go on to compete in the evening finals in the event.

At the 2026 Commonwealth Games in Glasgow, Meder won a bronze medal as part of South Africa's women's 4×100 metre freestyle relay team. The team finished in an African-record time of 3:38.67.

The relay consisted of Aimee Canny, Rebecca Meder, Erin Gallagher and Olivia Nel.

== International championships (50 m) ==
Meet	100 free	200 free	400 free	800 free	1500 free	50 back	100 back	200 back	50 fly	200 medley	400 medley	4×100 free	4×200 free	4×100 medley	4×100 mixed free	4×100 mixed medley
Junior level
AJC 2017	1st place, gold medalist(s)	2nd place, silver medalist(s)	1st place, gold medalist(s)	1st place, gold medalist(s)	—N/a					1st place, gold medalist(s)	1st place, gold medalist(s)	1st place, gold medalist(s)	1st place, gold medalist(s)			
CYG 2017		3rd place, bronze medalist(s)	4th	3rd place, bronze medalist(s)	—N/a					4th	2nd place, silver medalist(s)					
WJC 2017		24th		14th	13th					14th	7th		10th			
WJC 2019		27th								10th	17th	12th	11th		13th	15th
Senior level
AC 2016		2nd place, silver medalist(s)								1st place, gold medalist(s)	1st place, gold medalist(s)	DSQ	1st place, gold medalist(s)			
WC 2019		30th								22nd	22nd	18th				
OG 2020						—N/a			—N/a	23rd			11th		—N/a	
AC 2021	1st place, gold medalist(s)	1st place, gold medalist(s)			—N/a		1st place, gold medalist(s)	1st place, gold medalist(s)		1st place, gold medalist(s)	1st place, gold medalist(s)	1st place, gold medalist(s)	1st place, gold medalist(s)	1st place, gold medalist(s)	1st place, gold medalist(s)	1st place, gold medalist(s)
CG 2022					—N/a	8th	7th		11th	4th	9th			4th		4th

== International championships (25 m) ==
Meet	100 fly	200 breast	100 medley	200 medley	400 medley	4×50 free	4×100 free	4×200 free	4×100 medley	4×50 mixed free
WC 2018			25th	22nd	18th					13th
WC 2022	19th	19th	6th	10th		11th	13th	10th	12th	

== Personal best times ==
=== Long course metres (50 m pool) ===
Event	Time		Meet	Location	Date	Notes	Ref
100 m freestyle	54.88		2023 South Africa National Championships	Gqeberha	14 April 2023		
100 m backstroke	1:01.39	r	2022 Commonwealth Games	Birmingham, England	3 August 2022		
200 m breaststroke	2:33.07		2018 South Africa Junior Age Group Championships	Durban	25 March 2018		
100 m butterfly	1:00.48		2022 Mare Nostrum - Monte Carlo	Monte Carlo, Monaco	21 May 2022		
200 m individual medley	2:11.39		2023 South African National Championships	Gqeberha	13 April 2023	NR	

Legend: NR – South African record; e – equalled existing record;
Records not set in finals: h – heat; sf – semifinal; r – relay 1st leg; rh – relay heat 1st leg; b – B final; † – en route to final mark; so – swim-off; tt – time trial

=== Short course metres (25 m pool) ===
Event	Time		Meet	Location	Date	Notes	Ref
100 m backstroke	59.80		2020 South Africa Short Course Championships	Pietermaritzburg	26 October 2020		
200 m breaststroke	2:23.37		2022 South Africa Short Course Championships	Pietermaritzburg	14 August 2022		
100 m butterfly	57.93		2022 South Africa Short Course Championships	Pietermaritzburg	12 August 2022		
100 m individual medley	58.46		2022 World Short Course Championships	Melbourne, Australia	16 December 2022	AF, NR	
200 m individual medley	2:07.47	h	2022 World Short Course Championships	Melbourne, Australia	13 December 2022	NR	

Legend: AF – African record; NR – South African record; e – equalled existing record;
Records not set in finals: h – heat; sf – semifinal; r – relay 1st leg; rh – relay heat 1st leg; b – B final; † – en route to final mark; so – swim-off; tt – time trial
