= List of African records in swimming =

Africa

The African records in swimming are the fastest times ever by a swimmer representing an African country. These records are ratified by Africa Aquatics (previously CANA) the African Aquatic Confederation

All records were set in finals unless noted otherwise.

== Long Course (50 m) ==
=== Men ===
Event	Time		Name	Nationality	Date	Meet	Location	Ref
50 m freestyle	21.67	e	Roland Schoeman	South Africa	16 August 2008	Olympic Games	Beijing, China	
50 m freestyle	21.67	e, sf	Roland Schoeman	South Africa	2 August 2013	World Championships	Barcelona, Spain	
100 m freestyle	47.79	h	Lyndon Ferns	South Africa	29 July 2009	World Championships	Rome, Italy	
200 m freestyle	1:45.20		Chad le Clos	South Africa	8 August 2016	Olympic Games	Rio de Janeiro, Brazil	
400 m freestyle	3:40.70		Ahmed Hafnaoui	Tunisia	23 July 2023	World Championships	Fukuoka, Japan	
800 m freestyle	7:35.27		Oussama Mellouli	Tunisia	29 July 2009	World Championships	Rome, Italy	
1500 m freestyle	14:31.54		Ahmed Hafnaoui	Tunisia	30 July 2023	World Championships	Fukuoka, Japan	
50 m backstroke	24.17		Pieter Coetze	South Africa	3 August 2025	World Championships	Singapore, Singapore	
100 m backstroke	51.71	r, CR	Pieter Coetze	South Africa	29 July 2026	Commonwealth Games	Glasgow, United Kingdom	
200 m backstroke	1:53.36		Pieter Coetze	South Africa	1 August 2025	World Championships	Singapore, Singapore	
50 m breaststroke	26.38	sf,†	Michael Houlie	South Africa	24 July 2026	Commonwealth Games	Glasgow, United Kingdom	
100 m breaststroke	58.46		Cameron van der Burgh	South Africa	29 July 2012	Olympic Games	London, United Kingdom	
200 m breaststroke	2:09.61	sf	Neil Versfeld	South Africa	30 July 2009	World Championships	Rome, Italy	
50 m butterfly	22.80		Abdelrahman Sameh	Egypt	18 May 2025	Mare Nostrum	Monte Carlo, Monaco	
100 m butterfly	50.56		Chad le Clos	South Africa	8 August 2015	World Championships	Kazan, Russia	
200 m butterfly	1:52.96		Chad le Clos	South Africa	31 July 2012	Olympic Games	London, United Kingdom	
200 m individual medley	1:57.03	sf	Darian Townsend	South Africa	25 April 2009	French Championships	Montpellier, France	
400 m individual medley	4:10.53		Oussama Mellouli	Tunisia	29 June 2009	Mediterranean Games	Pescara, Italy	
4×50m freestyle relay	1:28.78		Lyndon Ferns; Roland Schoeman; Gerhard Zandberg; Ryk Neethling	South Africa	2 April 2003	-		
4×100 m freestyle relay	3:11.93		Lyndon Ferns (48.32); Graeme Moore (48.05); Darian Townsend (48.05); Roland Schoeman (47.51)	South Africa	26 July 2009	World Championships	Rome, Italy	
4×200 m freestyle relay	7:08.01	h	Jean Basson (1:45.99); Darian Townsend (1:46.22); Jan Venter (1:47.78); Sebastien Rousseau (1:48.02)	South Africa	31 July 2009	World Championships	Rome, Italy	
4×100 m medley relay	3:31.13		Pieter Coetze (51.71); Michael Houlie (59.41); Chad le Clos (51.27); Ruard van Renen (48.74)	South Africa	29 July 2026	Commonwealth Games	Glasgow, United Kingdom	

Legend: # – Record awaiting ratification by CANA; WR – World record; CR – Commonwealth record; e – equalled existing record;
Records not set in finals: h – heat; sf – semifinal; r – relay 1st leg; rh – relay heat 1st leg; b – B final; † – en route to final mark; so – swim-off; tt – time trial

=== Women ===
Event	Time		Name	Nationality	Date	Meet	Location	Ref
50m freestyle	24.62	sf	Farida Osman	Egypt	29 July 2017	World Championships	Budapest, Hungary	
100m freestyle	54.23		Erin Gallagher	South Africa	9 April 2018	Commonwealth Games	Gold Coast, Australia	
200m freestyle	1:56.59	h	Aimee Canny	South Africa	17 June 2026	TYR Pro Swim Series	Indianapolis, United States	
400m freestyle	4:07.92		Karin Prinsloo	South Africa	31 January 2014	Aquatic Super Series	Perth, Australia	
800m freestyle	8:25.71		Wendy Trott	South Africa	14 June 2012	Trofeo Sette Colli	Rome, Italy	
1500m freestyle	16:05.63	h	Wendy Trott	South Africa	25 July 2011	World Championships	Shanghai, China	
50m backstroke	27.67		Jessica Thompson	South Africa	18 March 2026	South African Youth Championships	Gqeberha, South Africa	
100m backstroke	58.77	sf	Kirsty Coventry	Zimbabwe	11 August 2008	Olympic Games	Beijing, China	
200m backstroke	2:04.81		Kirsty Coventry	Zimbabwe	1 August 2009	World Championships	Rome, Italy	
50m breaststroke	29.72	h, CR	Lara van Niekerk	South Africa	6 April 2022	South African Championships	Port Elizabeth, South Africa	
100m breaststroke	1:04.82	h, CR	Tatjana Schoenmaker	South Africa	25 July 2021	Olympic Games	Tokyo, Japan	
200m breaststroke	2:18.95	CR	Tatjana Schoenmaker	South Africa	30 July 2021	Olympic Games	Tokyo, Japan	
50m butterfly	25.38		Farida Osman	Egypt	24 June 2022	World Championships	Budapest, Hungary	
100m butterfly	57.24		Erin Gallagher	South Africa	14 August 2026	Pan Pacific Championships	Irvine, United States	
200m butterfly	2:09.41	h	Katheryn Meaklim	South Africa	12 August 2008	Olympic Games	Beijing, China	
200m individual medley	2:08.59		Kirsty Coventry	Zimbabwe	13 August 2008	Olympic Games	Beijing, China	
400m individual medley	4:29.89		Kirsty Coventry	Zimbabwe	9 August 2008	Olympic Games	Beijing, China	
4×50m freestyle relay	1:45.66		L. Kemp; K. Ross; A. Peens; V. Mohr	(South Africa) Tuks	10 April 2014	South African Championships	South Africa	
4×100m freestyle relay	3:38.67		Aimee Canny (54.40); Rebecca Meder (54.46); Erin Gallagher (55.52); Olivia Nel (54.29)	South Africa	24 July 2026	Commonwealth Games	Glasgow, United Kingdom	
4×200m freestyle relay	8:01.56	h	Aimee Canny (1:58.41); Rebecca Meder (2:00.53); Dune Coetzee (1:59.75); Erin Gallagher (2:02.87)	South Africa	28 July 2021	Olympic Games	Tokyo, Japan	
4×100m medley relay	3:58.58		Olivia Nel (1:00.38); Aimee Canny (1:06.37); Erin Gallagher (57.04); Rebecca Meder (54.79)	South Africa	29 July 2026	Commonwealth Games	Glasgow, United Kingdom	

Legend: # – Record awaiting ratification by CANA; WR – World record; CR – Commonwealth record; e – equalled existing record;
Records not set in finals: h – heat; sf – semifinal; r – relay 1st leg; rh – relay heat 1st leg; b – B final; † – en route to final mark; so – swim-off; tt – time trial

=== Mixed relay ===
Event	Time	Name	Nationality	Date	Meet	Location	Ref
4×100 m freestyle relay	3:28.51	Guy Brooks (49.55); Ruard Van Renen (49.20); Olivia Nel (54.72); Michaela De Villiers (55.04)	South Africa	21 July 2025	World University Games	Berlin, Germany	
4×100 m medley relay	3:42.61	Pieter Coetze (51.98); Michael Houlie (59.65); Erin Gallagher (57.40); Aimee Canny (53.58)	South Africa	28 July 2026	Commonwealth Games	Glasgow, United Kingdom	

Legend: # – Record awaiting ratification by CANA; WR – World record; e – equalled existing record;
Records not set in finals: h – heat; so – swim-off

== Short Course (25 m) ==
=== Men ===
Event	Time		Name	Nationality	Date	Meet	Location	Ref
50 m freestyle	20.30		Roland Schoeman	South Africa	8 August 2009	South African Championships	Pietermaritzburg, South Africa	
100 m freestyle	45.78		Chad le Clos	South Africa	6 August 2017	World Cup	Berlin, Germany	
200 m freestyle	1:40.65		Matthew Sates	South Africa	3 October 2021	World Cup	Berlin, Germany	
400 m freestyle	3:36.30		Matthew Sates	South Africa	21 October 2022	World Cup	Berlin, Germany	
800 m freestyle	7:31.93		Ahmed Jaouadi	Tunisia	14 December 2024	World Championships	Budapest, Hungary	
1500 m freestyle	14:10.94		Ahmed Hafnaoui	Tunisia	21 December 2021	World Championships	Abu Dhabi, United Arab Emirates	
50m backstroke	22.09	WR	Pieter Coetze	South Africa	9 October 2026	World Cup	Tashkent, Uzbekistan	
100m backstroke	48.21		Pieter Coetze	South Africa	10 October 2026	World Cup	Tashkent, Uzbekistan	
200m backstroke	1:47.08		George Du Rand	South Africa	7 November 2009	World Cup	Moscow, Russia	
50m breaststroke	25.25	CR	Cameron van der Burgh	South Africa	14 November 2009	World Cup	Berlin, Germany	
100m breaststroke	55.61		Cameron van der Burgh	South Africa	15 November 2009	World Cup	Berlin, Germany	
200m breaststroke	2:02.56		Neil Versfeld	South Africa	14 November 2009	World Cup	Berlin, Germany	
50m butterfly	21.87		Roland Schoeman	South Africa	14 November 2009	World Cup	Berlin, Germany	
100m butterfly	48.08	CR	Chad le Clos	South Africa	8 December 2016	World Championships	Windsor, Canada	
200m butterfly	1:48.27		Chad le Clos	South Africa	15 December 2022	World Championships	Melbourne, Australia	
100m individual medley	51.05	CR	Gerhard Zandberg	South Africa	14 November 2009	World Cup	Berlin, Germany	
200m individual medley	1:50.15	CR	Matthew Sates	South Africa	13 December 2022	World Championships	Melbourne, Australia	
400m individual medley	3:57.40		Oussama Mellouli	Tunisia	16 December 2010	World Championships	Dubai, United Arab Emirates	
4×50m freestyle relay	1:24.14		Brad Tandy (21.22); Chad le Clos (20.31); Douglas Erasmus (21.29); Ryan Coetzee (21.32)	South Africa	14 December 2018	World Championships	Hangzhou, China	
4×100m freestyle relay	3:12.87	h	Leith Shankland (48.05); Clayton Jimmie (47.89); Calvyn Justus (48.32); Myles Brown (48.61)	South Africa	3 December 2014	World Championships	Doha, Qatar	
4×200m freestyle relay	6:52.13		Myles Brown (1:43.45); Sebastien Rousseau (1:43.96); Chad le Clos (1:40.61); Leith Shankland (1:44.31)	South Africa	4 December 2014	World Championships	Doha, Qatar	
4×50m medley relay	1:32.56		Mohamed Samy (23.68); Youssef Elkamash (26.32); Youssef Ramadan (22.12); Abdelrahman Sameh (20.44)	Egypt	20 December 2021	World Championships	Abu Dhabi, United Arab Emirates	
4×100m medley relay	3:30.83	h	Mohamed Samy (52.55); Youssef Elkamash (59.71); Youssef Ramadan (50.89); Abdelrahman Sameh (47.68)	Egypt	21 December 2021	World Championships	Abu Dhabi, United Arab Emirates	

Legend: # – Record awaiting ratification by CANA; WR – World record; CR – Commonwealth record; e – equalled existing record;
Records not set in finals: h – heat; sf – semifinal; r – relay 1st leg; rh – relay heat 1st leg; b – B final; † – en route to final mark; so – swim-off; tt – time trial

=== Women ===
Event	Time		Name	Nationality	Date	Meet	Location	Ref
50 m freestyle	24.14	h	Caitlin De Lange	South Africa	14 December 2024	World Championships	Budapest, Hungary	
100 m freestyle	52.70	sf	Erin Gallagher	South Africa	12 December 2018	World Championships	Hangzhou, China	
200 m freestyle	1:54.13		Aimee Canny	South Africa	18 October 2024	Virginia vs Florida Dual Meet	Charlottesville, United States	
400 m freestyle	4:03.50		Melissa Corfe	South Africa	11 April 2008	World Championships	Manchester, Great Britain	
800 m freestyle	8:22.05		Jessica Pengelly	South Africa	4 November 2011	World Cup	Singapore, Singapore	
1500 m freestyle	16:09.12		Stephanie Houtman	South Africa	13 December 2024	World Championships	Budapest, Hungary	
50 m backstroke	26.85	=	Kirsty Coventry	Zimbabwe	13 April 2008	World Championships	Manchester, United Kingdom	
50 m backstroke	26.85	=	Jessica Thompson	South Africa	26 September 2025	South African Championships	Pietermaritzburg, South Africa	
100 m backstroke	56.56		Chanelle Van Wyk	South Africa	15 November 2009	World Cup	Berlin, Germany	
200 m backstroke	2:00.91		Kirsty Coventry	Zimbabwe	11 April 2008	World Championships	Manchester, United Kingdom	
50m breaststroke	29.09		Lara van Niekerk	South Africa	18 December 2022	World Championships	Melbourne, Australia	
100m breaststroke	1:03.89		Tatjana Schoenmaker	South Africa	25 October 2020	South African Championships	Pietermaritzburg, South Africa	
200m breaststroke	2:18.02		Tatjana Schoenmaker	South Africa	26 October 2020	South African Championships	Pietermaritzburg, South Africa	
50m butterfly	25.31		Farida Osman	Egypt	17 November 2019	International Swimming League	College Park, United States	
100m butterfly	56.46		Farida Osman	Egypt	20 December 2019	International Swimming League	Las Vegas, United States	
200m butterfly	2:04.24		Mandy Loots	South Africa	21 November 2009	World Cup	Singapore, Singapore	
100m individual medley	57.69	sf	Rebecca Meder	South Africa	12 December 2024	World Championships	Budapest, Hungary	
200m individual medley	2:05.56		Rebecca Meder	South Africa	12 October 2025	World Cup	Carmel, United States	
400m individual medley	4:22.88		Katheryn Meaklim	South Africa	21 November 2009	World Cup	Singapore, Singapore	
4×50m freestyle relay	1:40.80	h	Caitlin De Lange (24.33); Rebecca Meder (25.14); Emily Visagie (26.08); Milla Drakopoulos (25.25)	South Africa	15 December 2022	World Championships	Melbourne, Australia	
4×100m freestyle relay	3:41.57	h	Milla Drakopoulos (56.97); Caitlin De Lange (53.33); Emily Visagie (57.08); Rebecca Meder (54.19)	South Africa	13 December 2022	World Championships	Melbourne, Australia	
4×200m freestyle relay	8:02.49	h	Karin Prinsloo (1:58.41); Michelle Weber (2:02.84); Kyna Pereira (2:00.99); Jessica Pengelly (2:00.25)	South Africa	12 December 2012	World Championships	Istanbul, Turkey	
4×50m medley relay	1:52.16	h	Erin Gallagher (28.26); Tatjana Schoenmaker (32.06); Trudi Maree (27.04); Lehesta Kemp (24.80)	South Africa	5 December 2014	World Championships	Doha, Qatar	
4×100m medley relay	3:57.68	h	Milla Drakopoulos (59.32); Lara van Niekerk (1:06.13); Rebecca Meder (57.20); Jessica Thompson (55.03)	South Africa	15 December 2024	World Championships	Budapest, Hungary	

Legend: # – Record awaiting ratification by CANA; WR – World record; CR – Commonwealth record; e – equalled existing record;
Records not set in finals: h – heat; sf – semifinal; r – relay 1st leg; rh – relay heat 1st leg; b – B final; † – en route to final mark; so – swim-off; tt – time trial

=== Mixed relay ===
Event	Time		Name	Nationality	Date	Meet	Location	Ref
4×50 m freestyle relay	1:33.19		Luke Pendock (22.01); Clayton Jimmie (21.30); Lehesta Kemp (24.90); Trudi Maree (24.98)	South Africa	6 December 2014	World Championships	Doha, Qatar	
4×50 m medley relay	1:41.32	h	Jessica Thompson (27.16); Michael Houlie (25.67); Caitlin de Lange (26.40); Kris Mihaylov (22.09)	South Africa	11 December 2024	World Championships	Budapest, Hungary	
4×100 m medley relay	3:37.71	h	Ruard van Renen (50.07); Rebecca Meder (1:04.81); Chad le Clos (49.57); Caitlin de Lange (53.26)	South Africa	14 December 2024	World Championships	Budapest, Hungary	

Legend: # – Record awaiting ratification by CANA; WR – World record; e – equalled existing record;
Records not set in finals: h – heat; so – swim-off

== Record holders' rankings ==
=== By nation ===
Nation	Record tally	LC	SC	Total	LC	SC	Total	LC	SC	Total
Nation	Record tally	Men			Women			Mixed		
South Africa	71	17	18	34	14	18	32	2	3	5
Zimbabwe	9				6	2	8			
Tunisia	7	4	3	7						
Egypt	7	1	2	2	1	3	4			
Total	91	20	23	43	20	23	43	2	3	5
