= Swimming at the 2015 African Games – Women's 4×100 metre medley relay =

Women's 4×100 metre medley relay at the 2015 African Games
- Venue: Kintele Aquatic Complex
- Date: September 11, 2015
- Competitors: 16 from 4 nations

Medalists
gold medal	Jessica Ashley Cooper, Tatjana Schoenmaker, Vanessa Mohr, Karin Prinsloo	South Africa
silver medal	Rowan El Badry, Mariam Sakr, Maii Atif, Farida Osman	Egypt
bronze medal	Rim Ouennich, Farah Ben Khelil, Asma Ben Boukhatem, Asma Sammoud	Tunisia

The women's 4×100 metre medley relay event at the 2015 African Games took place on 11 September 2015 at Kintele Aquatic Complex.

== Schedule ==
All times are Congo Standard Time (UTC+01:00)

Date	Time	Event
Friday, 11 September 2015	18:20	Final

== Results ==
=== Final ===
Rank	Team	Time	Notes
1st place, gold medalist(s)	South Africa (RSA)	4:12.36	
	Jessica Ashley Cooper	1:03.26	
	Tatjana Schoenmaker	1:11.07	
	Vanessa Mohr	1:02.10	
	Karin Prinsloo	55.93	
2nd place, silver medalist(s)	Egypt (EGY)	4:15.18	
	Mariam Sakr	1:07.44	
	Maii Atif	1:11.10	
	Farida Osman	59.72	
	Rowan El Badry	56.92	
3rd place, bronze medalist(s)	Tunisia (TUN)	4:29.64	
	Rim Ouennich	1:06.57	
	Farah Ben Khelil	1:16.88	
	Asma Sammoud	1:04.68	
	Asma Ben Boukhatem	1:02.51	
4	Kenya (KEN)	4:43.85	
	Anita Field	1:09.72	
	Natasha Oduor Owino	1:25.31	
	Emily Muteti	1:07.70	
	Rebecca Kamau	1:01.12	
