= 2022 African Swimming Championships =

15th African Swimming Championships
- Host city: Tunis, Tunisia
- Date: 20–24 August
- Nations: 29
- Events: 42

The 15th African Swimming Championships were held from 20 to 24 August 2022 in Tunis, Tunisia.

== Medal table ==
* Host nation (Tunisia)

Rank	Nation	Gold	Silver	Bronze	Total
1	South Africa (RSA)	22	8	10	40
2	Algeria (ALG)	10	11	5	26
3	Egypt (EGY)	7	10	13	30
4	Tunisia (TUN)*	2	6	10	18
5	Ghana (GHA)	1	1	0	2
6	Mauritius (MRI)	0	3	0	3
7	Senegal (SEN)	0	1	2	3
8	Sudan (SUD)	0	1	1	2
9	Uganda (UGA)	0	1	0	1
10	Angola (ANG)	0	0	1	1
Totals (10 entries)		42	42	42	126

== Medal summary ==
=== Men ===
Games	Gold		Silver		Bronze	
50m freestyle	Clayton Jimmie; South Africa	22.47	Oussama Sahnoune; Algeria	22.54	Omar Mehamed Taha Radwan Faker; Egypt	22.62
100m freestyle	Oussama Sahnoune; Algeria	49.44	Clayton Jimmie; South Africa	49.78	Omar Adel OMAR ADEL; Egypt	50.61
200m freestyle	NASR Amin Youssef Abdalla ahmed Egypt	1:52.14	Mohammed Mahdi Laagili; Tunisia	1:52.16	Ahmed Jaouadi; Tunisia	1:52.21
400m freestyle	Ahmed Jaouadi; Tunisia	3:55.14	Marwan El-Amrawy; Egypt	3:55.30	Mohammed Mahdi Laagili; Tunisia	3:59.97
800m freestyle	Marwan El-Amrawy; Egypt	8:06.46	Ahmed Jaouadi; Tunisia	8:10.34	Ben Ajmia Mohamed Khalil; Tunisia	8:18.89
1500m freestyle	Ahmed Jaouadi; Tunisia	15:33.51	Marwan El-Amrawy; Egypt	15:45.80	Ben Ajmia Mohamed Khalil; Tunisia	15:57.57
50m backstroke	Clayton Jimmie; South Africa	25.75	Abdellah Ardjoune; Algeria	25.87	Ruard van Renen; South Africa	26.68
100m backstroke	Abdellah Ardjoune; Algeria	55.31; CR	Salim Zied; Sudan	55.91	Ruard van Renen; South Africa	57.09
200m backstroke	Abdellah Ardjoune; Algeria	2:00.88	Mohamed Hany Elsayed Ahmed Mohamady; Egypt	2:01.68	Salim Zied; Sudan	2:02.06
50m breaststroke	Jaouad Syoud; Algeria	28.00; NR	Adnen Beji; Tunisia	28.02	Mohamed Hossam Ibrahimabdelfatah Eissawy; Egypt	28.14
100m breaststroke	Jaouad Syoud; Algeria	1:01.18; CR, NR	Adnen Beji; Tunisia	1:01.49	Mohamed Hossam Ibrahimabdelfatah Eissawy; Egypt	1:02.66
200m breaststroke	Jaouad Syoud; Algeria	2:13.37; CR	Matthew Randle; South Africa	2:15.43	Adnen Beji; Tunisia	2:16.94
50m butterfly	Clayton Jimmie; South Africa	23.54	Abeiku Jackson; Ghana	24.08	Omar Mehamed Taha Radwan Faker; Egypt	24.27
100m butterfly	Abeiku Jackson; Ghana	53.89	Jaouad Syoud; Algeria	53.94	Clayton Jimmie; South Africa	54.22
200m butterfly	Jaouad Syoud; Algeria	1:58.98; CR	Ross Hartigan; South Africa	2:01.23	NASR AMIN YOUSSEF ABDALLA AHMED; Egypt	2:02.71
200m individual medley	Jaouad Syoud; Algeria	2:00.05; CR	Ross Hartigan; South Africa	2:03.87	Moncef Balamane; Algeria	2:04.26
400m individual medley	Jaouad Syoud; Algeria	4:22.08	Karim Magdi Mahmoud Ismail Mahmoud; Egypt	4:28.54	Ruan Ras; South Africa	4:29.06
4×100m freestyle relay	Egypt	3:24.76	Algeria; Aimene Moncef Balamane, Sofiane Achour Talet, Oussama Sahnoune, Jaouad Syoud	3:26.51	Senegal	3:27.92
4×200m freestyle relay	Egypt	7:32.49	Tunisia	7:34.40	South Africa	7:42.93
4×100m medley relay	Algeria; Abdellah Ardjoune, Aimene Moncef Balamane, Jaouad Syoud, Oussama Sahnoune	3:42.05	Egypt	3:45.14	South Africa	3:45.26

=== Women ===
Games	Gold		Silver		Bronze	
50m freestyle	Inge Weidemann; South Africa	25.75	Kirabo Namutebi; Uganda	26.01 NR	Nesrine Medjahed; Algeria	26.12
100m freestyle	Inge Weidemann; South Africa	57.20	Nesrine Medjahed; Algeria	57.26	Trinity Hearne; South Africa	57.65
200m freestyle	Lojine Abdallah Salah Zaki Hamed; Egypt	2:05.53	Trinity Hearne; South Africa	2:05.65	Hannah Pearse; South Africa	2:07.92
400m freestyle	Lojine Abdallah Salah Zaki Hamed; Egypt	4:25.50	Maram Souissi; Tunisia	4:29.84	Samantha Randle; South Africa	4:30.07
800m freestyle	Lojine Abdallah Salah Zaki Hamed; Egypt	9:05.26	Samantha Randle; South Africa	9:08.56	Jamila Boulakbeche; Tunisia	9:13.66
1500m freestyle	Samantha Randle; South Africa	17:28.54	Lojine Abdallah Salah Zaki Hamed; Egypt	17:30.73	Jamila Boulakbeche; Tunisia	17:43.53
50m backstroke	Kerryn Herbst; South Africa	29.53	Meroua Merniz; Algeria	29.79	Sara Walid Mahmoud Elsammany; Egypt	30.09
100m backstroke	Kerryn Herbst; South Africa	1:03.34	Anishta Teeluck; Mauritius	1:04.59	Meroua Merniz; Algeria	1:04.65
200m backstroke	Hannah Pearse; South Africa	2:16.19	Anishta Teeluck; Mauritius	2:19.01	Samantha Randle; South Africa	2:19.18
50m breaststroke	Emily Visagie; South Africa	33.22	Alicia Kok Shun; Mauritius	33.31	Hedy Moustafa Mahmoud Aly; Egypt	33.50
100m breaststroke	Emily Visagie; South Africa	1:11.49	Hamida Rania Nefsi; Algeria	1:12.55	Habiba Belghith; Tunisia	1:13.17
200m breaststroke	Emily Visagie; South Africa	2:34.33	Hamida Rania Nefsi; Algeria	2:38.70	Rawan Tamer Mohamed Said Mohamed Eldama; Egypt	2:39.50
50m butterfly	Inge Weidemann; South Africa	27.28	Sara Walid Mahmoud Elsammany; Egypt	27.63	Oumy Diop; Senegal	27.86
100m butterfly	Trinity Hearne; South Africa	1:01.08	Oumy Diop; Senegal	1:01.24	Rawan Tamer Mohamed Said Mohamed Eldama; Egypt	1:02.48
200m butterfly	Trinity Hearne; South Africa	2:20.88	Hiaa Khaled Ibrahim Abdemeged Salim Diab; Egypt	2:20.95	Lia-Ana Lima; Angola	2:23.57
200m individual medley	Emily Visagie; South Africa	2:19.69	Trinity Hearne; South Africa	2:19.85	Imene Kawthar Zitouni; Algeria	2:26.28
400m individual medley	Trinity Hearne; South Africa	4:56.89	Samantha Randle; South Africa	4:58.57	Rawan Tamer Mohamed Said Mohamed Eldama; Egypt	5:02.69
4×100m freestyle relay	South Africa	3:52.52	Egypt	3:54.73	Tunisia	4:03.49
4×200m freestyle relay	South Africa	8:36.51	Egypt	8:38.79	Algeria; Nesrine Medjahed, Hamida Rania Nefsi, Meroua Merniz, Imene Kawthar Zitouni	8:47.39
4×100m medley relay	South Africa	4:15.51	Algeria; Meroua Merniz, Hamida Rania Nefsi, Imene Kawthar Zitouni, Nesrine Medjahed	4:20.75	Tunisia	4:24.41

=== Mixed ===
Games	Gold		Silver		Bronze	
4×100m freestyle relay	South Africa	3:37.30	Algeria; Oussama Sahnoune, Imene Kawthar Zitouni, Nesrine Medjahed, Jaouad Syoud	3:38.98	Egypt	3.39.41
4×100m medley relay	South Africa	4:00.15	Algeria; Abdellah Ardjoune, Hamida Rania Nefsi, Jaouad Syoud, Nesrine Medjahed	4:00.40	Egypt	4:03.47

== Participating countries ==
- Algeria
- Angola
- Benin
- Botswana
- Burkina Faso
- Burundi
- Cape Verde
- Egypt
- Eswatini
- Gambia
- Ghana
- Guinea
- Madagascar
- Malawi
- Mali
- Mauritius
- Morocco
- Mozambique
- Namibia
- Niger
- Nigeria
- Senegal
- Seychelles
- South Africa
- Sudan
- Tanzania
- Tunisia
- Uganda
- Zimbabwe
