= Samiha Mohsen =

Egyptian champion swimmer

Personal information
- Nickname: Sammy
- Born: October 28, 1998 (age 27)

Sport
- Sport: Swimming
- College team: University of Calgary
Medal record
Representing Egypt
African Swimming Championships
| Gold medal – first place | 2018 Algiers | 100m backstroke |
| Gold medal – first place | 2021 Accra | 50 m backstroke |
| Silver medal – second place | 2018 Algiers | 50m backstroke |
| Silver medal – second place | 2018 Algiers | 4x100m freestyle relay |
| Silver medal – second place | 2018 Algiers | 4x100m medley relay |
| Silver medal – second place | 2021 Accra | 100 m backstroke |
| Bronze medal – third place | 2021 Accra | 200 m backstroke |

Samiha Tarek Ahmed Mohsen (born October 28, 1998) is an Egyptian swimmer.

== Career ==
At the 2018 African Swimming Championships in Algiers, Algeria, Samiha won the following medals:

Gold
| Games | Time |
|---|---|
| 100m backstroke | 1:04.19 |
| 4 × 100 m freestyle relay | 1:00.37 |
| 4 × 100 m medley relay | 1:04.65 |

Silver
| Games | Time |
|---|---|
| 50m backstroke | 29.51 NR |
| 4 × 100 m freestyle relay | 58.65 |
| 4 × 100 m medley relay | 1:04.39 |

== Personal life ==
Born in Egypt, Samiha moved to the United States in 2015 to complete a bachelor's degree in biology pre-medicine, interning at the Mayo Clinic upon graduation. She then completed her master's degree in epidemiology at the University of Calgary, Canada, where she was part of the university's varsity swim team. She then moved to Toronto to completer her Doctor of Medicine studies at the Temerty Faculty of Medicine. She notably participated as a junior olympian at the 2014 summer youth olympics in Nanjing, China.
