= Farida Osman =

Egyptian swimmer (born 1995)

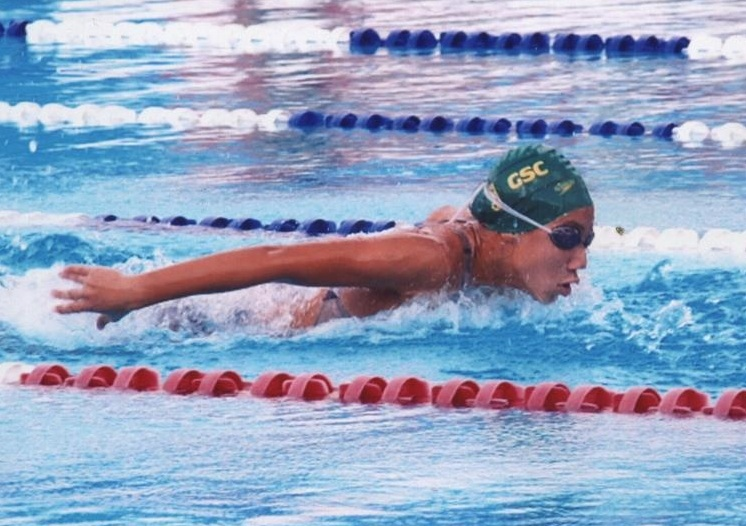
- Osman in 2008

Personal information
- Full name: Farida Hisham Osman
- National team: Egypt
- Born: 18 January 1995 (age 31) Indianapolis, Indiana, United States
- Height: 1.65 m (5 ft 5 in)
- Weight: 70 kg (154 lb)

Sport
- Sport: Swimming
- Strokes: Butterfly, freestyle
- Club: Gezira Sporting Club
- College team: University of California, Berkeley
Medal record
Women's swimming
Representing Egypt
World Championships (LC)
Bronze medal – third place	2017 Budapest	50 m butterfly
Bronze medal – third place	2019 Gwangju	50 m butterfly
Bronze medal – third place	2024 Doha	50 m butterfly
All-Africa Games
Gold medal – first place	2011 Maputo	50m butterfly
Gold medal – first place	2015 Brazzaville	50 m freestyle
Gold medal – first place	2015 Brazzaville	100 m freestyle
Gold medal – first place	2015 Brazzaville	50 m butterfly
Gold medal – first place	2015 Brazzaville	100 m butterfly
Gold medal – first place	2015 Brazzaville	4×100 m mixed medley
Silver medal – second place	2015 Brazzaville	4×100 m freestyle
Silver medal – second place	2015 Brazzaville	4×100 m medley
Silver medal – second place	2015 Brazzaville	4×100 m mixed freestyle
Mediterranean Games
Gold medal – first place	2013 Mersin	50 m butterfly
Gold medal – first place	2018 Tarragona	50 m freestyle
Gold medal – first place	2018 Tarragona	50 m butterfly
Bronze medal – third place	2026 Taranto	50 m butterfly
World Junior Championships
Gold medal – first place	2011 Lima	50 m butterfly
African Championships
Gold medal – first place	2010 Casablanca	50m fly
Silver medal – second place	2010 Casablanca	50m free
Silver medal – second place	2010 Casablanca	4x100m free relay
Bronze medal – third place	2010 Casablanca	100m fly
Bronze medal – third place	2010 Casablanca	50m back
Bronze medal – third place	2010 Casablanca	4x100m medley relay
Junior African Championship
Gold medal – first place	2009 Mauritius	50m fly
Gold medal – first place	2009 Mauritius	50m Free
Gold medal – first place	2009 Mauritius	50m Back
Silver medal – second place	2009 Mauritius	100m Fly
Silver medal – second place	2009 Mauritius	4x100m Free Relay
Silver medal – second place	2009 Mauritius	4x100m Medley Relay
Silver medal – second place	2009 Mauritius	4x200m Free Relay
Bronze medal – third place	2009 Mauritius	100m Free
Bronze medal – third place	2009 Mauritius	100m Back

Farida Hisham Osman (Arabic: فريدة هشام عثمان; born 18 January 1995) is an Egyptian-American competitive swimmer who specializes in butterfly and freestyle events. She is an All-Africa Games gold medalist and Egyptian national champion and record-holder. Osman is the fastest female swimmer in Egypt and Africa, she is currently coached by Teri McKeever. Osman holds the senior national records for all the butterfly, freestyle and backstroke events, as well as African records in the 50m and 100m butterfly.

== Early life ==
Daughter to dentists Hisham Osman and Randa Elsalawy, Osman was born in Indianapolis, Indiana in 1995, and raised in Cairo, Egypt. She started swimming at the age of five at the Gezira Sporting Club with her brother Ahmed. Osman started at the Oasis French School in Cairo but then transitioned to the French Embassy's Lycée Français du Caire. She studied at the Cairo American College.

== Career ==
Osman took a break from swimming to pursue her synchronized swimming passion. At the age of 11, she returned to swimming and won all the 50m and 100m freestyle and butterfly national titles, earning the "Best Swimmer" trophy. At the age of 12, she was selected to represent Egypt at the 11th Pan Arab Games in Cairo, Egypt. She was the youngest athlete on the team and participated in the 50m, 100m freestyle, and the 50m and 100m butterfly. Osman broke the Arab record for the 50m butterfly, where she became the youngest Egyptian and Arab athlete ever to win the event and break the record. She finished 6th in the 100m butterfly.

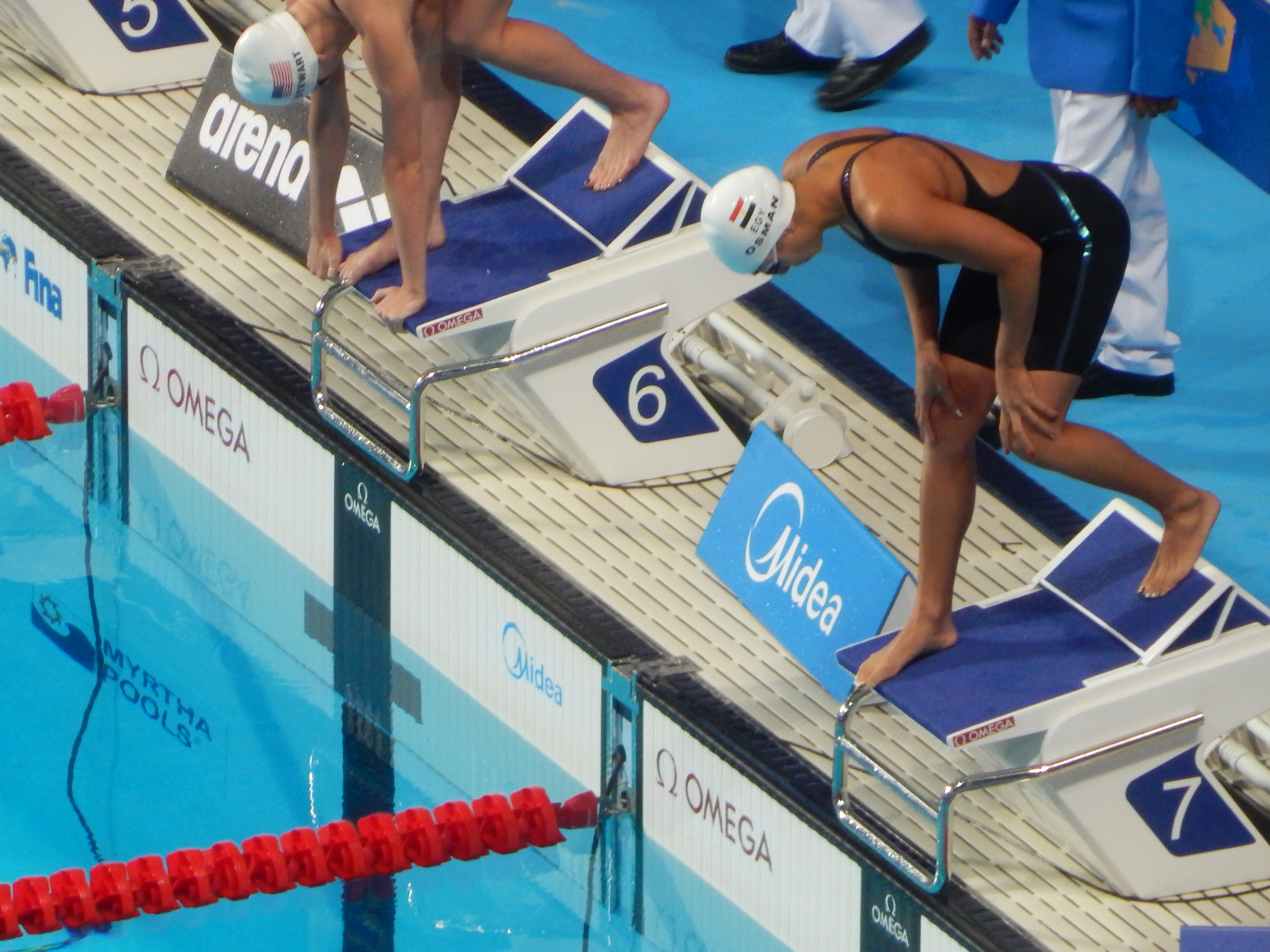
Kazan 2015

The same year she competed at the All Africa Games and finished fifth in the 50m butterfly with a time of 28.95.

Osman continued her career by participating in various international competitions, such as the International Sindlefingen Swimming Competition (ISSC), where she competed in all sprint events in backstroke, butterfly, and freestyle. She received the 2nd-place trophy for best sprinters in the competition.

At 13, Osman traveled to the United States for a summer camp, where she swam for the Bear Swimming Team in Berkeley, California. She participated in various competitions such as RESLs, Junior Olympics, Sectionals, and Far Westerns where she was in the top 10 places of her year group.

== Major achievements ==
=== 3rd FINA Junior World Championship, Lima, Peru ===
At the 3rd FINA FINA World Junior Swimming Championships, held in Lima, Peru, Osman was one of the biggest surprised at the competition. In a world junior championship record time of 26.69, she became the world junior champion in the 50m butterfly, placing Egypt 11th on the medalists charts, the highest rank any African or Arab nation has reached in a long time. In the 100m butterfly, Osman placed 15th with a time of 1:02.18.

=== 13th FINA World Championship, Rome, Italy ===
At the 13th FINA 2009 World Aquatic Championships, held in Roma, Italy, Osman was among the youngest swimmers at the competition. She placed 66th in the 50m Freestyle, clocking 26.77. She also placed 50th in the 50m Butterfly with a time of 27.78, making her the fastest swimmer in the world for her age group. Moreover, she placed 87th in the 100m free (59.45) and 64th in the 100m butterfly (1.03.21).

=== 8th Junior African Championship, Mauritius ===
Shortly after the world championships, Osman went to Mauritius to represent Egypt at the 8th Junior African Championship. She placed 1st in the 50m freestyle, setting a new Junior African record with a time of 26.36. Similarly, in the 50m Butterfly, her strongest event, she broke another Junior African record with a time of 27.60. Dominating in the sprinting events, Osman also won the gold medal in the 50m backstroke with a record time of 31.04. In her remaining events, Osman won the silver medal in the 100m butterfly with a time of 1:03.16, finishing second to South Africa's Vanessa Mohr. In both the 100m freestyle and 100m backstroke, Osman finished 3rd place.

=== 2012 Summer Olympics ===
At the 2012 Summer Olympics in London, United Kingdom, Osman represented Egypt in the 50m freestyle event beside her teammate Shehab Younis. Osman finished 42nd with a time of 26.34.

=== 2013 World Aquatics Championships ===
Osman competed in four events at the 2013 World Aquatics Championships in Barcelona, Spain. On the first day, Osman competed in the 100m butterfly, finishing 24th with a time of 59.85s. On the fifth day of competition, she swam the 100m freestyle while finishing 40th with a 56.84s. On the sixth day of competition, Osman finished 11th in the heats of her signature event, 50m butterfly, while advancing to the semi-finals and finishing with a new African Record of 26.12s. Osman is the first Egyptian to qualify for a final at the World Aquatics Championships in Egyptian history. On 3 August 2013, Osman finished 7th in the women's 50m butterfly final with a time of 26.17s respectively for Egypt. This is the best ranking ever by an Egyptian pool swimmer in a major international competition.

=== 2017 FINA World Championships ===
At the 2017 FINA World Championships, Osman competed for Egypt and won the bronze model in the 50m butterfly event with the new African record of 25.39s. In the 50m freestyle event, she also set a new African record at 24.62s, which gave her the 9th place.

=== 2017 NCAA Swimming Championships ===
At the 2017 NCAA championships, Osman won first place in 100 Yard butterfly. She also won first place in the 200 Yard freestyle relay and the 200 Yard medley relay, which she anchored both. She won third place in the 400 Yard freestyle relay.

=== 2018 Mediterranean Games ===
At the 2018 Mediterranean Games in Tarragona, Spain, Osman competed for Egypt in four events and won three medals, two gold and one silver. In the 50m freestyle, Osman won the gold medal with the new Mediterranean Game record of 24.83s. Osman won the gold medal in the 50m butterfly, with the new Mediterranean Game record of 25.48s. In the 100m butterfly, Osman won the silver medal with a time of 58.51s. In the 100m freestyle, Osman qualified but did not compete in the finals. She was the fourth most successful individual athlete at the Games.

== Personal bests ==
Long course
Event	Time	Meet Name	Meet City	Meet Country	Date	Note(s)
50m freestyle	24.62	2017 FINA World Championships	Budapest	Hungary	29 July 2017	NR, AF
100m freestyle	54.93	2019 FINA World Championships	Gwangju	South Korea	25 July 2019	NR
50m butterfly	25.38	2022 FINA World Championships	Budapest	Hungary	24 June 2022	NR,AF
100m butterfly	57.66	2022 FINA World Championships	Budapest	Hungary	19 June 2022	NR
50m backstroke	30.25	Arab Games	Doha	Qatar	19 December 2011	NR

== Awards and honours ==
She was named the Best Female Athlete from Africa by the Association Of National Olympic Committees (ANOC) in 2017.

She was awarded the Mohamed Bin Rashed Al Maktoum Creative Sport Award for Distinguished Athlete Achievement in Sport in 2017.

She won the African Female Swimmer of the Year title in Swimswam.com's Swammy Awards in 2013, 2015, 2016 and 2017.

She was selected as the 2017 Female African Swimmer of the Year by the Swimming World magazine.

She was the recipient of the Tom Hansen Medal as the top female athlete for the 2016/17 season at the University of California Berkeley.

She was recognized as one of the BBC's 100 women of 2019.

== See also ==
- Muslim women in sport
