= Oumy Diop =

French-Senegalese swimmer (born 2003)

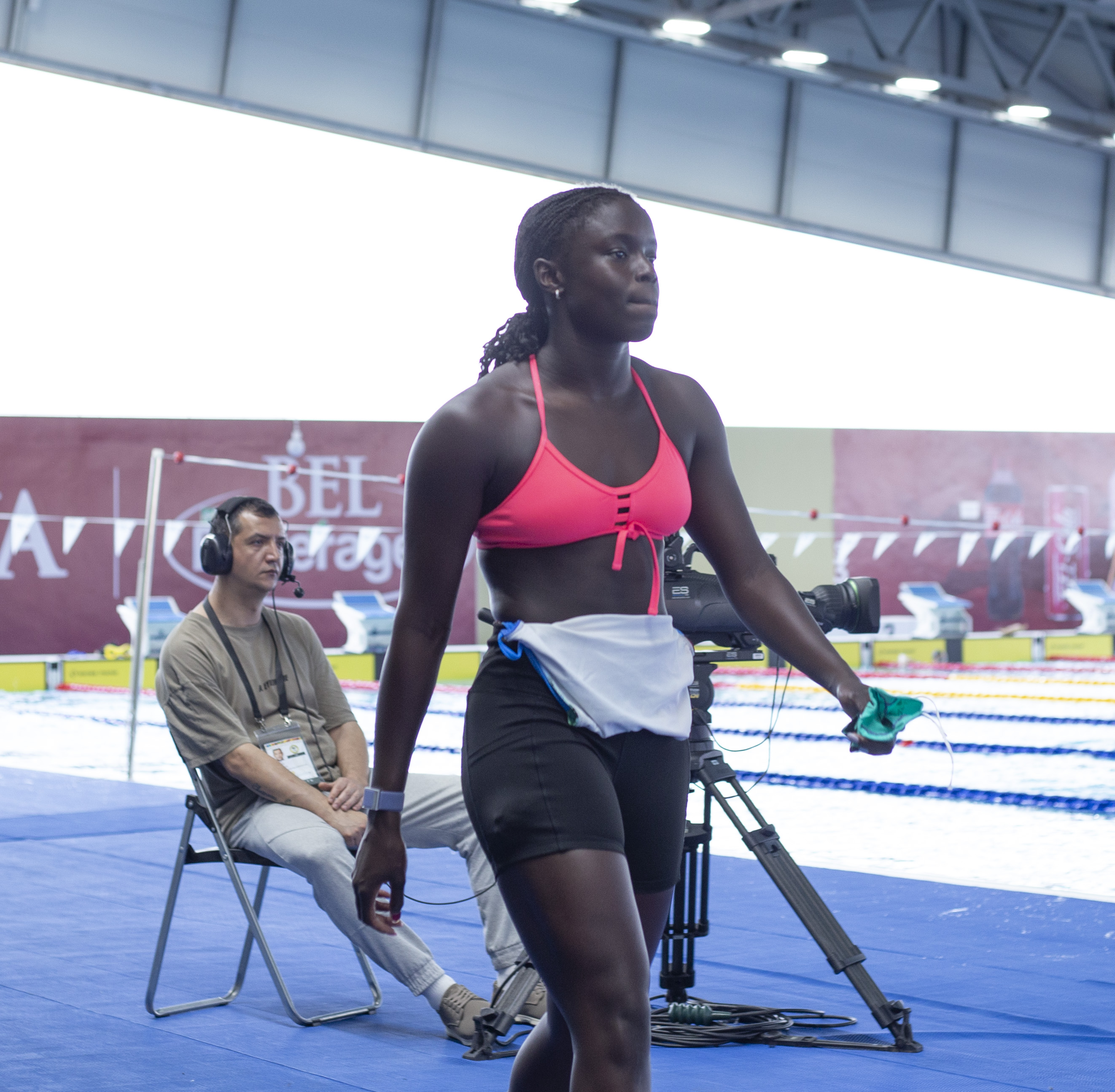
- Diop in 2023

Personal information
- Nationality: France and Senegal
- Born: 29 August 2003 (age 23) Grenoble, France
- Height: 169 cm (5 ft 7 in)

Sport
- Sport: Swimming
- Strokes: butterfly, backstroke and freestyle events
- College team: Florida International University

Oumy Diop (born 29 August 2003) is a French-Senegalese swimmer who specialises in butterfly, backstroke and freestyle events. She represents Senegal in international competitions and holds five medals from the African Swimming Championships.

== Early life ==
Diop was born to Senegalese parents in Grenoble, France. She began competing in swimming events aged 5. Diop studied at Florida International University in the United States.

== Career ==
In August 2022, Diop won silver in the 100m butterfly and bronze in the 50m butterfly at the 2022 African Swimming Championships in Tunis, Tunisia. Also in 2022, Diop came in 4th place in the 100m butterfly at the Islamic Solidarity Games and competed at the African Zone 2 Championships in Dakar. She qualified for the 2022 FINA Short Course World Championships in Melbourne, Australia.

In February 2024, Diop competed at the 2024 World Aquatics Championships in Qatar. In April 2024, Diop won gold in the 100m butterfly, silver in the 50m butterfly, and two bronze medals in the 100m freestyle and 500m backstroke and broke Senegalese swimming records at the 2024 African Swimming Championships in Luanda, Angola. She represented Senegal in the 100m butterfly at the 2024 Summer Olympics in Paris, France, but was eliminated in the heats.

At the 2025 World Aquatics Championships in Kallang, Singapore, Diop competed in the 50m butterfly and the 50m backstroke events. She also competed in the swimming tournament at the 2025 Islamic Solidarity Games in Riyadh, Saudi Arabia, winning bronze in the 50m butterfly.

Diop is an ambassador for the 2026 Youth Olympic Games.
