= Shehab Younis =

Egyptian swimmer

Personal information
- Born: March 30, 1988 (age 38) Alexandria, Egypt

Sport
- Sport: Swimming

Shehab Younis (born 30 March 1988) is an Egyptian swimmer specializing in freestyle. He competed in the 50 m event at the 2012 Summer Olympics.
