= Emily Visagie =

South African swimmer (born 1998)

Personal information
- Born: January 8, 1998 (age 28)

Sport
- Sport: Swimming
- Strokes: Breaststroke
Medal record
Women's swimming
Representing South Africa
African Championships
Gold medal – first place	2022 Tunis	50 m breaststroke
Gold medal – first place	2022 Tunis	100 m breaststroke
Gold medal – first place	2022 Tunis	200 m breaststroke
Gold medal – first place	2022 Tunis	100 m individual medley

Emily Visagie (born 8 January 1998) is a South African swimmer. She competed at the 2014 FINA World Swimming Championships, in the 50, 100, and 200m breaststroke events. In 2015, she participated in the FINA World Junior Swimming Championships. She competed at the 2018 Commonwealth Games, reaching the semifinal in the 100m breaststroke and the finals in the 200m breaststroke, finishing in 7th. She also competed at the 2018 FINA World Swimming Championships.
