= 2026 African Swimming Championships =

International swimming competition

- Host city: Oran, Algeria
- Date: 5–10 May
- Venue: Miloud Hadefi Complex Aquatic Center
- Nations: 41
- Athletes: 450
- Website: africaaquatics.org

The 2026 African Swimming Championships (Arabic: البطولة الإفريقية للسباحة 2026) is the 17th edition of the African Swimming Championships (senior and junior), it is held from 5 to 10 May 2026 in Bir El Djir, Oran, Algeria. This edition is also the 1st African Inter Zonal Swimming Championships and the 2nd African Masters Swimming Championships. Nearly 450 swimmers representing 41 countries are participating to this edition.

== Medal table (Senior) ==
* Host nation (Algeria)

| Rank | Nation | Gold | Silver | Bronze | Total |
|---|---|---|---|---|---|
| 1 | Egypt (EGY) | 11 | 6 | 6 | 23 |
| 2 | Algeria (ALG)* | 10 | 8 | 9 | 27 |
| 3 | South Africa (RSA) | 9 | 13 | 10 | 32 |
| 4 | Tunisia (TUN) | 3 | 0 | 2 | 5 |
| 5 | Zimbabwe (ZIM) | 2 | 4 | 3 | 9 |
| 6 | Uganda (UGA) | 2 | 1 | 1 | 4 |
| Totals (6 entries) | | 37 | 32 | 31 | 100 |

== Medal table (Junior) ==
* Host nation (Algeria)

| Rank | Nation | Gold | Silver | Bronze | Total |
|---|---|---|---|---|---|
| 1 | South Africa (RSA) | 25 | 15 | 12 | 52 |
| 2 | Egypt (EGY) | 15 | 14 | 10 | 39 |
| 3 | Algeria (ALG)* | 1 | 4 | 11 | 16 |
| 4 | Zimbabwe (ZIM) | 1 | 2 | 0 | 3 |
| 5 | Namibia (NAM) | 0 | 2 | 5 | 7 |
| 6 | Tunisia (TUN) | 0 | 2 | 1 | 3 |
| Totals (6 entries) | | 42 | 39 | 39 | 120 |
