= Marwan El-Amrawy =

Egyptian swimmer (born 1995)

Personal information
- Born: April 14, 1995 (age 31) Alexandria, Egypt

Sport
- Sport: Swimming
Medal record
Men's swimming
Representing Egypt
African Games
Gold medal – first place	2019 Rabat	4x200 m freestyle relay
Bronze medal – third place	2019 Rabat	1500 m freestyle
African Championships
Gold medal – first place	2022 Tunis	800 m freestyle
Gold medal – first place	2024 Luanda	4x200 m freestyle relay
Silver medal – second place	2022 Tunis	400 m freestyle
Silver medal – second place	2022 Tunis	1500 m freestyle
Silver medal – second place	2024 Luanda	800 m freestyle
Silver medal – second place	2024 Luanda	1500 m freestyle
Bronze medal – third place	2024 Luanda	400 m freestyle

Marwan El-Amrawy (born April 14, 1995) is an Egyptian marathon swimmer. He placed 23rd in the men's marathon 10 kilometre event at the 2016 Summer Olympics after placing 1st in Africa. In 2019, he represented Egypt at the 2019 African Games held in Rabat, Morocco.
