= Youssef El-Kamash =

Egyptian swimmer (born 1995)

Personal information
- Born: 20 July 1995 (age 30)

Sport
- Sport: Swimming
Medal record
Representing Egypt
African Games
Silver medal – second place	2015 Brazzaville	50m breaststroke
Silver medal – second place	2015 Brazzaville	100m breaststroke
Silver medal – second place	2019 Rabat	50m breaststroke
Silver medal – second place	2019 Rabat	100m breaststroke
Silver medal – second place	2019 Rabat	200m breaststroke
Silver medal – second place	2023 Accra	50m breaststroke
Silver medal – second place	2023 Accra	4x100m medley relay
African Championships
Gold medal – first place	2021 Accra	50 m breaststroke
Gold medal – first place	2021 Accra	100 m breaststroke
Bronze medal – third place	2021 Accra	200 m breaststroke
Bronze medal – third place	2024 Luanda	4×100 m mixed medley relay

Youssef El-Kamash (born 20 July 1995) is an Egyptian swimmer. He competed in the men's 50 metre breaststroke event at the 2017 World Aquatics Championships. In 2019, he represented Egypt at the 2019 African Games held in Rabat, Morocco.
