= Ayrton Sweeney =

South African swimmer (born 1993)

Personal information
- Born: 11 May 1993 (age 33) Cape Town
- Height: 183 cm (6 ft 0 in)
- Weight: 69 kg (152 lb)

Sport
- Country: South Africa
- Sport: Artistic swimming, pool swimming (former)
- Events: Solo technical routine, Solo free routine, Mixed duet technical routine, Mixed duet free

Ayrton Sweeney (born 11 May 1993) is a South African pool swimmer and artistic swimmer. He competed in the men's 200 metre individual medley event at the 2017 World Aquatics Championships. In 2019, he represented South Africa at the 2019 African Games held in Rabat, Morocco.

At the 2022 World Aquatics Championships, he and his partner Laura Strugnell competed at FINA World Aquatics Championships, placing 13th in the preliminary round of the mixed duet free routine.
