= Mohamed Samy =

Egyptian swimmer (born 1997)

Personal information
- Born: 17 March 1997 (age 29) Cairo, Egypt

Sport
- Sport: Swimming
- College team: Indiana University Bloomington
Medal record
Representing Egypt
African Games
Gold medal – first place	2015 Brazzaville	4x100m medley relay
Silver medal – second place	2015 Brazzaville	100m freestyle
Silver medal – second place	2015 Brazzaville	4x100m freestyle relay
Silver medal – second place	2015 Brazzaville	4x200m freestyle relay
Silver medal – second place	2019 Rabat	4x100m freestyle relay
Silver medal – second place	2019 Rabat	4x100m medley relay
Bronze medal – third place	2019 Rabat	100m freestyle
African Championships
Gold medal – first place	2021 Accra	100 m freestyle
Gold medal – first place	2021 Accra	50 m backstroke
Gold medal – first place	2021 Accra	100 m backstroke
Gold medal – first place	2021 Accra	4x200m freestyle relay
Gold medal – first place	2021 Accra	4x100m mixed freestyle relay
Silver medal – second place	2021 Accra	200 m individual medley

Mohamed Samy (born 17 March 1997) is an Egyptian swimmer. He competed in the men's 100 metre freestyle event at the 2017 World Aquatics Championships. In 2019, he represented Egypt at the 2019 African Games held in Rabat, Morocco.
