= Marwan Elkamash =

Egyptian swimmer (born 1993)

Personal information
- Native name: مروان محمد اسماعيل محمد على القماش
- Full name: Marwan Mohamed Ismail Mohamed Aly El-Kamash
- Nickname: Marweezy
- Nationality: Egyptian
- Born: Marwan Elkamash; 14 November 1993 (age 32) Alexandria, Egypt
- Height: 184 cm (6 ft 0 in)

Sport
- Country: Egypt
- Sport: Swimming
- Events: 200, 400, 800 and 1500
- College team: Indiana University
- Club: Energy standard, Indiana swim club and The swim team club
- Turned pro: 2017
- Retired: 2024
- Now coaching: Private

Achievements and titles
- World finals: Melbourne 2022
- National finals: 124
- Highest world ranking: 7th Melbourne 2022
- Personal bests: MARWAN ELKAMASH: PERSONAL BESTS LONG COURSE (50 m) 50 free: 24.99 (Rio Olympics, 2016) 100 free: 50.63 (Charlotte, 2015) 200 free: 1:47.40 (World Championships, Budapest, 2017) 400 free: 3:46.36 (World Championships, Budapest, 2017) 800 free: 7:46.55 (World Championships, Fukuoka, 2023) 1500 free: 14:55.19 (World Championships, Fukuoka, 2023) 50 fly: 27.63 (African Championships, 2018) 100 fly: 54.55 (Egyptian National Championships, 2016) 200 fly: 2:00.96 (African Championships, 2018) SHORT COURSE (25 m) 50 free: 24.56 (Short Course World Championships, 2018) 100 free: 51.52 (Short Course World Championships, 2018) 200 free: 1:46.11 (Short Course World Championships, 2021; World Cup, 2022) 400 free: 3:40.94 (World Cup, Berlin, 2022) 800 free: 7:36.01 (Short Course World Championships, Melbourne, 2022) 1500 free: 14:35.93 (World Cup, Berlin, 2022)
Medal record
Representing Egypt
FINA Swimming World Cup
Gold medal – first place	2022 Toronto	800 m freestyle
Mediterranean Games
Bronze medal – third place	2018 Tarragona	200m freestyle
Bronze medal – third place	2018 Tarragona	400m freestyle
African Games
Gold medal – first place	2019 Rabat	200m freestyle
Gold medal – first place	2019 Rabat	4x200m freestyle relay
Gold medal – first place	2023 Accra	200 m freestyle
Gold medal – first place	2023 Accra	400 m freestyle
Gold medal – first place	2023 Accra	800 m freestyle
Gold medal – first place	2023 Accra	1500 m freestyle
Gold medal – first place	2023 Accra	4x200m freestyle relay
Silver medal – second place	2015 Brazzaville	200m freestyle
Silver medal – second place	2015 Brazzaville	4x100m freestyle relay
Silver medal – second place	2015 Brazzaville	4x200m freestyle relay
Silver medal – second place	2019 Rabat	400m freestyle
Silver medal – second place	2019 Rabat	4x100m freestyle relay
Silver medal – second place	2023 Accra	4x100m freestyle relay
Silver medal – second place	2023 Accra	4x100m medley relay
Bronze medal – third place	2019 Rabat	800m freestyle
African Championships
Gold medal – first place	2021 Accra	200 m freestyle
Gold medal – first place	2021 Accra	400 m freestyle
Gold medal – first place	2021 Accra	800 m freestyle
Gold medal – first place	2021 Accra	1500 m freestyle
Gold medal – first place	2021 Accra	4x200m freestyle relay

Marwan Aly Elkamash (Arabic: مروان محمد اسماعيل محمد على القماش; born 14 November 1993) is an Egyptian swimmer who competed at three consecutive Olympic Games and six editions of the World Aquatics Championships.

== Early life ==
Elkamash was born in Alexandria, Egypt, and began swimming at the age of four at Sporting Club in Alexandria. His younger brothers have also represented Egypt in swimming.

== College career ==
Elkamash swam collegiately at the University of South Carolina, where he earned All-America honors three times in the 800-yard freestyle relay, before transferring to Indiana University for the 2016–17 season. He earned two further All-America honors at the 2017 NCAA Championships, including a seventh-place finish in the 500-yard freestyle. His school record of 4:10.87 in the event, set in 2017, stood until the 2025 NCAA Championships.

== International career ==
=== Olympic Games ===
Elkamash made his Olympic debut at the 2016 Summer Olympics in Rio de Janeiro. At the 2020 Summer Olympics in Tokyo, he was entered in the 400 m, 800 m and 1500 m freestyle.

He was the only Egyptian swimmer to achieve "A-cut" qualifying times for the 2024 Summer Olympics in Paris, having trained in southern California with coach Mark Schubert. He dislocated his shoulder during the 800 m freestyle in Paris but completed the race, placing 27th in 8:07.00. He then withdrew from the 1500 m freestyle and had shoulder surgery.

=== World Championships ===
Elkamash competed at the World Aquatics Championships in 2013, 2015, 2017, 2019, 2022 and 2023. In 2017, he placed ninth in the heats of the 400 m freestyle, missing the final by 0.22 seconds. In 2023, he placed tenth in the 800 m freestyle in a national record of 7:46.55 and ninth in the 1500 m freestyle.

He also competed at the 2018, 2021 and 2022 editions of the World Swimming Championships (25 m), placing seventh in the 800 m freestyle in 2022.

=== Other competitions ===
In October 2022, he became the first Egyptian swimmer to win a gold medal at the FINA Swimming World Cup, winning the 800 m freestyle in Toronto in 7:45.09.

In 2019, he represented Egypt at the African Games in Rabat, Morocco. At the 2023 African Games in Accra, held in March 2024, he won five gold and two silver medals, tying with South Africa's Caitlin De Lange as the most decorated athlete of the Games. He was subsequently named Best African Athlete.

== Personal bests ==
Event	Long course (50 m)	Short course (25 m)
200 m freestyle	1:47.40	1:46.11
400 m freestyle	3:46.36	3:40.84
800 m freestyle	7:46.55	7:36.01
1500 m freestyle	14:55.19	14:35.93

Source: World Aquatics. |- ! colspan="3" style="text-align:center;vertical-align:middle;background-color:#cccccc;color:inherit;" | FINA Swimming World Cup |- | style="text-align:center;vertical-align:middle;color:inherit;" | || style="text-align:center;vertical-align:middle;" | 2022 Toronto|| style="text-align:center;vertical-align:middle;" | 800 m freestyle
