= African Swimming Championships =

Swimming competition

- Status: active
- Genre: sporting event
- Date: mid-year
- Frequency: biennial
- Inaugurated: 1974
- Previous event: 2026 African Swimming Championships

African Swimming Championships are the African championships in the sport of swimming. It is organised by the African Swimming Confederation (CANA) and held biennially.

The most recent edition of the Championships was held in August 2022 in Tunis.

== Championships ==
Number	Year	Host city	Host country	Dates	Nations	Swimmers	Events	1st Medal Table	2nd Medal Table	3rd Medal Table
1	1974	Cairo	Egypt	29 September–3 October	7	71	19	Tunisia	Egypt	Morocco
2	1977	Tunis	Tunisia	23–27 July	6	74	29	Tunisia	Egypt	Algeria
3	1982	Cairo	Egypt	16–22 October	7	84		Egypt		
4	1990	Tunis	Tunisia	20–26 August	8	96				
5	1998	Nairobi	Kenya	11–17 April	8	72	19	South Africa	Algeria	Angola
6	2002	Cairo	Egypt	12–18 August	12	131	12	South Africa	Egypt	Tunisia
7	2004	Casablanca	Morocco	1–7 May	16	114	38	South Africa	Egypt	Senegal
8	2006	Dakar	Senegal	11–16 September	17	121	40	South Africa	Algeria	Tunisia
9	2008	Johannesburg	South Africa	1–7 December	15	75	40	South Africa	Tunisia	Kenya
10	2010	Casablanca	Morocco	13–19 September	21	200	40	South Africa	Tunisia	Algeria
11	2012	Nairobi	Kenya	10–15 September	16		40	South Africa	Tunisia	Egypt
–	2014	Dakar	Senegal	Not held						
12	2016	Bloemfontein	South Africa	19–23 October	23		40	South Africa	Algeria	Egypt
13	2018	Algiers	Algeria	10–16 September	33	238	44	Egypt	South Africa	Algeria
–	2020	Johannesburg	South Africa	3–5 December	Cancelled because of the COVID-19 pandemic					
14	2021	Accra	Ghana	11–17 October			43	South Africa	Egypt	Algeria
15	2022	Tunis	Tunisia	20–24 August	29		42	South Africa	Algeria	Egypt
–	2023	Khartoum	Sudan	6–10 September	Not held					
16	2024	Luanda	Angola	30 April–4 May	42		42	Egypt	South Africa	Algeria
17	2026	Oran	Algeria	5–10 May	41	450	42	Egypt	Algeria	South Africa

=== All-time medal table (2006-2024) ===
Rank	Nation	Gold	Silver	Bronze	Total
1	South Africa	194	139	95	428
2	Egypt	75	101	96	272
3	Algeria	42	46	65	153
4	Tunisia	28	46	44	118
5	Kenya	15	11	5	31
6	Senegal	5	4	16	25
7	Morocco	2	6	12	20
8	Seychelles	2	2	5	9
9	Sudan	2	2	1	5
10	Mauritius	1	5	1	7
11	Ghana	1	2	2	5
11	Uganda	1	2	2	5
13	Angola	0	1	9	10
14	Zimbabwe	0	1	6	7
15	Namibia	0	1	1	2
15	Zambia	0	1	1	2
17	Cape Verde	0	0	2	2
17	Nigeria	0	0	2	2
Totals (18 entries)		368	370	365	1,103

== See also ==
- African Junior Swimming Championships
- African Masters Swimming Championships
- Swimming at the African Games
