= List of Mozambican records in swimming =

The Mozambican records in swimming are the fastest ever performances of swimmers from Mozambique, which are recognised and ratified by the Federação Moçambicana de Natação (FMN).

All records were set in finals unless noted otherwise.

== Long Course (50 m) ==
=== Men ===
Event	Time		Name	Club	Date	Meet	Location	Ref
50 m freestyle	23.36		Igor Mogne	Sporting CP	23 March 2018	Portuguese Championships	Funchal, Portugal	
100 m freestyle	50.61		Igor Mogne	Sporting CP	22 March 2018	Portuguese Championships	Funchal, Portugal	
200 m freestyle	1:50.91		Igor Mogne	Sporting CP	24 March 2018	Portuguese Championships	Funchal, Portugal	
400 m freestyle	3:54.38		Igor Mogne	Sporting CP	28 July 2018	Portuguese Open	Oeiras, Portugal	
800 m freestyle	8:42.86		Igor Mogne	Mozambique	6 May 2015	CANA Zone IV Championships	Luanda, Angola	
1500 m freestyle	18:14.85		Cleiton Munguambe	Tubarões	April 2021	Mozambican Championships	Maputo, Mozambique	
50 m backstroke	27.79	h	Erico Cuna	Mozambique	20 July 2017	Commonwealth Youth Games	Nassau, Bahamas	
100 m backstroke	1:00.74	h	Igor Mogne	Mozambique	24 July 2014	Commonwealth Games	Glasgow, Great Britain	
200 m backstroke	2:12.83		Igor Mogne	Mozambique	8 September 2015	African Games	Brazzaville, Congo	
50 m breaststroke	28.53	sf	Ludovico Corsini	Mozambique	8 April 2018	Commonwealth Games	Gold Coast, Australia	
100 m breaststroke	1:04.57	b	Ludovico Corsini	Mozambique	7 August 2017	Canadian Championships	Montreal, Canada	
200 m breaststroke	2:29.27	h	Caio Lobo	Mozambique	15 February 2024	World Championships	Doha, Qatar	
50 m butterfly	24.54		Matthew Lawrence	Benfica	2 April 2023	Portuguese Championships	Funchal, Portugal	
100 m butterfly	54.45		Igor Mogne	Sporting CP	14 April 2019	National Club Championship 1st Division	Oeiras, Portugal	
200 m butterfly	2:10.18		Igor Mogne	Sporting CP	9 February 2019	International Meeting of Lisbon	Lisbon, Portugal	
200 m individual medley	2:10.48	h	Kaio Faftine	Mozambique	30 July 2025	World Championships	Singapore, Singapore	
400 m individual medley	4:43.95	h	Kaio Faftine	Mozambique	8 September 2023	World Junior Championships	Netanya, Israel	
4×100 m freestyle relay	3:34.24		Cleyton Munguambe (52.50); Matthew Lawrence (53.91); Caio Miguel Lobo (54.29); Hugo Barradas (53.54)	Mozambique	8 May 2026	African Championships	Oran, Algeria	
4×200 m freestyle relay	8:19.24		Cleyton Munguambe (2:05.94); Mattew Lawrence (2:03.88); Caio Lobo (2:06.35); Kaio de Araujo (2:03.07)	Mozambique	11 March 2024	African Games	Accra, Ghana	
4×100 m medley relay	3:52.41		Erico Cuna (1:00.97); Ludovico Corsini (1:04.19); Igor Mogne (54.55); Denilson Da Costa (52.70)	Mozambique	10 April 2018	Commonwealth Games	Gold Coast, Australia	

Legend: # – Record awaiting ratification by FMN; WR – World record; AF – African record;
Records not set in finals: h – heat; sf – semifinal; r – relay 1st leg; rh – relay heat 1st leg; b – B final; † – en route to final mark; so – swim-off; tt – time trial

=== Women ===
Event	Time		Name	Club	Date	Meet	Location	Ref
50 m freestyle	26.20	h	Miriam Corsini	Dimensione Dello Sport SRL	19 November 2011	Memorial Romano Betti	Milan, Italy	
100 m freestyle	1:00.23	r	Miriam Corsini	Dimensione Dello Sport SRL	19 June 2005	Italian Junior Championships	Rome, Italy	
200 m freestyle	2:22.96		Gisela Cossa					
400 m freestyle	5:21.92		Layla Suneira Taquidi					
800 m freestyle								
1500 m freestyle								
50 m backstroke	29.71	h	Jessica Lyudmila Cossa	Mozambique	8 July 2015	Universiade	Gwangju, South Korea	
100 m backstroke	1:04.81	h	Jessica Lyudmila Cossa	Mozambique	6 July 2015	Universiade	Gwangju, South Korea	
200 m backstroke	2:22.23	h	Jessica Lyudmila Cossa	Mozambique	4 July 2015	Universiade	Gwangju, China	
50 m breaststroke	33.45	h	Miriam Corsini	Mozambique	3 August 2013	World Championships	Barcelona, Spain	
100 m breaststroke	1:10.90		Miriam Corsini	Dimensione Dello Sport SRL	7 June 2009	Trofeo Citta di Seregno	Seregno, Italy	
200 m breaststroke								
50 m butterfly	29.10	h	Jessica Lyudmila Cossa	Mozambique	4 July 2015	Universiade	Gwangju, China	
100 m butterfly	1:03.81	h	Jannah Sonnenschein	Mozambique	21 August 2014	Youth Olympic Games	Nanjing, China	
200 m butterfly	2:24.33	h	Jannah Sonnenschein	Mozambique	28 July 2014	Commonwealth Games	Glasgow, Great Britain	
200 m individual medley	2:51.70	h	Gisela Cossa	Mozambique	10 September 2015	African Games	Brazzaville, Congo	
400 m individual medley								
4×100 m freestyle relay	4:32.97			Mozambique	6 December 2023	African Junior Championships	Mauritius, Mauritius	
4×200 m freestyle relay								
4×100 m medley relay								

Legend: # – Record awaiting ratification by FMN; WR – World record; AF – African record;
Records not set in finals: h – heat; sf – semifinal; r – relay 1st leg; rh – relay heat 1st leg; b – B final; † – en route to final mark; so – swim-off; tt – time trial

=== Mixed relay ===
Event	Time		Name	Club	Date	Meet	Location	Ref
4×100 m freestyle relay	3:54.94	h	Kaio de Araujo (54.91); Denise Donelli (1:02.67); Alicia Mateus (1:04.11); Mattew Lawrence (53.25)	Mozambique	9 March 2024	African Games	Accra, Ghana	
4×100 m medley relay	4:18.90		Denise Donelli (1:09.07); Mattew Lawrence (1:05.71); Cleyton Munguambe (59.63); Alicia Mateus (1:04.49)	Mozambique	10 March 2024	African Games	Accra, Ghana	

Legend: # – Record awaiting ratification by FMN; WR – World record; AF – African record;
Records not set in finals: h – heat; so – swim-off

== Short Course (25 m) ==
=== Men ===
Event	Time		Name	Club	Date	Meet	Location	Ref
50 m freestyle	22.79	h	Igor Mogne	Sporting CP	9 December 2017	Portuguese Championships	Porto, Portugal	
100 m freestyle	48.93		Igor Mogne	Sporting CP	21 December 2018	Portuguese Championships	Felgueiras, Portugal	
200 m freestyle	1:46.66		Igor Mogne	Sporting CP	10 December 2017	Portuguese Championships	Porto, Portugal	
400 m freestyle	3:47.77		Igor Mogne	Sporting CP	9 December 2017	Portuguese Championships	Porto, Portugal	
800 m freestyle	8:19.68	†	Igor Mogne	Sporting CP	23 November 2023	Lisbon Championships	Alges, Portugal	
1500 m freestyle	15:52.57		Igor Mogne	Sporting CP	23 November 2023	Lisbon Championships	Alges, Portugal	
50 m backstroke	26.20	rh	Igor Mogne	Mozambique	13 December 2018	World Championships	Hangzhou, China	
100 m backstroke	58.31	h	Igor Mogne	Sporting CP	14 May 2017	Gesloures Anniversary Tournament	Loures, Portugal	
200 m backstroke								
50 m breaststroke	27.82	h	Matthew Lawrence	Benfica	8 November 2024	Algarve International Meeting	Albufeira, Portugal	
100 m breaststroke	1:01.16	h	Matthew Lawrence	Benfica	10 November 2024	Algarve International Meeting	Albufeira, Portugal	
200 m breaststroke								
50 m butterfly	23.93		Matthew Lawrence	Benfica	13 November 2022	Algarve International Meeting	Albufeira, Portugal	
100 m butterfly	52.73		Igor Mogne	Sporting CP	22 December 2018	Portuguese Championships	Felgueiras, Portugal	
200 m butterfly	2:05.64		Igor Mogne	Sporting CP	19 November 2017	Lisbon Championships	Alges, Portugal	
100 m individual medley								
200 m individual medley								
400 m individual medley								
4×50 m freestyle relay								
4×100 m freestyle relay								
4×200 m freestyle relay								
4×50 m medley relay								
4×100 m medley relay								

Legend: # – Record awaiting ratification by FMN; WR – World record; AF – African record;
Records not set in finals: h – heat; sf – semifinal; r – relay 1st leg; rh – relay heat 1st leg; b – B final; † – en route to final mark; so – swim-off; tt – time trial

=== Women ===
Event	Time		Name	Club	Date	Meet	Location	Ref
50 m freestyle	26.30	h	Miriam Corsini	Mozambique	15 December 2012	World Championships	Istanbul, Turkey	
100 m freestyle	58.40	h	Jessica Vieira	Mozambique	13 December 2012	World Championships	Istanbul, Turkey	
200 m freestyle								
400 m freestyle								
800 m freestyle								
1500 m freestyle								
50 m backstroke	31.80	h	Mozambique	12 April 2008	World Championships	Manchester, Great Britain		
100 m backstroke	1:09.24	h	Mozambique	9 April 2008	World Championships	Manchester, Great Britain		
200 m backstroke								
50 m breaststroke	32.05	h	Miriam Corsini	Mozambique	12 December 2012	World Championships	Istanbul, Turkey	
100 m breaststroke	1:11.73	h	Miriam Corsini	Mozambique	14 December 2012	World Championships	Istanbul, Turkey	
200 m breaststroke								
50 m butterfly	29.56	h	Jessica Vieira	Mozambique	13 December 2012	World Championships	Istanbul, Turkey	
100 m butterfly	1:05.97	h	Gessica Stagno	Mozambique	6 December 2014	World Championships	Doha, Qatar	
200 m butterfly								
100 m individual medley	1:07.63	h	Miriam Corsini	Mozambique	13 December 2012	World Championships	Istanbul, Turkey	
200 m individual medley								
400 m individual medley								
4×50 m freestyle relay								
4×100 m freestyle relay								
4×200 m freestyle relay								
4×50 m medley relay								
4×100 m medley relay								

Legend: # – Record awaiting ratification by FMN; WR – World record; AF – African record;
Records not set in finals: h – heat; sf – semifinal; r – relay 1st leg; rh – relay heat 1st leg; b – B final; † – en route to final mark; so – swim-off; tt – time trial

=== Mixed relay ===
Event	Time		Name	Club	Date	Meet	Location	Ref
4×50 m freestyle relay	1:47.12	h	Ludovico Corsini (25.04); Jannat Bique (28.74); Alicia Mateus (29.14); Igor Mogne (24.20)	Mozambique	12 December 2018	World Championships	Hangzhou, China	
4×50 m medley relay	1:52.20	h	Igor Mogne (26.20); Ludovico Corsini (27.80); Jannat Bique (29.94); Alicia Mateus (28.26)	Mozambique	13 December 2018	World Championships	Hangzhou, China	

Legend: # – Record awaiting ratification by FMN;
Records not set in finals: h – heat; so – swim-off
