= Mozambique at the 2025 World Aquatics Championships =

- Flag of Mozambique
- World Aquatics code: MOZ
- National federation: Federação Moçambicana de Natação

in Singapore
- Competitors: 4 in 2 sports
- Medals: Gold 0 Silver 0 Bronze 0 Total 0

World Aquatics Championships appearances
- 1973; 1975; 1978; 1982; 1986; 1991; 1994; 1998; 2001; 2003; 2005; 2007; 2009; 2011; 2013; 2015; 2017; 2019; 2022; 2023; 2024; 2025

Mozambique is competing at the 2025 World Aquatics Championships in Singapore from 11 July to 3 August 2025.

== Competitors ==
The following is the list of competitors in the Championships.

Sport	Men	Women	Total
Open water swimming	0	1	1
Swimming	2	1	3
Total	2	2	4

== Open water swimming ==
Women

Athlete	Event	Final	
Athlete	Event	Time	Rank
Ana Domingues	5 km	DNF	

== Swimming ==
Men

Athlete	Event	Heat		Semifinal		Final	
Athlete	Event	Time	Rank	Time	Rank	Time	Rank
Kaio Faftine	100 m butterfly	56.86	61	Did not advance			
Kaio Faftine	200 m medley	2:10.48 NR	42	Did not advance			
Matthew Lawrence	50 m breaststroke	28.82	58	Did not advance			
Matthew Lawrence	50 m butterfly	25.28	60	Did not advance			

Women

Athlete	Event	Heat		Semifinal		Final	
Athlete	Event	Time	Rank	Time	Rank	Time	Rank
Marta Mpfumo	50 m freestyle	29.76	83	Did not advance			
Marta Mpfumo	50 m butterfly	31.75	73	Did not advance			
