= Samoa at the 2025 World Aquatics Championships =

- Flag of Samoa
- World Aquatics code: SAM
- National federation: Samoa Swimming Association

in Singapore
- Competitors: 4 in 1 sport
- Medals: Gold 0 Silver 0 Bronze 0 Total 0

World Aquatics Championships appearances
- 2005; 2007; 2009; 2011; 2013; 2015; 2017; 2019; 2022; 2023; 2024; 2025

Samoa competed at the 2025 World Aquatics Championships in Singapore from July 11 to August 3, 2025.

== Competitors ==
The following is the list of competitors in the Championships.

Sport	Men	Women	Total
Swimming	2	2	4
Total	2	2	4

== Swimming ==
Samoa entered 4 swimmers.

Men

Athlete	Event	Heat		Semi-final		Final	
Athlete	Event	Time	Rank	Time	Rank	Time	Rank
Kokoro Frost	100 m backstroke	1:02.15	57	Did not advance			
Kokoro Frost	100 m butterfly	58.82	70	Did not advance			
Johann Stickland	50 m freestyle	23.79	65	Did not advance			
Johann Stickland	50 m butterfly	25.15	56	Did not advance			

Women

Athlete	Event	Heat		Semi-final		Final	
Athlete	Event	Time	Rank	Time	Rank	Time	Rank
Kaiya Brown	50 m freestyle	28.88	73	Did not advance			
Kaiya Brown	50 m backstroke	33.48	59	Did not advance			
Paige Schendelaar-Kemp	50 m butterfly	28.60	51	Did not advance			
Paige Schendelaar-Kemp	100 m butterfly	1:05.21	48	Did not advance			

Mixed

Athlete	Event	Heat		Final	
Athlete	Event	Time	Rank	Time	Rank
Paige Schendelaar-Kemp; Johann Stickland; Kaiya Brown; Kokoro Frost	4 × 100 m freestyle relay	3:53.99	29	Did not advance	
Paige Schendelaar-Kemp; Johann Stickland; Kaiya Brown; Kokoro Frost	4 × 100 m medley relay	4:24.22	31	Did not advance	
