= 2012 FINA World Swimming Championships (25 m) – Women's 50 metre freestyle =

Women's 50m Freestyle at the 2012 Short Course Worlds
- Dates: 15 December (heats and semifinals); 16 December (final)
- Winning time: 23.64

Medalists
gold medal	Aleksandra Gerasimenya	Belarus
silver medal	Francesca Halsall	Great Britain
bronze medal	Jeanette Ottesen	Denmark

The women's 50 metre freestyle event at the 11th FINA World Swimming Championships (25m) took place 15 – 16 December 2012 at the Sinan Erdem Dome.

== Records ==
Prior to this competition, the existing world and championship records were as follows.

	Name	Nation	Time	Location	Date
World record Championship record	Marleen Veldhuis	Netherlands	23.25	Manchester	13 April 2008

No new records were set during this competition.

== Results ==
=== Heats ===
Rank	Heat	Lane	Name	Time	Notes
1	11	4	Aleksandra Gerasimenya (BLR)	24.27	Q
2	12	4	Francesca Halsall (GBR)	24.41	Q
3	12	7	Christine Magnuson (USA)	24.42	Q
4	10	4	Britta Steffen (GER)	24.50	Q
5	10	7	Flávia Cazziolato (BRA)	24.58	Q
6	12	5	Jeanette Ottesen (DEN)	24.60	Q
7	10	3	Marieke Guehrer (AUS)	24.64	Q
8	12	3	Svetlana Kniaginina (RUS)	24.70	Q
9	10	2	Daniela Schreiber (GER)	24.81	Q
10	12	6	Hanna-Maria Seppälä (FIN)	24.82	Q
11	11	3	Anna Santamans (FRA)	24.87	Q
12	10	8	Sally Foster (AUS)	24.90	Q
13	12	0	Trudi Maree (RSA)	24.92	Q
14	2	4	Chen Xinyi (CHN)	24.95	Q
15	10	6	Chantal van Landeghem (CAN)	24.97	Q
16	12	2	Miki Uchida (JPN)	25.00	Q
17	11	2	Burcu Dolunay (TUR)	25.01	
18	10	1	Haruka Ueda (JPN)	25.09	
19	12	1	Miroslava Najdanovski (SRB)	25.16	
20	10	9	Miroslava Syllabová (SVK)	25.18	
20	11	7	Alessandra Marchioro (BRA)	25.18	
22	10	5	Triin Aljand (EST)	25.20	
23	9	6	Lehesta Kemp (RSA)	25.26	
24	11	0	Carolina Colorado Henao (COL)	25.30	
25	1	7	Wang Haibin (CHN)	25.32	
26	9	4	Sze Hang Yu (HKG)	25.33	
27	9	3	Nastja Govejšek (SLO)	25.41	
28	11	6	Rozaliya Nasretdinova (RUS)	25.43	
29	9	8	Jenjira Srisaard (THA)	25.45	
30	11	8	Theodora Drakou (GRE)	25.53	
31	9	7	Rebecca Turner (GBR)	25.54	
32	11	9	Amanda Lim (SIN)	25.75	
33	9	5	Heather MacLean (CAN)	25.78	
34	12	9	Mylene Ong (SIN)	25.80	
35	9	2	Julie Meynen (LUX)	25.82	
36	8	2	Allyson Roxanne Ponson (ARU)	25.95	
37	6	4	Moira Fraser (ZIM)	26.26	
37	9	1	Nilüfer Kuru (TUR)	26.26	
39	9	0	Miriam Corsini (MOZ)	26.30	
39	10	0	Fernanda González (MEX)	26.30	
41	8	0	Maria Lopez Nery Huerta (PAR)	26.37	
42	7	6	Anastasia Bogdanovski (MKD)	26.48	NR
43	7	9	Karen Torrez (BOL)	26.54	NR
44	6	3	Sylvia Tanya Brulehner (KEN)	26.61	NR
45	8	3	Birita Debes (FRO)	26.64	
46	8	9	Caroline Pickering Puamau (FIJ)	26.65	
47	8	6	Nicola Muscat (MLT)	26.68	NR
48	9	9	Lei On Kei (MAC)	26.73	
49	8	5	Jessica Teixeira Vieira (MOZ)	26.89	
50	8	8	Isabel Riquelme (CHI)	26.94	NR
51	5	4	Maria Jose Ribera (BOL)	27.05	
51	7	4	Anxhela Kashari (ALB)	27.05	
53	8	4	Kimiko Shihara Raheem (SRI)	27.07	
54	7	8	Planteau de Maroussem (MRI)	27.15	
55	7	3	Dalia Tórrez Zamora (NCA)	27.22	
56	7	5	Jade Howard (ZAM)	27.24	
57	6	0	Sariyah Sherry (BAR)	27.25	
58	5	2	Judith Ilan Meauri (PNG)	27.29	
59	5	6	Ana Sofia Nobrega (ANG)	27.32	
60	7	2	Monika Vasilyan (ARM)	27.40	
61	7	7	Jessica Cattaneo (PER)	27.41	
62	6	5	Ana Joselina Fortin (HON)	27.52	
63	2	2	Zamantha Hoss (PAN)	27.65	
64	6	8	Naomi Ruele (BOT)	27.72	
65	7	0	Oriele Espinoza (PER)	27.75	
66	7	1	Marie Meza (CRC)	27.86	
67	6	6	Fabiola Espinoza Herrera (NCA)	27.89	
68	5	3	Monica Saili (SAM)	28.08	
69	6	1	Emily Siobhan Muteti (KEN)	28.14	
70	5	5	Barbara Vali-Skelton (PNG)	28.22	
70	5	8	Sabine Hazboun (PLE)	28.22	
72	6	2	Aurelie Fanchette (SEY)	28.45	
73	2	3	Thet Ei Ei (MYA)	28.46	
74	6	7	Ann-Marie Hepler (MHL)	28.47	
75	6	9	Kiran Khan (PAK)	28.74	
76	5	7	Celeste Brown (COK)	28.88	
77	2	7	K. Zin Win (MYA)	29.06	
78	4	0	Kathleen Grace Noble (UGA)	29.22	
79	2	6	Mariam Foum (TAN)	29.34	
79	3	9	Domoinanavalona Amboaratiana (MAD)	29.34	
81	4	5	Aichatou Adelaide Diop (SEN)	29.50	
82	1	2	Deandra van der Colff (BOT)	29.58	
83	5	1	Athena Gaskin (GUY)	29.60	
84	2	8	Dirngulbai Misech (PLW)	29.77	
85	4	6	Felicity Passon (SEY)	29.84	
86	4	9	Faith Edorodion (NGR)	29.85	
87	4	2	Charissa Sofia Panuve (TGA)	29.98	
88	4	1	Hem Thon Vitiny (CAM)	30.02	
89	4	8	Merjen Saryyeva (TKM)	30.11	
90	5	0	Danielle Atoigue (GUM)	30.16	
91	1	1	Alphonsine Agahozo (RWA)	30.28	
92	4	4	Angela Kendrick (MHL)	30.47	
93	3	3	Deliya Saryyeva (TKM)	30.50	
94	3	5	Shne Joachim (VIN)	30.58	
95	4	7	Amanda Poppe (GUM)	30.62	
96	3	4	Aminath Shajan (MDV)	30.71	
97	3	6	Kibong Tanji (CMR)	31.67	
98	5	9	Mahnoor Maqsood (PAK)	31.72	
99	3	0	Roylin Melatik Akiwo (PLW)	31.76	
100	2	9	Angelika Ouedraogo (BUR)	31.93	
101	3	2	Shreya Dhital (NEP)	31.96	
102	1	5	Fatoumata Samassékou (MLI)	32.80	
103	3	1	Sara Al Flaij (BHR)	33.52	
104	3	7	Elsie Uwamahoro (BDI)	33.54	
105	2	0	Khahliso Caroline Mpeta (LES)	38.45	NR
106	2	5	Ramata Coulibaly (MLI)	39.65	
107	1	3	Ingrid Bethel Raissa Sanon (BUR)	41.15	
108	1	6	Daphne Ines Tchamsi (TOG)	50.63	
	2	1	Adzo Kpossi (TOG)	DSQ	
	1	4	Jeserik Pinto (VEN)	DNS	
	3	8	Nazlati Mohamed Andhumdine (COM)	DNS	
	4	3	Ophelia Swayne (GHA)	DNS	
	8	1	Christine Briedenhann (NAM)	DNS	
	8	7	Nguyen Thi Kim Tuyen (VIE)	DNS	
	11	1	Mie Nielsen (DEN)	DNS	
	11	5	Jessica Hardy (USA)	DNS	
	12	8	Rūta Meilutytė (LTU)	DNS	

=== Semifinals ===
Rank	Heat	Lane	Name	Nationality	Time	Notes
1	2	4	Aleksandra Gerasimenya	Belarus	24.13	Q
2	1	3	Jeanette Ottesen	Denmark	24.25	Q
3	1	5	Britta Steffen	Germany	24.27	Q
4	1	4	Francesca Halsall	United Kingdom	24.49	Q
4	2	5	Christine Magnuson	United States	24.49	Q
6	2	6	Marieke Guehrer	Australia	24.50	Q
7	2	3	Flávia Cazziolato	Brazil	24.55	Q
8	1	6	Svetlana Kniaginina	Russia	24.57	Q
9	1	8	Miki Uchida	Japan	24.69	NR
10	2	1	Trudi Maree	South Africa	24.74	
11	2	7	Anna Santamans	France	24.80	
12	2	8	Chantal van Landeghem	Canada	24.81	
12	2	2	Daniela Schreiber	Germany	24.81	
14	1	2	Hanna-Maria Seppälä	Finland	24.87	
15	1	1	Chen Xinyi	China	24.88	
16	1	7	Sally Foster	Australia	24.97	

=== Final ===
The final was held at 20:12.

Rank	Lane	Name	Nationality	Time	Notes
1st place, gold medalist(s)	4	Aleksandra Gerasimenya	Belarus	23.64	NR
2nd place, silver medalist(s)	6	Francesca Halsall	Great Britain	23.87	
3rd place, bronze medalist(s)	5	Jeanette Ottesen	Denmark	24.00	NR
4	3	Britta Steffen	Germany	24.04	
5	7	Marieke Guehrer	Australia	24.36	
6	2	Christine Magnuson	United States	24.42	
7	8	Svetlana Kniaginina	Russia	24.58	
8	1	Flávia Cazziolato	Brazil	24.83	
