= List of Samoan records in swimming =

The Samoan records in swimming are the fastest ever performances of swimmers from Samoa, which are recognised and ratified by the Samoa Swimming Federation.

All records were set in finals unless noted otherwise.

== Long Course (50 m) ==
=== Men ===
Event	Time		Name	Club	Date	Meet	Location	Ref
50 m freestyle	23.37		Hector Langkilde	Samoa	22 November 2023	Pacific Games	Honiara, Solomon Islands	
100 m freestyle	51.95	h	Brandon Schuster	Samoa	7 April 2018	Commonwealth Games	Gold Coast, Australia	
200 m freestyle	1:53.46		Brandon Schuster	Samoa	11 July 2019	Pacific Games	Apia, Samoa	
400 m freestyle	4:03.22		Brandon Schuster	Samoa	13 July 2019	Pacific Games	Apia, Samoa	
800 m freestyle	9:21.30	†	Sitivi Sooaemalelagi	Samoa	12 July 2019	Pacific Games	Apia, Samoa	
1500 m freestyle	17:43.86		Sitivi Sooaemalelagi	Samoa	12 July 2019	Pacific Games	Apia, Samoa	
50 m backstroke	27.50		Kokoro Frost	Samoa	22 April 2024	Oceania Championships	Gold Coast, Australia	
100 m backstroke	1:01.61		Solomona Hamilton	Samoa	21 April 2024	Oceania Championships	Gold Coast, Australia	
200 m backstroke	2:08.48		Brandon Schuster	Samoa	9 July 2019	Pacific Games	Apia, Samoa	
50 m breaststroke	29.25	h	Christian Toia	Samoa	26 July 2026	Commonwealth Games	Glasgow, United Kingdom	
100 m breaststroke	1:05.63		Christian Toia	Samoa	9 May 2026	Oceania Championships	Suva, Fiji	
200 m breaststroke	2:18.26		Brandon Schuster	Samoa	9 July 2019	Pacific Games	Apia, Samoa	
50m butterfly	24.58	b	Johann Stickland	Samoa	14 June 2023	Australian Trials	Melbourne, Australia	
100m butterfly	56.63		Winter Heaven	Samoa	23 June 2016	Oceania Championships	Suva, Fiji	
200m butterfly	2:17.09		Sitivi Sooaemalelagi	Samoa	13 July 2019	Pacific Games	Apia, Samoa	
200m individual medley	2:05.54		Brandon Schuster	Samoa	12 July 2019	Pacific Games	Apia, Samoa	
400m individual medley	4:24.04		Brandon Schuster	Samoa	10 July 2019	Pacific Games	Apia, Samoa	
4×100m freestyle relay	3:33.84		Johann Stickland (52.24); Hector Langkilde (52.20); Kokoro Frost (55.43); Solomona Hamilton (53.97)	Samoa	20 November 2023	Pacific Games	Honiara, Solomon Islands	
4×200m freestyle relay	8:19.99		Thomas Morriss (2:08.17); Brandon Schuster (1:56.43); Pitapola Ioane (2:12.51); Sitivi Sooaemalelagi (2:02.88)	Samoa	10 July 2019	Pacific Games	Apia, Samoa	
4×100m medley relay	4:02.01		Kobe Tuioti (1:01.42); Christian Toia (1:05.39); Kokoro Frost (59.57); Johann Stickland (55.63)	Samoa	11 May 2026	Oceania Championships	Suva, Fiji	

Legend: # – Record awaiting ratification by Samoa Swimming Federation; WR – World record; OC – Oceanian record;
Records not set in finals: h – heat; sf – semifinal; r – relay 1st leg; rh – relay heat 1st leg; b – B final; † – en route to final mark; so – swim-off; tt – time trial

=== Women ===
Event	Time		Name	Club	Date	Meet	Location	Ref
50 m freestyle	26.29	h	Olivia Borg	Samoa	22 November 2023	Pacific Games	Honiara, Solomon Islands	
100 m freestyle	57.53	h	Olivia Borg	Samoa	1 August 2022	Commonwealth Games	Birmingham, United Kingdom	
200 m freestyle	2:08.34	h	Nafanua Hamilton	Samoa	25 July 2026	Commonwealth Games	Glasgow, United Kingdom	
400 m freestyle	4:35.70		Alania Suttie	Samoa	9 September 2015	Commonwealth Youth Games	Apia, Samoa	
800 m freestyle	9:57.46	h	Monica Saili	-	2012			
1500 m freestyle								
50m backstroke	29.84		Lushavel Stickland	-	2019			
100m backstroke	1:04.43		Lushavel Stickland	Samoa	11 July 2019	Pacific Games	Apia, Samoa	
200m backstroke	2:19.89	h	Lauren Sale	Samoa	9 July 2019	Pacific Games	Apia, Samoa	
50m breaststroke	38.64		Monica Saili	-	2012			
100m breaststroke	1:20.49		Lauren Sale	Samoa	13 July 2019	Pacific Games	Apia, Samoa	
200m breaststroke	2:58.18		Monica Saili	-	2010			
50m butterfly	27.69	h	Paige Schendelaar-Kemp	Samoa	8 May 2026	Oceania Championships	Suva, Fiji	
100m butterfly	1:01.54		Olivia Borg	Samoa	20 November 2023	Pacific Games	Honiara, Solomon Islands	
200m butterfly	2:23.21		Olivia Borg	Samoa	22 November 2023	Pacific Games	Honiara, Solomon Islands	
200m individual medley	2:24.12		Lauren Sale	Samoa	12 July 2019	Pacific Games	Apia, Samoa	
400m individual medley	5:18.70		Alania Suttie	Samoa	22 June 2016	Oceania Championships	Suva, Fiji	
4×100m freestyle relay	4:00.90		Lauren Sale (1:00.41); Andrea Schuster (1:05.50); Jelani Freesir-Wetzell (57.32); Lushavel Stickland (56.77)	Samoa	11 July 2019	Pacific Games	Apia, Samoa	
4×200m freestyle relay	8:58.24		Jelani Freesir-Wetzell (2:16.29); Andrea Schuster (2:14.23); Kaiya Brown (2:25.75); Lauren Sale (2:11.97)	Samoa	10 July 2019	Pacific Games	Apia, Samoa	
4×100m medley relay	4:38.08		Lushavel Stickland (1:05.27); Lauren Sale (1:20.63); Andrea Schuster (1:11.61); Jelani Freesir-Wetzell (1:00.57)	Samoa	9 July 2019	Pacific Games	Apia, Samoa	

Legend: # – Record awaiting ratification by Samoa Swimming Federation; WR – World record; OC – Oceanian record;
Records not set in finals: h – heat; sf – semifinal; r – relay 1st leg; rh – relay heat 1st leg; b – B final; † – en route to final mark; so – swim-off; tt – time trial

=== Mixed relay ===
Event	Time		Name	Club	Date	Meet	Location	Ref
4×50 m freestyle relay	1:42.52		Lauren Salel; Vernon Wetzell; Lushavel Stickland; Brandon Schuster	Samoa	12 July 2019	Pacific Games	Apia, Samoa	
4×100 m freestyle relay	3:45.13	h	Johann Stickland (52.97); Paige Schendelaar-Kemp (59.21); Nafanua Hamilton (57.64); Christian Toia (55.31)	Samoa	25 July 2026	Commonwealth Games	Glasgow, United Kingdom	
4×50 m medley relay	1:54.89		Lushavel Stickland; Vernon Wetzell; Jelani Freesir-Wetzell; Brandon Schuster	Samoa	13 July 2019	Pacific Games	Apia, Samoa	
4×100 m medley relay	4:07.31	h	Nafanua Hamilton (1:05.54); Christian Toia (1:05.16); Paige Schendelaar-Kemp (1:03.89); Johann Stickland (52.72)	Samoa	28 July 2026	Commonwealth Games	Glasgow, United Kingdom	

Legend: # – Record awaiting ratification by Samoa Swimming Federation; WR – World record; OC – Oceanian record;
Records not set in finals: h – heat; so – swim-off

== Short Course (25 m) ==
=== Men ===
Event	Time		Name	Club	Date	Meet	Location	Ref
50 m freestyle	22.71	h	Hector Langkilde	Samoa	14 December 2024	World Championships	Budapest, Hungary	
100 m freestyle	50.67	h	Winter Heaven	Samoa	6 December 2014	World Championships	Doha, Qatar	
200 m freestyle	1:51.26	h	Brandon Schuster	Samoa	7 December 2016	World Championships	Windsor, Canada	
400 m freestyle	4:04.74	h	Brandon Schuster	Samoa	6 December 2016	World Championships	Windsor, Canada	
800 m freestyle								
1500 m freestyle								
50m backstroke	25.58	h	Kokoro Frost	Samoa	12 December 2024	World Championships	Budapest, Hungary	
100m backstroke	56.70	h	Kokoro Frost	Otaki Titans	20 August 2024	New Zealand Championships	Auckland, New Zealand	
200m backstroke	2:27.19	h	Brandon Schuster	Samoa	16 December 2012	World Championships	Istanbul, Turkey	
50m breaststroke	29.68		Johann Stickland	Samoa	1 July 2025	Pacific Mini Games	Koror, Palau	
100m breaststroke	1:04.72	h, †	Brandon Schuster	Samoa	18 December 2021	World Championships	Abu Dhabi, United Arab Emirates	
200m breaststroke	2:13.75	h	Brandon Schuster	Samoa	18 December 2021	World Championships	Abu Dhabi, United Arab Emirates	
50m butterfly	24.25	h	Kokoro Frost	Samoa	10 December 2024	World Championships	Budapest, Hungary	
100m butterfly	55.37		Kokoro Frost	Otaki Titans	22 August 2024	New Zealand Championships	Auckland, New Zealand	
200m butterfly								
100m individual medley	58.78	h	Brandon Schuster	Samoa	8 December 2016	World Championships	Windsor, Canada	
200m individual medley	2:00.77	h	Brandon Schuster	Samoa	11 December 2018	World Championships	Hangzhou, China	
400m individual medley	4:17.20	h	Brandon Schuster	Samoa	15 December 2018	World Championships	Hangzhou, China	
4×50m freestyle relay								
4×100m freestyle relay								
4×200m freestyle relay								
4×50m medley relay								
4×100m medley relay								

Legend: # – Record awaiting ratification by Samoa Swimming Federation; WR – World record; OC – Oceanian record;
Records not set in finals: h – heat; sf – semifinal; r – relay 1st leg; rh – relay heat 1st leg; b – B final; † – en route to final mark; so – swim-off; tt – time trial

=== Women ===
Event	Time		Name	Club	Date	Meet	Location	Ref
50 m freestyle	26.10	h	Lushavel Stickland	Samoa	11 December 2016	World Championships	Windsor, Canada	
100 m freestyle	56.19	h	Lushavel Stickland	Samoa	12 December 2018	World Championships	Hangzhou, China	
200 m freestyle	2:12.65	h	Monica Saili	Samoa	16 December 2012	World Championships	Istanbul, Turkey	
400 m freestyle	4:32.72	h	Alania Suttie	Samoa	9 December 2016	World Championships	Windsor, Canada	
800 m freestyle	9:23.63		Monica Saili	Samoa	13 December 2012	World Championships	Istanbul, Turkey	
1500 m freestyle								
50m backstroke	28.59	h	Lushavel Stickland	Samoa	9 December 2016	World Championships	Windsor, Canada	
100m backstroke	1:00.75	h	Lushavel Stickland	Samoa	11 December 2018	World Championships	Hangzhou, China	
200m backstroke								
50m breaststroke	36.57	h	Monica Saili	Samoa	12 December 2012	World Championships	Istanbul, Turkey	
100m breaststroke	1:20.66	h	Monica Saili	Samoa	14 December 2012	World Championships	Istanbul, Turkey	
200m breaststroke								
50m butterfly	27.09	h	Olivia Borg	Samoa	13 December 2022	World Championships	Melbourne, Australia	
100m butterfly	1:00.13	h	Olivia Borg	Samoa	17 December 2022	World Championships	Melbourne, Australia	
200m butterfly	2:27.37	h	Alania Suttie	Samoa	7 December 2016	World Championships	Windsor, Canada	
100m individual medley	1:04.02	h	Lushavel Stickland	Samoa	8 December 2016	World Championships	Windsor, Canada	
200m individual medley								
400m individual medley	5:09.44	h	Alania Suttie	Samoa	6 December 2016	World Championships	Windsor, Canada	
4×50m freestyle relay								
4×100m freestyle relay								
4×200m freestyle relay								
4×50m medley relay								
4×100m medley relay								

Legend: # – Record awaiting ratification by Samoa Swimming Federation; WR – World record; OC – Oceanian record;
Records not set in finals: h – heat; sf – semifinal; r – relay 1st leg; rh – relay heat 1st leg; b – B final; † – en route to final mark; so – swim-off; tt – time trial
