= 2012 FINA World Swimming Championships (25 m) – Women's 100 metre freestyle =

Women's 100m Freestyle at the 2012 Short Course Worlds
- Dates: 13 December (heats and semifinals); 14 December (final)
- Winning time: 52.31

Medalists
gold medal	Britta Steffen	Germany
silver medal	Megan Romano	United States
bronze medal	Tang Yi	China

The women's 100 metre freestyle event at the 11th FINA World Swimming Championships (25m) took place December 13-14, 2012 at the Sinan Erdem Dome.

== Records ==
Prior to this competition, the existing world and championship records were as follows.

	Name	Nation	Time	Location	Date
World record	Libby Trickett	Australia	51.01	Hobart	10 August 2009
Championship record	Ranomi Kromowidjojo	Netherlands	51.44	Dubai	17 December 2010

No new records were set during this competition.

== Results ==
=== Heats ===
Rank	Heat	Lane	Name	Time	Notes
1	11	5	Marieke Guehrer (AUS)	53.26	Q
2	9	3	Tang Yi (CHN)	53.32	Q
3	9	4	Jessica Hardy (USA)	53.42	Q
3	10	4	Britta Steffen (GER)	53.42	Q
5	9	0	Rūta Meilutytė (LTU)	53.54	NR
6	11	1	Megan Romano (USA)	53.57	Q
7	11	3	Daniela Schreiber (GER)	53.59	Q
8	10	5	Veronika Popova (RUS)	53.82	Q
9	10	1	Alessandra Marchioro (BRA)	53.95	Q
10	9	5	Michelle Coleman (SWE)	53.96	Q
11	1	3	Nina Rangelova (BUL)	54.01	Q, NR
12	11	8	Haruka Ueda (JPN)	54.04	Q
13	10	6	Angie Bainbridge (AUS)	54.10	Q
14	9	8	Sze Hang Yu (HKG)	54.15	Q, NR
15	11	2	Melanie Costa (ESP)	54.25	
16	9	1	Larissa Oliveira (BRA)	54.27	Q
17	9	6	Louise Hansson (SWE)	54.42	Q
18	10	2	Chantal van Landeghem (CAN)	54.56	Q
18	11	9	Eszter Dara (HUN)	54.56	
20	10	3	Hanna-Maria Seppälä (FIN)	54.57	
21	10	9	Miki Uchida (JPN)	54.58	
22	10	7	Heather MacLean (CAN)	54.60	
23	10	8	Qiu Yuhan (CHN)	54.69	
24	11	6	Pernille Blume (DEN)	54.74	
25	11	7	Rebecca Turner (GBR)	54.97	
26	9	2	Burcu Dolunay (TUR)	54.98	
27	11	0	Carolina Colorado Henao (COL)	55.21	
28	1	5	Alice Mizzau (ITA)	55.34	
29	2	7	Elmira Aigaliyeva (KAZ)	55.53	
30	8	7	Julie Meynen (LUX)	55.60	NR
31	8	1	Lehesta Kemp (RSA)	55.68	
31	9	9	Mylene Ong (SIN)	55.68	
31	10	0	Anna Santamans (FRA)	55.68	
34	8	0	Yang Chin-Kuei (TPE)	55.71	
35	8	2	Nastja Govejšek (SLO)	55.76	
36	8	9	Jessica Camposano (COL)	55.85	
37	8	8	Miroslava Syllabová (SVK)	55.97	
38	7	4	Rozaliya Nasretdinova (RUS)	56.06	
39	8	5	Urša Bežan (SLO)	56.13	
40	8	3	Amanda Lim (SIN)	56.16	
41	7	5	Esra Kubra Kacmaz (TUR)	56.19	
42	8	4	Danielle Villars (SUI)	56.24	
43	8	6	Fernanda González (MEX)	56.31	
44	6	6	Anastasia Bogdanovski (MKD)	56.75	NR
45	6	7	Moira Fraser (ZIM)	57.13	
46	7	7	Allyson Roxanne Ponson (ARU)	57.22	
47	5	6	Karen Torrez (BOL)	57.31	NR
48	6	5	Christine Briedenhann (NAM)	57.95	NR
49	7	3	Nicola Muscat (MLT)	58.05	NR
50	7	9	Birita Debes (FRO)	58.23	
51	5	2	Lei On Kei (MAC)	58.33	
52	6	8	Zabrina Holder (BAR)	58.37	
53	6	4	Jessica Vieira (MOZ)	58.40	
54	6	9	Maria Lopez Nery Huerta (PAR)	58.53	
55	6	2	Olivia Planteau de Maroussem (MRI)	58.57	
56	7	2	Andrea Cedrón (PER)	58.63	
57	5	0	Sylvia Tanya Brulehner (KEN)	58.68	
58	6	3	Isabel Riquelme (CHI)	58.89	
59	6	1	Monika Vasilyan (ARM)	58.93	
60	7	0	Jade Howard (ZIM)	59.00	
61	6	0	Tan Chi Yan (MAC)	59.03	
62	7	1	Machiko Suharmee Raheem (SRI)	59.18	
63	5	8	Ana Sofia Nobrega (ANG)	59.28	
64	5	4	Marie Meza (CRC)	59.42	
65	5	7	Mónica Ramírez (AND)	59.60	
66	7	8	Jessica Cattaneo (PER)	59.96	
67	5	1	Ana Joselina Fortin (HON)	1:00.02	
68	5	5	Sariyah Sherry (BAR)	1:00.16	
69	4	0	Judith Ilan Meauri (PNG)	1:00.24	
70	4	7	Maria Jose Ribera (BOL)	1:00.44	
71	3	4	Naomi Ruele (BOT)	1:00.51	
72	2	9	Zamantha Hoss (PAN)	1:00.71	
73	4	1	Monica Saili (SAM)	1:01.09	
74	2	0	Estellah Fils Rabetsara (MAD)	1:01.73	
75	5	3	Jayaveena Arcot Vijaykumar (IND)	1:01.81	
76	4	6	Emily Siobhan Muteti (KEN)	1:01.93	
77	5	9	Fabiola Espinoza Herrera (NCA)	1:01.95	
78	4	5	Nathalie Sanchez Hernandez (ESA)	1:02.15	
79	4	9	Aurelie Fanchette (SEY)	1:02.19	
80	4	2	Tieri Erasito (FIJ)	1:02.21	
81	2	8	Thet Ei Ei (MYA)	1:02.56	
82	4	8	Barbara Vali-Skelton (PNG)	1:03.38	
83	4	4	Ann Marie Hepler (MHL)	1:04.04	
84	3	5	Celeste Brown (COK)	1:04.36	
85	3	1	Felicity Passon (SEY)	1:05.23	
86	3	6	Charissa Sofia Panuve (TGA)	1:05.29	
87	4	3	Danielle Atoigue (GUM)	1:05.54	
88	3	2	Amanda Poppe (GUM)	1:06.61	
89	1	4	Dirngulbai Misech (PLW)	1:07.24	
90	3	0	Keyik Veliyeva (TKM)	1:07.92	
91	3	8	Angela Kendrick (MHL)	1:08.75	
92	3	3	Mahnoor Maqsood (PAK)	1:08.85	
93	2	4	Aminath Shajan (MDV)	1:09.83	
94	3	9	Shreya Dhital (NEP)	1:11.22	
95	3	7	Merjen Saryyeva (TKM)	1:11.84	
96	2	5	Shne Joachim (VIN)	1:11.85	
97	2	3	Sara Al Flaij (BHR)	1:12.33	
98	1	2	Fatoumata Samassékou (MLI)	1:13.64	
99	2	1	Roylin Melatik Akiwo (PLW)	1:13.74	
100	2	6	Elsie Uwamahoro (BDI)	1:15.13	
	1	6	Wendy Rodriguez (VEN)	DNS	
	2	2	Nazlati Mohamed Andhumdine (COM)	DNS	
	7	6	Karin Prinsloo (RSA)	DNS	
	9	7	Mie Nielsen (DEN)	DNS	
	11	4	Francesca Halsall (GBR)	DNS	

=== Semifinals ===
Rank	Heat	Lane	Name	Nationality	Time	Notes
1	2	3	Megan Romano	United States	52.86	Q
2	1	5	Britta Steffen	Germany	53.09	Q
3	1	4	Tang Yi	China	53.13	Q
4	1	7	Angie Bainbridge	Australia	53.30	Q
5	1	3	Daniela Schreiber	Germany	53.41	Q
5	2	5	Jessica Hardy	United States	53.41	Q
7	2	2	Michelle Coleman	Sweden	53.42	Q
8	2	8	Louise Hansson	Sweden	53.52	Q
9	2	4	Marieke Guehrer	Australia	53.59	
10	2	7	Haruka Ueda	Japan	53.76	
11	2	6	Veronika Popova	Russia	53.86	
12	1	1	Larissa Oliveira	Brazil	53.93	
13	1	6	Alessandra Marchioro	Brazil	54.05	
14	1	8	Chantal Van Landeghem	Canada	54.16	
15	2	1	Sze Hang Yu	Hong Kong	54.51	
16	1	2	Nina Rangelova	Bulgaria	54.53	

- Rūta Meilutytė of Lithuania withdrew because of too tight schedule.

=== Final ===
The final was held at 19:09.

Rank	Lane	Name	Nationality	Time	Notes
1st place, gold medalist(s)	5	Britta Steffen	Germany	52.31	
2nd place, silver medalist(s)	4	Megan Romano	United States	52.48	
3rd place, bronze medalist(s)	3	Tang Yi	China	52.73	
4	2	Daniela Schreiber	Germany	53.05	
5	6	Angie Bainbridge	Australia	53.09	
6	1	Michelle Coleman	Sweden	53.45	
7	7	Jessica Hardy	United States	53.52	
8	8	Louise Hansson	Sweden	53.65	
