= Samoa at the 2023 World Aquatics Championships =

- Flag of Samoa
- FINA code: SAM
- National federation: Samoa Swimming Association

in Fukuoka, Japan
- Competitors: 4 in 1 sport
- Medals: Gold 0 Silver 0 Bronze 0 Total 0

World Aquatics Championships appearances
- 2005; 2007; 2009; 2011; 2013; 2015; 2017; 2019; 2022; 2023; 2024

Samoa is set to compete at the 2023 World Aquatics Championships in Fukuoka, Japan from 14 to 30 July.

== Swimming ==
Samoa entered 4 swimmers.

Men

| Athlete | Event | Heat | | Semifinal | | Final | |
| Athlete | Event | Time | Rank | Time | Rank | Time | Rank |
|---|---|---|---|---|---|---|---|
| Kokoro Frost | 50 metre butterfly | 25.58 NR | 62 | Did not advance | | | |
| Kokoro Frost | 100 metre butterfly | 1:00.20 | 67 | Did not advance | | | |
| Brandon Schuster | 50 metre freestyle | 24.19 | 72 | Did not advance | | | |
| Brandon Schuster | 100 metre freestyle | 53.75 | 86 | Did not advance | | | |

Women

| Athlete | Event | Heat | | Semifinal | | Final | |
| Athlete | Event | Time | Rank | Time | Rank | Time | Rank |
|---|---|---|---|---|---|---|---|
| Olivia Borg | 50 metre butterfly | 27.77 NR | 35 | Did not advance | | | |
| Olivia Borg | 100 metre butterfly | 1:01.80 NR | 34 | Did not advance | | | |
| Kaiya Brown | 50 metre freestyle | 28.04 | 65 | Did not advance | | | |
| Kaiya Brown | 100 metre freestyle | 1:02.01 | 60 | Did not advance | | | |

Mixed

| Athlete | Event | Heat | | Final | |
| Athlete | Event | Time | Rank | Time | Rank |
|---|---|---|---|---|---|
| Olivia Borg; Brandon Schuster; Kaiya Brown; Kokoro Frost | 4 × 100 m freestyle relay | 3:49.29 | 32 | Did not advance | |
