= Swimming at the 2018 Commonwealth Games – Men's 4 × 100 metre medley relay =

Men's 4 × 100 metre medley relay at the 2018 Commonwealth Games
- Venue: Gold Coast Aquatic Centre
- Dates: 10 April
- Competitors: 57 from 10 nations
- Winning time: 3:31.04

Medalists
gold medal	Mitch Larkin; Jake Packard; Grant Irvine; Kyle Chalmers; Bradley Woodward; Matt Wilson; David Morgan; Jack Cartwright	Australia
silver medal	Luke Greenbank; Adam Peaty; James Guy; Ben Proud; Jarvis Parkinson; Elliot Clogg; James Wilby; Jacob Peters; David Cumberlidge	England
bronze medal	Calvyn Justus; Cameron van der Burgh; Chad le Clos; Brad Tandy; Martin Binedell; Michael Houlie; Ryan Coetzee	South Africa

The men's 4 × 100 metre medley relay event at the 2018 Commonwealth Games as part of the swimming program took place on 10 April at the Gold Coast Aquatic Centre.

== Records ==
Prior to this competition, the existing world and Commonwealth Games records were as follows.

Record	Time	Athlete (nation)	Meet	Location	Date	Ref
World record	3:27.28	United States (USA)		Rome, Italy	2 August 2009	
Commonwealth record	3:28.64	Australia (AUS)		Rome, Italy	2 August 2009	
Games record	3:31.51	England		Glasgow, United Kingdom	29 July 2014	

The following records were established during the competition:

Date	Event	Nation	Swimmers	Time	Record
10 April	Final	Australia	Mitch Larkin (53.14); Jake Packard (59.29); Grant Irvine (51.36); Kyle Chalmers (47.25)	3:31.04	GR

== Results ==
=== Heats ===
The heats were held at 11:31.

Rank	Heat	Lane	Nation	Swimmers	Time	Notes
1	2	4	Australia	Bradley Woodward (54.01); Matt Wilson (59.03); David Morgan (52.14); Jack Cartwright (48.43)	3:33.61	Q
2	2	6	England	Elliot Clogg (55.62); James Wilby (59.19); Jacob Peters (53.27); David Cumberlidge (48.60)	3:36.68	Q
3	1	4	Scotland	Stephen Milne (55.55); Craig Benson (1:00.29); Sean Campsie (53.53); Jack Thorpe (49.42)	3:38.79	Q
4	2	5	Canada	Markus Thormeyer (55.32); Elijah Wall (1:01.27); Josiah Binnema (54.08); Ruslan Gaziev (50.12)	3:40.79	Q
5	2	2	South Africa	Martin Binedell (56.15); Michael Houlie (1:02.18); Ryan Coetzee (54.04); Calvyn Justus (50.07)	3:42.44	Q
6	1	5	Northern Ireland	Conor Ferguson (55.21); Jamie Graham (1:03.01); Jordan Sloan (54.89); David Thompson (49.88)	3:42.99	Q
7	1	2	Mozambique	Erico Cuna (1:01.62); Ludovico Corsini (1:04.69); Igor Mogne (57.13); Denilson da Costa (52.47)	3:55.91	Q
8	2	3	Mauritius	Mathieu Marquet (1:01.25); Jonathan Chung Yee (1:06.74); Gregory Anodin (1:02.23); Bradley Vincent (54.29)	4:04.51	Q
9	1	3	Gibraltar	Jordan Gonzalez (1:02.96); James Sanderson (1:11.29); Aidan Carrol (58.20); Matt Savitz (55.62)	4:08.07	
10	1	6	Papua New Guinea	Josh Tarere (1:07.32); Ashley Seeto (1:08.30); Samuel Seghers (58.64); Leonard Kalate (55.00)	4:09.26	

=== Final ===
The final was held at 21:52.

Rank	Lane	Nation	Swimmers	Time	Notes
1st place, gold medalist(s)	4	Australia	Mitch Larkin (53.14); Jake Packard (59.29); Grant Irvine (51.36); Kyle Chalmers (47.25)	3:31.04	GR
2nd place, silver medalist(s)	5	England	Luke Greenbank (54.61); Adam Peaty (57.64); James Guy (50.95); Ben Proud (47.93)	3:31.13	
3rd place, bronze medalist(s)	2	South Africa	Calvyn Justus (55.79); Cameron van der Burgh (59.20); Chad le Clos (50.10); Brad Tandy (49.70)	3:34.79	
4	3	Scotland	Craig McNally (55.24); Ross Murdoch (59.36); Mark Szaranek (52.93); Duncan Scott (47.62)	3:35.15	
5	6	Canada	Markus Thormeyer (54.61); Elijah Wall (1:01.34); Josiah Binnema (52.28); Yuri Kisil (47.89)	3:36.12	
6	7	Northern Ireland	Conor Ferguson (54.58); Jamie Graham (1:02.85); James Brown (55.10); Jordan Sloan (48.55)	3:41.08	
7	1	Mozambique	Erico Cuna (1:00.97); Ludovico Corsini (1:04.19); Igor Mogne (54.55); Denilson da Costa (52.70)	3:52.41	
8	8	Mauritius	Bradley Vincent (1:00.00); Jonathan Chung Yee (1:06.13); Mathieu Marquet (57.98); Gregory Anodin (53.18)	3:57.29	
