= Mozambique at the 2017 World Aquatics Championships =

- Flag of Mozambique
- World Aquatics code: MOZ
- National federation: Federação Moçambicana de Natação

in Budapest, Hungary
- Competitors: 4 in 1 sport
- Medals: Gold 0 Silver 0 Bronze 0 Total 0

World Aquatics Championships appearances
- 1973; 1975; 1978; 1982; 1986; 1991; 1994; 1998; 2001; 2003; 2005; 2007; 2009; 2011; 2013; 2015; 2017; 2019; 2022; 2023; 2024; 2025

Mozambique competed at the 2017 World Aquatics Championships in Budapest, Hungary from 14 July to 30 July.

== Swimming ==
Mozambique has received a Universality invitation from FINA to send a maximum of four swimmers (two men and two women) to the World Championships.

| Athlete | Event | Heat | | Semifinal | | Final | |
| Athlete | Event | Time | Rank | Time | Rank | Time | Rank |
|---|---|---|---|---|---|---|---|
| Denílson da Costa | Men's 50 m freestyle | 23.93 | 77 | Did not advance | | | |
| Denílson da Costa | Men's 50 m butterfly | 26.35 | 62 | Did not advance | | | |
| Igor Mogne | Men's 200 m freestyle | 1:51.48 | 52 | Did not advance | | | |
| Igor Mogne | Men's 400 m freestyle | 3:55.97 | 37 | —N/a | | Did not advance | |
| Gisela Cossa | Women's 50 m freestyle | 30.12 | 71 | Did not advance | | | |
| Gisela Cossa | Women's 50 m backstroke | 34.11 | 58 | Did not advance | | | |
| Gessica Stagno | Women's 50 m butterfly | DNS | | Did not advance | | | |
| Gessica Stagno | Women's 100 m butterfly | DNS | | Did not advance | | | |
