= Samoa at the 2017 World Aquatics Championships =

- Flag of Samoa
- FINA code: SAM
- National federation: Samoa Swimming Federation

in Budapest, Hungary
- Competitors: 3 in 1 sport
- Medals: Gold 0 Silver 0 Bronze 0 Total 0

World Aquatics Championships appearances
- 2005; 2007; 2009; 2011; 2013; 2015; 2017; 2019; 2022; 2023; 2024

Samoa competed at the 2017 World Aquatics Championships in Budapest, Hungary from 14 July to 30 July.

== Swimming ==
Samoa has received a Universality invitation from FINA to send three swimmers (one man and two women) to the World Championships.

Athlete	Event	Heat		Semifinal		Final	
Athlete	Event	Time	Rank	Time	Rank	Time	Rank
Brandon Schuster	Men's 200 m individual medley	2:07.64	38	did not advance			
Brandon Schuster	Men's 400 m individual medley	4:34.60	37	—		did not advance	
Lushavel Stickland	Women's 50 m backstroke	30.04	42	did not advance			
Lushavel Stickland	Women's 100 m backstroke	1:04.96	42	did not advance			
Alania Suttie	Women's 100 m butterfly	1:08.77	43	did not advance			
Alania Suttie	Women's 200 m butterfly	2:35.11	35	did not advance			
