= Samoa at the 2024 World Aquatics Championships =

- Flag of Samoa
- World Aquatics code: SAM
- National federation: Samoa Swimming Association

in Doha, Qatar
- Competitors: 3 in 1 sport
- Medals: Gold 0 Silver 0 Bronze 0 Total 0

World Aquatics Championships appearances
- 2005; 2007; 2009; 2011; 2013; 2015; 2017; 2019; 2022; 2023; 2024; 2025

Samoa competed at the 2024 World Aquatics Championships in Doha, Qatar from 2 to 18 February.

== Swimming ==
Samoa entered 3 swimmers.

Men

Athlete	Event	Heat		Semifinal		Final	
Athlete	Event	Time	Rank	Time	Rank	Time	Rank
Kokoro Frost	50 metre butterfly	25.86	46	Did not advance			
Kokoro Frost	100 metre butterfly	59.75	59	Did not advance			
Johann Stickland	50 metre freestyle	23.75	56	Did not advance			
Johann Stickland	100 metre freestyle	52.33	66	Did not advance			

Women

Athlete	Event	Heat		Semifinal		Final	
Athlete	Event	Time	Rank	Time	Rank	Time	Rank
Kaiya Brown	50 metre freestyle	28.30	69	Did not advance			
Kaiya Brown	100 metre freestyle	1:02.84	63	Did not advance			
