= Samoa at the 2015 World Aquatics Championships =

- Flag of Samoa
- World Aquatics code: SAM
- National federation: Samoa Swimming Federation

in Kazan, Russia
- Competitors: 3 in 1 sport
- Medals: Gold 0 Silver 0 Bronze 0 Total 0

World Aquatics Championships appearances
- 2005; 2007; 2009; 2011; 2013; 2015; 2017; 2019; 2022; 2023; 2024; 2025

Samoa competed at the 2015 World Aquatics Championships in Kazan, Russia from 24 July to 9 August 2015.

== Swimming ==
Samoan swimmers have achieved qualifying standards in the following events (up to a maximum of 2 swimmers in each event at the A-standard entry time, and 1 at the B-standard):

Men

Athlete	Event	Heat		Semifinal		Final	
Athlete	Event	Time	Rank	Time	Rank	Time	Rank
Winter Heaven	100 m freestyle	52.77	76	did not advance			
Winter Heaven	100 m butterfly	57.47	58	did not advance			
Brandon Schuster	200 m freestyle	1:57.93	69	did not advance			
Brandon Schuster	400 m freestyle	4:15.30	66	—		did not advance	

Women

Athlete	Event	Heat		Semifinal		Final	
Athlete	Event	Time	Rank	Time	Rank	Time	Rank
Evelina Afoa	50 m backstroke	31.74	43	did not advance			
Evelina Afoa	100 m backstroke	1:08.43 NR	59	did not advance			
