= Samoa at the 2022 World Aquatics Championships =

- Flag of Samoa
- World Aquatics code: SAM
- National federation: Samoa Swimming Federation

in Budapest, Hungary
- Competitors: 2 in 1 sport
- Medals: Gold 0 Silver 0 Bronze 0 Total 0

World Aquatics Championships appearances
- 2005; 2007; 2009; 2011; 2013; 2015; 2017; 2019; 2022; 2023; 2024; 2025

Samoa competed at the 2022 World Aquatics Championships in Budapest, Hungary from 18 June to 3 July.

== Swimming ==
Samoan swimmers have achieved qualifying standards in the following events.

| Athlete | Event | Heat | | Semifinal | | Final | |
| Athlete | Event | Time | Rank | Time | Rank | Time | Rank |
|---|---|---|---|---|---|---|---|
| Brandon Schuster | Men's 200 m breaststroke | 2:25.04 | 39 | did not advance | | | |
| Brandon Schuster | Men's 200 m individual medley | 2:08.95 | 37 | did not advance | | | |
| Olivia Borg | Women's 50 m butterfly | 27.43 | 35 | did not advance | | | |
| Olivia Borg | Women's 100 m butterfly | 1:01.19 | 19 | did not advance | | | |
