= 2012 FINA World Swimming Championships (25 m) – Women's 100 metre individual medley =

Women's 100m Individual Medley at the 2012 Short Course Worlds
- Dates: 13 December (heats and semifinals); 14 December (final)
- Winning time: 58.49

Medalists
gold medal	Katinka Hosszú	Hungary
silver medal	Ruta Meilutyte	Lithuania
bronze medal	Jing Zhao	China

The women's 100 metre individual medley event at the 11th FINA World Swimming Championships (25m) took place 13 – 14 December 2012 at the Sinan Erdem Dome.

== Records ==
Prior to this competition, the existing world and championship records were as follows.

	Name	Nation	Time	Location	Date
World record	Hinkelien Schreuder	Netherlands	57.74	Berlin	15 November 2009
Championship record	Ariana Kukors	United States	58.65	Dubai	16 December 2010

The following records were established during the competition:

Date	Event	Name	Nation	Time	Record
14 December	Final	Katinka Hosszú	Hungary	58.49	CR

== Results ==
=== Heats ===
Rank	Heat	Lane	Name	Time	Notes
1	5	4	Sophie Allen (GBR)	59.20	Q
2	5	3	Rūta Meilutytė (LTU)	59.33	Q, NR
3	7	4	Katinka Hosszú (HUN)	59.37	Q
4	7	3	Kanako Watanabe (JPN)	59.74	Q, NR
5	6	4	Zsuzsanna Jakabos (HUN)	59.84	Q
6	1	5	Melanie Margalis (USA)	1:00.03	Q
6	7	5	Theresa Michalak (GER)	1:00.03	Q
8	2	8	Aleksandra Gerasimenya (BLR)	1:00.32	Q
9	1	8	Zhao Jing (CHN)	1:00.37	Q
10	7	7	Chen Xinyi (CHN)	1:00.45	Q
11	5	5	Hanna-Maria Seppälä (FIN)	1:00.79	Q
12	6	3	Emu Higuchi (JPN)	1:00.85	Q
13	6	5	Alia Atkinson (JAM)	1:00.99	Q
13	7	6	Emilia Pikkarainen (FIN)	1:00.99	Q
15	1	3	Hannah Miley (GBR)	1:01.19	WD
16	7	8	Alicja Tchórz (POL)	1:01.37	Q
17	2	7	Madeline Dirado (USA)	1:01.55	Q
18	7	2	Birgit Koschischek (AUT)	1:01.56	
19	5	9	Hanna Dzerkal (UKR)	1:01.62	
20	5	6	Katrine Soerensen (DEN)	1:01.74	
21	6	6	Vitalina Simonova (RUS)	1:01.77	
22	1	4	Hrafnhildur Lúthersdóttir (ISL)	1:01.85	
23	6	1	Ellen Fullerton (AUS)	1:02.03	
24	7	1	Sarah Katsoulis (AUS)	1:02.14	
25	6	2	Barbora Závadová (CZE)	1:02.55	
26	5	0	Fernanda González (MEX)	1:02.63	
27	6	0	Chan Kin Lok (HKG)	1:02.76	
28	5	8	Manuela Morano (ARG)	1:02.85	NR
29	6	8	Mandy Loots (RSA)	1:02.90	
29	7	0	Gizem Bozkurt (TUR)	1:02.90	
31	5	1	Flavia Cazziolato (BRA)	1:03.10	
32	6	9	Samantha Yeo (SIN)	1:03.58	NR
33	1	1	Chantal van Landeghem (CAN)	1:03.93	
34	5	7	Ceren Dilek (TUR)	1:04.14	
35	4	5	Sarah Rolko (LUX)	1:04.29	
36	6	7	Kelly Rasmussen (DEN)	1:04.30	
37	7	9	Kristina Krasyukova (RUS)	1:04.46	
38	4	4	Rene Warnes (RSA)	1:04.58	
39	4	0	Caroline Pickering Puamau (FIJ)	1:05.47	
40	4	6	Julie Meynen (LUX)	1:05.49	
41	4	3	Lynette Ng (SIN)	1:05.80	
42	4	7	Christine Briedenhann (NAM)	1:06.71	
43	1	7	Karen Torrez (BOL)	1:06.76	NR
44	3	5	Mariangel Hidalgo (CRC)	1:07.09	
45	4	2	Miriam Corsini (MOZ)	1:07.63	
46	4	1	Zabrina Holder (BAR)	1:07.69	
47	3	4	Kuan Weng I (MAC)	1:07.85	
48	4	9	Tan Chi Yan (MAC)	1:08.08	
49	4	8	Dalia Tórrez Zamora (NCA)	1:08.39	
50	3	8	Barbara Vali-Skelton (PNG)	1:09.22	
51	3	3	Pooja Raghava Alva (IND)	1:09.48	
52	3	1	Tegan McCarthy (PNG)	1:09.69	
53	3	2	Lianna Catherine Swan (PAK)	1:09.89	
54	3	0	Monica Saili (SAM)	1:11.26	
55	3	9	Patricia Cani (ALB)	1:11.75	
56	2	2	Domoinanavalona Amboaratiana (MAD)	1:11.93	
57	3	7	Fabiola Espinoza Herrera (NCA)	1:12.00	
58	3	6	Aurelie Fanchette (SEY)	1:13.23	
59	2	1	Athena Gaskin (GUY)	1:16.70	
60	2	4	Ann-Marie Hepler (MHL)	1:17.75	
61	2	0	Bonita Imsirovic (BOT)	1:18.18	
62	2	5	Danielle Atoigue (GUM)	1:20.52	
63	2	6	Angela Kendrick (MHL)	1:21.68	
64	2	3	Shne Joachim (VIN)	1:21.98	
	2	9	Adzo Kpossi (TOG)	DSQ	
	1	2	Mercedes Toledo (VEN)	DNS	
	1	6	Ophelia Swayne (GHA)	DNS	
	5	2	Wendy van der Zanden (NED)	DNS	

=== Semifinals ===
Rank	Heat	Lane	Name	Nationality	Time	Notes
1	2	1	Alia Atkinson	Jamaica	58.94	Q, NR
2	2	2	Zhao Jing	China	59.12	Q
3	1	4	Rūta Meilutytė	Lithuania	59.15	Q, NR
4	2	5	Katinka Hosszú	Hungary	59.17	Q
5	1	6	Aleksandra Gerasimenya	Belarus	59.29	Q, NR
6	2	4	Sophie Allen	United Kingdom	59.58	Q
7	2	3	Zsuzsanna Jakabos	Hungary	59.68	Q
8	2	6	Theresa Michalak	Germany	59.81	Q
9	1	3	Melanie Margalis	United States	1:00.12	
10	1	5	Kanako Watanabe	Japan	1:00.16	
11	1	2	Chen Xinyi	China	1:00.22	
12	1	7	Emu Higuchi	Japan	1:00.51	
13	1	1	Emilia Pikkarainen	Finland	1:00.55	
14	2	8	Alicja Tchórz	Poland	1:00.93	
15	1	8	Madeline Dirado	United States	1:01.07	
16	2	7	Hanna-Maria Seppälä	Finland	1:01.98	

=== Final ===
The final was held at 20:52.

Rank	Lane	Name	Nationality	Time	Notes
1st place, gold medalist(s)	6	Katinka Hosszú	Hungary	58.49	CR
2nd place, silver medalist(s)	3	Rūta Meilutytė	Lithuania	58.79	NR
3rd place, bronze medalist(s)	5	Zhao Jing	China	58.80	
4	4	Alia Atkinson	Jamaica	58.85	NR
5	2	Aleksandra Gerasimenya	Belarus	58.94	NR
6	7	Sophie Allen	United Kingdom	59.03	
7	1	Zsuzsanna Jakabos	Hungary	59.41	
8	8	Theresa Michalak	Germany	59.68	
