= 2012 FINA World Swimming Championships (25 m) – Women's 50 metre breaststroke =

Women's 50m Breaststroke at the 2012 Short Course Worlds
- Dates: 12 December (heats and semifinals); 13 December (final)
- Winning time: 29.44

Medalists
gold medal	Rūta Meilutytė	Lithuania
silver medal	Alia Atkinson	Jamaica
bronze medal	Sarah Katsoulis	Australia

The women's 50 metre breaststroke event at the 11th FINA World Swimming Championships (25m) took place 12–13 December 2012 at the Sinan Erdem Dome.

== Records ==
Prior to this competition, the existing world and championship records were as follows.

	Name	Nation	Time	Location	Date
World record	Jessica Hardy	United States	28.80	Berlin	15 November 2009
Championship record	Jessica Hardy	United States	29.58	Manchester	10 April 2008

The following records were established during the competition:

Date	Event	Name	Nation	Time	Record
12 December	Heats	Rūta Meilutytė	Lithuania	29.56	CR
12 December	Semifinals	Rūta Meilutytė	Lithuania	29.51	CR
13 December	Final	Rūta Meilutytė	Lithuania	29.44	CR

== Results ==
=== Heats ===
Rank	Heat	Lane	Name	Time	Notes
1	6	4	Rūta Meilutytė (LTU)	29.56	Q, CR, NR
2	8	4	Alia Atkinson (JAM)	29.72	Q,NR
3	6	5	Jessica Hardy (USA)	29.74	Q
4	8	5	Petra Chocová (CZE)	30.13	Q
5	6	3	Sarah Katsoulis (AUS)	30.24	Q
6	7	3	Rikke Møller Pedersen (DEN)	30.25	Q
7	7	4	Rebecca Ejdervik (SWE)	30.26	Q
8	8	3	Jennie Johansson (SWE)	30.34	Q
9	7	5	Valentina Artemyeva (RUS)	30.34	Q
10	6	8	Ellyn Baumgardner (USA)	30.81	Q
11	7	6	Samantha Marshall (AUS)	30.90	Q
11	8	6	Beatriz Travalon (BRA)	30.90	Q
13	8	2	Jenna Laukkanen (FIN)	30.95	Q
14	6	6	Tera van Beilen (CAN)	30.98	Q
15	6	7	Zhao Jin (CHN)	31.01	Q
16	2	6	Ji Liping (CHN)	31.08	Q
17	2	8	Hrafnhildur Lúthersdóttir (ISL)	31.17	
17	6	2	Dilara Buse Günaydın (TUR)	31.17	NR
17	8	7	Martha McCabe (CAN)	31.17	
20	7	7	Kelly Rasmussen (DEN)	31.38	
21	7	1	Fumiko Kawanabe (JPN)	31.42	
22	7	0	Kanako Watanabe (JPN)	31.52	
23	2	4	Hanna Dzerkal (UKR)	31.62	
24	8	8	Chiara Boggiatto (ITA)	31.70	
25	6	0	Vitalina Simonova (RUS)	31.82	
26	6	1	Julia Sebastian (ARG)	31.87	
27	8	9	Chen I-Chuan (TPE)	31.90	
28	8	1	Fanny Babou (FRA)	31.93	
29	5	3	Raminta Dvariškytė (LTU)	32.04	
30	5	4	Miriam Corsini (MOZ)	32.05	
31	8	0	Hannah Miley (GBR)	32.30	
32	7	8	Ceren Dilek (TUR)	32.47	
33	6	9	Samantha Yeo (SIN)	32.63	NR
34	7	9	Lei On Kei (MAC)	32.76	
35	5	5	Dariya Talanova (KGZ)	33.04	
36	2	2	Jin Hui Sin (PRK)	33.17	
37	5	6	Isabel Riquelme (CHI)	33.24	
38	5	0	Barbara Vali-Skelton (PNG)	33.79	
39	4	5	Tegan McCarthy (PNG)	34.45	
40	5	7	Oreoluwa Cherebin (GRN)	34.68	
41	5	9	Michaela Millo (MLT)	34.78	
42	2	1	Kum Jong Ho (PRK)	34.96	
43	4	4	Dalia Tórrez Zamora (NCA)	35.17	
44	5	2	Rachael Tonjor (NGR)	35.35	
45	5	1	Jaywant Arcot Vijaykumar (IND)	35.36	
46	4	8	Patricia Cani (ALB)	36.36	
47	4	2	Monica Saili (SAM)	36.57	
48	3	4	Bonita Imisirovic (BOT)	36.68	
49	4	7	Shne Joachim (VIN)	36.69	
50	2	5	Thet Ei Ei (MYA)	36.76	
50	4	6	Lianna Catherine Swan (PAK)	36.76	
52	4	9	Deandra van der Colff (BOT)	37.61	
53	2	3	Mariam Foum (TAN)	37.81	
54	3	6	Keyik Valiyeva (TKM)	37.91	
55	3	5	Athena Gaskin (GUY)	38.78	
56	3	2	Aurelie Fanchette (SEY)	39.22	
57	3	8	Angela Kendrick (MHL)	40.37	
58	4	1	Ann-Marie Hepler (MHL)	40.50	
59	3	1	Charissa Sofia Panuve (TGA)	42.03	
60	3	7	Danielle Aoigue (GUM)	42.70	
61	2	7	Ramata Keita (GUI)	1:01.60	
	1	3	Mercedes Toledo (VEN)	DNS	
	1	4	Fatoumata Samassékou (MLI)	DNS	
	1	5	Ingrid Bethel Raissa Sanon (BUR)	DNS	
	2	0	Angelika Ouedraogo (BUR)	DNS	
	3	0	Nazlati Mohamed Andhumdine (COM)	DNS	
	3	3	Ophelia Swayne (GHA)	DNS	
	3	9	Ramata Coulibaly (MLI)	DNS	
	4	0	Kokoe Vanessa Ahyee (CIV)	DNS	
	4	3	Elodie Poo Cheong (MRI)	DNS	
	5	8	Kibong Tanji (CMR)	DNS	
	7	2	Martina Moravčíková (CZE)	DNS	

==== Swim-off ====
Rank	Lane	Name	Time	Notes
17	2	Dilara Buse Günaydın (TUR)	31.06	NR
18	8	Hrafnhildur Lúthersdóttir (ISL)	31.12	
19	3	Martha McCabe (CAN)	31.16	

=== Semifinals ===
Rank	Heat	Lane	Name	Nationality	Time	Notes
1	2	4	Rūta Meilutytė	Lithuania	29.51	Q, CR, ER
2	1	4	Alia Atkinson	Jamaica	29.62	Q, NR
3	2	5	Jessica Hardy	United States	29.82	Q
4	1	5	Petra Chocová	Czech Republic	30.05	Q
5	1	3	Rikke Møller Pedersen	Denmark	30.19	Q, NR
5	2	3	Sarah Katsoulis	Australia	30.19	Q
7	2	6	Rebecca Ejdervik	Sweden	30.25	Q
8	2	8	Zhao Jin	China	30.33	Q
9	1	6	Jennie Johansson	Sweden	30.41	
10	1	2	Ellyn Baumgardner	United States	30.47	
11	2	2	Valentina Artemyeva	Russia	30.65	
11	2	7	Samantha Marshall	Australia	30.65	
13	1	7	Beatriz Travalon	Brazil	30.84	
14	1	8	Ji Liping	China	30.88	
15	2	1	Jenna Laukkanen	Finland	30.90	
16	1	1	Tera van Beilen	Canada	30.99	

=== Final ===
Rank	Lane	Name	Nationality	Time	Notes
1st place, gold medalist(s)	4	Rūta Meilutytė	Lithuania	29.44	CR, ER
2nd place, silver medalist(s)	5	Alia Atkinson	Jamaica	29.67	
3rd place, bronze medalist(s)	7	Sarah Katsoulis	Australia	29.94	
4	2	Rikke Møller Pedersen	Denmark	30.00	NR
5	3	Jessica Hardy	United States	30.01	
6	6	Petra Chocová	Czech Republic	30.10	
7	1	Rebecca Ejdervik	Sweden	30.12	
8	8	Zhao Jin	China	30.43	
