= Samoa at the 2013 World Aquatics Championships =

- Flag of Samoa
- World Aquatics code: SAM
- National federation: Samoa Swimming Federation

in Barcelona, Spain
- Competitors: 3 in 1 sports
- Medals: Gold 0 Silver 0 Bronze 0 Total 0

World Aquatics Championships appearances
- 2005; 2007; 2009; 2011; 2013; 2015; 2017; 2019; 2022; 2023; 2024; 2025

Samoa competed at the 2013 World Aquatics Championships in Barcelona, Spain between 19 July and 4 August 2013.

== Swimming ==
Samoan swimmers achieved qualifying standards in the following events (up to a maximum of 2 swimmers in each event at the A-standard entry time, and 1 at the B-standard):

Men

Athlete	Event	Heat		Final	
Athlete	Event	Time	Rank	Time	Rank
Brandon Schuster	400 m freestyle	4:29.60	47	did not advance	
Brandon Schuster	800 m freestyle	9:27.45	34	did not advance	

Women

Athlete	Event	Heat		Semifinal		Final	
Athlete	Event	Time	Rank	Time	Rank	Time	Rank
Evelina Afoa	50 m backstroke	31.67	45	did not advance			
Evelina Afoa	100 m backstroke	1:09.11	43	did not advance			
Monica Saili	400 m freestyle	4:55.49	36	—N/a		did not advance	
Monica Saili	800 m freestyle	10:11.46	37	—N/a		did not advance	
