= Evelina Afoa =

Samoan swimmer (born 1998)

Personal information
- Born: September 13, 1998 (age 27) Wellington, New Zealand

Sport
- Sport: Swimming
- Strokes: Backstroke, butterfly, freestyle

Evelina Afoa (born 13 September 1998) is a Samoan swimmer, who represented Samoa at the 2016 Summer Olympics. She holds several Samoan records in swimming.

== Personal life ==
Afoa was born in 1998 in Wellington, New Zealand. She attended Brisbane State High School.

== Swimming career ==
=== 2013 ===
Afoa represented Samoa at the 2013 World Aquatics Championships, competing in the 50m and 100 metre backstroke events.

=== 2014 ===
She competed for Samoa at the 2014 Commonwealth Games, racing in the 50 metre freestyle, the 50m and 100 metre backstroke, and the 50 metre butterfly.

At the 2014 FINA World Swimming Championships (25 m), Afoa competed in the 50m freestyle, the 50m and 100m backstroke, and the 50 metre butterfly.

=== 2015 ===
She represented Samoa at the 2015 World Aquatics Championships, racing in the 50m and 100 metre backstroke.

=== 2016 ===
Afoa raced at the 2016 Oceania Swimming Championships.

She competed at the 2016 Summer Olympics, racing in a heat of the 100 metre backstroke.
