= Deandra van der Colff =

Botswanan swimmer (born 1993)

Personal information
- Born: May 31, 1993 (age 33) Bulawayo, Zimbabwe

Sport
- Sport: Swimming
- Strokes: Butterfly, freestyle

Deandra van der Colff (born 31 May 1993) is a Zimbabwean-born Botswanan swimmer.

She competed in the 50 m freestyle and 50 m butterfly events at the 2011 World Aquatics Championships and in the 50 m freestyle, 50 m breaststroke and 50 m butterfly events at the 2012 FINA World Swimming Championships (25 m). Van der Colff also competed in the 50 m and 50 m butterfly events at the 2013 World Aquatics Championships.

she began her swimming journey at a young age, honing her skills and building a foundation for her international career.Deandra van der Colff's career is marked by impressive milestones that highlight her dedication and talent.Competing in various international events, she has consistently pushed the boundaries of her capabilities, representing Botswana with pride.Deandra's journey also led her to the 2012 FINA World Swimming Championships (25 m), where she competed in multiple events, including the 50 m freestyle, 50 m breaststroke, and 50 m butterfly. This competition was another platform for her to showcase her talent and further establish her reputation in the swimming community.
