= 2012 FINA World Swimming Championships (25 m) – Women's 100 metre breaststroke =

Women's 100m Breaststroke at the 2012 Short Course Worlds
- Dates: 14 December (heats and semifinals); 15 December (final)
- Winning time: 1:03.52

Medalists
gold medal	Rūta Meilutytė	Lithuania
silver medal	Alia Atkinson	Jamaica
bronze medal	Rikke Møller Pedersen	Denmark

The women's 100 metre breaststroke event at the 11th FINA World Swimming Championships (25m) took place 14 – 15 December 2012 at the Sinan Erdem Dome.

== Records ==
Prior to this competition, the existing world and championship records were as follows.

	Name	Nation	Time	Location	Date
World record	Rebecca Soni	United States	1:02.70	Manchester	19 December 2009
Championship record	Rebecca Soni	United States	1:03.98	Dubai	18 December 2010

The following records were established during the competition:

Date	Event	Name	Nation	Time	Record
15 December	Final	Rūta Meilutytė	Lithuania	1:03.52	CR

== Results ==
=== Heats ===
Rank	Heat	Lane	Name	Time	Notes
1	7	5	Rūta Meilutytė (LTU)	1:04.69	Q, NR
2	6	4	Rikke Møller Pedersen (DEN)	1:04.73	Q
3	6	5	Sarah Katsoulis (AUS)	1:04.76	Q
4	7	4	Jessica Hardy (USA)	1:05.04	Q
5	5	4	Alia Atkinson (JAM)	1:05.26	Q
6	5	5	Jennie Johansson (SWE)	1:06.10	Q
7	6	3	Petra Chocová (CZE)	1:06.16	Q
8	5	6	Samantha Marshall (AUS)	1:06.32	Q
9	6	6	Rebecca Ejdervik (SWE)	1:06.45	Q
10	6	7	Dilara Buse Günaydın (TUR)	1:06.61	Q, NR
11	7	6	Tera van Beilen (CAN)	1:06.74	Q
12	7	3	Valentina Artemyeva (RUS)	1:06.75	Q
13	7	2	Jenna Laukkanen (FIN)	1:06.90	Q
14	2	1	Ji Liping (CHN)	1:06.92	Q
15	5	7	Sophie Allen (GBR)	1:06.93	Q
16	6	0	Zhao Jin (CHN)	1:06.98	Q
17	7	7	Maria Temnikova (RUS)	1:07.10	
17	7	1	Ellyn Baumgardner (USA)	1:07.10	
19	5	2	Martha McCabe (CAN)	1:07.12	
20	5	3	Marina García Urzainqui (ESP)	1:07.15	
21	5	8	Miku Kanasashi (JPN)	1:07.49	
22	1	5	Hrafnhildur Lúthersdóttir (ISL)	1:07.54	
23	6	2	Fumiko Kawanabe (JPN)	1:07.60	
24	7	8	Martina Moravčíková (CZE)	1:07.85	
25	4	4	Raminta Dvariškytė (LTU)	1:07.97	
26	5	0	Back Su-Yeon (KOR)	1:08.03	
27	5	1	Chiara Boggiatto (ITA)	1:08.17	
28	6	1	Beatriz Travalon (BRA)	1:08.21	
29	4	6	Hannah Miley (GBR)	1:08.68	
30	7	0	Julia Sebastian (ARG)	1:09.21	
31	4	5	Samantha Yeo (SIN)	1:09.28	NR
32	6	9	Alona Ribakova (LAT)	1:09.29	NR
33	6	8	Fanny Babou (FRA)	1:09.34	
34	4	3	Chen I-Chuan (TPE)	1:10.12	
35	5	9	Ceren Dilek (TUR)	1:10.91	
36	4	7	Dariya Talanova (KGZ)	1:10.96	
37	4	9	Miriam Corsini (MOZ)	1:11.73	
38	4	1	Isabel Riquelme (CHI)	1:12.43	
39	2	8	Jin Hui Sin (PRK)	1:12.47	
40	4	2	Lei On Kei (MAC)	1:12.92	
41	4	0	Daniela Lindemeier (NAM)	1:13.23	NR
42	3	3	Barbara Vali-Skelton (PNG)	1:13.73	
43	3	2	Michaela Millo (MLT)	1:15.70	
44	3	1	Tegan McCarthy (PNG)	1:16.02	
45	1	4	Kum Jong Ho (PRK)	1:17.24	
46	3	7	Oreoluwa Cherebin (GRN)	1:17.40	
47	3	6	Lianna Catherine Swan (PAK)	1:18.62	
48	3	8	Rachael Tonjor (NGR)	1:18.74	
49	3	9	Patricia Cani (ALB)	1:19.04	
50	3	5	Jaywant Arcot Vijaykumar (IND)	1:20.10	
51	2	4	Monica Saili (SAM)	1:20.66	
52	4	8	Bonita Imisirovic (BOT)	1:20.76	
53	3	0	Anum Bandey (PAK)	1:20.97	
54	2	7	Domoinanavalona Amboaratiana (MAD)	1:21.78	
55	2	6	Keyik Valiyeva (TKM)	1:24.79	
56	2	3	Shne Joachim (VIN)	1:24.86	
57	2	5	Athena Gaskin (GUY)	1:24.94	
58	2	2	Danielle Aoigue (GUM)	1:33.26	
59	2	0	Angela Kendrick (MHL)	1:35.71	
	1	3	Mercedes Toledo (VEN)	DNS	
	3	4	Elodie Poo Cheong (MRI)	DNS	
	7	9	Kelly Rasmussenn (DEN)	DNS	

==== Swim-off ====
Rank	Lane	Name	Time	Notes
1	4	Maria Temnikova (RUS)	1:06.20	
2	5	Ellyn Baumgardner (USA)	1:06.99	

=== Semifinals ===
Rank	Heat	Lane	Name	Nationality	Time	Notes
1	1	4	Rikke Møller Pedersen	Denmark	1:04.11	Q, NR
2	2	4	Rūta Meilutytė	Lithuania	1:04.81	Q
3	2	3	Alia Atkinson	Jamaica	1:04.99	Q
4	2	5	Sarah Katsoulis	Australia	1:05.12	Q
5	1	5	Jessica Hardy	United States	1:05.42	Q
6	1	3	Jennie Johansson	Sweden	1:05.62	Q
7	2	6	Petra Chocová	Czech Republic	1:05.68	Q
8	2	2	Rebecca Ejdervik	Sweden	1:06.18	Q
9	2	7	Tera van Beilen	Canada	1:06.24	
10	2	8	Sophie Allen	United Kingdom	1:06.42	
11	1	6	Samantha Marshall	Australia	1:06.48	
12	2	1	Jenna Laukkanen	Finland	1:06.75	
13	1	7	Valentina Artemyeva	Russia	1:06.94	
14	1	1	Ji Liping	China	1:07.25	
15	1	2	Dilara Buse Günaydın	Turkey	1:07.27	
	1	8	Zhao Jin	China	DSQ	

=== Final ===
The final was held at 19:00.

Rank	Lane	Name	Nationality	Time	Notes
1st place, gold medalist(s)	5	Rūta Meilutytė	Lithuania	1:03.52	CR, ER
2nd place, silver medalist(s)	3	Alia Atkinson	Jamaica	1:03.80	NR
3rd place, bronze medalist(s)	4	Rikke Møller Pedersen	Denmark	1:04.05	NR
4	6	Sarah Katsoulis	Australia	1:05.01	
5	2	Jessica Hardy	United States	1:05.08	
6	7	Jennie Johansson	Sweden	1:05.62	
7	8	Rebecca Ejdervik	Sweden	1:06.07	
8	1	Petra Chocová	Czech Republic	1:06.12	
