= Domingas Munhemeze =

Mozambican swimmer

Personal information
- Born: 28 May 2002 (age 24)

Sport
- Sport: Swimming

Domingas Munhemeze (born 28 May 2002) is a Mozambican swimmer.

In 2019, she represented Mozambique at the 2019 World Aquatics Championships in Gwangju, South Korea. She competed in the women's 50 metre freestyle event. She did not advance to compete in the semi-finals. She also competed in the women's 50 metre butterfly event; in this event, she did not advance to compete in the semi-finals.
