= 2012 FINA World Swimming Championships (25 m) – Women's 200 metre freestyle =

Women's 200m Freestyle at the 2012 Short Course Worlds
- Dates: 16 December (heats and final)
- Winning time: 1:53.59

Medalists
gold medal	Allison Schmitt	United States
silver medal	Katinka Hosszú	Hungary
bronze medal	Melanie Costa	Spain

The women's 200 metre freestyle event at the 11th FINA World Swimming Championships (25m) took place 16 December 2012 at the Sinan Erdem Dome.

== Records ==
Prior to this competition, the existing world and championship records were as follows.

	Name	Nation	Time	Location	Date
World record	Federica Pellegrini	Italy	1:51.17	Istanbul	13 December 2009
Championship record	Camille Muffat	France	1:52.29	Dubai	19 December 2010

No new records were set during this competition.

== Results ==
=== Heats ===
Rank	Heat	Lane	Name	Time	Notes
1	6	5	Zsuzsanna Jakabos (HUN)	1:55.24	Q
2	6	4	Veronika Popova (RUS)	1:55.28	Q
3	6	7	Haruka Ueda (JPN)	1:55.32	Q
4	7	7	Lauren Boyle (NZL)	1:55.40	Q, NR
5	7	5	Melanie Costa (ESP)	1:55.42	Q
6	8	4	Katinka Hosszú (HUN)	1:55.52	Q
7	7	4	Allison Schmitt (USA)	1:55.77	Q
8	8	5	Angie Bainbridge (AUS)	1:56.09	Q
9	7	2	Lotte Friis (DEN)	1:56.17	
10	7	3	Mie Nielsen (DEN)	1:56.36	
11	8	3	Rebecca Turner (GBR)	1:56.46	
12	8	2	Guo Junjun (CHN)	1:56.51	
13	1	8	Pang Jiaying (CHN)	1:57.25	
14	6	6	Daryna Zevina (UKR)	1:57.33	
15	8	8	Melissa Ingram (NZL)	1:57.38	
16	6	3	Nina Rangelova (BUL)	1:57.49	
17	6	1	Megan Romano (USA)	1:57.87	
18	5	3	Alice Mizzau (ITA)	1:57.89	
19	7	6	Michelle Coleman (SWE)	1:58.03	
20	8	7	Sze Hang Yu (HKG)	1:58.06	
21	7	0	Sharon van Rouwendaal (NED)	1:58.38	
22	5	6	Ellie Faulkner (GBR)	1:58.69	
23	8	1	Heather MacLean (CAN)	1:58.80	
24	6	8	Diletta Carli (ITA)	1:58.81	
25	8	6	Daria Belyakina (RUS)	1:58.99	
26	7	8	Ellen Fullerton (AUS)	1:59.27	
27	5	1	Miki Uchida (JPN)	1:59.38	
28	5	8	Jördis Steinegger (AUT)	1:59.39	
29	6	9	Mojca Sagmeister (SLO)	1:59.44	
30	5	0	Yang Chin-Kuei (TPE)	1:59.46	
31	6	0	Erika Villaécija García (ESP)	1:59.66	
32	5	2	Barbora Závadová (CZE)	1:59.67	
33	5	4	Julia Hassler (LIE)	1:59.70	
34	7	1	Urša Bežan (SLO)	1:59.81	
35	4	2	Jessica Camposano (COL)	1:59.86	NR
36	4	4	Kyna Pereira (RSA)	2:00.26	
37	4	5	Rene Warnes (RSA)	2:01.09	
38	7	9	Larissa Oliveira (BRA)	2:01.22	
39	3	3	Samantha Arévalo (ECU)	2:01.49	NR
40	1	7	Elmira Aigaliyeva (KAZ)	2:01.88	
41	5	9	Fernanda González (MEX)	2:02.05	
42	8	0	Danielle Villars (SUI)	2:02.12	
43	4	3	Gizem Bozkurt (TUR)	2:02.18	
44	8	9	Ranohon Amanova (UZB)	2:02.35	
45	4	6	Julie Meynen (LUX)	2:02.44	
46	5	7	Amanda Lim (SIN)	2:03.32	
47	4	7	Andrea Cedrón (PER)	2:04.79	
48	3	5	Maria Gabriela Santis Mejia (GUA)	2:04.99	
49	2	5	Moira Fraser (ZIM)	2:05.10	
49	3	7	Karen Torrez (BOL)	2:05.10	NR
51	3	4	Allyson Roxanne Ponson (ARU)	2:06.07	
52	3	2	Anastasia Bogdanovski (MKD)	2:06.18	
53	1	1	Lani Cabrera (BAR)	2:06.34	NR
54	4	0	Maria Lopez Nery Huerta (PAR)	2:06.75	
55	3	8	Angie Galdamez (HON)	2:08.18	
56	4	9	Machiko Suharmee Raheem (SRI)	2:08.73	
57	3	6	Nicola Muscat (MLT)	2:10.58	NR
58	4	1	Jessica Cattaneo (PER)	2:10.75	
59	3	9	Sariyah Sherry (BAR)	2:11.08	
60	3	1	Olivia Planteau de Maroussem (MRI)	2:11.11	
61	2	4	Nathalie Sanchez Hernandez (ESA)	2:11.44	
62	4	8	Vong Erica Man Wai (MAC)	2:11.46	
63	2	3	Tieri Erasito (FIJ)	2:12.44	
64	2	6	Monica Saili (SAM)	2:12.65	
65	2	7	Judith Ilan Meauri (PNG)	2:15.50	
66	2	1	Field Anita Zahra (KEN)	2:16.03	NR
67	2	2	Fabiola Espinoza Herrera (NCA)	2:16.62	
68	3	0	Yusra Mardini (SYR)	2:19.10	
69	2	8	Aurelie Fanchette (SEY)	2:19.13	
70	2	0	Victoria Chentsova (NMI)	2:20.00	
71	1	6	Felicity Passon (SEY)	2:21.96	
72	1	5	Danielle Atoigue (GUM)	2:23.99	
73	2	9	Athena Gaskin (GUY)	2:27.00	
74	1	2	Charissa Sofia Panuve (TGA)	2:27.51	
75	1	4	Amanda Poppe (GUM)	2:28.58	
76	1	3	Mahnoor Maqsood (PAK)	2:36.23	
	5	5	Burcu Dolunay (TUR)	DNS	
	6	2	Louise Hansson (SWE)	DNS	

=== Final ===
The final was held at 21:03.

Rank	Lane	Name	Nationality	Time	Notes
1st place, gold medalist(s)	1	Allison Schmitt	United States	1:53.59	
2nd place, silver medalist(s)	7	Katinka Hosszú	Hungary	1:54.31	
3rd place, bronze medalist(s)	2	Melanie Costa	Spain	1:54.45	
4	8	Angie Bainbridge	Australia	1:54.66	
5	5	Veronika Popova	Russia	1:54.68	
6	3	Haruka Ueda	Japan	1:55.05	
7	4	Zsuzsanna Jakabos	Hungary	1:55.13	
8	6	Lauren Boyle	New Zealand	1:57.27	
