= Mozambique at the 2011 World Aquatics Championships =

- Flag of Mozambique
- FINA code: MOZ
- National federation: Federação Moçambicana de Natação

in Shanghai, China
- Competitors: 3 in 1 sport
- Medals: Gold 0 Silver 0 Bronze 0 Total 0

World Aquatics Championships appearances
- 1973; 1975; 1978; 1982; 1986; 1991; 1994; 1998; 2001; 2003; 2005; 2007; 2009; 2011; 2013; 2015; 2017; 2019; 2022; 2023; 2024

Mozambique competed at the 2011 World Aquatics Championships in Shanghai, China between July 16 and 31, 2011.

== Swimming ==
Mozambique qualified 3 swimmers.

Men

| Athlete | Event | Heats | | Semifinals | | Final | |
| Athlete | Event | Time | Rank | Time | Rank | Time | Rank |
|---|---|---|---|---|---|---|---|
| Chakyl Camal | Men's 50m Freestyle | 24.40 | 53 | did not advance | | | |
| Chakyl Camal | Men's 100m Freestyle | 54.99 | 74 | did not advance | | | |

Women

| Athlete | Event | Heats | | Semifinals | | Final | |
| Athlete | Event | Time | Rank | Time | Rank | Time | Rank |
|---|---|---|---|---|---|---|---|
| Jessica Vieira | Women's 50m Freestyle | 27.11 | 40 | did not advance | | | |
| Jessica Vieira | Women's 100m Freestyle | 1:00.14 | 52 | did not advance | | | |
| Jessika Cossa | Women's 50m Backstroke | 32.29 | 47 | did not advance | | | |
| Jessika Cossa | Women's 100m Backstroke | 1:09.74 | 52 | did not advance | | | |
