= 2012 FINA World Swimming Championships (25 m) – Women's 50 metre backstroke =

Event in the 11th FINA World Swimming Championships

Women's 50m Backstroke at the 2012 Short Course Worlds
- Dates: 15 December (heats and semifinals); 16 December (final)
- Winning time: 25.95

Medalists
gold medal	Zhao Jing	China
silver medal	Olivia Smoliga	United States
bronze medal	Aleksandra Urbanczyk	Poland

The women's 50 metre backstroke event at the 11th FINA World Swimming Championships (25m) took place on15–16 December 2012 at the Sinan Erdem Dome.

== Records ==
Prior to this competition, the existing world and championship records were as follows.

	Name	Nation	Time	Location	Date
World record	Sanja Jovanović	Croatia	25.70	Istanbul	12 December 2009
Championship record	Zhao Jing	China	26.27	Dubai	19 December 2010

The following records were established during the competition:

Date	Event	Name	Nation	Time	Record
15 December	Semifinals	Zhao Jing	China	26.11	CR
16 December	Final	Zhao Jing	China	25.95	CR

== Results ==
=== Heats ===
Rank	Heat	Lane	Name	Time	Notes
1	1	7	Zhao Jing (CHN)	26.69	Q
2	1	6	Olivia Smoliga (USA)	26.75	Q, NR
3	7	4	Rachel Goh (AUS)	26.86	Q
4	5	5	Aleksandra Urbanczyk (POL)	26.95	Q
5	6	4	Simona Baumrtová (CZE)	27.01	Q
6	7	5	Georgia Davies (GBR)	27.07	Q
7	7	6	Grace Loh (AUS)	27.21	Q
8	1	3	Elizabeth Simmonds (GBR)	27.27	Q
9	6	5	Etiene Medeiros (BRA)	27.30	Q
10	7	3	Arianna Barbieri (ITA)	27.31	Q
11	6	3	Mie Nielsen (DEN)	27.36	Q
12	7	2	Zhou Yanxin (CHN)	27.45	Q
13	5	4	Sanja Jovanović (CRO)	27.48	Q
14	5	9	Carolina Colorado Henao (COL)	27.51	Q, NR
15	6	2	Fabíola Molina (BRA)	27.52	Q
16	6	6	Kira Toussaint (NED)	27.56	Q
17	5	3	Noriko Inada (JPN)	27.62	
18	7	1	Duane Da Rocha (ESP)	27.76	
19	6	8	Gizem Çam (TUR)	27.82	NR
20	5	1	Jessica Ashley-Cooper (RSA)	27.84	
21	4	5	Megan Romano (USA)	27.94	
22	5	2	Fabienne Nadarajah (AUT)	28.13	
23	7	7	Fernanda González (MEX)	28.29	
24	5	7	Polina Lapshina (RUS)	28.45	
25	6	0	Evelyn Verrasztó (HUN)	28.47	
26	5	6	Michelle Coleman (SWE)	28.51	
26	5	0	Birita Debes (FRO)	28.51	NR
28	6	1	Hazal Sarıkaya (TUR)	28.58	
29	7	0	Lynette Ng (SIN)	28.74	
30	1	5	Yekaterina Rudenko (KAZ)	29.00	
31	7	9	Sarah Rolko (LUX)	29.08	
32	4	3	Marie Kamimura (JPN)	29.16	
33	6	7	Theodora Drakou (GRE)	29.22	
34	4	4	Kätlin Sepp (EST)	29.43	
35	4	2	Araya Wongvat (THA)	29.47	
36	4	6	Vong Erica Man Wai (MAC)	29.53	
37	4	7	Caroline Pickering Puamau (FIJ)	29.55	
38	5	8	Nguyen Thi Anh Vien (VIE)	29.68	
39	3	5	Mónica Ramírez (AND)	30.54	
40	3	4	Jade Howard (ZAM)	30.64	
41	4	9	Dalia Tórrez Zamora (NCA)	30.88	
42	4	0	Anahit Barseghyan (ARM)	30.93	NR
43	4	1	Kuan Weng I (MAC)	31.01	
44	3	6	Field Anita Zahra (KEN)	31.04	NR
45	3	8	Naomi Ruele (BOT)	31.22	
46	4	8	Yessy Yosaputra (INA)	31.29	
47	3	3	Lanoe Talisa Erwan (KEN)	31.32	
48	3	2	Kiran Khan (PAK)	31.89	NR
49	3	7	Nur Hamizah Ahmad (BRU)	32.02	NR
50	3	1	Tegan McCarthy (PNG)	32.27	
51	2	8	Estellah Fils Rabetsara (MAD)	32.51	
52	2	9	K. Zin Win (MYA)	33.20	
53	2	3	Patricia Cani (ALB)	33.52	
54	3	9	Monica Saili (SAM)	33.64	
55	3	0	Ann-Marie Hepler (MHL)	34.97	
56	2	5	Mahnoor Maqsood (PAK)	36.77	
57	2	7	Roylin Melatik Akiwo (PLW)	37.33	
58	2	6	Shne Joachim (VIN)	37.74	
59	2	2	Angela Kendrick (MHL)	38.02	
60	2	1	Sara Al Flaij (BHR)	40.94	
	2	0	Mariam Foum (TAN)	DSQ	
	1	2	E. Torrellas Valecillos (VEN)	DNS	
	1	4	Jeserik Pinto (VEN)	DNS	
	2	4	Ophelia Swayne (GHA)	DNS	
	6	9	Karin Prinsloo (RSA)	DNS	
	7	8	Chantal van Landeghem (CAN)	DNS	

=== Semifinals ===
16 swimmers participated in 2 heats.

Rank	Heat	Lane	Name	Nationality	Time	Notes
1	2	4	Zhao Jing	China	26.11	Q, CR
2	1	5	Aleksandra Urbanczyk	Poland	26.56	Q, NR
3	1	4	Olivia Smoliga	United States	26.57	Q, NR
4	2	3	Simona Baumrtová	Czech Republic	26.68	Q, =NR
5	1	3	Georgia Davies	Great Britain	26.84	Q, NR
6	2	6	Grace Loh	Australia	26.85	Q
7	2	5	Rachel Goh	Australia	26.95	Q
8	2	8	Fabíola Molina	Brazil	27.01	Q
9	2	7	Mie Nielsen	Denmark	27.07	NR
10	2	2	Etiene Medeiros	Brazil	27.13	
11	1	6	Elizabeth Simmonds	Great Britain	27.28	
12	2	1	Sanja Jovanović	Croatia	27.31	
13	1	7	Zhou Yanxin	China	27.38	
14	1	2	Arianna Barbieri	Italy	27.42	
15	1	1	Carolina Colorado Henao	Colombia	27.45	NR
16	1	8	Kira Toussaint	Netherlands	27.61	

=== Final ===
The final was held at 19:06.

Rank	Lane	Name	Nationality	Time	Notes
1st place, gold medalist(s)	4	Zhao Jing	China	25.95	CR
2nd place, silver medalist(s)	3	Olivia Smoliga	United States	26.13	NR
3rd place, bronze medalist(s)	5	Aleksandra Urbanczyk	Poland	26.50	NR
4	2	Georgia Davies	United Kingdom	26.56	NR
5	6	Simona Baumrtová	Czech Republic	26.61	NR
6	1	Rachel Goh	Australia	26.91	
7	8	Fabíola Molina	Brazil	26.97	
8	7	Grace Loh	Australia	27.45	
