= Multidesportivo Sporting =

Pavilhão Multidesportivo Sporting
- Location: Lisbon, Portugal
- Owner: Sporting CP
- Capacity: +4000
- Type: Arena
- Events: Swimming; Table Tennis; Gymnastics; Shooting sports Combat sports

Construction
- Opened: 4 January 2004
- Renovated: 2015/16

Pavilhão Multidesportivo Sporting is a multi-sports arena located in Lisbon, part of the Estádio José Alvalade sports complex. It has four floors and it is the home of many Sporting CP sports.

== Organization ==
Every day, more than 4,000 athletes from various disciplines use the building, making it the main symbol of the club's eclecticism.

Spread over four floors, Pavilhão Multidesportivo Sporting features swimming pools, a shooting range, several gyms, sports halls and a team sports field.

Floor -1

- Swimming Pools: Swimming + Water Polo

Floor 0

- Sports Hall with seating for 50 spectators: Table Tennis
- Multifunctional Gyms
- Administrative Area

Floor 2

- Gymnastics Gyms: Acrobatics, Tumbling, Trampolining, Rhythmic Gymnastics, Artistic Gymnastics
- Combat Sports Gyms: Aikido, Boxing, Capoeira, Judo, Karate, Kickboxing, Krav Maga, Taekwondo
- Shooting Range: Shooting

Floor 3

- Training Field with seating for 150 spectators: Handball and Futsal
