= Mozambique at the 2024 World Aquatics Championships =

- Flag of Mozambique
- FINA code: MOZ
- National federation: Federação Moçambicana de Natação

in Doha, Qatar
- Competitors: 4 in 1 sport
- Medals: Gold 0 Silver 0 Bronze 0 Total 0

World Aquatics Championships appearances
- 1973; 1975; 1978; 1982; 1986; 1991; 1994; 1998; 2001; 2003; 2005; 2007; 2009; 2011; 2013; 2015; 2017; 2019; 2022; 2023; 2024

Mozambique competed at the 2024 World Aquatics Championships in Doha, Qatar from 2 to 18 February.

== Competitors ==
The following is the list of competitors in the Championships.

Sport	Men	Women	Total
Swimming	2	2	4
Total	2	2	4

== Swimming ==
Mozambique entered 4 swimmers.

Men

Athlete	Event	Heat		Semifinal		Final	
Athlete	Event	Time	Rank	Time	Rank	Time	Rank
Matthew Lawrence	50 metre breaststroke	29.01	41	Did not advance			
Matthew Lawrence	100 metre breaststroke	1:04.75	57	Did not advance			
Caio Lobo	200 metre breaststroke	2:29.27	34	Did not advance			
Caio Lobo	200 metre individual medley	2:15.55	37	Did not advance			

Women

Athlete	Event	Heat		Semifinal		Final	
Athlete	Event	Time	Rank	Time	Rank	Time	Rank
Denise Donelli	50 metre backstroke	32.21	47	Did not advance			
Denise Donelli	50 metre butterfly	30.69	46	Did not advance			
Alicia Mateus	50 metre freestyle	30.02	85	Did not advance			
Alicia Mateus	100 metre freestyle	1:05.53	70	Did not advance			
