= Samoa at the 2019 World Aquatics Championships =

- Flag of Samoa
- FINA code: SAM
- National federation: Samoa Swimming Federation

in Gwangju, South Korea
- Competitors: 4 in 1 sport
- Medals: Gold 0 Silver 0 Bronze 0 Total 0

World Aquatics Championships appearances
- 2005; 2007; 2009; 2011; 2013; 2015; 2017; 2019; 2022; 2023; 2024

Samoa competed at the 2019 World Aquatics Championships in Gwangju, South Korea from 12 to 28 July.

== Swimming ==
Samoa entered two swimmers.

Men

Athlete	Event	Heat		Semifinal		Final	
Athlete	Event	Time	Rank	Time	Rank	Time	Rank
Brandon Schuster	200 m individual medley	2:06.93	40	did not advance			
Brandon Schuster	400 m individual medley	4:29.84	32	—		did not advance	

Women

Athlete	Event	Heat		Semifinal		Final	
Athlete	Event	Time	Rank	Time	Rank	Time	Rank
Lushavel Stickland	50 m freestyle	26.77	44	did not advance			
Lushavel Stickland	100 m backstroke	1:05.22	48	did not advance			
