= Calvyn Justus =

South African swimmer (born 1995)

Personal information
- Full name: Calvyn Justus
- National team: South Africa
- Born: 14 December 1995 (age 30) Johannesburg, South Africa
- Height: 1.96 m (6 ft 5 in)

Sport
- Sport: Swimming
- Strokes: Freestyle
Medal record
Men's swimming
Representing South Africa
Commonwealth Games
Bronze medal – third place	2018 Gold Coast	4×100 m medley

Calvyn Justus (born 14 December 1995) is a South African swimmer. He represented South Africa in the men's 4 × 200 metre freestyle relay at the 2016 Summer Olympics. He is an alumnus of Westville Boys' High School. In 2018, Justus secured a bronze medal in the 4x100 medley relay at the Commonwealth Games, along with teammates Chad Le Clos, Cameron van der Burgh and Brad Tandy.
