= Mozambique at the 2015 World Aquatics Championships =

- Flag of Mozambique
- FINA code: MOZ
- National federation: Federação Moçambicana de Natação

in Kazan, Russia
- Competitors: 4 in 1 sport
- Medals: Gold 0 Silver 0 Bronze 0 Total 0

World Aquatics Championships appearances
- 1973; 1975; 1978; 1982; 1986; 1991; 1994; 1998; 2001; 2003; 2005; 2007; 2009; 2011; 2013; 2015; 2017; 2019; 2022; 2023; 2024

Mozambique competed at the 2015 World Aquatics Championships in Kazan, Russia from 24 July to 9 August 2015.

== Swimming ==
Mozambican swimmers have achieved qualifying standards in the following events (up to a maximum of 2 swimmers in each event at the A-standard entry time, and 1 at the B-standard):

Men

Athlete	Event	Heat		Semifinal		Final	
Athlete	Event	Time	Rank	Time	Rank	Time	Rank
Denílson da Costa	50 m freestyle	25.66	69	did not advance			
Igor Mogne	100 m freestyle	52.09	73	did not advance			
Igor Mogne	200 m freestyle	1:55.59	65	did not advance			

Women

Athlete	Event	Heat		Semifinal		Final	
Athlete	Event	Time	Rank	Time	Rank	Time	Rank
Jéssika Cossa	50 m backstroke	30.17	38	did not advance			
Jéssika Cossa	100 m backstroke	1:04.96	48	did not advance			
Jannah Sonnenschein	50 m butterfly	29.66	51	did not advance			
Jannah Sonnenschein	100 m butterfly	1:04.48	52	did not advance			

Mixed

Athlete	Event	Heat		Final	
Athlete	Event	Time	Rank	Time	Rank
Denílson da Costa; Jannah Sonnenschein; Jéssika Cossa; Igor Mogne	4 × 100 m freestyle relay	3:47.60	22	did not advance	
