= Swimming at the 2019 World Aquatics Championships – Women's 50 metre butterfly =

Women's 50 metre butterfly at the 2019 World Aquatics Championships
- Venue: Nambu University Municipal Aquatics Center
- Location: Gwangju, South Korea
- Dates: 26 July (heats and semifinals); 27 July (final)
- Competitors: 64 from 58 nations
- Winning time: 25.02

Medalists
gold medal	Sarah Sjöström	Sweden
silver medal	Ranomi Kromowidjojo	Netherlands
bronze medal	Farida Osman	Egypt

The Women's 50 metre butterfly competition at the 2019 World Championships was held on 26 and 27 July 2019.

== Records ==
Prior to the competition, the existing world and championship records were as follows.

World record	Sarah Sjöström (SWE)	24.43	Borås, Sweden	5 July 2014
Competition record	Sarah Sjöström (SWE)	24.60	Budapest, Hungary	29 July 2017

== Results ==
=== Heats ===
The heats were held on 26 July at 11:11.

Rank	Heat	Lane	Name	Nationality	Time	Notes
1	7	4	Sarah Sjöström	Sweden	25.39	Q
2	6	4	Kelsi Dahlia	United States	25.70	Q
3	5	4	Farida Osman	Egypt	25.71	Q
4	5	3	Penny Oleksiak	Canada	25.73	Q
5	7	5	Ranomi Kromowidjojo	Netherlands	25.86	Q
6	7	3	Louise Hansson	Sweden	25.97	Q
7	6	2	Elena Di Liddo	Italy	26.03	Q
8	7	6	Marie Wattel	France	26.07	Q
9	7	2	Jeanette Ottesen	Denmark	26.09	Q
10	6	6	Wang Yichun	China	26.13	Q
11	5	2	Maggie MacNeil	Canada	26.14	Q
11	6	1	Zhang Yufei	China	26.14	Q
11	7	0	Brianna Throssell	Australia	26.14	Q
14	5	5	Kimberly Buys	Belgium	26.23	Q
15	6	7	Anna Ntountounaki	Greece	26.26	Q
16	6	3	Arina Surkova	Russia	26.32	QSO
16	6	5	Emilie Beckmann	Denmark	26.32	QSO
18	5	6	Maaike de Waard	Netherlands	26.40	
19	7	1	Erin Gallagher	South Africa	26.45	
20	5	7	Mimosa Jallow	Finland	26.62	
21	5	1	Svetlana Chimrova	Russia	26.64	
22	6	8	Angelina Köhler	Germany	26.65	
23	4	5	Anastasia Gorbenko	Israel	26.70	
24	7	8	Park Ye-rin	South Korea	26.75	
25	5	9	Huang Mei-chien	Chinese Taipei	26.89	
25	7	7	Alexandra Touretski	Switzerland	26.89	
27	5	0	Quah Ting Wen	Singapore	26.92	
28	4	2	Jenjira Srisaard	Thailand	26.93	NR
29	6	0	Beatrix Bordás	Hungary	26.98	
30	6	9	Aleyna Özkan	Turkey	27.00	
31	4	4	Sirena Rowe	Colombia	27.02	
32	4	7	Paulina Nogaj	Poland	27.08	
33	4	3	Chan Kin Lok	Hong Kong	27.17	
34	4	6	Gabriela Ņikitina	Latvia	27.48	
34	7	9	Anicka Delgado	Ecuador	27.48	
36	5	8	Alia Atkinson	Jamaica	27.49	
37	4	1	Alexandra Schegoleva	Cyprus	27.74	
38	4	0	Maddy Moore	Bermuda	28.02	
39	1	3	Alexis Margett	Bolivia	28.21	
40	4	9	Maria Schutzmeier	Nicaragua	28.34	
41	4	8	Chade Nersicio	Curaçao	28.45	
42	3	3	Mikaili Charlemagne	Saint Lucia	29.24	
43	2	7	Varsenik Manucharyan	Armenia	29.65	
44	2	8	Sophia Diagne	Senegal	29.90	
45	3	1	Georgia-Leigh Vele	Papua New Guinea	30.07	
46	3	7	Aaliyah Palestrini	Seychelles	30.18	
47	3	6	Jamila Sanmoogan	Guyana	30.21	
48	3	4	Elodie Poo-cheong	Mauritius	30.26	
49	3	5	Aniqah Gaffoor	Sri Lanka	30.36	
50	3	2	Ann-Marie Hepler	Marshall Islands	30.77	
51	1	6	Enkhzul Khuyagbaatar	Mongolia	30.80	
52	3	8	Olivia Fuller	Antigua and Barbuda	30.88	
53	2	1	Dirngulbai Misech	Palau	31.14	
54	1	4	Taffi Illis	Sint Maarten	31.33	
55	2	5	Sofia Shah	Nepal	32.04	
56	2	2	Hemthon Vitiny	Cambodia	32.38	
57	2	0	Selina Katumba	Uganda	32.77	
58	3	0	Anastasiya Tyurina	Tajikistan	33.17	
59	1	5	Aika Watanabe	Northern Mariana Islands	33.43	
60	2	4	Dania Nour	Palestine	34.30	
61	3	9	Domingas Munhemeze	Mozambique	34.53	
62	2	9	Lucie Kouadio-Patinier	Ivory Coast	35.43	
63	2	3	Rahel Gebresilassie	Ethiopia	36.37	
64	2	6	Tity Dumbuya	Sierra Leone	37.90	

=== Swim-off ===
The swim-off was held on 26 July at 12:02.

Rank	Lane	Name	Nationality	Time	Notes
1	4	Arina Surkova	Russia	26.13	Q
2	5	Emilie Beckmann	Denmark	26.24	

=== Semifinals ===
The semifinals were held on 26 July at 21:09.

==== Semifinal 1 ====
Rank	Lane	Name	Nationality	Time	Notes
1	6	Marie Wattel	France	25.56	Q, NR
2	4	Kelsi Dahlia	United States	25.59	Q
3	5	Penny Oleksiak	Canada	25.93	Q
4	8	Arina Surkova	Russia	26.06	
5	3	Louise Hansson	Sweden	26.10	
6	7	Zhang Yufei	China	26.18	
7	2	Wang Yichun	China	26.21	
8	1	Kimberly Buys	Belgium	26.51	

==== Semifinal 2 ====
Rank	Lane	Name	Nationality	Time	Notes
1	4	Sarah Sjöström	Sweden	24.79	Q
2	3	Ranomi Kromowidjojo	Netherlands	25.54	Q
3	5	Farida Osman	Egypt	25.79	Q
4	1	Brianna Throssell	Australia	25.93	Q
5	2	Jeanette Ottesen	Denmark	26.01	Q
6	6	Elena Di Liddo	Italy	26.16	
7	7	Maggie MacNeil	Canada	26.28	
8	8	Anna Ntountounaki	Greece	26.31	

=== Final ===
The final was started on 27 July at 20:02.

Rank	Lane	Name	Nationality	Time	Notes
1st place, gold medalist(s)	4	Sarah Sjöström	Sweden	25.02	
2nd place, silver medalist(s)	5	Ranomi Kromowidjojo	Netherlands	25.35	
3rd place, bronze medalist(s)	2	Farida Osman	Egypt	25.47	
4	6	Kelsi Dahlia	United States	25.48	=AM
5	3	Marie Wattel	France	25.50	NR
6	7	Penny Oleksiak	Canada	25.69	
7	8	Jeanette Ottesen	Denmark	25.76	
8	1	Brianna Throssell	Australia	26.11	
