= Mozambique at the 2019 World Aquatics Championships =

- Flag of Mozambique
- FINA code: MOZ
- National federation: Federação Moçambicana de Natação

in Gwangju, South Korea
- Competitors: 3 in 1 sport
- Medals: Gold 0 Silver 0 Bronze 0 Total 0

World Aquatics Championships appearances
- 1973; 1975; 1978; 1982; 1986; 1991; 1994; 1998; 2001; 2003; 2005; 2007; 2009; 2011; 2013; 2015; 2017; 2019; 2022; 2023; 2024

Mozambique competed at the 2019 World Aquatics Championships in Gwangju, South Korea from 12 to 28 July.

== Swimming ==
Mozambique entered three swimmers.

Men

| Athlete | Event | Heat | | Semifinal | | Final | |
| Athlete | Event | Time | Rank | Time | Rank | Time | Rank |
|---|---|---|---|---|---|---|---|
| Erico Cuna | 50 m freestyle | 24.60 | 84 | did not advance | | | |
| Erico Cuna | 50 m butterfly | 25.40 | 61 | did not advance | | | |
| Igor Mogne | 200 m freestyle | 1:52.19 | 48 | did not advance | | | |
| Igor Mogne | 400 m freestyle | 3:54.90 | 29 | — | | did not advance | |

Women

| Athlete | Event | Heat | | Semifinal | | Final | |
| Athlete | Event | Time | Rank | Time | Rank | Time | Rank |
|---|---|---|---|---|---|---|---|
| Domingas Munhemeze | 50 m freestyle | 30.98 | 87 | did not advance | | | |
| Domingas Munhemeze | 50 m butterfly | 34.53 | 61 | did not advance | | | |
