= Izzy Shne Joachim =

Vincentian swimmer (born 2000)

Personal information
- Born: May 11, 2000 (age 26)

Sport
- Sport: Swimming

Izzy Shne Joachim (born May 11, 2000) is a Vincentian swimmer. She competed in the 50 m freestyle and 100 m freestyle, 50 m, 100 m and 200 m breaststroke, 50 m backstroke, 50 m butterfly and 100 m individual medley events at the 2012 FINA World Swimming Championships (25 m). Joachim also competed in the 50 m and 100 m breaststroke events at the 2013 World Aquatics Championships. She competed at the 2016 Summer Olympics in the women's 100 metre breaststroke event; her time of 1:17.37 in the heats did not qualify her for the semifinals.
