= Swimming at the 2018 Commonwealth Games – Men's 50 metre breaststroke =

2018 commonwealth games event

Men's 50 metre breaststroke at the 2018 Commonwealth Games
- Venue: Gold Coast Aquatic Centre
- Dates: 8 April (heats, semifinals); 9 April (final)
- Competitors: 34 from 21 nations
- Winning time: 26.58

Medalists
gold medal	Cameron van der Burgh	South Africa
silver medal	Adam Peaty	England
bronze medal	James Wilby	England

The men's 50 metre breaststroke event at the 2018 Commonwealth Games was held on 8 and 9 April at the Gold Coast Aquatic Centre.

== Records ==
Prior to this competition, the existing world, Commonwealth and Games records were as follows:

World record	Adam Peaty (GBR)	25.95	Budapest, Hungary	25 July 2017
Commonwealth record	Adam Peaty (GBR)	25.95	Budapest, Hungary	25 July 2017
Games record	Adam Peaty (ENG)	26.74	Gold Coast, Australia	7 April 2018

The following records were established during the competition:

Date	Event	Name	Nationality	Time	Record
8 April	Semifinal	Adam Peaty	England	26.49	GR

== Results ==
=== Heats ===
The heats were held on 8 April at 10:46.

Rank	Heat	Lane	Name	Nationality	Time	Notes
1	5	4	Adam Peaty	England	26.98	Q
2	4	4	Cameron van der Burgh	South Africa	27.01	Q
3	5	5	Jake Packard	Australia	27.42	Q
4	3	4	James McKechnie	Australia	27.53	Q
5	3	5	James Wilby	England	27.58	Q
6	5	3	Euan Inglis	Scotland	27.84	Q
7	5	6	Michael Houlie	South Africa	27.92	Q
8	4	5	Craig Benson	Scotland	28.06	Q
9	3	3	Mark Campbell	Scotland	28.10	Q
9	4	6	Liam Hunter	Australia	28.10	Q
11	3	6	Brad Tandy	South Africa	28.17	Q
12	5	2	Elijah Wall	Canada	28.29	Q
13	4	2	Ludovico Corsini	Mozambique	28.56	Q
14	4	3	Jamie Graham	Northern Ireland	28.80	Q
15	3	2	Izaak Bastian	Bahamas	29.39	Q
16	4	8	Epeli Rabua Herbert	Fiji	29.61	Q
17	3	7	Taichi Vakasama Taichi	Fiji	29.79	
18	2	5	Samuele Rossi	Seychelles	29.82	
18	4	1	Guy Davies	Isle of Man	29.82	
20	4	7	Corey Ollivierre	Grenada	29.85	
21	5	7	David Ebanks	Cayman Islands	30.04	
22	2	4	Alexandros Axiotis	Zambia	30.10	
23	5	8	Mohammad Islam	Bangladesh	30.37	
24	3	1	Ashley Seeto	Papua New Guinea	30.51	
25	3	8	Ahllan Bique	Mozambique	30.52	
26	2	3	Leonard Kalate	Papua New Guinea	30.97	
27	2	6	Jonathan Chung Yee	Mauritius	31.25	
28	2	1	Moonakala Kumaren	Zambia	29.39	
29	2	2	Jadon Wuilliez	Antigua and Barbuda	31.38	
30	2	7	Nikolas Sylvester	Saint Vincent and the Grenadines	31.64	
31	1	3	Duwaine Yon	Saint Helena	36.52	
32	2	8	Colby Thomas	Saint Helena	37.41	
33	1	4	Faletiute Tinapa	Tuvalu	38.44	
34	1	5	Scott George	Saint Helena	40.58	
	5	1	Ralph Goveia	Zambia	DNS	

=== Semifinals ===
The semifinals were held on 8 April at 20:19.

==== Semifinal 1 ====
Rank	Lane	Name	Nationality	Time	Notes
1	4	Cameron van der Burgh	South Africa	26.95	Q
2	5	James McKechnie	Australia	27.67	Q
3	3	Euan Inglis	Scotland	27.85	Q
4	6	Craig Benson	Scotland	28.00	
5	2	Liam Hunter	Australia	28.05	
6	7	Elijah Wall	Canada	28.52	
7	1	Jamie Graham	Northern Ireland	28.66	
8	8	Izaak Bastian	Bahamas	29.79	

==== Semifinal 2 ====
Rank	Lane	Name	Nationality	Time	Notes
1	4	Adam Peaty	England	26.49	Q, GR
2	3	James Wilby	England	27.41	Q
3	5	Jake Packard	Australia	27.55	Q
4	6	Michael Houlie	South Africa	27.64	Q
5	7	Brad Tandy	South Africa	27.99	Q
6	2	Mark Campbell	Scotland	28.07	
7	1	Ludovico Corsini	Mozambique	28.53	
8	8	Epeli Rabua Herbert	Fiji	29.28	

=== Final ===
The final was held on 9 April at 21:07.

Rank	Lane	Name	Nationality	Time	Notes
1st place, gold medalist(s)	5	Cameron van der Burgh	South Africa	26.58	
2nd place, silver medalist(s)	4	Adam Peaty	England	26.62	
3rd place, bronze medalist(s)	3	James Wilby	England	27.37	
4	6	Jake Packard	Australia	27.53	
5	7	James McKechnie	Australia	27.59	
6	2	Michael Houlie	South Africa	27.83	
7	1	Euan Inglis	Scotland	28.03	
8	8	Brad Tandy	South Africa	28.37	
