= International School Seychelles =

- Mont Fleuri, Mahé; Seychelles

Information
- Type: Private School
- Motto: You are not born for yourself, but for the world
- Established: 1969
- Principal: Mrs Elodie Vallantine
- Staff: 130
- Enrollment: 1100
- Colors: Blue and white
- Affiliation: COBIS
- Website: http://iss.sc

The International School Seychelles was founded in 1969. It is a coeducational nonprofit making school.

== A Brief History ==
The International School was founded in 1969, as a co-educational non-profit making organisation. The school is owned by the International School Association, of which every parent of children in the school is automatically a member. The school is recognised and licensed by the Ministry of Education. The school is non-denominational and the religious beliefs of all faiths are respected. Initially, the school was established to provide a British-style education for the children of expatriates working in Seychelles. During the last thirty years the school has expanded and, since 1994, has welcomed Seychellois children.

== Present ==
Today these Seychellois students are in the majority, with India, Britain, South Africa and China well represented. Originally the school catered only for primary age children, however during the last fifteen years the school has evolved to its present character, where children aged 3 years to 18 years are educated. The school offers accredited learning programmes that are internationally recognised:

- The curriculum of the primary school is based upon the National Curriculum for England.
- The International General Certificate of Education (IGCSE) is taught in Year 10 and 11, using the Cambridge and Pearson examination boards.
- AS and A2 Level international qualifications (AS and A2 Level) are offered in the Sixth Form, using the Cambridge, Pearson and Oxford AQA examination boards. They prepare students for university studies in Seychelles and overseas.

== Location ==
The school is situated on the outskirts of Victoria in the Mont Fleuri District, Mahé, Seychelles.

== Facilities ==
The school benefits from a range of facilities, including: classrooms with interactive whiteboards or projectors, aircon in all classrooms and offices, 2 Music rooms, 2 halls for Drama and assemblies, 3 computer rooms, 3 Science labs, Nurse's station, 2 counselling rooms, Library, Sixth Form centre and a tuck shop.

== Board of Governors ==
The Board of Governors is elected every three years by the Association members at a general meeting. The Board consists of the Chairperson Ms Priscille Chetty, the Secretary Ms Preethi Nair, the Treasurer Mr Paulian Kazibwe, and other elected members, Mr Frank Ally, Mr Chetan Pandya, Ms Alexandra Benoiton, Ms Angelique Antat and Mr Ralph Volcere. Co-opted members include Captain Joachim Valmont.

== Staff ==
The school is led by a Senior Leadership Team including the Executive Head, the Head of Primary, the Head of Secondary, the Inclusion Manager and the Finance & Operations Manager.

The school employs both Seychellois and expatriate staff.
