= Mozambique at the 2023 World Aquatics Championships =

- Flag of Mozambique
- FINA code: MOZ
- National federation: Federação Moçambicana de Natação

in Fukuoka, Japan
- Competitors: 3 in 1 sport
- Medals: Gold 0 Silver 0 Bronze 0 Total 0

World Aquatics Championships appearances
- 1973; 1975; 1978; 1982; 1986; 1991; 1994; 1998; 2001; 2003; 2005; 2007; 2009; 2011; 2013; 2015; 2017; 2019; 2022; 2023; 2024

Mozambique is set to compete at the 2023 World Aquatics Championships in Fukuoka, Japan from 14 to 30 July.

== Swimming ==
Mozambique entered 3 swimmers.

Men

Athlete	Event	Heat		Semifinal		Final	
Athlete	Event	Time	Rank	Time	Rank	Time	Rank
Matthew Lawrence	50 metre breaststroke	29.02	42	Did not advance			
Matthew Lawrence	50 metre butterfly	24.70	55	Did not advance			
Justino Pale	100 metre freestyle	54.68	95	Did not advance			
Justino Pale	200 metre freestyle	1:58.32	62	Did not advance			

Women

Athlete	Event	Heat		Semifinal		Final	
Athlete	Event	Time	Rank	Time	Rank	Time	Rank
Denise Donelli	50 metre freestyle	28.97	76	Did not advance			
Denise Donelli	50 metre backstroke	32.39	50	Did not advance			
