= Ludovico Corsini =

Italian-Mozambican swimmer

Personal information
- Nationality: Mozambique; Italy
- Born: 3 May 1993 (age 33) Milan, Italy
- Height: 192 cm (6 ft 4 in)
- Weight: 88 kg (194 lb)

Sport
- Country: Mozambique
- Sport: Swimming

Ludovico Corsini (born 3 May 1993 in Milan, Italy) is an Italian-Mozambican swimmer specializing in Sprint breaststroke. In 2018, he competed at the XXI Commonwealth Games in Gold Coast in the men's 50 and 100 breaststroke.
