= Celeste Brown (swimmer) =

Australian-Cook Island swimmer

Personal information
- Nationality: Australian-Cook Island
- Born: 4 August 1994 (age 30); Hornsby, Australia
- Height: 168 cm (5 ft 6 in)
- Weight: 71 kg (157 lb)

Sport
- Sport: Swimming

Celeste Brown (born 4 August 1994 in Hornsby, Australia) is an Australian-Cook Island swimmer. She competed in the women's 50m freestyle at the 2012 Summer Olympics in London, finishing with a time of 29.36 seconds in 54th place in the heats. She is a member of the Church of Jesus Christ of Latter-day Saints.
