= Sporting CP (swimming) =

Portuguese swimming club

Club information
- Full name: Sporting Clube de Portugal
- City: Lisbon, Portugal
- Founded: 1921
- Home pool: Multidesportivo Sporting
- Chairman: Frederico Varandas

Swimming
- Head coach: Carlos Cruchinho
- League: Portuguese Championship
- 2017–18: Men – 1st Women – 3rd

Sporting Clube de Portugal has a swimming section, based in Lisbon, Portugal, since 1921, and competes in Campeonato Nacional de Clubes de Natação (National Club Championship of Swimming). The club has achieved multiple trophies, especially in men, where is champion for the eighth consecutive year.

Sporting pools are located in Multidesportivo Sporting, a building near the José Alvalade Stadium.

== Honours ==
=== Domestic Competitions ===
- Campeonato Nacional de Clubes: 9

2011/2012, 2012/2013, 2013/2014, 2014/2015, 2015/2016, 2016/2017, 2017/2018, 2018/2019, 2021/2022

- Campeonatos Nacionais de Clubes da II Divisão: 3

2003/2004, 2007/2008, 2010/2011

=== Domestic Competitions ===
- Campeonato Nacional de Clubes: 9

2000/2001, 2001/2002, 2002/2003, 2003/2004, 2004/2005, 2005/2006, 2021/2022, 2022/2023, 2024/2025

== See also ==
- List of Portuguese records in swimming
