= Erico Cuna =

Mozambican swimmer

Sport
- Sport: Swimming

Erico Cuna (born 25 May) is a Mozambican swimmer. In 2019, he represented Mozambique at the 2019 World Aquatics Championships held in Gwangju, South Korea where he competed in the heats in the men's 50 metre freestyle event.

In 2018, he represented Mozambique at the 2018 Commonwealth Games held in Gold Coast, Australia.
