= Monica Saili =

Samoan swimmer

Personal information
- Born: September 18, 1997 (age 29)

Sport
- Sport: Swimming
- Strokes: Freestyle, backstroke, breaststroke, butterfly, medley

Monica Saili (born 18 September 1997) is a Samoan swimmer who currently lives in New Zealand.

== Career and education ==
She competed in the 50 m, 100 m, 200 m, 400m, 800 m freestyle, 50 m, 100 m breaststroke, 50 m, 100 m backstroke, 100 m butterfly and 100 m individual medley events at the 2012 FINA World Swimming Championships (25 m). Saili also competed in the 800 m and 400 m freestyle events at the 2013 World Aquatics Championships.

She subsequently studied languages and culture at Victoria University of Wellington.
