= Zhao Jin (swimmer) =

Chinese swimmer (born 1988)

Personal information
- Born: March 17, 1988 (age 38) Datong, Shanxi, China

Sport
- Sport: Swimming
- Strokes: Breaststroke
Medal record
Representing China
World Championships (SC)
Gold medal – first place	2010 Dubai	4x100m medley relay
Bronze medal – third place	2010 Dubai	50m breaststroke
Asian Games
Silver medal – second place	2010 Guangzhou	50m breaststroke

Zhao Jin (Chinese: 赵瑾; born 17 March 1988) is a Chinese swimmer. She competed for China at the 2012 Summer Olympics.

== See also ==
- China at the 2012 Summer Olympics - Swimming
