= Alania Suttie =

Samoan swimmer

Personal information
- Born: 23 February 1999 (age 27)

Sport
- Sport: Swimming

Alania Suttie (born 23 February 1999) is a Samoan swimmer. She competed in the women's 200 metre butterfly event at the 2017 World Aquatics Championships.
