= Alicia Mateus =

Mozambican swimmer (born 2004)

Personal information
- Nationality: Mozambican
- Born: 9 May 2004 (age 22)

Sport
- Sport: Swimming

Alicia Mateus (born 9 May 2004) is a Mozambican swimmer. She competed in the women's 50 metre freestyle at the 2020 Summer Olympics.
