= Brandon Schuster =

Samoan swimmer

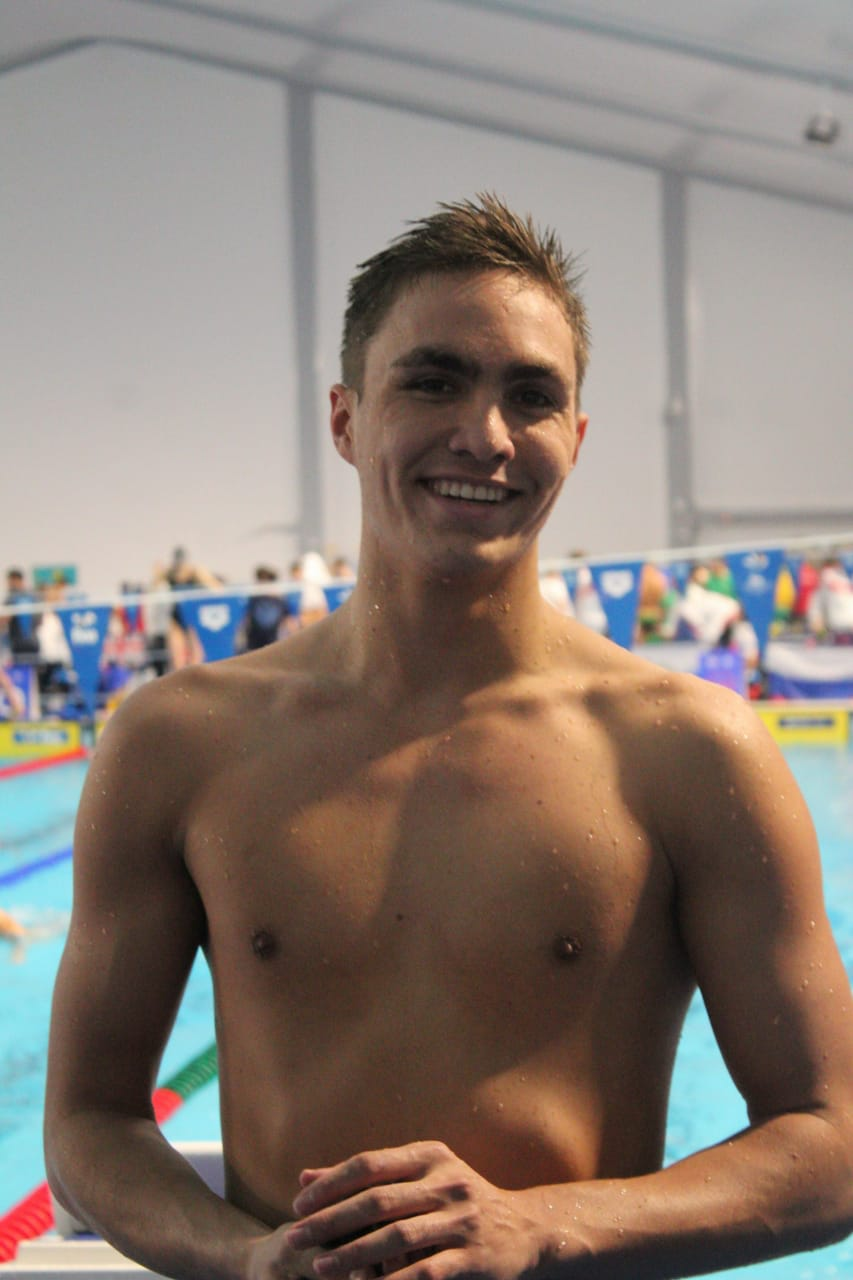

Personal information
- Nationality: Samoa
- Born: 23 April 1998 (age 28) Suva, Fiji
- Height: 188 cm (6 ft 2 in)
- Weight: 75 kg (165 lb)

Sport
- Sport: Swimming
- Event(s): Freestyle, Backstroke, Individual Medley
- Club: Tanifa O Le Vai Swim Club
Medal record
Men's swimming
Representing Samoa
Pacific Games
Gold medal – first place	2019 Apia	200 m backstroke
Gold medal – first place	2019 Apia	400 m medley
Silver medal – second place	2015 Port Moresby	400 m medley
Silver medal – second place	2019 Apia	200 m medley
Bronze medal – third place	2015 Port Moresby	200 m backstroke
Bronze medal – third place	2019 Apia	400 m freestyle
Bronze medal – third place	2019 Apia	200 m breastroke
Oceania Championships
Silver medal – second place	2018 Port Moresby	400 m medley
Bronze medal – third place	2016 Suva	400 m medley
Bronze medal – third place	2018 Port Moresby	200 m medley
- Updated on 4 November 2021

Brandon Schuster (born 23 April 1998 in Fiji) is a Samoan swimmer who represented Samoa at the 2016 Summer Olympics. He holds multiple Samoan records in swimming.

== Personal life ==
Schuster is the son of Samoan politician Toeolesulusulu Cedric Schuster. He was educated at Robert Louis Stevenson School in Apia, and at California Baptist University, graduating with a Bachelor of Science in Biomedical Engineering in 2021.

== Swimming career ==
=== 2012 ===
At the 2012 FINA World Swimming Championships (25 m) he competed in the 50m, 100m and 200 metre freestyle events, the 50m, 100m and 200 metre backstroke events, the 50m, 100m and 200 metre breaststroke events, and the 100 metre individual medley.

=== 2013 ===
He represented Samoa at the 2013 World Aquatics Championships, racing in the 400m and 800 metre freestyle events.

=== 2014 ===
He represented Samoa at the 2014 Commonwealth Games, competing in the 50m, 100m, 200m and 400 metre freestyle, the 200 metre breaststroke and the 200 metre individual medley.

At the 2014 FINA World Swimming Championships (25 m), he raced in the 50m, 100m, 200m and 400 metre freestyle and the 200 metre breaststroke.

=== 2015 ===
Schuster competed at the 2015 Pacific Games, winning bronze in the 200 metre backstroke, and silver in the 400 metre individual medley race. He set a national record in the 400 metre individual medley.

At the 2015 Commonwealth Youth Games, held in Samoa, Schuster finished 6th in the 400 metre individual medley.

He represented Samoa at the 2015 World Aquatics Championships, racing in the 200m and 400 metre freestyle events.

=== 2016 ===
At the 2016 Oceania Swimming Championships, he won bronze in the 400 metre individual medley race, breaking his national record in the process. He also competed in the 400m, 200 metre individual medley and 5 km races.

At the 2016 Summer Olympics he competed in the Men's 200 m freestyle, where he ranked 46th with a time of 1:57.72. He did not advance to the semifinals.

2016 started competing with California Baptist University

=== 2017 ===
Competed at the NCAA division 2 Championships in Alabama for the California Baptist University and placed 4th in the 400im.

At the 2017 World Aquatics Championships in Budapest, Hungary he competed in the men's 200 freestyle and 400im.

=== 2018 ===
Competed at the 2018 Commonwealth Games for team Samoa and swam the 50, 100, 200 and 400 freestyle. As well as the 200 and 400 Individual Medley. He set Samoan records in the 50, 100 and 400 freestyle.

=== 2019 ===
Competed in the 2019 Pacific Games for team Samoa and was one of the Games torch runners for the opening. He competed in multiple swimming events medaling with Gold for the 200 Backstroke and 400 Individual Medly, Silver in the 200 IM, as well as receiving Bronze in the 400 Freestyle and 200 Breaststroke. He was named and awarded the "Male Athlete of the 2019 Pacific Games" for his accolades in Samoa swimming and being a cornerstone in Pacific swimming development. He then competed at eh FINA World Aquatics Championships swimming in the 400 IM and 200 IM.

At the ANOC Awards 2019 held in Doha, Qatar he was awarded with the "Best Male Athlete in Oceania" for 2019. He was subsequently named one of the Samoa Observer's 2019 "people of the year".
