= Igor Mogne =

Mozambican swimmer (born 1996)

Personal information
- Born: 1 August 1996 (age 29) Maputo, Mozambique

Sport
- Country: Mozambique
- Sport: Swimming
- Club: Sporting Clube de Portugal

Igor Araujo Mogne (born 1 August 1996) is a Mozambican competitive swimmer. He competed at the 2016 Summer Olympics in Rio de Janeiro, in the men's 100 metre freestyle.

== Career ==
Mogne began to swim at just six years old; since the age of eight, Mogne participated in swimming competitions. First he swam 2004-2008 for the swimming club Desportivo de Maputo. Since 2008, he is a member of the association Golfinhos de Maputo. [2] Meanwhile, Mogne also competes for the Portuguese club Sporting Clube de Portugal.

Mogne has represented Mozambique in numerous international competitions, among others at the 2014 Commonwealth Games in Scotland. In 2016, Mogne represented Mozambique at the 2016 Summer Olympics in Rio de Janeiro is the only male swimmer. In the 100 m freestyle, Mogne reached with a time of 50.65 s the 45th place and was eliminated in the first round.

He competed in the men's 400 metre freestyle event at the 2020 Summer Olympics.
