= Jessica Teixeira Vieira =

Mozambican swimmer

Jessica Vieira
Personal information
- Full name: Jessica Teixeira Vieira
- Nickname: Jessy
- Nationality: Mozambique
- Born: 13 November 1991 (age 34) Maputo, Mozambique
- Height: 1.66 m (5 ft 5 in)
- Weight: 60 kg (132 lb)

Sport
- Sport: Swimming
- Strokes: Freestyle

Jessica Teixeira Vieira (born 13 November 1991 in Maputo, Mozambique) is a Mozambican swimmer. She competed at the 2012 Summer Olympics in the 50 m freestyle event.
