= Kokoro Frost =

Samoan swimmer

Personal information
- Full name: Thomas Kokoro Frost
- Nationality: Samoa
- Born: 14 September 2002 (age 24)

Sport
- Sport: Swimming
- Events: Butterfly, Backstroke
- Club: Ōtaki Titans

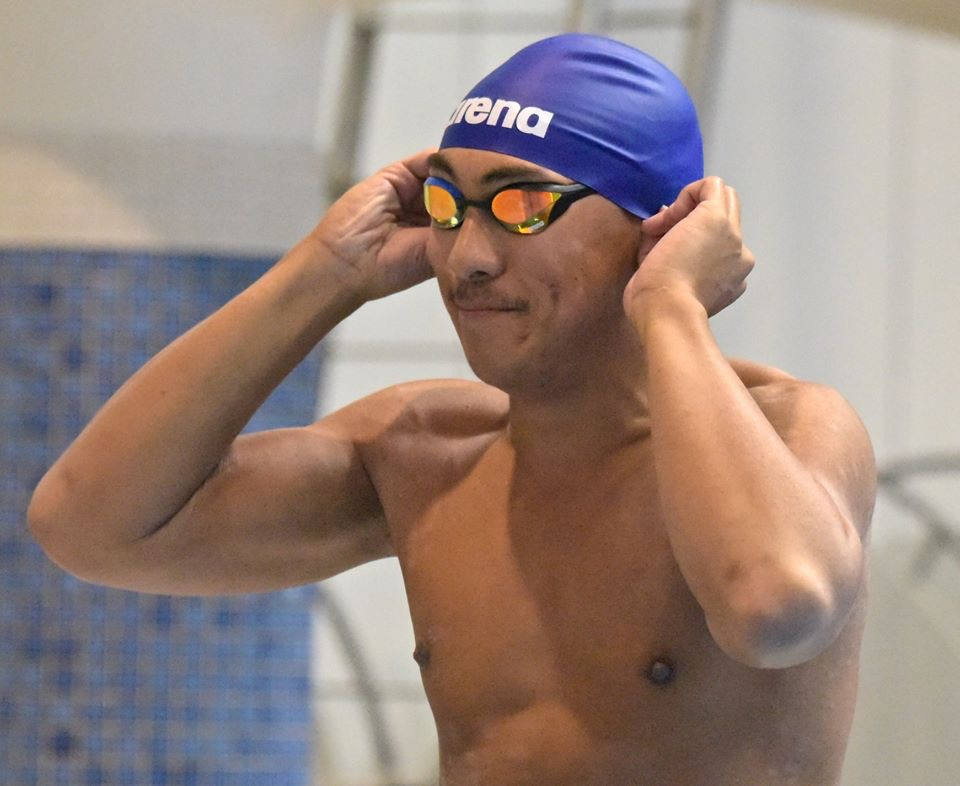
Kokoro Frost

Thomas Kokoro Frost (born 14 September 2002) is a Samoan New Zealander swimmer who has represented Samoa at the Pacific Games, Commonwealth Games and World Aquatics Championships. He holds multiple age group and open Samoan records for swimming.

Frost hails from the villages of Manase and Fasito’outa. He was educated at Palmerston North Boys' High School and Kāpiti College. He attended Victoria University of Wellington where he studied Intercultural Communications at undergraduate and postgraduate level.

He began swimming in 2008. He trains and competes for the Ōtaki Titans Swimming Club based on the Kāpiti Coast and is coached by his mother, Seuga Frost and Olympian Jonathan Winter.

He competed at the 2019 Pacific Games in Apia, where he made individual finals in the 50m and 100m backstroke.

On 14 July 2022 he was selected as part of Samoa's team for the 2022 Commonwealth Games in Birmingham. He competed in the 50m and 100m Butterfly, 50m and 100m backstroke, and both the mixed 4 × 100 m Medley and Freestyle relays.

In December 2022, he was a member of the Samoan team that competed in Melbourne for the 16th FINA World Swimming Championships (25m).
