= Aurélie Fanchette =

Seychellois swimmer

Aurelie Fanchette
Personal information
- Nationality: Seychelles
- Born: 20 September 1997 (age 28) Victoria, Seychelles
- Height: 5 ft 4 in (163 cm)
- Weight: 110 lb (50 kg)

Sport
- Sport: Swimming
- Strokes: Freestyle

Aurélie Fanchette (born 20 September 1997) is a Seychellois swimmer who competed at the 2012 Summer Olympics when she was just 14 years old.

== Personal life ==
Fanchette was born on 20 September 1997 in Victoria, Seychelles. She attended the International School Seychelles where she won the Year 13 Subject Award for Business Studies.

== Swimming career ==
Fanchette, participated regularly at competitions in the Seychelles, and at her school, she has a choice of two pools to train in, a 25m pool and a 50m Olympic pool.

Her first major international event was the 2011 World Aquatics Championships in Shanghai, China she was just 13 years old, she competed in the Women's 200 metre freestyle and came 48th out of 49 in the heats, she also competed in the 200 metre backstroke in which she finished 39th.

Later in 2012 she also competed at the 2012 FINA World Swimming Championships (25 m) which was held in Istanbul, Turkey.

Fanchette was third overall at the Shrone Austin Victoria Open Championship with 72 points. Fanchette was also a participant in a recent Ironwoman competition which involved swimming, canoeing and running. She won with two other young swimmers, Clara Omath and Felicity Passon with a time of 20 minutes, 40.3 seconds.

Fanchette was one of two wildcard entries into At the 2012 Summer Olympics she finished 35th overall in the heats in the Women's 200 metre freestyle and failed to reach the semifinals although she did swim her personal best of 2:23.49, some 27 seconds behind the winner of the heats Federica Pellegrini. At just 14, Fanchette was one of the youngest competitors at the Games.
