= Miriam Corsini =

Italian-Mozambican swimmer (born 1989)

Corsini Miriam
Personal information
- Nationality: Mozambique; Italy
- Born: 5 May 1989 (age 37) Milan, Italy
- Height: 1.74 m (5 ft 9 in)

Sport
- Sport: Swimming
- Strokes: Breaststroke
- Club: DDS Milano
Medal record
All-Africa Games
| Silver medal – second place | 2011 Maputo | 50m breaststroke |

Miriam Corsini (born 5 May 1989 in Milan, Italy) is an Italian-Mozambican swimmer specializing in Sprint breaststroke. In the 2011, she won the silver medal in the 50 breaststroke, at the All-Africa Games. In the 2013, she was the first Mozambican swimmer to obtain the qualifying time for the 15th FINA World Championships.
