= Swimming at the 2015 African Games =

Swimming at the XI African Games
- Venue: Kintele Aquatic Complex (pool)
- Date: 6–11 September 2015
- Website: http://www.cojabrazzaville2015.com/en/calendrier-sport/?sport=16

The Swimming competitions at the 2015 African Games in Brazzaville was held between 6 and 11 September at the Kintele Aquatic Complex.

== Events ==
Similar to the program's format in 2015, swimming features a total of 42 events (20 each for men and women), including two Mixed events. The following events were contested (all pool events are long course, and distances are in metres unless stated):

- Freestyle: 50, 100, 200, 400, 800, and 1500;
- Backstroke: 50, 100 and 200;
- Breaststroke: 50, 100 and 200;
- Butterfly: 50, 100 and 200;
- Individual medley: 200 and 400;
- Relays: 4 × 100 free, 4 × 200 free; 4 × 100 medley
- Mixed events: 4 × 100 m freestyle relay and 4 × 100 m medley relay

=== Schedule ===
Legend
Key	H	½	F	TF
Value	Heats	Semifinals	Final	Timed final

A = Afternoon session, N = Night session

Men
Date →	Sun 6		Sep 7		Sep 8		Sep 9		Sep 10		Sep 11	
Event ↓	A	N	A	N	A	N	A	N	A	N	A	N
50 m freestyle											H	F
100 m freestyle					H	F						
200 m freestyle	H	F										
400 m freestyle								F				
800 m freestyle				F								
1500 m freestyle										F		
50 m backstroke	H	F										
100 m backstroke									H	F		
200 m backstroke					H	F						
50 m breaststroke			H	F								
100 m breaststroke	H	F										
200 m breaststroke							H	F				
50 m butterfly					H	F						
100 m butterfly			H	F								
200 m butterfly									H	F		
200 m individual medley											H	F
400 m individual medley		F										
4 × 100 m freestyle relay							H	F				
4 × 200 m freestyle relay						F						
4 × 100 m medley relay												F

Women
Date →	Sun 6		Sep 7		Sep 8		Sep 9		Sep 10		Sep 11	
Event ↓	A	N	A	N	A	N	A	N	A	N	A	N
50 m freestyle									H	F		
100 m freestyle	H	F										
200 m freestyle			H	F								
400 m freestyle						F						
800 m freestyle								F				
1500 m freestyle												F
50 m backstroke	H	F										
100 m backstroke					H	F						
200 m backstroke												F
50 m breaststroke					H	F						
100 m breaststroke							H	F				
200 m breaststroke			H	F								
50 m butterfly			H	F								
100 m butterfly							H	F				
200 m butterfly											H	F
200 m individual medley									H	F		
400 m individual medley		F										
4 × 100 m freestyle relay						F						
4 × 200 m freestyle relay		F										
4 × 100 m medley relay												F

== Medal summary ==
Swimming medal standings upon completion of the competition are:

Rank	Nation	Gold	Silver	Bronze	Total
1	South Africa	25	18	11	54
2	Egypt	11	18	12	41
3	Algeria	3	2	5	10
4	Zimbabwe	3	0	1	4
5	Tunisia	0	2	9	11
6	Angola	0	1	0	1
6	Botswana	0	1	0	1
8	Namibia	0	0	3	3
9	Seychelles	0	0	1	1
Totals (9 entries)		42	42	42	126

== Results ==
=== Men's events ===
Event	Gold		Silver		Bronze	
50 m freestyle	Douglas Erasmus; South Africa	22.61	Mazen El Kamash; Egypt	22.97	Clayton Jimmie; South Africa	22.98
100 m freestyle	Clayton Jimmie; South Africa	49.93	Mohamed Samy; Egypt	49.97	Caydon Muller; South Africa	50.28
200 m freestyle	Devon Brown; South Africa	1:47.77 GR	Marwan El Kamash; Egypt	1:48.58	Ahmed Mathlouthi; Tunisia	1:49.29
400 m freestyle	Ahmed Akram; Egypt	3:48.06	Devon Brown; South Africa	3:48.69	Ahmed Mathlouthi; Tunisia	3:51.47
800 m freestyle	Ahmed Akram; Egypt	7:55.36 GR	Marwan El Kamash; Egypt	7:59.54	Devon Brown; South Africa	7:59.57
1500 m freestyle	Ahmed Akram; Egypt	15:11.68	Ahmed Mathlouthi; Tunisia	15:30.36	Brent Szurdoki; South Africa	15:35.48
50 m backstroke	Mohamed Samy; Egypt	25.71	Richard Ellis; South Africa	25.89	Mohamed Khaled; Egypt	26.16
100 m backstroke	Richard Ellis; South Africa	55.83	David de Villiers; South Africa	55.84	Mohamed Samy; Egypt	56.31
200 m backstroke	Martin Binedell; South Africa	2:02.23	Richard Ellis; South Africa	2:02.32	Mohamed Khaled; Egypt	2:04.35
50 m breaststroke	Cameron van der Burgh; South Africa	27.18	Youssef El Kamash; Egypt	28.10	Wassim Elloumi; Tunisia	28.62
100 m breaststroke	Cameron van der Burgh; South Africa	1:00.19 GR	Youssef El Kamash; Egypt	1:02.42	Wassim Elloumi; Tunisia	1:02.79
200 m breaststroke	Ayrton Sweeney; South Africa	2:14.41	Wassim Elloumi; Tunisia	2:17.80	Youssef El Kamash; Egypt	2:19.03
50 m butterfly	Chad le Clos; South Africa	23.51	Omar Eissa; Egypt	24.18	Ahmed Bahgat; Egypt	24.94
100 m butterfly	Chad le Clos; South Africa	51.24 GR	Omar Eissa; Egypt	53.54	Nico Meyer; South Africa	55.26
200 m butterfly	Ahmed Akram; Egypt	1:58.87	Devon Brown; South Africa	1:59.28	Ahmed Hamdy; Egypt	2:01.54
200 m Individual medley	Devon Brown; South Africa	2:01.71	Mohamed Khaled; Egypt	2:02.38	Ayrton Sweeney; South Africa	2:04.22
400 m Individual medley	Ayrton Sweeney; South Africa	4:21.83	Pedro Pinotes; Angola	4:23.12	Ahmed Hamdy; Egypt	4:23.87
4 × 100 m freestyle relay	South Africa; Douglas Erasmus (50.29); Clayton Jimmie (49.67); Calvyn Justus (50.05); Caydon Muller (49.68)	3:19.69	Egypt; Omar Eissa (50.61); Mohamed Khaled (49.98); Marwan El Kamash (50.27); Mohamed Samy (49.36)	3:20.22	Algeria; Badis Djendouci (52.26); Nazim Belkhodja (50.60); Riyad Djendouci (52.28); Lies Abdelghani Nefsi (51.02)	3:26.16
4 × 200 m freestyle relay	South Africa; Brent Szurdoki (1:51.94); Calvyn Justus (1:50.68); Devon Brown (1:48.05); Chad le Clos (1:47.95)	7:18.62	Egypt; Marwan El Amrawy (1:51.60); Mohamed Samy (1:50.63); Ahmed Akram (1:48.61); Marwan El Kamash (1:49.81)	7:20.65	Tunisia; Mohamed Mehdi Laagili (1:51.01); Mohamed Ali Chaouachi (1:53.81); Wassim Elloumi (2:01.37); Ahmed Mathlouthi (1:58.87)	7:45.06
4 × 100 m medley relay	Egypt; Mohamed Khaled (56.85); Youssef El Kamash (1:02.10); Omar Eissa (54.16); Mohamed Samy (49.33)	3:42.44	South Africa; Richard Ellis (55.90); Ayrton Sweeney (1:03.39); Nico Meyer (54.37); Clayton Jimmie (49.19)	3:42.85	Tunisia; Ahmed Mathlouthi (58.10); Wassim Elloumi (1:02.93); Mohamed Mehdi Laagili (59.16); Mohamed Ali Chaoachi (51.81)	3:52.00

=== Women's events ===
Event	Gold		Silver		Bronze	
50 m freestyle	Farida Osman; Egypt	25.12 GR	Karin Prinsloo; South Africa	25.79	Rowan El Badry; Egypt	26.04
100 m freestyle	Farida Osman; Egypt	55.41 GR	Karin Prinsloo; South Africa	55.69	Rowan El Badry; Egypt	57.03
200 m freestyle	Karin Prinsloo; South Africa	2:00.14	Marlies Ross; South Africa	2:02.61	Majda Chebaraka; Algeria	2:02.63
400 m freestyle	Karin Prinsloo; South Africa	4:18.86	Majda Chebaraka; Algeria	4:19.24	Marlies Ross; South Africa	4:19.43
800 m freestyle	Majda Chebaraka; Algeria	8:58.53	Charlise Oberholzer; South Africa	9:00.15	Roaia Mashaly; Egypt	9:07.94
1500 m freestyle	Majda Chebaraka; Algeria	17:07.82	Charlise Oberholzer; South Africa	17:11.34	Souad Nafissa Cherouati; Algeria	17:18.35
50 m backstroke	Jessica Ashley Cooper; South Africa	29.05	Naomi Ruele; Botswana	29.70	Alexus Laird; Seychelles	30.07
100 m backstroke	Kirsty Coventry; Zimbabwe	1:01.15	Karin Prinsloo; South Africa	1:02.53	Jessica Ashley Cooper; South Africa	1:03.32
200 m backstroke	Kirsty Coventry; Zimbabwe	2:13.29	Karin Prinsloo; South Africa	2:14.31	Rim Ouennich; Tunisia	2:20.16
50 m breaststroke	Tatjana Schoenmaker; South Africa	32.49	Maii Atif; Egypt	32.58	Daniela Lindemeier; Namibia	32.69
100 m breaststroke	Tatjana Schoenmaker; South Africa	1:09.47	Maii Atif; Egypt	1:11.07	Daniela Lindemeir; Namibia	1:11.31
200 m breaststroke	Tatjana Schoenmaker; South Africa	2:28.84	Kelly Gunnell; South Africa	2:31.52	Daniela Lindemeier; Namibia	2:34.23
50 m butterfly	Farida Osman; Egypt	26.31 GR	Vanessa Mohr; South Africa	26.39	Jessica Ashley Cooper; South Africa	27.02
100 m butterfly	Farida Osman; Egypt	58.83	Vanessa Mohr; South Africa	1:00.26	Rita Naude; South Africa	1:03.86
200 m butterfly	Rene Warnes; South Africa	2:16.40	Rwioda Heshem; Egypt	2:17.80	Mariam Sakr; Egypt	2:20.49
200 m Individual medley	Kirsty Coventry; Zimbabwe	2:16.05	Marlies Ross; South Africa	2:17.57	Rene Warnes; South Africa	2:18.98
400 m Individual medley	Hamida Rania Nefsi; Algeria	4:56.75	Souad Nafissa Cherouati; Algeria	4:57.30	Rwioda Heshem; Egypt	4:58.88
4 × 100 m freestyle relay	South Africa; Marlies Ross (57.91); Jessica Ashley Cooper (57.14); Vannessa Mohr (58.50); Karin Prinsloo (55.49)	3:49.04	Egypt; Rowan El Badry (56.71); Salma Saber (58.43); Maii Atif (1:00.13); Farida Osman (55.03)	3:50.30	Tunisia; Rim Ouennich (59.61); Farah Ben Khelil (59.69); Asma Ben Boukhatem (1:01.15); Asma Sammoud (59.10)	3:59.55
4 × 200 m freestyle relay	South Africa; Rene Warnes (2:04.51); Marlies Ross (2:06.57); Charlise Oberholzer (2:08.04); Karin Prinsloo (2:01.16)	8:20.28	Egypt; Roaia Mashaly (2:05.51); Salma Saber (2:06.64); Mariam Sakr (2:07.20); Rowan El Badry (2:11.19)	8:30.84	Algeria; Majda Chebaraka (2:03.89); Hamida Rania Nefsi (2:13.31); Souad Nafissa Cherouati (2:08.26); Hannah Taleb Bendiab (2:09.65)	8:35.11
4 × 100 m medley relay	South Africa; Jessica Ashley Cooper (1:03.26); Tatjana Schoenmaker (1:11.07); Vannessa Mohr (1:02.10); Karin Prinsloo (55.93)	4:12.36	Egypt; Mariam Sakr (1:07.44); Maii Atif (1:11.10); Farida Osman (59.72); Rowan El Badry (56.92)	4:15.18	Tunisia; Rim Ouennich (1:06.57); Farah Ben Khelil (1:16.88); Asma Sammoud (1:04.68); Asma Ben Boukhatem (1:02.51)	4:29.64

=== Mixed events ===
Event	Gold		Silver		Bronze	
4 × 100 m freestyle relay	South Africa; Chad le Clos (48.50); Clayton Jimmie (50.22); Marlies Ross (57.10); Karin Prinsloo (55.74)	3:31.56	Egypt; Rowan El Badry (56.71); Mohammed Khaled (50.69); Farida Osman (55.69); Mohamed Samy (49.43)	3:32.52	Algeria; Nazim Belkhodja (50.70); Souad Nafissa Cherouati (58.36); Badis Djendouci (52.25); Majda Chebaraka (59.62)	3:49.04
4 × 100 m medley relay	Egypt; Mohamed Samy (57.28); Youssef El Kamash (1:02.67); Farida Osman (59.27); Rowan El Badry (56.82)	3:56.04	South Africa; Jessica Ashley Cooper (1:03.79); Alaric Basson (1:03.04); Nico Meyer (54.63); Karin Prinsloo (54.81)	3:56.27	Zimbabwe; Kirsty Coventry (1:02.10); James Lawson (1:02.92); Tarryn Rennie (1:05.08); Sean Gunn (50.68)	4:00.78
