= Angola at the 2025 World Aquatics Championships =

- Flag of Angola
- World Aquatics code: ANG
- National federation: Angolan Swimming Federation
- Website: fan.lagodeideias.com

in Singapore
- Competitors: 5 in 2 sports
- Medals: Gold 0 Silver 0 Bronze 0 Total 0

World Aquatics Championships appearances
- 1973; 1975; 1978; 1982; 1986; 1991; 1994; 1998; 2001; 2003; 2005; 2007; 2009; 2011; 2013; 2015; 2017; 2019; 2022; 2023; 2024; 2025

Angola has competed at the 2025 World Aquatics Championships in Singapore from 11 July to 3 August 2025.

== Competitors ==
The following is the list of competitors in the Championships.

Sport	Men	Women	Total
Open water swimming	1	0	1
Swimming	2	2	4
Total	3	2	5

== Open water swimming ==
Men

Athlete	Event	Final	
Athlete	Event	Time	Rank
David Padre	5 km	DNF	

== Swimming ==
Men

Athlete	Event	Heat		Semifinal		Final	
Athlete	Event	Time	Rank	Time	Rank	Time	Rank
Janel Yondu Tati	50 m freestyle	24.52	79	Did not advance			
Janel Yondu Tati	100 m freestyle	57.41	95	Did not advance			
Pedro Pinotes	200 m breaststroke	2:32.22	28	Did not advance			
Pedro Pinotes	200 m medley	2:13.28	43	Did not advance			

Women

Athlete	Event	Heat		Semifinal		Final	
Athlete	Event	Time	Rank	Time	Rank	Time	Rank
Carlota Filipa Silva	50 m freestyle	28.61	70	Did not advance			
Carlota Filipa Silva	50 m butterfly	29.78	66	Did not advance			
Lia Lima	100 m butterfly	1:03.86	46	Did not advance			
Lia Lima	200 m butterfly	2:23.77	24	Did not advance			
