= Angola at the 2017 World Aquatics Championships =

- Flag of Angola
- World Aquatics code: ANG
- National federation: Angolan Swimming Federation
- Website: fan.lagodeideias.com

in Budapest, Hungary
- Competitors: 5 in 2 sports
- Medals: Gold 0 Silver 0 Bronze 0 Total 0

World Aquatics Championships appearances
- 1973; 1975; 1978; 1982; 1986; 1991; 1994; 1998; 2001; 2003; 2005; 2007; 2009; 2011; 2013; 2015; 2017; 2019; 2022; 2023; 2024; 2025

Angola is scheduled to compete at the 2017 World Aquatics Championships in Budapest, Hungary from 14 July to 30 July.

== Open water swimming ==
Angola has entered one open water swimmer

Athlete	Event	Time	Rank
Pedro Pinotes	Men's 5 km	57:22.8	47
Pedro Pinotes	Men's 10 km	2:03:26.5	54

== Swimming ==
Angola has received a Universality invitation from FINA to send a maximum of four swimmers (two men and two women) to the World Championships.

Athlete	Event	Heat		Semifinal		Final	
Athlete	Event	Time	Rank	Time	Rank	Time	Rank
Mario Ervedosa	Men's 50 m breaststroke	29.26	48	did not advance			
Mario Ervedosa	Men's 100 m breaststroke	1:05.28	58	did not advance			
Daniel Francisco	Men's 50 m butterfly	26.33	61	did not advance			
Daniel Francisco	Men's 100 m butterfly	58.79	68	did not advance			
Ana Sofia Nóbrega	Women's 100 m freestyle	1:00.92	=61	did not advance			
Ana Sofia Nóbrega	Women's 50 m butterfly	30.18	47	did not advance			
Catarina Sousa	Women's 50 m freestyle	28.12	58	did not advance			
Catarina Sousa	Women's 50 m backstroke	32.24	56	did not advance			
Mario Ervedosa; Daniel Francisco; Ana Sofia Nóbrega; Catarina Sousa	Mixed 4×100 m medley relay	4:15.68	20	—N/a		did not advance	
