= List of Angolan records in swimming =

The Angolan records in swimming are the fastest ever performances of swimmers from Angola, which are recognised and ratified by the Federação Angolana de Natação (FAN).

All records were set in finals unless noted otherwise.

== Long Course (50 m) ==
=== Men ===
Event	Time		Name	Club	Date	Meet	Location	Ref
50 m freestyle	23.64	r	Henrique Mascarenhas	Fluvial Portuense	9 June 2024	Porto International Meeting	Porto, Portugal	
100 m freestyle	51.78	h	Henrique Mascarenhas	University of Bath	22 June 2024	Sette Colli Trophy	Rome, Italy	
200 m freestyle	1:53.14	r	Pedro Pinotes	Sporting CP	1 April 2015	Portuguese Championships	Coimbra, Portugal	
400 m freestyle	3:59.10	h	Pedro Pinotes	Sporting CP	26 July 2014	Portuguese Championships	Oeiras, Portugal	
800 m freestyle	8:19.30		Pedro Pinotes	Sporting CP	27 July 2014	Portuguese Championships	Oeiras, Portugal	
1500 m freestyle	16:03.76		Pedro Pinotes	Sporting CP	28 March 2013	Portuguese Championships	Coimbra, Portugal	
50m backstroke	27.64		Salvador Gordo	University of Stirling	11 April 2024	McCullagh International Meet	Bangor, United Kingdom	
100m backstroke	59.30		Pedro Lima	-	16 February 1992	-	Lisbon, Portugal	
200m backstroke	2:13.80		Pedro Pinotes	Angola	15 September 2010	African Championships	Casablanca, Morocco	
50m breaststroke	28.89	h	Mario Ervedosa	Angola	11 September 2018	African Championships	Algiers, Algeria	
100m breaststroke	1:05.28	h	Mario Ervedosa	Angola	23 July 2017	World Championships	Budapest, Hungary	
200m breaststroke	2:21.65	h	Pedro Pinotes	Angola	28 July 2011	World Championships	Shanghai, China	
50m butterfly	25.04	h	Salvador Gordo	Angola	18 June 2022	World Championships	Budapest, Hungary	
100m butterfly	54.73	h	Salvador Gordo	University of Stirling	10 April 2022	Swim Open Stockholm	Stockholm, Sweden	
200m butterfly	2:03.27		Pedro Pinotes	Sporting CP	11 April 2015	Portuguese Club Championships	Oeiras, Portugal	
200m individual medley	2:04.23		Pedro Pinotes	Sporting CP	11 April 2015	Portuguese Club Championships	Oeiras, Portugal	
400m individual medley	4:23.12		Pedro Pinotes	Angola	7 September 2015	African Games	Brazzaville, Republic of the Congo	
4×50m freestyle relay	1:36.15			Angola	6 May 2023	-	Luanda, Angola	
4×100m freestyle relay	3:35.03		Daniel Francisco (53.45); Pedro Pinotes (54.92); Henrique Mascarenhas (56.26); Salvador Gordo (50.31)	Angola	14 October 2021	African Championships	Accra, Ghana	
4×200m freestyle relay	8:02.28		Henrique Mascarenhas (1:58.97); Daniel Francisco (2:04.88); Salvador Gordo (2:00.96); Pedro Pinotes (1:57.47)	Angola	13 October 2021	African Championships	Accra, Ghana	
4×50m medley relay	1:49.87			Angola	25 May 2013	-	Coimbra, Portugal	
4×100m medley relay	4:02.03		Salvador Gordo (1:02.54); Pedro Pinotes (1:06.95); Daniel Francisco (58.57); Henrique Mascarenhas (53.97)	Angola	16 October 2021	African Championships	Accra, Ghana	

Legend: # – Record awaiting ratification by Federação Angolana de Natação; WR – World record; AF – African record;
Records not set in finals: h – heat; sf – semifinal; r – relay 1st leg; rh – relay heat 1st leg; b – B final; † – en route to final mark; so – swim-off; tt – time trial

=== Women ===
Event	Time		Name	Club	Date	Meet	Location	Ref
50m freestyle	27.59	h	N'Hara Fernandes	Fluvial Portuense	29 July 2023	Portuguese Championships	Coimbra, Portugal	
100m freestyle	59.11	rh	Catarina Sousa	Angola	27 July 2019	World Championships	Gwangju, South Korea	
200m freestyle	2:09.41		Catarina Sousa	-	24 August 2018	-	Algiers, Algeria	
400m freestyle	4:39.92		Ana Sofia Nóbrega	Ginásio Clube de Vila Real	19 December 2015	Portuguese Club Championships	Coimbra, Portugal	
800m freestyle	9:44.66		Rafaela Santo	Angola	13 March 2024	African Games	Accra, Ghana	
1500 m freestyle	18:36.84		Rafaela Santo	Angola	30 April 2024	African Championships	Luanda, Angola	
50m backstroke	31.60	h	Catarina Sousa	Angola	23 August 2019	African Games	Casablanca, Morocco	
100m backstroke	1:07.96	h	Catarina Sousa	Angola	22 July 2019	World Championships	Gwangju, South Korea	
200m backstroke	2:30.65		Catarina Sousa	Angola	20 May 2018	XI International Meeting City of Coimbra	Coimbra, Portugal	
50m breaststroke	34.73		N'Hara Fernandes	Fluvial Portuense	23 June 2024	Territorial Championships	Póvoa de Varzim, Portugal	
100m breaststroke	1:14.89		Nádia Cruz	-	1998	-	United States	
200m breaststroke	2:40.71		Nádia Cruz	-	1 June 1995	-	Charlotte, United States	
50m butterfly	28.33		Lia Lima	Sporting	7 April 2019	Portuguese Championships	Coimbra, Portugal	
100m butterfly	1:02.30		Lia Lima	Alges	8 February 2020	Lisbon International Meet	Lisbon, Portugal	
200m butterfly	2:18.91	h	Lia Lima	Benfica	9 June 2024	Porto International Meeting	Porto, Portugal	
200m individual medley	2:29.36		Lia Lima	Alges	8 February 2020	Lisbon International Meet	Lisbon, Portugal	
400m individual medley	5:18.56		Lia Lima	Angola	3 May 2024	African Championships	Luanda, Angola	
4×50m freestyle relay	1:55.28			Angola	6 May 2023	-	Luanda, Angola	
4×100m freestyle relay	4:09.86		Carlota Filipa Silva (1:02.83); N’Hara Fernandes (1:02.47); Nyriam Morais (1:02.80); Maria Lopes Freitas (1:01.76)	Angola	3 May 2024	African Championships	Luanda, Angola	
4×200m freestyle relay	9:13.70		Maria Lopes Freitas (2:13.97); Rhanya Santo (2:23.12); Lia Lima (2:18.52); Rafaela Santo (2:18.09)	Angola	2 May 2024	African Championships	Luanda, Angola	
4×50m medley relay	2:18.95			Clube Desportivo 1° de Agosto	26 January 2014	-	Luanda, Angola	
4×100m medley relay	4:38.40		Carlota Filipa Silva; N’Hara Fernandes; Lia Lima; Maria Lopes Freitas	Angola	4 May 2024	African Championships	Luanda, Angola	

Legend: # – Record awaiting ratification by Federação Angolana de Natação; WR – World record; AF – African record;
Records not set in finals: h – heat; sf – semifinal; r – relay 1st leg; rh – relay heat 1st leg; b – B final; † – en route to final mark; so – swim-off; tt – time trial

=== Mixed relay ===
Event	Time	Name	Club	Date	Meet	Location	Ref
4×100 m freestyle relay	3:48.99	Daniel Francisco (54.38); Pedro Pinotes (53.23); Catarina Sousa (1:00.02); Maria Freitas (1:01.36)	Angola	12 October 2021	African Championships	Accra, Ghana	
4×100 m medley relay	4:14.58	Salvador Gordo; Pedro Pinotes; Lia Lima; Catarina Sousa	Angola	15 October 2021	African Championships	Accra, Ghana	

Legend: # – Record awaiting ratification by Federação Angolana de Natação; WR – World record; AF – African record;
Records not set in finals: h – heat; so – swim-off

== Short Course (25 m) ==
=== Men ===
Event	Time		Name	Club	Date	Meet	Location	Ref
50 m freestyle	23.16		Henrique Mascarenhas	Fluvial Portuense	9 December 2023	Portuguese Championships	Leiria, Portugal	
100 m freestyle	50.63		Henrique Mascarenhas	Fluvial Portuense	8 December 2023	Portuguese Championships	Leiria, Portugal	
200 m freestyle	1:49.60	h	Pedro Pinotes	Angola	3 December 2014	World Championships	Doha, Qatar	
400 m freestyle	3:49.54		Pedro Pinotes	-	20 December 2014	-	Porto, Portugal	
800 m freestyle	7:55.24		Pedro Pinotes	-	19 December 2014	-	Porto, Portugal	
1500 m freestyle	15:23.53		Pedro Pinotes	-	20 December 2013	-	Felgueiras, Portugal	
50 m backstroke	26.18		Salvador Gordo	-	10 December 2022	-	Edinburgh, United Kingdom	
100 m backstroke	56.92		João Matias	-	17 December 2011	-	Mealhada, Portugal	
200 m backstroke	2:05.37		Pedro Pinotes	-	21 October 2013			
50 m breaststroke	29.38	h	Mario Ervedosa	Angola	15 December 2018	World Championships	Hangzhou, China	
100 m breaststroke	1:02.72		Pedro Pinotes	-	21 December 2018	-	Felgueiras, Portugal	
200 m breaststroke	2:12.89		Pedro Pinotes	-	4 December 2009	-	Leiria, Portugal	
50 m butterfly	24.56	b	Salvador Gordo	Stirling	19 November 2023	BUCS Championships	Sheffield, United Kingdom	
100 m butterfly	53.49		Salvador Gordo	Stirling	10 December 2023	Scottish Championships	Edinburgh, United Kingdom	
200 m butterfly	2:00.08		Pedro Pinotes	-	17 December 2011	-	Mealhada, Portugal	
100 m individual medley	56.78	h	Pedro Pinotes	Angola	6 December 2014	World Championships	Doha, Qatar	
200 m individual medley	1:59.79		Pedro Pinotes	-	5 December 2009	-	Leiria, Portugal	
400 m individual medley	4:10.55		Pedro Pinotes	-	4 December 2009	-	Leiria, Portugal	
4×50 m freestyle relay	1:36.46		Enzo Anjos; David Padre; Yusseni Furtado; Janel Tati	Angola	3 September 2025	Africa Aquatics Zone IV SC Championships	Manzini, Eswatini	
4×100 m freestyle relay	3:35.23		Guilherme Sousa; Santiago Rocha Guimarães; Janel Tati; Enzo Anjos	Angola	6 September 2025	Africa Aquatics Zone IV SC Championships	Manzini, Eswatini	
4×200 m freestyle relay	8:33.38		Daniel Francisco; Richard Fernandes; Márcio Fernandes; Pedro Pinotes	Desportivo 1° de Agosto	13 March 2016	-	Luanda, Angola	
4×50 m medley relay	1:51.31		Luyane Costa; Filipe Freitas; Yusseni Furtado; Djamel Pires	Desportivo 1° de Agosto	17 December 2022	-	Luanda, Angola	
4×100 m medley relay	4:06.01		David Padre; Silverio Manuel; Enzo Anjos; Janel Tati	Angola	9 September 2025	Africa Aquatics Zone IV SC Championships	Manzini, Eswatini	

Legend: # – Record awaiting ratification by Federação Angolana de Natação; WR – World record; AF – African record;
Records not set in finals: h – heat; sf – semifinal; r – relay 1st leg; rh – relay heat 1st leg; b – B final; † – en route to final mark; so – swim-off; tt – time trial

=== Women ===
Event	Time		Name	Club	Date	Meet	Location	Ref
50 m freestyle	26.34		Kayra Tati	Clube Desportivo 1º de Agosto	20 December 2025	Angolan Championships	Luanda, Angola	
100 m freestyle	58.05	h	Ana Sofia Nóbrega	Angola	7 December 2016	World Championships	Windsor, Canada	
200 m freestyle	2:07.23	h	Ana Sofia Nóbrega	Angola	7 December 2014	World Championships	Doha, Qatar	
400 m freestyle	4:33.79	h	Yara Lima	Angola	5 December 2014	World Championships	Doha, Qatar	
800 m freestyle	9:39.24		Catarina Sousa	-	20 December 2018	-	Luanda, Angola	
800 m freestyle	9:38.55	#	Rhanya Santo	Clube Nautico da Ilha de Luanda	19 December 2025	Angolan Championships	Luanda, Angola	
1500 m freestyle	18:29.02		Catarina Sousa	-	18 December 2018	-	Luanda, Angola	
50 m backstroke	31.21		Catarina Sousa	-	18 December 2018	-	Luanda, Angola	
100 m backstroke	1:04.12	h	Catarina Sousa	Angola	16 December 2021	World Championships	Abu Dhabi, United Arab Emirates	
200 m backstroke	2:23.90		Lia Ana Lima	-	10 November 2019	-	Albufeira, Portugal	
50 m breaststroke	34.69		Nádia Cruz	-	1 March 1996	-	Lisbon, Portugal	
100 m breaststroke	1:14.08		Nádia Cruz	-	21 June 1999	-	Lisbon, Portugal	
200 m breaststroke	2:39.48		Nádia Cruz	Angola	18 April 1987	-	Gothenburg, Sweden	
50 m butterfly	28.61		Lia Ana Lima	-	20 December 2019	-	Albufeira, Portugal	
100 m butterfly	1:03.25 (Note: 1:03.04 in Porto by FAN source, but on the same date)	h	Ana Sofia Nóbrega	Angola	6 December 2014	World Championships	Doha, Qatar	
200 m butterfly	2:14.65		Lia Ana Lima	Angola	22 December 2019	-	Felgueiras, Portugal	
100 m individual medley	1:05.85		Catarina Sousa	Angola	14 December 2019	-	Luanda, Angola	
200 m individual medley	2:24.45		Lia Ana Lima	Angola	9 November 2019	-	Albufeira, Portugal	
400 m individual medley	5:01.12		Lia Ana Lima	Angola	20 December 2019	-	Falgueiras, Portugal	
4×50 m freestyle relay	1:56.17		Nyriam Morias (28.37); Inara Santos (31.30); Maria Parimbelli (28.58); Rhanya Santo (27.92)	Clube Náutico da Ilha de Luanda	20 December 2025	Angolan Championships	Luanda, Angola	
4×100 m freestyle relay	4:16.11		Nyriam Morias (1:02.98); Maria Parimbelli (1:03.89); Chelsia Vunge (1:04.71); Rhanya Santo (1:04.53)	Clube Náutico da Ilha de Luanda	21 December 2025	Angolan Championships	Luanda, Angola	
4×200 m freestyle relay	9:34.26		Rafaela Santo; Nyriam Morais; Welwitchia Silva; Maria Freitas	Clube Náutico da Ilha de Luanda	19 March 2022	-	Luanda, Angola	
4×50 m medley relay	2:09.91			Clube Desportivo 1º de Agosto	19 January 2025	-	Luanda, Angola	
4×100 m medley relay	4:51.38		Nyriam Morias (1:11.75); Maria Parimbelli (1:24.61); Welwitchia Silva (1:15.35); Rhanya Santo (59.67)	Clube Náutico da Ilha de Luanda	20 December 2025	Angolan Championships	Luanda, Angola	

Legend: # – Record awaiting ratification by Federação Angolana de Natação; WR – World record; AF – African record;
Records not set in finals: h – heat; sf – semifinal; r – relay 1st leg; rh – relay heat 1st leg; b – B final; † – en route to final mark; so – swim-off; tt – time trial

=== Mixed relay ===
Event	Time		Name	Club	Date	Meet	Location	Ref
4×50 m freestyle relay	1:43.93	h		Angola	17 December 2021	World Championships	Abu Dhabi, United Arab Emirates	
4×50 m freestyle relay	1:42.35	h, not ratified	João Matias (24.10); Pedro Pinotes (23.37); Ana Sofia Nóbrega (26.80); Yara Lima (28.08)	Angola	7 December 2016	World Championships	Windsor, Canada	
4×50 m medley relay	1:52.84	h	Catarina Sousa (30.27); Salvador Gordo (30.32); Lia Ana Lima (28.91); Henrique Mascarenhas (23.34)	Angola	18 December 2021	World Championships	Abu Dhabi, United Arab Emirates	

Legend: # – Record awaiting ratification by Federação Angolana de Natação; WR – World record; AM – Americas record;
Records not set in finals: h – heat; so – swim-off
