= Angola at the 2013 World Aquatics Championships =

- Flag of Angola
- World Aquatics code: ANG
- National federation: Angolan Swimming Federation
- Website: fan.lagodeideias.com

in Barcelona, Spain
- Competitors: 4 in 1 sports
- Medals Ranked -th: Gold 0 Silver 0 Bronze 0 Total 0

World Aquatics Championships appearances
- 1973; 1975; 1978; 1982; 1986; 1991; 1994; 1998; 2001; 2003; 2005; 2007; 2009; 2011; 2013; 2015; 2017; 2019; 2022; 2023; 2024; 2025

Angola competed at the 2013 World Aquatics Championships in Barcelona, Spain from 19 July to 4 August 2013.

== Swimming ==
Angolan swimmers achieved qualifying standards in the following events (up to a maximum of 2 swimmers in each event at the A-standard entry time, and 1 at the B-standard):

Men

Athlete	Event	Heat		Semifinal		Final	
Athlete	Event	Time	Rank	Time	Rank	Time	Rank
Pedro Pinotes	200 m individual medley	2:04.85	42	did not advance			
Pedro Pinotes	400 m individual medley	4:23.36	23	—		did not advance	
Nuno Miguel Rola	100 m butterfly	DNS		did not advance			
Nuno Miguel Rola	200 m butterfly	DNS		did not advance			

João Matias, who was due to compete in the 50 m and 100 m butterfly withdrew and was replaced with Rola.

Women

Athlete	Event	Heat		Semifinal		Final	
Athlete	Event	Time	Rank	Time	Rank	Time	Rank
Yara Lima	50 m freestyle	28.69	60	did not advance			
Yara Lima	200 m freestyle	2:16.01	42	did not advance			
Ana Nóbrega	100 m freestyle	1:00.15	58	did not advance			
Ana Nóbrega	100 m butterfly	1:06.55	45	did not advance			
