= Angola at the 2015 World Aquatics Championships =

- Flag of Angola
- FINA code: ANG
- National federation: Angolan Swimming Federation
- Website: fan.lagodeideias.com

in Kazan, Russia
- Competitors: 3 in 1 sport
- Medals: Gold 0 Silver 0 Bronze 0 Total 0

World Aquatics Championships appearances
- 1973; 1975; 1978; 1982; 1986; 1991; 1994; 1998; 2001; 2003; 2005; 2007; 2009; 2011; 2013; 2015; 2017; 2019; 2022; 2023; 2024

Angola competed at the 2015 World Aquatics Championships in Kazan, Russia from 24 July to 9 August 2015.

== Swimming ==
Angolan swimmers have achieved qualifying standards in the following events (up to a maximum of 2 swimmers in each event at the A-standard entry time, and 1 at the B-standard):

Men

Athlete	Event	Heat		Semifinal		Final	
Athlete	Event	Time	Rank	Time	Rank	Time	Rank
João Aguiar	50 m freestyle	24.44	66	did not advance			
João Aguiar	50 m breaststroke	29.92	52	did not advance			
Pedro Pinotes	200 m individual medley	2:04.85	34	did not advance			
Pedro Pinotes	400 m individual medley	4:23.85	31	—		did not advance	

Women

Athlete	Event	Heat		Semifinal		Final	
Athlete	Event	Time	Rank	Time	Rank	Time	Rank
Ana Nobrega	50 m freestyle	28.02	=72	did not advance			
Ana Nobrega	100 m butterfly	1:05.84	57	did not advance			
