= Angola at the 2019 World Aquatics Championships =

- Flag of Angola
- FINA code: ANG
- National federation: Angolan Swimming Federation

World Aquatics Championships appearances
- 1973; 1975; 1978; 1982; 1986; 1991; 1994; 1998; 2001; 2003; 2005; 2007; 2009; 2011; 2013; 2015; 2017; 2019; 2022; 2023; 2024

Angola competed at the 2019 World Aquatics Championships in Gwangju, South Korea from 12 to 28 July.

== Open water swimming ==
Angola qualified one male open water swimmer.

Athlete	Event	Time	Rank
João Duarte	Men's 5 km	1:04:05.5	58

== Swimming ==
Angolan swimmers have achieved qualifying standards in the following events (up to a maximum of 2 swimmers in each event at the A-standard entry time, and 1 at the B-standard)

Men

Athlete	Event	Heat		Semifinal		Final	
Athlete	Event	Time	Rank	Time	Rank	Time	Rank
Daniel Francisco	50 m freestyle	24.21	79	did not advance			
Daniel Francisco	50 m butterfly	25.15	57	did not advance			
Salvador Gordo	100 m butterfly	57.32	62	did not advance			
Salvador Gordo	200 m butterfly	2:11.27	46	did not advance			

Women

Athlete	Event	Heat		Semifinal		Final	
Athlete	Event	Time	Rank	Time	Rank	Time	Rank
Lia Ana Lima	100 m butterfly	1:04.40	43	did not advance			
Lia Ana Lima	200 m butterfly	2:22.15	30	did not advance			
Catarina Sousa	100 m freestyle	59.28	54	did not advance			
Catarina Sousa	100 m backstroke	1:07.96	53	did not advance			

Mixed

Athlete	Event	Heat		Final	
Athlete	Event	Time	Rank	Time	Rank
Catarina Sousa; Daniel Francisco; Lia Ana Lima; Salvador Gordo	4 × 100 m mixed freestyle relay	3:51.09	29	did not advance	
Salvador Gordo; Daniel Francisco; Lia Lima; Catarina Sousa	4 × 100 m mixed medley relay	4:17.38	27	did not advance	
