= Angola at the 2022 World Aquatics Championships =

- Flag of Angola
- FINA code: ANG
- National federation: Angolan Swimming Federation

in Budapest, Hungary
- Competitors: 5 in 1 sport
- Medals: Gold 0 Silver 0 Bronze 0 Total 0

World Aquatics Championships appearances
- 1973; 1975; 1978; 1982; 1986; 1991; 1994; 1998; 2001; 2003; 2005; 2007; 2009; 2011; 2013; 2015; 2017; 2019; 2022; 2023; 2024

Angola competed at the 2022 World Aquatics Championships in Budapest, Hungary from 18 June to 3 July.

== Open water swimming ==
Angolan swimmers have achieved qualifying standards in the following events.

Athlete	Event	Time	Rank
Pedro Pinotes	Men's 5 km	1:00:15.0	48

== Swimming ==
Angolan swimmers have achieved qualifying standards in the following events.

Athlete	Event	Heat		Semifinal		Final	
Athlete	Event	Time	Rank	Time	Rank	Time	Rank
Salvador Gordo	Men's 50 m butterfly	25.04	51	did not advance			
Salvador Gordo	Men's 100 m butterfly	DNS					
Henrique Mascarenhas	Men's 100 m freestyle	53.28	71	did not advance			
Henrique Mascarenhas	Men's 200 m freestyle	1:58.03	55	did not advance			
Maria Lopes Freitas	Women's 50 m breaststroke	35.80	48	did not advance			
Maria Lopes Freitas	Women's 100 m breaststroke	1:18.55	48	did not advance			
Lia Ana Lima	Women's 50 m butterfly	29.31	47	did not advance			
Lia Ana Lima	Women's 100 m butterfly	1:06.51	26	did not advance			
