= Angola at the 2023 World Aquatics Championships =

- Flag of Angola
- FINA code: ANG
- National federation: Angolan Swimming Federation

in Fukuoka, Japan
- Competitors: 6 in 2 sports
- Medals: Gold 0 Silver 0 Bronze 0 Total 0

World Aquatics Championships appearances
- 1973; 1975; 1978; 1982; 1986; 1991; 1994; 1998; 2001; 2003; 2005; 2007; 2009; 2011; 2013; 2015; 2017; 2019; 2022; 2023; 2024

Angola is set to compete at the 2023 World Aquatics Championships in Fukuoka, Japan from 14 to 30 July.

== Open water swimming ==
Angola entered 3 open water swimmers.

Men

| Athlete | Event | Time | Rank |
|---|---|---|---|
| Yano Elias | Men's 5 km | OTL | |
| Alex Fortes | Men's 5 km | DNS | |

Women

| Athlete | Event | Time | Rank |
|---|---|---|---|
| Rafaela Santo | Women's 5 km | OTL | |

== Swimming ==
Angola entered 4 swimmers.

Men

| Athlete | Event | Heat | | Semifinal | | Final | |
| Athlete | Event | Time | Rank | Time | Rank | Time | Rank |
|---|---|---|---|---|---|---|---|
| Salvador Gordo | 50 metre butterfly | 25.48 | 61 | Did not advance | | | |
| Salvador Gordo | 100 metre butterfly | 55.44 | 51 | Did not advance | | | |
| Henrique Mascarenhas | 100 metre freestyle | 52.38 | 75 | Did not advance | | | |
| Henrique Mascarenhas | 200 metre freestyle | 1:55.09 | 52 | Did not advance | | | |

Women

| Athlete | Event | Heat | | Semifinal | | Final | |
| Athlete | Event | Time | Rank | Time | Rank | Time | Rank |
|---|---|---|---|---|---|---|---|
| Lia Ana Lima | 100 metre butterfly | 1:04.88 | 44 | Did not advance | | | |
| Lia Ana Lima | 200 metre butterfly | 2:26.95 | 28 | Did not advance | | | |
| Maria Lopes Freitas | 50 metre freestyle | 28.78 | 75 | Did not advance | | | |
| Maria Lopes Freitas | 200 metre freestyle | 2:14.03 | 60 | Did not advance | | | |

Mixed

| Athlete | Event | Heat | | Final | |
| Athlete | Event | Time | Rank | Time | Rank |
|---|---|---|---|---|---|
| Henrique Mascarenhas; Salvador Gordo; Maria Lopes Freitas; Lia Ana Lima | 4 × 100 m freestyle relay | 3:58.84 | 36 | Did not advance | |
| Salvador Gordo; Maria Lopes Freitas; Lia Ana Lima; Henrique Mascarenhas | 4 × 100 m medley relay | 4:21.15 | 32 | Did not advance | |
