= Angola at the 2011 World Aquatics Championships =

- Flag of Angola
- FINA code: ANG
- National federation: Angolan Swimming Federation
- Website: fan.lagodeideias.com

in Shanghai, China
- Competitors: 3 in 1 sports
- Medals Ranked -th: Gold 0 Silver 0 Bronze 0 Total 0

World Aquatics Championships appearances
- 1973; 1975; 1978; 1982; 1986; 1991; 1994; 1998; 2001; 2003; 2005; 2007; 2009; 2011; 2013; 2015; 2017; 2019; 2022; 2023; 2024

Angola competed at the 2011 World Aquatics Championships in Shanghai, China between July 16 and 31, 2011.

== Swimming ==
Angola qualified 3 swimmers.

Men

Athlete	Event	Heats		Semifinals		Final	
Athlete	Event	Time	Rank	Time	Rank	Time	Rank
Pedro Pinotes	200 m breaststroke	2:21.65	44	did not advance			
Pedro Pinotes	400 m individual medley	4:28.81	27			did not advance	
Joao Matias	50 m butterfly	26.06	39	did not advance			
Joao Matias	100 m butterfly	58.20	56	did not advance			

Women

Athlete	Event	Heats		Semifinals		Final	
Athlete	Event	Time	Rank	Time	Rank	Time	Rank
Mariana Henriques	50 m freestyle	30.83	63	did not advance			
Mariana Henriques	50 m breaststroke	37.23	27	did not advance			
Mariana Henriques	100 m breaststroke	1:26.27	43	did not advance			
Mariana Henriques	50 m butterfly	34.59	48	did not advance			
