= Swimming at the 2015 African Games – Men's 200 metre Individual medley =

Men's 200 metre Individual medley at the 2015 African Games
- Venue: Kintele Aquatic Complex
- Date: September 11, 2015
- Competitors: 10 from 9 nations

Medalists
| gold medal | Devon Brown | South Africa |
| silver medal | Mohamed Khaled | Egypt |
| bronze medal | Ayrton Sweeney | South Africa |

The Men's 200 metre Individual medley event at the 2015 African Games took place on 11 September 2015 at Kintele Aquatic Complex.

== Schedule ==
All times are Congo Standard Time (UTC+01:00)

| Date | Time | Event |
|---|---|---|
| Friday, 11 September 2015 | 10:33 | Heat 1 |
| Friday, 11 September 2015 | 10:37 | Heat 2 |
| Friday, 11 September 2015 | 17:35 | Final |

== Results ==
=== Heats ===
The heats were held on 11 September.

=== Final ===
The final were held on 11 September.

| Rank | Athlete | Time | Notes |
|---|---|---|---|
| 1st place, gold medalist(s) | Devon Brown (RSA) | 2:01.71 | |
| 2nd place, silver medalist(s) | Mohamed Khaled (EGY) | 2:02.38 | |
| 3rd place, bronze medalist(s) | Ayrton Sweeney (RSA) | 2:04.22 | |
| 4 | Ahmed Mathlouthi (TUN) | 2:04.44 | |
| 5 | Mohamed Samy (EGY) | 2:04.53 | |
| 6 | Pedro Pinotes (ANG) | 2:08.84 | |
| 7 | James Lawson (ZIM) | 2:11.07 | |
| 8 | Kimani Maina (KEN) | 2:14.55 | |
