= Angola at the 2024 World Aquatics Championships =

- Flag of Angola
- FINA code: ANG
- National federation: Angolan Swimming Federation
- Website: fan.lagodeideias.com

in Doha, Qatar
- Competitors: 5 in 2 sports
- Medals: Gold 0 Silver 0 Bronze 0 Total 0

World Aquatics Championships appearances
- 1973; 1975; 1978; 1982; 1986; 1991; 1994; 1998; 2001; 2003; 2005; 2007; 2009; 2011; 2013; 2015; 2017; 2019; 2022; 2023; 2024

Angola competed at the 2024 World Aquatics Championships in Doha, Qatar from 2 to 18 February.

== Competitors ==
The following is the list of competitors in the Championships.

Sport	Men	Women	Total
Open water swimming	1	1	2
Swimming	1	2	3
Total	2	3	5

== Open water swimming ==
Men

Athlete	Event	Time	Rank
Yano Elias	Men's 5 km	OTL	

Women

Athlete	Event	Time	Rank
Rafaela Santo	Women's 10 km	DNF	

== Swimming ==
Angola entered 3 swimmers.

Men

Athlete	Event	Heat		Semifinal		Final	
Athlete	Event	Time	Rank	Time	Rank	Time	Rank
Henrique Mascernhas	100 metre freestyle	52.62	71	Did not advance			
Henrique Mascernhas	200 metre freestyle	1:54.82	52	Did not advance			

Women

Athlete	Event	Heat		Semifinal		Final	
Athlete	Event	Time	Rank	Time	Rank	Time	Rank
N'Hara Fernandes	50 metre freestyle	29.13	76	Did not advance			
N'Hara Fernandes	50 metre breaststroke	36.34	37	Did not advance			
Lia Lima	100 metre butterfly	1:03.98	34	Did not advance			
Lia Lima	200 metre butterfly	2:23.83	24	Did not advance			
