= Swimming at the 2015 African Games – Men's 200 metre butterfly =

Men's 200 metre butterfly at the 2015 African Games
- Venue: Kintele Aquatic Complex
- Date: September 10, 2015
- Competitors: 10 from 8 nations

Medalists
gold medal	Ahmed Akram	Egypt
silver medal	Devon Brown	South Africa
bronze medal	Ahmed Hamdy	Egypt

The Men's 200 metre butterfly event at the 2015 African Games took place on 10 September 2015 at Kintele Aquatic Complex.

== Schedule ==
All times are Congo Standard Time (UTC+01:00)

Date	Time	Event
Thursday, 10 September 2015	10:00	Heat 1
Thursday, 10 September 2015	10:04	Heat 2
Thursday, 10 September 2015	17:40	Final

== Results ==
=== Heats ===
The heats were held on 10 September.

=== Final ===
The final were held on 10 September.

Rank	Athlete	Time	Notes
1st place, gold medalist(s)	Ahmed Akram (EGY)	1:58.87	
2nd place, silver medalist(s)	Devon Brown (RSA)	1:59.28	
3rd place, bronze medalist(s)	Ahmed Hamdy (EGY)	2:01.54	
4	Alard Basson (RSA)	2:04.21	
5	Pedro Pinotes (ANG)	2:06.65	
6	Igor Mogne (MOZ)	2:10.59	
7	Jorn Diekmann (NAM)	2:18.94	
8	Michael Botha (BOT)	2:25.45	
