= Henrique de Carvalho Santos =

Angolan politician (1940–2023)

Henrique de Carvalho Santos (5 May 1940 – 15 October 2023), also known as Henrique Onambwé, was an Angolan nationalist who served as the Minister of Industry of Angola. He created the flag of Angola after it was decolonized and gained independence.

Santos was born in Porto Amboim, in the province of Cuanza Sul on 5 May 1940. Santos studied at the University of Heidelberg in Germany. MPLA members elected him to the MPLA Central Committee during the Inter-Regional Conference of September 1974 and the political bureau in December 1977. He served in the Directorate of Information and Security of Angola (DISA) before becoming the Minister of Industry. Santos died on 15 October 2023, at the age of 83.
