= Mariana Henriques =

Angolan swimmer

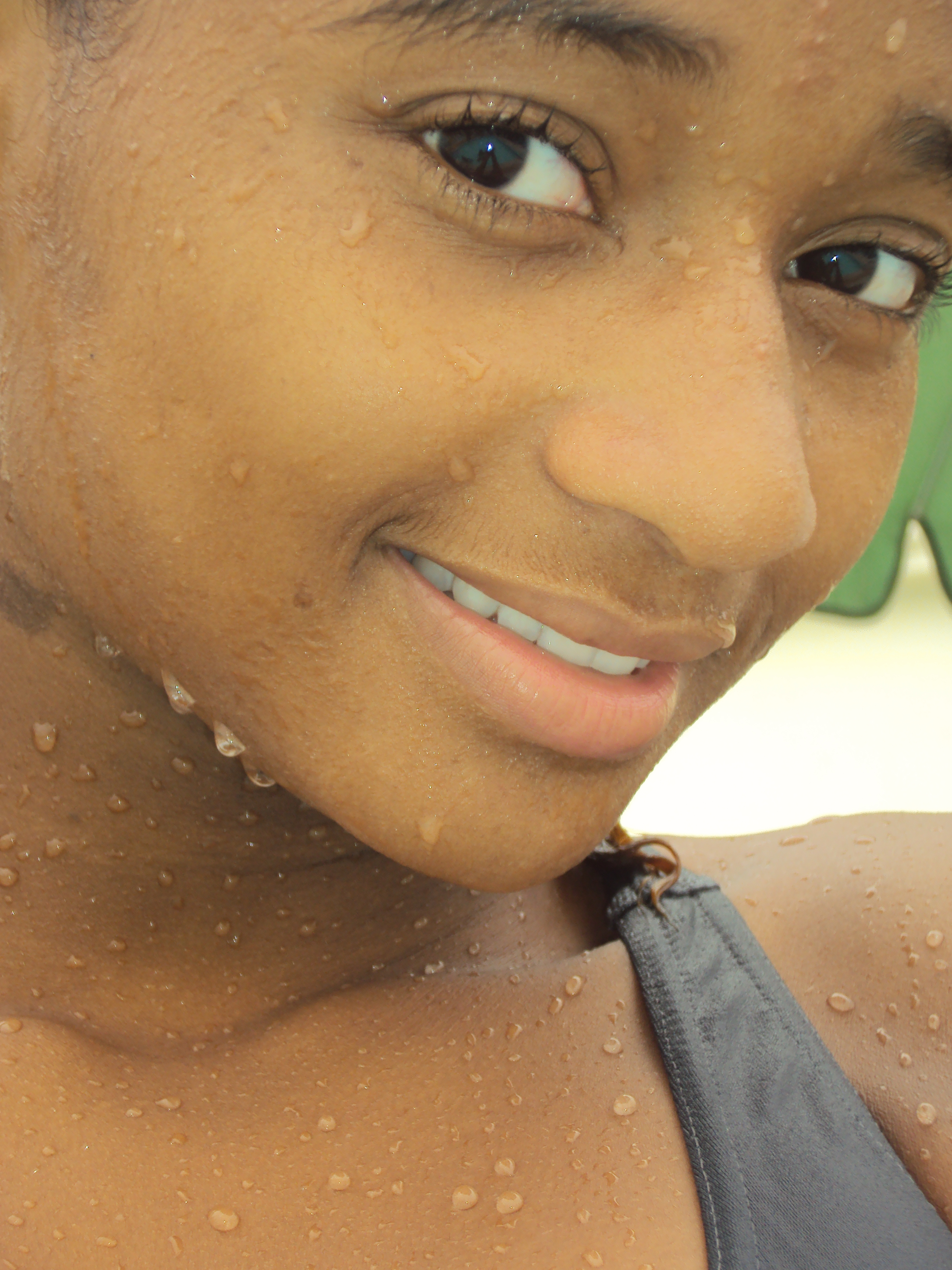
- Mariana Henriques in 2009

Personal information
- Born: 27 July 1994 (age 31) Luanda, Angola
- Height: 1.60 m (5 ft 3 in)
- Weight: 55 kg (121 lb)

Sport
- Sport: Swimming

Mariana Henriques (born 27 July 1994) is an Angolan swimmer. She competed at the 2012 Summer Olympics in the 50 m freestyle, but failed to reach the final.

== Career ==
Born in Luanda, Henriques represented Angola at the 2010 Summer Youth Olympics, in 50 metre breaststroke and 100 metre breaststroke. She competed at the 2011 World Aquatics Championships, the only woman qualified from Angola.

She placed 61st in women's 50 metre freestyle at the 2012 Summer Olympics in London.
