= James Lawson (swimmer) =

Zimbabwean swimmer (born 1995)

Personal information
- Nationality: Zimbabwean
- Born: 17 January 1995 (age 31)

Sport
- Sport: Swimming
- Strokes: breaststroke, medley
Medal record
African Games
| Bronze medal – third place | 2015 Brazzaville | 4x100 m mixed medley relay |

James Lawson (born 17 January 1995) is a Zimbabwean swimmer. He competed in the men's 50 metre breaststroke event at the 2017 World Aquatics Championships.

== Career ==
Lawson participated at the 2011 All-Africa Games when he qualify 3 individual final (50 & 100 m breaststroke and 200 m medley), and was part of Zimbabwean relay team. Later that year he won 2 gold and 1 bronze medal at the African Junior Swimming Championships at the Port Harcourt, Nigeria.

=== Major results ===
==== Individual ====
===== Long course =====
| Year | Competition | Venue | Position | Event | Notes |
Representing Zimbabwe
| 2011 | All-Africa Games | Maputo, Mozambique | 7th | 50 m breaststroke | 30.02 |
| 2011 | All-Africa Games | Maputo, Mozambique | 7th | 100 m breaststroke | 1:07.27 |
| 2011 | All-Africa Games | Maputo, Mozambique | 9th (h) | 200 m breaststroke | 2:31.16 |
| 2011 | All-Africa Games | Maputo, Mozambique | 8th | 200 m medley | 2:17.08 |
| 2013 | World Championships | Barcelona, Spain | 51st (h) | 50 m breaststroke | 29.22 |
| 2013 | World Championships | Barcelona, Spain | 54th (h) | 100 m breaststroke | 1:05.12 |
| 2015 | World Championships | Kazan, Russia | 45th (h) | 50 m breaststroke | 28.85 NR |
| 2015 | World Championships | Kazan, Russia | 55th (h) | 100 m breaststroke | 1:04.03 |
| 2015 | African Games | Brazzaville, Republic of the Congo | 7th | 50 m breaststroke | 29.14 |
| 2015 | African Games | Brazzaville, Republic of the Congo | 4th | 100 m breaststroke | 1:03.11 NR |
| 2015 | African Games | Brazzaville, Republic of the Congo | 6th | 200 m breaststroke | 2:22.52 |
| 2015 | African Games | Brazzaville, Republic of the Congo | 7th | 200 m medley | 2:11.07 |
| 2017 | World Championships | Budapest, Hungary | 47th (h) | 50 m breaststroke | 28.85 =NR |
| 2017 | World Championships | Budapest, Hungary | 51st (h) | 100 m breaststroke | 1:03.52 |

==== Relay ====
===== Long course =====
| Year | Competition | Venue | Team | Position | Event | Notes |
Representing Zimbabwe
| 2011 | All-Africa Games | Maputo, Mozambique | Nicholas Burnett, Sloane Marshall, Timothy Ferris | 7th | 4 × 100 m freestyle | 3:43.14 |
| 2011 | All-Africa Games | Maputo, Mozambique | Sloane Marshall, Timothy Ferris, Nicholas Burnett | 6th | 4 × 200 m freestyle | 8:21.44 |
| 2011 | All-Africa Games | Maputo, Mozambique | Nicholas Burnett, Sloane Marshall, Timothy Ferris | 7th | 4 × 100 m medley | 4:09.70 |
| 2015 | African Games | Brazzaville, Republic of the Congo | Kirsty Coventry, Tarryn Rennie, Sean Gunn | 3rd | 4 × 100 m mixed medley | 4:00.78 NR |
