= Swimming at the 2015 African Games – Women's 200 metre butterfly =

Women's 200 metre butterfly at the 2015 African Games
- Venue: Kintele Aquatic Complex
- Date: September 11, 2015

Medalists
gold medal	Rene Warnes	South Africa
silver medal	Rwioda Heshem	Egypt
bronze medal	Mariam Sakr	Egypt

The women's 200 metre butterfly event at the 2015 African Games took place on 11 September 2015 at Kintele Aquatic Complex.

== Schedule ==
All times are Congo Standard Time (UTC+01:00)

Date	Time	Event
Friday, 11 September 2015	17:10	Final

== Results ==
=== Final ===
Rank	Athlete	Time	Notes
1st place, gold medalist(s)	Rene Warnes (RSA)	2:16.40	
2nd place, silver medalist(s)	Rwioda Heshem (EGY)	2:17.80	
3rd place, bronze medalist(s)	Mariam Sakr (EGY)	2:20.49	
4	Daniela Lindemeier (NAM)	2:26.15	
5	Ana Nobrega (ANG)	2:29.01	
6	Vanessa Mohr (RSA)	2:32.12	
7	Tarryn Rennie (ZIM)	2:35.33	
8	Gessica Stagno (MOZ)	2:36.73	
9	Tessa Ip Hen Chung (MRI)	2:36.98	
