= Omar Eissa =

Egyptian swimmer

Personal information
- Nationality: Egyptian
- Born: 18 September 1996 (age 29)

Sport
- Sport: Swimming
Medal record
Representing Egypt
African Games
Silver medal – second place	2015 Brazzaville	50m butterfly
Silver medal – second place	2015 Brazzaville	100m butterfly

Omar Eissa (born 18 September 1996) is an Egyptian swimmer. He competed in the men's 50 metre butterfly event at the 2017 World Aquatics Championships. He won two silver medals at the 2015 African Games in the 50 metre and 100 metre butterfly events.
