= Swimming at the 2015 African Games – Women's 100 metre butterfly =

Women's 100 metre butterfly at the 2015 African Games
- Venue: Kintele Aquatic Complex
- Date: September 9, 2015

Medalists
gold medal	Farida Osman	Egypt
silver medal	Vanessa Mohr	South Africa
bronze medal	Rita Naude	South Africa

The women's 100 metre butterfly event at the 2015 African Games took place on 9 September 2015 at Kintele Aquatic Complex.

== Schedule ==
All times are Congo Standard Time (UTC+01:00)

Date	Time	Event
Wednesday, 7 September 2015	10:00	Heat 1
Wednesday, 7 September 2015	10:03	Heat 2
Wednesday, 7 September 2015	17:15	Final

== Results ==
=== Final ===
Rank	Athlete	Time	Notes
1st place, gold medalist(s)	Farida Osman (EGY)	58.83	GR
2nd place, silver medalist(s)	Vanessa Mohr (RSA)	1:00.26	
3rd place, bronze medalist(s)	Rita Naude (RSA)	1:03.86	
4	Asma Sammoud (TUN)	1:04.11	
5	Emily Muteti (KEN)	1:04.18	
6	Tarryn Rennie (ZIM)	1:04.60	
7	Mariam Sakr (EGY)	1:05.33	
8	Ana Nobrega (ANG)	1:05.46	
