= Swimming at the 2015 African Games – Men's 50 metre butterfly =

Men's 50 metre butterfly at the 2015 African Games
- Venue: Kintele Aquatic Complex
- Date: September 8, 2015
- Competitors: 31 from 21 nations

Medalists
| gold medal | Chad le Clos | South Africa |
| silver medal | Omar Eissa | Egypt |
| bronze medal | Ahmed Bahgat | Egypt |

The Men's 50 metre butterfly event at the 2015 African Games took place on 8 September 2015 at Kintele Aquatic Complex.

== Schedule ==
All times are Congo Standard Time (UTC+01:00)

| Date | Time | Event |
|---|---|---|
| Tuesday, 8 September 2015 | 10:30 | Heat 1 |
| Tuesday, 8 September 2015 | 10:33 | Heat 2 |
| Tuesday, 8 September 2015 | 10:36 | Heat 3 |
| Tuesday, 8 September 2015 | 10:39 | Heat 4 |
| Tuesday, 8 September 2015 | 18:00 | Final |

== Results ==
=== Heats ===
The heats were held on 8 September.

=== Final ===
The final were held on 8 September.

| Rank | Athlete | Time | Notes |
|---|---|---|---|
| 1st place, gold medalist(s) | Chad le Clos (RSA) | 23.51 | |
| 2nd place, silver medalist(s) | Omar Eissa (EGY) | 24.18 | |
| 3rd place, bronze medalist(s) | Ahmed Bahgat (EGY) | 24.94 | |
| 4 | Alard Basson (RSA) | 24.97 | |
| 5 | Peter Wetzlar (ZIM) | 25.14 | |
| 6 | Ralph Goveia (ZAM) | 25.25 | |
| 7 | Thibaut Amani Danho (CIV) | 25.38 | |
| 8 | Issa Abdellah (KEN) | 25.86 | |
