= Swimming at the 2015 African Games – Men's 100 metre butterfly =

Men's 100 metre butterfly at the 2015 African Games
- Venue: Kintele Aquatic Complex
- Date: September 7, 2015
- Competitors: 21 from 16 nations

Medalists
| gold medal | Chad le Clos | South Africa |
| silver medal | Omar Eissa | Egypt |
| bronze medal | Nico Meyer | South Africa |

The Men's 200 metre butterfly event at the 2015 African Games took place on 7 September 2015 at Kintele Aquatic Complex.

== Schedule ==
All times are Congo Standard Time (UTC+01:00)

| Date | Time | Event |
|---|---|---|
| Monday, 7 September 2015 | 10:00 | Heat 1 |
| Monday, 7 September 2015 | 10:03 | Heat 2 |
| Monday, 7 September 2015 | 17:15 | Final |

== Results ==
=== Heats ===
The heats were held on 7 September.

=== Final ===
The final were held on 7 September.

| Rank | Athlete | Time | Notes |
|---|---|---|---|
| 1st place, gold medalist(s) | Chad le Clos (RSA) | 51.24 | GR |
| 2nd place, silver medalist(s) | Omar Eissa (EGY) | 53.54 | |
| 3rd place, bronze medalist(s) | Nico Meyer (RSA) | 55.26 | |
| 4 | Ahmed Bahgat (EGY) | 55.38 | |
| 5 | Peter Wetzlar (ZIM) | 55.57 | |
| 6 | Igor Mogne (MOZ) | 56.25 | |
| 7 | Ralph Goveia (ZAM) | 56.38 | |
| 8 | Mathieu Marquet (MRI) | 57.16 | |
