= Swimming at the 2015 African Games – Women's 200 metre backstroke =

Women's 200 metre backstroke at the 2015 African Games
- Venue: Kintele Aquatic Complex
- Date: September 11, 2015
- Competitors: 8 from 6 nations

Medalists
gold medal	Kirsty Coventry	Zimbabwe
silver medal	Karin Prinsloo	South Africa
bronze medal	Rim Ouennich	Tunisia

The women's 200 metre backstroke event at the 2015 African Games took place on 11 September 2015 at Kintele Aquatic Complex.

== Schedule ==
All times are Congo Standard Time (UTC+01:00)

Date	Time	Event
Friday, 11 September 2015	17:20	Final

== Results ==
=== Final ===
Rank	Athlete	Time	Notes
1st place, gold medalist(s)	Kirsty Coventry (ZIM)	2:13.29	
2nd place, silver medalist(s)	Karin Prinsloo (RSA)	2:14.31	
3rd place, bronze medalist(s)	Rim Ouennich (TUN)	2:20.16	NR
4	Alexus Laird (SEY)	2:20.70	
5	Asma Sammoud (TUN)	2:26.96	
6	Malk Alnady (EGY)	2:29.01	
7	Mariam Sakr (EGY)	NP	
8	Talisa Lanoe (KEN)	NP	
