= Swimming at the 2015 African Games – Women's 100 metre backstroke =

Women's 100 metre backstroke at the 2015 African Games
- Venue: Kintele Aquatic Complex
- Date: September 8, 2015
- Competitors: 14 from 10 nations

Medalists
gold medal	Kirsty Coventry	Zimbabwe
silver medal	Karin Prinsloo	South Africa
bronze medal	Jessica Ashley Cooper	South Africa

The women's 100 metre backstroke event at the 2015 African Games took place on 8 September 2015 at Kintele Aquatic Complex.

== Schedule ==
All times are Congo Standard Time (UTC+01:00)

Date	Time	Event
Tuesday, 8 September 2015	10:16	Heat 1
Tuesday, 8 September 2015	10:19	Heat 2
Tuesday, 8 September 2015	17:20	Final

== Results ==
=== Heats ===
Rank	Heat	Athlete	Time	Notes
1	2	Kirsty Coventry (ZIM)	1:02.20	Q
2	2	Karin Prinsloo (RSA)	1:02.74	Q
3	1	Jessica Ashley Cooper (RSA)	1:04.85	Q
4	1	Naomi Ruele (BOT)	1:05.38	Q
5	2	Alexus Laird (SEY)	1:05.47	Q
6	2	Rim Ouennich (TUN)	1:05.66	Q
7	1	Mariam Sakr (EGY)	1:05.92	Q
8	1	Heather Arseth (MRI)	1:07.59	Q
9	2	Talisa Lanoe (KEN)	1:08.54	
10	1	Malk Alnady (EGY)	1:09.19	
11	1	Anita Field (KEN)	1:10.49	
12	1	Shannon Hassen (ZAM)	1:12.74	
13	2	Jannat Bique (MOZ)	1:17.23	
14	2	Asma Sammoud (TUN)	DQ	

=== Final ===
Rank	Athlete	Time	Notes
1st place, gold medalist(s)	Kirsty Coventry (ZIM)	1:01.15	
2nd place, silver medalist(s)	Karin Prinsloo (RSA)	1:02.53	
3rd place, bronze medalist(s)	Jessica Ashley Cooper (RSA)	1:03.32	
4	Rim Ouennich (TUN)	1:05.16	
5	Naomi Ruele (BOT)	1:05.33	
6	Alexus Laird (SEY)	1:05.45	
7	Mariam Sakr (EGY)	1:05.97	
8	Heather Arseth (MRI)	1:07.49	
