= Swimming at the 2015 African Games – Men's 50 metre breaststroke =

Men's 50 metre breaststroke at the 2015 African Games
- Venue: Kintele Aquatic Complex
- Date: September 7, 2015
- Competitors: 24 from 16 nations

Medalists
gold medal	Cameron van der Burgh	South Africa
silver medal	Youssef El Kamash	Egypt
bronze medal	Wassim Elloumi	Tunisia

The Men's 50 metre breaststroke event at the 2015 African Games took place on 7 September 2015 at Kintele Aquatic Complex.

== Schedule ==
All times are Congo Standard Time (UTC+01:00)

Date	Time	Event
Monday, 7 September 2015	10:26	Heat 1
Monday, 7 September 2015	10:28	Heat 2
Monday, 7 September 2015	10:30	Heat 3
Monday, 7 September 2015	17:48	Final

== Results ==
=== Heats ===
The heats were held on 7 September.

=== Final ===
The final were held on 7 September.

Rank	Athlete	Time	Notes
1st place, gold medalist(s)	Cameron van der Burgh (RSA)	27.18	
2nd place, silver medalist(s)	Youssef El Kamash (EGY)	28.10	
3rd place, bronze medalist(s)	Wassim Elloumi (TUN)	28.62	
4	Abdelkader Mohamme Afane (ALG)	28.75	
5	Malick Fall (SEN)	28.93	
6	Alaric Basson (RSA)	28.98	
7	James Lawson (ZIM)	29.14	
8	Eihab Elfar (EGY)	29.26	
