= Swimming at the 2015 African Games – Men's 400 metre Individual medley =

Men's 400 metre Individual medley at the 2015 African Games
- Venue: Kintele Aquatic Complex
- Date: September 7, 2015
- Competitors: 5 from 4 nations

Medalists
gold medal	Ayrton Sweeney	South Africa
silver medal	Pedro Pinotes	Angola
bronze medal	Ahmed Hamdy	Egypt

The men's 400 metre individual medley event at the 2015 African Games took place on 7 September 2015 at the Kintele Aquatic Complex.

== Schedule ==
All times are Congo Standard Time (UTC+01:00)

Date	Time	Event
Friday, 7 September 2015	17:18	Final

== Results ==
=== Final ===
The final were held on 7 September.

Rank	Athlete	Time	Notes
1st place, gold medalist(s)	Ayrton Sweeney (RSA)	4:21.83	
2nd place, silver medalist(s)	Pedro Pinotes (ANG)	4:23.12	
3rd place, bronze medalist(s)	Ahmed Hamdy (EGY)	4:23.87	
4	Ahmed Mathlouthi (TUN)	4:25.40	
5	Edward Johannisen (RSA)	4:58.74	
