= Myles Brown =

South African swimmer (born 1992)

Personal information
- Nationality: South African
- Born: Devon Myles William Brown; 21 May 1992 (age 34)
- Height: 188 cm (6 ft 2 in)
- Weight: 80 kg (176 lb)

Sport
- Country: South Africa
- Sport: Swimming
Medal record
Representing South Africa
Commonwealth Games
Bronze medal – third place	2014 Glasgow	4x200m freestyle relay
African Games
Gold medal – first place	2015 Brazzaville	200m freestyle
Gold medal – first place	2015 Brazzaville	4x100m freestyle relay
Silver medal – second place	2015 Brazzaville	400m freestyle
Bronze medal – third place	2015 Brazzaville	800m freestyle

Devon Myles William Brown (born 21 May 1992) is a South African swimmer who attended Highbury Preparatory School in Hillcrest, and Kearsney College in Botha's Hill.

He competed at the 2014 FINA World Swimming Championships (25 m), at the 2015 World Aquatics Championships, and at the 2016 Summer Olympics in Rio de Janeiro. At the 2016 Summer Olympics, he competed in the 200 m freestyle and 400 m freestyle events. In the 200 m freestyle event, he finished 13th in the heats with a time of 1:46.78 and qualified for the semifinals where he finished 12th with a time of 1:46.57 and did not advance to the final. In the 400 m freestyle event, he finished 12th in the heats with a time of 3:45.92 and did not qualify for the final. He was also part of South Africa's 4 × 200 m freestyle relay team which finished 10th in the heats and did not qualify for the final. Brown was part of the 4 × 100 m medley relay team that finished 13th in the heats and did not qualify for the final.
