= Catarina Sousa =

Angolan swimmer (born 2000)

Personal information
- Nationality: Angolan
- Born: 27 April 2000 (age 26)

Sport
- Sport: Swimming
- Strokes: freestyle, backstroke
- Club: Benfica
Medal record
Women's swimming
Representing Angola
African Championships
Bronze medal – third place	2021 Accra	200 m freestyle

Catarina Sousa (born 27 April 2000) is an Angolan swimmer. She competed in the women's 50 metre backstroke event at the 2017 World Aquatics Championships. In 2019, she represented Angola at the 2019 African Games held in Rabat, Morocco.

She competed in the women's 100m freestyle event at the 2020 Summer Olympics. She swam a time of 59.35 in her heat and finished in 47th place overall.
