= Salvador Gordo =

Angolan swimmer (born 2003)

Personal information
- Full name: Salvador Vieira Gordo
- Nationality: Angolan
- Born: 7 January 2003 (age 23) Luanda, Angola
- Height: 5 ft 4 in (163 cm)
- Weight: 150 lb (68 kg)

Sport
- Sport: Swimming
- Strokes: Butterfly
- Club: Plymouth Leander Swimming; Sporting Clube de Portugal; Clube Desportivo Primeiro de Agosto
- College team: University of Tampa

Salvador Vieira Gordo (born January 7th 2003) is an Angolan swimmer. He competed for Angola at the 2020 Summer Olympics in the men's 100m butterfly event. He finished in 54th place overall with a time of 55.96 in his heat.

He has committed to swimming at the University of Tampa in the United States.
