= Ana Sofia Nóbrega =

Portuguese-Angolan swimmer

Personal information
- Nationality: Portuguese-Angolan
- Born: 20 December 1990 (age 35) Vila Real, Portugal
- Height: 1.74 m (5 ft 9 in)
- Weight: 70 kg (154 lb)

Sport
- Sport: Swimming
- Club: Primeiro de Agosto (Angola); Ginasio Clube Vila Real (Portugal)

Ana Sofia Nóbrega (born 20 December 1990) is a Portuguese-Angolan swimmer. She competed in the women's 100 metre freestyle event at the 2016 Summer Olympics where she ranked 40th with a time of 59.23 seconds. She did not advance to the semifinals. She competed at the 2015 African Games.
