= Flag of Angola =

Republic of Angola
- Use: National flag and ensign
- Proportion: 2:3
- Adopted: 11 November 1975; 51 years ago
- Design: Horizontal bicolour of red and black, charged in the center with a yellow emblem consisting of a machete crossed by a half-cogwheel and crowned with a five-pointed star
- Designed by: Henrique de Carvalho Santos

The national flag of Angola is a horizontal bicolour of red and black, charged in the center with a yellow emblem consisting of a machete crossed by a half-cogwheel and crowned with a five-pointed star. It was adopted on 11 November 1975, when Angola became independent from Portugal following the thirteen-year Angolan War of Independence. The original meanings of the flag's colours and symbols accordingly referenced the war and colonial period, but they have since been reinterpreted to represent the Angolan people and society more broadly.

The flag's design is outlined in the Constitution of Angola, and regulations regarding its use are outlined in the Angolan government's manual of graphic and protocol standards for national symbols. Henrique de Carvalho Santos is credited with designing the national flag, which is based on the flag of the MPLA (People's Movement for the Liberation of Angola), the country's ruling party since independence.

== Design and symbolism ==
Annex I of the Angolan constitution outlines the design of the flag and gives its colours and symbols significance. The flag is a horizontal bicolour consisting of a red upper band and a black lower band. Black represents Africa, while red represents the blood shed by Angolans during the colonial period, the war of independence and in defence of the country. The flag is charged in the center with a machete crossed by a half-cogwheel and crowned with a five-pointed star. The machete represents peasants, agriculture, and the war of independence; the half-cogwheel represents workers and industry; and the star represents international solidarity and progress. The charge is yellow, which symbolises the wealth of Angola. In the original constitution of 1975, "defence of the country" was "revolution", and "international solidarity" was "internationalism". American vexillologist Whitney Smith notes that the Angolan flag's charge is similar to the star, hammer and sickle of the Soviet flag.

=== Construction ===
Parameters in which the flag should be constructed are specified in section 2.1 of the Angolan government's manual of graphic and protocol standards for national symbols. The position and size of the emblem and bands should match the construction sheet shown in the manual; any other arrangement is considered a distortion, alteration or misrepresentation. The manual outlines standard dimensions for physical flags, but any dimensions are acceptable as long as the width-to-length ratio is 2:3. The manual also specifies the particular shades of the flag's colours: Angola red, Angola yellow and process black.

Construction sheet of the flag of Angola

Standard dimensions of the flag of Angola
	Dimensions
Small	0.51 m × 0.80 m (1 ft 8 in × 2 ft 7 in)
Medium	0.83 m × 1.3 m (2 ft 9 in × 4 ft 3 in)
Large	1.4 m × 2.2 m (4 ft 7 in × 7 ft 3 in)

Standard colours of the flag of Angola
	Angola red	Angola yellow	Process black
CMYK	20/100/90/0	0/15/100/0	10/10/10/100
Pantone	186 C	116 C	Black 6 C
RGB	204/9/47	255/203/0	0/0/0
Hexadecimal	#CC092F	#FFCB00	#000000

== Protocol ==
The Angolan flag is protected under Angolan law; improper use or handling of the flag is considered a criminal offence. Section 2.1 of the Angolan government's manual on protocol standards for national symbols outlines regulations regarding the display and handling of the flag.

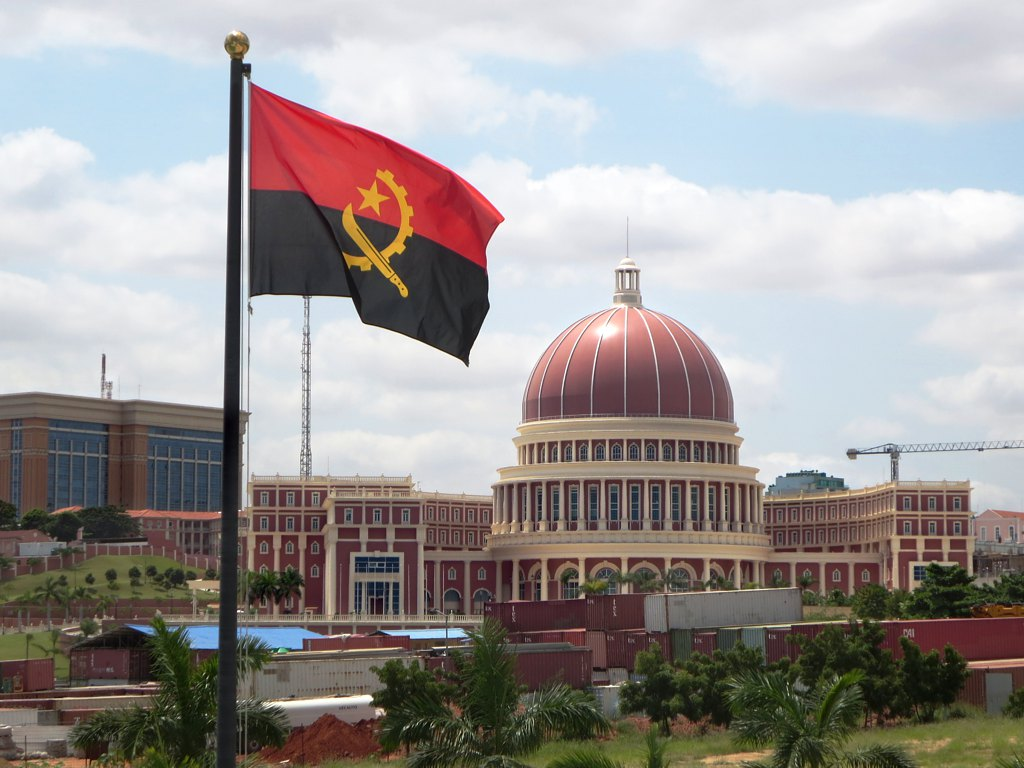
The Angolan flag flying outside the National Assembly building in Luanda

Any institution or individual may fly the flag as long as they properly observe the procedures and protocols outlined in the manual. Public institutions should fly the flag outside their respective headquarters. In general, the flag should be raised on Sundays, public holidays and days when official ceremonies or observances are held. The Angolan president, National Assembly and courts may order the flag to be raised on any other day. Government institutions should raise the flag outside of their headquarters daily. The flag must remain hoisted from 9 a.m. until sunset and, when flown at night, be illuminated by projectors if possible. During periods of national mourning, the national flag and any other flags flown alongside it should also be lowered to half-mast. The flag must be raised to the end of the flagpole before it is lowered to half-mast; the same procedure is followed when lowering the flag from half-mast. On flagpoles with lintels, the flag should be hoisted at the top of the flagpole or on the right side if the top has not been prepared for use.

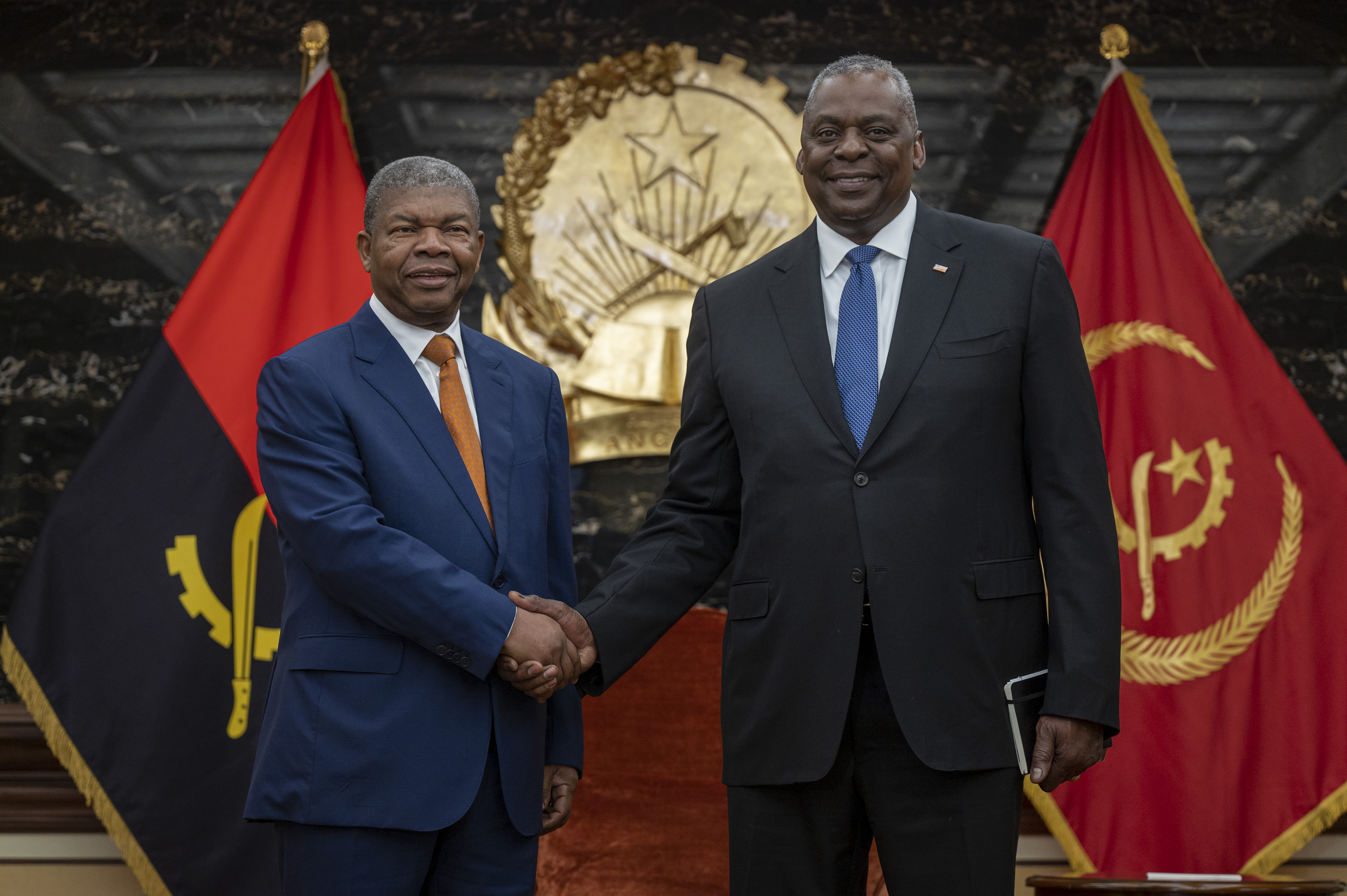
Angolan president João Lourenço shaking hands with US defence secretary Lloyd Austin at the Angolan presidential palace in 2023

The national flag should be displayed more prominently than other flags of the state and foreign flags. The national flag should not be smaller than flags displayed alongside it. When there are two flagpoles, the national flag occupies the left flagpole from the perspective of the observer. When there are three flagpoles, the national flag occupies the middle one. When there are more than three flagpoles inside a building, the national flag occupies the center one for odd numbers and the first left-of-center one for even numbers. When there are more than three flagpoles outdoors, the national flag occupies the first flagpole on the left, followed by all other flags to the right. If there are multiple flagpoles of differing heights, the national flag should be flown on the tallest one. The tallest flagpole must also be positioned in accordance with the other regulations related to the display of the national flag. The Angolan government may make exceptions to these requirements if the national flag is flown by an international organisation or at an international meeting on Angolan soil. In general, flagpoles should be "placed in an honourable location" on the ground, on building facades, or at the top of a building.

In digital representations, the flag's legibility and contrast should be maximised when displaying it on a solid colour background or in the foreground of a photograph. To this end, the manual recommends a border around the flag with a width equal to twice the diameter of the star on the flag.

== Presidential standard ==
Standard of the president of Angola

The standard of the president of Angola is a red field charged in the center with the same emblem on the national flag, albeit with two yellow olive branches below it. As with the national flag, the colours are Angola red and Angola yellow. The width-to-length ratio is 2:3.

The presidential standard indicates the presence of the Angolan president. It is always present in the presidential palace, which serves as the president's official residence. It is also displayed on the official presidential vehicle at a reduced size. The presidential standard must always be displayed next to the national flag.

== History ==
=== Adoption ===
Angola flew the flag of Portugal during the Portuguese colonial period. The Angolan War of Independence (1961–1974) was ended by the success of the Carnation Revolution in Portugal, which saw the installation of a military council in favour of decolonisation. António da Silva Cardoso was appointed to oversee Angola's transition to independence. At noon on 10 November 1975, the Portuguese flag was lowered in the capital Luanda, and Cardoso departed for Portugal with the remaining Portuguese colonial officials and soldiers. Before leaving, Cardoso transferred sovereignty over Angola to the Angolan people, instead of a particular movement. The MPLA (People's Movement for the Liberation of Angola), one of several groups that fought in the war, proclaimed the independence of the People's Republic of Angola the following midnight, on 11 November. During the proclamation ceremony, a new national flag based on the MPLA's flag was raised. According to senior MPLA member Hermínio Escórcio, fellow cadre Henrique de Carvalho Santos (Henrique Onambwé) was responsible for the design, and the first physical flag was created by two other cadres named Joaquina and Cici.

Parts of the country, however, remained under the control of other independence movements, notably UNITA (National Union for the Total Independence of Angola), which was opposed to the MPLA and proclaimed the rival Democratic People's Republic of Angola the same day. The Portuguese flag was likewise lowered in UNITA's capital of Huambo, but the UNITA flag was raised in its place rather than the flag chosen by the MPLA. UNITA continued flying its own flag in territory it controlled throughout the Angolan Civil War (1975–2002).

Flags of the MPLA and UNITA
Flag	Group	Description
	MPLA	A horizontal bicolour consisting of a red upper band and a black lower band, charged in the center with a yellow five-pointed star. The symbolism of the colours is the same as that of the Angolan flag. American vexillologist Whitney Smith suggests that the design may have been derived from the flag of the National Liberation Front of South Vietnam (Viet Cong), from which the MPLA adopted principles and strategies.
	UNITA	A horizontal triband consisting of a green central band sandwiched between two red bands. It is charged in the center with a black silhouette of a crowing rooster and on the right with a red silhouette of a rising sun with 16 rays. Red represents the blood shed by Angolans in anti-colonial actions before the war of independence, while green represents hope and faith in victory. The rooster symbolises "a call upon the peoples of Africa to become aware of the foreign nomination of Africa". The rising sun represents the start of the war of independence and the unity of Angola's 16 provinces in the war.

=== 2003 flag change proposal ===
2003 proposed flag of Angola

The Angolan Civil War ended in 2002 with a ceasefire and the disarmament of UNITA troops. The war's end brought about the prospect of adopting new national symbols, which was debated by deputies of the newly established constitutional commission of the National Assembly. A public competition was held, and a proposal submitted under the pseudonym Catica was selected as the winning design. Catica was to be awarded with a medal and US$20,000 in Angolan kwanza. However, the proposed flag was not adopted amid public disagreements about the change. The state-run Angola Press News Agency reported concerns about losing the existing flag's independence-related symbolism and its similarities to other national flags. In contrast, the agency also reported support from opposition deputies of UNITA and the PLD, who considered the design politically neutral.

The proposed flag consisted of a horizontal red strip bordered above and below by a thin white strip and a broad blue strip. It was charged in the center with a yellow sun consisting of three concentric circles and fifteen rays. The sun's design was based on ancient rock paintings located in the Tchitundu-Hulu historical site of Namibe Province. The flag's width-to-length ratio was 2:3. Ana Maria de Oliveira, the MPLA deputy who was responsible for coordinating the subcommission for the national symbols, explained the flag's significance: "The blue strips represent freedom, justice and solidarity, whereas the white ones stand for peace, unity and harmony. The red strip represents sacrifice, tenacity and heroism, whereas the sun represents the historical and cultural identity and riches of Angola."

== Bandeira-Monumento ==
The Fortress of São Miguel, which houses Angola's Museum of the Armed Forces, is the location of a 40-kilogram (88 lb) flag named the Bandeira-Monumento (lit. 'Flag-Monument'). It measures 12 by 18 metres (39 ft × 59 ft) and is the largest physical flag of Angola. On certain dates, (Note: The full list of dates is: 4 January – Day of the Martyrs of the Colonial Repression of Baixa do Cassange; 4 February – Start of the Angolan War of Independence; 8 March – International Women's Day; 4 April – Day of Peace and National Reconciliation (end of the Angolan Civil War); 1 May – International Workers' Day; 25 May – Africa Day; First Sunday of July; First Sunday of August; 17 September – Founder of the Nation and National Hero Day; First Sunday of October; 11 November – Independence Day; 25 December – Christmas and Family Day) it is hoisted on a 75-metre (246 ft)-tall flagpole weighing 20 tonnes, which rests on a reinforced concrete base 1.5 metres (4 ft 11 in) in diameter. It was hoisted for the first time on 4 April 2013, in a ceremony presided by then president José Eduardo dos Santos. The flag and its flagpole can withstand winds of up to 200 kilometres per hour (124 mph).

== See also ==
- List of Angolan flags
