= Angolan Swimming Federation =

Sports governing body in Angola

CANA
- Association crest
- Founded: 1976
- FINA affiliation: 1980
- CANA affiliation: xxxx
- Website: fan.lagodeideias.com
- President: Antonio Pedro Garcia Monteiro

The Angolan Swimming Federation (Portuguese: Federação Angolana de Natação), is the national governing body for the sport of swimming in Angola.
