= Pedro Pinotes =

Angolan swimmer (born 1989)

Personal information
- Full name: Pedro Miguel Pinotes
- Born: September 30, 1989 (age 36) Luanda, Angola

Sport
- Sport: Swimming
Medal record
Representing Angola
African Games
| Silver medal – second place | 2015 Brazzaville | 200m individual medley |
| Bronze medal – third place | 2011 Maputo | 200m butterfly |

Pedro Miguel Pinotes (born 30 September 1989) is an Angolan swimmer who competes in the Men's 400m individual medley. At the 2012 Summer Olympics he finished 30th overall in the heats in the Men's 400 metre individual medley and failed to reach the semi-final. At the 2016 Summer Olympics in Rio de Janeiro, he competed in the men's 400 m individual medley. He finished 25th in the heats and did not advance to the semi-final.
