= Tunisia at the 2011 All-Africa Games =

- IOC code: TUN
- NOC: Tunisian Olympic Committee

in Maputo
- Medals Ranked 4th: Gold 29 Silver 26 Bronze 13 Total 68

All-Africa Games appearances (overview)
- 1965; 1973; 1978; 1987; 1991; 1995; 1999; 2003; 2007; 2011; 2015; 2019; 2023

Youth appearances
- 2010

Tunisia, participated at the 2011 All-Africa Games held in the city of Maputo, Mozambique. She won 68 medals; 29 gold, 26 silver and 13 bronze., and she finished the competition in the 4th position.

== Medal summary ==
=== Medal table ===
Sport	Gold	Silver	Bronze	Total
Athletics	7	8	2	17
Boxing	1	2	0	3
Canoeing	3	4	1	8
Chess				
Cycling				
Football				
Handball				
Judo	6	0	1	7
Karate	2	3	3	8
Sailing	1	0	0	1
Swimming	4	7	2	13
Table tennis				
Taekwondo	3	2	0	5
Tennis	2	1	0	3
Volleyball				
Total	29	26	13	68

== Medal winners ==
=== Boxing ===
Event	Gold	Silver	Bronze
Lightweight (– 60 kilograms)	Ahmed Mejri (TUN)	Nogen Mmoloki (BOT)	Jean Richard Colin (MRI); Abdon Mewoli (CMR)
Light Welterweight (– 64 kilograms)	Richarno Colin (MRI)	Abderrazak Houya (TUN)	Gomotsang Gaasite (BOT); Mbenge Thulani (RSA)
Super Heavyweight (+ 91 kilograms)	Kamel Rahmani (ALG)	Aymen Trabelsi (TUN)	Tshisekedi Mbiya (COD); Schaffer Paolo (RSA)

== Athletics ==
In athletics, Tunisia finished the competition in the 6th position with 6 medals; 3 golds and 3 silvers.

Chaima Trabelsi won the gold medal in 20 km walk event, with a new All-Africa Games record in 1:40:35.

=== Men ===
Event	Gold		Silver		Bronze	
20 km walk	Hassanin Sbei (TUN)	1:24:53	Hedi Teraoui (TUN)	1:26:44	Gabriel Ngintedem (CMR)	1:32:08

=== Women ===
Event	Gold		Silver		Bronze	
20 km walk	Chaima Trabelsi (TUN)	1:40.35 GR	Olfa Lafi (TUN)	1:41.25	Aynalem Eshitu (ETH)	1:42:19
Pole vault	Dora Mahfoudhi (TUN)	3.60	Alima Ouattara (CIV)	3.20	No mark	
Hammer throw	Ami Sene (SEN)	61.48	Sarra Ben Saad (TUN)	59.65	Rana Ahmed Ibrahim (EGY)	58.57

== Para-sport events ==
=== Men ===
Event	Gold		Silver		Bronze	
100m T37	Sofiane Hamdi (ALG)	11.84	Fathallah Mostafa (EGY)	12.09	Mohamed Charmi (TUN)	12.83
400m T12	Nzuzgi Mwendo Henry (KEN)	49.82	Mahmoud Khaldi (TUN)	50.01	Adesoji Ademeora (NGA)	50.66
400m T37	Sofiane Hamdi (ALG)	54.89	Mohamed Charmi (TUN)	55.85	Madjid Djemai (ALG)	56.81
800m T37	Mohamed Charmi (TUN)	2:06.90	Madjid Djemai (ALG)	2:16.10	Sum Johnatan (KEN)	2:31.30
1500m T53/54	Ahmed Aouadi (TUN)	3:39.98	Alinco Omojola (NGA)	3:40.81	Henry Opiyoa (UGA)	3:45.84
Shot Put F37/38	Ibrahim Abdelwarth (EGY)	15.01	Hamdi Warfeli (TUN)	13.47	Ezikeipe Timipreye (NGR)	8.79

=== Women ===
Event	Gold		Silver		Bronze	
400m T11/12	Adewale Deborah (NGR)	57.09	Chouayah Najah (TUN)	60.97	Mary Awaza (NGR)	61.22
400m T54	Adewale Deborah (NGR)	1:01.36	Patricia N'Nanji (NGR)	1:03.16	Samira Berri (TUN)	1:03.47
1500m T53/54	Adjara Mohamed (GHA)	4:07.19	Samira Berri (TUN)	4:17.51	Anita Fordjour (GHA)	4:27.06
Discus Throw F32/33/34	Yousra Ben Jemaa (TUN)	22.69	Wadjda Benoumssad (ALG)	19.98	Mounia Kasmi (ALG)	9.80
Shot Put F40	Raoua Tlili (TUN)	9.15	Laurita Onye (NGA)	7.01	Fatiha Mahdi (ALG)	6.19

== Swimming ==
With 13 medals; 4 gold, 7 silver and 2 bronze, Tunisia finished the competition in the second rank in swimming which was dominated by South Africa team with 74 medals. The swimmer Ahmed Mathlouthi won three gold medals in 100m, 200m and 400m freestyle events with two game records.

=== Men's results ===
Event	Gold		Silver		Bronze	
200m freestyle	Ahmed Mathlouthi; Tunisia	1:48.95 GR	Darian Townsend; South Africa	1:49.04	Jean Basson; South Africa	1:51.06
400m freestyle	Ahmed Mathlouthi; Tunisia	3:54.03 GR	Riaan Schoeman; South Africa	3:58.49	Mark Randall; South Africa	3:59.82
800m freestyle	Ahmed Mathlouthi; Tunisia	8:10.00	Mark Randall; South Africa	8:10.04	Jasper Venter; South Africa	8:21.76
200m backstroke	Darren Murray; South Africa	2:01.74 GR	Charl Crous; South Africa	2:01.88	Taki Mrabet; Tunisia	2:05.19
100m breaststroke	Cameron van der Burgh; South Africa	1:02.44	Wassim Elloumi; Tunisia	1:03.17	Nabil Kebbab; Algeria	1:03.80
200m breaststroke	Taki Mrabet; Tunisia	2:16.51	Wassim Elloumi; Tunisia	2:18.58	Sofiane Daid; Algeria	2:19.74
200m I.M.	Chad le Clos; South Africa	2:00.70 GR	Darian Townsend; South Africa	2:01.76	Taki Mrabet; Tunisia	2:03.46
400m I.M.	Chad le Clos; South Africa	4:16.88 GR	Taki Mrabet; Tunisia	4:21.11	Riaan Schoeman; South Africa	4:25.32

=== Women's results ===
Event	Gold		Silver		Bronze	
200m freestyle	Karin Prinsloo; South Africa	1:59.84 GR	Zeineb Khalfallah; Tunisia	2:05.44	Natasha De Vos; South Africa	2:06.20
400m freestyle	Roxanne Tammadge; South Africa	4:19.73	Sarra Lejnef; Tunisia	4:20.75	Rene Warnes; South Africa	4:21.58
100m breaststroke	Suzaan van Biljon; South Africa	1:10.40	Sarra Lajnef; Tunisia	1:12.78	Samantha Welch; Zimbabwe	1:15.39
200m breaststroke	Suzaan van Biljon; South Africa		Sarra Lajnef; Tunisia		Kathryn Meaklim; South Africa	

== Judo ==
Tunisia was the top ranked in medals table in Judo with 7 medals; 6 gold and one bronze.

=== Men's results ===
Event	Gold	Silver	Bronze
−66 kg	Ahmed Awad (EGY)	Youcef Nouari (ALG)	Hocem Khalfaoui (TUN); Siyabulela Mabulu (RSA)
+100 kg	Faicel Jaballah (TUN)	Islam El Shebaby (EGY)	Joseph Bebeze (CMR); Bilal Zouani (ALG)

=== Women's results ===
Event	Gold	Silver	Bronze
−48 kg	Amani Khalfaoui (TUN)	Sandrine Ilendou (GAB)	Franka Audu (NGA); Sabrina Saidi (ALG)
−57 kg	Nesria Jelassi (TUN)	Hortense Diedhiou (SEN)	Grace Deutcho (CMR); Raissa Lebomie (NGR)
−70 kg	Houda Miled (TUN)	Antonia Moreira (ANG)	Mbala Felicité (CMR); Winifred Gofit (NGR)
−78 kg	Hana Mareghni (TUN)	Honorine Mafeguim (CMR)	Amina Temmar (ALG); Georgette Sagna (CMR)
+78 kg	Nihel Chikhrouhou (TUN)	Sonia Asselah (ALG)	Monica Sagna (SEN); Dechantal Fokou (CMR)

== Karate ==
=== Men's result ===
Event	Gold	Silver	Bronze
−75 kg	Addou Lahat Cisse (SEN)	Marouene Khammassi (TUN)	Walid Nouaaboub (ALG); Nigeria
−84 kg	Hany Keshta (EGY)	Mahdi Dahmouni (TUN)	Cameroon; South Africa
Kumite team	Egypt	Republic of the Congo	Democratic Republic of the Congo; Tunisia

=== Women's result ===
Event	Gold	Silver	Bronze
−55 kg	Ilhem Eldjou (ALG)	Dhouha Ben Othmane (TUN)	Botswana; Senegal
−61 kg	Boutjaina Hasnaoui (TUN)	Mali	Democratic Republic of the Congo; Egypt
−68 kg	Faten Aissa (TUN)	Egypt	Algeria; Cameroon
+68 kg	Blandine Angama (CMR)	Egypt	Senegal; Kaouther Hasnaoui (TUN)
Kumite team	Senegal	Egypt	Algeria; Tunisia

== Canoeing ==
In Canoeing, Tunisia finished the competition in the second position below South Africa with 8 medals; 3 golds, 4 silvers and a single bronze medal.

=== Slalom ===
Event	Gold	Silver	Bronze
Men's K-1	Donavan Wewege (RSA)	Nadjib Mazar (ALG)	Mrabet Mohamed Ali (TUN)
Women's K-1	Afef Ben Samil (TUN)	Lilian Japhet (RSA)	Madjiguène Seck (SEN)

=== Sprint ===
Men's result

Event	Gold	Silver	Bronze
C-1 200 metres	Khaled Bargaoui (TUN)	Calvin Gaebolae Mokoto (RSA)	Atalmiro Ferreira De Ceira (STP)
C-1 1000 metres	Calvin Gaebolae Mokoto (RSA)	Khaled Bargaoui (TUN)	Henriques Nelson (ANG)
K-1 200 metres	Greg Ricky Louw (RSA)	Mrabet Mohamed Ali (TUN)	Mostafa Said (EGY)
K-1 1000 metres	Mrabet Mohamed Ali (TUN)	Nicholas John Stubbs (RSA)	Ousmane Goudiam Fall (SEN)

Women's result

Event	Gold	Silver	Bronze
K-1 200 metres	Bridgitte Ellen Hartley (RSA)	Afef Ben Ismail (TUN)	Khatia Ba (SEN)
K-1 500 metres	Bridgitte Ellen Hartley (RSA)	Afef Ben Ismail (TUN)	Khatia Ba (SEN)
