= Tennis at the African Games =

- Tennis
- Frequency: Every four years
- Inaugurated: 1965 (Republic of the Congo) Brazzaville
- Most recent: 2023 (Ghana) Accra
- Best: Egypt (EGY)

Tennis was an African Games event at its inaugural edition in 1965 and has continued to feature prominently at the competition in each of its subsequent editions.

== Editions ==
| Games | Year | Host city | Events | | Host country |
| Games | Year | Host city | Men | Women | Host country |
|---|---|---|---|---|---|
| I | 1965 | (Republic of the Congo) Brazzaville | 2 | —N/a | United Arab Republic |
| II | 1973 | (Nigeria) Lagos | 2 | —N/a | Egypt |
| III | 1978 | (Algeria) Algiers | 2 | 2 | Nigeria |
| IV | 1987 | (Kenya) Nairobi | 2 | 2 | Zimbabwe |
| V | 1991 | (Egypt) Cairo | 2 | 2 | Zimbabwe |
| VI | 1995 | (Zimbabwe) Harare | 2 | 2 | South Africa |
| VII | 1999 | (South Africa) Johannesburg | 1 | 1 | South Africa |
| VIII | 2003 | (Nigeria) Abuja | 3 | 3 | Nigeria |
| IX | 2007 | (Algeria) Algiers | 3 | 3 | Algeria |
| X | 2011 | (Mozambique) Maputo | 3 | 3 | Egypt |
| XI | 2015 | (Republic of the Congo) Brazzaville | 3 | 3 | Egypt |
| XII | 2019 | (Morocco) Rabat | 3 | 3 | Egypt |
| XIII | 2023 | (Ghana) Accra | 3 | 3 | Tunisia |

== Events ==
| Event | 65 | 73 | 78 | 87 | 91 | 95 | 99 | 03 | 07 | 11 | 15 | 19 | Years |
|---|---|---|---|---|---|---|---|---|---|---|---|---|---|
| Men's singles | X | X | X | X | X | X | | X | X | X | X | X | 11 |
| Men's doubles | X | X | X | X | X | X | | X | X | X | X | X | 11 |
| Men's team | | | | | | | X | X | X | X | X | X | 6 |
| Women's singles | | | X | X | X | X | | X | X | X | X | X | 9 |
| Women's doubles | | | X | X | X | X | | X | X | X | X | X | 9 |
| Women's team | | | | | | | X | X | X | X | X | X | 6 |
| Total | 2 | 2 | 4 | 4 | 4 | 4 | 2 | 6 | 6 | 6 | 6 | 6 | 6 |

== Medal table ==
Last updated after the 2023 African Games

| Rank | Nation | Gold | Silver | Bronze | Total |
|---|---|---|---|---|---|
| 1 | Egypt (EGY) | 14 | 13 | 23 | 50 |
| 2 | Nigeria (NGR) | 7 | 11 | 16 | 34 |
| 3 | Algeria (ALG) | 7 | 4 | 6 | 17 |
| 4 | Tunisia (TUN) | 7 | 1 | 10 | 18 |
| 5 | South Africa (RSA) | 5 | 9 | 4 | 18 |
| 6 | Zimbabwe (ZIM) | 5 | 5 | 11 | 21 |
| 7 | Kenya (KEN) | 3 | 3 | 5 | 11 |
| 8 | Madagascar (MAD) | 2 | 3 | 6 | 11 |
| 9 | Ivory Coast (CIV) | 2 | 2 | 2 | 6 |
| 10 | Senegal (SEN) | 2 | 1 | 6 | 9 |
| 11 | (Democratic Republic of the Congo) DR Congo (COD) | 2 | 1 | 0 | 3 |
| 12 | Morocco (MAR) | 1 | 2 | 5 | 8 |
| 13 | Ghana (GHA) | 1 | 1 | 1 | 3 |
| 14 | Benin (BEN) | 0 | 1 | 0 | 1 |
| 14 | Republic of the Congo (CGO) | 0 | 1 | 0 | 1 |
| 16 | Lesotho (LES) | 0 | 0 | 1 | 1 |
| 16 | Mauritius (MRI) | 0 | 0 | 1 | 1 |
| 16 | Sierra Leone (SLE) | 0 | 0 | 1 | 1 |
| Totals (18 entries) | | 58 | 58 | 98 | 214 |

== Finals ==
=== Men's singles ===
| Year | Champions | Runners-up | Score |
|---|---|---|---|
| 1965 | Mustapha Belkhodja (TUN) | Mabrouk Ali (UAR) | |
| 1973 | Aly El Daoudi (EGY) | Thomson Onibokun (NGR) | |
| 1978 | David Imonitie (NGR) | Tony Mmoh (NGR) | |
| 1987 | Byron Black (ZIM) | Sadiq Abdullahi (NGR) | |
| 1991 | Jean-Christophe Nabi (CIV) | Claude N’Goran (CIV) | |
| 1995 | Grant Stafford (RSA) | Claude N’Goran (CIV) | |
| 2003 | Lamine Ouahab (ALG) | Raven Klaasen (RSA) | |
| 2007 | Lamine Ouahab (ALG) | Mohamed Mamoun (EGY) | |
| 2011 | Takanyi Garanganga (ZIM) | Sherif Sabry (EGY) | |
| 2015 | Dennis Inondo (COD) | Alexis Klegou (BEN) | |
| 2019 | Mohamed Safwat (EGY) | Karim-Mohamed Maamoun (EGY) | |

=== Women's singles ===
| Year | Champions | Runners-up | Score |
|---|---|---|---|
| 1978 | Jane Davies-Doxzon (KEN) | Susan Wakhungu (KEN) | |
| 1987 | Myriam Berthe (SEN) | Rolake Olagbegi (NGR) | |
| 1991 | Myriam Berthe (SEN) | Warda Bouchabou (ALG) | |
| 1995 | Dally Randriantefy (MAD) | Nannie De Villiers (RSA) | |
| 2003 | Clara Udofa (NGR) | Fadzai Mawisire (ZIM) | |
| 2007 | Samia Medjahdi (ALG) | Lizaan Du Plessis (RSA) | |
| 2011 | Ons Jabeur (TUN) | Chanel Simmonds (RSA) | |
| 2015 | Sandra Samir (EGY) | Zarah Razafimahatratra (MAD) | |
| 2019 | Mayar Sherif (EGY) | Chanel Simmonds (RSA) | |

=== Men's doubles ===
| Year | Champions | Runners-up | Score |
|---|---|---|---|
| 1965 | Ismail El Shafei (EGY); Fathi Mohamed Ali (EGY) | Saeed Cockar (KEN); Yashvin Shretta (KEN) | |
| 1973 | Aly El Daoudi (EGY); Ahmed Hassan (EGY) | Lawrence Awopegba (NGR); Yemisi Allan (NGR) | |
| 1978 | Nduka Odizor (NGR); David Imonitie (NGR) | Tony Mmoh (NGR); Kehinde Ajayi (NGR) | |
| 1987 | Byron Black (ZIM); Mark Gurr (ZIM) | Sadiq Abdullahi (NGR); Godwin Emeh (NGR) | |
| 1991 | Rashid Hassan (ZIM); Malcolm Birch (ZIM) | Franklyn Ofori (GHA); Kenneth Dowuona (GHA) | |
| 1995 | Grant Stafford (RSA); John-Laffnie de Jager (RSA) | Tamer Essawi (EGY); Amr Ghoneim (EGY) | |
| 2003 | Raven Klaasen (RSA); Willem Petrus Meyer (RSA) | Sunday Maku (NGR); Jonathan Igbinovia (NGR) | |
| 2007 | Lamine Ouahab (ALG); Slimane Saoudi (ALG) | Karim Maamoun (EGY); Mohamed Maamoun (EGY) | |
| 2011 | Clifford Enosoregbe (NGR); Onyeka Mbanu (NGR) | Candy Idoko (NGR); Lawal Shehu (NGR) | |
| 2015 | Wisdom Na Ajdrago (GHA); George Darko (GHA) | Denis Inondo (COD); Sarma Nkuluta (COD) | |
| 2019 | Aziz Dougaz (TUN); Skander Mansouri (TUN) | Adam Moundir (MAR); Lamine Ouahab (MAR) | |

=== Women's doubles ===
| Year | Champions | Runners-up | Score |
|---|---|---|---|
| 1978 | Jane Davies-Doxzon (KEN); Susan Wakhungu (KEN) | Samira Mahmoudi (ALG); Yamina Hassan (ALG) | |
| 1987 | Rolake Olagbegi (NGR); Veronica Oyibokia (NGR) | Myriam Berthe (SEN); Sadia Berthe (SEN) | |
| 1991 | Julia Muir (ZIM); Paula Iversen (ZIM) | Warda Bouchabou (ALG); Samira Mahmoudi (ALG) | |
| 1995 | Dally Randriantefy (MAD); Natacha Randriantefy (MAD) | Mareze Joubert (RSA); Nannie De Villiers (RSA) | |
| 2003 | Clara Udofa (NGR); Osaro Amadin (NGR) | Fadzai Mawisire (ZIM); Fadzai Masiyazi (ZIM) | |
| 2007 | Samia Medjahdi (ALG); Assia Halo (ALG) | Kelly Anderson (RSA); Lizaan Du Plessis (RSA) | |
| 2011 | Magy Mikhail (EGY); Mayar Sherif (EGY) | Ons Jabeur (TUN); Nour Abbes (TUN) | |
| 2015 | Ola Abou Zekry (EGY); Sandra Samir (EGY) | Dona Abuhabaga (EGY); Moura Ishak (EGY) | |
| 2019 | Rana Sherif Ahmed (EGY); Mayar Sherif (EGY) | Lamis Alhussein Abdel Aziz (EGY); Sandra Samir (EGY) | |
