= Tunisia at the 2007 All-Africa Games =

- IOC code: TUN
- NOC: Tunisian Olympic Committee

in Algiers
- Medals Ranked 5th: Gold 48 Silver 41 Bronze 58 Total 147

All-Africa Games appearances (overview)
- 1965; 1973; 1978; 1987; 1991; 1995; 1999; 2003; 2007; 2011; 2015; 2019; 2023; 2027

Youth appearances
- 2010

Tunisia, participated at the 2007 All-Africa Games held in Algiers, the capital city of Algeria. She won 147 medals.

== Medal summary ==
=== Medal table ===
| Sport | Gold | Silver | Bronze | Total |
|---|---|---|---|---|
| Athletics | | | | |
| Boxing | | | | |
| Canoeing | | | | |
| Chess | | | | |
| Cycling | | | | |
| Football | | | | |
| Handball | | | | |
| Judo | | | | |
| Karate | | | | |
| Sailing | | | | |
| Swimming | | | | |
| Table tennis | | | | |
| Taekwondo | | | | |
| Tennis | | | | |
| Volleyball | | | | |
| Total | 48 | 41 | 58 | 147 |

== See also ==
- Tunisia at the All-Africa Games
