= Tunisia at the 1991 All-Africa Games =

- IOC code: TUN
- NOC: Tunisian Olympic Committee

in Cairo
- Medals Ranked 6th: Gold 6 Silver 4 Bronze 10 Total 20

All-Africa Games appearances (overview)
- 1965; 1973; 1978; 1987; 1991; 1995; 1999; 2003; 2007; 2011; 2015; 2019; 2023

Youth appearances
- 2010

Tunisia, participated at the 1991 All-Africa Games held in Cairo, Egypt. She won 20 medals.

== Medal summary ==
=== Medal table ===
Sport	Gold	Silver	Bronze	Total
Athletics				
Boxing				
Canoeing				
Chess				
Cycling				
Football				
Handball				
Judo				
Karate				
Sailing				
Swimming				
Table tennis				
Taekwondo				
Tennis				
Volleyball				
Total				

== See also ==
- Tunisia at the All-Africa Games
