= Algeria at the 2011 All-Africa Games =

- IOC code: ALG
- NOC: Algerian Olympic Committee

in Maputo
- Competitors: 265 in 19 sports
- Medals Ranked 5th: Gold 22 Silver 29 Bronze 33 Total 84

All-Africa Games appearances (overview)
- 1965; 1973; 1978; 1987; 1991; 1995; 1999; 2003; 2007; 2011; 2015; 2019; 2023

Youth appearances
- 2010; 2014

Algeria, participated at the 2011 All-Africa Games held in the city of Maputo, Mozambique. It participated with 265 athletes in 19 sports and win 84 medals in the end of these games.

== Medal summary ==
=== Medal table ===
Sport	Gold	Silver	Bronze	Total
Athletics	7	6	6	19
Boxing	3	4	0	7
Canoeing	1	2	0	3
Chess	1	3	0	4
Cycling	0	0	2	2
Football	0	0	1	1
Handball	0	0	1	1
Judo	4	3	5	12
Karate	3	4	6	13
Sailing	0	0	1	1
Swimming	1	5	9	15
Table tennis	0	0	1	1
Taekwondo	1	1	0	2
Tennis	0	0	1	1
Volleyball	1	1	0	2
Total	22	29	33	84

==== Gold ====
Medal	Name	Sport	Event	Date
Gold	Taoufik Makhloufi	Athletics	800 m	
Gold	Othmane Hadj Lazib	Athletics	110 m hurdles	
Gold	Abderrahmane Hammadi	Athletics	400 m hurdles	
Gold	Larbi Bouraada	Athletics	Pole vault	
Gold	Baya Rahouli	Athletics	Triple jump	
Gold	Abdelhafid Benchabla	Boxing	Light Heavyweight	
Gold	Chouaib Boloudinet	Boxing	Heavyweight	
Gold	Kamel Rahmani	Boxing	Super Heavyweight	
Gold	Nadjib Mazar	Canoeing	Men's C-1	
Gold	Sabrina Latreche	Chess	Women	
Gold	Lyes Saker	Judo	−60 kg	
Gold	Larbi Grini	Judo	−73 kg	
Gold	Abderahmane Benamadi	Judo	−81 kg	
Gold	Soraya Haddad	Judo	−52 kg	
Gold	Abdelkrim Bouamria	Karate	−60kg	
Gold	Ilhem Eldjou	Karate	−55kg	
Gold	Algeria	Karate	Kata team	
Gold	Algeria	Volleyball	Women's	

== Athletics ==
Athlete	Event	Round 1			Semifinal			Final	
Athlete	Event	Heat	Time	Rank	Heat	Time	Rank	Time	Rank
Taoufik Makhloufi	800 metres				1	1:47.50	3 Q	1:46.32	1st place, gold medalist(s)
Taoufik Makhloufi	1500 metres				2	3:48.96	7 Q	3:39.99	3rd place, bronze medalist(s)
Othmane Hadj Lazib	110 metres hurdles							13.48 GR	1st place, gold medalist(s)
Abderrahmane Hammadi	400 metres hurdles				1	51.89	6 Q	50.48	1st place, gold medalist(s)

Athlete	Event	Final	
Athlete	Event	Result	Rank
Larbi Bouraada	pole vault	5:00	1st place, gold medalist(s)
Mourad Souissi	pole vault	4:00	2nd place, silver medalist(s)
Issam Nima	triple jump	16.54	2nd place, silver medalist(s)

Women

Athlete	Event	Final	
Athlete	Event	Result	Rank
Romaissa Belabioud	long jump	6.46 (+1.7)	3rd place, bronze medalist(s)
Baya Rahouli	triple jump	13.53	1st place, gold medalist(s)

== Basketball ==
=== Men ===
Pool matches

Group A

Qualified for the quarter-finals

Team	Pld	W	L	PF	PA	PD	Pts
Mozambique	4	3	1	282	258	+24	7
Nigeria	4	3	1	270	221	+49	7
Algeria	4	2	2	260	229	+31	6
Rwanda	4	1	3	270	273	−3	5
Mali	4	1	3	245	308	−63	5

19:30

Algeria	71–58	Mozambique

Pavilhão do Desportivo de Maputo, Maputo

15:30

Algeria	66–73	Mali
Scoring by quarter: 19-20, 15-19, 19-18, 13-16

Pavilhão do Desportivo de Maputo, Maputo

17:30

Nigeria	63–44	Algeria
Scoring by quarter: 17-19, 12-9, 20-3, 14-13

Pavilhão do Desportivo de Maputo, Maputo

14 September 2011
13:30

Rwanda	54–60	Algeria
Scoring by quarter: 11-16, 11-17, 21-9, 11-18

Pavilhão do Desportivo de Maputo, Maputo

==== Quarterfinals ====
17:30

Algeria	73–65	Cape Verde

Pavilhão do Maxaquene, Maputo

==== Semifinals ====
19:30

Mozambique	68–45	Algeria

Pavilhão do Maxaquene, Maputo

==== Bronze medal game ====
17 September 2011
17:30

Angola	74–58	Algeria

Pavilhão do Maxaquene, Maputo

=== Women ===
Pool matches

Group A

Qualified for the quarter-finals

Team	Pld	W	L	PF	PA	PD	Pts
Mozambique	5	5	0	316	249	+67	10
Nigeria	5	4	1	297	224	+73	9
Kenya	5	2	3	285	245	+40	7
Zimbabwe	5	2	3	263	281	−18	7
Algeria	5	1	4	235	337	−102	6
DR Congo	5	1	4	244	304	−60	6

2 September 2011
09:00

Algeria	40–48	Nigeria

Pavilhão do Desportivo de Maputo, Maputo

4 September 2011
11:00

Kenya	61–36	Algeria

Pavilhão do Desportivo de Maputo, Maputo

13:30

DR Congo	49–55	Algeria

17:30

Algeria	67–68	Mozambique

7 September 2011
09:00

Algeria	65–55	Zimbabwe

Pavilhão do Desportivo de Maputo, Maputo

== Football ==
=== Women ===
Pool matches

Group A

Team	Pld	W	D	L	GF	GA	GD	Pts
Cameroon	2	2	0	0	4	0	+4	6
Algeria	2	1	0	1	7	4	+3	3
Mozambique	2	0	0	2	1	8	−7	0
Guinea	withdrew							

- Guinea withdrew and Group A became a three-team group.
7 September 2011

Cameroon	3 – 0	Algeria
Manie 5'; Mihamle 45'; Beyene 84'	Report

Estádio do Maxaquene, Maputo

10 September 2011

Mozambique	1 – 7	Algeria
Mutola 42'	Report	Meflah 24'; Benziané 52', 76'; Bekhedda 60'; Marek 66', 69'; Yahi 90'

Estádio da Machava, Maputo

=== Semifinals ===
14 September 2011

Ghana	3 – 0	Algeria
Cudjoe 17', 24'; Myles 38'	Report

Estádio do Maxaquene, Maputo

=== Third-place play-off ===
16 September 2011

South Africa	0 – 3	Algeria
	Report	Zerrouki 6'; Benziané 50'; Marek 71'

Estádio do Maxaquene, Maputo

== Handball ==
=== Men ===
Pool matches

Group B

Team	Pld	W	D	L	GF	GA	GD	Pts
Algeria	2	1	0	1	56	50	+6	2
Senegal	2	1	0	1	50	53	−3	2
Gabon	2	1	0	1	48	51	−3	2

8 September 2011; 11:00	Algeria	31 – 24	Senegal
8 September 2011; 11:00		(16–11)

9 September 2011; 11:00	Algeria	25 – 26	Gabon
9 September 2011; 11:00		(12–12)

==== Quarterfinals ====
13 September 2011; 15:00	Algeria	36 – 16	Mozambique
13 September 2011; 15:00		(18–8)

==== Semifinals ====
15 September 2011; 19:30	Algeria	17 – 22	Egypt
15 September 2011; 19:30		(8–8)

==== Third place game ====
17 September 2011; 11:00	Senegal	24 – 25	Algeria
17 September 2011; 11:00		(10–11)

=== Women ===
Pool matches

Group A

Team	Pld	W	D	L	GF	GA	GD	Pts
Cameroon	2	2	0	0	62	44	+18	4
Algeria	2	1	0	1	56	45	+11	2
Senegal	2	0	0	2	37	66	−29	0

10 September 2011; 17:00	Cameroon	27 – 25	Algeria
10 September 2011; 17:00		(14–15)

11 September 2011; 09:00	Algeria	30 – 18	Senegal
11 September 2011; 09:00		(13–11)

==== Quarterfinals ====
14 September 2011; 15:00	Algeria	30 – 24	Cape Verde
14 September 2011; 15:00		(14–13)

==== Semifinals ====
15 September 2011; 16:30	Angola	32 – 18	Algeria
15 September 2011; 16:30		(13–9)

==== Third place game ====
17 September 2011; 09:00	Cameroon	26 – 20	Algeria
17 September 2011; 09:00		(11–12)

== Volleyball ==
=== Pool matches ===
Group B

Pos	Team	Pld	W	L	Pts	SW	SL	SR	SPW	SPL	SPR	Qualification
1	Algeria	3	3	0	9	9	3	3.000	295	266	1.109	Semifinals
2	Kenya	3	2	1	6	7	4	1.750	260	229	1.135	Semifinals
3	Nigeria	3	1	2	3	5	6	0.833	258	266	0.970	5th–8th place
4	South Africa	3	0	3	0	1	9	0.111	198	249	0.795	5th–8th place

Date		Score		Set 1	Set 2	Set 3	Set 4	Set 5	Total
2 Sep	Algeria	3–1	South Africa	25–20	25–19	22–25	25–19		97–83
3 Sep	Algeria	3–1	Kenya	25–20	25–19	22–25	25–21		94–87
4 Sep	Algeria	3–1	Nigeria	32–30	25–19	22–25	25–22		104–96

=== Semifinals ===
Date		Score		Set 1	Set 2	Set 3	Set 4	Set 5	Total
6 Sep	Algeria	3–0	Rwanda	25–21	25–16	30–28			80–65

=== Final ===
Date		Score		Set 1	Set 2	Set 3	Set 4	Set 5	Total
7 Sep	Cameroon	3–2	Algeria	23–25	25–22	25–17	21–25	15–11	109–100

=== Pool matches ===
Group B

Pos	Team	Pld	W	L	Pts	SW	SL	SR	SPW	SPL	SPR	Qualification
1	Algeria	3	3	0	9	9	2	4.500	268	200	1.340	Semifinals
2	Cameroon	3	2	1	6	7	5	1.400	269	259	1.039	Semifinals
3	Senegal	3	1	2	3	4	7	0.571	225	245	0.918	5th–8th place
4	Botswana	3	0	3	0	3	9	0.333	226	284	0.796	5th–8th place

Date		Score		Set 1	Set 2	Set 3	Set 4	Set 5	Total
2 Sep	Algeria	3–1	Botswana	25–15	19–25	25–19	25–16		94–75
3 Sep	Algeria	3–1	Cameroon	24–26	25–11	25–21	25–22		99–80
4 Sep	Algeria	3–0	Senegal	25–14	25–12	25–19			75–45

=== Semifinals ===
Date		Score		Set 1	Set 2	Set 3	Set 4	Set 5	Total
6 Sep	Algeria	3–0	Nigeria	25–16	25–17	25–19			75–52

=== Final ===
Date		Score		Set 1	Set 2	Set 3	Set 4	Set 5	Total
7 Sep	Algeria	3–1	Cameroon	25–14	25–23	18–25	25–14		93–76
