= Tunisia at the 2015 African Games =

Tunisia at the 2015 All-Africa Games
- IOC code: TUN
- NOC: Tunisian Olympic Committee

in Brazzaville
- Competitors: 111 in 15 sports
- Flag bearer: Ines Boubakri
- Medals Ranked 5th: Gold 30 Silver 26 Bronze 38 Total 94

All-Africa Games appearances (overview)
- 1965; 1973; 1978; 1987; 1991; 1995; 1999; 2003; 2007; 2011; 2015; 2019; 2023

Youth appearances
- 2010

Tunisia participated at the 2015 African Games held in the city of Brazzaville, Republic of the Congo. It participated with 111 athletes in 14 sports, not counting the Paralympics games.

== Medal summary ==
=== Medal table ===
Sport	Gold	Silver	Bronze	Total
Beach volleyball				
Cycling				
Karate			3	3
Judo	2	6	5	13
Table tennis				
Gymnastics			2	2
Weightlifting	8	5	5	18
Taekwondo				
Fencing	4	4	2	10
Boxing	1	1	1	3
Swimming		2	10	12
Athletics	1	1	2	4
Wrestling				
Tennis				
Total	30	26	38	94

Disabled Sports
Sport	Gold	Silver	Bronze	Total
Disabled sports	4	1	3	8
Total	4	1	3	8

== Karate ==
=== Women ===
Event	Gold	Silver	Bronze
Women's Kumite −61 KG (September 8)	Giana Lotfy (EGY)	Saïda Djedra (ALG)	Rosine Joelle Tchuako (CMR); Boutheina Hasnaoui (TUN)
Women's Kumite +68 KG (September 8)	Mame Fatou Thiaw (SEN)	Imene Atif (ALG)	Nina Youlou (CGO); Aissa Faten (TUN)

== Judo ==
=== Men ===
Event	Gold	Silver	Bronze
−60 kg (September 13)	Ahmed Abelrahman (EGY)	Kamel Haroune (ALG)	Fraj Dhouibi (TUN); Nayr Garcia Pedro (ANG)
−81 kg (September 14)	Mohamed Abdelaal (EGY)	Kibikai Paul (GAB)	Abdelaziz Ben Ammar (TUN); Ali Hazem (EGY)
−100 kg (September 14)	Lyes Bouyacoub (ALG)	Anis Ben Khaled (TUN)	Baboukar Mane (SEN); Seidou Nji Mouluh (CMR)

=== Women ===
Event	Gold	Silver	Bronze
−48 kg (September 13)	Sabrina Saidi (ALG)	Olfa Saoudi (TUN)	Taciana Lima (GNB); Fatima Bashir (NGR)
−52 kg (September 13)	Djazia Haddad (ALG)	Hela Ayari (TUN)	Franca Audu (NGR); Salimata Fofana (CIV)
−63 kg (September 13)	Hélène Wezeu Dombeu (CMR)	Souad Belakhal (ALG)	Szandra Szögedi (GHA); Meriem Bjaoui (TUN)
−78 kg (September 14)	Kaouthar Ouallal (ALG)	Sarra Mzougui (TUN)	Ebere Rita (NGA); Hortence Vane Mballa Atangana (CMR)
−70 kg (September 14)	Nihel Bouchoucha (TUN)	Houda Miled (TUN)	Aicha Ben Abderahmane (ALG); Antonia Moreira (ANG)

== Weightlifting ==
=== Men ===
Event	Gold	Silver	Bronze
77 kg (September 9)	Rami Bahloul (TUN)	Ibrahim Ramadhan (EGY)	Hani Maatoug Cheridi (LBY)

== Fencing ==
=== Men ===
Event	Gold	Silver	Bronze
Men's Individual Sabre (September 2)	Fares Ferjani (TUN)	Hichem Samandi (TUN)	Ziad Elsissy (EGY); Ahmed Ehab (EGY)
Men's Individual Foil (September 3)	Alaaeldin Abouelkassem (EGY)	Roman Djitli (ALG)	Mohamed Ayoub Ferjani (TUN); Mohamed Essam (EGY)
Men's Team Sabre (September 5)	Egypt; Ahmed Ahr; Ahmed Ehab; Ziad Elsissy; Mohab Samer	Tunisia; Fares Ferjani; Souhaieb Sakrani; Hichem Samandi	Senegal; Alassane Ba; Moustapha Diagne; Ibrahima Konte
Men's Team Foil (September 6)	Egypt; Alaaeldin Abouelkassem; Marwan Ahmed; Tarek Ayad; Mohamed Essam	Tunisia; Mohamed Ayoub Ferjani; Mohamed Aziz Metoui; Fares Zidi	Algeria; Roman Djilti; Salim Heroui; Yanis Baptiste Mabed; Youcef Madi

=== Women ===
Event	Gold	Silver	Bronze
Women's Individual Foil (September 2)	Ines Boubakri (TUN)	Haifa Jabri (TUN)	Anissa Khalfaoui (ALG); Hadil Elsharkawy (EGY)
Women's Individual Epee (September 3)	Sarra Besbes (TUN)	Ayah Mahdy (EGY)	Nardin Ehab (EGY); Nourhan Desouky (EGY)
Women's Team Foil (September 5)	Tunisia; Dorra Ben Jaballah; Sarra Besbes; Ines Boubakri; Haifa Jabri	Algeria; Narimene Elhaouari; Anissa Khelfaoui; Louiza Khelfaoui; Khadidja Zerabib	Egypt; Hadil Elsharkawy; Yara Elsharkawy; Noura Mohamed; Aida Yasser
Women's Team epee (September 5)	South Africa; Juliana Barrett; Tamryn Carfoot; Aphiwe Tuku; Giselle Vicatos	Egypt; Nourhan Desouky; Nardin Ehab; Shirwit Gaber; Ayah Mahdy	Tunisia; Dorra Ben Jaballah; Sarra Besbes; Nesrine Ghrib; Maya Mansouri

== Boxing ==
=== Men ===
Event	Gold	Silver	Bronze
Catégorie 56KG (September 13)	Billel M'hamdi (TUN)	Khalil Litim (ALG)	–

=== Women ===
Event	Gold	Silver	Bronze
Catégorie 51KG (September 13)	Souhila Bouchene (ALG)	Caroline Linus (NGA)	Rym Jouini (TUN); Ziqubu Bathabile (RSA)
Catégorie 51KG (September 13)	Obareh Kehinde (NGA)	Khouloud Hlimi (TUN)	Ilham Mekhaled (ALG); Ayat El Said Mohamed (EGY)

== Swimming ==
=== Men ===
Event	Gold	Silver	Bronze
100m Breaststroke – Final (September 6)	Cameron Van Der Burgh (RSA)	Yossif Elkamash (EGY)	Wassim Elloumi (TUN)
200m Freestyle – Final (September 6)	Devon Brown (RSA)	Marwan Elkamash (EGY)	Ahmed Mathlouthi (TUN)
50m Breaststroke – Final (September 7)	Cameron Van Der Burgh (RSA)	Yossif Elkamash (EGY)	Wassim Elloumi (TUN)
4x200m Freestyle Relay – Final (September 8)	South Africa	Egypt	Tunisia
400m Freestyle – Final (September 9)	Ahmed Akram (EGY)	Devon Brown (ZAF)	Ahmed Mathlouthi (TUN)
200m Breaststroke – Final (September 9)	Ayrton Sweeney (ZAF)	Wassim Elloumi (TUN)	Yossif Elkamash (EGY)
1 500m Freestyle – Final (September 9)	Ahmed Akram (EGY)	Ahmed Mathlouthi (TUN)	Brent Szurdoki (RSA)

=== Women ===
Event	Gold	Silver	Bronze
4x100m Freestyle Relay – Final (September 8)	South Africa	Egypt	Tunisia

== Athletics ==
=== Men ===
Event	Gold	Silver	Bronze
400 m hurdles (September 16)	Abdelmalik Lahoulou (ALG)	Miloud Rahmani (ALG)	Mohamed Sghaier (TUN)
Pole vault (September 16)	Hichem Khalil Cherabi (ALG)	Jordan Yamoah (GHA)	Mohamed Romdhana (TUN)

=== Women ===
Event	Gold	Silver	Bronze
Pole vault (September 14)	Syrine Balti (TUN)	Dorra Mahfoudhi (TUN)	Sinaly Ouattara (CIV)

== Disabled sports ==
=== Men ===
Event	Gold	Silver	Bronze
100m (T54) – Final (September 14)	Fathi Zouinkhi (TUN)	Botsyo Nkegbe (GHA)	Maamar Harachif (ALG)
800 m (T54) (September 15)	Yassine Gharbi (TUN)	Patrick Yaw Obeng (GHA)	Fathi Zouinkhi (TUN)
1500 m (T53-54) (September 16)	Yassine Gharbi (TUN)	Patrick Yaw Obeng (GHA)	Fathi Zouinkhi (TUN)

=== Women ===
Event	Gold	Silver	Bronze
200m (T12) (September 15)	Edmilsa Luciano Governo (MOZ)	Maria Muchavo (MOZ)	Najah Chouaya (TUN)
100m (T37) (September 17)	Johanna Benson (NAM)	Neda Bahi (TUN)	–
Javelin throw (F53-56) (September 17)	Hania Aidi (TUN)	Flora Ugwunwa (NGA)	Mariam Coulibaly (MLI)
