= Tunisia at the 1987 All-Africa Games =

- IOC code: TUN
- NOC: Tunisian Olympic Committee

in Nairobi
- Medals Ranked 2nd: Gold 28 Silver 26 Bronze 22 Total 76

All-Africa Games appearances (overview)
- 1965; 1973; 1978; 1987; 1991; 1995; 1999; 2003; 2007; 2011; 2015; 2019; 2023

Youth appearances
- 2010

Tunisia participated in the 4th All-Africa games held in Nairobi, Kenya in August 1987. Although originally scheduled for 1982 a weak Kenyan economy hindered preparations. It was proposed for a time that Tunis, Tunisia would host the 4th games letting Kenya host the 5th in order to speed up the process, but this proposal was ultimately voted down. Tunisia would go on to win 76 medals and 28 golds going first in the overall medal count and second only to Egypt in total gold medals.

== Medal summary ==
Tunisia won 28 golds, 26 silvers, 22 bronzes, and 76 total medals.

== See also ==
- Tunisia at the All-Africa Games
