= Volleyball at the 2011 All-Africa Games – Women's tournament =

The Women's tournament of the volleyball competition of the 2011 All-Africa Games was held from September 6–16, 2011 in Maputo.

== Teams ==
- Algeria
- Botswana
- Cameroon
- Kenya
- Mozambique
- Nigeria
- Senegal
- Seychelles

== Preliminary round ==
=== Group A ===
Pos	Team	Pld	W	L	Pts	SW	SL	SR	SPW	SPL	SPR	Qualification
1	Kenya	3	3	0	9	9	0	MAX	225	144	1.563	Semifinals
2	Nigeria	3	2	1	6	6	3	2.000	197	193	1.021	Semifinals
3	Mozambique	3	1	2	2	3	8	0.375	196	255	0.769	5th–8th place
4	Seychelles	3	0	3	1	2	9	0.222	228	254	0.898	5th–8th place

Date		Score		Set 1	Set 2	Set 3	Set 4	Set 5	Total
2 Sep	Kenya	3–0	Seychelles	25–22	19–13	25–23			75–58
2 Sep	Nigeria	3–0	Mozambique	25–20	25–16	25–17			75–53
3 Sep	Kenya	3–0	Mozambique	25–15	25–11	25–13			75–39
3 Sep	Nigeria	3–0	Seychelles	25–23	25–21	25–21			75–65
4 Sep	Kenya	3–0	Nigeria	25–13	25–13	25–21			75–47
4 Sep	Mozambique	3–2	Seychelles	20–25	25–19	16–25	25–20	18–20	104–105

=== Group B ===
Pos	Team	Pld	W	L	Pts	SW	SL	SR	SPW	SPL	SPR	Qualification
1	Algeria	3	3	0	9	9	2	4.500	268	200	1.340	Semifinals
2	Cameroon	3	2	1	6	7	5	1.400	269	259	1.039	Semifinals
3	Senegal	3	1	2	3	4	7	0.571	225	245	0.918	5th–8th place
4	Botswana	3	0	3	0	3	9	0.333	226	284	0.796	5th–8th place

Date		Score		Set 1	Set 2	Set 3	Set 4	Set 5	Total
2 Sep	Algeria	3–1	Botswana	25–15	19–25	25–19	25–16		94–75
2 Sep	Cameroon	3–1	Senegal	25–14	19–25	25–23	25–23		94–85
3 Sep	Senegal	3–1	Botswana	25–14	20–25	25–17	25–20		95–76
3 Sep	Algeria	3–1	Cameroon	24–26	25–11	25–21	25–22		99–80
4 Sep	Algeria	3–0	Senegal	25–14	25–12	25–19			75–45
4 Sep	Cameroon	3–1	Botswana	25–21	25–16	20–25	25–13		95–75

== Knockout stage ==
=== Championship bracket ===
Semi-finals
Kenya	1
Cameroon	3
Nigeria	0
Algeria	3

Final
Cameroon	1
Algeria	3
Third place
Kenya	3
Nigeria	0

=== Semifinals ===
Date		Score		Set 1	Set 2	Set 3	Set 4	Set 5	Total
6 Sep	Cameroon	3–1	Kenya	24–26	25–22	31–29	25–20		105–97
6 Sep	Algeria	3–0	Nigeria	25–16	25–17	25–19			75–52

=== Third place game ===
Date		Score		Set 1	Set 2	Set 3	Set 4	Set 5	Total
7 Sep	Kenya	3–0	Nigeria	25–14	25–15	25–16			75–45

=== Final ===
Date		Score		Set 1	Set 2	Set 3	Set 4	Set 5	Total
7 Sep	Algeria	3–1	Cameroon	25–14	25–23	18–25	25–14		93–76

=== 5–8th place bracket ===
Semifinals
Mozambique	0
Botswana	3
Seychelles	2
Senegal	3

Fifth place game
Botswana	0
Senegal	3
Seventh place game
Mozambique	0
Seychelles	3

=== Semifinals ===
Date		Score		Set 1	Set 2	Set 3	Set 4	Set 5	Total
6 Sep	Botswana	3–0	Mozambique	25–13	25–20	25–15			75–48
6 Sep	Senegal	3–2	Seychelles	32–34	25–19	25–17	20–25	15–8	117–103

=== Seventh place game ===
Date		Score		Set 1	Set 2	Set 3	Set 4	Set 5	Total
7 Sep	Seychelles	3–0	Mozambique	25–18	25–7	25–21			75–47

=== Fifth place game ===
Date		Score		Set 1	Set 2	Set 3	Set 4	Set 5	Total
7 Sep	Senegal	3–0	Botswana	25–15	27–25	25–14			77–54

== See also ==
- Volleyball at the 2011 All-Africa Games – Men's tournament
