= Tunisia at the 2019 African Games =

- Flag of Tunisia
- IOC code: TUN
- NOC: Tunisian Olympic Committee

in Rabat, Morocco 19 August 2019 – 31 August 2019
- Competitors: 179 (97 men and 82 women) in 26 sports
- Medals Ranked 6th: Gold 26 Silver 36 Bronze 35 Total 97

African Games appearances (overview)
- 1965; 1973; 1978; 1987; 1991; 1995; 1999; 2003; 2007; 2011; 2015; 2019; 2023

Tunisia competed at the 2019 African Games held from 19 to 31 August 2019 in Rabat, Morocco. In total, athletes representing Tunisia competed in all 26 sports held at the competition and they won 26 gold medals, 36 silver medals and 35 bronze medals. The country finished in 6th place in the medal table.

== Medal summary ==
=== Medal table ===
Medal	Name	Sport	Event	Date
Gold	Ghofran Khelifi	Judo	Women's -57 kg	17 August
Gold	Nihel Cheikh Rouhou	Judo	Women's +78 kg	18 August
Gold	Mohamed Taieb	Rowing	Men's single sculls 1000 metres	21 August
Gold	Mohamed Taieb	Rowing	Men's single sculls 500 metres	22 August
Gold	Mohamed Khalil Mansouri	Rowing	Men's lightweight single sculls 500 metres	22 August
Gold	Syrine Fattoum; Ons Lajili; Mohamed Aziz Sebai; Seifeddine Selmi	Triathlon	Mixed relay	25 August
Gold	Dorra Mahfoudhi	Athletics	Women's pole vault	27 August
Gold	Abdessalem Ayouni	Athletics	Men's 800 metres	28 August
Gold	Khouloud Hlimi Ep Moulahi	Boxing	Women's lightweight (60kg)	29 August
Gold	Aziz Dougaz; Skander Mansouri	Tennis	Men's doubles	29 August
Gold	Ayoub Barraj	Wrestling	Men's freestyle 86 kg	30 August
Silver	Fraj Dhouibi	Judo	Men's -60 kg	17 August
Silver	Oussama Mohamed Snoussi	Judo	Men's -90 kg	18 August
Silver	Nihel Landolsi	Judo	Women's -70 kg	18 August
Silver	Khadija Krimi	Rowing	Women's lightweight single sculls 1000 metres	21 August
Silver	Khadija Krimi	Rowing	Women's lightweight single sculls 500 metres	22 August
Silver	Khadija Krimi; Mohamed Taieb	Rowing	Mixed 2 x 500 metres single sculls	23 August
Silver	Mejdi Chehata	Athletics	Men's pole vault	29 August
Silver	Mohamed Hammed	Archery	Men's individual recurve	30 August
Silver	Tunisia	Archery	Men's team recurve	30 August
Silver	Rihab El Walid	Archery	Women's individual recurve	30 August
Bronze	Meriem Bjaoui	Judo	Women's -63 kg	17 August
Bronze	Faïcel Jaballah	Judo	Men's +100 kg	18 August
Bronze	Sarra Mzougui	Judo	Women's -78 kg	18 August
Bronze	Mohamed Khalil Mansouri	Rowing	Men's lightweight single sculls 1000 metres	21 August
Bronze	Nour El-Houda Ettaieb	Rowing	Women's single sculls 1000 metres	21 August
Bronze	Maher Habouria	Cycling	Men's Cross-country	21 August
Bronze	Men's team	Table tennis	Men's team	23 August
Bronze	Women's team	Table tennis	Women's team	23 August
Bronze	Aziz Dougaz	Tennis	Men's singles	28 August
Bronze	Mohamed Amine Touati	Athletics	Men's 400 metres hurdles	29 August
Bronze	Nada Charoudi	Athletics	Women's heptathlon	29 August
Bronze	Aziz Dougaz; Skander Mansouri	Tennis	Men's team event	31 August

Medals by sport
Sport	1st place, gold medalist(s)	2nd place, silver medalist(s)	3rd place, bronze medalist(s)	Total
Archery	0	3	0	3
Athletics	2	1	2	5
Boxing	1	0	0	1
Canoeing	3	6	6	15
Cycling	0	0	1	1
Fencing	3	5	2	10
Gymnastics	0	0	2	2
Judo	2	3	3	8
Karate	2	1	1	4
Rowing	3	3	2	8
Swimming	1	3	2	6
Table tennis	0	0	3	3
Taekwondo	2	2	2	6
Tennis	1	0	2	3
Triathlon	1	0	0	1
Weightlifting	4	5	3	12
Wrestling	1	4	4	9
Total	26	36	35	97

Medals by date
Day	Date	1st place, gold medalist(s)	2nd place, silver medalist(s)	3rd place, bronze medalist(s)	Total
1	16 August	0	0	0	0
2	17 August	1	1	1	3
3	18 August	1	2	2	5
4	19 August	0	0	0	0
5	20 August	0	0	0	0
6	21 August	1	1	3	5
7	22 August	2	1	0	3
8	23 August	0	1	2	3
Total		5	6	8	19

== Archery ==
Tunisia competed in archery.

Mohamed Hammed won the silver medal in the men's individual event.

Sabeur Ben Brahim, Nabil Benromdhan and Mohamed Hammed won the silver medal in the men's team event.

Rihab El Walid won the silver medal in the women's individual event.

== Athletics ==
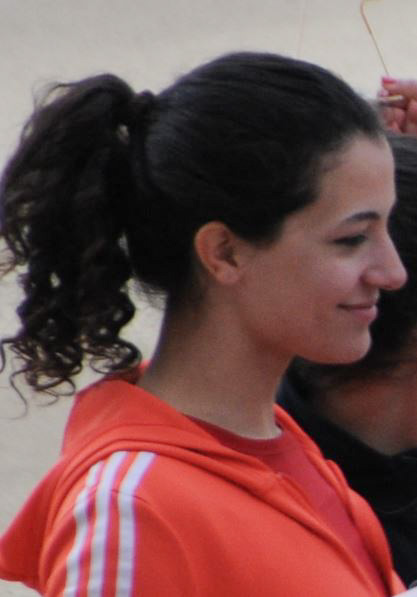
Dorra Mahfoudhi (2015)

Abdessalem Ayouni won the gold medal in the men's 800 metres event. This was Ayouni's first medal at the African Games. He previously competed in the 2015 African Games in the men's 1500 metres event where he finished in 6th place.

Dorra Mahfoudhi won the gold medal in the women's pole vault event. Her result of 4.31m was also a new African Games record.

Mejdi Chehata won the silver medal in the men's pole vault event.

Mohamed Amine Touati won the bronze medal in the men's 400 metres hurdles event.

Nada Charoudi won the bronze medal in the women's heptathlon event.

== Boxing ==
Khouloud Hlimi Ep Moulahi won the gold medal in the women's lightweight (60kg) event.

== Canoeing ==
Athletes representing Tunisia competed in canoeing and won three gold medals, six silver medals and six bronze medals.

Mohamed Mrabet won the gold medal in the men's K-1 1000 metres event and the silver medal in the men's K-1 200 metres event.

Mohamed Mrabet and Outail Khatali won the silver medal in the men's K-2 1000 metres event and the bronze medal in the men's K-2 200 metres event.

Ghailene Khattali won the gold medals in both the men's C-1 200 metres and men's C-1 1000 metres events.

Ghailene Khattali and Mohamed Kendaoui won the bronze medals in both the men's C-2 200 metres and men's C-2 1000 metres events.

Khaoula Sassi won the silver medals in the women's K-1 200 metres and K-1 500 metres events.

Nedra Trabelsi won the silver medal in the women's C-1 500 metres event and the bronze medal in the women's C-1 200 metres event.

Ghada Belhaj and Nedra Trabelsi won the bronze medals in the women's C-2 200 metres and women's C-2 500 metres events.

== Cycling ==
Athletes representing Tunisia competed in cycling.

Maher Habouria won the bronze medal in the men's cross-country mountain bike event.

== Equestrian ==
Four equestrians represented Tunisia. They competed in the individual jumping event as well as the team jumping event and did not win any medals.

== Fencing ==
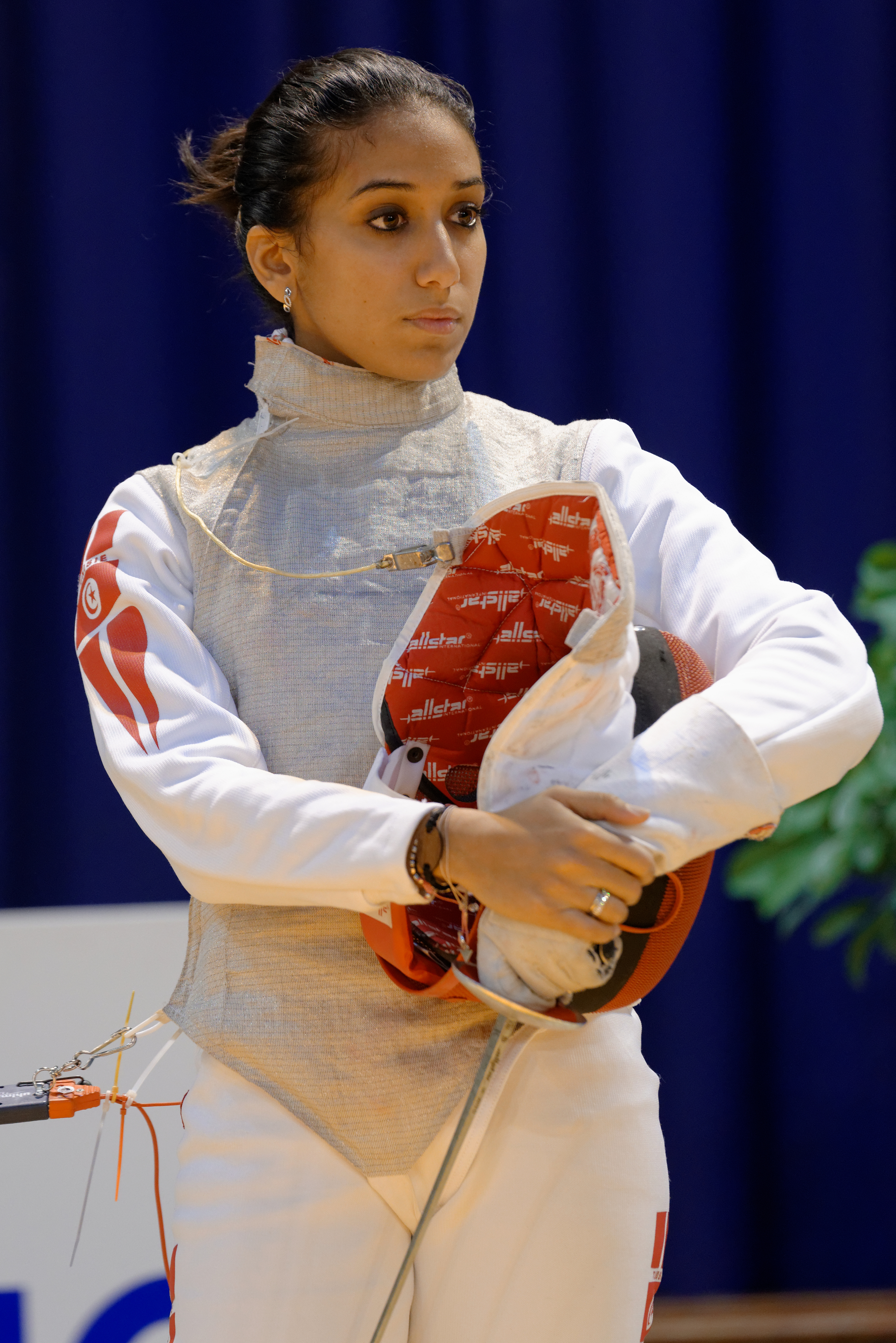
Inès Boubakri (2014)

Athletes representing Tunisia competed in fencing and won three gold medals, five silver medals and two bronze medals.

Mohamed Ayoub Ferjani won the silver medal in the men's individual foil event.

Mohamed Samandi won a bronze medal in the men's individual foil event.

Farès Ferjani won the gold medal in the men's individual sabre event.

Ahmed Ferjani won a bronze medal in the men's individual sabre event.

Inès Boubakri won the gold medal in the women's individual foil event.

Sarra Besbes won the gold medal in the women's individual épée event.

== Gymnastics ==
Four athletes represented Tunisia in gymnastics. In total, two bronze medals were won.

Wissem Harzi won the bronze medal in the men's pommel horse event.

Chahed Sakr won the bronze medal in the women's vault event.

== Handball ==
Tunisia's women's national handball team competed in handball. They were eliminated in the quarter-finals by the women's team of the Democratic Republic of the Congo.

== Judo ==
Eleven athletes represented Tunisia in judo: Oumaima Bedioui, Abdelaziz Ben Ammar, Meriem Bjaoui, Nihel Cheikh Rouhou, Fraj Dhouibi, Faïcel Jaballah, Ghofran Khelifi, Nihel Landolsi, Monaam Mejri, Sarra Mzougui and Oussama Mohamed Snoussi.

== Karate ==
Athletes representing Tunisia competed in karate and they won two gold medals, one silver medal and one bronze medal.

Thamer Slimani won the gold medal in the men's Kumite -84kg event.

Nader Azzouzi won a bronze medal in the men's Kumite -60kg event.

Bouthaina Hasnaoui Ep Lomonaco won the silver medal in the women's Kumite -61kg event.

Chehinez Jemi won the gold medal in the women's Kumite +68kg event.

== Rowing ==
Four athletes competed in rowing: Nour El-Houda Ettaieb, Khadija Krimi, Mohamed Khalil Mansouri and Mohamed Taieb and in total they won three gold medals, three silver medals and two bronze medals.

Ettaieb won the bronze medal in the women's single sculls 1000 metres event.

Krimi won the silver medals in the women's lightweight single sculls 500 metres and women's lightweight single sculls 1000 metres events.

Krimi and Taieb also won the silver medal in the relay 2 × 500 metres single sculls event.

Mansouri won the gold medal in the men's lightweight single sculls 500 metres event and the bronze medal in the men's lightweight single sculls 1000 metres event.

Taieb won the gold medals in the men's single sculls 500 metres and men's single sculls 1000 metres events.

== Swimming ==
Three swimmers represented Tunisia, Mohamed Mehdi Agili, Adnan Beji and Wassim Elloumi, and all three won at least one medal.

Mohamed Mehdi Agili won one gold medal (in the men's 400 metre freestyle event) and three silver medals (in the men's 200 metre freestyle, men's 800 metre freestyle and men's 1500 metre freestyle events).

Wassim Elloumi won the bronze medal in the men's 50 metre breaststroke event and Adnan Beji won the bronze medal in the men's 200 metre breaststroke event.

In total they won one gold medal, three silver medals and two bronze medals and Tunisia finished in 5th place in the medal table.

== Table tennis ==
Tunisia competed in table tennis and both the men's team and women's team won bronze medals in the men's team and women's team events respectively.

Adam Hmam and Thameur Mamia won a bronze medal in the men's doubles event.

== Taekwondo ==
Athletes representing Tunisia competed in Taekwondo and they won two gold medals, two silver medals and two bronze medals.

== Tennis ==
In total, tennis players representing Tunisia won one gold medal and two bronze medals.

Aziz Dougaz won a bronze medal in the men's singles event.

Dougaz and Skander Mansouri also won the gold medal in the men's doubles event.

In the men's team event they won the bronze medal.

== Triathlon ==
Syrine Fattoum, Ons Lajili, Mohamed Aziz Sebai and Seifeddine Selmi competed in triathlon. They won the gold medal in the mixed relay event.

== Weightlifting ==
Tunisia competed in weightlifting. In total, weightlifters representing Tunisia won four gold medals, five silver medals and three bronze medals and the country finished in 4th place in the weightlifting medal table.

Karem Ben Hnia won all three gold medals in the Men's 73 kg event. He also set a new African Games record of 153 kg in the Men's 73 kg Snatch event.

Amine Bouhijbha won the silver medal in the Men's 61 kg Snatch event.

Ramzi Bahloul won the silver medal in the Men's 81 kg Snatch event.

Aymen Bacha won the gold medal in the Men's 109 kg Snatch event, the silver medal in the Clean & Jerk and the silver medal in Total.

Zohra Chihi won the silver medal in the Women's 49 kg Snatch event.

Chaima Rahmouni won all three bronze medals in the Women's 59 kg event.

== Wrestling ==
Marwa Amri was scheduled to compete in wrestling but ultimately did not compete. In total wrestlers representing Tunisia won one gold medal, four silver medals and four bronze medals.

Ayoub Barraj won the gold medal in the men's freestyle 86 kg event.
