= Mohamed Mamoun =

Egyptian tennis player

- Country (sports): Egypt
- Born: 15 October 1981 (age 43); Cairo, Egypt
- Plays: Right-handed
- Prize money: $47,866

Singles
- Career record: 13–9 (Davis Cup)
- Highest ranking: No. 272 (13 Aug 2007)

Doubles
- Career record: 7–9 (Davis Cup)
- Highest ranking: No. 457 (2 Oct 2006)
Medal record
All-Africa Games
Silver medal – second place	2007 Algiers	Singles
Silver medal – second place	2007 Algiers	Doubles
Bronze medal – third place	2003 Abuja	Doubles

Mohamed Mamoun (born 15 October 1981) is an Egyptian former professional tennis player.

Born in Cairo, Mamoun was attached to the city's Heliopolis Club and made his debut for the Egypt Davis Cup team in 2001. He had a best singles world ranking of 272, with two ITF Futures title wins. In 2007 he was a semi-finalist at the Samarkand Challenger and finished runner-up to Lamine Ouahab at the All-Africa Games in Algiers. He made his final Davis Cup appearance for Egypt in 2009 and later served as team captain.

== ITF Futures finals ==
=== Singles: 7 (2–5) ===
Result	W–L	Date	Tournament	Surface	Opponent	Score
Loss	0–1	Sep 2003	Kenya F1, Mombasa	Hard	(South Africa) Wesley Whitehouse	5–7, 6–2, 6–7^{(6)}
Loss	0–2	May 2006	Kuwait F1, Mishref	Hard	(Switzerland) Marco Chiudinelli	0–6, 2–6
Loss	0–3	Jun 2006	Tunisia F3A, Carthage	Clay	(Morocco) Rabie Chaki	1–6, 2–6
Win	1–3	Nov 2006	Tunisia F4, Sfax	Hard	(Greece) Alexandros Jakupovic	1–6, 7–6^{(5)}, 7–5
Loss	1–4	Apr 2007	Egypt F2, Cairo	Clay	(France) Laurent Recouderc	4–6, 3–6
Loss	1–5	Sep 2007	Egypt F7, Cairo	Clay	(Egypt) Sherif Sabry	0–6, 6–4, 2–6
Win	2–5	Sep 2007	Egypt F8, Heliopolis	Clay	(Egypt) Karim Maamoun	6–3, 6–2

=== Doubles: 15 (8–7) ===
Result	W–L	Date	Tournament	Surface	Partner	Opponents	Score
Loss	0–1	Jun 2002	Morocco F3, Agadir	Clay	(Egypt) Karim Maamoun	(Japan) Jun Kato (Luxembourg) Mike Scheidweiler	0–6, 2–6
Win	1–1	Jul 2002	Egypt F1, Dokki	Clay	(Egypt) Karim Maamoun	(Czech Republic) Dušan Karol (Germany) Benedikt Stronk	6–3, 3–6, 6–3
Win	2–1	Jul 2002	Serbia & Montenegro F5, Belgrade	Clay	(France) Stéphane Robert	(Federal Republic of Yugoslavia) Nikola Ćirić (Federal Republic of Yugoslavia) Goran Tošić	7–5, 6–2
Loss	2–2	Mar 2003	France F8, Melun	Carpet	(Egypt) Karim Maamoun	(Switzerland) Michael Lammer (Switzerland) Roman Valent	w/o
Win	3–2	Aug 2003	Egypt F1, Cairo	Clay	(Egypt) Karim Maamoun	(Morocco) Jalal Chafai (Morocco) Talal Ouahabi	6–4, 6–3
Loss	3–3	Jan 2004	Qatar F1A, Doha	Hard	(Egypt) Karim Maamoun	(Germany) Philipp Petzschner (Germany) Lars Uebel	6–4, 3–6, 4–6
Loss	3–4	Aug 2004	Romania F13, Arad	Clay	(Egypt) Karim Maamoun	(Romania) Cătălin-Ionuț Gârd (Romania) Andrei Mlendea	6–3, 4–6, 6–7^{(4)}
Win	4–4	Sep 2007	Egypt F6, Heliopolis	Clay	(Egypt) Karim Maamoun	(Egypt) Mahmoud Ezz (Egypt) Sherif Sabry	6–3, 6–4
Win	5–4	Sep 2007	Egypt F7, Cairo	Clay	(Egypt) Sherif Sabry	(Morocco) Reda El Amrani (Morocco) Younès Rachidi	7–6^{(0)}, 6–2
Win	6–4	Sep 2007	Egypt F8, Heliopolis	Clay	(Egypt) Karim Maamoun	(Morocco) Reda El Amrani (Morocco) Younès Rachidi	6–4, 6–3
Win	7–4	Jun 2008	Iran F1, Tehran	Clay	(Kazakhstan) Alexey Kedryuk	(Turkey) Haluk Akkoyun (Turkey) Ergün Zorlu	6–4, 7–6^{(2)}
Win	8–4	Jun 2008	Iran F2, Tehran	Clay	(Kazakhstan) Alexey Kedryuk	(India) Rohan Gajjar (Uzbekistan) Murad Inoyatov	6–0, 7–6^{(3)}
Loss	8–5	Mar 2009	Egypt F4, 6th of October	Clay	(North Macedonia) Predrag Rusevski	(Morocco) Mounir El Aarej (Morocco) Talal Ouahabi	4–6, 6–4, [11–13]
Loss	8–6	Apr 2009	Egypt F6, Cairo	Clay	(North Macedonia) Predrag Rusevski	(Romania) Teodor-Dacian Crăciun (Egypt) Karim Maamoun	w/o
Loss	8–7	Jun 2009	Egypt F9, Giza	Clay	(Morocco) Talal Ouahabi	(Egypt) Karim Maamoun (Egypt) Sherif Sabry	6–3, 1–6, [3–10]
