= Victoria Agbodobiri =

Nigerian judoka

Personal information
- Full name: Victoria Agbodobiri
- Nationality: Nigeria
- Born: Nigeria

Sport
- Sport: Judo
- Event: 52 kg
Medal record
Women's judo
Representing Nigeria
All-Africa Games
Bronze medal – third place	2011 Maputo	52kg

Victoria Agbodobiri (from Edo state) is a Nigerian judoka who competes in the women's category. She won a bronze medal at the 2011 All-Africa Games, in the category U52kg.

== Sports career ==
Victoria participated in the 2011 All-Africa Games held in Maputo, Mozambique. At the event, she won a bronze medal, in the women's 52kg event.
