= Takanyi Garanganga =

Zimbabwean tennis player

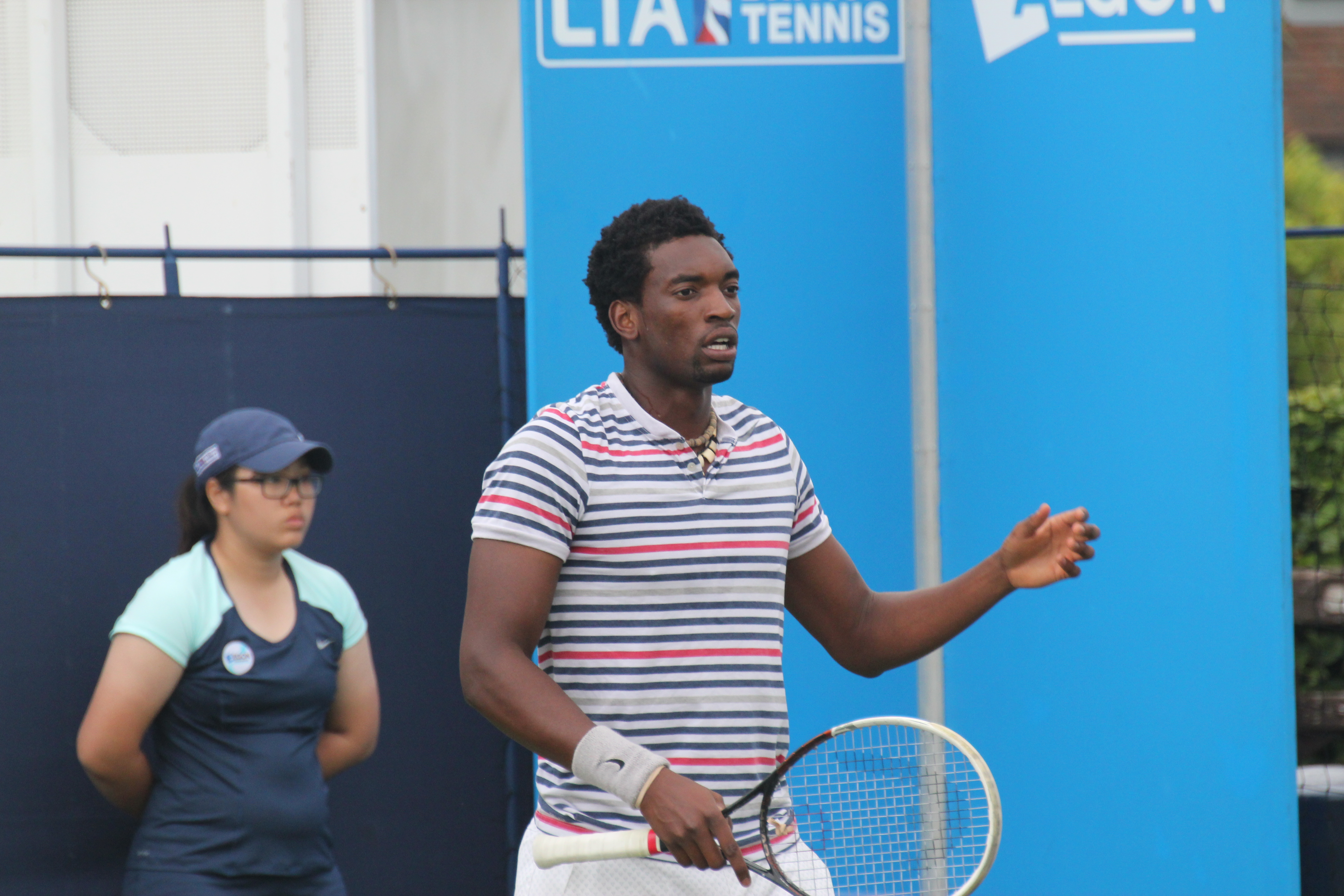
- Country (sports): Zimbabwe
- Residence: Atlanta, Georgia, United States
- Born: 6 September 1990 (age 35) Harare, Zimbabwe
- Height: 1.85 m (6 ft 1 in)
- Turned pro: 2009
- Plays: Right-handed (two-handed backhand)
- Prize money: $130,269

Singles
- Career record: 4–7
- Career titles: 0
- Highest ranking: No. 288 (22 September 2014)

Grand Slam singles results
- French Open Junior: 2R (2008)
- Wimbledon Junior: 1R (2008)
- US Open Junior: 1R (2007, 2008)

Doubles
- Career record: 1–1
- Career titles: 0
- Highest ranking: No. 771 (7 February 2011)

Grand Slam doubles results
- French Open Junior: 1R (2008)
- Wimbledon Junior: 1R (2008)
- US Open Junior: 2R (2008)

Team competitions
- Davis Cup: 21–21
Medal record
Representing Zimbabwe
Men's Tennis
All-Africa Games
Gold medal – first place	2011 Maputo	Singles
Bronze medal – third place	2011 Maputo	Doubles
- Last updated on: 31 December 2022.

Takanyi Garanganga (born 6 September 1990) is a professional Zimbabwean tennis player. He was born in Mbare, Zimbabwe, a suburb of Harare, and began playing tennis at the age of 8.

He first found success at the age of 14 playing tennis, winning the African Junior Championship at the age of 14. This success sparked the interest of Zimbabwean coach Brian de Villiers, who brought Garanganga to the United States. After a career on the junior circuit and graduating from high school at Keystone National High School in 2008, Garanganga turned down offers to play collegiate tennis at the University of Georgia and the University of Illinois to focus on a professional career.

Garanganga has represented Zimbabwe at Davis Cup, where he has a win–loss record of 21–21.

== Career ==
Takanyi Garanganga has primarily spent his time on the Futures circuit, while also playing challengers some ATP World Tour qualifying tournaments. He began playing on the tour in 2008, competing in tournaments in the United States and Africa. He has also represented Zimbabwe in Davis Cup action.

His most notable tournament success was winning the gold medal at the 2011 All-Africa Games in Maputo, Mozambique for Men's Singles.

== Future and Challenger finals ==
=== Singles: 20 (9–11) ===
Legend (singles) ATP Challenger Tour (0–0) ITF Futures Tour (9–11)	Titles by surface Hard (9–9) Clay (0–2) Grass (0–0) Carpet (0–0)

Result	W–L	Date	Tournament	Tier	Surface	Opponent	Score
Loss	0–1	Sep 2010	Uganda F1, Kampala	Futures	Clay	(Austria) Gerald Melzer	4–6, 4–6
Loss	0–2	Jul 2011	United States F18, Rochester	Futures	Clay	(Romania) Gabriel Moraru	4–6, 2–6
Win	1–2	Sep 2012	Turkey F35, Antalya	Futures	Hard	(Austria) Nikolaus Moser	3–0 RET
Win	2–2	Sep 2012	Turkey F36, Antalya	Futures	Hard	(Russia) Andrei Plotniy	3–6, 6–2, 6–2
Win	3–2	Dec 2012	Zimbabwe F1, Harare	Futures	Hard	(South Africa) Keith-Patrick Crowley	6–3, 7–6^{(10–8)}
Win	4–2	Jun 2013	Turkey F24, Istanbul	Futures	Hard	(South Africa) Nicolaas Scholtz	6–3, 7–5
Win	5–2	Sep 2013	Turkey F38, Antalya	Futures	Hard	(Czech Republic) Michal Konečný	6–4, 6–2
Loss	5–3	Dec 2014	Senegal F1, Dakar	Futures	Hard	(Belgium) Alexandre Folie	6–4, 5–7, 2–6
Win	6–3	Jan 2015	United States F4, Long Beach	Futures	Hard	(Denmark) Frederik Nielsen	6–7^{(5–7)}, 6–3, 6–4
Loss	6–4	Dec 2015	Nigeria F4, Lagos	Futures	Hard	(Netherlands) Antal van der Duim	3–6, 6–7^{(0–7)}
Loss	6–5	Oct 2016	United States F30, Fountain Valley	Futures	Hard	(Germany) Sebastian Fanselow	1–6, 6–7^{(9–11)}
Win	7–5	Dec 2016	Turkey F50, Antalya	Futures	Hard	(France) Gleb Sakharov	6–4, 6–4
Loss	7–6	Dec 2016	Turkey F51, Antalya	Futures	Hard	(France) Gleb Sakharov	3–6, 6–7^{(4–7)}
Loss	7–7	Apr 2017	United States F12, Memphis	Futures	Hard	(United States) Jared Hiltzik	3–6, 3–6
Loss	7–8	Dec 2017	South Africa F2, Stellenbosch	Futures	Hard	(France) Lény Mitjana	2–6, 4–6
Loss	7–9	Jun 2018	Zimbabwe F1, Harare	Futures	Hard	(Zimbabwe) Benjamin Lock	6–7^{(7–9)}, 2–6
Win	8–9	Jun 2018	Zimbabwe F3, Harare	Futures	Hard	(Zimbabwe) Benjamin Lock	6–1, 6–4
Win	9–9	Jun 2019	M15 Zimbabwe, Harare	World Tennis Tour	Hard	(Canada) Martin Beran	6–3, 6–4
Loss	9–10	Jun 2019	M15 Zimbabwe, Harare	World Tennis Tour	Hard	(Zimbabwe) Benjamin Lock	4–6, 0–6
Loss	9–11	Nov 2019	M15 Mozambique, Maputo	World Tennis Tour	Hard	(Spain) David Pérez Sanz	5–7, 3–6

=== Doubles 3 (2–1) ===
Legend (doubles) ATP Challenger Tour (0–0) ITF Futures Tour (2–1)	Titles by surface Hard (2–0) Clay (0–1) Grass (0–0) Carpet (0–0)

Result	W–L	Date	Tournament	Tier	Surface	Partner	Opponents	Score
Loss	0–1	Sep 2010	Uganda F1, Kampala	Futures	Clay	(Uganda) Duncan Mugabe	(United Kingdom) James Feaver (South Africa) Ruan Roelofse	6–7^{(8–10)}, 2–6
Win	1–1	Jan 2011	Guatemala F1, Guatemala City	Futures	Hard	(United States) Blake Strode	(Bulgaria) Boris Nicola Bakalov (United States) Adam El Mihdawy	7–5, 7–5
Win	2–1	Dec 2014	Senegal F1, Dakar	Futures	Hard	(South Africa) Keith-Patrick Crowley	(France) Tom Jomby (France) Mick Lescure	6–3, 6–3
