= Joyce Joseph Malfil =

Nigerian taekwondo practitioner

Personal information
- Full name: Joyce Joseph Malfil
- Nationality: Nigeria
- Born: Unknown

Sport
- Sport: Taekwondo
- Event: 73 kg
Medal record
Women's Taekwondo
Representing Nigeria
All-African Games
Bronze medal – third place	2011 Maputo	+73 kg

Joyce Joseph Malfil is a Nigerian taekwondo practitioner who competes in the women's senior category. She won a bronze medal at the 2011 All-African Games in the +73 kg category.

== Sports career ==
Joyce participated in the 2011 All-African Games held in Maputo, Mozambique in the 73 kg, she won a bronze medal.
