= Sherif Sabry =

Egyptian tennis player

- Country (sports): Egypt
- Residence: Cairo, Egypt
- Born: 29 August 1986 (age 39) Giza, Egypt
- Plays: Right-handed (Double-handed backhand)
- Prize money: $110,387

Singles
- Career record: 4–14
- Career titles: 0
- Highest ranking: No. 351 (29 September 2014)

Doubles
- Career record: 3–12
- Career titles: 0
- Highest ranking: No. 410 (17 May 2010)
Medal record
Representing Egypt
Men's Tennis
All-Africa Games
Gold medal – first place	2011 Maputo	Team Event
Silver medal – second place	2011 Maputo	Singles
Bronze medal – third place	2011 Maputo	Doubles
- Last updated on: 9 March 2020.

Sherif Sabry (born 29 August 1986) is an Egyptian tennis player. Sabry has been a regular player on the Egypt Davis Cup team since 2006, he has an overall record of 27–23.

Sabry has a career high ATP singles ranking of 351 achieved on 29 September 2014. He also has a career high ATP doubles ranking of 410, achieved on 17 May 2010.

== Future and Challenger finals ==
=== Singles: 19 (6–13) ===
Legend (singles) ATP Challenger Tour (0–0) ITF Futures Tour (5–10) ITF Satellite Tour (1–3)	Titles by surface Hard (0–3) Clay (6–10) Grass (0–0) Carpet (0–0)

Result	W–L	Date	Tournament	Tier	Surface	Opponent	Score
Loss	0–1	Aug 2005	Egypt 1, Cairo	Satellite	Clay	(Czech Republic) Michal Navrátil	4–6, 6–4, 5–7
Win	1–1	Oct 2005	Egypt 2, Cairo	Satellite	Clay	(Serbia and Montenegro) Boris Čonkić	6–3, 6–2
Loss	1–2	Aug 2006	Egypt 1, Cairo	Satellite	Clay	(Egypt) Karim Maamoun	7–5, 4–6, 5–7
Loss	1–3	Oct 2006	Egypt 2, Cairo	Satellite	Clay	(Egypt) Karim Maamoun	4–6, 2–6
Loss	1–4	Sep 2007	Egypt F6, Cairo	Futures	Clay	(Spain) Christian Ramos-Abad	4–6, 6–4, 3–6
Win	2–4	Sep 2007	Egypt F7, Cairo	Futures	Clay	(Egypt) Mohamed Mamoun	6–0, 4–6, 6–2
Loss	2–5	Dec 2007	Sudan F1, Khartoum	Futures	Clay	(Netherlands) Matwé Middelkoop	3–6, 2–6
Loss	2–6	Sep 2008	Egypt F5, Cairo	Futures	Clay	(Morocco) Talal Ouahabi	6–4, 5–7, 5–7
Win	3–6	Jun 2009	Egypt F10, Giza	Futures	Clay	(Cyprus) Photos Kallias	3–6, 7–5, 7–6^{(7–0)}
Win	4–6	Aug 2009	Egypt F11, Cairo	Futures	Clay	(France) Florian Reynet	6–4, 6–2
Win	5–6	Aug 2009	Egypt F12, Cairo	Futures	Clay	(Egypt) Karim Maamoun	4–6, 6–1, 6–3
Loss	5–7	Jul 2012	Belgium F4, Middelkerke	Futures	Hard	(France) Élie Rousset	6–7^{(6–8)}, 6–1, 3–6
Loss	5–8	Oct 2012	Nigeria F1, Lagos	Futures	Hard	(Spain) Enrique López Pérez	5–7, 6–1, 4–6
Loss	5–9	Dec 2012	Rwanda F2, Kigali	Futures	Clay	(Austria) Gerald Melzer	4–6, 4–6
Loss	5–10	Dec 2012	Turkey F49, Antalya	Futures	Hard	(Spain) Guillermo Olaso	4–6, 4–6
Win	6–10	Oct 2013	Egypt F28, Sharm El Sheikh	Futures	Clay	(Finland) Micke Kontinen	1–6, 6–1, 6–4
Loss	6–11	Dec 2013	Egypt F36, Sharm El Sheikh	Futures	Clay	(Australia) Jason Kubler	5–7, 3–6
Loss	6–12	Mar 2014	Egypt F9, Sharm El Sheikh	Futures	Clay	(Egypt) Mohamed Safwat	3–6, 3–6
Loss	6–13	Aug 2016	Morocco F5, Tangier	Futures	Clay	(Morocco) Reda El Amrani	3–6, 2–6
