= Tunisia at the African Games =

- IOC code: TUN
- NOC: Tunisian Olympic Committee
- Medals: Gold 275 Silver 271 Bronze 319 Total 865

African Games appearances (overview)
- 1965; 1973; 1978; 1987; 1991; 1995; 1999; 2003; 2007; 2011; 2015; 2019; 2023; 2027

Youth appearances
- 2010

Tunisia (TUN) has competed at every edition of the African Games. Since its inauguration in 1965, Tunisian athletes have won a total of 869 medals.

In the 1978 All-Africa Games, Tunisia was the top country on the medal table with a total of 63 medals.

== Medal tables ==
=== Medals by Games ===
Host nation

Below is a table representing all Tunisian medals around the Games.

Games	Athletes	Gold	Silver	Bronze	Total	Rank
1965 Brazzaville	-	1	5	6	12	9
1973 Lagos	-	4	6	3	13	6
1978 Algiers	-	29	14	20	63	1
1987 Nairobi	-	28	26	22	76	2
1991 Cairo	-	6	4	10	20	6
1995 Harare	-	9	11	19	39	6
1999 Johannesburg	-	20	20	23	63	4
2003 Abuja	-	30	29	30	89	5
2007 Algiers	-	48	41	58	147	5
2011 Maputo	72	29	26	13	68	4
2015 Brazzaville	111	23	26	41	90	5
2019 Rabat	179	26	36	35	97	6
2023 Accra	136	22	27	39	88	5
Total		275	271	319	865	

== See also ==
- Tunisia at the Olympics
- Tunisia at the Paralympics
- Tunisia at the Mediterranean Games
- Sports in Tunisia
