= Divine Aide Omo =

Nigerian taekwondo practitioner

Personal information
- Full name: Divine Aide Omo
- Nationality: Nigeria
- Born: Nigeria

Sport
- Sport: Taekwondo
- Event: 53 kg
Medal record
Women's Taekwondo
Representing Nigeria
All-African Games
Bronze medal – third place	2011 Maputo	53 kg

Divine Aide Omo is a Nigerian taekwondo practitioner who competes in the women's senior category. She won a bronze medal at the 2011 All-African Games in the 53 kg category.

== Sports career ==
Divine Aide won a bronze medal in the 53 kg event at the 2011 All-Africa Games held in Maputo, Mozambique.
