= Hana Mareghni =

Tunisian judoka (born 1989)

Personal information
- Nationality: Tunisia
- Born: 4 May 1989 (age 37) Tunis, Tunisia
- Height: 173 cm (5 ft 8 in)
- Weight: 77 kg (170 lb)

Sport
- Sport: Judo
- Event: -78 kg
Medal record
Women's judo
Representing Tunisia
All-Africa Games
Gold medal – first place	2011 Maputo	-78 kg
- Updated on 27 March 2013

Hana Mareghni (sometimes spelled Marghani or Mergheni; born 4 May 1989 in Tunis) is a Tunisian judoka. She competed at the 2012 Summer Olympics in the -78 kg event and lost her match to Mayra Aguiar.

At the 2011 All-Africa Games, Hana won a gold medal.
