= Tunisia at the 2023 African Games =

- Flag of Tunisia
- IOC code: TUN
- NOC: Tunisian Olympic Committee

in Accra, Ghana 8 March 2024 – 23 March 2024
- Competitors: 106 in 13 sports
- Medals Ranked 5th: Gold 22 Silver 27 Bronze 39 Total 88

African Games appearances (overview)
- 1965; 1973; 1978; 1987; 1991; 1995; 1999; 2003; 2007; 2011; 2015; 2019; 2023

Tunisia competed at the 2023 African Games held from 8 to 23 March 2024 in Accra, Ghana. Tunisia competed in 13 sports.

== Medal table ==
Medal	Name	Sport	Event	Date
Gold	Houssem Eddine Choiya	Karate	Men's kumite +84 kg	7 March
Gold	Tasnim Ben Wada	Weightlifting	Women's 49 kg clean & jerk	10 March
Gold	Oumaima Bedioui	Judo	Women's −48 kg	12 March
Gold	Rahma Tibi	Judo	Women's −52 kg	12 March
Gold	Hamza Ben Amor	Weightlifting	Men's 81 kg total	12 March
Gold	Hamza Ben Amor	Weightlifting	Men's 81 kg clean & jerk	12 March
Gold	Aleddine Ben Chalbi	Judo	Men's −73 kg	13 March
Gold	Abdelaziz Ben Ammar	Judo	Men's −90 kg	14 March
Gold	Koussay Ben Ghars	Judo	Men's −100 kg	14 March
Gold	A Harbi; A Ben Chalbi; A Ben Ammar; Y Kouraichi; K Ben Ghares; W Hdiouech / C Sidaoui; M Jmour; O Romdhani; M Jmour; S Mzougui; Z Troudi	Judo	Mixed teams	15 March
Gold	Mohamed Khalil Jendoubi	Taekwondo	Men's −63 kg	17 March
Gold	Ouhoud Ben Aoun	Taekwondo	Women's −53 kg	17 March
Gold	Chaima Toumi	Taekwondo	Women's −57 kg	18 March
Gold	Ikram Dahri	Taekwondo	Women's −49 kg	19 March
Gold	Firas Katoussi	Taekwondo	Men's −80 kg	20 March
Gold	Masghouni Wafa	Taekwondo	Women's −62 kg	20 March
Gold	Aziz Dougaz; Skander Mansouri	Tennis	Men's doubles	21 March
Gold	Moez Echargui	Tennis	Men's singles	21 March
Gold	Bochra Guezguez; Imen Akermi; Feiza Ayari	Taekwondo	Women's under 30 team	22 March
Gold	Imen Akermi	Taekwondo	Women's under 30	22 March
Gold	Yassmin Zekri	Taekwondo	Women's under 40	22 March
Gold	Aziz Dougaz; Moez Echargui; Skander Mansouri	Tennis	Men's team	23 March
Silver	Wafa Mahjoub	Karate	Women's kumite −61 kg	7 March
Silver	Wissal Ezzar	Karate	Women's kumite −68 kg	7 March
Silver	Iheb Ferchichi	Karate	Men's kumite −60 kg	8 March
Silver	Radhouane Chebbi	Wrestling	Men's Greco-Roman 130 kg	9 March
Silver	Fadwa Garci; Abir Haj Salah	Table tennis	Women's doubles	10 March
Silver	Amine Bouhijba	Weightlifting	Men's 61 kg snatch	10 March
Silver	Ayoub Salem	Weightlifting	Men's 67 kg snatch	11 March
Silver	Eya Aouadi	Weightlifting	Women's 55 kg total	11 March
Silver	Eya Aouadi	Weightlifting	Women's 55 kg clean & jerk	11 March
Silver	Fraj Dhouibi	Judo	Men's −60 kg	12 March
Silver	Aziz Harbi	Judo	Men's −66 kg	12 March
Silver	Hamza Ben Amor	Weightlifting	Men's 81 kg snatch	12 March
Silver	Chaima Rahmouni	Weightlifting	Women's 64 kg total	12 March
Silver	Chaima Rahmouni	Weightlifting	Women's 64 kg snatch	12 March
Silver	Chaima Rahmouni	Weightlifting	Women's 64 kg clean & jerk	12 March
Silver	Jawaher Gasmi	Weightlifting	Women's 71 kg total	12 March
Silver	Jawaher Gasmi	Weightlifting	Women's 71 kg snatch	12 March
Silver	Jawaher Gasmi	Weightlifting	Women's 71 kg clean & jerk	12 March
Silver	Arij Akkab	Judo	Women's −78 kg	14 March
Silver	Sarra Mzougui	Judo	Women's +78 kg	14 March
Silver	Dorra Mahfoudhi	Athletics	Women's pole vault	19 March
Silver	Motaz Ifaoui	Taekwondo	Men's −87 kg	19 March
Silver	Mohsen Mohamed Anani	Athletics	Men's hammer throw	21 March
Silver	Wafa Hafsi	Boxing	Women's −48 kg	22 March
Silver	Molka Ben Mabrouk	Boxing	Women's −75 kg	22 March
Silver	Yassine Rahmeni; Mohamed Aziz Bellakhel; Koussay Rezgui	Taekwondo	Men's under 30 team	22 March
Silver	Tunisia	Volleyball	Women's tournament	23 March
Bronze	Chehinez Jemi	Karate	Women's kumite +68 kg	7 March
Bronze	Youssef Ben Attia; Wassim Essid; Khalil Sta	Table tennis	Men's team	8 March
Bronze	Houssem Edine Choiya; Laith Haddaji; Iheb Ferchichi; Ramez Bouallagui; Mouhib Abid; Nassim Nacef; Youssef Djeridi	Karate	Men's kumite team	9 March
Bronze	Fadwa Garci; Abir Haj Salah; Maram Zoghlami	Table tennis	Women's team	8 March
Bronze	Radhwen Tarhouni	Wrestling	Men's Greco-Roman 77 kg	9 March
Bronze	Mohamed Jabri	Wrestling	Men's Greco-Roman 97 kg	9 March
Bronze	Amine Bouhijba	Weightlifting	Men's 61 kg total	10 March
Bronze	Amine Bouhijba	Weightlifting	Men's 61 kg clean & jerk	10 March
Bronze	Tasnim Ben Wada	Weightlifting	Women's 49 kg total	10 March
Bronze	Ayoub Salem	Weightlifting	Men's 67 kg total	11 March
Bronze	Ayoub Salem	Weightlifting	Men's 67 kg clean & jerk	11 March
Bronze	Eya Aouadi	Weightlifting	Women's 55 kg snatch	11 March
Bronze	Israa Bejaoui	Weightlifting	Women's 59 kg total	11 March
Bronze	Israa Bejaoui	Weightlifting	Women's 59 kg snatch	11 March
Bronze	Israa Bejaoui	Weightlifting	Women's 59 kg clean & jerk	11 March
Bronze	Mohamed Ben Hafsia	Wrestling	Men's freestyle 65 kg	11 March
Bronze	Chaima Sidaoui	Judo	Women's −57 kg	12 March
Bronze	Mariem Jmour	Judo	Women's −57 kg	12 March
Bronze	Slim Bchini	Weightlifting	Men's 89 kg snatch	12 March
Bronze	Ons Romdhani	Judo	Women's −63 kg	13 March
Bronze	Maram Jmour	Judo	Women's −70 kg	13 March
Bronze	Yassine Kouraichi	Judo	Men's −90 kg	14 March
Bronze	Wahib Hdiouech	Judo	Men's +100 kg	14 March
Bronze	Ezzedine Maik Lahmadi	Weightlifting	Men's +109 kg total	14 March
Bronze	Ezzedine Maik Lahmadi	Weightlifting	Men's +109 kg snatch	14 March
Bronze	Ezzedine Maik Lahmadi	Weightlifting	Men's +109 kg clean & jerk	14 March
Bronze	Zeineb Naoui	Weightlifting	Women's 87 kg total	14 March
Bronze	Zeineb Naoui	Weightlifting	Women's 87 kg snatch	14 March
Bronze	Zeineb Naoui	Weightlifting	Women's 87 kg clean & jerk	14 March
Bronze	Tunisia	Rugby sevens	Women's tournament	21 March
Bronze	Moez Echargui; Aziz Ouakaa	Tennis	Men's doubles	21 March
Bronze	Aziz Dougaz	Tennis	Men's singles	21 March
Bronze	Zakaria Romdhani	Boxing	Men's −67 kg	22 March
Bronze	Chadha Jlassi	Boxing	Women's −52 kg	22 March
Bronze	Khouloud Hlimi	Boxing	Women's −57 kg	22 March
Bronze	Azza Nahdi	Boxing	Women's −60 kg	22 March
Bronze	Iben Zina Eya	Boxing	Women's −70 kg	22 March
Bronze	Foued Ben El Derouich	Taekwondo	Men's over 17	22 March
