= Sabrina Latreche =

Algerian chess player

Personal information
- Born: July 30, 1993 (age 32)

Chess career
- Country: Algeria
- Title: Woman International Master (2012)
- Peak rating: 2091 (September 2021)

Sabrina Latreche (born 30 July 1993) is an Algerian chess player.

She has been a Woman International Master (WIM) since 2011 She won the African championship under 16 years in South Africa 2009 She was part of the Algerian team which won the team gold medal in All Arab games 2011 in Qatar She was the winner of the 2014 and 2016 Women's Arab Chess Championship, and 2018 Arab chess championship blitz.

She won the Algerian Women's chess championship five times: in 2011 and four times in a row from 2015 to 2018.

She represented Algeria at seven Olympiads from 2006 to 2018.

She won a gold medal for the second board at Chess at the 2011 All-Africa Games, and was part of the Algerian team which won the team silver medal.

She played in the Women's World Chess Championship 2017 and she is qualified for the Women's World Chess Championship 2020
