= United Arab Republic at the 1965 All-Africa Games =

- IOC code: UAR
- NOC: Egyptian Olympic Committee

in Brazzaville
- Medals Ranked 1st: Gold 17 Silver 10 Bronze 3 Total 30

All-Africa Games appearances
- 1965; 1973; 1978; 1987; 1991; 1995; 1999; 2003; 2007; 2011; 2015; 2019; 2023

Youth appearances
- 2010*; *As Egypt

Egypt, as United Arab Republic participated at the 1965 All-Africa Games held in the city of Brazzaville, Congo-Brazzaville.
