= Franca Audu =

Nigerian judoka (born 1991)

Personal information
- Born: 14 February 1991 (age 35)
- Occupation: Judoka

Sport
- Country: Nigeria
- Sport: Judo
- Weight class: ‍–‍52 kg

Achievements and titles
- World Champ.: R64 (2011)
- African Champ.: (bronze) (2010)
Medal record
Women's judo
Representing Nigeria
African Games
| Bronze medal – third place | 2015 Brazzaville | ‍–‍52 kg |
| Bronze medal – third place | 2023 Accra | ‍–‍52 kg |
African Championships
| Bronze medal – third place | 2010 Yaounde | ‍–‍48 kg |

Profile at external databases
- IJF: 6927
- JudoInside.com: 47324
- Updated on 17 March 2024

Franca Audu (born 14 February 1991) is a Nigerian judoka who competed in the women's U48kg and U52kg category. She won a bronze medal at the 2010 African Judo Championships and 2 bronze medals at the All-Africa Games in 2015 and 2023.

== Sports career ==
In 2010, she participated in the African Judo Championships held in Yaoundé, Tunisia, Audu won a gold medal in the women's 48 kg.

Franca Audu won a bronze medal in the 48 kg event at the Africa Games held in Maputo, Mozambique in 2011. Also at the same competition in 2015 which was held in Brazzaville, Republic of the Congo, she won another bronze medal.

== See also ==
- Judo at the 2011 All-Africa Games
