= Bridgitte Hartley =

South African canoeist

Personal information
- Full name: Bridgitte Ellen Hartley
- Born: 14 July 1983 (age 43) Sandton, South Africa
- Height: 1.72 m (5 ft 8 in)
- Weight: 66 kg (146 lb)

Sport
- Country: South Africa
- Sport: Canoe sprint
- Club: Natal Canoe Club
Medal record
Women's canoe sprint
Representing South Africa
Olympic Games
Bronze medal – third place	2012 London	K-1 500m
World Championships
Bronze medal – third place	2009 Dartmouth	K-1 1000 m
Bronze medal – third place	2014 Moscow	K-1 500 m
Bronze medal – third place	2018 Montemor-o-Velho	K-1 1000 m
All-Africa Games
Gold medal – first place	2011 Maputo	K-1 200m
Gold medal – first place	2011 Maputo	K-1 500m
Gold medal – first place	2011 Maputo	K-2 500m
African Games
Gold medal – first place	2019 Rabat	K-2 200 m
Gold medal – first place	2019 Rabat	K-2 500 m

Bridgitte Ellen Hartley (born 14 July 1983) is a South African canoe sprinter who has competed since the late 2000s. She won a bronze medal in the K-1 1000 m event at the 2009 ICF Canoe Sprint World Championships in Dartmouth. Three years later, at the 2012 Olympic Games in London, Bridgitte again won the bronze medal, this time in the K-1 (Kayak Singles – Women) 500m event. In August 2014, she replicated her Olympic form, and at the ICF Canoe Sprint World Championships in Moscow she picked up a third career bronze model in international competition. Hartley became the first person from both South Africa and the African continent to medal at the ICF Canoe Sprint World Championships. Hartley also competed in the K-2 500 m event at the 2008 Summer Olympics in Beijing, but was eliminated in the semifinals.

Hartley competed at the 2016 Summer Olympics in Rio de Janeiro. In the women's K-1 200 m event, she finished in 13th place. In the women's K-1 500 m event, she finished in 16th place.

In February 2022, she was elected as chair of the International Canoe Federation's (ICF) Athlete Committee.

== Early life ==
Hartley was born in Sandton, a suburb of Johannesburg. Her family moved to Richards Bay in her youth, where she took up surfing. She attended Pretoria High School for Girls where she excelled at sports. After high school, Hartley attended the University of Pretoria.

== Affiliations ==
- TuksSport – University of Pretoria, South Africa
