= Afef Ben Ismail =

Tunisian canoeist (born 1994)

Personal information
- Nationality: Tunisia
- Born: March 17, 1994 (age 32)
- Height: 173 cm (5 ft 8 in)
- Weight: 60 kg (132 lb)

Sport
- Sport: Sprint Canoe
- Coached by: Samia Ouertani
Medal record
Women's sprint canoe
Representing Tunisia
All-Africa Games
Silver medal – second place	2011 Maputo	K-1 200m
Silver medal – second place	2011 Maputo	K-1 500m

Afef Ben Ismail (Arabic: عفاف بن إسماعيل, born 17 March 1994 in Tunis) is a Tunisian sprint canoeist.

She competed at the 2012 Summer Olympics in London, United Kingdom, in the women's K-1 500 metres where she finished sixth in her semifinal and failed to qualify for the final.

She competed in the women's K-2 500 metres with Khaoula Sassi at the 2020 Summer Olympics.
