= Tunisia at the 1999 All-Africa Games =

- IOC code: TUN
- NOC: Tunisian Olympic Committee
- Medals Ranked 4th: Gold 20 Silver 20 Bronze 23 Total 63

1999 All-Africa Games appearances (overview)
- 1965; 1973; 1978; 1987; 1991; 1995; 1999; 2003; 2007; 2011

Youth appearances
- 2010

Tunisia participated in the 1999 All-Africa Games along with other 51 African countries, the1999 All-Africa Games was the seventh edition of the All-Africa Games held in Greater Johannesburg, South Africa between 10-19 September 1999. The Tunisia team won 63 medals.

== Medal summary ==
=== Medal table ===
Sport	Gold	Silver	Bronze	Total
Athletics				
Boxing				
Canoeing				
Chess				
Cycling				
Football				
Handball				
Judo				
Karate				
Sailing				
Swimming				
Table tennis				
Taekwondo				
Tennis				
Volleyball				
Total				

== See also ==
- Tunisia at the All-Africa Games
