= Khathia Bâ =

Senegalese canoeist (born 1990)

Khathia Bâ (born October 22, 1990 in Dakar) is a Senegalese sprint canoer who competed in the late 2000s. At the 2008 Summer Olympics in Beijing, she was eliminated in the heats of the K-1 500 m event.
