= Karim Maamoun =

Egyptian tennis player

- Country (sports): Egypt
- Born: 18 November 1979 (age 45); Egypt
- Plays: Right-handed
- Prize money: $95,738

Singles
- Career record: 9-12
- Career titles: 0
- Highest ranking: No. 283 (22 March 2010)

Doubles
- Career record: 3–9
- Career titles: 0
- Highest ranking: No. 325 (16 October 2000)
Medal record
Representing Egypt
Men's Tennis
All-Africa Games
Gold medal – first place	2011 Maputo	Team Event
Bronze medal – third place	2011 Maputo	Doubles

Karim Maamoun (born 18 November 1979) is an Egyptian tennis player.
