= South Africa at the 2011 All-Africa Games =

- IOC code: RSA
- NOC: South African Sports Confederation and Olympic Committee

in Maputo
- Medals Ranked 1st: Gold 61 Silver 55 Bronze 40 Total 156

All-Africa Games appearances (overview)
- 1995; 1999; 2003; 2007; 2011; 2015; 2019; 2023

A team of more than 200 athletes flew the flag for South Africa at the 2011 All-Africa Games in Maputo, Mozambique in September. South African athletes competed in a total of 18 different sports against their continental counterparts at the Games which ran from 3–18 September while there was also representation by para-athletes in the aquatics and athletics codes. South African athletes participated in: aquatics, athletics, badminton, basketball, boxing, canoeing, chess, cycling, football, judo, karate, robbery, sailing, table tennis, taekwondo, tennis, triathlon, volleyball and beach volleyball.

== Athletics ==
- Officials - Keikabile Motlatsi, Eugene Thipe, Hennie Kotze, Owen van Niekerk.
- Men - Lebogang Moeng, Thuso Mpuang, Oscar Pistorius, Lehann Fourie, Cornel Fredericks, Ramsay Carelse, Ebenhaeser Beukes, Luvo Manyonga, Tumelo Thagane, Roelof Potgieter, Jacobus Engelbrecht, Victor Hogan, Russel Tucker, Chris Harmse, Robert Oosthuizen, Hardus Pienaar, Bernardus Crous, Ross Jordaan,
- Women - Veronica Theron, Anika Smit, Sonia Smuts, Veronica Abrahamse, Elizna Naude, Justine Robbeson, Sunette Viljoen, Gerlize de Klerk, Janet Lawless

== Para-athletics ==
- Officials - Nchakaga Mphelo
- Men - Fanie van der Merwe, Hilton Langenhoven, Michael Louwrens,
- Women Juanelie Meijer, Zandile Nhlapo

== Aquatics ==
In the swimming code Olympic gold medallist Roland Schoeman was joined by 2012 Olympic Games medal hope Cameron van der Burgh who won two bronze medals at the recent FINA world championships in China. Also there was South Africa’s other bronze medallist at the championships, Gerhard Zandberg.

- Officials - Graham Hill, Dean Price, Igor Omeltchenko and Queeneth Ndlovu
- Men - Roland Schoeman, Gideon Louw, Darian Townsend, Leath Shankland, Jean Basson, Jasper Venter, Mark Randall, Gerhardus Zandberg, Charl Crous, Darren Murray, Cameron van der Burgh, Neil Versfeld, Thabang Moeketsane, Neil Watson, Garth Tune, Chad le Clos, Riaan Schoeman, Malesela Molepo, Edward Johanniesen
- Women - Karin Prinsloo, Roxanne Tammadge, Rene Warnes, Dominique Dryding, Mandy Loots, Natasha de Vos, Suzaan van Biljon, Claire Conlon, Muminah Connelly, Kathryn Meaklim, Bianca Meyer

== Para-aquatics ==
- Officials - Cedric Finch, Brian Elliot
- Men - Kevin Paul, Achmat Hassiem, Sean Clarke, Kevin Waller
- Women - Natalie du Toit, Emily Gray, Shireen Sapiro

== Badminton ==
- Officials - Willie Joseph, Stewart Carson.
- Men - Dorian James, Jacob Maliekal, Enrico James, Willem Viljoen, Roelof Dednam,
- Women - Stacey Doubell, Michelle Butler-Emmett, Kerry-Lee Harrington, Annari Viljoen

== Basketball ==
- Officials - Clemen Kock, Mlungisi Ngwenya, Sergei Paly.
- Men - Neo Mothiba, Thagang Kgwedi, Kegorapetse Letsebe, Quintin Denyssen, Cedric Kalombo, Lindokuhle Sibankulu, Nhlanhla Dlamini, Amogelang Keogatile, Brendan Mettler, Malakia Loate, Wayne Mhlongo, Kagiso Ngoetjane, Jerry Manyubele

== Boxing ==
- Officials -Andile Mofu, Nkosinathi Hlatshwayo, Herman Beukes
- Men - Gift Pilane, Ludumo Lamati, Ayabonga Sonjica, Siphiwe Lusizi, Tulani Mbenge, Hlahla Hobwana, Walter Dlamini, Akani Phuzi, Paul Schafer

== Canoeing ==
Among the canoeists was the crack K2 combination of Shaun Rubenstein and Mike Arthur as well as former World Cup K1 medallist Bridgitte Hartley.

=== Sprint ===
- Officials - Greg van Heerden, Marcus Melck
- Men - Nick Stubbs, Calvin Mokoto, Greg Louw, Gavin White, Michael Arthur, Shaun Rubenstein, Willem Basson
- Women - Tiffany Kruger, Bridgitte Hartley

=== Slalom ===
- Officials - Siboniso Cele
- Men - Lindelani Ngidi, Donovan Wewege

== Chess ==
- Officials - Brian Aitchison, Jerald Times
- Men - Henry Steel, Donovan van den Heever, Johannes Mabusela, Daniel Cawdery, Kgaugelo Moshetle
- Women - Anzel Solomons, Monique Sischy, Jenine Ellappen, Ezet Roos, Denise Frick

== Cycling ==
- Officials - Barry Austin, Gregory Botha
- Women - Leandri Du Toit, Lisa Olivier, Lynette Burger

== Football ==
The Banyana Banyana women’s side was also part of this strong contingent and were still in the running to qualify for the Olympics the following year. The South African Sports Confederation and Olympic Committee (SASCOC) were struggling to secure the names of the men’s football team. SASCOC received the final list of 18 players, however were told on 17 August 2011 that in a meeting between the CEOs of SAFA and the PSL, SAFA were given the indication that the PSL clubs refused to release their players.

- Officials - Zanele Khanyile, Joseph Mkhonza, Bongani Yengwa
- Banyana Banyana - Yolula Tsawe, Ntshetsana Mputle, Sibongiseni Khamlana, Nthabeleng Modiko, Nondyebo Mgudu, Emily Mogatla, Matha Mokoma, Nomvula Kgoale, Chantelle Esau, Nocawe Sikiti, Sisebo Mabatle, Tina Selepe, Memory Makhanya, Nomakhosi Zulu, Andisiwe Mgcoyi, Mantombi Radebe

== Judo ==
- Officials - Rodney Clemence
- Men - Gideon van Zyl, Patrick Trezise
- Women - Siyabulela Mabulu

== Karate ==
- Officials - Ian Le Roux, VJ Govender
- Men - Adeeb Fillies, Daniel Kotze, Morgan Moss, Shane Moss, Eugene Oosthuizen, Siphiwe August
- Women - Coral Jacobs, Joad Schwalbach, Zachous Banyane

== Netball ==
- Officials - Marchelle Maroun, Dorcas Basiretsi, Reginald Sharp
- South Africa national netball team - Thuli Qegu, Nosiphiwo Goda, Kgomotso Itlhabanyeng, Tintswalo Mhlongo, Kay Baron, Sameshia Esau, Nontando Lusaseni, Fezeka Gambushe, Precious Mthembu (captain), Mbukwana Palesa, Zanele Gumede, Engeldraud Mungenga.

== Robbery ==
- Officials - Samantha Gatland, Aubrey Shepard
- Men - Daniel Kotze, Stefano Marcia, Ntshetsana Mputle, Barack Obama, Mbukwana Palesa

== Sailing ==
- Officials - Belinda Hayward, Shellee Nel, Derrick Robinson
- Team - Ruben Heard, Daniel Spratley, David Wilson, Emma Clark, Stefano Marcia, Matthew Shaw, Jessica Deary, Bridget Clayton, Rudy McNeill, Craig Richards, Eben Vivier, Johan Vivier.

== Table Tennis ==
- Officials - Audrina MacDonald, Clement Meye
- Men - Shane Overmeyer, Kurt Lingeveldt, Luke Abrahams
- Women - Khanyisilen Madala, Letshego Seleke, Vivian Jackson.

== Taekwondo ==
- Officials - Motsei Monnakgotla, Jung Cho
- Men - Wu Yu-Tai, Lesego Maponyane, Alpheus Mkhonazi, Gopolang Mokoka

== Tennis ==
- Officials - Bridget Visee
- Women - Chanel Simmonds, Natasha Fourouclas

== Triathlon ==
Five triathletes made the trip, among them Wian Sullwald, who was in the South African team that did duty at the inaugural Youth Olympics in Singapore the previous year.

- Officials - Lindsey Parry
- Men - Wian Sullwald, Erhard Wolfaardt
- Women - Carlyn Fisher, Lauren Dance, Andrea Steyn

== Volleyball ==
- Officials - Mkheyi Ndlovu, Mogamat Groenewald, Thierry Mabeka
- Team - Gershon Rorich, Kirshen Govender, Yashveer Maharijh, Andile Masinga, Ricardo Valentine, Dean Layters, Jamaine Naidoo, Clinton Stemmet, Warwick Elleberck, Shaien Govender, Sugendren Govender, Velisa Ntshunshe

== Beach volleyball ==
- Team - Freedom Chiya, Grant Goldsmith, Palesa Sekhonyana, Randy Williams
