= Taekwondo at the 2011 All-Africa Games =

Taekwondo competition

Taekwondo at the All-Africa Games

Taekwondo at the 2011 All-Africa Games in Maputo, Mozambique was held on September 14–17, 2011.

== Medal summary ==
=== Men ===
Event	Gold	Silver	Bronze
−54 kg	Mokdad Lyamine (ALG)	Sherif Shaaban (EGY)	Usman Sulalman (NGA); Stephen Karuga Njoki (KEN)
−58 kg	Mohammad Tariq Jamilu (NGR)	Hamza Gbané (CIV)	Yu Feng Wu (RSA); Dickson wamwiri (KEN)
−63 kg	Wahid Briki (TUN)	Khalifa Ababacar Sarr (SEN)	Ahmed Amr Suleiman (EGY); Botalatala Litofo Cedrick (DRC)
−68 kg	Stephane Moundounga Kombila (GAB)	Nidha Sbouaï (TUN)	Jean Noël Obou Seri (CIV); Isah Adam Mohammad (NGR)
−74 kg	Gorome Kare (SEN)	Seifeddine Trabelsi (TUN)	Ismael Coulibaly (MLI); Sunday Onofe (NGR)
−80 kg	Abdelrahman Osama Tawfik (EGY)	Yassine Trabelsi (TUN)	N'Guessan Sebastien Konan (CIV); Oumar Cissé (MLI)
−87 kg	Ushe Shukwumerije (NGR)	Anthony Obame (GAB)	Fatao Al Hassan (GHA); Issa Bamba (CIV)
+ 87 kg	Firmin Saint Nom Zokou (CIV)	Chika Chukwumerije (NGR)	Kelvin Viriato (MOZ); Pierre Nyok Nyok (CMR)

=== Women ===
Event	Gold	Silver	Bronze
−46 kg	Aya Roubi Farhat Ali (EGY)	Bolili Miambanzila Parker (DRC)	Mareshet Zeudu Weldehana (ETH); Khady Fall (SEN)
−49 kg	Aminata Makou Traoré (MLI)	Radwa Reda (EGY)	Lineo Mochesane (LES); Joy Ekhator (NGR)
−53 kg	Rahma Ben Ali (TUN)	Yemata Meiat Getachew (ETH)	Divine Aide Omo (NGR); Brenda Mahonza Aldine (DRC)
−57 kg	Hedaya Malak (EGY)	Bineta Diedhiou (SEN)	Ruth Gbagbi (CIV); Nana-Or Goundo (CGO)
−62 kg	Urgence Mouega Mouega (GAB)	Begashaw Netsanet Fekadu (ETH)	Marie Louise Ngo Ebem (CMR); Sarah Njoki (KEN)
−67 kg	Seham El Sawalhy (EGY)	Gladys Mwaniki (KEN)	Sanele Ginindza (SWZ); Sandra Antonio (ANG)
−73 kg	Alimatou Diallo (SEN)	Aminata Doumbia (MLI)	Sonogo Affoue (CIV); Leka Mini Baridam (NGR)
+ 73 kg	Khaoula Ben Hamza (TUN)	Linda Azzedine (ALG)	Sithandile Dlamini (SWZ); Joyce Joseph Malfil (NGR)

== Medals table ==
Rank	Nation	Gold	Silver	Bronze	Total
1	Egypt (EGY)	4	2	1	7
2	Tunisia (TUN)	3	3	0	6
3	Senegal (SEN)	2	2	1	5
4	Nigeria (NGR)	2	1	7	10
5	Gabon (GAB)	2	1	0	3
6	Ivory Coast (CIV)	1	1	5	7
7	Mali (MLI)	1	1	2	4
8	Algeria (ALG)	1	1	0	2
9	Ethiopia (ETH)	0	2	1	3
10	Kenya (KEN)	0	1	3	4
11	DR Congo (COD)	0	1	2	3
12	Cameroon (CMR)	0	0	2	2
12	Eswatini (SWZ)	0	0	2	2
14	Angola (ANG)	0	0	1	1
14	Congo (CGO)	0	0	1	1
14	Ghana (GHA)	0	0	1	1
14	Lesotho (LES)	0	0	1	1
14	Mozambique (MOZ)	0	0	1	1
14	South Africa (RSA)	0	0	1	1
Totals (19 entries)		16	16	32	64
