= Chess at the 2011 All-Africa Games =

The chess events at the 2011 All-Africa Games in Maputo, Mozambique were held on September 5–13, 2011.

== Participating nations ==
- Algeria
- Angola
- Botswana
- Egypt
- Ethiopia
- Ghana
- Kenya
- Madagascar
- Mozambique
- Namibia
- Nigeria
- South Africa
- Zambia
- Zimbabwe

== Medal summary ==
Event	Gold		Silver		Bronze	
Men's team	Egypt	18 pts	South Africa	16 pts	Angola	13 pts
Men's team – board performances	Robert Gwaze (ZIM)	92.85%	Henry Robert Steel (RSA)	87.50%	Ahmed Adly (EGY)	81.25%
Men's team – board performances	João Simões (ANG)	87.50%	Daniel Jere (ZAM)	83.33%	Samy Shoker (EGY)	81.25%
Men's team – board performances	Amorim Agnelo (ANG)	91.66%	Moakofi Notha (BOT)	83.33%	Essam El-Gindy (EGY)	78.57%
Men's team – board performances	Mohamed Ezat (EGY)	91.66%	Johannes Mabusela (RSA)	83.33%	Catarino Domingos (ANG)	81.25%
Men's team – board performances	Bunmi Olape (NGR)	92.85%	Kgaugelo Mosetlhe (RSA)	91.66%	Khaled Abdelrazik (EGY)	85.71%
Women's team	Egypt	13 pts	Algeria	10 pts	South Africa	9 pts
Women's team – board performances	Imane El Ansary (EGY)	85.71%	Amina Mezioud (ALG)	78.57%	Monique Sischy (RSA)	71.42%
Women's team – board performances	Sabrina Latreche (ALG)	100%	Boikhutso Mudongo (BOT)	64.28%	Anzel Solomons (RSA)	58.33%
Women's team – board performances	Mona Khaled (EGY)	90%	Khadidja Latreche (ALG)	83.33%	Vânia Vilhete (MOZ)	70%
Women's team – board performances	Shrook Wafa (EGY)	85.71%	Ezet Roos (RSA)	60%	Ontiretse Sabure (BOT)	50%
Women's team – board performances	Oluwatobiloba Olatunji (NGR)	90%	Denise Frick (RSA)	70%	Feriel Lalaoui (ALG)	70%
Men's individual	Ahmed Adly; Egypt	7½	Tarek Goutali; Algeria	7	Daniel Jere; Zambia	7
Women's individual	Amina Mezioud; Algeria	8½	Mona Khaled; Egypt	7	Monique Sischy; South Africa	6½

== Medals table ==
* Host nation (Mozambique)

Rank	Nation	Gold	Silver	Bronze	Total
1	Egypt (EGY)	7	1	4	12
2	Algeria (ALG)	2	4	1	7
3	Angola (ANG)	2	0	2	4
4	Nigeria (NGR)	2	0	0	2
5	Zimbabwe (ZIM)	1	0	0	1
6	South Africa (RSA)	0	6	4	10
7	Botswana (BOT)	0	2	1	3
8	Zambia (ZAM)	0	1	1	2
9	Mozambique (MOZ)*	0	0	1	1
Totals (9 entries)		14	14	14	42
