= Canoeing at the 2011 All-Africa Games =

- Location: Maputo, Mozambique
- Dates: September 6 – 11, 2011

Canoeing at the 2011 All-Africa Games in Maputo, Mozambique was held between September 6–11, 2011.

== Medal summary ==
=== Slalom ===
Event	Gold	Silver	Bronze
Men's C-1	Nadjib Mazar (ALG)	Cyprian Ngidi (RSA)	Ndiate Gueye (SEN)
Men's K-1	Donavan Wewege (RSA)	Nadjib Mazar (ALG)	Mrabet Mohamed Ali (TUN)
Women's K-1	Afef Ben Samil (TUN)	Lilian Japhet (NGR)	Madjiguène Seck (SEN)

=== Sprint ===
Men

Event	Gold	Silver	Bronze
C-1 200 metres	Khaled Bargaoui (TUN)	Calvin Gaebolae Mokoto (RSA)	Altamiro Ferreira De Ceira (STP)
C-1 1000 metres	Calvin Gaebolae Mokoto (RSA)	Khaled Bargaoui (TUN)	Henriques Nelson (ANG)
C-2 1000 metres	Kenya; Josphat Ngali; Joseph Ngugu	Angola; Nelson Henriques; Fortunato Pacavira	Mozambique; Joaquim Lobo; Mussa Tualibudine
K-1 200 metres	Greg Ricky Louw (RSA)	Mrabet Mohamed Ali (TUN)	Mostafa Said (EGY)
K-1 1000 metres	Mrabet Mohamed Ali (TUN)	Nicholas John Stubbs (RSA)	Ousmane Goudiam Fall (SEN)
K-2 200 metres	South Africa; Mike Arthur; Shaun Rubinstein	Algeria; Abdelmalek Azaoun; Yanis Nouioua	Angola; Nazare Neves; Joelson Samuel
K-2 1000 metres	South Africa; Pieter Willem Boasson; Gavin White	Algeria; Nasreddine Baghdadi; Yanis Nouioua	Kenya; Kevin Nbango; Vincent Oundoh
PC-1 200 metres	Josemar Andrade (ANG)	Swaleh Yunis (KEN)	

Women

Event	Gold	Silver	Bronze
C-1 200 metres	Fátima António (ANG)	Madjiguène Seck (SEN)	Lilian Jepheth (NGA)
K-1 200 metres	Bridgitte Ellen Hartley (RSA)	Afef Ben Ismail (TUN)	Khatia Ba (SEN)
K-1 500 metres	Bridgitte Ellen Hartley (RSA)	Afef Ben Ismail (TUN)	Khatia Ba (SEN)
K-2 500 metres	South Africa; Bridgitte Ellen Hartley; Tiffany Kruger	Kenya; Diana Natecho; Mooren Rono	Nigeria; Adeola Iwajomo; Lilian Japhet

== Medals table ==
Rank	Nation	Gold	Silver	Bronze	Total
1	South Africa (RSA)	8	3	0	11
2	Tunisia (TUN)	3	4	1	8
3	Angola (ANG)	2	1	2	5
4	Algeria (ALG)	1	3	0	4
5	Kenya (KEN)	1	2	1	4
6	Senegal (SEN)	0	1	5	6
7	Nigeria (NGA)	0	1	2	3
8	Egypt (EGY)	0	0	1	1
8	Mozambique (MOZ)	0	0	1	1
8	São Tomé and Príncipe (STP)	0	0	1	1
Totals (10 entries)		15	15	14	44
