= Judo at the 2011 All-Africa Games =

Judo competition

Judo Judo at the 2011 All-Africa Games
- Venue: Maputo
- Location: Maputo, Mozambique
- Dates: 4–6 September 2011

Competition at external databases
- Links: JudoInside

Judo at the 2011 All-Africa Games in Maputo, Mozambique was held on September 4–6, 2011.

== Medal summary ==
=== Men ===
Event	Gold	Silver	Bronze
−60 kg	Lyes Saker (ALG)	Eniafe Solomon (NGA)	Nayr Pedro (ANG); Mohamed El Hadi Elkawisah (LBA)
−66 kg	Ahmed Awad (EGY)	Youcef Nouari (ALG)	Hocem Khalfaoui (TUN); Siyabulela Mabulu (RSA)
−73 kg	Larbi Grini (ALG)	Gideon Van Zyl (RSA)	Hussein Hafiz (EGY); Nsa Bassey-Isa (NGR)
−81 kg	Abderahmane Benamadi (ALG)	Ângelo António (ANG)	Jude Solomon (NGR); Fetra Ratsimiziva (MAD)
−90 kg	Hesham Mesbah (EGY)	Lyes Bouyacoub (ALG)	Dieudonné Dolassem (CMR); Kinapeya Kone (CIV)
−100 kg	Franck Moussima (CMR)	Ramadan Darwish (EGY)	Kambere SHabani (COD); Yacine Meskine (ALG)
+100 kg	Faicel Jaballah (TUN)	Islam El Shebaby (EGY)	Joseph Bebeze (CMR); Bilal Zouani (ALG)

=== Women ===
Event	Gold	Silver	Bronze
−48 kg	Amani Khalfaoui (TUN)	Sandrine Ilendou (GAB)	Franka Audu (NGA); Sabrina Saidi (ALG)
−52 kg	Soraya Haddad (ALG)	Ngandeu Weyinjam (CMR)	Victoria Agbodobiri (NGA); Sando Esther (ZAM)
−57 kg	Nesria Jelassi (TUN)	Hortense Diedhiou (SEN)	Grace Deutcho (CMR); Raissa Lebomie (NGR)
−63 kg	Séverine Nébié (BFA)	Esther Augustyne (NGR)	Saidi Kahina (ALG); Fary Seye (SEN)
−70 kg	Houda Miled (TUN)	Antónia Moreira (ANG)	Mbala Felicité (CMR); Winifred Gofit (NGR)
−78 kg	Hana Mareghni (TUN)	Honorine Mafeguim (CMR)	Amina Temmar (ALG); Georgette Sagna (CMR)
+78 kg	Nihel Cheikh Rouhou (TUN)	Sonia Asselah (ALG)	Monica Sagna (SEN); Dechantal Fokou (CMR)

=== Medal table ===
Rank	Nation	Gold	Silver	Bronze	Total
1	Tunisia	6	0	1	7
2	Algeria	4	3	5	12
3	Egypt	2	2	1	5
4	Cameroon	1	2	5	8
5	Burkina Faso	1	0	0	1
6	Nigeria	0	2	5	7
7	Angola	0	2	1	3
8	Senegal	0	1	3	4
9	Gabon	0	1	1	2
9	South Africa	0	1	1	2
11	DR Congo	0	0	1	1
11	Ivory Coast	0	0	1	1
11	Libya	0	0	1	1
11	Madagascar	0	0	1	1
11	Zambia	0	0	1	1
Totals (15 entries)		14	14	28	56
