= Sailing at the 2011 All-Africa Games =

- Location: Maputo, Mozambique
- Dates: September 5 - 11

Sailing at the 2011 All-Africa Games in Maputo, Mozambique was held between September 5–11, 2011.

== Medal table ==
| Rank | Nation | Gold | Silver | Bronze | Total |
|---|---|---|---|---|---|
| 1 | South Africa | 3 | 4 | 1 | 8 |
| 2 | Tunisia | 2 | 0 | 0 | 2 |
| 3 | Seychelles | 1 | 0 | 1 | 2 |
| 4 | Algeria | 0 | 1 | 2 | 3 |
| 5 | Angola | 0 | 1 | 1 | 2 |
| 6 | Mozambique | 0 | 0 | 1 | 1 |
| Totals (6 entries) | | 6 | 6 | 6 | 18 |

== Medal summary ==
| Event | Gold | Silver | Bronze |
|---|---|---|---|
| 420 | Eben Vivier; Johan Vivier (RSA) | Gilson Tenazinha; João Montenegro (ANG) | Matias Montinho; Paixão Afonso (ANG) |
| Laser | Allan Julie (SEY) | Rudy McNeil (RSA) | Rodney Govinden (SEY) |
| Men's Laser Radial | Youssef Akrout (TUN) | Stefano Murcia (RSA) | Mohamed Midoun (ALG) |
| Women's Laser Radial | Brigdet Clayton (RSA) | Jessica Deary (RSA) | Fatima Mahmoudi (ALG) |
| Men's Optimist | David Wilson (RSA) | Abdelkhalek Boussouar (ALG) | Rubin Heard (RSA) |
| Women's Optimist | Ines Gmati (TUN) | Emma Clark (RSA) | Maria Mabjaia (MOZ) |
