= Tennis at the 2011 All-Africa Games =

Tennis event at the 2011 All-Africa Games

Tennis at the 2011 All-Africa Games in Maputo, Mozambique was held from September 11 to 17, 2011. The event featured men's and women's singles, doubles, and team competitions.

== Medal summary ==
Event	Gold	Silver	Bronze
Men's Singles	Takanyi Garanganga (ZIM)	Sherif Sabry (EGY)	Duncan Mugabe (UGA); Candy Idoko (NGR)
Women's Singles	Ons Jabeur (TUN)	Chanel Simmonds (RSA)	Mayar Sherif (EGY); Nour Abbès (TUN)
Men's Doubles	Nigeria; Clifford Enosoregbe; Onyeka Mbanu	Nigeria; Candy Idoko; Lawal Shehu	Egypt; Karim Maamoun; Sherif Sabry; Zimbabwe; Takanyi Garanganga; Mark Fynn
Women's Doubles	Egypt; Magy Aziz; Mayar Sherif	Tunisia; Ons Jabeur; Nour Abbès	Algeria; Assia Halo; Samia Medjahdi; South Africa; Natasha Fourouclas; Chanel Simmonds
Men's Team	Egypt; Karim Maamoun; Sherif Sabry	Madagascar; Ando Rasolomalala; Jacob Rasolondrazana	Nigeria
Women's Team	Tunisia; Ons Jabeur; Nour Abbès	Egypt; Magy Aziz; Mayar Sherif	Madagascar; Hariniony Andriamananarivo; Niriantsa Rasolomalala

== Medals table ==
Rank	Nation	Gold	Silver	Bronze	Total
1	Egypt (EGY)	2	2	2	6
2	Tunisia (TUN)	2	1	1	4
3	Nigeria (NGR)	1	1	2	4
4	Zimbabwe (ZIM)	1	0	1	2
5	Madagascar (MAD)	0	1	1	2
5	South Africa (RSA)	0	1	1	2
7	Algeria (ALG)	0	0	1	1
7	Uganda (UGA)	0	0	1	1
Totals (8 entries)		6	6	10	22
