= Cycling at the 2011 All-Africa Games =

Cycling competition

Cycling at the 2015 African Games
- Location: Mozambique; Maputo
- Dates: 3–18 September

Cycling at the 2011 All-Africa Games in Maputo, Mozambique was held between September 5–7, 2011.

== Medal summary ==
=== Men ===
Event	Gold	Silver	Bronze
Road race	(South Africa) Nolan Hoffman	(South Africa) Jay Thomson	(South Africa) Reinardt Janse van Rensburg
Individual time trial	(South Africa) Reinardt Janse van Rensburg	(South Africa) Darren Lill	(Algeria) Azzedine Lagab
Team time trial	South Africa	Mauritius	Algeria

=== Women ===
Event	Gold	Silver	Bronze
Road race	(South Africa) Lynette Burger	(South Africa) Lise Olivier	(Mauritius) Aurelie Halbwachs
Individual time trial	(South Africa) Lise Olivier	(Mauritius) Aurélie Halbwachs	(South Africa) Lynette Burger

== Medal table ==
Rank	Nation	Gold	Silver	Bronze	Total
1	South Africa (RSA)	5	3	2	10
2	Mauritius (MRI)	0	2	1	3
3	Algeria (ALG)	0	0	2	2
Totals (3 entries)		5	5	5	15
