= Karate at the 2011 All-Africa Games =

Karate competitions

Karate at the 2011 All-Africa Games in Maputo, Mozambique was held 9-11 September 2011.

== Medal summary ==
=== Men ===
Event	Gold	Silver	Bronze
−60kg	Abdelkrim Bouamria (ALG)	Mohamed Magdy (EGY)	Innocent Okomba (CGO); Hamadou Diallo (SEN)
−67kg	Chérif Idrissa Ba (SEN)	Houssem Halouane (ALG)	Sayed Abdennabi (EGY); Anthony Amani (KEN)
−75kg	Abdou Lahat Cisse (SEN)	Marouene Khammassi (TUN)	Walid Bouabaoub (ALG); Efezino Akpotu (NGR)
−84kg	Hany Keshta (EGY)	Mahdi Dahmouni (TUN)	Georges Franck Kom (CMR); Morgan Moss (RSA)
+84kg	Diop Abdoulaye (SEN)	Hope Adele (NGR)	Hamadani Messinissa (ALG); Mohamed Ridha Ouaz (TUN)
Kata	Ahmed Shawky (EGY)	Ofentse Oshoma (BOT)	Jaafar Islameddine (ALG); Joad Meneses (RSA)
Kata team	Egypt	Algeria	Botswana; Mozambique
Kumite team	Egypt	Republic of the Congo	Democratic Republic of the Congo; Tunisia

=== Women ===
Event	Gold	Silver	Bronze
−50kg	Yasmeen Rashed (EGY)	Dalia Chihi (ALG)	Marie Ngono (CMR); Toutou Fall (SEN)
−55kg	Ilhem Eldjou (ALG)	Dhouha Ben Othmane (TUN)	Thato Malunga (BOT); Amy Ba (SEN)
−61kg	Bouthaina Hasnaoui (TUN)	Tounko Sylla (MLI)	Mamie Bilembo (COD); Randa Fayadh (EGY)
−68kg	Faten Aissa (TUN)	Heba Abdelhamid (EGY)	Zouhira Abdelkader (ALG); Sylvie Ivrana (CMR)
+68kg	Blandine Angama (CMR)	Zeineb Kotb (EGY)	Siny Fall (SEN); Kaouther Hasnaoui (TUN)
Kata	Sarah Aly (EGY)	Kamilia Hadj Saïd (ALG)	Thato Malunga (BOT); Coral jacobs (RSA)
Kata team	Algeria	Mozambique	Botswana; Cameroon
Kumite team	Senegal	Egypt	Algeria; Tunisia

== Medals table ==
Rank	Nation	Gold	Silver	Bronze	Total
1	Egypt (EGY)	6	4	2	12
2	Senegal (SEN)	4	0	4	8
3	Algeria (ALG)	3	4	5	12
4	Tunisia (TUN)	2	3	4	9
5	Cameroon (CMR)	1	0	4	5
6	Botswana (BOT)	0	1	4	5
7	Congo (CGO)	0	1	1	2
7	Mozambique (MOZ)	0	1	1	2
7	Nigeria (NGA)	0	1	1	2
10	Mali (MLI)	0	1	0	1
11	South Africa (RSA)	0	0	3	3
12	DR Congo (COD)	0	0	2	2
13	Kenya (KEN)	0	0	1	1
Totals (13 entries)		16	16	32	64
