= Football at the 2011 All-Africa Games =

2011 All-Africa Games football tournament
Tournament details
- Host country: Mozambique
- City: Maputo
- Dates: 4–17 September 2011
- Teams: 14 (6m + 8w) (from 1 confederation)
- Venues: 3 (in 1 host city)

Final positions
- Champions: Ghana (men); Cameroon (women)
- Runners-up: South Africa (men); Ghana (women)
- Third place: Cameroon (men); Algeria (women)

Tournament statistics
- Matches played: 23
- Goals scored: 65 (2.83 per match)

The 2011 All-Africa Games football tournament was held in Maputo, Mozambique between 4–17 September 2011 as part of the 2011 All-Africa Games and featured both a men's and women's African Games football tournament. The men's tournament featured six teams, the women's eight.

== Venue ==
Maputo
Estádio do Zimpeto

Capacity: 42,000
Maputo
Estádio do Maxaquene

Capacity: 15,000
Matola
Estádio da Machava

Capacity: 45,000

== Medal summary ==
=== Results ===
| Event | Gold | Silver | Bronze |
|---|---|---|---|
| Men | Ghana | South Africa | Cameroon |
| Women | Cameroon | Ghana | Algeria |

=== Medal table ===
| Rank | Nation | Gold | Silver | Bronze | Total |
|---|---|---|---|---|---|
| 1 | Ghana | 1 | 1 | 0 | 2 |
| 2 | Cameroon | 1 | 0 | 1 | 2 |
| 3 | South Africa | 0 | 1 | 0 | 1 |
| 4 | Algeria | 0 | 0 | 1 | 1 |
| Totals (4 entries) | | 2 | 2 | 2 | 6 |
