= Volleyball at the 2011 All-Africa Games =

Volleyball at the All-Africa Games

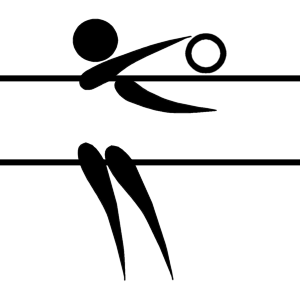

Volleyball at the 2011 All-Africa Games was held from September 6–16, 2011 at several venues.

== Events ==
=== Medal summary ===
Event	Gold	Silver	Bronze
Men	Cameroon	Algeria	Kenya
Women	Algeria	Cameroon	Kenya

=== Medal table ===
Rank	Nation	Gold	Silver	Bronze	Total
1	Algeria	1	1	0	2
1	Cameroon	1	1	0	2
3	Kenya	0	0	2	2
Totals (3 entries)		2	2	2	6
