= 2011 All-Africa Games =

Multi-sport event in Maputo, Mozambique

X All-Africa Games
- Host city: Maputo, Mozambique
- Nations: 53
- Athletes: 5000 (projected athletes, coaches, officials)
- Events: 244 in 20 sports
- Opening: 3 September 2011
- Closing: 18 September 2011
- Opened by: Armando Guebuza
- Main venue: Zimpeto Stadium
- Website: www.cojamaputo2011.org.mz

Location of Maputo in Mozambique.

The 10th All-Africa Games (Portuguese: 9os Jogos Pan-Africanos), also known as Maputo 2011, took place between September 3–18, 2011 in Maputo, Mozambique. Maputo's hosting marked the third time the Games was held in the southern part of the continent.

== Host awarding ==
In April 2005, Lusaka, Zambia was named the host of the 10th Games by the Supreme Council for Sport in Africa at a meeting in Algeria. In 2004, Ghana had indicated an interest in hosting the Games, but reportedly withdrew its bid.

In December 2008, the Zambian government withdrew its offer to host the 2011 Games, due to a lack of funds.

In April 2009, Mozambique stepped in to take on hosting duties.

== Participating nations ==
The following is a list of nations that participated in the 2011 All-Africa Games:

- Algeria (265)
- Angola
- Benin
- Botswana
- Burkina Faso
- Burundi
- Cameroon (210)
- Cape Verde
- Central African Republic
- Chad
- Comoros
- Republic of the Congo
- Ivory Coast
- Djibouti
- Democratic Republic of the Congo
- Egypt
- Equatorial Guinea
- Eritrea
- Ethiopia
- Gabon
- The Gambia
- Ghana
- Guinea
- Guinea-Bissau
- Kenya
- Lesotho
- Liberia
- Libya
- Madagascar
- Malawi
- Mali
- Mauritania
- Mauritius
- Mozambique
- Namibia
- Niger
- Nigeria
- Rwanda
- São Tomé and Príncipe
- Senegal
- Seychelles
- Sierra Leone
- Somalia
- South Africa
- South Sudan
- Sudan
- Swaziland
- Tanzania
- Togo
- Tunisia (72)
- Uganda
- Zambia
- Zimbabwe

== Sports ==
The Maputo 2011 All Africa Games featured 20 sports, 2 of which also featured disabled events (athletics and swimming). While most venues was located in and around Maputo, the Canoeing venue was in Chidenguella Lagoon, 275 km north of the city.

- Athletics (46+27)
- Badminton (6)
- Basketball (2)
- Beach volleyball (2)
- Boxing (10)
- Canoeing (15)
- Chess (12)
- Cycling (5)
- Football (2)
- Handball (2)
- Judo (14)
- Karate (16)
- Netball (1)
- Sailing (6)
- Swimming (39+6)
- Table tennis (7)
- Taekwondo (16)
- Tennis (6)
- Triathlon (2)
- Volleyball (2)

== Calendar ==
The schedule of the games was as follows. The calendar is to be completed with event finals information.

OC	Opening ceremony	●	Event competitions	1	Event finals	CC	Closing ceremony

September	2nd Fri	3rd Sat	4th Sun	5th Mon	6th Tue	7th Wed	8th Thu	9th Fri	10th Sat	11th Sun	12th Mon	13th Tue	14th Wed	15th Thu	16th Fri	17th Sat	18th Sun	Events
Ceremonies		OC															CC	
Athletics																		
Badminton																		
Basketball																		
Beach volleyball																		
Boxing																		
Canoeing																		
Chess																		
Cycling																		
Football																		
Handball																		
Judo																		
Karate																		
Netball																		
Sailing																		
Swimming																		
Table tennis																		
Taekwondo																		
Tennis																		
Triathlon																		
Volleyball																		
Total events																		
Cumulative total																		
September	2nd Fri	3rd Sat	4th Sun	5th Mon	6th Tue	7th Wed	8th Thu	9th Fri	10th Sat	11th Sun	12th Mon	13th Tue	14th Wed	15th Thu	16th Fri	17th Sat	18th Sun	Events

== Medal table ==
The 2011 All-Africa Games, was a multi-sport event held in Maputo, Mozambique from 3 to 18 September 2011. The event saw 5,000 athletes from 53 National Olympic Committees (NOCs) competing in many events in 20 sports. This medal table ranks the participating NOCs by the number of gold medals won by their athletes.

Below the final medal table after the end of the 2011 All-Africa Games.

* Host nation (Mozambique)

Rank	Nation	Gold	Silver	Bronze	Total
1	South Africa (RSA)	61	55	40	156
2	Egypt (EGY)	32	14	20	66
3	Nigeria (NGR)	31	28	39	98
4	Tunisia (TUN)	29	26	13	68
5	Algeria (ALG)	22	29	33	84
6	Kenya (KEN)	14	14	22	50
7	Senegal (SEN)	8	8	17	33
8	Cameroon (CMR)	8	5	20	33
9	Ethiopia (ETH)	6	10	12	28
10	Angola (ANG)	6	10	10	26
11	Zimbabwe (ZIM)	6	7	2	15
12	Ghana (GHA)	4	5	8	17
13	Mauritius (MRI)	4	2	7	13
14	Uganda (UGA)	4	1	3	8
15	Botswana (BOT)	2	5	9	16
16	Ivory Coast (CIV)	2	5	8	15
17	Gabon (GAB)	2	2	1	5
18	Sudan (SUD)	2	0	0	2
19	Seychelles (SEY)	1	4	9	14
20	Mali (MLI)	1	2	2	5
21	Rwanda (RWA)	1	2	0	3
22	Namibia (NAM)	1	1	5	7
23	Liberia (LBR)	1	0	1	2
24	Burkina Faso (BUR)	1	0	0	1
25	Mozambique (MOZ)*	0	4	8	12
26	Republic of the Congo (CGO)	0	3	5	8
27	Madagascar (MAD)	0	2	3	5
28	Zambia (ZAM)	0	1	1	2
29	Tanzania (TAN)	0	1	0	1
30	Democratic Republic of the Congo (COD)	0	0	6	6
31	Lesotho (LES)	0	0	3	3
32	Niger (NIG)	0	0	2	2
32	Swaziland (SWZ)	0	0	2	2
34	Libya (LBA)	0	0	1	1
34	São Tomé and Príncipe (STP)	0	0	1	1
34	Togo (TOG)	0	0	1	1
Totals (36 entries)		249	246	314	809

== Venues and infrastructure ==
When Mozambique initially announced its ability to host the 10th Games, there was a possibility of a paring down of the sports to be offered, due to time constraints and a potential lack of facilities for the Games (e.g. the country has no field hockey field capable of hosting a Games-level competition). However, the Games eventually featured 20 sports, down 4 from the 24 hosted at the 2007 All-Africa Games.

Listed below are the venues that hosted the 2011 All-African Games:

- Universidade Eduardo Mondlane – Handball
- Estádio Nacional do Zimpeto – Athletics
- Escola Josina Machel – Badminton
- Pavilhão do Zimpeto – Basketball
- Pavilhão do Estrela Vermelha – Boxing
- Chidenguele – Canoeing
- Via Pública – Cycling
- Estádio Nacional de Zimpeto, Estádio do Costa do Sol, Estádio do Maxaquene, Estádio da Machava – Football
- Escola Central da Frelimo – Judo
- Universidade Eduardo Mondlane – Karate
- Zimpeto Olympic Pool – Swimming
- IMAP – Netball
- Arena do Costa do Sol – Beach volleyball
- Escola Central da Frelimo – Taekwondo
- Courts do Zimpeto — Tennis
- Centro Mahometano – Table tennis
- Bilene – Triathlon
- Baía de Maputo – Sailing
- Pavilhão do Maxaquene – Volleyball
- Banco de Moçambique Matola – Chess
