= Tunisia at the 2010 African Youth Games =

- IOC code: TUN
- NOC: Tunisian Olympic Committee

in Rabat
- Medals Ranked 1st: Gold 39 Silver 11 Bronze 8 Total 58

African Youth Games appearances
- 2010 - 2014 - 2018

Tunisia, participated at the 2010 African Youth Games held in Rabat, Morocco. The country won 58 medals.

== Medal summary ==
=== Medal table ===
| Sport | Gold | Silver | Bronze | Total |
|---|---|---|---|---|
| Athletics | | | | |
| Basketball | | | | |
| Boxing | | | | |
| Canoeing | | | | |
| Cycling | | | | |
| Fencing | | | | |
| Football | | | | |
| Judo | | | | |
| Rowing | | | | |
| Swimming | | | | |
| Table tennis | | | | |
| Taekwondo | | | | |
| Tennis | | | | |
| Weightlifting | | | | |
| Total | | | | |

== See also ==
- Tunisia at the All-Africa Games
