= African Games sports =

African Games
- Medal tables; Medalists; Ceremonies

Games
- 1965; 1973; 1978; 1987; 1991; 1995; 1999; 2003; 2007; 2011; 2015; 2019; 2023; 2027

Sports
- 3x3 basketball; Arm wrestling; Athletics; Badminton; Baseball; Basketball; Beach volleyball; Boxing; Canoeing; Chess; Cricket; Cycling; Diving; Equestrian; Fencing; Football; Gymnastics; Handball; Field hockey; Judo; Karate; Kick-boxing; Netball; Rowing; Rugby sevens; Sailing; Shooting; Softball; Squash; Swimming; Table tennis; Taekwondo; Tennis; Triathlon; Volleyball; Weightlifting; Wrestling

Organizations
- Charter; AU; ANOCA; AASC; NOCs

This is a list of sports played in the African Games and the major affiliated games organized by the Association of National Olympic Committees of Africa (ANOCA).

== African Games sports ==
The African Games is the major multi-sports competition in Africa. This is a list of sports played in the games.

Sport (Discipline)	Body		65	73	78	87	91	95	99	03	07	11	15	19	23
Sport (Discipline)	World	Africa	65	73	78	87	91	95	99	03	07	11	15	19	23
Diving	World Aquatics	CANA						d							
Swimming	World Aquatics	CANA	6	13	26	15	7	32	33	40	40	45	42	42	42
Water polo	World Aquatics	CANA									c				
Archery	WA	WAA												5	
Athletics	World Athletics	CAA	24	34	37	41	41	43	45	45	46	46	46	46	47
Badminton	BWF	BCA								6	6	6	6	6	5
Baseball	WBSC	ABSA							1	1					
Basketball	FIBA	FIBA Africa	2	2	2	2	2	2	2	2	2	2	2		
3x3 basketball	FIBA	FIBA Africa												2	4
Netball	World Netball	CANA						d	d			1			
Chess	FIDE	ACU								28	14	12		5	6
Boxing	World Boxing	AFBC	10	11	11	12	12	12	12	11	11	10	13	13	25
Slalom canoeing	PW	CAC										3			
Sprint canoeing	PW	CAC										12		18	
Road cycling	UCI	CAC	1	1	1	1	1	1	1	1	2	2	2	6	4
Track cycling	UCI	CAC	1		2	1		2	1			3	4	4	11
Equestrian	FEI	ACES												2	
Cricket	ICC	ACA													2
Fencing	FIE	CAE									12		12	12	
Field hockey	FIH	AfHF				1	1	2	2	2					2
Football	FIFA	CAF	1	1	1	1	1	1	1	2	2	2	2	2	2
Rugby sevens	WR	RA													2
Artistic gymnastics	World Gymnastics	UAG					10	10	11	11	11		12	14	
Aerobic gymnastics	World Gymnastics	UAG											4		
Handball	IHF	CAHB	1	1	2	2	2	2	2	2	2	2	2	2	2
Judo	IJF	AJU	6	6	8	8	16	16	32	16	16	14	14	14	15
Karate	WKF	UFAK					11	11	17	11	13	16	16	16	16
Kickboxing	WAKO	WAKO Afri									12				
Boules	FIPJP	CASB											2		
Rowing	World Rowing	FASA									8			9	
Sailing	World Sailing	ASCON									6	6			
Shooting	ISSF	ASSF					12	x			6			5	
Snooker	IBSF	ABSC												3	
Squash	World Squash	SFA								4					
Table tennis	ITTF	ATTF		7	6	7	7	7	7	7	7	7	7	7	7
Taekwondo	World Taekwondo	UAT				8	8	8	8	16	16	16	16	16	25
Tennis	World Tennis	CAT	2	2	4	4	4	4	2	6	6	6	6	6	6
Triathlon	World Triathlon	ATU										2		3	2
Beach volleyball	FIVB	CAVB										2	2	2	2
Volleyball	FIVB	CAVB	1	1	2	2	2	2	2	2	2	2	2	2	2
Arm wrestling	WAF	AFA													28
Weightlifting	IWF	WFA				10	10	10	15	9	15		45	60	60
Wrestling - Freestyle	UWW	CALA			10	10	10	10	14	14	12		16	12	12
Wrestling - Greco-Roman	UWW	CALA			10	10	10	10	8	7	7		8	6	6
Total events															

x : Not known

== African Youth Games sports ==
This is a list of sports played in the African Youth Games.

Sport (Discipline)	Body		10	14	18
Sport (Discipline)	World	Africa	10	14	18
3x3 basketball	FIBA	FIBA Africa	2	2	2
Swimming	FINA	CANA	x	25	28
Archery	WA	WAA			4
Athletics	IAAF	CAA	13	46	29
Badminton	BWF	BCA		6	5
Boules	FIPJP	CASB			13
Boxing	AIBA	AFBC	x	12	11
Slalom canoeing	ICF	CAC	x	4	2
Sprint canoeing	ICF	CAC	x	4	2
Mountain biking	UCI	CAC	x	2	2
Road cycling	UCI	CAC	x	2	2
Track cycling	UCI	CAC	x	2	3
Equestrian	FEI	ACES			1
Fencing	FIE	AFC	x	3	12
Field hockey	FIH	AfHF			2
Football	FIFA	CAF	1	1	1
Golf	IGF	AGC		2	2
Artistic gymnastics	FIG	AGU			15
Aerobic gymnastics	FIG	AGU			15
Handball	IHF	CAHB			2
Judo	IJF	AJU	x		7
Karate	WKF	UFAK	x	13	8
Netball	INF	CANA	x	1	
Rowing	ISSF	FASA		3	8
Rugby sevens	IRB	CAR		1	2
Sailing	ISAF	ASCON	x		4
Shooting	ISSF	ASSF	x		11
Table tennis	ITTF	CAT	x	3	3
Taekwondo	WTF	AFTU	x	10	7
Tennis	ITF	CAT	x	5	5
Triathlon	ITU	ATU		6	x
Volleyball	FIVB	CAVB	x	1	2
Beach volleyball	FIVB	CAVB			2
Weightlifting	IWF	WFA	x	6	24
Wrestling - Freestyle	UWW	CALA	x		16
Wrestling - Greco-Roman	UWW	CALA	x		8
Total events					

x: Not known

== African Beach Games sports ==
This is a list of sports played in the African Beach Games.

== See also ==
- Olympic sports
- World Games sports
- List of traditional games in Africa
