= All-time African Games medal table =

African Games

Editions
- 1965; 1973; 1978; 1987; 1991; 1995; 1999; 2003; 2007; 2011; 2015; 2019; 2023

Medal tables
- 1965; 1973; 1978; 1987; 1991; 1995; 1999; 2003; 2007; 2011; 2015; 2019; 2023

An all-time medal table for all African Games from 1965 to 2023 is tabulated below.

== All-time medal table ==
50 nations have won at least a single medal in the African Games, from 54 National Olympic Committees participating throughout the history of the Games. 42 nations have won at least one gold medal.

Team (IOC code)	Games	Gold	Silver	Bronze	Total
Algeria (ALG)	13	342	353	448	1143
Angola (ANG)	10	26	22	46	94
Benin (BEN)	12	3	5	10	18
Botswana (BOT)	9	20	20	49	89
Burkina Faso (BUR)	12	6	8	12	26
Burundi (BDI)	8	1	1	1	3
Cameroon (CMR)	13	44	83	151	278
Cape Verde (CPV)	8	1	0	3	4
Central African Republic (CAF)	9	1	3	7	11
Republic of the Congo (CGO)	13	8	15	40	63
Djibouti (DJI)		0	2	2	4
Democratic Republic of the Congo (COD)	13	6	15	34	55
Chad (CHA)	13	1	0	9	10
Ivory Coast (CIV)	13	29	41	74	144
Egypt (EGY)	13	856	598	566	2020
Eritrea (ERI)	5	12	7	9	28
Ethiopia (ETH)	13	54	62	80	196
Gabon (GAB)	13	8	10	32	50
The Gambia (GAM)	12	6	5	3	14
Ghana (GHA)	13	55	83	116	254
Guinea (GUI)	13	2	4	6	12
Guinea-Bissau (GBS)	7	0	1	6	7
Kenya (KEN)	13	142	152	185	479
Lesotho (LES)	9	9	8	18	35
Liberia (LBR)	2	1	2	3	6
Libya (LBA)	13	13	30	38	81
Madagascar (MAD)	13	21	27	54	102
Malawi (MAW)	9	0	1	4	5
Mali (MLI)	13	9	11	22	42
Mauritius (MRI)	10	30	36	62	128
Morocco (MAR)	4	57	68	97	222
Mozambique (MOZ)	10	6	15	13	34
Namibia (NAM)	9	8	19	34	61
Niger (NIG)	13	7	3	16	26
Nigeria (NGR)	13	517	462	468	1447
Rwanda (RWA)	10	2	3	5	10
São Tomé and Príncipe (STP)	6	1	2	3	6
Senegal (SEN)	13	69	78	171	318
Seychelles (SEY)	10	9	28	35	72
Sierra Leone (SLE)	8	1	2	1	4
Somalia (SOM)	11	1	1	0	2
South Africa (RSA)	8	429	394	337	1160
Sudan (SUD)	11	8	2	4	14
Swaziland (SWZ)	10	1	0	11	13
Tanzania (TAN)	11	4	10	10	24
Togo (TOG)	12	0	4	14	18
Tunisia (TUN)	12	260	244	277	781
Uganda (UGA)	12	22	21	44	87
Zambia (ZAM)	12	7	8	33	48
Zimbabwe (ZIM)	12	35	43	71	149
Total		2324	2280	2828	7432

== Ranking (1965-2023) ==
Rank	NOC	Gold	Silver	Bronze	Total
1	Egypt (EGY)	753	551	524	1,828
2	Nigeria (NGR)	517	462	468	1,447
3	South Africa (RSA)	429	394	334	1,157
4	Algeria (ALG)	339	348	441	1,128
5	Tunisia (TUN)	275	271	319	865
6	Kenya (KEN)	143	162	185	490
7	Senegal (SEN)	69	78	171	318
8	Ghana (GHA)	55	83	116	254
9	Ethiopia (ETH)	54	62	80	196
10	Morocco (MAR)	48	55	74	177
11	Cameroon (CMR)	44	83	151	278
12	Zimbabwe (ZIM)	38	47	75	160
13	Ivory Coast (CIV)	29	41	74	144
14	Mauritius (MRI)	29	36	62	127
15	Uganda (UGA)	26	27	54	107
16	Angola (ANG)	25	22	44	91
17	Madagascar (MAD)	21	27	54	102
18	Botswana (BOT)	20	20	49	89
19	Libya (LBA)	13	30	38	81
20	Eritrea (ERI)	12	7	8	27
21	Zambia (ZAM)	11	13	39	63
22	Lesotho (LES)	9	8	18	35
23	Namibia (NAM)	8	19	34	61
24	Republic of the Congo (CGO)	8	16	40	64
25	Mali (MLI)	8	11	22	41
26	Gabon (GAB)	8	10	22	40
27	Sudan (SUD)	8	2	4	14
28	Burkina Faso (BUR)	7	9	19	35
29	Niger (NIG)	7	3	17	27
30	Mozambique (MOZ)	6	15	13	34
31	Democratic Republic of the Congo (COD)	6	14	34	54
32	The Gambia (GAM)	6	5	3	14
33	Tanzania (TAN)	4	10	13	27
34	Benin (BEN)	3	4	10	17
35	Guinea (GUI)	2	4	6	12
36	Rwanda (RWA)	2	3	5	10
37	Central African Republic (CAF)	1	3	7	11
38	Liberia (LBR)	1	2	3	6
38	São Tomé and Príncipe (STP)	1	2	3	6
40	Sierra Leone (SLE)	1	2	1	4
41	Burundi (BDI)	1	1	1	3
42	Somalia (SOM)	1	1	0	2
43	Swaziland (SWZ)	1	0	11	12
44	Chad (CHA)	1	0	9	10
45	Cape Verde (CPV)	1	0	3	4
46	South Sudan (SSD)	1	0	0	1
47	Togo (TOG)	0	5	17	22
48	Djibouti (DJI)	0	2	2	4
49	Guinea-Bissau (GBS)	0	1	6	7
50	Malawi (MAW)	0	1	4	5
51	Equatorial Guinea (GEQ)	0	1	0	1
Totals (51 entries)		3,052	2,973	3,687	9,712

== NOCs without medals ==
- Comoros
- Mauritania

== See also ==
- All-time Asian Games medal table
- All-time European Games medal table
- All-time Pan American Games medal table
