= Athletics at the African Games =

African Games event

- Athletics
- Frequency: Every four years
- Inaugurated: 1965 (Republic of the Congo) Brazzaville
- Most recent: 2023 (Ghana) Accra
- Best: Nigeria (NGR)

Athletics is an African Games event ever since the inaugural edition in Brazzaville, Congo, at the 1965 All-Africa Games, and has continued to feature prominently at the competition in each of its subsequent editions.

== Editions ==
Games	Year	Host	Events			Best nation
Games	Year	Host	Men	Women	Mixed	Best nation
I	1965	Brazzaville	18	6	—N/a	Nigeria
II	1973	Lagos	21	13	—N/a	Kenya
III	1978	Algiers	23	14	—N/a	Nigeria
IV	1987	Nairobi	23	18	—N/a	Nigeria
V	1991	Cairo	23	18	—N/a	Nigeria
VI	1995	Harare	23	20	—N/a	Nigeria
VII	1999	Johannesburg	23	22	—N/a	Nigeria
VIII	2003	Abuja	23	22	—N/a	Nigeria
IX	2007	Algiers	23	23	—N/a	Nigeria
X	2011	Maputo	23	23	—N/a	Nigeria
XI	2015	Brazzaville	23	23	—N/a	Nigeria
XII	2019	Rabat	23	23	—N/a	Kenya
XIII	2023	Accra	23	23	1	Nigeria

== Events ==
=== Men's events ===
Event	65	73	78	87	91	95	99	03	07	11	Years
Current program
100 metres	•	•	•	•	•	•	•	•	•	•	10
200 metres	•	•	•	•	•	•	•	•	•	•	10
400 metres	•	•	•	•	•	•	•	•	•	•	10
800 metres	•	•	•	•	•	•	•	•	•	•	10
1500 metres	•	•	•	•	•	•	•	•	•	•	10
5000 metres	•	•	•	•	•	•	•	•	•	•	10
10,000 metres		•	•	•	•	•	•	•	•	•	9
Marathon		•	•	•	•	•	•	•			7
Half marathon									•	•	2
110 metres hurdles	•	•	•	•	•	•	•	•	•	•	10
400 metres hurdles	•	•	•	•	•	•	•	•	•	•	10
3000 metres steeplechase	•	•	•	•	•	•	•	•	•	•	10
4 × 100 metres relay	•	•	•	•	•	•	•	•	•	•	10
4 × 400 metres relay	•	•	•	•	•	•	•	•	•	•	10
20 km walk			•	•	•	•	•	•	•	•	8
Long jump	•	•	•	•	•	•	•	•	•	•	10
Triple jump	•	•	•	•	•	•	•	•	•	•	10
High jump	•	•	•	•	•	•	•	•	•	•	10
Pole vault	•	•	•	•	•	•	•	•	•	•	10
Shot put	•	•	•	•	•	•	•	•	•	•	10
Discus throw	•	•	•	•	•	•	•	•	•	•	10
Hammer throw		•	•	•	•	•	•	•	•	•	9
Javelin throw	•	•	•	•	•	•	•	•	•	•	10
Decathlon			•	•	•	•	•	•	•	•	8
Events	18	21	23	23	23	23	23	23	23	23	

=== Women's events ===
Event	65	73	78	87	91	95	99	03	07	11	Years
Current program
100 metres	•	•	•	•	•	•	•	•	•	•	10
200 metres		•	•	•	•	•	•	•	•	•	9
400 metres		•	•	•	•	•	•	•	•	•	9
800 metres		•	•	•	•	•	•	•	•	•	9
1500 metres		•	•	•	•	•	•	•	•	•	9
5000 metres						•	•	•	•	•	5
10,000 metres				•	•	•	•	•	•	•	7
Marathon						•	•	•			3
Half marathon									•	•	2
80 metres hurdles	•										1
100 metres hurdles		•	•	•	•	•	•	•	•	•	9
400 metres hurdles		•		•	•	•	•	•	•	•	8
3000 metres steeplechase					•				•	•	3
4 × 100 metres relay	•	•	•	•	•	•	•	•	•	•	10
4 × 400 metres relay		•	•	•	•	•	•	•	•	•	9
20 km walk							•	•	•	•	4
5000 metre track walk				•	•	•					3
Long jump	•	•	•	•	•	•	•	•	•	•	10
Triple jump						•	•	•	•	•	5
High jump	•	•	•	•	•	•	•	•	•	•	10
Pole vault							•	•	•	•	4
Shot put			•	•	•	•	•	•	•	•	8
Discus throw		•	•	•	•	•	•	•	•	•	9
Hammer throw							•	•	•	•	4
Javelin throw	•	•	•	•	•	•	•	•	•	•	10
Pentathlon			•								1
Heptathlon				•	•	•	•	•	•	•	7
Events	6	13	14	18	18	20	22	22	23	23	

== Medal table ==
- Last updated after the 2023 edition. Excluding Para-Athletics.

Rank	Nation	Gold	Silver	Bronze	Total
1	Nigeria (NGR)	138	118	73	329
2	Kenya (KEN)	90	97	85	272
3	Ethiopia (ETH)	49	50	55	154
4	South Africa (RSA)	48	52	54	154
5	Algeria (ALG)	29	37	38	104
6	Ghana (GHA)	28	35	31	94
7	Egypt (EGY)	24	24	21	69
8	Tunisia (TUN)	20	18	11	49
9	Senegal (SEN)	15	17	21	53
10	Ivory Coast (CIV)	15	9	20	44
11	Botswana (BOT)	14	7	7	28
12	Uganda (UGA)	12	12	21	45
13	Cameroon (CMR)	8	9	12	29
14	Sudan (SUD)	7	3	1	11
15	Burkina Faso (BUR)	5	5	7	17
16	Mauritius (MRI)	4	3	6	13
17	Mozambique (MOZ)	4	2	0	6
18	Tanzania (TAN)	3	4	6	13
19	Mali (MLI)	3	3	2	8
20	The Gambia (GAM)	3	2	0	5
20	Zambia (ZAM)	3	2	0	5
22	Eritrea (ERI)	3	1	2	6
23	Madagascar (MAD)	2	4	7	13
24	Namibia (NAM)	2	3	11	16
25	Morocco (MAR)	1	8	5	14
26	Zimbabwe (ZIM)	1	4	10	15
27	Seychelles (SEY)	1	4	4	9
28	Liberia (LBR)	1	2	2	5
29	Sierra Leone (SLE)	1	2	0	3
30	Republic of the Congo (CGO)	1	1	7	9
31	Benin (BEN)	1	1	4	6
32	Burundi (BDI)	1	1	3	5
33	Somalia (SOM)	1	1	0	2
34	Chad (CHA)	1	0	4	5
35	Swaziland (SWZ)	1	0	1	2
36	South Sudan (SSD)	1	0	0	1
37	Togo (TOG)	0	2	4	6
38	Guinea (GUI)	0	1	1	2
38	Lesotho (LES)	0	1	1	2
40	Djibouti (DJI)	0	1	0	1
40	Rwanda (RWA)	0	1	0	1
42	Central African Republic (CAF)	0	0	1	1
Totals (42 entries)		541	547	538	1,626

== See also ==
- International athletics championships and games
