= Boxing at the African Games =

Boxing competitions

- Boxing
- Frequency: Every four years
- Inaugurated: 1965 (Republic of the Congo) Brazzaville
- Most recent: 2023 (Ghana) Accra
- Best: Algeria (ALG)

Boxing was an African Games event at its inaugural edition in 1965 and has continued to feature prominently at the competition in each of its subsequent editions.

== Editions ==
Games	Year	Host city	Events		Best nation
Games	Year	Host city	Men	Women	Best nation
I	1965	(Republic of the Congo) Brazzaville	10	—N/a	Egypt
II	1973	(Nigeria) Lagos	11	—N/a	Nigeria
III	1978	(Algeria) Algiers	11	—N/a	Kenya
IV	1987	(Kenya) Nairobi	12	—N/a	Kenya
V	1991	(Egypt) Cairo	12	—N/a	Kenya
VI	1995	(Zimbabwe) Harare	12	—N/a	Tunisia
VII	1999	(South Africa) Johannesburg	12	—N/a	Algeria
VIII	2003	(Nigeria) Abuja	11	—N/a	Nigeria
IX	2007	(Algeria) Algiers	11	—N/a	Algeria
X	2011	(Mozambique) Maputo	10	—N/a	Algeria
XI	2015	(Republic of the Congo) Brazzaville	10	3	Algeria
XII	2019	(Morocco) Rabat	8	5	Morocco
XIII	2023	(Ghana) Accra	13	12	Nigeria

== Medal table ==
As of 2023:

Rank	Nation	Gold	Silver	Bronze	Total
1	Algeria (ALG)	27	20	21	68
2	Nigeria (NGR)	27	20	14	61
3	Kenya (KEN)	19	11	16	46
4	Egypt (EGY)	18	12	16	46
5	Tunisia (TUN)	12	10	14	36
6	Ghana (GHA)	8	11	12	31
7	Uganda (UGA)	8	9	11	28
8	Zambia (ZAM)	7	4	9	20
9	Morocco (MAR)	6	5	6	17
10	Mauritius (MRI)	6	3	4	13
11	(Democratic Republic of the Congo) DR Congo (COD)	3	10	10	23
12	Ethiopia (ETH)	3	4	7	14
13	Botswana (BOT)	3	2	4	9
14	Cameroon (CMR)	3	1	15	19
15	Tanzania (TAN)	2	6	7	15
16	South Africa (RSA)	2	4	10	16
17	Guinea (GUI)	2	0	1	3
18	Namibia (NAM)	1	4	3	8
19	Madagascar (MAD)	1	2	2	5
20	Republic of the Congo (CGO)	1	1	1	3
21	Sudan (SUD)	1	1	0	2
22	Senegal (SEN)	1	0	3	4
23	Mozambique (MOZ)	0	5	3	8
24	Niger (NIG)	0	2	0	2
24	Togo (TOG)	0	2	0	2
26	Zimbabwe (ZIM)	0	1	1	2
27	Burkina Faso (BUR)	0	1	0	1
27	Equatorial Guinea (GEQ)	0	1	0	1
27	Mali (MLI)	0	1	0	1
27	Seychelles (SEY)	0	1	0	1
31	Gabon (GAB)	0	0	7	7
32	Lesotho (LES)	0	0	4	4
33	Angola (ANG)	0	0	2	2
33	Benin (BEN)	0	0	2	2
33	Central African Republic (CAF)	0	0	2	2
33	Libya (LBA)	0	0	2	2
37	Burundi (BDI)	0	0	1	1
37	Cape Verde (CPV)	0	0	1	1
37	Liberia (LBR)	0	0	1	1
Totals (39 entries)		161	154	212	527
