= Taekwondo at the African Games =

Taekwondo competition

- Taekwondo
- Frequency: Every four years
- Inaugurated: 1987 (Kenya) Nairobi
- Most recent: 2019 (Morocco) Rabat
- Next event: 2023 (Ghana) Accra
- Best: Egypt (EGY)

Taekwondo was an African Games event at its inaugural edition in 1987 and has continued to feature at the competition in each of its subsequent editions.

== Editions ==
Games	Year	Host city	Events			Best nation
Games	Year	Host city	Men	Women	Mixed	Best nation
IV	1987	(Kenya) Nairobi	8	—N/a	—N/a	Nigeria
V	1991	(Egypt) Cairo	8	—N/a	—N/a	Egypt
VI	1995	(Zimbabwe) Harare			—N/a	
VII	1999	(South Africa) Johannesburg	8	8	—N/a	Lesotho
VIII	2003	(Nigeria) Abuja	8	8	—N/a	Egypt
IX	2007	(Algeria) Algiers	8	8	—N/a	Egypt
X	2011	(Mozambique) Maputo	8	8	—N/a	Egypt
XI	2015	(Republic of the Congo) Brazzaville	8	8	—N/a	Egypt
XII	2019	(Morocco) Rabat	8	8	—N/a	Morocco
XIII	2023	(Ghana) Accra	12	12	1	Tunisia

== Medal table ==
- Last updated after the 2023 edition:

Rank	Nation	Gold	Silver	Bronze	Total
1	Egypt (EGY)	28	23	11	62
2	Tunisia (TUN)	16	9	10	35
3	Nigeria (NGR)	9	8	23	40
4	Morocco (MAR)	8	3	9	20
5	Ethiopia (ETH)	7	3	7	17
6	Niger (NIG)	7	1	6	14
7	Ivory Coast (CIV)	6	13	28	47
8	Senegal (SEN)	5	8	10	23
9	Mali (MLI)	3	2	13	18
10	Lesotho (LES)	2	6	5	13
11	Ghana (GHA)	2	6	4	12
12	Gabon (GAB)	2	3	7	12
13	Algeria (ALG)	2	3	2	7
14	(Democratic Republic of the Congo) DR Congo (COD)	1	4	9	14
15	Kenya (KEN)	1	3	18	22
16	Swaziland (SWZ)	1	2	4	7
17	Chad (CHA)	1	0	2	3
18	Mauritius (MRI)	1	0	0	1
19	Libya (LBA)	0	1	3	4
20	Botswana (BOT)	0	0	5	5
21	Burkina Faso (BUR)	0	0	3	3
21	Cameroon (CMR)	0	0	3	3
23	Angola (ANG)	0	0	1	1
23	Guinea (GUI)	0	0	1	1
23	Mozambique (MOZ)	0	0	1	1
23	South Africa (RSA)	0	0	1	1
Totals (26 entries)		102	98	186	386
