= Cycling at the African Games =

- Cycling
- Frequency: Every four years
- Inaugurated: 1965 (Republic of the Congo) Brazzaville
- Most recent: 2011 (Mozambique) Maputo
- Next event: 2015 (Republic of the Congo) Brazzaville
- Most successful: South Africa (RSA)

A cycling competition is held as part of the African Games.

== Editions ==
Games	Year	Host city	Host country
I	1965	Brazzaville	Republic of the Congo
II	1973	Lagos	Nigeria
III	1978	Algiers	Algeria
IV	1987	Nairobi	Kenya
V	1991	Cairo	Egypt
VI	1995	Harare	Zimbabwe
VII	1999	Johannesburg	South Africa
VIII	2003	Abuja	Nigeria
IX	2007	Algiers	Algeria
X	2011	Maputo	Mozambique
XI	2015	Brazzaville	Republic of the Congo
XII	2019	Rabat	Morocco
XIII	2023	Accra	Ghana

== Medal table ==
Rank	Nation	Gold	Silver	Bronze	Total
1	South Africa (RSA)	13	8	6	27
2	Algeria (ALG)	5	6	7	18
3	Eritrea (ERI)	2	2	0	4
4	Mauritius (MRI)	1	2	1	4
5	Egypt (EGY)	1	1	1	3
6	Nigeria (NGR)	1	1	0	2
7	Ethiopia (ETH)	1	0	1	2
7	Rwanda (RWA)	1	0	1	2
9	Namibia (NAM)	0	1	0	1
10	Zimbabwe (ZIM)	0	0	2	2
11	Kenya (KEN)	0	0	1	1
11	Seychelles (SEY)	0	0	1	1
11	Tunisia (TUN)	0	0	1	1
Totals (13 entries)		25	21	22	68

NTB : The table is not complete.
