= Triathlon at the African Games =

- Triathlon
- Frequency: Every four years
- Inaugurated: 2011 (Mozambique) Maputo
- Most recent: 2023 (Ghana) Accra
- Best: South Africa (RSA)

Triathlon has been an event at the African Games since 2011 in Maputo, Mozambique.

== Editions ==
Games	Year	Host city	Events			Top Country
Games	Year	Host city	Men	Women	Mixed	Top Country
X	2011	(Mozambique) Maputo	1	1	—N/a	South Africa
XI	2015	Not held				
XII	2019	(Morocco) Rabat	1	1	1	Morocco
XIII	2023	(Ghana) Accra	1	1	—N/a	South Africa

== Events ==
Event	11	19	23	Years
Men's individual	•	•	•	3
Women's individual	•	•	•	3
Mixed Relay		•		1
Total	2	3	2	

== Medal table ==
As of 2023:

Rank	Nation	Gold	Silver	Bronze	Total
1	South Africa (RSA)	4	2	2	8
2	Morocco (MAR)	1	2	0	3
3	Egypt (EGY)	1	0	1	2
4	Tunisia (TUN)	1	0	0	1
5	Algeria (ALG)	0	1	2	3
6	Zimbabwe (ZIM)	0	1	1	2
7	Namibia (NAM)	0	1	0	1
8	Mauritius (MRI)	0	0	1	1
Totals (8 entries)		7	7	7	21

== Participating nations ==
Nation	11	19	23	Years
Algeria (ALG)		•	•	2
Egypt (EGY)	•	•	•	3
Ghana (GHA)			•	1
Kenya (KEN)	•		•	2
Mauritius (MRI)	•	•	•	3
Morocco (MAR)		•	•	2
Mozambique (MOZ)	•			1
Namibia (NAM)	•			1
Nigeria (NGR)	•		•	2
Rwanda (RWA)			•	1
Senegal (SEN)		•	•	2
Sierra Leone (SLE)			•	1
South Africa (RSA)	•		•	2
Tunisia (TUN)		•	•	2
Uganda (UGA)	•			1
Zimbabwe (ZIM)	•	•	•	3
Total	9	7	13	
