= Gymnastics at the African Games =

- Gymnastics
- Frequency: Every four years
- Inaugurated: 1965 (Republic of the Congo) Brazzaville
- Most recent: 2019 (Morocco) Rabat
- Best: Egypt (EGY)

Gymnastics events have been contested at most African Games since the 1991 All-Africa Games in Cairo. It was absent at the 2011 and 2023 Games.

== Editions ==
Games	Year	Host city	Events		Best nation	
Games	Year	Host city	Men	Women	Artistic gymnastics	Rhythmic gymnastics
V	1991	(Egypt) Cairo	8	6	Egypt (EGY)	—N/a
VI	1995	(Zimbabwe) Harare	8	6	South Africa (RSA)	Egypt (EGY)
VII	1999	(South Africa) Johannesburg	8	6	South Africa (RSA)	Egypt (EGY)
VIII	2003	(Nigeria) Abuja	8	6	South Africa (RSA)	—N/a
IX	2007	(Algeria) Algiers	8	6	Egypt (EGY)	—N/a
X	2011	(Mozambique) Maputo	Not held			
XI	2015	(Republic of the Congo) Brazzaville	9	7	Algeria (ALG)	—N/a
XII	2019	(Morocco) Rabat	8	6	Egypt (EGY)	—N/a
XIII	2023	(Ghana) Accra	Not held			
XVI	2027	(Egypt) Cairo	To be determined			

== Medal table ==
As of 2019:

Rank	Nation	Gold	Silver	Bronze	Total
1	Egypt (EGY)	44	42	23	109
2	Algeria (ALG)	26	18	23	67
3	South Africa (RSA)	22	21	25	68
4	Tunisia (TUN)	3	4	7	14
5	Nigeria (NGR)	2	0	6	8
6	Zimbabwe (ZIM)	1	0	2	3
7	Republic of the Congo (CGO)	1	0	1	2
8	Namibia (NAM)	0	0	5	5
9	Morocco (MAR)	0	0	2	2
10	Cape Verde (CPV)	0	0	1	1
Totals (10 entries)		99	85	95	279

== Events ==
=== Artistic ===
Event	91	95	99	03	07	11	15	19	23	Years
Men's team	X	X	X	X	X		X	X		7
Men's individual all-around	X	X	X	X	X		X	X		7
Men's floor exercise	X	X	X	X	X			X		6
Men's pommel horse	X	X	X	X	X		X	X		7
Men's still rings	X	X	X	X	X		X	X		7
Men's vault	X	X	X	X	X		X	X		7
Men's parallel bars	X	X	X	X	X		X	X		7
Men's horizontal bar	X	X	X	X	X		X	X		7
Women's team	X	X	X	X	X		X	X		7
Women's individual all-around	X	X	X	X	X		X	X		7
Women's vault	X	X	X	X	X		X	X		7
Women's uneven bars	X	X	X	X	X		X	X		7
Women's balance beam	X	X	X	X	X		X	X		7
Women's floor exercise	X	X	X	X	X			X		6
Total	14	14	14	14	14	0	12	14	0	

=== Rhythmic ===
Event	95	99	Years
Team	X	X	2
Individual all-around	X	X	2
Ball	X	X	2
Clubs	X	X	2
Hoop	X	X	2
Ribbon	X	X	2
Rope	X	X	2
Total	7	7	

== Medal table ==
Last updated after the 2019 African Games

== See also ==
- African Artistic Gymnastics Championships
- African Rhythmic Gymnastics Championships
