= Algeria at the African Games =

- IOC code: ALG
- NOC: Algerian Olympic Committee
- Website: COA.dz
- Medals Ranked 4th: Gold 339 Silver 348 Bronze 441 Total 1,128

African Games appearances (overview)
- 1965; 1973; 1978; 1987; 1991; 1995; 1999; 2003; 2007; 2011; 2015; 2019; 2023; 2027

Youth appearances
- 2010; 2014; 2018; 2022

Algeria has competed at every edition of the African Games. Its athletes have won a total of 1128 medals.

== Medal tables ==
=== Medals by Games ===
Host nation

Below is a table representing all Algerian medals around the Games. Till now, Algeria has won a total of 1128 medals, including 342 gold medals.

Games	Gold	Silver	Bronze	Total	Rank	Notes
1965 Brazzaville	2	3	6	11	7	details
1973 Lagos	4	5	13	22	7	details
1978 Algiers	16	19	23	58	3	details
1987 Nairobi	13	23	23	59	5	details
1991 Cairo	49	36	34	119	2	details
1995 Harare	15	16	26	57	4	details
1999 Johannesburg	14	24	32	70	5	details
2003 Abuja	32	24	31	87	4	details
2007 Algiers	70	58	77	205	2	details
2011 Maputo	22	29	33	84	5	details
2015 Brazzaville	40	41	36	117	4	details
2019 Rabat	33	32	60	125	4	details
2023 Accra	29	38	47	114	4	details
Total	339	348	441	1128	4	details

=== Medals by sport ===
Sport	Gold	Silver	Bronze	Total
Judo	53	24	38	115
Gymnastics	29	29	22	80
Swimming	27	50	60	137
Karate	23	22	26	71
Athletics	22	31	32	85
Boxing	21	18	13	52
Weightlifting	15	24	26	65
Wrestling	13	29	28	70
Chess	13	11	7	31
Cycling	7	8	9	24
Kickboxing	7	4	1	12
Tennis	5	4	2	11
Handball	5	3	1	9
Volleyball	5	2	2	9
Equestrian	4	2	0	6
Taekwondo	3	2	6	11
Rowing	3	1	2	6
Sailing	1	4	5	10
Canoeing	1	2	0	3
Badminton	1	0	2	3
Football	1	0	1	2
Shooting	0	1	2	3
Table tennis	0	0	8	8
Totals (23 entries)	259	271	293	823

== Athletes with most medals ==
Athlete	Sport	Games	Gold medal	Silver medal	Bronze medal	Total
Amina Mezioud	Chess	2003–2007–2011	5	2	0	7
Salim Iles	Swimming	1995–1999–2003–2007	5	1	1	7
Majda Chebaraka	Swimming	2015	2	1	3	6
Sofiane Daid	Swimming	2003–2007–2011	1	4	1	6
Nabil Kebbab	Swimming	2007–2011	1	3	2	6
Sabrina Latreche	Chess	2007–2011	2	2	1	5
Farah Boufadene	Gymnastics	2015	2	0	3	5
Lamine Ouahab	Tennis	2007	3	0	0	3
Farida Arouche	Chess	2003	2	1	0	3
Abderrahmane Benamadi	Judo	2007–2011–2015	2	1	0	3
Abdelhafid Benchabla	Boxing	2007–2011–2015	2	1	0	3
Mohamed Bouaichaoui	Judo	1999–2007	2	1	0	3
Mohamed Bourguieg	Gymnastics	2015	2	1	0	3
Mohamed Haddouche	Chess	2003–2007	2	1	0	3
Siham Mansouri	Gymnastics	2015	2	1	0	3
Hakim Toumi	Athletics	1987–1991–1995–1999	2	1	0	3
Mohamed Aouicha	Gymnastics	2015	2	0	1	3
Asma Houli	Chess	2003	2	0	1	3
Amira Hamza	Chess	2007–2011	1	2	0	3
Rania Hamida Nefsi	Swimming	2015	1	0	2	3
Taoufik Makhloufi	Athletics	2011–2015	1	1	1	3
Adlane Arab	Chess	2003–2019	0	3	0	3
Messaoud Seddam	Weightlifting	2015	0	3	0	3
Adil Barbari	Cycling	2015	0	1	2	3
Souad Cherouati	Swimming	2015	0	1	2	3

Note: The athletes highlighted in khaki are still active.

== African Games football tournaments ==
African Games record
Year	Round	Position	M	W	D	L	GF	GA
(Republic of the Congo) 1965	Fourth place	4th	5	2	0	3	6	5
(Nigeria) 1973	Group stage	5th	3	1	1	1	6	6
(Algeria) 1978	Gold	1st	5	4	1	0	9	2
(Kenya) 1987	Disqualified ^{1}							
(Egypt) 1991	Did not qualify							
(Zimbabwe) 1995	Group stage	6th	3	1	0	2	2	4
(South Africa) 1999	Group stage	6th	3	1	0	2	2	4
(Nigeria) 2003	Group stage	5th	3	1	1	1	3	4
(Algeria) 2007	Group stage	5th	3	1	1	1	4	4
(Mozambique) 2011	Did not qualify							
(Republic of the Congo) 2015	Did not enter							
(Morocco) 2019	Did not qualify							
(Ghana) 2023	Did not qualify							
(Egypt) 2027	To be determined							
Total	Gold Medal	7/11	25	11	4	10	32	29

- Prior to the Cairo 1991 campaign, the Football at the African Games was open to full senior national teams.
- ^1 Algeria withdrew in protest at CAF's decision to order a replay of the first leg against Tunisia; CAF had made this decision following Tunisia's protest that Algeria had fielded two ineligible players.

== See also ==
- Algeria at the Islamic Solidarity Games
- Algeria at the Mediterranean Games
- Algeria at the Olympics
- Algeria at the Arab Games
- Algeria at the Paralympics
- Sports in Algeria
