= Chess at the African Games =

- Frequency: Every four years
- Inaugurated: 2003 (Nigeria) Abuja
- Most recent: 2023 (Ghana) Accra
- Most successful: Egypt (EGY)

Chess has been contested at the African Games since the 2003 Games in Abuja, except for the 2015 Games in Brazzaville. The chess events have included individual and team events for men and women.

The open team event at the African Games is the successor of the African Team Chess Championship: the winner of the event gains the right to participate at the next World Team Chess Championship. The African Team Chess Championship was only held twice in Cairo in 1993 and 1997, and Egypt won both times.

== Editions ==
Games	Year	Host city	Events			Best nation
Games	Year	Host city	Men	Women	Mixed	Best nation
VIII	2003	(Nigeria) Abuja	8	8	—N/a	Algeria
IX	2007	(Algeria) Algiers	8	8	—N/a	Egypt
X	2011	(Mozambique) Maputo	7	7	—N/a	Egypt
XI	2015	Not held				
XII	2019	(Morocco) Rabat	2	2	1	Egypt
XIII	2023	(Ghana) Accra	2	2	2	Egypt

== Medal table ==
Rank	Nation	Gold	Silver	Bronze	Total
1	Egypt (EGY)	23	11	6	40
2	Algeria (ALG)	13	11	7	31
3	Nigeria (NGR)	8	3	8	19
4	South Africa (RSA)	2	16	9	27
5	Angola (ANG)	2	2	5	9
6	Libya (LBA)	2	0	1	3
7	Zimbabwe (ZIM)	1	1	1	3
8	Zambia (ZAM)	0	4	5	9
9	Botswana (BOT)	0	2	4	6
10	Ethiopia (ETH)	0	0	1	1
10	Mozambique (MOZ)	0	0	1	1
10	Uganda (UGA)	0	0	1	1
Totals (12 entries)		51	50	49	150
