= Morocco at the African Games =

- IOC code: MAR
- NOC: Moroccan National Olympic Committee
- Website: cnom.org.ma
- Medals Ranked 10thth: Gold 48 Silver 55 Bronze 74 Total 177

African Games appearances (overview)
- 1973; 1978; 1987–2015; 2019; 2023; 2027

Youth appearances
- 2010

Morocco (MAR) has competed in every edition of the African Games since their inauguration in 1965. The country hosted the 2019 African Games in Rabat, and has won a total of 186 medals.

In the 2023 African Para Games, Morocco was the top country on the medal table with a total of 7 medals.

== Medal tables ==
=== Medals by Games ===
Host nation

Below is a table representing all Moroccan medals around the Games.

Games	Athletes	Gold	Silver	Bronze	Total	Rank
(Republic of the Congo) 1965 Brazzaville	Did Not Enter					
(Nigeria) 1973 Lagos	Unknown	1	3	3	7	11
(Algeria) 1978 Algiers	Unknown	7	8	11	26	5
(Kenya) 1987 Nairobi	Banned					
(Egypt) 1991 Cairo	Banned					
(Zimbabwe) 1995 Harare	Banned					
(South Africa) 1999 Johannesburg	Banned					
(Nigeria) 2003 Abuja	Banned					
(Algeria) 2007 Algiers	Banned					
(Mozambique) 2011 Maputo	Banned					
(Republic of the Congo) 2015 Brazzaville	Banned					
(Morocco) 2019 Rabat	179	31	32	46	109	5
(Ghana) 2023 Accra	136	9	12	14	35	7
(Egypt) 2027 Cairo	Future event					
(Uganda) 2031 Kampala	Future event					
Total	4/13	48	55	74	177	10

== See also ==
- Morocco at the Olympics
- Morocco at the Paralympics
- Morocco at the Mediterranean Games
- Morocco at the Youth Olympics
- Sports in Morocco
