= Chad at the African Games =

- IOC code: CHA
- NOC: Chadian Olympic and Sports Committee
- Medals: Gold 1 Silver 0 Bronze 10 Total 11

African Games appearances (overview)
- 1965; 1973; 1978; 1987; 1991–2007; 2011; 2015; 2019; 2023

Chad participated in every edition of the African Games since the competition was established in 1965 and has a total of eleven medals as of the 2019 games.

== Medal Record ==
Games	Gold	Silver	Bronze	Total
1965	0	0	3	3
1973	0	0	0	0
1978	1	0	0	1
1987	0	0	1	1
1991	0	0	0	0
1995	0	0	0	0
1999	0	0	0	0
2003	0	0	0	0
2007	0	0	0	0
2011	0	0	0	0
2015	0	0	2	2
2019	0	0	4	4
Totals (12 entries)	1	0	10	11
