= Rowing at the African Games =

- Rowing
- Frequency: Every four years
- Inaugurated: 2007 (Algeria) Algiers
- Most recent: 2019 (Morocco) Rabat
- Best: Algeria (ALG)

Rowing was an African Games event at its inaugural edition in 2007 in Algiers, Algeria. The second African Games rowing regatta took place at the 2019 African Games in Rabat, Morocco.

== Editions ==
| Games | Year | Host city | Events | | | Top country |
| Games | Year | Host city | Men | Women | Mixed | Top country |
|---|---|---|---|---|---|---|
| IX | 2007 | (Algeria) Algiers | 4 | 4 | —N/a | Algeria |
| X | 2011 | (Mozambique) Maputo | Not held | | | |
| XI | 2015 | (Republic of the Congo) Brazzaville | Not held | | | |
| XII | 2019 | (Morocco) Rabat | 4 | 4 | 1 | Algeria |
| XIII | 2023 | (Ghana) Accra | Not held | | | |

== Medal table ==
As of 2019:

| Rank | Nation | Gold | Silver | Bronze | Total |
|---|---|---|---|---|---|
| 1 | Algeria (ALG) | 8 | 2 | 5 | 15 |
| 2 | Tunisia (TUN) | 4 | 4 | 2 | 10 |
| 3 | Egypt (EGY) | 3 | 6 | 8 | 17 |
| 4 | South Africa (RSA) | 2 | 5 | 0 | 7 |
| 5 | Morocco (MAR) | 0 | 0 | 1 | 1 |
| 5 | Zimbabwe (ZIM) | 0 | 0 | 1 | 1 |
| Totals (6 entries) | | 17 | 17 | 17 | 51 |
