= Squash at the African Games =

- Squash
- Inaugurated: 2003 (Nigeria) Abuja
- Most recent: 2003 (Nigeria) Abuja
- Best: Egypt (EGY)

Squash has been part of the African Games since 2003 in Abuja, Nigeria.

== Editions ==
Games	Year	Host city	Event		Best nation
Games	Year	Host city	Men	Women	Best nation
VIII	2003	(Nigeria) Abuja	2	2	Egypt

== Medal table ==
Rank	Nation	Gold	Silver	Bronze	Total
1	Egypt (EGY)	4	2	2	8
2	South Africa (RSA)	0	2	2	4
3	Nigeria (NGR)	0	0	2	2
4	Zambia (ZAM)	0	0	1	1
Totals (4 entries)		4	4	7	15

== Previous winners ==
Year	Men's Singles	Women's Singles	Men's Team	Women's team
2003; Details	(Egypt) Karim Darwish	(Egypt) Omneya Abdel Kawy	Egypt	Egypt

== See also ==
- Squash Federation of Africa
