= Cricket at the African Games =

- Current season, competition or edition: Cricket at the 2023 African Games
- Sport: Cricket
- Founded: M: 2023; W: 2023
- First season: 2023
- No. of teams: M: 8 W: 8
- Most recent champions: M: Zimbabwe (1st title); W: Zimbabwe (1st title)
- Most titles: M: Zimbabwe (1 title); W: Zimbabwe (1 title)

The team sport of Cricket became a medal sport at the 2023 African Games. Cricket was also confirmed to be included in 2027 African Games at Cairo.

== Summary ==
=== Men ===
Year	Host	Final			Third place match		
Year	Host	Winner	Result	Runner-up	3rd place	Score	4th place
2023	(Ghana); Accra	Zimbabwe Emerging	Zimbabwe Emerging won by 8 wickets Scorecard	Namibia	Uganda	Uganda won by 106 runs Scorecard	Kenya
2027	(Egypt); Cairo						

=== Women ===
Year	Host	Final			Third place match		
Year	Host	Winner	Score	Runner-up	3rd place	Score	4th place
2023	(Ghana); Accra	Zimbabwe	Match Tied (Zimbabwe won the Super Over); Scorecard	South Africa Emerging	Nigeria	Nigeria won by 3 wickets Scorecard	Uganda
2027	(Egypt); Cairo						

== Medal table ==
Rank	Nation	Gold	Silver	Bronze	Total
1	Zimbabwe (ZIM)	2	0	0	2
2	Namibia (NAM)	0	1	0	1
2	South Africa (RSA)	0	1	0	1
4	Nigeria (NGR)	0	0	1	1
4	Uganda (UGA)	0	0	1	1
Totals (5 entries)		2	2	2	6

== Participating nations ==
Legend

- GS — Group Stage

=== Men ===
Team	(Ghana) 2023	Years
Ghana	GS	1
Kenya	4th	1
Namibia	2nd	1
Nigeria	GS	1
South Africa	GS	1
Tanzania	GS	1
Uganda	3rd	1
Zimbabwe	1st	1
Total	8	

=== Women ===
Team	(Ghana) 2023	Years
Kenya	GS	1
Namibia	GS	1
Nigeria	3rd	1
Rwanda	GS	1
South Africa	2nd	1
Tanzania	GS	1
Uganda	4th	1
Zimbabwe	1st	1
Total	8	
