= Basketball at the 2014 African Youth Games =

- Start date: 24 May
- End date: 30 May
- Venue: Botswana National Youth Centre (BNYC)
- Events: Basketball

2014 African Youth Games in Gaborone was held between 28 and 31 May at the Botswana National Stadium. The competition served as the qualification for the 2014 Summer Youth Olympics which took place in August in Nanjing, China.

== Format ==
The boys' and girls' tournament will adopt a round robin group stage and a single-elimination medal round, where the 10 participating teams are split into 2 pools of 10. Each team will play once against the other teams in its pool, and the top 8 teams from each pool will qualify for the knock-out stages.

=== Boys ===
Pool A	Pool B
Botswana	Angola
Kenya	Uganda
Morocco	South Sudan
Tunisia	Egypt
Democratic Republic of the Congo	Algeria

=== Girls ===
Note: Guam entered a girls' basketball team into Group B of the competition; there was no Guam boys' team at the tournament

Pool A	Pool B
Angola	Nigeria
Botswana	Mali
Zimbabwe	Rwanda
Mauritius	Algeria
Egypt	Mozambique

== Medal summary ==
=== Medal table ===
* Host nation (Botswana)

Rank	Nation	Gold	Silver	Bronze	Total
1	Egypt (EGY)	1	1	0	2
2	Angola (ANG)	1	0	0	1
3	Mali (MLI)	0	1	0	1
4	Algeria (ALG)	0	0	1	1
4	DR Congo (COD)	0	0	1	1
Totals (5 entries)		2	2	2	6

=== Results ===
Event	Gold	Silver	Bronze
Boys' tournament	Angola	Egypt	Democratic Republic of the Congo
Girls' tournament	Egypt	Mali	Algeria
