= Zambia at the African Games =

- IOC code: ZAM
- NOC: National Olympic Committee of Zambia
- Medals: Gold 7 Silver 8 Bronze 33 Total 48

African Games appearances (overview)
- 1965; 1973; 1978; 1987; 1991; 1995; 1999; 2003; 2007; 2011; 2015; 2019; 2023

Youth appearances
- 2010; 2014; 2018

Zambia has competed at every edition of the African Games. Its athletes have won a total of 48 medals and 33 of them are bronze.

== Medals by Games ==
Below is a table representing all medals across the Games in which it has competed.

Games	Gold	Silver	Bronze	Total
1965	0	0	1	1
1973	1	0	6	7
1978	2	0	2	4
1987	0	0	3	3
1991	1	0	3	4
1995	0	2	2	4
1999	0	1	0	1
2003	0	1	5	6
2007	1	2	6	9
2011	0	1	1	2
2015	1	0	1	2
2019	1	1	3	5
2023	4	5	5	14
Totals (13 entries)	11	13	38	62

== See also ==
- Zambia at the Olympics
- Zambia at the Paralympics
- Sports in Zambia
