= Fabienne St Louis =

Mauritian triathlete

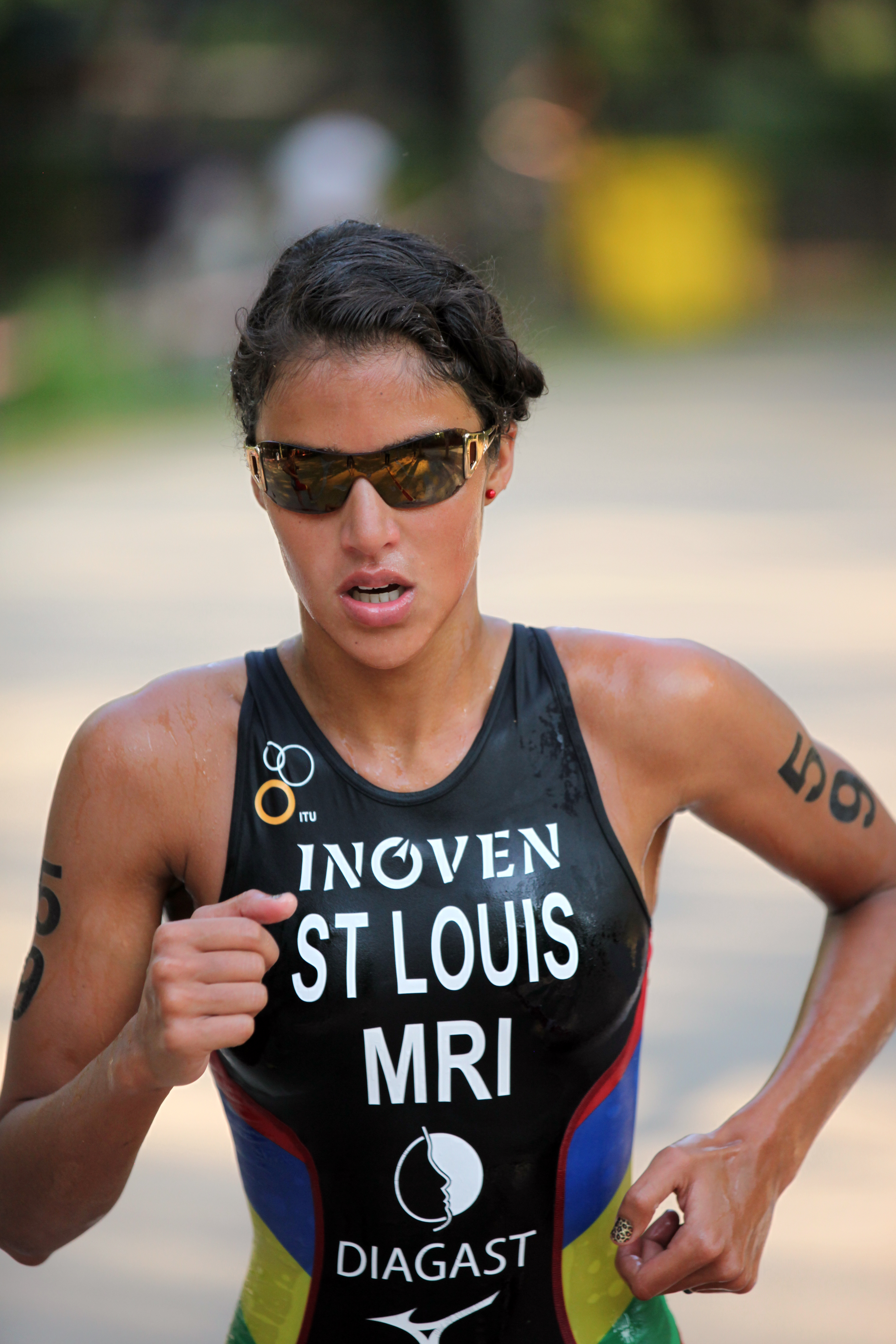
- Fabienne St Louis at the World Triathlon Series triathlon in Madrid, 2012.

Personal information
- Full name: Fabienne Aline St Louis
- Nationality: Mauritian
- Born: March 22, 1988 (age 38) Curepipe, Mauritius
- Height: 1.71 m (5 ft 7 in)
- Weight: 54 kg (119 lb)

Sport
- Sport: Triathlon
Medal record
Fabienne St Louis
Medal record
Women's Triathlon
Representing Mauritius
All-Africa Games
Bronze medal – third place	2011 Maputo	Individual

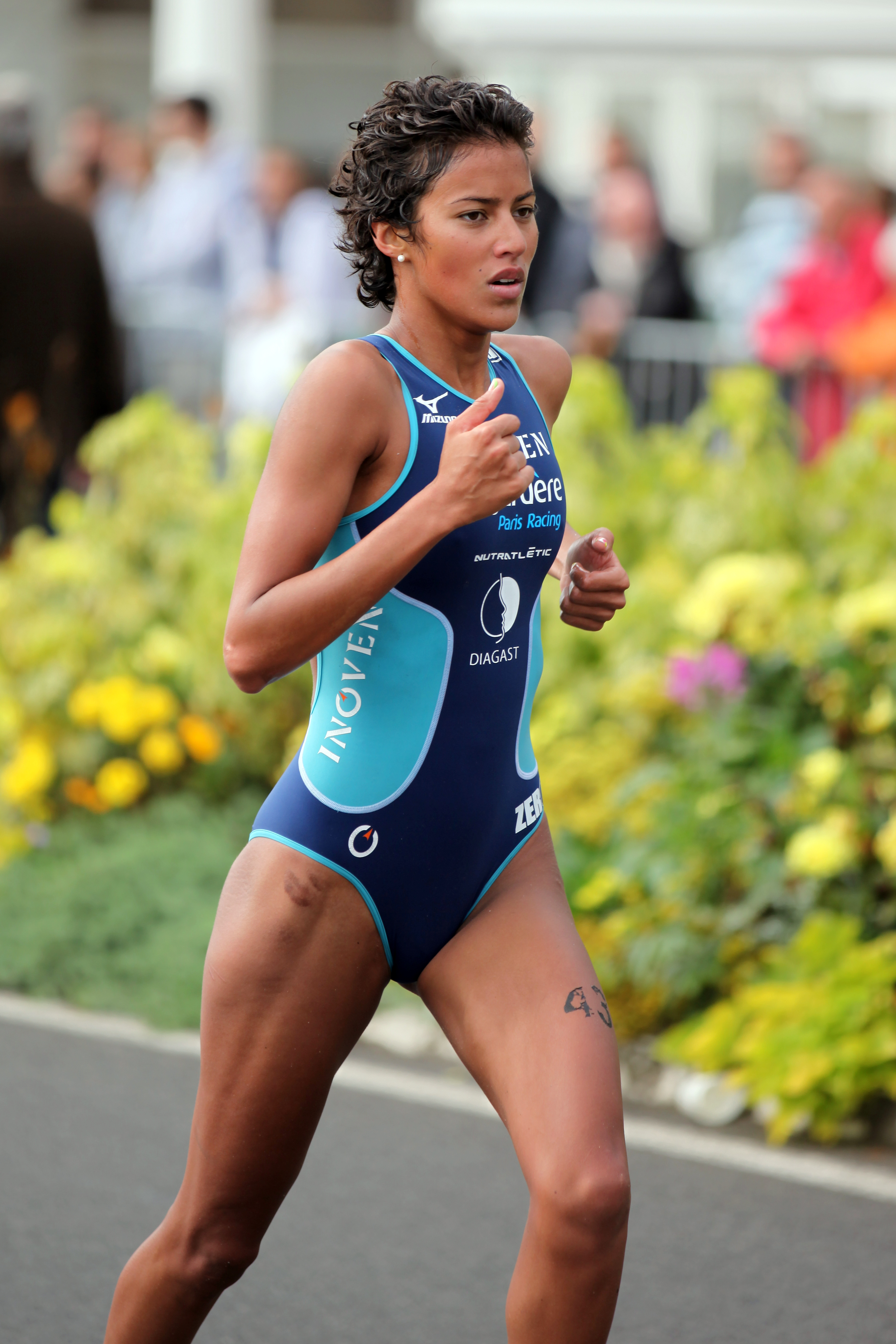
Fabienne St Louis at the Grand Final of the Grand Prix de Triathlon in La Baule, 2011.

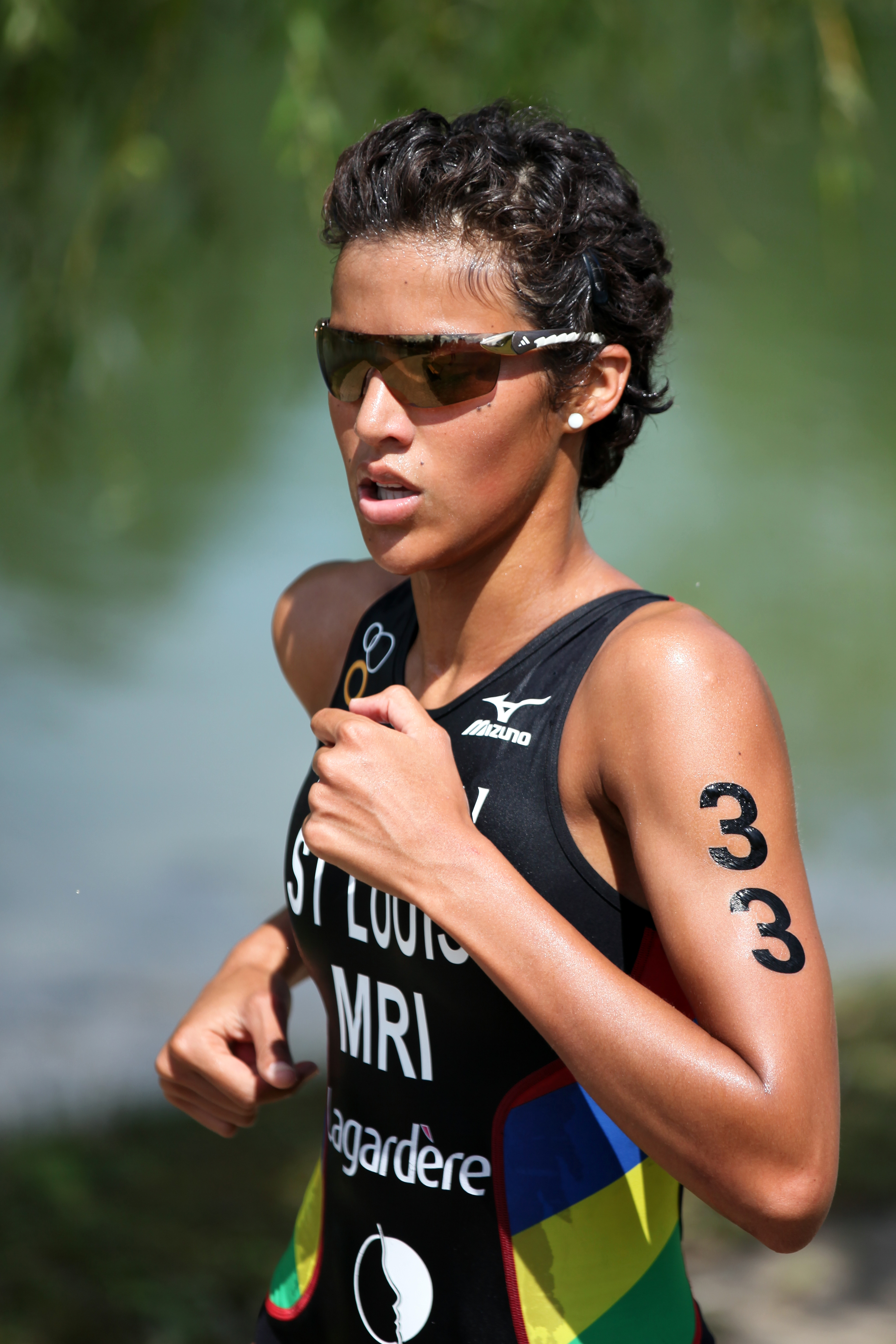
Fabienne St Louis at the World Cup in Tiszaújváros, 2011.

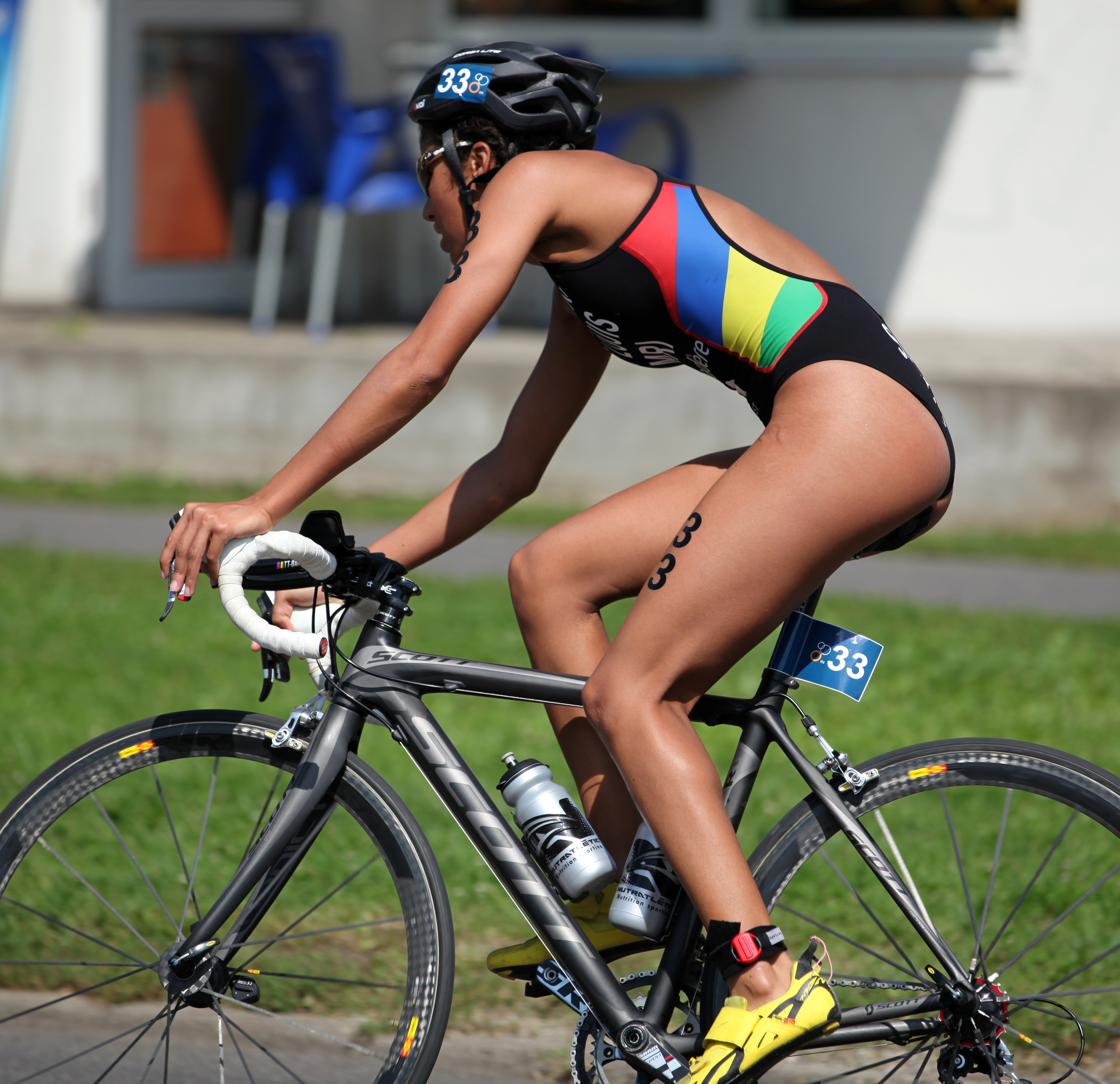
Fabienne St Louis at the World Cup in Tiszaújváros, 2011.

Fabienne Aline St Louis (born 22 March 1988) is a Mauritian professional triathlete, the African U23 Vice Champion (2007, 2008, 2009, and 2010), Elite Vice Champion (2010), and U23 African Champion (2011).

St Louis qualified for the London Olympics 2012. She competed at the 2014 Commonwealth Games. Despite being diagnosed with cancer in 2015, she qualified for the 2016 Summer Olympics.

== Education ==
Fabienne Saint-Louis attended the French school Lycée La Bourdonnais in Curepipe. From 2007/08 to 2009/10, as with the French triathletes Laurent Vidal and David Hauss, she took part in an education programme in Paris arranged by the Jean-Luc Lagardère Foundation and the lifelong learning institution, Sciences Po. This programme is designed to meet the needs of high performance sports people.

== French triathlons ==
Within France, St Louis was the best elite triathlete of Lagardère Paris Racing for several years. She represented the club in the Championnat de France des clubs D2, winning gold medals at St. Cyr (9 May 2009), Saint Jean de Monts (27 June 2009), and at the D2 finale in Betton (12 September 2009).

In 2009, St Louis also took part in two of the Everyman Olympic Distance competitions organized as part of the Club Championship Series Lyonnaise des Eaux, winning the gold medal in Paris, and placing fourth at the Grand Final in La Baule.

In addition to minor competitions like the Triathlon de Pont-Audemer (17 May 2009), the Triathlon International de Mimizan (30/31 May 2009), and the Triathlon International de Larmor-Plage (23 August 2009), which St Louis won, she also won the bronze medal at the French U23 Championships in Belfort on 6/7 June 2009, which, however, caused controversy in the French media because it was not clear whether, as a Mauritian citizen, she could be awarded the bronze medal at the French National Championships.

In 2011, for the first time, St Louis took part in the French Club Championship Series Lyonnaise des Eaux together with teammates Emmie Charayron and Rebecca Robisch. She won the first triathlon of this French circuit in Nice on 24 April 2011, placing 16th in the individual ranking.

== ITU Competitions ==
Since 2006, St Louis has achieved medal positions at numerous ITU events. From 2009 onwards, she competed in the European U23 Championships (as a Mauritian citizen) and a World Cup, placing 13th in Tarzo Revine and 11th in Huatulco respectively. At the first ITU triathlon of the 2011 season, Saint Louis placed 12th in Quarteira.

In the five years from 2006 to 2011, Fabienne St Louis took part in 28 ITU competitions and achieved 14 top ten positions. The following list is based upon the official ITU rankings and the athlete's Profile Page. Unless indicated otherwise, the following events are triathlons (Olympic Distance) and belong to the Elite category.

Thanks to a New Flag spot, for which she was the sole contender, St Louis qualified for the London Olympics 2012 although she ranked only 80th in the 2012 ITU Point List / Women's Standing as of 27 May 2012.

In December 2015, St Louis was diagnosed with cancer but despite this she qualified for the 2016 Summer Olympics in Rio.

Date	Competition	Place	Rank
2006-09-02	World Championships (Junior)	Lausanne	65
2007-03-31	African Championships (U23)	Le Coco Beach	2
2007-08-31	World Championships (U23)	Hamburg	DNF
2007-10-06	African Cup	Mariental	2
2007-11-03	African Cup	Troutbeck	DNF
2007-11-17	African Cup	Mombasa	2
2008-03-08	African Championships (U23)	Yasmine Hammamet	2
2008-09-27	BG World Cup	Lorient	DNF
2009-06-20	European Championships (U23)	Tarzo Revine	13
2009-07-04	African Championships (U23)	Durban	2
2009-09-11	Dextro Energy World Championship Series: U23 Championships	Gold Coast	DNF
2009-11-08	World Cup	Huatulco	11
2009-12-19	African Cup	Mauritius	3
2010-05-09	African Championships (U23)	Durban	2
2010-07-10	World Cup	Holten	39
2010-08-08	World Cup	Tiszaújváros	40
2010-09-08	World Championships (U23)	Budapest	34
2010-09-19	African Cup	Mombasa	1
2010-11-19	African Cup	Troutbeck	1
2010-12-18	African Cup	Mauritius	2
2011-04-09	European Cup	Quarteira	12
2011-07-03	African Championships (U23)	Maputo	1
2011-08-14	World Cup	Tiszaújváros	DNF
2011-08-20	Sprint World Championships	Lausanne	26
2011-09-03	10th All Africa Games	Maputo	3
2011-09-09	World Championships (U23)	Beijing	DNF
2011-11-19	African Cup	Troutbeck	2
2011-12-17	African Cup	Mauritius	6
2012-03-18	Premium African Cup	Port Elizabeth	15
2012-03-31	African Championships	Le Morne	4
2012-04-07	African Cup	Larache	12
2012-05-06	World Cup	Huatulco	24
2012-05-10	World Triathlon Series	San Diego	DNF
2012-05-26	World Triathlon Series	Madrid	51

DNF = did not finish · DNS = did not start
