= Karate at the African Games =

Karate competitions

- Karate
- Frequency: Every four years
- Inaugurated: 1991 (Egypt) Cairo
- Most recent: 2023 (Ghana) Accra

Karate was an African Games event at its inaugural edition in 1991 and has continued to feature prominently at the competition in each of its subsequent editions. At least one karateka has gone on to compete in the Olympics.

== Editions ==
Games	Year	Host city	Events		Best nation
Games	Year	Host city	Men	Women	Best nation
V	1991	(Egypt) Cairo		—N/a	Egypt
VI	1995	(Zimbabwe) Harare			
VII	1999	(South Africa) Johannesburg			
VIII	2003	(Nigeria) Abuja	5	7	Egypt
IX	2007	(Algeria) Algiers	8	8	Algeria
X	2011	(Mozambique) Maputo	8	8	Egypt
XI	2015	(Republic of the Congo) Brazzaville	8	8	Algeria
XII	2019	(Morocco) Rabat	8	8	Morocco
XIII	2023	(Ghana) Accra	8	8	Egypt
