= Guinea at the 2007 All-Africa Games =

- IOC code: GUI
- NOC: Comité National Olympique et Sportif Guinéen

in Algiers 11 July 2007 – 23 July 2007
- Medals Ranked 29th: Gold 0 Silver 1 Bronze 2 Total 3

All-Africa Games appearances (overview)
- 1973; 1978–1991; 1995; 1999; 2003; 2007; 2011; 2015; 2019; 2023

Guinea competed in the 2007 All-Africa Games held at the Stade du 5 Juillet in the city of Algiers, Algeria. It was the fourth time that the country had competed in the games and the team left with three medals, including a silver for the national team in the men's football tournament.

== Competitors ==
Guinea entered a wide range of athletics competitions, including the men's 100 metres, 200 metres, 400 metres (in both the men's and women's events), 1,500 metres, 5,000 metres, long jump. The country also competed in other events, including boxing, where Ibrahima Keita and Lamarana Conde made it to the quarter finals, the former winning to subsequently achieve a bronze medal.

== Medal summary ==
Namibia won three medals, a silver and two bronze.

=== Medal table ===
Sport	Gold	Silver	Bronze	Total
Athletics	0	0	1	1
Boxing	0	0	1	1
Football	0	1	0	1
Total	0	1	2	3

== List of Medalists ==
=== Silver Medal ===
Medal	Name	Sport	Event	Date	Ref
Silver	Guinea national under-23 football team	Football	Men's tournament	23 July	

=== Bronze Medal ===
Medal	Name	Sport	Event	Date	Ref
Bronze	Ibrahima Keita	Boxing	Men's Featherweight (– 57 kilograms)	17 July	
Bronze	Fatoumata Fofana	Athletics	Women's 100 metres hurdles	20 July	

== See also ==
- Guinea at the African Games
