= Algeria at the 1965 All-Africa Games =

- IOC code: ALG
- NOC: Algerian Olympic Committee

in Brazzaville
- Medals Ranked 7th: Gold 2 Silver 3 Bronze 6 Total 11

All-Africa Games appearances (overview)
- 1965; 1973; 1978; 1987; 1991; 1995; 1999; 2003; 2007; 2011; 2015; 2019; 2023

Youth appearances
- 2010; 2014

Algeria, participated at the 1965 All-Africa Games held in the city of Brazzaville, Congo-Brazzaville.

== Medal summary ==
=== Medal table ===
Sport	Gold	Silver	Bronze	Total
Boxing	0	1	1	2
Cycling	2	1	0	3
Judo	0	0	1	1
Swimming	0	1	4	5
Total	2	3	6	11

=== Medalists ===
Medal	Name	Sport	Event
Gold	Ahmed Djellil	Cycling	Men's Individual road race (143 km)
Gold	Tahar Zaâf, Hamza Ouachek	Cycling	Men's time trial
Silver	Omar "Kaddour" Aliane	Boxing	Men's Heavyweight (-91 kg)
Silver	Tahar Zaâf	Cycling	Men's Individual road race (143 km)
Silver	Algeria team	Swimming	Men's 4 × 200 m freestyle relay
Bronze	Kouider Ayad	Boxing	Men's Flyweight (-52 kg)
Bronze	Ahmed Chabi	Judo	Men's Heavyweight (+100 kg)
Bronze	... Ladjel	Swimming	Men's 200 m freestyle
Bronze	... Khemissa	Swimming	Men's 400 m freestyle
Bronze	... Belhocine	Swimming	Men's 200 m backstroke
Bronze	Algeria team	Swimming	Men's 4 × 100 m freestyle relay
