= Guinea at the 2019 African Games =

- Flag of Guinea
- IOC code: GUI
- NOC: Comité National Olympique et Sportif Guinéen

in Rabat, Morocco 19 August 2019 – 31 August 2019
- Competitors: 56 (32 men and 24 women) in 12 sports
- Medals Ranked 38th: Gold 0 Silver 0 Bronze 2 Total 2

African Games appearances (overview)
- 1973; 1978–1991; 1995; 1999; 2003; 2007; 2011; 2015; 2019; 2023

Guinea competed at the 2019 African Games held from 19 to 31 August 2019 in Rabat, Morocco. In total, two bronze medals were won and the country finished in 38th place in the medal table, shared with Benin and Togo.

== Medal summary ==
=== Medal table ===
Medal	Name	Sport	Event	Date
Bronze	Fatoumata Yarie Camara	Wrestling	Women's freestyle 62 kg	29 August

== Archery ==
Mohamed Diao and Fatoumata Sylla represented Guinea in archery. Diao competed in the men's individual recurve event and Sylla competed in the women's individual recurve event. Together they competed in the mixed team recurve event.

== Athletics ==
Three athletes represented Guinea in athletics.

Aboubabacar Barry competed in the men's 100 metres event and he finished in 45th place.

Barry and Cheick Aboubacar Camara also competed in the men's 200 metres event and they finished in 41st and 46th place respectively.

Makoura Keita competed in the women's 100 metres event and she finished in 39th place in the heats.

== Badminton ==
Amadou Bah competed in the men's singles event and Kadiatou Balde competed in the women's singles event. They were both eliminated in the first round.

== Boxing ==
Mamadou Keita (men's 52 kg) and Alseny Sylla (men's 63 kg) competed in boxing.

== Cycling ==
Abdoulaye Bangoura and Ibrahima Sory Sylla represented Guinea in cycling. They both competed in the men's individual time trial (road cycling) and the men's road race.

== Handball ==
Both Guinea's national handball team and women's national handball team competed in handball at the 2019 African Games.

In the men's tournament the team finished in 7th place and in the women's tournament the team finished in 4th place.

== Judo ==
Two athletes were registered to compete in their events but they did not compete in their events.

== Swimming ==
Mamadou Tahirou Bah and Mariama Lamarana Toure represented Guinea in swimming.

Bah competed in the men's 50 metre freestyle and men's 100 metre freestyle events.

Toure competed in the women's 50 metre breaststroke and the women's 50 metre freestyle events.

== Table tennis ==
Guinea competed in table tennis.

Maret Camara competed in the men's singles event. He won his first match against El Moctar Ahmed Salem and lost his next match against Idowu Saheed.

Fatou Bangoura competed in the women's singles event. She lost her only match against Mazombo Sabrina Roseline.

== Taekwondo ==
Two athletes competed in Taekwondo.

Athlete	Event	Round of 32	Round of 16	Quarterfinals	Semifinals	Final	
Athlete	Event	Opposition Result	Opposition Result	Opposition Result	Opposition Result	Opposition Result	Rank
Salia Soumah	Men's –63 kg	—	Demisu (ETH); L 3–25	did not advance			
Oumou Koultoumy Diallo	Women's –49 kg	—	Mehdi (ALG); W 20–15	Ouhadi (MAR); L 5–32	did not advance		

== Tennis ==
Alpha Diallo and Mamadouba Makadji competed in tennis in the men's singles event. Both were eliminated in their first match.

== Wrestling ==
Three athletes represented Guinea in wrestling.

Key:

- VT – Victory by fall.
- PP – Decision by points – the loser with technical points.
- PO – Decision by points – the loser without technical points.
- ST – Great superiority – the loser without technical points and a margin of victory of at least 8 (Greco-Roman) or 10 (freestyle) points.
- SP – Technical superiority – the loser with technical points and a margin of victory of at least 8 (Greco-Roman) or 10 (freestyle) points.
- IN - Victory by injury - the loser is injured before or during a bout.

Men's freestyle

Athlete	Event	Qualification	Quarterfinal	Semifinal	Repechage 1	Final / BM	
Athlete	Event	Opposition Result	Opposition Result	Opposition Result	Opposition Result	Opposition Result	Rank
Mohamed Ismaele Camara	−57 kg	D Fafé (GBS); L 0–12 ^{VT}	did not advance				13
Mohamed Saliou Camara	−97 kg	M Fardj (ALG); L 0–10 ^{ST}	did not advance				10

Women's freestyle

Athlete	Event	Group Stages		Semifinal	Final / BM	
Athlete	Event	Opposition Result	Standing	Opposition Result	Opposition Result	Rank
Fatoumata Yarie Camara	−62 kg	Group B S Goudiaby (SEN): W 10–0 ^{ST} B Etane Ngolle (CMR): L 1–2 ^{PP}	2	A Adeniyi (NGR); L 0–10 ^{ST}	A Elsebaee Ibrahim (EGY); W 10–0 ^{ST}	3rd place, bronze medalist(s)
