= Karate at the 2014 African Youth Games =

Karate competition

- Venue: Boipuso Hall
- Dates: 28–31 May
- Competitors: from 3- nations

2014 African Youth Games in Gaborone was held between 28 and 31 May at the Botswana National Stadium. The competition served as the qualification for the 2014 Summer Youth Olympics which took place in August in Nanjing, China.

== Medal summary ==
=== Medal table ===
* Host nation (Botswana)

Rank	Nation	Gold	Silver	Bronze	Total
1	Egypt	6	0	4	10
2	Botswana*	3	1	2	6
3	Algeria	2	5	1	8
4	Morocco	2	1	1	4
5	South Africa	0	3	5	8
6	Tunisia	0	2	1	3
7	Republic of the Congo	0	1	0	1
8	Libya	0	0	4	4
8	Nigeria	0	0	4	4
10	Zimbabwe	0	0	2	2
11	Cameroon	0	0	1	1
11	Chad	0	0	1	1
Totals (12 entries)		13	13	26	52

=== Boys events ===
Event	Gold	Silver	Bronze
Boys' individual Kata	MOHAMED ZEYAD; Egypt	TLOTLANG PONATSHEGO; Botswana	SILIVIO BIAGIONI; South Africa MOHAMED JHARI; Libya
Boys' Kumite-55 kg	THABANG SETSHEGO; Botswana	MBOSSA IWANDZA; Republic of the Congo}	MALEH GOMAA; Egypt ANAS BELRWAA; Libya
Boys' -61 kg	Navid Mohammadi; Morocco	Nabil Ech-Chaabi; Algeria	Enes Bulut; Egypt Sean McCarthy Crean; South Africa
Boys' Kumite-68 kg	AHMED RAGAB; Egypt	MASSY L SENAOUI; Algeria	TLOTLANG PONATSHEGO; Botswana HANNACHI ADEM; Tunisia
Boys' Kumite-76	SAMI BRAHIMI; Algeria	BOUKACHTA NAIM; Tunisia	ODOGMELAM DIVINE; Nigeria AHMED ELSAYED; Egypt
Boys' Kumite+76	DESSAOUDI DIDA; Morocco	SAMI BRAHIMI; Algeria	ALY YAHOUDT; Egypt MICHEAL UYS; South Africa
Boys'team Kata	? Botswana	? South Africa	? Libya ? Nigeria

=== Girls events ===
Event	Gold	Silver	Bronze
Girls' individual kata	AYA HESHAM; Egypt	BELABES YAMINA; Algeria	NAOMI MANDENGENDA; Zimbabwe AGALNAN HESHAM; Morocco
Girls' -48 kg	ISRAG NABIL; Egypt	MOKHTARI; Algeria	WATHUTO MAAKE; Botswana MINET UYS; South Africa
Girls' -53 kg	MAYA MAMOED; Egypt	AGALNAN SANAE; Morocco	SIOVDA DJIHAN; Algeria NAOMI MANDENGENDA; Zimbabwe
Girls' -59 kg	RADWA ARAKA; Egypt	CHEYENNE BARROS; South Africa	NSIOMA BISSONONG; Cameroon GRACE GAB; Chad
Girls' +59 kg	YASMINE KHAOVS; Algeria	JEMI CHAHNEZ; Tunisia	NWANKWO CAROLINE; Nigeria ANKE SUIT; South Africa
Girls' team kata	? Botswana	? South Africa	? Libya ? Nigeria
