= Senegal at the African Games =

- IOC code: SEN
- Medals Ranked 7th: Gold 69 Silver 78 Bronze 171 Total 318

African Games appearances (overview)
- 1965; 1973; 1978; 1987; 1991; 1995; 1999; 2003; 2007; 2011; 2015; 2019; 2023; 2027

Senegal has competed in the African Games since the first edition in 1965. Until 2015, the competition was known as the All-Africa Games. Senegal has won a total of 289 medals.

== Medals by Games ==
Below is a table representing all Senegalese medals across the Games in which it has competed.

Games	Gold	Silver	Bronze	Total
1965	6	3	7	16
1973	4	2	6	12
1978	4	2	4	10
1987	7	2	12	21
1991	3	4	11	18
1995	5	4	6	15
1999	6	10	9	25
2003	6	9	19	34
2007	8	12	26	46
2011	8	8	17	33
2015	7	10	20	37
2019	1	5	16	22
2023	4	7	18	29
Totals (13 entries)	69	78	171	318

== See also ==
- Senegal at the Olympics
- Senegal at the Paralympics
- Sports in Senegal
