= Guinea at the African Games =

- IOC code: GUI
- NOC: Comité National Olympique Guinealais
- Medals: Gold 1 Silver 3 Bronze 6 Total 10

African Games appearances (overview)
- 1973; 1978–1991; 1995; 1999; 2003; 2007; 2011; 2015; 2019; 2023

Guinea (GUI) has competed in the eight African Games. The country first took part in the second games that took place in 1973, when the team won a gold and a silver medal, the latter in football. The country next appeared twelve years later at the event in 1995. Athletes from Guinea have subsequently won a total of eight other medals, including two silver.

== Participation ==
Guinea first entered the African Games (then called the All-African Games) in 1973. The team came away with a silver medal in the football tournament that year, beating the host nation, Nigeria. The country has not sent teams to the following tournaments, returning in 1995. The country also attended in 2003, 2007, 2015, and, most recently, 2019.

== Medal tables ==
=== Medals by Games ===
Below is a table representing all the medals won by Guinea at the Games.

Games	Athletes	Gold	Silver	Bronze	Total	Rank
1973 Lagos		1	1	0	2	13
1995 Harare		0	1	0	1	24
2003 Abuja		0	0	1	1	36
2007 Algiers		0	1	2	3	29
2015 Brazzaville		0	0	1	1	38
2019 Rabat		0	0	2	2	38
Total		1	3	6	10	

== See also ==
- Guinea at the Olympics
- Guinea at the Paralympics
- Sport in Guinea
