= Canoeing at the African Games =

- Canoeing
- Frequency: Every four years
- Inaugurated: 2011 (Mozambique) Maputo
- Most recent: 2019 (Morocco) Rabat
- Best: South Africa (RSA)

Canoeing is an African Games event at its inaugural edition in 2011 in Maputo, Mozambique.

== Editions ==
Games	Year	Host city	Events		Top Country
Games	Year	Host city	Men	Women	Top Country
X	2011	(Mozambique) Maputo	10	5	South Africa
XI	2015	Not held			
XII	2019	(Morocco) Rabat	9	9	South Africa
XIII	2023	Not held			

== Medal table ==
Rank	Nation	Gold	Silver	Bronze	Total
1	South Africa (RSA)	8	3	0	11
2	Tunisia (TUN)	3	4	1	8
3	Angola (ANG)	2	1	2	5
4	Algeria (ALG)	1	3	0	4
5	Kenya (KEN)	1	2	1	4
6	Senegal (SEN)	0	1	5	6
7	Nigeria (NGA)	0	1	2	3
8	Egypt (EGY)	0	0	1	1
8	Mozambique (MOZ)	0	0	1	1
8	São Tomé and Príncipe (STP)	0	0	1	1
Totals (10 entries)		15	15	14	44
