= 2031 African Games =

Multi-sport event in Kampala, Uganda

XV African Games
- Host city: Kampala
- Nations: TBD
- Athletes: TBD
- Events: TBD
- Opening: TBD
- Closing: TBD
- Opened by: President of Uganda (expected)
- Main venue: Mandela National Stadium

The 2031 edition of the African games will be the XIV (15th edition) of African Games. This edition of games will be hosted by Kampala, Uganda.

== Bids ==
- Abuja, Nigeria
- Kampala, Uganda

On 5 June 2026, Kampala, Uganda was awarded the games becoming the second East African city to host after Nairobi, Kenya in 1987.

== See also ==
- African Games
