= Kenya at the African Games =

- IOC code: KEN
- NOC: National Olympic Committee of Kenya
- Medals: Gold 135 Silver 154 Bronze 164 Total 453

African Games appearances (overview)
- 1965; 1973; 1978; 1987; 1991; 1995; 1999; 2003; 2007; 2011; 2015; 2019; 2023

Youth appearances
- 2010; 2014

Kenya (KEN) has competed at every edition of the African Games. Since its inauguration in 1965, Kenyan athletes have won a total of 33 medals. Kenya has hosted the games once in 1987, with the events taking place in the Moi International Sports Centre in Nairobi.

== Medal tables ==
=== Medals by Games ===
Host nation

Below is a table representing all Kenyan medals around the Games.

Games	Gold	Silver	Bronze	Total
1965	8	11	4	23
1973	9	9	18	36
1978	11	8	8	27
1987*	22	25	16	63
1991	13	17	18	48
1995	12	11	17	40
1999	10	10	20	40
2003	5	5	4	14
2007	13	15	10	38
2011	14	14	22	50
2015	7	19	17	43
2019	11	10	10	31
2023	8	8	21	37
Totals (13 entries)	143	162	185	490

== See also ==
- Kenya at the Olympics
- Kenya at the Paralympics
- Sports in Kenya
