= Triathlon at the 2011 All-Africa Games =

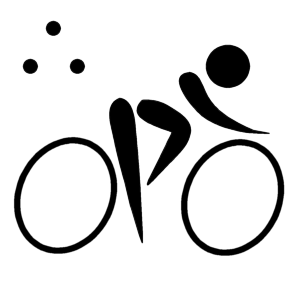
Olympic pictogram for Triathlon

The Triathlon competitions at the 2011 All-Africa Games were held on Sunday, September 4 in Bilene. Both the men's and women's events were held on the same day.

== Events ==
Event	Gold	Silver	Bronze
Men's individual	Erhard Wolfaardt; South Africa	Abrahm Louw; Namibia	Wian Sullwald; South Africa
Women's individual	Carlyn Fischer; South Africa	Andrea Steyn; South Africa	Fabienne St Louis; Mauritius

=== Medal table ===
Rank	Nation	Gold	Silver	Bronze	Total
1	South Africa	2	1	1	4
2	Namibia	0	1	0	1
3	Mauritius	0	0	1	1
Totals (3 entries)		2	2	2	6
