= Association of African Sports Confederations =

Association of African Sports Confederations Union des Confédérations Sportives Africaines
- Formation: 23 July 1983; 43 years ago
- Type: Sports federation
- Headquarters: Yaoundé, Cameroon
- Members: 54 National Olympic Committees
- Official language: English, French
- Preside: (Egypt) Gen Ahmed Nasser
- Website: www.ucsa-aasc.org

The Association of African Sports Confederations (acronym: AASC; French: Union des Confédérations Sportives Africaines, UCSA; Arabic: أتحادية الكونفدراليات الرياضية الإفريقية) is an international organization for sports in Africa. It is currently headquartered in Abuja, Nigeria. It shall carry out its activities through the General Assembly, which shall be the supreme organ and the Executive Bureau, which shall be the executive organ. It also may set up, if need be, permanent specialised or ad hoc committees to assist it in the discharge of its duties.

== History ==
The Association of African Sports Confederations was founded on 23 July 1983 in Abidjan, Ivory Coast. Actually, the headquarters is located in Yaoundé, Cameroon.
