= 2027 African Games =

Multi-sport event in Cairo, Egypt

XIV African Games
- Host city: Cairo
- Nations: TBD
- Athletes: TBD
- Events: TBD
- Opening: 27 August 2027
- Closing: 10 September 2027
- Opened by: President of Egypt (expected)
- Main venue: TBA

The 2027 edition of the African games will be the XIV (14th edition) of African Games. This edition of games will be hosted by Cairo, Egypt from 27 August to 10 September 2027.

== See also ==
- African Games
