= 2014 African Youth Games =

Multi-sport event in Gaborone, Botswana

- Nations: 51
- Athletes: 2000
- Events: 21 sports
- Opening: 22 May 2014
- Closing: 31 May 2014
- Opened by: Then, President Ian Khama
- Torch lighter: Nijel Amos
- Ceremony venue: Botswana National Stadium, Gaborone, Botswana
- Website: www.gaborone2014.com

The 2nd African Youth Games took place in Gaborone, Botswana's capital city from 22 to 31 May 2014. The Games featured approximately 2000 athletes from 51 African countries competing in 21 sports. Gambia, Eritrea and Mauritania were the only African countries absent from the Games.

The Botswana African Youth Games Organising Committee (BAYGOC) was charged with organising the Games and was headed by Regina Sikalesele Vaka as Chairman while Tuelo Daniel Serufho led the Secretariat as its chief executive officer.

The Games were largely perceived as a success and helped boost the profile of certain sports. In addition, certain sporting codes benefited by receiving material or equipment, but the Botswana National Olympic Committee and other federations were also reportedly left with debt following the event

== Participating nations ==
- Algeria
- Angola
- Benin
- Botswana (host)
- Burkina Faso
- Burundi
- Cameroon
- Cape Verde
- Central African Republic
- Chad
- Comoros
- Republic of the Congo
- Ivory Coast
- Djibouti
- Democratic Republic of the Congo
- Egypt
- Equatorial Guinea
- Eritrea
- Ethiopia
- Gabon
- The Gambia
- Ghana
- Guinea
- Guinea-Bissau
- Kenya
- Lesotho
- Liberia
- Libya
- Madagascar
- Malawi
- Mali
- Mauritania
- Mauritius
- Morocco
- Mozambique
- Namibia
- Niger
- Nigeria
- Rwanda
- São Tomé and Príncipe
- Senegal
- Seychelles
- Sierra Leone
- Somalia
- South Africa
- South Sudan
- Sudan
- Swaziland
- Tanzania
- Togo
- Tunisia
- Uganda
- Zambia
- Zimbabwe

== Sports ==
Twenty one sports were contested in this edition of African Youth Games.

- Athletics
- Badminton
- Basketball
- Boxing
- Canoeing
- Cycling
- Fencing
- Football
- Golf
- Judo
- Karate
- Netball
- Swimming
- Rowing
- Rugby sevens
- Table tennis
- Taekwondo
- Tennis
- Triathlon
- Volleyball
- Weightlifting

== Venues ==
Venues of the 2014 African Youth Games are listed below.

Venue Name	Sports
University of Botswana Olympic Swimming Pool	Swimming
University of Botswana Stadium	Rugby
Botswana National Stadium	Athletics, Football, Rugby
National Tennis Centre	Tennis
Gaborone Golf Club	Golf
Gaborone Dam	Canoeing, Rowing
Boipuso Hall	Karate, Weightlifting
Ditshupo Hall	Judo, Taekwondo
Botswana National Youth Centre (BNYC)	Basketball, Table tennis
Otse Police College	Triathlon, Badminton
Botho University - Multipurpose Hall	Boxing
Sir SeretseKhama Barracks (SSKB)	Football
BONA Courts	Netball
Kgale Hill	Cycling - Mountain Bike
Roads of Gaborone	Cycling - Road cycling

== Medal table ==
Host nation

* Host nation (Botswana)

Rank	Nation	Gold	Silver	Bronze	Total
1	Egypt (EGY)	44	16	29	89
2	South Africa (RSA)	41	25	27	93
3	Nigeria (NGR)	19	10	12	41
4	Algeria (ALG)	15	21	12	48
5	Ethiopia (ETH)	14	6	7	27
6	Tunisia (TUN)	13	15	15	43
7	Kenya (KEN)	7	11	7	25
8	Botswana (BOT)*	6	6	19	31
9	Morocco (MAR)	4	11	10	25
10	Namibia (NAM)	4	5	5	14
11	Mauritius (MRI)	3	10	7	20
12	Madagascar (MAD)	3	3	2	8
13	Cameroon (CMR)	3	0	2	5
14	Libya (LBA)	2	3	5	10
15	Seychelles (SEY)	2	0	3	5
16	Democratic Republic of the Congo (COD)	1	5	3	9
17	Senegal (SEN)	1	3	1	5
18	Zimbabwe (ZIM)	1	2	7	10
19	Mali (MLI)	1	1	6	8
20	Uganda (UGA)	1	0	2	3
21	Chad (CHA)	1	0	1	2
22	Angola (ANG)	1	0	0	1
22	São Tomé and Príncipe (STP)	1	0	0	1
24	Ghana (GHA)	0	8	1	9
25	Ivory Coast (CIV)	0	5	7	12
26	Republic of the Congo (CGO)	0	5	3	8
27	Zambia (ZAM)	0	4	3	7
28	Equatorial Guinea (GEQ)	0	3	0	3
29	Mozambique (MOZ)	0	2	2	4
30	Malawi (MAW)	0	1	0	1
30	Tanzania (TAN)	0	1	0	1
32	Gabon (GAB)	0	0	4	4
33	Sierra Leone (SLE)	0	0	3	3
34	Burundi (BDI)	0	0	2	2
34	Cape Verde (CPV)	0	0	2	2
34	Guinea (GUI)	0	0	2	2
34	Rwanda (RWA)	0	0	2	2
34	Togo (TOG)	0	0	2	2
39	Lesotho (LES)	0	0	1	1
39	Liberia (LBR)	0	0	1	1
39	Sudan (SUD)	0	0	1	1
39	Swaziland (SWZ)	0	0	1	1
Totals (42 entries)		188	182	219	589
