= African Games =

African multi-sport event

- 1965; 1973; 1978; 1987; 1991; 1995; 1999; 2003; 2007; 2011; 2015; 2019; 2023; 2027
- Athletics; Badminton; Baseball; Basketball; Boxing; Canoeing; Chess; Cricket; Cycling; Diving; Equestrian; Fencing; Football; Gymnastics; Handball; Field hockey; Judo; Karate; Kick-boxing; Netball; Rowing; Sailing; Shooting; Softball; Squash; Swimming; Table tennis; Taekwondo; Tennis; Triathlon; Volleyball; Weightlifting; Wrestling
- Charter; AU; ANOCA; AASC; NOCs

The African Games, formally known as the All-Africa Games or the Pan African Games, are a continental multi-sport event held every four years, organized by the African Union with the Association of National Olympic Committees of Africa and the Association of African Sports Confederation.

All of the competing nations are from the African continent. The first Games were held in 1965 in Brazzaville, Congo. The International Olympic Committee granted these Games official recognition as a continental multi-sport event, along with the Asian Games and Pan American Games. Since 1999, the Games have also included athletes with a disability.

The Supreme Council for Sport in Africa (SCSA) was the organizing body for the Games. On 26 July 2013, the Extraordinary Assembly of the SCSA held in Abidjan, Ivory Coast on the sidelines of the 5th Session of the African Union Conference of Sports Ministers recommended the dissolution of the SCSA and transfer of all its functions, assets & liabilities to the African Union Commission. The organization of the African Games is now managed by three parts, the AU (the owners of the game), the ANOCA (occupying the technical aspects) and the AASC (developing marketing policy, sponsorship and research resources).

After running previous 11 editions as the All-Africa Games, the games has been renamed the African Games. The decision for the name change was arrived at, during the Executive Council meeting of the African Union held in Addis Ababa, Ethiopia in January 2012. 54 countries were participating in the most recent edition in Morocco 2019. In 2023, the 13th edition of the game was hosted in Accra, Ghana. It was aim to use sports for national and continental development, aligning with Ghana's transformative agenda and the African Union's Agenda 2063, "Africa We Want."

== History ==
=== Beginning ===
Modern Olympics founder Pierre de Coubertin conceived the Pan African Games as early as 1920. The colonial powers who ruled Africa at the time were wary of the idea, suspecting the unifying aspect of sport among African people would cause them to assert their independence.

Attempts were made to host the games in Algiers, Algeria in 1925 and Alexandria, Egypt in 1928, but despite considerable preparations taken by coordinators, the efforts failed. The International Olympic Committee's (IOC) first African member, Greek-born Egyptian sprinter Angelo Bolanachi, donated funds to erect a stadium, but still the Games were set back for another three decades.

=== The Friendship Games ===
In the early 1960s, French-speaking countries of Africa including France organized the Friendship Games. The Games were organized by Madagascar (1960) and then Ivory Coast (1961). The third games were set for Senegal in 1963. Before they were completed, African Ministers of Youth and Sport met in Paris in 1962; as a few English-speaking countries were already participating, they rechristened the Games as the Pan African Games. The Games were granted official recognition by the IOC as being on par with other continental Games such as the Asian Games and the Pan American Games.

=== The games ===
In July 1965, the first games were held in Brazzaville, Congo, now called the All-Africa Games. From 30 countries, around 2,500 athletes competed. Egypt topped the medal count for the first Games.

In 1966, the SCSA was organized in Bamako; it manages the All-Africa Games. The second edition were awarded to Mali in 1969, but a military coup forced the cancellation of the Games. Lagos, Nigeria stepped in as host for the Games in 1971. Those Games were finally held in 1973 due to the Biafra War, which had just ended in Nigeria.

In 1977, the 3rd Games were scheduled to take place in Algeria but due to technical reasons had to be postponed for a year and were held in 1978. Continuing the pattern, the next Games were scheduled to take place in Kenya in 1983, but were pushed back to 1985 and finally took place in Nairobi in 1987.

The four-year Olympic rhythm has not missed a beat since, and the Games have been organized in Cairo, Harare, Johannesburg, and Abuja. In 2007, Algiers once again hosted, becoming the first repeat host. The 2011 edition of the All-Africa Games was held in Maputo, Mozambique in September 2011. Brazzaville hosted the 2015 edition in honor of the Games' 50th anniversary.

== Participation ==
All 53 members affiliated to the Association of National Olympic Committees of Africa (ANOCA) are eligible to take part in the Games. In history, the 53 National Olympic Committees (NOCs) have sent competitors to the Games.

South Africa was banned since the beginning of the games in the 1965 All-Africa Games till the 1995 All-Africa Games because Apartheid officially ended when it was invited for the first time to compete the games.

Morocco was banned from the games from the 1987 All-Africa Games to the 2015 African Games because of a political dispute over Western Sahara. Morocco claims the territory as its "Southern Provinces" and controls 80% of it while the Sahrawi Arab Democratic Republic, which claims to be a sovereign state, controls the remaining 20% as the "Free Zone". In 2018, after the Moroccan government signed its treaty of return to the African Union, the country also pledged to return to the African Games. Rabat, Morocco hosted the 2019 African Games.

== Editions ==
Host cities of the African Games

| Games | Year | Host | Opened by | Dates | Nations | Competitors | | | Sports | Events | Top nation |
| Games | Year | Host | Opened by | Dates | Nations | Men | Women | Total | Sports | Events | Top nation |
|---|---|---|---|---|---|---|---|---|---|---|---|
| 1 | 1965 | (Republic of the Congo) Brazzaville | Alphonse Massemba | 18–28 July | 30 | | | 2,500 | 10 | 54 | (United Arab Republic) Egypt |
| – | 1969 | (Mali) Bamako | Disrupted by military coup | | | | | | | | |
| 2 | 1973 | (Nigeria) Lagos | Yakubu Gowon | 7–18 January | 36 | | | | 12 | 92 | Egypt |
| 3 | 1978 | (Algeria) Algiers | Houari Boumediene | 13–28 July | 38 | | | 3,000 | 12 | 117 | Tunisia |
| 4 | 1987 | (Kenya) Nairobi | Daniel Arap Moi | 1–12 August | 41 | | | | 14 | 164 | Egypt |
| 5 | 1991 | (Egypt) Cairo | Hosni Mubarak | 20 September – 1 October | 43 | | | | 18 | 213 | Egypt |
| 6 | 1995 | (Zimbabwe) Harare | Robert Mugabe | 13–23 September | 46 | | | 6,000 | 19 | 224 | South Africa |
| 7 | 1999 | (South Africa) Johannesburg | Thabo Mbeki | 10–19 September | 51 | | | 6,000 | 20 | 224 | South Africa |
| 8 | 2003 | (Nigeria) Abuja | Olusegun Obasanjo | 5–17 October | 50 | | | 6,000 | 22 | 332 | Nigeria |
| 9 | 2007 | (Algeria) Algiers | Abdelaziz Bouteflika | 11–23 July | 52 | | | 4,793 | 27 | 374 | Egypt |
| 10 | 2011 | (Mozambique) Maputo | Armando Guebuza | 3–18 September | 53 | | | 5,000 | 20 | 244 | South Africa |
| 11 | 2015 | (Republic of the Congo) Brazzaville | Denis Nguesso | 4–19 September | 54 | | | 15,000 | 22 | 323 | Egypt |
| 12 | 2019 | (Morocco) Rabat | Prince Moulay Rachid | 19–31 August | 54 | | | 4,386 | 26 | 343 | Egypt |
| 13 | 2023 | (Ghana) Accra | Nana Akufo-Addo | 8 – 23 March 2024 | 52 | 1,490 | 1,154 | 2,644 | 23 | 335 | Egypt |
| 14 | 2027 | (Egypt) Cairo | President of Egypt (expected) | 20 January – 7 February | Future event | | | | | | |
| 15 | 2031 | (Uganda) Kampala | President of Uganda (expected) | TBD | Future event | | | | | | |

=== Unofficial editions ===
1. 1925 Algiers, Algeria – Not held
2. 1928 Alexandria, Egypt – Not held
3. 1960 African Friendship Games – Madagascar – French-speaking countries of Africa
4. 1961 African Friendship Games – Ivory Coast – French-speaking countries of Africa
5. 1963 African Friendship Games – Senegal – Not held

== Sports ==
35 sports, 2 demonstration sports and 6 Para sports were presented in African Games history until 2019 African Games (also 1991 Diving and 1999 Netball were demonstration).

| Number | Event | 1965 | 1973 | 1978 | 1987 | 1991 | 1995 | 1999 | 2003 | 2007 | 2011 | 2015 | 2019 | 2023 |
Main Sports
| 1 | Athletics | Yes | Yes | Yes | Yes | Yes | Yes | Yes | Yes | Yes | Yes | Yes | Yes | Yes |
| 2 | Cycling | Yes | Yes | Yes | Yes | Yes | Yes | Yes | Yes | Yes | Yes | Yes | Yes | Yes |
| 3 | Gymnastics | No | No | No | No | Yes | Yes | Yes | Yes | Yes | No | Yes | Yes | No |
| 4 | Shooting | No | No | No | No | Yes | Yes | No | No | Yes | No | No | Yes | No |
| 5 | Swimming | Yes | Yes | Yes | Yes | Yes | Yes | Yes | Yes | Yes | Yes | Yes | Yes | Yes |
Boat Sports
| 6 | Canoeing | No | No | No | No | No | No | No | No | No | Yes | No | Yes | No |
| 7 | Rowing | No | No | No | No | No | No | No | No | Yes | No | No | Yes | No |
| 8 | Sailing | No | No | No | No | No | No | No | No | Yes | Yes | No | No | No |
Combat Sports
| 9 | Arm Wrestling | No | No | No | No | No | No | No | No | No | No | No | No | Yes |
| 10 | Boxing | Yes | Yes | Yes | Yes | Yes | Yes | Yes | Yes | Yes | Yes | Yes | Yes | Yes |
| 11 | Fencing | No | No | No | No | No | No | No | No | Yes | Yes | Yes | Yes | No |
| 12 | Judo | Yes | Yes | Yes | Yes | Yes | Yes | Yes | Yes | Yes | Yes | Yes | Yes | Yes |
| 13 | Karate | No | No | No | No | Yes | Yes | Yes | Yes | Yes | Yes | Yes | Yes | Yes |
| 14 | Kickboxing | No | No | No | No | No | No | No | No | Yes | No | No | No | No |
| 15 | Taekwondo | No | No | No | Yes | Yes | Yes | Yes | Yes | Yes | Yes | Yes | Yes | Yes |
| 16 | Wrestling | Yes | Yes | Yes | Yes | Yes | Yes | Yes | Yes | Yes | Yes | Yes | Yes | Yes |
Team Sports
| 17 | Baseball | No | No | No | No | No | Yes | Yes | Yes | No | No | No | No | No |
| 18 | Basketball | Yes | Yes | Yes | Yes | Yes | Yes | Yes | Yes | Yes | Yes | Yes | No | No |
| 19 | Beach volleyball | No | No | No | No | No | No | No | No | No | Yes | Yes | Yes | Yes |
| 20 | 3x3 basketball | No | No | No | No | No | No | No | No | No | No | No | Yes | Yes |
| 21 | Cricket | No | No | No | No | No | No | No | No | No | No | No | No | Yes |
| 22 | Field hockey | No | No | No | Yes | Yes | Yes | Yes | Yes | No | No | No | No | Yes |
| 23 | Football | Yes | Yes | Yes | Yes | Yes | Yes | Yes | Yes | Yes | Yes | Yes | Yes | Yes |
| 24 | Handball | Yes | Yes | Yes | Yes | Yes | Yes | Yes | Yes | Yes | Yes | Yes | Yes | Yes |
| 25 | Netball | No | No | No | No | No | No | Dem | No | No | Yes | No | No | No |
| 26 | Rugby sevens | No | No | No | No | No | No | No | No | No | No | No | No | Yes |
| 27 | Softball | No | No | No | No | No | No | No | Yes | No | No | No | No | No |
| 28 | Volleyball | Yes | Yes | Yes | Yes | Yes | Yes | Yes | Yes | Yes | Yes | Yes | Yes | Yes |
Racquet Sports
| 29 | Badminton | No | No | No | No | No | No | No | Yes | Yes | Yes | Yes | Yes | Yes |
| 30 | Squash | No | No | No | No | No | No | No | Yes | No | No | No | No | No |
| 31 | Table Tennis | No | Yes | Yes | Yes | Yes | Yes | Yes | Yes | Yes | Yes | Yes | Yes | Yes |
| 32 | Tennis | Yes | Yes | Yes | Yes | Yes | Yes | Yes | Yes | Yes | Yes | Yes | Yes | Yes |
Other Sports
| 33 | Archery | No | No | No | No | No | No | No | No | No | No | No | Yes | No |
| 34 | Chess | No | No | No | No | No | No | No | Yes | Yes | Yes | No | Yes | Yes |
| 35 | Cue Sports (Snooker) | No | No | No | No | No | No | No | No | No | No | No | Yes | No |
| 36 | Diving | No | No | No | No | Dem | Yes | No | No | No | No | No | No | No |
| 37 | Equestrian | No | No | No | No | No | No | No | No | Yes | No | No | Yes | No |
| 38 | Petanque | No | No | No | No | No | No | No | No | No | No | No | Yes | No |
| 39 | Triathlon | No | No | No | No | No | No | No | No | No | Yes | No | Yes | Yes |
| 40 | Weightlifting | No | No | Yes | No | Yes | Yes | Yes | Yes | Yes | No | Yes | Yes | Yes |
Demonstration Sports
| 41 | Esports | No | No | No | No | No | No | No | No | No | No | No | No | Yes |
| 42 | Mixed martial arts | No | No | No | No | No | No | No | No | No | No | No | No | Yes |
| 43 | Nzango | No | No | No | No | No | No | No | No | No | No | Yes | No | No |
| 44 | Pharaoh Boxing | No | No | No | No | No | No | No | No | No | No | Yes | No | No |
| 45 | Pickleball | No | No | No | No | No | No | No | No | No | No | No | No | Yes |
| 46 | Scrabble | No | No | No | No | No | No | No | No | No | No | No | No | Yes |
| 47 | Speed-ball | No | No | No | No | No | No | No | No | No | No | No | No | Yes |
| 48 | Sambo | No | No | No | No | No | No | No | No | No | No | No | No | Yes |
| 49 | Teqball | No | No | No | No | No | No | No | No | No | No | No | No | Yes |
Para Sports ( from 2019 African Para Games )
| 50 | Para Athletics | No | No | No | No | No | No | No | Yes | Yes | Yes | Yes | No | No |
| 51 | Goalball | No | No | No | No | No | No | No | No | Yes | No | No | No | No |
| 52 | Para Powerlifting | No | No | No | No | No | No | No | Yes | No | No | Yes | No | No |
| 53 | Para Swimming | No | No | No | No | No | No | No | No | No | Yes | No | No | No |
| 54 | Para Table Tennis | No | No | No | No | No | No | No | Yes | No | No | No | No | No |
| 55 | Wheelchair Basketball | No | No | No | No | No | No | No | No | Yes | No | No | No | No |

== All time Medal table ==
50 nations have won at least a single medal in the African Games, from 54 National Olympic Committees participating throughout the history of the Games. 43 NOCs have won at least a single gold medal. Medal count updated as of the 2023 edition.

| No. | Nation | Games | Gold | Silver | Bronze | Total |
|---|---|---|---|---|---|---|
| 1 | Egypt (EGY) | 12 | 753 | 551 | 524 | 1828 |
| 2 | Nigeria (NGR) | 13 | 517 | 462 | 468 | 1447 |
| 3 | South Africa (RSA) | 8 | 429 | 394 | 334 | 1157 |
| 4 | Algeria (ALG) | 13 | 339 | 348 | 441 | 1128 |
| 5 | Tunisia (TUN) | 13 | 275 | 271 | 319 | 865 |
| 6 | Kenya (KEN) | 13 | 143 | 162 | 185 | 490 |
| 7 | Senegal (SEN) | 13 | 69 | 78 | 171 | 318 |
| 8 | Ghana (GHA) | 13 | 55 | 83 | 116 | 254 |
| 9 | Ethiopia (ETH) | 13 | 54 | 62 | 80 | 196 |
| 10 | Morocco (MAR) | 4 | 48 | 55 | 74 | 177 |

== Legacy ==
After hearing about the Pan-African Games whilst on a business trip to Congo, Soviet Union-Armenian diplomat Ashot Melik-Shahnazaryan got the idea to create the Pan-Armenian Games.

== See also ==
- Sport in Africa
- African Youth Games
- African School Games
- African Para Games
- All-Africa University Games
- Asian Games
  - South Asian Games
  - West Asian Games
  - Central Asian Games
  - Southeast Asian Games
- European Games
- Pacific Games
- Pan American Games
  - South American Games
