= Nigeria at the African Games =

- IOC code: NGR
- NOC: Nigerian Olympic Committee
- Medals: Gold 517 Silver 462 Bronze 468 Total 1,447

African Games appearances (overview)
- 1965; 1973; 1978; 1987; 1991; 1995; 1999; 2003; 2007; 2011; 2015; 2019; 2023; 2027

Youth appearances
- 2010

Nigeria has competed at every edition of the African Games. Its athletes have won a total of 1326 medals.

== Medals by Games ==
Below is a table representing all medals across the Games in which it has competed.

Games	Gold	Silver	Bronze	Total
1965	9	6	4	19
1973	18	25	20	63
1978	18	10	15	43
1987	23	16	21	60
1991	43	51	43	137
1995	36	31	40	107
1999	64	28	37	129
2003	85	90	65	240
2007	50	55	54	159
2011	31	28	39	98
2015	47	55	42	144
2019	46	33	48	127
2023	47	34	40	121
Totals (13 entries)	517	462	468	1,447

== See also ==
- Nigeria at the Olympics
- Nigeria at the Paralympics
- Sports in Nigeria
