= Zimbabwe at the African Games =

- IOC code: ZIM
- NOC: Zimbabwe Olympic Committee
- Medals: Gold 35 Silver 44 Bronze 81 Total 160

African Games appearances (overview)
- 1987; 1991; 1995; 1999; 2003; 2007; 2011; 2015; 2019; 2023

Zimbabwe started competing in the African Games since the 1987 All-Africa Games. Its athletes have won a total of 116 medals.

== See also ==
- Zimbabwe at the Olympics
- Zimbabwe at the Paralympics
- Sports in Zimbabwe

Below is a table representing all medals across the Games in which it has competed.

Games	Gold	Silver	Bronze	Total
1987	2	6	5	13
1991	8	3	13	24
1995	6	6	23	35
1999	1	10	13	24
2003	2	3	3	8
2007	7	8	8	23
2011	6	7	7	20
2015	3	0	6	9
2019	0	1	3	4
Totals (9 entries)	35	44	81	160
