= Egypt at the African Games =

- IOC code: EGY
- NOC: Egyptian Olympic Committee
- Medals Ranked 1st: Gold 753 Silver 551 Bronze 523 Total 1,827

African Games appearances (overview)
- 1965; 1973; 1978; 1987; 1991; 1995; 1999; 2003; 2007; 2011; 2015; 2019; 2023

Youth appearances
- 2010

Egypt has competed at every edition of the African Games. Its athletes have won a total of 1827 medals.

== Medals by Games ==
Below is a table representing all medals across the Games in which it has competed.

https://bestsports.com.br/db/cmppag.php?cmp=79&lang=2

https://bestsports.com.br/db/cmppaipag.php?cmp=79&pai=60&lang=2

Games	Gold	Silver	Bronze	Total
1965	17	10	3	30
1973	25	16	15	56
1987	31	22	20	73
1991	90	53	52	195
1995	61	43	50	154
1999	53	60	45	158
2003	80	62	72	214
2007	74	62	63	199
2011	32	14	20	66
2015	85	64	68	217
2019	102	98	73	273
2023	103	47	43	193
Totals (12 entries)	753	551	524	1,828

== See also ==
- Egypt at the Olympics
- Egypt at the Paralympics
- Egypt at the Mediterranean Games
- Sports in Egypt
