= South Africa at the African Games =

- IOC code: RSA
- NOC: South African Sports Confederation and Olympic Committee
- Medals Ranked 3rd: Gold 429 Silver 394 Bronze 334 Total 1,157

African Games appearances (overview)
- 1995; 1999; 2003; 2007; 2011; 2015; 2019; 2023; 2027

South Africa started competing in the African Games since the 1995 All-Africa Games. Its athletes have won a total of 1156 medals.

== Medals by Games ==
Below is a table representing all medals across the Games in which it has competed.

Nation	Gold	Silver	Bronze	Total
1999	71	64	49	184
1995	64	51	39	154
2003	63	59	49	171
2007	61	66	53	180
2011	61	55	40	156
2015	41	41	37	119
2019	36	26	25	87
2023	32	32	42	106
Totals (8 entries)	429	394	334	1,157

== See also ==
- South Africa at the Olympics
- South Africa at the Paralympics
- Sports in South Africa
