= 1978 All-Africa Games =

Multi-sport event in Algiers, Algeria

III All-Africa Games
- Host city: Algiers, Algeria
- Nations: 45
- Athletes: 3000
- Events: 12 sports
- Opening: 13 July 1978
- Closing: 28 July 1978
- Opened by: Houari Boumediene
- Main venue: Stade 5 Juillet 1962

The 3rd All-Africa Games (Arabic: الألعاب الأفريقية الثالثة; French: 3e Jeux africains), also known as Algiers 1978 (الجزائر 1978) was a multi-sport event played from 13 to 28 July 1978, in Algiers, Algeria. 45 countries from 49 independent African countries participated in twelve sports.

At the closing ceremonies the torch was passed to Nairobi, Kenya to begin preparations for the IVth All-Africa Games in 1987. After the games, Morocco boycotted the competition following the recognition of Sahrawi Arab Democratic Republic by the AU until 2019.

== The games ==
=== Opening ceremony ===
The opening ceremony officially began on July 13, 1978. It was organized by Mohamed Zerguini, president of the Algerian Olympic Committee and member of the International Olympic Committee. It was attended by Lord Killanin (president of the International Olympic Committee), Mohamed Mzali (vice-president of the IOC), Masaji Kiyokawa (Vice Chairman of the IOC), the French Count Jean de Beaumont, the IOC executive members Juan Antonio Samaranch, Mohamed Benjelloun, Lamine Keita, Mohamed Abel Halim and other members and 45 presidents or representatives of the African National Olympic Committees. And finally Ignaty Novikov president of the Organizing Committees of the Olympic Games accompanied with representatives of Organizing Committees of the 1979 Mediterranean Games in Split.

=== Closing ceremony ===
At the conclusion of the Games it was known where the next games would be held as Nairobi had come forth to offer to hold the Games in 1987.

=== Stars of the games ===
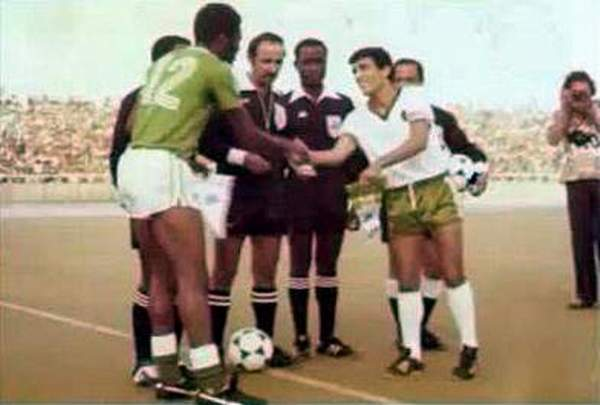
Algeria vs Nigeria in the final match of the football tournament in Algiers. Algeria won the final.

Henry Rono, the Kenyan star who had already set four world records on the track in 1978 won the 10,000 meters and 3000 meters steeplechase. Filbert Bayi again took the 1500 meters gold medal. The Algeria national football team wins the gold medal of the games against Nigeria, Ghana wins the bronze medal.

== Participating nations ==
The following is a list of nations that participated in the 1978 All-Africa Games:

- Algeria (265)
- Cameroon
- Chad
- Republic of the Congo
- Ivory Coast
- Egypt
- Ethiopia
- Gabon
- Ghana
- Guinea
- Kenya
- Libya
- Malawi
- Morocco
- Nigeria
- Senegal
- Sudan
- Swaziland
- Tanzania
- Togo
- Tunisia
- Uganda
- Upper Volta
- Zaire
- Zambia

Somalia participated in the games, but not mentioned.

== Sports ==
- Athletics
- Basketball
- Boxing
- Cycling
- Football
- Handball
- Judo
- Swimming
- Table tennis
- Tennis
- Volleyball
- Wrestling

== Medal table ==
* Host nation (Algeria)

| Rank | Nation | Gold | Silver | Bronze | Total |
|---|---|---|---|---|---|
| 1 | Tunisia (TUN) | 29 | 14 | 20 | 63 |
| 2 | Nigeria (NGR) | 18 | 10 | 15 | 43 |
| 3 | Algeria (ALG)* | 16 | 19 | 23 | 58 |
| 4 | Kenya (KEN) | 11 | 8 | 8 | 27 |
| 5 | Morocco (MAR) | 7 | 8 | 11 | 26 |
| 6 | Ghana (GHA) | 4 | 4 | 7 | 15 |
| 7 | Libya (LBA) | 4 | 3 | 5 | 12 |
| 8 | Senegal (SEN) | 4 | 2 | 4 | 10 |
| 9 | Uganda (UGA) | 3 | 6 | 5 | 14 |
| 10 | Ivory Coast (CIV) | 2 | 3 | 4 | 9 |
| 11 | Zambia (ZAM) | 2 | 0 | 2 | 4 |
| 12 | Sudan (SUD) | 2 | 0 | 0 | 2 |
| 13 | Mali (MLI) | 1 | 1 | 0 | 2 |
| 14 | Chad (CHA) | 1 | 0 | 0 | 1 |
| 14 | Swaziland (SWZ) | 1 | 0 | 0 | 1 |
| 16 | Cameroon (CMR) | 0 | 4 | 4 | 8 |
| 17 | Togo (TOG) | 0 | 1 | 4 | 5 |
| 18 | Ethiopia (ETH) | 0 | 1 | 2 | 3 |
| 19 | Tanzania (TAN) | 0 | 1 | 1 | 2 |
| 19 | Upper Volta (VOL) | 0 | 1 | 1 | 2 |
| 21 | Gabon (GAB) | 0 | 0 | 1 | 1 |
| Totals (21 entries) | | 105 | 86 | 117 | 308 |

== Results ==
=== Athletics ===
Malian discus thrower Namakoro Niaré won his third title, being the only athlete to do so. Four athletes, two male and two female, won more than one event:

- El Kashief Hassan, Sudan (200 metres and 400 metres)
- Hannah Afriyie, Ghana (100 metres and 200 metres)
- Charlton Ehizuelen, Nigeria (long jump and triple jump)
- Modupe Oshikoya, Nigeria (high jump and long jump)
- Nagui Asaad, Egypt, won his second Gold medal in Shot Put of the All Africa Games in 1978, Algeria, after his first in 1973, Nigeria.

Some new events were added: Decathlon and pentathlon, for men and women respectively, as well as men's 20 km road walk.

=== Football ===
The football tournament was won by the host country Algeria.

| Gold: | Silver: | Bronze: |
|---|---|---|
| Algeria Coach: | Nigeria Coach: | Ghana Coach: |

== Concerns and controversies ==
=== Egyptian incident ===
The Egyptian team, which had topped the medals table in the previous two games was called home by its government midway through the games after a brawl marred the football tournament. A fight between Libyans and Egyptians began at the end of the match after a Libyan player struck his opponent. The field became a ring between the players and leaders on both sides. It was reported that Algerian police did stop the violence. Live television broadcast the melee to Egypt. Egypt decided, as a result of these incidents, to withdraw from the competition and the Egyptian Prime minister called the team home immediately.

=== The meeting of Algiers ===
The meeting gave those African nations associated with the Commonwealth a chance to address another brewing controversy; their proposed boycott of the 1978 Commonwealth Games which were to be held the following month in Edmonton, Canada. The discussions were fruitful and the boycott was not carried out.
