= 1973 All-Africa Games =

Multi-sport event in Lagos, Nigeria

II All-Africa Games
- Host city: Lagos, Nigeria
- Nations: 36
- Opening: 7 January 1973
- Closing: 18 January 1973
- Opened by: Yakubu Gowon
- Main venue: National Stadium

The 2nd All-Africa Games, also known as Lagos 1973, were played from 7 to 18 January 1973, in Lagos, Nigeria.

After the success of the first African Games, the organizing bodies awarded the second games to Bamako, Mali to be held in 1969. A military coup disrupted the plans and the organizers moved the Games to Lagos, Nigeria to be held in 1971. The Games were postponed once again and finally opened in January 1973. A torch was lit in Brazzaville a week before the Games and transported to Lagos as a symbol of the continuity of the Games.

Security again was very tight at the Games. This time in response to the massacre of Israeli athletes at the Munich Olympic Games just four months earlier.

Sports heroes from around the world including Abebe Bikila, Pelé, Muhammad Ali, and Jesse Owens were invited to attend the opening ceremonies.

Ben Jipcho, Kenya's 3000 metre silver medalist at the Munich Olympics, tied the world record in the steeplechase with a run of 8:20.8. Tanzania's newcomer Filbert Bayi stunned the veteran favorite Kip Keino in the 1500 metres in 3:37.18.

African nations continued to put pressure on South Africa which was not invited to participate due to their apartheid policies. Rhodesia was also not invited.

At the closing ceremonies the torch was passed to Algiers, Algeria to begin preparations for the IIIrd All-Africa Games in 1978.

== Medal table ==
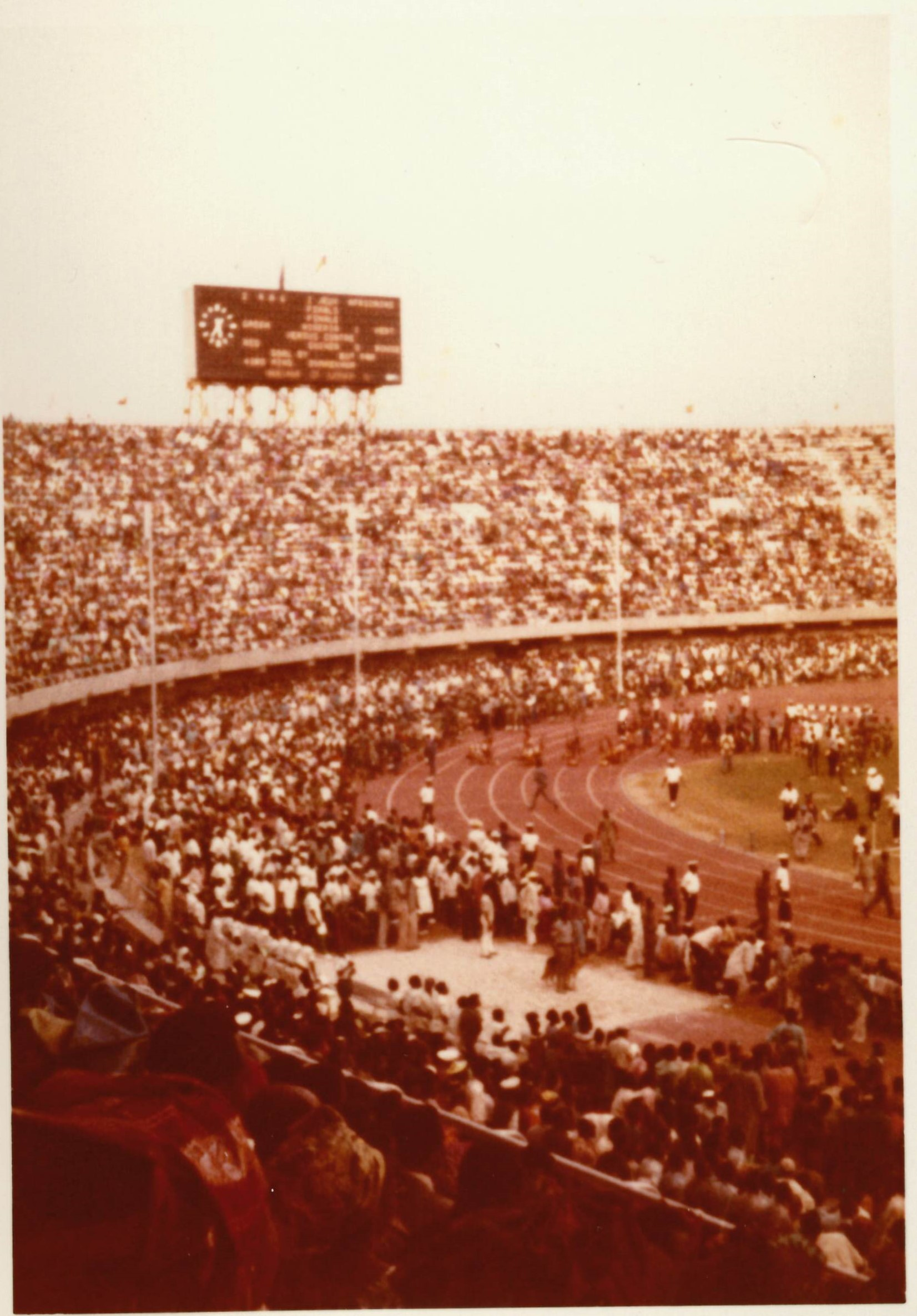
1973 All-African Games

* Host nation (Nigeria)

Rank	Nation	Gold	Silver	Bronze	Total
1	Egypt (EGY)	25	16	15	56
2	Nigeria (NGR)*	18	25	20	63
3	Kenya (KEN)	9	9	18	36
4	Uganda (UGA)	8	6	6	20
5	Ghana (GHA)	7	7	13	27
6	Tunisia (TUN)	4	6	3	13
7	Algeria (ALG)	4	5	13	22
8	Ethiopia (ETH)	4	3	6	13
9	Senegal (SEN)	4	2	6	12
10	Ivory Coast (CIV)	2	0	4	6
11	Morocco (MAR)	1	3	3	7
12	Sudan (SUD)	1	1	1	3
13	Guinea (GUI)	1	1	0	2
13	Mali (MLI)	1	1	0	2
13	Tanzania (TAN)	1	1	0	2
16	Zambia (ZAM)	1	0	6	7
17	Somalia (SOM)	1	0	0	1
18	Madagascar (MAD)	0	2	3	5
19	Cameroon (CMR)	0	1	3	4
19	Congo (CGO)	0	1	3	4
21	Gambia (GAM)	0	1	0	1
21	Niger (NIG)	0	1	0	1
23	Benin (BEN)	0	0	1	1
23	Eswatini (SWZ)	0	0	1	1
23	Togo (TOG)	0	0	1	1
Totals (25 entries)		92	92	126	310

== Athletics ==
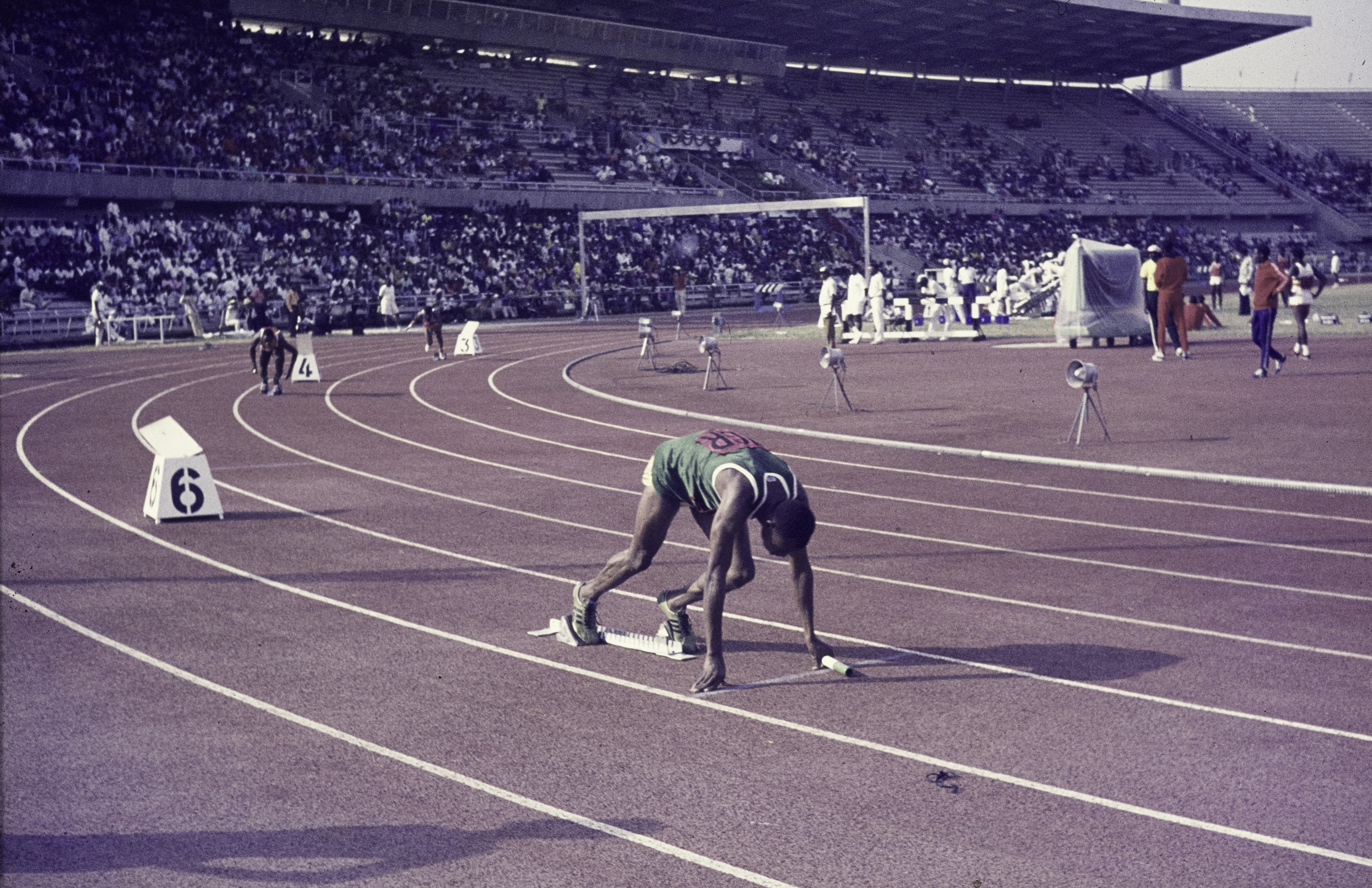
Running at the 1973 All-Africa Games

Malian discus thrower Namakoro Niaré was the only athlete to defend his title from the 1965 Games. Three athletes, one male and two female, won more than one event:

- Ohene Karikari, Ghana (100 metres and 200 metres men)
- Alice Annum, Ghana (100 metres and 200 metres women)
- Modupe Oshikoya, Nigeria (high jump, long jump and 100m hurdles)
- Adegboyega Sunday Olorife, Nigeria (Youngest athlete to represent Nigeria at age 15 in 1973, known for his impressive performance in the water polo, and backstroke events)

Several women's events was added. These were 200 metres, 400 metres, 800 metres, 1500 metres, discus throw, shot put and 4 x 400 metres relay.

- Nagui Asaad won his first gold medal in shot put at this edition of the Games, and then he went on to win a second time at the 1978 edition in Algeria. He also won the discus throw silver medal at the 1973 edition of the Games.

== Football ==
The football tournament was won by the host country Nigeria.

The athletics competitions at the 1973 All-African Games were held on the first synthetic (plastic) running track ever installed in Africa.

This marked an important milestone in the development of modern athletics infrastructure on the continent. The synthetic track surface was manufactured and installed by the German company AKUS Kunststoff-Sportbau GmbH from Hüttenfeld, Germany.

At the time, the company was owned and managed by its director Hans Kohl.

Event	Gold	Silver	Bronze
Football	Nigeria	Guinea	Egypt
