= 1987 All-Africa Games =

Multi-sport event in Nairobi, Kenya

IV All-Africa Games
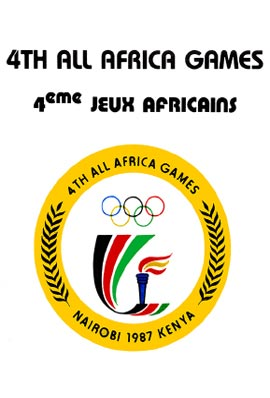
- Logo of the VI All-Africa Games
- Host city: Nairobi, Kenya
- Nations: 42
- Events: 14 sports
- Opening: 1 August 1987
- Closing: 12 August 1987
- Opened by: Daniel arap Moi
- Main venue: Kasarani Stadium

The 4th All-Africa Games (Swahili: Michezo ya 4 ya Afrika Nzima), also known as Nairobi 1987, were played from 1 to 12 August 1987, in Nairobi, Kenya. 42 countries participated in fourteen sports.

From the beginning the intent had been to hold the African Games every four years. Economic difficulties and general civil unrest had never allowed this to happen. The fourth Games were no exception. Originally scheduled for 1982, a weak Kenyan economy slowed preparations. The Chinese helped provide the necessary funds and manpower to begin building Kasarani Stadium, but too late to hold the games on schedule. It was suggested at one time that Tunis, Tunisia host the fourth games in 1982 and Nairobi instead host the fifth edition of the games in 1986. This proposal was voted down, but the schedule for the Nairobi games was pushed back to 1986. This was still not enough time for the Kenyans to ready themselves and the games finally opened in August 1987. The Games have kept to the four-year schedule since this edition.

A torch was relayed from Nairobi to the Kenyan coast, the Kenyan highlands and back to Nairobi where World Champion John Ngugi carried it into the stadium in front of an enthusiastic crowd of 80,000.

Organizational difficulties with housing and facilities, typical in events such as these, were evident in the Nairobi Games as well, but in the end the Games concluded without undue calamity.

Egypt won the soccer final against the hosts Kenya on the final day, and again topped the medals table.

At the closing ceremony, the torch was passed to Cairo, Egypt to begin preparations for the fifth All-Africa Games in 1991.

== Medal table ==
* Host nation (Kenya)

Rank	Nation	Gold	Silver	Bronze	Total
1	Egypt	31	22	20	73
2	Tunisia	28	26	22	76
3	Nigeria	23	16	21	60
4	Kenya*	22	25	16	63
5	Algeria	13	23	23	59
6	Senegal	7	2	12	21
7	Ethiopia	3	5	4	12
8	Ghana	3	3	1	7
9	Uganda	3	2	4	9
10	Zimbabwe	2	5	6	13
11	Madagascar	2	4	2	8
12	Cameroon	1	1	7	9
13	Ivory Coast	1	1	2	4
14	Zaire	1	1	0	2
15	Mauritius	1	0	2	3
16	Tanzania	0	2	5	7
17	Congo	0	2	0	2
18	Rwanda	0	1	0	1
19	Zambia	0	0	3	3
20	Seychelles	0	0	2	2
21	Angola	0	0	1	1
21	Burundi	0	0	1	1
21	Chad	0	0	1	1
21	Malawi	0	0	1	1
21	Mozambique	0	0	1	1
Totals (25 entries)		141	141	157	439

== Sports ==
=== Athletics ===
Three athletes, two female and one male, won more than one event:

- Selina Chirchir, Kenya (800 metres and 1500 metres)
- Maria Usifo, Nigeria (100 m hurdles and 400 m hurdles)
- Adewale Olukoju, Nigeria (shot put and discus throw)

In addition, Nigeria won all four relay races; 4×100 metres and 4×400 metres for men and for women.

Some new women's events were added: 3000 metres, 10000 metres, 400 metres hurdles and 5000 metres track walk. Additionally, the obsoleted pentathlon event was replaced by the heptathlon.

=== Basketball ===
- Men: 1. Angola, 2. Senegal
- Women: 1. Zaire

=== Field hockey ===
Field hockey was part of the games for the first time. The venue was City Park Hockey Stadium.

- Men: 1. Kenya, 2. Zimbabwe, 3. Egypt, 4. Ghana, 5. Tanzania, 7. Zambia

=== Football ===
The football tournament was won by Egypt. It was the first Games in which the host country did not win, although the host Kenya finished second. Malawi won their first All-Africa medal.

Gold:	Silver:	Bronze:
Egypt Coach:	Kenya Coach: Reinhard Fabisch	Malawi Coach: Reuben Malola

=== Handball ===
- Men: 1. Algeria, 2. Congo, 3. Egypt
- Women: 1. Cote d'Ivoire, 2. Congo, 3. Cameroon

=== Taekwondo ===
The taekwondo competition took place at Desai Memorial Hall between August 1 and August 4, 1987. The men's winners were:

Weight	Winner	Nationality
Fin	Anthony Mensah	Ghana
Fly	John Kariuki	Kenya
Bantam	John Phafoli	Lesotho
Feather	Molise Tau	Lesotho
Light	Dominic Kim	Nigeria
Welter	Osborne Kunenei	Swaziland
Middle	Anthony Ilukhor	Nigeria
Heavy	Pius Ilukhor	Nigeria

=== Volleyball ===
- Men: 1. Cameroon, 2. Algeria, 3. Nigeria
- Women: 1. Egypt, 2. Kenya, 3. Mauritius
