= 1991 All-Africa Games =

Multi-sport event in Cairo, Egypt

V All-Africa Games
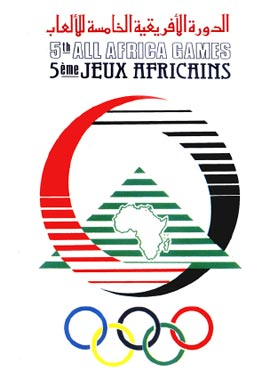
- Logo of the 5th All-Africa Games
- Host city: Cairo, Egypt
- Nations: 43
- Events: 18 sports
- Opening: 20 September 1991
- Closing: 1 October 1991
- Opened by: Hosni Mubarak
- Main venue: Cairo International Stadium

The 5th All-Africa Games (Arabic: الألعاب الإفريقية الخامس), also known as Cairo 1991 (القاهرة 1991), were held from September 20 to October 1, 1991, in Cairo, Egypt. Forty-three countries participated in eighteen sports.

For the first time the Games were held on a four-year cycle as planned. Egypt had hoped to use the Games to showcase the city of Cairo for a possible Olympic bid. The plan fell through after organizational difficulties once again plagued the Games. A stampede of spectators trying to get in to see the Opening Ceremonies got the Games off to a bad start. Many IOC officials and dignitaries were unable to make it into the stadium in the confusion and returned to their hotels to watch the ceremony on television.

African athletes had claimed seven world championships at the previous month's World Athletics Championships. Only one, steeplechaser Moses Kiptanui, decided to participate in Cairo.

Highly partisan crowds, which were granted free admission to the events by the Egyptian government, filled the stadiums throughout the games, cheering the home team to another placing at the top of the medals table.

It was Namibia's first participation in the world arena. The team returned with four gold medals, two silver medals and seven bronze medals.

== Participating sports ==
- Athletics
- Basketball
- Boxing
- Cycling
- Football
- Gymnastics
- Handball
- Hockey
- Judo
- Karate
- Shooting
- Swimming
- Table tennis
- Taekwondo
- Tennis
- Volleyball
- Weightlifting
- Wrestling

== Medal table ==
* Host nation (Egypt)

Rank	Nation	Gold	Silver	Bronze	Total
1	Egypt (EGY)*	90	53	52	195
2	Algeria (ALG)	49	36	34	119
3	Nigeria (NGR)	43	51	43	137
4	Kenya (KEN)	13	17	18	48
5	Zimbabwe (ZIM)	8	3	13	24
6	Tunisia (TUN)	6	4	10	20
7	Ivory Coast (CIV)	4	5	3	12
8	Ethiopia (ETH)	4	3	5	12
9	Namibia (NAM)	4	2	6	12
10	Senegal (SEN)	3	4	11	18
11	Ghana (GHA)	2	4	6	12
12	Angola (ANG)	2	3	5	10
13	Mozambique (MOZ)	2	0	0	2
14	Mauritius (MRI)	1	5	6	12
15	Cameroon (CMR)	1	4	10	15
16	Tanzania (TAN)	1	3	1	5
17	Uganda (UGA)	1	1	2	4
18	Gabon (GAB)	1	0	3	4
18	Zambia (ZAM)	1	0	3	4
20	Lesotho (LES)	0	3	3	6
21	Madagascar (MAD)	0	2	9	11
22	Libya (LBA)	0	1	5	6
23	Seychelles (SEY)	0	1	2	3
24	Central African Republic (CAF)	0	1	0	1
24	Sierra Leone (SLE)	0	1	0	1
26	Burkina Faso (BUR)	0	0	2	2
26	Zaire (ZAI)	0	0	2	2
28	Botswana (BOT)	0	0	1	1
28	Congo (CGO)	0	0	1	1
28	Swaziland (SWZ)	0	0	1	1
Totals (30 entries)		236	207	257	700

== Athletics ==
Three athletes, two female and one male, won more than one event:

- Frankie Fredericks, Namibia (100 metres and 200 metres)
- Susan Sirma, Kenya (1500 metres and 3000 metres)
- Hanan Ahmed Khaled, Egypt (shot put and discus throw)

In addition, Nigeria won three of the four relay races; 4x100 metres for men and women as well as women's 4x400 metres. No new events were added.

== Field hockey ==
- Men: 1. Egypt, 2. Kenya, 3. Zimbabwe, 4. Ghana, 5. Nigeria

== Soccer ==
The soccer tournament was transformed to a U-23 competition. It was won by Cameroon, and it was the first Games in which the host country did not win a medal.

The final was played on 30 September 1991, where Cameroon won against Tunisia (1-0). Nigeria won the third-place match on the same day against Zimbabwe (3-0).

Gold:	Silver:	Bronze:
Cameroon Coach:	Tunisia Coach:	Nigeria Coach:
