= 1995 All-Africa Games =

Multi-sport event in Harare, Zimbabwe

VI All-Africa Games
- Official logo of the Games
- Host city: Harare, Zimbabwe
- Nations: 46
- Events: 17 sports
- Opening: 13 September
- Closing: 23 September
- Opened by: Robert Mugabe
- Main venue: National Sports Stadium

The 6th All-Africa Games, also known as Harare 1995, were held from 13 to 23 September 1995 in Harare, Zimbabwe. 46 countries participated in eighteen sports.

South Africa, having previously been banned from competition by the other African nations, was invited to the games for the first time after the fall of the Apartheid regime.

With a record 6,000 athletes participating in the games, the event was in danger of growing unmanageable. The then president of the International Olympic Committee, the Spaniard Juan Antonio Samaranch expressed concern over the dizzying growth of the event in just 4 years, asking the organizers of the next editions to avoid applying the same scale of the Summer Olympics.

Petty controversy again entered the games. An Egyptian woman handball player was accused of being a man and the Egyptian team protested that the lace sleeves worn by the South African gymnasts were too "sexy".

Mozambique's World Champion 800 meter runner Maria de Lurdes Mutola won her specialty in Harare.

Of the 17 sports on the program, 8 were open to participation by women: athletics, basketball, gymnastics, handball, swimming, table tennis, tennis and volleyball. Women's diving and netball were to be included but were reduced to demonstration sports due to a lack of entries.

At the closing ceremonies the torch was passed to Johannesburg, South Africa to begin preparations for the VIIth All-Africa Games in 1999.

== Medal table ==
* Host nation (Zimbabwe)

Rank	Nation	Gold	Silver	Bronze	Total
1	South Africa (SAF)	64	51	39	154
2	Egypt (EGY)	61	43	50	154
3	Nigeria (NGR)	36	31	40	107
4	Algeria (ALG)	15	16	26	57
5	Kenya (KEN)	12	11	17	40
6	Tunisia (TUN)	9	11	19	39
7	Zimbabwe (ZIM)*	6	6	23	35
8	Senegal (SEN)	5	4	6	15
9	Cameroon (CMR)	3	13	10	26
10	Mauritius (MRI)	3	6	9	18
11	Madagascar (MAD)	2	2	5	9
12	Gabon (GAB)	2	0	6	8
13	Ethiopia (ETH)	1	5	6	12
14	Ghana (GHA)	1	4	2	7
15	Mozambique (MOZ)	1	2	0	3
16	Sierra Leone (SLE)	1	1	0	2
17	Tanzania (TAN)	1	0	1	2
18	Burundi (BDI)	1	0	0	1
19	Namibia (NAM)	0	4	3	7
20	Ivory Coast (CIV)	0	4	2	6
21	Zambia (ZAM)	0	2	2	4
22	Lesotho (LES)	0	1	2	3
22	Seychelles (SEY)	0	1	2	3
24	Burkina Faso (BUR)	0	1	0	1
24	Central African Republic (CAF)	0	1	0	1
24	Guinea (GUI)	0	1	0	1
24	Libya (LBA)	0	1	0	1
24	Mali (MLI)	0	1	0	1
29	Angola (ANG)	0	0	3	3
29	Eswatini (SWZ)	0	0	3	3
31	Uganda (UGA)	0	0	2	2
32	Botswana (BOT)	0	0	1	1
32	Congo (CGO)	0	0	1	1
Totals (33 entries)		224	223	280	727

== Athletics ==
Discus thrower Adewale Olukoju and sprinter Mary Onyali became the first athletes to win four All-Africa gold medals. Onyali won the 100 and 200 metres races, and together with Josphat Machuka, Kenya (5,000 metres and 10,000 metres) they became the only athletes to win more than one event.

In addition, Nigeria won three of the four relay races; 4x400 metres for men and women as well as men's 4x100 metres.

Some new women's events were added: 5000 metres, marathon and triple jump.

== Field hockey ==
- Men: 1. South Africa, 2. Egypt, 3. Kenya, 4. Zimbabwe, 5. Nigeria, 6. Namibia
- Women. 1. South Africa, 2. Zimbabwe, 3. Kenya, 4. Namibia, 5. Nigeria, 6. Ghana

== Football ==
The football tournament was won by Egypt, who became the first team to win this tournament twice.

Gold:	Silver:	Bronze:
Egypt Coach:	Zimbabwe Coach:	Nigeria Coach:
