= Femme (disambiguation) =

Femme refers to a type of lesbian culture.

Femme or La Femme may also refer to:

== Places ==
- Femme, Newfoundland and Labrador, a place in Canada
- La Femme (beach), a women-only beach in Egypt
- Femme Bar, Worcester, Massachusetts, US

== People with the name ==
- Laura Bettinson, British musician whose stage name is "FEMME"
- Magda Femme, Polish pop singer
- Femme Gaastra Dutch historian
- Femme Schmidt, German musician and singer

== Arts, entertainment, and media ==
- Kamen Rider Femme, a character in the Kamen Rider series
- La Femme (band), a French band
- La Femme (TV series), a television series in Singapore
- La Femme (magazine), a French magazine (1879–1937)
- Femme (film), 2023 British thriller film

== Other uses ==
- Dodge La Femme, a 1955 American automobile

== See also ==
- Femke, Dutch feminine given name and derived from Femme
