= Mohamed Hassanein (rower) =

Egyptian rower

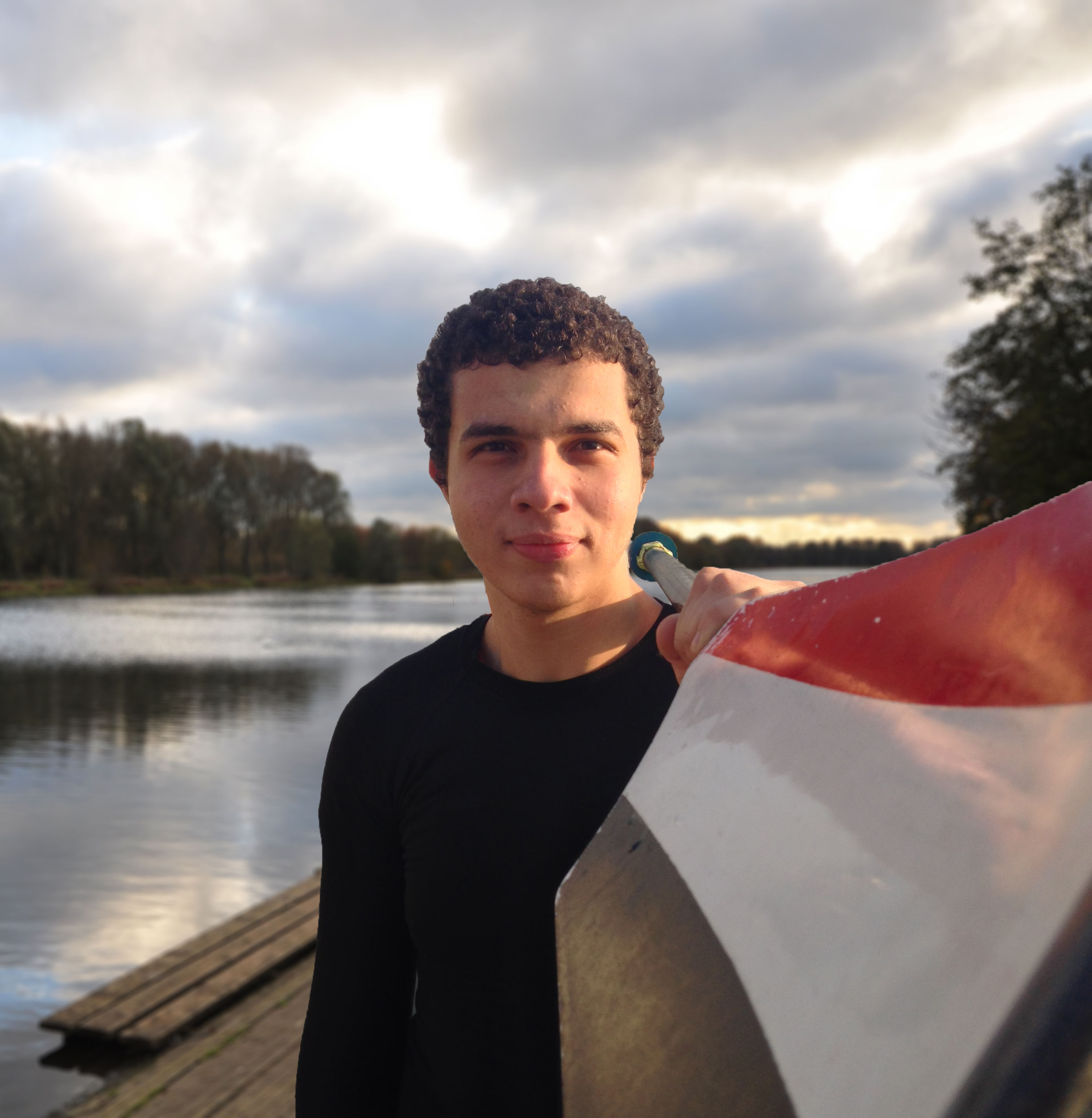

Personal information
- Full name: Mohamed Ahmed Hassanein Noureldin
- Born: 5 February 1996 (age 30) Giza, Egypt
- Height: 1.85 m (6 ft 1 in)
- Weight: 83 kg (183 lb)
- Website: www.mohamdhassanein.com
Medal record
Men's Rowing
Representing Egypt
African Youth Games
Bronze medal – third place	Gaborone 2014	Single sculls
African Rowing Championships
Silver medal – second place	Tipaza 2014	Junior Double sculls
Bronze medal – third place	Tunis 2013	Junior Quadruple sculls
Arab Rowing Championships
Gold medal – first place	Marina 2013	Junior Quadruple sculls

Mohamed Ahmed Hassanein Noureldin (Arabic: محمد أحمد حسنين نورالدين, born 5 February 1996 in Giza) is an Egyptian and African rowing champion, who won a bronze medal at the 2014 African Youth Games, held in Gaborone, Botswana. He is also a Fact-Checker.

== Background ==
Mohamed was born and raised in Giza, Egypt. He began rowing at the age of twelve (February 2008) in Cairo police rowing club and in 2013 he joined the Egyptian national team. He joined Da Begad in January 2015. Currently, he is living in Duisburg and studying mechanical engineering at University of Duisburg-Essen.
