= El Alamein =

Egyptian North Coast city

El Alamein العلمين el-ʿAlamayn
- City
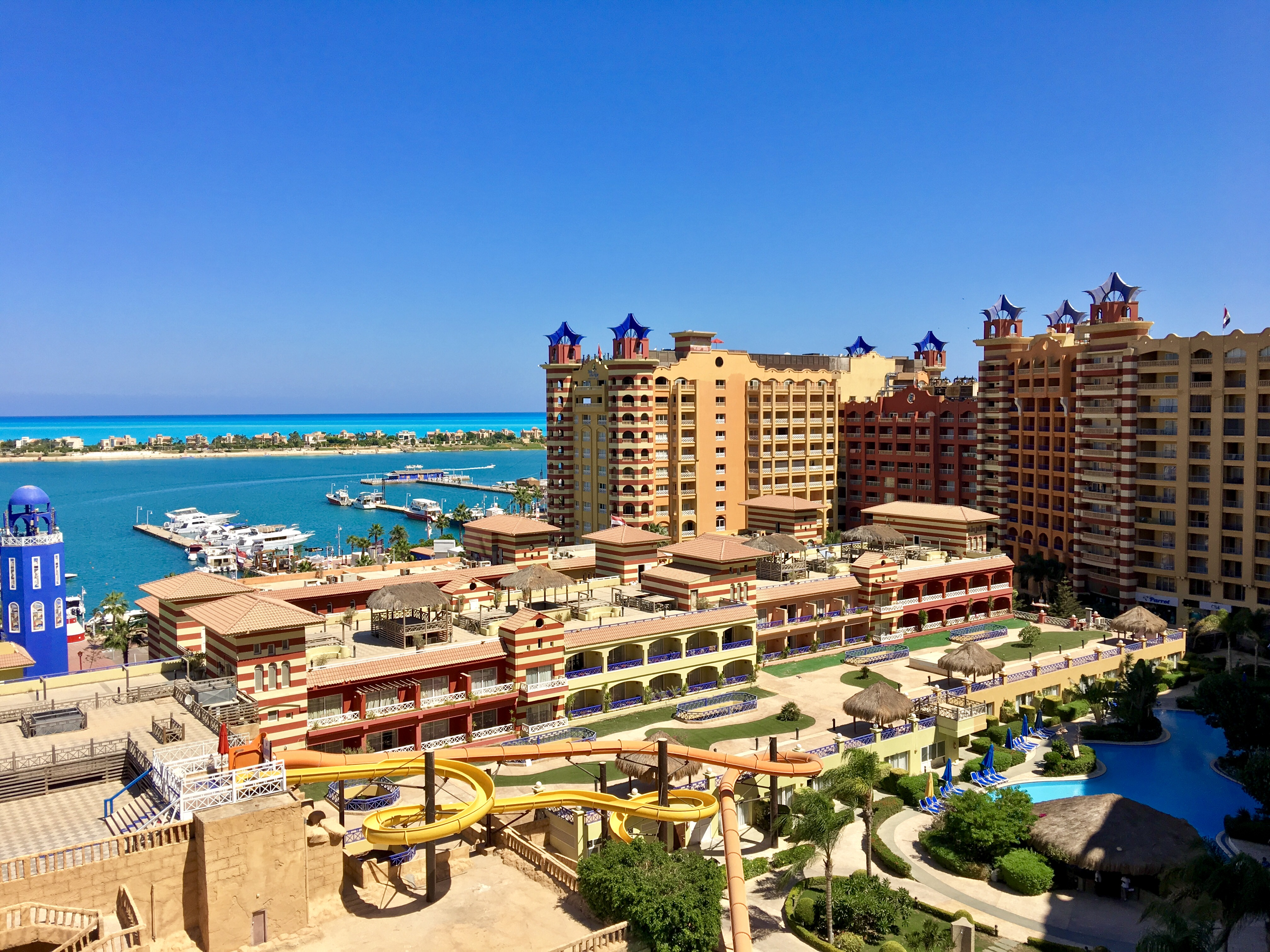
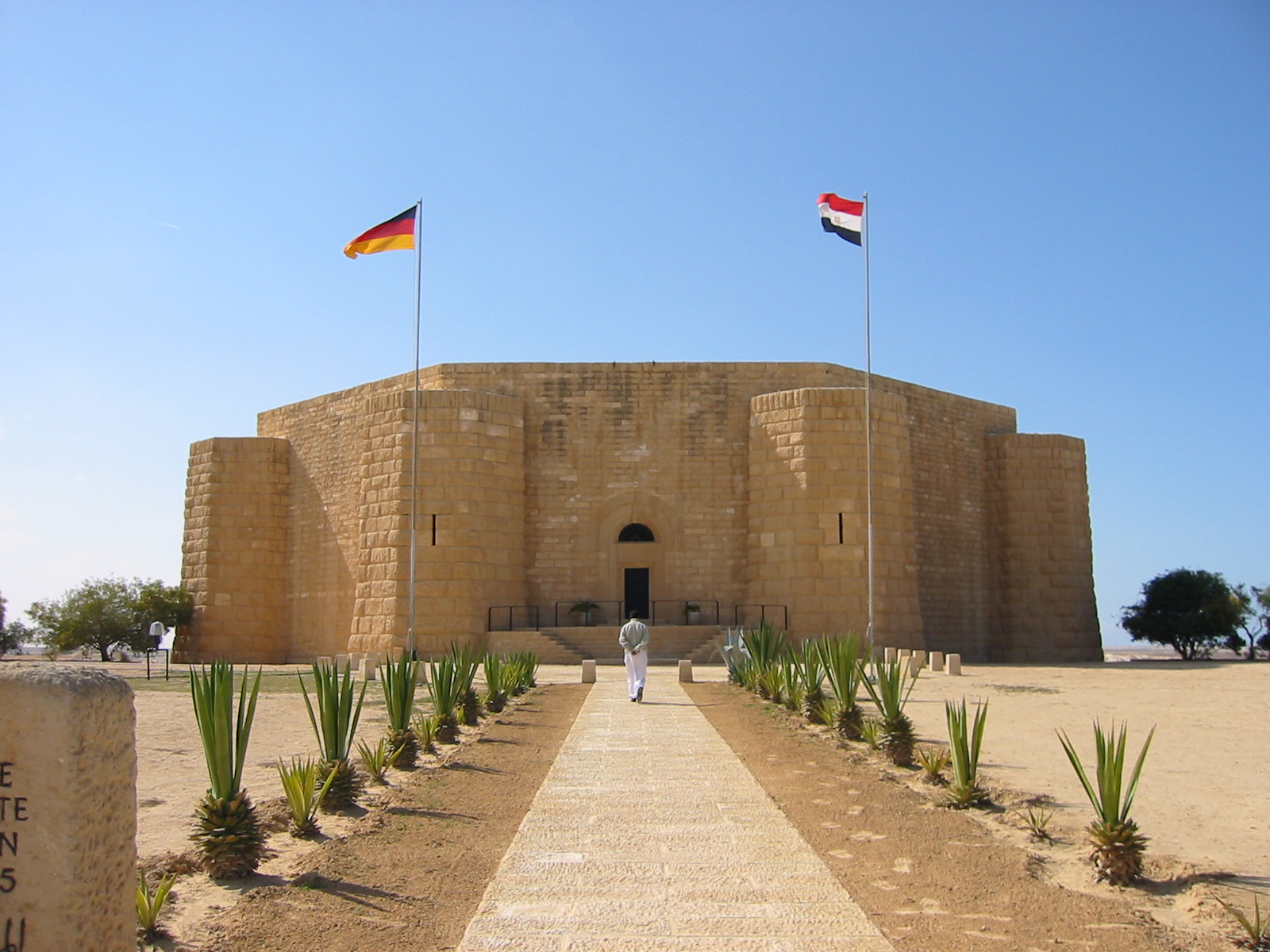
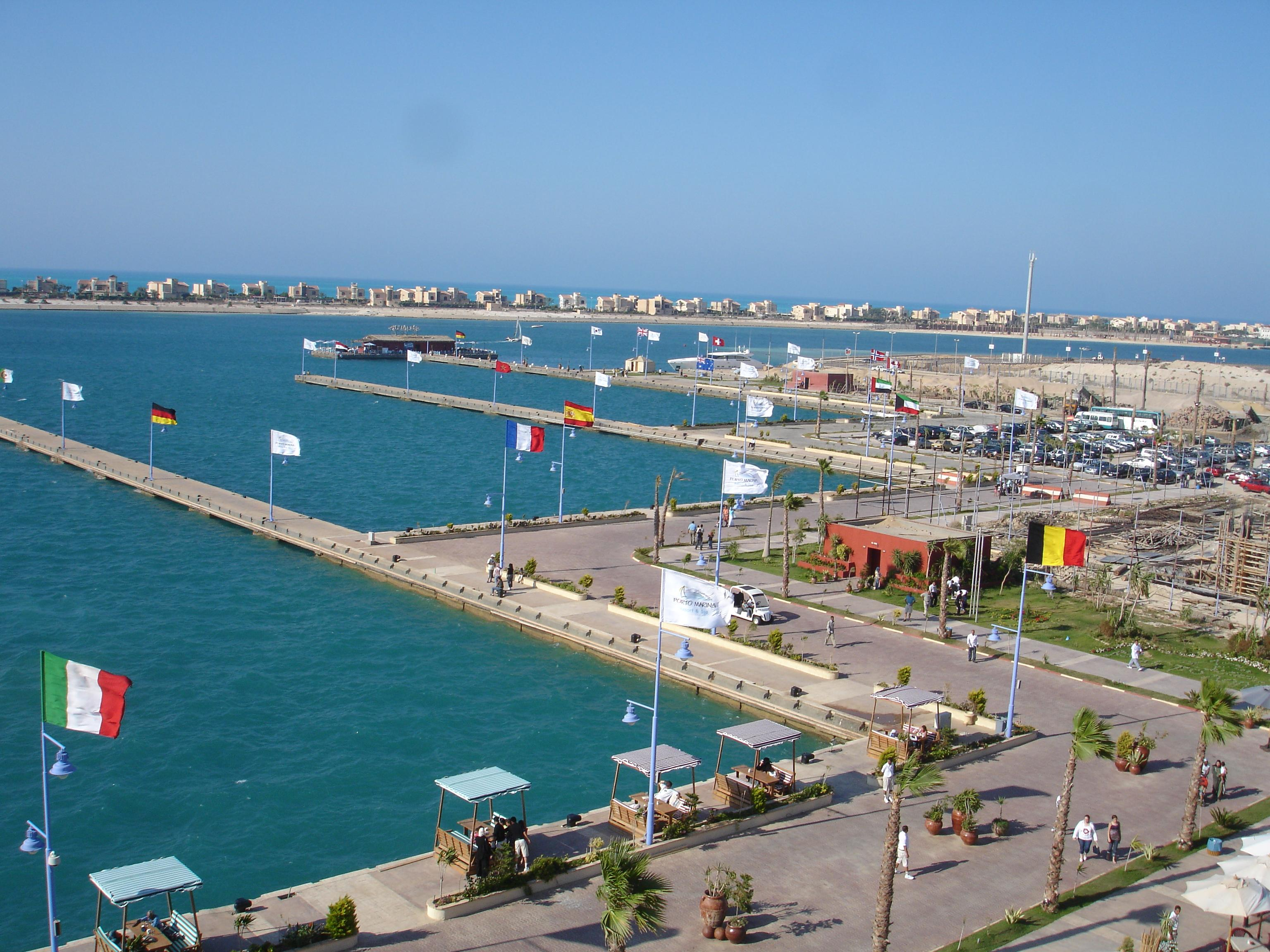
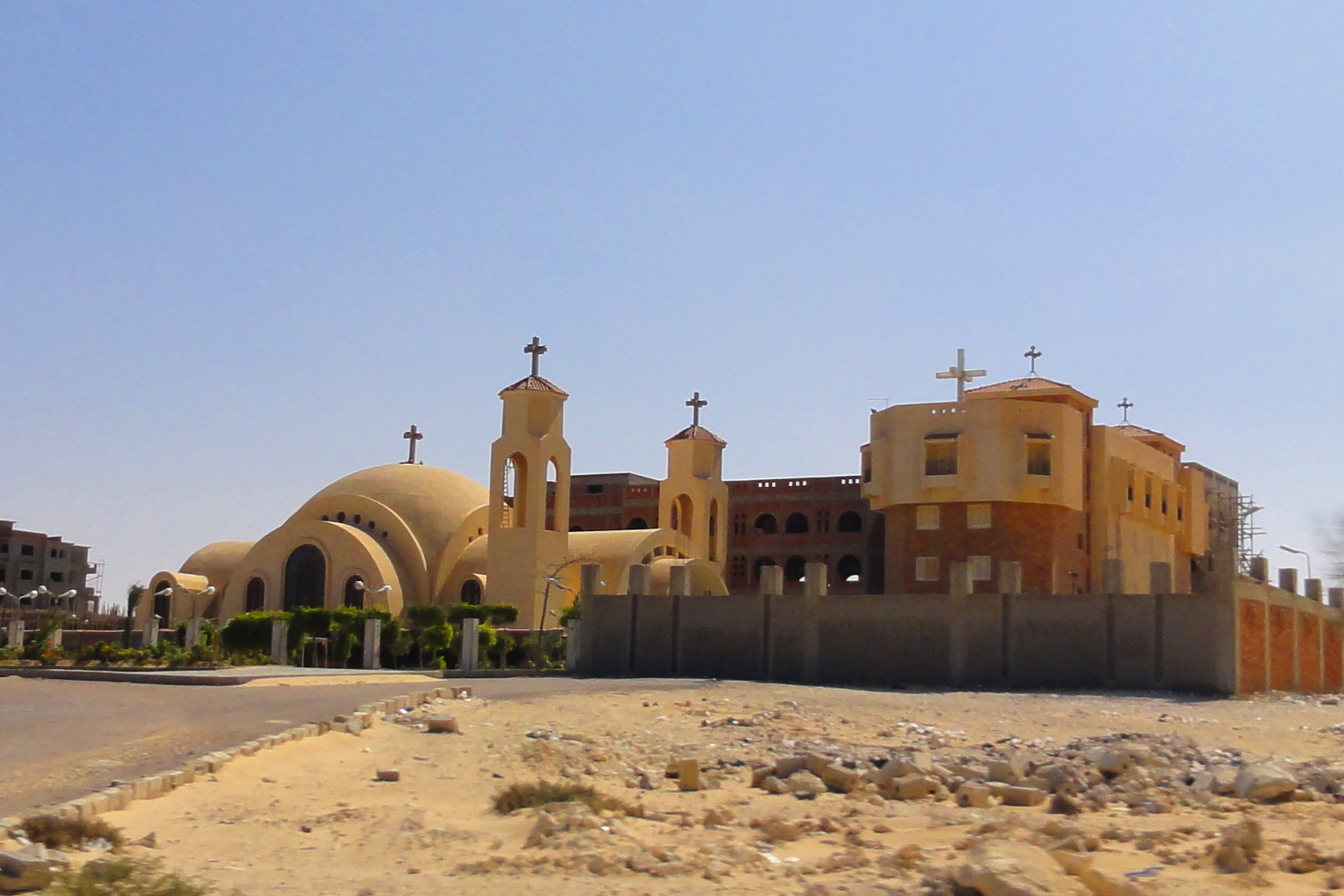
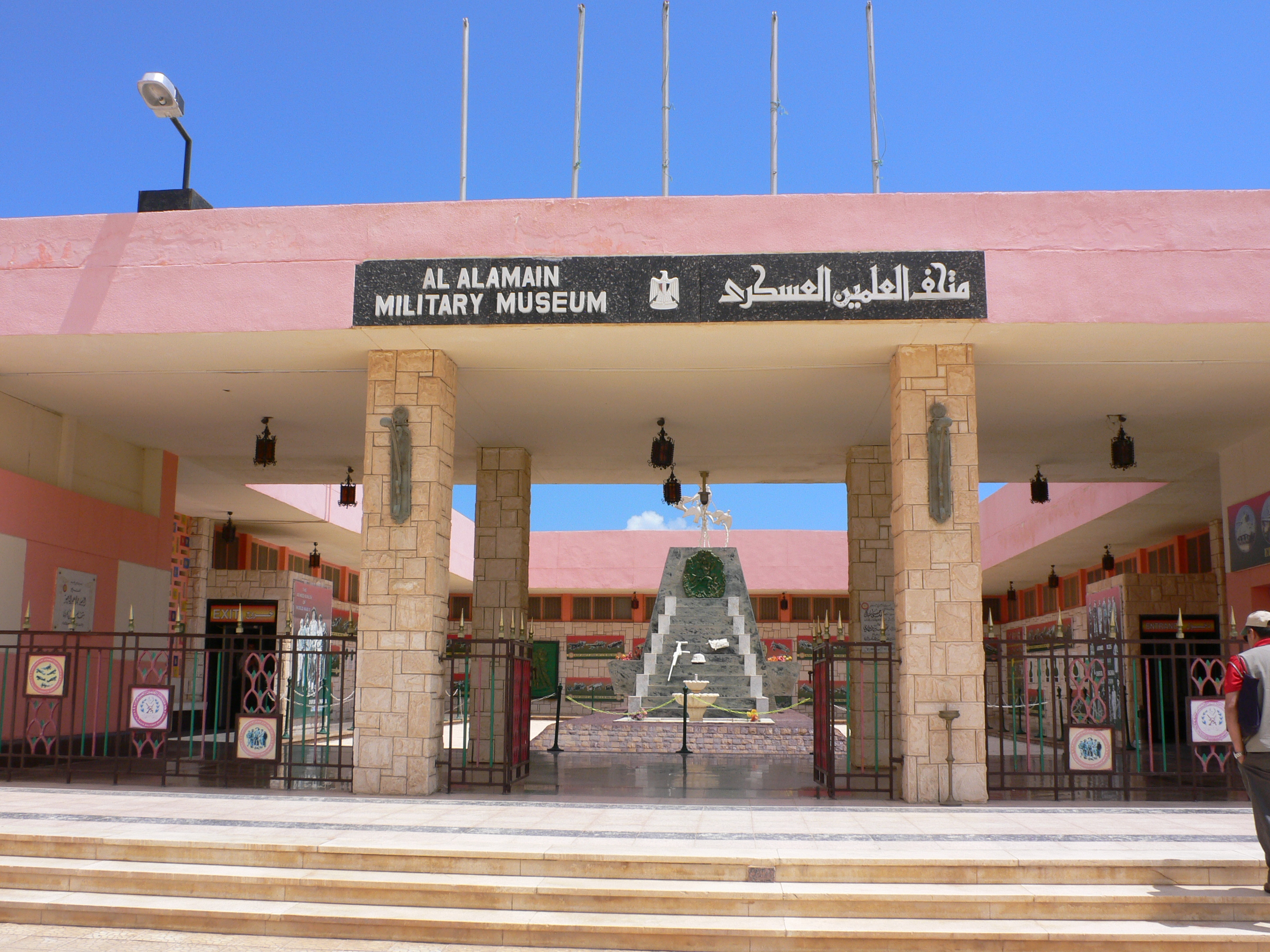
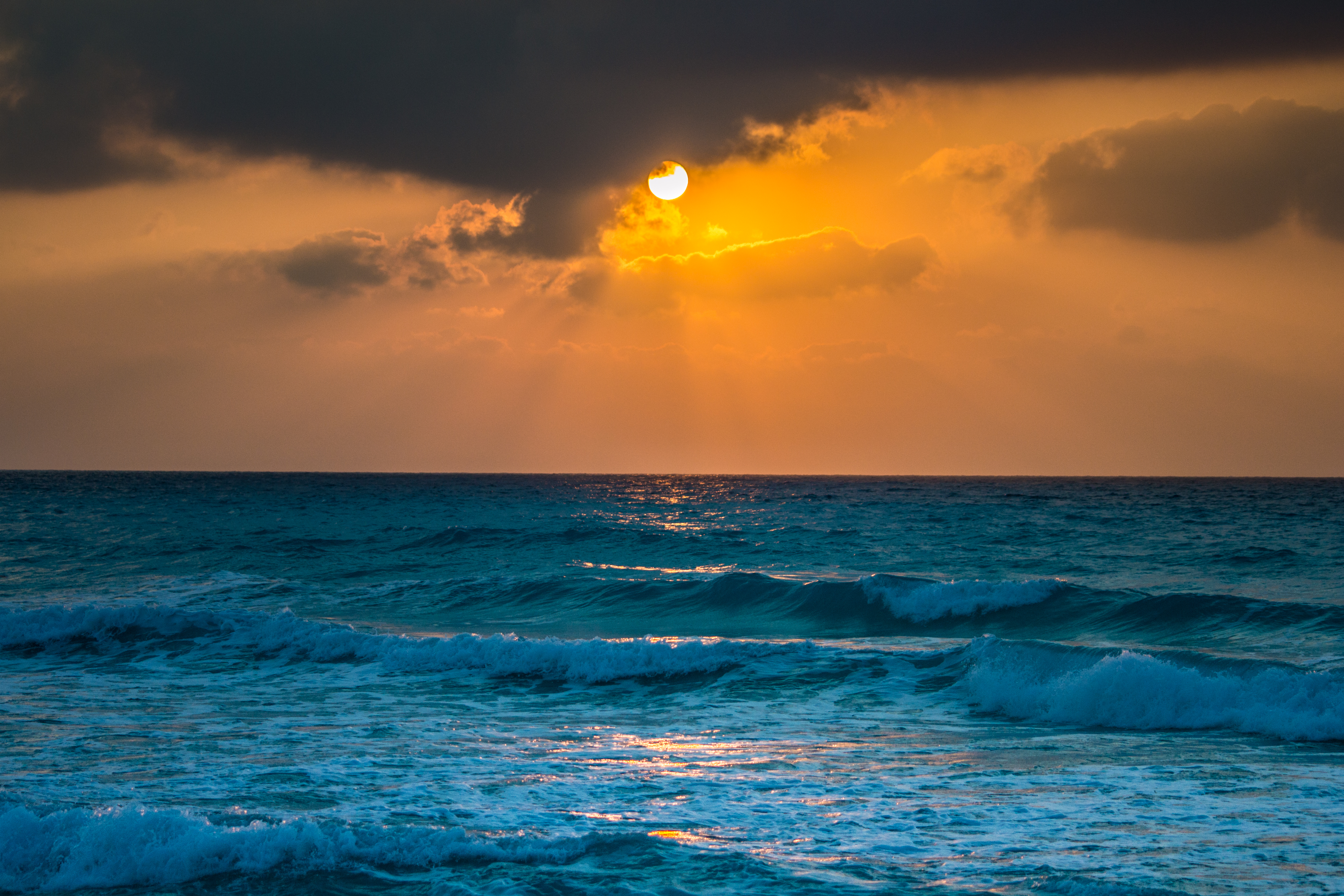
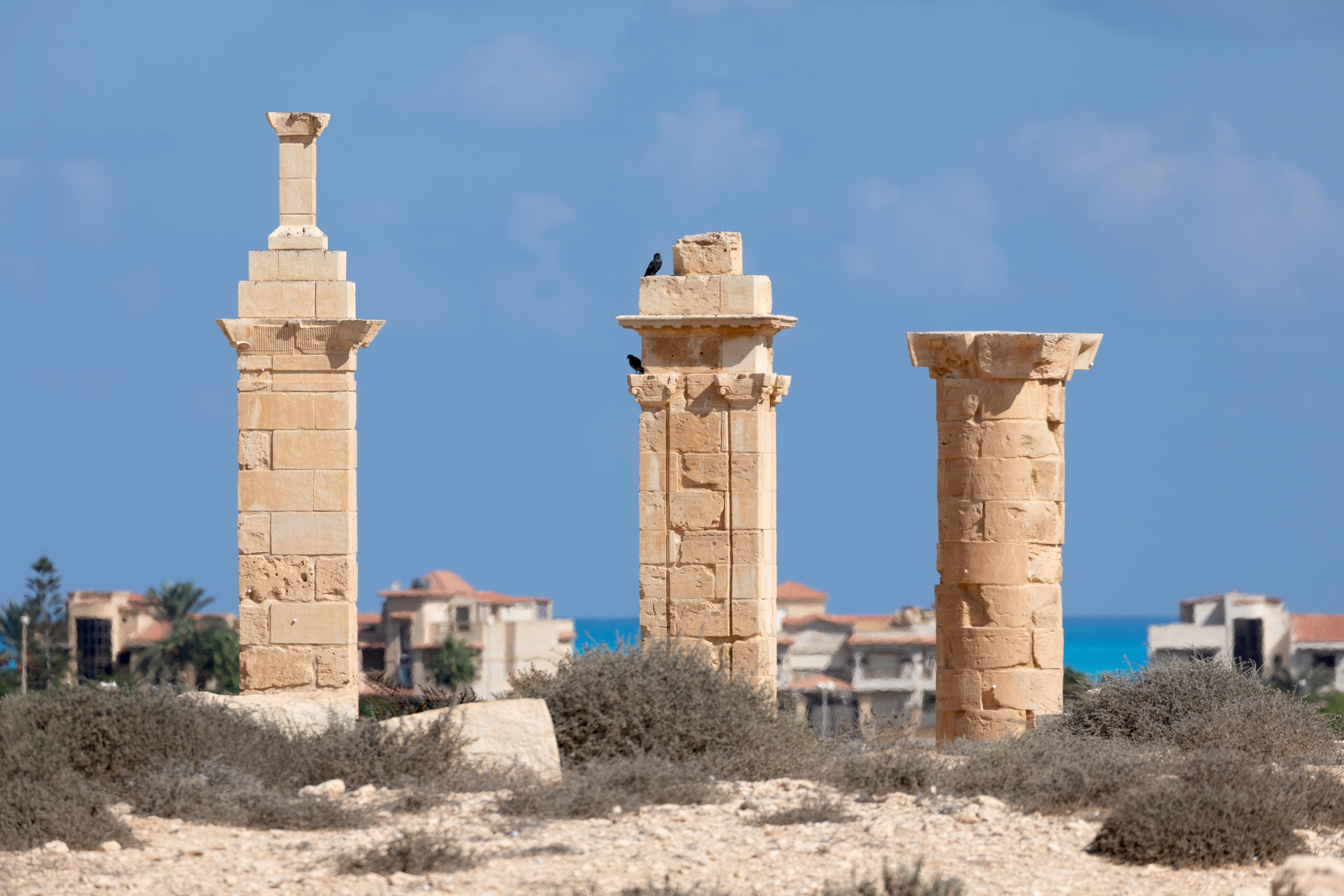
- Marina's Porto Resort The German Memorial Alamein Port Alamein Church Alamein Military Museum The Mediterranean Marina Alamein Arch Site Tomb

- Location in Egypt
- Coordinates: 30°50′N 28°57′E
- Country: Egypt
- Governorate: Matrouh

Area
  - Total: 342.0 km^{2} (132.0 sq mi)

Population (2023)
  - Total: 12,580
  - Density: 36.78/km^{2} (95.27/sq mi)
- Time zone: UTC+2 (EET)
  - Summer (DST): UTC+3 (EEST)

Historical population
Year	Pop.	±%
2007	7,397	—
2017	10,013	+35.4%

El Alamein (Note: (Egyptian Arabic: العلمين, romanized: el-ʿalamayn, lit. 'The Two Flags', IPA: [elʕælæˈmeːn])) is an Egyptian city in the northern Matrouh Governorate. Located on the Mediterranean Sea, it lies 106 kilometres (66 mi) west of Alexandria and 300 kilometres (186 mi) northwest of Cairo. The city is divided into three main areas: El Alamein, Cidi, and Tal El Eis village.

The city's economy is mainly based on its natural resources of petroleum, which is explored by several Egyptian companies, and the tourist areas where many luxury hotels and tourist resorts are located, such as the tourist town of Marina.

== Tourism ==
Many Egyptians, particularly the upper and middle class travel in huge masses to El Alamein and North Coast every summer to flee the summer heat in other cities and towns.

== Climate ==
El Alamein has a hot desert climate, Köppen climate classification BWh, common with most of the Middle East and North Africa. However, like the rest of the northern coast of Egypt, its climate is slightly less hot, compared to the rest of Egypt, because of the prevailing Mediterranean Sea winds.

Climate data for El Alamein
Month	Jan	Feb	Mar	Apr	May	Jun	Jul	Aug	Sep	Oct	Nov	Dec	Year
Mean daily maximum °C (°F)	17.8 (64.0)	18.7 (65.7)	20.3 (68.5)	23.5 (74.3)	25.7 (78.3)	28.8 (83.8)	29.5 (85.1)	30.5 (86.9)	28.7 (83.7)	27.5 (81.5)	23.6 (74.5)	19.7 (67.5)	24.5 (76.2)
Daily mean °C (°F)	12.4 (54.3)	13.3 (55.9)	14.9 (58.8)	17.7 (63.9)	20.5 (68.9)	23.8 (74.8)	25.2 (77.4)	25.7 (78.3)	24.4 (75.9)	22.1 (71.8)	18.3 (64.9)	14.4 (57.9)	19.4 (66.9)
Mean daily minimum °C (°F)	7 (45)	7.9 (46.2)	9.5 (49.1)	12 (54)	15.4 (59.7)	18.8 (65.8)	20.9 (69.6)	21 (70)	20.1 (68.2)	16.7 (62.1)	13 (55)	9.2 (48.6)	14.3 (57.8)
Average precipitation mm (inches)	29 (1.1)	17 (0.7)	8 (0.3)	2 (0.1)	1 (0.0)	0 (0)	0 (0)	0 (0)	0 (0)	5 (0.2)	21 (0.8)	24 (0.9)	107 (4.1)
Source: climate-data.org

== World War II ==
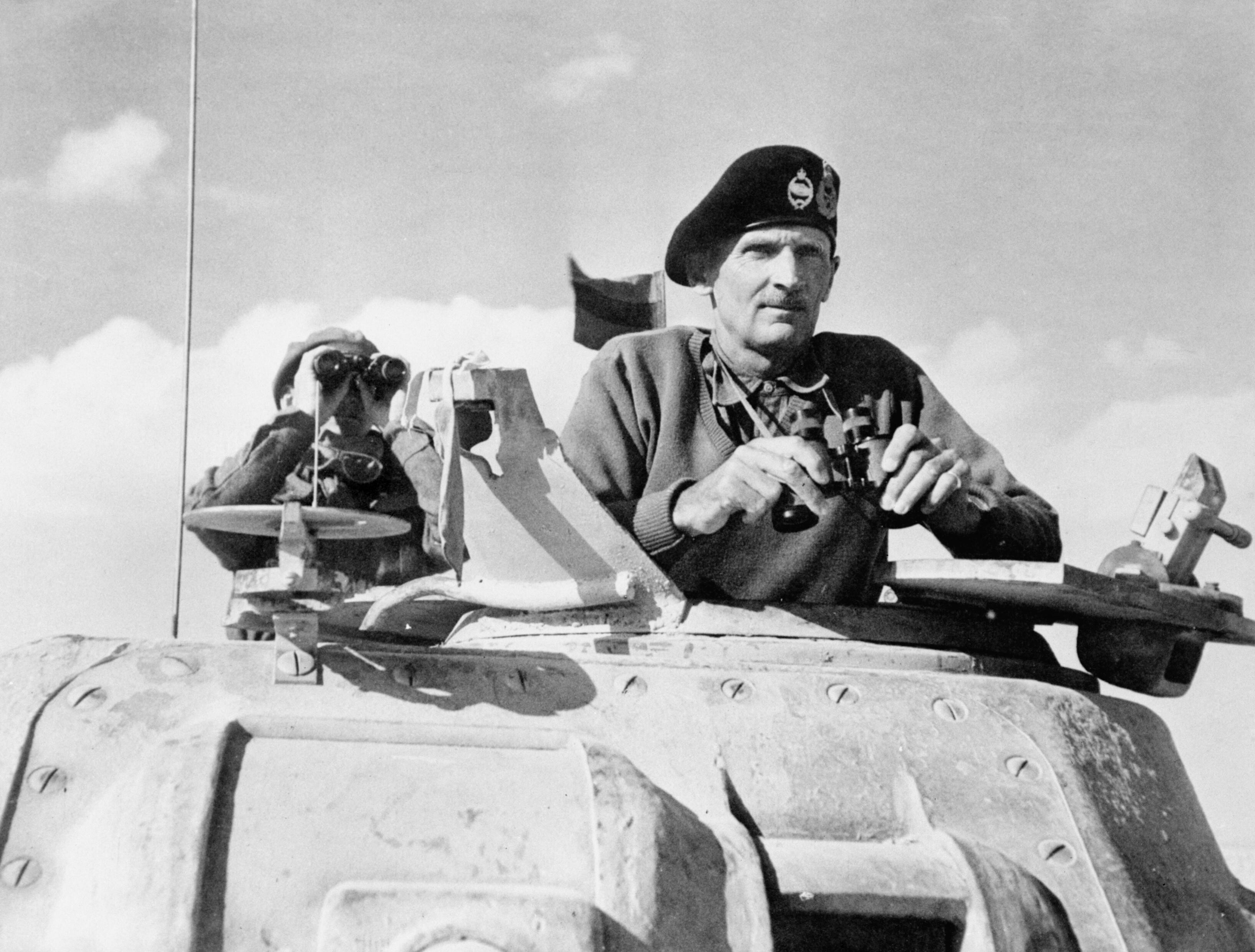
Bernard Montgomery watches his tanks move up during the Battle of El Alamein.

Two important World War II battles were fought in the area:

- At the First Battle of El Alamein (1–27 July 1942), the advance of Axis troops on Alexandria was blunted by the Allies, stopping the Italian and German forces that were trying to outflank the Allies' position.
- At the Second Battle of El Alamein (23 October – 4 November 1942), Allied forces broke the Axis line and forced them all the way back to Tunisia. Winston Churchill, the British Prime Minister at the time, said of this victory: "Now this is not the end, it is not even the beginning of the end. But it is, perhaps, the end of the beginning." After the war, he wrote: "Before Alamein we never had a victory. After Alamein, we never had a defeat."

=== Military cemeteries ===
There are Italian and German military cemeteries on Tel el-Eisa Hill outside the town. The German cemetery is an ossuary, built in the style of a medieval fortress. The cemetery of the Italian War Memorial at El Alamein contains 5,200 graves.

There is also a Greek cemetery at El Alamein.

The Commonwealth Alamein Memorial and attached war cemetery, built and maintained by the Commonwealth War Graves Commission, has graves of soldiers from various countries who fought on the Allied side.

=== Gallery ===
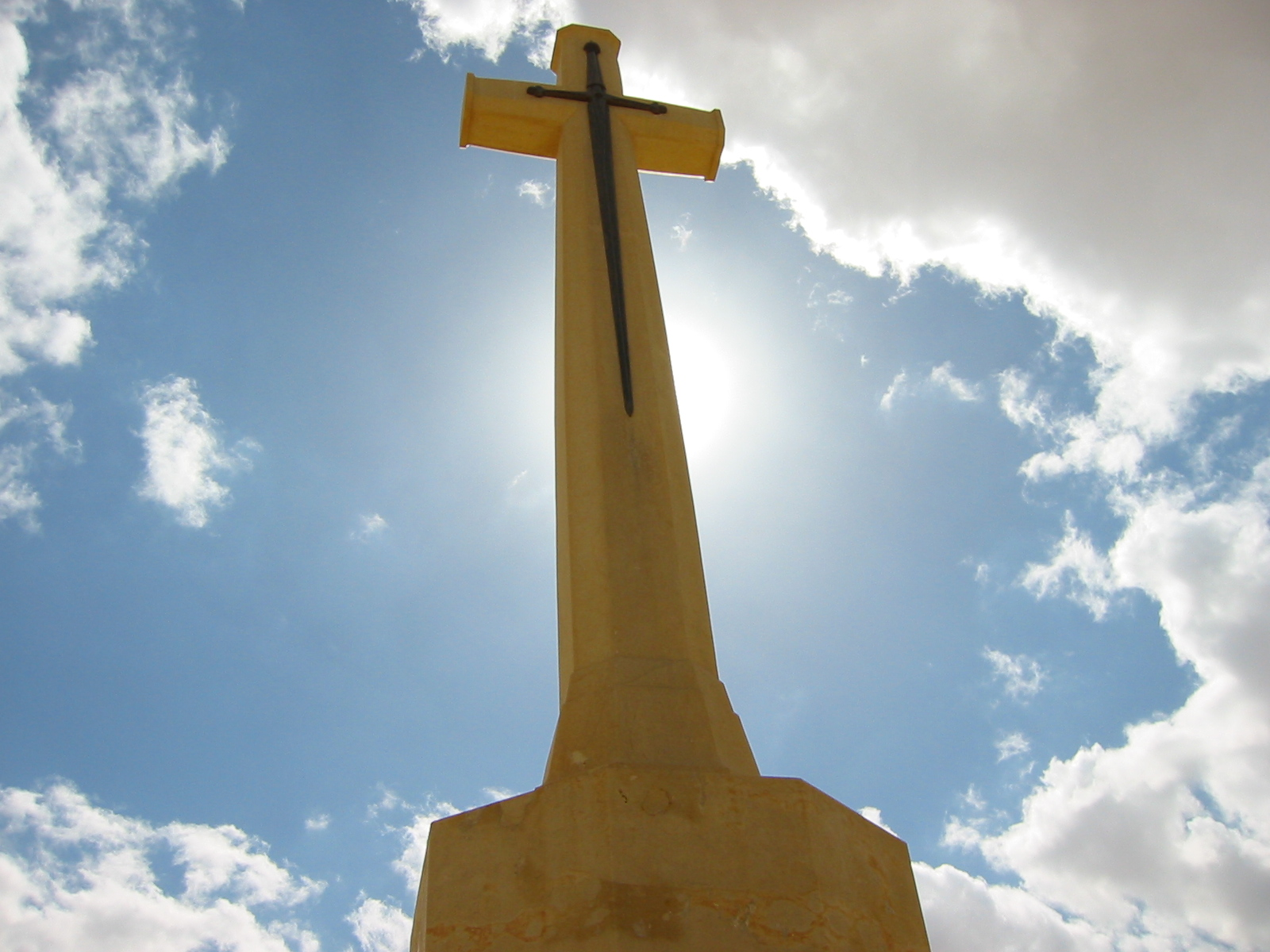
Cross of Sacrifice, El Alamein Commonwealth cemetery

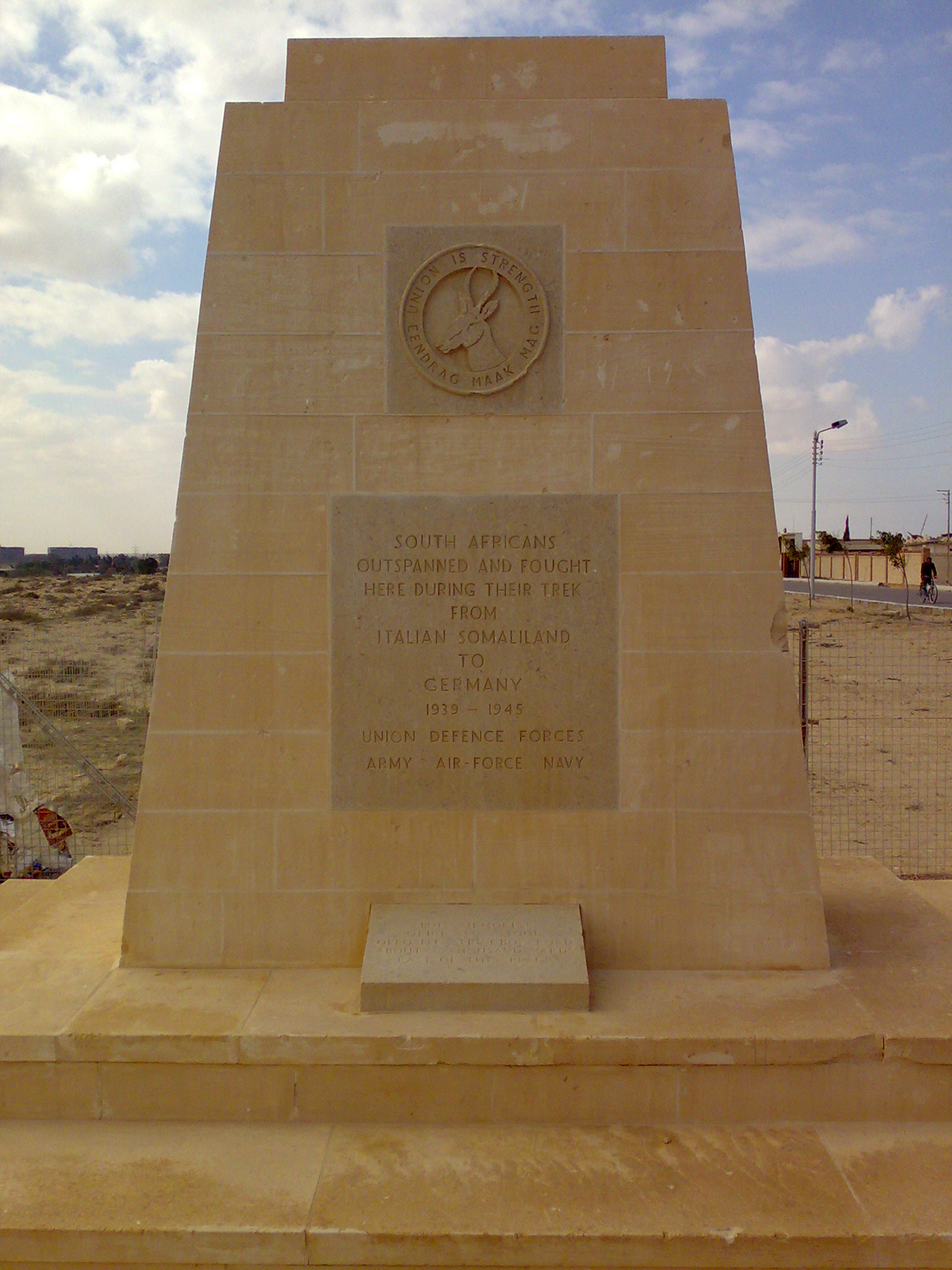
South African Memorial El Alamein Commonwealth cemetery

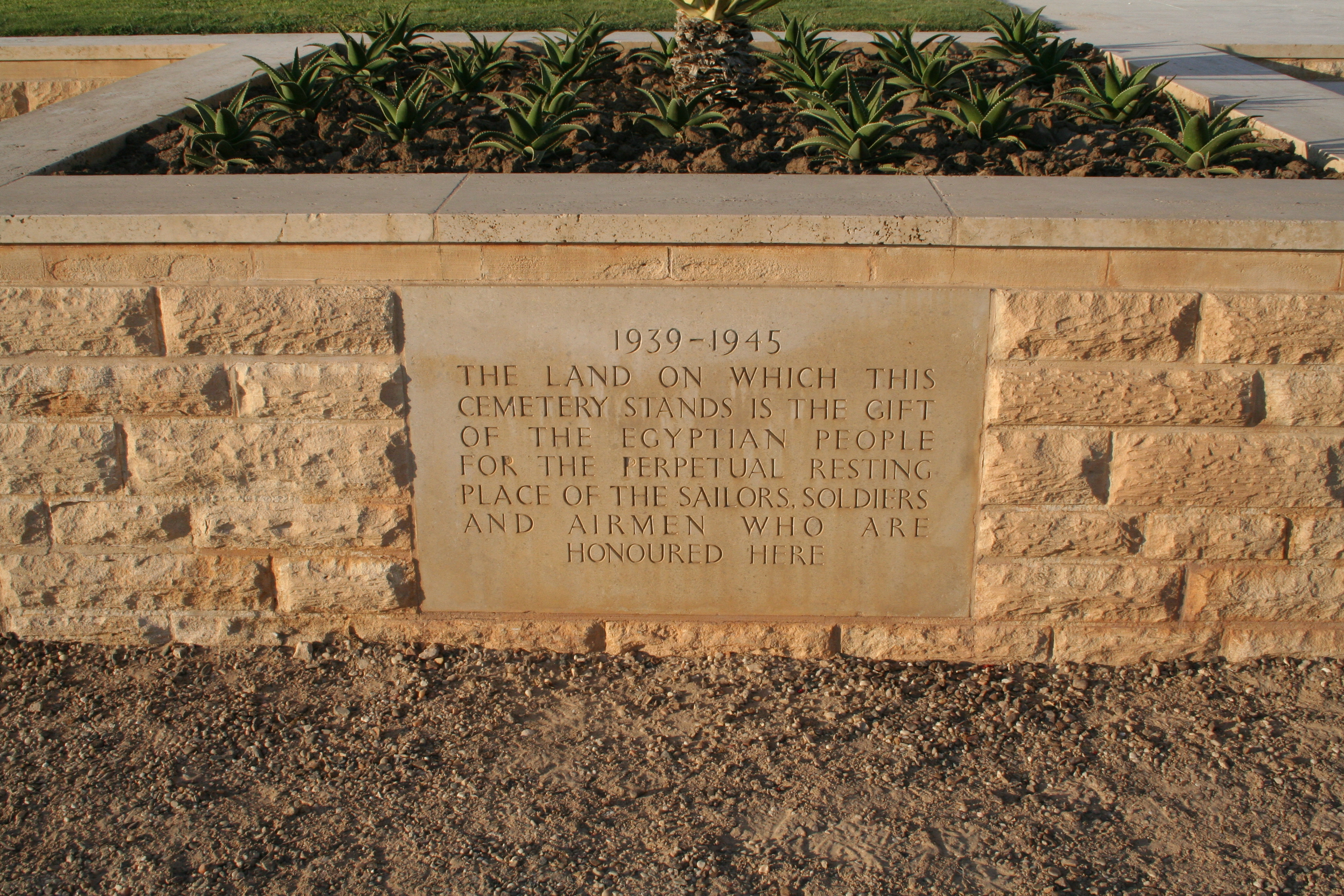
El Alamein Commonwealth cemetery plaque – 1939–1945 – The land on which this cemetery stands is the gift of the Egyptian people for the perpetual resting place of the sailors, soldiers and airmen who are honoured here.

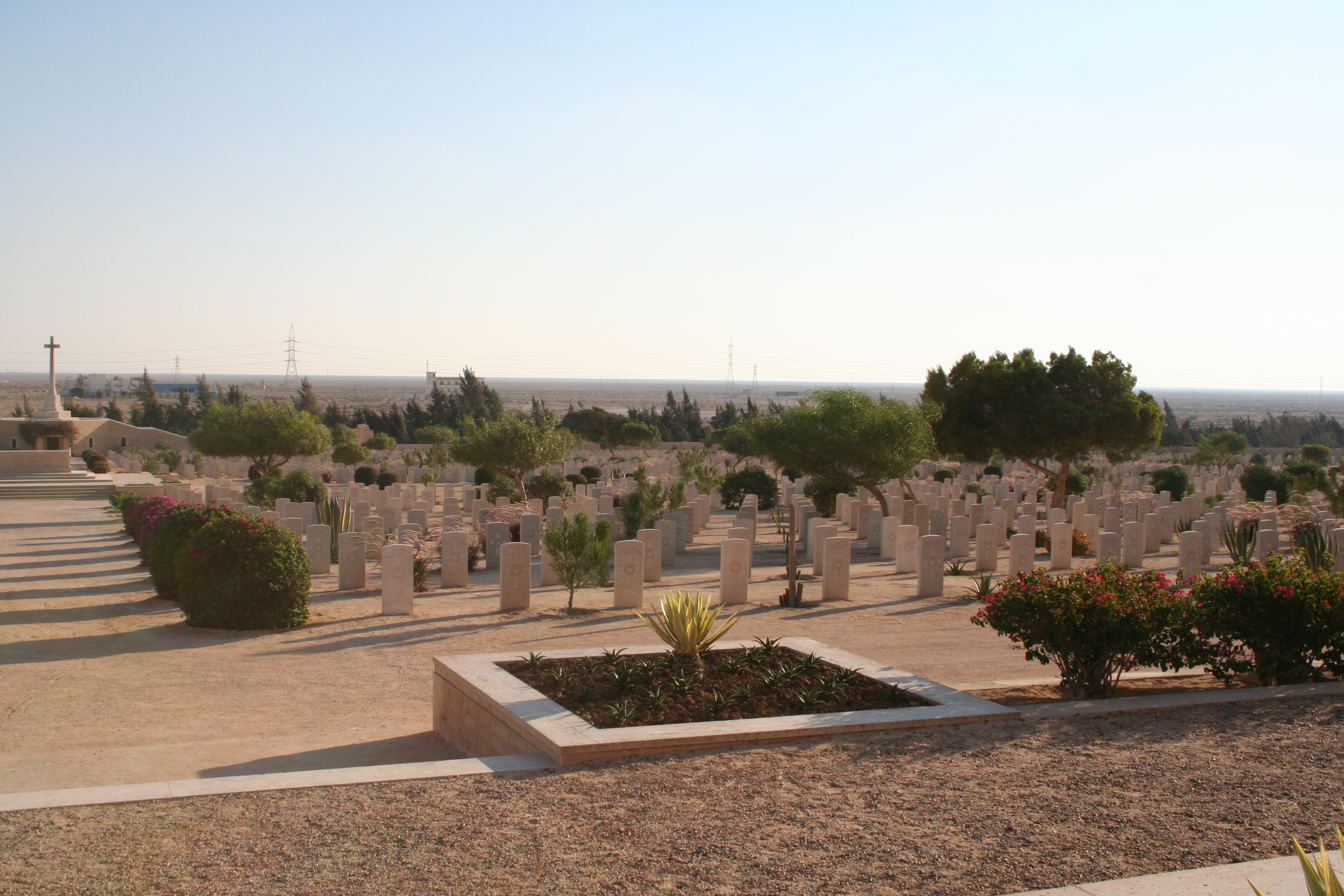
El Alamein Commonwealth cemetery

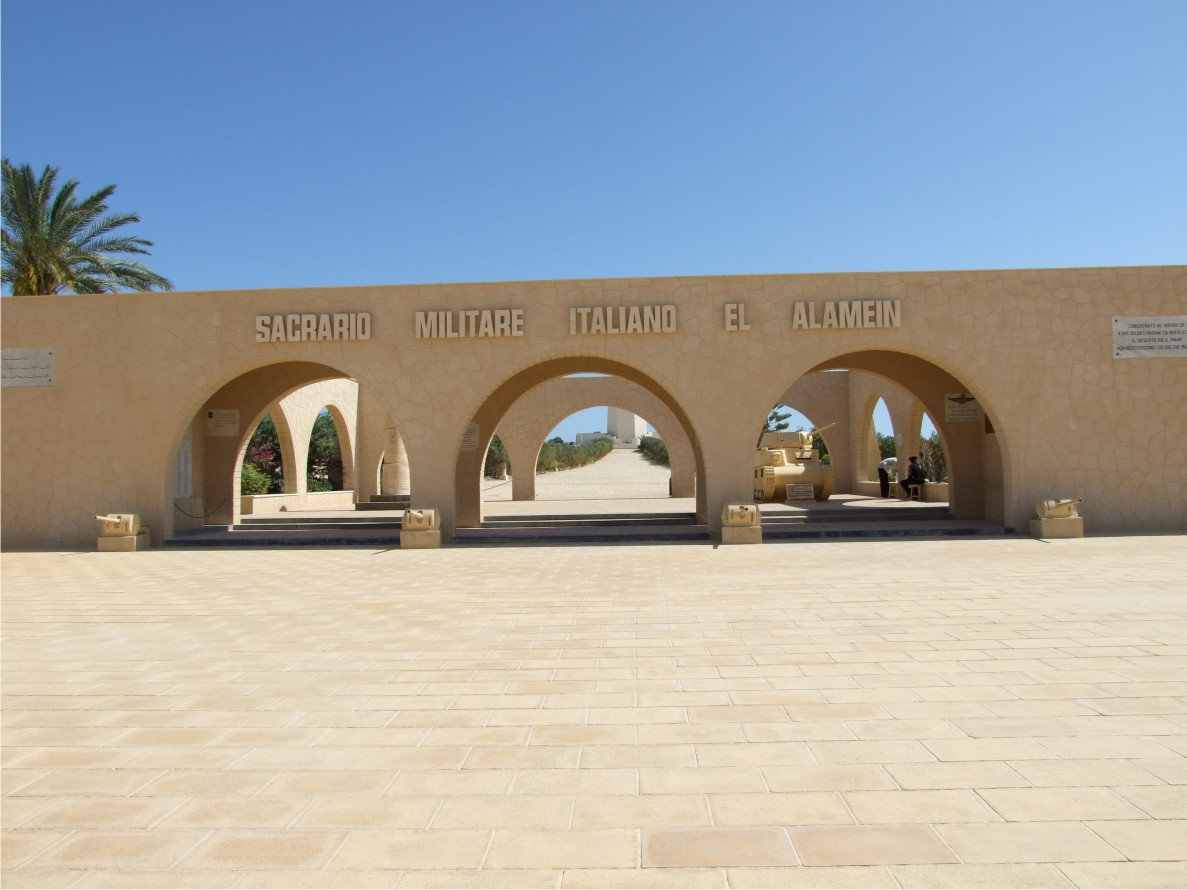
Italian War Memorial at El Alamein

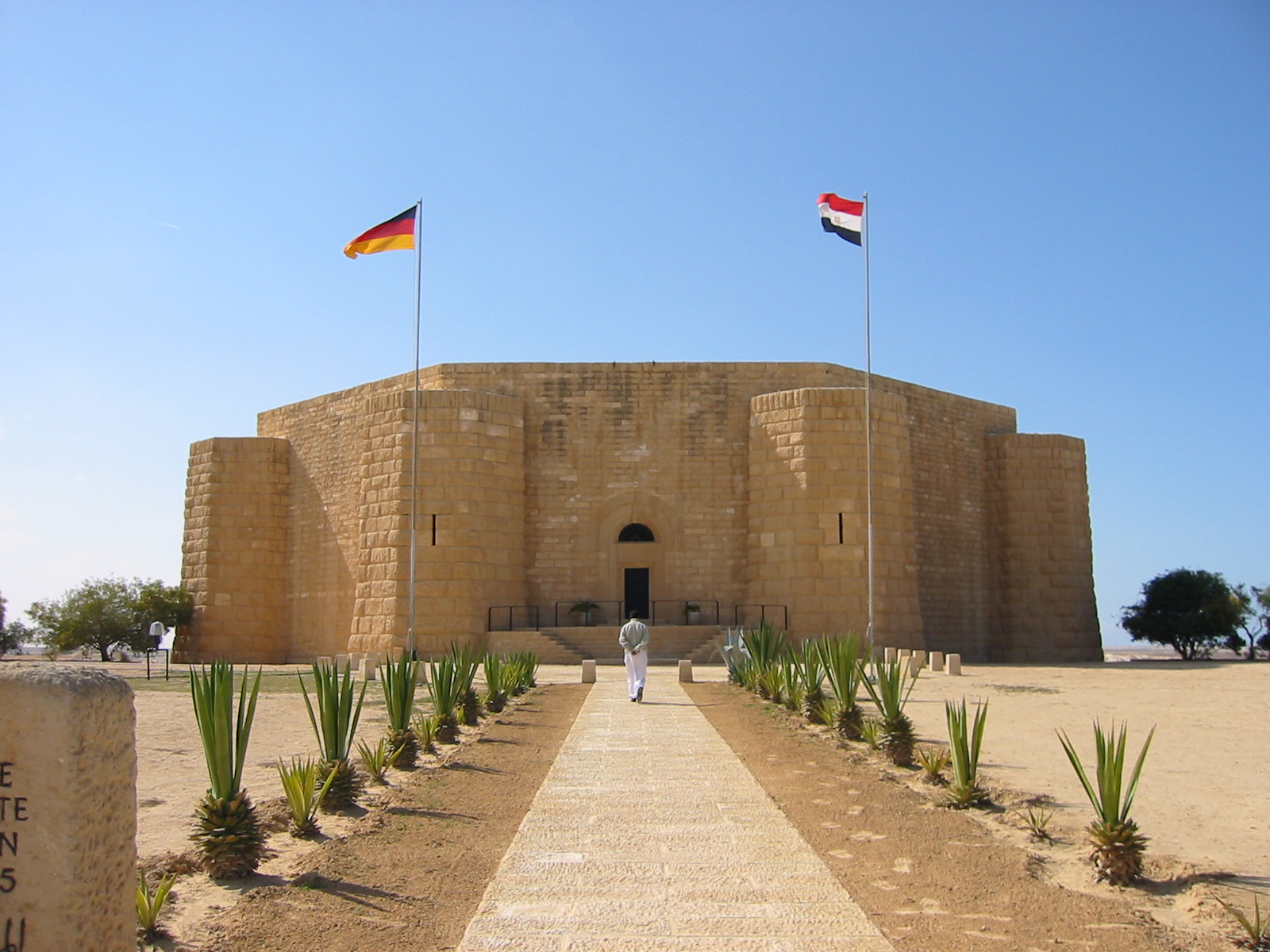
El Alamein German memorial

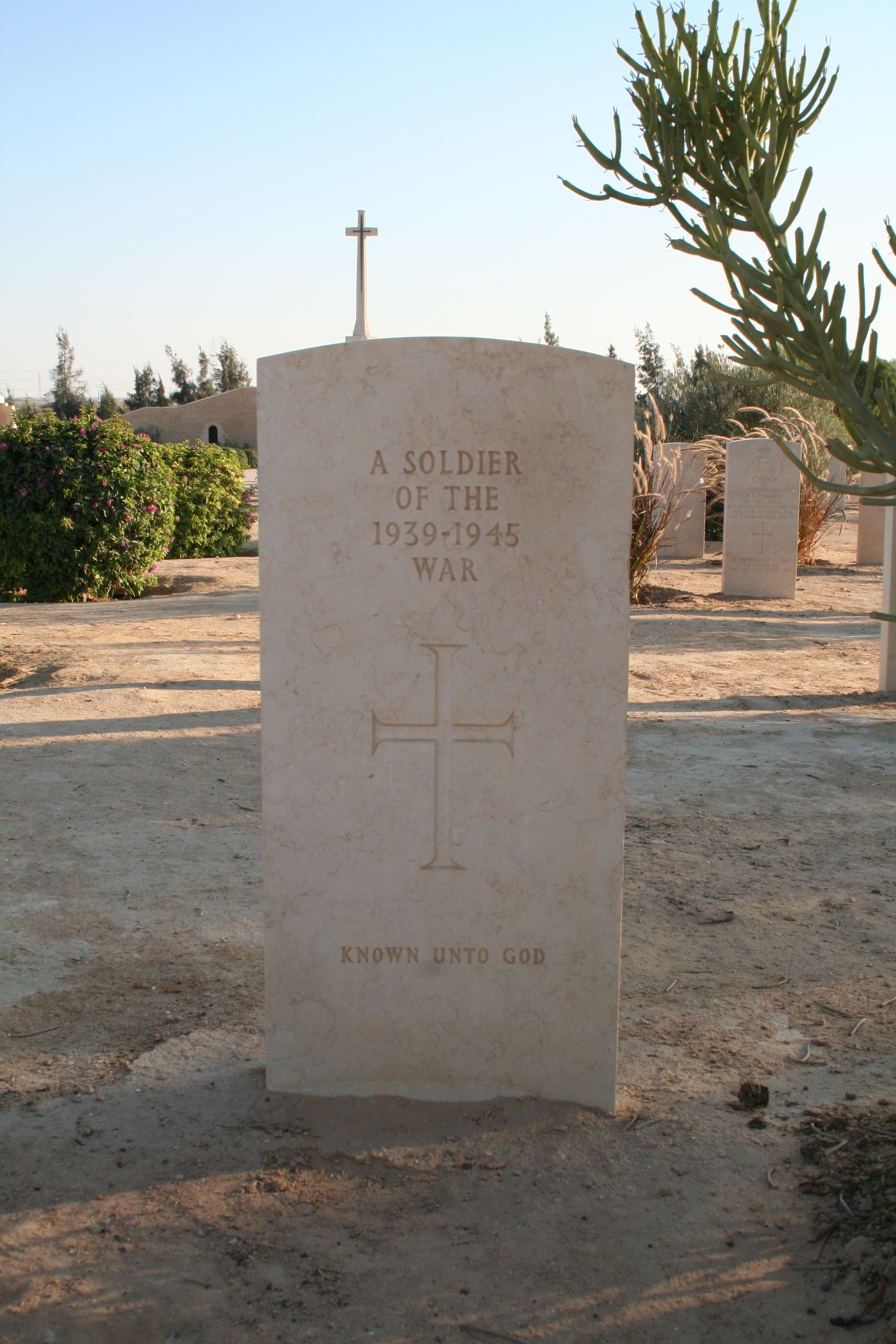
El Alamein Commonwealth cemetery – A soldier of the 1939–1945 war known unto God

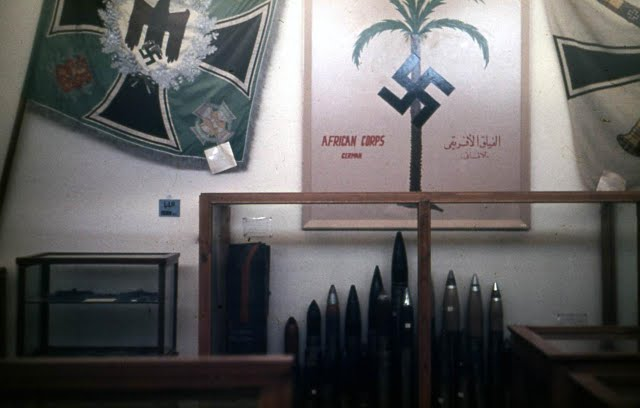
In El Alamein museum

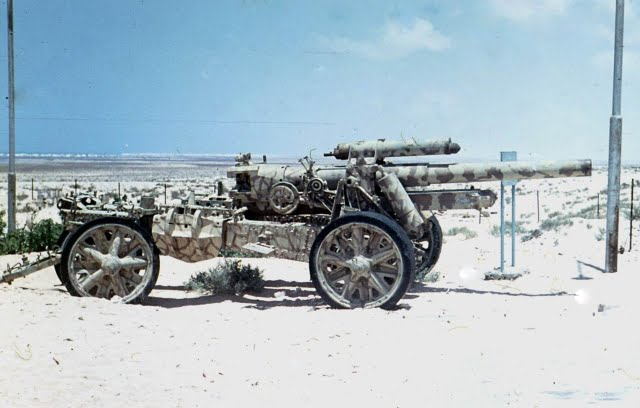
German cannon

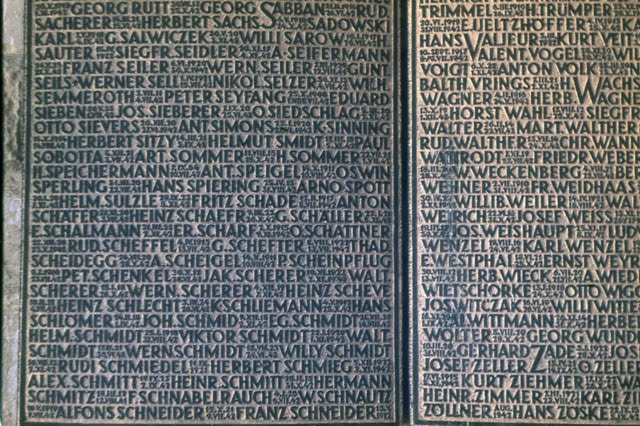
The list of fallen German soldiers

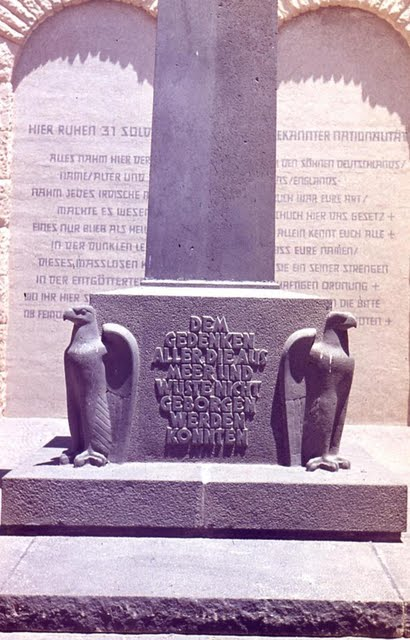
German Memorial

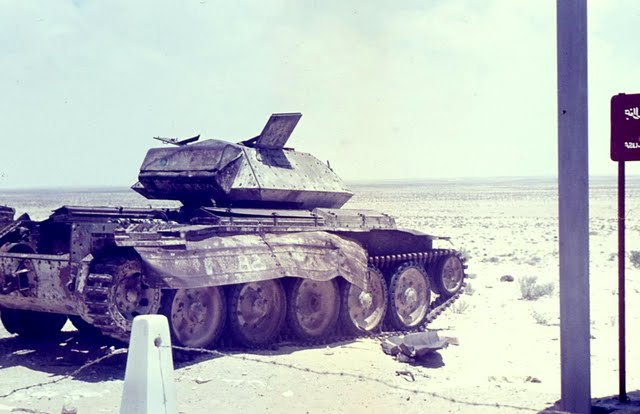
British Crusader tank

== See also ==
- El Alamein Fountain (war memorial commemorating the battle, in Sydney, Australia)
- El Alamein International Airport
- Enham Alamein (village in Hampshire in England, renamed after the battle)
- Marina El Alamein (tourist resort)
- New Alamein
