= Rowing at the 2014 African Youth Games =

- Venue: Gaborone Dam
- Dates: 24 May – 26 May
- Competitors: 32 from 12 nations

The rowing competitions at the 2nd African Youth Games in Gaborone were held from 24 May to 26 May 2014, at Gaborone Dam. Three medal events were contested by 32 athletes from 12 countries.

Tunisia was the most successful nation, topping the medal table with two golds and three in total. South Africa finished second with one gold and three medals overall. Egypt finished third with three bronze medals.

== Venue ==
All of the rowing events were staged at Gaborone Dam located south of Gaborone along the Gaborone-Lobatse road.

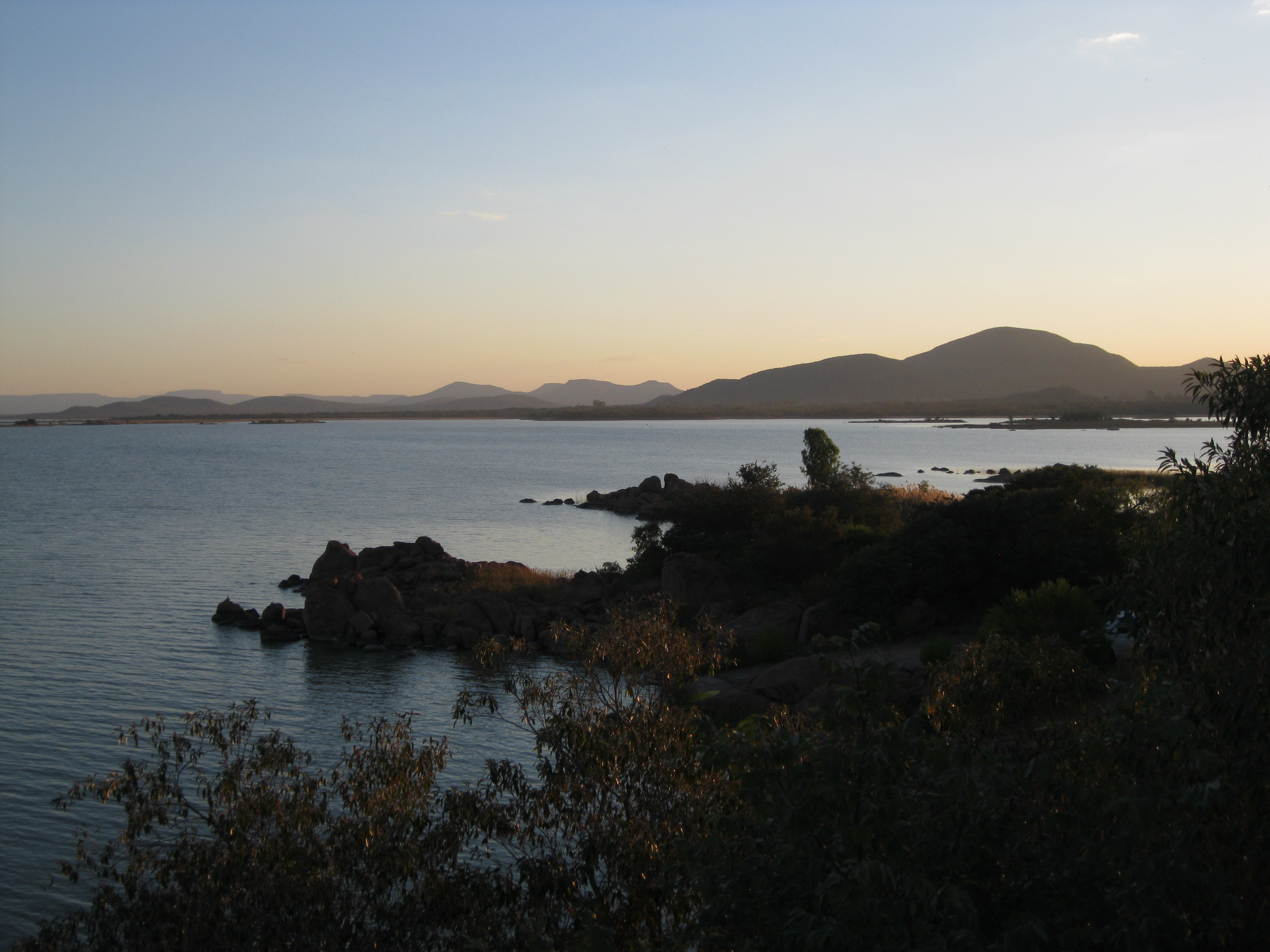
Gaborone Dam at sunset.

== Events ==
There were three single scull events:

- 500 m sprint for men.
- 500 m sprint for women.
- 500x2 mixed relay.

=== Medal table ===
Rank	Nation	Gold	Silver	Bronze	Total
1	Tunisia	2	1	0	3
2	South Africa	1	2	0	3
3	Egypt	0	0	3	3
Totals (3 entries)		3	3	3	9

== Medal summary ==
=== Men's events ===
500 m sprint single sculls.

Event:	Gold:	Time	Silver:	Time	Bronze:	Time
JM1x	Tunisia; Mohamed Taieb	1:46.97	South Africa; Daniel Watkins	1:47.57	Egypt; Mahmoud Qattara	1:51.88

=== Women's events ===
500 m sprint single sculls.

Event:	Gold:	Time	Silver:	Time	Bronze:	Time
JW1x	South Africa; Amy Mattushek	2:05.62	Tunisia; Nour Ettaieb	2:06.73	Egypt; Esraa Ibrahim	2:18.90

=== Mixed Relay ===
500x2 mixed relay single sculls.

Event:	Gold:	Time	Silver:	Time	Bronze:	Time
JMix1x	Tunisia; Nour Ettaieb (01:54.92); Mohamed Taieb (01:39.52)	03:35.24	South Africa; Rosanne Bentley (01:48.38); Charles Brittain (01:47.28)	03:36.06	Egypt; Mohamed Noureldin (01:40.13); Esraa Ibrahim (02:16.51)	03:57.04
