= Marina, Egypt =

Marina
- town
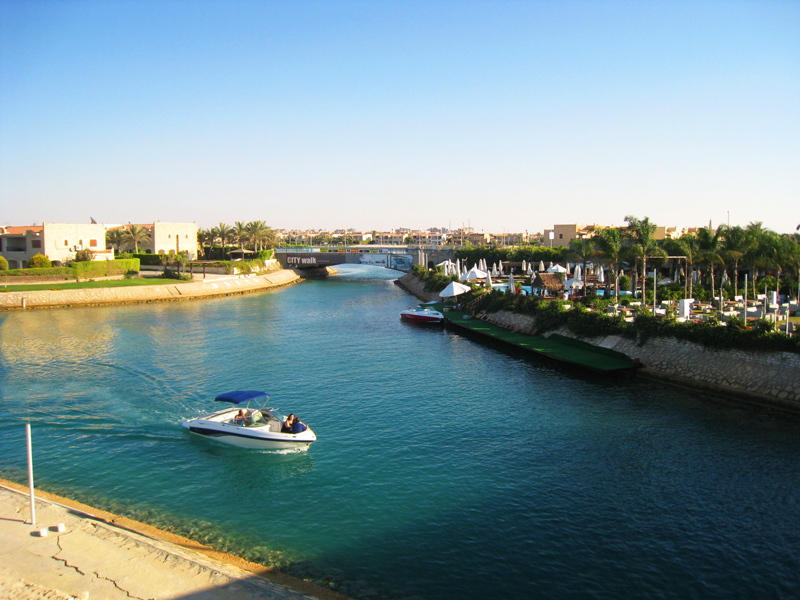
- Marina's lake in Summer

- Location in Egypt
- Coordinates: 30°49′N 29°3′E
- Country: Egypt
- Governorate: Matrouh
- Time zone: UTC+2 (EET)
  - Summer (DST): UTC+3 (EEST)

Marina, also Marina El Alamein (Arabic: مارينا العلمين Egyptian Arabic pronunciation: [mæˈɾiːnæ l.ʕælæˈmeːn]), ancient Leukaspis or Antiphrae, is an upscale resort town catering mainly to the Egyptian upper class. It is located on the northern coast of Egypt, with an 11 km (6.8 mi) long beach, about 300 km (190 mi) away from Cairo, in the El Alamein area.

== Archaeological site ==
The archaeological site of Marina El-Alamein lies about 5 kilometers to the east of the modern town of El-Alamein (96 kilometers west of Alexandria). It encompasses extensive remains of a harbor city from the Greco-Roman period, which functioned from the 2nd century BC to the 6th century AD.

Leukaspis was a large port town, with a population around 15,000. It was probably an important trading center between Egypt and Libya, and appears to have been a major center for Cretian imports. The settlement was destroyed in 365, when an earthquake off the coast of Crete created a tsunami. The town was not rebuilt, partially due to the crumbling state of the Roman Empire. Leukaspis was lost until 1986, when a group of engineers who were building roads in Marina revealed ancient houses and tombs. 200 acres (81 ha) of surrounding land was designated an archeological area, and excavations began in the 1990s. Prior to the site's discovery, the port area of the settlement was destroyed to make a man-made lagoon for a resort.

The area of archaeological investigations and conservation work extends about a kilometer along the sea coast and 550 meters inland. The archaeological and architectural research revealed the layout of the ancient city; several areas were distinguished. In the center lay the main square surrounded by porticoes, as well as Hellenistic and Roman baths and a basilica. The neighboring residential quarters were densely built-up. The port infrastructure (now destroyed) and storerooms were located to the north. A vast necropolis and a second (early Christian) basilica were discovered in the southern part of the site. The necropolis functioned from the end of the 2nd century BC to the 4th century AD. It is quite well-preserved and features an extraordinary variety of funerary monuments. Among the several dozen tombs of different form, there are types which had not been found in Egypt before or, if they had, were very badly preserved.

In 2010, the Egyptian government started to open up Leukaspis as an open-air museum in mid-September 2010, with the aim to increase tourism to Marina, and nearby El-Alamein and Taposiris Magna.

=== History of research ===
Salvage excavations organized by the Egyptian Ministry of State for Antiquities began in 1986. From 1988, Polish-Egyptian conservation expeditions, directed by Włodzimierz Bentkowski (1988–1989) and Jarosław Dobrowolski (1990–1993), worked at the site. In 1995, the Conservation Mission started, headed first by Stanisław Medeksza, and then Rafał Czerner from the Faculty of Architecture of the Wrocław University of Science and Technology. The project is conducted under the auspices of the Polish Centre of Mediterranean Archaeology University of Warsaw (PCMA UW) in cooperation with the Faculty of Architecture of the Wrocław University of Science and Technology and the Egyptian Ministry of State for Antiquities. Since 1987, the PCMA UW has also carried out archaeological excavations – Wiktor A. Daszewski directed them until 2011. He was succeeded by Krzysztof Jakubiak, who in 2019, after the reframing of the project, became the director of an interdisciplinary project combining conservation and archaeological work.

In July 2026, an Egyptian archaeological mission excavating the ancient city uncovered 18 tombs, comprising 11 rock-cut hypogea and 7 limestone-built surface tombs, several of which remained sealed with their original stone slabs. The excavations revealed a 2.5-metre-long sealed granite sarcophagus, fragments of a plaster sphinx, an unfinished marble statue of Aphrodite, a limestone false-door offering altar, glass lacrimaria, pottery, amphorae, oil lamps, and 24 gold tongue amulets placed in the mouths of the deceased in accordance with Greco-Roman funerary traditions. Archaeologists also documented additional architectural remains and surface burials, increasing the total number of excavated tombs at the site to 44 and providing further evidence for funerary practices and the multicultural development of Marina El Alamein, identified with the ancient city of Leukaspis, during the Hellenistic, Roman, and Byzantine periods.

== Tourism ==
The resort is a gated community only accessible to those who own property inside or have been authorized to enter by a property owner. Spanning almost 15 miles (24 km), this beach resort is split into seven different sections named Marina 1–7. Limestone villas and chalets with landscaped greenery characterize this exclusive part of the Middle East.

== Historical overlay ==
The resort was the site of a bustling Greco-Roman port two thousand years ago.

The area was ruined during that period by a tsunami that resulted from an earthquake that hit Crete to the northwest.

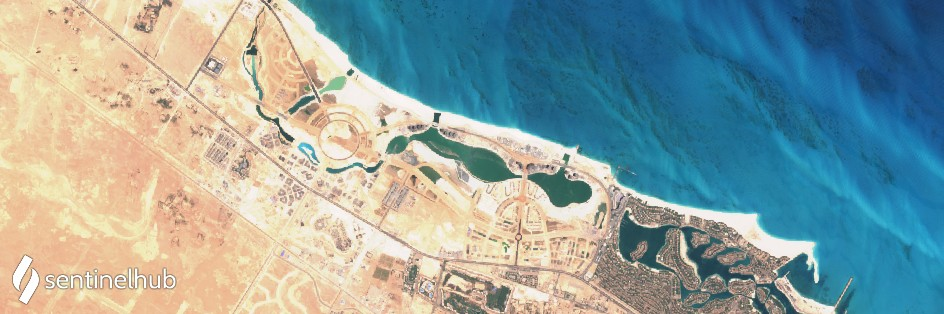
Satellite image

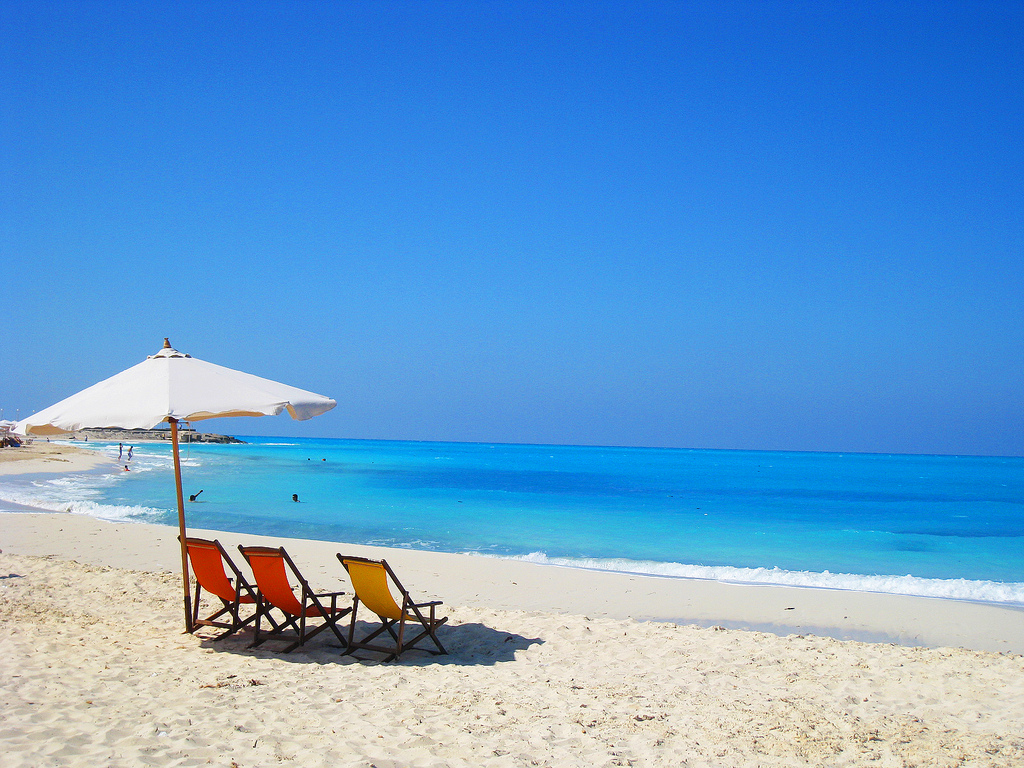
Beach at Marina

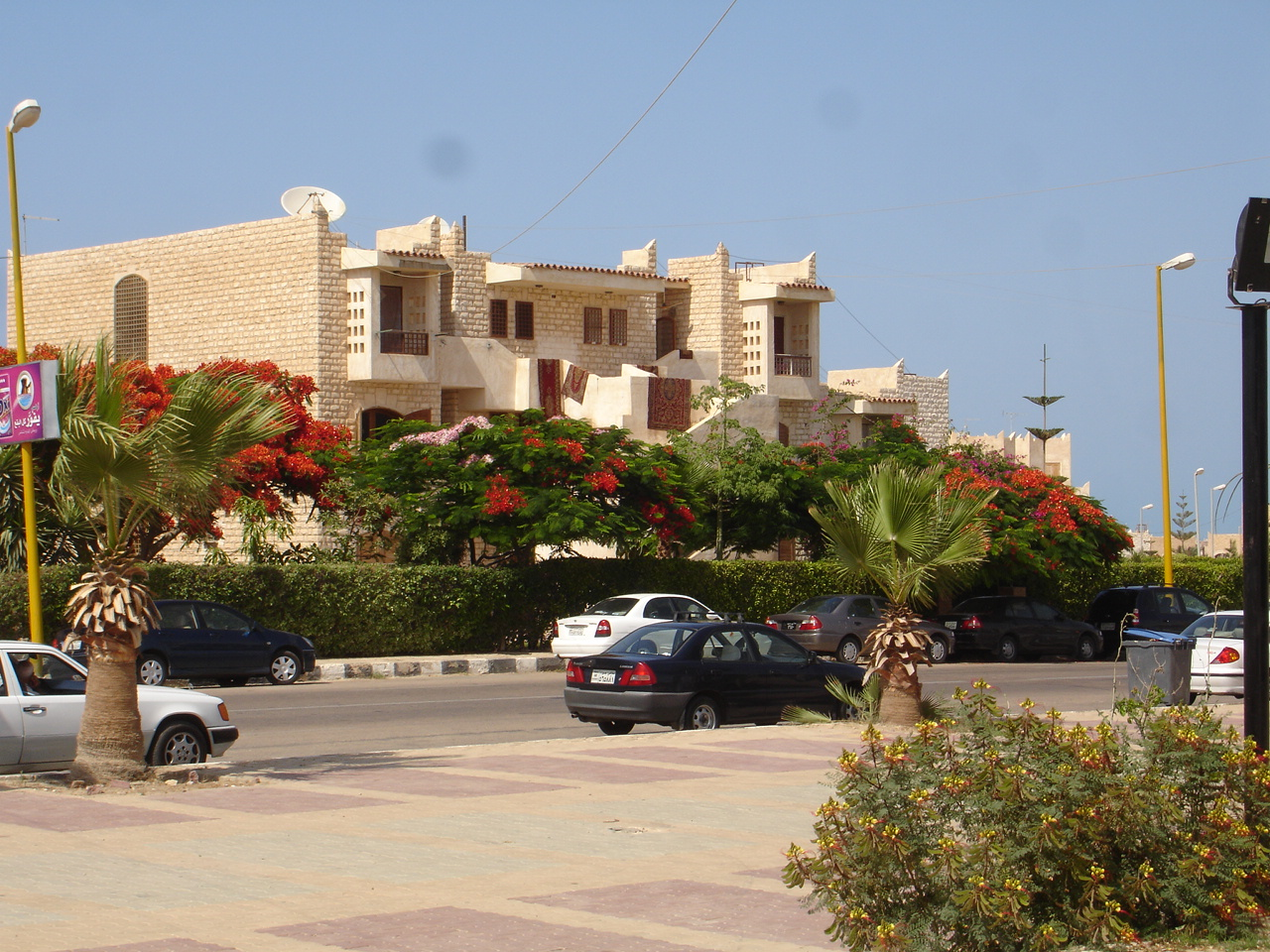
Limestone chalets in Marina

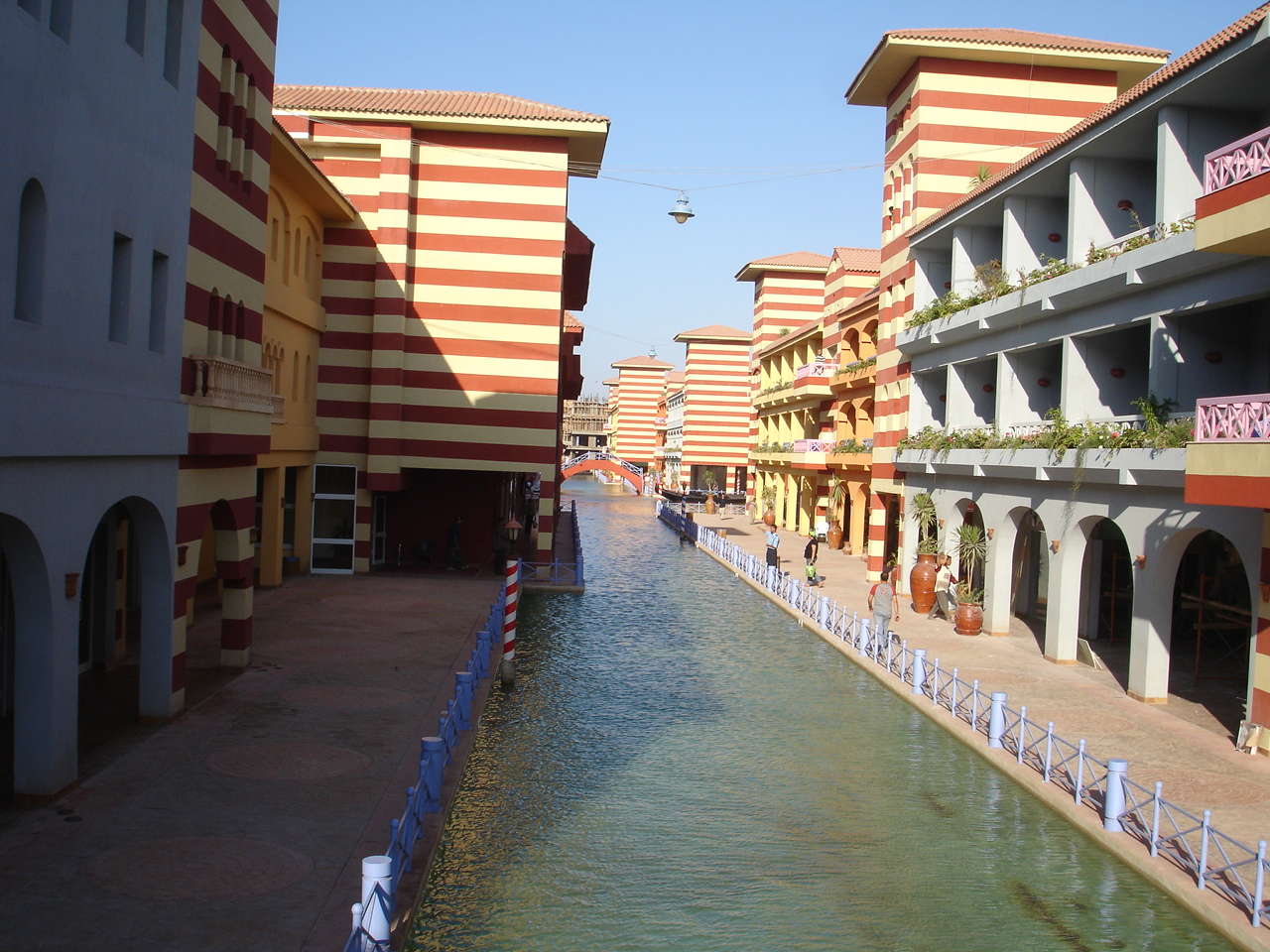
Venetian canals in Porto Marina.

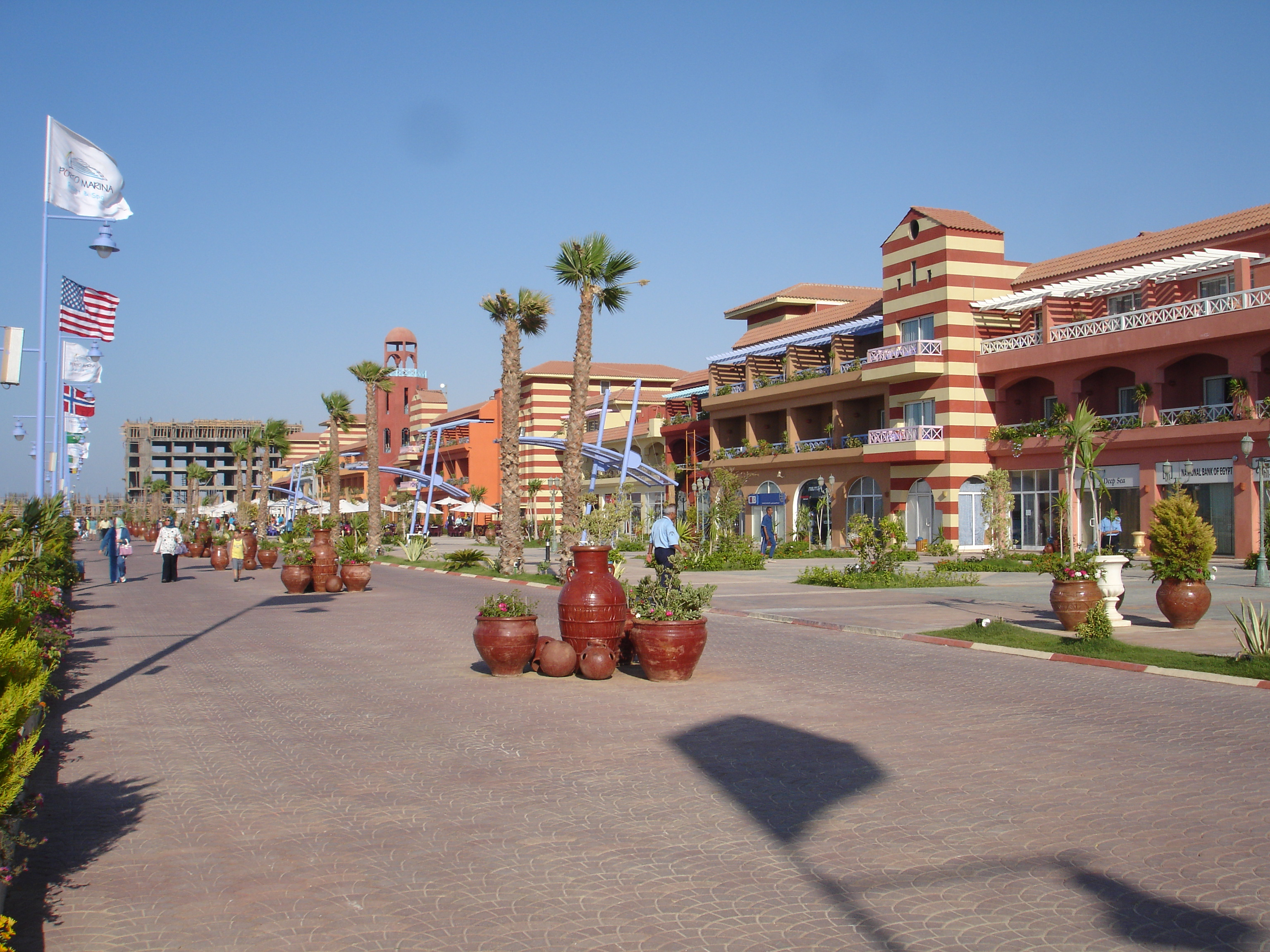
Hotels of Porto Marina.

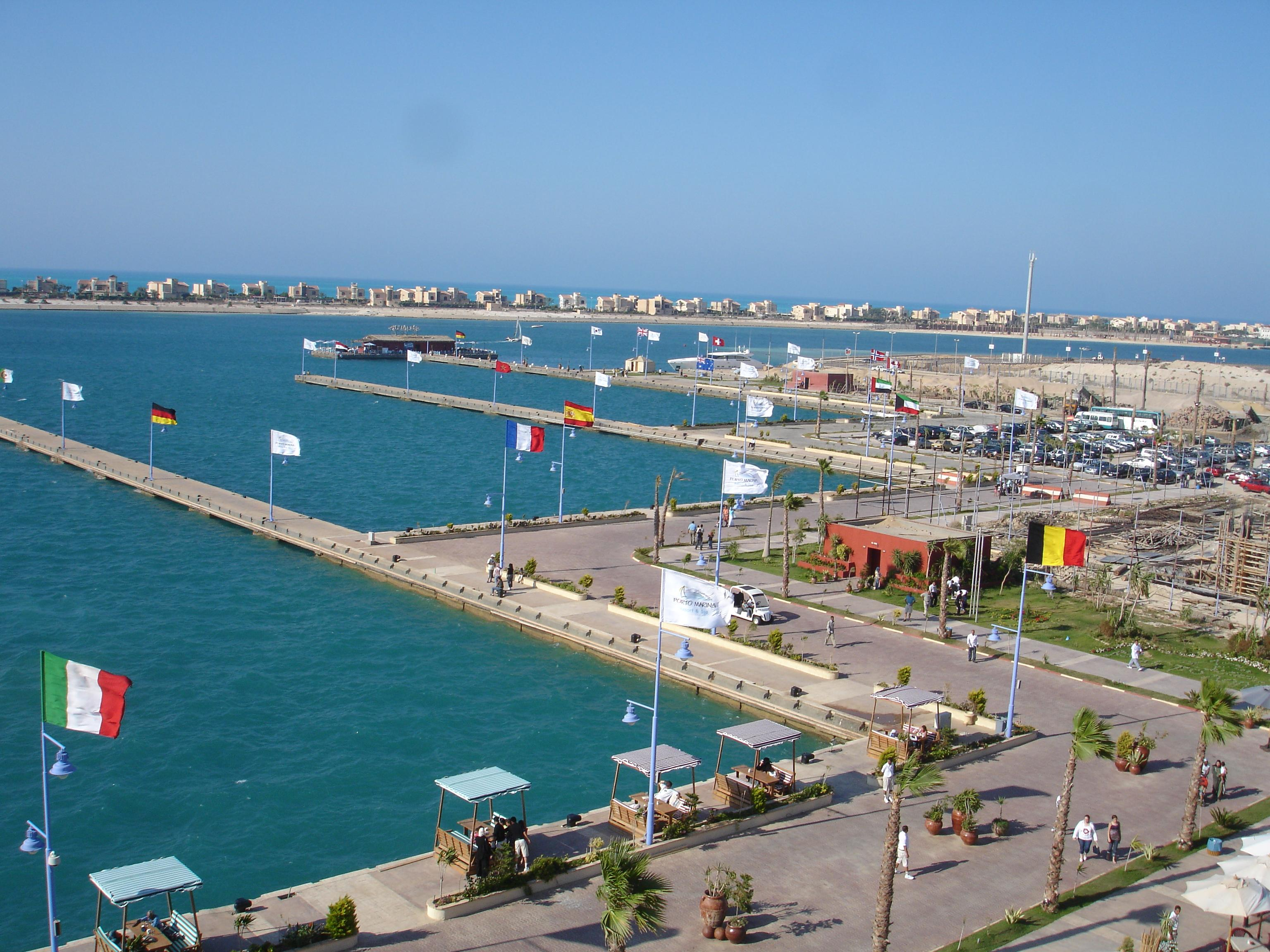
Porto Marina.

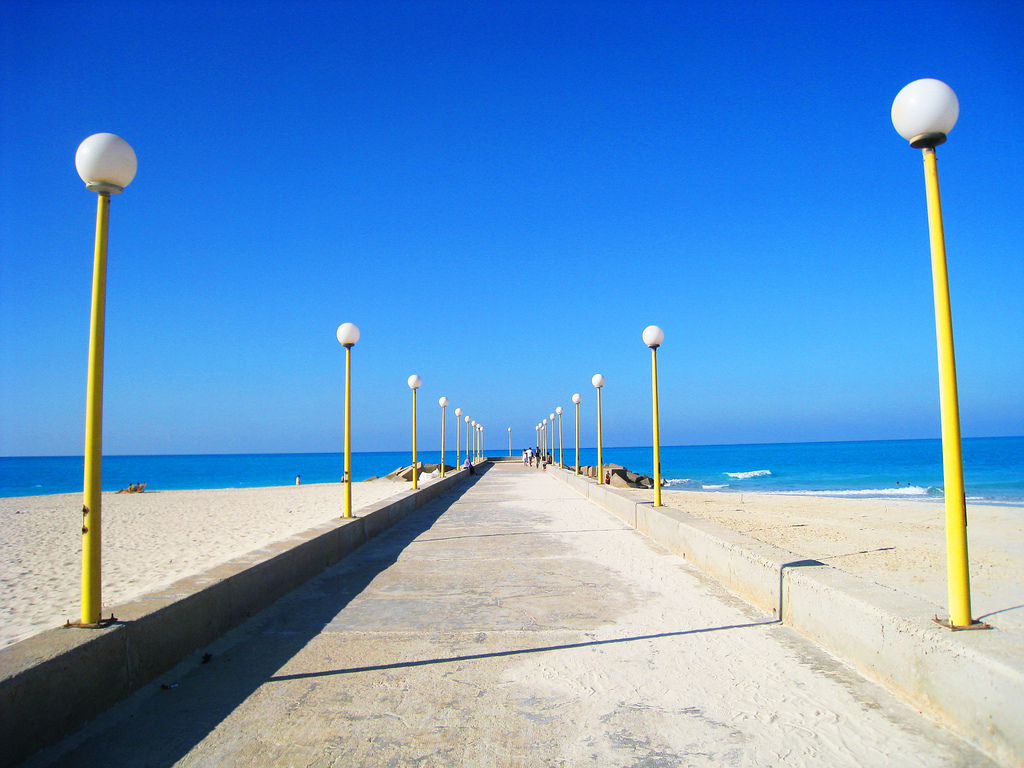
A Sea bridge in Marina.

== See also ==
- El Alamein
- La Femme (beach)
- Northern coast of Egypt
