= La Femme (beach) =

Women-only beach in Marina, Egypt

Coordinates: 30.837346°N 28.990190°E

La Femme (Arabic: شاطئ لافام) is a women-only beach in Marina, Egypt that mainly caters to Muslims who want to swim in comfort away from men and cameras. La femme started in 2005 (20 years ago). It is owned by Mohamed el Saadany, it was decorated by Lamia Yehia, and it's managed by Camilia el Saadany.
