= Femme Bar =

Lesbian bar in Worcester, Massachusetts, US

Femme Bar is a lesbian bar in Worcester, Massachusetts. Opened in 2023, it was the first new lesbian bar in New England in the contemporary period, after decades of decline from an estimated two hundred establishments in the 1980s.

== Overview ==
Femme Bar was founded by married partners Danielle Spring and Julie Toupin. The bar opened on March 10, 2023, at 62 Green Street. At the time of its opening, an estimated two dozen lesbian bars were operating in the United States.

In 2024, Spring and Toupin were included on the Worcester Business Journal Power 100 list, an annual compilation of notable figures in central Massachusetts. That same year, the bar received a People of Courage Award from Safe Homes Massachusetts in recognition of the bar's role in supporting LGBTQ+ youth.

In 2025, Femme Bar was designated one of sixteen venues in the Athletes Unlimited Women's Sports Bar Alliance, an official watch party network for the organization's professional softball league. In 2026, Femme Bar was among the venues selected by Togethxr, a women's sports media company, to broadcast the NCAA Women's Basketball Tournament.

The bar holds recurring events including drag performances, trivia nights, karaoke, speed dating, a book club, craft nights, and a college night. Friday evenings feature live performances by local musicians. The bar also holds periodic dance parties and themed entertainment nights.

== See also ==
- List of lesbian bars
