= Athletics at the All-Africa University Games =

The athletics competition at the All-Africa University Games has featured at all editions since the first in 1975. It was set for a tenth edition in 2020, but this was postponed due to the COVID-19 pandemic. The competition has an upper age limit of 25 years and only formal university students may compete.

The competition began with two events in the 1970s before having a relaunch in 2004. A reduced programme of only men's events were held during the 2004 edition.

== Editions ==
Games	Year	Host country	Host city	Dates	Nations	Competitors
I	1975	Ghana	Accra	27 December 1974 – 1 January 1975	13	
II	1979	Kenya	Nairobi	29 December 1978 – 8 January 1979	14	
–	1982	Zambia	Lusaka	Cancelled		
III	2004	Nigeria	Bauchi	14–22 April	15	
IV	2006	South Africa	Tshwane	1–8 July	16	
V	2008	Uganda	Kampala	6–16 July	14	
VI	2012	Namibia	Windhoek	15–22 December	18	
VII	2014	Kenya	Nairobi	11–18 July		
VIII	2016	South Africa	Johannesburg	26 June – 2 July		
IX	2018	Ethiopia	Mekelle	1–8 July		
—	2020	Kenya	Nairobi	Postponed		
X	2022	Kenya	Nairobi			
XI	2024	Ivory Coast	Abidjan			

== Men's champions ==
=== 100 metres ===
- 1975: Amadou Meïté (CIV)
- 1979: Ernest Obeng (GHA)
- 2004: Hamid Kasumu (NGR)

=== 200 metres ===
- 1975: Amadou Meïté (CIV)
- 1979: Georges Kablan Degnan (CIV)
- 2004: Richard Ogunloeye (NGR)

=== 400 metres ===
- 1975: Georges Kablan Degnan (CIV)
- 1979: Georges Kablan Degnan (CIV)
- 2004: Daouda Diop (SEN)

=== 800 metres ===
- 1975: Timo Ogunjobi (NGR)
- 1979: Peter Lemashon (KEN)
- 2004: Mathew Dauda (NGR)

=== 1500 metres ===
- 1975: ?. Oyomo (UGA)
- 1979: Wilson Waigwa (KEN)
- 2004: Ibrahim Ogunjobi (BEN)

=== 5000 metres ===
- 1975: ?. Opio-Orono (GHA)
- 1979: Samuel Nyariki (KEN)

=== 10,000 metres ===
- 1979: Michael Musyoki (KEN)

=== 3000 metres steeplechase ===
- 1979: James Munyala (KEN)

=== 110 metres hurdles ===
- 1975: Godwin Obasogie (NGR)
- 1979: Godwin Obasogie (NGR)
- 2004: Amadou Diouf (SEN)

=== 400 metres hurdles ===
- 1975: Timo Ogunjobi (NGR)
- 1979: Mountaga Diakhaté (SEN)
- 2004: Séléké Samaké (SEN)

=== High jump ===
- 1975: Kingsley Adams (GHA)
- 1979: Moussa Fall (SEN)

=== Pole vault ===
- 1975: Mohamed Alaa Ghita (EGY)
- 1979: Loué Legbo (CIV)

=== Long jump ===
- 1975: Charlton Ehizuelen (NGR)
- 1979: Charlton Ehizuelen (NGR)
- 2004: Ivory Onakpoberho (NGR)

=== Triple jump ===
- 1975: Charlton Ehizuelen (NGR)
- 1979: Joseph Kio (NGR)

=== Shot put ===
- 1975: Emad Fayez (EGY)
- 1979: Emad Fayez (EGY)

=== Discus throw ===
- 1975: Tharwat Sayed (EGY)
- 1979: Mohamed Naguib Hamed (EGY)

=== Javelin throw ===
- 1975: François Bogui (CIV)
- 1979: ?. Onderi (KEN)

=== 4 × 100 metres relay ===
- 1975: Ivory Coast (CIV)
- 1979: Ghana (GHA)
- 2004: Nigeria (NGR)

=== 4 × 400 metres relay ===
- 1975: Ghana (GHA)
- 1979: Kenya (KEN)

== Women's champions ==
=== 100 metres ===
- 1975: Juliana Mensah (GHA)
- 1979: Hanitra Rabarivola (MAD)

=== 200 metres ===
- 1975: Grace Bakari (GHA)
- 1979: Hanitra Rabarivola (MAD)

=== 400 metres ===
- 1975: Grace Bakari (GHA)
- 1979: Gloria Ayanlaja (NGR)

=== 800 metres ===
- 1975: H. Avong (NGR)
- 1979: Sakina Boutamine (ALG)

=== 100 metres hurdles ===
- 1975: Kemi Sandgodeyi (NGR)
- 1979: Judy Bell-Gam (NGR)

=== High jump ===
- 1975: Juliana Mensah (GHA)
- 1979: Elizabeth Ezo (NGR)

=== Long jump ===
- 1975: Juliana Mensah (GHA)
- 1979: Florence Ochonogor (NGR)

=== Shot put ===
- 1975: Sabah Moawed (EGY)
- 1979: Caroline Achugbu (NGR)

=== Discus throw ===
- 1975: Adobi Okoli (NGR)
- 1979: Caroline Achugbu (NGR)

=== Javelin throw ===
- 1975: Victoria Ogbeh (GHA)
- 1979: Ténin Camara (CIV)

=== 4 × 100 metres relay ===
- 1975: Ghana (GHA)
- 1979: Nigeria (NGR)

=== 4 × 400 metres relay ===
- 1979: Nigeria (NGR)
