= Sport in Africa =

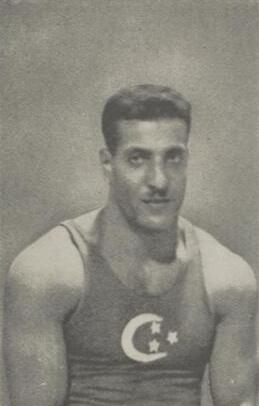
Egyptian weightlifter El-Sayed Nosseir, winner of the gold medal in the light heavyweight class at the 1928 Summer Olympics in Amsterdam. He is the first Egyptian and African to win an Olympic gold medal in the history of the Olympic Games.

Sports in Africa is organized, with many sports having professional leagues. Association football (also known as soccer) is the most popular sport in almost all African countries. Some East African nations, such as Kenya and Ethiopia, are very dominant at long-distance running, whilst North African countries such as Algeria, Egypt, Morocco and Tunisia are dominant in handball. Rugby union and golf are reasonably popular in a few African countries, though rugby union is very popular in South Africa.

Traditional sports were strictly marginalised during the colonial era, and many are dying or have gone extinct under the pressure of modernisation, however lots remain popular despite not having formal governmental recognition or support. In 2010, South Africa became the first African nation to host the FIFA World Cup.

== History ==
Africa has a long history of indigenous sport. European colonialism from the late nineteenth century onwards brought Western sports to the continent while reducing the practice of local sports, which were seen by Europeans as primitive and anti-Christian.

Sport in Africa before the mid-twentieth century was primarily played by Europeans. This was used to further the division between the social classes of both races. General physical education was implemented within the urban areas of African colonies to "civilize" and improve the productivity of African locals. As the offspring of the European elites and indigenous natives pursued education, they became introduced to the sports that had been previously reserved to the European settlers. There, many of them excelled and became "African Sport Stars" and were revered for their excellent performances. Those athletes would be included in the British and French national teams as there was a potential to their athletic prowess. From then on, the colonized African colonies were represented on the international sports scene. The elite athletes in the Anglophone and Francophone African colonies were called the "noble savages." They often were children of Senegalese tirailleurs or military men.

After World War II, and the reconstruction era of European borders, Britain and France found it difficult to keep their colonies, especially with growing nationalism. After the League of Nations was created, Britain and France committed to the principles of good government, which stated the people have a right to determine their own form of government. Preceding the end of World War II, Africa took initiative to become independent of the neocolonial guardianship created by Britain and France. The internationalisation of African sports depended heavily on the decolonisation movements, alongside the integration into the Olympics. The African continent utilized sports as a way to fight against apartheid in South Africa and end racism by social status. As the "noble savages" gained popularity, African elites seized this opportunity to not only fight apartheid and develop African sports, but to also carve an image of a new independent Africa.

=== Contemporary era ===
In 1956, football boomed in the African continent with the establishment of the Confederation of African Football. Pan-Africanism was expressed through sports, but was conditioned by Western sporting federations like FIFA. Nevertheless, in the 1960 Rome Olympics, African sportsmen were very successful in their respective fields, even scoring high places at the end of the competition. Sports furthered Africa's quest for independence, and today the African continent is renowned in many sports, especially in football.

== Infrastructure ==
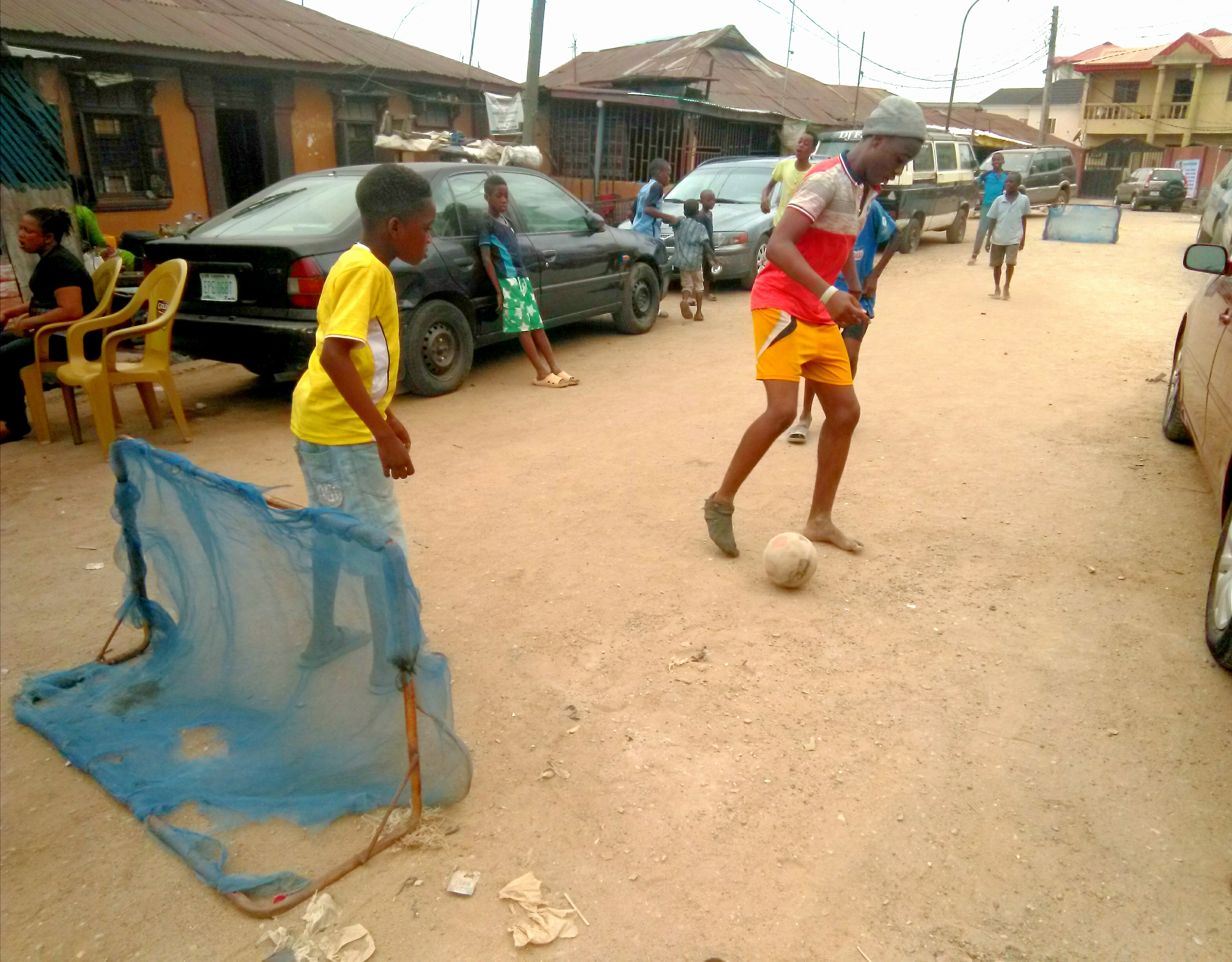
Street football in Lagos, Nigeria

Unlike North Africa, the rest of Africa's relative lack of success in international sports is due to lack of infrastructure.

== Team sports ==
=== Association Football ===
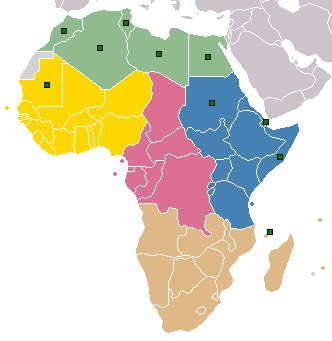
African regional federations

UNAF (North)
WAFU-UFOA (West)
UNIFFAC (Central)
CECAFA (East)
COSAFA (Southern)

Association football (also known as soccer) is the most popular sport in every African country. African club teams compete in the CAF Champions League and CAF Confederation Cup. African national teams compete in the Africa Cup of Nations and also in the African Nations Championship for local teams.

=== Baseball ===
Baseball has very little presence in Africa. However, the World Baseball Softball Confederation started Baseball5, a street variation of baseball, with nine founding countries, (Note: Angola, Botswana, Ghana, Lesotho, Namibia, Nigeria, Sierra Leone, Zambia and Zimbabwe) as a way of introducing the sport to the continent.

=== Basketball ===
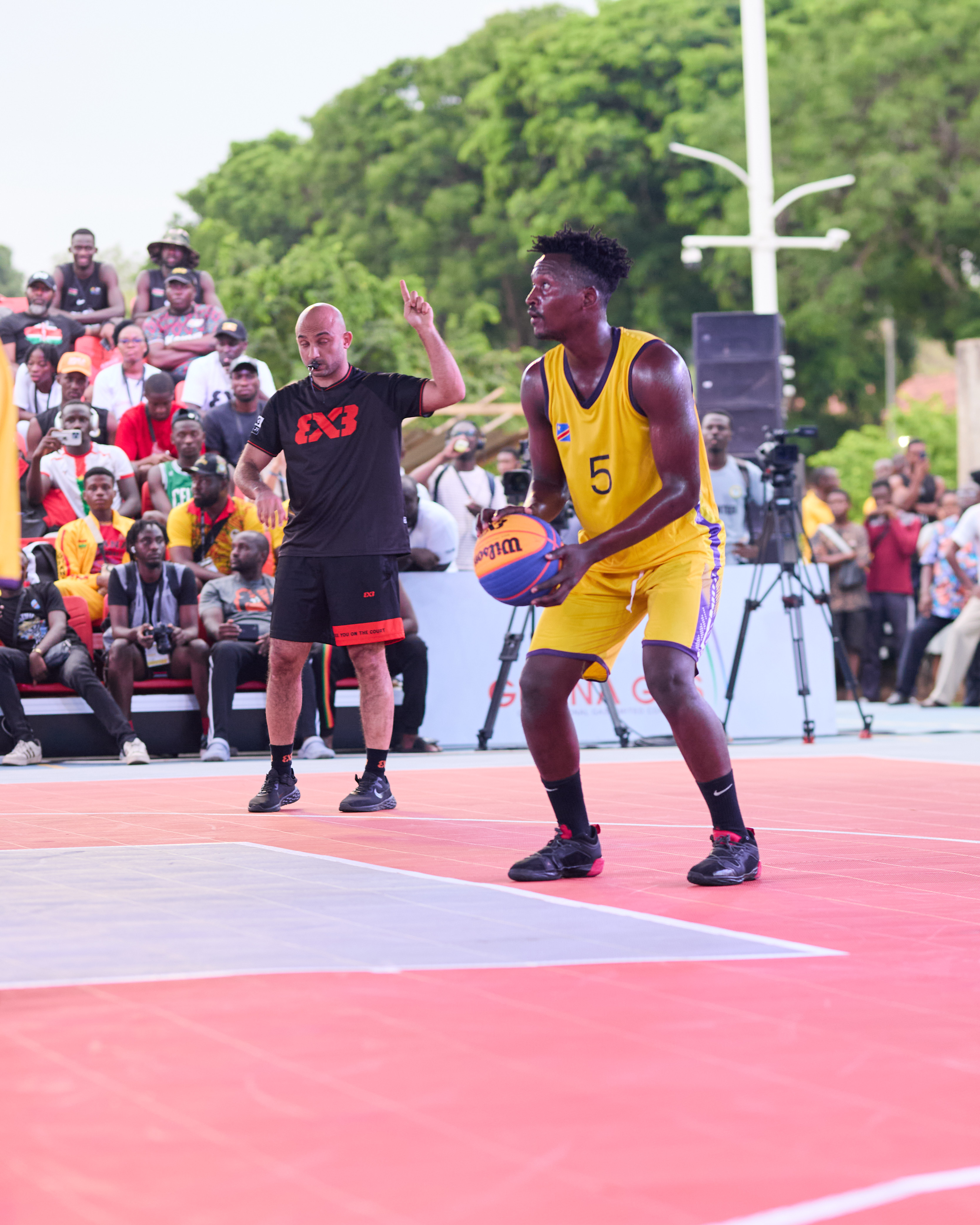
3x3 basketball at the 2023 African Games in Ghana

Basketball is also popular throughout the continent, with notable results in Nigeria, Tunisia, Egypt, Senegal, Ivory Coast, Cameroon and Angola, recently too in Cape Verde and South Sudan.

The Nigerian Hakeem Olajuwon (2x times NBA Champion with Houston Rockets) is one of the best foreign players in the NBA's history and considered fundamental in developing and popularizing Basketball in Africa.

=== Cricket ===
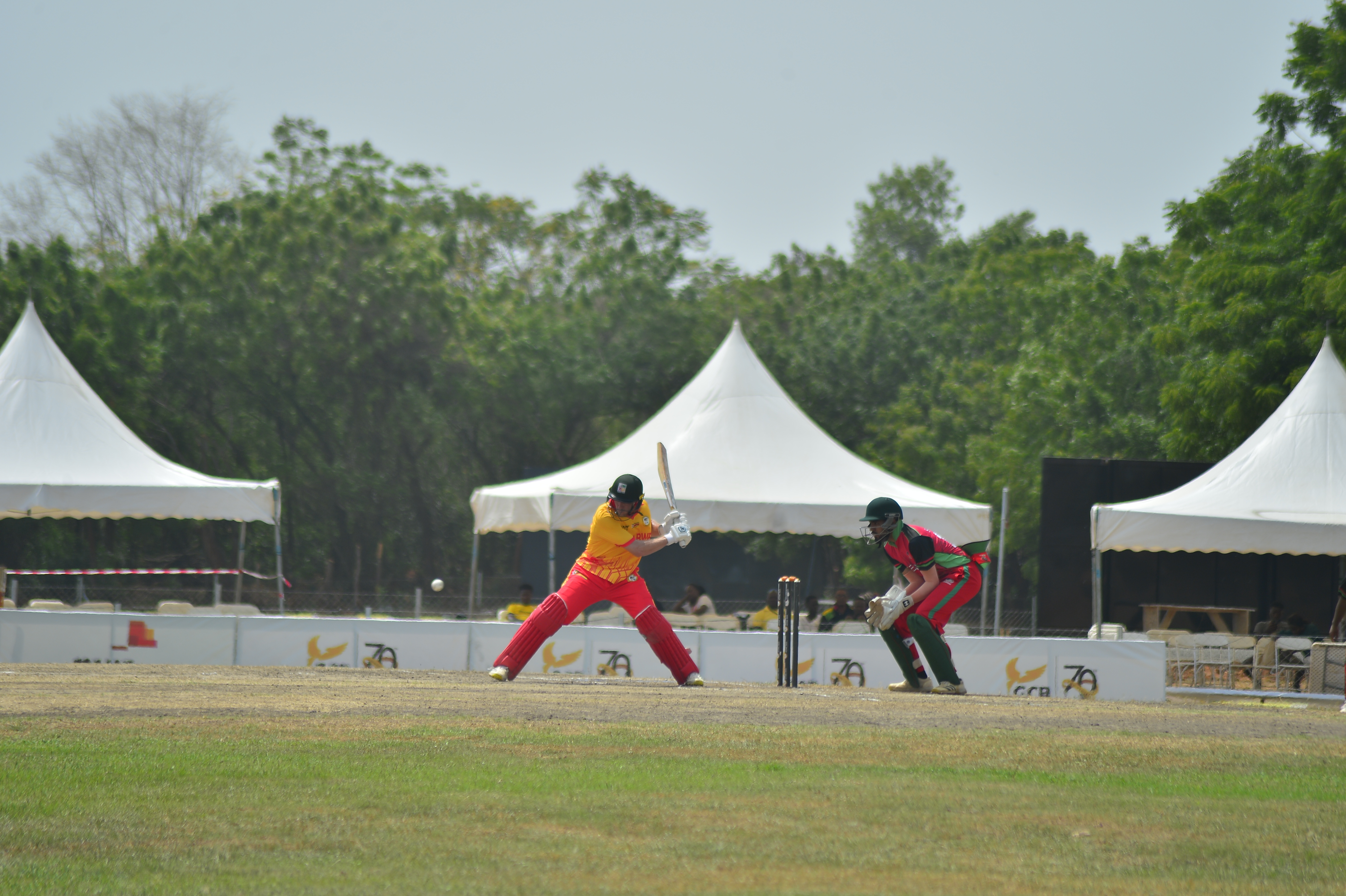
T20 cricket at the 2023 African Games

Cricket is a popular summer sport in the United Kingdom and has been exported to other parts of the former British Empire. Cricket has its origins in south east Britain. It is popular throughout England and Wales, and parts of the Netherlands, and in other world areas, especially in southern Africa, Australia, New Zealand and the Indian subcontinent. It is played to test cricket level in South Africa and Zimbabwe, with notable results in Kenya and Namibia.

=== Field Hockey ===
Field hockey is popular throughout the former regions of the British Empire in Africa, with notable results in Egypt, Nigeria, Ghana, Kenya, Namibia, Botswana, Zimbabwe and especially South Africa.

=== Ice hockey ===
Ice hockey is a minority sport in Africa, in which only a handful of African countries participate.

=== Rugby union ===
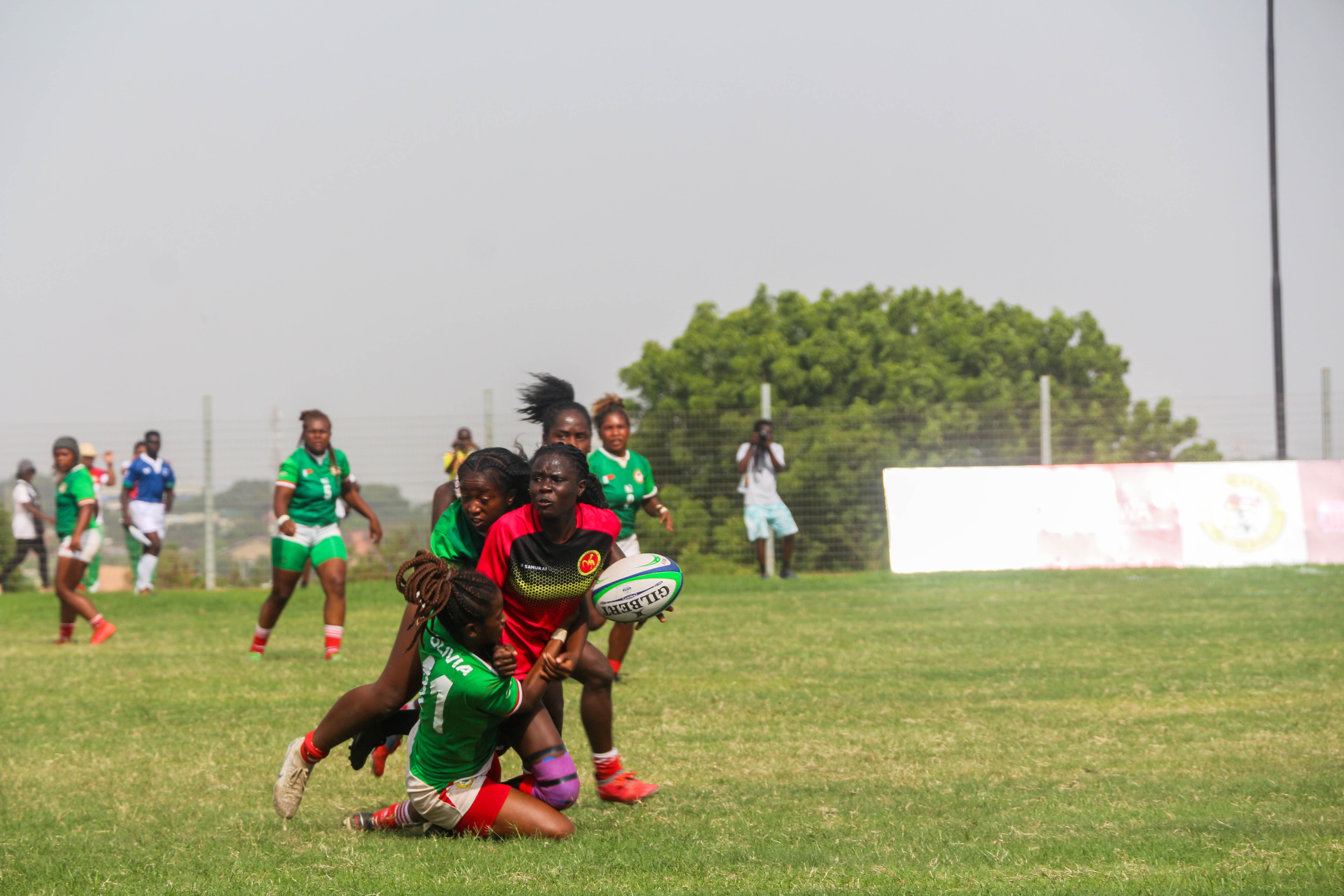
Uganda vs Madagascar

Rugby union is very popular in South Africa (4x times World Champions in 1995, 2007, 2019 & 2023) and other countries have notable results such as Morocco, Namibia, Zimbabwe and Ivory Coast. The major competition in the continent is the Africa Cup that contains the teams in the first level of African rugby, and African Development Trophy contains the teams in the second level. Only the South Africa rugby team compete in the intercontinental tournament, The Rugby Championship. Albert Grundlingh's article discusses the affects that a sport had on nationalism, specifically how rugby union shaped the Afrikaner identity to some extent. The university of Stellenbosch was described as the “mecca” for South African rugby union was a counter to English-speaking universities by illuminating “the root of Afrikandom”.

=== Other sports ===
Handball and volleyball are popular especially in North Africa, Other team sports like water polo, roller hockey and netball are also popular in some Eastern and Southern countries from Africa.

== Individual sports ==
Individual sports are also very important. Africa has a major multisports competition called All-Africa Games that started in 1965 held in Brazzaville, Republic of the Congo.

=== Athletics ===
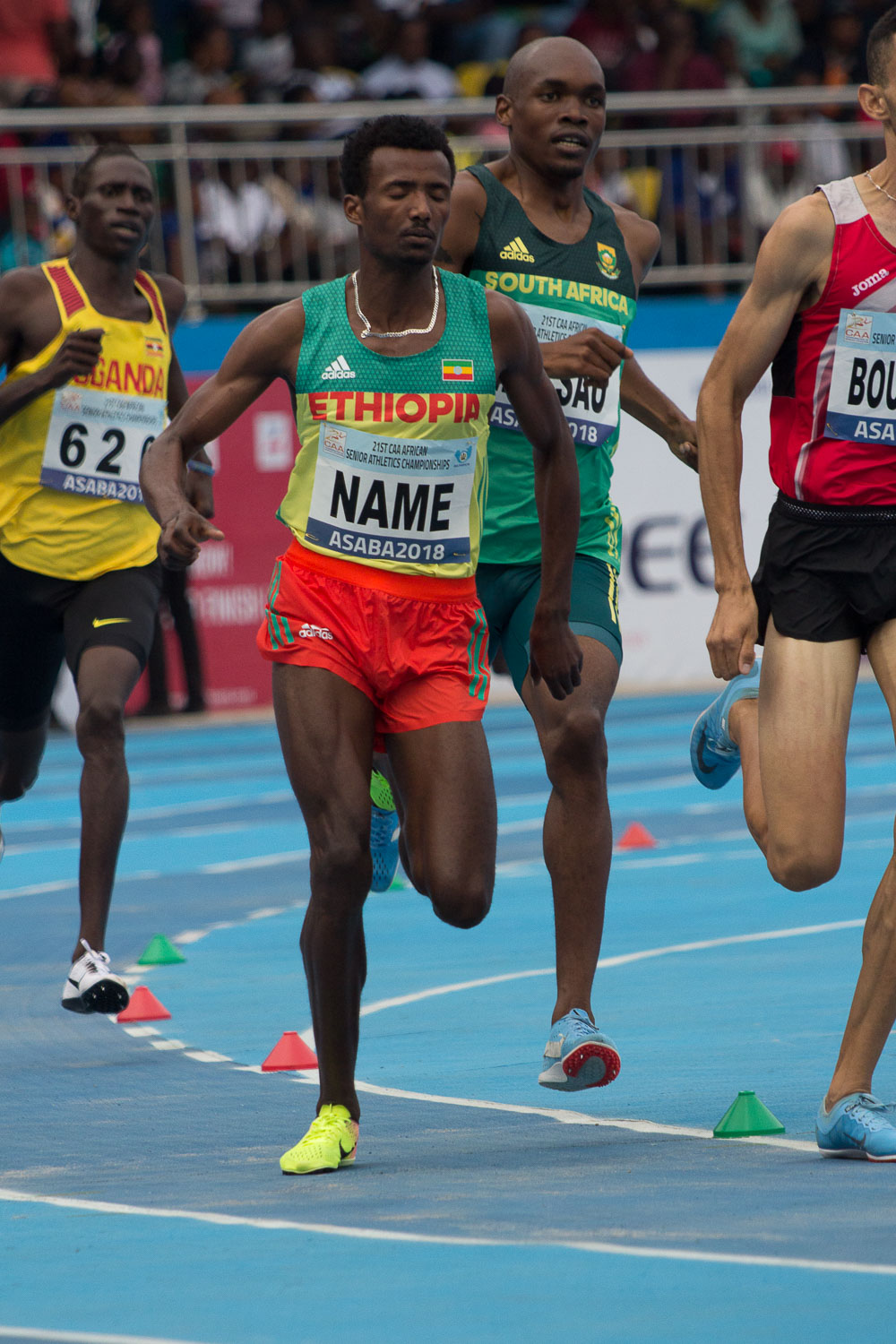
2018 African Athletics Championships in Asaba, Nigeria

Athletics is one of the major single competitions in Africa. The discipline has been part of the African Games since 1965. The African Athletics Championships has been held biannually since 1979. The African Cross Country Championships was first held in 1985 and later since 2011. The African Mountain Running Championships has been held since 2009.

In addition, several editions of the IAAF World Cross Country Championships have been held in Africa. The Meeting International Mohammed VI d'Athlétisme de Rabat has been held at Morocco since 2008 as part of the IAAF World Challenge and the IAAF Diamond League. Previously, the Meeting Grand Prix IAAF de Dakar was part of the IAAF Grand Prix and IAAF World Challenge. The Cape Town Marathon became an IAAF Silver Label event in 2014 and an IAAF Gold Label event in 2017.

Kenya and Ethiopia have been dominant in athletics at the Summer Olympics since the 1960s, especially in mid-distance and long-distance running.

=== Cycling ===
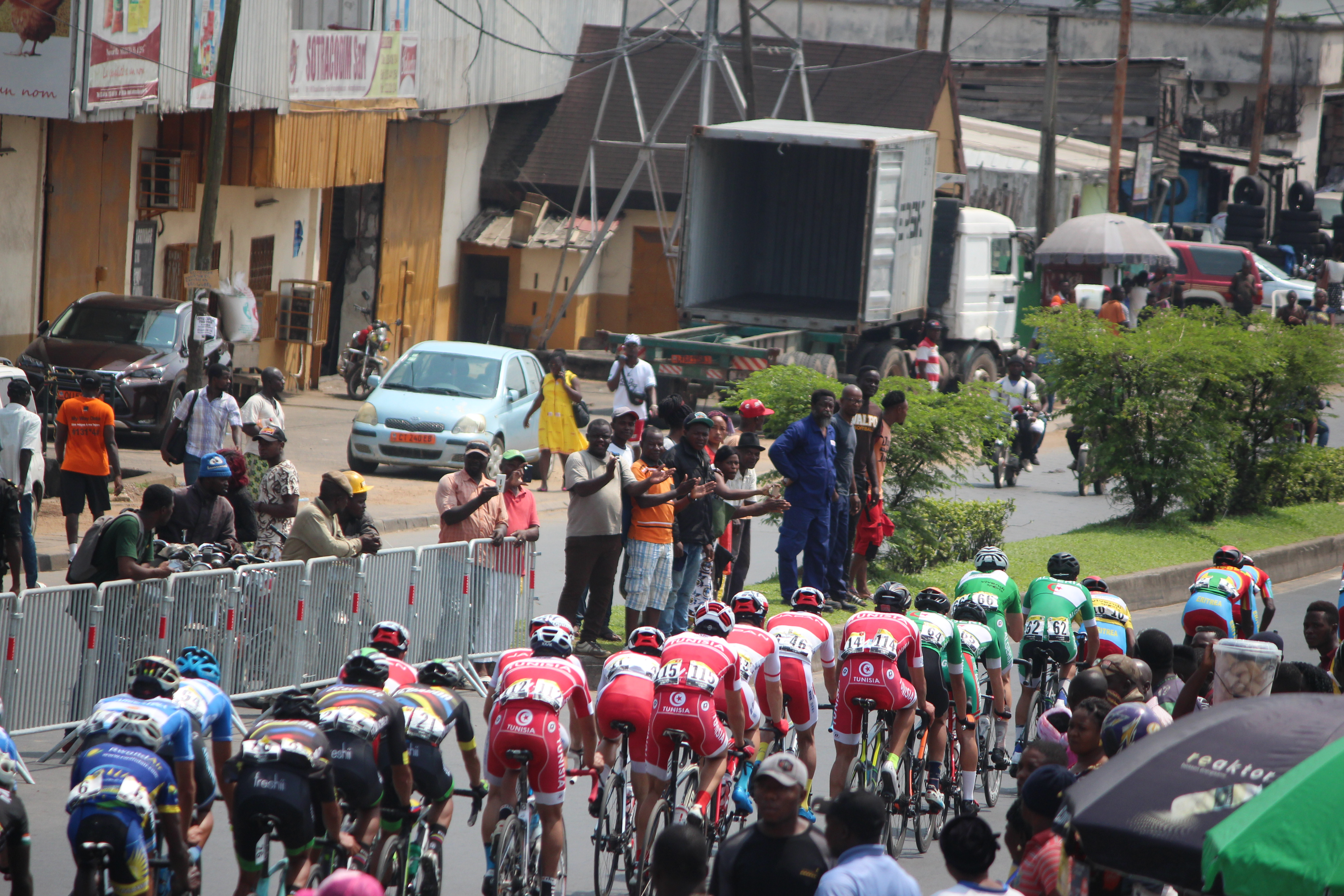
Cycling competition in Douala, Cameroon

The UCI Africa Tour road cycling competition has been held since 2005.

The Dimension Data, formerly MTN–Qhubeka, was the first African team to enter the Grand Tours in 2015. Notable team members include Jacques Janse van Rensburg and Youcef Reguigui.

Kenya and Rwanda are rising forces in world cycling.

=== Golf ===
Golf is a minority sport in Africa. The Sunshine Tour is based in South Africa but also visits other neighbour countries. Several tournaments have been co-sanctioned by the European Tour, such as the South African Open, South African PGA Championship, Alfred Dunhill Championship, Nedbank Golf Challenge, Africa Open, Joburg Open, Tshwane Open,

Notable African golfers include Bobby Locke, winner of The British Open four times in 1949, 1950, 1952 and 1957; Gary Player, winner of the British Open in 1959, 1968 and 1974, The Masters in 1961, 1974 and 1978, the PGA Championship in 1962 and 1972 and the U.S Open in 1965; Ernie Els, winner of the 1994, 1997 U.S. Open and 2002 British Open; Nick Price, winner of the 1992 and 1994 PGA Championship and 1994 British Open; Retief Goosen; Trevor Immelman; Louis Oosthuizen and Charl Schwartzel.

=== Motorsport ===
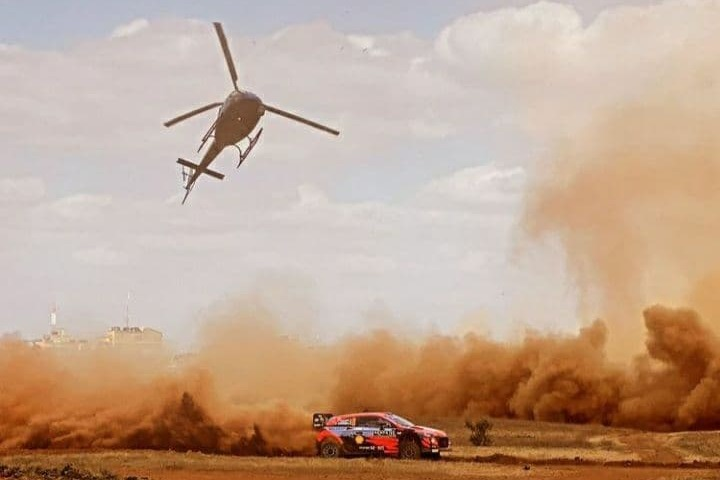
Safari Rally in Kenya

Motorsport is popular in South Africa. The country has hosted several international races, such as the South African Grand Prix (Formula One), South African motorcycle Grand Prix (Grand Prix motorcycle racing), etc. The Moroccan Grand Prix was the first Grand Prix from Africa to host the Formula 1 in 1958.

The Safari Rally was part of the World Rally Championship from 1973 until 2002, before returning in 2021. Previously the Rallye Côte d'Ivoire was also held as a WRC round from World Rally Championship for drivers and manufacturers from 1977 to 1992. The Dakar Rally cross-country race was held across North Africa from 1979 to 2007, including a north–south route in 1992 and a west–east route in 2000.

Jody Scheckter is the only auto driver from Africa to win the Formula 1 in 1979, whereas Tony Maggs and John Love scored podiums. Giniel de Villiers won the Dakar Rally in 2009. In Motos, South Africa had/has notable riders such as Kork Ballington, Jon Ekerold, and currently Brad Binder, while Rhodesian riders include Ray Amm and Jim Redman.

=== Tennis ===
Tennis is a minority sport in Africa.

Notable players include Kevin Anderson, Irene Bowder Peacock, Jaroslav Drobný, Cliff Drysdale, Kevin Curren, Wayne Ferreira, Johan Kriek, Brian Norton, Sandra Reynolds, Eric Sturgess, Ian Vermaak, Amanda Coetzer and Kevin Anderson.

The South African Open was part of the Grand Prix from 1972 to 1989 and the ATP Tour from 1990 to 2011.

=== Water sports ===
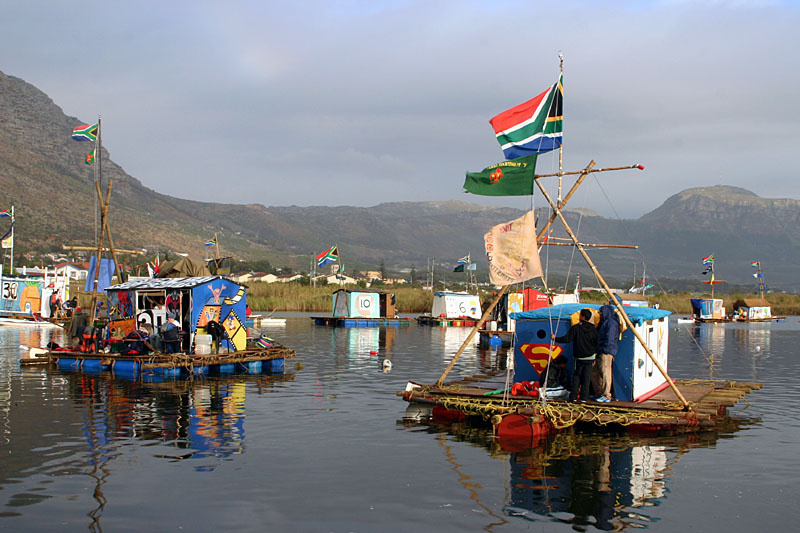
Kon-Tiki (Scouting) in Cape Town, South Africa

Water sports are popular in coastal countries, along the shores of Great Lakes and rivers. Rafting, paddling, kayaking are growing types in Kenya, South Africa, Zambia, Rwanda and Uganda. It can be enjoyed both as a sport and a form of active tourism, designed for groups of different numbers of participants and levels of training.

== Combat sports ==
There are also major martial arts and combat sport competitions in the continent.

=== Boxing ===
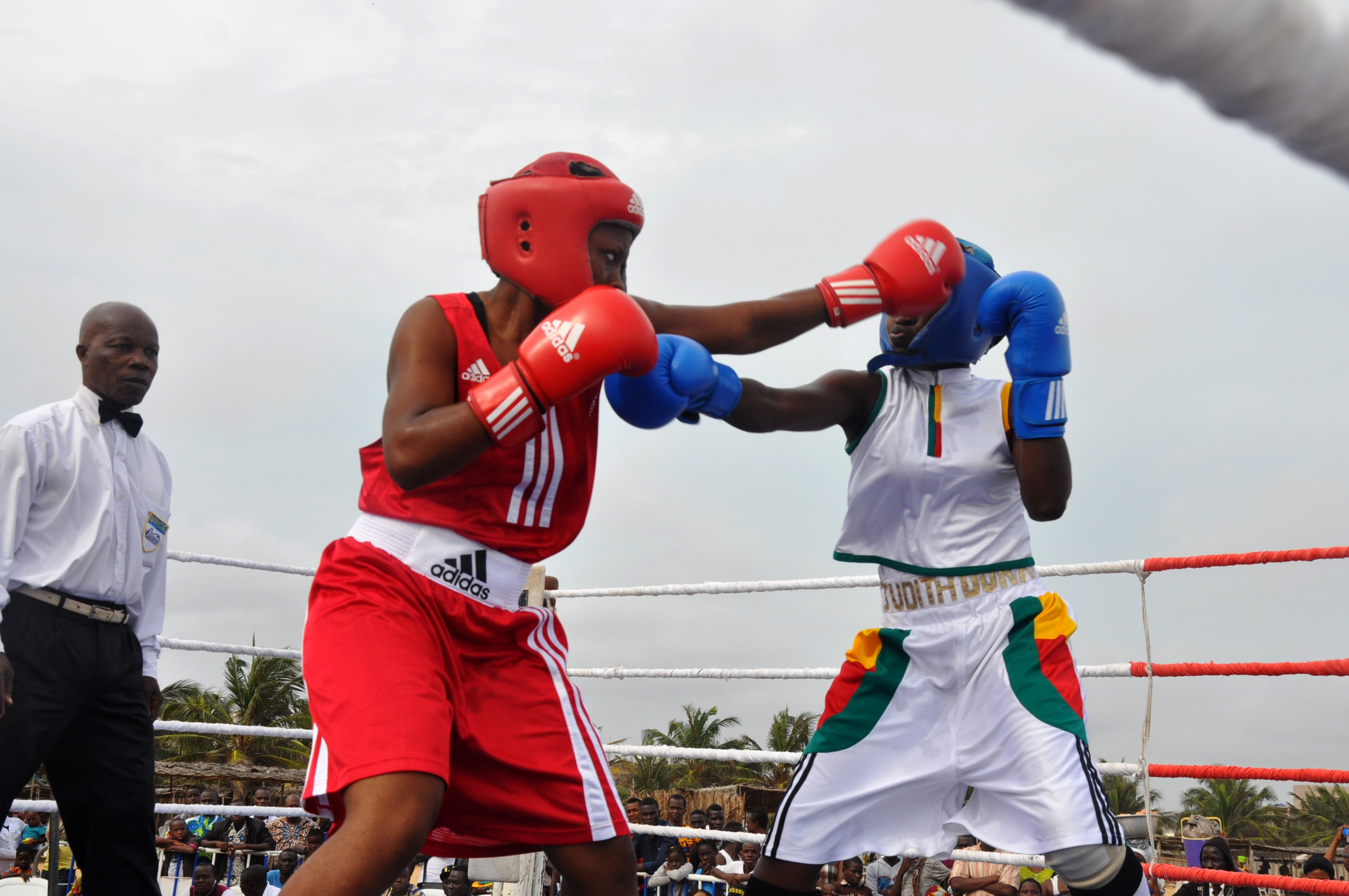
Female boxing

Louis Phal was the first African world boxing champion. It would another 4 decades for another boxing world champion in the form of Richard Ihetu. Meanwhile, there was little administrative framework for professional boxing in Africa until 1973, when representatives of nine African nations created the African Boxing Union. On October 30, 1974, Muhammad Ali and George Foreman fought for a heavyweight title in Zaire which became known as Rumble in the Jungle.

Africa has produced many world champions, with Azumah Nelson the most well known.

=== Judo ===
Africa has yet to produce a winner in world judo. African Judo Championships is the most important judo event in Africa.

=== Karate ===
Karate was first introduced in Africa in the 1960s. The Union of African Karate Federation is in charge of karate in Africa.

=== Mixed martial arts ===
Notable African mixed martial artists include UFC middleweight champion Israel Adesanya, UFC welterweight champion Kamaru Usman, and UFC heavyweight champion Francis Ngannou.

Extreme Fighting Championship (formerly known as EFC Africa) is a South African promotion founded in 2009. It is the number one mixed martial arts organisation in the African continent.

EFC Africa 19, which was held at Carnival City in Johannesburg on 19 April 2013, topped other African sports ratings with a record of over 1.8 million views with 31.3% of the total South African TV audience (SABC, e.tv and DStv combined). These are the biggest ratings in EFC history, topping EFC Africa 12's record of 1.6 million views and 25.9% audience share. EFC 85 has been postponed because of the COVID-19 pandemic.

=== Taekwondo ===
Taekwondo is growing as more people compete in the Olympics. Africa is emerging as a powerhouse in Taekwondo. Taekwondo is run by the African Taekwondo Union.

== Events ==
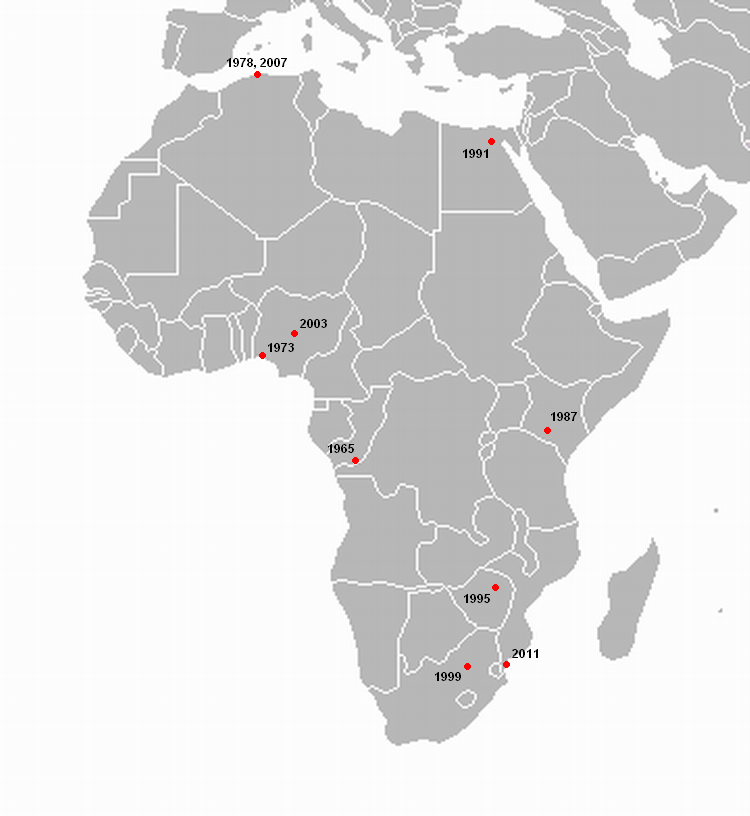
Previous host cities of the African Games

South Africa has hosted the 1995 Rugby World Cup, 2003 Cricket World Cup and 2010 FIFA World Cup. Africa has hosted six editions of the Pan Arab Games and five editions of the Mediterranean Games. Durban, South Africa was announced as host of the 2022 Commonwealth Games in 2015, but they were denied as hosts in 2017.

Notable continental tournaments are the African Games, Africa Cup of Nations, CAF Champions League, African Championships in Athletics, African Rally Championship and Sunshine Tour.

=== All-Africa events ===
- African Games
- African Beach Games
- African Youth Games
- African Para Games
- All-Africa University Games
- African Military Games
- African Championship
- List of African Olympic medalists

=== Regional events ===
- Mediterranean Games
- Mediterranean Beach Games
- Arab Games and Championship
- North African Championship - Maghreb Championship
- East African Championship
- West African Championship
- Central African Championship
- Southern African Championship
- East African Games
- West African Games
- Central African Games
- South African Games
- Indian Ocean Island Games

==== East Africa ====
1st Edition of the East African Community Games (EACoG) (2018).

1. East African Community Games (EACoG)
2. East African Schools Games (FEASSSA Games)
3. CECAFA Cup
4. EAC Military Games and Culture Event
5. EAC Inter-Parliamentary Games
6. East African Secondary Schools Games
7. East African Inter -University Games
8. East Africa University Female Games
9. East African Netball Championship
10. East Africa Rugby Cup (EARC)
11. East African Rugby Super Cup
12. East African Cup
13. East Africa Handball Championship
14. East African Cricket Cup
15. East African Beach Volleyball Championships
16. East African Athletic
17. East Africa Sports for People with Disability

==== Southern Africa ====
1. Southern African Games (CUCSA Games)

=== Winter Olympics ===
Many people of the African diaspora represent African nations at the Winter Olympics.

== See also ==
- Africa Military Games
- African Sports Confederation of Disabled
- African Youth Games
- Association of African Sports Confederations
- Association of National Olympic Committees of Africa
- Confederation of University and College Sports Associations
- List of African Olympic medalists
- Sport in Asia
- Sport in Europe
- Sport in Oceania
- Sport in South America
- Sports in North America

== Bibliography ==
- Bogopa, D. (2001). ”Sports Development: Obstacles and solutions in South Africa”. In The African Anthropologist, vol. 8, No. 1.
- Chiweshe, M. K. (2014). “The problem with African Football:Corruption, and the (under)development of the game on the continent”. In African Sports Law and Business Bulletin/2014.
- Keim, M. and de Coning, C. (ed.) (2014).Sports and Development Policy in Africa: Results of a Collaborate Study of Selected Country Cases. Cape Town: Interdisciplinary Centre of Excellence for Sports Science and Development (ICESSD), University of Western Cape.
- Mwisukha, A. and Mabagala, S. (2011). “Governance challenges in sports in East Africa”. Unpublished paper presented at the international conference of the African Sports Management Association held on 2–4 December 2011, Kampala, Uganda. Available from http://ir-library.ku.ac.ke/handle/123456789/13541.
- Pannenborg, A. (2010): “Football in Africa: Observations about political, financial, cultural and religious influences”, NCDO Publication Series Sports& Development.
- Steiner, A (2008) “Challenges of sports development in Ghana”, 27 October 2008. Available from https://www.modernghana.com/news/188252/challenges-of-sports-development-in-ghana.html.
