= Federation of Eastern Africa University Sports =

Regional university sports governing body in Eastern Africa

- Abbreviation: FEAUS
- Type: University sports organization
- Headquarters: East Africa
- Region served: Eastern Africa
- Parent organization: Federation of Africa University Sports (FASU)
- Website: feaus.net

The Federation of Eastern Africa University Sports (FEAUS) is a regional university sports governing organization in Eastern Africa and one of the zonal associations of the Federation of Africa University Sports (FASU). It is responsible for coordinating inter-university sporting activities, competitions, and development programmes among member institutions and national university sports associations in the Eastern African region.

FEAUS organizes regional university games and championships and promotes student participation in sport as a means of fostering regional integration, leadership, and educational development.

== History ==
The origins of organized university sports cooperation in Eastern Africa started in 1958 during the period of the former University of East Africa, which comprised constituent colleges in Uganda, Kenya, and Tanzania. The federation traces its historical roots to this era of regional academic collaboration.

FEAUS subsequently developed as the Eastern African zonal body within the continental structure of FASU, which was established in 1971 to coordinate university sport across Africa.

== Organization ==
FEAUS operates as one of the regional zones of the Federation of Africa University Sports. The federation works with universities, national university sports associations, and higher education institutions throughout Eastern Africa to organize competitions and sports development initiatives.

As of 2024, the federation's leadership included:

- President: Dr. Simon Munayi (Kenya)
- Secretary General: Brian Nsubuga Miiro (Uganda)
- Treasurer: Patrick Mwani (Tanzania)

== Membership ==
According to FASU, the Federation of Eastern Africa University Sports serves member associations and institutions from the following countries:

- Burundi
- Eritrea
- Ethiopia
- Kenya
- Somalia
- Tanzania
- Uganda

== Competitions ==
FEAUS organizes regional university sports competitions involving higher education institutions from across East Africa. Sports competitions include both indoor and outdoor games such as football, rugby, volleyball, netball, athletics, chess, badminton, and other disciplines.

=== Eastern Africa University Games ===
The Eastern Africa University Games are the federation's principal multi-sport event, bringing together student-athletes from universities across the region. The competitions are held periodically and rotate among host institutions.

=== Women's Games ===
In 2022, FEAUS organized the Eastern Africa University Women's Games at Busitema University in Uganda. The event focused on promoting women's participation in university sport and included competitions in multiple disciplines as well as discussions on gender equality in sports development.

== See also ==
- Federation of Africa University Sports
- International University Sports Federation
- University sport
- West African University Games (WAUG)
- Ghana Universities Sports Association (GUSA)
