= All-Africa University Games =

African regional multi-sport event

- Purpose: Multi-sport event for universities in Africa.
- Frequency: Every four years
- Inaugurated: 1975 Accra
- Most recent: 2026 Cairo
- Organization: FASU

The All-Africa University Games is a regional multi-sport event representing Africa, organized for university athletes by the Federation of Africa University Sports (FASU). The games were first held in 1975 in Accra, Ghana.

== History ==
The FASU All-Africa University Games were first held around the 1974-75 new year period in Accra, Ghana and again at the same time of year in 1978–79 in Nairobi, Kenya. The event was after scheduled to be held in Lusaka, Zambia in 1982, however was cancelled and not re-introduced until 2004 in Nigeria when only a very limited range of men's events were contested.

It was set for a tenth edition in 2020, but this was postponed due to the COVID-19 pandemic.

== Editions ==
FASU Games:

Games	Year	Host country	Host city	Dates	Nations	Competitors			Sports	Top nation
Games	Year	Host country	Host city	Dates	Nations	Men	Women	Total	Sports	Top nation
1	1975	Ghana	Accra	27 December 1974 – 1 January 1975	13				8	Liberia
2	1979	Kenya	Nairobi	29 December 1978 – 8 January 1979	14				10	Angola
3	2004	Nigeria	Bauchi	14–22 April	15				7	
4	2006	South Africa	Tshwane	1–8 July	16			1000	14	South Africa
5	2008	Uganda	Kampala	6–16 July	14			803	17	South Africa
6	2012	Namibia	Windhoek	15–22 December	18			750	12	Egypt
7	2014	Kenya	Nairobi	11–18 July						
8	2016	South Africa	Johannesburg	26 June – 2 July	35	328	146	476	10	South Africa
9	2018	Ethiopia	Mekelle	1–8 July						
10	2022	Kenya	Nairobi	6–10 June	14			1450	12	
11	2024	Nigeria	Lagos	20–29 September					13	
12	2026	Egypt	Cairo	8–16 September						

2020, the event was postponed due to the COVID-19 pandemic.

== Results ==
=== 2024 ===
American University, Cairo, Egypt claimed the top spot with:

   Gold: 46
   Silver: 28
   Bronze: 8
   Total: 82
   Rank: 1st

Lagos State University followed as first runner-up:

   Gold: 28
   Silver: 30
   Bronze: 26
   Total: 84
   Rank: 2nd

University of Lagos took second runner-up:

   Gold: 25
   Silver: 33
   Bronze: 40
   Total: 98
   Rank: 3rd

== Sports ==
1. Athletics
2. Badminton
3. Basketball
4. Chess
5. Football
6. Table Tennis
7. Volleyball
8. Handball
9. Swimming
10. Taekwondo
11. Karate

== See also ==
- FISU World University Games (Universiade)
