= Charlton Ehizuelen =

Nigerian former track and field athlete (born 1953)

Medal record

Men's athletics

Representing Nigeria

All-Africa Games
Gold medal – first place	1978 Algiers	Long jump
Gold medal – first place	1978 Algiers	Triple jump

Charlton Ehizuelen (born 30 November 1953) is a Nigerian former track and field athlete who competed in the long jump and triple jump. He set personal bests of 8.26 m (27 ft 1 in) and 16.82 m (55 ft 2 in) for the events, respectively. The latter mark from 1975 remains the Nigerian indoor record.

As an international competitor, he became the first person to win both long jump and triple jump titles at the All-Africa Games, doing so at the 1978 Games in Algiers. He was also a double winner at the one-off West African Games held in 1977. At the inaugural 1977 IAAF World Cup he was a long jump bronze medallist and triple jump fourth-placer. He was one of only three members of the African team to reach the podium that year, alongside Ethiopians Miruts Yifter and Eshetu Tura. He represented Africa again at the 1981 IAAF World Cup, but was eighth in the long jump on that occasion. His international career on the highest stage was stymied by Nigeria's boycotts of the 1976 Montreal Olympics where he was a favorite for a medal and the 1978 Commonwealth Games, done in response to South African apartheid.

Ehizuelen attended University of Illinois and won the NCAA Division I Championship titles in the men's long jump (1975) and the men's triple jump (1974). He was the first African to win either title. He also twice won the long jump at the NCAA Men's Division I Indoor Track and Field Championships (1976, 1977). His success in the American collegiate system came at a time of growing foreign participation in college track, with eight non-Americans winning titles at the 1975 NCAA Championships. He also competed collegiately in his native continent, winning a long jump/triple jump double at the 1975 All-Africa University Games and defending his long jump title four years later. He remained based in the United States during his career and was the long jump winner at the USA Indoor Track and Field Championships.

Ehizuelen remains resident in the United States, is a member of USA Track and Field and has advocated greater support of the Nigerian diaspora to bolster the nation's sporting success.

== International competitions ==
Year	Competition	Venue	Position	Event	Notes
1975	All-Africa University Games	Accra, Ghana	1st	Long jump	7.94 m
1975	All-Africa University Games	Accra, Ghana	1st	Triple jump	15.80 m
1977	IAAF World Cup	Düsseldorf, West Germany	3rd	Long jump	7.89
1977	IAAF World Cup	Düsseldorf, West Germany	4th	Triple jump	16.31
1977	West African Games	Lagos, Nigeria	1st	Long jump	7.92 m
1977	West African Games	Lagos, Nigeria	1st	Triple jump	16.55 m
1978	All-Africa Games	Algiers, Algeria	1st	Long jump	7.92 m
1978	All-Africa Games	Algiers, Algeria	1st	Triple jump	16.51 m
1979	All-Africa University Games	Nairobi, Kenya	1st	Long jump	7.60 m
1981	IAAF World Cup	Rome, Italy	8th	Long jump	7.47 m

== National titles ==
- USA Indoor Track and Field Championships
  - Long jump: 1978
- NCAA Division I Outdoor Track and Field Championships
  - Long jump: 1975
  - Triple jump: 1974
- NCAA Division I Indoor Track and Field Championships
  - Long jump: 1976, 1977

== Seasonal bests ==
- Long jump
  - 1975: 8.26 m (27 ft 1 in)
  - 1976: 7.85 m (25 ft 9 in)
  - 1977: 8.18 m (26 ft 10 in)
  - 1978: 8.11 m (26 ft 7 1/4 in)
  - 1979: 8.04 m (26 ft 4 1/2 in)
  - 1980: 8.14 m (26 ft 8 1/4 in)
  - 1981: 7.77 m (25 ft 5 3/4 in)

== See also ==
- List of African Games medalists in athletics (men)
