= 2008 All-Africa University Games =

The 5th All-Africa University Games were held from 6 to 16 July 2008 in Kampala, Uganda. They were the fifth edition of the All-Africa University Games, organized by the Federation of Africa University Sports (FASU).

Uganda hosted the Games with the ambition of organizing the best All-Africa University Games ever held. The organizing committee aimed in particular to promote African sport, talent, excellence and fair play.

The Games brought together university delegations from 14 countries, competing in 17 sports. Woodball was also included in the programme as an optional sport.

South Africa finished at the top of the overall medal table with 20 gold medals, ahead of Uganda and Algeria.

The organization mobilized 803 delegation members, 1,167 volunteers and 500 security personnel. It also included nine members of the International Woodball Federation, 15 foreign ministers, rectors and mayors, six members of the executive committee of the International University Sports Federation (FISU), and three members of the RADO.

== Participating nations ==
Country
South Africa
Uganda
Algeria
Egypt
Botswana
Senegal
Rwanda
Mozambique
Ghana
Namibia
Kenya
Burkina Faso
Tanzania
Zambia

== Sports ==
- Athletics
- Basketball
- Boxing
- Football
- Handball
- Judo
- Karate
- Netball
- Swimming
- Table tennis
- Taekwondo
- Tennis
- Volleyball
- Weightlifting

== Medal table ==
Final medal tally
Country	Gold	Silver	Bronze	Total
South Africa	20	12	9	41
Uganda	15	19	25	59
Algeria	11	11	7	29
Egypt	9	3	3	15
Botswana	4	2	4	10
Senegal	3	1	2	6
Rwanda	1	2	6	9
Mozambique	1	0	0	1
Ghana	0	4	8	12
Namibia	0	1	4	5
Kenya	0	1	2	3
Burkina Faso	0	0	2	2
Tanzania	0	0	0	0
Zambia	0	0	0	0
