= 2006 All-Africa University Games =

IV All-Africa University Games
- Host city: Tshwane, South Africa
- Nations: 16
- Athletes: 1,000+
- Events: 14 sports
- Opening: 1 July 2006
- Closing: 8 July 2006

The 4th All-Africa University Games were held from 1 to 8 July 2006 in Tshwane, South Africa. They were the fourth edition of the All-Africa University Games, organized by the Federation of Africa University Sports (FASU).

The edition brought together 16 countries competing in 14 sports for the title of Africa's leading university sporting nation. South Africa retained its title, finishing ahead of Algeria and Uganda.

More than 1,000 participants took part in the Games across different categories. The event also welcomed several foreign dignitaries, including representatives from countries as far away as China.

== Host city ==
The fourth edition of the FASU Games was held in the City of Tshwane, South Africa.

The slogan of the Games was "Developing Sport in Africa".

== Participating nations ==
A total of 16 nations participated in the Games. The following 15 countries are listed in the available medal tally:

- Algeria
- Angola
- Botswana
- Cameroon
- Ghana
- Lesotho
- Malawi
- Mozambique
- Namibia
- Senegal
- South Africa
- Eswatini
- Uganda
- Zambia
- Zimbabwe

== Sports ==
- Athletics
- Basketball
- Boxing
- Football
- Handball
- Judo
- Karate
- Netball
- Swimming
- Table tennis
- Taekwondo
- Tennis
- Volleyball
- Weightlifting

== Medal table ==
Rank	Country	Gold	Silver	Bronze	Total
1	South Africa	53	45	30	128
2	Algeria	18	3	3	24
3	Uganda	9	10	12	31
4	Cameroon	4	3	2	9
5	Senegal	3	4	2	9
6	Botswana	2	6	11	19
7	Namibia	2	1	2	5
8	Zimbabwe	1	8	7	16
9	Ghana	1	3	3	7
10	Angola	1	0	0	1
11	Mozambique	1	0	0	1
12	Eswatini	0	1	0	1
13	Zambia	0	0	5	5
14	Malawi	0	0	3	3
15	Lesotho	0	0	0	0
