= 2022 All-Africa University Games =

The 10th All Africa University Games were the 10th edition of the All-Africa University Games, held from 6 June to [...] 2022 in Nairobi, Kenya, on the campus of Kenyatta University. Originally scheduled to take place in 2020, the Games were postponed due to the COVID-19 pandemic.

More than 1,450 student-athletes and 260 officials representing 48 universities from 14 African countries were expected to participate in the event. Participants aged between 17 and 25 competed for their universities rather than their countries.

== Opening ceremony ==
The opening ceremony was held on 6 June 2022. It was attended by Margaret Kenyatta, First Lady of the Republic of Kenya, Leonz Eder, Acting President of the International University Sports Federation (FISU), and Nomsa Mahlangu, President of the Federation of Africa University Sports (FASU).

== Sports ==
Twelve sports were included in the official programme, with men's and women's events: :

- Athletics
- Badminton
- Basketball
- Chess
- Football
- Handball
- Karate
- Swimming
- Table tennis
- Taekwondo
- Tennis
- Volleyball

Five sports are also being organized as demonstrations:

- Woodball ()
- Roll ball ()
- Goalball ()
- Sitting volleyball ()
- Gurasumo () , traditional game of the Borana people in Kenya.

The winners of the men’s and women’s footballball tournaments are set to represent Africa at the 2023 FISU University Football World Cup, held in Jinjiang, China.

== Medal table ==
In addition to medals awarded to athletes and teams, trophies were presented to the universities achieving the highest medal tally in the women's, men's and combined rankings. National federations whose universities achieved the highest medal tally were also awarded trophies.

== Previous and next editions ==
Kenya hosted the All-Africa University Games for the third time, following Nairobi in 1978 and 2014. The 9th edition was held in 2018 in Mekelle, Ethiopia, and was hosted by Mekelle University.

The next edition was scheduled to be held in 2024 in Ivory Coast.

== Medal table by institution ==
Rang	Institution	Pays	Or	Argent	Bronze	Total
1	Université américaine du Caire	Egypt	29	22	18	69
2	Université Ndejje	Uganda	22	11	20	53
3	University of Education, Winneba	Ghana	8	10	5	23
4	Université de Johannesburg	South Africa	8	2	6	16
5	Université Kenyatta	Kenya	7	17	34	58
6	British University in Egypt	Egypt	7	0	0	7
7	Tshwane University of Technology	South Africa	6	4	2	12
8	MISR International University	Egypt	6	1	4	11
9	Université Makerere	Uganda	5	6	4	15
10	Université du Ghana	Ghana	4	7	8	19
11	University for Development Studies	Ghana	3	3	4	10
12	Université française d'Égypte	Egypt	2	6	3	11
13	Université de Maseno	Kenya	2	3	9	14
14	Bindura University of Science Education	Zimbabwe	2	0	0	2
15	United States International University-Africa	Kenya	1	6	3	10
16	Lagos State University	Nigeria	1	4	5	10
17	Université de Maurice	Mauritius	1	1	3	5
18	Université d'Addis-Abeba	Ethiopia	1	1	0	2
19	Mount Kenya University	Kenya	1	0	1	2
20	Université de Kindia	Guinea	1	0	0	1
21	Chinhoyi University of Technology	Zimbabwe	1	0	0	1
22	Strathmore University	Kenya	0	5	6	11
23	Kisii University	Kenya	0	3	2	5
24	Dedan Kimathi University of Technology	Kenya	0	2	0	2
25	National University of Science and Technology	Zimbabwe	0	1	0	1
26	Islamic University in Uganda	Uganda	0	1	0	1
27	Makerere University Business School	Uganda	0	1	0	1
28	Nnamdi Azikiwe University	Nigeria	0	0	1	1
