= Ghana Universities Sports Association =

Governing body that oversees university sports in Ghana

- Abbreviation: GUSA
- Formation: 1964 (formalized 1969)
- Type: Sports governing body
- Purpose: University sports coordination and development
- Region served: Ghana
- Members: 15 universities (public and private)
- President: Shaibu Ibrahim Tanko
- Main organ: General Council
- Website: ghanagusa.com

The Ghana Universities Sports Association (GUSA) is the governing body responsible for overseeing university sports in Ghana. It organizes the biennial GUSA Games and facilitates Ghanaian universities' participation in regional and international multi-sport competitions.

== History ==
GUSA traces its roots to 1964, when the three public Ghanaian universities began holding unofficial multi-sport competitions. A year later, after attending the inaugural West African University Games in Ibadan, Nigeria, Ghanaian delegates, including coach E. T. Kodzi, decided to formalize university sports nationally. A constitution was drafted in 1969, with Sam Blankson (UCC) as president and E. T. Kodzi as secretary.

Initially comprising three public universities, GUSA has since expanded to include up to fifteen institutions, including public and private universities since a constitutional amendment in 2013.

== Structure and governance ==
GUSA is administered by a General Council consisting of representatives from member institutions, including:

- Head of sports management,
- Registrars or proxies,
- Full-time sports coaches,
- Two student sports secretaries (one male, one female)

The Council elects an Executive Committee, which oversees governance, as well as a Technical Committee, a Committee for Female Sports, a Student Committee, and a Patrons’ Committee (comprising university heads)

== Leadership ==
As of 2024–2026, the GUSA Executive Committee is:

- President: Shaibu Ibrahim Tanko (Director of Sports, UDS) – re-elected March 2, 2024, with 97.3% support
- Vice‑President: Prof. Dominic Otoo (UENR) – reelected
- Organizing Secretary: Timothy Mensah (KNUST) – reelected
- Financial Secretary: Ibrahim Ali Abdulai (UPSA) – reelected
- Public Relations Officer: Asante Forkuo (UCC) – elected

== GUSA Games ==
GUSA Games are held biennially, bringing together student-athletes from up to 16 universities to compete in sports including athletics, football, basketball, volleyball, handball, hockey, tennis, goalball, beach volleyball, badminton, and table tennis

- 28th Games: Hosted at UCC from 7–21 January 2025; over 1,000 athletes competed. UCC won with 18 gold medals, followed by UGH and UEW

== Advocacy and funding ==
GUSA has called for increased government support, citing funding limitations that affect infrastructure and program development. President Tanko has noted a lack of sponsorship and stated that the association relies primarily on membership dues from university sports departments.

== International representation ==
GUSA represents Ghanaian universities in regional and international university sports organizations, including:

- West African University Games (WAUG)
- Federation of Africa University Sports (FASU)
- International University Sports Federation (IUSF)

== Member institutions ==
Institutions affiliated with GUSA include:

- University of Ghana (UG)
- Kwame Nkrumah University of Science and Technology (KNUST)
- University of Cape Coast (UCC)
- University for Development Studies (UDS)
- University of Education, Winneba (UEW)
- University of Energy and Natural Resources (UENR)
- University of Mines and Technology (UMaT)
- University of Health and Allied Sciences (UHAS)
- University of Professional Studies, Accra (UPSA) Plus several private universities following the 2013 expansion

== Notable alumni ==
- Mukarama Abdulai (UDS) – led female football team to victory at the 2019 GUSA Mini Games; later awarded scholarships to the U.S
