= South African Games =

Apartheid era Olympics replacement tournament

The South African Games, in some years called the South African Open Games, was a multi-sport event held in South Africa during the apartheid era, in response to the country's exclusion from the Olympic Games. Some foreign athletes participated, sometimes without the endorsement of the national governing body of their sport.

== Editions ==
=== 1964 ===
The 1964 South African Games, the first such event, was staged at Wanderers Stadium, Johannesburg. Foreign competitors were invited. In January, IOC had revoked South Africa's invitation to the 1964 Summer Olympics in Tokyo. The White Games were held from 29 February to 9 March, and the Black games from 24 April to 10 May.

=== 1969 ===
The 1969 South African Open Games were held in Bloemfontein, beginning on 15 March. That month U Thant, the Secretary-General of the United Nations, called on all members to break all sporting links with South Africa. Invitations were extended to white athletes from mostly-white countries. The games were organised by the South African National Olympic Committee (SANOC), which used the Olympic rings in its publicity material, without the approval of the International Olympic Committee (IOC). This violation of the Olympic Charter was added to multiple counts of sporting segregation, for which the IOC expelled the SANOC in 1970.

The South African government claimed there were more than 6 000 competitors, including 126 from abroad, in 36 sports codes. Three national teams withdrew having arrived, after pressure from their home governments. A team from West Germany withdrew after pressures from the supreme council to boycott the 1972 Olympics. A full New Zealand team participated, though the New Zealand governing bodies stated the athletes were present as individuals rather than as representing them. One British athlete competed. The U.S. Amateur Athletic Union (AAU) denied permission to compete to four invitees, as did the U.S. State Department to two employees in South Africa.

Competitors complained about low-quality accommodation, and local businesses lost money due to the turnout of fewer spectators than expected.

A separate Black Games was held in Soweto in 1970, but a broad boycott made it even less successful.

=== 1973 ===
The 1973 South African Open International Games were held in Pretoria from 23 March to 7 April. They were sponsored by Shell Oil, and billed as being multi-racial. The South African government in 1970 expected "more than 500 overseas competitors from about 30 countries", and after the Games claimed there were 31 sports, with 1652 local competitors "of all population groups" and 673 foreign competitors and officials from 35 countries.

West Germany, Japan, Great Britain, Belgium and the Netherlands were among those invited. African countries threatened to boycott the 1974 Commonwealth Games in New Zealand if white Commonwealth athletes took part. Fourteen Canadians competed unofficially against government advice. The New Zealand women's national field hockey team competed.

From the United States, the State Department instructed the US embassy in Pretoria to make clear that any US participants were unofficial and that their expenses were being paid by the South African organisers. The American Lawn Bowls Association nominated a pair in autumn 1972, with all their expenses paid by the South African Bowling Association. AAU athletes competed in aquatics (swimming and diving) but the AAU prevented track and field athletes competing. Six members of the 1972 U.S. Olympic shooting team were invited, while five Oregon State University wrestlers were suspended by the AAU after competing. A University of West Florida basketball team comprising "7 whites, 3 blacks" was due to compete.

The FIFA had suspended the Football Association of South Africa (FASA) in 1964, but the FIFA executive gave special permission for foreign amateur teams to enter the soccer tournament in Johannesburg, when the organisers promised that black spectators would be allowed. This permission was withdrawn when it emerged that mixed-race teams would not be permitted. FIFA President Stanley Rous was sympathetic to the FASA but needed the votes of Confederation of African Football delegates to retain his position. The organisers instead staged a four-team soccer tournament for the four recognised South African races; the Whites scored a 4–0 upset over the Blacks in the final, while the Coloureds beat the Indians in the third-place playoff by the same score.

A rowing course was constructed for the Games at Roodeplaat. The sailing events were in Durban.

A report in The Age later in 1973 described "the very successful staging of the South African Games, in which blacks competed with much success."

=== 1981 ===
The 1981 South African Festival Games were held to mark the 20th anniversary of the 1961 Republic. 5500 competitors participated, none from abroad. There were 38 sports at venues in Pretoria, Johannesburg, Cape Town and Durban.

=== 1986 ===
The 1986 South African Games were in Johannesburg, to mark the city's centennial. They began on 4 April and lasted two weeks. Associated Press reported 200 foreign competitors from 14 countries, while the Los Angeles Times reported a total of "an estimated 6,000 athletes from 17 countries". Sports included athletics, swimming, water skiing and lawn bowls. The South African Soccer Federation, and its multi-racial boxing federation, boycotted the event. A team from the US Gymnastics Federation (USGF) was present, which included African American Corrinne Wright. The President of the USGF said its executive director had committed to send a team without informing the board.

== See also ==
- African Games
- Central African Games (inactive)
- West African Games (inactive)

== Citations ==
- Espy, Richard (1981). The Politics of the Olympic Games: With an Epilogue, 1976-1980. University of California Press. ISBN 9780520043954.
- Booth, Douglas (6 December 2012). The Race Game: Sport and Politics in South Africa. Routledge. ISBN 9781136313547.
