= 2014 All-Africa University Games =

VII All-Africa University Games
- Host city: Nairobi, Kenya
- Nations: 16
- Events: 17 sports
- Opening: 11 July 2014
- Closing: 18 July 2014
- Main venue: University of Nairobi

The 7th All-Africa University Games (or 7th FASU Games) were held from 11 to 18 July 2014 in Nairobi, Kenya, primarily at the University of Nairobi. They were the seventh edition of the All-Africa University Games, organized by the Federation of African University Sports (FASU).

The edition brought together 16 African countries competing in 17 sports, including exhibition and demonstration sports. Egypt dominated the Games, finishing at the top of the medal table, followed by Ghana and host nation Kenya.

== Host city ==
The University of Nairobi, located in Nairobi, hosted the seventh edition of the FASU Games.

The official slogan of the Games was "Peace and Solidarity in Africa through Varsity Sports".

== Participating nations ==
A total of 16 nations participated in the Games:

- Angola
- Botswana
- Burkina Faso
- Cameroon
- Democratic Republic of the Congo
- Egypt
- Ethiopia
- Ghana
- Kenya
- Mozambique
- Nigeria
- Rwanda
- Senegal
- Sierra Leone
- South Africa
- Uganda
- Zimbabwe

== Sports ==
The programme comprised 17 sports:

- American football
- Athletics
- Badminton
- Basketball
- Chess
- Football
- Handball
- Karate
- Netball
- Rugby sevens
- Sitting volleyball
- Swimming
- Table tennis
- Taekwondo
- Tennis
- Volleyball
- Woodball

== Medal table ==
Rank	Country	Gold	Silver	Bronze	Total
1	Egypt	66	38	8	112
2	Ghana	11	4	4	19
3	Kenya	8	33	27	68
4	South Africa	6	1	0	7
5	Uganda	4	9	35	48
6	Cameroon	1	3	1	5
7	Mozambique	1	1	0	2
8	Senegal	0	4	2	6
9	Zimbabwe	0	1	4	5
10	Ethiopia	0	0	0	0
