= 2004 All-Africa University Games =

III All-Africa University Games
- Host city: Bauchi
- Country: Nigeria

The 3rd All-Africa University Games were held in Bauchi, Nigeria, in 2004. Nigeria emerged as the overall winner.

The Games also marked the rebirth of the Federation of Africa University Sports (FASU), following an amendment to its constitution at the General Assembly.

== Medal table ==
Rang	Country	Gold	Silver	Bronze	Total
1	Nigeria				
2					
3					
4					
5					
6					
7					
8					
9					
10					
11					
12					
13					
14					
