= 1975 All-Africa University Games =

I All-Africa University Games
- Host city: Accra
- Country: Ghana
- Nations: 13
- Events: 8 sports
- Opening: 27 December 1974
- Closing: January 1975

The 1st All-Africa University Games were held in Accra, Ghana, in December 1974 and January 1975. They were the first edition of the Games organized by the Federation of Africa University Sports (FASU).

The inaugural FASU Games were held in Accra with 13 participating countries: host nation Ghana, Nigeria, Algeria, Egypt, Sudan, Uganda, Gabon, Liberia, Congo, Tanzania, Togo, Zaire (now the Democratic Republic of the Congo) and Zambia.

Eight sports were contested: athletics, tennis, table tennis, swimming, volleyball, basketball, handball, and football.

Ghana emerged as the overall winner, taking the title in the competition that would become a major continental university sporting event.

== Participating nations ==
Country
Ghana
Nigeria
Algeria
Egypt
Sudan
Uganda
Gabon
Liberia
Republic of the Congo
Tanzania
Togo
Democratic Republic of the Congo
Zambia

== Sports ==
- Athletics
- Basketball
- Football
- Handball
- Swimming
- Table tennis
- Tennis
- Volleyball

== Medal table ==
Rank	Country	Gold	Silver	Bronze	Total
1	Ghana				
2	Liberia				
3	Uganda				
4	Algeria				
5	Egypt				
6	Togo				
7	Sudan				
8	Gabon				
9	Nigeria				
10	Kenya				
11	Zambia				
12	Tanzania				
13	Democratic Republic of the Congo				
