= 2016 All-Africa University Games =

2016 FASU Games
- Host city: Johannesburg and Tshwane, South Africa
- Events: 9 sports
- Opening: 26 June 2016
- Closing: 2 July 2016
- Main venue: University of Johannesburg and Tshwane University of Technology

The 8th FASU Games (also known as the 8th All-Africa University Games) were held from 26 June to 2 July 2016 in South Africa, co-hosted by the University of Johannesburg and the Tshwane University of Technology under the organization of University Sports South Africa (USSA) and the Federation of Africa University Sports (FASU).

== Host city and venues ==
The Games were jointly hosted in two cities in South Africa:

- University of Johannesburg (Johannesburg)
- Tshwane University of Technology (Tshwane)

== Sports ==
The sports program for the 8th edition featured 9 sports:

- Athletics
- Badminton
- Basketball
- Chess
- Football
- Netball
- Table tennis
- Tennis
- Volleyball
