= Confederation of University and College Sports Associations =

African sport governing body

- Formation: 1989
- Headquarters: Johannesburg, South Africa
- President: Mr Mwape Nshimbi
- Website: feaus.net

The Confederation of University and College Sports Associations (CUCSA) was created under the directive of the supreme council of Sports in Africa Zone IV and coordinates sports in member countries.

== History ==
The origin of the body can be traced to Lusaka, Zambia and is made up of the National University and the College Sports Association of the Africa Zone VI.

== Executive committee ==
This is the committee responsible for decision making of the body. The committee is made up of the members elected by the assembly.

== Member universities ==
These are member universities under the body. They include:

- Federação Angolana do Desporto Universitário - Angola
- Botswana Tertiary Student Sports Association - Botswana
- Lesotho University & College Sports Association - Lesotho
- Tertiary Students Sports Association of Malawi - Malawi
- Associacao dos Estudantes Universitarios - Mozambique
- Tertiary Institutes Sports Association of Namibia - Namibia
- University Sport South Africa - South Africa
- Swaziland University & Colleges Sports Association - Swaziland
- Zambia Higher Institutions Sports Association - Zambia
- Zimbabwe Tertiary Institutes Sports Union - Zimbabwe
