= 2012 All-Africa University Games =

The 6th All Africa University Games were held from 16 to 20 December 2012 at the University of Namibia campus in Windhoek, Namibia. The slogan of the Games was United on the Smile of Africa.

Egypt finished first in the overall medal standings with 24 gold medals, ahead of Algeria with 20 gold medals. Namibia and Botswana followed with seven gold medals each.

The Games were originally scheduled to be held in Dakar, Senegal, in September 2012. Senegal had confirmed its intention to host the sixth edition during the National University Games of Senegal, held from 1 to 7 April 2011. However, the University Sports Associations of Senegal (UASSU) later informed the Federation of African University Sports (FASU) that it would not be able to host the Games as scheduled.

The FASU Executive Board subsequently sought an alternative host. The Tertiary Institutes Sports Association of Namibia (TISAN) agreed to host the Games in December 2012, following its successful organization of the 16th edition of the CUCSA Games. Due to the limited preparation time available to the host, the number of sports disciplines was reduced to match the available organizational capacity.

== Participating nations ==
The following 18 countries participated in the 6th All Africa University Games:

- Algeria
- Benin
- Botswana
- Burkina Faso
- Egypt
- Ghana
- Kenya
- Mali
- Mozambique
- Namibia
- Nigeria
- Republic of the Congo
- Senegal
- South Africa
- Togo
- Uganda
- Zambia
- Zimbabwe

== Medal table ==
Final Medal Tally
| Country | Gold | Silver | Bronze | TOTAL |
|---|---|---|---|---|
| Egypt | 24 | 13 | 6 | 43 |
| Algeria | 20 | 23 | 17 | 60 |
| Namibia | 7 | 9 | 14 | 30 |
| Botswana | 7 | 8 | 19 | 34 |
| Ghana | 2 | 5 | 6 | 13 |
| Zimbabwe | 1 | 2 | 3 | 6 |
| Uganda | 1 | 0 | 1 | 2 |
| Mozambique | 1 | 0 | 0 | 1 |
| Republic of the Congo | 0 | 2 | 2 | 4 |
| Zambia | 0 | 0 | 7 | 7 |
| Benin | 0 | 0 | 1 | 1 |
| Burkina Faso | 0 | 0 | 0 | 0 |
| Kenya | 0 | 0 | 0 | 0 |
| Mali | 0 | 0 | 0 | 0 |
| Nigeria | 0 | 0 | 0 | 0 |
| Senegal | 0 | 0 | 0 | 0 |
| South Africa | 0 | 0 | 0 | 0 |
| Togo | 0 | 0 | 0 | 0 |
