= West African Games =

International multi-sport event

The West African Games (French: Jeux d'Afrique de l'Ouest) was an international multi-sport event between the nations of West Africa, which was held in Lagos, Nigeria in 1977. Opened on 27 August by Nigeria's head of state, Olusegun Obasanjo, ten countries took part in the eight-day competition. A total of eleven sports were contested.

The competition was also called the ECOWAS Games on account of all participating nations being from the Economic Community of West African States, founded in Lagos two years earlier. It was organised by the ECOWAS Games Council headed by Dan Isokrari. During the games, a second edition to be held in 1979 in Cotonou, Benin was announced, though this did not come to pass.

Some sources referred to this competition as the second West African Games, in light of a previous event organised in 1960.

== Sports ==
- Athletics
- Basketball
- Football
- Karate
- Volleyball

== Participating nations ==
- Benin
- Burkina Faso
- Cape Verde
- Côte d'Ivoire
- Gambia
- Ghana
- Guinea
- Guinea-Bissau
- Liberia
- Mali
- Niger
- Nigeria
- Senegal
- Sierra Leone
- Togo

== See also ==
- African Friendship Games
- African Games
- Central African Games (inactive)
- South African Games (inactive)
- West African University Games
- West African Athletics Championships
