= 1979 All-Africa University Games =

II All-Africa University Games
- Host city: Nairobi
- Country: Kenya
- Nations: 14
- Events: 10 sports
- Opening: 29 December 1978
- Closing: 8 January 1979

The 2nd All-Africa University Games were held in Nairobi, Kenya, from 29 December 1978 to 8 January 1979. The Games aimed to bring together universities from across Africa in an effort to encourage African unity among educated youth and promote sporting activities throughout the continent.

The second edition had originally been scheduled to take place in Uganda in December 1978, but this was not possible because of unforeseen difficulties, including a lack of the necessary facilities. The Games were subsequently held in Nairobi.

Although 25 countries had agreed to participate, only 14 countries took part: Algeria, Angola, Egypt, Nigeria, Ivory Coast, Zambia, Lesotho, Uganda, Kenya, Ethiopia, Togo, Senegal, Ghana and Madagascar.

The second edition also saw the introduction of hockey and judo to the programme, in addition to the sports contested at the inaugural Games.

== Participating nations ==
Country
Algeria
Angola
Egypt
Nigeria
Ivory Coast
Zambia
Lesotho
Uganda
Kenya
Ethiopia
Togo
Senegal
Ghana
Madagascar

== Sports ==
- Athletics
- Basketball
- Football
- Handball
- Hockey
- Judo
- Swimming
- Table tennis
- Tennis
- Volleyball

== Medal table ==
Rank	Country	Gold	Silver	Bronze	Total
1	Angola				
2	Uganda				
3	Algeria				
4	Egypt				
5	Ivory Coast				
6	Togo				
7	Senegal				
8	Madagascar				
9	Ghana				
10	Nigeria				
11	Kenya				
12	Zambia				
13	Lesotho				
14	Ethiopia				
