= West African University Games =

Intermural athletics events

The West African University Games (French: Jeux Universitaires Ouest Africains), also known as the ECOWAS Students Games, is a multi-sport event between student-athletes from West African universities. The competition was first held in 1965 in Ibadan, Nigeria, and has been held on a roughly once ever four to six years since 1989.

The idea for the competition emerged from a conference of West African universities in 1964 in Ibadan.

The last edition to be held was the 14th at the University of Port Harcourt in Nigeria, lasting from 31 October to 12 November 2018. The 13th edition of the games in 2012 involved 1,443 athletes from 56 West African Universities (6 non-competing) from 5 West African nations. A total of 13 Olympic sports were contested.

== Editions ==
Games	Year	Host country	Host city	Dates	Sports	Nations	Competitors	Universities	Medal table winner
1	1965	Nigeria	Ibadan						
2	1967	Ghana	Legon (Accra)						
3	1969	Sierra Leone	Freetown						
4	1971	Nigeria	Lagos						
5	1973	Ghana	Kumasi						
6	1975	Nigeria	Ifẹ						
7	1977	Ivory Coast	Yamoussoukro						
8	1989	Burkina Faso	Ouagadougou						
9	1995	Nigeria	Benin City						
10	1999	Benin	Cotonou						
11	2003	Burkina Faso	Ouagadougou						
12	2008	Ghana	Accra						
13	2012	Nigeria	Ilorin	27 March – 7 April					
14	2018	Nigeria	Port Harcourt	31 October – 12 November					
15	2023	Nigeria	Ife	16 December - 22 December					

== Sports ==
- Athletics ()

== See also ==
- West African Games
- Ghana Universities Sports Association
