= Federation of Africa University Sports =

- Formation: 1971
- Headquarters: Kampala, Uganda
- President: Dr. Ashraf Sobhy
- Website: https://africauniversitysports.com/

The Federation of Africa University Sports (FASU) is the governing body responsible for sporting activities in African universities.

== History ==
The origin of the body can be traced to 1971 when thirty one (31) delegates from seventeen (17) universities in 10 African countries gathered in Lagos with the aim of unifying and improving sporting activities in African universities.

This gathering was a result of the directive given to Lateef Adegbite from Nigeria at the Summer FISU games in Torino, Italy in 1970 by the West African University Games (WAUG) Council to meet all the African delegations and harmonize sporting activities in Africa.

After this meeting, George Benneh from the University of Ghana emerged as the first president of the body while E.T. Kodzi from Ghana emerged as the secretary general.

== Executive Committee ==
This is the committee responsible for decision making of the body. The committee is made up of the members elected by the assembly, presidents of the zones and immediate past president.

This committee meets at least four times every year. Members of the committee includes;

- Dr. Ashraf Sobhy - President
- Tariq Ahshad - 1st Vice President
- Tsitsi Muzuva - 2nd Vice President
- Peninnah Aligawesa Kabenge - Secretary General
- Rono Alfred - Treasurer
- Nomsa Mahlangu- Immediate Past President
- Chidiebere Ezeani - Internal Auditor
- Aupal Emmanuel - Student Representative
- Simon Munayi - President Federation of East Africa University Sports (FEAUS)
- Ibrahim Tanko Shaibu - President West African University Games (WAUG)
- Mwape Nshimbi - President Confederation of Universities and Colleges Sports Association (CUCSA)
- Joseph Nzau wa Nzau - President FASU Central
- Mohamed Sobhi Hassanein - President FASU North

== Activities and events of FASU ==
Activities of FASU is binding on every member nations under the body. Some of these activities includes;

- FASU games every two years (All-Africa University Games)
- FASU championships every two years, Launched in 2013.
- FASU Pre-Games Scientific conference before the FASU Games

== Members ==
47 nations (December 2025).

== Zones (40) ==
FASU has 5 regional associations as North, South, East, West and Central, known as FASU Zone:

1. North African Federation of University Sports (NAFUS) (9): Algeria, Angola, Egypt, Libya, Mauritania, Niger, Sudan, Tunisia, Morocco
2. West Africa University Games(WAUG) (8): Benin, Burkina Faso, Cote d’Ivoire, Ghana, Guinea, Togo, Nigeria, Sierra Leone
3. FASU ZAC (5): Cameroun, Central Africa Rep, Congo, Congo DRC, Equatorial Guinea
4. Confederation of Universities and Colleges Sports Association (CUCSA) (11): Botswana, Lesotho, Madagascar, Malawi, Mauritius, Mozambique, Namibia, South Africa, Swaziland, Zambia, Zimbabwe
5. Federation of East Africa University Sports (FEAUS) (7): Burundi, Eritrea, Ethiopia, Kenya, Somalia, Tanzania, Uganda

== See also ==
- West African University Games (WAUG)
- Federation of Africa University Sports (FASU)
- International University Sports Federation (FISU)
- Ghana Universities Sports Association (GUSA)
